= 1997 Kentucky Wildcats football team =

American college football season

1997 Kentucky Wildcats football
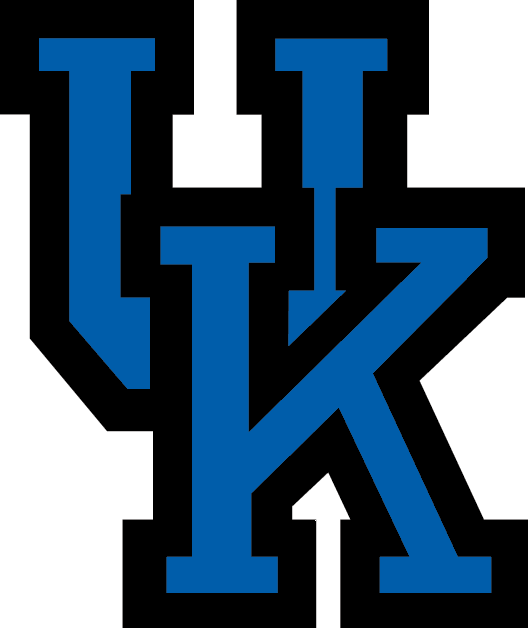
- Conference: Southeastern Conference
- Eastern Division
- Record: 5–6 (2–6 SEC)
- Head coach: Hal Mumme (1st season)
- Offensive coordinator: Mike Leach (1st season)
- Offensive scheme: Air raid
- Defensive coordinator: Mike Major (1st season)
- Base defense: 4–3
- Home stadium: Commonwealth Stadium

1997 Southeastern Conference football standings
| | Conf. | | | Overall |
| Team | W | | L | W | | L |
|---|---|---|---|---|---|---|
Eastern Division
| No. 7 Tennessee x$ | 7 | – | 1 | 11 | – | 2 |
| No. 10 Georgia | 6 | – | 2 | 10 | – | 2 |
| No. 4 Florida | 6 | – | 2 | 10 | – | 2 |
| South Carolina | 3 | – | 5 | 5 | – | 6 |
| Kentucky | 2 | – | 6 | 5 | – | 6 |
| Vanderbilt | 0 | – | 8 | 3 | – | 8 |
Western Division
| No. 11 Auburn xy | 6 | – | 2 | 10 | – | 3 |
| No. 13 LSU x | 6 | – | 2 | 9 | – | 3 |
| No. 22 Ole Miss | 4 | – | 4 | 8 | – | 4 |
| Mississippi State | 4 | – | 4 | 7 | – | 4 |
| Arkansas | 2 | – | 6 | 4 | – | 7 |
| Alabama | 2 | – | 6 | 4 | – | 7 |
Championship: Tennessee 30, Auburn 29
$ – Conference champion; x – Division champion/co-champions; Rankings from AP Poll

The 1997 Kentucky Wildcats football team represented the University of Kentucky as a member of the Eastern Division of the Southeastern Conference (SEC) during the 1997 NCAA Division I-A football season. Led by first-year head coach Hal Mumme, the Wildcats compiled an overall record of 5–6 with a mark of 2–6 in conference place, placing fifth in the SEC's Eastern Division. The team played home games at Commonwealth Stadium in Lexington, Kentucky.

== Schedule ==
| Date | Time | Opponent | Site | TV | Result | Attendance | Source |
|---|---|---|---|---|---|---|---|
| August 30 | 1:30 p.m. | Louisville* | Commonwealth Stadium; Lexington, KY (Governor's Cup) | | W 38–24 | 59,186 | |
| September 6 | 12:30 p.m. | at Mississippi State | Scott Field; Starkville, MS | JPS | L 27–35 | 30,121 | |
| September 20 | 2:00 p.m. | at Indiana* | Memorial Stadium; Bloomington, IN (rivalry) | | W 49–7 | 41,149 | |
| September 27 | 3:30 p.m. | No. 1 Florida | Commonwealth Stadium; Lexington, KY (rivalry) | CBS | L 28–55 | 59,224 | |
| October 4 | 7:00 p.m. | No. 20 Alabama | Commonwealth Stadium; Lexington, KY | PPV | W 40–34 ^{OT} | 59,226 | |
| October 11 | 12:30 p.m. | at South Carolina | Williams–Brice Stadium; Columbia, SC | JPS | L 24–38 | 75,936 | |
| October 18 | 7:00 p.m. | Northeast Louisiana* | Commonwealth Stadium; Lexington, KY | | W 49–14 | 57,500 | |
| October 25 | 3:30 p.m. | at No. 16 Georgia | Sanford Stadium; Athens, GA | CBS | L 13–23 | 85,672 | |
| November 1 | 6:30 p.m. | No. 16 LSU | Commonwealth Stadium; Lexington, KY | ESPN2 | L 28–63 | 58,450 | |
| November 15 | 2:00 p.m. | at Vanderbilt | Vanderbilt Stadium; Nashville, TN (rivalry) | | W 21–10 | 40,256 | |
| November 22 | 12:30 p.m. | No. 5 Tennessee | Commonwealth Stadium; Lexington, KY (rivalry) | ESPN2/JPS | L 31–59 | 61,076 | |
*Non-conference game; Rankings from AP Poll released prior to the game; All times are in Eastern time

== Game summaries ==
=== Louisville ===
| | 1 | 2 | 3 | 4 | Total |
|---|---|---|---|---|---|
| Cardinals | 0 | 3 | 14 | 7 | 24 |
| Wildcats | 21 | 0 | 7 | 10 | 38 |

| Statistics | LOU | UK |
|---|---|---|
| First downs | 25 | 15 |
| Total yards | 519 | 291 |
| Rushing yards | 121 | 87 |
| Passing yards | 398 | 204 |
| Passing: comp–att–int | 17–28–2 | 36–50–1 |
| Turnovers | 1 | 4 |

| Team | Category | Player | Statistics |
|---|---|---|---|
| Louisville | Passing | Chris Redman | 17/28, 204 yards, 2 TD, 2 INT |
| Louisville | Rushing | Otis Floyd | 14 rushes, 62 yards, TD |
| Louisville | Receiving | Rico Williams | 3 receptions, 82 yards |
| Kentucky | Passing | Tim Couch | 36/50, 398 yards, 4 TD, INT |
| Kentucky | Rushing | Anthony White | 16 rushes, 94 yards, TD |
| Kentucky | Receiving | Kio Sanford | 6 receptions, 120 yards, TD |

=== At Mississippi State ===
| | 1 | 2 | 3 | 4 | Total |
|---|---|---|---|---|---|
| Wildcats | 7 | 14 | 6 | 0 | 27 |
| Bulldogs | 3 | 7 | 12 | 13 | 35 |

| Statistics | UK | MSST |
|---|---|---|
| First downs | 23 | 16 |
| Total yards | 377 | 282 |
| Rushing yards | -1 | 170 |
| Passing yards | 378 | 112 |
| Passing: comp–att–int | 40–62–1 | 6–21–1 |
| Turnovers | 2 | 1 |

| Team | Category | Player | Statistics |
|---|---|---|---|
| Kentucky | Passing | Tim Couch | 39/61, 349 yards, 4 TD, INT |
| Kentucky | Rushing | Anthony White | 7 rushes, 55 yards |
| Kentucky | Receiving | Kevin Coleman | 5 receptions, 89 yards, TD |
| Mississippi State | Passing | Matt Wyatt | 6/21, 112 yards, TD, INT |
| Mississippi State | Rushing | James Johnson | 19 rushes, 69 yards, 2 TD |
| Mississippi State | Receiving | Kevin Prentiss | 1 reception, 47 yards, TD |

=== At Indiana ===
| | 1 | 2 | 3 | 4 | Total |
|---|---|---|---|---|---|
| Wildcats | 7 | 14 | 28 | 0 | 49 |
| Hoosiers | 0 | 0 | 0 | 7 | 7 |

| Statistics | UK | IU |
|---|---|---|
| First downs | 31 | 23 |
| Total yards | 546 | 335 |
| Rushing yards | 179 | 47 |
| Passing yards | 367 | 288 |
| Passing: comp–att–int | 29–39–0 | 28–45–2 |
| Turnovers | 1 | 4 |

| Team | Category | Player | Statistics |
|---|---|---|---|
| Kentucky | Passing | Tim Couch | 24/32, 334 yards, 7 TD |
| Kentucky | Rushing | Anthony White | 16 rushes, 131 yards |
| Kentucky | Receiving | Kio Sanford | 4 receptions, 99 yards, TD |
| Indiana | Passing | Jay Rodgers | 28/45, 288 yards, 2 INT |
| Indiana | Rushing | Jason Spear | 12 rushes, 25 yards, TD |
| Indiana | Receiving | Jason Spear | 8 receptions, 105 yards |

=== No. 1 Florida ===
| | 1 | 2 | 3 | 4 | Total |
|---|---|---|---|---|---|
| No. 1 Gators | 28 | 0 | 21 | 6 | 55 |
| Wildcats | 0 | 7 | 7 | 14 | 28 |

| Statistics | FLA | UK |
|---|---|---|
| First downs | 27 | 26 |
| Total yards | 507 | 470 |
| Rushing yards | 174 | 101 |
| Passing yards | 333 | 369 |
| Passing: comp–att–int | 24–37–0 | 34–60–3 |
| Turnovers | 1 | 3 |

| Team | Category | Player | Statistics |
|---|---|---|---|
| Florida | Passing | Doug Johnson | 22/34, 286 yards, 5 TD |
| Florida | Rushing | Fred Taylor | 14 rushes, 126 yards, 2 TD |
| Florida | Receiving | Jacquez Green | 10 receptions, 139 yards, 3 TD |
| Kentucky | Passing | Tim Couch | 33/59, 348 yards, 2 TD, 3 INT |
| Kentucky | Rushing | Anthony White | 14 rushes, 79 yards, TD |
| Kentucky | Receiving | Craig Yeast | 10 receptions, 125 yards |

=== No. 20 Alabama ===
| | 1 | 2 | 3 | 4 | OT | Total |
|---|---|---|---|---|---|---|
| No. 20 Crimson Tide | 7 | 7 | 10 | 10 | 0 | 34 |
| Wildcats | 10 | 3 | 14 | 7 | 6 | 40 |

| Statistics | ALA | UK |
|---|---|---|
| First downs | 20 | 23 |
| Total yards | 410 | 457 |
| Rushing yards | 239 | 102 |
| Passing yards | 171 | 355 |
| Passing: comp–att–int | 16–28–0 | 32–49–3 |
| Turnovers | 1 | 4 |

| Team | Category | Player | Statistics |
|---|---|---|---|
| Alabama | Passing | Freddie Kitchens | 13/24, 125 yards, 2 TD |
| Alabama | Rushing | Curtis Alexander | 15 rushes, 120 yards, TD |
| Alabama | Receiving | Chad Goss | 3 receptions, 59 yards, TD |
| Kentucky | Passing | Tim Couch | 32/49, 355 yards, 4 TD, 3 INT |
| Kentucky | Rushing | Anthony White | 15 rushes, 117 yards |
| Kentucky | Receiving | Derek Homer | 3 receptions, 103 yards, TD |

=== At South Carolina ===
| | 1 | 2 | 3 | 4 | Total |
|---|---|---|---|---|---|
| Wildcats | 14 | 7 | 3 | 0 | 24 |
| Gamecocks | 0 | 24 | 7 | 7 | 38 |

| Statistics | UK | SCAR |
|---|---|---|
| First downs | 23 | 24 |
| Total yards | 426 | 427 |
| Rushing yards | 132 | 204 |
| Passing yards | 294 | 223 |
| Passing: comp–att–int | 31–46–1 | 15–27–0 |
| Turnovers | 2 | 0 |

| Team | Category | Player | Statistics |
|---|---|---|---|
| Kentucky | Passing | Tim Couch | 31/46, 294 yards, 2 TD, INT |
| Kentucky | Rushing | Derek Homer | 10 rushes, 107 yards |
| Kentucky | Receiving | Kevin Coleman | 8 receptions, 87 yards |
| South Carolina | Passing | Anthony Wright | 15/27, 223 yards, 3 TD |
| South Carolina | Rushing | Boo Williams | 24 rushes, 93 yards |
| South Carolina | Receiving | Jermale Kelly | 3 receptions, 59 yards, 2 TD |

=== Northeast Louisiana ===
| | 1 | 2 | 3 | 4 | Total |
|---|---|---|---|---|---|
| Indians | 0 | 7 | 7 | 0 | 14 |
| Wildcats | 21 | 14 | 7 | 7 | 49 |

| Statistics | NELA | UK |
|---|---|---|
| First downs | 14 | 31 |
| Total yards | 218 | 586 |
| Rushing yards | 137 | 126 |
| Passing yards | 81 | 460 |
| Passing: comp–att–int | 10–24–1 | 37–48–1 |
| Turnovers | 1 | 1 |

| Team | Category | Player | Statistics |
|---|---|---|---|
| Northeast Louisiana | Passing | Jason Grein | 4/6, 43 yards, TD |
| Northeast Louisiana | Rushing | Marquis Williams | 15 rushes, 54 yards |
| Northeast Louisiana | Receiving | Marty Booker | 2 receptions, 38 yards |
| Kentucky | Passing | Tim Couch | 34/43, 428 yards, 6 TD, INT |
| Kentucky | Rushing | Anthony White | 11 rushes, 60 yards |
| Kentucky | Receiving | Lance Mickelson | 6 receptions, 131 yards, 3 TD |

=== At No. 16 Georgia ===
| | 1 | 2 | 3 | 4 | Total |
|---|---|---|---|---|---|
| Wildcats | 0 | 7 | 0 | 6 | 13 |
| No. 16 Bulldogs | 0 | 14 | 3 | 6 | 23 |

| Statistics | UK | UGA |
|---|---|---|
| First downs | 28 | 11 |
| Total yards | 436 | 275 |
| Rushing yards | 112 | 220 |
| Passing yards | 324 | 55 |
| Passing: comp–att–int | 41–55–3 | 5–13–0 |
| Turnovers | 3 | 0 |

| Team | Category | Player | Statistics |
|---|---|---|---|
| Kentucky | Passing | Tim Couch | 41/55, 324 yards, TD, 3 INT |
| Kentucky | Rushing | Anthony White | 13 rushes, 57 yards |
| Kentucky | Receiving | Derek Homer | 5 receptions, 64 yards |
| Georgia | Passing | Mike Bobo | 5/13, 55 yards |
| Georgia | Rushing | Robert Edwards | 19 rushes, 186 yards, 2 TD |
| Georgia | Receiving | Corey Allen | 1 reception, 28 yards |

=== No. 16 LSU ===
| | 1 | 2 | 3 | 4 | Total |
|---|---|---|---|---|---|
| No. 16 Tigers | 12 | 8 | 22 | 21 | 63 |
| Wildcats | 0 | 21 | 7 | 0 | 28 |

| Statistics | LSU | UK |
|---|---|---|
| First downs | 32 | 31 |
| Total yards | 613 | 529 |
| Rushing yards | 400 | 99 |
| Passing yards | 213 | 430 |
| Passing: comp–att–int | 15–20–0 | 42–67–3 |
| Turnovers | 0 | 5 |

| Team | Category | Player | Statistics |
|---|---|---|---|
| LSU | Passing | Herb Tyler | 15/20, 213 yards, TD |
| LSU | Rushing | Kevin Faulk | 28 rushes, 212 yards, 5 TD |
| LSU | Receiving | Larry Foster | 5 receptions, 61 yards |
| Kentucky | Passing | Tim Couch | 41/66, 410 yards, 4 TD, 3 INT |
| Kentucky | Rushing | Anthony White | 9 rushes, 63 yards |
| Kentucky | Receiving | Jimmy Robinson | 8 receptions, 100 yards |

=== At Vanderbilt ===
| | 1 | 2 | 3 | 4 | Total |
|---|---|---|---|---|---|
| Wildcats | 0 | 7 | 7 | 7 | 21 |
| Commodores | 0 | 0 | 10 | 0 | 10 |

| Statistics | UK | VAN |
|---|---|---|
| First downs | 13 | 11 |
| Total yards | 234 | 262 |
| Rushing yards | 66 | 51 |
| Passing yards | 168 | 211 |
| Passing: comp–att–int | 17–36–0 | 16–32–3 |
| Turnovers | 0 | 5 |

| Team | Category | Player | Statistics |
|---|---|---|---|
| Kentucky | Passing | Tim Couch | 17/36, 168 yards, TD |
| Kentucky | Rushing | Derek Homer | 6 rushes, 38 yards, TD |
| Kentucky | Receiving | Craig Yeast | 6 receptions, 76 yards, TD |
| Vanderbilt | Passing | Damien Allen | 16/32, 211 yards, TD, 3 INT |
| Vanderbilt | Rushing | Paul Morgan | 12 rushes, 49 yards |
| Vanderbilt | Receiving | Todd Yoder | 7 receptions, 94 yards |

=== No. 5 Tennessee ===
| | 1 | 2 | 3 | 4 | Total |
|---|---|---|---|---|---|
| No. 5 Volunteers | 17 | 7 | 21 | 14 | 59 |
| Wildcats | 7 | 14 | 3 | 7 | 31 |

| Statistics | TENN | UK |
|---|---|---|
| First downs | 30 | 27 |
| Total yards | 695 | 634 |
| Rushing yards | 150 | 158 |
| Passing yards | 545 | 476 |
| Passing: comp–att–int | 26–36–0 | 35–50–3 |
| Turnovers | 2 | 3 |

| Team | Category | Player | Statistics |
|---|---|---|---|
| Tennessee | Passing | Peyton Manning | 25/35, 523 yards, 5 TD |
| Tennessee | Rushing | Jamal Lewis | 21 rushes, 128 yards, 3 TD |
| Tennessee | Receiving | Marcus Nash | 7 receptions, 195 yards, 3 TD |
| Kentucky | Passing | Tim Couch | 35/50, 476 yards, 2 TD, 3 INT |
| Kentucky | Rushing | Derek Homer | 18 rushes, 137 yards |
| Kentucky | Receiving | Kio Sanford | 9 receptions, 147 yards, TD |

== Roster ==
1997 Kentucky Wildcats football team roster
Players
Coaches
Offense

| Pos. | # | Name | Class |
|---|---|---|---|
| QB | 2 | Tim Couch | So |
| RB | 3 | Craig Yeast | Jr |
| WR | 5 | Marvin Love | Jr |
| WR | 6 | Kio Sanford | Sr |
| RB | 32 | Anthony White | So |
| C | 61 | Paul McGonagle | Jr |

Defense

| Pos. | # | Name | Class |
|---|---|---|---|
| CB | 4 | Littleton Ward | Sr |
| FS | 8 | Marlon McCree | Fr |

Special teams

| Pos. | # | Name | Class |
|---|---|---|---|
| K | 9 | Marc Samuel | Fr |
| P | 19 | Jimmy Carter | Jr |
| K | 23 | Brian Johnson | Sr |
| K, P | | Seth Hanson | Fr |

Head coach

- Hal Mumme

Coordinators/assistant coaches

- Tony Franklin
  Running backs
- Mike Leach
  Wide receivers/tight ends
- Guy Morriss
  Offensive line
- Mike Major
  Defensive coordinator/linebackers
- Tom Adams
  Defensive ends
- Mike Fanoga
  Defensive tackles
- Darrell Patterson
  Safeties
- Tim Keane
  Cornerbacks
- Sonny Dykes
  Graduate assistant
- Bob Brush
  Defensive assistant

Legend

- (C) Team captain
- (S) Suspended
- (I) Ineligible
- Injured
- Redshirt

Roster
