= 1997 Alabama Crimson Tide football team =

American college football season

1997 Alabama Crimson Tide football
- Conference: Southeastern Conference
- Western Division
- Record: 4–7 (2–6 SEC)
- Head coach: Mike DuBose (1st season)
- Offensive coordinator: Bruce Arians (1st season)
- Offensive scheme: Split backs
- Defensive coordinator: Ellis Johnson (1st season)
- Base defense: 4–3
- Captains: Curtis Alexander; Paul Pickett; Rod Rutledge; Deshea Townsend
- Home stadium: Bryant–Denny Stadium; Legion Field

1997 Southeastern Conference football standings
	Conf.			Overall
Team	W		L	W		L
Eastern Division
No. 7 Tennessee x$	7	–	1	11	–	2
No. 10 Georgia	6	–	2	10	–	2
No. 4 Florida	6	–	2	10	–	2
South Carolina	3	–	5	5	–	6
Kentucky	2	–	6	5	–	6
Vanderbilt	0	–	8	3	–	8
Western Division
No. 11 Auburn xy	6	–	2	10	–	3
No. 13 LSU x	6	–	2	9	–	3
No. 22 Ole Miss	4	–	4	8	–	4
Mississippi State	4	–	4	7	–	4
Arkansas	2	–	6	4	–	7
Alabama	2	–	6	4	–	7
Championship: Tennessee 30, Auburn 29
$ – Conference champion; x – Division champion/co-champions; Rankings from AP Poll

The 1997 Alabama Crimson Tide football team represented the University of Alabama as a member of the Western Division of the Southeastern Conference (SEC) during the 1997 NCAA Division I-A football season. Led by first-year head coach Mike DuBose, the Crimson Tide compiled an overall record of 4–7, going 2–6 in conference play, tying for fifth place at the bottom of the SEC's Western Division standings. The team played home games at Bryant–Denny Stadium in Tuscaloosa, Alabama, and Legion Field in Birmingham, Alabama.

Alabama suffered its first losing record since the 1984 season.

== Schedule ==
Date	Time	Opponent	Rank	Site	TV	Result	Attendance	Source
August 30	11:30 a.m.	Houston*	No. 16	Legion Field; Birmingham, AL	JPS	W 42–17	81,591	
September 11	7:30 p.m.	at Vanderbilt	No. 15	Vanderbilt Stadium; Nashville, TN	ESPN	W 20–0	41,448	
September 20	11:30 a.m.	Arkansas	No. 11	Bryant–Denny Stadium; Tuscaloosa, AL	JPS	L 16–17	70,123	
September 27	2:00 p.m.	Southern Miss*	No. 21	Legion Field; Birmingham, AL	PPV	W 27–14	83,091	
October 4	6:00 p.m.	at Kentucky	No. 20	Commonwealth Stadium; Lexington, KY	PPV	L 34–40 ^{OT}	59,226	
October 18	6:00 p.m.	No. 9 Tennessee		Legion Field; Birmingham, AL (Third Saturday in October)	ESPN	L 21–38	83,091	
October 25	11:30 a.m.	at No. 25 Ole Miss		Vaught–Hemingway Stadium; Oxford, MS (rivalry)	JPS	W 29–20	41,548	
November 1	1:00 p.m.	Louisiana Tech*^{†}		Bryant–Denny Stadium; Tuscaloosa, AL	PPV	L 20–26	70,123	
November 8	2:30 p.m.	No. 14 LSU		Bryant–Denny Stadium; Tuscaloosa, AL (rivalry)	CBS	L 0–27	70,123	
November 15	11:30 a.m.	No. 17 Mississippi State		Bryant–Denny Stadium; Tuscaloosa, AL (rivalry)	JPS	L 20–32	70,123	
November 22	6:00 p.m.	at No. 13 Auburn		Jordan–Hare Stadium; Auburn, AL (Iron Bowl)	ESPN	L 17–18	85,214	
*Non-conference game; ^{†}Homecoming; Rankings from AP Poll released prior to the game; All times are in Central time

== Rankings ==
Ranking movements Legend: ██ Increase in ranking ██ Decrease in ranking — = Not ranked
	Week																	
Poll	Pre	1	2	3	4	5	6	7	8	9	10	11	12	13	14	15	16	Final
AP	15	16	15	15	11	21	20	—	—	—	—	—	—	—	—	—	—	—
Coaches	15		15	14	11	19	20	—	—	—	—	—	—	—	—	—	—	—

== Game summaries ==
=== Houston ===
	1	2	3	4	Total
Cougars	0	7	7	3	17
No. 16 Crimson Tide	21	7	0	14	42

A sell-out crowd filled Legion Field as the Mike Dubose era got off to a great start with the Crimson Tide rolling to a big win over Houston. Alabama's 42 points was the most any Alabama team had put up in a game since the season opener in 1994.

Statistics	Houston	Alabama
First downs	15	25
Total yards	384	466
Rushing yards	114	213
Passing yards	270	253
Turnovers	2	3
Time of possession	28:01	31:59

Team	Category	Player	Statistics
Houston	Passing	Tyson Helton	7–14, 143 yards, 1 TD
Houston	Rushing	Ketric Sanford	12 carries, 67 yards, 1 TD
Houston	Receiving	Robbie Wheeler	6 receptions, 107 yards
Alabama	Passing	Freddie Kitchens	12–19, 168 yards, 1 TD, 1 INT
Alabama	Rushing	Shaun Alexander	11 carries, 96 yards, 1 TD
Alabama	Receiving	Curtis Alexander; Chad Goss	2 receptions, 50 yards, 1 TD; 2 receptions, 50 yards

=== Vanderbilt ===
	1	2	3	4	Total
No. 15 Crimson Tide	7	0	3	10	20
Commodores	0	0	0	0	0

Alabama defense held Vanderbilt offense to 124 yards as the Crimson Tide won its first road and conference game of the year in shutout fashion.

Statistics	Alabama	Vanderbilt
First downs	9	9
Total yards	238	124
Rushing yards	75	66
Passing yards	163	58
Turnovers	2	0
Time of possession	30:16	29:44

Team	Category	Player	Statistics
Alabama	Passing	Freddie Kitchens	10–18, 124 yards, 1 TD, 2 INT's
Alabama	Rushing	Dennis Riddle	13 carries, 31 yards
Alabama	Receiving	Quincy Jackson	3 receptions, 67 yards
Vanderbilt	Passing	Damian Allen	6–22, 58 yards
Vanderbilt	Rushing	Jimmy Williams	10 carries, 43 yards
Vanderbilt	Receiving	Jimmy Williams	3 receptions, 41 yards

=== Arkansas ===
	1	2	3	4	Total
Razorbacks	3	0	7	7	17
No. 11 Crimson Tide	3	3	3	7	16

For the second time in a row, Arkansas came to Bryant-Denny Stadium and upset a ranked Alabama team by one point. Alabama held a 16-10 lead late in the game, but an Anthony Eubanks touchdown grab of 29 yards from Clint Stoerner gave Arkansas a one-point win.

Statistics	Arkansas	Alabama
First downs	14	15
Total yards	270	247
Rushing yards	70	106
Passing yards	200	141
Turnovers	0	0
Time of possession	29:02	30:58

Team	Category	Player	Statistics
Arkansas	Passing	Clint Stoerner	16–21, 200 yards, 1 TD
Arkansas	Rushing	Chrys Chukwuma	12 carries, 65 yards
Arkansas	Receiving	Anthony Eubanks	7 receptions, 104 yards
Alabama	Passing	Freddie Kitchens	10–17, 84 yards
Alabama	Rushing	Dennis Riddle	12 carries, 49 yards
Alabama	Receiving	Calvin Hall	4 receptions, 48 yards

=== Southern Miss ===
	1	2	3	4	Total
Golden Eagles	0	10	3	0	13
No. 21 Crimson Tide	0	10	7	10	27

After being tied at halftime, Alabama outscored Southern Miss 17-3 in the second half, led by the Alabama defense forcing three Southern Miss turnovers.

Statistics	Southern Miss	Alabama
First downs	19	12
Total yards	293	275
Rushing yards	67	105
Passing yards	226	170
Turnovers	4	0
Time of possession	29:34	30:26

Team	Category	Player	Statistics
Southern Miss	Passing	Lee Roberts	21–40, 226 yards, 1 TD, 2 INT's
Southern Miss	Rushing	Harold Shaw	20 carries, 79 yards
Southern Miss	Receiving	Sherrod Gideon	7 receptions, 132 yards
Alabama	Passing	Freddie Kitchens	11–18, 167 yards, 2 TD's
Alabama	Rushing	Shaun Alexander	16 carries, 66 yards
Alabama	Receiving	Shamari Buchanan	2 receptions, 58 yards

=== Kentucky ===
	1	2	3	4	OT	Total
Wildcats	10	3	14	7	6	40
No. 20 Crimson Tide	7	7	10	10	0	34

A back and forth shootout ended with a 26-yard game-winning touchdown pass from Kentucky QB Tim Couch to give Kentucky its first win over Alabama since 1922. Alabama had the ball first in overtime but, a Chad Goss fumble gave Kentucky an opportunity to score and win with their possession. This was the first overtime game ever for both teams.

Statistics	Alabama	Kentucky
First downs	20	23
Total yards	410	457
Rushing yards	239	102
Passing yards	171	355
Turnovers	2	4
Time of possession	35:04	24:56

Team	Category	Player	Statistics
Alabama	Passing	Freddie Kitchens	13–24, 125 yards, 2 TD's, 1 INT
Alabama	Rushing	Curtis Alexander	15 carries, 120 yards, 1 TD
Alabama	Receiving	Chad Goss	3 receptions, 59 yards, 1 TD
Kentucky	Passing	Tim Couch	32–49, 355 yards, 4 TD's 3 INT's
Kentucky	Rushing	Anthony White	15 carries, 117 yards
Kentucky	Receiving	Derek Homer	3 receptions, 103 yards, 1 TD

=== Tennessee ===
	1	2	3	4	Total
No. 9 Volunteers	7	14	10	7	38
Crimson Tide	6	0	8	7	21

For the third consecutive year, Tennessee defeated Alabama. Alabama opened with two early field goals, briefly holding a 6–0 lead, but Tennessee's response was emphatic—28 unanswered points that left no room for a comeback. This contest also carried historical weight, serving as the final Third Saturday in October matchup played at Legion Field, closing a memorable chapter in the rivalry’s history.

Statistics	Tennessee	Alabama
First downs	23	13
Total yards	393	225
Rushing yards	89	72
Passing yards	304	153
Turnovers	2	1
Time of possession	31:35	28:25

Team	Category	Player	Statistics
Tennessee	Passing	Peyton Manning	23–37, 304 yards, 3 TD's
Tennessee	Rushing	Jamal Lewis	17 carries, 67 yards
Tennessee	Receiving	Peerless Price	4 receptions, 78 yards, 1 TD
Alabama	Passing	Freddie Kitchens	13–39, 153 yards, 1 TD, 1 INT
Alabama	Rushing	Curtis Alexander	16 carries, 38 yards
Alabama	Receiving	Shamari Buchanan	6 receptions, 66 yards

=== Ole Miss ===
	1	2	3	4	Total
Crimson Tide	0	7	10	12	29
No. 25 Rebels	7	7	0	6	20

Mike DuBose got his first win against a ranked team as the Crimson Tide ended their two-game losing streak with a win against Ole Miss.

Statistics	Alabama	Ole Miss
First downs	22	19
Total yards	526	420
Rushing yards	297	163
Passing yards	229	257
Turnovers	2	3
Time of possession	36:37	23:23

Team	Category	Player	Statistics
Alabama	Passing	Freddie Kitchens	15–22, 229 yards, 1 TD
Alabama	Rushing	Curtis Alexander	16 carries, 141 yards, 1 TD
Alabama	Receiving	Quincy Jackson	5 receptions, 119 yards
Ole Miss	Passing	Stewart Patridge	22–37, 257 yards, 1 TD
Ole Miss	Rushing	John Aver	15 carries, 148 yards, 1 TD
Ole Miss	Receiving	Andre Rone	4 receptions, 67 yards

=== Louisiana Tech ===
	1	2	3	4	Total
Bulldogs	10	3	7	6	26
Crimson Tide	7	0	6	7	20

For the first time since the 1990 season, Alabama lost a non-conference game. This was also the first homecoming loss for Alabama since 1990, and the first time Louisiana Tech had ever defeated Alabama. Coming into the game, the Bulldogs had the third-ranked passing offense in college football.

Statistics	Louisiana Tech	Alabama
First downs	23	23
Total yards	522	389
Rushing yards	161	127
Passing yards	361	262
Turnovers	1	0
Time of possession	33:50	26:10

Team	Category	Player	Statistics
Louisiana Tech	Passing	Tim Rattay	29–48, 361 yards, 3 TD's
Louisiana Tech	Rushing	Bobby Ray Tell	17 carries, 98 yards
Louisiana Tech	Receiving	Troy Edwards	9 receptions, 126 yards, 1 TD
Alabama	Passing	Freddie Kitchens	14–32, 228 yards, 2 TD's
Alabama	Rushing	Curtis Alexander	18 carries, 79 yards, 1 TD
Alabama	Receiving	Shamari Buchanan	4 receptions, 55 yards

=== LSU ===
	1	2	3	4	Total
No. 14 Tigers	7	7	0	13	27
Crimson Tide	0	0	0	0	0

LSU returned the favor after Alabama shutout LSU in Tiger Stadium in 1996 by shutting out Alabama at Bryant-Denny Stadium. This was the first time Alabama had been shutout since 1991.

Statistics	LSU	Alabama
First downs	17	15
Total yards	370	250
Rushing yards	265	157
Passing yards	105	93
Turnovers	1	2
Time of possession	30:22	29:38

Team	Category	Player	Statistics
LSU	Passing	Herb Tyler	7–13, 105 yards
LSU	Rushing	Kevin Faulk	27 carries, 168 yards, 2 TD's
LSU	Receiving	Abram Booty	3 receptions, 66 yards
Alabama	Passing	Freddie Kitchens	8–24, 93 yards
Alabama	Rushing	Curtis Alexander	24 carries, 95 yards
Alabama	Receiving	Quincy Jackson	1 reception, 22 yards

=== Mississippi State ===
	1	2	3	4	Total
No. 17 Bulldogs	14	6	9	3	32
Crimson Tide	14	0	6	0	20

For the first time since 1957, Mississippi State won in Bryant-Denny Stadium. The loss also meant Alabama would not win a game at Bryant-Denny Stadium for the first time since 1955, and guaranteed Alabama its first losing season since 1984.

Statistics	Mississippi State	Alabama
First downs	23	13
Total yards	500	247
Rushing yards	347	113
Passing yards	153	134
Turnovers	0	0
Time of possession	31:02	28:58

Team	Category	Player	Statistics
Mississippi State	Passing	Matt Wyatt	10–20, 153 yards, 1 TD
Mississippi State	Rushing	J. J. Johnson	23 carries, 198 yards, 2 TD's
Mississippi State	Receiving	Lamont Woodberry	4 receptions, 45 yards
Alabama	Passing	Lance Tucker	7–11, 81 yards, 1 TD
Alabama	Rushing	Dennis Riddle	13 carries, 84 yards, 1 TD
Alabama	Receiving	Quincy Jackson	3 receptions, 63 yards

=== Auburn ===
	1	2	3	4	Total
Crimson Tide	0	10	7	0	17
No. 13 Tigers	6	0	6	6	18

Despite being an underdog, Alabama led for most of the game and be in a position to put the game away but an Ed Scissum fumble recovered by Auburn put them in field goal range to take the lead and ultimately give them the win. Alabama tried a 57-yard field goal with A.J. Diaz as time expired but it fell short. Seven losses was the most Alabama had had in a season since 1957.

Statistics	Alabama	Auburn
First downs	15	19
Total yards	299	275
Rushing yards	156	62
Passing yards	143	213
Turnovers	2	3
Time of possession	31:39	28:21

Team	Category	Player	Statistics
Alabama	Passing	Freddie Kitchens	12–18, 134 yards, 1 TD
Alabama	Rushing	Shaun Alexander	13 carries, 65 yards, 1 TD
Alabama	Receiving	Quincy Jackson	7 receptions, 79 yards
Auburn	Passing	Dameyune Craig	14–34, 213 yards, 2 INT's
Auburn	Rushing	Rusty Williams	6 carries, 27 yards
Auburn	Receiving	Hicks Poor	5 receptions, 55 yards

== Coaching staff ==
Name	Position	Consecutive seasons at Alabama
Mike DuBose	Head coach	1st
Bruce Arians	Offensive coordinator/Quarterback coach	1st
Dabo Swinney	Tight end	5th
Neil Callaway	Offensive line coach	1st
Woody McCorvey	Wide receivers coach	8th
Ivy Williams	Running backs coach	4th
Ellis Johnson	Defensive coordinator/Defensive line	1st
Curley Hallman	Secondary coach	2nd
Jeff Rouzie	Linebackers coach	7th
Danny Pearman	Special teams coordinator	7th
Mickey Conn	Graduate Assistant	2nd
