= 1997 Vanderbilt Commodores football team =

American college football season

1997 Vanderbilt Commodores football
- Conference: Southeastern conference
- Eastern Division
- Record: 3–8 (0–8 SEC)
- Head coach: Woody Widenhofer (1st season)
- Offensive coordinator: Ed Lambert (1st season)
- Offensive scheme: Multiple
- Defensive coordinator: Norm Parker (1st season)
- Base defense: 4–3
- Captains: Jamie Duncan; Corey Chavous; Jay Stallworth; Damian Allen; John Bradley
- Home stadium: Vanderbilt Stadium

1997 Southeastern Conference football standings
	Conf.			Overall
Team	W		L	W		L
Eastern Division
No. 7 Tennessee x$	7	–	1	11	–	2
No. 10 Georgia	6	–	2	10	–	2
No. 4 Florida	6	–	2	10	–	2
South Carolina	3	–	5	5	–	6
Kentucky	2	–	6	5	–	6
Vanderbilt	0	–	8	3	–	8
Western Division
No. 11 Auburn xy	6	–	2	10	–	3
No. 13 LSU x	6	–	2	9	–	3
No. 22 Ole Miss	4	–	4	8	–	4
Mississippi State	4	–	4	7	–	4
Arkansas	2	–	6	4	–	7
Alabama	2	–	6	4	–	7
Championship: Tennessee 30, Auburn 29
$ – Conference champion; x – Division champion/co-champions; Rankings from AP Poll

The 1997 Vanderbilt Commodores football team represented Vanderbilt University as a member of the Eastern Division of the Southeastern Conference (SEC) during the 1997 NCAA Division I-A football season. Led by first-year head coach Woody Widenhofer, the Commodores compiled an overall record of 3–8 with a mark of 0–8 in conference play, placing last out of six teams in the SEC's Eastern Division. The team played home games at Vanderbilt Stadium in Nashville, Tennessee.

The low point of the Commodores' season came in their fifth game against 13th-ranked LSU, coached by Gerry DiNardo, Vanderbilt's head coach from 1991 to 1994. After scoring a touchdown with 12 seconds remaining to cut the Tigers' lead to 7–6, Widenhofer kept the offense on the field, intending to go for a two-point conversion and the win. After LSU called timeout, the Commodores were called twice for delay of game, pushing the ball back to the 13-yard line and forcing Widenhofer to send in kicker John Markham to attempt an extra point which would have forced overtime. Markham, who missed a 38-yard field goal earlier in the game, had his kick blocked, allowing the Tigers to escape despite gaining a meager 230 total yards.

== Schedule ==
Date	Time	Opponent	Site	TV	Result	Attendance	Source
August 30	6:00 p.m.	North Texas*	Vanderbilt Stadium; Nashville, TN		W 29–12	38,281	
September 11	7:00 p.m.	No. 15 Alabama	Vanderbilt Stadium; Nashville, TN	ESPN	L 0–20	41,448	
September 20	7:00 p.m.	TCU*	Vanderbilt Stadium; Nashville, TN		W 40–16	34,824	
September 27	6:00 p.m.	at Ole Miss	Vaught–Hemingway Stadium; Oxford, MS (rivalry)		L 3–15	36,417	
October 4	2:30 p.m.	No. 13 LSU	Vanderbilt Stadium; Nashville, TN	PPV	L 6–7	37,045	
October 11	3:00 p.m.	at Northern Illinois*	Huskie Stadium; DeKalb, IL		W 17–7	17,567	
October 18	8:00 p.m.	No. 21 Georgia	Vanderbilt Stadium; Nashville, TN (rivalry)	ESPN2	L 13–34	35,124	
October 25	6:00 p.m.	at South Carolina	Williams–Brice Stadium; Columbia, SC		L 3–35	79,014	
November 8	11:30 a.m.	at No. 13 Florida	Ben Hill Griffin Stadium; Gainesville, FL	JPS	L 7–20	85,301	
November 15	1:00 p.m.	Kentucky	Vanderbilt Stadium; Nashville, TN (rivalry)		L 10–21	40,256	
November 29	11:00 a.m.	at No. 3 Tennessee	Neyland Stadium; Knoxville, TN (rivalry)	CBS	L 10–17	106,683	
*Non-conference game; Rankings from AP Poll released prior to the game; All times are in Central time

== Roster ==
1997 Vanderbilt Commodores football team roster
Players
Coaches
Offense

Pos.	#	Name	Class
QB	6	Greg Zolman	Fr
QB	17	Damian Allen	Sr
RB	23	Tyrone Yarbrough	Jr
RB	35	Marcus A. Williams	Sr
G	51	Jim Anguiano	Jr
WR	81	Todd Yoder	So

Defense

Pos.	#	Name	Class
CB	1	Fred Vinson	Jr
CB	4	Corey Chavous	Sr
CB	30	Damien Charley	Jr
LB	34	Carlton Hall	Sr
LB	49	Jamie Duncan	Sr

Special teams

Pos.	#	Name	Class

Head coach

- Woody Widenhofer

Coordinators/assistant coaches

Legend

- (C) Team captain
- (S) Suspended
- (I) Ineligible
- Injured
- Redshirt

Roster
Last update: 1998-12-02
