= 1997 LSU Tigers football team =

American college football season

1997 LSU Tigers football

SEC Western Division co-champion Independence Bowl champion

Independence Bowl, W 27–9 vs. Notre Dame
- Conference: Southeastern Conference
- Western Division

Ranking
- Coaches: No. 13
- AP: No. 13
- Record: 9–3 (6–2 SEC)
- Head coach: Gerry DiNardo (3rd season)
- Offensive coordinator: Morris Watts (3rd season)
- Offensive scheme: Multiple pro sets
- Defensive coordinator: Carl Reese (3rd season)
- Base defense: Multiple 4–3
- Home stadium: Tiger Stadium

1997 Southeastern Conference football standings
	Conf.			Overall
Team	W		L	W		L
Eastern Division
No. 7 Tennessee x$	7	–	1	11	–	2
No. 10 Georgia	6	–	2	10	–	2
No. 4 Florida	6	–	2	10	–	2
South Carolina	3	–	5	5	–	6
Kentucky	2	–	6	5	–	6
Vanderbilt	0	–	8	3	–	8
Western Division
No. 11 Auburn xy	6	–	2	10	–	3
No. 13 LSU x	6	–	2	9	–	3
No. 22 Ole Miss	4	–	4	8	–	4
Mississippi State	4	–	4	7	–	4
Arkansas	2	–	6	4	–	7
Alabama	2	–	6	4	–	7
Championship: Tennessee 30, Auburn 29
$ – Conference champion; x – Division champion/co-champions; Rankings from AP Poll

The 1997 LSU Tigers football team represented Louisiana State University as a member of the Western Division of the Southeastern Conference (SEC) during the 1997 NCAA Division I-A football season. Led by third-year head coach Gerry DiNardo, the Tigers compiled an overall record of 9–3 with a mark of 6–2, sharing the SEC's Western Division title Auburn. By virtue of a head-to-head loss to Auburn, LSU was left out of the SEC Championship Game. The LSU Tigers were invited to the Independence Bowl, where they defeated Notre Dame. The team played home games at Tiger Stadium in Baton Rouge, Louisiana.

The Tigers began the season with high expectations following their first 10-win season since 1987. LSU's season was highlighted by a stunning 28–21 home upset of the top ranked Florida Gators, ending Florida's 25-game winning streak in SEC play and nine-game winning streak against LSU. The Tigers also shut out Alabama 27–0 at Tuscaloosa, paying back the Crimson Tide for a 26–0 loss the previous season in Baton Rouge. it was the first time LSU defeated Florida and Alabama in the same season since 1986 and only the second time since 1971.

Despite the highs, LSU also experienced two embarrassing home losses. The first was to Ole Miss one week after the Tigers' conquest of then-No. 1 Florida, a loss made more perplexing by the 38–9 and 39–7 margins by which LSU crushed the Rebels in 1995 and 1996. The second was to Notre Dame, which came to Baton Rouge at 4–5, needing three consecutive victories just to qualify for a bowl. In a stunning 24–6 triumph, the Irish rushed for 232 yards and played their first penalty-free and turnover-free game in program history.

LSU was also fortunate to escape with a 7–6 victory at Vanderbilt, DiNardo's former employer. The Commodores scored a late touchdown and were lined up to go for a two-point conversion and a potential 8–7 win, but two delay of game penalties convinced Vanderbilt coach Woody Widenhofer to instead play for overtime. LSU's Arnold Miller preserved the win by blocking John Markham's extra point attempt.

The Tigers tied for the SEC West title for the second straight year, but Auburn had won a dramatic game in Baton Rouge earlier in the season and therefore represented the West in the SEC Championship Game.

== Schedule ==
Date	Time	Opponent	Rank	Site	TV	Result	Attendance	Source
September 6	7:00 p.m.	UTEP*	No. 10	Tiger Stadium; Baton Rouge, LA		W 55–3	80,015	
September 13	8:00 p.m.	at Mississippi State	No. 10	Scott Field; Starkville, MS (rivalry)	ESPN	W 24–9	40,030	
September 20	6:30 p.m.	No. 12 Auburn	No. 10	Tiger Stadium; Baton Rouge, LA (rivalry)	ESPN	L 28–31	80,538	
September 27	7:00 p.m.	Akron*^{†}	No. 13	Tiger Stadium; Baton Rouge, LA		W 56–0	79,772	
October 4	2:30 p.m.	at Vanderbilt	No. 13	Vanderbilt Stadium; Nashville, TN	PPV	W 7–6	37,045	
October 11	6:00 p.m.	No. 1 Florida	No. 14	Tiger Stadium; Baton Rouge, LA (rivalry, College GameDay)	ESPN	W 28–21	80,677	
October 18	11:30 a.m.	Ole Miss	No. 8	Tiger Stadium; Baton Rouge, LA (Magnolia Bowl)	JPS	L 21–36	80,442	
November 1	5:30 p.m.	at Kentucky	No. 16	Commonwealth Stadium; Lexington, KY	ESPN2	W 63–28	58,450	
November 8	2:30 p.m.	at Alabama	No. 14	Bryant–Denny Stadium; Tuscaloosa, AL (rivalry)	CBS	W 27–0	70,123	
November 15	2:30 p.m.	Notre Dame*	No. 11	Tiger Stadium; Baton Rouge, LA	CBS	L 6–24	80,566	
November 28	1:30 p.m.	Arkansas	No. 17	Tiger Stadium; Baton Rouge, LA (rivalry)	CBS	W 31–21	79,619	
December 28	7:00 p.m.	vs. Notre Dame*	No. 15	Independence Stadium; Shreveport, LA (Independence Bowl)	ESPN	W 27–9	50,459	
*Non-conference game; ^{†}Homecoming; Rankings from AP Poll released prior to the game; All times are in Central time

== Rankings ==
Ranking movements Legend: ██ Increase in ranking ██ Decrease in ranking
	Week																	
Poll	Pre	1	2	3	4	5	6	7	8	9	10	11	12	13	14	15	16	Final
AP	10	10	10	10	10	13	13	14	8	17	16	14	11	20	17	16	15	13
Coaches	11		11	11	10	15	14	14	10	15	14	12	11	18	17	16	15	13
