= 1997 Florida Gators football team =

American college football season

1997 Florida Gators football

Florida Citrus Bowl champion

Florida Citrus Bowl, W 21–6 vs. Penn State
- Conference: Southeastern Conference
- Eastern Division

Ranking
- Coaches: No. 6
- AP: No. 4
- Record: 10–2 (6–2 SEC)
- Head coach: Steve Spurrier (8th season)
- Offensive coordinator: Carl Franks (3rd season)
- Offensive scheme: Fun and gun
- Defensive coordinator: Bob Stoops (2nd season)
- Base defense: 4–3
- Home stadium: Ben Hill Griffin Stadium

1997 Southeastern Conference football standings
| | Conf. | | | Overall |
| Team | W | | L | W | | L |
|---|---|---|---|---|---|---|
Eastern Division
| No. 7 Tennessee x$ | 7 | – | 1 | 11 | – | 2 |
| No. 10 Georgia | 6 | – | 2 | 10 | – | 2 |
| No. 4 Florida | 6 | – | 2 | 10 | – | 2 |
| South Carolina | 3 | – | 5 | 5 | – | 6 |
| Kentucky | 2 | – | 6 | 5 | – | 6 |
| Vanderbilt | 0 | – | 8 | 3 | – | 8 |
Western Division
| No. 11 Auburn xy | 6 | – | 2 | 10 | – | 3 |
| No. 13 LSU x | 6 | – | 2 | 9 | – | 3 |
| No. 22 Ole Miss | 4 | – | 4 | 8 | – | 4 |
| Mississippi State | 4 | – | 4 | 7 | – | 4 |
| Arkansas | 2 | – | 6 | 4 | – | 7 |
| Alabama | 2 | – | 6 | 4 | – | 7 |
Championship: Tennessee 30, Auburn 29
$ – Conference champion; x – Division champion/co-champions; Rankings from AP Poll

The 1997 Florida Gators football team represented the University of Florida as a member of the Eastern Division of the Southeastern Conference (SEC) during the 1997 NCAA Division I-A football season. Led by eighth-year head coach Steve Spurrier, the Gators compiled an overall record of 10–2 with a mark of 6–2 in conference play, tying for second place among the six SEC Eastern Division teams. Florida was invited to the Florida Citrus Bowl, where the Gators defeated Penn State. The team played home games at Ben Hill Griffin Stadium in Gainesville, Florida.

== Schedule ==
| Date | Opponent | Rank | Site | TV | Result | Attendance | Source |
|---|---|---|---|---|---|---|---|
| August 30 | Southern Miss* | No. 2 | Ben Hill Griffin Stadium; Gainesville, FL | ESPN2 | W 21–6 | 85,439 | |
| September 6 | Central Michigan* | No. 2 | Ben Hill Griffin Stadium; Gainesville, FL | PPV | W 82–6 | 85,347 | |
| September 20 | No. 4 Tennessee | No. 3 | Ben Hill Griffin Stadium; Gainesville, FL (rivalry, College GameDay) | CBS | W 33–20 | 85,714 | |
| September 27 | at Kentucky | No. 1 | Commonwealth Stadium; Lexington, KY (rivalry) | CBS | W 55–28 | 59,244 | |
| October 4 | Arkansas | No. 1 | Ben Hill Griffin Stadium; Gainesville, FL | ESPN2 | W 56–7 | 85,253 | |
| October 11 | at No. 14 LSU | No. 1 | Tiger Stadium; Baton Rouge, LA (rivalry, College GameDay) | ESPN | L 21–28 | 80,677 | |
| October 18 | at No. 6 Auburn | No. 7 | Jordan-Hare Stadium; Auburn, AL (rivalry, College GameDay) | CBS | W 24–10 | 85,244 | |
| November 1 | vs. No. 14 Georgia | No. 6 | Alltel Stadium; Jacksonville, FL (rivalry) | CBS | L 17–37 | 84,297 | |
| November 8 | Vanderbilt^{†} | No. 13 | Ben Hill Griffin Stadium; Gainesville, FL | JPS | W 20–7 | 85,305 | |
| November 15 | at South Carolina | No. 12 | Williams–Brice Stadium; Columbia, SC | JPS | W 48–21 | 80,072 | |
| November 22 | No. 2 Florida State* | No. 10 | Ben Hill Griffin Stadium; Gainesville, FL (rivalry, College GameDay) | CBS | W 32–29 | 85,677 | |
| January 1, 1998 | vs. No. 11 Penn State* | No. 6 | Florida Citrus Bowl; Orlando, FL (Florida Citrus Bowl) | ABC | W 21–6 | 72,940 | |
*Non-conference game; ^{†}Homecoming; Rankings from AP Poll released prior to the game

== Rankings ==
Ranking movements Legend: ██ Increase in ranking ██ Decrease in ranking ( ) = First-place votes
| | Week | | | | | | | | | | | | | | | | | |
| Poll | Pre | 1 | 2 | 3 | 4 | 5 | 6 | 7 | 8 | 9 | 10 | 11 | 12 | 13 | 14 | 15 | 16 | Final |
|---|---|---|---|---|---|---|---|---|---|---|---|---|---|---|---|---|---|---|
| AP | 2 (12) | 2 (14) | 2 (14) | 2 (15) | 3 (14) | 1 (32) | 1 (36) | 1 (35) | 7 | 6 | 6 | 13 | 12 | 10 | 7 | 6 | 6 | 4 |
| Coaches | 1 (19) | 1 (19) | 1 (25) | 1 (25) | 1 (25) | 1 (43) | 1 (45) | 1 (48) | 6 | 6 | 6 | 13 | 12 | 10 | 8 | 8 | 8 | 6 |

== Game summaries ==
=== Tennessee ===
#4 Tennessee Volunteers (2–0) at #3 Florida Gators (2–0)

| Quarter | 1 | 2 | 3 | 4 | Total |
|---|---|---|---|---|---|
| Tennessee | 0 | 7 | 7 | 6 | 20 |
| Florida | 14 | 6 | 6 | 7 | 33 |

at Ben Hill Griffith Stadium, Gainesville, Florida

- Date: September 20
- Game time: 3:30 p.m. EDT
- Game weather: Sunny, 95 °F (35 °C)
- Game attendance: 85,714
- Box Score, Box Score/Recap

Game information

First quarter

- UF – Jamie Richardson 11-yard pass from Doug Johnson (Collins Cooper kick), 9:43. Florida 7–0.
- UF – Tony George 88-yard interception return (Collins Cooper kick), 0:15. Florida 14–0.

Second quarter

- UT – Jermaine Copeland 22-yard pass from Peyton Manning (Jeff Hall kick), 1:33. Florida 14–7.
- UF – Jacquez Green 19-yard pass from Doug Johnson (kick failed), 0:45. Florida 20–7.

Third quarter

- UF – Collins Cooper 37-yard field goal, 8:33. Florida 23–7.
- UF – Collins Cooper 40-yard field goal, 3:44. Florida 26–7.
- UT – Jermaine Copeland 8-yard pass from Peyton Manning (Jeff Hall kick), 2:32. Florida 26–14.

Fourth quarter

- UF – Taran Ross 30-yard pass from Doug Johnson (Collins Cooper kick), 6:23. Florida 33–14.
- UT – Cedrick Wilson 16-yard pass from Peyton Manning (pass failed), 2:21. Florida 33–20.

Top passers

- UT – Peyton Manning – 29/51, 353 yards, 3 TD, 2 INT
- UF – Doug Johnson – 14/32, 261 yards, 3 TD, 2 INT

Top rushers

- UT – Mark Levine – 4 rushes, 27 yards
- UF – Fred Taylor – 17 rushes, 134 yards

Top receivers

- UT – Andy McCullough – 5 receptions, 105 yards
- UF – Jacquez Green – 8 receptions, 185 yards, TD

The Gators seemed poised for another title, never trailing Manning-led Tennessee at home to regain the top spot in the polls.Tony George memorably returned an interception 88 yards for a score. Peyton Manning went on to be the first overall pick in the NFL draft and break numerous NFL records, but ended his career without a win against Florida.

=== At LSU ===
They struggled midway through the schedule, however, first losing to LSU on the road. Humiliated by the previous season's 56–13 thrashing, LSU came into the 1997 game ready to play. Once again, the Gators were favored in this matchup in Baton Rouge. But it was LSU who jumped out to a big early lead, scoring two touchdowns in the first 8 minutes on runs by Herb Tyler and Tommy Banks. The Gators came right back with two TD runs by Fred Taylor, each of which capped off an 80-yard drive.

Then, Doug Johnson threw an ill-advised pass, and Cedric Donaldson picked it off and returned it for a touchdown to give LSU a 21–14 lead. The Gators' frustration mounted when another Johnson pass was picked off, this time by Mark Roman, and when Herb Tyler scored another touchdown to give LSU a 28–14 lead with 11:40 to go, the Gators appeared to be in big trouble.

Undaunted, Johnson tried to redeem himself with a 13-play, 78-yard drive that ended with Fred Taylor banging into the end zone to cut the Tigers' lead to 28–21. LSU could do nothing with their next possession, and Doug Johnson began moving the ball downfield again. He then faced a rush on a third and two and threw up a Hail Mary which was intercepted by Raion Hill. The Tigers held on for the 28–21 upset.

=== At Auburn ===
#7 Florida Gators (5–1) at #6 Auburn Tigers (6–0)

| Quarter | 1 | 2 | 3 | 4 | Total |
|---|---|---|---|---|---|
| Florida | 10 | 0 | 7 | 7 | 24 |
| Auburn | 7 | 3 | 0 | 0 | 10 |

at Jordan–Hare Stadium, Auburn, Alabama

- Date: October 18
- Game time: 2:30 p.m. CDT
- Game weather: Partly cloudy, 65 °F (18 °C)
- Game attendance: 85,244
- Referee: A. Sizemore
- Box Score

Game information

First quarter

- UF – Jamie Richardson 12-yard pass from Jacquez Green (Collins Cooper kick), 11:00. Florida 7–0. Drive: 4 plays, 43 yards, 1:41.
- UF – Collins Cooper 22-yard field goal, 5:49. Florida 10–0. Drive: 8 plays, 19 yards, 4:03.
- AUB – Tyrone Dillard 15-yard pass from Dameyune Craig (Jaret Holmes kick), 0:16. Florida 10–7. Drive: 5 plays, 49 yards, 1:56.

Second quarter

- AUB – Jaret Holmes 20-yard field goal, 0:00. Tie 10–10. Drive: 11 plays, 81 yards, 2:28.

Third quarter

- UF – Jacquez Green 10-yard pass from Noah Brindise (Collins Cooper kick), 7:50. Florida 17–10. Drive: 14 plays, 97 yards, 5:20.

Fourth quarter

- UF – Jacquez Green 5-yard run (Collins Cooper kick), 4:27. Florida 24–10. Drive: 2 plays, 6 yards, 0:49.

Top passers

- UF – Jesse Palmer – 8/14, 92 yards, 2 INT
- AUB – Dameyune Craig – 18/34, 187 yards, TD, INT

Top rushers

- UF – Fred Taylor – 34 rushes, 140 yards
- AUB – Rusty Williams – 8 rushes, 22 yards

Top receivers

- UF – Travis McGriff – 3 receptions, 44 yards
- AUB – Karsten Bailey – 4 receptions, 56 yards

=== Vs. Georgia ===
#6 Florida Gators (6–1) vs. #17 Georgia Bulldogs (6–1)

| Quarter | 1 | 2 | 3 | 4 | Total |
|---|---|---|---|---|---|
| Georgia | 7 | 7 | 7 | 16 | 37 |
| Florida | 0 | 3 | 14 | 0 | 17 |

at Alltel Stadium, Jacksonville, Florida

- Date: November 1
- Game attendance: 84,297
- TV: CBS
- Box Score/Recap

Game information

First quarter

- UGA – Robert Edwards 27-yard run (Hap Hines kick), 10:16. Georgia 7–0.

Second quarter

- UF – Collins Cooper 36-yard field goal, 6:03. Georgia 7–3.
- UGA – Robert Edwards 1-yard run (Hap Hines kick), 3:23. Georgia 14–3.

Third quarter

- UF – Noah Brindise 1-yard run (Collins Cooper kick), 11:23. Georgia 14–10.
- UF – Rod Frazier 3-yard run (Collins Cooper kick), 6:32. Florida 17–14.
- UGA – Robert Edwards 1-yard run (Hap Hines kick), 1:30. Georgia 21–17.

Fourth quarter

- UGA – Dax Langley 27-yard field goal, 9:02. Georgia 24–17.
- UGA – Robert Edwards 37-yard run (kick failed), 5:58. Georgia 30–17.
- UGA – Olandis Gary 7-yard run (Hap Hines kick), 2:44. Georgia 37–17.

Top passers

- UGA – Mike Bobo – 16/27, 260 yards, 3 INT
- UF – Doug Johnson – 12/25, 115 yards, 2 INT

Top rushers

- UGA – Robert Edwards – 26 rushes, 124 yards, 4 TD
- UF – Fred Taylor – 18 rushes, 85 yards

Top receivers

- UGA – Corey Allen – 5 receptions, 116 yards
- UF – Jamie Richardson – 6 receptions, 97 yards

First loss to Georgia since 1989.

=== Florida State ===
#1 Florida State Seminoles at #10 Florida Gators

| Quarter | 1 | 2 | 3 | 4 | Total |
|---|---|---|---|---|---|
| Florida St | 10 | 7 | 9 | 3 | 29 |
| Florida | 6 | 12 | 7 | 7 | 32 |

at Ben Hill Griffith Stadium • Gainesville, Florida

- Date: November 22
- Game attendance: 85,677
- USA Today

Florida ended the regular season with a 32–29 upset of top-ranked FSU known as the "greatest game ever played in the Swamp." The Seminoles were driving late in the fourth quarter when the Gator defense stopped them at the 5-yard line, and they settled for a Sebastian Janikowski field goal for a 29–25 lead. On first down of the next drive, quarterback Doug Johnson passed to consensus All-American receiver Jacquez Green from the Gator 20-yeard line for a 62-yard gain. Running back Fred Taylor completed the drive with a touchdown, and Florida took the lead for good 32–29. FSU's final comeback attempt was stymied when senior linebacker Dwayne Thomas intercepted a third-down pass from Thad Busby, costing the Seminoles a chance at the national championship.

Scoring summary

| Quarter | Time | Drive | | | Team | Scoring information | Score | |
| Quarter | Time | Plays | Yards | TOP | Team | Scoring information | FSU | FLA |
|---|---|---|---|---|---|---|---|---|
| 1 | 10:45 | | | | Florida | Fred Taylor 3-yard touchdown run, Collins Cooper kick no good | 0 | 6 |
| 1 | 4:32 | | | | Florida St | Fumble recovery returned 15 yards for touchdown by Sam Cowart, Sebastian Janikowski kick good | 7 | 6 |
| 1 | 1:51 | | | | Florida St | 28-yard field goal by Sebastian Janikowski | 10 | 6 |
| 2 | 6:49 | | | | Florida St | Melvin Pearsall 5-yard touchdown reception from Thad Busby, Sebastian Janikowski kick good | 17 | 6 |
| 2 | 7:10 | | | | Florida | Travis McGriff 6-yard touchdown reception from Doug Johnson, 2-point pass failed | 17 | 12 |
| 2 | 4:13 | | | | Florida | Fred Taylor 4-yard touchdown run, 2-point pass failed | 17 | 18 |
| 3 | 10:32 | | | | Florida St | 31-yard field goal by Sebastian Janikowski | 20 | 18 |
| 3 | 9:25 | | | | Florida | Fred Taylor 61-yard touchdown run, Collins Cooper kick good | 20 | 25 |
| 3 | 5:24 | 8 | 74 | | Florida St | Travis Minor 18-yard touchdown run, 2-point pass incomplete | 26 | 25 |
| 4 | 2:38 | | | | Florida St | 20-yard field goal by Sebastian Janikowski | 29 | 25 |
| 4 | 1:50 | 3 | 80 | | Florida | Fred Taylor 1-yard touchdown run, Collins Cooper kick good | 29 | 32 |
| "TOP" = time of possession. For other American football terms, see Glossary of American football. | | | | | | | 29 | 32 |

== Roster ==
1997 Florida Gators football team roster
Players
Coaches
Offense

| Pos. | # | Name | Class |
|---|---|---|---|
| RB | | Ian Alestock |
| OL | | Cheston Blackshear |
| QB | | Noah Brindise |
| RB | | Bo Carroll |
| OL | | Mo Collins |
| TE | | Dwight Edge |
| FB | | Rod Frazier |
| WR | 5 | Jacquez Green | Jr |
| WR | | Darrell Jackson |
| RB | | Terry Jackson |
| TE | | Erron Kinney |
| RB | | Eugene McCaslin |
| QB | 7 | Jesse Palmer | Fr |
| QB | 12 | Doug Johnson | So |
| OL | | Ryan Kalich |
| WR | | Nafis Karim |
| WR | 3 | Travis McGriff | Jr |
| OL | | Zach Piller |
| WR | | Jamie Richardson |
| QB | | Larry Richart |
| OL | | Wyley Ritch |
| TE | | Taras Ross |
| WR | | Ian Skinner |
| RB | 21 | Fred Taylor | Sr |
| WR | | Travis Taylor |

Defense

| Pos. | # | Name | Class |
|---|---|---|---|
| DL | | Tim Beauchamp |
| DB | | Teako Brown |
| DL | | Ed Chester |
| DL | | Willie Cohens |
| CB | 1 | Tony George | Jr |
| DB | | Ron Graddy |
| DL | | Jevon Kearse |
| LB | | Keith Kelsey |
| DL | | Reggie McGrew |
| DL | | Mike Moten |
| LB | | Mike Peterson |
| DL | | Willie Rodgers |
| LB | | Johnny Rutledge |
| LB | | Dwayne Thomas |
| CB | 24 | Fred Weary | Sr |
| DB | | Elijah Williams |

Special teams

| Pos. | # | Name | Class |
|---|---|---|---|
| K | | Jeff Chandler |
| K | 95 | Collins Cooper |
| P | | Josh Korn |
| P | | Robby Stevenson |

Head coach

- Steve Spurrier

Coordinators/assistant coaches

- Bob Stoops
- Rod Broadway
  Defensive line
- Carl Franks
  Offensive coordinator/Running backs
- Sammy McCorkle
  Graduate assistant

Legend

- (C) Team captain
- (S) Suspended
- (I) Ineligible
- Injured
- Redshirt
