= 1997 Mississippi State Bulldogs football team =

American college football season

1997 Mississippi State Bulldogs football
- Conference: Southeastern Conference
- Western Division
- Record: 7–4 (4–4 SEC)
- Head coach: Jackie Sherrill (7th season)
- Offensive coordinator: Lynn Amedee (2nd season)
- Offensive scheme: Multiple
- Defensive coordinator: Joe Lee Dunn (2nd season)
- Base defense: 3–3–5
- Home stadium: Scott Field

1997 Southeastern Conference football standings
	Conf.			Overall
Team	W		L	W		L
Eastern Division
No. 7 Tennessee x$	7	–	1	11	–	2
No. 10 Georgia	6	–	2	10	–	2
No. 4 Florida	6	–	2	10	–	2
South Carolina	3	–	5	5	–	6
Kentucky	2	–	6	5	–	6
Vanderbilt	0	–	8	3	–	8
Western Division
No. 11 Auburn xy	6	–	2	10	–	3
No. 13 LSU x	6	–	2	9	–	3
No. 22 Ole Miss	4	–	4	8	–	4
Mississippi State	4	–	4	7	–	4
Arkansas	2	–	6	4	–	7
Alabama	2	–	6	4	–	7
Championship: Tennessee 30, Auburn 29
$ – Conference champion; x – Division champion/co-champions; Rankings from AP Poll

The 1997 Mississippi State Bulldogs football team represented Mississippi State University as a member of the Western Division of the Southern Conference (SEC) during the 1997 NCAA Division I-A football season. Led by seventh-year head coach Jackie Sherrill, the Bulldogs compiled an overall record of 7–4 with a mark of 4–4 in conference play, tying for third place in the SEC's Western Division. Mississippi State played home games at Scott Field in Starkville, Mississippi.

As of 2025, the 1997 Bulldogs are the last SEC team with seven or more wins and not ineligible for a bowl due to NCAA sanctions not to be invited to a bowl game.

== Schedule ==
Date	Time	Opponent	Rank	Site	TV	Result	Attendance	Source
August 30	6:00 p.m.	Memphis*		Scott Field; Starkville, MS	FSN	W 13–10	33,310	
September 6	11:30 a.m.	Kentucky		Scott Field; Starkville, MS	JPS	W 35–27	30,121	
September 13	8:00 p.m.	No. 10 LSU		Scott Field; Starkville, MS (rivalry)	ESPN	L 9–24	40,030	
September 27	11:30 a.m.	South Carolina		Scott Field; Starkville, MS	JPS	W 37–17	30,120	
October 4	12:00 p.m.	at No. 18 Georgia		Sanford Stadium; Athens, GA		L 0–47	83,211	
October 11	6:00 p.m.	Northeast Louisiana*		Scott Field; Starkville, MS		W 24–10	30,857	
October 25	1:30 p.m.	UCF*^{†}		Scott Field; Starkville, MS		W 35–28	28,621	
November 1	1:00 p.m.	at No. 11 Auburn		Jordan-Hare Stadium; Auburn, AL		W 20–0	82,736	
November 15	11:30 a.m.	at Alabama	No. 17	Bryant–Denny Stadium; Tuscaloosa, AL (rivalry)	JPS	W 32–20	70,123	
November 22	1:00 p.m.	at Arkansas	No. 15	Razorback Stadium; Fayetteville, AR		L 7–17	39,911	
November 29	2:30 p.m.	Ole Miss	No. 22	Scott Field; Starkville, MS (Egg Bowl)	JPS	L 14–15	41,200	
*Non-conference game; ^{†}Homecoming; Rankings from AP Poll released prior to the game; All times are in Central time
