= 1997 South Carolina Gamecocks football team =

American college football season

1997 South Carolina Gamecocks football
- Conference: Southeastern Conference
- Eastern Division
- Record: 5–6 (3–5 SEC)
- Head coach: Brad Scott (4th season)
- Offensive coordinator: John Eason (3rd season)
- Defensive coordinator: Wally Burnham (4th season)
- Base defense: 4–3
- Home stadium: Williams–Brice Stadium

1997 Southeastern Conference football standings
	Conf.			Overall
Team	W		L	W		L
Eastern Division
No. 7 Tennessee x$	7	–	1	11	–	2
No. 10 Georgia	6	–	2	10	–	2
No. 4 Florida	6	–	2	10	–	2
South Carolina	3	–	5	5	–	6
Kentucky	2	–	6	5	–	6
Vanderbilt	0	–	8	3	–	8
Western Division
No. 11 Auburn xy	6	–	2	10	–	3
No. 13 LSU x	6	–	2	9	–	3
No. 22 Ole Miss	4	–	4	8	–	4
Mississippi State	4	–	4	7	–	4
Arkansas	2	–	6	4	–	7
Alabama	2	–	6	4	–	7
Championship: Tennessee 30, Auburn 29
$ – Conference champion; x – Division champion/co-champions; Rankings from AP Poll

The 1997 South Carolina Gamecocks football team represented the University of South Carolina as a member of the Eastern Division of the Southeastern Conference (SEC) during the 1997 NCAA Division I-A football season. Led by fourth-year head coach Brad Scott, the Gamecocks compiled an overall record of 5–6 with a mark of 3–5 in conference play, placing fourth in the SEC's Eastern Division. The team played home games at Williams–Brice Stadium in Columbia, South Carolina.

This was the first of three consecutive losing seasons for South Carolina ending the 1990s.

== Schedule ==
Date	Time	Opponent	Site	TV	Result	Attendance	Source
September 6	7:00 p.m.	UCF*	Williams–Brice Stadium; Columbia, SC	FSS	W 33–31	81,908	
September 13	3:30 p.m.	at No. 25 Georgia	Sanford Stadium; Athens, GA (rivalry)	CBS	L 15–31	86,117	
September 20	3:00 p.m.	at East Carolina*	Dowdy–Ficklen Stadium; Greenville, NC	FSS	W 26–0	38,902	
September 27	12:30 p.m.	at Mississippi State	Scott Field; Starkville, MS	JPS	L 17–37	30,120	
October 4	12:30 p.m.	No. 9 Auburn	Williams–Brice Stadium; Columbia, SC	JPS	L 6–23	79,411	
October 11	12:30 p.m.	Kentucky	Williams–Brice Stadium; Columbia, SC	JPS	W 38–24	75,936	
October 18	7:00 p.m.	at Arkansas	War Memorial Stadium; Little Rock, AR		W 39–13	49,178	
October 25	7:00 p.m.	Vanderbilt	Williams–Brice Stadium; Columbia, SC		W 35–3	79,014	
November 1	12:30 p.m.	at No. 8 Tennessee	Neyland Stadium; Knoxville, TN (rivalry)	JPS	L 7–22	106,301	
November 15	12:30 p.m.	No. 12 Florida	Williams–Brice Stadium; Columbia, SC	JPS	L 21–48	80,072	
November 22	6:00 p.m.	Clemson*	Williams–Brice Stadium; Columbia, SC (rivalry)	ESPN2	L 21–47	83,700	
*Non-conference game; Rankings from Coaches' Poll released prior to the game; All times are in Eastern time

.

== Roster ==
1997 South Carolina Gamecocks football team roster
Players
Coaches
Offense 74 Kevin Rolack OL 6-3 302 Jr. HS Saint George, S.C. (St.George) 78 Travis Whitfield OG 6-4 293 Sr./RS 3VL Honea-Path, S.C. (Belton-Honea Path)

Pos.	#	Name	Class
QB	1	Anthony Wright	Jr
RB	4	Boo Williams	So
WR	8	Ben Fleming	So
WR	9	Kerry Hood	So
WR	10	Carlos Spikes	Fr
FB	11	Jacob Bush	So
QB	14	Phil Petty	Fr
QB	16	Joey Unitas	Sr
QB	17	Victor Penn	Fr
QB	18	Kevin Sides	Jr
RB	19	Troy Hambrick	So
WR	21	Zola Davis	Jr
RB	22	Ryght Jordan	Fr
C	53	Paul Beckwith	Sr
G	63	Ed Hrubiec	Sr
OL	64	Taylor Irvin	Fr
OL	65	Philip Jones	Fr
OL	67	Jesse Washington	Sr
OT	68	Reggie Baker	Sr
OL	69	Todd Davis	Fr
OT	70	Andray Spearman	Jr
OL	71	Kevin Rivers	Fr
OL	72	Melvin Paige	Fr
OL	75	Adam Buckley	Fr
OL	77	Jim Pietrzak	Fr
OT	79	Jamar Nesbit	Jr
WR	80	Donovan Norman	So
TE	81	Rod Trafford	Fr
WR	82	Calvin Owens	Sr
WR	83	Tyrance Williams	Fr
WR	84	Jermale Kelly	Fr
WR	85	Shah Mays	Jr
TE	86	Trevon Matthews	So
WR		Jon-Eric Sullivan

Defense 57 Errol Rochester LB 6-0 245 So./RS 1VL Miami Springs, Fla. (Miami Springs)

Pos.	#	Name	Class
DB	3	Ray Green	So
CB	5	Kevin Brooks	Jr
SS	6	Ben Washington	Sr
FS	12	Arturo Freeman	Jr
DB	20	Willie Offord	Fr
LB	42	Darren Hambrick	Sr
DE	55	Selvesta Miller	Sr
LB	58	Corey Atkins	So
LB	45	James McDougald	Sr
DT	90	Henry Taylor	Sr
DL	91	John Stamper	Fr
LB	92	Ryan Koop	Sr
DT	93	Michael Maddox	Sr
DE	94	Matt Marsters	So
DE	95	John Abraham	So
DT	96	Cecil Caldwell	So
DT	97	Trey Pennington	So
DT	98	Rachad Wilson	Jr
DE	99	Anthony Overstreet	Fr

Special teams

Pos.	#	Name	Class
P/K	7	Courtney Leavitt	So
K	15	Steve Florio	Jr

Head coach

- Brad Scott

Coordinators/assistant coaches

- Oliver Pough
  (Running backs coach)

Legend

- (C) Team captain
- (S) Suspended
- (I) Ineligible
- Injured
- Redshirt

Roster
Last update: 1998-01-28
