= 1997 Georgia Bulldogs football team =

American college football season

1997 Georgia Bulldogs football

Outback Bowl champion

Outback Bowl, W 33–6 vs. Wisconsin
- Conference: Southeastern Conference
- Eastern Division

Ranking
- Coaches: No. 10
- AP: No. 10
- Record: 10–2 (6–2 SEC)
- Head coach: Jim Donnan (2nd season)
- Offensive coordinator: Greg Briner (2nd season)
- Offensive scheme: Pro-style
- Defensive coordinator: Joe Kines (3rd season)
- Base defense: 4–3
- Home stadium: Sanford Stadium

1997 Southeastern Conference football standings
| | Conf. | | | Overall |
| Team | W | | L | W | | L |
|---|---|---|---|---|---|---|
Eastern Division
| No. 7 Tennessee x$ | 7 | – | 1 | 11 | – | 2 |
| No. 10 Georgia | 6 | – | 2 | 10 | – | 2 |
| No. 4 Florida | 6 | – | 2 | 10 | – | 2 |
| South Carolina | 3 | – | 5 | 5 | – | 6 |
| Kentucky | 2 | – | 6 | 5 | – | 6 |
| Vanderbilt | 0 | – | 8 | 3 | – | 8 |
Western Division
| No. 11 Auburn xy | 6 | – | 2 | 10 | – | 3 |
| No. 13 LSU x | 6 | – | 2 | 9 | – | 3 |
| No. 22 Ole Miss | 4 | – | 4 | 8 | – | 4 |
| Mississippi State | 4 | – | 4 | 7 | – | 4 |
| Arkansas | 2 | – | 6 | 4 | – | 7 |
| Alabama | 2 | – | 6 | 4 | – | 7 |
Championship: Tennessee 30, Auburn 29
$ – Conference champion; x – Division champion/co-champions; Rankings from AP Poll

The 1997 Georgia Bulldogs football team was an American football team that represented the University of Georgia as a member of the Eastern Division of the Southeastern Conference during the 1997 NCAA Division I-A football season. In their second year under head coach Jim Donnan, the Bulldogs compiled an overall record of 10–2 with a mark of 6–2 in conference play, and tying for second place in the SEC's Eastern Division. Georgia was invited to the Outback Bowl, where the Bulldogs defeated Wisconsin. The team played home games at Sanford Stadium in Athens, Georgia.

== Schedule ==
| Date | Time | Opponent | Rank | Site | TV | Result | Attendance | Source |
|---|---|---|---|---|---|---|---|---|
| August 30 | 1:00 p.m. | Arkansas State* | | Sanford Stadium; Athens, GA | | W 38–7 | 79,145 | |
| September 13 | 3:30 p.m. | South Carolina | | Sanford Stadium; Athens, GA (rivalry) | CBS | W 31–15 | 86,117 | |
| September 20 | 1:00 p.m. | Northeast Louisiana* | No. 25 | Sanford Stadium; Athens, GA | | W 42–3 | 74,113 | |
| October 4 | 1:00 p.m. | Mississippi State | No. 18 | Sanford Stadium; Athens, GA | | W 47–0 | 83,211 | |
| October 11 | 3:30 p.m. | at No. 9 Tennessee | No. 13 | Neyland Stadium; Knoxville, TN (rivalry) | CBS | L 13–38 | 106,656 | |
| October 18 | 9:00 p.m. | at Vanderbilt | No. 19 | Vanderbilt Stadium; Nashville, TN (rivalry) | ESPN2 | W 34–13 | 35,124 | |
| October 25 | 3:30 p.m. | Kentucky^{†} | No. 16 | Sanford Stadium; Athens, GA | CBS | W 23–13 | 85,672 | |
| November 1 | 3:30 p.m. | vs. No. 6 Florida | No. 14 | Alltel Stadium; Jacksonville, FL (rivalry) | CBS | W 37–17 | 84,297 | |
| November 15 | 5:30 p.m. | No. 16 Auburn | No. 7 | Sanford Stadium; Athens, GA (Deep South's Oldest Rivalry) | ESPN | L 34–45 | 86,117 | |
| November 22 | 2:00 p.m. | at Ole Miss | No. 14 | Vaught–Hemingway Stadium; Oxford, MS | | W 21–14 | 35,473 | |
| November 29 | 1:00 p.m. | at Georgia Tech* | No. 14 | Bobby Dodd Stadium; Atlanta, GA (Clean, Old-Fashioned Hate) | ABC | W 27–24 | 46,015 | |
| January 1, 1998 | 11:00 a.m. | vs. Wisconsin* | No. 12 | Houlihan's Stadium; Tampa, FL (Outback Bowl) | ESPN | W 33–6 | 56,186 | |
*Non-conference game; ^{†}Homecoming; Rankings from AP Poll released prior to the game; All times are in Eastern time

== Rankings ==
Ranking movements Legend: ██ Increase in ranking ██ Decrease in ranking — = Not ranked
| | Week | | | | | | | | | | | | | | | | | |
| Poll | Pre | 1 | 2 | 3 | 4 | 5 | 6 | 7 | 8 | 9 | 10 | 11 | 12 | 13 | 14 | 15 | 16 | Final |
|---|---|---|---|---|---|---|---|---|---|---|---|---|---|---|---|---|---|---|
| AP | — | — | — | — | 25 | 19 | 18 | 13 | 19 | 16 | 14 | 9 | 7 | 14 | 14 | 13 | 12 | 11 |
| Coaches | — | | — | — | 25 | 20 | 19 | 15 | 21 | 18 | 15 | 9 | 7 | 14 | 14 | 13 | 11 | 10 |

== Game summaries ==
=== Vs. Florida ===
#6 Florida Gators (6–1) vs. #17 Georgia Bulldogs (6–1)

| Quarter | 1 | 2 | 3 | 4 | Total |
|---|---|---|---|---|---|
| Georgia | 7 | 7 | 7 | 16 | 37 |
| Florida | 0 | 3 | 14 | 0 | 17 |

at Alltel Stadium, Jacksonville, Florida

- Date: November 1
- Game attendance: 84,297
- TV: CBS
- Box Score/Recap

Game information

First quarter

- UGA – Robert Edwards 27-yard run (Hap Hines kick), 10:16. Georgia 7–0.

Second quarter

- UF – Collins Cooper 36-yard field goal, 6:03. Georgia 7–3.
- UGA – Robert Edwards 1-yard run (Hap Hines kick), 3:23. Georgia 14–3.

Third quarter

- UF – Noah Brindise 1-yard run (Collins Cooper kick), 11:23. Georgia 14–10.
- UF – Rod Frazier 3-yard run (Collins Cooper kick), 6:32. Florida 17–14.
- UGA – Robert Edwards 1-yard run (Hap Hines kick), 1:30. Georgia 21–17.

Fourth quarter

- UGA – Dax Langley 27-yard field goal, 9:02. Georgia 24–17.
- UGA – Robert Edwards 37-yard run (kick failed), 5:58. Georgia 30–17.
- UGA – Olandis Gary 7-yard run (Hap Hines kick), 2:44. Georgia 37–17.

Top passers

- UGA – Mike Bobo – 16/27, 260 yards, 3 INT
- UF – Doug Johnson – 12/25, 115 yards, 2 INT

Top rushers

- UGA – Robert Edwards – 26 rushes, 124 yards, 4 TD
- UF – Fred Taylor – 18 rushes, 85 yards

Top receivers

- UGA – Corey Allen – 5 receptions, 116 yards
- UF – Jamie Richardson – 6 receptions, 97 yards

== Personnel ==
1997 Georgia Bulldogs football team roster
Players
Coaches
Offense

| Pos. | # | Name | Class |
|---|---|---|---|
| WR | | Corey Allen |
| RB | | Robert Arnaud |
| QB | | Mike Bobo | Sr |
| RB | | Ronnie Bradley |
| TE | | Larry Brown |
| RB | | Selma Calloway |
| WR | | Andrew Cronic |
| RB | | Robert Edwards |
| QB | | Jon England |
| OL | | Antonio Fleming |
| RB | | Olandis Gary |
| WR | | Michael Greer |
| OL | | Steve Herndon |
| OL | | Kenley Ingram |
| OL | 75 | Jonas Jennings | Fr |
| OL | | Miles Luckie |
| RB | | Brett Millican |
| WR | | Thad Parker |
| RB | | Patrick Pass |
| WR | | Tony Small |
| OL | | Brad Stafford |
| OL | | Matt Stinchcomb |
| OL | | Chris Terry |
| QB | | Mike Usry |
| WR | | Hines Ward | Sr |
| TE | | Jermaine Wiggins |
| OL | | Kelvin Williams |

Defense

| Pos. | # | Name | Class |
|---|---|---|---|
| CB, WR | 4 | Champ Bailey |
| CB | 5 | Ronald Bailey |
| LB | | Greg Bright |
| DB | | Derrick Byrd |
| DB | | Earl Chambers |
| DL | | Antonio Cochran |
| DB | | Glenn Ford |
| DB | | Drantes Grant |
| DB | | Dustin Luckie |
| LB | | Mike Luckie |
| DB | | Larry Mann |
| DL | | Brandon Miller |
| DL | | Richard Seymour |
| DB | | Trey Sipe |
| DB | | Kirby Smart |
| DL | | Paul Snellings |
| DL | | Travis Stroud |
| LB | | Brandon Tolbert |

Special teams

| Pos. | # | Name | Class |
|---|---|---|---|
| K | | Hap Hines | So |
| P, K | | Dax Langley |

Head coach

- Jim Donnan

Coordinators/assistant coaches

- Phil Jones (graduate assistant)

Legend

- (C) Team captain
- (S) Suspended
- (I) Ineligible
- Injured
- Redshirt
