= 1997 Arkansas Razorbacks football team =

American college football season

1997 Arkansas Razorbacks football
- Conference: Southeastern Conference
- Western Division
- Record: 4–7 (2–6 SEC)
- Head coach: Danny Ford (5th season)
- Offensive coordinator: Kay Stephenson (1st season)
- Offensive scheme: 2 back
- Defensive coordinator: Miles Aldridge (2nd season)
- Base defense: 5–2
- Captains: Ken Anderson; Anthony Eubanks
- Home stadium: Razorback Stadium; War Memorial Stadium

1997 Southeastern Conference football standings
	Conf.			Overall
Team	W		L	W		L
Eastern Division
No. 7 Tennessee x$	7	–	1	11	–	2
No. 10 Georgia	6	–	2	10	–	2
No. 4 Florida	6	–	2	10	–	2
South Carolina	3	–	5	5	–	6
Kentucky	2	–	6	5	–	6
Vanderbilt	0	–	8	3	–	8
Western Division
No. 11 Auburn xy	6	–	2	10	–	3
No. 13 LSU x	6	–	2	9	–	3
No. 22 Ole Miss	4	–	4	8	–	4
Mississippi State	4	–	4	7	–	4
Arkansas	2	–	6	4	–	7
Alabama	2	–	6	4	–	7
Championship: Tennessee 30, Auburn 29
$ – Conference champion; x – Division champion/co-champions; Rankings from AP Poll

The 1997 Arkansas Razorbacks football team was an American football team that represented the University of Arkansas as a member of the Western Division of the Southeastern Conference during the 1997 NCAA Division I-A football season. In their fifth and final year under head coach Danny Ford, the team compiled a 4–7 record, with a conference record of 2–6, and finished fifth in the Western Division (ahead of Alabama based upon a 17-16 victory at Tuscaloosa).

The day after a season ending loss to rival LSU, Ford was fired by athletic director Frank Broyles following four non-winning seasons out of five and a 25-31-1 overall worksheet. Houston Nutt, then the head coach at Boise State, as well as a former Razorback player and assistant coach, succeeded Ford.

== Schedule ==
Date	Time	Opponent	Site	TV	Result	Attendance	Source
September 6	6:00 p.m.	Northeast Louisiana*	Razorback Stadium; Fayetteville AR		W 28–16	45,832	
September 13	7:00 p.m.	vs. SMU*	Independence Stadium; Shreveport, LA		L 9–31	23,500	
September 20	11:30 a.m.	at No. 11 Alabama	Bryant–Denny Stadium; Tuscaloosa, AL	JPS	W 17–16	70,123	
September 27	5:00 p.m.	Louisiana Tech*	War Memorial Stadium; Little Rock, AR		W 17–13	51,291	
October 4	5:00 p.m.	at No. 1 Florida	Ben Hill Griffin Stadium; Gainesville, FL	ESPN2	L 7–56	85,235	
October 18	6:00 p.m.	South Carolina	War Memorial Stadium; Little Rock, AR		L 13–39	49,178	
October 25	5:00 p.m.	No. 11 Auburn	Razorback Stadium; Fayetteville, AR	ESPN2	L 21–26	41,277	
November 6	7:00 p.m.	at Ole Miss	Vaught–Hemingway Stadium; Oxford, MS (rivalry)	ESPN	L 9–19	30,620	
November 15	7:00 p.m.	No. 5 Tennessee	War Memorial Stadium; Little Rock, AR	ESPN2	L 22–30	53,235	
November 22	1:00 p.m.	No. 15 Mississippi State	Razorback Stadium; Fayetteville, AR		W 17–7	39,911	
November 28	1:30 p.m.	at No. 17 LSU	Tiger Stadium; Baton Rouge, LA (rivalry)	CBS	L 21–31	79,619	
*Non-conference game; Rankings from AP Poll released prior to the game; All times are in Central time
