= 1997 Ole Miss Rebels football team =

American college football season

1997 Ole Miss Rebels football

Motor City Bowl champion

Motor City Bowl, W 34–31 vs. Marshall
- Conference: Southeastern Conference
- Western Division

Ranking
- Coaches: No. 22
- AP: No. 22
- Record: 8–4 (4–4 SEC)
- Head coach: Tommy Tuberville (3rd season)
- Offensive coordinator: Noel Mazzone (3rd season)
- Offensive scheme: Pro-style
- Defensive coordinator: Art Kaufman (3rd season)
- Base defense: 4–3
- Home stadium: Vaught–Hemingway Stadium

1997 Southeastern Conference football standings
	Conf.			Overall
Team	W		L	W		L
Eastern Division
No. 7 Tennessee x$	7	–	1	11	–	2
No. 10 Georgia	6	–	2	10	–	2
No. 4 Florida	6	–	2	10	–	2
South Carolina	3	–	5	5	–	6
Kentucky	2	–	6	5	–	6
Vanderbilt	0	–	8	3	–	8
Western Division
No. 11 Auburn xy	6	–	2	10	–	3
No. 13 LSU x	6	–	2	9	–	3
No. 22 Ole Miss	4	–	4	8	–	4
Mississippi State	4	–	4	7	–	4
Arkansas	2	–	6	4	–	7
Alabama	2	–	6	4	–	7
Championship: Tennessee 30, Auburn 29
$ – Conference champion; x – Division champion/co-champions; Rankings from AP Poll

The 1997 Ole Miss Rebels football team represented the University of Mississippi during the 1997 NCAA Division I-A football season. They participated as members of the Southeastern Conference in the West Division. Coached by Tommy Tuberville, the Rebels played all of their home games at Vaught–Hemingway Stadium in Oxford, Mississippi for the first time in school history.

== Schedule ==
Date	Opponent	Rank	Site	TV	Result	Attendance	Source
August 30	UCF*		Vaught–Hemingway Stadium; Oxford, MS		W 24–23 ^{OT}	28,216	
September 6	SMU*		Vaught–Hemingway Stadium; Oxford, MS		W 23–15	36,521	
September 13	at No. 16 Auburn		Jordan-Hare Stadium; Auburn, AL (rivalry)	JPS	L 9–19	81,203	
September 27	Vanderbilt^{†}		Vaught–Hemingway Stadium; Oxford, MS (rivalry)		W 15–3	36,417	
October 4	at No. 10 Tennessee		Neyland Stadium; Knoxville, TN (rivalry)	CBS	L 17–31	106,229	
October 18	at No. 8 LSU		Tiger Stadium; Baton Rouge, LA (rivalry)	JPS	W 36–21	80,442	
October 25	Alabama	No. 25	Vaught–Hemingway Stadium; Oxford, MS (rivalry)	JPS	L 20–29	41,548	
November 6	Arkansas		Vaught–Hemingway Stadium; Oxford, MS (rivalry)	ESPN	W 19–9	30,620	
November 15	at Tulane*		Louisiana Superdome; New Orleans, LA (rivalry)		W 41–24	35,607	
November 22	No. 14 Georgia		Vaught–Hemingway Stadium; Oxford, MS		L 14–21	35,473	
November 29	at No. 22 Mississippi State		Scott Field; Starkville, MS (Egg Bowl)	JPS	W 15–14	41,200	
December 26	vs. Marshall*		Pontiac Silverdome; Pontiac, MI (Motor City Bowl)	ESPN	W 34–31	43,340	
*Non-conference game; ^{†}Homecoming; Rankings from AP Poll released prior to the game

== Rankings ==
Ranking movements Legend: ██ Increase in ranking ██ Decrease in ranking — = Not ranked
	Week																	
Poll	Pre	1	2	3	4	5	6	7	8	9	10	11	12	13	14	15	16	Final
AP	—	—	—	—	—	—	—	—	25	—	—	—	—	—	—	—	—	22
Coaches	—		—	—	—	—	—	—	—	—	—	—	—	—	—	—	—	22

== Roster ==
1997 Ole Miss Rebels football team roster
Players
Coaches
Offense

Pos.	#	Name	Class
RB	17	Alishma Alexander	Jr
FB	7	Eli Anding	Sr
WR	87	Jamie Armstrong	Jr
TB	20	John Avery	Sr
RB	22	Deuce McAllister	Fr
OL	72	John McGarvey	Fr
OL	79	Terrence Metcalf	Fr
C	68	Cooper Miles	Fr
QB	11	Romero Miller	Fr
WR	86	Sheldon Morris	Jr
OL	76	Tutan Reyes	So
OL	73	Keydrick Vincent	Fr
OL	71	Todd Wade	So

Defense

Pos.	#	Name	Class
DT	56	Derrick Burgess	Fr
DE	41	Quincy Washington	So
LB	38	Nate Wayne	Sr
LB	55	Matt Wells	Sr
LB	46	Amzie Williams	Fr

Special teams

Pos.	#	Name	Class

Head coach

- Tommy Tuberville

Coordinators/assistant coaches

Legend

- (C) Team captain
- (S) Suspended
- (I) Ineligible
- Injured
- Redshirt

Roster
Last update: 1998-12-02

== Game summaries ==
=== Vs. Marshall (Motor City Bowl) ===
Team	1	2	3	4	Total
• Rebels	7	0	14	13	34
Thundering Herd	10	7	0	14	31

- Date: December 26
- Location:
  Pontiac Silverdome
  Pontiac, MI
- Game attendance: 43,430
- TV announcers (ESPN): Jerry Punch and Mike Gottfried

Scoring summary
1	14:36	MISS	John Avery 1-yard run (Steve Lindsey kick)	MISS 7–0
1	14:19	MAR	Randy Moss 80-yard pass from Chad Pennington (Billy Malashevich kick)	Tied 7–7
1		MAR	Billy Malashevich field goal	MAR 10–7
2		MAR	LaVorn Colclough pass from Chad Pennington (Bill Malashevich kick)	MAR 17–7
3		MISS	Andre Rone pass from Stewart Patridge (Steve Lindsey kick)	MAR 17–14
3		MISS	Deuce McAllister 20-yard pass from Stewart Patridge (Steve Lindsey kick)	MISS 21–17
4	10:12	MAR	Doug Chapman 6-yard pass from Chad Pennington (Billy Malashevich kick)	MAR 24–21
4	5:39	MISS	Grant Heard 19-yard pass from Stewart Patridge (kick failed)	MISS 27–24
4	2:57	MAR	Doug Chapman 9-yard run (Billy Malashevich kick)	MAR 31–27
4	0:31	MISS	Deuce McAllister 1-yard run (Steve Lindsey kick)	MISS 34–31
