= Shamari Buchanan =

American football player (born 1977)

Profile
- Position: Wide receiver

Personal information
- Born: January 11, 1977 (age 48)

Career information
- College: Alabama

Shamari Buchanan (born January 11, 1977) is an American football wide receiver. He played college football for the University of Alabama. and won a SEC Championship his senior year with the Alabama Crimson Tide. Professionally, he signed with and was a member of the 2000 Oakland Raiders, In 2002, he played for the Toronto Phantoms of the Arena Football League, The Wichita Stealth of af2 in 2003, and the Corpus Christi Hammerheads of the Intense Football League from 2004-2006.
