= 1997 Tennessee Volunteers football team =

American college football season

1997 Tennessee Volunteers football

SEC champion SEC Eastern Division champion

SEC Championship Game, W 30–29 vs. Auburn

Orange Bowl (BA NCG), L 17–42 vs. Nebraska
- Conference: Southeastern Conference
- Eastern Division

Ranking
- Coaches: No. 8
- AP: No. 7
- Record: 11–2 (7–1 SEC)
- Head coach: Phillip Fulmer (5th season)
- Offensive coordinator: David Cutcliffe (5th season)
- Offensive scheme: Pro-style
- Defensive coordinator: John Chavis (3rd season)
- Base defense: Multiple 4–3
- Captains: Leonard Little; Peyton Manning
- Home stadium: Neyland Stadium

1997 Southeastern Conference football standings
	Conf.			Overall
Team	W		L	W		L
Eastern Division
No. 7 Tennessee x$	7	–	1	11	–	2
No. 10 Georgia	6	–	2	10	–	2
No. 4 Florida	6	–	2	10	–	2
South Carolina	3	–	5	5	–	6
Kentucky	2	–	6	5	–	6
Vanderbilt	0	–	8	3	–	8
Western Division
No. 11 Auburn xy	6	–	2	10	–	3
No. 13 LSU x	6	–	2	9	–	3
No. 22 Ole Miss	4	–	4	8	–	4
Mississippi State	4	–	4	7	–	4
Arkansas	2	–	6	4	–	7
Alabama	2	–	6	4	–	7
Championship: Tennessee 30, Auburn 29
$ – Conference champion; x – Division champion/co-champions; Rankings from AP Poll

The 1997 Tennessee Volunteers football team represented the University of Tennessee as a member of the Eastern Division of the Southeastern Conference (SEC) during the 1997 NCAA Division I-A football season. Led by fifth-year head coach Phillip Fulmer, the Volunteers compiled an overall record of 11–2 with a mark of 7–1, winning the SEC's Eastern Division title. Tennessee advanced to the SEC Championship Game, where the Volunteers defeated Auburn to capture the conference championship. Tennessee was then invited to the Orange Bowl, which served as the Bowl Alliance's national title game. There the Volunteers lost to Nebraska. The team played home games at Neyland Stadium in Knoxville, Tennessee.

Quarterback Peyton Manning had already completed his degree in three years and had been projected to be the top overall pick in the 1997 NFL draft, but he returned to Tennessee for his senior year. The Volunteers opened the season with victories against Texas Tech and UCLA, but for the third time in his career, Manning fell to Florida, 33–20. The Vols won the rest of their regular season games, finishing 10–1, and advanced to the SEC Championship Game against Auburn. Down 20–7, Manning led the Vols to a 30–29 victory. Throwing for four touchdowns, he was named the game's MVP but injured himself in the process. The No. 3 Vols were matched up with No. 2 Nebraska in the Orange Bowl. Had Tennessee won and top-ranked Michigan lost against Washington State in the Rose Bowl, the Vols would have been expected to win the national championship. However, the Vols' defense could not stop Nebraska's rushing attack, giving up more than 400 yards on the ground in a 42–17 loss. As a senior, Manning won numerous awards He was a consensus first-team All-American and won the Maxwell Award, the Davey O'Brien Award, the Johnny Unitas Award, and the Best College Football Player ESPY Award, among others. However, he did not win the Heisman Trophy, finishing runner-up to Charles Woodson, a cornerback for Michigan and one of only two defensive players ever to win the award (the other being Travis Hunter in 2024).

== Schedule ==
Date	Time	Opponent	Rank	Site	TV	Result	Attendance	Source
August 30	7:45 p.m.	Texas Tech*	No. 5	Neyland Stadium; Knoxville, TN	ESPN	W 52–17	106,285	
September 6	3:30 p.m.	at UCLA*	No. 3	Rose Bowl; Pasadena, CA	ABC	W 30–24	62,619	
September 20	3:30 p.m.	at No. 3 Florida	No. 4	Ben Hill Griffin Stadium; Gainesville, FL (rivalry, College GameDay)	CBS	L 20–33	85,714	
October 4	3:30 p.m.	Ole Miss	No. 9	Neyland Stadium; Knoxville, TN (rivalry)	CBS	W 31–17	106,229	
October 11	3:30 p.m.	No. 13 Georgia	No. 9	Neyland Stadium; Knoxville, TN (rivalry)	CBS	W 38–13	106,656	
October 18	7:00 p.m.	at Alabama	No. 9	Legion Field; Birmingham, AL (Third Saturday in October)	ESPN	W 38–21	83,091	
November 1	12:30 p.m.	South Carolina	No. 8	Neyland Stadium; Knoxville, TN	JPS	W 22–7	106,301	
November 8	4:00 p.m.	No. 24 Southern Miss*	No. 8	Neyland Stadium; Knoxville, TN	PPV	W 44–20	107,073	
November 15	8:00 p.m.	at Arkansas	No. 5	War Memorial Stadium; Little Rock, AR	ESPN2	W 30–22	53,235	
November 22	12:30 p.m.	at Kentucky	No. 5	Commonwealth Stadium; Lexington, KY (rivalry)	ESPN2	W 59–31	61,076	
November 29	12:00 p.m.	Vanderbilt	No. 3	Neyland Stadium; Knoxville, TN (rivalry)	CBS	W 17–10	106,683	
December 6	8:00 p.m.	vs. No. 11 Auburn	No. 3	Georgia Dome; Atlanta, GA (SEC Championship Game)	ABC	W 30–29	74,896	
January 2	8:00 p.m.	vs. No. 2 Nebraska*	No. 3	Pro Player Stadium; Miami Gardens, FL (Orange Bowl, College GameDay)	CBS	L 17–42	74,002	
*Non-conference game; Rankings from AP Poll released prior to the game; All times are in Eastern time

== Rankings ==
Ranking movements Legend: ██ Increase in ranking ██ Decrease in ranking ( ) = First-place votes
	Week																	
Poll	Pre	1	2	3	4	5	6	7	8	9	10	11	12	13	14	15	16	Final
AP	5 (8)	5 (7)	3 (7)	4 (6)	4 (6)	9	9	9	9	8	8	8	5	5	3	3	3	7
Coaches	5 (8)	5 (8)	3 (10)	4 (5)	4 (6)	10	10	10	9	8	8	7	5	5	3	3	3	8

== Game summaries ==
=== Texas Tech ===
Texas Tech at Tennessee

Team	1	2	3	4	Total
Red Raiders	0	3	0	14	17
• No. 5 Volunteers	7	17	21	7	52

- Date: August 30
- Location: Neyland Stadium, Knoxville, Tennessee
- Game start: 7:35 pm EDT
- Elapsed time: 3:20
- Game attendance: 106,285
- Source: Box score

=== At UCLA ===
Tennessee at UCLA

Team	1	2	3	4	Total
• No. 3 Volunteers	9	15	3	3	30
Bruins	0	3	3	18	24

- Date: September 6
- Location: Rose Bowl, Pasadena, California
- Game start: 3:35 pm EDT
- Elapsed time: 3:41
- Game attendance: 62,619
- Source: Box score

Scoring summary
1	8:28	UT	Safety, Leonard Little sack of Cade McNown in end zone	Tenn 2–0
1	3:05	UT	Cory Gaines 57-yard interception return (Jeff Hall kick)	Tenn 9–0
2	9:35	UT	Jeremaine Copeland 24-yard pass from Peyton Manning (conversion)	Tenn 17–0
2	4:07	UT	Marcus Nash 39-yard pass from Peyton Manning (kick)	Tenn 24–0
2		UCLA	Chris Sailer ?-yard field goal	Tenn 24–3
3		UCLA	Chris Sailer ?-yard field goal	Tenn 24–6
3		UT	Jeff Hall ?-yard field goal	Tenn 27–6
4		UCLA	Skip Hicks ?-yard pass from Cade McNown (conversion failed)	Tenn 27–12
4		UCLA	Skip Hicks ?-yard run (conversion failed)	Tenn 27–18
4		UCLA	Skip Hicks ?-yard pass from Cade McNown (conversion failed)	Tenn 27–24
4		UT	Jeff Hall ?-yard field goal	Tenn 30–24

=== At Florida ===
#4 Tennessee Volunteers (2–0) at #3 Florida Gators (2–0)

Quarter	1	2	3	4	Total
Tennessee	0	7	7	6	20
Florida	14	6	6	7	33

at Ben Hill Griffith Stadium, Gainesville, Florida

- Date: September 20
- Game time: 3:30 p.m. EDT
- Game weather: Sunny, 95 °F (35 °C)
- Game attendance: 85,714
- Box Score/Recap

Game information

First quarter

- UF – Jamie Richardson 11-yard pass from Doug Johnson (Collins Cooper kick), 9:43. Florida 7–0.
- UF – Tony George 88-yard interception return (Collins Cooper kick), 0:15. Florida 14–0.

Second quarter

- UT – Jermaine Copeland 22-yard pass from Peyton Manning (Jeff Hall kick), 1:33. Florida 14–7.
- UF – Jacquez Green 19-yard pass from Doug Johnson (kick failed), 0:45. Florida 20–7.

Third quarter

- UF – Collins Cooper 37-yard field goal, 8:33. Florida 23–7.
- UF – Collins Cooper 40-yard field goal, 3:44. Florida 26–7.
- UT – Jermaine Copeland 8-yard pass from Peyton Manning (Jeff Hall kick), 2:32. Florida 26–14.

Fourth quarter

- UF – Taran Ross 30-yard pass from Doug Johnson (Collins Cooper kick), 6:23. Florida 33–14.
- UT – Cedrick Wilson 16-yard pass from Peyton Manning (pass failed), 2:21. Florida 33–20.

Top passers

- UT – Peyton Manning – 29/51, 353 yards, 3 TD, 2 INT
- UF – Doug Johnson – 14/32, 261 yards, 3 TD, 2 INT

Top rushers

- UT – Mark Levine – 4 rushes, 27 yards
- UF – Fred Taylor – 17 rushes, 134 yards

Top receivers

- UT – Andy McCullough – 5 receptions, 105 yards
- UF – Jacquez Green – 8 receptions, 185 yards, TD

=== Ole Miss ===
Ole Miss at Tennessee

Team	1	2	3	4	Total
Rebels	0	3	6	8	17
• No. 9 Volunteers	0	7	14	10	31

- Date: October 4
- Location: Neyland Stadium, Knoxville, Tennessee
- Game start: 3:34 pm EDT
- Elapsed time: 3:15
- Game attendance: 106,229
- Source: Box score

=== Georgia ===
Georgia at Tennessee

Team	1	2	3	4	Total
No. 13 Bulldogs	3	7	0	3	13
• No. 9 Volunteers	7	17	0	14	38

- Date: October 11
- Location: Neyland Stadium, Knoxville, Tennessee
- Game start: 3:41 pm EDT
- Elapsed time: 3:13
- Game attendance: 106,656
- Source: Box score

=== At Alabama ===
Tennessee at Alabama

Team	1	2	3	4	Total
• No. 9 Volunteers	7	14	10	7	38
Crimson Tide	6	0	8	7	21

- Date: October 18
- Location: Legion Field, Birmingham, Alabama
- Game start: 6:06 pm EDT
- Elapsed time: 3:06
- Game attendance: 83,091
- Source: Box score

=== South Carolina ===
South Carolina at Tennessee

Team	1	2	3	4	Total
Gamecocks	0	0	0	7	7
• No. 9 Volunteers	9	0	3	10	22

- Date: November 1
- Location: Neyland Stadium, Knoxville, Tennessee
- Game start: 12:38 pm EDT
- Elapsed time: 3:04
- Game attendance: 106,301
- Source: Box score

=== Southern Miss ===
Southern Miss at Tennessee

Team	1	2	3	4	Total
No. 24 Golden Eagles	7	6	7	0	20
• No. 8 Volunteers	6	14	21	3	44

- Date: November 8
- Location: Neyland Stadium, Knoxville, Tennessee
- Game start: 4:08 pm EST
- Elapsed time: 3:10
- Game attendance: 107,073
- Source: Box score

=== At Arkansas ===
Tennessee at Arkansas

Team	1	2	3	4	Total
• No. 5 Volunteers	7	7	3	13	30
Razorbacks	0	10	6	6	22

- Date: November 15
- Location: War Memorial Stadium, Little Rock, Arkansas
- Game start: 7:15 pm EDT
- Elapsed time: 3:20
- Game attendance: 53,235
- Source: Box score

=== At Kentucky ===
Tennessee at Kentucky

Team	1	2	3	4	Total
• No. 5 Volunteers	17	7	21	14	59
Wildcats	7	14	3	7	31

- Date: November 22
- Location: Commonwealth Stadium, Lexington, Kentucky
- Game start: 12:30 pm EDT
- Elapsed time: 3:40
- Game attendance: 61,076
- Source: Box score

Peyton Manning threw for a school-record 523 yards and tied the school-record with 5 passing touchdowns in this high-scoring win over Kentucky. The single-game TD record fell in 2007 and the single-game yardage record stood until 2012. In all, Manning and Kentucky QB Tim Couch combined for 999 passing yards (Couch threw for a then-school-record 476 yards).

=== Vanderbilt ===
Vanderbilt at Tennessee

Team	1	2	3	4	Total
Commodores	0	3	7	0	10
• No. 3 Volunteers	0	10	7	0	17

- Date: November 29
- Location: Neyland Stadium, Knoxville, Tennessee
- Game start: 12:12 pm EST
- Elapsed time: 3:00
- Game attendance: 106,683

=== Vs. Auburn ===
Tennessee vs Auburn

Team	1	2	3	4	Total
• No. 3 Volunteers	7	3	13	7	30
No. 11 Tigers	13	7	9	0	29

- Date: December 6
- Location: Georgia Dome, Atlanta, Georgia
- Game start: 8:06 pm EST
- Elapsed time: 3:34
- Game attendance: 74,896
- Referee: Al Ford
- Source: Box score

Scoring summary
1	12:41	UT	Peerless Price 40-yard pass from Peyton Manning (Jeff Hall kick)	Tenn 7–0
1	10:25	Aub	Jaret Holmes 30-yard field goal	Tenn 7–3
1	5:36	Aub	Brad Ware 24-yard fumble return (Jaret Holmes kick)	Aub 10–7
1	1:27	Aub	Jaret Holmes 48-yard field goal	Aub 13–7
2	14:12	Aub	Tyrone Goodson 51-yard pass from Dameyune Craig (Jaret Holmes kick)	Aub 20–7
2	7:46	UT	Jeff Hall 27-yard field goal	Aub 20–10
3	11:56	UT	J. Copeland 5-yard pass from Peyton Manning (Jeff Hall kick)	Aub 20–17
3	6:14	Aub	Fred Beasley 24-yard pass from Dameyune Craig (Jaret Holmes kick)	Aub 27–17
3	1:06	UT	Peerless Price 46-yard pass from Peyton Manning (Jeff Hall kick)	Aub 27–23
3	1:06	Aub	Quinton Reese 98-yard PAT return	Aub 29–23
4	11:14	UT	Marcus Nash 73-yard pass from Peyton Manning (Jeff Hall kick)	Tenn 30–29

The Vols struck first just over two minutes into the game, but found themselves trailing 20–7 only 48 seconds into the second quarter. Despite six turnovers, Tennessee clawed all the way back. Peyton Manning threw for 373 yards and 4 TD, including a game winning 73-yard touchdown to Marcus Nash.

=== Vs. Nebraska (Orange Bowl) ===
Tennessee vs Nebraska

Team	1	2	3	4	Total
No. 3 Volunteers	0	3	6	8	17
• No. 2 Cornhuskers	7	7	21	7	42

- Date: January 2, 1998
- Location: Pro Player Stadium, Miami Gardens, Florida
- Game attendance: 72,385

== Roster ==
1997 Tennessee Volunteers football team roster
Players
Coaches
Offense

Pos.	#	Name	Class
RB	24	Shawn Bryson	Jr
OT	67	Chad Clifton	So
OL		Cosey Coleman
WR		Jermaine Copeland
WR		Graff Corby
RB		Phillip Crosby
RB		Brian Darden
TE		Eric Diogu
RB		Derrick Edmonds
OL		Mercedes Hamilton
RB		Travis Henry
TE		Neil Johnson
RB		Mark Levine
RB		Jamal Lewis
QB	16	Peyton Manning	Sr
WR		David Martin
QB	17	Tee Martin	So
WR	88	Andy McCullough	Sr
WR	12	Marcus Nash	Sr
TE		Antron Peebles
WR	37	Peerless Price	Jr
OL		Spencer Riley
OL		Diron Robinson
WR	81	Benjie Shuler	Sr
RB		Travis Stephens
C	70	Trey Teague	Sr
WR		Cedrick Wilson

Defense

Pos.	#	Name	Class
LB	99	Eric Brown	Sr
DE	91	Jonathan Brown	Sr
DL		Jeff Coleman
DL		Bill Duf
DE	93	Shaun Ellis	So
DB	13	Terry Fair	Sr
DB		Cory Gaines
DT	60	Matt Goodin	Jr
DB	23	Dwayne Goodrich	So
DB		Tyrone Graham
DB		Deon Grant
DL		Ron Green
DL		Gerald Griffin
DB		Steve Johnson
DE	1	Leonard Little	Sr
DB		Tori Noel
DL		Billy Raltliff
DE	58	Darwin Walker	So
DB	30	Cory Gaines	Sr
DE	22	Corey Terry	Jr
LB	46	Raynoch Thompson	So
DL		Darwin Walker
DB	42	Eric Westmoreland	So
DB	2	Fred White	So
LB	27	Al Wilson	Jr

Special teams

Pos.	#	Name	Class
K	4	Jeff Hall	Jr
P	43	David Leaverton	Fr

Head coach

- Phillip Fulmer

Coordinators/assistant coaches

- David Cutcliffe – Offensive coordinator/assistant head coach/quarterbacks
- Randy Sanders – Running backs/recruiting coordinator
- Pat Washington – Wide receivers
- Rodney Garner – Tight ends/offensive tackles
- Mark Bradley – Offensive line
- John Chavis – Defensive coordinator/linebackers
- Dan Brooks – Defensive line
- Kevin Ramsey – Defensive backs
- Steve Caldwell – Special teams/defensive ends
- Kurt Roper – Graduate assistant

Legend

- (C) Team captain
- (S) Suspended
- (I) Ineligible
- Injured
- Redshirt

== Awards and honors ==
- Peyton Manning, consensus first-team All-American
- Peyton Manning, Maxwell Award winner
- Peyton Manning, Davey O'Brien Award winner
- Peyton Manning, James E. Sullivan Award
- Peyton Manning, Johnny Unitas Award winner
- Peyton Manning, Best College Football Player ESPY Award winner
- Peyton Manning, runner-up, Heisman Trophy

== Team players drafted into the NFL ==
Tennessee had eight players selected in the 1998 NFL Draft.

Player	Position	Round	Pick	NFL club
Peyton Manning	Quarterback	1	1	Indianapolis Colts
Terry Fair	Cornerback	1	20	Detroit Lions
Marcus Nash	Wide receiver	1	30	Denver Broncos
Leonard Little	Defensive end	3	65	St. Louis Rams
Jonathan Brown	Defensive end	3	90	Green Bay Packers
Trey Teague	Center	7	200	Denver Broncos
Andy McCullough	Wide receiver	7	204	New Orleans Saints
Cory Gaines	Safety	7	231	Indianapolis Colts
