= 1997 Auburn Tigers football team =

American college football season

1997 Auburn Tigers football

SEC Western Division co-champion Chick-Fil-A Peach Bowl champion

SEC Championship Game, L 29–30 vs. Tennessee

Peach Bowl, W 21–17 vs. Clemson
- Conference: Southeastern Conference
- Western Division

Ranking
- Coaches: No. 11
- AP: No. 11
- Record: 10–3 (6–2 SEC)
- Head coach: Terry Bowden (5th season)
- Offensive coordinator: Rodney Allison (1st season)
- Offensive scheme: Pro I formation
- Defensive coordinator: Bill Oliver (2nd season)
- Base defense: 3–4
- Home stadium: Jordan–Hare Stadium

1997 Southeastern Conference football standings
	Conf.			Overall
Team	W		L	W		L
Eastern Division
No. 7 Tennessee x$	7	–	1	11	–	2
No. 10 Georgia	6	–	2	10	–	2
No. 4 Florida	6	–	2	10	–	2
South Carolina	3	–	5	5	–	6
Kentucky	2	–	6	5	–	6
Vanderbilt	0	–	8	3	–	8
Western Division
No. 11 Auburn xy	6	–	2	10	–	3
No. 13 LSU x	6	–	2	9	–	3
No. 22 Ole Miss	4	–	4	8	–	4
Mississippi State	4	–	4	7	–	4
Arkansas	2	–	6	4	–	7
Alabama	2	–	6	4	–	7
Championship: Tennessee 30, Auburn 29
$ – Conference champion; x – Division champion/co-champions; Rankings from AP Poll

The 1997 Auburn Tigers football team represented Auburn University in the 1997 NCAA Division I-A football season. The team, coached by Terry Bowden, finished with a 10–3 record and won the school's first SEC West Division championship, but lost by a point to Tennessee in the 1997 SEC Championship Game. The Tigers ended the season with a #11 ranking in the AP Poll and the Coaches' Poll after winning the Peach Bowl against Clemson on January 2.

== Schedule ==
Date	Time	Opponent	Rank	Site	TV	Result	Attendance	Source
September 4	7:00 p.m.	at Virginia*	No. 18	Scott Stadium; Charlottesville, VA	ESPN	W 28–17	45,300	
September 13	11:30 a.m.	Ole Miss	No. 16	Jordan–Hare Stadium; Auburn, AL (rivalry)	JPS	W 19–9	81,203	
September 20	6:30 p.m.	at No. 10 LSU	No. 12	Tiger Stadium; Baton Rouge, LA (rivalry)	ESPN	W 31–28	80,538	
September 27	6:00 p.m.	UCF*	No. 8	Jordan–Hare Stadium; Auburn, AL	PPV	W 41–14	82,109	
October 4	11:30 a.m.	at South Carolina	No. 8	Williams–Brice Stadium; Columbia, SC	JPS	W 23–6	79,411	
October 11	1:00 p.m.	Louisiana Tech*^{†}	No. 8	Jordan–Hare Stadium; Auburn, AL	PPV	W 49–13	84,761	
October 18	2:30 p.m.	No. 7 Florida	No. 6	Jordan–Hare Stadium; Auburn, AL (rivalry, College GameDay)	CBS	L 10–24	85,214	
October 25	5:00 p.m.	at Arkansas	No. 11	Razorback Stadium; Fayetteville, AR	ESPN2	W 26–21	41,277	
November 1	1:00 p.m.	Mississippi State	No. 11	Jordan–Hare Stadium; Auburn, AL		L 0–20	82,736	
November 15	4:50 p.m.	at No. 7 Georgia	No. 16	Sanford Stadium; Athens, GA (Deep South's Oldest Rivalry)	ESPN	W 45–34	86,117	
November 22	6:30 p.m.	Alabama	No. 13	Jordan–Hare Stadium; Auburn, AL (Iron Bowl)	ESPN	W 18–17	85,214	
December 6	8:00 p.m.	vs. No. 3 Tennessee	No. 11	Georgia Dome; Atlanta, GA (SEC Championship Game, rivalry)	ABC	L 29–30	74,896	
January 2	2:00 p.m.	vs. Clemson*	No. 13	Georgia Dome; Atlanta, GA (Peach Bowl, rivalry)	ESPN	W 21–17	71,212	
*Non-conference game; ^{†}Homecoming; Rankings from AP Poll released prior to the game; All times are in Central time

== Rankings ==
Ranking movements Legend: ██ Increase in ranking ██ Decrease in ranking
	Week																	
Poll	Pre	1	2	3	4	5	6	7	8	9	10	11	12	13	14	15	16	Final
AP	16	17	16	16	12	8	8	8	6	11	11	17	16	13	13	11	13	11
Coaches	19		18	16	12	8	9	8	7	11	11	17	16	13	13	11	13	11

== Game summaries ==
=== At Auburn ===
#7 Florida Gators (5–1) at #6 Auburn Tigers (6–0)

Quarter	1	2	3	4	Total
Florida	10	0	7	7	24
Auburn	7	3	0	0	10

at Jordan–Hare Stadium, Auburn, Alabama

- Date: October 18
- Game time: 2:30 p.m. CDT
- Game weather: Partly cloudy, 65 °F (18 °C)
- Game attendance: 85,244
- Referee: A. Sizemore

Game information

First quarter

- UF – Jamie Richardson 12-yard pass from Jacquez Green (Collins Cooper kick), 11:00. Florida 7–0. Drive: 4 plays, 43 yards, 1:41.
- UF – Collins Cooper 22-yard field goal, 5:49. Florida 10–0. Drive: 8 plays, 19 yards, 4:03.
- AUB – Tyrone Dillard 15-yard pass from Dameyune Craig (Jaret Holmes kick), 0:16. Florida 10–7. Drive: 5 plays, 49 yards, 1:56.

Second quarter

- AUB – Jaret Holmes 20-yard field goal, 0:00. Tie 10–10. Drive: 11 plays, 81 yards, 2:28.

Third quarter

- UF – Jacquez Green 10-yard pass from Noah Brindise (Collins Cooper kick), 7:50. Florida 17–10. Drive: 14 plays, 97 yards, 5:20.

Fourth quarter

- UF – Jacquez Green 5-yard run (Collins Cooper kick), 4:27. Florida 24–10. Drive: 2 plays, 6 yards, 0:49.

Top passers

- UF – Jesse Palmer – 8/14, 92 yards, 2 INT
- AUB – Dameyune Craig – 18/34, 187 yards, TD, INT

Top rushers

- UF – Fred Taylor – 34 rushes, 140 yards
- AUB – Rusty Williams – 8 rushes, 22 yards

Top receivers

- UF – Travis McGriff – 3 receptions, 44 yards
- AUB – Karsten Bailey – 4 receptions, 56 yards
