= 1997 SEC Championship Game =

- Conference Championship
- 1997 SEC Championship logo
Tennessee Volunteers	Auburn Tigers
(10–1)	(9–2)
30	29
Head coach: Phillip Fulmer	Head coach: Terry Bowden
AP / Coaches; 3 / 3	AP / Coaches; 11 / 11
	1	2	3	4	Total
Tennessee	7	3	13	7	30
Auburn	13	7	9	0	29
- Date: December 6, 1997
- Season: 1997
- Stadium: Georgia Dome
- Location: Atlanta, Georgia
- MVP: QB Peyton Manning, Tennessee
- Favorite: Tennessee by 7
- Referee: Al Ford
- Attendance: 74,896

United States TV coverage
- Network: ABC
- Announcers: Keith Jackson (play-by-play); Bob Griese (analyst); Lynn Swann (sideline)

1997 Southeastern Conference football standings
	Conf.			Overall
Team	W		L	W		L
Eastern Division
No. 7 Tennessee x$	7	–	1	11	–	2
No. 10 Georgia	6	–	2	10	–	2
No. 4 Florida	6	–	2	10	–	2
South Carolina	3	–	5	5	–	6
Kentucky	2	–	6	5	–	6
Vanderbilt	0	–	8	3	–	8
Western Division
No. 11 Auburn xy	6	–	2	10	–	3
No. 13 LSU x	6	–	2	9	–	3
No. 22 Ole Miss	4	–	4	8	–	4
Mississippi State	4	–	4	7	–	4
Arkansas	2	–	6	4	–	7
Alabama	2	–	6	4	–	7
Championship: Tennessee 30, Auburn 29
$ – Conference champion; x – Division champion/co-champions; Rankings from AP Poll

The 1997 SEC Championship Game was won by the Tennessee Volunteers, 30–29, over the Auburn Tigers. The game was played in the Georgia Dome in Atlanta, on December 6, 1997, and was televised to a national audience on ABC.
