= Curtis Alexander (gridiron football) =

American football player (born 1974)

No. 40, 32
- Position: Running back

Personal information
- Born: June 11, 1974 (age 52); Memphis, Tennessee, U.S.
- Listed height: 6 ft 1 in (1.85 m)
- Listed weight: 205 lb (93 kg)

Career information
- High school: Whitehaven (Memphis)
- College: Alabama
- NFL draft: 1998: 4th round, 122nd overall pick

Career history
- Denver Broncos (1998–1999)*; Miami Dolphins (2000)*; Birmingham Thunderbolts (2001); Buffalo Bills (2001-2002)*; Frankfurt Galaxy (2002); Hamilton Tiger-Cats (2002)
- * Offseason or practice squad member only

Awards and highlights
- Super Bowl champion (XXXIII)

Curtis Alexander (born June 11, 1974) is a former football player. He played four years of college football for the Alabama Crimson Tide, from 1994 to 1997. He later played professional football in the XFL, NFL Europe, and Canadian Football League (CFL). During the 2002 Frankfurt Galaxy season, he set an NFL Europe single-game total yardage record with 279 yards against Barcelona.

== Early life ==
Alexander played high school football at Whitehaven High School in Memphis, Tennessee. He was a high school All-American, compiled over 2,300 rushing yards as a senior, and was selected Tennessee's high school Player of the Year. He once rushed for 479 yard in a single game for Whitehaven. That 2,346 yards rushing as a senior is still standing as the Whitehaven High School regular season rushing record .

== College career ==
Alexander committed to Alabama in 1993 and was redshirted that fall. He played four years of college football for the Crimson Tide from 1994 to 1997. As a senior in 1997, Alexander totaled 720 rushing yards, 133 receiving yards, and scored eight touchdowns. At the end of his senior season, he was invited to play in the 1997 Blue–Gray Football Classic. He helped lead the Gray to a victory in the game with a 46-yard touchdown catch.

== Professional career ==
Alexander was drafted by the Denver Broncos in the fourth round of 1998 NFL Draft (122nd overall pick). Alexander did not make the 52-man roster and was waived by Denver on August 28, 1998. On August 31, 1998, Alexander was signed to Denver's practice squad and remained there for entire 1998 season. During 1999 training camp, Alexander was waived by Broncos and signed a free agent contract with Miami Dolphins on February 8, 2000. In 2001, Alexander played for the Birmingham Thunderbolts in the XFL where he rushed for 81 yards on 18 carries and returned 15 kicks for 318 yards. He also played for the Frankfurt Galaxy of the NFL Europe during the 2002 season. He set an NFL Europe single-game total yardage record with 279 yards against Barcelona in 2002. Alexander played one game with the Hamilton Tiger-Cats in the 2002 season.
