= Freddie Kitchens =

American football player and coach (born 1974)

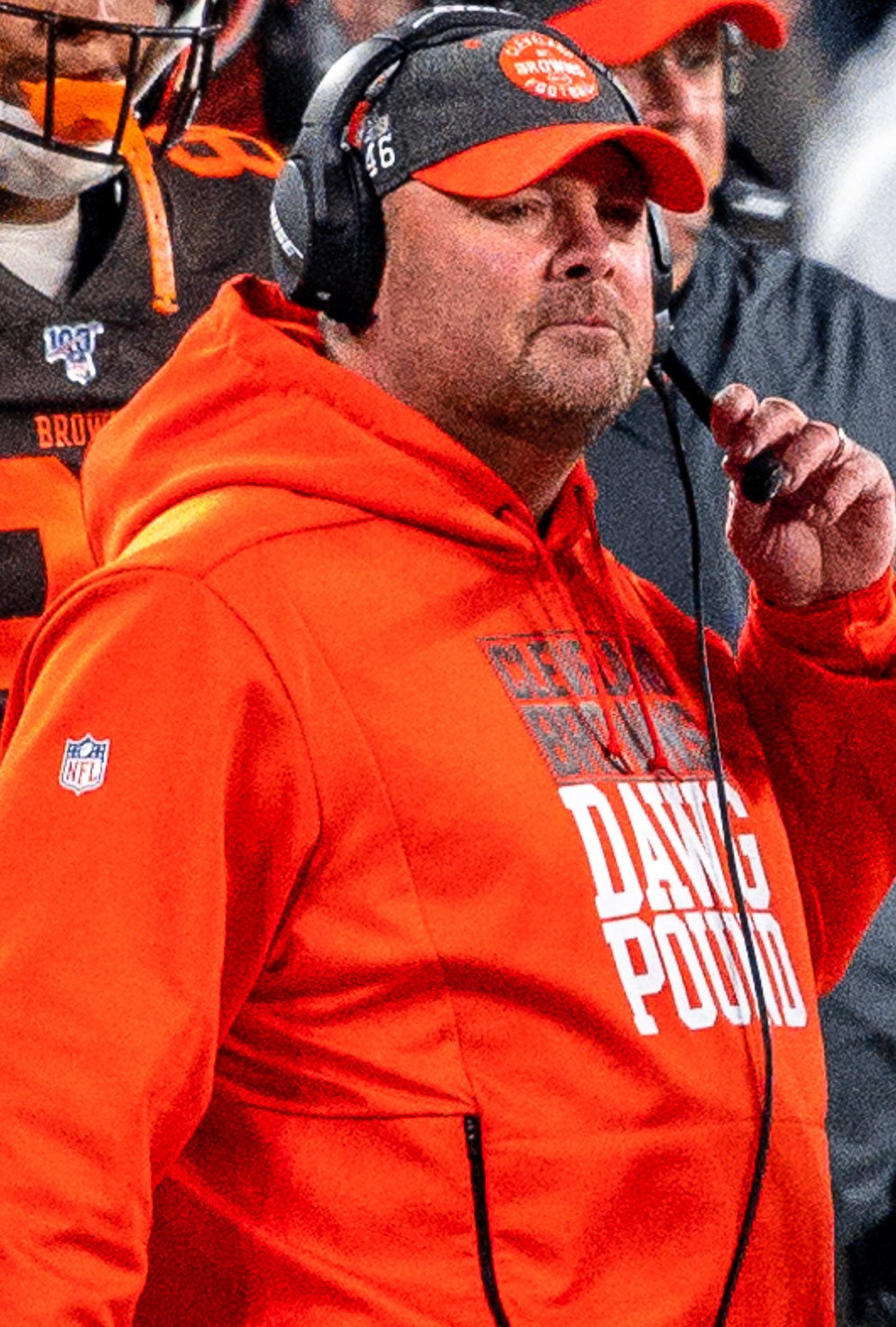
- Kitchens with the Cleveland Browns in 2019

Personal information
- Born: November 29, 1974 (age 51); Gadsden, Alabama, U.S.

Career information
- High school: Etowah (Attalla, Alabama)
- College: Alabama (1993–1997)

Career history
- Glenville State (1999) Running backs coach & tight ends coach; LSU (2000) Graduate assistant; North Texas (2001–2003) Running backs coach; Mississippi State (2004-2005); Tight ends coach (2004); Running backs coach (2005); Dallas Cowboys (2006) Tight ends coach; Arizona Cardinals (2007–2017); Tight ends coach (2007-2012); Quarterbacks coach (2013-2016); Running backs coach (2017); Cleveland Browns (2018-2019); Associate head coach & running backs coach (2018); Interim offensive coordinator (2018); Head coach (2019); New York Giants (2020) Tight ends coach; New York Giants (2021) Senior offensive assistant & interim offensive coordinator; South Carolina (2022) Senior analyst; North Carolina (2023–2025); Tight ends coach and run game coordinator (2023-2024); Interim head coach (2024); Offensive coordinator (2025)

Head coaching record
- Regular season: 6–10 (.375)
- Career: NFL: 6–10 (.375); NCAA: 0–1 (.000)
- Coaching profile at Pro Football Reference

Charles Frederick Kitchens Jr. (born November 29, 1974) is an American football coach who was most recently the offensive coordinator for the North Carolina Tar Heels. He previously served as the tight ends coach and run game coordinator, and later the interim head coach for the Tar Heels' 2024 bowl game prior to the hiring of Bill Belichick. Kitchens has served as the head coach of the Cleveland Browns and an assistant coach for the New York Giants, Arizona Cardinals, and Dallas Cowboys in the National Football League (NFL). He has also spent stints as an assistant coach with Mississippi State, North Texas, LSU, and Glenville State of the NCAA. Kitchens was fired in 2019 after his lone season as a head coach when the Browns finished with a 6–10 record.

== Playing career ==
Kitchens was a quarterback for the Alabama Crimson Tide from 1993 to 1997, where he threw for 4,668 yards, 30 touchdowns, and 26 interceptions. In his three seasons as a starter, Alabama won the 1995 Citrus Bowl and the 1997 Outback Bowl.

At the time of his departure, Kitchens ranked third in the school's history in career passing attempts, fourth in career passing yards, and fifth in career completions.

During his time at Alabama, Kitchens was given the nickname "Thick" by offensive coordinator Bruce Arians.

=== Statistics ===
Year	Team	Games	Passing								Rushing			
Year	Team	GP	Comp	Att	Pct	Yards	Avg	TD	Int	Rate	Att	Yards	Avg	TD
1993	Alabama	6	7	14	50.0	188	13.4	2	3	167.1	8	-12	-1.5	0
1994	Alabama	DNP												
1995	Alabama	7	63	127	49.6	811	6.4	3	5	103.2	50	53	1.1	0
1996	Alabama	12	153	302	50.3	2,124	7.0	14	14	115.4	86	-127	-1.5	1
1997	Alabama	11	121	237	51.1	1,545	6.5	11	4	117.8	48	15	0.3	1
Career		36	343	680	50.4	4,668	6.9	30	26	115.0	192	-71	-0.4	2

== Coaching career ==
=== Dallas Cowboys ===
Following his college playing career, Kitchens served as an assistant coach for several college teams before joining the Dallas Cowboys staff as tight ends coach in 2006 under Bill Parcells.

=== Arizona Cardinals ===
Kitchens worked on the Arizona Cardinals staff from 2007 to 2017. In 2008, the team appeared in Super Bowl XLIII, their first Super Bowl in franchise history but lost to the Pittsburgh Steelers 27–23. He coached multiple positions, including tight ends, quarterbacks, and running backs.

=== Cleveland Browns ===
==== 2018 ====
In 2018, Kitchens was hired as running backs coach for the Cleveland Browns.

On October 29, 2018, the Browns fired head coach Hue Jackson and offensive coordinator Todd Haley. Gregg Williams was named interim head coach, and Kitchens was promoted to offensive coordinator. The Browns went 5–3 to end the season after a 2–5–1 start under Jackson. Kitchens was credited for the improvement of the Browns offense and was also acknowledged for helping Baker Mayfield have a successful rookie season. Mayfield was the runner-up for NFL rookie of the year.

==== 2019 ====
On January 12, 2019, Kitchens was promoted to the head coaching position by the Cleveland Browns. He was the 17th head coach in Browns history, and the ninth since the franchise's reactivation in 1999.

On September 8, 2019, the Browns lost to the Tennessee Titans by a score of 43–13 in Kitchens' head coaching debut. The loss marked the 15th consecutive Week 1 without a win for the Browns. Kitchens was fired a few hours after the final game of the season, a 33–23 loss to the Cincinnati Bengals. The Browns finished the season with a 6–10 record.

=== New York Giants ===
On January 27, 2020, the New York Giants hired Kitchens as their tight ends coach. His hiring was strongly supported by newly hired Giants head coach Joe Judge, who had worked with Kitchens at Mississippi State. The two are reportedly good friends. When Giants offensive coordinator Jason Garrett tested positive for COVID-19 ahead of the Week 15 matchup against the Cleveland Browns, Kitchens' former team, Kitchens was named offensive coordinator and play-caller for the game. The Giants would go on to lose to the Browns by a score of 20–6.

For the 2021 season, it was announced that Kitchens would switch positions and become senior offensive assistant. Following the firing of Garrett, Kitchens was named interim offensive coordinator for the Giants. Kitchens was released after the 2021 season following the firing of Judge.

=== South Carolina ===
On May 18, 2022, Kitchens was hired to be a senior analyst for the South Carolina Gamecocks under head coach Shane Beamer.

=== North Carolina ===
On February 27, 2023, it was reported that Kitchens was joining Mack Brown's staff at North Carolina as tight ends coach, replacing John Lilly. He was formally introduced two days later, at the team's press conference to kick off spring practice. After Brown's dismissal at the end of the 2024 season, Kitchens was named interim head coach for the Fenway Bowl. The Tar Heels were defeated by Connecticut in the bowl game.

Kitchens was retained by new Tar Heels head coach Bill Belichick for the 2025 season, being promoted to offensive coordinator. Following the end of the North Carolina's 2025 season, Kitchens was fired.

== Personal life ==
Kitchens has two daughters with his wife, Ginger.

In 2013, Kitchens underwent emergency surgery to repair an aortic dissection.

== Head coaching record ==
=== NFL ===
Team	Year	Regular season					Postseason			
Team	Year	Won	Lost	Ties	Win %	Finish	Won	Lost	Win %	Result
CLE	2019	6	10	0	.375	3rd in AFC North	—	—	—	—
Total		6	10	0	.375		0	0	.000	

=== College ===
Year	Team	Overall	Conference	Standing	Bowl/playoffs
North Carolina Tar Heels (Atlantic Coast Conference) (2024)
2024	North Carolina	0–1			L Fenway
North Carolina:		0–1			
Total:		0–1			
