= SEC Championship Game =

Annual American football game

- Sport: American football
- Conference: Southeastern Conference
- Current stadium: Mercedes-Benz Stadium
- Current location: Atlanta, Georgia
- Played: 1992–2026
- Last contest: 2025
- Current champion: Georgia
- Most championships: Alabama (11)
- TV partner(s): ABC (1992–2000, 2024–2026); CBS (2001–2023)
- Official website: Official website

Sponsors
- Dr Pepper (1992–2026)

Host stadiums
- Legion Field (1992–1993); Georgia Dome (1994–2016); Mercedes-Benz Stadium (2017–2026)

Host locations
- Birmingham, Alabama (1992–1993); Atlanta, Georgia (1994–2026)

The SEC Championship Game is an annual American football game that determines the Southeastern Conference's season champion. For its first 32 seasons, the championship game pitted the Eastern Division regular season champion against the Western Division regular season champion. With the SEC eliminating football divisions after the 2023 season, the game now features the top two teams in the conference standings. The game is regularly played on the first Saturday of December. The first two editions of the game were held at Legion Field in Birmingham, Alabama, with all subsequent games being held in Atlanta since 1994, first at the Georgia Dome, and at its replacement Mercedes-Benz Stadium since 2017. In November 2026, it was announced that the 2026 SEC Championship Game will be its final edition, as it and the other conference championship games of the 3 fellow power conferences will be discontinued in order to facilitate the expansion of the College Football Playoff to 24 teams.

Eleven of the sixteen current SEC members have played in the SEC Championship Game, with Kentucky, Ole Miss, Texas A&M, Vanderbilt, and Oklahoma being the exceptions. During the divisional era, the overall series was led 19–13 by the Western Division.

While eleven SEC members have played in the game, only six have won: Florida, Georgia, Tennessee, Alabama, Auburn, and LSU. Each of these teams has won the championship multiple times. South Carolina, Mississippi State, Missouri, Arkansas, and Texas have played in the game, but failed to win it.

== History ==
The SEC was the first NCAA conference in any division to hold a football championship game that was exempt from NCAA regular-season game limits. This was made possible in 1987, when the NCAA membership approved a proposal sponsored by the Division II Pennsylvania State Athletic Conference and Central Intercollegiate Athletic Association allowing any conference with at least 12 football members to split into divisions and stage a championship game between the divisional winners. The SEC took advantage of this rule by adding the University of Arkansas and the University of South Carolina in 1992, bringing the conference membership to 12, and splitting into two football divisions. The format has since been adopted by other conferences to decide their football champion (the first being the Big 12 in 1996).

The first two SEC Championship Games were held at Legion Field in Birmingham, Alabama. From 1994 until 2016, the game was played at the Georgia Dome in Atlanta. Following the closure and subsequent demolition of the Georgia Dome in 2017, the SEC Championship Game remained in Atlanta, moving to the new Mercedes-Benz Stadium that replaced the Georgia Dome under a ten-year contract. In November 2023, the SEC signed a five-year extension with Mercedes-Benz Stadium with an additional five-year option which will get the game at the stadium until 2032.

The SEC Championship Game has been played on the first Saturday of December with two exceptions. The 2001 edition was moved to the second Saturday in December so games cancelled during the week of the September 11 attacks could be rescheduled on the first Saturday. The 2020 edition was pushed back to the third week of December as part of the adjustments in the 2020 season for the COVID-19 pandemic.

With the SEC expanding to 16 teams with the 2024 arrival of Oklahoma and Texas, it announced on June 1, 2023, that it would eliminate its football divisions at that time. Championship games from 2024 forward will feature the top two teams in the conference standings. With the College Football Playoff expanding to 24 teams beginning in 2027, the 2026 SEC Championship Game will be its final edition, as it and the other conference championship games of the power conferences will be discontinued in order to facilitate the expansion.

– Member school
– Championship Game site

Between 2006 and 2013, the winner of the SEC Championship Game went on to play in the BCS National Championship Game eight straight years, posting a 7-1record. Since 2014, the SEC Championship Game winner has gone on to appear in the College Football Playoff every season, posting a 8–2 record in the national semi-final and a 4–4 record in the College Football Playoff National Championship. Two of these losses in the National Championship were to another team from the SEC, including a rematch of the 2021 SEC Championship game in the eventual National Championship.

== Results ==
Results from all SEC Championship games that have been played. Rankings are from the AP Poll released prior to matchup.

Year	Western Division		Eastern Division		Site	Attendance	TV rating	MVP
1992	2 Alabama	28	12 Florida	21	Legion Field • Birmingham, AL	83,091	9.8	CB Antonio Langham, Alabama
1993	16 Alabama	13	9 Florida	28	Legion Field • Birmingham, AL	76,345		QB Terry Dean, Florida
1994	3 Alabama	23	6 Florida	24	Georgia Dome • Atlanta, GA	74,751	10.5	DT Ellis Johnson, Florida
1995	23 Arkansas	3	2 Florida	34	Georgia Dome • Atlanta, GA	71,325	7.2	QB Danny Wuerffel, Florida
1996	11 Alabama	30	4 Florida	45	Georgia Dome • Atlanta, GA	74,132	7.0	QB Danny Wuerffel, Florida
1997	11 Auburn	29	3 Tennessee	30	Georgia Dome • Atlanta, GA	74,896		QB Peyton Manning, Tennessee
1998	23 Mississippi State	14	1 Tennessee	24	Georgia Dome • Atlanta, GA	74,795		WR Peerless Price, Tennessee
1999	7 Alabama	34	5 Florida	7	Georgia Dome • Atlanta, GA	71,500		WR Freddie Milons, Alabama
2000	18 Auburn	6	7 Florida	28	Georgia Dome • Atlanta, GA	73,427		QB Rex Grossman, Florida
2001	21 LSU	31	2 Tennessee	20	Georgia Dome • Atlanta, GA	74,843	7.0	QB Matt Mauck, LSU
2002	22 Arkansas	3	4 Georgia	30	Georgia Dome • Atlanta, GA	75,835	3.2	QB David Greene, Georgia
2003	3 LSU	34	5 Georgia	13	Georgia Dome • Atlanta, GA	74,913	4.1	RB Justin Vincent, LSU
2004	3 Auburn	38	15 Tennessee	28	Georgia Dome • Atlanta, GA	74,892	4.8	QB Jason Campbell, Auburn
2005	3 LSU	14	13 Georgia	34	Georgia Dome • Atlanta, GA	73,717	3.9	QB D. J. Shockley, Georgia
2006	8 Arkansas	28	4 Florida	38	Georgia Dome • Atlanta, GA	73,374	4.7	WR Percy Harvin, Florida
2007	5 LSU	21	15 Tennessee	14	Georgia Dome • Atlanta, GA	73,832	6.0	QB Ryan Perrilloux, LSU
2008	1 Alabama	20	2 Florida	31	Georgia Dome • Atlanta, GA	75,892	10.4	QB Tim Tebow, Florida
2009	2 Alabama	32	1 Florida	13	Georgia Dome • Atlanta, GA	75,514	11.8	QB Greg McElroy, Alabama
2010	1 Auburn	56	19 South Carolina	17	Georgia Dome • Atlanta, GA	75,802	6.3	QB Cam Newton, Auburn
2011	1 LSU	42	12 Georgia	10	Georgia Dome • Atlanta, GA	74,515	7.4	CB Tyrann Mathieu, LSU
2012	2 Alabama	32	3 Georgia	28	Georgia Dome • Atlanta, GA	75,624	10.0	RB Eddie Lacy, Alabama
2013	3 Auburn	59	5 Missouri	42	Georgia Dome • Atlanta, GA	75,632	8.7	RB Tre Mason, Auburn
2014	1 Alabama	42	14 Missouri	13	Georgia Dome • Atlanta, GA	73,526	7.7	QB Blake Sims, Alabama
2015	2 Alabama	29	18 Florida	15	Georgia Dome • Atlanta, GA	75,320	8.3	RB Derrick Henry, Alabama
2016	1 Alabama	54	15 Florida	16	Georgia Dome • Atlanta, GA	74,632	7.0	LB Reuben Foster, Alabama
2017	4 Auburn	7	6 Georgia	28	Mercedes-Benz Stadium • Atlanta, GA	76,532	8.4	LB Roquan Smith, Georgia
2018	1 Alabama	35	4 Georgia	28	Mercedes-Benz Stadium • Atlanta, GA	77,141	10.5	RB Josh Jacobs, Alabama
2019	1 LSU	37	4 Georgia	10	Mercedes-Benz Stadium • Atlanta, GA	74,150	7.9	QB Joe Burrow, LSU
2020	1 Alabama	52	11 Florida	46	Mercedes-Benz Stadium • Atlanta, GA	16,520‡	4.9	RB Najee Harris, Alabama
2021	3 Alabama	41	1 Georgia	24	Mercedes-Benz Stadium • Atlanta, GA	78,030	8.2	QB Bryce Young, Alabama
2022	14 LSU	30	1 Georgia	50	Mercedes-Benz Stadium • Atlanta, GA	74,810	5.6	QB Stetson Bennett, Georgia
2023	8 Alabama	27	1 Georgia	24	Mercedes-Benz Stadium • Atlanta, GA	78,320	8.9	QB Jalen Milroe, Alabama
Year	No. 1 seed		No. 2 seed		Site	Attendance	TV rating	MVP
2024	2 Texas	19	5 Georgia	22^{OT}	Mercedes-Benz Stadium • Atlanta, GA	74,916	8.6	CB Daylen Everette, Georgia
2025	9 Alabama	7	3 Georgia	28	Mercedes-Benz Stadium • Atlanta, GA	77,247		QB Gunner Stockton, Georgia
2026	Georgia				Mercedes-Benz Stadium • Atlanta, GA			

‡ 2020 game attendance limited due to the COVID-19 pandemic.

=== Results by team ===
Appearances	Team	Wins	Losses	Win %	Year(s) won	Year(s) lost
16	Alabama	11	5	.688	1992, 1999, 2009, 2012, 2014, 2015, 2016, 2018, 2020, 2021, 2023	1993, 1994, 1996, 2008, 2025
14	Georgia	6	7	.462	2002, 2005, 2017, 2022, 2024, 2025	2003, 2011, 2012, 2018, 2019, 2021, 2023
13	Florida	7	6	.538	1993, 1994, 1995, 1996, 2000, 2006, 2008	1992, 1999, 2009, 2015, 2016, 2020
7	LSU	5	2	.714	2001, 2003, 2007, 2011, 2019	2005, 2022
6	Auburn	3	3	.500	2004, 2010, 2013	1997, 2000, 2017
5	Tennessee	2	3	.400	1997, 1998	2001, 2004, 2007
3	Arkansas	0	3	.000		1995, 2002, 2006
2	Missouri	0	2	.000		2013, 2014
1	Mississippi State	0	1	.000		1998
1	South Carolina	0	1	.000		2010
1	Texas	0	1	.000		2024
0	Kentucky	0	0	–		
0	Oklahoma	0	0	–		
0	Ole Miss	0	0	–		
0	Texas A&M	0	0	–		
0	Vanderbilt	0	0	–		

- Kentucky, Oklahoma, Ole Miss, Texas A&M, and Vanderbilt have yet to make an appearance in an SEC Championship Game.

=== Home/away designation ===
During the championship's divisional era, the team designated as the "home" team alternated between division champions. The designation went to the Eastern champion in even-numbered years and the Western champion in odd-numbered years.

After the 2020 contest, the designated "home" team is 16–13 overall in SEC championship games.

In 2009, the Western champion, Alabama, was the home team, ending a streak where the SEC Western team had worn white jerseys in nine consecutive SEC Championship Games (2000–2008). This was because LSU had represented the West in the previous four seasons that the Western Division champion was the "home" team, and LSU traditionally chooses to wear white jerseys for home games. Additionally, for the next three years (2010–2012), the Eastern Division representative wore their home jerseys because in 2011, LSU again represented the West; this happened again from 2018 to 2020 since LSU represented the West in 2019.

In the current format, the No. 1 seed is designated as the home team.

=== Rematches ===
While SEC schools played every other member of their own division during the conference's divisional era, they did not play every member of the opposite division. With the end of divisional play, each SEC member will play only eight of the 15 other teams in the conference. Thus, the SEC Championship game is not guaranteed to be a rematch of a regular-season game. The SEC Championship game has featured a rematch of a regular-season game a total of nine times (1999, 2000, 2001, 2003, 2004, 2010, 2017, 2024, 2025). The team which won the regular-season game is 6–3 in the rematches, the exceptions being 2001, 2017, and 2025.

=== Common matchups ===
Matchups that have occurred more than once:

# of Times	Matchup	Record	Years played
10	Florida vs. Alabama	Alabama 6–4	1992, 1993, 1994, 1996, 1999, 2008, 2009, 2015, 2016, 2020
5	Georgia vs. LSU	LSU 3–2	2003, 2005, 2011, 2019, 2022
5	Georgia vs. Alabama	Alabama 4–1	2012, 2018, 2021, 2023, 2025
2	Florida vs. Arkansas	Florida 2–0	1995, 2006
2	Tennessee vs. Auburn	Tied 1–1	1997, 2004
2	Tennessee vs. LSU	LSU 2–0	2001, 2007

== Selection criteria ==
The SEC's tiebreakers changed when they eliminated divisions in 2024. The tiebreaker is applied to any number of tied teams, and is repeated until only one team (or two in the case of teams being tied for first and second in the standings) remains.

=== Tie-breaker procedure ===
1. Head-to-head competition between the tied teams.
2. Record versus all common conference opponents among the tied teams.
3. Record against highest (best) placed common conference opponent in the conference standings, and proceeding through the conference standings among the tied teams.
4. Cumulative Conference winning percentage of all conference opponents among the tied teams .
5. Capped relative total scoring margin (see Appendix A) per SportSource Analytics versus all conference opponents among the tied teams.
6. Random draw of the tied teams.

== Game records ==
Team	Performance vs. opponent	Year
Most points scored	59, Auburn vs. Missouri	2013
Most points scored (losing team)	46, Florida vs. Alabama	2020
Most points scored (both teams)	101, Auburn vs. Missouri	2013
Most points scored in a half	35, LSU vs. Georgia – 2nd half 2011	2011
Most points scored in a half (both teams)	55, Auburn (28) vs Missouri (27) – 1st half	2013
Fewest points scored	3, Arkansas vs. Florida; 3, Arkansas vs. Georgia	1995; 2002
Fewest points scored (winning team)	21, LSU vs. Tennessee	2007
Largest margin of victory	39, Auburn vs. South Carolina	2010
First downs	33, Alabama vs. Florida	2020
Rushing yards	545, Auburn vs. Missouri	2013
Passing yards	502, LSU vs. Georgia	2022
Total yards	677, Auburn vs. Missouri	2013
Most punts	10, Alabama; 10, Auburn; 10, Mississippi State	1992; 1997; 1998
Fewest punts	1, Auburn	2010
Individual	Performance, team vs. opponent	Year
Total offense	461, Bryce Young (421 pass, 40 rush) (Alabama vs. Georgia)	2021
Touchdowns responsible for	6, Danny Wuerffel (Florida vs. Alabama); 6, Cam Newton (Auburn vs. South Carolina)	1996; 2010
Rushing yards	304, Tre Mason (Auburn vs. Missouri)	2013
Rushing TDs	4, Tre Mason (Auburn vs. Missouri)	2013
Passing yards	421, Bryce Young (Alabama vs. Georgia)	2021
Passing TDs	6, Danny Wuerffel (Florida vs. Alabama)	1996
Receptions	15, DeVonta Smith (Alabama vs. Florida)	2020
Receiving yards	217, Darvin Adams (Auburn vs. South Carolina)	2010
Receiving TDs	3, Reidel Anthony (Florida vs. Alabama); 3, Najee Harris (Alabama vs. Florida)	1996; 2020
Tackles	18, Omar Gaither (Tennessee vs. Auburn)	2004
Sacks	2.0, done eleven times Last by Mykel Williams (Georgia vs. Texas)	2024
Interceptions	2, Michael Gilmore (Florida vs. Alabama); 2, Tommy Johnson (Alabama vs. Florida); 2, Marcus Spencer (Alabama vs. Florida); 2, Lito Sheppard (Florida vs. Auburn); 2, Derek Stingley Jr. (LSU vs. Georgia); 2, Daylen Everette (Georgia vs. Texas)	1993; 1993; 1999; 2000; 2019; 2024
Punts	10, Bryne Diehl (Alabama vs. Florida); 10, Jaret Holmes (Auburn vs. Tennessee)	1992; 1997
Field goals made	4, Bert Auburn (Texas vs. Georgia)	2024
Long plays	Performance, team vs. opponent	Year
Touchdown run	87 yards, Justin Vincent (LSU vs. Georgia)	2003
Touchdown pass	94 yards, Freddie Kitchens to Michael Vaughn (Alabama vs. Florida)	1996
Kickoff return	50 yards, Lennon Creer (Tennessee vs. LSU)	2007
Punt return	85 yards, Antonio Callaway (Florida vs. Alabama)	2015
Interception return	77 yards, Jayson Bray (Auburn vs. Tennessee)	1997
Fumble return	95 yards, Ben Hanks (Florida vs. Arkansas)	1995
Punt	68 yards, Jake Camarda (Georgia vs. Alabama)	2021
Field goal	52 yards, Cody Parkey (Auburn vs. Missouri)	2013
Game attendance	83,091, Alabama vs. Florida	1992

== See also ==
- List of NCAA Division I FBS conference championship games
