= List of Big 12 Conference football standings =

The Big 12 Conference first sponsored football in 1996, and has kept annual standings since establishment.

== Standings ==
=== 1990-2000 ===
1996 Big 12 Conference football standings
	Conf.			Overall
Team	W		L	W		L
North Division
No. 6 Nebraska x%	8	–	0	11	–	2
No. 8 Colorado	7	–	1	10	–	2
No. 17 Kansas State	6	–	2	9	–	3
Missouri	3	–	5	5	–	6
Kansas	2	–	6	4	–	7
Iowa State	1	–	7	2	–	9
South Division
No. 23 Texas x$	6	–	2	8	–	5
Texas Tech	5	–	3	7	–	5
Texas A&M	4	–	4	6	–	6
Oklahoma	3	–	5	3	–	8
Oklahoma State	2	–	6	5	–	6
Baylor	1	–	7	4	–	7
Championship: Texas 37, Nebraska 27
x – Division champion/co-champions; $ – Bowl Alliance representative as champion % – Bowl Alliance at-large representative; Rankings from AP Poll

1998 Big 12 Conference football standings
	Conf.			Overall
Team	W		L	W		L
North Division
No. 10 Kansas State x	8	–	0	11	–	2
No. 19 Nebraska	5	–	3	9	–	4
No. 21 Missouri	5	–	3	8	–	4
Colorado	4	–	4	8	–	4
Kansas	1	–	7	4	–	7
Iowa State	1	–	7	3	–	8
South Division
No. 11 Texas A&M x$	7	–	1	11	–	3
No. 15 Texas	6	–	2	9	–	3
Texas Tech	4	–	4	7	–	5
Oklahoma State	3	–	5	5	–	6
Oklahoma	3	–	5	5	–	6
Baylor	1	–	7	2	–	9
Championship: Texas A&M 36, Kansas State 33
$ – BCS representative as conference champion; x – Division champion/co-champions; Rankings from AP Poll

1997 Big 12 Conference football standings
	Conf.			Overall
Team	W		L	W		L
North Division
No. 2 Nebraska † xy$	8	–	0	13	–	0
No. 8 Kansas State %	7	–	1	11	–	1
No. 23 Missouri	5	–	3	7	–	5
Colorado	3	–	5	5	–	6
Kansas	3	–	5	5	–	6
Iowa State	1	–	7	1	–	10
South Division
No. 20 Texas A&M xy	6	–	2	9	–	4
No. 24 Oklahoma State	5	–	3	8	–	4
Texas Tech	5	–	3	6	–	5
Texas	2	–	6	4	–	7
Oklahoma	2	–	6	4	–	8
Baylor	1	–	7	2	–	9
Championship: Nebraska 54, Texas A&M 15
x – Division champion/co-champions; y – Championship game participant; † – Coaches Poll National Champion $ – Bowl Alliance representative as champion % – Bowl Alliance at-large representative; Rankings from AP Poll

1999 Big 12 Conference football standings
	Conf.			Overall
Team	W		L	W		L
North Division
No. 3 Nebraska xy$	7	–	1	12	–	1
No. 6 Kansas State x	7	–	1	11	–	1
Colorado	5	–	3	7	–	5
Kansas	3	–	5	5	–	7
Iowa State	1	–	7	4	–	7
Missouri	1	–	7	4	–	7
South Division
No. 21 Texas xy	6	–	2	9	–	5
Oklahoma	5	–	3	7	–	5
Texas Tech	5	–	3	6	–	5
No. 23 Texas A&M	5	–	3	8	–	4
Oklahoma State	3	–	5	5	–	6
Baylor	0	–	8	1	–	10
Championship: Nebraska 22, Texas 6
$ – BCS representative as conference champion; x – Division champion/co-champions; y – Championship game participant; Rankings from AP Poll

=== 2000-2010 ===
2000 Big 12 Conference football standings
	Conf.			Overall
Team	W		L	W		L
North Division
No. 9 Kansas State xy	6	–	2	11	–	3
No. 8 Nebraska x	6	–	2	10	–	2
No. 25 Iowa State	5	–	3	9	–	3
Colorado	3	–	5	3	–	8
Kansas	2	–	6	4	–	7
Missouri	2	–	6	3	–	8
South Division
No. 1 Oklahoma x$#	8	–	0	13	–	0
No. 12 Texas	7	–	1	9	–	3
Texas A&M	5	–	3	7	–	5
Texas Tech	3	–	5	7	–	6
Oklahoma State	1	–	7	3	–	8
Baylor	0	–	8	2	–	9
Championship: Oklahoma 27, Kansas State 24
# – BCS National Champion; $ – BCS representative as conference champion; x – Division champion/co-champions; y – Championship game participant; Rankings from AP Poll

2001 Big 12 Conference football standings
	Conf.			Overall
Team	W		L	W		L
North Division
No. 9 Colorado xy$	7	–	1	10	–	3
No. 8 Nebraska x%	7	–	1	11	–	2
Iowa State	4	–	4	7	–	5
Kansas State	3	–	5	6	–	6
Missouri	3	–	5	4	–	7
Kansas	1	–	7	3	–	8
South Division
No. 5 Texas xy	7	–	1	11	–	2
No. 6 Oklahoma	6	–	2	11	–	2
Texas Tech	4	–	4	7	–	5
Texas A&M	4	–	4	8	–	4
Oklahoma State	2	–	6	4	–	7
Baylor	0	–	8	3	–	8
Championship: Colorado 39, Texas 37
$ – BCS representative as conference champion; % – BCS at-large representative; x – Division champion/co-champions; y – Championship game participant; Rankings from AP Poll

2002 Big 12 Conference football standings
	Conf.			Overall
Team	W		L	W		L
North Division
No. 20 Colorado xy	7	–	1	9	–	5
No. 7 Kansas State	6	–	2	11	–	2
Iowa State	4	–	4	7	–	7
Nebraska	3	–	5	7	–	7
Missouri	2	–	6	5	–	7
Kansas	0	–	8	2	–	10
South Division
No. 5 Oklahoma xy$	6	–	2	12	–	2
No. 6 Texas x	6	–	2	11	–	2
Texas Tech	5	–	3	9	–	5
Oklahoma State	5	–	3	8	–	5
Texas A&M	3	–	5	6	–	6
Baylor	1	–	7	3	–	9
Championship: Oklahoma 29, Colorado 7
$ – BCS representative as conference champion; x – Division champion/co-champions; y – Championship game participant; Rankings from AP Poll

2003 Big 12 Conference football standings
	Conf.			Overall
Team	W		L	W		L
North Division
No. 14 Kansas State x$	6	–	2	11	–	4
No. 19 Nebraska	5	–	3	10	–	3
Missouri	4	–	4	8	–	5
Kansas	3	–	5	6	–	7
Colorado	3	–	5	5	–	7
Iowa State	0	–	8	2	–	10
South Division
No. 3 Oklahoma x%	8	–	0	12	–	2
No. 12 Texas	7	–	1	10	–	3
Oklahoma State	5	–	3	9	–	4
Texas Tech	4	–	4	8	–	5
Texas A&M	2	–	6	4	–	8
Baylor	1	–	7	3	–	9
Championship: Kansas State 35, Oklahoma 7
$ – BCS representative as conference champion; % – BCS at-large representative; x – Division champion/co-champions; Rankings from AP Poll

2004 Big 12 Conference football standings
	Conf.			Overall
Team	W		L	W		L
North Division
Colorado xy	4	–	4	8	–	5
Iowa State x	4	–	4	7	–	5
Nebraska	3	–	5	5	–	6
Missouri	3	–	5	5	–	6
Kansas	2	–	6	4	–	7
Kansas State	2	–	6	4	–	7
South Division
No. 3 Oklahoma xy$	8	–	0	12	–	1
No. 5 Texas %	7	–	1	11	–	1
Texas A&M	5	–	3	7	–	5
No. 18 Texas Tech	5	–	3	8	–	4
Oklahoma State	4	–	4	7	–	5
Baylor	1	–	7	3	–	8
Championship: Oklahoma 42, Colorado 3
$ – BCS representative as conference champion; % – BCS at-large representative; x – Division champion/co-champions; y – Championship game participant; Rankings from AP Poll

2005 Big 12 Conference football standings
	Conf.			Overall
Team	W		L	W		L
North Division
Colorado x	5	–	3	7	–	6
No. 24 Nebraska	4	–	4	8	–	4
Missouri	4	–	4	7	–	5
Iowa State	4	–	4	7	–	5
Kansas	3	–	5	7	–	5
Kansas State	2	–	6	5	–	6
South Division
No. 1 Texas x$#	8	–	0	13	–	0
No. 20 Texas Tech	6	–	2	9	–	3
No. 22 Oklahoma	6	–	2	8	–	4
Texas A&M	3	–	5	5	–	6
Baylor	2	–	6	5	–	6
Oklahoma State	1	–	7	4	–	7
Championship: Texas 70, Colorado 3
# – BCS National Champion; $ – BCS representative as conference champion; x – Division champion/co-champions; Rankings from AP Poll

2006 Big 12 Conference football standings
	Conf.			Overall
Team	W		L	W		L
North Division
Nebraska x	6	–	2	9	–	5
Missouri	4	–	4	8	–	5
Kansas State	4	–	4	7	–	6
Kansas	3	–	5	6	–	6
Colorado	2	–	6	2	–	10
Iowa State	1	–	7	4	–	8
South Division
No. 11 Oklahoma x$	7	–	1	11	–	3
No. 13 Texas	6	–	2	10	–	3
Texas A&M	5	–	3	9	–	4
Texas Tech	4	–	4	8	–	5
Oklahoma State	3	–	5	7	–	6
Baylor	3	–	5	4	–	8
Championship: Oklahoma 21, Nebraska 7
$ – BCS representative as conference champion; x – Division champion/co-champions; Rankings from AP Poll

2007 Big 12 Conference football standings
	Conf.			Overall
Team	W		L	W		L
North Division
No. 4 Missouri xy	7	–	1	12	–	2
No. 7 Kansas x%	7	–	1	12	–	1
Colorado	4	–	4	6	–	7
Kansas State	3	–	5	5	–	7
Nebraska	2	–	6	5	–	7
Iowa State	2	–	6	3	–	9
South Division
No. 8 Oklahoma xy$	6	–	2	11	–	3
No. 10 Texas	5	–	3	10	–	3
No. 22 Texas Tech	4	–	4	9	–	4
Oklahoma State	4	–	4	7	–	6
Texas A&M	4	–	4	7	–	6
Baylor	0	–	8	3	–	9
Championship: Oklahoma 38, Missouri 17
$ – BCS representative as conference champion; % – BCS at-large representative; x – Division champion/co-champions; y – Championship game participant; Rankings from AP Poll

2008 Big 12 Conference football standings
	Conf.			Overall
Team	W		L	W		L
North Division
No. 19 Missouri xy	5	–	3	10	–	4
Nebraska x	5	–	3	9	–	4
Kansas	4	–	4	8	–	5
Colorado	2	–	6	5	–	7
Kansas State	2	–	6	5	–	7
Iowa State	0	–	8	2	–	10
South Division
No. 5 Oklahoma xy$	7	–	1	12	–	2
No. 4 Texas x%	7	–	1	12	–	1
No. 12 Texas Tech x	7	–	1	11	–	2
No. 16 Oklahoma State	5	–	3	9	–	4
Baylor	2	–	6	4	–	8
Texas A&M	2	–	6	4	–	8
Championship: Oklahoma 62, Missouri 21
$ – BCS representative as conference champion; % – BCS at-large representative; x – Division champion/co-champions; y – Championship game participant; Rankings from AP Poll

2009 Big 12 Conference football standings
	Conf.			Overall
Team	W		L	W		L
North Division
No. 14 Nebraska x	6	–	2	10	–	4
Missouri	4	–	4	8	–	5
Kansas State	4	–	4	6	–	6
Iowa State	3	–	5	7	–	6
Colorado	2	–	6	3	–	9
Kansas	1	–	7	5	–	7
South Division
No. 2 Texas x$	8	–	0	13	–	1
Oklahoma State	6	–	2	9	–	4
No. 21 Texas Tech	5	–	3	9	–	4
Oklahoma	5	–	3	8	–	5
Texas A&M	3	–	5	6	–	7
Baylor	1	–	7	4	–	8
Championship: Texas 13, Nebraska 12
$ – BCS representative as conference champion; x – Division champion/co-champions; Rankings from AP Poll

=== 2010-2020 ===
2010 Big 12 Conference football standings
	Conf.			Overall
Team	W		L	W		L
North Division
No. 20 Nebraska xy	6	–	2	10	–	4
No. 18 Missouri x	6	–	2	10	–	3
Kansas State	3	–	5	7	–	6
Iowa State	3	–	5	5	–	7
Colorado	2	–	6	5	–	7
Kansas	1	–	7	3	–	9
South Division
No. 6 Oklahoma xy$	6	–	2	12	–	2
No. 13 Oklahoma State x	6	–	2	11	–	2
No. 19 Texas A&M x	6	–	2	9	–	4
Baylor	4	–	4	7	–	6
Texas Tech	3	–	5	8	–	5
Texas	2	–	6	5	–	7
Championship: Oklahoma 23, Nebraska 20
$ – BCS representative as conference champion; x – Division champion/co-champions; y – Championship game participant; Rankings from AP Poll

2011 Big 12 Conference football standings
	Conf.			Overall
Team	W		L	W		L
No. 3 Oklahoma State $	8	–	1	12	–	1
No. 15 Kansas State	7	–	2	10	–	3
No. 13 Baylor	6	–	3	10	–	3
No. 16 Oklahoma	6	–	3	10	–	3
Missouri	5	–	4	8	–	5
Texas	4	–	5	8	–	5
Texas A&M	4	–	5	7	–	6
Iowa State	3	–	6	6	–	7
Texas Tech	2	–	7	5	–	7
Kansas	0	–	9	2	–	10
$ – BCS representative as conference champion; Rankings from AP Poll

2012 Big 12 Conference football standings
	Conf.			Overall
Team	W		L	W		L
No. 12 Kansas State $+	8	–	1	11	–	2
No. 15 Oklahoma +	8	–	1	10	–	3
No. 19 Texas	5	–	4	9	–	4
Oklahoma State	5	–	4	8	–	5
Baylor	4	–	5	8	–	5
TCU	4	–	5	7	–	6
Texas Tech	4	–	5	8	–	5
West Virginia	4	–	5	7	–	6
Iowa State	3	–	6	6	–	7
Kansas	0	–	9	1	–	11
$ – BCS representative as conference champion; + – Conference co-champions; Rankings from AP Poll

2013 Big 12 Conference football standings
	Conf.			Overall
Team	W		L	W		L
No. 13 Baylor $	8	–	1	11	–	2
No. 6 Oklahoma %	7	–	2	11	–	2
No. 17 Oklahoma State	7	–	2	10	–	3
Texas	7	–	2	8	–	5
Kansas State	5	–	4	8	–	5
Texas Tech	4	–	5	8	–	5
TCU	2	–	7	4	–	8
West Virginia	2	–	7	4	–	8
Iowa State	2	–	7	3	–	9
Kansas	1	–	8	3	–	9
$ – BCS representative as conference champion; % – BCS at-large representative; Rankings from AP Poll

2014 Big 12 Conference football standings
	Conf.			Overall
Team	W		L	W		L
No. 7 Baylor +	8	–	1	11	–	2
No. 3 TCU +	8	–	1	12	–	1
No. 18 Kansas State	7	–	2	9	–	4
Oklahoma	5	–	4	8	–	5
West Virginia	5	–	4	7	–	6
Texas	5	–	4	6	–	7
Oklahoma State	4	–	5	7	–	6
Texas Tech	2	–	7	4	–	8
Kansas	1	–	8	3	–	9
Iowa State	0	–	9	2	–	10
+ – Conference co-champions; Rankings from AP Poll

2015 Big 12 Conference football standings
	Conf.			Overall
Team	W		L	W		L
No. 5 Oklahoma $^	8	–	1	11	–	2
No. 20 Oklahoma State	7	–	2	10	–	3
No. 7 TCU	7	–	2	11	–	2
No. 13 Baylor	6	–	3	10	–	3
West Virginia	4	–	5	8	–	5
Texas Tech	4	–	5	7	–	6
Texas	4	–	5	5	–	7
Kansas State	3	–	6	6	–	7
Iowa State	2	–	7	3	–	9
Kansas	0	–	9	0	–	12
^ – College Football Playoff participant; $ – Conference champion; Rankings from AP Poll

2016 Big 12 Conference football standings
	Conf.			Overall
Team	W		L	W		L
No. 5 Oklahoma $	9	–	0	11	–	2
No. 11 Oklahoma State	7	–	2	10	–	3
No. 18 West Virginia	7	–	2	10	–	3
Kansas State	6	–	3	9	–	4
TCU	4	–	5	6	–	7
Baylor	3	–	6	7	–	6
Texas	3	–	6	5	–	7
Texas Tech	3	–	6	5	–	7
Iowa State	2	–	7	3	–	9
Kansas	1	–	8	2	–	10
$ – Conference champion; Rankings from AP Poll

2017 Big 12 Conference football standings
	Conf.			Overall
Team	W		L	W		L
No. 3 Oklahoma y$^	8	–	1	12	–	2
No. 9 TCU y	7	–	2	11	–	3
No. 14 Oklahoma State	6	–	3	10	–	3
Texas	5	–	4	7	–	6
West Virginia	5	–	4	7	–	6
Kansas State	5	–	4	8	–	5
Iowa State	5	–	4	8	–	5
Texas Tech	3	–	6	6	–	7
Baylor	1	–	8	1	–	11
Kansas	0	–	9	1	–	11
Championship: Oklahoma 41, TCU 17
^ – College Football Playoff participant; $ – Conference champion; y – Championship game participant; Rankings from AP Poll

2018 Big 12 Conference football standings
	Conf.			Overall
Team	W		L	W		L
No. 4 Oklahoma y$^	8	–	1	12	–	2
No. 9 Texas y	7	–	2	10	–	4
Iowa State	6	–	3	8	–	5
No. 20 West Virginia	6	–	3	8	–	4
TCU	4	–	5	7	–	6
Baylor	4	–	5	7	–	6
Oklahoma State	3	–	6	7	–	6
Kansas State	3	–	6	5	–	7
Texas Tech	3	–	6	5	–	7
Kansas	1	–	8	3	–	9
Championship: Oklahoma 39, Texas 27
^ – College Football Playoff participant; $ – Conference champion; y – Championship game participant; Rankings from AP Poll

2019 Big 12 Conference football standings
	Conf.			Overall
Team	W		L	W		L
No. 7 Oklahoma y$^	8	–	1	12	–	2
No. 13 Baylor y	8	–	1	11	–	3
No. 25 Texas	5	–	4	8	–	5
Oklahoma State	5	–	4	8	–	5
Kansas State	5	–	4	8	–	5
Iowa State	5	–	4	7	–	6
West Virginia	3	–	6	5	–	7
TCU	3	–	6	5	–	7
Texas Tech	2	–	7	4	–	8
Kansas	1	–	8	3	–	9
Championship: Oklahoma 30, Baylor 23 ^{OT}
^ – College Football Playoff participant; $ – Conference champion; y – Championship game participant; Rankings from AP Poll

=== 2020-present ===
2020 Big 12 Conference football standings
	Conf.			Overall
Team	W		L	W		L
No. 9 Iowa State y	8	–	1	9	–	3
No. 6 Oklahoma y$	6	–	2	9	–	2
No. 20 Oklahoma State	6	–	3	8	–	3
No. 19 Texas	5	–	3	7	–	3
TCU	5	–	4	6	–	4
West Virginia	4	–	4	6	–	4
Kansas State	4	–	5	4	–	6
Texas Tech	3	–	6	4	–	6
Baylor	2	–	7	2	–	7
Kansas	0	–	8	0	–	9
Championship: Oklahoma 27, Iowa State 21
$ – Conference champion; y – Championship game participant; Rankings from AP Poll.

2021 Big 12 Conference football standings
	Conf.			Overall
Team	W		L	W		L
No. 7 Oklahoma State y	8	–	1	12	–	2
No. 5 Baylor y$	7	–	2	12	–	2
No. 10 Oklahoma	7	–	2	11	–	2
Iowa State	5	–	4	7	–	6
Kansas State	4	–	5	8	–	5
West Virginia	4	–	5	6	–	7
Texas	3	–	6	5	–	7
TCU	3	–	6	5	–	7
Texas Tech	3	–	6	7	–	6
Kansas	1	–	8	2	–	10
Championship: Baylor 21, Oklahoma State 16
$ – Conference champion; y – Championship game participant; Rankings from AP Poll

2022 Big 12 Conference football standings
	Conf.			Overall
Team	W		L	W		L
No. 2 TCU y^	9	–	0	13	–	2
No. 14 Kansas State y$	7	–	2	10	–	4
No. 25 Texas	6	–	3	8	–	5
Texas Tech	5	–	4	8	–	5
Oklahoma State	4	–	5	7	–	6
Baylor	4	–	5	6	–	7
Oklahoma	3	–	6	6	–	7
Kansas	3	–	6	6	–	7
West Virginia	3	–	6	5	–	7
Iowa State	1	–	8	4	–	8
Championship: Kansas State 31, TCU 28^{OT}
^ – College Football Playoff participant; $ – Conference champion; y – Championship game participant; Rankings from AP Poll

2023 Big 12 Conference football standings
	Conf.			Overall
Team	W		L	W		L
No. 3 Texas y$^	8	–	1	12	–	2
No. 16 Oklahoma State y	7	–	2	10	–	4
No. 15 Oklahoma	7	–	2	10	–	3
Iowa State	6	–	3	7	–	6
No. 18 Kansas State	6	–	3	9	–	4
West Virginia	6	–	3	9	–	4
Texas Tech	5	–	4	7	–	6
No. 23 Kansas	5	–	4	9	–	4
UCF	3	–	6	6	–	7
TCU	3	–	6	5	–	7
Houston	2	–	7	4	–	8
BYU	2	–	7	5	–	7
Baylor	2	–	7	3	–	9
Cincinnati	1	–	8	3	–	9
Championship: Texas 49, Oklahoma State 21
^ – College Football Playoff participant; $ – Conference champion; y – Championship game participant; Rankings from AP Poll

2024 Big 12 Conference football standings
	Conf.			Overall
Team	W		L	W		L
No. 7 Arizona State y$^	7	–	2	11	–	3
No. 15 Iowa State y	7	–	2	11	–	3
No. 13 BYU	7	–	2	11	–	2
No. 25 Colorado	7	–	2	9	–	4
Baylor	6	–	3	8	–	5
TCU	6	–	3	9	–	4
Texas Tech	6	–	3	8	–	5
Kansas State	5	–	4	9	–	4
West Virginia	5	–	4	6	–	7
Kansas	4	–	5	5	–	7
Cincinnati	3	–	6	5	–	7
Houston	3	–	6	4	–	8
Utah	2	–	7	5	–	7
UCF	2	–	7	4	–	8
Arizona	2	–	7	4	–	8
Oklahoma State	0	–	9	3	–	9
Championship: Arizona State 45, Iowa State 19
^ – College Football Playoff participant; $ – Conference champion; y – Championship game participant; Rankings from AP Poll

2025 Big 12 Conference football standings
	Conf.			Overall
Team	W		L	W		L
Arizona	0	–	0	0	–	0
Arizona State	0	–	0	0	–	0
Baylor	0	–	0	0	–	0
BYU	0	–	0	0	–	0
Cincinnati	0	–	0	0	–	0
Colorado	0	–	0	0	–	0
Houston	0	–	0	0	–	0
Iowa State	0	–	0	0	–	0
Kansas	0	–	0	0	–	0
Kansas State	0	–	0	0	–	0
Oklahoma State	0	–	0	0	–	0
TCU	0	–	0	0	–	0
Texas Tech	0	–	0	0	–	0
UCF	0	–	0	0	–	0
Utah	0	–	0	0	–	0
West Virginia	0	–	0	0	–	0
Championship: December 6, 2025
^ – College Football Playoff participant; $ – Conference champion; y – Championship game participant; As of April 9, 2025; Rankings from CFP Rankings
