= Rout 66 (college football game) =

1997 college football game in Texas, US

UCLA Bruins	Texas Longhorns
(0–2)	(1–0)
Pac-10	Big 12
66	3
Head coach: Bob Toledo	Head coach: John Mackovic
	AP 11
	1	2	3	4	Total
UCLA	10	28	7	21	66
Texas	0	0	3	0	3
- Date: September 13, 1997
- Season: 1997
- Stadium: Darrell K Royal Texas Memorial Stadium
- Location: Austin, Texas
- Attendance: 77,203

United States TV coverage
- Network: ABC

Rout 66 is the nickname commonly ascribed to a 1997 college football game between the Texas Longhorns and the UCLA Bruins. The Bruins, coached by Bob Toledo, defeated the Longhorns, coached by John Mackovic and ranked #11 in the Associated Press poll at the time, by a final score of 66-3 at Darrell K Royal-Texas Memorial Stadium in Austin, Texas. In terms of margin of defeat, it is the second-worst loss, and the worst home loss, in the history of Texas football. Additionally, it was, at the time, the worst loss for a ranked team in the 61 years that the AP poll had been in place.

For UCLA, which had lost its first two games entering the contest against UT, the win served as a springboard to a ten-game winning streak that included a Pac-10 Conference championship, a Cotton Bowl championship, and a final ranking of #5 in the AP poll.

For Texas, "Rout 66" effectively derailed the rest of the season, as the team went on to post a 4-7 record, including a 2-6 mark in the Big 12 Conference, of which UT was a member at the time. It also marked the beginning of the end of the tenure of Mackovic, who was fired at the end of the season.
