= 1997 Alamo Bowl =

1997 Builders Square Alamo Bowl
- Fifth edition
| Purdue Boilermakers | Oklahoma State Cowboys |
| (8–3) | (8–3) |
| Big Ten | Big 12 |
| 33 | 20 |
| Head coach: Joe Tiller | Head coach: Bob Simmons |
| AP / Coaches / BA; 17 / 16 / 16 | AP / Coaches / BA; 24 / 24 / 24 |
| | 1 | 2 | 3 | 4 | Total |
|---|---|---|---|---|---|
| Purdue | 7 | 3 | 20 | 3 | 33 |
| Oklahoma State | 3 | 3 | 7 | 7 | 20 |
- Date: December 30, 1997
- Season: 1997
- Stadium: Alamodome
- Location: San Antonio, Texas
- MVP: Billy Dicken (QB, Purdue); Adrian Beasley (S, Purdue)
- Favorite: Purdue by 3.5
- Referee: Bill Goss (SEC)
- Attendance: 55,552

United States TV coverage
- Network: ESPN
- Announcers: ESPN: Mike Tirico (play-by-play), Todd Blackledge (analyst) and Jerry Punch (sideline)

The 1997 Alamo Bowl featured the Purdue Boilermakers, and the Oklahoma State Cowboys.

Oklahoma State took an early 3–0 lead on a field goal. Purdue responded with an 18-yard touchdown pass from Billy Dicken, to take a 7–3 lead. The teams traded field goals before half time, and Purdue led 10–6 at halftime.

In the second half, quarterback Billy Dicken rushed one yard for a touchdown increasing Purdue's lead to 17–6. Running back Jamaal Fobbs sprinted 21 yards for a touchdown pulling OSU to within 17–13. Wide receiver Vinny Sutherland changed the momentum by running for a 19-yard touchdown, extending Purdue's lead to 24–13. Billy Dicken threw a 69-yard touchdown pass to Chris Daniels making the score 30–13. Purdue added a field goal to make the margin 33–13. Oklahoma State scored before the end of the game to make the final 33–20.
