= 1997 NCAA Division I-A football season =

American college football season

1997 NCAA Division I-A season
- Number of teams: 112
- Preseason AP No. 1: Penn State

Postseason
- Duration: December 20, 1997 – January 2, 1998
- Bowl games: 20
- AP Poll No. 1: Michigan
- Coaches Poll No. 1: Nebraska
- Heisman Trophy: Michigan cornerback Charles Woodson

Bowl Alliance Championship
- 1998 Orange Bowl
- Site: Pro Player Stadium; Miami Gardens, Florida
- Champion(s): Michigan (AP poll, NFF, FWAA); Nebraska (Coaches poll)

Division I-A football seasons
- ← 1996 1998 →

The 1997 NCAA Division I-A football season, play of college football in the United States organized by the National Collegiate Athletic Association at the Division I-A level, began in late summer 1997 and culminated with the major bowl games in early January 1998. The national championship was split for the third time in the 1990s. The Michigan Wolverines finished the season atop the AP Poll after completing a 12–0 campaign with a Big Ten Conference championship and a victory in the Rose Bowl over Washington State, and the Nebraska Cornhuskers garnered the top ranking in the Coaches' Poll with a 13–0 record, a Big 12 Conference championship, and a win over Tennessee in the Orange Bowl.

Michigan and Heisman Trophy winner Charles Woodson were given the AP Sports Writers National Championship. Michigan's Charles Woodson, who played primarily at cornerback, but also saw time on offense as a wide receiver and on special teams as a punt returner, won the Heisman Trophy, becoming the first primarily defensive player to win the award. The 1997 season was the third and final season in which the major bowl games were organized under the Bowl Alliance system. The Bowl Championship Series was instituted the following year.

The Michigan Wolverines finished the season atop the AP Poll after completing a 12–0 campaign with a Big Ten Conference championship and a victory in the Rose Bowl over Washington State. Michigan was also crowned as National Champions by the National Football Foundation and the Football Writers Association of America. In Tom Osborne's last season as head coach, Nebraska took over the No. 1 ranking in the nation after defeating Texas Tech midway through the season. Three weeks later, Nebraska slipped to a No. 3 ranking in both polls, as voters weren't impressed by the way the Cornhuskers won their game against an unranked Missouri team (a controversial kicked ball was caught for the game-tying TD as time expired in regulation, leading to a 45-38 overtime win). Michigan moved to No. 1 in the AP Poll after its 34–8 victory over previously No. 2 ranked Penn State, while the Coaches Poll selected Florida State as No. 1 due to their 20-3 win over previously No. 5 North Carolina.

Florida State went into their final regular season game undefeated and still ranked No. 1 in the Coaches Poll. However, Fred Taylor of Florida would run for 162 yards and four touchdowns on the nation's top-ranked run defense, one of those touchdowns being the winning score with less than two minutes to play. This game is commonly referred to as "The Greatest Game Ever Played in the Swamp".

Meanwhile, undefeated No. 1 Nebraska squared off in the 1998 Orange Bowl versus the No. 3 ranked Tennessee Volunteers. The Cornhuskers made a point of smacking down Tennessee as they defeated the Volunteers 42–17. Unusually for the low-key Osborne and his straight-ahead team, after the game he campaigned openly for Nebraska to be named the consensus national champion (Grant Wistrom stated that if "they wanted to give it to Michigan because they haven't won one in 50 years, we don't want it anyway.").

After the bowl games, the coaches poll awarded the national championship to Nebraska, and the AP Poll awarded the national championship to Michigan, giving Osborne his third national title in four seasons to cap his career. This also marked the last time that a Big 10 (or Pac-10) team would be bound to play in the Rose Bowl instead of heading to a No. 1-No. 2 title game, due to the 1998 BCS realignment.

The Humanitarian Bowl, now known as the Famous Idaho Potato Bowl, began play in Boise, Idaho to help publicise the dwindling Big West Conference and Boise State. The Broncos with their blue turf had just made the jump to Division I-A a year earlier. The Big West champion had formerly gone to the Las Vegas Bowl, but the now only 6 team conference wasn't much of a seat filler.

The Motor City Bowl, now the Little Caesars Pizza Bowl, began play in Detroit hosted by a MAC team.

The Copper Bowl gained corporate sponsorship and was now known as the Insight.com Bowl; it is now known as the Cactus Bowl.

The MAC also grew to a 12-team, two-division conference with a championship game after the return of two former MAC members—Northern Illinois, returning from the independent ranks, and Marshall, moving up from Division I-AA. Marshall's addition increased the number of teams in Division I-A to 112. In a scenario similar to the Big West in 1992, this up-and-comer from I-AA was able to win its division and the inaugural conference championship game in its first year. The Thundering Herd had gone unbeaten and won the I-AA national title the previous season, and had future NFL stars Randy Moss and Chad Pennington.

== Rule changes ==
- Starting with the third overtime period, teams must go for a two-point conversion after a touchdown.
- Strengthened the enforcement of chop blocks.
- Charged teams with a time-out if a player is not wearing their mouth guard. If a team is out of time-outs when the infraction occurs, a five-yard penalty is assessed.
- Changed the penalty for roughing the punt receiver to 15 yards if he is contacted by a defender within six feet after catching the ball.
- Requiring the game clock be started once the ball is kicked on kickoffs and free kicks after safeties except in the final 2:00 of each half.
- The clock for halftime was to be started immediately following the conclusion of the second quarter. Previously, the clock did not start until all participants had cleared the field and the referee signaled the timekeeper to start the clock.
- The officials' uniforms now include a letter on the back showing their position ("R" for Referee, "U" for Umpire, "H" for Head Linesman, etc.). The Big Eight Conference was the first to require this in the mid-1980s, followed shortly thereafter by the Southwest Conference and the Pacific-10 Conference. The Atlantic Coast Conference, Big Ten Conference and Southeastern Conference did not require this until the NCAA made it mandatory.

== Conference and program changes ==
One team upgraded from Division I-AA prior to the season. As such, the total number of Division I-A schools increased again, from 111 to 112.

- The MAC added two new members, independent (and former member) Northern Illinois and Division I-AA power Marshall, to expand to 12 teams. The league subsequently formed two divisions and added a league championship game.
- East Carolina joined a conference for the first time since Division I split in 1978, becoming a member of Conference USA.

School	1996 Conference	1997 Conference
Marshall Thundering Herd	Southern (I-AA)	MAC (I-A)
Northern Illinois Huskies	I-A Independent	MAC
East Carolina Pirates	I-A Independent	Conference USA

== Regular season ==
=== August–September ===
The preseason AP Poll listed Penn State as the top team, followed by No. 2 Florida, No. 3 Florida State, No. 4 Washington, and No. 5 Tennessee. Foreshadowing a year with a lack of consensus at the top, the Coaches Poll selected Florida rather than Penn State as their No. 1 club.

August 30: No. 2 Florida defeated Southern Mississippi 21–6 and No. 5 Tennessee won 52–17 over Texas Tech. The other top teams had not begun their schedules, and the next AP Poll featured No. 1 Penn State, No. 2 Florida, No. 3 Tennessee, No. 4 Washington, and No. 5 Florida State.

September 6: No. 1 Penn State defeated rival Pittsburgh 34–17, No. 2 Florida overwhelmed Central Michigan 82–6, No. 3 Tennessee staved off a UCLA comeback for a 30–24 victory, No. 4 Washington won 42–20 at No. 19 Brigham Young, and No. 5 Florida State used a late 97-yard touchdown drive to beat No. 23 USC 14–7. The next AP Poll featured No. 1 Penn State, No. 2 Florida, No. 3 Washington, No. 4 Tennessee, and No. 5 Florida State.

September 13: No. 1 Penn State dominated Temple 52–10. No. 2 Florida was idle. No. 3 Washington continued to move up with a 36–3 defeat of San Diego State, No. 4 Tennessee was also idle, and No. 5 Florida State crushed Maryland 50–7. The next AP Poll featured No. 1 Penn State, No. 2 Washington, No. 3 Florida, No. 4 Tennessee, and No. 5 Florida State.

September 20: No. 1 Penn State won 57–21 at Louisville, but No. 2 Washington fell 27–14 to No. 7 Nebraska. No. 3 Florida and No. 4 Tennessee squared off in Gainesville, where the defending champs prevailed 33–20; Volunteers quarterback Peyton Manning finished his career winless against the Gators in four tries. Peter Warrick had 249 receiving yards as No. 5 Florida State beat No. 16 Clemson 35–28, while conference rival No. 6 North Carolina won 40–14 at Maryland. Florida now took over the No. 1 spot in both polls, and they were followed in the AP rankings by No. 2 Penn State, No. 3 Nebraska, No. 4 Florida State, and No. 5 North Carolina.

September 27: No. 1 Florida won 55–28 at Kentucky. No. 2 Penn State, No. 3 Nebraska, and No. 4 Florida State were all idle, while No. 5 North Carolina defeated Virginia 48–20. The top five remained the same.

=== October ===
October 4: All of the highly-ranked teams won easily. No. 1 Florida blew out Arkansas 56–7, No. 2 Penn State was almost as dominant with a 41–6 victory at Illinois, No. 3 Nebraska hosted No. 17 Kansas State for a 56–26 win, No. 4 Florida State shut out rival Miami 47–0, and No. 5 North Carolina beat Texas Christian 31–10 on the road. The top five again remained the same.

October 11: No. 1 Florida was upset 28–21 by No. 14 LSU. No. 2 Penn State returned to the top spot with a 31–27 comeback win over No. 7 Ohio State. No. 3 Nebraska won 49–21 at Baylor, No. 4 Florida State visited Duke for a 51–27 victory, No. 5 North Carolina beat Wake Forest 30–12, and No. 6 Michigan defeated Northwestern 23–6. The next poll featured No. 1 Penn State, No. 2 Nebraska, No. 3 Florida State, No. 4 North Carolina, and No. 5 Michigan.

October 18: After trailing 15–3 in the fourth quarter, No. 1 Penn State scored two late touchdowns to escape mediocre Minnesota by a 16–15 score. No. 2 Nebraska was more impressive in a 29–0 shutout of Texas Tech. No. 3 Florida State also held their opponent scoreless, winning 38–0 over No. 21 Georgia Tech. No. 4 North Carolina won 20–7 at North Carolina State, and No. 5 Michigan made a late comeback of their own in a 28–24 defeat of No. 15 Iowa. Nebraska took over the No. 1 spot in both polls by a very close margin, followed by No. 2 Penn State, No. 3 Florida State, No. 4 North Carolina, and No. 5 Michigan.

October 25: No. 1 Nebraska posted their second straight shutout, 35–0 at Kansas. No. 2 Penn State was idle. No. 3 Florida State won 47–21 at Virginia. No. 4 North Carolina was also idle, while No. 5 Michigan posted a 23–7 defeat of No. 15 Michigan State. With their second straight win over a ranked opponent, the Wolverines moved up in the next poll: No. 1 Nebraska, No. 2 Penn State, No. 3 Florida State, No. 4 Michigan, and No. 5 North Carolina.

=== November ===
October 30–November 1: No. 1 Nebraska overwhelmed rival Oklahoma 69–7. No. 2 Penn State had another close call, winning 30–27 at Northwestern. No. 3 Florida State defeated North Carolina State 48–35, No. 4 Michigan beat Minnesota 24–3, and No. 5 North Carolina held off Georgia Tech 16–13. The top five remained the same in the next poll.

November 8: In the "Flea Kicker" game, No. 1 Nebraska trailed Missouri 38–31 with seven seconds left. Cornhuskers quarterback Scott Frost launched a pass which bounced off the receiver's chest, off a Missouri defender's foot, off a Nebraska player's leg, and finally into the arms of Nebraska's Matt Davison for a game-tying touchdown. The Cornhuskers came away with a 45–38 overtime victory. Meanwhile, No. 2 Penn State fell 34–8 to No. 4 Michigan and No. 3 Florida State won 20–3 at No. 5 North Carolina. No. 7 Ohio State blew out Minnesota 31–3, while No. 8 Tennessee beat No. 24 Southern Mississippi 44–20. After Nebraska's struggles and Michigan and Florida State's triumphs, both polls elevated new teams to the top. The AP's top five were No. 1 Michigan, No. 2 Florida State, No. 3 Nebraska, No. 4 Ohio State, and No. 5 Tennessee, while the Coaches Poll ranked Florida State in the top spot.

November 15: No. 1 Michigan won 26–16 at No. 23 Wisconsin, No. 2 Florida State blew out Wake Forest 58–7 to clinch the outright ACC title, No. 3 Nebraska destroyed Iowa State 77–14 to earn a spot in the Big 12 championship game, No. 4 Ohio State beat Illinois 41–6, and No. 5 Tennessee won 30–22 at Arkansas. The top five remained the same in the next poll.

November 22: No. 1 Michigan faced off against No. 4 Ohio State with the opportunity to clinch the Big Ten title and a Rose Bowl berth. Three times in the past four years, Ohio State had entered their rivalry game undefeated only to be tripped up by the Wolverines. This time Michigan was the one with a perfect record, and they continued their winning streak over the Buckeyes with a 20–14 victory. In another rivalry game, No. 2 Florida State visited No. 10 Florida hoping to conclude an undefeated season of their own. In a back-and-forth contest with seven lead changes, Doug Johnson's 63-yard pass set up a 1-yard touchdown run by Fred Taylor for a 32–29 Gators victory. No. 3 Nebraska was idle. No. 5 Tennessee won 59–31 at Kentucky to lock up the SEC Eastern Division title. No. 6 Penn State, whose Rose Bowl hopes were dashed by Michigan's win, beat No. 24 Wisconsin 35–10. Michigan now held the No. 1 spot in both polls, followed by No. 2 Nebraska, No. 3 Tennessee, No. 4 Penn State, and No. 5 Florida State.

November 29: No. 1 Michigan had finished their schedule. No. 2 Nebraska held off a late Colorado comeback for a 27–24 win. No. 3 Tennessee got past Vanderbilt 17–10. No. 4 Penn State lost 49–14 at Michigan State. No. 5 Florida State and No. 6 UCLA had finished their schedules, but both teams moved up in the next poll: No. 1 Michigan, No. 2 Nebraska, No. 3 Tennessee, No. 4 Florida State, and No. 5 UCLA.

=== December ===
December 6: No. 2 Nebraska annihilated No. 14 Texas A&M in the Big 12 Championship Game, leading 47–3 in the fourth quarter and coming away with a 54–15 victory to enter bowl season undefeated. No. 3 Tennessee had a much harder time in the SEC Championship Game against No. 11 Auburn, but Peyton Manning threw for 373 yards and four touchdowns, including a 73-yard pass in the fourth quarter which made the difference in the Volunteers' 30–29 win. With all other teams having finished their schedules, the top five remained the same in the next poll.

For the third time in four years, the Big Ten and Pac-10's contract with the Rose Bowl prevented the only two undefeated teams in the nation from meeting in a bowl game. Since No. 1 Michigan was obligated to play the Pac-10 champion (No. 8 Washington State) in Pasadena, No. 2 Nebraska's Orange Bowl opponent would be one-loss No. 3 Tennessee. Among other major bowls, the Sugar would match No. 4 Florida State up against No. 9 Ohio State, the Cotton would feature No. 5 UCLA and No. 20 Texas A&M, and the Fiesta would pit No. 10 Kansas State against the Big East champ, No. 14 Syracuse.

== Conference standings ==
1997 Atlantic Coast Conference football standings
	Conf.			Overall
Team	W		L	W		L
No. 3 Florida State $	8	–	0	11	–	1
No. 6 North Carolina	7	–	1	11	–	1
Virginia	5	–	3	7	–	4
No. 25 Georgia Tech	5	–	3	7	–	5
Clemson	4	–	4	7	–	5
NC State	3	–	5	6	–	5
Wake Forest	3	–	5	5	–	6
Maryland	1	–	7	2	–	9
Duke	0	–	8	2	–	9
$ – Conference champion; Rankings from AP Poll

1997 Big 12 Conference football standings
	Conf.			Overall
Team	W		L	W		L
North Division
No. 2 Nebraska † xy$	8	–	0	13	–	0
No. 8 Kansas State %	7	–	1	11	–	1
No. 23 Missouri	5	–	3	7	–	5
Colorado	3	–	5	5	–	6
Kansas	3	–	5	5	–	6
Iowa State	1	–	7	1	–	10
South Division
No. 20 Texas A&M xy	6	–	2	9	–	4
No. 24 Oklahoma State	5	–	3	8	–	4
Texas Tech	5	–	3	6	–	5
Texas	2	–	6	4	–	7
Oklahoma	2	–	6	4	–	8
Baylor	1	–	7	2	–	9
Championship: Nebraska 54, Texas A&M 15
x – Division champion/co-champions; y – Championship game participant; † – Coaches Poll national champion $ – Bowl Alliance representative as champion % – Bowl Alliance at-large representative; Rankings from AP Poll

1997 Big East Conference football standings
	Conf.			Overall
Team	W		L	W		L
No. 21 Syracuse $	6	–	1	9	–	4
Virginia Tech	5	–	2	7	–	5
Pittsburgh	4	–	3	6	–	6
West Virginia	4	–	3	7	–	5
Miami (FL)	3	–	4	5	–	6
Temple	3	–	4	3	–	8
Boston College	3	–	4	4	–	7
Rutgers	0	–	7	0	–	11
$ – Conference champion; Rankings from AP Poll

1997 Big Ten Conference football standings
	Conf.			Overall
Team	W		L	W		L
No. 1 Michigan $	8	–	0	12	–	0
No. 12 Ohio State	6	–	2	10	–	3
No. 16 Penn State	6	–	2	9	–	3
No. 15 Purdue	6	–	2	9	–	3
Wisconsin	5	–	3	8	–	5
Iowa	4	–	4	7	–	5
Michigan State	4	–	4	7	–	5
Northwestern	3	–	5	5	–	7
Minnesota	1	–	7	3	–	9
Indiana	1	–	7	2	–	9
Illinois	0	–	8	0	–	11
$ – Conference champion; Rankings from AP Poll

1997 Big West Conference football standings
	Conf.			Overall
Team	W		L	W		L
Utah State +	4	–	1	6	–	6
Nevada +	4	–	1	5	–	6
Boise State	3	–	2	5	–	6
Idaho	2	–	3	5	–	6
North Texas	2	–	3	4	–	7
New Mexico State	0	–	5	2	–	9
+ – Conference co-champions

1997 Conference USA football standings
	Conf.			Overall
Team	W		L	W		L
No. 19 Southern Miss $	6	–	0	9	–	3
Tulane	5	–	1	7	–	4
East Carolina	4	–	2	5	–	6
Cincinnati	2	–	4	8	–	4
Memphis	2	–	4	4	–	7
Houston	2	–	4	3	–	8
Louisville	0	–	6	1	–	10
$ – Conference champion; Rankings from AP Poll

1997 Mid-American Conference football standings
	Conf.			Overall
Team	W		L	W		L
East Division
Marshall x$	7	–	1	10	–	3
Miami (OH)	6	–	2	8	–	3
Ohio	6	–	2	8	–	3
Bowling Green	3	–	5	3	–	8
Kent State	3	–	5	3	–	8
Akron	2	–	7	2	–	9
West Division
Toledo x	7	–	1	9	–	3
Western Michigan	6	–	2	8	–	3
Ball State	4	–	4	5	–	6
Eastern Michigan	4	–	5	4	–	7
Central Michigan	1	–	7	2	–	9
Northern Illinois	0	–	8	0	–	11
Championship: Marshall 34, Toledo 14
$ – Conference champion; x – Division champion/co-champions

1997 Pacific-10 Conference football standings
	Conf.			Overall
Team	W		L	W		L
No. 9 Washington State +	7	–	1	10	–	2
No. 5 UCLA +	7	–	1	10	–	2
No. 14 Arizona State	6	–	2	9	–	3
No. 18 Washington	5	–	3	8	–	4
Arizona	4	–	4	7	–	5
USC	4	–	4	6	–	5
Oregon	3	–	5	7	–	5
Stanford	3	–	5	5	–	6
California	1	–	7	3	–	8
Oregon State	0	–	8	3	–	8
+ – Conference co-champions; Rankings from AP Poll

1997 Southeastern Conference football standings
	Conf.			Overall
Team	W		L	W		L
Eastern Division
No. 7 Tennessee x$	7	–	1	11	–	2
No. 10 Georgia	6	–	2	10	–	2
No. 4 Florida	6	–	2	10	–	2
South Carolina	3	–	5	5	–	6
Kentucky	2	–	6	5	–	6
Vanderbilt	0	–	8	3	–	8
Western Division
No. 11 Auburn xy	6	–	2	10	–	3
No. 13 LSU x	6	–	2	9	–	3
No. 22 Ole Miss	4	–	4	8	–	4
Mississippi State	4	–	4	7	–	4
Arkansas	2	–	6	4	–	7
Alabama	2	–	6	4	–	7
Championship: Tennessee 30, Auburn 29
$ – Conference champion; x – Division champion/co-champions; Rankings from AP Poll

1997 Western Athletic Conference football standings
	Conf.			Overall
Team	W		L	W		L
Mountain Division
New Mexico x	6	–	2	9	–	4
Rice	5	–	3	7	–	4
SMU	5	–	3	6	–	5
Utah	5	–	3	6	–	5
BYU	4	–	4	6	–	5
UTEP	3	–	5	4	–	7
Tulsa	2	–	6	2	–	9
TCU	1	–	7	1	–	10
Pacific Division
No. 17 Colorado State x$	7	–	1	11	–	2
Air Force	6	–	2	10	–	3
Fresno State	5	–	3	6	–	6
Wyoming	4	–	4	7	–	6
San Diego State	4	–	4	5	–	7
San Jose State	4	–	4	4	–	7
UNLV	2	–	6	3	–	8
Hawaii	1	–	7	3	–	9
Championship: Colorado State 41, New Mexico 13
$ – Conference champion; x – Division champion/co-champions; Rankings from AP Poll

1997 NCAA Division I-A independents football records
	Conf.			Overall
Team	W		L	W		L
Louisiana Tech		–		9	–	2
Navy		–		7	–	4
Notre Dame		–		7	–	6
UAB		–		5	–	6
UCF		–		5	–	6
Northeast Louisiana		–		5	–	7
Army		–		4	–	7
Arkansas State		–		2	–	9
Southwestern Louisiana		–		1	–	10
Rankings from AP Poll

== I-AA team wins over I-A teams ==
Italics denotes I-AA teams.

Date	Visiting team	Home team	Site	Result	Attendance	Ref.
August 30	Cal State Northridge	Boise State	Bronco Stadium • Boise, Idaho	V 63–23 (vacated)	26,824	
September 6	Kent State	No. 9 (I-AA) Youngstown State	Stambaugh Stadium • Youngstown, Ohio	23–44	17,974	
October 4	Cal Poly	New Mexico State	Aggie Memorial Stadium • Las Cruces, New Mexico	38–35 ^{OT}		
November 1	Idaho	No. 11 (I-AA) Eastern Washington	Joe Albi Stadium • Spokane, Washington	21–24	7,756	
^{#}Rankings from AP Poll released prior to game.

== AP Poll progress ==
WEEK	No. 1	No. 2	No. 3	Event
PRE-1	Penn State+	Florida	Florida State	
2	Penn State+	Florida	Tennessee	
3	Penn State+	Florida	Washington+	
4	Penn State+	Washington+	Florida	
5-7	Florida	Penn State+	Nebraska	
8	Penn State+	Nebraska	Florida State	
9-11	Nebraska	Penn State+	Florida State	
12-13	Michigan+	Florida State	Nebraska	
14-16	Michigan+	Nebraska	Tennessee	

+Penn State and Michigan were Big Ten teams, and Washington was a Pac-10 team. The Big Ten and Pac-10 conferences played in the Rose Bowl rather than the Bowl Alliance championship game.

== Bowl games ==
BOWL					Location
Rose Bowl	No. 1 Michigan	21	No. 8 Washington State	16	Pasadena
Orange Bowl	No. 2 Nebraska	42	No. 3 Tennessee	17	Miami
Sugar Bowl	No. 4 Florida State	31	No. 9 Ohio State	14	New Orleans
Cotton Bowl Classic	No. 5 UCLA	29	No. 20 Texas A&M	23	Dallas
Florida Citrus Bowl	No. 6 Florida	21	No. 11 Penn State	6	Orlando
Gator Bowl	No. 7 North Carolina	42	Virginia Tech	3	Jacksonville
Fiesta Bowl	No. 10 Kansas State	35	No. 14 Syracuse	18	Tempe, Arizona
Outback Bowl	No. 12 Georgia	33	Wisconsin	6	Tampa
Peach Bowl	No. 13 Auburn	21	Clemson	17	Atlanta
Independence Bowl	No. 15 LSU	27	Notre Dame	9	Shreveport
Sun Bowl	No. 16 Arizona State	17	Iowa	7	El Paso
Alamo Bowl	No. 17 Purdue	33	No. 24 Oklahoma State	20	San Antonio
Holiday Bowl	No. 18 Colorado State	35	No. 20 Missouri	24	San Diego
Aloha Bowl	No. 21 Washington	51	Michigan St	23	Honolulu
Liberty Bowl	No. 22 Southern Mississippi	41	Pittsburgh	7	Memphis
Carquest Bowl	No. 25 Georgia Tech	35	West Virginia	30	Miami
Insight.com Bowl	Arizona	20	New Mexico	14	Tucson, Arizona
Las Vegas Bowl	Oregon	41	Air Force	13	Las Vegas
Motor City Bowl	Mississippi	34	Marshall	31	Detroit
Humanitarian Bowl	Cincinnati	35	Utah State	19	Boise

== Final AP Poll ==
1. Michigan
2. Nebraska
3. Florida State
4. Florida
5. UCLA
6. North Carolina
7. Tennessee
8. Kansas St.
9. Washington St.
10. Georgia
11. Auburn
12. Ohio St.
13. LSU
14. Arizona St.
15. Purdue
16. Penn St.
17. Colorado St.
18. Washington
19. So. Mississippi
20. Texas A&M
21. Syracuse
22. Mississippi
23. Missouri
24. Oklahoma St.
25. Georgia Tech

Others receiving votes: 26. Arizona; 27. Oregon; 28. Air Force; 29. Marshall; 30. Virginia; 31. Clemson; 32. Louisiana Tech; 33. Mississippi St.; 34. Michigan St.; 35. Wisconsin; 36. New Mexico; 37. Cincinnati; 38. Notre Dame; 39. Iowa; 40. Virginia Tech.

== Final Coaches Poll ==
1. Nebraska
2. Michigan
3. Florida State
4. North Carolina
5. UCLA
6. Florida
7. Kansas St.
8. Tennessee
9. Washington St.
10. Georgia
11. Auburn
12. Ohio St.
13. Louisiana St.
14. Arizona St.
15. Purdue
16. Colorado St.
17. Penn St.
18. Washington
19. Southern Mississippi
20. Syracuse
21. Texas A&M
22. Mississippi
23. Missouri
24. Oklahoma St.
25. Air Force

Others receiving votes: 26. Clemson (58); 27. Georgia Tech (55); 28. Iowa (32); 29. Louisiana Tech (31); 30. Oregon (25); 31. Cincinnati (24); 32. Arizona (23); 33. Mississippi St. (20); 34. Michigan St. (16); 35. New Mexico and Wisconsin (13); 37. Tulane (10); 38. Virginia (9); 39. West Virginia (7); 40. Marshall (4); 41. Notre Dame (1).

== Awards ==
=== Heisman Trophy voting ===
The Heisman Trophy is given to the year's most outstanding player

Player	School	Position	1st	2nd	3rd	Total
Charles Woodson	Michigan	CB	433	209	98	1,815
Peyton Manning	Tennessee	QB	281	263	174	1,543
Ryan Leaf	Washington State	QB	70	205	241	861
Randy Moss	Marshall	WR	17	56	90	253
Curtis Enis	Penn State	RB	3	18	20	65
Ricky Williams	Texas	RB	3	18	20	65
Tim Dwight	Iowa	WR	5	3	11	32
Cade McNown	UCLA	QB	0	7	12	26
Tim Couch	Kentucky	QB	0	5	12	22
Amos Zereoué	West Virginia	RB	3	1	10	21

=== Other major awards ===
- Maxwell Award (College Player of the Year) – Peyton Manning, Tennessee
- Walter Camp Award (Back) – Charles Woodson, Michigan
- Davey O'Brien Award (Quarterback) – Peyton Manning, Tennessee
- Johnny Unitas Golden Arm Award (Senior Quarterback) – Peyton Manning, Tennessee
- Doak Walker Award (Running Back) – Ricky Williams, Texas
- Fred Biletnikoff Award (Wide Receiver) – Randy Moss, Marshall
- Bronko Nagurski Trophy (Defensive Player) – Charles Woodson, Michigan
- Dick Butkus Award (Linebacker) – Andy Katzenmoyer, Ohio St.
- Lombardi Award (Lineman or Linebacker) – Grant Wistrom, Nebraska
- Outland Trophy (Interior Lineman) – Aaron Taylor, Nebraska
- Jim Thorpe Award (Defensive Back) – Charles Woodson, Michigan
- Lou Groza Award (Placekicker) – Martin Gramatica, Kansas State
- Paul "Bear" Bryant Award – Lloyd Carr, Michigan
- Football Writers Association of America Coach of the Year Award: Mike Price, Washington St.

== Statistical leaders ==
=== Rushing ===
The following players were the individual leaders in rushing during the 1997 NCA Division I-A season:

Rank	Player	Team	Games	Rushes	Yds	Avg	TD	Yds/ game
1	Ricky Williams	Texas	11	279	1893	6.8	25	172.1
2	Ahman Green	Nebraska	12	278	1877	6.8	22	156.4
3	Tavian Banks	Iowa	11	246	1639	6.7	17	149.0
4	Travis Prentice	Miami (OH)	11	296	1549	5.2	25	140.8
5	Amos Zereoue	West Virginia	10	264	1505	5.7	16	150.5
6	Ron Dayne	Wisconsin	10	249	1421	5.7	15	142.1
7	Chris McCoy	Navy	11	246	1370	5.6	20	124.5
8	Jamal Lewis	Tennessee	12	232	1364	5.9	7	113.7
9	Curtis Enis	Penn State	11	228	1363	6.0	19	123.9
10	Fred Taylor	Florida	11	214	1292	6.0	13	117.5
11	Dwayne Harris	Toledo	10	254	1278	5.0	10	127.8
12	Autry Denson	Notre Dame	12	264	1268	4.8	12	105.7
13	Robert Holcombe	Illinois	11	294	1253	4.3	4	113.9
14	Sedrick Irvin	Michigan State	11	231	1211	5.2	9	110.1
15	Saladin McCullough	Oregon	11	250	1193	4.8	8	108.5
16	Michael Black	Washington State	11	235	1157	4.9	11	105.2
17	Kevin Faulk	LSU	9	205	1144	5.6	15	127.1
18	De'Mond Parker	Oklahoma	12	194	1143	5.9	6	95.3
19	Skip Hicks	UCLA	11	227	1142	5.0	22	103.8
20	Tremayne Stephens	NC State	11	204	1142	5.6	10	103.8

== Attendances ==
Average home attendance top 3:

Rank	Team	Average
1	Michigan Wolverines	106,448
2	Tennessee Volunteers	106,538
3	Penn State Nittany Lions	97,086
