= 1997 Texas A&M Aggies football team =

American college football season

1997 Texas A&M Aggies football

Big 12 South Division champion

Big 12 Championship Game, L 15–54 vs. Nebraska

Cotton Bowl Classic, L 23–29 vs. UCLA
- Conference: Big 12 Conference
- South Division

Ranking
- Coaches: No. 21
- AP: No. 20
- Record: 9–4 (6–2 Big 12)
- Head coach: R. C. Slocum (9th season)
- Offensive coordinator: Steve Marshall (1st season)
- Offensive scheme: Pro-style
- Defensive coordinator: Mike Hankwitz (1st season)
- Base defense: 4–3
- Home stadium: Kyle Field

1997 Big 12 Conference football standings
| | Conf. | | | Overall |
| Team | W | | L | W | | L |
|---|---|---|---|---|---|---|
North Division
| No. 2 Nebraska † xy$ | 8 | – | 0 | 13 | – | 0 |
| No. 8 Kansas State % | 7 | – | 1 | 11 | – | 1 |
| No. 23 Missouri | 5 | – | 3 | 7 | – | 5 |
| Colorado | 3 | – | 5 | 5 | – | 6 |
| Kansas | 3 | – | 5 | 5 | – | 6 |
| Iowa State | 1 | – | 7 | 1 | – | 10 |
South Division
| No. 20 Texas A&M xy | 6 | – | 2 | 9 | – | 4 |
| No. 24 Oklahoma State | 5 | – | 3 | 8 | – | 4 |
| Texas Tech | 5 | – | 3 | 6 | – | 5 |
| Texas | 2 | – | 6 | 4 | – | 7 |
| Oklahoma | 2 | – | 6 | 4 | – | 8 |
| Baylor | 1 | – | 7 | 2 | – | 9 |
Championship: Nebraska 54, Texas A&M 15
x – Division champion/co-champions; y – Championship game participant; † – Coaches Poll national champion $ – Bowl Alliance representative as champion % – Bowl Alliance at-large representative; Rankings from AP Poll

The 1997 Texas A&M Aggies football team represented Texas A&M University as a member of the South Division of the Big 12 Conference during the 1997 NCAA Division I-A football season. Led by ninth-year head coach R. C. Slocum, the Aggies compiled an overall record of 9–4 with a mark of 6–2 in conference play, winning the Big 12's South Division title. Texas A&M advanced to the Big 12 Championship Game, where the Aggies lost to Nebraska. Texas A&M was then invited to the Cotton Bowl Classic, losing there to UCLA. The team played home games at Kyle Field in College Station, Texas.

== Schedule ==
| Date | Time | Opponent | Rank | Site | TV | Result | Attendance | Source |
|---|---|---|---|---|---|---|---|---|
| September 6 | 4:00 pm | Sam Houston State* | | Kyle Field; College Station, TX | | W 59–6 | 58,619 | |
| September 20 | 11:30 am | Southwestern Louisiana* | | Kyle Field; College Station, TX | FSN | W 66–0 | 61,081 | |
| September 27 | 2:30 pm | vs. North Texas* | No. 22 | Texas Stadium; Irving, TX | | W 36–10 | 42,224 | |
| October 4 | 2:30 pm | at No. 16 Colorado | No. 21 | Folsom Field; Boulder, CO | ABC | W 16–10 | 50,877 | |
| October 11 | 1:00 pm | Iowa State | No. 15 | Kyle Field; College Station, TX | | W 56–17 | 58,159 | |
| October 18 | 2:30 pm | at No. 20 Kansas State | No. 14 | KSU Stadium; Manhattan, KS | ABC | L 17–36 | 43,601 | |
| October 25 | 1:00 pm | at Texas Tech | No. 20 | Jones Stadium; Lubbock, TX (rivalry) | | L 13–16 | 50,513 | |
| November 1 | 6:00 pm | No. 19 Oklahoma State | No. 25 | Kyle Field; College Station, TX | FSN | W 28–25 ^{OT} | 60,776 | |
| November 8 | 1:00 pm | Baylor | No. 21 | Kyle Field; College Station, TX (Battle of the Brazos) | | W 38–10 | 64,006 | |
| November 15 | 6:00 pm | at Oklahoma | No. 18 | Oklahoma Memorial Stadium; Norman, OK | FSN | W 51–7 | 64,929 | |
| November 28 | 10:00 am | Texas | No. 15 | Kyle Field; College Station, TX (rivalry) | ABC | W 27–16 | 75,349 | |
| December 6 | 3:30 pm | vs. No. 2 Nebraska | No. 14 | Alamodome; San Antonio, TX (Big 12 Championship Game) | ABC | L 15–54 | 64,824 | |
| January 1 | 1:30 pm | vs. No. 5 UCLA* | No. 20 | Cotton Bowl; Dallas, TX (Cotton Bowl Classic) | CBS | L 23–29 | 59,215 | |
*Non-conference game; Rankings from AP Poll released prior to the game; All times are in Central time

== Rankings ==
Ranking movements Legend: ██ Increase in ranking ██ Decrease in ranking — = Not ranked
| | Week | | | | | | | | | | | | | | | | | |
| Poll | Pre | 1 | 2 | 3 | 4 | 5 | 6 | 7 | 8 | 9 | 10 | 11 | 12 | 13 | 14 | 15 | 16 | Final |
|---|---|---|---|---|---|---|---|---|---|---|---|---|---|---|---|---|---|---|
| AP | — | — | — | — | — | 22 | 21 | 15 | 14 | 20 | 25 | 21 | 18 | 16 | 15 | 14 | 20 | 20 |
| Coaches | — | | — | — | 22 | 18 | 18 | 13 | 14 | 21 | — | 21 | 18 | 16 | 15 | 14 | 19 | 21 |

== Game summaries ==
=== Sam Houston State ===
| | 1 | 2 | 3 | 4 | Total |
|---|---|---|---|---|---|
| Sam Houston St | 3 | 3 | 0 | 0 | 6 |
| Texas A&M | 7 | 10 | 28 | 14 | 59 |

=== Southwestern Louisiana ===
| | 1 | 2 | 3 | 4 | Total |
|---|---|---|---|---|---|
| Southwestern Louisiana | 0 | 0 | 0 | 0 | 0 |
| Texas A&M | 24 | 21 | 7 | 14 | 66 |

=== North Texas ===
| | 1 | 2 | 3 | 4 | Total |
|---|---|---|---|---|---|
| #22 Texas A&M | 10 | 0 | 10 | 16 | 36 |
| North Texas | 3 | 7 | 0 | 0 | 10 |

=== Colorado ===
| | 1 | 2 | 3 | 4 | Total |
|---|---|---|---|---|---|
| #21 Texas A&M | 0 | 6 | 10 | 0 | 16 |
| #16 Colorado | 3 | 0 | 0 | 7 | 10 |

=== Iowa State ===
| | 1 | 2 | 3 | 4 | Total |
|---|---|---|---|---|---|
| Iowa State | 3 | 7 | 7 | 0 | 17 |
| #15 Texas A&M | 21 | 21 | 7 | 7 | 56 |

=== Kansas State ===
| | 1 | 2 | 3 | 4 | Total |
|---|---|---|---|---|---|
| #14 Texas A&M | 0 | 3 | 7 | 7 | 17 |
| #20 Kansas State | 13 | 3 | 7 | 13 | 36 |

=== Texas Tech ===
| | 1 | 2 | 3 | 4 | Total |
|---|---|---|---|---|---|
| #20 Texas A&M | 3 | 3 | 0 | 7 | 13 |
| Texas Tech | 3 | 7 | 3 | 3 | 16 |

=== Oklahoma State ===
| | 1 | 2 | 3 | 4 | OT | Total |
|---|---|---|---|---|---|---|
| #19 Oklahoma State | 13 | 0 | 6 | 3 | 3 | 25 |
| #25 Texas A&M | 7 | 0 | 0 | 15 | 6 | 28 |

=== Baylor ===
| | 1 | 2 | 3 | 4 | Total |
|---|---|---|---|---|---|
| Baylor | 0 | 3 | 7 | 0 | 10 |
| #21 Texas A&M | 10 | 7 | 7 | 14 | 38 |

=== Oklahoma ===
| | 1 | 2 | 3 | 4 | Total |
|---|---|---|---|---|---|
| #18 Texas A&M | 17 | 17 | 17 | 0 | 51 |
| Oklahoma | 0 | 0 | 0 | 7 | 7 |

=== Texas ===
| | 1 | 2 | 3 | 4 | Total |
|---|---|---|---|---|---|
| Texas | 0 | 6 | 7 | 3 | 16 |
| #15 Texas A&M | 0 | 14 | 7 | 6 | 27 |

=== Nebraska ===
| | 1 | 2 | 3 | 4 | Total |
|---|---|---|---|---|---|
| #14 Texas A&M | 0 | 3 | 0 | 12 | 15 |
| #2 Nebraska | 16 | 21 | 3 | 14 | 54 |

=== UCLA (Cotton Bowl Classic) ===
| | 1 | 2 | 3 | 4 | Total |
|---|---|---|---|---|---|
| #5 UCLA | 0 | 7 | 14 | 8 | 29 |
| #20 Texas A&M | 7 | 9 | 7 | 0 | 23 |

1st quarter scoring: Texas A&M – Brandon Jennings 64-yard interception return after 19-yard return and lateral from Dat Nguyen (Kyle Bryant kick)

2nd quarter scoring: Texas A&M – Zerek Rollins tackled Cade McNown in end zone for safety; Texas A&M – Dante Hall 74-yard run (Bryant kick); UCLA – Jim McElroy 22-yard pass from McNown (Chris Sailer kick)

3rd quarter scoring: UCLA – Skip Hicks 41-yard pass from McNown (Sailer kick); Texas A&M – Chris Cole 43 run (Bryant kick); UCLA – McNown 20-yard run (Sailer kick)

4th quarter scoring: UCLA – Ryan Neufeld 5-yard run (McNown run)

== Roster ==
 1  MICHAEL JAMESON          DB
 3  KYLE BRYANT              PK
 4  THADD HARGETT            QB
 4  DELVIN WRIGHT            DB
 5  TOYA JONES               DB
 6  SHANE LECHLER.           QB-P
 7  BRANNDON STEWART         QB
 8  SIRR PARKER              RB
 9  DAT NGUYEN               LB
13  MICHAEL WILLIAMS         RB
15  RANDY MCCOWN             QB
16  AARON OLIVER             WR
17  TERENCE KITCHENS         PK
18  SEDRICK CURRY            DB
19  VAN GARDNER              WR
20  D'ANDRE HARDEMAN         RB
21  LAKE CAMPBELL            DB
23  JASON GLENN              DB
24  JAAMONT HUMPHREY         RB
25  MICHAEL JENNINGS         WR
27  JEFF WILSON              DB
28  TRENT DRIVER             LB
29  QUINTON BROWN            LB
30  BRANDON JENNINGS         DB
33  MARC BROYLES             RB
34  DANTE HALL               RB
35  Ben Henderson            LB
36  RONALD PATTON            DB
39  JASON WEBSTER            DB
40  ROYLIN BRADLEY           LB
42  CHRIS TAYLOR             WR
43  WARRICK HOLDMAN          LB
44  SEAN CORYATT             LB
45  BRAD CROWLEY             DL
46  CORNELIUS ANTHONY        LB
47  BILL JOHNSTON            P
48  RICH COADY               DB
51  PHILLIP MEYERS           LB
53  REX TUCKER               OL
56  TOBY MCCARTHY            OL
57  KEVIN VESTAL             DL
58  CHRIS THIERRY            LB
59  MATT MOORE               LB
62  SEMISI HEIMULI           OL
63  KYLE LEDNICKY           SNP
69  KOBY HACKRADT            OL
71  CHRIS VALLETTA           OL
72  STEVE MCKINNEY           OL
73  CAMERON SPIKES           OL
74  BRANDON HOUSTON          OL
76  CHRIS RUHMAN             OL
78  ANDY VINCENT             OL
79  SHEA HOLDER              OL
80  CHRIS COLE               WR
82  RODERRICK BROUGHTON      TE
84  MATT MAHONE              TE
86  DARREN BRINKLEY          WR
87  DERRICK SPILLER          TE
88  LEROY HODGE              WR
89  DANIEL CAMPBELL          TE
90  STEPHEN YOUNG            DL
91  TANGO MCCAULEY           DL
92  MIKE KAZMIERSKI          DL
94  ZERICK ROLLINS           DL
95  ROCKY BERNARD            DL
96  RON EDWARDS              DL
97  MARCUS HEARD             DL
99  RONALD FLEMONS           DE
