= 1997 Texas Longhorns football team =

American college football season

1997 Texas Longhorns football
- Conference: Big 12 Conference
- South Division
- Record: 4–7 (2–6 Big 12)
- Head coach: John Mackovic (6th season)
- Offensive coordinator: Gene Dahlquist (6th season)
- Offensive scheme: Pro-style
- Defensive coordinator: Bobby Jack Wright (1st season)
- Base defense: 4–3
- Home stadium: Darrell K Royal–Texas Memorial Stadium

1997 Big 12 Conference football standings
	Conf.			Overall
Team	W		L	W		L
North Division
No. 2 Nebraska † xy$	8	–	0	13	–	0
No. 8 Kansas State %	7	–	1	11	–	1
No. 23 Missouri	5	–	3	7	–	5
Colorado	3	–	5	5	–	6
Kansas	3	–	5	5	–	6
Iowa State	1	–	7	1	–	10
South Division
No. 20 Texas A&M xy	6	–	2	9	–	4
No. 24 Oklahoma State	5	–	3	8	–	4
Texas Tech	5	–	3	6	–	5
Texas	2	–	6	4	–	7
Oklahoma	2	–	6	4	–	8
Baylor	1	–	7	2	–	9
Championship: Nebraska 54, Texas A&M 15
x – Division champion/co-champions; y – Championship game participant; † – Coaches Poll national champion $ – Bowl Alliance representative as champion % – Bowl Alliance at-large representative; Rankings from AP Poll

The 1997 Texas Longhorns football team represented the University of Texas at Austin as a member South Division of the Big 12 Conference during the 1997 NCAA Division I-A football season. Led by John Mackovic in his sixth and final season as head coach, the Longhorns compiled an overall record of 4–7 with a mark of 2–6 in conference play, tying for fourth place in the Big 12's South Division. The team played home games at Darrell K Royal–Texas Memorial Stadium in Austin, Texas.

The team failed to make a bowl game, but running back Ricky Williams emerged as a national star, leading the country in rushing yards and rushing TDs on his way to winning Big 12 Offensive Player of the year honors and both the Doak Walker Award and the Jim Brown Trophy.

Mackovic was fired after the conclusion of the season, and was replaced by Coach Mack Brown.

== Schedule ==
Date	Time	Opponent	Rank	Site	TV	Result	Attendance
September 6	6:00 p.m.	Rutgers*	No. 12	Darrell K Royal–Texas Memorial Stadium; Austin, TX	FSN	W 48–14	70,882
September 13	2:30 p.m.	UCLA*	No. 11	Darrell K Royal–Texas Memorial Stadium; Austin, TX	ABC	L 3–66	77,203
September 27	11:00 a.m.	at Rice*		Rice Stadium; Houston, TX (rivalry)	ABC	W 38–31	53,811
October 4	11:30 a.m.	at Oklahoma State		Lewis Field; Stillwater, OK	FSN	L 16–42	43,100
October 11	2:30 p.m.	vs. Oklahoma		Cotton Bowl; Dallas, TX (Red River Shootout)	ABC	W 27–24	75,587
October 18	1:00 p.m.	at Missouri		Faurot Field; Columbia, MO		L 29–37	48,451
October 25	2:30 p.m.	Colorado		Darrell K Royal–Texas Memorial Stadium; Austin, TX	ABC	L 30–47	78,005
November 1	1:00 p.m.	at Baylor		Floyd Casey Stadium; Waco, TX (rivalry)		L 21–23	42,719
November 8	6:00 p.m.	Texas Tech		Darrell K Royal–Texas Memorial Stadium; Austin, TX (rivalry)	FSN	L 10–24	76,110
November 15	1:00 p.m.	Kansas		Darrell K Royal–Texas Memorial Stadium; Austin, TX		W 45–31	68,097
November 28	10:00 a.m.	at No. 15 Texas A&M		Kyle Field; College Station, TX (rivalry)	ABC	L 16–27	75,349
*Non-conference game; Rankings from AP Poll released prior to the game; All times are in Central time

== Rankings ==
Ranking movements Legend: ██ Increase in ranking ██ Decrease in ranking — = Not ranked
	Week																	
Poll	Pre	1	2	3	4	5	6	7	8	9	10	11	12	13	14	15	16	Final
AP	12	12	12	11	—	—	—	—	—	—	—	—	—	—	—	—	—	—
Coaches	10		10	10	24	—	—	—	—	—	—	—	—	—	—	—	—	—

== Game summaries ==
=== Rutgers ===
Team	1	2	3	4	Total
Scarlet Knights	7	0	0	7	14
• Longhorns	0	13	28	7	48

- Date: September 6
- Location: Darrell K Royal–Texas Memorial Stadium
- Game attendance: 70,882

Scoring summary
Q1	7:11	RUTG	Fauntleroy 1 yard run (Mike-Mayer kick)	RUTG 7–0
Q2	13:52	TEX	Williams 74 yard run (Dawson kick)	Tie 7–7
Q2	12:17	TEX	McGarity 32 yard pass from Brown (kick failed)	TEX 13–7
Q3	9:40	TEX	Williams 1 yard run (White pass from Brown)	TEX 21–7
Q3	7:18	TEX	Dawson 52 yard field goal	TEX 24–7
Q3	5:46	TEX	Williams 12 yard run (Dawson kick)	TEX 31–7
Q3	:56	TEX	Lewis 3 yard pass from Walton (Dawson kick)	TEX 38–7
Q4	4:46	RUTG	Fletcher 22 yard pass from Edmonds (Mike-Mayer kick)	TEX 38–14
Q4	2:14	TEX	Mitchell 15 yard run (Dawson kick)	TEX 45–14

- Ricky Williams 19 Rush, 155 Yds

=== UCLA ===
	1	2	3	4	Total
Bruins	28	14	21	3	66
No. 11 Longhorns	0	0	3	0	3
