= 1997 Missouri Tigers football team =

American college football season

1997 Missouri Tigers football

Holiday Bowl, L 24–35 vs. Colorado State
- Conference: Big 12 Conference
- North Division

Ranking
- Coaches: No. 23
- AP: No. 23
- Record: 7–5 (5–3 Big 12)
- Head coach: Larry Smith (4th season)
- Offensive coordinator: Jerry Berndt (4th season)
- Defensive coordinator: Moe Ankney (4th season)
- Home stadium: Faurot Field

1997 Big 12 Conference football standings
	Conf.			Overall
Team	W		L	W		L
North Division
No. 2 Nebraska † xy$	8	–	0	13	–	0
No. 8 Kansas State %	7	–	1	11	–	1
No. 23 Missouri	5	–	3	7	–	5
Colorado	3	–	5	5	–	6
Kansas	3	–	5	5	–	6
Iowa State	1	–	7	1	–	10
South Division
No. 20 Texas A&M xy	6	–	2	9	–	4
No. 24 Oklahoma State	5	–	3	8	–	4
Texas Tech	5	–	3	6	–	5
Texas	2	–	6	4	–	7
Oklahoma	2	–	6	4	–	8
Baylor	1	–	7	2	–	9
Championship: Nebraska 54, Texas A&M 15
x – Division champion/co-champions; y – Championship game participant; † – Coaches Poll national champion $ – Bowl Alliance representative as champion % – Bowl Alliance at-large representative; Rankings from AP Poll

The 1997 Missouri Tigers football team represented the University of Missouri during the 1997 NCAA Division I-A football season. The 1997 Tigers went 7–5 (5–3 in Big 12 play), ending a streak of 13 consecutive losing seasons. However, the Tigers lost to Colorado State, 35–24, in the Holiday Bowl in San Diego. They played their home games at Faurot Field in Columbia, Missouri. They were members of the Big 12 Conference in the North Division. The team was coached by head coach Larry Smith.

The loss to eventual the national champion, (and then top-ranked) Nebraska in overtime came after the infamous Flea Kicker play. This was a deflection reception off an unintentionally kicked pass as the receiver that was falling and tried pull the ball to his chest with his foot, resulting in a deflection off the foot that another receiver was able to dive a catch.

== Schedule ==
Date	Time	Opponent	Rank	Site	TV	Result	Attendance
September 6	6:30 pm	Eastern Michigan*		Faurot Field; Columbia, MO		W 44–24	52,514
September 13	11:30 am	at Kansas		Memorial Stadium; Lawrence, KS (Border War)	FSN	L 7–15	38,000
September 20	4:00 pm	at Tulsa*		Skelly Stadium; Tulsa, OK		W 42–21	40,385
September 27	11:00 am	No. 7 Ohio State*		Faurot Field; Columbia, MO	ABC	L 10–31	58,882
October 4	1:00 pm	Iowa State		Faurot Field; Columbia, MO (rivalry)		W 45–21	44,386
October 11	11:30 am	at No. 22 Kansas State		KSU Stadium; Manhattan, KS	FSN	L 11–41	43,510
October 18	1:00 pm	Texas^{†}		Faurot Field; Columbia, MO		W 37–29	48,451
October 25	11:30 am	at No. 12 Oklahoma State		Lewis Field; Stillwater, OK	FSN	W 51–50 ^{2OT}	33,300
November 1	1:30 pm	at Colorado		Folsom Field; Boulder, CO		W 41–31	43,119
November 8	2:30 pm	No. 1 Nebraska		Faurot Field; Columbia, MO (rivalry)	ABC	L 38–45 ^{OT}	66,846
November 15	1:00 pm	Baylor	No. 25	Faurot Field; Columbia, MO		W 42–24	43,825
December 29	7:00 pm	vs. No. 18 Colorado State*	No. 19	Qualcomm Stadium; San Diego, CA (Holiday Bowl)	ESPN	L 24–35	50,761
*Non-conference game; ^{†}Homecoming; Rankings from AP Poll released prior to the game; All times are in Central time

== Rankings ==
Ranking movements Legend: ██ Increase in ranking ██ Decrease in ranking — = Not ranked
	Week																	
Poll	Pre	1	2	3	4	5	6	7	8	9	10	11	12	13	14	15	16	Final
AP	—	—	—	—	—	—	—	—	—	—	—	—	25	21	19	19	19	23
Coaches	—		—	—	—	—	—	—	—	—	—	—	—	23	20	20	20	23

== Game summaries ==
=== Kansas ===
Missouri Tigers at Kansas Jayhawks

Quarter	1	2	3	4	Total
Missouri	0	7	0	0	7
Kansas	9	0	6	0	15

at Memorial Stadium, Lawrence, Kansas

- Date: September 13, 1997
- Game time: 11:30 a.m. CST
- Game attendance: 38,000
- Source

Game information
First quarter
- KU - Johner 1-yard run (kick blocked)
- KU - Garcia 32-yard field goal

Second quarter

- MU - Olivo 1-yard run (Knickman kick)

Third quarter

- KU - Vann 29-yard run (kick blocked)

Fourth quarter

- No scoring

=== Ohio State ===
#7 Ohio State Buckeyes at Missouri Tigers

Quarter	1	2	3	4	Total
Ohio State	7	7	14	3	31
Missouri	7	3	0	0	10

at Faurot Field, Columbia, Missouri

- Date: September 27, 1997
- Game time: 11:00 a.m. CST
- Game weather: 78°, Partly Cloudy, wind 5-10 S
- Game attendance: 58,882
- Referee: R. Christal

Game information
First quarter
- OSU - Pepe Pearson 3 yd run (Dan Stultz kick)
- MIZ - Corby Jones 8 yd run (Scott Knickman kick)

Second quarter

- MIZ - Scott Knickman 27 yd field goal
- OSU - David Boston 5 yd pass from Joe Germaine (Dan Stultz kick)

Third quarter

- OSU - David Boston 28 yd pass from Joe Germaine (Dan Stultz kick)
- OSU - Michael Wiley 1 yd run (Dan Stultz kick)

Fourth quarter

- OSU - Dan Stultz 28 yd field goal

=== Nebraska ===
#1 Nebraska Cornhuskers at Missouri Tigers

Quarter	1	2	3	4	OT	Total
Nebraska	14	7	7	10	7	45
Missouri	7	17	7	7	0	38

at Faurot Field, Columbia, Missouri

- Date: November 8, 1997
- Game time: 2:30 p.m. CST
- Game attendance: 66,846

== Coaching staff ==
Name	Position	Seasons at Missouri	Alma mater
Larry Smith	Head coach	4	Bowling Green (1961)
Jerry Berndt	Offensive coordinator & quarterbacks	4	Wisconsin–Superior (1960)
David Mitchell	Running backs	1	Arkansas State
Andy Hill	Wide receivers	2	Missouri (1985)
Andy Moeller	Offensive Line	5	Michigan (1986)
Corby Smith	Tight Ends	2	Iowa (1995)
Moe Ankney	Defensive Coordinator/Outside Linebackers	4	Bowling Green (1963)
Curtis Jones	Defensive Line	8	Missouri (1968)
Ricky Hunley	Inside Linebackers	4	Arizona (1984)
Jon Hoke	Defensive Backs	4	Ball State (1980)
