= 1997 Kansas State Wildcats football team =

American college football season

1997 Kansas State Wildcats football

Fiesta Bowl champion

Fiesta Bowl, W 35–18 vs. Syracuse
- Conference: Big 12 Conference
- North Division

Ranking
- Coaches: No. 7
- AP: No. 8
- Record: 11–1 (7–1 Big 12)
- Head coach: Bill Snyder (9th season)
- Offensive coordinator: Ron Hudson (1st season)
- Offensive scheme: Pro-style
- Defensive coordinator: Mike Stoops (2nd season)
- Base defense: 4–3
- Home stadium: KSU Stadium

1997 Big 12 Conference football standings
	Conf.			Overall
Team	W		L	W		L
North Division
No. 2 Nebraska † xy$	8	–	0	13	–	0
No. 8 Kansas State %	7	–	1	11	–	1
No. 23 Missouri	5	–	3	7	–	5
Colorado	3	–	5	5	–	6
Kansas	3	–	5	5	–	6
Iowa State	1	–	7	1	–	10
South Division
No. 20 Texas A&M xy	6	–	2	9	–	4
No. 24 Oklahoma State	5	–	3	8	–	4
Texas Tech	5	–	3	6	–	5
Texas	2	–	6	4	–	7
Oklahoma	2	–	6	4	–	8
Baylor	1	–	7	2	–	9
Championship: Nebraska 54, Texas A&M 15
x – Division champion/co-champions; y – Championship game participant; † – Coaches Poll national champion $ – Bowl Alliance representative as champion % – Bowl Alliance at-large representative; Rankings from AP Poll

The 1997 Kansas State Wildcats football team represented Kansas State University as a member of the North Division of the Big 12 Conference during the 1997 NCAA Division I-A football season. Led by ninth-year head coach Bill Snyder, the Wildcats compiled an overall record of 11–1 with a mark of 7–1 in conference play, placing second in the Big 12's North Division. Kansas State was invited to the Fiesta Bowl, where the Wildcats defeated Donovan McNabb's Syracuse Orangemen. The team played home games at KSU Stadium in Manhattan, Kansas.

== Schedule ==
Date	Time	Opponent	Rank	Site	TV	Result	Attendance
September 6	6:30 p.m.	at Northern Illinois*	No. 21	Huskie Stadium; DeKalb, IL		W 47–7	26,873
September 13	6:10 p.m.	Ohio*	No. 20	KSU Stadium; Manhattan, KS		W 23–20	42,097
September 27	1:10 p.m.	Bowling Green*	No. 18	KSU Stadium; Manhattan, KS		W 58–0	41,524
October 4	6:00 p.m.	at No. 3 Nebraska	No. 17	Memorial Stadium; Lincoln, NE (rivalry)	FX	L 26–56	75,856
October 11	11:30 a.m.	Missouri	No. 22	KSU Stadium; Manhattan, KS	FSN	W 41–11	43,510
October 18	2:30 p.m.	No. 14 Texas A&M^{†}	No. 20	KSU Stadium; Manhattan, KS	ABC	W 36–17	43,601
October 25	1:30 p.m.	at Oklahoma	No. 14	Oklahoma Memorial Stadium; Norman, OK		W 26–7	68,433
November 1	11:30 a.m.	at Texas Tech	No. 13	Jones Stadium; Lubbock, TX	FSN	W 13–2	38,322
November 8	1:10 p.m.	Kansas	No. 11	KSU Stadium; Manhattan, KS (rivalry)	PPV	W 48–16	43,832
November 15	2:30 p.m.	Colorado	No. 10	KSU Stadium; Manhattan, KS (rivalry)	ABC	W 37–20	43,981
November 22	11:30 a.m.	at Iowa State	No. 9	Jack Trice Stadium; Ames, IA (rivalry)	FSN	W 28–3	24,042
December 31	6:00 p.m.	vs. No. 14 Syracuse*	No. 10	Sun Devil Stadium; Tempe, AZ (Fiesta Bowl)	CBS	W 35–18	69,367
*Non-conference game; ^{†}Homecoming; Rankings from AP Poll released prior to the game; All times are in Central time

== Rankings ==
Ranking movements Legend: ██ Increase in ranking ██ Decrease in ranking т = Tied with team above or below
	Week																	
Poll	Pre	1	2	3	4	5	6	7	8	9	10	11	12	13	14	15	16	Final
AP	23	22	21т	20	20	18	17	22	20	14	13	11	10	9	11	10	10	8
Coaches	23		23	20	19	17	16	23	20	13	12	10	8	7	9	9	9	7

== Game summaries ==
=== Nebraska ===
Kansas State at Nebraska

Team	1	2	3	4	Total
Kansas State	6	0	6	14	26
• Nebraska	10	10	21	15	56

- Date: 1997-10-04
- Location: Memorial Stadium, Lincoln, Nebraska
- Game start: 6:00 p.m. CST
- Game attendance: 75,856
- TV announcers (FX): Drew Goodman, Artie Gigantino

=== Texas A&M ===
	1	2	3	4	Total
No. 14 Texas A&M	0	3	7	7	17
No. 20 Kansas State	13	3	7	13	36

=== Kansas ===
Kansas Jayhawks at #11 Kansas State Wildcats

Quarter	1	2	3	4	Total
Kansas	3	6	0	7	16
Kansas State	14	10	14	10	48

at KSU Stadium, Manhattan, Kansas

- Date: November 8, 1997
- Game time: 1:10 p.m. CST
- Game attendance: 43,832
- Box Score & Recap

=== Syracuse (Fiesta Bowl) ===
1997 Fiesta Bowl

Team	1	2	3	4	Total
• #10 Kansas State	0	21	0	14	35
#14 Syracuse	3	12	0	3	18

- Date: 1997-12-31
- Location: Sun Devil Stadium, Tempe, Arizona
- Game attendance: 69,367
- Referee: David Witvoet (Big Ten)
- TV announcers (CBS): Tim Brando and Ed Cunningham

== Roster ==
1997 Kansas State Wildcats football team roster
Players
Coaches
Offense

Pos.	#	Name	Class
RB	32	David Allen	So
QB	7	Michael Bishop	Jr
WR	80	Darnell McDonald	Jr
TE	86	Justin Swift	Jr

Defense

Pos.	#	Name	Class
DL	44	Monty Beisel	Fr
CB	23	Jerametrius Butler	Fr
DB	1	Lamar Chapman	So
S	40	Jarrod Cooper	Fr
DL	49	Darren Howard	So
LB	8	Jeff Kelly	So
LB	50	Travis Ochs	Jr
LB	42	Mark Simoneau	So

Special teams

Pos.	#	Name	Class
K	10	Martín Gramática	Jr

Head coach

- Bill Snyder

Coordinators/assistant coaches

- Ron Hudson – Offensive Coordinator & quarterbacks
- Michael Smith – Running backs
- Greg Peterson – Wide receivers & passing game coordinator
- Larry Kramer – Tight ends & Special Teams Coordinator
- Mike Stoops – Defensive Coordinator & defensive backs
- Mo Latimore – interior Defensive line
- Jon Faris – Defensive end
- Brent Venables – Linebackers
- Mark Mangino – Recruiting Game Coordinator

Legend

- (C) Team captain
- (S) Suspended
- (I) Ineligible
- Injured
- Redshirt
