= 1997 Big 12 Championship Game =

- Conference Championship
Nebraska Cornhuskers	Texas A&M Aggies
(11–0)	(9–2)
54	15
Head coach: Tom Osborne	Head coach: R. C. Slocum
AP / Coaches; 2 / 2	AP / Coaches; 14 / 14
	1	2	3	4	Total
Nebraska	16	21	3	14	54
Texas A&M	0	3	0	12	15
- Date: December 6, 1997
- Season: 1997
- Stadium: Alamodome
- Location: San Antonio, TX
- MVP: Ahman Green (RB, Nebraska)
- Referee: Hal Dowden
- Attendance: 64,824

United States TV coverage
- Network: ABC
- Announcers: Brent Musburger and Dan Fouts

1997 Big 12 Conference football standings
	Conf.			Overall
Team	W		L	W		L
North Division
No. 2 Nebraska † xy$	8	–	0	13	–	0
No. 8 Kansas State %	7	–	1	11	–	1
No. 23 Missouri	5	–	3	7	–	5
Colorado	3	–	5	5	–	6
Kansas	3	–	5	5	–	6
Iowa State	1	–	7	1	–	10
South Division
No. 20 Texas A&M xy	6	–	2	9	–	4
No. 24 Oklahoma State	5	–	3	8	–	4
Texas Tech	5	–	3	6	–	5
Texas	2	–	6	4	–	7
Oklahoma	2	–	6	4	–	8
Baylor	1	–	7	2	–	9
Championship: Nebraska 54, Texas A&M 15
x – Division champion/co-champions; y – Championship game participant; † – Coaches Poll National Champion $ – Bowl Alliance representative as champion % – Bowl Alliance at-large representative; Rankings from AP Poll

The 1997 Big 12 Championship Game was a college football game played on Saturday, December 6, 1997, at the Alamodome in San Antonio. This was the 2nd Big 12 Championship Game and determined the 1997 champion of the Big 12 Conference. The game featured the Nebraska Cornhuskers, champions of the North division, and the Texas A&M Aggies, champions of the South division.

== Game summary ==
1997 Big 12 Championship Game

Quarter	1	2	3	4	Total
No. 2 Nebraska	16	21	3	14	54
No. 14 Texas A&M	0	3	0	12	15

at Alamodome • San Antonio, Texas

- Date: December 6, 1997
- Game time: 3:30 p.m. CST
- TV announcers (ABC): Brent Musburger and Dan Fouts
- Big 12 game summary

Game information

First quarter

- (10:18) NEB – Scott Frost 6 yard run, Kris Brown kick (Drive: 8 plays, 55 yards, 3:07; NEB 7–0)
- (6:13) NEB – Kris Brown 27 yard field goal (Drive: 9 plays, 54 yards, 2:57; NEB 10–0)
- (2:19) NEB – Kris Brown 26 yard field goal (Drive: 5 plays, 17 yards, 2:37; NEB 13–0)
- (0:00) NEB – Kris Brown 31 yard field goal (Drive: 4 plays, 3 yards, 1:18; NEB 16–0)

Second quarter

- (11:18) NEB – Ahman Green 25 yard run, Kris Brown kick (Drive: 4 plays, 64 yards, 1:28; NEB 23–0)
- (8:53) TAMU – Kyle Bryant 32 yard field goal (Drive: 5 plays, 70 yards, 2:25; NEB 23–3)
- (5:19) NEB – Ahman Green 1 yard run, Kris Brown kick (Drive: 9 plays, 67 yards, 3:34; NEB 30–3)
- (0:25) NEB – Scott Frost 2 yard run, Kris Brown kick (Drive: 6 plays, 73 yards, 2:12; NEB 37–3)

Third quarter

- (7:22) NEB – Kris Brown 44 yard field goal (Drive: 6 plays, 9 yards, 1:10; NEB 40–3)

Fourth quarter

- (11:13) NEB – Ahman Green 6 yard run, Kris Brown kick (Drive: 10 plays, 55 yards, 3:47; NEB 47–3)
- (8:25) TAMU – Derrick Spiller 13 yard pass from Branndon Stewart, Stewart pass failed (Drive: 10 plays, 75 yards, 2:48; NEB 47–9)
- (3:38) TAMU – Jason Glenn 35 yard fumble return, Randy McCown pass failed (Drive: 1 plays, 35 yards, 0:10; NEB 47–15)
- (1:03) NEB – Frankie London 3 yard run, Ted Retzlaff kick (Drive: 5 plays, 22 yards, 2:35; NEB 54–15)

=== Statistics ===
Statistics	NEB	TAM
First downs	25	13
Plays–yards	85–536	71–277
Rushes–yards	67–335	23–13
Passing yards	201	264
Passing: comp–att–int	12–18–0	21–48–2
Time of possession	34:23	25:37

Team	Category	Player	Statistics
Nebraska	Passing	Scott Frost	12–18, 201 yds
Nebraska	Rushing	Ahman Green	34 car, 179 yds, 3 TD
Nebraska	Receiving	Matt Davison	3 rec, 68 yds
Texas A&M	Passing	Branndon Stewart	18–38, 227 yds, 1 TD, 2 INT
Texas A&M	Rushing	Sirr Parker	10 car, 28 yds
Texas A&M	Receiving	Derrick Spiller	4 rec, 89 yds, 1 TD
