= 1997 Colorado Buffaloes football team =

American college football season

1997 Colorado Buffaloes football
- Conference: Big 12 Conference
- North Division
- Record: 5–6, 5 wins forfeited (3–5 Big 12, 3 wins forfeited)
- Head coach: Rick Neuheisel (3rd season)
- Offensive coordinator: Karl Dorrell (3rd season)
- Offensive scheme: Multiple
- Defensive coordinator: A. J. Christoff (3rd season)
- Base defense: 4–3
- MVPs: John Hessler; Ryan Sutter
- Captain: Game captains
- Home stadium: Folsom Field

1997 Big 12 Conference football standings
	Conf.			Overall
Team	W		L	W		L
North Division
No. 2 Nebraska † xy$	8	–	0	13	–	0
No. 8 Kansas State %	7	–	1	11	–	1
No. 23 Missouri	5	–	3	7	–	5
Colorado	3	–	5	5	–	6
Kansas	3	–	5	5	–	6
Iowa State	1	–	7	1	–	10
South Division
No. 20 Texas A&M xy	6	–	2	9	–	4
No. 24 Oklahoma State	5	–	3	8	–	4
Texas Tech	5	–	3	6	–	5
Texas	2	–	6	4	–	7
Oklahoma	2	–	6	4	–	8
Baylor	1	–	7	2	–	9
Championship: Nebraska 54, Texas A&M 15
x – Division champion/co-champions; y – Championship game participant; † – Coaches Poll national champion $ – Bowl Alliance representative as champion % – Bowl Alliance at-large representative; Rankings from AP Poll

The 1997 Colorado Buffaloes football team represented the University of Colorado at Boulder as a member of the North Division of the Big 12 Conference during the 1997 NCAA Division I FBS football season. Led by third-year head coach Rick Neuheisel, the Buffaloes compiled an overall record of 5–6 in a mark of 3–5 in conference play, tying for fourth place in the Big 12 North. Colorado played home games at Folsom Field in Boulder, Colorado.

For the second time in the decade, Colorado played the nation's toughest schedule. While all five wins were forfeited due to the use of an ineligible player, the National Collegiate Athletic Association (NCAA) and Colorado recognize all the results on the field for their records.

== Schedule ==
Date	Time	Opponent	Rank	Site	TV	Result	Attendance
September 6	11:30 am	No. 24 Colorado State*	No. 8	Folsom Field; Boulder, CO (Rocky Mountain Showdown)	FSN	W 31–21 (vacated)	53,416
September 13	10:00 am	at No. 14 Michigan*	No. 8	Michigan Stadium; Ann Arbor, MI (College GameDay)	ABC	L 3–27	106,474
September 27	1:30 pm	Wyoming*^{†}	No. 16	Folsom Field; Boulder, CO	FSN	W 20–19 (vacated)	50,971
October 4	1:30 pm	No. 21 Texas A&M	No. 16	Folsom Field; Boulder, CO	ABC	L 10–16	50,877
October 11	5:00 pm	at No. 20 Oklahoma State	No. 24	Lewis Field; Stillwater, OK	FSN	L 29–33	50,100
October 18	5:00 pm	Kansas		Folsom Field; Boulder, CO	FSN	W 42–6 (vacated)	52,097
October 25	1:30 pm	at Texas		Darrell K Royal–Texas Memorial Stadium; Austin, TX	ABC	W 47–30 (vacated)	78,005
November 1	12:30 pm	Missouri		Folsom Field; Boulder, CO		L 31–41	49,848
November 8	10:30 am	at Iowa State		Jack Trice Stadium; Ames, IA	FSN	W 43–38 (vacated)	32,080
November 15	1:30 pm	at No. 10 Kansas State		KSU Stadium; Manhattan, Kansas (rivalry)	ABC	L 20–37	43,981
November 28	12:30 pm	No. 2 Nebraska		Folsom Field; Boulder, CO (rivalry)	ABC	L 24–27	52,738
*Non-conference game; ^{†}Homecoming; Rankings from AP Poll released prior to the game; All times are in Mountain time

== Rankings ==
Ranking movements Legend: ██ Increase in ranking ██ Decrease in ranking — = Not ranked ( ) = First-place votes
	Week																	
Poll	Pre	1	2	3	4	5	6	7	8	9	10	11	12	13	14	15	16	Final
AP	8 (3)	8 (3)	8 (3)	8 (3)	15	16	16	24	—	—	—	—	—	—	—	—	—	—
Coaches	7 (3)		7 (1)	7 (1)	16	16	18	25	—	—	—	—	—	—	—	—	—	—
