= 1997 Oklahoma State Cowboys football team =

American college football season

1997 Oklahoma State Cowboys football

Alamo Bowl, L 20–33 vs. Purdue
- Conference: Big 12 Conference
- South Division

Ranking
- Coaches: No. 24
- AP: No. 24
- Record: 8–4 (5–3 Big 12)
- Head coach: Bob Simmons (3rd season)
- Offensive coordinator: Les Miles (3rd season)
- Offensive scheme: I formation
- Defensive coordinator: Rob Ryan (1st season)
- Base defense: 4–3
- Home stadium: Lewis Field

1997 Big 12 Conference football standings
	Conf.			Overall
Team	W		L	W		L
North Division
No. 2 Nebraska † xy$	8	–	0	13	–	0
No. 8 Kansas State %	7	–	1	11	–	1
No. 23 Missouri	5	–	3	7	–	5
Colorado	3	–	5	5	–	6
Kansas	3	–	5	5	–	6
Iowa State	1	–	7	1	–	10
South Division
No. 20 Texas A&M xy	6	–	2	9	–	4
No. 24 Oklahoma State	5	–	3	8	–	4
Texas Tech	5	–	3	6	–	5
Texas	2	–	6	4	–	7
Oklahoma	2	–	6	4	–	8
Baylor	1	–	7	2	–	9
Championship: Nebraska 54, Texas A&M 15
x – Division champion/co-champions; y – Championship game participant; † – Coaches Poll national champion $ – Bowl Alliance representative as champion % – Bowl Alliance at-large representative; Rankings from AP Poll

The 1997 Oklahoma State Cowboys football team represented Oklahoma State University as a member of the Big 12 Conference during the 1997 NCAA Division I-A football season. Led by third-year head coach Bob Simmons, the Cowboys compiled an overall record of 8–4 with a mark of 5–3 in conference play, tying for second place in the Big 12's South Division. Oklahoma State was invited to the Alamo Bowl, where the Cowboys lost to Purdue. The team played home games at Lewis Field in Stillwater, Oklahoma.

== Schedule ==
Date	Time	Opponent	Rank	Site	TV	Result	Attendance	Source
August 30	5:30 p.m.	at Iowa State		Jack Trice Stadium; Ames, IA	FSN	W 21–14	43,841	
September 6	7:00 p.m.	at Southwestern Louisiana*		Cajun Field; Lafayette, LA		W 31–7	16,724	
September 13	6:00 p.m.	Fresno State*		Lewis Field; Stillwater, OK		W 35–0	36,000	
September 27	6:00 p.m.	Northeast Louisiana*		Lewis Field; Stillwater, OK		W 38–7	35,200	
October 4	11:30 a.m.	Texas		Lewis Field; Stillwater, OK	FSN	W 42–16	43,100	
October 11	6:00 p.m.	No. 24 Colorado^{†}	No. 20	Lewis Field; Stillwater, OK	FSN	W 33–29	50,100	
October 25	11:30 a.m.	Missouri	No. 12	Lewis Field; Stillwater, OK	FSN	L 50–51 ^{2OT}	33,300	
November 1	6:00 p.m.	at No. 25 Texas A&M	No. 19	Kyle Field; College Station, TX	FSN	L 25–28 ^{OT}	60,776	
November 8	1:00 p.m.	at Oklahoma	No. 25	Oklahoma Memorial Stadium; Norman, OK (Bedlam)	PPV	W 30–7	72,422	
November 15	2:00 p.m.	Texas Tech	No. 24	Lewis Field; Stillwater, OK		L 3–27	39,400	
November 22	2:30 p.m.	at Baylor		Floyd Casey Stadium; Waco, TX	ABC	W 24–14	34,794	
December 30	7:00 p.m.	vs. No. 17 Purdue*	No. 24	Alamodome; San Antonio, TX (Alamo Bowl)	ESPN	L 20–33	55,552	
*Non-conference game; ^{†}Homecoming; Rankings from AP Poll released prior to the game; All times are in Central time

== Rankings ==
Ranking movements Legend: ██ Increase in ranking ██ Decrease in ranking — = Not ranked т = Tied with team above or below
	Week																	
Poll	Pre	1	2	3	4	5	6	7	8	9	10	11	12	13	14	15	16	Final
AP	—	—	—	—	—	—	—	20	16	12	19	25	24	—	25	24	24	24
Coaches	—		—	—	—	—	—	20т	16	12	19	23	21	—	25	24	24	24

== After the season ==
The 1998 NFL draft was held on April 18–19, 1998. The following Cowboys were selected.

Round	Pick	Player	Position	NFL club
1	28	R. W. McQuarters	Defensive back	San Francisco 49ers
3	87	Kevin Williams	Defensive back	New York Jets
4	94	Alonzo Mayes	Tight end	Chicago Bears
