= 1997 Texas Tech Red Raiders football team =

American college football season

1997 Texas Tech Red Raiders football
- Conference: Big 12 Conference
- South Division
- Record: 6–5 (5–3 Big 12)
- Head coach: Spike Dykes (11th season)
- Offensive coordinator: Rick Dykes (2nd season)
- Offensive scheme: Spread
- Defensive coordinator: John Goodner (3rd season)
- Base defense: 4–2–5/4–4 hybrid
- Home stadium: Jones Stadium

1997 Big 12 Conference football standings
	Conf.			Overall
Team	W		L	W		L
North Division
No. 2 Nebraska † xy$	8	–	0	13	–	0
No. 8 Kansas State %	7	–	1	11	–	1
No. 23 Missouri	5	–	3	7	–	5
Colorado	3	–	5	5	–	6
Kansas	3	–	5	5	–	6
Iowa State	1	–	7	1	–	10
South Division
No. 20 Texas A&M xy	6	–	2	9	–	4
No. 24 Oklahoma State	5	–	3	8	–	4
Texas Tech	5	–	3	6	–	5
Texas	2	–	6	4	–	7
Oklahoma	2	–	6	4	–	8
Baylor	1	–	7	2	–	9
Championship: Nebraska 54, Texas A&M 15
x – Division champion/co-champions; y – Championship game participant; † – Coaches Poll national champion $ – Bowl Alliance representative as champion % – Bowl Alliance at-large representative; Rankings from AP Poll

The 1997 Texas Tech Red Raiders football team represented Texas Tech University as a member of the Big 12 Conference during the 1997 NCAA Division I-A football season. In their 11th season under head coach Spike Dykes, the Red Raiders compiled a 6–5 record (5–3 against Big 12 opponents), finished in a tie for second place in Southern Division of the Big 12, and outscored opponents by a combined total of 245 to 217. The team played its home games at Clifford B. and Audrey Jones Stadium in Lubbock, Texas.

== Schedule ==
Date	Time	Opponent	Site	TV	Result	Attendance	Source
August 30	6:45 pm	at No. 5 Tennessee*	Neyland Stadium; Knoxville, TN	ESPN	L 17–52	106,285	
September 13	6:30 pm	Southwestern Louisiana*	Jones Stadium; Lubbock, TX		W 59–14	35,953	
September 20	6:30 pm	North Texas*	Jones Stadium; Lubbock, TX		L 27–30	43,620	
October 4	6:00 pm	at Baylor	Floyd Casey Stadium; Waco, TX (rivalry)		W 35–14	35,275	
October 11	6:30 pm	Kansas^{†}	Jones Stadium; Lubbock, TX		W 17–7	43,012	
October 18	12:30 pm	at No. 2 Nebraska	Memorial Stadium; Lincoln, NE		L 0–29	75,764	
October 25	1:00 pm	No. 20 Texas A&M	Jones Stadium; Lubbock, TX (rivalry)		W 16–13	50,513	
November 1	11:30 am	No. 13 Kansas State	Jones Stadium; Lubbock, TX	FSN	L 2–13	38,322	
November 8	6:00 pm	at Texas	Texas Memorial Stadium; Austin, TX (rivalry)	FSN	W 24–10	76,110	
November 15	2:00 pm	at Oklahoma State	Lewis Field; Stillwater, OK		W 27–3	39,400	
November 22	1:00 pm	Oklahoma	Jones Stadium; Lubbock, TX		L 21–32	40,013	
*Non-conference game; ^{†}Homecoming; Rankings from AP Poll released prior to the game; All times are in Central time
