= 1997 Kansas Jayhawks football team =

American college football season

1997 Kansas Jayhawks football
- Conference: Big 12 Conference
- North Division
- Record: 5–6 (3–5 Big 12)
- Head coach: Terry Allen (1st season)
- Offensive coordinator: Bill Salmon (1st season)
- Defensive coordinator: Ardell Wiegandt (1st season)
- Home stadium: Memorial Stadium

1997 Big 12 Conference football standings
	Conf.			Overall
Team	W		L	W		L
North Division
No. 2 Nebraska † xy$	8	–	0	13	–	0
No. 8 Kansas State %	7	–	1	11	–	1
No. 23 Missouri	5	–	3	7	–	5
Colorado	3	–	5	5	–	6
Kansas	3	–	5	5	–	6
Iowa State	1	–	7	1	–	10
South Division
No. 20 Texas A&M xy	6	–	2	9	–	4
No. 24 Oklahoma State	5	–	3	8	–	4
Texas Tech	5	–	3	6	–	5
Texas	2	–	6	4	–	7
Oklahoma	2	–	6	4	–	8
Baylor	1	–	7	2	–	9
Championship: Nebraska 54, Texas A&M 15
x – Division champion/co-champions; y – Championship game participant; † – Coaches Poll national champion $ – Bowl Alliance representative as champion % – Bowl Alliance at-large representative; Rankings from AP Poll

The 1997 Kansas Jayhawks football team represented the University of Kansas as a member of the North Division of the Big 12 Conference during the 1997 NCAA Division I-A football season. Led by first-year head coach Terry Allen, the Jayhawks compiled an overall record of 5–6 with a mark of 3–5 in conference play, tying for fourth place in the Big 12's North Division. The team played home games at Memorial Stadium in Lawrence, Kansas.

== Schedule ==
Date	Time	Opponent	Site	TV	Result	Attendance	Source
August 28	7:00 p.m.	UAB*	Memorial Stadium; Lawrence, KS		W 24–0	32,100	
September 6	1:00 p.m.	TCU*	Memorial Stadium; Lawrence, KS		W 17–10	35,000	
September 13	11:30 a.m.	Missouri	Memorial Stadium; Lawrence, KS (Border War)	FSN	W 15–7	38,000	
September 20	6:00 p.m.	at Cincinnati*	Nippert Stadium; Cincinnati, OH		L 7–34	17,636	
October 4	1:00 p.m.	Oklahoma	Memorial Stadium; Lawrence, KS		W 20–17	43,500	
October 11	6:30 p.m.	at Texas Tech	Jones Stadium; Lubbock, TX		L 7–17	43,012	
October 18	6:00 p.m.	at Colorado	Folsom Field; Boulder, CO	FSN	L 6–42	52,097	
October 25	6:00 p.m.	No. 1 Nebraska	Memorial Stadium; Lawrence, KS (rivalry)	FSN	L 0–35	42,000	
November 1	1:00 p.m.	Iowa State^{†}	Memorial Stadium; Lawrence, KS		W 34–24	34,000	
November 8	1:10 p.m.	at No. 11 Kansas State	KSU Stadium; Manhattan, KS (Sunflower Showdown)	PPV	L 16–48	43,832	
November 15	1:00 p.m.	at Texas	Darrell K Royal–Texas Memorial Stadium; Austin, TX		L 31–45	68,097	
*Non-conference game; ^{†}Homecoming; Rankings from AP Poll released prior to the game; All times are in Central time

Some sources cite the record at 6 wins and 5 losses due to a forfeit from Colorado after the game was played. However, Colorado was not required to change the record and some sources will show the season record at 5 wins and 6 losses.

== Game summaries ==
=== Missouri ===
Missouri Tigers at Kansas Jayhawks

Quarter	1	2	3	4	Total
Missouri	0	7	0	0	7
Kansas	9	0	6	0	15

at Memorial Stadium, Lawrence, Kansas

- Date: September 13, 1997
- Game time: 11:30 a.m. CST
- Game attendance: 38,000
- Source

Game information
First quarter
- KU - Johner 1-yard run (kick blocked)
- KU - Garcia 32-yard field goal

Second quarter

- MU - Olivo 1-yard run (Knickman kick)

Third quarter

- KU - Vann 29-yard run (kick blocked)

Fourth quarter

- No scoring

=== Kansas State ===
Kansas Jayhawks at #11 Kansas State Wildcats

Quarter	1	2	3	4	Total
Kansas	3	6	0	7	16
Kansas State	14	10	14	10	48

at KSU Stadium, Manhattan, Kansas

- Date: November 8, 1997
- Game time: 1:10 p.m. CST
- Game attendance: 43,832
- Box Score & Recap
