= 1997 Oklahoma Sooners football team =

American college football season

1997 Oklahoma Sooners football
- Conference: Big 12 Conference
- South Division
- Record: 4–8 (2–6 Big 12)
- Head coach: John Blake (2nd season)
- Offensive coordinator: Dick Winder (2nd season)
- Offensive scheme: Pro-style
- Defensive coordinator: Bill Young (2nd season)
- Base defense: 4–3
- Captain: Game captains
- Home stadium: Oklahoma Memorial Stadium

1997 Big 12 Conference football standings
	Conf.			Overall
Team	W		L	W		L
North Division
No. 2 Nebraska † xy$	8	–	0	13	–	0
No. 8 Kansas State %	7	–	1	11	–	1
No. 23 Missouri	5	–	3	7	–	5
Colorado	3	–	5	5	–	6
Kansas	3	–	5	5	–	6
Iowa State	1	–	7	1	–	10
South Division
No. 20 Texas A&M xy	6	–	2	9	–	4
No. 24 Oklahoma State	5	–	3	8	–	4
Texas Tech	5	–	3	6	–	5
Texas	2	–	6	4	–	7
Oklahoma	2	–	6	4	–	8
Baylor	1	–	7	2	–	9
Championship: Nebraska 54, Texas A&M 15
x – Division champion/co-champions; y – Championship game participant; † – Coaches Poll national champion $ – Bowl Alliance representative as champion % – Bowl Alliance at-large representative; Rankings from AP Poll

The 1997 Oklahoma Sooners football team represented the University of Oklahoma during the 1997 NCAA Division I-A football season. They played their home games at Oklahoma Memorial Stadium and participated as members of the Big 12 Conference in the South Division. They were coached by John Blake.

== Schedule ==
Date	Time	Opponent	Site	TV	Result	Attendance
August 23	11:00 a.m.	vs. Northwestern*	Soldier Field; Chicago, IL (Pigskin Classic)	ABC	L 0–24	36,804
September 6	2:30 p.m.	Syracuse*	Oklahoma Memorial Stadium; Norman, OK	ABC	W 36–34	68,342
September 20	5:30 p.m.	at California*	California Memorial Stadium; Berkeley, CA	FSN	L 36–40	48,260
September 27	6:00 p.m.	Louisville*	Oklahoma Memorial Stadium; Norman, OK	FSN	W 35–14	74,993
October 4	1:00 p.m.	at Kansas	Memorial Stadium; Lawrence, KS		L 17–20	43,500
October 11	2:30 p.m.	vs. Texas	Cotton Bowl; Dallas, TX (Red River Shootout)	ABC	L 24–27	75,587
October 18	11:30 a.m.	Baylor^{†}	Oklahoma Memorial Stadium; Norman, OK	FSN	W 24–23	68,578
October 25	1:30 p.m.	No. 14 Kansas State	Oklahoma Memorial Stadium; Norman, OK	PPV	L 7–26	68,433
November 1	2:30 p.m.	at No. 1 Nebraska	Memorial Stadium; Lincoln, NE (rivalry)	ABC	L 7–69	75,926
November 8	1:00 p.m.	No. 25 Oklahoma State	Oklahoma Memorial Stadium; Norman, OK (Bedlam Series)	PPV	L 7–30	72,422
November 15	6:00 p.m.	No. 18 Texas A&M	Oklahoma Memorial Stadium; Norman, OK	FSN	L 7–51	64,929
November 22	1:00 p.m.	at Texas Tech	Jones Stadium; Lubbock, TX	PPV	W 32–21	40,013
*Non-conference game; ^{†}Homecoming; Rankings from AP Poll released prior to the game; All times are in Central time

== Game summaries ==
=== Texas Tech ===
Team	1	2	3	4	Total
• Oklahoma	0	9	13	10	32
Texas Tech	3	15	0	3	21

- Date: November 22
- Location: Jones Stadium, Lubbock, Texas
- Game attendance: 40,013

Scoring summary
Q1	1:44	TTU	Tony Rogers 47 yard field goal	TTU 3–0
Q2	12:59	OKLA	Jeremy Alexander 51 yard field goal	Tie 3–3
Q2	10:29	OKLA	Dane Johnson 57 yard fumble return (Zebbie Lethridge run)	TTU 11–3
Q2	5:39	OKLA	Michael Rose 2 yard run (two-point failed)	TTU 11–9
Q2	:33	TTU	Kyle Shipley recovered fumble in end zone (Tony Rogers kick)	TTU 18–9
Q3	9:01	OKLA	Stephen Alexander 19 yard pass from Justin Fuente (Jeremy Alexander kick)	TTU 18–16
Q3	:46	OKLA	Seth Littrell 1 yard run (two-point failed)	OKLA 22–18
Q4	14:02	OKLA	Jeremy Alexander 32 yard field goal	OKLA 25–18
Q4	12:19	TTU	Tony Rogers 49 yard field goal	OKLA 25–21
Q4	6:08	OKLA	Seth Littrell 24 yard run (Jeremy Alexander kick)	OKLA 32–21

== Awards ==
- All-Big 12: DT Kelly Gregg

== 1998 NFL draft ==
The following Sooners were selected in the 1998 NFL draft.

Round	Pick	Player	Position	NFL team
2	48	Stephen Alexander	Tight end	Washington Redskins
5	124	Martin Chase	Defensive tackle	Baltimore Ravens
5	152	Travian Smith	Linebacker	Oakland Raiders
6	164	Sammy Williams	Offensive tackle	Baltimore Ravens
