= 1997 Baylor Bears football team =

American college football season

1997 Baylor Bears football
- Conference: Big 12 Conference
- South Division
- Record: 2–9 (1–7 Big 12)
- Head coach: Dave Roberts (1st season)
- Offensive coordinator: Darryl Drake (1st season)
- Offensive scheme: Multiple I formation
- Defensive coordinator: Mike Cassity (1st season)
- Base defense: 4–3
- Home stadium: Floyd Casey Stadium

1997 Big 12 Conference football standings
| | Conf. | | | Overall |
| Team | W | | L | W | | L |
|---|---|---|---|---|---|---|
North Division
| No. 2 Nebraska † xy$ | 8 | – | 0 | 13 | – | 0 |
| No. 8 Kansas State % | 7 | – | 1 | 11 | – | 1 |
| No. 23 Missouri | 5 | – | 3 | 7 | – | 5 |
| Colorado | 3 | – | 5 | 5 | – | 6 |
| Kansas | 3 | – | 5 | 5 | – | 6 |
| Iowa State | 1 | – | 7 | 1 | – | 10 |
South Division
| No. 20 Texas A&M xy | 6 | – | 2 | 9 | – | 4 |
| No. 24 Oklahoma State | 5 | – | 3 | 8 | – | 4 |
| Texas Tech | 5 | – | 3 | 6 | – | 5 |
| Texas | 2 | – | 6 | 4 | – | 7 |
| Oklahoma | 2 | – | 6 | 4 | – | 8 |
| Baylor | 1 | – | 7 | 2 | – | 9 |
Championship: Nebraska 54, Texas A&M 15
x – Division champion/co-champions; y – Championship game participant; † – Coaches Poll national champion $ – Bowl Alliance representative as champion % – Bowl Alliance at-large representative; Rankings from AP Poll

The 1997 Baylor Bears football team represented Baylor University as a member of the South Division of the Big 12 Conference during the 1997 NCAA Division I-A football season. Led by first-year head coach Dave Roberts, the Bears compiled an overall record of 2–9 with a mark of 1–7 in conference play, placing last out of six teams in the Big 12's South Division. The team played home games at Floyd Casey Stadium in Waco, Texas.

== Schedule ==
| Date | Time | Opponent | Site | TV | Result | Attendance |
|---|---|---|---|---|---|---|
| August 30 | 2:30 p.m. | No. 14 Miami (FL)* | Floyd Casey Stadium; Waco, TX | ABC | L 14–45 | 36,750 |
| September 6 | 8:00 p.m. | at Fresno State* | Bulldog Stadium; Fresno, CA | | W 37–35 | 32,266 |
| September 26 | 11:30 a.m. | at No. 8 Michigan* | Michigan Stadium; Ann Arbor, MI | ESPN | L 3–38 | 106,041 |
| October 4 | 6:00 p.m. | Texas Tech | Floyd Casey Stadium; Waco, TX (rivalry) | | L 14–35 | 35,275 |
| October 11 | 6:00 p.m. | No. 3 Nebraska | Floyd Casey Stadium; Waco, TX | | L 21–49 | 38,175 |
| October 18 | 11:30 a.m. | at Oklahoma | Oklahoma Memorial Stadium; Norman, OK | FSN | L 23–24 | 68,578 |
| October 25 | 1:00 p.m. | at Iowa State | Jack Trice Stadium; Ames, IA | | L 17–24 | 34,404 |
| November 1 | 1:00 p.m. | Texas | Floyd Casey Stadium; Waco, TX (rivalry) | | W 23–21 | 42,719 |
| November 8 | 1:00 p.m. | at No. 21 Texas A&M | Kyle Field; College Station, TX (Battle of the Brazos) | | L 10–38 | 64,006 |
| November 15 | 1:00 p.m. | at Missouri | Faurot Field; Columbia, MO | | L 24–42 | 43,825 |
| November 22 | 2:30 p.m. | Oklahoma State | Floyd Casey Stadium; Waco, TX | ABC | L 14–24 | 34,794 |
*Non-conference game; Rankings from AP Poll released prior to the game; All times are in Central time
