= 1997 Iowa State Cyclones football team =

American college football season

1997 Iowa State Cyclones football
- Conference: Big 12 Conference
- North Division
- Record: 1–10 (1–7 Big 12)
- Head coach: Dan McCarney (3rd season)
- Offensive coordinator: Steve Loney (3rd season)
- Offensive scheme: Pro set
- Defensive coordinator: John Skladany (1st season)
- Base defense: 4–3
- Home stadium: Jack Trice Stadium

1997 Big 12 Conference football standings
	Conf.			Overall
Team	W		L	W		L
North Division
No. 2 Nebraska † xy$	8	–	0	13	–	0
No. 8 Kansas State %	7	–	1	11	–	1
No. 23 Missouri	5	–	3	7	–	5
Colorado	3	–	5	5	–	6
Kansas	3	–	5	5	–	6
Iowa State	1	–	7	1	–	10
South Division
No. 20 Texas A&M xy	6	–	2	9	–	4
No. 24 Oklahoma State	5	–	3	8	–	4
Texas Tech	5	–	3	6	–	5
Texas	2	–	6	4	–	7
Oklahoma	2	–	6	4	–	8
Baylor	1	–	7	2	–	9
Championship: Nebraska 54, Texas A&M 15
x – Division champion/co-champions; y – Championship game participant; † – Coaches Poll national champion $ – Bowl Alliance representative as champion % – Bowl Alliance at-large representative; Rankings from AP Poll

The 1997 Iowa State Cyclones football team represented Iowa State University as a member of the North Division in the Big 12 Conference during the 1997 NCAA Division I-A football season. Led by third-year head coach Dan McCarney, the Cyclones compiled an overall record of 1–10 with a mark of 1–7 in conference play, placing last out of six teams in the Big 12's North Division. Iowa State played home games at Jack Trice Stadium in Ames, Iowa.

== Schedule ==
Date	Time	Opponent	Site	TV	Result	Attendance
August 30	5:30 p.m.	Oklahoma State	Jack Trice Stadium; Ames, IA	FSN	L 14–21	43,841
September 6	3:00 p.m.	at Wyoming*	War Memorial Stadium; Laramie, WY		L 10–56	20,857
September 13	6:00 p.m.	at Minnesota*	Hubert H. Humphrey Metrodome; Minneapolis, MN	MSC	L 29–53	55,942
September 20	2:30 p.m.	No. 13 Iowa*	Jack Trice Stadium; Ames, IA (rivalry)	ABC	L 20–63	50,066
October 4	1:00 p.m.	at Missouri	Faurot Field; Columbia, MO (rivalry)		L 21–45	44,386
October 11	1:00 p.m.	at No. 15 Texas A&M	Kyle Field; College Station, TX		L 17–56	58,159
October 25	1:00 p.m.	Baylor^{†}	Jack Trice Stadium; Ames, IA		W 24–17	34,404
November 1	1:00 p.m.	at Kansas	Memorial Stadium; Lawrence, KS		L 24–34	30,000
November 8	11:30 a.m.	Colorado	Jack Trice Stadium; Ames, IA	FSN	L 38–43	30,080
November 15	11:30 a.m.	at No. 3 Nebraska	Memorial Stadium; Lincoln, NE (rivalry)	FSN	L 14–77	75,613
November 22	11:30 a.m.	No. 9 Kansas State	Jack Trice Stadium; Ames, IA (rivalry)	FSN	L 3–28	24,042
*Non-conference game; ^{†}Homecoming; Rankings from AP Poll released prior to the game; All times are in Central time
