= Aaron Taylor (American football, born 1975) =

American football player (born 1975)

No. 67
- Position: Guard

Personal information
- Born: January 21, 1975 (age 51); Wichita Falls, Texas, U.S.
- Listed height: 6 ft 1 in (1.85 m)
- Listed weight: 320 lb (145 kg)

Career information
- High school: S. H. Rider (Wichita Falls)
- College: Nebraska
- NFL draft: 1998: 7th round, 190th overall pick

Career history
- Indianapolis Colts (1998)*; Chicago Bears (1998)
- * Offseason or practice squad member only

Awards and highlights
- 3× National champion (1994, 1995, 1997); Outland Trophy (1997); Jim Parker Trophy (1997); Unanimous All-American (1997); Consensus All-American (1996); 2× First-team All-Big 12 (1996, 1997); First-team All-Big Eight (1995); Nebraska Cornhuskers Jersey No. 67 retired
- College Football Hall of Fame

Aaron Taylor (born January 21, 1975) is an American former college football player who was an offensive lineman for the Nebraska Cornhuskers. Taylor was a two-time All-American and won the Outland Trophy in 1997.

== Early life ==
Taylor was born in Wichita Falls, Texas. He attended S. H. Rider High School in Wichita Falls, where he played high school football for the Rider Raiders.

== College career ==
Taylor attended the University of Nebraska and played for the Nebraska Cornhuskers football team from 1994 to 1997. As a senior in 1997, he won the Outland Trophy as the top college interior lineman in the country. He is one of seven Nebraska players to have won the Outland Trophy and is the only Husker to be awarded All-American honors at two different positions, offensive center and guard. He was also the winner of the Jim Parker Award. During his career, he helped the Cornhuskers to numerous successes, such as achieving a win-loss record of 49-2 (a winning percentage of .961), wins in four straight bowl games, and going undefeated in the 1994, 1995, and 1997 seasons winning national titles in each. In 1998, Nebraska retired Taylor's jersey, making him one of just 25 former Nebraska Cornhusker football players to receive such recognition as of December 2023. In 1999, he was selected to the Nebraska All-Century Football Team via fan poll and in 2002 was named to the Athlon Sports Nebraska All-Time Team.

== Collegiate All Century Teams ==
In 2010 Taylor was selected as a third-team offensive guard by Sports Illustrated in their "NCAA Football All-Century Team." The starters were Jim Parker (Ohio State) and John Hannah (Alabama), the second-team consisted of Bob Suffridge (Tennessee) and Bill Fischer (Notre Dame), and the third-team player was Dean Steinkuhler (Nebraska). Taylor was one of six Nebraska Cornhuskers selected to this 85-man roster, the others being Rich Glover, Johnny Rodgers, Dave Rimington, Dean Steinkuhler, and Tommie Frazier.

In 1999, Taylor was selected as a starting offensive guard to the Walter Camp Football Foundation College Football All Century Team. The other offensive guards selected were John Hannah (Alabama), Dean Steinkuhler, Brad Budde (USC), Will Shields (Nebraska) and Jim Parker (Ohio State). Taylor was one of six Nebraska Cornhuskers selected to this 83-man team, the others being Rodgers, Rimington, Steinkuhler, Shields and Frazier.

== Professional career ==
After Nebraska, Taylor was selected in the seventh round of the 1998 NFL draft by the Indianapolis Colts. Taylor played for the Colts for the first part of the 1998 season before becoming a member of the Chicago Bears.

== Personal life ==
After the 1998 season, Taylor retired from professional football to start a career in business and to help coach high school football. Taylor currently works for Union Pacific Railroad in Omaha, Nebraska.
