= 1997 Nebraska Cornhuskers football team =

American college football season

1997 Nebraska Cornhuskers football

Coaches Poll national champion Big 12 champion Big 12 North Division champion Orange Bowl champion

Big 12 Championship Game, W 54–15 vs. Texas A&M

Orange Bowl (BA NCG), W 42–17 vs. Tennessee
- Conference: Big 12 Conference
- North Division

Ranking
- Coaches: No. 1
- AP: No. 2
- Record: 13–0 (8–0 Big 12)
- Head coach: Tom Osborne (25th season)
- Offensive scheme: I formation
- Defensive coordinator: Charlie McBride (17th season)
- Base defense: 4–3
- Home stadium: Memorial Stadium

1997 Big 12 Conference football standings
	Conf.			Overall
Team	W		L	W		L
North Division
No. 2 Nebraska † xy$	8	–	0	13	–	0
No. 8 Kansas State %	7	–	1	11	–	1
No. 23 Missouri	5	–	3	7	–	5
Colorado	3	–	5	5	–	6
Kansas	3	–	5	5	–	6
Iowa State	1	–	7	1	–	10
South Division
No. 20 Texas A&M xy	6	–	2	9	–	4
No. 24 Oklahoma State	5	–	3	8	–	4
Texas Tech	5	–	3	6	–	5
Texas	2	–	6	4	–	7
Oklahoma	2	–	6	4	–	8
Baylor	1	–	7	2	–	9
Championship: Nebraska 54, Texas A&M 15
x – Division champion/co-champions; y – Championship game participant; † – Coaches Poll national champion $ – Bowl Alliance representative as champion % – Bowl Alliance at-large representative; Rankings from AP Poll

The 1997 Nebraska Cornhuskers football team represented the University of Nebraska–Lincoln in the 1997 NCAA Division I-A football season. The team was led by 25th-year head coach Tom Osborne and played their home games in Memorial Stadium in Lincoln, Nebraska. The Cornhuskers competed as members of the Big 12 Conference in the league's second year of existence.

The Cornhuskers compiled a perfect 13–0 record and claimed their third national championship in four years. Nebraska was ranked first in the final Coaches Poll of the year, but was ranked second behind Michigan (also undefeated, at 12–0) in the final AP Poll. Of the 20 official championship selectors designated by the NCAA, 13 selected Nebraska as national champions, six selected Michigan, and one declared them co-champions. It remains one of the most hotly contested national championship debates in college football history.

Nebraska secured their first Big 12 Conference championship by defeating Texas A&M by a score of 54–15 in the Big 12 Championship Game. Nebraska had been upset by Texas in the inaugural Big 12 Championship Game in 1996. The season ended with a 42–17 victory over No. 3 Tennessee in the 1998 Orange Bowl for their fourth consecutive major bowl victory.

The Nebraska offense, which led the country in scoring, was led by quarterback Scott Frost and running back Ahman Green. Frost became just the tenth player in college football history to both pass and run for 1,000 yards. Green finished second in the country in rushing yards with 1,877 yards, and tied for third in touchdowns with 22. Offensive lineman Aaron Taylor was named a consensus All-American and was the recipient of the Outland Trophy. The Cornhusker defense was anchored by All-American defensive linemen Jason Peter and Grant Wistrom, winner of the Lombardi Award.

Head coach Tom Osborne announced after the regular season that the Orange Bowl would be his final game as head coach. He retired as Nebraska's all-time winningest coach, and was sixth in wins all-time in major college football history at the time of his retirement.

== Schedule ==
Date	Time	Opponent	Rank	Site	TV	Result	Attendance	Source
August 30	1:00 pm	Akron*	No. 6	Memorial Stadium; Lincoln, NE		W 59–14	75,124	
September 13	12:30 pm	UCF*	No. 6	Memorial Stadium; Lincoln, NE		W 38–24	75,327	
September 20	2:30 pm	at No. 2 Washington*	No. 7	Husky Stadium; Seattle, WA	ABC	W 27–14	74,023	
October 4	6:00 pm	No. 17 Kansas State	No. 3	Memorial Stadium; Lincoln, NE (rivalry)	FSN	W 56–26	75,856	
October 11	6:00 pm	at Baylor	No. 3	Floyd Casey Stadium; Waco, TX		W 49–21	38,175	
October 18	12:30 pm	Texas Tech^{†}	No. 2	Memorial Stadium; Lincoln, NE		W 29–0	75,764	
October 25	6:00 pm	at Kansas	No. 1	Memorial Stadium; Lawrence, KS (rivalry)	FSN	W 35–0	42,000	
November 1	2:30 pm	Oklahoma	No. 1	Memorial Stadium; Lincoln, NE (rivalry)	ABC	W 69–7	75,926	
November 8	2:30 pm	at Missouri	No. 1	Faurot Field; Columbia, MO (Flea Kicker, rivalry)	ABC	W 45–38 ^{OT}	66,846	
November 15	11:30 am	Iowa State	No. 3	Memorial Stadium; Lincoln, NE (rivalry)	FSN	W 77–14	75,613	
November 28	1:30 pm	at Colorado	No. 2	Folsom Field; Boulder, CO (rivalry)	ABC	W 27–24	52,738	
December 6	3:30 pm	vs. No. 14 Texas A&M	No. 2	Alamodome; San Antonio, TX (Big 12 Championship Game)	ABC	W 54–15	64,824	
January 2, 1998	7:00 pm	vs. No. 3 Tennessee*	No. 2	Pro Player Stadium; Miami Gardens, Florida (Orange Bowl, College GameDay)	CBS	W 42–17	74,002	
*Non-conference game; ^{†}Homecoming; Rankings from AP Poll released prior to the game; All times are in Central time

== Rankings ==
Ranking movements Legend: ██ Increase in ranking ██ Decrease in ranking
	Week																	
Poll	Pre	1	2	3	4	5	6	7	8	9	10	11	12	13	14	15	16	Final
AP	6	6	6	6	7	3	3	3	2	1	1	1	3	3	2	2	2	2
Coaches	6		6	5	6	3	3	3	2	1	1	1	3	3	2	2	2	1

== Game summaries ==
=== Akron ===
Akron at Nebraska

Team	1	2	3	4	Total
Akron	0	0	7	7	14
• Nebraska	14	24	14	7	59

- Date: 1997-08-30
- Location: Memorial Stadium, Lincoln, Nebraska
- Game attendance: 75,126

=== UCF ===
UCF at Nebraska

Team	1	2	3	4	Total
UCF	7	10	0	7	24
• Nebraska	0	14	17	7	38

- Date: 1997-09-13
- Location: Memorial Stadium, Lincoln, Nebraska
- Game attendance: 75,327

=== Washington ===
Nebraska at Washington

Team	1	2	3	4	Total
• Nebraska	14	7	0	6	27
Washington	0	7	7	0	14

- Date: 1997-09-20
- Location: Husky Stadium, Seattle
- Game attendance: 74,023

=== Kansas State ===
Kansas State at Nebraska

Team	1	2	3	4	Total
Kansas State	6	0	6	14	26
• Nebraska	10	10	21	15	56

- Date: 1997-10-04
- Location: Memorial Stadium, Lincoln, Nebraska
- Game attendance: 75,856

=== Baylor ===
Nebraska at Baylor

Team	1	2	3	4	Total
• Nebraska	14	28	7	0	49
Baylor	7	0	0	14	21

- Date: 1997-10-11
- Location: Floyd Casey Stadium, Waco, Texas
- Game attendance: 38,175

=== Texas Tech ===
Texas Tech at Nebraska

Team	1	2	3	4	Total
Texas Tech	0	0	0	0	0
• Nebraska	3	10	9	7	29

- Date: 1997-10-18
- Location: Memorial Stadium, Lincoln, Nebraska
- Game attendance: 75,764

=== Kansas ===
Nebraska at Kansas

Team	1	2	3	4	Total
• Nebraska	7	14	0	14	35
Kansas	0	0	0	0	0

- Date: 1997-10-25
- Location: University of Kansas Memorial Stadium, Lawrence, Kansas
- Game attendance: 75,764

=== Oklahoma ===
Oklahoma at Nebraska

Team	1	2	3	4	Total
Oklahoma	0	0	7	0	7
• Nebraska	20	14	21	14	69

- Date: 1997-11-01
- Location: Memorial Stadium, Lincoln, Nebraska
- Game attendance: 75,926

=== Missouri ===
Nebraska at Missouri

Team	1	2	3	4	OT	Total
• Nebraska	14	7	7	10	7	45
Missouri	7	17	7	7	0	38

- Date: 1997-11-08
- Location: Faurot Field, Columbia, Missouri
- Game attendance: 66,846

=== Iowa State ===
Iowa State at Nebraska

Team	1	2	3	4	Total
Iowa State	7	0	0	7	14
• Nebraska	35	28	7	7	77

- Date: 1997-11-15
- Location: Memorial Stadium, Lincoln, Nebraska
- Game attendance: 75,613

=== Colorado ===
Nebraska at Colorado

Team	1	2	3	4	Total
• Nebraska	3	7	17	0	27
Colorado	0	3	7	14	24

- Date: 1997-11-28
- Location: Folsom Field, Boulder, Colorado
- Game attendance: 52,738

=== Texas A&M ===
Texas A&M vs Nebraska

Team	1	2	3	4	Total
Texas A&M	0	3	0	12	15
• Nebraska	16	21	3	14	54

- Date: 1997-12-06
- Location: Alamodome, San Antonio, Texas
- Game attendance: 64,824

=== Tennessee ===
Tennessee vs Nebraska

Team	1	2	3	4	Total
Tennessee	0	3	6	8	17
• Nebraska	7	7	21	7	42

- Date: 1998-01-02
- Location: Pro Player Stadium, Miami Gardens, Florida
- Game attendance: 72,385

== Personnel ==
=== Roster ===
1997 Nebraska Cornhuskers football team roster
Players
Coaches
Offense

Pos.	#	Name	Class
IB	38	Dan Alexander	RFr
OL		Steve Altstadt	Fr
OT	70	Eric Anderson	Sr
TE	94	Travis Antholz	So
WB	82	Sean Applegate	So
C	52	Matt Baldwin	So
G	76	Sasho Becvarovski	RFr
SE	20	Tom Beveridge	RFr
WB	14	Lance Brown	Jr
IB	36	Correll Buckhalter	Fr
TE	90	Tim Carpenter	Sr
SE	6	Kenny Cheatham	Jr
QB	9	Monte Christo	Jr
OT	68	Jeff Clausen	So
FB	42	Josh Cobb	Jr
WB		Ben Cornelsen	Fr
WB	92	Tyler Cotten	Fr
QB	11	Eric Crouch	Fr
SE	3	Matt Davison	Fr
TE	85	T.J. DeBates	So
SE	26	Luke Denney	Fr
OT	55	Billy Diekmann	RFr
SE	2	J.R. Edwards	So
IB	4	DeAngelo Evans	So
WB	12	Demond Finister	So
SE	83	Craig Fischer	So
SE	29	Pat Friesen	Fr
QB	7	Scott Frost	Sr
WB	84	Paul Fujan	Fr
OT	74	Lonnie Fulton	So
SE	10	Mike Gentile	RFr
G	72	Ben Gessford	Jr
WB	8	John Gibson	RFr
IB	27	Marcus Giles	Fr
FB	46	Nick Gragert	Fr
IB	30	Ahman Green	Jr
OL	46	Mike Green	Fr
SE	80	Billy Haafke	Jr
G	78	Aaron Havlovic	So
OT	51	Kyle Henson	Jr
C	59	Josh Heskew	Jr
G	75	Russ Hochstein	RFr
G	62	Matt Hoskinson	Sr
TE	88	Sheldon Jackson	Jr
TE	34	Vershan Jackson	Sr
G	56	Marcus Johnson	So
SE	18	Nate Johnson	Fr
WB		Jordan Jones	Fr
OT	69	Adam Julch	So
FB	22	Ben Kingston	So
TE	87	Chad Kobus	So
OL	76	Kyle Kollmorgen	Fr
SE	89	Jeff (Robert) Lake	Sr
FB	40	Billy Legate	Jr
QB	1	Frankie London	So
FB	45	Joel Makovicka	Jr
TE	41	Jake McKee	RFr
FB	32	Willie Miller	RFr
TE	81	John Murphy	Fr
QB/WB	12	Bobby Newcombe	Fr
IB	37	Jason Olnes	So
IB	36	Hank Piening	RFr
OT	73	Fred Pollack	Sr
OT	57	Ryan Preister	Fr
C	58	Dominic Raiola	Fr
OL		Buck Rasmussen	Fr
TE	86	Dorrick Roy	Jr
QB	16	Jay Runty	RFr
G	50	Jon Rutherford	Fr
G	79	Chris Saalfeld	RFr
FB	21	Matt Schoening	RFr
OT	65	Jason Schwab	So
C	54	Doug Seaman	Sr
G	63	James Sherman	So
IB	31	James Sims	Sr
IB	25	Travis Soucie	RFr
FB	43	Jeremy Stanislav	RFr
OT	95	Jim Tansey	So
G	67	Aaron Taylor	Sr
OT	71	Mike Van Cleave	Sr
WB	26	Casey Vanderhoef	Fr
OL	57	Dave Volk	Fr
G	61	Brandt Wade	Jr
IB	24	Dan White	Fr
WB	33	Sean Wieting	Sr
WB	5	Shevin Wiggins	So
QB	3	Chad Wiles	RFr
TE	81	Tracey Wistrom	Fr
G	64	Jon Zatechka	Sr

Defense

Pos.	#	Name	Class
DT	95	Derek Allen	So
DT	89	Luis Almanzar	RFr
CB	28	Josh Anderson	RFr
WLB	40	Erick Arens	So
WLB	36	Rod Baker	Fr
RE	87	Chris Bassett	Sr
CB	24	Jason Benes	Sr
DB	7	Mic Boettner	Fr
DB	14	Dion Booker	Fr
ROV	21	Mike Brown	So
CB	22	Ralph Brown	So
MLB	39	Ben Buettenback	So
LB	56	Grant Bunton	Fr
LB	48	Jamie Burrow	Fr
LB	15	Jon Coyne	Fr
SLB	54	Chris Deitloff	Fr
DB		Damian Demps	Fr
ROV	17	George Dittrick	RFr
DT	58	Brandon Drum	Jr
DT	61	Jason Dush	RFr
FS	33	Mitch Ebke	Fr
FS		John Eisenberg	So
FS	19	Clint Finley	RFr
FS	5	Eric Fischer	RFr
MLB	44	Jay Foreman	Jr
SLB	34	Russell Froehlich	Jr
CB	18	Jay Gates	Sr
DT	77	Bobby Gill	So
RE	75	Matt Grummert	Fr
LB	53	Chris Gustafson	Fr
FS	45	Brad Hamik	RFr
CB	2	Brandon Harrison	Jr
SLB	49	Quint Hogrefe	Jr
DB	27	Matt Ickes	Fr
WLB	50	Julius Jackson	So
WLB	1	Eric Johnson	Jr
DT	88	Dave Jones	Sr
DT	91	Loran Kaiser	RFr
RE	57	Chad Kelsay	Jr
WLB	47	Josh Kohl	So
RE	82	Curt Lenners	Sr
ROV	29	Gregg List	So
ROV	6	Kalin Makaiwi	Jr
DT	97	Glen Matthews	Jr
DT	86	Jason McCullough	Jr
WLB	4	Octavious McFarlin	Sr
DT	76	Matt McGinn	Fr
FS	26	Greg McGraw	So
LB	38	Levi Mehl	Fr
DT	78	Tom Milius	So
RE	93	Brandon Mooberry	RFr
SLB	37	Tony Ortiz	So
LB	41	Jon Penny	Fr
DT	55	Jason Peter	Sr
CB	11	Jerome Peterson	So
MLB	13	Carlos Polk	RFr
ROV	10	Brandon Quindt	RFr
SLB	23	Steve Raymond	So
CB	9	Khari Reynolds	RFr
LB	34	Brandon Roth	Fr
RE	84	Mike Rucker	Jr
RE	80	Eric Ryan	So
SLB	46	Brian Shaw	So
RE	76	Scott Siebenborn	RFr
LB	35	Ryan Svoboda	Fr
CB	16	Erwin Swiney	Fr
LB	31	Nick Terrio	Fr
DT	79	Ross Tessendorf	Jr
DB	20	Alik Tillery	Fr
RE	92	Travis Toline	Jr
DB	12	Arion Turner	Fr
MLB	48	Chad Tuttle	RFr
MLB	56	Noland Urban	RFr
LB	83	Simon Van Boening	Fr
RE	83	Kyle Vanden Bosch	Fr
LB	52	Mark Vedral	Fr
CB	27	Joe Walker	Fr
DT	94	Brian Walters	Fr
FS	32	Eric Walther	Jr
RE	90	Brandon Wardyn	Fr
FS	3	Eric Warfield	Sr
DT	96	Steve Warren	So
ROV	42	Troy Watchorn	RFr
LB	85	J.P. (John Paul) Wichmann	Fr
RE	81	Aaron Wills	So
DT	99	Jason Wiltz	Jr
RE	98	Grant Wistrom	Sr
DB	10	Wes Woodward	Fr
RE	38	Brendan Zahl	Sr

Special teams

Pos.	#	Name	Class
PK	35	Kris Brown	Jr
PK	12	Dan Hadenfeldt	So
P	19	Jesse Kosch	Sr
P	23	Bill Lafleur	Jr
PK	28	Chace Long	Fr
P	9	Brian Morro	Jr
PK	13	Ted Retzlaff	Sr
P/PK	16	Chuck Tack	Fr

Head coach

- Tom Osborne
  25th season
  34th year at Nebraska
  Alma mater: Hastings College

Coordinators/assistant coaches

- Charlie McBride
  17th season as DC/DL coach
  21st year at Nebraska
  Alma mater: Colorado
- Turner Gill
  6th season as QB coach
  6th year at Nebraska
  Alma mater: Nebraska
- Craig Bohl
  3rd season as LB coach
  6th year at Nebraska
  Alma mater: Nebraska
- Ron Brown
  11th season as WR/TE coach
  11th year at Nebraska
  Alma mater: Brown
- Dan Young
  15th season as OL/K coach
  15th year at Nebraska
  Alma mater: Reed
- Milt Tenopir
  24th season as OL coach
  24th year at Nebraska
  Alma mater: Sterling
- Nelson Barnes
  1st season as RE coach
  1st year at Nebraska
  Alma mater: North Texas
- George Darlington
  DB coach
  25th year at Nebraska
  Alma mater: Rutgers
- Frank Solich
  15th season as RB coach
  19th year at Nebraska
  Alma mater: Nebraska
- Boyd Epley
  29th season as S&C coach
  29th year at Nebraska
  Alma mater: Nebraska

Legend

- (C) Team captain
- (S) Suspended
- (I) Ineligible
- Injured
- Redshirt

Roster
Last update: 2011-01-17

=== Depth chart ===
Defense

FS
Eric Warfield
Clint Finley
Eric Walther

WILL	MIKE	SAM
Octavious McFarlin	Jay Foreman	Brian Shaw
Eric Johnson	Carlos Polk	Tony Ortiz
Juiles Jackson	Ben Buettenback	Quint Hogrefe

ROVER
Mike Brown
Brandon Quindt
Gregg List

CB
Erwin Swiney
Joe Walker
Brandon Harrison

DE	DT	DT	DE
Grant Wistrom	Jason Peter	Jason Wiltz	Chad Kelsay; Mike Rucker
Travis Toline	Brandon Drum	Steve Warren	Kyle Vanden Bosch
Aaron Wills	Loran Kaiser	Derek Allen	Brandon Mooberry

CB
Ralph Brown
Jerome Peterson
Khari Reynolds

Offense

WR
Kenny Cheatham
Jeff Lake
Matt Davison
Billy Haafke

LT	LG	C	RG	RT
Fred Pollack	Aaron Taylor	Josh Heskew	Jon Zatechka	Eric Anderson
Adam Julch	Matt Hoskinson; James Sherman	Matt Hoskinson	Matt Hoskinson; Ben Gessford	Jason Schwab
Mike V Cleave	Brandt Wade	Matt Baldwin	Russ Hochstein	Jeff Clausen

TE
Vershan Jackson
Tim Carpenter
Sheldon Jackson
T.J DeBates

WR
Lance Brown
Bobby Newcombe
Shevin Wiggins
⋅

QB
Scott Frost
Frankie London
Monte Christo

RB
Ahman Green
Correll Buckhalter
James Sims
Dan Alexander

FB
Joel Machovicka
Billy Legate
Willie Miller
Josh Cobb

Special teams
PK Kris Brown
P Jesse Kosch
KR Shevin Wiggins
Joe Walker
PR Bobby Newcombe

== Statistics ==
- QB Scott Frost: 88/159 (55.3%) for 1,237 yards (7.80) with 5 TD vs. 4 INT (2.52%). 176 carries for 1,095 yards (6.22) and 19 TD.
- RB Ahman Green: 278 carries for 1,877 yards (6.75) with 22 TD. 16 catches for 151 yards and 0 TD.
- FB Joel Makovicka: 105 carries for 685 yards (6.52) and 9 TD.
- RB Correll Buckhalter: 54 carries for 311 yards (5.76) and 6 TD.
- WR Lance Brown: 12 catches for 226 yards (18.83) and 0 TD.
- WR Matt Davison: 10 catches for 219 yards (21.90) and 1 TD.

== After the season ==
Nebraska Head Coach Tom Osborne announced his retirement just prior to the 1998 Orange bowl, capping a remarkable career of success. The #2 Cornhuskers handily defeated the #3 Tennessee Volunteers 42–17, while #1 Michigan defeated #7 Washington State team 21–16. In postgame coverage on the field, Nebraska quarterback Scott Frost openly lobbied Coaches Poll voters for support based on performance comparisons between Nebraska and Michigan. The voters apparently agreed, as Nebraska was ranked #1 in the final Coaches Poll, while Michigan retained their pre-bowl #1 ranking in the AP Poll, creating a split National Championship. The 1997 Huskers set an NCAA record that still stands by scoring an average of 5.5 rushing touchdowns per game (66 rushing touchdowns in twelve games, not including the six scored in the Orange Bowl).

=== Awards ===
Award	Name(s)
Lombardi Award	Grant Wistrom
Outland Trophy	Aaron Taylor
Big 12 Male Athlete of the Year	Grant Wistrom
All-America 1st team	Jason Peter, Aaron Taylor, Grant Wistrom
All-America 2nd team	Ahman Green
All-America 3rd team	Eric Anderson
All-Big 12 1st team	Eric Anderson, Mike Brown, Ralph Brown, Scott Frost, Ahman Green, Jason Peter, Aaron Taylor, Grant Wistrom
All-Big 12 2nd team	Jay Foreman
All-Big 12 3rd team	Josh Heskew, Chad Kelsay, Eric Warfield, Jon Zatechka
All-Big 12 honorable mention	Kris Brown, Jesse Kosch, Joel Makovicka, Fred Pollack, Mike Rucker, Jason Wiltz

=== NFL and pro players ===
The following Nebraska players who participated in the 1997 season later moved on to the next level and joined a professional or semi-pro team as draftees or free agents.

Name	Team
Dan Alexander	Tennessee Titans
Eric Anderson	Amsterdam Admirals
Kris Brown	Pittsburgh Steelers
Mike Brown	Chicago Bears
Ralph Brown	New York Giants
Correll Buckhalter	Philadelphia Eagles
Eric Crouch	St. Louis Rams
Clint Finley	Kansas City Chiefs
Jay Foreman	Buffalo Bills
Scott Frost	New York Jets
Ahman Green	Seattle Seahawks
Russ Hochstein	Tampa Bay Buccaneers
Sheldon Jackson	Buffalo Bills
Vershan Jackson	Kansas City Chiefs
Eric Johnson	Oakland Raiders
Chad Kelsay	Pittsburgh Steelers
Bill Lafleur	Barcelona Dragons
Joel Makovicka	Arizona Cardinals
Bobby Newcombe	Montreal Alouettes
Tony Ortiz	Scottish Claymores
Jason Peter	Carolina Panthers
Carlos Polk	San Diego Chargers
Dominic Raiola	Detroit Lions
Mike Rucker	Carolina Panthers
Erwin Swiney	Green Bay Packers
Larry Townsend	Berlin Thunder
Kyle Vanden Bosch	Arizona Cardinals
Joe Walker	Tennessee Titans
Eric Warfield	Kansas City Chiefs
Steve Warren	Green Bay Packers
Jason Wiltz	New York Jets
Grant Wistrom	St. Louis Rams
Jon Zatechka	Berlin Thunder
