= 1996 All-SEC football team =

American college football all-star team

The 1996 All-SEC football team consists of American football players selected to the All-Southeastern Conference (SEC) chosen by various selectors for the 1996 NCAA Division I-A football season.

The Florida Gators won the conference, beating the Alabama Crimson Tide 45 to 30 in the SEC Championship game. The Gators then won the national championship, defeating the Florida State Seminoles 52 to 20 in the Sugar Bowl.

Florida quarterback Danny Wuerffel repeated as SEC Player of the Year.

== Offensive selections ==
=== Quarterbacks ===
- Danny Wuerffel, Florida (AP-1, FN)
- Peyton Manning, Tennessee (AP-2)

=== Running backs ===
- Kevin Faulk, LSU (AP-1)
- Duce Staley, South Carolina (AP-1)
- Dennis Riddle, Alabama (AP-2)
- Robert Edwards, Georgia (AP-2)

=== Wide receivers ===
- Reidel Anthony, Florida (AP-1)
- Joey Kent, Tennessee (AP-1)
- Hines Ward, Georgia (AP-2)
- Ike Hilliard, Florida (AP-2, FN)

=== Centers ===
- Jeff Mitchell, Florida (AP-1, FN)
- John Causey, Alabama (AP-2)

=== Guards ===
- Alan Faneca, LSU (AP-1)
- Donnie Young, Florida (AP-1, FN)
- Victor Riley, Auburn (AP-2)
- Will Friend, Alabama (AP-2)

=== Tackles ===
- Adam Meadows, Georgia (AP-1)
- Brent Smith, Miss. St. (AP-1)
- Jamar Nesbit, South Carolina (AP-1)
- Randy Wheeler, South Carolina (AP-2)
- Ben Bordelon, LSU (AP-2)

=== Tight ends ===
- David LaFleur, LSU (AP-1)
- Kris Mangum, Ole Miss (AP-2)

== Defensive selections ==
=== Defensive ends ===
- Leonard Little, Tennessee (AP-1)
- Michael Myers, Alabama (AP-1)
- Chris Hood, Alabama (AP-2)
- Chris Ward, Kentucky (AP-2)

=== Defensive tackles ===
- Ed Chester, Florida (AP-1, FN)
- Chuck Wiley, LSU (AP-1)
- Booger McFarland, LSU (AP-2)
- Jason Ferguson, Georgia (AP-2)

=== Linebackers ===
- Dwayne Rudd, Alabama (AP-1)
- Takeo Spikes, Auburn (AP-1)
- Jamie Duncan, Vanderbilt (AP-1)
- James Bates, Florida (AP-1)
- Paul Lacoste, Miss. St. (AP-2)
- Ralph Staten, Alabama (AP-2)
- Greg Bright, Georgia (AP-2)

=== Cornerbacks ===
- Anthone Lott, Florida (AP-1, FN)
- Deshea Townsend, Alabama (AP-1)
- Terry Fair, Tennessee (AP-2)
- Fred Weary, Florida (AP-2, FN)

=== Safeties ===
- Kevin Jackson, Alabama (AP-1)
- Lawrence Wright, Florida (AP-1)
- Van Hiles, Kentucky (AP-2)
- Arturo Freeman, South Carolina (AP-2)
- Corey Johnson, Georgia (AP-2)

== Special teams ==
=== Kickers ===
- Jaret Holmes, Auburn (AP-1)
- Jeff Hall, Tennessee (AP-2)

=== Punters ===
- Bill Marinangel, Vanderbilt (AP-1)
- Andy Russ, Miss. St. (AP-2)

=== Return specialist ===
- Terry Fair, Tennessee (AP-1)
- John Avery, Ole Miss (AP-2)

== Key ==
AP = Associated Press

FN = Football News

== See also ==
- 1996 College Football All-America Team
