= Tim Beauchamp =

American football player (born 1977)

No. 93
- Position: Defensive end

Personal information
- Born: March 18, 1977 (age 49); New Smyrna Beach, Florida
- Listed height: 6 ft 2 in (1.88 m)
- Listed weight: 260 lb (118 kg)

Career information
- High school: New Smyrna Beach
- College: Florida
- NFL draft: 1999: undrafted

Career history
- Cleveland Browns (1999)*; Green Bay Packers (2000)*; Amsterdam Admirals (2000); New York/New Jersey Hitmen (2001); Hamilton Tiger-Cats (2001)
- * Offseason or practice squad member only

Awards and highlights
- National champion (1996); Second-team All-SEC (1997)

Timothy Ryan Beauchamp (born March 18, 1977) is an American former professional football player who was a defensive end. Beauchamp played college football for the Florida Gators, where he was a member of the 1996 national championship team. He went on to sign contracts with the Cleveland Browns and Green Bay Packers before playing in NFL Europe, the XFL, and the CFL.

== Amateur career ==
Beauchamp played linebacker at New Smyrna Beach High School and was recruited by Steve Spurrier to play college football for Florida. He also set a state record for the clean and jerk, lifting 310 pounds in the 219-pound weight class.

Beauchamp was a member of the 1995 Florida team that won the SEC and went 12–0 before losing the 1996 Fiesta Bowl to Nebraska.

As a sophomore in 1996, Beauchamp started every single game and led the team with 7 sacks. He also started during the 1997 Sugar Bowl, which was the designated national championship game. He recorded a tackle and a pass breakup as Florida won their first national championship over arch-rivals Florida State.

For 1997, Beauchamp arrived at camp 15 pounds over his target weight and only played 4 games during the season, recording only 11 tackles. He also saw time playing defensive tackle following an injury to starter Ed Chester. He played in the 1998 Citrus Bowl. Despite his struggles, he was selected to the 1997 All-SEC second team.

In 4 years at Florida, Beauchamp played in 44 games and recorded 12.5 sacks, 3 forced fumbles, 40 solo tackles, and 69 total tackles. He earned letterman status during all four of his years in college.

== Professional career ==
After going undrafted in the 1999 NFL draft, Beauchamp signed a contract with the Cleveland Browns on April 23, 1999. He was waived on August 26, 1999.

Beauchamp signed a contract with the Green Bay Packers on June 29, 2000, before being waived on August 27, 2000, at the end of the preseason.

Beauchamp signed a contract to play in NFL Europe for the Amsterdam Admirals during the 2000 season. He played in 9 out of 10 possible games, recording 6.5 sacks. In 2001, he signed a contract with the New York/New Jersey Hitmen of the XFL, where he found success. He appeared in all 10 games and earned 3 sacks and 27 tackles. He played one game for the Hamilton Tiger-Cats of the CFL in 2001 before retiring from football.

== Personal life ==
In 1999, Sean Alfortish was charged with a felony count of unlicensed athletic agent activity for giving money to Beauchamp while he was still a collegiate player. Alfortish was later disbarred in 2014 and in 2025 was charged with obstruction of justice, staging car accidents, and murder of a federal witness.

As of 2018, Beauchamp serves as a corrections officer in Daytona Beach, Florida.
