= Jeff Mitchell =

American football player (born 1974)

No. 60
- Position: Center

Personal information
- Born: January 29, 1974 (age 52); Dallas, Texas, U.S.
- Listed height: 6 ft 4 in (1.93 m)
- Listed weight: 300 lb (136 kg)

Career information
- High school: Countryside (Clearwater, Florida)
- College: Florida
- NFL draft: 1997: 5th round, 134th overall pick

Career history
- Baltimore Ravens (1997–2000); Carolina Panthers (2001–2005)

Awards and highlights
- Super Bowl champion (XXXV); Bowl Alliance national champion (1996); Third-team All-American (1996); First-team All-SEC (1996)

Career NFL statistics
- Games played: 119
- Games started: 118
- Fumble recoveries: 2
- Stats at Pro Football Reference

Jeffrey Clay Mitchell (born January 29, 1974) is an American former professional football player who was a center in the National Football League (NFL) for nine seasons during the 1990s and 2000s. Mitchell played college football for the Florida Gators, where he was a member of a national championship team. Thereafter, he played professionally for the Baltimore Ravens and the Carolina Panthers of the NFL.

== Early life ==
Mitchell was born in Dallas, Texas in 1974. He attended Countryside High School in Clearwater, Florida, and played defensive tackle for the Countryside Cougars high school football team. Mitchell set a school career record with seventeen quarterback sacks and earned an honorable mention from USA Today, and garnered All-State Class 5A first-team honors. Mitchell was named the county player of the year by the Tampa Tribune and All-Suncoast Defensive Player of the Year by the St. Petersburg Times. He is the older brother of former NFL defensive end Clint Mitchell.

== College career ==
Mitchell accepted an athletic scholarship to attend the University of Florida in Gainesville, Florida, where he played for coach Steve Spurrier's Florida Gators football team from 1992 to 1996. As a true freshman in 1992, the Gators coaching staff decided to redshirt him. During his four seasons as a Gator, Mitchell was a starter for three seasons and the Gators won four consecutive Southeastern Conference (SEC) titles in 1993 through 1996 and the Bowl Alliance national championship in 1996. Mitchell earned academic honors for four consecutive seasons. As a senior team captain in 1996, he started eight games at center for the Gators' offense that averaged 503.9 yards per game. As a junior in 1995, he was a first-team All-SEC selection by Football News. During his junior year, he started every game at center and was named the team's Comeback Player of the Year after missing spring practice following arthroscopic surgery. In the 1996 game against the Georgia Bulldogs, he suffered a broken right ankle, forcing him to undergo surgery and ending his season.

In one of a series of articles published in 2006, the sportswriters of The Gainesville Sun rated him as the No. 41 all-time greatest Gator from the first century of Florida football.

== Professional career ==
The Baltimore Ravens selected Mitchell in the fifth round (134th pick overall) in the 1997 NFL draft. He played for the Ravens for four seasons from 1997 to 2000. He saw no action as a rookie in 1997, but became a regular starter in 1998. Mitchell earned a Super Bowl ring with the Baltimore Ravens in 2000, starting at center for the Ravens in their victory against the New York Giants in Super Bowl XXXV.

Mitchell was the veteran anchor on the Carolina offensive line for five years, from 2001 to 2005. He led the Panthers offensive line that allowed only twenty-six sacks in 2003, a team record for fewest sacks allowed in a season, and helped Panthers rush for a team-record 2,091 yards, including a team-individual mark of 1,444 yards by Stephen Davis. Mitchell joined Jordan Gross as the only Panthers offensive linemen to start every game in 2004.

Mitchell was a starter in 118 of 119 regular season NFL contests in which he appeared during his eight-year professional football career.

During the off-seasons, Mitchell served as the Vice President of Client Relations for Threadfin Business Solutions. He currently holds that position on a full-time basis.

== See also ==
- Florida Gators football, 1990–99
- List of Carolina Panthers players
- List of Florida Gators football All-Americans
- List of Florida Gators in the NFL draft
