= 1998 Florida Citrus Bowl =

American college football game

1998 CompUSA Florida Citrus Bowl
Penn State Nittany Lions	Florida Gators
(9–2)	(9–2)
Big Ten	SEC
6	21
Head coach: Joe Paterno	Head coach: Steve Spurrier
AP / Coaches / BA; 11 / 12 / 11	AP / Coaches / BA; 6 / 8 / 7
	1	2	3	4	Total
Penn State	0	3	3	0	6
Florida	14	0	0	7	21
- Date: January 1, 1998
- Season: 1997
- Stadium: Florida Citrus Bowl
- Location: Orlando, Florida
- MVP: RB Fred Taylor (Florida)
- Attendance: 72,940

United States TV coverage
- Network: ABC
- Announcers: Brad Nessler; Gary Danielson

The 1998 Florida Citrus Bowl featured the Florida Gators and the Penn State Nittany Lions.

== Background ==
Penn State was ranked #1 for the first three weeks of the season and were 7–0 before losing to eventual national champion Michigan. They won two of their last three games but ultimately finished tied for second in the Big Ten Conference. The defending national champion Gators were ranked #1 for three weeks in the season as well, though two losses to LSU and Georgia within two weeks of each other knocked Florida out of the contention for the Southeastern Conference title, though they finished the regular season in the AP top 10 for the fifth straight year. This was both Florida and Penn State's third appearance.

== Game summary ==
Noah Brindise gave Florida a 7–0 lead on a touchdown sneak after an 80-yard drive that took only 4:12 and had Fred Taylor contribute 47 yards of rushing. While trying to respond, Mike McQueary's pass was intercepted by Fred Weary and returned to the 35. Doug Johnson followed with a touchdown pass to Jacquez Green to make it 14–0 a few plays later. Travis Forney made it 14–3 after a field goal set up by a Johnson interception. Midway through the third quarter, Forney made it 14–6 on his second kick. After Johnson's injury to his shoulder, Jesse Palmer stepped in as quarterback and led Florida to an early fourth quarter touchdown pass to Green to make the final score 21–6 as Penn State was stifled by the defense of Florida. McQueary went 10 of 32 for 92 yards and 3 interceptions while Penn State had only one yard of rushing in the first half en route to only 47 the whole day. Fred Taylor ended his career at Florida with the most rushing yards in Citrus Bowl history, rushing for 234 yards on 43 carries.

== Aftermath ==
Florida has returned to the Citrus Bowl in 2000, 2008 and 2016, while Penn State did so in 2003 and 2010.

== Statistics ==
Statistics	Florida	Penn State
First downs	23	9
Yards rushing	254	47
Yards passing	143	92
Total yards	397	139
Possession Time	35:07	24:53
Fumbles-Lost	1-1	0-0
Interceptions	2	3
Penalties-Yards	5-45	1–5
