= Anthone Lott =

American football player (born 1974)

No. 30
- Position: Cornerback

Personal information
- Born: July 22, 1974 (age 52); Gainesville, Florida, U.S.
- Listed height: 5 ft 9 in (1.75 m)
- Listed weight: 194 lb (88 kg)

Career information
- High school: William M. Raines (Jacksonville, Florida)
- College: Florida (1993–1996)
- NFL draft: 1997: undrafted

Career history
- Cincinnati Bengals (1997); Indianapolis Colts (1997)*
- * Offseason or practice squad member only

Awards and highlights
- National champion (1996); 2× First-team All-SEC (1995, 1996)

Career NFL statistics
- Games played: 5
- Tackles: 1
- Fumble recoveries: 1
- Stats at Pro Football Reference

Anthone Vouchan Lott (born July 22, 1974) is an American former professional football cornerback who played for the Cincinnati Bengals of the National Football League (NFL). He played college football for the Florida Gators.

== Early life ==
Lott was born on July 22, 1974, in Gainesville, Florida. He attended William M. Raines High School in Jacksonville, Florida.

== College career ==
Lott played college football for the Florida Gators from 1993 to 1996 and was a four-year letterman. In 47 games, Lott had nine interceptions for 182 yards and one touchdown. He had four tackles and one pass break up in the 1997 Sugar Bowl as Florida was named national champion. Lott earned first-team All-SEC honors in 1995 and 1996.

== Professional career ==
=== Cincinnati Bengals ===
After going undrafted in the 1997 NFL draft, Lott signed with the Cincinnati Bengals as an undrafted free agent. He made the 53-man roster and played in five games for the team, recording one tackle and fumble recovery. On October 21, Lott was waived by the team.

=== Indianapolis Colts ===
On November 26, 1997, Lott was signed to the practice squad of the Indianapolis Colts.
