= Reggie McGrew =

American football player (born 1976)

No. 92
- Position: Defensive tackle

Personal information
- Born: December 16, 1976 (age 49); Mayo, Florida, U.S.
- Listed height: 6 ft 1 in (1.85 m)
- Listed weight: 312 lb (142 kg)

Career information
- High school: Mayo (FL) Lafayette Co.
- College: Florida
- NFL draft: 1999: 1st round, 24th overall pick

Career history
- San Francisco 49ers (1999–2001); Atlanta Falcons (2002); Jacksonville Jaguars (2003)*; Washington Redskins (2004)*
- * Offseason or practice squad member only

Awards and highlights
- Bowl Alliance national champion (1996); First-team All-SEC (1998)
- Stats at Pro Football Reference

Reginald Gerard McGrew (born December 16, 1976) is an American former professional football player who was a defensive tackle in the National Football League (NFL) for four seasons during the late 1990s and early 2000s. McGrew played college football for the University of Florida, and thereafter, he played professionally for the San Francisco 49ers and the Atlanta Falcons of the NFL.

== Early life ==
McGrew was born in Mayo, Florida. He attended Lafayette High School in Mayo, and played high school football for the Lafayette Hornets.

== College career ==
McGrew accepted an athletic scholarship to attend the University of Florida in Gainesville, Florida, where he played for coach Steve Spurrier's Florida Gators football team from 1996 to 1998. The Gators coaching staff decided to redshirt him in 1995, and he subsequently became a starter on the Gators defensive line and was a member of the 1996 Gators team that defeated the Florida State Seminoles 52–20 in the Sugar Bowl to win the Bowl Alliance national championship. He received first-team All-Southeastern Conference (SEC) honors following his junior season in 1998, and he decided to forgo his final season of NCAA eligibility and entered the NFL draft.

After McGrew's NFL career was over, he returned to Gainesville to complete his bachelor's degree in sociology in 2010.

== Professional career ==
The San Francisco 49ers selected McGrew in first round (24th pick overall) in the 1999 NFL draft. He played for the 49ers for three seasons from 1999 to 2001.

He missed his rookie season in 1999, having torn his triceps tendon. However, McGrew played in twenty-four NFL games over the following three seasons. McGrew played his fourth and final NFL season for the Atlanta Falcons in 2002.

== See also ==
- Florida Gators
- Florida Gators football, 1990–99
- List of Florida Gators in the NFL draft
- List of San Francisco 49ers first-round draft picks
- List of University of Florida alumni
