= Mike Peterson =

American football player and coach (born 1976)

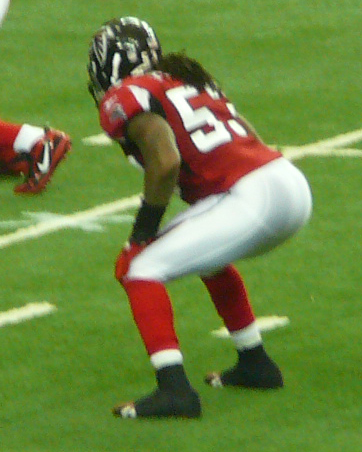
- Peterson with the Atlanta Falcons in 2009

Florida Gators
- Title: Outside linebackers coach

Personal information
- Born: June 17, 1976 (age 50); Gainesville, Florida, U.S.
- Listed height: 6 ft 1 in (1.85 m)
- Listed weight: 226 lb (103 kg)

Career information
- High school: Santa Fe (Alachua, Florida)
- College: Florida
- NFL draft: 1999: 2nd round, 36th overall pick

Career history

Playing
- Indianapolis Colts (1999–2002); Jacksonville Jaguars (2003–2008); Atlanta Falcons (2009–2012)

Coaching
- Florida (2013) Student assistant; Florida (2014–2015) Strength and conditioning coach; South Carolina (2016–2021) Outside linebackers coach; Florida (2022–present) Outside linebackers coach

Awards and highlights
- Second-team All-Pro (2005); NFL combined tackles leader (2000); NFL All-Rookie Team (1999); National champion (1996); First-team All-American (1998); Second-team All-SEC (1998); University of Florida Athletic Hall of Fame

Career NFL statistics
- Total tackles: 951
- Sacks: 21.5
- Forced fumbles: 8
- Interceptions: 19
- Pass deflections: 37
- Defensive touchdowns: 1
- Stats at Pro Football Reference

Porter Michael Peterson (born June 17, 1976) is an American football coach and former player. He is currently the outside linebackers coach at the University of Florida. He most recently was the outside linebackers coach at the University of South Carolina. Peterson played college football for the Florida Gators, where he was a member of a national championship team and earned first-team All-American honors. He was a second-round pick in the 1999 NFL draft and played professionally for thirteen seasons with the Indianapolis Colts, Jacksonville Jaguars and Atlanta Falcons of the National Football League (NFL). He is the older brother of former Chicago Bears running back Adrian Peterson.

== Early life ==
Peterson was born in Gainesville, Florida in 1976. He attended Santa Fe High School in nearby Alachua, Florida, where he played for the Santa Fe Raiders high school football team.

== College career ==
Peterson accepted an athletic scholarship to attend the University of Florida in Gainesville, Florida, and played for coach Steve Spurrier's Florida Gators football team from 1995 to 1998. He was a member of the 1996 Gators team that finished 12–1 and won the Bowl Alliance national championship by defeating the top-ranked Florida State Seminoles 52–20 in the Sugar Bowl. Peterson started twenty-four of forty-two games in which he played, posted 249 tackles, three forced fumbles, thirteen tackles for a loss and 8.5 sacks. As a senior team captain in 1998, he was a first-team All-Southeastern Conference (SEC) selection and a first-team All-American, and was selected as the Gators' most valuable player by his teammates.

Peterson was inducted into the University of Florida Athletic Hall of Fame as a "Gator Great" in 2011.

=== College awards and honors ===
- 2× SEC Championship (1995, 1996)
- Bowl Alliance National Championship (1996)
- First-team All-SEC (1998)
- First-team All-American (1998)
- University of Florida Athletic Hall of Fame

== Professional career ==
Pre-draft measurables
Height	Weight	Arm length	Hand span	40-yard dash	10-yard split	20-yard split	20-yard shuttle	Vertical jump	Broad jump	Bench press
6 ft 1 1/2 in (1.87 m)	233 lb (106 kg)	31 1/4 in (0.79 m)	9 1/8 in (0.23 m)	4.47 s	1.56 s	2.60 s	4.08 s	36.0 in (0.91 m)	9 ft 10 in (3.00 m)	18 reps
All values from NFL Combine

The Indianapolis Colts selected Peterson in the second round (36th overall) of the 1999 NFL draft. The Colts acquired the pick from the St. Louis Rams in exchange for Marshall Faulk.

He played for the Colts for four seasons from 1999 to 2002. Peterson also played for the Jacksonville Jaguars for the six seasons from 2003 to 2008 when he and coach Jack del Rio had a verbal altercation during a team meeting.

Peterson played for the Atlanta Falcons from 2009 to 2012. On March 13, 2012, he became an unrestricted free agent, but re-signed with the Falcons on July 23, 2012. Peterson again became an unrestricted free agent in 2013.

=== NFL awards and honors ===
- Second-team All-Pro (2005)

=== Coaching career ===
Upon retirement from the NFL, Peterson returned to the University of Florida in 2013 to complete his undergraduate degree. He first worked as an undergraduate assistant coach on the Gators strength and conditioning staff then took over as its coordinator in 2014 after graduating.

In 2016, Peterson was hired as outside linebackers coach on Will Muschamp's staff at South Carolina.

On January 5, 2022, Peterson was hired as outside linebackers coach on Billy Napier's staff at Florida.

== Personal life ==
Peterson is the older brother of former Chicago Bears running back Adrian Peterson and cousin of former NFL wide receiver Freddie Solomon. Peterson is married to his wife Chantal and they have two sons: Mike Jr. and Gavin.

Peterson and his wife established the Mike Peterson Foundation in 2004. The foundation was constituted in an attempt to support and benefit under-served youth and socio-economically challenged families in Peterson's hometown of Alachua, Florida and his NFL cities of Jacksonville and Atlanta. Since its inception, the Mike Peterson Foundation has already served over 15,000 youth and families through several community events and programs, most notably the Top Dog Readers Club literacy program at the Grove Park Elementary School in Atlanta.

== See also ==
- Florida Gators
- Florida Gators football, 1990–99
- List of Florida Gators football All-Americans
- List of Florida Gators in the NFL draft
- List of University of Florida Athletic Hall of Fame members
