= Jacquez Green =

American football player and coach (born 1976)

No. 12, 80, 81
- Position: Wide receiver

Personal information
- Born: January 15, 1976 (age 50); Fort Valley, Georgia, U.S.
- Listed height: 5 ft 9 in (1.75 m)
- Listed weight: 175 lb (79 kg)

Career information
- High school: Peach County (Fort Valley)
- College: Florida
- NFL draft: 1998: 2nd round, 34th overall pick

Career history

Playing
- Tampa Bay Buccaneers (1998–2001); Washington Redskins (2002); Detroit Lions (2002); Tampa Bay Buccaneers (2003)*
- * Offseason or practice squad member only

Coaching
- Gibbs(FL) HS (2007–2008) Offensive coordinator; Lincoln(FL) HS (2010-2012) Offensive coordinator; Valdosta(GA) HS (2014) Wide receivers coach; Lincoln(FL) HS (2015-2017) Offensive coordinator; Godby(FL) HS (2017-2018) Offensive coordinator; Manatee(FL) HS (2019-2021) Offensive coordinator; Manatee(FL) HS (2021-present) Head coach

Awards and highlights
- PFWA All-Rookie Team (1998); Bowl Alliance national champion (1996); Consensus All-American (1997); First-team All-SEC (1997)

Career NFL statistics
- Receptions: 162
- Receiving yards: 2,311
- Receiving touchdowns: 7
- Return yards: 1,315
- Return touchdowns: 2
- Stats at Pro Football Reference

D'Tanyian Jacquez "Quezi" Green (born January 15, 1976) is an American former professional football player who was a wide receiver and punt returner in the National Football League (NFL) for five seasons during the 1990s and early 2000s. Green played college football for the Florida Gators, earning consensus All-American honors in 1997. He was a second-round pick in the 1998 NFL draft, and played professionally for the Tampa Bay Buccaneers, the Washington Redskins and the Detroit Lions of the NFL.

== Early life ==
Green was born in Fort Valley, Georgia in 1976. He attended Peach County High School in Fort Valley, and was a member of the Peach County Trojans high school football, basketball, and track and field teams. Green received all-state honors in football and basketball as a senior, and was also selected to play in the annual Georgia vs. Florida High School All-Star football game. Green played quarterback throughout high school, except for his junior season when the Peach County Trojans lost in the state title game; that season he played wide receiver and running back. He was also a member of the Peach County Trojans' state championship 4x100-meter relay team as a junior.

== College career ==
Green accepted an athletic scholarship to attend the University of Florida in Gainesville, Florida, where he played wide receiver for coach Steve Spurrier's Florida Gators football team from 1995 to 1997. He was a three-year letterman and a member of the 1996 Gators' Bowl Alliance national championship team, when he had seven catches for seventy-nine yards in the Gators' 52–20 Sugar Bowl victory over the Florida State Seminoles. Against the Auburn Tigers in 1997, he scored a rare triple—throwing a touchdown pass, catching one and running for one. Green suffered a major injury when he dislocated his hip in the 1995 national championship game against the Nebraska Cornhuskers. He may best be remembered for a 58-yard reception from quarterback Doug Johnson late in the 1997 Florida-Florida State game that propelled the underdog Gators over the top-ranked Florida State Seminoles. He was a member of the Gators' Southeastern Conference (SEC) championship teams in 1995 and 1996, a first-team All-SEC selection and a consensus first-team All-American in 1997, and was one of the three finalists for the Biletnikoff Award. Green caught sixty-one passes for 1,024 yards and nine touchdowns as a junior before entering the NFL draft.

== Professional career ==
Pre-draft measurables
Height	Weight	Arm length	Hand span
5 ft 8 7/8 in (1.75 m)	173 lb (78 kg)	31 1/4 in (0.79 m)	8 1/2 in (0.22 m)

Green was a second-round draft choice (thirty-fourth pick overall) of the Tampa Bay Buccaneers in the 1998 NFL draft. He played for the Buccaneers for four seasons from 1998 to 2001. Green's most productive seasons as a wide receiver were 1999, when he caught 56 passes for 791 yards with three touchdowns (only ten starts), and 2000, when he had 51 receptions for 773 yards. Before the 2002 season, he signed as a free agent with the Washington Redskins and reunited with former Florida Gators and Buccaneers teammate Reidel Anthony. He was released by the Redskins and signed by the Detroit Lions. Prior to the 2003 season, he signed with his former team, the Buccaneers, and retired. He ended his NFL career starting 37 of the 66 games in which he played, registering 162 receptions for 2,311 yards and seven touchdowns.

== Life after the NFL ==
Green said that he played Madden NFL every day, and that "I want to make it to the NFL just to play in this [game] this right here. More than I want to play in the NFL". He won the annual Madden Bowl in 2001 and 2002. Green served as the offensive coordinator for Gibbs High School in St. Petersburg, Florida for two successful seasons, and was the associate head coach and offensive coordinator at Lincoln High School in Tallahassee, Florida. Green helped lead Lincoln to the 2010 state championship and a state runner-up performance in 2012.

Green spent one year at Valdosta High School in Valdosta, Georgia, as their wide receivers coach before returning to Lincoln High School for 3 more seasons. He was previously the offensive coordinator at Godby High School in Tallahassee, FL. Green helped with a resurgence at Godby High School, after winning 5 games the previous 2 seasons, the Godby Cougars went 10-2 during the 2017 season, and 23–3 over his two-year coaching stint.

In September 2017, Green was inducted into the University of Florida Football Hall of Fame.

Green was announced as the offensive coordinator for the Manatee High School Hurricanes in Bradenton, Florida on July 10, 2019. In May 2021, Green was named Head Coach of the Hurricanes.

== See also ==
- History of the Tampa Bay Buccaneers
- List of Detroit Lions players
- List of Florida Gators football All-Americans
- List of Florida Gators in the NFL draft
- List of Washington Redskins players
