= Johnny Rutledge =

American football player (born 1977)

No. 51, 58, 53
- Position: Linebacker

Personal information
- Born: January 4, 1977 (age 49); Belle Glade, Florida, U.S.
- Listed height: 6 ft 3 in (1.91 m)
- Listed weight: 239 lb (108 kg)

Career information
- High school: Glades Central (Belle Glade)
- College: Florida
- NFL draft: 1999: 2nd round, 51st overall pick

Career history
- Arizona Cardinals (1999–2002); Baltimore Ravens (2003)*; Denver Broncos (2003)
- * Offseason or practice squad member only

Awards and highlights
- Bowl Alliance national champion (1996); 2× Second-team All-SEC (1998, 1997)

Career NFL statistics
- Games played: 46
- Games started: 4
- Stats at Pro Football Reference

Johnny Boykins Rutledge, III (born January 4, 1977) is an American former professional football player who was a linebacker for five seasons in the National Football League (NFL) during the 1990s and 2000s. Rutledge played college football for the Florida Gators, and was a member of a national championship team. A second round pick in the 1999 NFL draft, he played professionally for the Arizona Cardinals and the Denver Broncos of the NFL.

== Early life ==
Rutledge was born in Belle Glade, Florida in 1977. He attended Glades Central High School in Belle Glade, where he played high school football for the Glades Central Raiders.

== College career ==
Rutledge accepted an athletic scholarship to attend the University of Florida in Gainesville, Florida, where he played for coach Steve Spurrier's Florida Gators football team from 1995 to 1998. He was a member of the 1996 Gators' team that defeated the Florida State Seminoles 52–20 in the Sugar Bowl for the Bowl Alliance national championship. He was a second-team All-Southeastern Conference (SEC) selection as a junior in 1997, and a first-team selection as a senior in 1998.

Rutledge later returned to Gainesville after his NFL career was over, and graduated from the University of Florida with a bachelor's degree in health and human performance in 2007.

== Professional career ==
The Arizona Cardinals selected Rutledge in the second round (fifty-first overall pick) in the 1999 NFL draft. He played for the Cardinals from 1999 to 2002. He played his final season with the Denver Broncos in 2003. In his five-season NFL career, Rutledge appeared in forty-six regular season games.

== See also ==
- Florida Gators football, 1990–99
- History of the Denver Broncos
- List of Florida Gators in the NFL draft
- List of University of Florida alumni
