= Terry Fair =

American football player and coach (born 1976)

No. 23, 28, 30
- Position: Cornerback

Personal information
- Born: July 20, 1976 (age 50); Phoenix, Arizona, U.S.
- Listed height: 5 ft 9 in (1.75 m)
- Listed weight: 185 lb (84 kg)

Career information
- High school: South Mountain (AZ)
- College: Tennessee
- NFL draft: 1998: 1st round, 20th overall pick

Career history

Playing
- Detroit Lions (1998–2001); Carolina Panthers (2002); Pittsburgh Steelers (2004)*; St. Louis Rams (2005)
- * Offseason or practice squad member only

Coaching
- Tennessee (2013–2014) Graduate assistant; Colorado State (2015–2017) Defensive backs coach; Tennessee (2018) Defensive backs coach

Awards and highlights
- PFWA All-Rookie Team (1998); 2× First-team All-SEC (1996, 1997)

Career NFL statistics
- Tackles: 220
- Sacks: 1
- Interceptions: 7
- Stats at Pro Football Reference

Terrance Delon Fair (born July 20, 1976) is an American former professional football player who was a cornerback in the National Football League (NFL). A first round pick in the 1998 NFL draft, he played from 1998 to 2005. He played college football for the Tennessee Volunteers.

After his NFL career, Fair spent three seasons on the coaching staff at Phoenix College, and co-hosted The Drive, a sports talk show in Knoxville. He joined the Tennessee coaching staff as a graduate assistant under Butch Jones in 2013. He worked as cornerbacks coach under Mike Bobo at Colorado State from 2015 to 2017.

== Early life ==
Fair played high school football at South Mountain High School in his native Phoenix, Arizona. He played primarily at running back and defensive back, but occasionally lined up at quarterback and wide receiver. During his senior season in 1993, he rushed for 1,475 yards and 28 touchdowns on 172 carries, and tallied over 3,000 yards during his career as a three-year starter. He was named to the high school All-American teams of Super Prep and Blue Chip. Along with football, Fair also played for the basketball team, and competed in the high jump in track and field.

== College career ==
Fair played college football at the University of Tennessee, part of the school's heralded 1994 signing class. During his freshman season in 1994, he tallied 41 tackles, an interception, and three passes broken up, and was named to the All-SEC Freshman team. The following season, he recorded 50 tackles, two interceptions, and four passes broken up. During his junior year in 1996, he recorded 33 tackles, four interceptions, and three passes broken up, and returned 29 punts for 400 yards and two touchdowns. During his senior season in 1997, Fair recorded 39 tackles, five interceptions, and nine passes broken up, and returned 19 punts for 272 yards, helping the Vols win the SEC Championship. He was named All-SEC in 1996 and 1997.

== Professional career ==
Fair was selected in the first round (20th overall pick) by the Detroit Lions in the 1998 NFL draft. During his rookie year with the Lions, he tallied 39 tackles, including one sack, and led the NFL in kick return average with 28 yards per return. He returned two kickoffs for a touchdown, including a season-long 105-yarder against Tampa Bay on Monday Night Football. For his game against Tampa Bay, he won NFC Special Teams Player of the Week. He was named to the NFL All-Rookie team by the Sporting News and Pro Football Writers Association.

During his second season in 1999, Fair recorded three interceptions, including a 41-yard pick six against Minnesota, and averaged 22.1 yards on 34 kick returns. He won NFC Special Teams Player of the Week for his game against the Vikings. In 2000, he intercepted two passes, returned six kickoffs for 149 yards, and returned two punts for 15 yards. In 2001, Fair registered 43 tackles and intercepted two passes, including a 26-yard pick six against Cleveland, though he struggled with a foot injury during the latter part of the season.

After being released by the Lions in 2002, Fair signed with the Carolina Panthers, but played only three games before a broken ankle ended his season He was subsequently released by the Panthers, and spent the 2003 season recovering in Phoenix. In 2004, he signed with the Pittsburgh Steelers, but was cut prior to the season. Fair signed with the St. Louis Rams in 2005, but played in only five games due to injuries.

== Coaching career ==
After retiring from the NFL, Fair joined the coaching staff at Phoenix College. Four of his players went on to join Division I programs. He also co-hosted The Drive, a sports talk radio show that aired on WNOX in Knoxville. In 2010, he obtained a degree in psychology from the University of Tennessee. In 2013, Fair joined Butch Jones's staff at Tennessee as a defensive quality control assistant. Fair served as the cornerbacks coach on the staff of Mike Bobo at Colorado State from 2015 to 2017.

In December 2017, Fair returned to his alma mater, the University of Tennessee, joining the staff of newly hired head coach Jeremy Pruitt. On February 8, 2019, Tennessee parted ways with Fair.

== Personal life ==
Fair and his wife, Sherlone, have three children together, Herandre, Delan, and Ariyah. His uncle Fred Carr played in the NFL for the Green Bay Packers.
