= Rufus French =

American football player (born 1978)

No. 9
- Position: Tight end

Personal information
- Born: March 15, 1978 (age 48)
- Listed height: 6 ft 2 in (1.88 m)
- Listed weight: 256 lb (116 kg)

Career information
- High school: Amory (Amory, Mississippi)
- College: Ole Miss
- NFL draft: 1999: undrafted

Career history
- Seattle Seahawks (1999–2000); Green Bay Packers (2002)*
- * Offseason or practice squad member only

Awards and highlights
- Unanimous All-American (1998); Third-team All-American (1997); 2× First-team All-SEC (1997, 1998)

Joel Rufus French (born March 15, 1978) is an American former college football player who was a tight end for the Ole Miss Rebels. He was a two-time All-American, earning unanimous honors in 1998. He was also a member of the Seattle Seahawks and Green Bay Packers of the National Football League (NFL), but never played in a regular season NFL game.

== Early life ==
Joel Rufus French played football and baseball at Amory High School in Amory, Mississippi. He was selected by the San Diego Padres in the 30th round of the 1996 MLB June Amateur Draft.

== College career ==
French chose to play football for the Ole Miss Rebels. He was a unanimous All-American in 1998. French was a first-team All-SEC selection in 1997 and 1998. He was a finalist for the Conerly Trophy in 1998. French finished his college career with 84 receptions, 814 receiving yards and four receiving touchdowns. He chose to forgo his senior season and enter the 1999 NFL draft.

== Professional career ==
Pre-draft measurables
| Height | Weight | Arm length | Hand span | 40-yard dash | 10-yard split | 20-yard split | 20-yard shuttle | Three-cone drill | Vertical jump | Broad jump | Bench press |
|---|---|---|---|---|---|---|---|---|---|---|---|
| 6 ft 3 1/4 in (1.91 m) | 256 lb (116 kg) | 34 in (0.86 m) | 8 1/4 in (0.21 m) | 4.84 s | 1.67 s | 2.78 s | 4.50 s | 7.78 s | 32.0 in (0.81 m) | 8 ft 10 in (2.69 m) | 20 reps |
All values from NFL Combine

French signed with the Seattle Seahawks after going undrafted in the 1999 NFL draft. He missed the 2000 season while recovering from a knee injury. He was released by the Seahawks on August 5, 2001. French never played in a regular season NFL game.

French was signed by the Green Bay Packers on March 26, 2002. He was released by the Packers on July 23, 2002.

== Legal issues ==
In April 2024, French was charged for his alleged involvement in an over $70 million fraud case. French, who managed several durable medical equipment companies, and his co-conspirators used illegally obtained doctors orders to bill Medicare for medically unnecessary medical equipment.

In May 2026, French was sentenced to 196 months in prison and ordered to pay over $110 million in restitution.
