= Fred Weary (defensive back) =

American football player (born 1974)

No. 42, 24, 32
- Position: Cornerback

Personal information
- Born: April 12, 1974 (age 52); Jacksonville, Florida, U.S.
- Listed height: 5 ft 10 in (1.78 m)
- Listed weight: 181 lb (82 kg)

Career information
- High school: Mandarin (Jacksonville)
- College: Florida
- NFL draft: 1998: 4th round, 97th overall pick

Career history
- New Orleans Saints (1998–2001); Atlanta Falcons (2002); San Francisco 49ers (2003)*; St. Louis Rams (2003); Baltimore Ravens (2004)
- * Offseason or practice squad member only

Awards and highlights
- Bowl Alliance national champion (1996); Consensus All-American (1997); 2× First-team All-SEC (1996, 1997)

Career NFL statistics
- Tackles: 223
- Interceptions: 7
- Forced fumbles: 2
- Interception yards: 154
- Stats at Pro Football Reference

Joseph Frederick Weary (born April 12, 1974) is an American former professional football player who was a cornerback for six seasons in the National Football League (NFL) during the 1990s and 2000s. Weary played college football for the Florida Gators football, was a member of a national championship team, and earned consensus All-American honors. Thereafter, he played professionally for the New Orleans Saints, Atlanta Falcons and St. Louis Rams of the NFL.

== Early life ==
Weary was born in Jacksonville, Florida. He attended Mandarin High School in Jacksonville, where he played for the Mandarin Mustangs high school football team.

== College career ==
Weary received an athletic scholarship to attend the University of Florida in Gainesville, Florida, and played for coach Steve Spurrier's Florida Gators football team from 1994 to 1997. As a junior, Weary was a starter on the Gators' 1996 team that defeated the Florida State Seminoles 52–20 in the 1997 Sugar Bowl to win the Bowl Alliance national championship. As a senior team captain and defensive back for the Gators, Weary had six interceptions, and fifteen in his college career—the most in school history. He was a first-team All-Southeastern Conference (SEC) selection in 1996 and 1997, and a consensus first-team All-American in 1997. He finished his four-year college career with fifteen interceptions and thirty-five blocked passes.

== Professional career ==
Weary was chosen in the fourth round (ninety-seventh pick overall) of the 1998 NFL draft by the New Orleans Saints. He played for the Saints from 1998 to 2001. During his second and third seasons with the Saints, Weary became a regular starter at right cornerback; his fourth year, however, he only started in a single game.

Weary finished his NFL career with the Atlanta Falcons in 2002 and the St. Louis Rams in 2003, seeing only limited playing time in a backup role. In his six NFL seasons, Weary appeared in eighty-three regular season games, and started twenty-five of them; he recorded 191 tackles, seven interceptions, and one interception return for a touchdown.

== NFL career statistics ==
Legend
**Bold**	Career high

Year	Team	Games		Tackles				Interceptions				Fumbles			
Year	Team	GP	GS	Comb	Solo	Ast	Sck	Int	Yds	TD	Lng	FF	FR	Yds	TD
1998	NOR	14	1	34	28	6	0.0	**2**	**64**	**1**	**63**	0	0	0	0
1999	NOR	16	11	**68**	**61**	**7**	0.0	**2**	49	0	27	0	**4**	**60**	**1**
2000	NOR	12	12	55	48	**7**	**2.0**	**2**	27	0	27	**2**	0	0	0
2001	NOR	14	1	20	18	2	0.0	0	0	0	0	0	0	0	0
2002	ATL	16	0	34	27	**7**	0.0	1	14	0	14	0	0	0	0
2003	STL	11	0	12	10	2	0.0	0	0	0	0	0	0	0	0
		83	25	223	192	31	2.0	7	154	1	63	2	4	60	1

== See also ==
- 1997 College Football All-America Team
- Florida Gators football, 1990–99
- List of Florida Gators football All-Americans
- List of Florida Gators in the NFL draft
- List of New Orleans Saints players
- List of St. Louis Rams players
- List of University of Florida alumni
