= Reidel Anthony =

American football player and coach (born 1976)

No. 85, 84
- Position: Wide receiver

Personal information
- Born: October 20, 1976 (age 50); Pahokee, Florida, U.S.
- Listed height: 5 ft 11 in (1.80 m)
- Listed weight: 178 lb (81 kg)

Career information
- High school: Glades Central (Belle Glade, Florida)
- College: Florida
- NFL draft: 1997: 1st round, 16th overall pick

Career history

Playing
- Tampa Bay Buccaneers (1997–2001); Washington Redskins (2002)*
- * Offseason or practice squad member only

Coaching
- Trinity Catholic High School (Asst.) (2010–present)

Awards and highlights
- PFWA All-Rookie Team (1997); Bowl Alliance National Championship (1996); Consensus All-American (1996); First-team All-SEC (1996); University of Florida Athletic Hall of Fame; Florida–Georgia Hall of Fame

Career NFL statistics
- Receptions: 144
- Receiving yards: 1,846
- Receiving touchdowns: 16
- Return yards: 2,244
- Stats at Pro Football Reference

Reidel Clarence Anthony (born October 20, 1976) is an American former professional football player who was a wide receiver in the National Football League (NFL) from 1997 to 2001. He played college football for the Florida Gators, and received consensus All-American honors in 1996. Anthony was a first-round pick in the 1997 NFL draft, and played professionally for the Tampa Bay Buccaneers of the NFL.

== Early life ==
Anthony was born in Pahokee, Florida, in 1976. He attended Glades Central High School in Belle Glade, Florida, and he was a stand-out high school football player for the Glades Central Raiders. He is the son of former South Bay, Florida mayor Clarence E. Anthony.

== College career ==
Anthony accepted an athletic scholarship to attend the University of Florida in Gainesville, Florida, where he was a wide receiver and a key target in head coach Steve Spurrier's Florida Gators football team from 1994 to 1996. Anthony showed his stuff as a freshman in Spurrier's "fun 'n' gun" offense in 1994, when he caught an 87-yard touchdown pass from Gators quarterback Eric Kresser against the Southern Mississippi Golden Eagles. As a junior in 1996, he played an instrumental role in the Gators' 12–1 national championship season, catching seventy-two passes to lead the Southeastern Conference (SEC) with 1,293 yards (an average of 18.0 yards per reception), and setting the SEC regular season record with eighteen touchdown catches. Both Anthony and his fellow Gator wideout, Ike Hilliard, were first-team All-SEC selections and earned consensus first-team All-American honors. During his three college seasons, the Gators won three consecutive SEC Championship Games in 1994, 1995, and 1996.

In the aftermath of his All-American junior season and the Gators' Bowl Alliance national championship victory over the Florida State Seminoles in the Sugar Bowl, Anthony decided to forgo his final season of NCAA eligibility and enter the NFL Draft. He finished his college career with 126 receptions for 2,274 yards and twenty-six touchdowns (a career average of 18.0 yards per reception). His eighteen receiving touchdowns in 1996 remains the Gators' team record and was the SEC record until it was surpassed by Ja'Marr Chase and DeVonta Smith in 2019 and 2020 respectively. The scores are tied for third with Justin Jefferson.

In a 2006 series written for The Gainesville Sun, Anthony was recognized as No. 17 among the 100 all-time greatest Gators of the first 100 years of Florida football. He was inducted into the University of Florida Athletic Hall of Fame as a "Gator Great" in 2009.

== Professional career ==
Pre-draft measurables
| Height | Weight | Arm length | Hand span |
|---|---|---|---|
| 5 ft 11 1/2 in (1.82 m) | 183 lb (83 kg) | 32 1/2 in (0.83 m) | 9 1/4 in (0.23 m) |

His home state Tampa Bay Buccaneers chose Anthony in the first round (sixteenth pick overall) of the 1997 NFL Draft. He played for the Buccaneers for five seasons from 1997 to 2001.

In 1997, Anthony recorded thirty-five receptions for 448 yards and four touchdowns. In his fourth game, Anthony became (and still remains) the second youngest NFL player ever to record a touchdown reception (20 years, 336 days). In 1998, he set career highs with fifty-one receptions for 708 yards and seven touchdowns. In perhaps his finest game as a Buccaneer, Anthony recorded 126 receiving yards with two touchdowns against the Jacksonville Jaguars on November 15, 1998. During the year, he also finished eighth in the NFL in all-purpose yards, totaling 1,869 yards. In 1999, Anthony had thirty receptions for 296 yards, and scored one touchdown. In 2000, Anthony had fifteen receptions for 232 yards and four touchdowns. In his final NFL season in 2001, he recorded thirteen receptions for 162 yards.

Anthony finished his five-year NFL career with 144 receptions for 1,846 yards and sixteen touchdowns.

=== NFL statistics ===
Receiving Stats

| Year | Team | Games | Receptions | Yards | Yards per Reception | Longest Reception | Touchdowns | First Downs | Fumbles | Fumbles Lost |
|---|---|---|---|---|---|---|---|---|---|---|
| 1997 | TB | 16 | 35 | 448 | 12.8 | 38 | 4 | 23 | 0 | 0 |
| 1998 | TB | 15 | 51 | 708 | 13.9 | 79 | 7 | 35 | 0 | 0 |
| 1999 | TB | 13 | 30 | 296 | 9.9 | 30 | 1 | 18 | 1 | 0 |
| 2000 | TB | 16 | 15 | 232 | 15.5 | 46 | 4 | 13 | 0 | 0 |
| 2001 | TB | 13 | 13 | 162 | 12.5 | 35 | 0 | 8 | 0 | 0 |
| Career | | 73 | 144 | 1,846 | 12.8 | 79 | 16 | 97 | 1 | 0 |

Kickoff Return Stats

| Year | Team | Games | Attempts | Yards | Touchdowns | Fair Catches | Longest Return |
|---|---|---|---|---|---|---|---|
| 1997 | TB | 16 | 25 | 592 | 0 | 0 | 51 |
| 1998 | TB | 15 | 46 | 1,118 | 0 | 0 | 60 |
| 1999 | TB | 13 | 21 | 434 | 0 | 0 | 39 |
| 2000 | TB | 16 | 3 | 88 | 0 | 0 | 45 |
| 2001 | TB | 13 | 0 | 0 | 0 | 0 | 0 |
| Career | | 73 | 95 | 2,232 | 0 | 0 | 60 |

== Life after the NFL ==
Anthony currently is the offensive coordinator at his alma mater, Glades Central High School in Belle Glade, Florida. He was formerly the receivers coach for the Celtics football team of Trinity Catholic High School in Ocala, Florida. He is also a contributing writer to the ESPN-affiliated fan site GatorCountry.com as its official offensive analyst.

== See also ==
- 1996 College Football All-America Team
- Florida Gators football, 1990–99
- History of the Tampa Bay Buccaneers
- List of Florida Gators football All-Americans
- List of Florida Gators in the NFL draft
- List of NCAA major college football yearly receiving leaders
- List of Tampa Bay Buccaneers first-round draft picks
- List of University of Florida Athletic Hall of Fame members
