= Shea Showers =

American football player (born 1974)

Profile
- Position: Defensive back

Personal information
- Born: January 11, 1974 (age 52)
- Listed height: 5 ft 11 in (1.80 m)
- Listed weight: 184 lb (83 kg)

Career information
- High school: Santa Fe (Alachua, Florida)
- College: Florida
- NFL draft: 1997: undrafted

Career history
- Iowa Barnstormers (1998–2000); Tampa Bay Storm (2001); New York Dragons (2001–2002); Grand Rapids Rampage (2003); Tampa Bay Storm (2004)

Awards and highlights
- Second-team All-Arena (1999); AFL All-Rookie Team (1998); National champion (1996)

Career AFL statistics
- Tackles: 423
- Interceptions: 22
- Pass breakups: 83
- Force fumbles: 3
- Fumble recoveries: 4
- Stats at ArenaFan.com

Jermaine "Shea" Showers (born January 11, 1974) is an American former professional football defensive back who played seven seasons in the Arena Football League (AFL) with the Iowa Barnstormers, New York Dragons, Grand Rapids Rampage and Tampa Bay Storm. He played college football at the University of Florida.

== Early life ==
Showers played high school football at Santa Fe High School in Alachua, Florida. He recorded 40 receptions for 711 yards and 11 touchdowns his senior year as the Raiders won the Class 3A state title. He also accumulated 90 tackles and five interceptions.

== College career ==
Showers was a member of the Florida Gators from 1992 to 1996.

== Professional career ==
Showers played for the Iowa Barnstormers from 1998 to 2000, earning second-team All-Arena honors in 1999 and being named to the AFL's All-Rookie Team in 1998. He signed with the Tampa Bay Storm on January 8, 2001. He played for the New York Dragons from 2001 to 2002. Showers was signed by the Grand Rapids Rampage December 10, 2002. He signed with the Tampa Bay Storm on December 16, 2003.

== Coaching career ==
Showers was defensive backs coach at Fort White High School in Fort White, Florida in 2007. He served as head football coach at the Santa Fe High School in Alachua, Florida from 2008 to 2010. He became an assistant coach for the Fort White High School in Fort White, Florida in 2011.
