= 1998 All-SEC football team =

American college football all-star team

The 1998 All-SEC football team consists of American football players selected to the All-Southeastern Conference (SEC) chosen by the Associated Press (AP) and the conference coaches for the 1998 NCAA Division I-A football season.

The Tennessee Volunteers won the conference, beating the Mississippi State Bulldogs 24 to 14 in the SEC Championship game. The Volunteers then won the National Championship game over the Florida State Seminoles 23 to 16.

Kentucky quarterback Tim Couch was voted the AP SEC Offensive Player of the Year. Florida linebacker Jevon Kearse was voted AP SEC Defensive Player of the Year.

== Offensive selections ==
=== Quarterbacks ===
- Tim Couch†, Kentucky (AP-1, Coaches-1)
- Clint Stoerner, Arkansas (AP-2)

=== Running backs ===
- Kevin Faulk, LSU (AP-1, Coaches-1)
- J. J. Johnson, Miss. St. (AP-1)
- Shaun Alexander, Alabama (AP-2)
- Deuce McAllister, Ole Miss (AP-2)

=== Wide receivers ===
- Travis McGriff, Florida (AP-1)
- Craig Yeast, Kentucky (AP-1)
- Anthony Lucas, Arkansas (AP-2)
- Peerless Price, Tennessee (AP-2)

=== Centers ===
- Todd McClure, LSU (AP-1, Coaches-1)
- Eric Allen, Miss. St. (AP-2)

=== Guards ===
- Brandon Burlsworth, Arkansas (AP-1)
- Cosey Coleman, Tennessee (AP-1)
- Randy Thomas, Miss. St. (AP-2)

=== Tackles ===
- Matt Stinchcomb, Georgia (AP-1, Coaches-1)
- Kris Comstock, Kentucky (AP-1)
- Zach Piller, Florida (AP-2)
- Chad Clifton, Tennessee (AP-2)

=== Tight ends ===
- Rufus French, Ole Miss (AP-1, Coaches-1)
- Reggie Kelly, Mississippi State (AP-1)
- Larry Brown, Georgia (AP-2)

== Defensive selections ==
=== Defensive ends ===
- Edward Smith, Miss. St. (AP-1)
- Leonardo Carson, Auburn (AP-1)
- Kenny Smith, Alabama (AP-2)
- Willie Cohens, Florida (AP-2)
- Antonio Cochran, Georgia (AP-2)
- C. J. McLain, Arkansas (AP-2)

=== Defensive tackles ===
- Booger McFarland, LSU (AP-1)
- Reggie McGrew, Florida (AP-1)
- Darwin Walker, Tennessee (AP-1)
- Melvin Bradley, Arkansas (AP-2)
- Charles Dorsey, Auburn (AP-2)
- Ed Chester, Florida (AP-2)

=== Linebackers ===
- Al Wilson†, Tennessee (AP-1, Coaches-1)
- Jevon Kearse, Florida (AP-1, Coaches-1)
- Raynoch Thompson, Tennessee (AP-1)
- Mike Peterson, Florida (AP-2)
- Johnny Rutledge, Florida (AP-2)
- Jamie Winborn, Vanderbilt (AP-2)
- Armegis Spearman, Ole Miss (AP-2)

=== Cornerbacks ===
- Champ Bailey*, Georgia (AP-1, Coaches-1)
- Tony George, Florida (AP-1)
- Fernando Bryant, Alabama (AP-1)
- Jimmy Williams, Vanderbilt (AP-2)
- Dwayne Goodrich, Tennessee (AP-2)

=== Safeties ===
- Zac Painter, Arkansas (AP-1)
- Kirby Smart, Georgia (AP-1)
- Teako Brown, Florida (AP-2)
- Kenoy Kennedy, Arkansas (AP-2)
- Rob Pate, Auburn (Coaches-2)

== Special teams ==
=== Kickers ===
- Jeff Hall, Tennessee (AP-1)
- Todd Latourette, Arkansas (AP-2)

=== Punters ===
- Daniel Pope, Alabama (AP-1)
- Jeff Walker, Miss. St. (AP-2)

=== All purpose/return specialist ===
- Craig Yeast, Kentucky (AP-1)
- Kevin Prentiss, Miss. St. (AP-2)

== Key ==
*Bold: Consensus first-team selection by both the coaches and AP
AP: Associated Press
Coaches: selected by the SEC coaches
*Unanimous selection of AP
†Unanimous selection of both AP and Coaches

== See also ==
- 1998 College Football All-America Team
