= Santa Fe High School (Florida) =

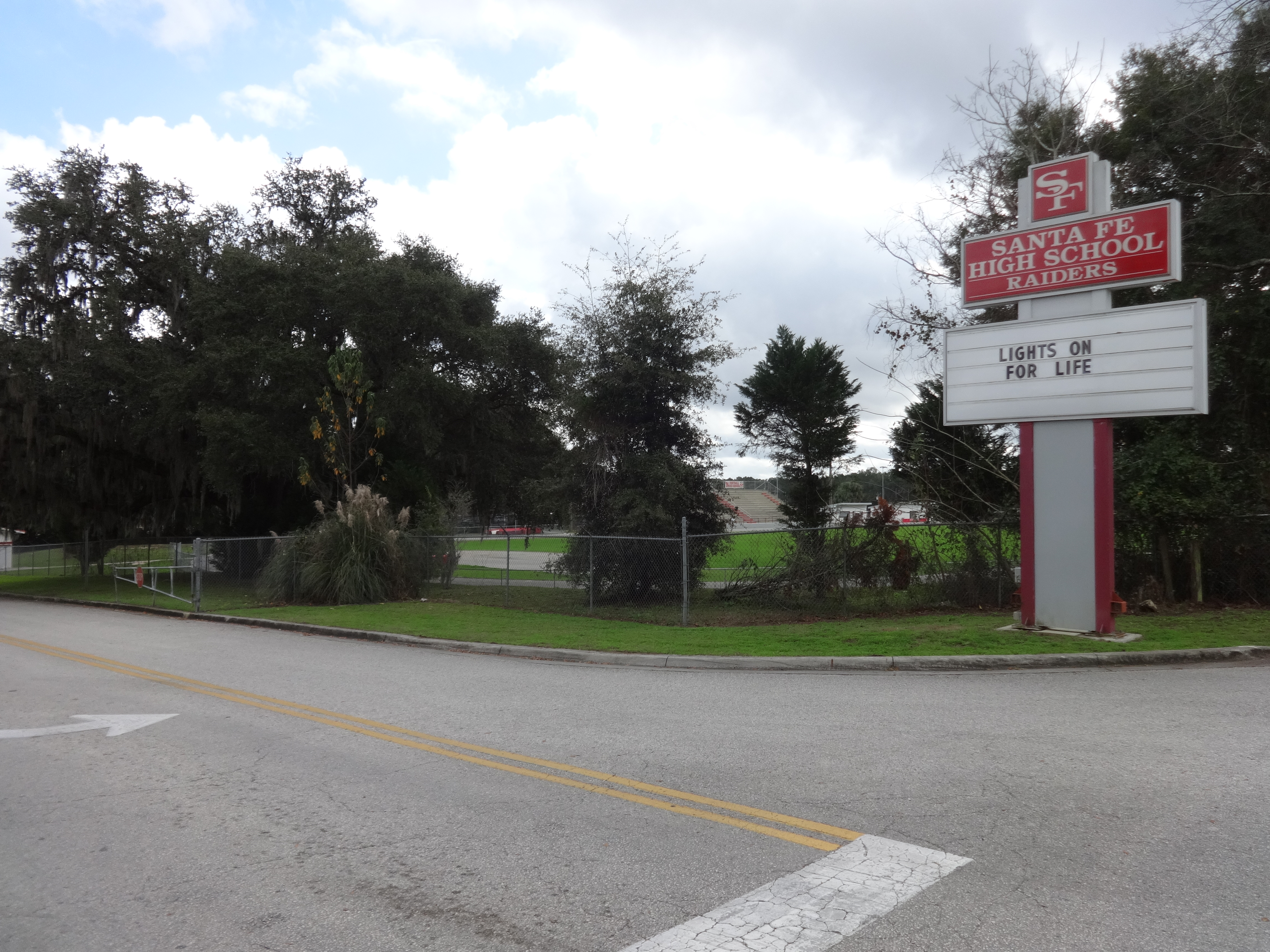

Location
- 16213 Northwest US Highway 441; Alachua, Florida 32615; United States
- Coordinates: 29°48′26″N 82°31′28″W

Information
- School district: Alachua County Public Schools
- Principal: Kelly Armstrong
- Teaching staff: 43.80 (FTE)
- Grades: 9–12
- Enrollment: 1,151 (2023-2024)
- Student to teacher ratio: 26.28
- Colors: Red and Gray
- Nickname: Raiders, SFHS
- Website: www.alachuaschools.net/o/santa-fe

Santa Fe High School is a high school serving grades 9–12 from the Alachua-High Springs area in the northwestern part of Alachua County, Florida. It is located in Alachua, Florida and a part of the Alachua County Public Schools.

== History ==
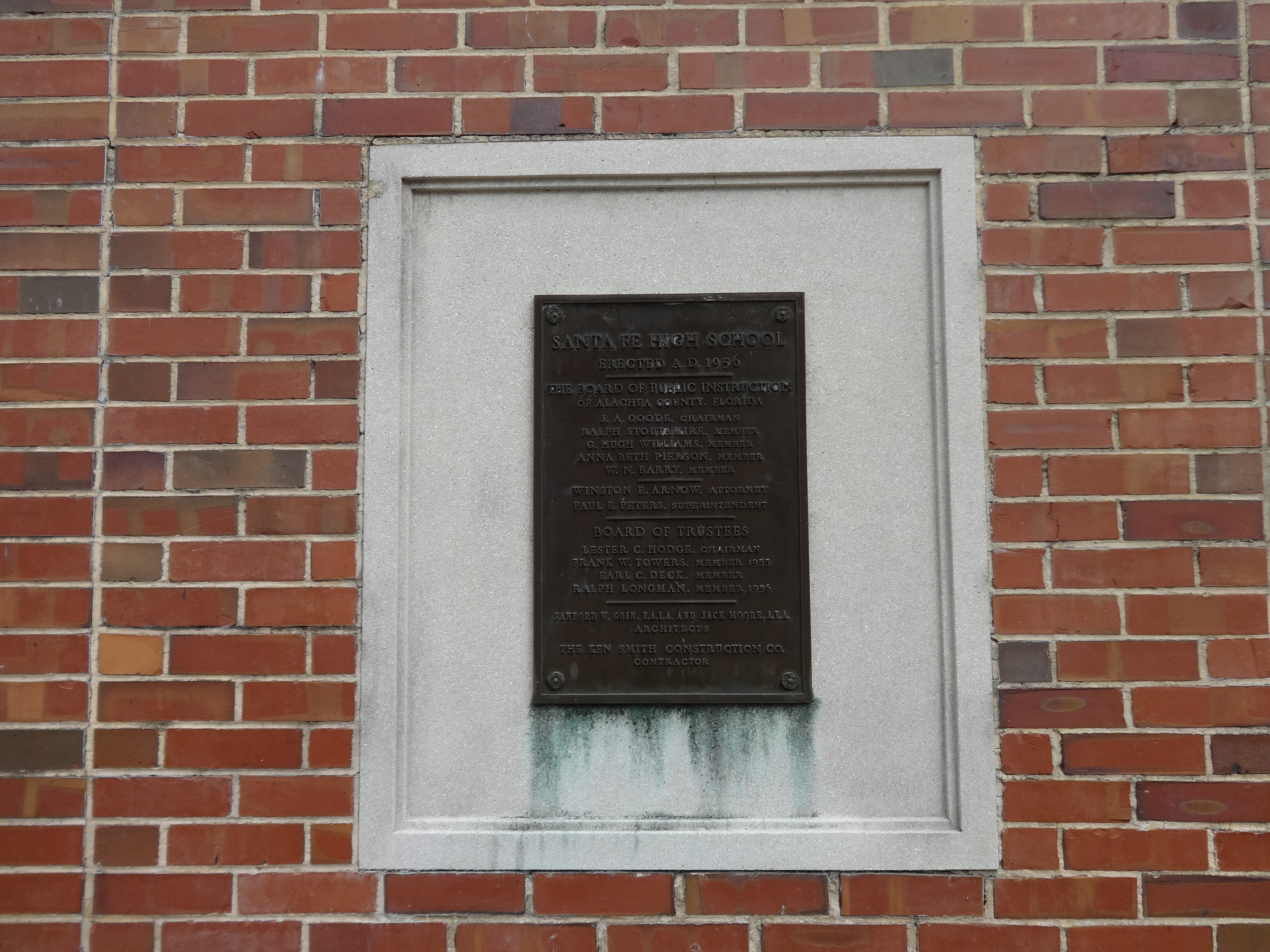
Plaque

The consolidated Santa Fe High School was conceived in 1954 to replace schools in High Springs, Newberry and Alachua. The school opened in 1956. The school mascot was originally the Rebels, but was later changed to the Raiders in 1970 when the school was integrated by federal court order. The school colors are red and gray.

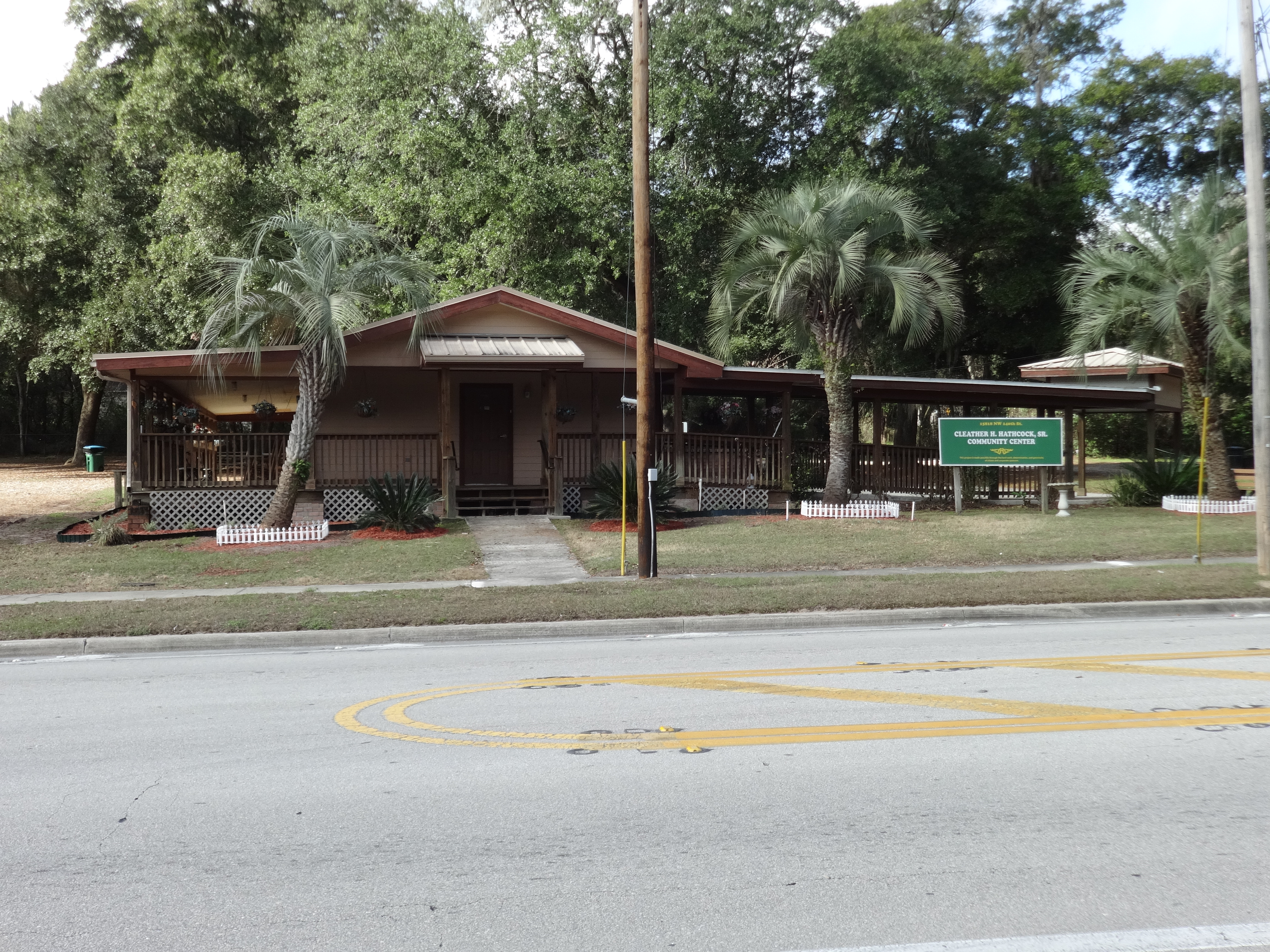
Cleather H. Hathcock Sr. Community Center

Cleathet Hathcock Sr. was a teacher and principal at the school who also served on the city council and as mayor. A community center is named for him.

== Academics ==
Santa Fe has ranked within the top 5 public high schools out of 18 in Alachua County, the top 40% of public high schools in the State of Florida, and the top 30% of public high schools in the nation according to U.S. News & World Report.

Santa Fe has three magnet programs: the Institute of Biotechnology, which combines with the Biomedical Mustangs magnet program at A.L. Mebane Middle School to offer a track for students to become licensed and experienced to either continue their education at the Santa Fe College Perry Center for Emerging Technologies (also in Alachua), or enter the workforce in one of the several emerging technology companies located within the City; the Academy of AgriScience; and the Academy of Veterinary Assisting.

== Athletics ==
The football team has won two state championships, 1991 and 1994 and was State Runner-Up in 1969.

Boys basketball was State Runner-Up in 2021.

The baseball team won the 1975 State Championship and was Runner-Up in 1972. The 1968 team became the first athletic team in school history to advance to a Final Four. The squad dropped a Semifinal affair to Monsignor Pace 5-0 in 10 innings. In 1971 Ray Gallop became the first athlete to be selected in the MLB draft going in a late round to the Los Angeles Dodgers. Years later LHP Lenny DiNardo was selected by the Boston Redsox and became the first Raider baseball player to advance to the Big Leagues where he collected a World Series Ring as a member of the 2004 Redsox. Santa Fe left-handed pitcher Kirby Snead was taken by the Toronto Blue Jays in the MLB Draft of 2016. Snead, like DiNardo enjoyed a long career in the Majors with multiple teams.

The girls volleyball team won the 2021 and 2022 FHSAA 4A State Championship and was State Runner-Up in 2018 and 2019.

Girls Track and Field was State Runner-Up in 2001, and Boys Track and Field was State Runner-up in 1985.

Boys Weightlifting were State Champions in 1987 and 1990 and State Runner-Up in 1981, 1982, 1985, and 1991.

The boys soccer team has won a total of three district championships in 2012, 2013, and 2019.

Girls softball is a perennial powerhouse with numerous District Championships anchored by the 2005 team that reach as high as number 8 Nationally. The 2005 squad reeled off a school record 29 consecutive wins before dropping a heart breaker to Navarre in the Regional Semifinals.

== Marching Band ==
The "Raider Regiment" marching band has won eight state championships, five consecutively from 1999 to 2003, then again in 2005, 2009 and 2010.

== Notable alumni ==
- Gina Crews, graduated in 1991; starred in Survivor Marquesas 2002
- Craig Fugate (born 1959) - Former administrator of the Federal Emergency Management Agency

=== Baseball ===
- Lenny DiNardo (born 1979) - Former professional baseball pitcher. Played in the MLB from 2004 to 2009.
- Kirby Snead (born 1994) - Professional baseball pitcher in the Seattle Mariners organization

=== Football ===
- Dwayne Dixon (born 1962) - Former college and professional wide receiver, played college football for University of Florida
- Tracy Ham (born 1964) - Former professional quarterback who played in the Canadian Football League, Senior Associate Athletics Director Georgia Southern University
- Linval Joseph (born 1988) - Professional defensive tackle for the Dallas Cowboys, played college football at East Carolina University
- Adrian N. Peterson (born 1979) - Former professional running back, played college football for Georgia Southern University
- Mike Peterson (born 1976) - Assistant coach for University of Florida, played college football for the Florida Gators
- Shea Showers (born 1974) - Former defensive back who played seven seasons in the Arena Football League. played college football at the University of Florida
- Freddie Solomon (born 1972) - Former professional wide receiver who played in the NFL
