= Larry Brown (tight end, born 1976) =

American football player (born 1976)

No. 87
- Position: Tight end

Personal information
- Born: September 1, 1976 (age 50); Decatur, Georgia, U.S.
- Listed height: 6 ft 4 in (1.93 m)
- Listed weight: 280 lb (127 kg)

Career information
- High school: Alonzo A. Crim
- College: Georgia
- NFL draft: 1999: undrafted

Career history
- San Diego Chargers (1999)*; Tennessee Titans (1999–2000)
- * Offseason or practice squad member only

Awards and highlights
- 2× Second-team All-SEC (1997, 1998)
- Stats at Pro Football Reference

Larry Lovette Brown (born September 1, 1976) is an American former professional football player who was a tight end for the Tennessee Titans of the National Football League (NFL). He played college football for the Georgia Bulldogs.
