= Adrian Peterson (American football, born 1979) =

American football player and coach (born 1979)

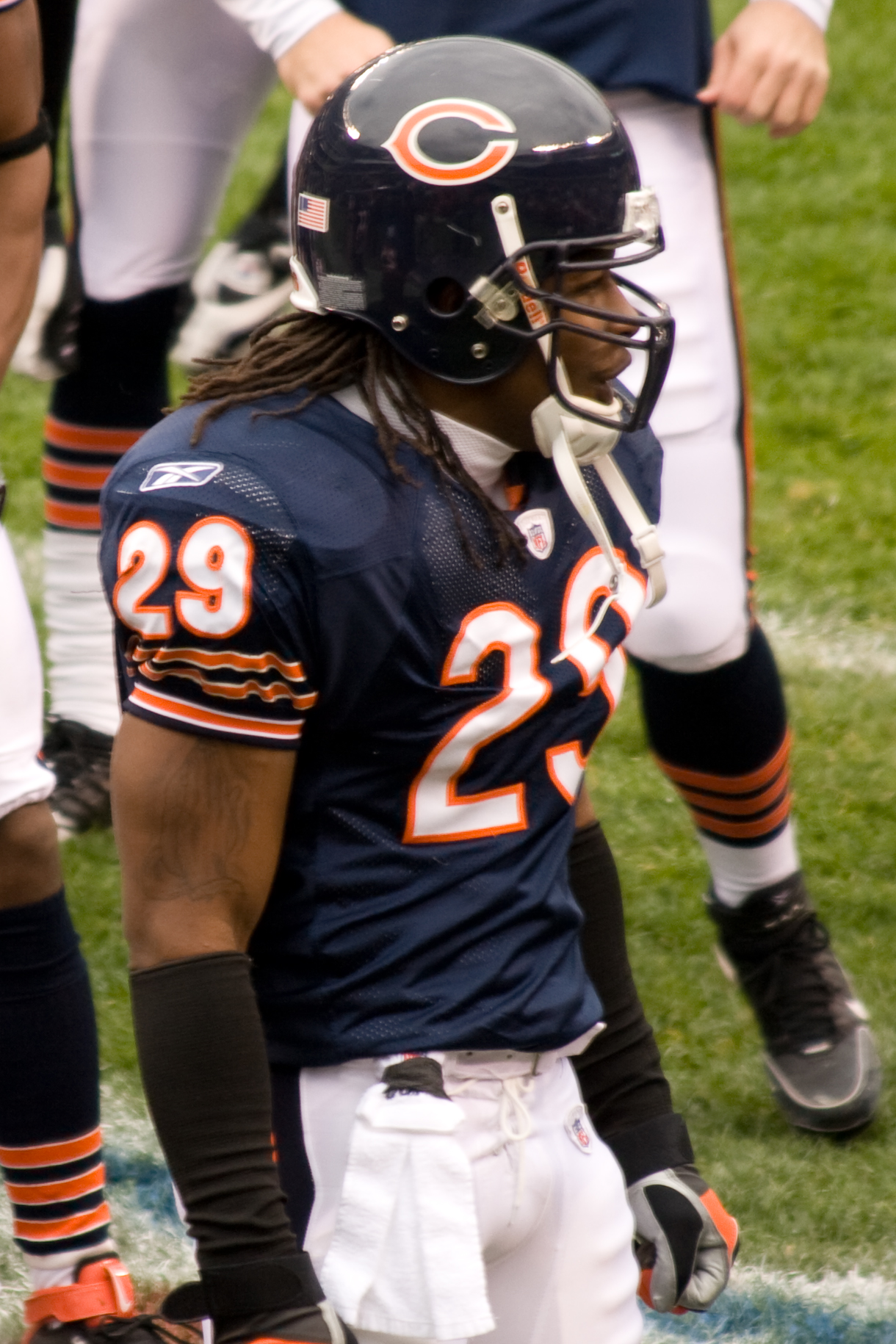
- Peterson with the Chicago Bears in 2008

Georgia Southern Eagles
- Title: Director of student-athlete development

Personal information
- Born: July 1, 1979 (age 47); Gainesville, Florida, U.S.
- Listed height: 5 ft 10 in (1.78 m)
- Listed weight: 212 lb (96 kg)

Career information
- Position: Running back (No. 29)
- High school: Santa Fe (Alachua, Florida)
- College: Georgia Southern (1998–2001)
- NFL draft: 2002: 6th round, 199th overall pick

Career history

Playing
- Chicago Bears (2002–2009); Seattle Seahawks (2010)*; Virginia Destroyers (2011–2012)
- * Offseason or practice squad member only

Coaching
- Georgia Southern (2018–present) Director of student-athlete development

Awards and highlights
- 2× NCAA Division I-AA national champion (1999, 2000); Walter Payton Award (1999); UFL champion (2011); Georgia Southern Eagles No. 3 retired; Several FCS records

Career NFL statistics
- Rushing yards: 1,283
- Rushing average: 4.1
- Receptions: 78
- Receiving yards: 665
- Total touchdowns: 8
- Stats at Pro Football Reference
- College Football Hall of Fame

Adrian Nicholas Peterson (born July 1, 1979) is an American former professional football player who was a running back in the National Football League (NFL) and United Football League (UFL). He was selected by the Chicago Bears in the sixth round of the 2002 NFL draft, playing eight seasons for Chicago. Then he played for the Virginia Destroyers in the UFL. He played college football for the Georgia Southern Eagles, where he set numerous school, Southern Conference, and NCAA Division I-AA records, as well as winning two I-AA National Championships and receiving the Walter Payton Award for most outstanding player in I-AA football. He is currently serving as the director of student-athlete development for Georgia Southern.

== Early life ==
Peterson was born to Porter R. and Reatha M. Peterson; his father works at a plant that makes Energizer batteries. Adrian Peterson was a two-time all-state, all-area selection and team MVP at Santa Fe High School in Alachua, Florida where he rushed for 4,949 yards during his prep career to earn All-America honors from ESPN and Blue Chip Illustrated. Peterson ran for 1,526 yards and 17 TDs on 185 carries (8.2 avg.) to earn Florida Class 4A Player-of-the-Year honors as a senior. He also lettered four times in track and two times each in weightlifting and basketball while in high school.

== College career ==
Peterson played for Georgia Southern from 1998 to 2001. He finished his career, not including the playoffs, with 6,559 rushing yards, a Division I football record, and won the Walter Payton Award in 1999. He was the first sophomore to win the award for most outstanding player in I-AA football history. Peterson finished among the top three vote-getters for the Walter Payton Award in all four of his college football seasons. In 57 career games including the playoffs, he carried 1,378 times for 9,145 yards (6.6 avg), 111 touchdowns and an average of 160 yards per game. On September 29, 2012, Peterson was inducted into the Georgia Southern hall of fame in a ceremony held during halftime at Paulson Stadium. In January 2014, College Sporting News announced that the FCS Offensive Player of the Year Award will be named after Peterson. Peterson was inducted into the College Football Hall of Fame in 2017.

=== College statistics ===
			Rushing				Receiving		
Year	Team	GP	Att	Yards	Avg	TDs	Rec	Yards	TDs
1998	Georgia Southern	11	257	1,932	7.5	25	5	33	1
1999	Georgia Southern	11	248	1,807	7.2	28	9	163	1
2000	Georgia Southern	13	338	2,056	6.0	19	0	0	0
2001	Georgia Southern	14	322	1,795	5.5	21	5	4	0
Totals		49	1,165	7,590	6.5	93	19	200	2

== Professional career ==
Pre-draft measurables
Height	Weight	Arm length	Hand span	40-yard dash	10-yard split	20-yard split	20-yard shuttle	Three-cone drill	Vertical jump	Broad jump	Bench press
5 ft 10 in (1.78 m)	219 lb (99 kg)	31 3/4 in (0.81 m)	9 3/4 in (0.25 m)	4.55 s	1.68 s	2.73 s	4.60 s	7.59 s	34.0 in (0.86 m)	9 ft 11 in (3.02 m)	14 reps
All values from NFL Combine

=== Chicago Bears ===
The Chicago Bears selected Peterson in the sixth round of the 2002 NFL draft. During his first season as a Bear, he rushed for 101 yards on nineteen attempts, and scored a single touchdown. He missed most of the next season after sustaining an ankle injury. The team has primarily relied on Peterson as a specialist. In 2004, he led the Bears' special teams unit with 28 tackles.

Peterson saw more action as a running back during the 2005 Chicago Bears season, after the Bears' top two running backs, Thomas Jones and Cedric Benson, suffered injuries. On November 13, in the first game that both were injured, a game against the San Francisco 49ers, Peterson eclipsed the 100 yard mark in a game for the first time in his career. He rushed for 120 yards on 24 attempts and scored a touchdown. On the season, Peterson rushed for 391 yards on 76 attempts, and scored two touchdowns. Peterson was the team's second leading rusher during the season, and even went on to score a touchdown during the NFC Divisional game against the Carolina Panthers.

During the 2006 Chicago Bears season, Peterson returned to his role as a specialist and third string running back. He received occasional playtime as running back, but played a versatile role on the Bears' special teams. During the team's season finale, Peterson caught a 37-yard pass from Brad Maynard on a fake punt. In the NFC Championship game, Peterson tackled Michael Lewis and forced a fumble.

After the Bears traded Jones prior to the 2007 season, Peterson was promoted to second string running back. However, first string running back Cedric Benson sustained a season-ending injury on November 25, against the Denver Broncos. During the same game, Peterson scored his second rushing touchdown of the season, when he powered into the endzone despite being enveloped by several Bronco defenders. With this news, Peterson moved to first string, with rookie Garrett Wolfe moved to second string. Peterson had his second 100-yard rushing game on December 23, 2007, against the Green Bay Packers. Peterson had another productive performance the next week, during the Bears' season finale against the New Orleans Saints. He rushed for 91 yards, and even threw a 9-yard touchdown pass to Bernard Berrian.

When the Bears drafted Matt Forte and brought in Kevin Jones, Peterson saw little to no action at running back. He was cut from the team after the Bears signed Chester Taylor before the 2010 season.

=== Seattle Seahawks ===
Peterson signed with the Seattle Seahawks on August 12, 2010, but was released by the team just five days later.

=== Virginia Destroyers ===
Peterson was drafted by the Virginia Destroyers in the third round (14th overall) of the 2011 UFL draft. He signed with the team on June 15. He played in three games for the Destroyers in 2011, rushing 33 times for 160 yards and one touchdown while also catching 6 passes for 53 yards. The Destroyers finished the regular season with a 3–1 record and won the 2011 UFL championship game.

Peterson appeared in all four games for the Destroyers during the 2012 season, recording four carries for 15 yards and 13 receptions for 100 yards. Virginia finished the year 1–3.

== Coaching career ==
On February 13, 2018, Peterson returned to Georgia Southern as director of student-athlete development for the football team under Chad Lunsford. He took over for Andrew Dodge, who moved to an on-field coaching assignment toward the end of the 2016 season.

== Personal life ==
Peterson is the younger brother of former Atlanta Falcons linebacker Mike Peterson. He is also related to Freddie Solomon, who played for the Miami Dolphins and San Francisco 49ers. He performs community work and hosts an annual free youth football camp. Additionally, Peterson, who has a speech impediment, volunteers to help children who also face the same challenge.

Peterson released his autobiography Don't Dis My Abilities in 2013.

On February 17, 2015, Peterson's 7-year-old son died of brain cancer.
