= Mike Moten =

American football player (born 1974)

No. 74, 98
- Position: Defensive tackle

Personal information
- Born: March 12, 1974 (age 52); Daytona Beach, Florida, U.S.
- Listed height: 6 ft 5 in (1.96 m)
- Listed weight: 266 lb (121 kg)

Career information
- High school: Mainland (Daytona Beach, Florida)
- College: Florida (1993–1997)
- NFL draft: 1998: undrafted

Career history
- Arizona Cardinals (1998–2000); Orlando Rage (2001)*; Arizona Rattlers (2002)*; Ottawa Renegades (2002–2004)
- * Offseason or practice squad member only

Awards and highlights
- National champion (1996); First-team All-SEC (1997)

Career NFL statistics
- Games played: 3
- Tackles: 1
- Stats at Pro Football Reference

Career CFL statistics
- Games played: 24
- Tackles: 37
- Sacks: 2
- Pass deflections: 4
- Fumble recoveries: 2
- Stats at CFL.ca
- Stats at ArenaFan.com

Michael Edward Moten (born March 12, 1974) is an American former professional football defensive tackle who played for the Arizona Cardinals of the National Football League (NFL). He played college football for the Florida Gators.

== Early life ==
Moten was born on July 22, 1974, in Daytona Beach, Florida. He attended Mainland High School in Daytona Beach. As a senior, Moten had 124 tackles, including ten for a loss and 12 sacks and committed to play college football at the University of Florida.

== College career ==
Moten played college football for the Florida Gators from 1993 to 1997 and was a three-year letterman from 1995 to 1997. As a senior, he had 31 tackles, 4.5sacks, five pass deflections and a fumble returned for a touchdown, earning first-team All-SEC honors.

== Professional career ==
=== Arizona Cardinals ===
After going undrafted in the 1998 NFL draft, Moten signed with the Arizona Cardinals as an undrafted free agent. On September 6, he was waived by the team. On October 27, Moten was signed to the practice squad. On December 11, he was elevated to the active roster. Moten was active for the last three games of the season, including the playoffs, where he had one tackle against the San Diego Chargers.

On August 30, 1999, Moten was placed on the injured reserve with a sprained knee. On August 24, 2000, he was released by the team.

=== Orlando Rage ===
Moten was selected by the Orlando Rage in the 2001 XFL draft. He was released prior to playing a game.

=== Arizona Rattlers ===
On March 19, 2002, Moten was signed by the Arizona Rattlers of the Arena Football League (AFL). He was waived on April 15. On April 20, Moten was signed to the practice squad. He was waived again on May 13.

=== Ottawa Renegades ===
On May 17, 2002, Moten was signed by the Ottawa Renegades of the Canadian Football League (CFL). He had 29 tackles, two sacks, three pass deflections and two fumble recoveries in 16 games. On June 14, 2003, Moten was placed on the injury list with a knee injury. On July 17, he returned to the active roster. Moten was released and re-signed to the team multiple times but ended up playing in eight games, recording eight tackles and one pass knockdown. On June 5, 2004, he announced his retirement from professional football due to lingering pain in his right knee.
