= 1997 All-SEC football team =

American college football all-star team

The 1997 All-SEC football team consists of American football players selected to the All-Southeastern Conference (SEC) chosen by the Associated Press (AP) and the conference coaches for the 1997 NCAA Division I-A football season.

The Tennessee Volunteers won the conference, beating the Auburn Tigers 30 to 29 in the SEC Championship game.

Tennessee quarterback Peyton Manning, the runner-up for the Heisman Trophy, was voted the AP SEC Offensive Player of the Year. Vanderbilt and Tennessee linebackers Jamie Duncan and Leonard Little tied for AP SEC Defensive Player of the Year.

== Offensive selections ==
=== Quarterbacks ===
- Peyton Manning, Tennessee (AP-1, Coaches-1)
- Tim Couch, Kentucky (AP-2)
- Dameyune Craig, Auburn (Coaches-2)

=== Running backs ===
- Fred Taylor, Florida (AP-1, Coaches-1)
- Kevin Faulk, LSU (AP-1, Coaches-1)
- John Avery, Ole Miss (AP-2, Coaches-2)
- Jamal Lewis, Tennessee (AP-2, Coaches-2)
- Robert Edwards, Georgia (Coaches-2)

=== Wide receivers ===
- Jacquez Green, Florida (AP-1, Coaches-1)
- Marcus Nash, Tennessee (AP-1, Coaches-2)
- Hines Ward, Georgia (AP-2, Coaches-1)
- Craig Yeast, Kentucky (AP-2, Coaches-2)

=== Centers ===
- Trey Teague, Tennessee (AP-2, Coaches-1)
- Todd McClure, LSU (AP-1)
- Eric Allen, Miss. St. (AP-2)

=== Guards ===
- Alan Faneca#, LSU (AP-1, Coaches-1)
- John Schlarman, Kentucky (AP-1, Coaches-2)
- Brandon Burlsworth, Arkansas (AP-2, Coaches-2)
- Will Friend, Alabama (AP-2)
- Devon Coburn, Ole Miss (Coaches-2)
- Jeno James, Auburn (Coaches-2)

=== Tackles ===
- Matt Stinchcomb#, Georgia (AP-1, Coaches-1)
- Victor Riley, Auburn (AP-1, Coaches-1)
- Robert Hicks, Miss. St. (AP-2, Coaches-1)
- Jamar Nesbit, South Carolina (AP-2)
- Boyd Kitchen, Ole Miss (AP-2)
- Chris Samuels, Alabama (Coaches-2)

=== Tight ends ===
- Rufus French, Ole Miss (AP-1, Coaches-1)
- Larry Brown, Georgia (AP-2)
- Rod Rutledge, Alabama (Coaches-2)

== Defensive selections ==
=== Ends ===
- Greg Favors, Miss. St. (AP-1, Coaches-1)
- Jimmy Brumbaugh, Auburn (AP-1, Coaches-2)
- Jonathan Brown, Tennessee (AP-1, Coaches-2)
- Chris Hood, Alabama (AP-2)
- Tim Beauchamp, Florida (AP-2)

=== Tackles ===
- Chuck Wiley, LSU (AP-1, Coaches-1)
- Mike Moten, Florida (AP-1, Coaches-1)
- Melvin Bradley, Arkansas (AP-2, Coaches-2)
- Henry Taylor, South Carolina (AP-2)
- Ed Chester, Florida (AP-2)

=== Linebackers ===
- Takeo Spikes, Auburn (AP-1, Coaches-1)
- Jamie Duncan, Vanderbilt (AP-1, Coaches-1)
- Leonard Little, Tennessee (AP-1, Coaches-2)
- Jevon Kearse, Florida (AP-2, Coaches-1)
- Al Wilson, Tennessee (AP-2, Coaches-1)
- Carlton Hall, Vanderbilt (AP-2, Coaches-2)
- Greg Bright, Georgia (AP-2, Coaches-2)
- Johnny Rutledge, Florida (AP-2)
- Broc Kreitz, Ole Miss (Coaches-2)

=== Cornerbacks ===
- Fred Weary#, Florida (AP-1, Coaches-1)
- Corey Chavous, Vanderbilt (AP-1, Coaches-1)
- Champ Bailey, Georgia (AP-2, Coaches-1)
- Cedric Donaldson, LSU (AP-2, Coaches-1)
- Terry Fair, Tennessee (AP-2, Coaches-1)
- Fernando Bryant, Alabama (Coaches-2)
- Deshea Townsend, Alabama (Coaches-2)

=== Safeties ===
- Teako Brown, Florida (AP-1, Coaches-2)
- Arturo Freeman, South Carolina (AP-1)
- Tremayne Martin, Kentucky (AP-2, Coaches-2)
- Eric Brown, Miss. St. (AP-2)
- Kirby Smart, Georgia (AP-2)
- Brad Ware, Auburn (Coaches-2)

== Special teams ==
=== Kickers ===
- Jaret Holmes, Auburn (AP-1, Coaches-1)
- Brian Hazelwood, Miss. St. (AP-2, Coaches-2)

=== Punters ===
- Chad Kessler, LSU (AP-1, Coaches-1)
- Jeff Walker, Miss. St. (AP-2, Coaches-2)

== Key ==
Bold = Consensus first-team selection by both the coaches and AP

AP = Associated Press

Coaches = Selected by the SEC coaches

# = unanimous selection by the coaches

== See also ==
- 1997 College Football All-America Team
