= 1996 Florida Gators football team =

91st football season in school history; first national championship victory

1996 Florida Gators football

Consensus national champion SEC champion SEC Eastern Division champion Sugar Bowl champion

SEC Championship Game, W 45–30 vs. Alabama

Sugar Bowl (BA NCG), W 52–20 vs. Florida State
- Conference: Southeastern Conference
- Eastern Division

Ranking
- Coaches: No. 1
- AP: No. 1
- Record: 12–1 (8–0 SEC)
- Head coach: Steve Spurrier (7th season)
- Offensive coordinator: Carl Franks (2nd season)
- Offensive scheme: Fun and gun
- Defensive coordinator: Bob Stoops (1st season)
- Base defense: 4–3
- Home stadium: Ben Hill Griffin Stadium

1996 Southeastern Conference football standings
	Conf.			Overall
Team	W		L	W		L
Eastern Division
No. 1 Florida x$	8	–	0	12	–	1
No. 9 Tennessee	7	–	1	10	–	2
South Carolina	4	–	4	6	–	5
Kentucky	3	–	5	4	–	7
Georgia	3	–	5	5	–	6
Vanderbilt	0	–	8	2	–	9
Western Division
No. 11 Alabama xy	6	–	2	10	–	3
No. 12 LSU x	6	–	2	10	–	2
No. 24 Auburn	4	–	4	8	–	4
Mississippi State	3	–	5	5	–	6
Ole Miss	2	–	6	5	–	6
Arkansas	2	–	6	4	–	7
Championship: Florida 45, Alabama 30
$ – Conference champion; x – Division champion/co-champions; y – Championship game participant; Rankings from AP Poll

The 1996 Florida Gators football team represented the University of Florida in the sport of American football during the 1996 NCAA Division I-A football season. The 1996 season was the team's seventh under head coach Steve Spurrier. The Gators competed in the Southeastern Conference (SEC) and played their home games at Ben Hill Griffin Stadium on the university's Gainesville, Florida campus.

The Gators posted a 12–1 record and won their fifth consecutive SEC Eastern Division title, their fourth straight SEC Championship Game, and their first national championship in team history, with a 52–20 Sugar Bowl rout of their in-state rivals, the Florida State Seminoles.

The Gators used coach Spurrier's pass-heavy "fun 'n gun" offense". Quarterback Danny Wuerffel won the Heisman Trophy. Wuerffel as well as his wide receivers Ike Hilliard and Reidel Anthony were consensus All-Americans. The Gators outscored their opponents 612–221.

The 1996 Gators were the last first-time national champions until Indiana in 2025.

== Schedule ==
Date	Opponent	Rank	Site	TV	Result	Attendance	Source
August 31	Southwestern Louisiana*	No. 4	Ben Hill Griffin Stadium; Gainesville, FL		W 55–21	85,050	
September 7	No. 14 (I-AA) Georgia Southern*	No. 4	Ben Hill Griffin Stadium; Gainesville, FL	SS	W 62–14	84,963	
September 21	at No. 2 Tennessee	No. 4	Neyland Stadium; Knoxville, TN (rivalry, College GameDay)	CBS	W 35–29	107,608	
September 28	Kentucky	No. 1	Ben Hill Griffin Stadium; Gainesville, FL (rivalry)	CBS	W 65–0	85,422	
October 5	at Arkansas	No. 1	Razorback Stadium; Fayetteville, AR	JPS	W 42–7	52,318	
October 12	No. 12 LSU^{†}	No. 1	Ben Hill Griffin Stadium; Gainesville, FL (rivalry)	CBS	W 56–13	85,567	
October 19	No. 16 Auburn	No. 1	Ben Hill Griffin Stadium; Gainesville, FL (rivalry)	CBS	W 51–10	85,697	
November 2	vs. Georgia	No. 1	Jacksonville Municipal Stadium; Jacksonville, FL (rivalry)	CBS	W 47–7	84,103	
November 9	at Vanderbilt	No. 1	Vanderbilt Stadium; Nashville, TN	JPS	W 28–21	40,249	
November 16	South Carolina	No. 1	Ben Hill Griffin Stadium; Gainesville, FL	ESPN	W 52–25	85,701	
November 30	at No. 2 Florida State*	No. 1	Doak Campbell Stadium; Tallahassee, FL (rivalry, College GameDay)	ABC	L 21–24	80,932	
December 7	vs. No. 11 Alabama	No. 4	Georgia Dome; Atlanta, GA (SEC Championship, rivalry)	ABC	W 45–30	74,132	
January 2, 1997	vs. No. 1 Florida State*	No. 3	Louisiana Superdome; New Orleans, LA (Sugar Bowl, College GameDay)	ABC	W 52–20	78,344	
*Non-conference game; ^{†}Homecoming; Rankings from AP Poll released prior to the game; Source:

== Before the season ==
The Gators started the season ranked fourth as they aimed for a fourth consecutive SEC title.

== Game summaries ==
=== Southwestern Louisiana ===
Team	1	2	3	4	Total
Ragin' Cajuns	0	0	14	7	21
• No. 4 Gators	7	28	7	13	55

- Date: August 31
- Location: Ben Hill Griffin Stadium, Gainesville, Florida
- Game attendance: 85,050

Scoring summary
1	13:34	FLA	Terry Jackson run (Bart Edmiston kick)	FLA 7-0
2	14:40	FLA	Lawrence Wright fumble return (Bart Edmiston kick)	FLA 14-0
2	8:51	FLA	Ike Hilliard pass from Brian Schottenheimer (Bart Edmiston kick)	FLA 21-0
2	8:29	FLA	Ike Hilliard pass from Danny Wuerffel (Bart Edmiston kick)	FLA 28-0
2	6:16	FLA	Fred Weary fumble return (Bart Edmiston kick)	FLA 35-0
3	9:32	SWL	Buford pass from Delhomme (Deach kick)	FLA 35-7
3	7:13	FLA	Brown interception return (Bart Edmiston kick)	FLA 42-7
3	3:18	SWL	Jackson fumble return (Deach kick)	FLA 42-14
4	14:22	SWL	Richard pass from Delhomme (Deach kick)	FLA 42-21
4	9:54	FLA	Bart Edmiston field goal	FLA 45-21
4	7:28	FLA	Fred Weary interception return (Bart Edmiston kick)	FLA 52-21
4	2:03	FLA	Bart Edmiston field goal	FLA 55-21

In the season opener at the Swamp, Florida beat Southwestern Louisiana 55–21.

Bob Stoops's Gator defense held the Cajuns scoreless in the first half, and scored four touchdowns (as much as the offense). Cornerback Fred Weary himself accounted for two touchdowns.

=== No. 14 (I–AA) Georgia Southern ===
Team	1	2	3	4	Total
No. 14 (I–AA) Eagles	7	0	7	0	14
• No. 4 Gators	14	21	20	7	62

- Date: September 7
- Location: Ben Hill Griffin Stadium, Gainesville, Florida
- Game attendance: 84,962

Scoring summary
1	12:09	FLA	Reidel Anthony pass from Danny Wuerffel (Bart Edmiston kick)	FLA 7-0
1	4:35	GSU	Russell run (Stalnaker kick)	7-7
1	2:26	FLA	Terry Jackson run (Bart Edmiston kick)	FLA 14-7
2	10:38	FLA	Terry Jackson run (Bart Edmiston kick)	FLA 21-7
2	9:57	FLA	Davis fumble return (Bart Edmiston kick)	FLA 28-7
2	4:52	FLA	Elijah Williams run (Bart Edmiston kick)	FLA 35-7
3	13:26	FLA	Jacquez Green pass from Danny Wuerffel (Bart Edmiston kick)	FLA 42-7
3	7:02	GSU	Cunningham run (Stalnaker kick)	FLA 42-14
3	5:17	FLA	McCaslin run (Bart Edmiston kick)	FLA 49-14
3	0:01	FLA	Brian Schottenheimer run (kick failed)	FLA 55-14
4	3:36	FLA	McCaslin run (Cooper kick)	FLA 62-14

In the second week of play, the Gators romped with a 62–14 defeat of Georgia Southern. The offense was back after misfiring in the opener as Danny Wuerffel had a near perfect game, completing 15 of 16 passes for and two touchdowns.

The defense underperformed, giving up 311 yards to Georgia Southern's flexbone attack.

=== At No. 2 Tennessee ===
Team	1	2	3	4	Total
• No. 4 Gators	14	21	0	0	35
No. 2 Volunteers	0	6	10	13	29

- Date: September 21
- Location: Neyland Stadium, Knoxville, Tennessee
- Game attendance: 107,608
- TV announcers (CBS): Jim Nantz & Terry Donahue

Scoring summary
1	12:00	FLA	Reidel Anthony pass from Danny Wuerffel (Bart Edmiston kick)	FLA 7-0
1	10:34	FLA	Terry Jackson pass from Danny Wuerffel (Bart Edmiston kick)	FLA 14-0
2	11:57	FLA	Ike Hilliard pass from Danny Wuerffel (Bart Edmiston kick)	FLA 21-0
2	11:03	FLA	Jacquez Green pass from Danny Wuerffel (Bart Edmiston kick)	FLA 28-0
2	10:06	FLA	Anthone Lott fumble return (Bart Edmiston kick)	FLA 35-0
2	9:47	TEN	Peerless Price pass from Peyton Manning (two-point conversion failed)	FLA 35-6
3	11:14	TEN	Jeff Hall field goal	FLA 35-9
3	2:21	TEN	Andy McCullough pass from Peyton Manning (Jeff Hall kick)	FLA 35-16
4	8:01	TEN	Eric Lane pass from Peyton Manning (two-point conversion failed)	FLA 35-22
4	0:10	TEN	Andy McCullough pass from Peyton Manning (Jeff Hall kick)	FLA 35-29

The third game was a showdown between No. 4 Florida and No. 2 Tennessee. Volunteers quarterback Peyton Manning had not beaten the Gators in two previous attempts, and after a second-half meltdown a year earlier in Gainesville, the Volunteers were looking to exact revenge on their SEC East rival in Knoxville. The game featured two of the top quarterbacks in college football, Manning and Florida's Danny Wuerffel. Both teams featured strong aerial attacks, but Florida's Fred Taylor and Tennessee's Jay Graham were among the SEC's best tailbacks. ESPN's College Gameday was on hand to broadcast their pregame show live from Knoxville.

The tone for the game was set on Florida's first drive, as Spurrier spurned the punt team on a 4th and 10 from the UT 35, and Wuerffel connected with Reidel Anthony for a touchdown to put the Gators up 7–0. Teako Brown intercepted Manning on the Volunteers' first drive, and it took Wuerffel only one play to find the end zone again, hitting Terry Jackson from out to extend the lead to 14–0. Florida doubled their lead in a 52-second stretch early in the 2nd quarter, as Ike Hilliard and Jacquez Green became the third and fourth different receivers with touchdown receptions on the afternoon, sandwiched around a James Bates interception of Manning. Anthone Lott's fumble return stretched the lead to 35–0, before Manning finally got the Vols on the scoreboard before halftime on a strike to Peerless Price.

External videos
- Tennessee game, YouTube video.

With Florida switching to a more conservative offensive game plan in the second half, Manning cut the lead to 35–22 with 8 minutes left with 2 more touchdown tosses, including a second to Price. Andy McCellough's reception brought the Vols within 35–29 with 10 seconds to play, but Florida recovered the ensuing onside kick to hang on for a six-point win on a rainy Knoxville afternoon. (Note: Tennessee bounced back to stay in the national title picture at 6–1 before being stunned on the road at Memphis, and finished 10–2, defeating Northwestern in the Citrus Bowl.) Florida limited tailback Jay Graham to on 12 carries, while Manning threw for a school-record .

=== Kentucky ===
Team	1	2	3	4	Total
Wildcats	0	0	0	0	0
• No. 1 Gators	21	20	17	7	65

- Date: September 28
- Location: Ben Hill Griffin Stadium, Gainesville, Florida
- Game attendance: 85,422

Scoring summary
1	13:57	FLA	Ike Hilliard pass from Danny Wuerffel (Bart Edmiston kick)	FLA 7-0
1		FLA	Bart Edmiston field goal	FLA 10-0
1	4:24	FLA	Reidel Anthony pass from Danny Wuerffel (Bart Edmiston kick)	FLA 17-0
1	0:10	FLA	Bart Edmiston field goal	FLA 20-0
2	10:54	FLA	Reidel Anthony pass from Danny Wuerffel (Bart Edmiston kick)	FLA 34-0
2	7:33	FLA	Fred Taylor run (Bart Edmiston kick)	FLA 34-0
2	0:00	FLA	Elijah Williams run (Bart Edmiston kick)	FLA 41-0
3	12:17	FLA	Jacquez Green punt return (Bart Edmiston kick)	FLA 48-0
3	9:17	FLA	Jacquez Green punt return (Bart Edmiston kick)	FLA 55-0
3	3:13	FLA	Bart Edmiston field goal	FLA 58-0
4	9:56	FLA	Richardson pass from Doug Johnson (Cooper kick)	FLA 65-0

Coming off a big win in Knoxville the week before and being ranked #1 for the first time since 1994, the Gators were looking for somewhat of an easy home game against the Kentucky Wildcats. This would prove true as the Gators posted their first shutout since a 31–0 drubbing of Tennessee in Knoxville in 1994, with Florida defeating Kentucky 65–0.

The Gators scored just 63 seconds into the game with a touchdown pass from Danny Wuerffel to Ike Hilliard. Wuerffel would have 3 touchdown passes in all, but the day belonged to Jacquez Green. In the 3rd quarter, Green took a punt back for a touchdown. On Kentucky's next possession, they would punt again and Green, who was still breathing heavy from his first return, weaved his way for another score. In all, the Gators amassed over 300 return yards from punts and kickoffs. Fred Taylor made his season debut with 45 yards on six attempts.

=== At Arkansas ===
Team	1	2	3	4	Total
• No. 1 Gators	14	0	14	14	42
Razorbacks	0	7	0	0	7

- Date: October 5
- Location: Razorback Stadium, Fayetteville, Arkansas
- Game attendance: 52,318

Scoring summary
1	11:55	FLA	Reidel Anthony 56-yard pass from Danny Wuerffel (Bart Edmiston kick)	FLA 7-0
1	0:39	FLA	Terry Jackson 1-yard run (Bart Edmiston kick)	FLA 14-0
2	5:07	ARK	Burks 1-yard run (Latourette kick)	FLA 14-7
3	10:03	FLA	Reidel Anthony 23-yard pass from Danny Wuerffel (Bart Edmiston kick)	FLA 21-7
3	5:34	FLA	Reidel Anthony 6-yard pass from Danny Wuerffel (Bart Edmiston kick)	FLA 28-7
4	14:55	FLA	Ike Hilliard 7-yard pass from Danny Wuerffel (Bart Edmiston kick)	FLA 35-7
4	8:52	FLA	McCaslin 18-yard run (Bart Edmiston kick)	FLA 42-7

Florida traveled to Fayetteville and beat Arkansas 42–7. The Gators had an abysmal second quarter, but recovered and Danny Wuerffel threw for a then-school record of 462 yards.

A defensive stand and missed field goal by Arkansas to start the second half "jolted the Gators back to life." Wuerffel then passed for three touchdowns.

=== No. 12 LSU ===
Team	1	2	3	4	Total
No. 12 Tigers	0	6	0	7	13
• No. 1 Gators	14	28	0	14	56

- Date: October 12
- Location: Ben Hill Griffin Stadium, Gainesville, Florida
- Game attendance: 85,567

Scoring summary
1	12:53	FLA	Reidel Anthony 13-yard pass from Danny Wuerffel (Bart Edmiston kick)	FLA 7-0
1	4:29	FLA	Danny Wuerffel 1-yard run (Bart Edmiston kick)	FLA 14-0
2	13:34	LSU	Foster 8-yard pass from Tyler (Kick blocked)	FLA 14-6
2	11:40	FLA	Terry Jackson 2-yard run (Bart Edmiston kick)	FLA 21-6
2	7:26	FLA	Jacquez Green 7-yard run (Bart Edmiston kick)	FLA 28-6
2	6:27	FLA	Ike Hilliard 7-yard pass from Danny Wuerffel (Bart Edmiston kick)	FLA 35-6
2	3:27	FLA	Elijah Williams 45-yard run (Bart Edmiston kick)	FLA 42-6
4	14:36	FLA	Ike Hilliard 8-yard pass from Danny Wuerffel (Bart Edmiston kick)	FLA 49-6
4	11:58	LSU	Mealey 2-yard run (Richie kick)	FLA 49-13
4	6:13	FLA	McCaslin 5-yard run (Bart Edmiston kick)	FLA 56-13

#12 LSU was the first top 25 team the Gators would play at home. The Gators beat the Tigers 56–13.

LSU came in undefeated on the campaign and featured an offense that scored 38 points per game. Florida, however, was not thinking upset, as Danny Wuerffel threw three touchdowns, two of them to Ike Hilliard, and ran for another score as the Gators proved to have the better offense. Fred Taylor had a breakout game, running for 107 yards on 16 carries.

Their defense came to play as well as they forced two turnovers and recorded 7 sacks and held the LSU offense to just 28 rushing yards.

=== No. 16 Auburn ===
Team	1	2	3	4	Total
No. 16 Tigers	7	3	0	0	10
• No. 1 Gators	7	14	16	14	51

- Date: October 19
- Location: Ben Hill Griffin Stadium, Gainesville, Florida
- Game start: 3:30 p.m.
- Game attendance: 85,697

Scoring summary
1	12:00	FLA	Reidel Anthony 24-yard pass from Danny Wuerffel (Bart Edmiston kick)	FLA 7-0
1	3:52	AUB	Cooper 7-yard run (Holmes kick)	7-7
2	14:58	FLA	Danny Wuerffel 1-yard run (Bart Edmiston kick)	FLA 14-7
2	12:00	FLA	Terry Jackson 1-yard run (Bart Edmiston kick)	FLA 21-7
2	3:17	AUB	Holmes 41-yard field goal	FLA 21-10
3	11:57	FLA	Bart Edmiston 25-yard field goal	FLA 24-10
3		FLA	Reidel Anthony 8-yard pass from Danny Wuerffel (Kick failed)	FLA 30-10
3	7:26	FLA	Elijah Williams 14-yard run (Bart Edmiston kick)	FLA 37-10
4	8:32	FLA	Ike Hilliard 18-yard pass from Danny Wuerffel (Bart Edmiston kick)	FLA 44-10
4	5:16	FLA	Terry Jackson 10-yard run (Bart Edmiston kick)	FLA 51-10

Next was another ranked team, as 16th ranked Auburn came to Gainesville. The first half may have been closer than most would have expected, as Auburn kicked a field goal late to trail just 21–10. But that would be it for the Tigers as the Gators reeled off 30 unanswered points en route to a 51–10 win.

Like the LSU game, the Gators scored quick and often, amassing over 600 yards of offense and holding Auburn to just 173 yards. Danny Wuerffel again threw for 3 touchdowns and ran for another for the red-hot Florida offense. Taylor ran for 110 yards on 14 carries.

=== Vs. Georgia ===
#1 Florida Gators vs. Georgia Bulldogs

Quarter	1	2	3	4	Total
No. 1 Gators	20	14	0	13	47
Bulldogs	0	0	0	7	7

at Alltel Stadium • Jacksonville, Florida

- Date: November 2
- Game attendance: 84,103
- Box score

Game information

Georgia

- Bobo
  9/20, 113 Yds, INT
- Kirtsey
  15 Rush, 71 Yds
- Allen
  5 Rec, 44 Yds

Florida

- Wuerffel
  16/23, 279 Yds, 4 TD, INT
- Williams
  10 Rush, 94 Yds
- Anthony
  7 Rec, 98 Yds, 2 TD

Top ranked Florida was coming in looking to win its 7th consecutive game against Georgia in the World's Largest Outdoor Cocktail Party. At the end of the day, Alltel Stadium was half teal (teal seats in the stadium representing the primary color of the NFL's Jacksonville Jaguars) and half orange and blue as the Gators won 47–7. By this point in the season, Florida was bruising their opponents by an average score of 52–12.

Danny Wuerffel again would have an outstanding game, bolstering his Heisman Trophy candidacy, with 279 yards passing and 4 touchdowns. The Gators also amassed over 200 yards rushing. The Gator defense held the Dawgs to just 272 yards and one touchdown on the day.

Scoring summary

Quarter	Time	Drive			Team	Scoring information	Score	
Quarter	Time	Plays	Yards	TOP	Team	Scoring information	UGA	FLA
1					Florida	Taylor 2-yard touchdown run, Edmiston kick good	7	0
1					Florida	Anthony 20-yard touchdown reception from Wuerffel, Edmiston kick no good	13	0
1	2:02				Florida	Anthony 21-yard touchdown reception from Wuerffel, Edmiston kick good	20	0
2					Florida	Allen 19-yard touchdown reception from Wuerffel, Edmiston kick good	27	0
2	4:19				Florida	Green 11-yard touchdown reception from Wuerffel, Edmiston kick good	34	0
4					Florida	27-yard field goal by Edmiston	37	0
4					Georgia	Pass 9-yard touchdown run, Hines kick good	37	7
4					Florida	23-yard field goal by Edmiston	40	7
4	2:23				Florida	Ross 14-yard touchdown reception from Johnson, Edmiston kick good	47	7
"TOP" = time of possession. For other American football terms, see Glossary of American football.							47	7

=== At Vanderbilt ===
Team	1	2	3	4	Total
• No. 1 Gators	7	14	7	0	28
Commodores	3	0	11	7	21

- Date: November 9
- Location: Vanderbilt Stadium, Nashville, Tennessee
- Game attendance: 40,249

Scoring summary
1	10:54	VAN	Brett Speakman 27-yard field goal	VAN 3-0
1	8:30	FLA	Reidel Anthony 14-yard pass from Danny Wuerffel (Bart Edmiston kick)	FLA 7-3
2	14:51	FLA	Jacquez Green 28-yard pass from Danny Wuerffel (Bart Edmiston kick)	FLA 14-3
2	8:36	FLA	Ike Hilliard 31-yard pass from Danny Wuerffel (Bart Edmiston kick)	FLA 21-3
3	10:00	VAN	Brett Speakman 27-yard field goal	FLA 21-6
3	7:04	FLA	Jacquez Green 9-yard pass from Danny Wuerffel (Bart Edmiston kick)	FLA 28-6
3	2:07	VAN	Jamie Duncan 31-yard fumble return (Allen pass to Todd Yoder)	FLA 28-14
4	13:21	VAN	Jason Dunnavant 34-yard run (Brett Speakman kick)	FLA 28-21

Hampered by penalties throughout, the Gators survived a scare with the Vanderbilt Commodores in Nashville 28–21.

After an injury to tackle Zach Piller, Vanderbilt sacked and stripped Danny Wuerffel, and Jamie Duncan returned the fumble for a touchdown. A 2-point conversion on a pass to Todd Yoder brought the score to 28–14 and inspired the Commodores. Early in the fourth quarter, Vanderbilt back Jason Dunnavant broke off a 34-yard touchdown run and the score was 28–21. Vanderbilt missed a field goal, and one final drive was stopped at its own 47-yard line.

Overcoming five sacks, Wuerffel passed for 283 yards and four touchdowns.

=== South Carolina ===
Team	1	2	3	4	Total
Gamecocks	6	9	7	3	25
• No. 1 Gators	14	14	7	17	52

- Date: November 16
- Location: Ben Hill Griffin Stadium, Gainesville, Florida
- Game attendance: 85,701

Scoring summary
1	8:57	SC	Wright 7-yard run (Run failed)	SC 6-0
1	5:20	FLA	Fred Taylor 5-yard run (Bart Edmiston kick)	FLA 7-6
1	3:20	FLA	Jacquez Green 56-yard pass from Danny Wuerffel (Bart Edmiston kick)	FLA 14-6
2	14:48	FLA	Reidel Anthony 52-yard pass from Danny Wuerffel (Bart Edmiston kick)	FLA 21-6
2	9:59	SC	Wright 8-yard run (Run failed)	FLA 21-12
2	6:53	FLA	Terry Jackson 4-yard run (Bart Edmiston kick)	FLA 28-12
2	0:02	SC	Morton 27-yard field goal	FLA 28-15
3	13:28	FLA	Peterson 9-yard blocked punt return (Bart Edmiston kick)	FLA 35-15
3	0:51	SC	Williams 2-yard run (Leavitt kick)	FLA 35-22
4	13:13	FLA	Bart Edmiston 21-yard field goal	FLA 38-22
4	8:06	FLA	Fred Taylor 27-yard run (Bart Edmiston kick)	FLA 45-22
4	3:49	FLA	Fred Taylor 25-yard run (Bart Edmiston kick)	FLA 52-22
4	0:03	SC	Leavitt 32-yard field goal	FLA 52-25

The Gators struggled despite a 52–25 win over the South Carolina Gamecocks. Wuerffel had an off-day, especially late, and never failed to find a passing rhythm; but was helped by Fred Taylor to lift Florida over the Gamecocks. Spurrier became the Gators' all-time winningest coach, surpassing Ray Graves' 70 career wins. Spurrier gave Graves a game ball, who gave a talk to the team.

Early on in the game, Wuerffel threw a 56-yard touchdown pass to Jacquez Green and a 52-yard touchdown pass to Reidel Anthony. Taylor ran for 139 yards and three touchdowns on 21 carries on the day.

=== At No. 2 Florida State ===
Team	1	2	3	4	Total
No. 1 Gators	0	14	0	7	21
• No. 2 Seminoles	17	0	0	7	24

- Date: November 30
- Location: Doak Campbell Stadium, Tallahassee, Florida
- Game attendance: 80,932

Scoring summary
1	FSU	Bentley 26-yard field goal	FSU 3-0
1	FSU	Williams 3-yard run (Bentley kick)	FSU 10-0
1	FSU	Pearsall 1-yard pass from Thad Busby (Bentley kick)	FSU 17-0
2	FLA	Jacquez Green 1-yard pass from Danny Wuerffel (Bart Edmiston kick)	FSU 17-7
2	FLA	Jacquez Green 9-yard pass from Danny Wuerffel (Bart Edmiston kick)	FSU 17-14
4	FSU	Williams 1-yard run (Bentley kick)	FSU 24-14
4	FLA	Reidel Anthony 2-yard pass from Danny Wuerffel (Cooper kick)	FSU 24-21

The rival Florida State Seminoles defeated the Gators 24–21, seemingly ending Florida's chance at a national title. For the first time in series history, both squads were an undefeated 10–0. The Seminoles scored 17 straight points in the first quarter and Warrick Dunn rushed for a career-best 185 yards.

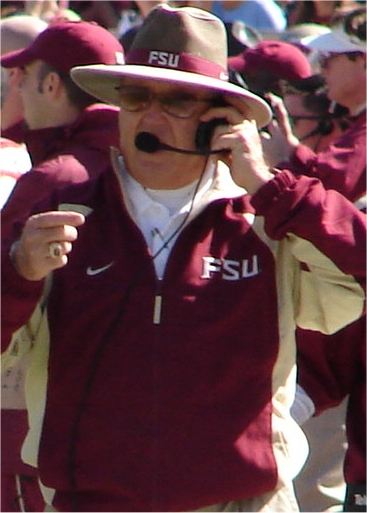
"We just hit to the echo" said FSU coach Bobby Bowden (pictured)

The Seminoles also had one of the best defenses in the nation, with a savage pass rush which included All-Americans Peter Boulware and Reinard Wilson. The Seminoles had been flagged for roughing the passer twice during the game, and Spurrier had the UF video staff compile footage which he claimed showed FSU players tackling Wuerffel late a half-dozen additional times. Gator receiver Reidel Anthony still managed career bests in receptions (11) and yards gained (193). "If Danny would have had more time, we would have killed them. I was getting past them all the time with all kinds of routes." Florida had 443 yards of offense, but Wuerffel threw three interceptions and was sacked six times.

External videos
- FSU game, YouTube video.

The third quarter was scoreless as both teams played well on defense. FSU's "Pooh Bear" Williams got the ball into the endzone to put the Seminoles up 24–14 midway through the fourth quarter. Down late, Florida went 80 yards in eight plays, including a 31-yard pass to Anthony, down to the 3-yard line. A short pass to Anthony brought Florida within a field goal with just over a minute left. The subsequent onside kick went out of bounds, and the game was sealed when Dunn ran for a first down. Spurrier continued to complain to the press about the late hits while FSU coach Bobby Bowden responded that he thought the hits in question were clean while admitting that "we just hit to the echo (of the whistle), instead of the whistle."

== Postseason ==
=== Vs. No. 11 Alabama (SEC Championship) ===
SEC Championship

Team	1	2	3	4	Total
No. 11 Crimson Tide	7	7	14	2	30
• No. 4 Gators	6	18	14	7	45

- Date: December 7
- Location: Georgia Dome, Atlanta, Georgia
- Game attendance: 74,132

Scoring summary
1	8:52	ALA	Riddle 36-yard pass from Kitchens (Brock kick)	ALA 7-0
1	3:11	FLA	Ike Hilliard 46-yard pass from Danny Wuerffel (kick blocked)	ALA 7-6
2	14:37	FLA	Reidel Anthony 21-yard pass from Danny Wuerffel (Anthony pass from Wuerffel)	FLA 14-7
2	12:35	FLA	Elijah Williams 45-yard pass from Danny Wuerffel (Cooper kick)	FLA 21-7
2	7:29	FLA	Cooper 35-yard field goal	FLA 24-7
2	0:39	ALA	Vaughn 8-yard pass from Kitchens (Brock kick)	FLA 24-14
3	9:12	ALA	Riddle 5-yard run (Brock kick)	FLA 24-21
3	5:14	FLA	Reidel Anthony 13-yard pass from Danny Wuerffel (Cooper kick)	FLA 31-21
3	4:06	ALA	Vaughn 94-yard pass from Kitchens (Brock kick)	FLA 31-28
3	3:09	FLA	Jacquez Green 85-yard pass from Danny Wuerffel (Cooper kick)	FLA 38-28
4	14:54	FLA	Reidel Anthony 21-yard pass (Cooper kick)	FLA 45-28
4	4:32	ALA	Safety, Wuerffel ran out of endzone	FLA 45-30

Statistics	ALA	FLA
First downs	13	22
Total yards	296	470
Rushing yards	27	69
Passing yards	269	401
Passing: comp–att–int	20–46–1	20–35–2
Turnovers	1	2

Team	Category	Player	Statistics
ALA	Passing	Freddie Kitchens	19/45, 264 yards, 3 TD, INT
ALA	Rushing	Dennis Riddle	17 rushes, 42 yards, TD
ALA	Receiving	Michael Vaughn	5 receptions, 142 yards, 2 TD
Florida	Passing	Danny Wuerffel	20/35, 401 yards, 6 TD, 2 INT
Florida	Rushing	Fred Taylor	13 rushes, 83 yards
Florida	Receiving	Reidel Anthony	11 receptions, 171 yards, 3 TD

The Gators beat the Alabama Crimson Tide 45–30 in the SEC Championship, as Wuerffel passed for six touchdowns. A 94-yard touchdown pass from Alabama to pull within 3 was answered by an 85-yard touchdown to Jacquez Green.

Texas also upset Nebraska in the inaugural Big 12 Championship, securing the Gators a spot in the Sugar Bowl. To have a shot at a national title, the Gators needed Ohio State to beat second-ranked Arizona State—the only team to go through the regular season undefeated—in the Rose Bowl, which they did with seconds left, setting up the Sugar Bowl as the Bowl Alliance national championship game.

=== Vs. No. 1 Florida State (Sugar Bowl – BA NCG) ===
Sugar Bowl

Team	1	2	3	4	Total
• No. 3 Gators	10	14	14	14	52
No. 1 Seminoles	3	14	3	0	20

- Date: January 2, 1997
- Location: Louisiana Superdome, New Orleans, Louisiana
- Game attendance: 78,344
- Game weather: Indoors (dome)
- TV announcers (ABC): Keith Jackson

Scoring summary
1	9:48	FLA	Ike Hilliard 9-yard pass from Danny Wuerffel (Bart Edmiston kick)	FLA 7-0
1	7:49	FSU	Bentley 43-yard field goal	FLA 7-3
1	2:44	FLA	Bart Edmiston 32-yard field goal	FLA 10-3
2	11:28	FLA	Fred Taylor 2-yard run (Bart Edmiston kick)	FLA 17-3
2	7:28	FSU	E. C. Green 29-yard pass from Thad Busby (Bentley kick)	FLA 17-10
2	5:18	FLA	Ike Hilliard 31-yard pass from Danny Wuerffel (Bart Edmiston kick)	FLA 24-10
2	0:40	FSU	Warrick Dunn 12-yard run (Bentley kick)	FLA 24-17
3	10:45	FSU	Bentley 45-yard field goal	FLA 24-20
3	5:43	FLA	Ike Hilliard 7-yard pass from Danny Wuerffel (Bart Edmiston kick)	FLA 31-20
3	0:13	FLA	Danny Wuerffel 16-yard run (Bart Edmiston kick)	FLA 38-20
4	8:52	FLA	Terry Jackson 42-yard run (Bart Edmiston kick)	FLA 45-20
4	2:12	FLA	Terry Jackson 1-yard run (Bart Edmiston kick)	FLA 52-20

Statistics	FLA	FSU
First downs	26	13
Total yards	474	313
Rushing yards	168	42
Passing yards	306	271
Passing: comp–att–int	18–34–1	17–42–2
Turnovers	1	2

Team	Category	Player	Statistics
FLA	Passing	Danny Wuerffel	18/34, 306 yards, 3 TD, INT
FLA	Rushing	Terry Jackson	12 rushes, 118 yards, 2 TD
FLA	Receiving	Ike Hilliard	7 receptions, 150 yards, 3 TD
Florida State	Passing	Thad Busby	17/41, 271 yards, TD, INT
Florida State	Rushing	Warrick Dunn	9 rushes, 28 yards
Florida State	Receiving	E. G. Green	3 receptions, 86 yards, TD

The Gators used the shotgun formation to give Wuerffel more time to throw and defeated FSU in a rematch 52–20, for their first national title.

Hilliard scored once on a "stop and pop" where he stopped on a dime to avoid Seminole defenders, then ran into the endzone. A 42-yard Terry Jackson touchdown run sealed the victory.

=== Awards and honors ===
==== National award winners ====
Along with a national title, quarterback Danny Wuerffel was awarded the Heisman Trophy, annually awarded to college football's top player. He was also awarded the Maxwell Award, Walter Camp Award, Davey O'Brien Award, Johnny Unitas Golden Arm Award, as well as the Draddy Trophy, National Football Foundation and College Hall of Fame Scholar, and College Football Association Scholar-Athlete Team. Lawrence Wright won the Jim Thorpe Award, and was on the College Football Association Scholar-Athlete Team. Jeff Mitchell was an Outland Trophy semi-finalist.

External videos
- 1997 Sugar Bowl, YouTube video.

Wuerffel, Ike Hilliard, and Reidel Anthony all were consensus All-Americans.

==== NFL draft ====
Ike Hilliard was selected 7th overall by the New York Giants, and Reidel Anthony was selected 16th by the Tampa Bay Buccaneers

== Personnel ==
=== Depth chart ===
Offense

WR	WR
Reidel Anthony	Jamie Richardson
Nafis Karim	Travis McGriff

LT	LG	C	RG	RT
Zach Piller	Ryan Kalich	Jeff Mitchell	Donnie Young	Mo Collins
Donnie Young	Deac Story	Corey Yarbrough	Cheston Blackshear	Scott Bryan

TE
Tremayne Allen
Teras Ross
Erron Kinney

WR
Ike Hilliard
Jacquez Green

QB
Danny Wuerffel
Brian Schottenheimer
Doug Johnson
Noah Brindise

FB
Dwayne Mobley
Jerome Evans
Terry Jackson

TB
Fred Taylor
Elijah Williams
Terry Jackson
Eugene McCaslin

Defense

CB
Fred Weary
Shea Showers

FS
Shea Showers
Teako Brown
Mike Harris

DE	DT	DT	DE
Tim Beauchamp	Ed Chester	Reggie McGrew	Anthony Mitchell
Willie Rodgers	Keith Council	Mike Moten	Cameron Davis

WLB	MLB	SLB
Johnny Rutledge	James Bates	Mike Peterson
Keith Kelsey	Dwayne Thomas	Jevon Kearse

CB
Anthone Lott
Tony George
Ronnie Battle

SS
Lawrence Wright
Demetric Jackson

=== Roster ===
1996 Florida Gators roster
Quarterbacks: 7 Danny Wuerffel – Senior; 12 Doug Johnson – Freshman; 16 Brian Schottenheimer – Senior; 17 Noah Brindise – Junior; Running backs: 6 Daymon Carroll – Freshman; Tailbacks: 3 Eugene McCaslin – Freshman; 21 Fred Taylor – Junior; 22 Terry Jackson – Sophomore; 23 Dwayne Mobley – Senior; 25 Elijah Williams – Junior; Fullbacks: 34 Jerome Evans – Senior; 35 Ernie Dubose – Junior; 36 Jayme Campbell – Freshman; 40 Rod Frazier – Freshman; Tight ends: 80 Shawn Nunn – Senior; 82 Dwight Edge – Freshman; 88 Taras Ross – Junior; 89 Erron Kinney – Freshman; 91 Tremayne Allen – Senior	Wide receivers: 3 Travis McGriff – Sophomore; 5 Jacquez Green – Sophomore; 8 Nafis Karim – Sophomore; 15 Reidel Anthony – Junior; 18 Jamie Richardson – Freshman; 19 Ike Hilliard – Junior; 20 Tyrone Baker – Junior; 31 Craig Dudley – Freshman; 83 Jason Dean – Senior; 84 David Nabavi – Senior; 85 Ian Skinner – Freshman; 67 Henry Kupczyk – Senior; Offensive line: 51 Ryan Kalich – Freshman; 57 Scott Bryan - Freshman; 59 Wyley Ritch – Junior; 62 Corey Yarbrough – Freshman; 65 Sean Ladd – Sophomore; 69 Zach Piller – Sophomore; 70 Cooper Carlisle – Freshman; 71 Jeff Mitchell – Senior; 72 Deac Story – Sophomore; 73 Pat Browning – Sophomore; 74 Zac Zedalis – Freshman; 75 Donnie Young – Senior; 77 Cheston Blackshear – Freshman; 78 Todd Holland – Junior; 79 Mo Collins – Sophomore	Defensive line: 53 Thaddeus Bullard – Freshman; 54 Willie Rodgers – Junior; 55 Willie Cohens – Sophomore; 56 Cameron Davis – Senior; 61 Buck Gurley – Freshman; 64 Derrick Chambers – Freshman; 66 Keith Council – Junior; 90 Mike Moten – Junior; 92 Reggie McGrew – Freshman; 93 Tim Beauchamp – Sophomore; 94 Ed Chester – Sophomore; 96 Ernie Badeaux – Freshman; 98 Anthony Mitchell – Freshman; 99 McDonald Ferguson – Senior; Linebackers: 22 Terry Jackson – Sophomore; 29 Mike Peterson – Sophomore; 30 Daryl Owens – Freshman; 39 Teddy Sims – Freshman; 41 Keith Kelsey – Freshman; 42 Jevon Kearse – Sophomore; 44 James Bates – Senior; 46 Xavier McCray – Junior; 49 Zuri Buchanan – Freshman; 50 Kavin Walton – Junior; 52 Dwayne Thomas – Junior; 58 Johnny Rutledge – Sophomore; 64 Jason Perry – Sophomore	Cornerbacks: 2 Shea Showers – Senior; 9 Anthone Lott – Senior; 10 Ronnie Battle – Junior; 24 Fred Weary – Junior; 28 Dock Pollard – Freshman; 48 Cedric Warren – Freshman; Defensive backs: 38 Demetrius Lewis – Freshman; Safeties: 1 Tony George – Sophomore; 4 Lawrence Wright – Senior; 13 Mike Harris – Junior; 26 Jon Xynidis – Junior; 27 Demetric Jackson – Senior; 33 Teako Brown – Sophomore; 37 Reggie Davis – Freshman; 47 Rod Graddy – Freshman; 38 James Gray – Sophomore; Punters: 43 Matt Teague – Senior; 87 Robby Stevenson – Sophomore; Kickers: 14 Bart Edmiston – Senior; 43 Matt Teague – Senior; Long snappers: 76 Mike Younkin – Freshman; 68 Scott Wise – Freshman; 60 Fred Hagberg – Junior

=== Coaching staff ===
- Steve Spurrier (Florida '67)– Head coach
- Rod Broadway (North Carolina '77) – Defensive tackles
- Jim Collins (Elon College '74) – Recruiting coordinator, Will and Mike Linebackers
- Dwayne Dixon (Florida '85) – Assistant head coach, Wide receivers
- Carl Franks (Duke '82) – Assistant offensive coordinator, Running backs
- Lawson Holland (Clemson '76) – Tight ends
- Bob Sanders (Davidson '76) – Assistant defensive coordinator, Defensive Ends
- Jerry Schmidt (Nebraska '86) – Strength and conditioning coordinator
- Steve Spurrier Jr. (Duke '93) – Graduate assistant
- Jimmy Ray Stephens (Florida '77) – Offensive line
- Bob Stoops (Iowa '83) – Assistant head coach, Defensive Coordinator, Secondary
- Barry Wilson (Georgia '65) – Special teams Coordinator, Sam Linebackers

== Team statistics ==
	UF	OPP
Scoring	559	201
Points per game	46.6	16.8
First downs	303	192
Rushing	118	81
Passing	167	87
Penalty	18	24
Total offense	6047	3373
Avg per play	7.1	4.1
Avg per game	503.9	281.1
Fumbles-Lost	16-7	27-14
Penalties-Yards	125-1095	90-748
Avg per game	91.3	62.3

	UF	OPP
Punts-Yards	38-1475	86-3477
Avg per punt	38.8	40.4
Time of possession/Game	28:42	31:18
3rd down conversions	59/145	49/189
4th down conversions	12/19	8/23
Touchdowns scored	76	26
Field goals-Attempts	10-18	7-11
PAT-Attempts	71-75	20-22
Attendance	512424	281107
Games/Avg per game	6/85404	4/70277

=== Scores by quarter ===
	1	2	3	4	Total
Opponents	57	45	66	60	228
Gators	148	220	117	127	612

=== Player statistics ===
==== Offense ====
===== Rushing =====
Name	#	GP	Att	Gain	Loss	Net	Avg	TD	Long	Avg/G
Wiliams, E.	25	12	106	690	19	671	6.3	4	46	55.9
Taylor, F.	21	9	104	650	21	629	6.0	5	30	69.9
Jackson, T.	22	12	79	398	10	388	4.9	8	34	32.3
McCaslin, E.	32	9	41	301	11	290	7.1	4	63	32.2
Baker, T.	20	11	16	80	0	80	5.0	0	18	7.3
Hilliard, I.	19	11	4	33	0	33	8.3	0	13	3.0
Anthony, R.	15	12	4	27	0	27	6.8	0	21	2.3
Green, J.	5	12	6	24	3	21	3.5	1	10	1.8
Mobley, D.	23	12	2	17	0	17	8.5	0	10	1.4
Evans, J.	34	12	2	11	0	11	5.5	0	9	0.9
Dubose, E.	35	12	2	9	0	9	4.5	0	6	0.8
Schottenheimer, B.	16	9	7	10	7	3	0.4	1	3	0.3
Richardson, J.	18	9	1	0	0	0	0.0	0	0	0.0
Johnson, D.	12	7	3	2	12	-10	-3.3	0	1	-1.4
Brindise, N.	17	3	1	0	10	-10	-10.0	0	0	-3.3
Wuerffel, D.	7	12	63	126	226	-100	-1.6	2	18	-8.3
Team Total		12	442	2378	338	2040	4.6	25	63	170.0

==== Passing ====
Name	#	GP	Effic	Atm-Cmp-Int	Pct	Yds	TD	Lng	Avg
Wuerffel, D.	7	12	170.61	360-207-13	57.5	3625	39	85	302.1
Johnson, D.	12	7	99.87	27-12-3	44.4	171	2	27	24.4
Schottenheimer, B.	16	9	155.22	21-13-0	61.9	194	1	34	21.6
Brindise, N.	5	3	114.27	3-2-0	66.7	17	0	15	5.7
Jackson, T.	22	12	0.00	1-0-0	0.0	0	0	0	0.0
Team Total		12	164.37	412-234-16	56.8	4007	42	85	333.9

==== Receiving ====
Name	#	GP	No.	Yds	Avg	TD	Long	Avg/G
Anthony, R.	15	12	72	1293	18.0	18	56	107.8
Hilliard, I.	19	11	47	900	19.1	10	46	81.8
Green, J.	5	12	33	626	19.0	9	85	52.2
Williams, E.	25	12	14	253	18.1	1	45	21.1
McGriff, T.	3	8	14	167	11.9	0	27	20.9
Jackson, T.	22	12	13	163	12.5	1	43	13.6
Taylor, F.	21	9	8	120	15.0	0	38	13.3
Allen, T.	91	12	7	118	16.9	1	32	9.8
Richardson, J.	18	9	5	75	15.0	1	34	8.3
Ross, T.	88	12	4	93	23.3	1	45	7.8
Mobley, D.	23	12	4	51	12.8	0	19	4.3
Karim, N.	8	9	3	47	15.7	0	27	5.2
McCaslin, E.	3	9	3	40	13.3	1	19	4.4
Kinney, E.	83	11	3	40	13.3	0	15	3.6
Dubose, E.	35	12	1	9	9.0	0	9	0.8
Dean, J.	83	5	1	5	5.0	0	5	1.0
Nabavi, D.	84	9	1	5	5.0	1	5	0.6
Schiralli, N.	81	4	1	2	2.0	0	2	0.5
Total		12	234	4007	17.1	42	85	333.9

==== Defense ====
Name	#	GP	Tackles				Sacks	Pass defense				Fumbles		
Name	#	GP	Solo	Ast	Total	TFL-Yds	No-Yds	BrUp	QBH	Int.-Yds	TD	Rcv-Yds	FF	Blkd Kick
Bates, J.	44	11	51	74	125	6.0-23	2.0-14	1	6	1-9				
Rutledge, J.	58	11	40	59	99	12.0-58	5.0-39		5			1-0	4	
Wright, L.	4	11	40	31	71	2.5-15.5	2.5-15.5	3	3			2-12 1TD	1	
Showers, S.	2	11	52	16	68	1.0-1		3		1-0			1	
Peterson, M.	29	9	27	18	45	3.5-10.5	0.5-1.5	2	3					
Lott, A.	9	11	36	8	44	1.0-6	1.0-6	6		2-25		2-26 1TD	1	
Kearse, J.	42	10	27	16	43	8.5-38.5	2.5-11.5	2	4				2	1
Chester, E.	94	10	21	20	41	9.0-35	5.0-28		19			1-0	1	
McGrew, R.	92	11	23	15	38	3.0-4	1.0-2	1	7			1-0		
Weary, F.	24	11	22	10	32			6		5-117	1	1-64 1TD		
Harris, M.	13	9	16	14	30			1						
Moten, M.	90	11	11	16	27	2.0-7	1.0-5		6					
Mitchell, A.	98	10	13	12	25	3.0-14	3.0-14	1	5					
Rodgers, W.	54	10	13	9	22	8.0-33.5	4.0-24.5	1	9			1-0	2	
Jackson, D.	27	11	13	7	20	1.0-1		4	1	1-0		1-0		
Kelsey, K.	41	8	9	10	19	4.0-17	1.0-9		2					
Thomas, D.	52	11	12	7	19									
Beauchamp, T.	93	10	7	11	18	7.0-43	6.0-40		9			1-6	1	
Davis, C.	56	10	6	8	14	9.5-45	5.5-38		7			1-40 1TD	1	
Brown, T.	33	6	7	4	11			3		3-73	1			
Council, K.	66	10	3	6	9	2.0-9	1.0-7	1	3			1-0		
Ferguson, M.	99	8	1	5	6									
George, T.	1	11	5	2	7	1.0-7	1.0-7	1	1	1-2				
Sims, T.	39	2	1	4	5								1	
Owens, D.	30	2	2	1	3			1	1					
Cohens, W.	55	3	2		2	1.0-4	1.0-4	2						
Jackson, T.	22	11	1	1	2									1
McCray, X.	46	11	2		2									
Perry, J.	64	4	2		2									
Walton, K.	50	6		2	2									
Badeaux, E.	96	6	1		1									
Xynidis, J.	26	10	1		1									1
Battle, R.	10	11						1						
Lewis, D.	38	10												
Pollard, D.	28	6										1-0		
Baker, T.	20	9												
Total		11	467	386	853	85-372	43-266	37	93	14-226	2	14-148 4TD	15	3

Defense statistics reflect regular season games only

==== Special teams ====
===== Kicking =====
Name	#	Punting					Kicking	
Name	#	No.	Yds	Avg	Long	Blkd	FG	XP
Cooper, C.	70						1-1	7-9
Edmiston, B.	14						9-17	64-66
Stevenson, R.	87	35	1475	42.1	64	0		
Teague, M.	43							
Total		38	1475	38.8	64	3	10-18	71-75

===== Returns =====
Name	#	Punt returns					Kick returns				
Name	#	No.	Yds	Avg	TD	Long	No.	Yds	Avg	TD	Long
Green, J.	5	25	324	13.0	2	79	10	216	21.6	0	40
Anthony, R.	1	8	90	11.3	0	30	7	113	16.1	0	22
Richardson, J.	18	4	46	11.5	0	20	3	79	26.3	0	28
Hilliard, I.	19	1	10	10.0	0	10	5	144	28.8	0	40
Xynidis, J.	26	1	28	28.0	0	28					
Jackson, T.	22	1	25	25.0	0	25	1	15	15.0	0	15
Lott, A.	9	1	0	0.0	0	0					
Peterson, M.	29	0	9	0.0	1	9					
Dubose, E.	35						2	18	9.0	0	16
Total		41	532	13.0	3	79	28	585	20.9	0	36
