= 1997 Sugar Bowl =

1997 Nokia Sugar Bowl
- Bowl Alliance National Championship Game; 63rd Sugar Bowl
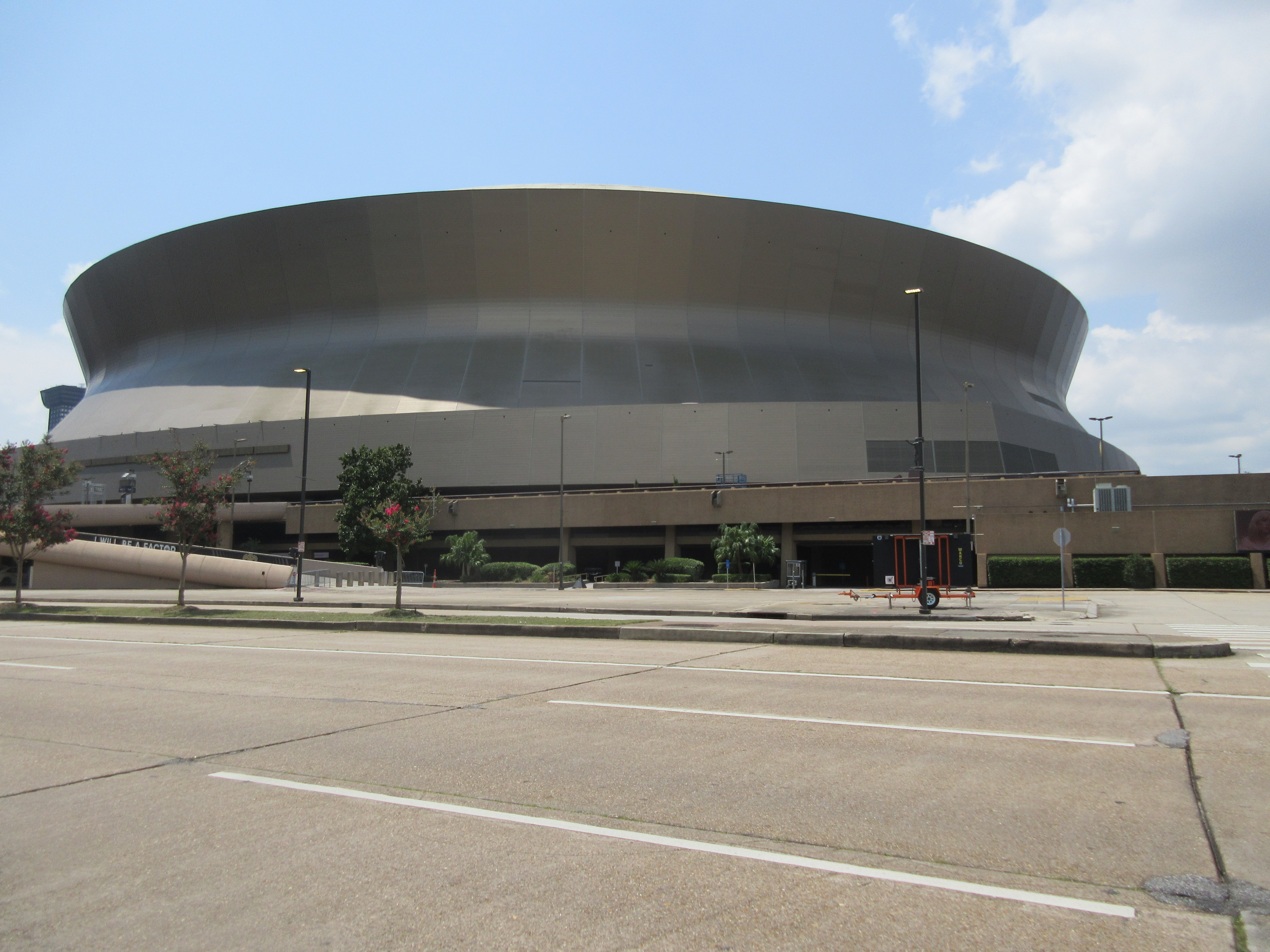
- The Louisiana Superdome in New Orleans, Louisiana, hosted the Sugar Bowl.
Florida Gators	Florida State Seminoles
(11–1)	(11–0)
SEC	ACC
52	20
Head coach: Steve Spurrier	Head coach: Bobby Bowden
AP / Coaches / BA; 3 / 3 / 3	AP / Coaches / BA; 1 / 1 / 1
	1	2	3	4	Total
Florida	10	14	14	14	52
Florida State	3	14	3	0	20
- Date: January 2, 1997
- Season: 1996
- Stadium: Louisiana Superdome
- Location: New Orleans, Louisiana
- MVP: Danny Wuerffel (QB, Florida)
- Favorite: Florida by 3.5 points (54.5)
- Referee: Randy Christal (Big 12)
- Attendance: 78,344

United States TV coverage
- Network: ABC
- Announcers: Keith Jackson (play-by-play); Bob Griese (analyst); Lynn Swann (sideline)

The 1997 Nokia Sugar Bowl was the 63rd edition to the annual Sugar Bowl game and served as the Bowl Alliance's designated national championship game for the 1996 season. It matched No. 1 Florida State of the Atlantic Coast Conference (ACC) against No. 3 Florida of the Southeastern Conference (SEC) in an all-Florida national championship game. Florida defeated Florida State in convincing fashion, with a final score of 52–20, and with the victory earned its first-ever consensus national championship. This remains the only national championship game to feature two teams from the same state.

This was the last time a team won their first national championship until Indiana in 2025.

== Teams ==
The game was a bowl rematch of a regular season game, as Florida State had defeated Florida, 24–21, in a game played in Tallahassee on November 30.

Third-ranked Florida was invited to the designated national championship game because the Pac-10 champion was contractually obligated to play in the Rose Bowl Game, and unavailable to participate in the Bowl Alliance national championship game. As a result, second-ranked Arizona State, the Pac-10 champion, played the Big Ten champion, fourth-ranked Ohio State, in the 1997 Rose Bowl. When Ohio State defeated Arizona State in the Rose Bowl on January 1, the Sugar Bowl winner was all but assured of being named the consensus national champion.

=== Florida Gators ===
The Gators were led by their Heisman Trophy-winning quarterback, Danny Wuerffel. They completed their regular season schedule with a 10–1 record, then defeated No. 11 Alabama in the 1996 SEC Championship Game.

=== Florida State Seminoles ===
Top-ranked Florida State entered the bowl with an undefeated 11–0 record, led by quarterback Thad Busby and running back Warrick Dunn.

== Game summary ==
After a halftime score of 24–17 in favor of Florida, Florida State closed to 24–20 with a third quarter field goal. Florida then outscored Florida State 28–0 for the remainder of the game, for a 52–20 final. Gator quarterback Danny Wuerffel threw three touchdown passes to Ike Hilliard in the game, and ran for another score. Wuerffel became the second Heisman Trophy winner in four years to win a national championship, following Charlie Ward of the 1993 Florida State team.

=== Scoring summary ===
First quarter
Florida: TD Ike Hilliard 9 pass from Danny Wuerffel (Bart Edmiston kick) 9:48

Florida 7–0

FSU: FG Scott Bentley 43 7:49

Florida 7–3

Florida: FG Bart Edmiston 32 2:44

Florida 10–3

Second quarter
Florida: TD Fred Taylor 2 run (Bart Edmiston kick) 11:28

Florida 17–3

FSU: TD E.G. Green 29 pass from Thad Busby (Bentley kick) 7:28

Florida 17–10

Florida: TD Ike Hilliard 31 pass from Danny Wuerffel (Bart Edmiston kick) 5:18

Florida 24–10

FSU: TD Warrick Dunn 12 run (Scott Bentley kick) 0:40

Florida 24–17

Third quarter
FSU: FG Scott Bentley 45 10:24

Florida 24–20

Florida: TD Ike Hilliard 7 pass from Danny Wuerffel (Bart Edmiston kick) 5:43

Florida 31–20

Florida: TD Danny Wuerffel 16 run (Bart Edmiston kick) 0:13

Florida 38–20

Fourth quarter
Florida: TD Terry Jackson 42 run (Bart Edmiston kick) 8:52

Florida 45–20

Florida: TD Terry Jackson 1 run (Bart Edmiston kick) 2:12

Florida 52–20

== See also ==
- Florida–Florida State football rivalry
- List of college football post-season games that were rematches of regular season games
