= 1997 Motor City Bowl =

Ole Miss Rebels	Marshall Thundering Herd
(7–4)	(10–2)
SEC	MAC
34	31
Head coach: Tommy Tuberville	Head coach: Bob Pruett
	1	2	3	4	Total
Ole Miss	7	0	14	13	34
Marshall	10	7	0	14	31
- Date: December 26, 1997
- Season: 1997
- Stadium: Pontiac Silverdome
- Location: Pontiac, Michigan
- MVP: Stewart Patridge QB Ole Miss
- Referee: R.G. Detillier (Big East)
- Attendance: 43,430

United States TV coverage
- Network: ESPN
- Announcers: Jerry Punch and Mike Gottfried

The 1997 Motor City Bowl was the inaugural edition of the new college football bowl game, and was played at the Silverdome in Pontiac, Michigan on December 26, 1997. The game featured the Marshall Thundering Herd of the MAC and the Ole Miss Rebels of the Southeastern Conference.

== Background ==
The Rebels finished third in the SEC Western Division in their first bowl game since 1992. Marshall was champions of the MAC after beating Toledo in the 1997 MAC Championship Game in their first ever season in Division I-A. This was their first bowl game since 1948.

== Game summary ==
In a game with 1,018 yards of total offense, Stewart Patridge threw 29-of-47 passes for 332 yards and 3 touchdowns with 1 interception to lead Ole Miss to victory. Deuce McAllister at running back. Chad Pennington threw 23-of-45 for 337 yards and 3 touchdowns. Randy Moss caught 6 passes for 173 yards.

== Aftermath ==
This was the only Motor City Bowl featuring a team from the SEC. Marshall went to the next three Motor City Bowls. Ole Miss went to two more bowl games in the decade.
