= Ron Powlus =

American football player and coach (born 1974)

No. 10, 11
- Position: Quarterback

Personal information
- Born: July 16, 1974 (age 52); Berwick, Pennsylvania, U.S.
- Listed height: 6 ft 3 in (1.91 m)
- Listed weight: 225 lb (102 kg)

Career information
- High school: Berwick
- College: Notre Dame (1993–1997)
- NFL draft: 1998: undrafted

Career history

Playing
- Tennessee Oilers (1998)*; St. Louis Rams (1998)*; Detroit Lions (1999)*; Amsterdam Admirals (2000); Philadelphia Eagles (2000)
- * Offseason or practice squad member only

Coaching
- Notre Dame (QB) (2005–2009); Akron (QB) (2010–2011); Kansas (QB) (2012–2014)

Ronald Lee Powlus (born July 16, 1974) is an American former professional football player who was a quarterback in NFL Europe. He played college football for the Notre Dame Fighting Irish. After his playing career, he was a quarterbacks coach for the Fighting Irish, Akron Zips, and Kansas Jayhawks.

== Early life ==
Powlus was one of the most heavily touted prospects in the history of high school football as an offensive standout at Berwick High School. In his senior year of 1992, he led the Berwick Bulldogs to a 15–0 record, the Pennsylvania Class AAA title and the USA Today High School Football National Championship. Powlus was honored with several national prep player of the year awards, including Parade Magazine, Gatorade, and USA Today in 1992.

== College career ==
After Powlus signed his letter of intent with Notre Dame in 1992, ESPN analyst Beano Cook famously predicted that Powlus would win the Heisman Trophy at least twice and that he would be the best quarterback in the history of Notre Dame. This was extremely high praise considering that only one player in the history of college football, Archie Griffin, had won the trophy twice.

Succeeding Rick Mirer who had been drafted to the NFL and Kevin McDougal, Powlus was a two-time Irish captain for teams coached by Lou Holtz and Bob Davie who, before the ascent of Brady Quinn in 2005, held 20 school records. He started 42 of 44 regular-season games (Thomas Krug started in place of injured Ron Powlus during the end of the 1995 season plus the 1996 Orange bowl) in which he played for the Irish (plus two bowl games) and finished with 558 career completions on 969 attempts for 7,602 yards and 52 touchdowns. He set the Irish single-game mark for TD passes in a game with four (three times) and at one point completed 14 straight passes. He set single-season marks in 1997 as a senior with his 182 completions and 298 attempts.

Powlus rebounded from a broken collarbone suffered in the preseason of what would have been his freshman season in 1993 and then broke a bone in his upper left arm late in the 1995 season.

Powlus received his undergraduate degree from the Notre Dame College of Business Administration in 1997.

=== College statistics ===
Season	Team	Passing							
Season	Team	Cmp	Att	Pct	Yds	Avg	TD	Int	Rtg
1994	Notre Dame	119	222	53.6	1,729	7.8	19	9	139.2
1995	Notre Dame	124	217	57.1	1,853	8.5	12	7	140.7
1996	Notre Dame	133	232	57.3	1,942	8.4	12	4	141.3
1997	Notre Dame	182	298	61.1	2,078	7.0	9	7	124.9
Career		558	969	57.6	7,602	7.8	52	27	135.6

=== Bowl games ===
- 1995 Fiesta Bowl - Colorado 41, Notre Dame 24
- 1996 Orange Bowl - Florida State 31, Notre Dame 26 (*Powlus did not play in this game after suffering a season-ending arm injury against Navy)
- 1997 Independence Bowl - LSU 27, Notre Dame 9

== Professional career ==
Powlus was signed as an undrafted free agent in 1998 by the Tennessee Oilers of the National Football League but was released before the start of the season. In December 1998, he signed with the St. Louis Rams practice squad before being released. He was on the Detroit Lions' preseason roster in 1999.

In the spring of 2000, he played for the Amsterdam Admirals of NFL Europe during their 10-game season, splitting time with Jim Kubiak at the quarterback position. Powlus finished his pro football career as a backup quarterback on the roster of the 2000 Philadelphia Eagles (NFL) but did not throw a pass during the regular season.

== Coaching and administrative career ==
On March 1, 2005, Powlus returned to Notre Dame as the football team's director of personnel development under head coach Charlie Weis. Following the termination of Peter Vaas' contract, Powlus assumed Vaas' position as the team's quarterbacks coach. After the 2009 season, Weis was fired and nearly the entire Notre Dame staff was let go by new head coach Brian Kelly. After Powlus' departure from Notre Dame he reunited with another former Notre Dame coach, Rob Ianello, as the quarterbacks coach at the University of Akron. After being hired as the head coach of Kansas, Charlie Weis named Powlus his quarterbacks coach. At the end of the 2014 football season, Weis was fired from Kansas. Powlus returned to Notre Dame as Director of Player Development, hired by Brian Kelly. Powlus has remained at Notre Dame and been promoted to Deputy Athletic Director of Football. In 2026, Powlus was named the Chief Operating Officer for Notre Dame football.

== Personal life ==
Powlus spent two years as executive assistant to the Democratic Policy Committee of the Pennsylvania State Senate. He was later employed in the banking and pharmaceutical industries. His son has signed as a quarterback for Notre Dame in the 2021 season.
