= 1997 UCF Golden Knights football team =

American college football season

1997 UCF Golden Knights football
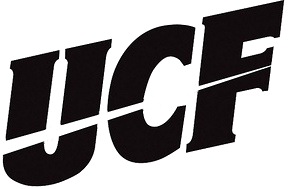
- Conference: Independent
- Record: 5–6
- Head coach: Gene McDowell (13th season)
- Offensive coordinator: Mike Kruczek (13th season)
- Defensive coordinator: Brian VanGorder (1st season)
- Home stadium: Florida Citrus Bowl

1997 NCAA Division I-A independents football records
	Conf.			Overall
Team	W		L	W		L
Louisiana Tech		–		9	–	2
Navy		–		7	–	4
Notre Dame		–		7	–	6
UAB		–		5	–	6
UCF		–		5	–	6
Northeast Louisiana		–		5	–	7
Army		–		4	–	7
Arkansas State		–		2	–	9
Southwestern Louisiana		–		1	–	10
Rankings from AP Poll

The 1997 UCF Golden Knights football season was the nineteenth overall season for the team, and second season as an NCAA Division I-A Independent. It would be the thirteenth and final season for head coach Gene McDowell. McDowell's 1997 team finished with a 5–6 overall record, matching the record from the previous season. McDowell would resign at season's end in the wake of a cell phone fraud scandal. His tenure as head coach came to a close after compiling an 86–61 record. To-date, McDowell still has the most wins as head coach in program history.

UCF started to gain notoriety in 1997, building their program, and playing a higher-profile schedule, including several SEC teams. The Golden Knights lost in overtime to Ole Miss, then narrowly lost to South Carolina. In week three, UCF gained national attention by leading #6 Nebraska 17–14 at halftime. UCF, however, could not hold off the powerful Cornhuskers in the second half, and fell by a final score of 38–24. Lauded by media as the "best 0–3 team in the nation," the Golden Knights won five of their last eight games, including a perfect 4–0 record at home. The team set a then-record average home attendance of 29,585 at the Citrus Bowl, including a then single-game record crowd of 41,827 on September 20. With a 5–6 final record, they were not bowl eligible, but they did attract some attention from scouts for the Carquest Bowl, who saw them as a potential at-large team.

At the conclusion of the season, quarterback Daunte Culpepper set fifteen school records, and was named a finalist for the Davey O'Brien Award. He was also named a semi-finalist for the Football News Offensive Player of the Year. The 1997 season was a break-out year for the junior quarterback, and towards the end of the season, speculation began to swirl if Culpepper would forgo his senior year and enter the 1998 NFL draft. Ultimately, Culpepper elected to return to UCF for one final season.

Hearing impaired tailback Dwight Collins received the Disney's Wide World of Sports Spirit Award, and running backs coach Alan Gooch who worked with him, was named the AFCA Assistant Coach of the Year.

After only two seasons in Division I-A, UCF was already beginning to earn a reputation as a "scary" team on the road. Their near-misses against high-profile teams was in contrast to their predicted status as a mid-major, non-conference school. It started prompting some reluctance among larger schools of scheduling the Knights in future seasons.

== Cell phone fraud scandal ==
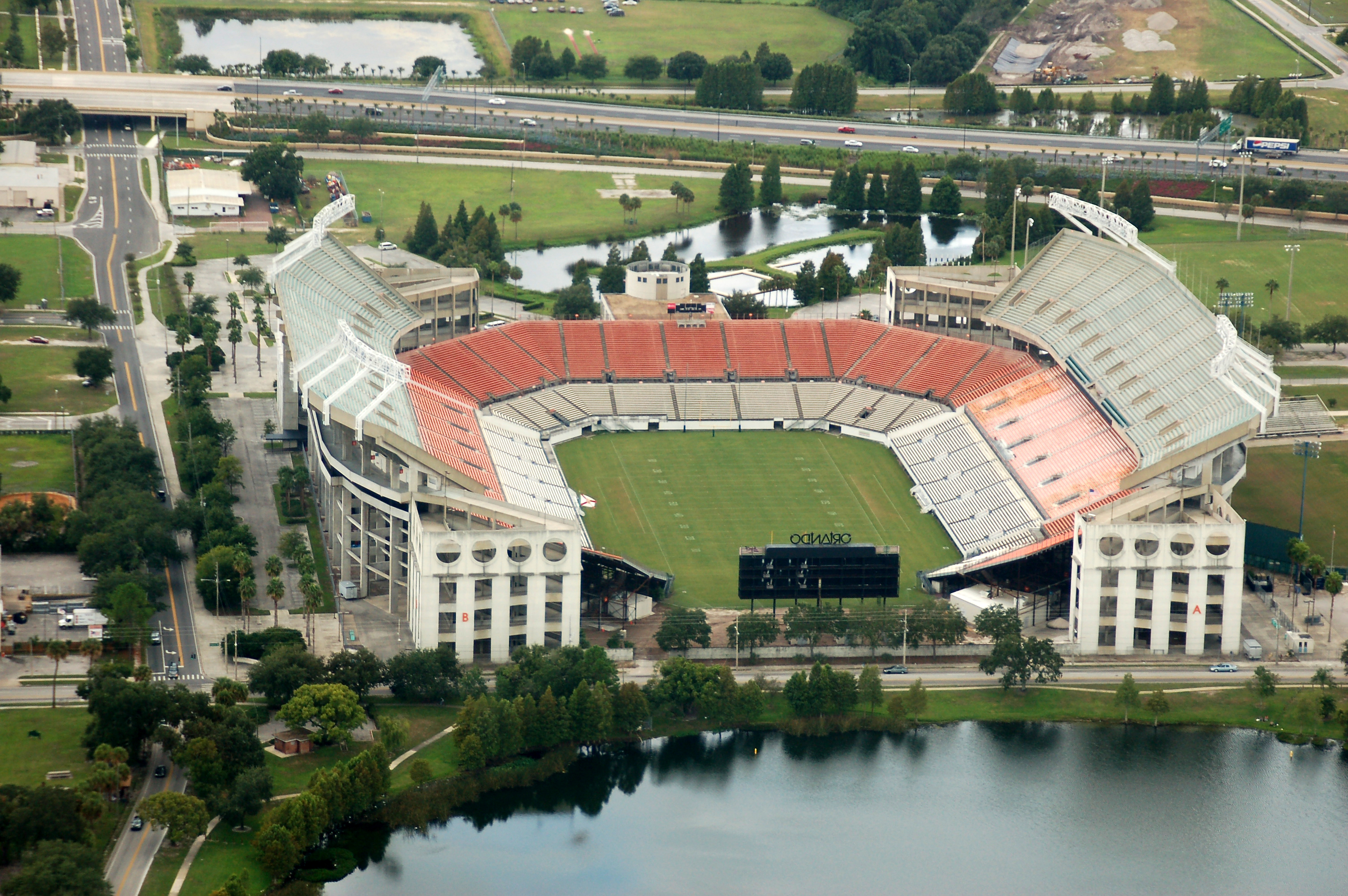
The Florida Citrus Bowl, the Knights' home field

On October 28, 1997, Secret Service agents raided the UCF football team's locker room, as part of a federal cell phone fraud investigation. Former UCF player Patrick Brinson, a former AT&T employee, was arrested for rigging as many as 17 cell phones with non-billing numbers, and subsequently selling them to fellow players. It was later revealed that head coach Gene McDowell had been tipped off on the pending raid by David Smith of the Seminole County Sheriff's Office. McDowell was accused of lying to federal agents and warning the players of the upcoming raid, as well as encouraging players to lie and further engaging in a cover-up. McDowell resigned as head coach on January 20, 1998.

McDowell would eventually be sentenced to house arrest, community service, and two years probation. Two players involved received probation, and three others were sentenced to community service. Brinson, and an accomplice were separately sentenced to probation, restitution, and community service. Smith received probation and a fine.

== Schedule ==
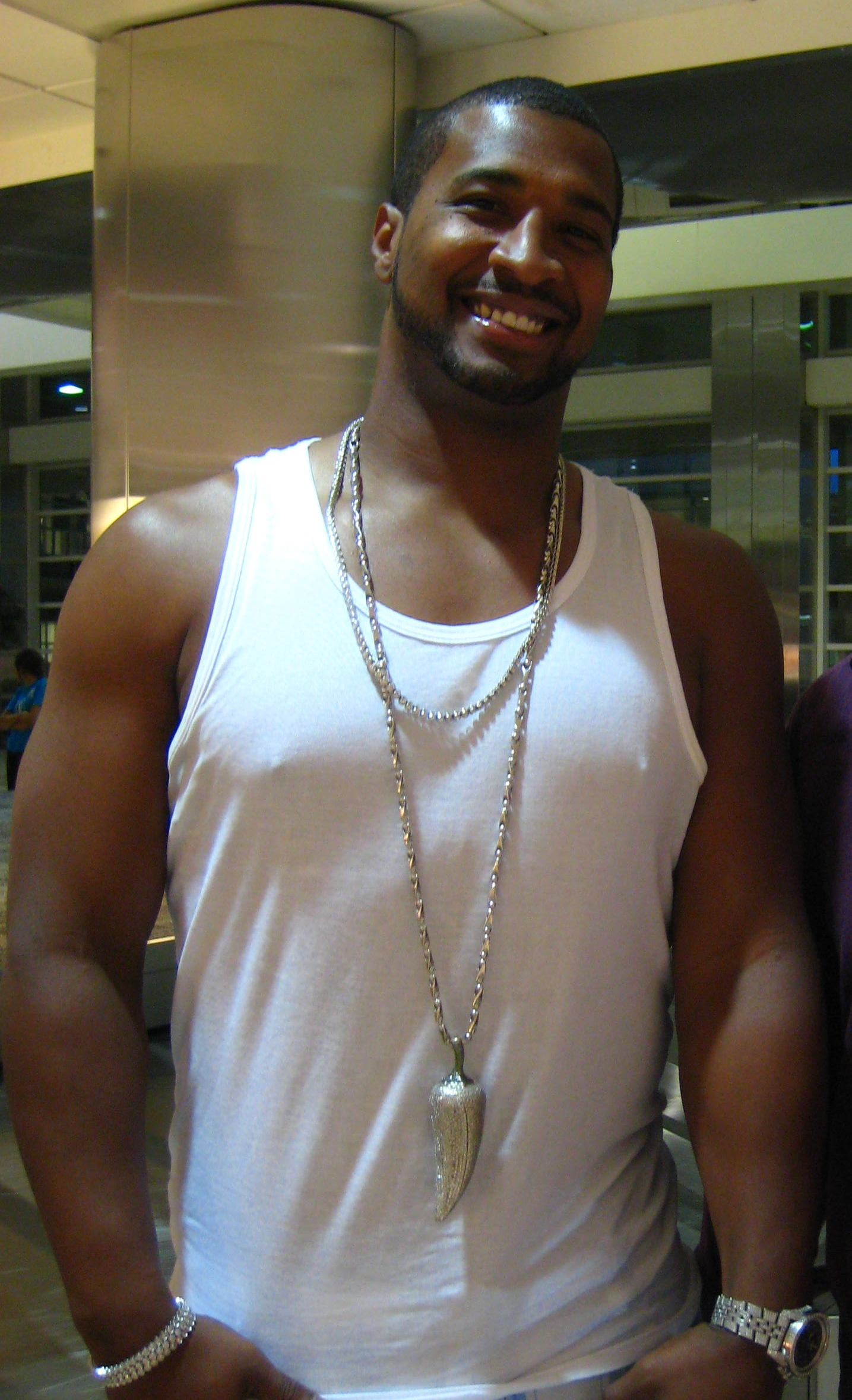
Quarterback Daunte Culpepper set 15 school records in 1997.

Date	Time	Opponent	Site	TV	Result	Attendance
August 30	7:00 pm	at Ole Miss	Vaught–Hemingway Stadium; Oxford, MS		L 23–24 ^{OT}	28,216
September 6	7:00 pm	at South Carolina	Williams–Brice Stadium; Columbia, SC	SUN	L 31–33	81,908
September 13	1:30 pm	at No. 6 Nebraska	Memorial Stadium; Lincoln, NE		L 24–38	75,327
September 20	7:00 pm	Idaho	Florida Citrus Bowl; Orlando, FL		W 41–10	41,827
September 27	7:00 pm	at No. 8 Auburn	Jordan–Hare Stadium; Auburn, AL	PPV	L 14–41	82,109
October 4	2:00 pm	at Kent State	Dix Stadium; Kent, OH		W 59–43	10,584
October 11	4:00 pm	Samford	Florida Citrus Bowl; Orlando, FL		W 52–7	22,016
October 25	2:30 pm	at Mississippi State	Scott Field; Starkville, MS		L 28–35	28,621
November 1	8:00 pm	at Northeast Louisiana	Malone Stadium; Monroe, LA		L 41–45	15,936
November 15	4:00 pm	Eastern Michigan	Florida Citrus Bowl; Orlando, FL		W 27–10	39,433
November 22	12:00 pm	Toledo	Florida Citrus Bowl; Orlando, FL		W 34–17	15,062
Rankings from AP Poll released prior to the game; All times are in Eastern time

== Game summaries ==
=== August 30 – at Ole Miss ===
	1	2	3	4	OT	Total
Golden Knights	7	0	3	7	6	23
Rebels	0	10	7	0	7	24

In only their second season in Division I-A, the Golden Knights nearly pulled off a huge upset at Ole Miss. Quarterback Daunte Culpepper threw two touchdown passes in regulation, and the game went into overtime tied 17–17. Ole Miss got the ball first in the overtime period. Stewart Patridge threw a 19-yard touchdown pass to Rufus French to take a 24–17 lead. UCF took over, and Culpepper completed a 21-yard touchdown pass to Charles Lee. The Golden Knights took a timeout, and contemplated whether to kick the extra point or go for the win. The team elected to try a two-point conversion. Culpepper attempted a quarterback draw, but was stopped just inches short of the goal line. Reaching forward to break the plane of the goal line, the ball came loose and the attempt ultimately failed. UCF lost by the score of 24–23, the first of several near-misses against high-profile schools.

- Source: The Orlando Sentinel

=== September 6 – at South Carolina ===
	1	2	3	4	Total
Golden Knights	7	3	14	7	31
Gamecocks	7	7	6	13	33

For the second time in two weeks, the Golden Knights nearly pulled off an upset of an SEC team. South Carolina took a 14–10 lead into halftime, but UCF exploded into the lead early in the third quarter. Quarterback Daunte Culpepper threw touchdown passes of 71 and 41 yards to Siaha Burley to take a 24–14 lead. The Gamecocks rallied, however, and took a 33–24 lead midway through the fourth quarter. Penalties (17 for 122 yards) and seven sacks haunted the Knights. Darryl Latimore blocked a South Carolina punt - his second punt block of the game - to give UCF good field position, which led to a Mike Huff touchdown with 2:39 remaining. With the score 33–31, UCF attempted an onside kick, but failed, and South Carolina held on to win.

- Source: The Orlando Sentinel

=== September 13 – at Nebraska ===
	1	2	3	4	Total
Golden Knights	7	10	0	7	24
#6 Cornhuskers	0	14	17	7	38

UCF traveled to Nebraska for what would become one of the most memorable games in the program's history. The Golden Knights entered the game as 43 1/2 point underdogs, and were not expected to compete with the powerful Cornhuskers. Led by Hall of Fame head coach Tom Osborne, Nebraska had won two national championships (1994 & 1995) and were contenders once again (they would be voted co-national champions for 1997). Led by starting quarterback Scott Frost (the future UCF head coach), the Cornhuskers were ranked #6 in both polls.

Both teams punted on their first two possessions, with the Golden Knights defense seemingly holding the Cornhuskers at bay. Late in the first quarter, quarterback Daunte Culpepper completed a 44-yard pass to Mark Nonsant to the Nebraska 25 yard line. Four plays later, Culpepper scored on a 10-yard touchdown run for a surprising 7–0 Knights lead. Nebraska tied the score at 7–7 early in the second quarter. But Fred Waczewski kicked a career-best 51-yard field goal to give UCF the lead again at 10–7. At one point in the second quarter, Frost was benched in favor of backup quarterback Frankie London. London completed only one pass, but still drove Nebraska for a touchdown and a 14–10 lead. UCF went three-and-out on their next drive, and was forced to punt. The Nebraska punt returner was tackled and fumbled, and it was recovered by UCF at the Nebraska 45 yard line. Culpepper connected with Mark Nonsant for a 42-yard gain to the 2 yard line. Mike Grant punched it in on the next play for a touchdown and a shocking 17–14 lead. Frost returned to the game, and drove the Cornhuskers into UCF territory. But Kris Brown missed a 27-yard field goal attempt to close out the half.

After a stunning first half by the Golden Knights, Nebraska finally gained control of the game in the third quarter. The Cornhuskers scored 17 unanswered points to take a 31–17 lead into the fourth quarter. A Culpepper interception in the endzone also hurt UCF's chances for a rally. Later, Paul Miranda partially blocked a Nebraska punt, which set up the Golden Knights at the Nebraska 43 yard line. Culpepper drove the Knights for a touchdown, and trimmed the deficit to 31–24. Scott Frost's 5-yard touchdown run with 3:03 remaining sealed the game for the Cornhuskers, and they held on to win 38–24.

After the game, the Memorial Stadium crowd gave the UCF players a standing ovation for their efforts. UCF gained national attention for their performance, and received a single vote in the AP Poll, the first time the school had ever received a vote in either major poll. The team was lauded as the "best 0–3 team in the nation" and the game went down in UCF history as a defining moment for the program. Meanwhile, Nebraska slipped one spot in both polls, but would recover to finish undefeated and claim a share of the national championship.

- Source: The Orlando Sentinel

=== September 20 – Idaho ===
	1	2	3	4	Total
Vandals	7	3	0	0	10
Golden Knights	7	14	3	17	41

A then school record crowd of 41,827 arrived at the Citrus Bowl to watch UCF host Idaho in their home opener. The Golden Knights defense recovered four fumbles and made two interceptions, as UCF won handily by the score of 41–10. Quarterback Daunte Culpepper, however, had a mixed day, throwing for 228 yards and one touchdown, and rushing for a touchdown, but also threw three interceptions. The two teams started off the game committing back-to-back turnovers, and Idaho then drove to the UCF 6 yard line. Vandals quarterback Brian Brennan fumbled on the 1 yard line and it was recovered by UCF, setting the tone for the game. Tailback Mike Grant was the offensive star of the game, rushing for three touchdowns, and had one receiving touchdown. Grant tied a school record with four touchdowns in a single game.

- Source: The Orlando Sentinel

=== September 27 – at Auburn ===
	1	2	3	4	Total
Golden Knights	0	14	0	0	14
#8 Tigers	7	14	13	7	41

No. 8 Auburn defeated UCF by the score of 41–14 in the first meeting between the two teams. The Tigers went up 7–0 in the first quarter. Then Darryl Latimore intercepted Tigers quarterback Dameyune Craig, which led to a UCF touchdown and a 7–7 tie. The Golden Knights defense, however, could not contain Craig most of the day, who threw for 360 yards, and ran for 57 yards. Quarterback Daunte Culpepper managed a 47-yard connection to Todd Cleveland, followed by a 1-yard touchdown pass to Joey Hubbard to make the score 14–14. But Culpepper was unable to keep up with the high-powered Tigers offense. UCF totaled only 45 net yards of rushing. While the Golden Knights were able to keep the game close in the first half, the Tigers pulled away in the second half. The Knights fell to 1–4 on the season.

- Source: The Orlando Sentinel

=== October 4 – at Kent State ===
	1	2	3	4	Total
Golden Knights	7	17	14	21	59
Golden Flashes	7	14	0	22	43

A total of 43 points were scored in the fourth quarter, as UCF outlasted Kent State 59–43 to win their first road game of the season. The Golden Knights and the Golden Flashes combined for 1,227 yards of offense, with Kent State quarterback Jose Davis throwing for a then MAC record of 551 yards and six touchdown passes. UCF quarterback Daunte Culpepper threw for 322 yards, and a then career-high four touchdown passes. He also ran for a 75-yard touchdown. Hearing impaired freshman tailback Dwight Collins had his best game of the season, rushing for 130 yards and two touchdowns, the first 100-yard rusher for UCF since 1995.

Culpepper threw a 1-yard touchdown pass to Kendrick Moore in the first quarter, then Mike Grant scored on a 2-yard run in the second quarter, However, the Golden Knights found themselves trailing 21–14 with under two minutes left in the first half. Grant broke away for a 30-yard gain, which led to a 15-yard touchdown pass from Culpepper to Siaha Burley with 1:50 remaining. Then the Golden Knights got the ball back once more, and Fred Waczewski kicked a 37-yard field goal to make the score 24–21 as time expired in the half.

UCF began to pull away, with two touchdown passes in the third quarter. Culpepper connected to Joey Hubbard and Burley to stretch their lead to 38–21. But the fourth quarter was explosive for both teams. Kent State drove 75 yards in three plays, capped off by a 69-yard touchdown pass from Jose Davis to Jason Gavadza. Culpepper answered, however, with a 75-yard scramble for a touchdown and a 45–29. UCF pinned Kent State back at their own 2 yard line with just over 6 minutes remaining in regulation. Kent State scored on a shocking 98-yard touchdown reception by Eugene Baker, and cut the lead to 45–35. Not to be denied, Dwight Collins iced the game for the Golden Knights with two touchdown runs (40 yards and 14 yards, respectively) in the final minutes.

- Source: The Orlando Sentinel

=== October 11 – Samford ===
	1	2	3	4	Total
Bulldogs	7	0	0	0	7
Golden Knights	17	7	21	7	52

UCF quarterback Daunte Culpepper started the game 15-for-15 passing, throwing for 252 yards and two touchdowns in the first half alone, as the Golden Knights routed Samford. Culpepper finished with 309 yards and three touchdown passes, and was rested in the fourth quarter of a 52–7 victory.

Mike Grant ran for three touchdowns, as UCF racked up 181 yards rushing. The Golden Knights quickly jumped out to a 17–0 lead in the first quarter, and were never challenged for the lead. Samford's only score came late in the second quarter. Despite a somewhat lethargic second quarter, which resulted in three punts, and where Culpepper lost a fumble when he collided with an official, the UCF offense rebounded in the second half. After Culpepper was benched, backup quarterback Jason Thorpe added a 31-yard touchdown pass to Eric Leister partway through the fourth quarter.

- Source: The Orlando Sentinel

=== October 25 – at Mississippi State ===
	1	2	3	4	Total
Golden Knights	7	7	6	8	28
Bulldogs	7	7	7	14	35

After a bye week, UCF traveled to Starkville to face Mississippi State. In yet another near-miss against an SEC team, the Golden Knights, led with under 7 minutes to go, before giving up two late touchdowns. UCF quarterback Daunte Culpepper threw for 359 yards, two touchdown passes, and rushed for 61 yards. Three interceptions, however, foiled the team's chances. The Golden Knights out-gained the Bulldogs in yardage 486 to 318, first downs (29 to 13), and had a time of possession advantage of more than 8 minutes. J. J. Johnson's four touchdown runs, though, was the deciding factor.

Robert Isaac returned the opening kickoff 84 yards, setting up the Bulldogs first touchdown a minute into the game. UCF soon tied the score at 7–7 with a 2-yard touchdown run by Mike Grant. Culpepper's first interception of the game came in the second quarter, snapping a school-record streak of 117 pass attempts without an interception. The game went into halftime with the score was tied 14–14. In the third quarter, the Bulldogs again capitalized on sluggish kick return coverage. Another long return by Isaac set up a 42-yard touchdown pass by Matt Wyatt to Lamonte Woodberry. Two field goals by UCF kicker Fred Waczewski made the score 21–20 in favor of Mississippi State.

Trailing by 1 point, Culpepper drove the Golden Knights 80 yards in 9 plays, capping off the drive with a 17-yard touchdown pass to Charles Lee. Culpepper's two-point conversion pass to Siaha Burley put the Golden Knights up by 7 points. With under nine minutes left in regulation, the cowbell-wielding homecoming crowd was stunned and quieted as UCF now led 28–21. Anxious at another chance for a program-defining victory, fatigue began to set in for UCF on both offense and defense. Wyatt connected to Reggie Kelly for 36 yards, then a 1-yard touchdown run by Johnson tied the game. On the next drive, a blitzing defense forced UCF into a 3-and-out. Two plays later, Johnson scored the go-ahead touchdown for Mississippi State with 5:13 left. Driving to tie the game, a Culpepper pass was tipped and intercepted. UCF had one last drive, however, Culpepper was intercepted with 43 seconds to go, sealing the game for the Bulldogs.

- Source: The Orlando Sentinel
- Source: The Clarion-Ledger

=== November 1 – at Northeast Louisiana ===
	1	2	3	4	Total
Golden Knights	14	6	8	13	41
Indians	0	21	7	17	45

Just days after a cell phone fraud scandal broke at the team headquarters, UCF traveled to Monroe for their final road game of the season. Quarterback Daunte Culpepper scored six touchdowns (five passing, one rushing), and had 480 yards of offense, but the Golden Knights could not outlast the Indians. They fell by the score of 45–41, erasing hopes for a winning season.

Culpepper threw two touchdown passes to jump out to a 14–0 lead in the first quarter. The Indians, bounced back in the second quarter, scoring three touchdowns, while blocking a UCF extra point, to take a 21–20 lead into halftime. Culpepper's career-long 44-yard touchdown run in the third quarter, followed by a two-point conversion pass from tailback Mike Grant to Rufus Hall, made the score 28–28. The touchdown run followed a Knights interception, and a 17-yard pass completion to Hall.

The back-and-forth game continued into the fourth quarter, with touchdowns by both teams and a 35–35 tie with 9:45 remaining. The Indians executed a fake punt, which kept their drive alive, capping off by a 1-yard touchdown run by Alan Ricard. Later, Travis Singleton intercepted Culpepper, leading to an Indians field goal, and the Golden Knights trailed 38–35 with under five minutes to go. Culpepper took over on the next drive, and in five plays re-took the lead. He connected to wide receiver Charles Lee, who broke free for a 61-yard go-ahead touchdown with 2:45 left in regulation. The UCF defense, however, could not seal the game. The Indians drove 82 yards in the final two and a half minutes, scoring the game-winning touchdown with 33 seconds to go.

- Source: The Orlando Sentinel

=== November 15 – Eastern Michigan ===
	1	2	3	4	Total
Eagles	0	3	7	0	10
Golden Knights	0	10	7	10	27

After a week off, a homecoming crowd of 39,433 arrived to cheer the Golden Knights, as they defeated the potent offense of the Eastern Michigan Eagles led by quarterback Charlie Batch. UCF quarterback Daunte Culpepper threw for 243 yards, and rushed for 79 yards. Tailback Mike Grant rushed for 83 yards with two touchdowns, while Siaha Burley caught eight passes for 135 yards. On two occasions Eric Leister, a utility player, executed tricks plays for the Golden Knights. In the first quarter, Leister took a reverse from Culpepper, then connected downfield to Burley for a 40-yard gain. In the third quarter, a fake field goal attempt saw Leister as the holder, tossing a 4-yard pass to fullback Joe Field, which gave UCF a first down. The play led to a touchdown few plays later.

Despite issues on defense in previous weeks, the Golden Knights defense stepped up much of the game. Miscues by the Eagles were noted, as in the second quarter, trailing by 7 points inside the UCF 1 yard line, time was running out in the half. Batch failed to get a play off before halftime, and just inches short of the goal line, Eastern Michigan's drive came up empty. With UCF leading 21–10 with six minutes remaining, Eastern Michigan faced a 4th & 3 at the UCF 44 yard line. Mike Osuna sacked Charlie Batch for a turnover on downs, and UCF was able to secure the win.

- Source: The Orlando Sentinel

=== November 22 – Toledo ===
	1	2	3	4	Total
Rockets	3	0	7	7	17
Golden Knights	10	10	7	7	34

UCF's final game of the season came against Toledo. The Rockets were 9–1 coming into the game, and had clinched the MAC west division crown. The game would be an opportunity for the Golden Knights to beat a team that had been ranked as high as 18th in the Top 25, as well as finish undefeated at home on senior day. The Golden Knights even came into the game as 6-point favorites. The game was played as a doubleheader at the Citrus Bowl along with the Florida Classic. Much of the pregame hype focused on quarterback Daunte Culpepper and whether or not this would be his final game at UCF. Rumors had been swirling over the past few weeks that Culpepper might forgo his senior season and enter the 1998 NFL draft. Culpepper was largely silent on the issue, and stated he would announce his intentions after the game.

Quarterback Daunte Culpepper threw for 209 yards and one touchdown pass, and ran for one touchdown, but it was an explosive play on special teams that set the tone for the game. The teams traded field goals in the first quarter for a 3–3 tie. With about five minutes left in the first quarter, Toledo kicked off and UCF returner Todd Cleveland caught the ball at the 7 yard line. The Knights executed a reverse, and Cleveland handed off to Paul Miranda at the 12, who then broke free for an 88-yard touchdown. Fred Waczewski added another field goal, and the Golden Knights led 13–3. In the final minute of the second quarter, Culpepper capped off a 9-play, 81-yard drive with a 1-yard run. UCF led 20–3 at halftime.

The Rockets cut into the lead in the second half. With the score 27–10 in favor of UCF, Toledo drove 73 yards for a touchdown, a 6-yard pass from Chris Wallace to Mel Long. With 13:43 left in regulation, UCF's lead was down to 27–17. With the UCF offense stalling, Toledo got the ball back and drove into Knights territory with under 7 minutes to go. The Rockets got to the red zone, but the defense stiffened and they had to settle for a 34-yard field goal attempt. The kick sailed wide right, and UCF held their lead. The Knights offense put the game out of reach with a clock-burning 11-play, 80-yard drive culminating in a 4-yard touchdown run by senior fullback Kendrick Moore. In his final game as a Knight, it was Moore's first and only rushing touchdown.

On Monday after the game, Daunte Culpepper announced he would return for his senior season in 1998.

- Source: The Orlando Sentinel
