= 1997 Marshall Thundering Herd football team =

American college football season

1997 Marshall Thundering Herd football

MAC champion MAC East Division champion

MAC Championship Game, W 34–14 vs. Toledo

Motor City Bowl, L 31–34 vs. Ole Miss
- Conference: Mid-American Conference
- East Division
- Record: 10–3 (7–1 MAC)
- Head coach: Bob Pruett (2nd season)
- Co-offensive coordinators: Gunter Brewer (2nd season); Tim Nunez (1st season)
- Offensive scheme: Spread
- Defensive coordinator: Kevin Kelly (2nd season)
- Base defense: 3–4
- Captains: John Wade; Brian Reed; Chad Pennington; Thomas Maxwell; B. J. Cohen; Larry McCloud
- Home stadium: Marshall University Stadium

Uniform
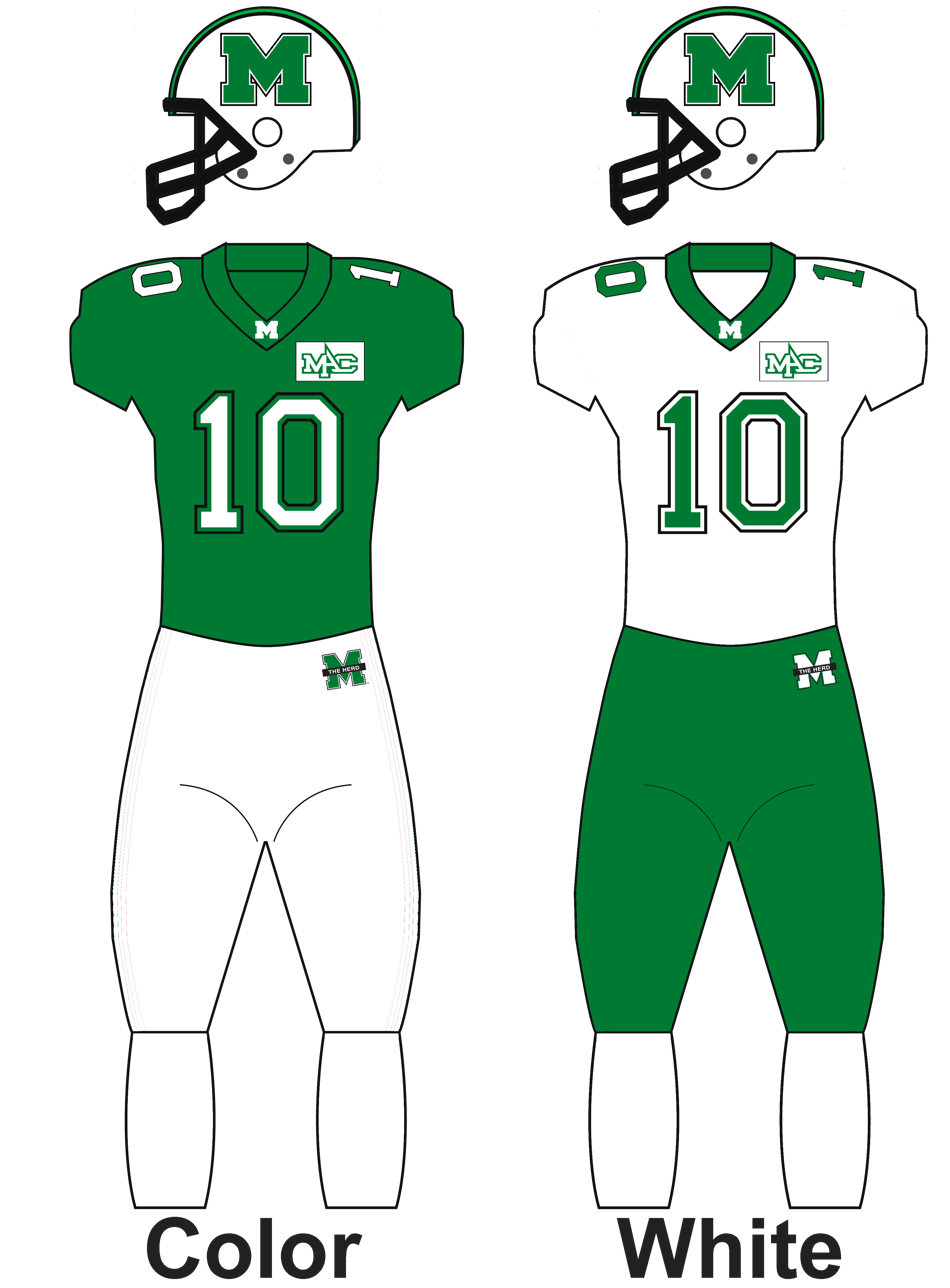

1997 Mid-American Conference football standings
	Conf.			Overall
Team	W		L	W		L
East Division
Marshall x$	7	–	1	10	–	3
Miami (OH)	6	–	2	8	–	3
Ohio	6	–	2	8	–	3
Bowling Green	3	–	5	3	–	8
Kent State	3	–	5	3	–	8
Akron	2	–	7	2	–	9
West Division
Toledo x	7	–	1	9	–	3
Western Michigan	6	–	2	8	–	3
Ball State	4	–	4	5	–	6
Eastern Michigan	4	–	5	4	–	7
Central Michigan	1	–	7	2	–	9
Northern Illinois	0	–	8	0	–	11
Championship: Marshall 34, Toledo 14
$ – Conference champion; x – Division champion/co-champions

The 1997 Marshall Thundering Herd football team represented Marshall University as a member of the East Division of the Mid-American Conference (MAC) during the 1997 NCAA Division I-A football season. Led by second-year head coach Bob Pruett, the Thundering Herd compiled an overall record of 10–3 with a mark of 7–1 in conference play, winning the MAC's East Division title. Marshall beat Toledo in MAC Championship Game to win the conference championship and then lost to Ole Miss in the Motor City Bowl.

After winning the Southern Conference (SoCon) tile and the NCAA Division I-AA Football Championship in 1996, Marshall returned to NCAA Division I-A play for the first time since 1981 and the MAC for the time since 1968. The Thundering Herd played home games at Marshall University Stadium in Huntington, West Virginia.

Wide receiver Randy Moss and quarterback Chad Pennington were the centerpiece of an explosive offense. Moss caught 26 touchdown passes, at the time an NCAA Division I-A record, and was a unanimous first-team All-American. For the season, Moss had 96 receptions for 1,820 yards, won the Fred Biletnikoff Award as the nation's best wide receiver, and was a finalist for the Heisman Trophy, finishing fourth in the balloting, behind Ryan Leaf, Peyton Manning, and Charles Woodson, who won the award. Moss left Marshall with 168 receptions for 3,467 yards and a school record 53 touchdowns in two seasons.

The Herd became only the second team to win a conference championship in its first NCAA Division I-A (now FBS) season, following the 1992 Nevada Wolf Pack football team that won the Big West Conference. The feat was not repeated until 2014, when Georgia Southern won the Sun Belt Conference title.

== Schedule ==
Date	Time	Opponent	Site	TV	Result	Attendance	Source
August 30	12:00 pm	at West Virginia*	Mountaineer Field; Morgantown, WV (Friends of Coal Bowl)	ESPN Plus	L 31–42	65,492	
September 6	1:00 pm	at Army*	Michie Stadium; West Point, NY		W 35–25	30,358	
September 13	3:30 pm	at Kent State	Dix Stadium; Kent, OH		W 42–17	11,021	
September 20	7:00 pm	Western Illinois*	Marshall University Stadium; Huntington, WV	WSAZ	W 48–7	26,724	
September 27	1:00 pm	at Ball State	Ball State Stadium; Muncie, IN	WVAH	W 42–16	20,415	
October 11	7:00 pm	Akron	Marshall University Stadium; Huntington, WV		W 52–17	26,642	
October 18	2:00 pm	at Miami (OH)	Yager Stadium; Oxford, OH	WSAZ	L 21–45	29,027	
October 25	7:00 pm	Eastern Michigan	Marshall University Stadium; Huntington, WV		W 48–25	21,474	
November 1	1:00 pm	at Central Michigan	Kelly/Shorts Stadium; Mount Pleasant, MI	WSAZ	W 45–17	15,324	
November 8	3:30 pm	Bowling Green^{†}	Marshall University Stadium; Huntington, WV	WSAZ	W 28–0	23,509	
November 15	3:30 pm	Ohio	Marshall University Stadium; Huntington, WV (Battle for the Bell)		W 27–0	32,012	
December 5	7:30 pm	Toledo	Marshall University Stadium; Huntington, WV (MAC Championship Game)	ESPN2	W 34–14	28,021	
December 26	8:00 pm	vs. Ole Miss*	Pontiac Silverdome; Pontiac, MI (Motor City Bowl)	ESPN	L 31–34	43,340	
*Non-conference game; ^{†}Homecoming; All times are in Eastern time

== Game summaries ==
=== At West Virginia ===
Team	1	2	3	4	Total
Thundering Herd	3	7	21	0	31
• Mountaineers	21	7	0	14	42

- Date: August 30
- Location:
  Mountaineer Field
  Morgantown, WV
- Game start: 12:00 p.m. EDT
- Game attendance: 65,492
- Game weather: 70 °F (21 °C), Partly Cloudy and Mild, Wind NW 4 mph (6.4 km/h)
- Referee: Jim Maconaghy
- TV announcers (ESPN+): John Sanders and Jeff Bostic

Scoring summary
1	12:30	WVU	Gary Thompkins 7-yard blocked punt return (Jay Taylor kick)	WVU 7–0
1	6:04	WVU	Amos Zereoué 10-yard run (Jay Taylor kick)	WVU 14–0
1	2:24	MAR	Billy Malashevich 25-yard field goal	WVU 14–3
1	0:02	WVU	Amos Zereoué 52-yard run (Jay Taylor kick)	WVU 21–3
2	10:51	WVU	Curtis Keaton 11-yard run (Jay Taylor kick)	WVU 28–3
2	3:34	MAR	LaVorn Colclough 24-yard pass from Chad Pennington (Billy Malashevich kick)	WVU 28–10
3	13:08	MAR	Randy Moss 15-yard pass from Chad Pennington (Billy Malashevich kick)	WVU 28–17
3	9:24	MAR	Llow Turner 53-yard run (Billy Malashevich kick)	WVU 28–24
3	0:35	MAR	Randy Moss 25-yard pass from Chad Pennington (Billy Malashevich kick)	MAR 31–28
4	11:07	WVU	Chad Wable 15-yard pass from Marc Bulger (Jay Taylor kick)	WVU 35–31
4	7:56	WVU	Amos Zereoué 1-yard run (Jay Taylor kick)	WVU 42–31

After trailing 28–3, the Thundering Herd scored 28 straight to take a 31–28 lead into the 4th quarter. West Virginia responded with two fourth quarter touchdowns to win this much anticipated season opener, 42–31. Randy Moss had seven receptions for 85 yards and two touchdowns.

=== At Army ===
Team	1	2	3	4	Total
• Thundering Herd	7	7	14	7	35
Cadets	0	12	6	7	25

- Date: September 6
- Location:
  Michie Stadium
  West Point, NY
- Game start: 1:00 p.m. EDT
- Game attendance: 30,358

Scoring summary
1	8:09	MAR	Randy Moss 90-yard pass from Chad Pennington (Billy Malashevich kick)	MAR 7–0
2	14:22	MAR	LaVorn Coclough 36-yard pass from Chad Pennington (Billy Malashevich kick)	MAR 14–0
2	8:24	ARMY	Joe Hewitt 7-yard run (kick failed)	MAR 14–6
2	0:18	ARMY	Ty Amey 2-yard run (conversion failed)	MAR 14–12
3	14:41	MAR	Randy Moss 79-yard pass from Chad Pennington (Billy Malashevich kick)	MAR 21–12
3	10:37	MAR	Ricky Hall 43-yard fumble return (Billy Malashevich kick)	MAR 28–12
3	4:23	ARMY	Ty Amey 1-yard run (conversion failed)	MAR 28–19
4	11:07	MAR	Javonne Darling 3-yard run (Billy Malashevich kick)	MAR 35–19
4	4:23	ARMY	Johnny Goff 7-yard run (Eric Olsen kick)	MAR 35–25

Randy Moss had five receptions for 186 yards and two touchdowns, highlighted by a 90-yard touchdown midway through the first quarter.

=== At Kent State ===
Team	1	2	3	4	Total
• Thundering Herd	14	7	14	7	42
Golden Flashes	0	10	0	7	17

- Date: September 13
- Location:
  Dix Stadium
  Kent, OH
- Game start: 3:30 p.m. EDT
- Game attendance: 11,021

Randy Moss hauled in 8 receptions for 216 yards and 3 touchdowns.

=== Western Illinois ===
Team	1	2	3	4	Total
Leathernecks	0	0	7	0	7
• Thundering Herd	14	0	20	14	48

- Date: September 20
- Location:
  Marshall Stadium
  Huntington, WV
- Game start: 7:00 p.m. EDT
- Game attendance: 26,724

Randy Moss had 5 receptions for 52 yards and 2 touchdowns.

=== At Ball State ===
Team	1	2	3	4	Total
• Thundering Herd	14	10	14	7	45
Cardinals	3	13	0	0	16

- Date: September 27
- Location:
  Ball State Stadium
  Muncie, IN
- Game start: 1:00 p.m. EDT
- Game attendance: 20,415

Randy Moss caught 13 passes for 205 yards and a school-record 5 touchdowns.

=== Akron ===
Team	1	2	3	4	Total
Zips	7	7	3	0	17
• Thundering Herd	28	10	0	14	52

- Date: October 11
- Location:
  Marshall Stadium
  Huntington, WV
- Game start: 7:00 p.m. EDT
- Game attendance: 26,642

Randy Moss had 6 receptions for 107 yards and 2 touchdowns.

=== At Miami (OH) ===
Team	1	2	3	4	Total
Thundering Herd	7	14	0	0	21
• RedHawks	7	7	7	24	45

- Date: October 18
- Location:
  Yager Stadium
  Oxford, OH
- Game start: 2:00 p.m. EDT
- Game attendance: 29,027

Randy Moss had 10 receptions for 147 yards and a touchdown.

=== Eastern Michigan ===
Team	1	2	3	4	Total
Eagles	3	7	15	0	25
• Thundering Herd	14	7	13	14	48

- Date: October 25
- Location:
  Marshall Stadium
  Huntington, WV
- Game start: 7:00 p.m. EDT
- Game attendance: 21,474

Randy Moss had 8 receptions for 124 yards and a touchdown.

=== At Central Michigan ===
Team	1	2	3	4	Total
• Thundering Herd	20	6	12	7	45
Chippewas	7	3	0	7	17

- Date: November 1
- Location:
  Mount Pleasant, MI
- Game start: 1:00 p.m. EST
- Game attendance: 15,324

Randy Moss had 7 receptions for 193 yards and 2 touchdowns.

=== Bowling Green ===
Team	1	2	3	4	Total
Falcons	0	0	0	0	0
• Thundering Herd	14	7	7	0	28

- Date: November 8
- Location:
  Marshall Stadium
  Huntington, WV
- Game start: 3:30 p.m. EST
- Game attendance: 23,509

Randy Moss had 7 receptions for 56 yards and a touchdown.

=== Ohio ===
Team	1	2	3	4	Total
Bobcats	0	0	0	0	0
• Thundering Herd	7	7	0	13	27

- Date: November 15
- Location:
  Marshall Stadium
  Huntington, WV
- Game start: 3:30 p.m. EST
- Game attendance: 32,012

Randy Moss had seven receptions for 101 yards and a touchdown.

=== Toledo (MAC Championship game) ===
Team	1	2	3	4	Total
Rockets	0	7	0	7	14
• Thundering Herd	3	0	14	17	34

- Date: December 5
- Location:
  Marshall Stadium
  Huntington, WV
- Game start: 7:30 p.m. EST
- Game attendance: 28,021
- Game weather: Snow
- Television network: ESPN2

Scoring summary
1	10:51	Marshall	Billy Malashevich 22-yard field goal	Marshall 3–0
2	13:16	Toledo	Ray Curry 56-yard pass from Chris Wallace (Chris Merrick kick)	Toledo 7–3
3	6:46	Marshall	Randy Moss 4-yard pass from Chad Pennington (Malashevich kick)	Marshall 10–7
3	3:48	Marshall	Randy Moss 86-yard pass from Chad Pennington (Malashevich kick)	Marshall 17–7
4	10:42	Marshall	Billy Malashevich 25-yard field goal	Marshall 20–7
4	7:01	Marshall	Randy Moss 20-yard pass from Chad Pennington (Malashevich kick)	Marshall 27–7
4	6:24	Marshall	Doug Chapman 5-yard run (Malashevich kick)	Marshall 34–7
4	3:02	Toledo	Mel Long 33-yard pass from Chris Wallace (Merrick kick)	Marshall 34–14

Randy Moss had seven receptions for 170 yards and three touchdowns.

=== Vs. Ole Miss (Motor City Bowl) ===
Team	1	2	3	4	Total
• Rebels	7	0	14	13	34
Thundering Herd	10	7	0	14	31

- Date: December 26
- Location:
  Pontiac Silverdome
  Pontiac, MI
- Game attendance: 43,430
- Game weather: Indoors
- TV announcers (ESPN): Jerry Punch and Mike Gottfried

Scoring summary
1	14:36	MISS	John Avery 1-yard run (Lindsey kick)	MISS 7–0
1	14:19	MAR	Randy Moss 80-yard pass from Chad Pennington (Billy Malashevich kick)	Tied 7–7
1	0:22	MAR	Billy Malashevich 36-yard field goal	MAR 10–7
2	9:04	MAR	LaVorn Colclough 19-yard pass from Chad Pennington (Bill Malashevich kick)	MAR 17–7
3	11:46	MISS	Andre Rone 13-yard pass from Stewart Patridge (Lindsey kick)	MAR 17–14
3	6:00	MISS	Deuce McAllister 20-yard pass from Stewart Patridge (Lindsey kick)	MISS 21–17
4	10:12	MAR	Doug Chapman 6-yard pass from Chad Pennington (Billy Malashevich kick)	MAR 24–21
4	5:39	MISS	Grant Heard 19-yard pass from Stewart Patridge (kick failed)	MISS 27–24
4	2:57	MAR	Doug Chapman 9-yard run (Billy Malashevich kick)	MAR 31–27
4	0:31	MISS	Deuce McAllister 1-yard run (Lindsey kick)	MISS 34–31

Playing in its first bowl game since the 1948 Tangerine Bowl, Marshall lost a back-and-forth matchup with Ole Miss. Randy Moss had 6 receptions for 173 yards and a touchdown, including an 80-yard bomb from Chad Pennington, in his final collegiate game.

== Roster ==
1997 Marshall Thundering Herd football team roster
Players
Coaches
Offense

Pos.	#	Name	Class
RB	22	Doug Chapman	So
WR	18	LaVorn Colclough	Jr
OT	63	Mike Guilliams	So
WR	88	Randy Moss	So
WR	85	Matthew Harris	So
QB	10	Chad Pennington	So
G	52	Brian Reed	Sr
OT	78	Jamie Rodgers
G	65	Burt Scarbrough	Jr
C	62	Jason Starkey	So
RB	32	Llow Turner	So
C	66	John Wade	Sr
TE	87	John White	Jr
WR	2	Mark Wicks	Sr

Defense

Pos.	#	Name	Class
FS	42	Rogers Beckett	So
DE	5	B. J. Cohen	Sr
LB	4	John Grace	So
DL	6	Ricky Hall	Jr
ROV	9	Thomas Maxwell	Sr
LB	28	Larry McCloud	Sr
CB	11	Larry Moore	Sr
LB	55	Andre O'Neal	So
CB	8	B. J. Summers	Sr
DE	58	Paul Totten	Jr
DT	97	Joe Zeglowitsch	Jr

Special teams

Pos.	#	Name	Class
P	41	Chris Hanson	Jr
K	43	J. R. Jenkins	Fr
K	49	Billy Malashevich	So

Head coach

- Bob Pruett

Coordinators/assistant coaches

Legend

- (C) Team captain
- (S) Suspended
- (I) Ineligible
- Injured
- Redshirt

== Awards and honors ==
- Randy Moss – Fred Biletnikoff Award, Heisman Trophy Finalist (4th in Voting), Unanimous First-Team All-American, MAC Offensive Player of the Year

== Team players in the 1998 NFL draft ==
Player	Position	Round	Pick	Team
Randy Moss	Wide receiver	1	21	Minnesota Vikings
John Wade	Center	5	148	Jacksonville Jaguars
