= 1997 Southwestern Louisiana Ragin' Cajuns football team =

American college football season

1997 Southwestern Louisiana Ragin' Cajuns football
- Conference: Independent
- Record: 1–10
- Head coach: Nelson Stokley (12th season)
- Offensive coordinator: Doug Fertsch (2nd season)
- Home stadium: Cajun Field

1997 NCAA Division I-A independents football records
	Conf.			Overall
Team	W		L	W		L
Louisiana Tech		–		9	–	2
Navy		–		7	–	4
Notre Dame		–		7	–	6
UAB		–		5	–	6
UCF		–		5	–	6
Northeast Louisiana		–		5	–	7
Army		–		4	–	7
Arkansas State		–		2	–	9
Southwestern Louisiana		–		1	–	10
Rankings from AP Poll

The 1997 Southwestern Louisiana Ragin' Cajuns football team was an American football team that represented the University of Southwestern Louisiana (now known as the University of Louisiana at Lafayette) as an independent during the 1997 NCAA Division I-A football season. In their 12th year under head coach Nelson Stokley, the Ragin' Cajuns compiled a 1–10 record.

== Schedule ==
Date	Opponent	Site	Result	Attendance	Source
August 30	at Pittsburgh	Pitt Stadium; Pittsburgh, PA	L 13–45	34,802	
September 6	Oklahoma State	Cajun Field; Lafayette, LA	L 7–31	16,724	
September 13	at Texas Tech	Jones Stadium; Lubbock, TX	L 14–59	35,953	
September 20	at Texas A&M	Kyle Field; College Station, TX	L 0–66	61,081	
September 27	UAB	Cajun Field; Lafayette, LA	L 7–42	15,024	
October 4	at Arkansas State	Indian Stadium; Jonesboro, AR	W 41–38		
October 11	North Alabama	Cajun Field; Lafayette, LA	L 42–48 ^{4OT}		
October 25	Northeast Louisiana	Cajun Field; Lafayette, LA (Battle on the Bayou)	L 21–28 ^{OT}	14,124	
November 1	Tulane	Cajun Field; Lafayette, LA	L 0–56	17,724	
November 8	at No. 16 Washington State	Martin Stadium; Pullman, WA	L 7–77	32,345	
November 15	Louisiana Tech	Cajun Field; Lafayette, LA (rivalry)	L 24–63	10,083	
Rankings from AP Poll released prior to the game
