= Rondell Mealey =

American football player (born 1977)

No. 32
- Position: Running back

Personal information
- Born: February 24, 1977 (age 49); New Orleans, Louisiana, U.S.
- Listed height: 6 ft 0 in (1.83 m)
- Listed weight: 224 lb (102 kg)

Career information
- High school: Destrehan (Destrehan, Louisiana)
- College: LSU
- NFL draft: 2000: 7th round, 252nd overall pick

Career history
- Green Bay Packers (2000–2002)

Awards and highlights
- Freshman All-SEC by the Knoxville News Sentinel (1996); Independence Bowl Offensive MVP (1997); Independence Bowl Hall of Fame

Career NFL statistics
- Rushing attempts: 22
- Rushing yards: 73
- Touchdowns: 1
- Stats at Pro Football Reference

Rondell Christopher Mealey (born February 24, 1977) is an American former professional football player who was a running back in the National Football League (NFL). He played college football for the LSU Tigers.

== Early life ==
Rondell Mealey was born in New Orleans, Louisiana and grew up in Norco, Louisiana. He played high school football at Destrehan High School (Destrehan, Louisiana) where he was a teammate of NFL Hall of Fame safety Ed Reed.

== College career ==
Mealey (#7) played collegiately for the Tigers at Louisiana State University from 1995 to 1999. Mealey redshirted in 1995 and during his freshman season in 1996, rushed for 603 yards and 10 touchdowns.

In 1997 during his sophomore season, Mealey rushed for 664 yards and scored 7 touchdowns. Following the regular season, Mealey put on a performance in the 1997 Independence Bowl against Notre Dame that led to him being inducted into the Independence Bowl Hall of Fame in June 2010. With LSU losing 6-3 at halftime, Mealey filling in for an injured Kevin Faulk, rushed for 222 yards and two fourth-quarter touchdowns to lead LSU to a 27-9 victory.

During his junior season in 1997, Mealey continued to split carries with All-American Kevin Faulk. He was the second leading rusher on the team, rushing for 334 yards and 4 touchdowns. In 1998 as a senior offensive team captain and starting tailback, Mealy was the leading rusher on the team, rushing for 637 yards and 8 touchdowns.

Mealey finished his career at LSU as the sixth-leading rusher in school history. His 29 rushing touchdowns tied for the fifth most in school history and his average of 4.9 yards per carry tied for the third best in school history.

=== College honors ===
- 1996 Freshman All-SEC by the Knoxville News Sentinel
- 1997 Independence Bowl Offensive MVP
- 1999 National "L" Club Award
- Member of the 1999 Blue–Gray Football Classic
- Member of the 2000 East–West Shrine Game
- Member of the 2000 Senior Bowl
- Member of the Independence Bowl Hall of Fame

=== College statistics ===
College career statistics*
Year	Team	GP	Rushing				Receiving				Scrimmage		
Year	Team	GP	Att	Yds	Avg	TD	Rec	Yds	Avg	TD	Plays	Yds	TD
1996	LSU	11	103	603	5.9	10	8	86	10.8	1	111	689	11
1997	LSU	11	112	664	5.9	7	7	60	8.6	0	119	724	7
1998	LSU	11	68	334	4.9	4	2	9	4.5	2	70	343	6
1999	LSU	11	170	637	3.7	8	16	147	9.2	1	186	784	9
College totals		44	453	2,238	4.9	29	33	302	9.2	4	486	2,540	33

Notes:

- * Does not include bowl games

== Pre-Draft ==
Pre-draft measurables
Height	Weight	40-yard dash	10-yard split	20-yard split	20-yard shuttle	Three-cone drill	Vertical jump	Broad jump
6 ft 0 in (1.83 m)	212 lb (96 kg)	4.69 s	1.59 s	2.70 s	4.15 s	6.89 s	33 in (0.84 m)	10 ft 0 in (3.05 m)
All values from NFL Combine

== Professional career ==
Rondell Mealey was selected in the seventh round (252nd pick overall) of the 2000 NFL draft by the Green Bay Packers. As a Packer from 2000 to 2002, Mealey mainly served as a backup running back and played on special teams seeing playing time in 13 games over three seasons. He had his first NFL start in early September during the 2002 season. Mealey was placed on waivers by the Packers in late September 2002.

Despite interest and tryouts for the Detroit Lions, Houston Texans and Tampa Bay Buccaneers, Mealey did not play professionally again after being released by the Packers.

=== NFL statistics ===
Year	Team	G	Att	Yds	Avg	Long	Rush TD	Rec	Yds	Avg	Long	Rec TD
2000	GB	0	0	0	0.0	0	0	0	0	0.0	0	0
2001	GB	11	11	37	3.4	9	0	2	31	15.5	19	0
2002	GB	2	11	36	3.3	18	1	7	45	6.4	11	0
Career		13	22	73	3.3	18	1	9	76	8.4	19	0

== Personal life ==
Mealey works for Marathon Oil in southern Louisiana.

== See also ==
- LSU Tigers football statistical leaders
