= 1997 Kent State Golden Flashes football team =

American college football season

1997 Kent State Golden Flashes football
- Conference: Mid-American Conference
- East Division
- Record: 3–8 (3–5 MAC)
- Head coach: Jim Corrigall (4th season)
- Offensive coordinator: Charley Molnar (4th season)
- Home stadium: Dix Stadium

1997 Mid-American Conference football standings
	Conf.			Overall
Team	W		L	W		L
East Division
Marshall x$	7	–	1	10	–	3
Miami (OH)	6	–	2	8	–	3
Ohio	6	–	2	8	–	3
Bowling Green	3	–	5	3	–	8
Kent State	3	–	5	3	–	8
Akron	2	–	7	2	–	9
West Division
Toledo x	7	–	1	9	–	3
Western Michigan	6	–	2	8	–	3
Ball State	4	–	4	5	–	6
Eastern Michigan	4	–	5	4	–	7
Central Michigan	1	–	7	2	–	9
Northern Illinois	0	–	8	0	–	11
Championship: Marshall 34, Toledo 14
$ – Conference champion; x – Division champion/co-champions

The 1997 Kent State Golden Flashes football team was an American football team that represented Kent State University in the Mid-American Conference (MAC) during the 1997 NCAA Division I-A football season. In their fifth and final season under head coach Jim Corrigall, the Golden Flashes compiled a 3–8 record (3–5 against MAC opponents), finished in a tie for fourth place in the MAC East, and were outscored by all opponents by a combined total of 490 to 337.

The team's statistical leaders included running back Astron Whatley with 876 rushing yards, quarterback Jose Davis with 2,707 passing yards, and wide receiver Eugene Baker with 1,549 receiving yards. Four Kent State players were selected as first-team All-MAC players: Whatley, Baker, offensive guard Bob Hallen, and offensive tackle Steve Zahursky.

== Schedule ==
Date	Time	Opponent	Site	Result	Attendance
August 28		at Ohio	Peden Stadium; Athens, OH	L 7–31	
September 6	7:00 p.m.	at No. 9 (I-AA) Youngstown State*	Stambaugh Stadium; Youngstown, OH	L 23–44	17,974
September 13	3:30 p.m.	Marshall	Dix Stadium; Kent, OH	L 17–42	11,021
September 20		at Eastern Michigan	Rynearson Stadium; Ypsilanti, MI	W 41–38	
October 4	2:00 p.m.	UCF*	Dix Stadium; Kent, OH	L 43–59	10,584
October 11		Miami (OH)	Dix Stadium; Kent, OH	L 26–62	
October 18		at Western Michigan	Waldo Stadium; Kalamazoo, MI	L 27–50	
October 25		Central Michigan	Dix Stadium; Kent, OH	W 60–37	
November 1		Bowling Green	Dix Stadium; Kent, OH (Anniversary Award)	W 29–20	
November 8		at Akron	Rubber Bowl; Akron, OH (Wagon Wheel)	L 35–45	
November 22		at Navy*	Navy–Marine Corps Memorial Stadium; Annapolis, MD	L 29–62	
*Non-conference game; Rankings from AP Poll released prior to the game; All times are in Eastern time

== Roster ==
1997 Kent State Golden Flashes football team roster
Players
Coaches
Offense

Pos.	#	Name	Class
QB	6	Jose Davis	So
TE	46	Jason Gavadza	So
QB	13	Todd Goebbel	Jr
TE	82	Dan Goodspeed	Jr
C	66	Bob Hallen	Sr
QB	18	Brian Magrell	Jr
QB	10	Jon Rapella	Fr
QB	19	Zach Williams	Fr

Defense

Pos.	#	Name	Class

Special teams

Pos.	#	Name	Class

Head coach

- Jim Corrigall

Coordinators/assistant coaches

- Lee Gissendaner (graduate assistant)

Legend

- (C) Team captain
- (S) Suspended
- (I) Ineligible
- Injured
- Redshirt

Roster
Last update: 1998-01-30
