= 1997 Bowling Green Falcons football team =

American college football season

1997 Bowling Green Falcons football
- Conference: Mid-American Conference
- East Division
- Record: 3–8 (3–5 MAC)
- Head coach: Gary Blackney (7th season)
- Offensive coordinator: Mike Faragalli (2nd season)
- Defensive coordinator: Paul Ferraro (7th season)
- Home stadium: Doyt Perry Stadium

1997 Mid-American Conference football standings
	Conf.			Overall
Team	W		L	W		L
East Division
Marshall x$	7	–	1	10	–	3
Miami (OH)	6	–	2	8	–	3
Ohio	6	–	2	8	–	3
Bowling Green	3	–	5	3	–	8
Kent State	3	–	5	3	–	8
Akron	2	–	7	2	–	9
West Division
Toledo x	7	–	1	9	–	3
Western Michigan	6	–	2	8	–	3
Ball State	4	–	4	5	–	6
Eastern Michigan	4	–	5	4	–	7
Central Michigan	1	–	7	2	–	9
Northern Illinois	0	–	8	0	–	11
Championship: Marshall 34, Toledo 14
$ – Conference champion; x – Division champion/co-champions

The 1997 Bowling Green Falcons football team was an American football team that represented Bowling Green University in the Mid-American Conference (MAC) during the 1997 NCAA Division I-A football season. In their seventh season under head coach Gary Blackney, the Falcons compiled a 3–8 record (3–5 against MAC opponents), finished in a tie for fourth place in the MAC East Division, and were outscored by all opponents by a combined total of 341 to 191.

The team's statistical leaders included Bob Niemet with 1,723 passing yards, Robbie Hollis with 492 rushing yards, and Damron Hamilton with 777 receiving yards.

== Schedule ==
Date	Opponent	Site	Result	Attendance	Source
August 30	at Louisiana Tech*	Joe Aillet Stadium; Ruston, LA	L 23–30	19,569	
September 6	Miami (OH)	Doyt Perry Stadium; Bowling Green, OH	W 28–21		
September 13	at No. 9 Ohio State*	Ohio Stadium; Columbus, OH	L 13–44	93,151	
September 20	at Akron	Rubber Bowl; Akron, OH	W 31–28		
September 27	at No. 18 Kansas State*	KSU Stadium; Manhattan, KS	L 0–58	41,524	
October 4	Northern Illinois	Doyt Perry Stadium; Bowling Green, OH	W 35–10	17,148	
October 11	Western Michigan	Doyt Perry Stadium; Bowling Green, OH	L 21–34		
October 18	at Ohio	Peden Stadium; Athens, OH	L 0–24		
October 25	No. 24 Toledo	Doyt Perry Stadium; Bowling Green, OH (rivalry)	L 20–35		
November 1	at Kent State	Dix Stadium; Kent, OH (Anniversary Award)	L 20–29		
November 8	at Marshall	Marshall University Stadium; Huntington, WV	L 0–28	23,509	
*Non-conference game; Rankings from AP Poll released prior to the game
