= 1997 Akron Zips football team =

American college football season

1997 Akron Zips football
- Conference: Mid-American Conference
- East Division
- Record: 2–9 (2–7 MAC)
- Head coach: Lee Owens (3rd season)
- Offensive coordinator: Paul Winters (3rd season)
- Defensive coordinator: David Snowball (3rd season)
- Home stadium: Rubber Bowl

1997 Mid-American Conference football standings
	Conf.			Overall
Team	W		L	W		L
East Division
Marshall x$	7	–	1	10	–	3
Miami (OH)	6	–	2	8	–	3
Ohio	6	–	2	8	–	3
Bowling Green	3	–	5	3	–	8
Kent State	3	–	5	3	–	8
Akron	2	–	7	2	–	9
West Division
Toledo x	7	–	1	9	–	3
Western Michigan	6	–	2	8	–	3
Ball State	4	–	4	5	–	6
Eastern Michigan	4	–	5	4	–	7
Central Michigan	1	–	7	2	–	9
Northern Illinois	0	–	8	0	–	11
Championship: Marshall 34, Toledo 14
$ – Conference champion; x – Division champion/co-champions

The 1997 Akron Zips football team represented Akron University in the 1997 NCAA Division I-A football season as members of the Mid-American Conference. They were led by third–year head coach Lee Owens. The Zips played their home games at the Rubber Bowl in Akron, Ohio. They finished the season with a record of 2–9, 2–7 in MAC play to finish in last place in the East Division.

== Schedule ==
Date	Opponent	Site	Result	Attendance	Source
August 30	at No. 6 Nebraska*	Memorial Stadium; Lincoln, NE	L 14–59	75,124	
September 13	at Miami (OH)	Yager Stadium; Oxford, OH	L 20–49		
September 20	Bowling Green	Rubber Bowl; Akron, OH	L 28–31		
September 27	at No. 13 LSU*	Tiger Stadium; Baton Rouge, LA	L 0–56	79,772	
October 4	Central Michigan	Rubber Bowl; Akron, OH	W 53–14		
October 11	at Marshall	Marshall University Stadium; Huntington, WV	L 17–52		
October 18	at Eastern Michigan	Rynearson Stadium; Ypsilanti, MI	L 0–45		
October 25	Ohio	Rubber Bowl; Akron, OH	L 17–21		
November 1	at Ball State	Scheumann Stadium; Muncie, IN	L 14–31		
November 8	Kent State	Rubber Bowl; Akron, OH (Wagon Wheel)	W 45–35		
November 15	at Toledo	Glass Bowl; Toledo, OH	L 10–42		
*Non-conference game; Rankings from AP Poll released prior to the game
