= 1997 Eastern Michigan Eagles football team =

American college football season

1997 Eastern Michigan Eagles football
- Conference: Mid-American Conference
- Record: 4–7 (4–5 MAC)
- Head coach: Rick Rasnick (3rd season)
- Defensive coordinator: Sam Gruneisen (3rd season)
- MVP: Charlie Batch
- Captains: Charlie Batch; Jermaine Brooks; Lional Dalton; Savon Edwards
- Home stadium: Rynearson Stadium

1997 Mid-American Conference football standings
	Conf.			Overall
Team	W		L	W		L
East Division
Marshall x$	7	–	1	10	–	3
Miami (OH)	6	–	2	8	–	3
Ohio	6	–	2	8	–	3
Bowling Green	3	–	5	3	–	8
Kent State	3	–	5	3	–	8
Akron	2	–	7	2	–	9
West Division
Toledo x	7	–	1	9	–	3
Western Michigan	6	–	2	8	–	3
Ball State	4	–	4	5	–	6
Eastern Michigan	4	–	5	4	–	7
Central Michigan	1	–	7	2	–	9
Northern Illinois	0	–	8	0	–	11
Championship: Marshall 34, Toledo 14
$ – Conference champion; x – Division champion/co-champions

The 1997 Eastern Michigan Eagles football team represented Eastern Michigan University in the 1997 NCAA Division I-A football season. In their third season under head coach Rick Rasnick, the Eagles compiled a 4–7 record (4–5 against conference opponents), finished in fourth place in the West Division of the Mid-American Conference, and were outscored by their opponents, 352 to 329. The team's statistical leaders included Charlie Batch with 3,280 passing yards, Savon Edwards with 627 rushing yards, and Ta-if Kumasi with 710 receiving yards. Batch went on to play 15 years in the National Football League.

== Schedule ==
Date	Opponent	Site	Result	Attendance	Source
September 6	at Missouri*	Faurot Field; Columbia, MO	L 24–44	52,514	
September 13	at Toledo	Glass Bowl; Toledo, OH	L 35–38		
September 20	Kent State	Rynearson Stadium; Ypsilanti, MI	L 38–41		
September 27	at Central Michigan	Kelly/Shorts Stadium; Mount Pleasant, MI (rivalry)	W 31–24		
October 4	Ohio^{†}	Rynearson Stadium; Ypsilanti, MI	L 7–47		
October 11	Ball State	Rynearson Stadium; Ypsilanti, MI	W 38–32		
October 18	Akron*	Rynearson Stadium; Ypsilanti, MI	W 45–0		
October 25	at Marshall	Marshall University Stadium; Huntington, WV	L 25–48	21,474	
November 1	Western Michigan	Rynearson Stadium; Ypsilanti, MI	L 38–41		
November 8	at Northern Illinois	Huskie Stadium; DeKalb, IL	W 38–10	5,866	
November 15	at UCF*	Florida Citrus Bowl; Orlando, FL	L 10–27	39,433	
*Non-conference game; ^{†}Homecoming

== After the season ==
The following Eagle was selected in the 1998 NFL draft after the season.

Round	Pick	Player	Position	NFL club
2	60	Charlie Batch	Quarterback	Detroit Lions
