= 1997 Ohio Bobcats football team =

American college football season

1997 Ohio Bobcats football
- Conference: Mid-American Conference
- East Division
- Record: 8–3 (6–2 MAC)
- Head coach: Jim Grobe (3rd season)
- Offensive coordinator: Troy Calhoun (1st season)
- Offensive scheme: Triple Option
- Defensive coordinator: Tim DeRuyter (3rd season)
- Home stadium: Peden Stadium

1997 Mid-American Conference football standings
	Conf.			Overall
Team	W		L	W		L
East Division
Marshall x$	7	–	1	10	–	3
Miami (OH)	6	–	2	8	–	3
Ohio	6	–	2	8	–	3
Bowling Green	3	–	5	3	–	8
Kent State	3	–	5	3	–	8
Akron	2	–	7	2	–	9
West Division
Toledo x	7	–	1	9	–	3
Western Michigan	6	–	2	8	–	3
Ball State	4	–	4	5	–	6
Eastern Michigan	4	–	5	4	–	7
Central Michigan	1	–	7	2	–	9
Northern Illinois	0	–	8	0	–	11
Championship: Marshall 34, Toledo 14
$ – Conference champion; x – Division champion/co-champions

The 1997 Ohio Bobcats football team was an American football team that represented Ohio University in the Mid-American Conference (MAC) during the 1997 NCAA Division I-A football season. In their third season under head coach Jim Grobe, the Bobcats compiled an 8–3 record (6–2 against MAC opponents), finished in a tie for second place in the MAC's East Division, and outscored all opponents by a combined total of 301 to 177. They played their home games in Peden Stadium in Athens, Ohio.

The team's statistical leaders included Kareem Wilson with 369 passing yards, Steve Hookfin with 864 rushing yards, and Damion Maxwell with 180 receiving yards.

== Schedule ==
Date	Opponent	Site	Result	Attendance	Source
August 28	Kent State	Peden Stadium; Athens, OH	W 31–7		
September 6	at Maryland*	Byrd Stadium; College Park, MD	W 21–14	30,100	
September 13	at No. 20 Kansas State*	KSU Stadium; Manhattan, KS	L 20–23	42,097	
September 20	Buffalo*	Peden Stadium; Athens, OH	W 50–0	23,336	
September 27	Western Michigan	Peden Stadium; Athens, OH	W 31–7		
October 4	at Eastern Michigan	Rynearson Stadium; Ypsilanti, MI	W 47–7		
October 18	Bowling Green	Peden Stadium; Athens, OH	W 24–0		
October 25	at Akron	Rubber Bowl; Akron, OH	W 21–17		
November 1	Northern Illinois	Huskie Stadium; DeKalb, IL	W 35–30	10,215	
November 8	Miami (OH)	Peden Stadium; Athens, OH (rivalry)	L 21–45		
November 15	at Marshall	Marshall University Stadium; Huntington, WV (rivalry)	L 0–27	32,012	
*Non-conference game; Rankings from AP Poll released prior to the game
