= 1997 Northeast Louisiana Indians football team =

American college football season

1997 Northeast Louisiana Indians football
- Conference: Independent
- Record: 5–7
- Head coach: Ed Zaunbrecher (4th season)
- Offensive coordinator: Ed Zaunbrecher (4th season)
- Defensive coordinator: Drew Fabianich (2nd season)
- Home stadium: Malone Stadium

1997 NCAA Division I-A independents football records
	Conf.			Overall
Team	W		L	W		L
Louisiana Tech		–		9	–	2
Navy		–		7	–	4
Notre Dame		–		7	–	6
UAB		–		5	–	6
UCF		–		5	–	6
Northeast Louisiana		–		5	–	7
Army		–		4	–	7
Arkansas State		–		2	–	9
Southwestern Louisiana		–		1	–	10
Rankings from AP Poll

The 1997 Northeast Louisiana Indians football team represented Northeast Louisiana University (now known as the University of Louisiana at Monroe) as an independent during the 1997 NCAA Division I-A football season. Led by fourth-year head coach Ed Zaunbrecher, the Indians compiled an overall record of 5–7, and the offense scored 226 points while the defense allowed 319 points. The team played home games at Malone Stadium in Monroe, Louisiana.

== Schedule ==
Date	Time	Opponent	Site	Result	Attendance	Source
August 30	7:00 pm	No. 23 (I-AA) Nicholls State	Malone Stadium; Monroe, LA	W 28–0	14,215	
September 6	6:00 pm	at Arkansas	Razorback Stadium; Fayetteville, AR	L 16–28	45,832	
September 13	6:00 pm	at Louisiana Tech	Joe Aillet Stadium; Ruston, LA	L 16–17	28,714	
September 20	12:00 pm	at No. 25 Georgia	Sanford Stadium; Athens, GA	L 3–42	74,113	
September 27	6:00 pm	at Oklahoma State	Lewis Field; Stillwater, OK	L 7–38	35,200	
October 4	7:00 pm	No. 21 (FCS) Northwestern State	Malone Stadium; Monroe, LA	W 17–7	15,834	
October 11	1:30 pm	at Mississippi State	Scott Field; Starkville, MS	L 10–24	30,857	
October 18	6:00 pm	at Kentucky	Commonwealth Stadium; Lexington, KY	L 14–49	57,500	
October 25	4:00 pm	at Southwestern Louisiana	Cajun Field; Lafayette, LA (Battle on the Bayou)	W 28–21 ^{OT}	14,124	
November 1	7:00 pm	UCF	Malone Stadium; Monroe, LA	W 45–41	15,936	
November 15	1:00 pm	Western Michigan	Malone Stadium; Monroe, LA	L 19–32	6,415	
November 22	11:00 pm	at Hawaii	Aloha Stadium; Halawa, HI	W 23–20 ^{OT}	20,801	
Rankings from Coaches' Poll released prior to the game; All times are in Central time
