= 1997 Louisiana Tech Bulldogs football team =

American college football season

1997 Louisiana Tech Bulldogs football
- Conference: Independent
- Record: 9–2
- Head coach: Gary Crowton (2nd season)
- Offensive scheme: Multiple I
- Defensive coordinator: Todd Bradford (1st season)
- Base defense: Multiple
- Home stadium: Joe Aillet Stadium

1997 NCAA Division I-A independents football records
	Conf.			Overall
Team	W		L	W		L
Louisiana Tech		–		9	–	2
Navy		–		7	–	4
Notre Dame		–		7	–	6
UAB		–		5	–	6
UCF		–		5	–	6
Northeast Louisiana		–		5	–	7
Army		–		4	–	7
Arkansas State		–		2	–	9
Southwestern Louisiana		–		1	–	10
Rankings from AP Poll

The 1997 Louisiana Tech Bulldogs football team was an American football team that represented Louisiana Tech University as an independent during the 1997 NCAA Division I-A football season. In their second year under head coach Gary Crowton, the team compiled an 9–2 record.

== Schedule ==
Date	Opponent	Site	Result	Attendance	Source
August 30	Bowling Green	Joe Aillet Stadium; Ruston, LA	W 30–23	19,569	
September 13	Northeast Louisiana	Joe Aillet Stadium; Ruston, LA (rivalry)	W 17–16	28,714	
September 20	Central Michigan	Joe Aillet Stadium; Ruston, LA	W 56–28	15,239	
September 27	at Arkansas	War Memorial Stadium; Little Rock, AR	L 13–17	51,291	
October 4	California	Independence Stadium; Shreveport, LA	W 41–34	24,812	
October 11	at No. 8 Auburn	Jordan–Hare Stadium; Auburn, AL	L 13–49	84,761	
October 18	Arkansas State	Joe Aillet Stadium; Ruston, LA	W 42–14	17,532	
October 25	at Boise State	Bronco Stadium; Boise, ID	W 31–27	20,016	
November 1	at Alabama	Bryant–Denny Stadium; Tuscaloosa, AL	W 26–20	70,123	
November 8	at UAB	Legion Field; Birmingham, AL	W 32–29	17,225	
November 15	at Southwestern Louisiana	Cajun Field; Lafayette, LA (rivalry)	W 63–24	10,083	
Rankings from AP Poll released prior to the game
