= 1997 Northern Illinois Huskies football team =

American college football season

1997 Northern Illinois Huskies football
- Conference: Mid-American Conference
- West Division
- Record: 0–11 (0–8 MAC)
- Head coach: Joe Novak (2nd season)
- MVPs: Deon Mitchell; Steve Smith
- Captains: Kent Booth; Jamie Macdonald; Steve Smith
- Home stadium: Huskie Stadium

1997 Mid-American Conference football standings
	Conf.			Overall
Team	W		L	W		L
East Division
Marshall x$	7	–	1	10	–	3
Miami (OH)	6	–	2	8	–	3
Ohio	6	–	2	8	–	3
Bowling Green	3	–	5	3	–	8
Kent State	3	–	5	3	–	8
Akron	2	–	7	2	–	9
West Division
Toledo x	7	–	1	9	–	3
Western Michigan	6	–	2	8	–	3
Ball State	4	–	4	5	–	6
Eastern Michigan	4	–	5	4	–	7
Central Michigan	1	–	7	2	–	9
Northern Illinois	0	–	8	0	–	11
Championship: Marshall 34, Toledo 14
$ – Conference champion; x – Division champion/co-champions

The 1997 Northern Illinois Huskies football team represented Northern Illinois University as a member of the West Division of the Mid-American Conference (MAC) during the 1997 NCAA Division I-A football season. Led by second-year head coach Joe Novak, the Huskies compiled an overall record of 0–11 with a mark of 0–8 in conference play, placing last out of six teams in the MAC's West Division. Northern Illinois played home games at Huskie Stadium in DeKalb, Illinois.

== Schedule ==
Date	Time	Opponent	Site	TV	Result	Attendance	Source
August 28	6:30 pm	at Central Michigan	Kelly/Shorts Stadium; Mount Pleasant, MI	SCC	L 10–44	19,495	
September 6	6:30 pm	No. 21 Kansas State*	Huskie Stadium; DeKalb, IL		L 7–47	26,873	
September 13	3:00 pm	Western Michigan	Huskie Stadium; DeKalb, IL		L 13–21	8,003	
September 20	6:00 pm	at NC State*	Carter–Finley Stadium; Raleigh, NC		L 14–41	51,500	
October 4	1:00 pm	at Bowling Green	Doyt Perry Stadium; Bowling Green OH		L 10–35	17,148	
October 11	3:00 pm	Vanderbilt*^{†}	Huskie Stadium; DeKalb, IL		L 7–17	17,567	
October 18	1:00 pm	at Toledo	Glass Bowl; Toledo, OH		L 14–41	22,183	
October 25	3:00 pm	Ball State	Huskie Stadium; DeKalb, IL (rivalry)	SCC	L 14–21	10,031	
November 1	1:00 pm	Ohio	Huskie Stadium; DeKalb, IL		L 30–35	10,215	
November 8	1:00 pm	Eastern Michigan	Huskie Stadium; DeKalb, IL		L 10–38	5,866	
November 15	12:00 pm	at Miami (OH)	Yager Stadium; Oxford, OH		L 0–42	6,508	
*Non-conference game; ^{†}Homecoming; Rankings from AP Poll released prior to the game; All times are in Central time
