= 1997 Notre Dame Fighting Irish football team =

American college football season

1997 Notre Dame Fighting Irish football

Independence Bowl, L 9–27 vs. LSU
- Conference: Independent
- Record: 7–6
- Head coach: Bob Davie (1st season)
- Offensive coordinator: Jim Colletto (1st season)
- Offensive scheme: Option
- Defensive coordinator: Greg Mattison (1st season)
- Base defense: 4–3
- MVP: Autry Denson
- Captains: Melvin Dansby; Ron Powlus; Allen Rossum
- Home stadium: Notre Dame Stadium

1997 NCAA Division I-A independents football records
	Conf.			Overall
Team	W		L	W		L
Louisiana Tech		–		9	–	2
Navy		–		7	–	4
Notre Dame		–		7	–	6
UAB		–		5	–	6
UCF		–		5	–	6
Northeast Louisiana		–		5	–	7
Army		–		4	–	7
Arkansas State		–		2	–	9
Southwestern Louisiana		–		1	–	10
Rankings from AP Poll

The 1997 Notre Dame Fighting Irish football team was an American football team that represented the University of Notre Dame as an independent during the 1997 NCAA Division I-A football season. In their first year under head coach Bob Davie, the Irish compiled a 7–6 record and outscored opponents by a total of 273 to 238. They were ranked No. 11 in the preseason AP poll, but lost five of their first seven games. They then won five consecutive games to become bowl eligible and ended the season with a loss to LSU in the Independence Bowl.

Fifth-year senior quarterback Ron Powlus led the team with 2,078 passing yards and set single-season Irish records for pass attempts (298) and completions (182). Cornerback and kick returner Allen Rossum set an NCAA single-season record with nine returns for touchdowns (three each on interceptions, punts, and kickoffs).The team's other statistical leaders included tailback Autry Denson (1,268 rushing yards, 78 points scored), wide receiver Malcolm Johnson (596 receiving yards), wide receiver Bobby Brown (45 receptions), and linebacker Jimmy Friday (109 tackles).

The team played its home games at Notre Dame Stadium in Notre Dame, Indiana.

== Schedule ==
Date	Time	Opponent	Rank	Site	TV	Result	Attendance	Source
September 6	2:30 p.m.	Georgia Tech	No. 11	Notre Dame Stadium; Notre Dame, IN (rivalry)	NBC	W 17–13	80,225	
September 13	3:30 p.m.	at Purdue	No. 12	Ross–Ade Stadium; West Lafayette, IN (rivalry)	ABC	L 17–28	68,789	
September 20	2:30 p.m.	No. 17 Michigan State		Notre Dame Stadium; Notre Dame, IN (rivalry)	NBC	L 7–23	80,225	
September 27	3:30 p.m.	at No. 6 Michigan		Michigan Stadium; Ann Arbor, MI (rivalry)	ABC	L 14–21	106,508	
October 4	3:30 p.m.	at No. 19 Stanford		Stanford Stadium; Stanford, CA (rivalry)	ABC	L 15–33	75,651	
October 11	3:30 p.m.	at Pittsburgh		Pitt Stadium; Pittsburgh, PA (rivalry)	CBS	W 45–21	47,306	
October 18	2:30 p.m.	USC		Notre Dame Stadium; Notre Dame, IN (rivalry)	NBC	L 17–20	80,225	
October 25	2:30 p.m.	Boston College		Notre Dame Stadium; Notre Dame, IN (Holy War)	NBC	W 52–20	80,225	
November 1	1:30 p.m.	Navy		Notre Dame Stadium; Notre Dame, IN (rivalry)	NBC	W 21–17	80,225	
November 15	3:30 p.m.	at No. 11 LSU		Tiger Stadium; Baton Rouge, LA	CBS	W 24–6	80,556	
November 22	1:30 p.m.	No. 22 West Virginia		Notre Dame Stadium; Notre Dame, IN	NBC	W 21–14	80,225	
November 29	7:30 p.m.	at Hawaii		Aloha Stadium; Halawa, HI	ESPN	W 23–22	41,509	
December 28	8:00 p.m.	vs. No. 15 LSU		Independence Stadium; Shreveport, LA (Independence Bowl)	ESPN	L 9–27	50,459	
Rankings from AP Poll released prior to the game; All times are in Eastern time

== Rankings ==
Ranking movements Legend: ██ Increase in ranking ██ Decrease in ranking — = Not ranked
	Week																	
Poll	Pre	1	2	3	4	5	6	7	8	9	10	11	12	13	14	15	16	Final
AP	11	11	11	12	—	—	—	—	—	—	—	—	—	—	—	—	—	—
Coaches	12		13	15	—	—	—	—	—	—	—	—	—	—	—	—	—	—

== Game summaries ==
=== Georgia Tech ===
The Irish began the Davie era at home, playing Georgia Tech in the newly renovated Notre Dame Stadium. The Irish christened the stadium with a close win over the Yellow Jackets that was sparked by a renewed running game and key defensive stops late in the game. With the close win, the Irish showed their weakness and dropped a spot in the national ranking.

=== Purdue ===
The next week, at Purdue, though the Irish had 457 total yards, they only managed 17 points. With key mistakes on offense and a confused defense, the Irish lost 28–17 and dropped out of the rankings.

=== Michigan ===
Week 4: Notre Dame at (6) Michigan
(Michigan–Notre Dame rivalry game)

Team	1	2	3	4	Total
Notre Dame (1–2)	7	7	0	0	14
• Michigan (2–0)	0	7	14	0	21

- Date: September 27
- Location: Michigan Stadium
  Ann Arbor, MI
- Game attendance: 106,508

Scoring summary
1	3:16	ND	Bobby Brown 15-yard pass from Ron Powlus (Jim Sanson kick)	ND 7–0
2	13:40	MICH	Clarence Williams 4-yard run (Kraig Baker kick)	Tied 7–7
2	0:18	ND	Tony Driver 2-yard run (Jim Sanson kick)	ND 14–7
3	14:36	MICH	Tai Streets 41-yard pass from Brian Griese (Kraig Baker kick)	Tied 14–14
3	9:21	MICH	Chris Floyd 14-yard run (Kraig Baker kick)	MICH 21–14

For its fourth game of the season, Notre Dame faced Michigan in the 27th match between college football's winningest programs. Michigan won the game, 21–14, in front of a crowd of 106,508, the sixth largest in the history of Michigan Stadium at that time. Notre Dame ended the day with its first three-game losing streak in 12 years.

In the first quarter, Notre Dame scored first on a 15-yard touchdown pass from Ron Powlus to Bobby Brown, culminating a 12-play, 78-yard drive. In the second quarter, the Wolverines tied the game on a 4-yard touchdown run by Clarence Williams to complete an 11-play, 68-yard drive. Notre Dame regained the lead late in the second quarter on a 98-yard drive ending in a two-yard run by Tony Driver with 18 seconds left in the half.

Within the first 24 seconds of the second half, Brian Griese and Tai Streets connected on back-to-back passes of 15 and 41 yards to tie the game at 14. Michigan scored again just over five minutes later on a 14-yard run by Chris Floyd. Michigan's defense overcame three fourth-quarter turnovers and held Notre Dame scoreless in the second half to preserve the 21–14 lead. After Aaron Shea lost a fumble at the Michigan 47-yard line, cornerback Tommy Hendricks made a diving interception in the end zone with 10:34 remaining in the game. When Notre Dame recovered a loose ball two minutes later at the Wolverines 42-yard line, Michigan's defense forced a punt after a three-and-out. The Wolverines suffered a third turnover late in the fourth quarter when Griese and Chris Howard botched a handoff that Notre Dame recovered at the Michigan 28-yard line. Notre Dame drove to the 20-yard line, but Glen Steele and James Hall made a key stop on fourth down. Howard helped Michigan run out the final 3:26 with runs of 27, seven, nine and eight yards.

Notre Dame outgained Michigan in total offense by a margin of 354 yards to 345 yards. Notre Dame's offensive standouts were Powlus (177 passing yards) and Malcolm Johnson (106 receiving yards). However, Notre Dame was penalized 10 times for 92 yards, including six holding infractions, one of which nullified a pass interference penalty against Woodson. Michigan's offensive stars of the game were Griese (16-of-22 passing for 177 yards), Howard (91 rushing yards rushing on 16 carries) and Streets (3 receptions for 77 yards).

=== Pittsburgh ===
The Irish looked to be getting back on track with a trip to face Pittsburgh. With a renewed running game, the Irish beat the struggling Panthers by 24.

=== USC ===
With the offense struggling once again in their next game, a loss to rival University of Southern California (USC), the Irish hit, what was called, "rock bottom."

=== Navy ===
Navy Midshipmen at Notre Dame Fighting Irish

Quarter	1	2	3	4	Total
Navy	7	3	7	0	17
Notre Dame	7	0	7	7	21

at Notre Dame Stadium • South Bend, Indiana

- Date: November 1
- Game time: 1:30 p.m.
- TV: NBC
- Notre Dame Football Archives

Game information

Navy

- Chris McCoy
  147 Rush Yds, 2 TD

Notre Dame

- Ron Powlus
  7/17, 99 Yds, TD
- Autry Denson
  125 Rush Yds

Allen Rossum knocked Pat McGrew out at the two-yard line on a Hail Mary pass to preserve Notre Dame's 34th straight win over Navy

Scoring summary

Quarter	Time	Drive			Team	Scoring information	Score	
Quarter	Time	Plays	Yards	TOP	Team	Scoring information	NAVY	ND
1	12:02		60		Navy	Chris McCoy 9-yard touchdown run, Tom Vanderhorst kick good	7	0
1	4:37	2			Notre Dame	Bobby Brown 14-yard touchdown reception from Ron Powlus, Cengia kick good	7	7
2	8:07	8	30		Navy	22-yard field goal by Tom Vanderhorst	10	7
3	13:36				Notre Dame	Autry Denson 48-yard touchdown run, Cengia kick good	10	14
3	2:59				Navy	Chris McCoy 2-yard touchdown run, Vanderhorst kick good	17	14
4	5:48	17		7:30	Notre Dame	Autry Denson 5-yard touchdown run, Cengia kick good	17	21
"TOP" = time of possession. For other American football terms, see Glossary of American football.							17	21

=== LSU ===
The Irish next went to LSU to face the 11th-ranked Tigers. Looked to be outmatched, the Irish didn't commit a penalty all game, had no turnovers, and didn't give up any plays longer than one 28 yard pass, to upset the Tigers and move back to 5–5 on the season.

=== Boston College ===
With a slight quarterback controversy, the Irish next faced Boston College. Though backup quarterback Jarious Jackson played 21 downs, Powlus led the Irish with 267 passing yards to rout the Eagles and put the Irish offense back on track.

=== West Virginia ===
The Irish then faced 22nd ranked West Virginia for their final home game. With the game tied late in the fourth quarter, Powlus led the Irish on a drive that was capped by his final touchdown pass at Notre Dame Stadium for the game-winning touchdown. With the win the Irish beat ranked opponents on consecutive Saturdays for the first time since 1992,

=== LSU (Independence Bowl) ===
Once again facing LSU in Louisiana, in the [ndependence Bowl, this time with the Tigers ranked 15th, LSU dominated on offense and beat the Irish 27–9. Though the Irish finished with a loss, the 7–6 record was the biggest Irish turn around in team history.

== Roster ==
1997 Notre Dame Fighting Irish football team roster
Players
Coaches
Offense

Pos.	#	Name	Class
RB	28	Ken Barry	Sr
WR	88	Bobby Brown	So
QB	8	Eric Chappell	So
RB	23	Autry Denson	Jr
TE	84	Mike Denvir	Sr
OT	73	Mike Doughty	Sr
WR	18	Joey Getherall	Fr
TE	87	Jabari Holloway	Fr
QB	7	Jarious Jackson	So
WR	11	Jay Johnson	So
WR	6	Malcolm Johnson	Sr
WR	9	Raki Nelson	So
OT	54	Luke Petitgout	Jr
QB	3	Ron Powlus	Sr
TE	89	Tim Ridder	Jr
G	79	Mike Rosenthal	Jr
RB	33	Jamie Spencer	Jr
RB	32	Clement Stokes	Sr
OT	71	Jerry Wisne	Jr

Defense

Pos.	#	Name	Class
DE	56	Kurt Belisle	Sr
DT	95	Corey Bennett	Sr
S	1	Deke Cooper	So
CB	14	Ivory Covington	Sr
DE	51	Melvin Dansby	Sr
LB	13	Jimmy Friday	Jr
S	2	Benny Guilbeaux	Jr
LB	27	Bobbie Howard	Jr
DE	85	Antwon Jones	Jr
LB	4	Kory Minor	Jr
CB	15	Allen Rossum	Sr
S	5	A'Jani Sanders	Jr
DE	77	Brad Williams	So
CB	1	Brock Williams	Fr

Special teams

Pos.	#	Name	Class
K	12	Scott Cengia	Sr
K		Kevin Kopka
K	19	Jim Sanson	So
P	17	Hunter Smith	Jr

Head coach

- Bob Davie

Coordinators/assistant coaches

- Jim Colletto (OC)
- Greg Mattison (DC)
- Charlie Strong (DL)

Legend

- (C) Team captain
- (S) Suspended
- (I) Ineligible
- Injured
- Redshirt

Roster
Last update: 1997-10-09

== Statistical leaders ==
Passing

1. Ron Powlus - 182 of 298 (61.1%) for 2,078 yards, 9 touchdowns and 7 interceptions
2. Jarious Jackson - 8 of 17 (47.1%) for 146 yards, 1 touchdown and 1 interception

Rushing

1. Autry Denson - 1,268 yards on 264 carries, 4.8-yard average, 12 touchdowns
2. Clement Stokes - 351 yards on 75 carries, 4.6-yard average, 3 touchdowns
3. Ken Barry - 196 yards on 35 carries, 5.3-yard average, 0 touchdowns
4. Tony Driver - 133 yards on 35 carris, 3.6-yard average, 3 touchdowns
5. Jamie Spencer - 108 yards on 24 carries, 4.4-yard average, 1 touchdown

Receiving

1. Malcolm Johnson - 42 receptions for 596 yards, 14.2-yard average, 2 touchdowns
2. Bobby Brown - 45 receptions for 543 yards, 12.1-yard average, 6 touchdowns
3. Raki Nelson - 23 receptions for 341 yards, 0 touchdowns
4. Autry Denson - 30 receptions for 175 yards, 5.8-yard average, 1 touchdown
5. Jabari Holloway - 8 receptions for 144 yards, 18.0-yard average, 1 touchdown
6. Joey Getherall - 9 receptions for 193 yards, 11.4-yard average, 0 touchdowns

Scoring

1. Autry Denson - 78 points, 13 touchdowns
2. Bobby Brown - 36 points, 6 touchdowns
3. Jim Sanson - 30 points, 15 of 16 PAT, 5 of 10 field goals
4. Scott Cengia - 25 points, 16 of 17 PAT, 3 of 5 field goals
5. Jarious Jackson - 24 points, 4 touchdowns

Tackles

1. Jimmy Friday (LB) - 109
2. Melvin Dansby (DE) - 103
3. Bobbie Howard (LB) - 91
4. Kory Minor (LB) - 85
5. Lammont Bryant (LB) - 78
6. Benny Guilbeaux (S) - 68
7. Ivory Covington (CB) - 66
8. Deveron Harper - 60
9. A'Jani Sanders (S) - 58
10. Allen Rossum (CB) - 53
11. Grant Irons - 50

== Awards and honors ==
Tailback Autry Denson received All-America honors from Football News and was voted by the players as the team's most valuable player.

Defensive end Melvin Dansby received All-America honors from Football News, was selected as Notre Dame's Lineman of the Year, and won the Nick Pietrosante Award.

Linebacker Kory Minor received All-America honors from Football News.

Offensive guard Mike Rosenthal received All-America honors from Football News.
