= 1997 Army Cadets football team =

American college football season

1997 Army Cadets football
- Conference: Independent
- Record: 4–7
- Head coach: Bob Sutton (7th season)
- Offensive coordinator: Greg Gregory (9th as OC; 16th overall season)
- Offensive scheme: Triple option
- Defensive coordinator: Denny Doornbos (7th season)
- Base defense: 4–3
- Captains: Joe Sachitano; Matt Yost
- Home stadium: Michie Stadium

1997 NCAA Division I-A independents football records
	Conf.			Overall
Team	W		L	W		L
Louisiana Tech		–		9	–	2
Navy		–		7	–	4
Notre Dame		–		7	–	6
UAB		–		5	–	6
UCF		–		5	–	6
Northeast Louisiana		–		5	–	7
Army		–		4	–	7
Arkansas State		–		2	–	9
Southwestern Louisiana		–		1	–	10
Rankings from AP Poll

The 1997 Army Cadets football team was an American football team that represented the United States Military Academy as an independent during the 1997 NCAA Division I-A football season. In their seventh season under head coach Bob Sutton, the Cadets compiled a 4–7 record and were outscored by their opponents by a combined total of 311 to 221. In the annual Army–Navy Game, the Cadets lost to Navy, 39–7.

== Schedule ==
Date	Time	Opponent	Site	Result	Attendance	Source
September 6	1:00 p.m.	Marshall	Michie Stadium; West Point, NY	L 25–35	30,358	
September 13		Lafayette	Michie Stadium; West Point, NY	W 41–14	31,363	
September 20	7:00 p.m.	at Duke	Wallace Wade Stadium; Durham, NC	L 17–20	21,748	
September 27		Miami (OH)	Michie Stadium; West Point, NY	L 14–38		
October 4		at Tulane	Louisiana Superdome; New Orleans, LA	L 0–41	16,242	
October 18		Rutgers	Michie Stadium; West Point, NY	W 37–35		
October 25		Colgate	Michie Stadium; West Point, NY	W 35–27	39,351	
November 8		at Air Force	Falcon Stadium; Colorado Springs, CO (Commander-in-Chief's Trophy)	L 0–24		
November 15		North Texas	Michie Stadium; West Point, NY	W 25–14		
November 22	12:00 p.m.	at Boston College	Alumni Stadium; Chestnut Hill, MA	L 20–24	13,909	
December 6		vs. Navy	Giants Stadium; East Rutherford, NJ (Army–Navy Game)	L 7–39		
All times are in Eastern time
