= 1997 Central Michigan Chippewas football team =

American college football season

1997 Central Michigan Chippewas football
- Conference: Mid-American Conference
- West Division
- Record: 2–9 (1–7 MAC)
- Head coach: Dick Flynn (4th season)
- Offensive coordinator: Tom Kearly (7th season)
- Defensive coordinator: Jim Schulte (4th season)
- MVP: Rollie Ferris
- Home stadium: Kelly/Shorts Stadium

1997 Mid-American Conference football standings
	Conf.			Overall
Team	W		L	W		L
East Division
Marshall x$	7	–	1	10	–	3
Miami (OH)	6	–	2	8	–	3
Ohio	6	–	2	8	–	3
Bowling Green	3	–	5	3	–	8
Kent State	3	–	5	3	–	8
Akron	2	–	7	2	–	9
West Division
Toledo x	7	–	1	9	–	3
Western Michigan	6	–	2	8	–	3
Ball State	4	–	4	5	–	6
Eastern Michigan	4	–	5	4	–	7
Central Michigan	1	–	7	2	–	9
Northern Illinois	0	–	8	0	–	11
Championship: Marshall 34, Toledo 14
$ – Conference champion; x – Division champion/co-champions

The 1997 Central Michigan Chippewas football team represented Central Michigan University in the Mid-American Conference (MAC) during the 1997 NCAA Division I-A football season. In their fourth season under head coach Dick Flynn, the Chippewas compiled a 2–9 record (1–7 against MAC opponents), finished in fifth place in the MAC's West Division, and were outscored by their opponents, 479 to 282. The team played its home games in Kelly/Shorts Stadium in Mount Pleasant, Michigan, with attendance of 94,162 in five home games.

The team's statistical leaders included Tim Crowley with 2,204 passing yards, Eric Flowers with 909 rushing yards, and Reggie Allen with 877 receiving yards. Offensive guard Rollie Ferris was selected as the team's most valuable player.

== Schedule ==
Date	Opponent	Site	Result	Attendance	Source
August 28	Northern Illinois	Kelly/Shorts Stadium; Mount Pleasant, MI	W 44–10	19,495	
September 6	at No. 2 Florida*	Ben Hill Griffin Stadium; Gainesville, FL	L 6–82	85,347	
September 13	Boise State*	Kelly/Shorts Stadium; Mount Pleasant, MI	W 44–26	19,003	
September 20	at Louisiana Tech*	Joe Aillet Stadium; Ruston, LA	L 28–56	15,239	
September 27	Eastern Michigan	Kelly/Shorts Stadium; Mount Pleasant, MI (rivalry)	L 24–31		
October 4	at Akron	Rubber Bowl; Akron, OH	L 14–53		
October 11	Toledo	Kelly/Shorts Stadium; Mount Pleasant, MI	L 10–41		
October 18	at Ball State	Scheumann Stadium; Muncie, IN	L 34–37 ^{OT}		
October 25	at Kent State	Dix Stadium; Kent, OH	L 37–60		
November 1	Marshall	Kelly/Shorts Stadium; Mount Pleasant, MI	L 17–45	15,324	
November 8	at Western Michigan	Waldo Stadium; Kalamazoo, MI (rivalry)	L 24–38		
*Non-conference game; Rankings from AP Poll released prior to the game

== Roster ==
1997 Central Michigan Chippewas football team roster
Players
Coaches
Offense

Pos.	#	Name	Class
QB	9	Tim Crowley	Sr
WR	6	Joe Danna	Jr

Defense

Pos.	#	Name	Class
OLB	89	Joe Fortuna	Sr

Special teams

Pos.	#	Name	Class

Head coach

- Dick Flynn

Coordinators/assistant coaches

Legend

- (C) Team captain
- (S) Suspended
- (I) Ineligible
- Injured
- Redshirt

Roster
