= 1997 Western Michigan Broncos football team =

American college football season

1997 Western Michigan Broncos football
- Conference: Mid-American Conference
- West Division
- Record: 8–3 (6–2 MAC)
- Head coach: Gary Darnell (1st season)
- Offensive coordinator: Bill Cubit (1st season)
- Defensive coordinator: Chuck Driesbach (1st season)
- MVP: Tarrence McEvans
- Home stadium: Waldo Stadium

1997 Mid-American Conference football standings
	Conf.			Overall
Team	W		L	W		L
East Division
Marshall x$	7	–	1	10	–	3
Miami (OH)	6	–	2	8	–	3
Ohio	6	–	2	8	–	3
Bowling Green	3	–	5	3	–	8
Kent State	3	–	5	3	–	8
Akron	2	–	7	2	–	9
West Division
Toledo x	7	–	1	9	–	3
Western Michigan	6	–	2	8	–	3
Ball State	4	–	4	5	–	6
Eastern Michigan	4	–	5	4	–	7
Central Michigan	1	–	7	2	–	9
Northern Illinois	0	–	8	0	–	11
Championship: Marshall 34, Toledo 14
$ – Conference champion; x – Division champion/co-champions

The 1997 Western Michigan Broncos football team was an American football team that represented Western Michigan University during the 1997 NCAA Division I-A football season. In their first season under head coach Gary Darnell, the Broncos compiled an 8–3 record and finished in second place in the West Division of the Mid-American Conference (MAC). In non-conference games, they defeated Temple (34–14) and Louisiana–Monroe (32–19) and lost to Michigan State (42–10).

The team's statistical leaders were Tim Lester with 2,160 passing yards, Robert Sanford with 1,033 rushing yards, and Corey Alston with 32 catches for 761 receiving yards. Sanford was named the MAC freshman of the year.

Gary Darnell was hired as Western's head football coach on December 14, 1996. He had been an assistant coach at Texas since 1992, including three years as defensive coordinator.

== Schedule ==
Date	Opponent	Site	Result	Attendance	Source
August 28	Temple*	Waldo Stadium; Kalamazoo, MI	W 34–14		
September 6	at Michigan State*	Spartan Stadium; East Lansing, MI	L 10–42	72,317	
September 13	at Northern Illinois	Huskie Stadium; DeKalb, IL	W 21–13	8,003	
September 20	Toledo	Waldo Stadium; Kalamazoo, MI	L 13–23		
September 27	at Ohio	Peden Stadium; Athens, OH	L 7–31		
October 4	Ball State	Waldo Stadium; Kalamazoo, MI	W 21–13		
October 11	at Bowling Green	Doyt Perry Stadium; Bowling Green, OH	W 34–21		
October 18	Kent State	Waldo Stadium; Kalamazoo, MI	W 50–27		
November 1	at Eastern Michigan	Rynearson Stadium; Ypsilanti, MI	W 41–38		
November 8	Central Michigan	Waldo Stadium; Kalamazoo, MI (rivalry)	W 38–24		
November 15	at Northeast Louisiana*	Malone Stadium; Monroe, LA	W 32–19	6,415	
*Non-conference game
