= 1997 Ball State Cardinals football team =

American college football season

1997 Ball State Cardinals football
- Conference: Mid-American Conference
- West Division
- Record: 5–6 (4–4 MAC)
- Head coach: Bill Lynch (3rd season)
- Home stadium: Ball State Stadium

1997 Mid-American Conference football standings
	Conf.			Overall
Team	W		L	W		L
East Division
Marshall x$	7	–	1	10	–	3
Miami (OH)	6	–	2	8	–	3
Ohio	6	–	2	8	–	3
Bowling Green	3	–	5	3	–	8
Kent State	3	–	5	3	–	8
Akron	2	–	7	2	–	9
West Division
Toledo x	7	–	1	9	–	3
Western Michigan	6	–	2	8	–	3
Ball State	4	–	4	5	–	6
Eastern Michigan	4	–	5	4	–	7
Central Michigan	1	–	7	2	–	9
Northern Illinois	0	–	8	0	–	11
Championship: Marshall 34, Toledo 14
$ – Conference champion; x – Division champion/co-champions

The 1997 Ball State Cardinals football team was an American football team that represented Ball State University in the West Division of the Mid-American Conference (MAC) during the 1997 NCAA Division I-A football season. In its third season under head coach Bill Lynch, the team compiled a 5–6 record (4–4 against conference opponents) and finished in third place out of six teams in the MAC West. The team played its home games at Ball State Stadium in Muncie, Indiana.

The team's statistical leaders included Jake Josetti with 1,569 passing yards, LeAndre Moore with 884 rushing yards, Adrian Reese with 526 receiving yards, and Brent Lockliear with 55 points scored.

== Schedule ==
Date	Opponent	Site	Result	Attendance	Source
August 30	at Miami (OH)	Yager Stadium; Oxford, OH	L 10–27		
September 6	James Madison*	Ball State Stadium; Muncie, IN	W 24–6	16,647	
September 13	at Indiana*	Memorial Stadium; Bloomington, IN	L 6–33	38,006	
September 20	at Purdue*	Ross–Ade Stadium; West Lafayette, IN	L 14–28	45,947	
September 27	Marshall	Ball State Stadium; Muncie, IN	L 16–42	20,415	
October 4	at Western Michigan	Waldo Stadium; Kalamazoo, MI	L 13–21		
October 11	at Eastern Michigan	Rynearson Stadium; Ypsilanti, MI	L 32–38		
October 18	Central Michigan	Ball State Stadium; Muncie, IN	W 37–34 ^{OT}		
October 25	at Northern Illinois	Huskie Stadium; DeKalb, IL (rivalry)	W 21–14	10,031	
November 1	Akron	Ball State Stadium; Muncie, IN	W 31–14		
November 8	No. 18 Toledo	Ball State Stadium; Muncie, IN	W 35–3		
*Non-conference game; Rankings from AP Poll released prior to the game
