= 1997 Navy Midshipmen football team =

American college football season

1997 Navy Midshipmen football
- Conference: Independent
- Record: 7–4
- Head coach: Charlie Weatherbie (3rd season)
- Offensive coordinator: Ken Niumatalolo (1st season)
- Offensive scheme: Triple option
- Defensive coordinator: Dick Bumpas (3rd season)
- Base defense: 4–2–5
- MVP: Michael Ogden
- Captains: Chris McCoy; Gervy Alota
- Home stadium: Navy–Marine Corps Memorial Stadium

1997 NCAA Division I-A independents football records
	Conf.			Overall
Team	W		L	W		L
Louisiana Tech		–		9	–	2
Navy		–		7	–	4
Notre Dame		–		7	–	6
UAB		–		5	–	6
UCF		–		5	–	6
Northeast Louisiana		–		5	–	7
Army		–		4	–	7
Arkansas State		–		2	–	9
Southwestern Louisiana		–		1	–	10
Rankings from AP Poll

The 1997 Navy Midshipmen football team represented the United States Naval Academy (USNA) as an independent during the 1997 NCAA Division I-A football season. The team was led by third-year head coach Charlie Weatherbie.

== Schedule ==
Date	Time	Opponent	Site	TV	Result	Attendance	Source
September 5		at San Diego State	Jack Murphy Stadium; San Diego, CA		L 31–45		
September 13		Rutgers	Navy–Marine Corps Memorial Stadium; Annapolis, MD		W 36–7		
September 20		at SMU	Cotton Bowl; Dallas, TX (rivalry)		W 46–16	20,011	
September 27	12:00 p.m.	at Duke	Wallace Wade Stadium; Durham, NC	JPS	L 17–26	17,370	
October 11		Air Force	Navy–Marine Corps Memorial Stadium; Annapolis, MD (Commander-in-Chief's Trophy)		L 7–10		
October 18		VMI^{†}	Navy–Marine Corps Memorial Stadium; Annapolis, MD		W 42–7	30,034	
November 1	1:30 p.m.	at Notre Dame	Notre Dame Stadium; Notre Dame, IN (rivalry)	NBC	L 17–21	80,225	
November 8		Temple	Navy–Marine Corps Memorial Stadium; Annapolis, MD		W 49–17		
November 15		Colgate	Navy–Marine Corps Memorial Stadium; Annapolis, MD		W 52–24	21,038	
November 22		Kent State	Navy–Marine Corps Memorial Stadium; Annapolis, MD		W 62–29		
December 6		vs. Army	Giants Stadium; East Rutherford, NJ (Army–Navy Game)	CBS	W 39–7		
^{†}Homecoming; All times are in Eastern time

== Game summaries ==
=== Army ===
Army Cadets vs. Navy Midshipmen

Quarter	1	2	3	4	Total
Navy	3	23	6	7	39
Army	7	0	0	0	7

at Giants Stadium • East Rutherford, New Jersey

- Date: December 6

Navy's victory over Army snapped a five-game Army win streak, and the 32-point margin of victory was the largest in the series history since the Naval Academy's 51–0 victory in 1973.

== Roster ==
1997 Navy Midshipmen football team roster
Players
Coaches
Offense

Pos.	#	Name	Class
		LeBron Butts
C		Brian Dreschler	Sr
RB		Manny Metcalf
QB	7	Chris McCoy	Sr
		Pat McGrew
WR		Matt O'Donnell	So
G	66	Mike Wahle	Jr
WR	11	Travis Williams	So

Defense

Pos.	#	Name	Class
		Gervy Alota
DE	76	Brian Gray	So
DE	14	Denis Kane	Sr
		Michael Ogden
DE		Chris Person	Sr
LB		Russ Tate
DT		David Viger
LB	50	Travis Cooley	Sr

Special teams

Pos.	#	Name	Class

Head coach

- Charlie Weatherbie

Coordinators/assistant coaches

Legend

- (C) Team captain
- (S) Suspended
- (I) Ineligible
- Injured
- Redshirt

Roster
Last update: 1999-10-08
