= 1997 Arkansas State Indians football team =

American college football season

1997 Arkansas State Indians football
- Conference: Independent
- Record: 2–9
- Head coach: Joe Hollis (1st season)
- Offensive coordinator: Joe Hollis (1st season)
- Defensive coordinator: Dennis Creehan (1st season)
- Home stadium: Indian Stadium

1997 NCAA Division I-A independents football records
	Conf.			Overall
Team	W		L	W		L
Louisiana Tech		–		9	–	2
Navy		–		7	–	4
Notre Dame		–		7	–	6
UAB		–		5	–	6
UCF		–		5	–	6
Northeast Louisiana		–		5	–	7
Army		–		4	–	7
Arkansas State		–		2	–	9
Southwestern Louisiana		–		1	–	10
Rankings from AP Poll

The 1997 Arkansas State Indians football team represented Arkansas State University as an independent during the 1997 NCAA Division I-A football season. Led by first-year head coach Joe Hollis, the Indians compiled a record of 2–9.

== Schedule ==
Date	Opponent	Site	Result	Attendance	Source
August 30	at Georgia	Sanford Stadium; Athens, GA	L 7–38	79,145	
September 13	Central Arkansas	Indian Stadium; Jonesboro, AR	W 36–35		
September 20	Southern Utah	Indian Stadium; Jonesboro, AR	L 24–34		
September 27	at No. 14 Virginia Tech	Lane Stadium; Blacksburg, VA	L 0–50	42,178	
October 4	Southwestern Louisiana^{†}	Indian Stadium; Jonesboro, AR	L 38–41		
October 11	at Memphis	Liberty Bowl Memorial Stadium; Memphis, TN (Paint Bucket Bowl)	L 9–38	21,357	
October 18	at Louisiana Tech	Joe Aillet Stadium; Ruston, LA	L 14–42	17,532	
October 25	at New Mexico State	Aggie Memorial Stadium; Las Cruces, NM	L 20–34		
November 1	at Miami (FL)	Miami Orange Bowl; Miami, FL	L 10–42	20,559	
November 8	Southwest Missouri State	Indian Stadium; Jonesboro, AR	W 35–27		
November 22	UAB	Indian Stadium; Jonesboro, AR	L 7–13	7,318	
^{†}Homecoming; Rankings from AP Poll released prior to the game
