= 1997 Miami RedHawks football team =

American college football season

1997 Miami RedHawks football
- Conference: Mid-American Conference
- East Division
- Record: 8–3 (6–2 MAC)
- Head coach: Randy Walker (8th season)
- Offensive coordinator: Kevin Wilson (6th season)
- Offensive scheme: I formation
- Defensive coordinator: Terry Hoeppner (3rd season)
- Base defense: 4–3
- Home stadium: Yager Stadium

1997 Mid-American Conference football standings
	Conf.			Overall
Team	W		L	W		L
East Division
Marshall x$	7	–	1	10	–	3
Miami (OH)	6	–	2	8	–	3
Ohio	6	–	2	8	–	3
Bowling Green	3	–	5	3	–	8
Kent State	3	–	5	3	–	8
Akron	2	–	7	2	–	9
West Division
Toledo x	7	–	1	9	–	3
Western Michigan	6	–	2	8	–	3
Ball State	4	–	4	5	–	6
Eastern Michigan	4	–	5	4	–	7
Central Michigan	1	–	7	2	–	9
Northern Illinois	0	–	8	0	–	11
Championship: Marshall 34, Toledo 14
$ – Conference champion; x – Division champion/co-champions

The 1997 Miami RedHawks football team was an American football team that represented Miami University in the Mid-American Conference (MAC) during the 1997 NCAA Division I-A football season. In its eighth season under head coach Randy Walker, Miami compiled an 8–3 record (6–2 against MAC opponents), finished in a tie for second place in the MAC, and outscored all opponents by a combined total of 412 to 226. Individual success was led by All-American punter Chad Cornelius, who selected with the 202nd pick by the Cincinnati Bengals in the 1998 NFL draft.

The team's statistical leaders included Sam Ricketts with 2,466 passing yards, Travis Prentice with 1,549 rushing yards, and Jay Hall with 861 receiving yards.

== Schedule ==
Date	Time	Opponent	Site	TV	Result	Attendance	Source
August 30		Ball State	Yager Stadium; Oxford, OH		W 27–10		
September 6		at Bowling Green	Doyt Perry Stadium; Bowling Green, OH		L 21–28		
September 13		Akron	Yager Stadium; Oxford, OH		W 49–20		
September 27		at Army*	Michie Stadium; West Point, NY		W 38–14		
October 4	1:00 p.m.	at No. 14 Virginia Tech*	Lane Stadium; Blacksburg, VA		W 24–17	42,878	
October 11		at Kent State	Dix Stadium; Kent, OH		W 62–26		
October 18	2:00 p.m.	Marshall	Yager Stadium; Oxford, OH	WSAZ	W 45–21	29,027	
October 25		Cincinnati*	Yager Stadium; Oxford, OH (rivalry)		L 31–34 ^{2OT}		
November 1		at No. 22 Toledo	Glass Bowl; Toledo, OH		L 28–35		
November 8		at Ohio	Peden Stadium; Athens, OH (rivalry)		W 45–21		
November 15	1:00 p.m.	Northern Illinois	Yager Stadium; Oxford, OH		W 42–0	6,508	
*Non-conference game; Rankings from AP Poll released prior to the game; All times are in Eastern time
