= 1997 UAB Blazers football team =

American college football season

1997 UAB Blazers football
- Conference: Independent
- Record: 5–6
- Head coach: Watson Brown (3rd season)
- Offensive scheme: Multiple
- Defensive coordinator: Bill Clay (1st season)
- Base defense: 4–3
- Home stadium: Legion Field

1997 NCAA Division I-A independents football records
| | Conf. | | | Overall |
| Team | W | | L | W | | L |
|---|---|---|---|---|---|---|
| Louisiana Tech | | – | | 9 | – | 2 |
| Navy | | – | | 7 | – | 4 |
| Notre Dame | | – | | 7 | – | 6 |
| UAB | | – | | 5 | – | 6 |
| UCF | | – | | 5 | – | 6 |
| Northeast Louisiana | | – | | 5 | – | 7 |
| Army | | – | | 4 | – | 7 |
| Arkansas State | | – | | 2 | – | 9 |
| Southwestern Louisiana | | – | | 1 | – | 10 |
Rankings from AP Poll

The 1997 UAB Blazers football team represented the University of Alabama at Birmingham (UAB) in the 1997 NCAA Division I-A football season, and was the seventh team fielded by the school. The team's head coach was Watson Brown, who entered his third season as the UAB's head coach. They played their home games at Legion Field in Birmingham, Alabama and competed as a Division I-A Independent. The Blazers finished their second season at the I-A level with a record of 5–6.

== Schedule ==
| Date | Time | Opponent | Site | Result | Attendance | Source |
|---|---|---|---|---|---|---|
| August 28 | 7:00 p.m. | at Kansas | Memorial Stadium; Lawrence, KS | L 0–24 | 32,100 | |
| September 6 | 7:00 p.m. | at Memphis | Liberty Bowl Memorial Stadium; Memphis, TN (Battle for the Bones) | L 7–28 | 24,108 | |
| September 13 | 9:00 p.m. | at Arizona | Arizona Stadium; Tucson, AZ | L 10–24 | 36,309 | |
| September 20 | 7:00 p.m. | Jacksonville State | Legion Field; Birmingham, AL | W 34–16 | 23,775 | |
| September 27 | 7:00 p.m. | at Southwestern Louisiana | Cajun Field; Lafayette, LA | W 42–7 | 15,024 | |
| October 4 | 7:00 p.m. | No. 3 (I-AA) Western Kentucky^{†} | Legion Field; Birmingham, AL | W 20–16 | 17,385 | |
| October 11 | 6:00 p.m. | at Cincinnati | Nippert Stadium; Cincinnati, OH | L 29–33 | 20,924 | |
| November 1 | 1:00 p.m. | at No. 22 Virginia Tech | Lane Stadium; Blacksburg, VA | L 0–37 | 37,411 | |
| November 8 | 1:00 p.m. | Louisiana Tech | Legion Field; Birmingham, AL | L 29–32 | 17,225 | |
| November 15 | 1:00 p.m. | Tennessee Tech | Legion Field; Birmingham, AL | W 38–14 | 8,765 | |
| November 22 | 2:00 p.m. | at Arkansas State | Indian Stadium; Jonesboro, AR | W 13–7 | 7,318 | |
^{†}Homecoming; Rankings from AP Poll released prior to the game; All times are in Central time
