= 1997 Independence Bowl =

1997 Poulan/Weed Eater Independence Bowl
Notre Dame Fighting Irish	LSU Tigers
(7–5)	(8–3)
Independent	SEC
9	27
Head coach: Bob Davie	Head coach: Gerry DiNardo
	AP / Coaches / BA; 15 / 15 / 15
	1	2	3	4	Total
Notre Dame	3	3	0	3	9
LSU	0	3	10	14	27
- Date: December 28, 1997
- Season: 1997
- Stadium: Independence Stadium
- Location: Shreveport, Louisiana
- MVP: RB Rondell Mealey; DE Arnold Miller
- Referee: David Neal (MAC)
- Attendance: 50,459

United States TV coverage
- Network: ESPN
- Announcers: Ron Franklin, Mike Gottfried and Adrian Karsten

The 1997 Independence Bowl was a college football postseason bowl rematch between the LSU Tigers and the Notre Dame Fighting Irish.

== Background ==
The Tigers had finished 2nd in the Western Division of the SEC. The Irish went from 1–4 early in the season to 7–5 with wins over Boston College, LSU and West Virginia. This was the second time they faced LSU in 1997. This was LSU's first Independence Bowl since 1995.

== Game summary ==
Notre Dame could only muster two field goals in the first half, but they led 6–3 at halftime in a game clouded by light rain and blustery, cold temperatures. However Wade Richey and Abram Booty got the Tigers into the lead (on a field goal and touchdown reception, respectively) in the 3rd quarter. Trailing 13–6, Notre Dame could only muster one more field goal to narrow the lead as LSU scored twice on Rondell Mealey touchdown runs. Mealey had 34 carries for 222 yards and 2 touchdowns.

== Aftermath ==
Notre Dame defeated LSU 39–36 in South Bend late in the 1998 season. LSU finished 1998 4–7 and was 2–8 in 1999 when coach Gerry DiNardo, an All-American offensive guard at Notre Dame under Ara Parseghian from 1972–74, was fired.

LSU wouldn't reach a bowl game again until 2000 under new coach Nick Saban. Davie led the Irish to the 2001 Fiesta Bowl, where they were blown out by Oregon State. He was fired following a 5–6 campaign in 2001.

Neither team has returned to this bowl since this game.

The Tigers and Fighting Irish have met in three subsequent bowls; LSU won the 2007 Sugar Bowl and Notre Dame the 2014 Music City Bowl and 2018 Citrus Bowl.

== Statistics ==
Statistics	LSU	Notre Dame
First downs	19	19
Yards rushing	265	128
Yards passing	61	115
Total yards	326	243
Punts-Average	4-35.8	5-45.0
Fumbles-Lost	0-0	1-1
Interceptions	0	0
Penalties-Yards	5-55	5-30

== See also ==
- List of college football post-season games that were rematches of regular season games
