= 1997 Toledo Rockets football team =

American college football season

1997 Toledo Rockets football

MAC West Division champion

MAC Championship Game, L 14–34 vs. Marshall
- Conference: Mid-American Conference
- West Division
- Record: 9–3 (7–1 MAC)
- Head coach: Gary Pinkel (7th season)
- Offensive coordinator: Dave Christensen (1st season)
- Offensive scheme: Multiple
- Defensive coordinator: Tom Amstutz (4th season)
- Base defense: 4–4
- Home stadium: Glass Bowl

1997 Mid-American Conference football standings
	Conf.			Overall
Team	W		L	W		L
East Division
Marshall x$	7	–	1	10	–	3
Miami (OH)	6	–	2	8	–	3
Ohio	6	–	2	8	–	3
Bowling Green	3	–	5	3	–	8
Kent State	3	–	5	3	–	8
Akron	2	–	7	2	–	9
West Division
Toledo x	7	–	1	9	–	3
Western Michigan	6	–	2	8	–	3
Ball State	4	–	4	5	–	6
Eastern Michigan	4	–	5	4	–	7
Central Michigan	1	–	7	2	–	9
Northern Illinois	0	–	8	0	–	11
Championship: Marshall 34, Toledo 14
$ – Conference champion; x – Division champion/co-champions

The 1997 Toledo Rockets football team was an American football team that represented the University of Toledo in the Mid-American Conference (MAC) during the 1997 NCAA Division I-A football season. In their seventh season under head coach Gary Pinkel, the Rockets compiled a 9–3 record (7–1 against MAC opponents), finished in first place in the MAC's West Division, lost to Marshall in the MAC Football Championship Game (14–34), and outscored all opponents by a combined total of 356 to 268.

The team's statistical leaders included Chris Wallace with 2,955 passing yards, Dwayne Harris with 1,278 rushing yards, and Brock Kreitzburg with 626 receiving yards.

== Schedule ==
Date	Opponent	Rank	Site	TV	Result	Attendance
September 6	Purdue*		Glass Bowl; Toledo, OH (Food Town Kickoff II)		W 36–22	27,700
September 13	Eastern Michigan		Glass Bowl; Toledo, OH		W 38–35	
September 20	at Western Michigan		Waldo Stadium; Kalamazoo, MI		W 23–13	
September 27	Nevada*		Glass Bowl; Toledo, OH		W 31–13	
October 11	at Central Michigan		Kelly/Shorts Stadium; Mount Pleasant, MI		W 41–10	
October 18	Northern Illinois		Glass Bowl; Toledo, OH		W 41–14	22,183
October 25	at Bowling Green	No. 24	Doyt Perry Stadium; Bowling Green, OH (Battle of I-75 Trophy)		W 35–20	
November 1	Miami (OH)	No. 22	Glass Bowl; Toledo, OH		W 35–28	
November 8	at Ball State	No. 18	Ball State Stadium; Muncie, IN		L 3–35	
November 15	Akron		Glass Bowl; Toledo, OH		W 42–10	
November 22	at UCF*		Citrus Bowl; Orlando, FL		L 17–34	15,062
December 5	at Marshall		Marshall University Stadium; Huntington, WV (MAC Championship Game)	ESPN2	L 14–34	28,021
*Non-conference game; Rankings from AP Poll released prior to the game

== Rankings ==
Ranking movements Legend: ██ Increase in ranking ██ Decrease in ranking — = Not ranked
	Week																	
Poll	Pre	1	2	3	4	5	6	7	8	9	10	11	12	13	14	15	16	Final
AP	—	—	—	—	—	—	—	—	—	24	22	18	—	—	—	—	—	—
Coaches	—		—	—	—	—	—	—	—	—	23	20	—	—	—	—	—	—

== Roster ==
1997 Toledo Rockets football team roster
Players
Coaches
Offense

Pos.	#	Name	Class
TE	82	Mike Amrozowicz	Fr
C	53	James Bates	Sr
QB	17	Dan Cole	Fr
C	79	Andy Comer	So
HB	6	Ray Curry	Jr
WR	12	Romain Davis	Sr
LB	44	Romules Durant	Jr
WR	4	Christopher Hall	Sr
RB	32	Kevin Kidd	Sr

Defense

Pos.	#	Name	Class
LB	15	Derrick Beckwith	Jr
CB	31	Jason Bennett	Fr
CB	22	Fabian Burke	Fr
CB	11	Kelly Herndon	Jr
CB	4	Chris Holifield	Sr
CB	42	Maurice Jefferson	Jr
DT	91	Joey Jones	Sr

Special teams

Pos.	#	Name	Class

Head coach

- Gary Pinkel

Coordinators/assistant coaches

- Dave Christensen – Offensive coordinator & offensive line
- David Yost – Quarterbacks and recruiting coordinator
- Brian Jones – Running backs
- Cornell Ford – Wide receivers
- Bruce Walker – Tight end
- Tom Amstutz – Defensive coordinator
- Craig Kuligowski – Defensive line
- Matt Eberflus – outside linebackers
- Phil Parker – Defensive backs
- Grant Elmquist – Graduate assistant
- Dan Murphy – Graduate assistant
- Jim Carmon – Graduate assistant

Legend

- (C) Team captain
- (S) Suspended
- (I) Ineligible
- Injured
- Redshirt

Roster
Last update: December 5, 2023

== After the season ==
=== NFL draft ===
The following Rocket was selected in the 1998 NFL draft following the season.

Round	Pick	Player	Position	NFL club
4	116	Clarence Love	Defensive back	Philadelphia Eagles
