= 1997 MAC Championship Game =

- Conference Championship
Toledo Rockets	Marshall Thundering Herd
(9–2)	(9–2)
14	34
Head coach: Gary Pinkel	Head coach: Bob Pruett
	1	2	3	4	Total
Toledo	0	7	0	7	14
Marshall	3	0	14	17	34
- Date: December 5, 1997
- Season: 1997
- Stadium: Marshall Stadium
- Location: Huntington, West Virginia
- MVP: WR Randy Moss (Marshall)
- Favorite: Marshall by 1
- Attendance: 28,021

United States TV coverage
- Network: ESPN2
- Announcers: Rich Waltz (play-by-play), Todd Christensen (analyst) and Chris Marlowe (sideline)

1997 Mid-American Conference football standings
	Conf.			Overall
Team	W		L	W		L
East Division
Marshall x$	7	–	1	10	–	3
Miami (OH)	6	–	2	8	–	3
Ohio	6	–	2	8	–	3
Bowling Green	3	–	5	3	–	8
Kent State	3	–	5	3	–	8
Akron	2	–	7	2	–	9
West Division
Toledo x	7	–	1	9	–	3
Western Michigan	6	–	2	8	–	3
Ball State	4	–	4	5	–	6
Eastern Michigan	4	–	5	4	–	7
Central Michigan	1	–	7	2	–	9
Northern Illinois	0	–	8	0	–	11
Championship: Marshall 34, Toledo 14
$ – Conference champion; x – Division champion/co-champions

The 1997 MAC Championship Game was the inaugural conference championship game of the Mid-American Conference, and was played on December 5, 1997, at Marshall Stadium, now known as Joan C. Edwards Stadium, in Huntington, West Virginia. The game featured the Marshall Thundering Herd of the East Division, and the Toledo Rockets of the West Division. It snowed the entire game. The Thundering Herd defeated the Rockets 34–14.

== Teams ==
=== Toledo ===
Toledo entered the championship game as West Division champions, having compiled a 9–2 record, 7–1 record in MAC play. The Rockets started the season 8–0 and reaching No. 18 in the AP Poll before losing to Ball State for its only conference loss.

=== Marshall ===
Marshall entered the championship game as East Division champions, having compiled a 9–2 record, 7–1 record in MAC play. After losing its season-opener to West Virginia, the Thundering Herd won nine of its next ten games. This marked Marshall's first season back in the MAC since it was suspended from the conference after the 1968 season.

== Game summary ==
1997 MAC Championship Game

Quarter	1	2	3	4	Total
Toledo	0	7	0	7	14
Marshall	3	0	14	17	34

at Marshall University Stadium • Huntington, West Virginia

- Date: Friday, December 5, 1997
- Game time: 7:30 p.m. EST (6:30 p.m. CST)
- Game weather: Snow • Temperature: 28 °F (−2 °C) • Wind: W 10–15 mph
- Game attendance: 28,021
- TV announcers (ESPN2): Rich Waltz (play-by-play), Todd Christensen (analyst) and Chris Marlowe (sideline)

Game information

First quarter

- (10:51) MRSH – Billy Malashevich 22 yard field goal (Marshall 3–0)

Second quarter

- (13:16) TOL – Ray Curry 56 yard pass from Chris Wallace, Chris Merrick kick (Toledo 7–3)

Third quarter

- (6:46) MRSH – Randy Moss 4 yard pass from Chad Pennington, Billy Malashevich kick (Marshall 10–7)
- (3:48) MRSH – Randy Moss 86 yard pass from Chad Pennington, Billy Malashevich kick (Marshall 17–7)

Fourth quarter

- (10:42) MRSH – Billy Malashevich 25 yard field goal (Marshall 20–7)
- (7:01) MRSH – Randy Moss 20 yard pass from Chad Pennington, Billy Malashevich kick (Marshall 27–7)
- (6:24) MRSH – Doug Chapman 5 yard rush, Billy Malashevich kick (Marshall 34–7)
- (3:02) TOL – Mel Long Jr. 33 yard pass from Chris Wallace, Chris Merrick kick (Marshall 34–14)

=== Statistics ===
Statistics	TOL	MRSH
First downs	16	24
Plays–yards	70–319	63–442
Rushes–yards	42–73	29–120
Passing yards	246	322
Passing: comp–att–int	12–28–1	20–34–1
Time of possession	29:44	30:16

Team	Category	Player	Statistics
Toledo	Passing	Chris Wallace	12/28, 246 yards, 2 TD, 1 INT
Toledo	Rushing	Dwayne Harris	30 carries, 105 yards
Toledo	Receiving	Brock Kreitzburg	3 receptions, 65 yards
Marshall	Passing	Chad Pennington	20/34, 322 yards, 3 TD, 1 INT
Marshall	Rushing	Doug Chapman	20 carries, 115 yards, 1 TD
Marshall	Receiving	Randy Moss	7 receptions, 170 yards, 3 TD
