= 1997–98 NCAA football bowl games =

College football postseason game series

- Season: 1997
- Number of bowls: 20
- Bowl games: December 20, 1997 – January 2, 1998
- National Championship: Orange Bowl
- Location of Championship: Pro Player Stadium; Miami Gardens, FL
- Champions: Michigan (AP); Nebraska (Coaches)
Bowl record by conference
Conference	Bowls	Record	Final AP poll
Big Ten	7	2–5 (0.286)	4
SEC	6	5–1 (0.833)	6
Pac-10	6	5–1 (0.833)	4
Big 12	5	2–3 (0.400)	5
ACC	4	3–1 (0.750)	3
Big East	4	0–4 (0.000)	1
WAC	3	1–2 (0.333)	1
CUSA	2	2–0 (1.000)	1
Big West	1	0–1 (0.000)	0
MAC	1	0–1 (0.000)	0

The 1997–98 NCAA football bowl games concluded the 1997 NCAA Division I-A football season. In the third and final year of the Bowl Alliance era, Nebraska defeated Tennessee in the 1998 Orange Bowl, designated as the Bowl Alliance national championship for the 1997 season. AP-No. 1 ranked Michigan defeated Washington State in the 1998 Rose Bowl, which was not a part of the Bowl Alliance. Michigan was awarded the national championship by the AP Poll and Nebraska by the Coaches Poll.

A total of 20 bowl games were played between December 20, 1997, and January 2, 1998, by 40 bowl-eligible teams. Two new bowl games were added this year: the Motor City Bowl (now known as the Little Caesars Pizza Bowl), and the Humanitarian Bowl (now known as the Famous Idaho Potato Bowl).

== Non-Bowl Alliance bowls ==
Date	Time	Game	Site	Result	Ref.
Dec 20	6:00 PM	Las Vegas Bowl	Sam Boyd Stadium; Las Vegas, NV	Oregon 41, No. 23 Air Force 13	
Dec 25	3:30 PM	Aloha Bowl	Aloha Stadium; Honolulu, HI	No. 21 Washington 51, No. 25 Michigan State 23	
Dec 26	8:00 PM	Motor City Bowl	Pontiac Silverdome; Pontiac, MI	Ole Miss 34, Marshall 31	
Dec 27	2:30 PM	Insight.com Bowl	Arizona Stadium; Tucson, AZ	Arizona 20, New Mexico 14	
Dec 28	8:00 PM	Independence Bowl	Independence Stadium; Shreveport, LA	No. 15 LSU 27, Notre Dame 9	
Dec 29	3:30 PM	Humanitarian Bowl	Bronco Stadium; Boise, ID	Cincinnati 35, Utah State 19	
Dec 29	7:30 PM	Carquest Bowl	Pro Player Stadium; Miami Gardens, FL	Georgia Tech 35, West Virginia 30	
Dec 29	8:00 PM	Holiday Bowl	Qualcomm Stadium; San Diego, CA	No. 18 Colorado State 35, No. 19 Missouri 24	
Dec 30	8:00 PM	Alamo Bowl	Alamodome; San Antonio, TX	No. 17 Purdue 33, No. 24 Oklahoma State 20	
Dec 31	2:00 PM	Sun Bowl	Sun Bowl; El Paso, TX	No. 16 Arizona State 17, Iowa 7	
Dec 31	3:30 PM	Liberty Bowl	Liberty Bowl Memorial Stadium; Memphis, TN	No. 22 Southern Miss 41, Pittsburgh 7	
Jan 1	11:00 AM	Outback Bowl	Raymond James Stadium; Tampa, FL	No. 12 Georgia 33, Wisconsin 6	
Jan 1	12:30 PM	Gator Bowl	Alltel Stadium; Jacksonville, FL	No. 7 North Carolina 42, Virginia Tech 3	
Jan 1	1:00 PM	Florida Citrus Bowl	Florida Citrus Bowl; Orlando, FL	No. 6 Florida 21, No. 11 Penn State 6	
Jan 1	1:30 PM	Cotton Bowl Classic	Cotton Bowl; Dallas, TX	No. 5 UCLA 29, No. 20 Texas A&M 23	
Jan 1	5:00 PM	Rose Bowl	Rose Bowl; Pasadena, CA	No. 1 Michigan 21, No. 8 Washington State 16	
Jan 2	3:00 PM	Peach Bowl	Georgia Dome; Atlanta, GA	No. 13 Auburn 21, Clemson 17	
Rankings from AP Poll released prior to the game. All times are in Eastern Time.

== Bowl Alliance bowls ==
Date	Time	Game	Site	Result	Ref.
Dec 31	7:00 PM	Fiesta Bowl	Sun Devil Stadium; Tempe, AZ	No. 10 Kansas State 35, No. 14 Syracuse 18	
Jan 1	8:00 PM	Sugar Bowl	Louisiana Superdome; New Orleans, LA	No. 4 Florida State 31, No. 9 Ohio State 14	
Jan 2	8:00 PM	Orange Bowl (championship game)	Pro Player Stadium; Miami Gardens, FL	No. 2 Nebraska 42, No. 3 Tennessee 17	
Rankings from AP Poll released prior to the game. All times are in Eastern Time.
