= 1997 Big Ten Conference football season =

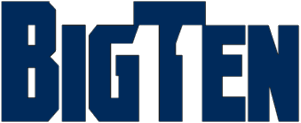
- League: NCAA Division I-A
- Sport: football
- Teams: 11
- Top draft pick: Charles Woodson
- Champion: Michigan
- Runners-up: Ohio State
- Season MVP: Charles Woodson
- Top scorer: Curtis Enis

Football seasons

1997 Big Ten Conference football standings
	Conf.			Overall
Team	W		L	W		L
No. 1 Michigan $	8	–	0	12	–	0
No. 12 Ohio State	6	–	2	10	–	3
No. 16 Penn State	6	–	2	9	–	3
No. 15 Purdue	6	–	2	9	–	3
Wisconsin	5	–	3	8	–	5
Iowa	4	–	4	7	–	5
Michigan State	4	–	4	7	–	5
Northwestern	3	–	5	5	–	7
Minnesota	1	–	7	3	–	9
Indiana	1	–	7	2	–	9
Illinois	0	–	8	0	–	11
$ – Conference champion; Rankings from AP Poll

The 1997 Big Ten Conference football season was the 102nd season of college football played by the member schools of the Big Ten Conference and was a part of the 1997 NCAA Division I-A football season.

The 1997 Big Ten champion was Michigan. Led by head coach Lloyd Carr, Michigan compiled a perfect 12–0 record, defeated Washington State in the 1998 Rose Bowl, and was declared the national champion in the AP Poll. Michigan cornerback Charles Woodson became the first primarily defensive player to win the Heisman Trophy.

Ohio State finished in a tie for second place with a 10–3 record and lost to Florida State in the 1998 Sugar Bowl. Ohio State's defense was led by consensus All-American linebacker Andy Katzenmoyer.

Penn State also tied for second place and was led by Curtis Enis who rushed for 1,363 yards and led the conference with 120 points scored. The Nittany Lions began the 1997 season ranked No. 1 in the AP Poll and ended it with a loss to Florida in the 1998 Florida Citrus Bowl.

Purdue also tied for second place under first-year head coach Joe Tiller who was named Big Ten Coach of the Year. Purdue quarterback Billy Dicken led the conference with 3,136 passing yards, and wide receiver Brian Alford led the conference with 1,228 receiving yards.

Iowa was ranked as high as No. 4 in the AP Poll during the season and fielded the conference's most potent offensive with an average of 34.3 points scored per game. Iowa running back Tavian Banks led the conference with 1,639 rushing yards.

== Season overview ==
=== Results and team statistics ===
Conf. Rank	Team	Head coach	AP final	AP high	Overall record	Conf. record	PPG	PAG
1	Michigan	Lloyd Carr	#1	#1	12–0	8–0	26.8	9.5
2 (tie)	Ohio State	John Cooper	#12	#4	10–3	6–2	30.3	13.1
2 (tie)	Penn State	Joe Paterno	#16	#1	9–3	6–2	30.5	21.2
2 (tie)	Purdue	Joe Tiller	#15	#15	9–3	6–2	33.0	22.3
5	Wisconsin	Barry Alvarez	NR	#23	8–5	5–3	22.4	23.5
6 (tie)	Iowa	Hayden Fry	#14	#4	7–5	4–4	34.3	13.3
6 (tie)	Michigan State	Nick Saban	NR	#11	7–5	4–4	28.5	19.8
8	Northwestern	Gary Barnett	NR	#21	5–7	3–5	20.3	24.0
9 (tie)	Minnesota	Glen Mason	NR	NR	3–9	1–7	19.8	27.8
9 (tie)	Indiana	Cam Cameron	NR	NR	2–9	1–7	10.9	32.6
11	Illinois	Ron Turner	NR	NR	0–11	0–8	10.8	33.5

Key
AP final = Team's rank in the final AP Poll of the 1997 season
AP high = Team's highest rank in the AP Poll throughout the 1997 season
PPG = Average of points scored per game
PAG = Average of points allowed per game

=== Bowl games ===
Seven Big Ten teams played in bowl games as follows:

- Michigan defeated Washington State, 21-16, in the 1998 Rose Bowl
- Penn State lost to Florida, 21-6, in the 1998 Florida Citrus Bowl
- Ohio State lost to Florida State, 31-14, in the 1998 Sugar Bowl
- Purdue defeated Oklahoma State, 33-20, in the 1997 Alamo Bowl
- Wisconsin lost to Georgia, 33-6, in the 1998 Outback Bowl
- Iowa lost to Arizona State, 17-7, in the 1997 Sun Bowl
- Michigan State lost to Washington, 51-23, in the 1997 Aloha Bowl

== Statistical leaders ==
The Big Ten's individual statistical leaders include the following:

=== Passing yards ===
1. Billy Dicken, Purdue (3,136)
2. Mike McQueary, Penn State (2,211)
3. Jay Rodgers, Indiana (2,156)
4. Brian Griese, Michigan 2042
5. Todd Schultz, Michigan State (2,003)

=== Pass efficiency rating ===
1. Joe Germaine, Ohio State (151.9)
2. Mike McQueary, Penn State (145.0)
3. Brian Griese, Michigan (138.2)
4. Billy Dicken, Purdue (128.9)
5. Todd Schultz, Michigan State (124.0)

=== Rushing yards ===
1. Tavian Banks, Iowa (1,639)
2. Ron Dayne, Wisconsin (1,457)
3. Curtis Enis, Penn State (1,363)
4. Sedrick Irvin, Michigan State (1,270)
5. Robert Holcombe, Illinois (1,253)

=== Rushing yards per attempt ===
1. Kendall Matthews, Purdue (7.1)
2. Tavian Banks, Iowa (6.7)
3. Curtis Enis, Penn State (6.0)
4. Michael Wiley, Ohio State (5.6)
5. Ron Dayne, Wisconsin (5.5)

=== Receiving yards ===
1. Brian Alford, Purdue (1,228)
2. Dee Miller, Ohio State (981)
3. David Boston, Ohio State (970)
4. Tutu Atwell, Minnesota (924)
5. Brian Musso, Northwestern (865)

=== Receiving yards per reception ===
1. Damon Gibson, Iowa (22.4)
2. Joe Jurevicius, Penn State (20.9)
3. Tony Simmons, Wisconsin (19.8)
4. Brian Alford, Purdue (19.5)
5. O. J. Conner, Indiana (18.6)

=== Total yards ===
1. Billy Dicken, Purdue (3,487)
2. Mike McQueary, Penn State (2,184)
3. Mike Samuel, Wisconsin (2,138)
4. Brian Griese, Michigan (2,049)
5. Jay Rodgers, Indiana (2,035)

=== Scoring ===
1. Curtis Enis, Penn State (120)
2. Tavian Banks, Iowa (114)
3. Dan Stultz, Ohio State (92)
4. Ron Dayne, Wisconsin (90)
5. David Boston, Ohio State (84)
5. Sedrick Irvin, Michigan State (84)

== All-conference players ==
Seventeen players were selected as first-team All-Big Ten players by both the coaches and the media:

- Tavian Banks, running back, Iowa (Coaches-1; Media-1)
- Curtis Enis, running back, Penn State (Coaches-1; Media-1)
- Zach Adami, center, Michigan (Coaches-1; Media-1)
- Phil Ostrowski, offensive guard, Penn State (Coaches-1; Media-1)
- Flozell Adams, offensive tackle, Michigan State (Coaches-1; Media-1)
- Jerame Tuman, tight end, Michigan (Coaches-1; Media-1)
- Brian Alford, wide receiver, Purdue (Coaches-1; Media-1)
- David Boston, wide receiver, Ohio State (Coaches-1; Media-1)
- Casey Dailey, defensive lineman, Northwestern (Coaches-1; Media-1)
- Jared DeVries, defensive lineman, Iowa (Coaches-1; Media-1)
- Glen Steele, defensive lineman, Michigan (Coaches-1; Media-1)
- Lamanzer Williams, defensive lineman, Minnesota (Coaches-1; Media-1)
- Barry Gardner, linebacker, Northwestern (Coaches-1; Media-1)
- Andy Katzenmoyer, linebacker, Ohio State (Coaches-1; Media-1)
- Marcus Ray, defensive back, Michigan (Coaches-1; Media-1)
- Antoine Winfield, defensive back, Ohio State (Coaches-1; Media-1)
- Charles Woodson, defensive back, Michigan (Coaches-1; Media-1)

== All-Americans ==
Four Big Ten players were selected as consensus All-Americans:

- Curtis Enis, running back, Penn State (Associated Press [AP], Football Writers Association of America [FWAA], Walter Camp Football Foundation [WC])
- Andy Katzenmoyer, linebacker, Ohio State (AP, American Football Coaches Association [AFCA], FWAA, WC, Football News [FN])
- Charles Woodson, Michigan (AP, AFCA, FWAA, WC, The Sporting News [TSN], FN)
- Tim Dwight, all-purpose player, Iowa (AP, AFCA, FWAA, TSN)

Other Big Ten players receiving first-team honors were:

- Ron Dayne, running back, Wisconsin (FN)
- Brian Alford, wide receiver, Purdue (FN)
- Jerame Tuman, tight end, Michigan (FN)
- Flozell Adams, offensive linemen, Michigan State (WC)
- Rob Murphy, offensive lineman, Ohio State (FN)
- Glen Steele, defensive lineman, Michigan (AFCA)
- Lamanzer Williams, Minnesota (FWAA)
- Antoine Winfield, defensive back, Ohio State (AFCA, FWAA)

== 1998 NFL draft ==
The 1998 NFL draft was held in April 1998. The following Big Ten players were selected in the first four rounds of the draft:

Name	Position	Team	Round	Overall pick
Charles Woodson	Defensive back	Michigan	1	4
Curtis Enis	Running back	Penn State	1	5
Robert Holcombe	Fullback	Illinois	2	37
Flozell Adams	Offensive tackle	Michigan State	2	38
Tony Simmons	Wide receiver	Wisconsin	2	52
Joe Jurevicius	Wide receiver	Penn State	2	55
Brian Alford	Wide receiver	Purdue	3	70
Mike Goff	Offensive tackle	Iowa	3	78
Chris Floyd	Fullback	Michigan	3	81
Brian Griese	Quarterback	Michigan	3	91
Tavian Banks	Running back	Iowa	4	101
Glen Steele	Defensive tackle	Michigan	4	105
Donald Hayes	Wide receiver	Wisconsin	4	106
Tim Dwight	Wide receiver	Iowa	4	114
