= 1997 Iowa Hawkeyes football team =

American college football season

1997 Iowa Hawkeyes football

Sun Bowl, L 7–17 vs. Arizona State
- Conference: Big Ten Conference
- Record: 7–5 (4–4 Big Ten)
- Head coach: Hayden Fry (19th season)
- Offensive coordinator: Don Patterson (6th season)
- Offensive scheme: Pro-style
- Defensive coordinator: Bob Elliott (2nd season)
- Base defense: 3–4
- MVPs: Tavian Banks; Kerry Cooks; Jared DeVries; Tim Dwight
- Captains: Kerry Cooks; Tim Dwight; Jon LaFleur; Matt Sherman
- Home stadium: Kinnick Stadium

1997 Big Ten Conference football standings
	Conf.			Overall
Team	W		L	W		L
No. 1 Michigan $	8	–	0	12	–	0
No. 12 Ohio State	6	–	2	10	–	3
No. 16 Penn State	6	–	2	9	–	3
No. 15 Purdue	6	–	2	9	–	3
Wisconsin	5	–	3	8	–	5
Iowa	4	–	4	7	–	5
Michigan State	4	–	4	7	–	5
Northwestern	3	–	5	5	–	7
Minnesota	1	–	7	3	–	9
Indiana	1	–	7	2	–	9
Illinois	0	–	8	0	–	11
$ – Conference champion; Rankings from AP Poll

The 1997 Iowa Hawkeyes football team represented the University of Iowa as a member of the Big Ten Conference during the 1997 NCAA Division I-A football season. Led by 19th-year head coach Hayden Fry, the Hawkeyes compiled an overall record of 7–5 with a mark of 4–4 in conference play, tying for sixth place in the Big Ten. Iowa was invited to the Sun Bowl, where the Hawkeyes lost to Arizona State. The team played home games at Kinnick Stadium in Iowa City, Iowa.

== Schedule ==
Date	Time	Opponent	Rank	Site	TV	Result	Attendance
September 6	11:30 am	Northern Iowa*	No. 20	Kinnick Stadium; Iowa City, IA		W 66–0	66,325
September 13	1:00 pm	Tulsa*	No. 18	Kinnick Stadium; Iowa City, IA		W 54–16	64,893
September 20	2:30 pm	at Iowa State*	No. 13	Jack Trice Stadium; Ames, IA (rivalry)	ABC	W 63–20	50,066
September 27	11:30 am	Illinois	No. 11	Kinnick Stadium; Iowa City, IA	ESPN2	W 38–10	70,397
October 4	2:30 pm	at No. 7 Ohio State	No. 11	Ohio Stadium; Columbus, OH (College GameDay)	ABC	L 7–23	92,536
October 18	11:30 am	at No. 5 Michigan	No. 15	Michigan Stadium; Ann Arbor, MI	ESPN	L 24–28	106,505
October 25	11:00 am	Indiana^{†}	No. 18	Kinnick Stadium; Iowa City, IA	ESPN Plus	W 62–0	70,397
November 1	11:30 am	No. 18 Purdue	No. 15	Kinnick Stadium; Iowa City, IA	ESPN2	W 35–17	70,397
November 8	11:30 am	at Wisconsin	No. 12	Camp Randall Stadium; Madison, WI (rivalry)	ESPN	L 10–13	79,864
November 15	11:30 am	at Northwestern	No. 22	Ryan Field; Evanston, IL	ESPN2	L 14–15	40,838
November 22	1:00 pm	Minnesota		Kinnick Stadium; Iowa City, IA (rivalry)		W 31–0	64,591
December 31	1:30 pm	vs. No. 16 Arizona State*		Sun Bowl; El Paso, TX (Sun Bowl)	CBS	L 7–17	49,104
*Non-conference game; ^{†}Homecoming; Rankings from AP Poll released prior to the game; All times are in Central time; Source:

== Rankings ==
Ranking movements Legend: ██ Increase in ranking ██ Decrease in ranking RV = Received votes
	Week																	
Poll	Pre	1	2	3	4	5	6	7	8	9	10	11	12	13	14	15	16	Final
AP	21	21	20	18	13	11	11	17	15	18	15	12	22	RV	RV	RV	RV	RV
Coaches	20		19	17	13	9	8	16	15	19	16	14	22	RV	RV	RV	RV	RV

== Game summaries ==
=== Northern Iowa ===
Northern Iowa at #19 Iowa

Team	1	2	3	4	Total
Panthers	0	0	0	0	0
• Hawkeyes	10	28	7	21	66

- Date: September 6
- Location: Kinnick Stadium
  Iowa City, IA
- Game attendance: 66,325
- Sources: Box score and Game recap

Scoring summary
1	14:40	Iowa	Tavian Banks 63-yard run (Zach Bromert kick)	Iowa 7–0
1	7:53	Iowa	Zach Bromert 40-yard field goal	Iowa 10–0
2	14:53	Iowa	Tavian Banks 40-yard run (Zach Bromert kick)	Iowa 17–0
2	14:29	Iowa	Tim Dwight 27-yard pass from Matt Sherman (Zach Bromert kick)	Iowa 24–0
2	10:56	Iowa	Tavian Banks 6-yard pass from Matt Sherman (Zach Bromert kick)	Iowa 31–0
2	2:25	Iowa	Damon Gibson 65-yard pass from Matt Sherman (Zach Bromert kick)	Iowa 38–0
3	6:14	Iowa	Rob Thein 6-yard run (Zach Bromert kick)	Iowa 45–0
4	14:55	Iowa	Richard Willcock 26-yard pass from Randy Reiners (Greg McLaughlin kick)	Iowa 52–0
4	7:02	Iowa	Richard Carter 27-yard pass from Randy Reiners (Zach Bromert kick)	Iowa 59–0
4	1:47	Iowa	Henry Pollio 1-yard run (Zach Bromert kick)	Iowa 66–0

The Hawkeyes dominated on both sides of the ball as they gave the crowd an opening-game victory.

=== Tulsa ===
Tulsa at #17 Iowa

Team	1	2	3	4	Total
Golden Hurricane	0	10	6	0	16
• Hawkeyes	23	7	7	17	54

- Date: September 13
- Location: Kinnick Stadium
  Iowa City, IA
- Game attendance: 64,893
- Sources: Box score and Game recap

Scoring summary
1	9:55	Iowa	Tavian Banks 71-yard run (Zach Bromert kick)	Iowa 7–0
1	4:45	Iowa	Zach Bromert 27-yard field goal	Iowa 10–0
1	4:29	Iowa	Tavian Banks 14-yard run (Zach Bromert kick)	Iowa 17–0
2	0:37	Iowa	Tavian Banks 14-yard run (PAT failed)	Iowa 23–0
2	7:55	Tulsa	Charlie Higgins 13-yard pass from John Fitzgerald (James Anderson kick)	Iowa 23–7
2	3:20	Tulsa	James Anderson 32-yard field goal	Iowa 23–10
2	0:00	Iowa	Tim Dwight 35-yard pass from Matt Sherman (Zach Bromert kick)	Iowa 30–10
3	9:05	Tulsa	Charlie Higgins 1-yard run (two-point conversion failed)	Iowa 30–16
3	4:28	Iowa	Tavian Banks 23-yard run (Zach Bromert kick)	Iowa 37–16
4	14:24	Iowa	Rob Thein 9-yard pass from Matt Sherman (Zach Bromert kick)	Iowa 44–16
4	9:31	Iowa	Zach Bromert 34-yard field goal	Iowa 47–16
4	9:11	Iowa	Richard Willcock 27-yard pass from Randy Reiners (Zach Bromert kick)	Iowa 54–16

Avenging an upset loss from the previous season, the Hawkeyes rolled up over 600 yards of total offense for the second time in as many games. Senior running back Tavian Banks rushed for a school record 314 yards and a school record-tying 4 touchdowns.

=== Iowa State ===
#13 Iowa at Iowa State
Battle for the Cy-Hawk Trophy

Team	1	2	3	4	Total
• Hawkeyes	14	21	21	7	63
Cyclones	0	6	7	7	20

- Date: September 20
- Location: Jack Trice Stadium
  Ames, IA
- Game start: 2:30 pm CDT
- Elapsed time: 3:35
- Game attendance: 50,066
- Game weather: 58 °F (14 °C), Mostly sunny, Wind NNW 10–15 mph (16–24 km/h)
- Referee: Jim Kemerling
- Sources: Box score Archived 2020-01-07 at the Wayback Machine

Scoring summary
1	14:02	Iowa	Tavian Banks 82-yard run (Zach Bromert kick)	Iowa 7–0
1	2:24	Iowa	Tavian Banks 8-yard run (Zach Bromert kick)	Iowa 14–0
2	9:53	Iowa	Tavian Banks 1-yard run (Zach Bromert kick)	Iowa 21–0
2	6:15	Iowa	Tim Dwight 41-yard pass from Matt Sherman (Zach Bromert kick)	Iowa 28–0
2	3:38	Iowa	Tim Dwight 29-yard pass from Matt Sherman (Zach Bromert kick)	Iowa 35–0
2	1:18	ISU	Andy Stensrud 11-yard pass from Todd Bandhauer (PAT failed)	Iowa 35–6
3	11:46	Iowa	Tim Dwight 33-yard pass from Matt Sherman (Zach Bromert kick)	Iowa 42–6
3	10:41	Iowa	Tavian Banks 4-yard run (Zach Bromert kick)	Iowa 49–6
3	6:45	ISU	Andy Stensrud 5-yard pass from Todd Bandhauer (Jamie Kohl kick)	Iowa 49–13
3	4:00	Iowa	Kerry Cooks 30-yard interception return (Zach Bromert kick)	Iowa 56–13
4	6:15	ISU	Tyrone Watley 30-yard pass from Todd Bandhauer (Jamie Kohl kick)	Iowa 56–20
4	4:32	Iowa	Damon Gibson 58-yard pass from Randy Reiners (Zach Bromert kick)	Iowa 63–20

The Hawkeyes won against the rival Cyclones for the 15th consecutive year. Tavian Banks had four rushing touchdowns for the second week in a row and Tim Dwight hauled in three touchdown receptions as the Hawkeyes rolled up 575 yards of total offense.

=== Illinois ===
Illinois at #9 Iowa

Team	1	2	3	4	Total
Fighting Illini	0	3	0	7	10
• Hawkeyes	7	17	7	7	38

- Date: September 27
- Location: Kinnick Stadium
  Iowa City, IA
- Game attendance: 70,397
- Sources: Box score and Game recap

Scoring summary
1	5:22	Iowa	Tavian Banks 2-yard run (Zach Bromert kick)	Iowa 7–0
2	11:52	Illinois	Neil Rackers 37-yard field goal	Iowa 7–3
2	8:08	Iowa	Tony Collins 61-yard punt return (Zach Bromert kick)	Iowa 14–3
2	1:47	Iowa	Zach Bromert 40-yard field goal	Iowa 17–3
2	0:05	Iowa	Damon Gibson 43-yard pass from Matt Sherman (Zach Bromert kick)	Iowa 24–3
3	7:17	Iowa	Tavian Banks 31-yard run (Zach Bromert kick)	Iowa 31–3
4	8:59	Illinois	George McDonald-Ashford 28-yard pass from Tim Lavery (Neil Rackers kick)	Iowa 31–10
4	3:25	Iowa	Tony Collins 16-yard pass from Matt Sherman (Zach Bromert kick)	Iowa 38–10

Tavian Banks ran for two more touchdowns to push his total to 12 rushing touchdowns after 4 games. Tony Collins also scored twice, the first on a 61-yard punt return and the other on a 16-yard pass from Matt Sherman.

=== Ohio State ===
#8 Iowa at #7 Ohio State

Team	1	2	3	4	Total
Hawkeyes	0	0	7	0	7
• Buckeyes	0	10	6	7	23

- Date: October 4
- Location: Ohio Stadium
  Columbus, OH
- Game attendance: 92,536
- Television network: ABC
- Sources: Box score and Game recap

Scoring summary
2	13:11	OSU	Dan Stultz 36-yard field goal	OSU 3–0
2	0:38	OSU	Michael Wiley 1-yard run	OSU 10–0
3	10:35	OSU	David Boston 6-yard pass from Stanley Jackson (PAT failed)	OSU 16–0
3	7:39	Iowa	Austin Wheatley 4-yard pass from Matt Sherman (Zach Bromert kick)	OSU 16–7
4	3:13	OSU	Michael Wiley 10-yard run (Dan Stultz kick)	OSU 23–7

College GameDay was in Columbus for this matchup.

=== Michigan ===
#15 Iowa at #5 Michigan

Team	1	2	3	4	Total
Hawkeyes	0	21	3	0	24
• Wolverines	0	7	14	7	28

- Date: October 18
- Location: Michigan Stadium
  Ann Arbor, MI
- Game attendance: 106,505
- Referee: Steve Newman
- TV announcers (ESPN): Dave Barnett, Bill Curry, Dave Ryan
- Sources: Box score and Game recap

Scoring summary
2	13:29	Iowa	Tavian Banks 53-yard run (Zach Bromert kick)	Iowa 7–0
2	4:53	Mich	Tai Streets 15-yard pass from Brian Griese (Kraig Baker kick)	Tied 7–7
2	2:27	Iowa	Michael Burger 1-yard run (kick failed)	Iowa 13–7
2	0:00	Iowa	Tim Dwight 61-yard punt return (Matt Sherman to Chris Knipper pass)	Iowa 21–7
3	11:06	Mich	Russell Shaw 10-yard pass from Brian Griese (Kraig Baker kick)	Iowa 21–14
3	3:19	Mich	Brian Griese 1-yard run (Kraig Baker kick)	Tied 21–21
3	0:25	Iowa	Zach Bromert 38-yard field goal	Iowa 24–21
4	2:55	Mich	Jerame Tuman 2-yard pass from Brian Griese (Kraig Baker kick)	Mich 28–24

Playing their second straight game against a Top 10 team on the road, the Hawkeyes put together a very strong first half. On the final play before the break, Michigan punted to All-American Tim Dwight who took it 61 yards to the house for a 21-7 halftime lead. The Wolverines clamped down in the second half, outscoring Iowa 21–3. Michigan would go on to finish 12-0 and claim the AP National Championship.

=== Indiana ===
Indiana at #19 Iowa

Team	1	2	3	4	Total
Hoosiers	0	0	0	0	0
• Hawkeyes	7	14	21	20	62

- Date: October 25
- Location: Kinnick Stadium
  Iowa City, IA
- Game attendance: 70,397
- TV announcers (ESPN Plus): Wayne Larrivee
- Sources: Box score and Game recap

Scoring summary
1	10:15	Iowa	Tavian Banks 19-yard pass from Randy Reiners (Zach Bromert kick)	Iowa 7–0
2	6:35	Iowa	Tim Dwight 29-yard pass from Randy Reiners (Zach Bromert kick)	Iowa 14–0
2	4:42	Iowa	Damon Gibson 64-yard pass from Tim Dwight (Zach Bromert kick)	Iowa 21–0
3	11:24	Iowa	Matt Bowen 70-yard interception return (Zach Bromert kick)	Iowa 28–0
3	4:10	Iowa	Tim Dwight 92-yard punt return (Zach Bromert kick)	Iowa 35–0
3	1:18	Iowa	Randy Reiners 6-yard run (Zach Bromert kick)	Iowa 42–0
4	11:32	Iowa	Tavian Banks 1-yard run (Zach Bromert kick)	Iowa 49–0
4	1:48	Iowa	J.P. Lange 59-yard interception return (Zach Bromert kick)	Iowa 56–0
4	0:07	Iowa	Rob Thein 30-yard run (PAT failed)	Iowa 62–0

The Hawkeyes scored 60+ points for the third time of the 1997 season. The win was highlighted by an electrifying 92-yard punt return for a TD by Tim Dwight. Dwight also caught a 29-yard touchdown from Randy Reiners, who was making his first start at QB, and threw a 64-yard touchdown pass to Damon Gibson. The defense did plenty as well. In addition to pitching a shutout, Matt Bowen and J.P. Lange each added long interception returns for touchdowns.

=== Purdue ===
#18 Purdue at #16 Iowa

Team	1	2	3	4	Total
Boilermakers	10	7	0	0	17
• Hawkeyes	0	14	21	0	35

- Date: November 1
- Location: Kinnick Stadium
  Iowa City, IA
- Game start: 11:35 am CDT
- Elapsed time: 3:30
- Game attendance: 70,397
- Game weather: 47 °F (8 °C), Overcast, Wind NW 15–20 mph (24–32 km/h)
- Referee: J. Kemerling
- Television network: ESPN2
- Sources: Box score Archived 2020-01-07 at the Wayback Machine

Scoring summary
1	2:32	Purdue	Shane Ryan 19-yard field goal	Purdue 3–0
1	0:00	Purdue	Brian Alford 77-yard pass from Billy Dicken (Shane Ryan kick)	Purdue 10–0
2	13:50	Iowa	Rob Thein 31-yard pass from Randy Reiners (Zach Bromert kick)	Purdue 10–7
2	12:17	Purdue	Billy Dicken 1-yard run (Shane Ryan kick)	Purdue 17–7
2	0:32	Iowa	Rob Thein 9-yard pass from Randy Reiners (Zach Bromert kick)	Purdue 17–14
3	12:46	Iowa	Tavian Banks 16-yard run (Zach Bromert kick)	Iowa 21–17
3	8:46	Iowa	Michael Burger 1-yard run (Zach Bromert kick)	Iowa 28–17
3	1:25	Iowa	Rob Thein 5-yard run (Zach Bromert kick)	Iowa 35–17

=== Wisconsin ===
#12 Iowa at Wisconsin

Team	1	2	3	4	Total
Hawkeyes	0	0	7	3	10
• Badgers	0	13	0	0	13

- Date: November 8
- Location: Camp Randall Stadium
  Madison, WI
- Game start: 11:30 am CST
- Elapsed time: 3:07
- Game attendance: 79,864
- Game weather: High 40s°F, Party cloudy, Variable wind
- Referee: Bill Lemonnier
- Television network: ESPN
- Sources: Box score Archived 2020-01-07 at the Wayback Machine

Scoring summary
2	12:37	Wisc	Matt Davenport 37-yard field goal	Wis 3–0
2	11:42	Wis	Eddie Faulkner 4-yard run (Matt Davenport kick)	Wis 10–0
2	0:04	Wis	Matt Davenport 43-yard field goal	Wis 13–0
3	1:09	Iowa	Tim Dwight 19-yard pass from Randy Reiners (Zach Bromert kick)	Wis 13–7
4	8:01	Iowa	Zach Bromert 41-yard field goal	Wis 13–10

The Badgers defeated the Hawkeyes for the first time since the 1976 season.

=== Northwestern ===
#22 Iowa at Northwestern

Team	1	2	3	4	Total
Hawkeyes	7	7	0	0	14
• Wildcats	0	7	8	0	15

- Date: November 15
- Location: Ryan Field
  Evanston, IL
- Game start: 11:35 am CST
- Elapsed time: 3:05
- Game attendance: 40,838
- Game weather: 31 °F (−1 °C), Snow, Wind SE 15–25 mph (24–40 km/h)
- Referee: D. Witvoet
- Television network: ESPN2
- Sources: Box score Archived January 7, 2020, at the Wayback Machine Archived 2020-01-07 at the Wayback Machine

Scoring summary
1	9:17	Iowa	Tavian Banks 46-yard run (Zach Bromert kick)	Iowa 7–0
2	11:42	NW	Brian Musso 31-yard pass from Tim Hughes (Brian Gowins kick)	Tied 7–7
2	1:41	Iowa	Tavian Banks 1-yard run (Zach Bromert kick)	Iowa 14–7
3	13:03	NW	Safety	Iowa 14–9
3	10:14	NW	Brian Musso 40-yard pass from Tim Hughes (two-point conversion failed)	NW 15–14

Four missed field goals plagued the Hawkeyes in a road loss to Northwestern.

=== Minnesota ===
Minnesota at Iowa
Battle for Floyd of Rosedale

Team	1	2	3	4	Total
Golden Gophers	0	0	0	0	0
• Hawkeyes	3	14	7	7	31

- Date: November 22
- Location: Kinnick Stadium
  Iowa City, IA
- Game start: 1:05 pm CST
- Elapsed time: 2:45
- Game attendance: 64,591
- Game weather: 35 °F (2 °C), Cloudy, Wind W 14 mph (23 km/h)
- Referee: J. Teitz
- Sources: Box score Archived 2020-01-07 at the Wayback Machine

Scoring summary
1	9:02	Iowa	Zach Bromert 20-yard field goal	Iowa 3–0
2	11:08	Iowa	Tim Dwight 1-yard pass from Randy Reiners (Zach Bromert kick)	Iowa 10–0
2	2:01	Iowa	Chris Knipper 1-yard pass from Randy Reiners (Zach Bromert kick)	Iowa 17–0
3	0:49	Iowa	Tim Dwight 44-yard punt return (Zach Bromert kick)	Iowa 24–0
4	4:10	Iowa	Scott Mullen 7-yard run (Zach Bromert kick)	Iowa 31–0

After consecutive disappointing road losses, the Hawkeyes returned to Kinnick Stadium and closed the regular season with a decisive win over the Minnesota Golden Gophers on Senior Day. Late in the 3rd Quarter, Tim Dwight returned a punt 44 yards for a touchdown, giving him the Big Ten record for punt return touchdowns in a career (the record stood until 2006). The Iowa defense posted its third shutout in six home games during the 1997 season.

=== Vs. No. 17 Arizona State (Sun Bowl) ===
Iowa vs. #17 Arizona State

Team	1	2	3	4	Total
Hawkeyes	0	0	0	7	7
• Sun Devils	0	10	7	0	17

- Date: December 31
- Location: Sun Bowl
  El Paso, TX
- Game start: 2:15 PM CST
- Elapsed time: 3:33
- Game attendance: 49,104
- Game weather: 53, Clear and dry, Wind 5–10 mph (8.0–16.1 km/h)
- Referee: Ken Flaherty
- TV announcers (CBS): Tim Ryan, Dave Logan, and Scott Lasky

Scoring summary
2	9:41	ASU	L. Jackson 35-yard pass from Campbell (Nycz kick)	ASU 7–0
2	0:00	ASU	Nycz 21-yard field goal	ASU 10–0
3	0:31	ASU	Martin 1-yard run (Nycz kick)	ASU 17–0
4	0:49	Iowa	R. Carter 26-yard pass from Randy Reiners (Zach Bromert kick)	ASU 17–7

== Roster ==
1997 Iowa Hawkeyes football team roster
Players
Coaches
Offense

Pos.	#	Name	Class
RB	22	Tavian Banks	Sr
FB	85	Michael Burger	Jr
WR	4	Richard Carter	Sr
WR	88	Tony Collins	So
OL	67	Chad Deal	So
WR	6	Tim Dwight	Sr
TE	80	Zeron Flemister	So
WR	18	Damon Gibson	Sr
OL	79	Mike Goff	Sr
TE	81	Chris Knipper	Sr
OL	68	Jeremy McKinney	Sr
RB	29	Doug Miller	So
QB	13	Randy Reiners	So
OL	76	Matt Reischl	Jr
C	64	Derek Rose	Jr
QB	12	Matt Sherman	Sr
OL	65	Ben Sobieski	Fr
RB	31	Rob Thein	So
TE	86	Austin Wheatley	So
WR	25	Richard Willock	Sr

Defense

Pos.	#	Name	Class
CB	23	Plez Atkins	Sr
DB	9	Matt Bowen	So
SS	15	Kerry Cooks	Sr
DL	94	Jared DeVries	Jr
NG	52	Steve English	Jr
DT	72	Epenesa Epenesa	Sr
CB	26	Ed Gibson	Sr
CB	2	Tarig Holman	So
DE	28	Jason House	Sr
LB	37	Matt Hughes	Jr
NG	90	Aron Klein	Jr
DE	19	Jeff Kramer	Jr
DT	55	Jon LaFleur	Sr
DE	48	Ryan Loftin	So
LB	56	Vernon Rollins (injured)	Jr
FS	21	Eric Thigpen	Jr
LB	97	LeVar Woods	Fr

Special teams

Pos.	#	Name	Class
P	7	Jason Baker	Fr
K	38	Zach Bromert	Jr
K	16	Greg McLaughlin	Fr

Head coach

- Hayden Fry

Coordinators/assistant coaches

- Don Patterson – Offensive Coordinator
- Bob Elliott – Defensive Coordinator
- Bret Bielema – Linebackers
- Chuck Long – Defensive backs
- Bobby Diaco – Graduate assistant

Legend

- (C) Team captain
- (S) Suspended
- (I) Ineligible
- Injured
- Redshirt

== Postseason awards ==
- Tim Dwight: consensus first-team All-American (All-purpose / kick returners) and 7th in Heisman Trophy voting.
- Jared DeVries: Big Ten Defensive Lineman of the Year

== Team players in the 1998 NFL draft ==
Player	Position	Round	Pick	NFL club
Mike Goff	OT	3	78	Cincinnati Bengals
Tavian Banks	RB	4	101	Jacksonville Jaguars
Tim Dwight	WR	4	114	Atlanta Falcons
Kerry Cooks	S	5	144	Minnesota Vikings
