= 1997 Indiana Hoosiers football team =

American college football season

1997 Indiana Hoosiers football
- Conference: Big Ten Conference
- Record: 2–9 (1–7 Big Ten)
- Head coach: Cam Cameron (1st season)
- Offensive coordinator: Pete Schmidt (1st season)
- Offensive scheme: Pro-style
- Defensive coordinator: Jon Heacock (1st season)
- Base defense: 46 flex
- MVPs: Chris Gall; Kywin Supernaw
- Captains: Chris Gall; Benyard Jones; Chris Liwienski; Jabar Robinson; Kywin Supernaw
- Home stadium: Memorial Stadium

1997 Big Ten Conference football standings
	Conf.			Overall
Team	W		L	W		L
No. 1 Michigan $	8	–	0	12	–	0
No. 12 Ohio State	6	–	2	10	–	3
No. 16 Penn State	6	–	2	9	–	3
No. 15 Purdue	6	–	2	9	–	3
Wisconsin	5	–	3	8	–	5
Iowa	4	–	4	7	–	5
Michigan State	4	–	4	7	–	5
Northwestern	3	–	5	5	–	7
Minnesota	1	–	7	3	–	9
Indiana	1	–	7	2	–	9
Illinois	0	–	8	0	–	11
$ – Conference champion; Rankings from AP Poll

The 1997 Indiana Hoosiers football team represented Indiana University Bloomington during the 1997 Big Ten Conference football season. They participated as members of the Big Ten Conference. The Hoosiers played their home games in Memorial Stadium in Bloomington, Indiana. The team was coached by Cam Cameron in his first year as head coach.

== Schedule ==
Date	Time	Opponent	Site	TV	Result	Attendance	Source
September 6	12:00 pm	at No. 7 North Carolina*	Kenan Memorial Stadium; Chapel Hill, NC	ESPN2	L 6–23	57,800	
September 13	6:00 pm	Ball State*	Memorial Stadium; Bloomington, IN		W 33–6	38,006	
September 20	2:00 pm	Kentucky*	Memorial Stadium; Bloomington, IN (rivalry)		L 7–49	41,149	
September 27	12:00 pm	at Wisconsin	Camp Randall Stadium; Madison, WI	ESPN Plus	L 26–27	78,211	
October 4	12:00 pm	No. 6 Michigan^{†}	Memorial Stadium; Bloomington, IN	ESPN Plus	L 0–37	42,240	
October 11	12:30 pm	No. 11 Michigan State	Memorial Stadium; Bloomington, IN (rivalry)	ESPN2	L 6–38	35,082	
October 18	12:30 pm	at No. 11 Ohio State	Ohio Stadium; Columbus, OH	ESPN2	L 0–31	92,368	
October 25	12:00 pm	at No. 18 Iowa	Kinnick Stadium; Iowa City, IA	ESPN Plus	L 0–62	70,397	
November 1	2:00 pm	Illinois	Memorial Stadium; Bloomington, IN (rivalry)		W 23–6	32,705	
November 15	7:00 pm	at Minnesota	Hubert H. Humphrey Metrodome; Minneapolis, MN	ESPN Plus	L 12–24	33,905	
November 22	1:00 pm	No. 23 Purdue	Memorial Stadium; Bloomington, IN (Old Oaken Bucket)		L 7–56	46,599	
*Non-conference game; ^{†}Homecoming; Rankings from AP Poll released prior to the game; All times are in Eastern time

== 1998 NFL draftees ==
Player	Round	Pick	Position	NFL Club
Victor Allotey	7	198	Guard	Buffalo Bills
Chris Liwienski	7	207	Guard	Detroit Lions
