= 1997 Louisville Cardinals football team =

American college football season

1997 Louisville Cardinals football
- Conference: Conference USA
- Record: 1–10 (0–6 C–USA)
- Head coach: Ron Cooper (3rd season)
- Offensive coordinator: Donnie Kirkpatrick (1st season)
- Offensive scheme: One back
- Defensive coordinator: Everett Withers (3rd season)
- Base defense: 4–3 flex
- Home stadium: Cardinal Stadium

1997 Conference USA football standings
	Conf.			Overall
Team	W		L	W		L
No. 19 Southern Miss $	6	–	0	9	–	3
Tulane	5	–	1	7	–	4
East Carolina	4	–	2	5	–	6
Cincinnati	2	–	4	8	–	4
Memphis	2	–	4	4	–	7
Houston	2	–	4	3	–	8
Louisville	0	–	6	1	–	10
$ – Conference champion; Rankings from AP Poll

The 1997 Louisville Cardinals football team represented the University of Louisville as a member of Conference USA (C-USA) during the 1997 NCAA Division I-A football season. Led by Ron Cooper in his third and final season as head coach, the Cardinals compiled an overall record of 1–10 with a mark of 0–6 in conference play, placing last out of seven teams in C-USA. Louisville played home games at the old Cardinal Stadium for the final season, before moving to Papa John's Cardinal Stadium in 1998.

== Schedule ==
Date	Time	Opponent	Site	TV	Result	Attendance	Source
August 30	1:30 pm	at Kentucky*	Commonwealth Stadium; Lexington, KY (Governor's Cup)		L 24–38	59,186	
September 6	2:00 pm	Utah*	Cardinal Stadium; Louisville, KY		L 21–24	35,437	
September 13	3:30 pm	Illinois*	Cardinal Stadium; Louisville, KY	CBS	W 26–14	36,824	
September 20	12:00 pm	No. 1 Penn State*	Cardinal Stadium; Louisville, KY	CBS	L 21–57	39,826	
September 27	7:00 pm	at Oklahoma*	Oklahoma Memorial Stadium; Norman, OK	FSN	L 14–35	74,993	
October 4	7:00 pm	at Southern Miss	M. M. Roberts Stadium; Hattiesburg, MS		L 24–42	23,028	
October 11	2:00 pm	Tulane	Cardinal Stadium; Louisville, KY		L 33–64	29,547	
October 25	2:00 pm	Houston	Cardinal Stadium; Louisville, KY		L 22–36	21,432	
November 1	3:30 pm	East Carolina	Cardinal Stadium; Louisville, KY	CBS	L 10–13	12,850	
November 8	3:30 pm	at Cincinnati	Nippert Stadium; Cincinnati, OH (The Keg of Nails)		L 9–28	21,346	
November 15	2:00 pm	at Memphis	Liberty Bowl Memorial Stadium; Memphis, TN (rivalry)		L 20–21	15,243	
*Non-conference game; Rankings from AP Poll released prior to the game; All times are in Central time

== Awards and honors ==
1997 Johnny Unitas Golden Arm Walk-On Player of the Year (Frank Camp Chapter)- Chris Scott
