= 1997 Houston Cougars football team =

American college football season

1997 Houston Cougars football
- Conference: Conference USA
- Record: 3–8 (2–4 C-USA)
- Head coach: Kim Helton (5th season)
- Offensive coordinator: Dan Lounsbury (1st season)
- Offensive scheme: Multiple pro-style
- Defensive coordinator: Gary Bartel (1st season)
- Base defense: Multiple 3–4
- Captains: Keon Banks; Jay McGuire; Mike Parker
- Home stadium: Houston Astrodome; Robertson Stadium

1997 Conference USA football standings
	Conf.			Overall
Team	W		L	W		L
No. 19 Southern Miss $	6	–	0	9	–	3
Tulane	5	–	1	7	–	4
East Carolina	4	–	2	5	–	6
Cincinnati	2	–	4	8	–	4
Memphis	2	–	4	4	–	7
Houston	2	–	4	3	–	8
Louisville	0	–	6	1	–	10
$ – Conference champion; Rankings from AP Poll

The 1997 Houston Cougars football team, also known as the Houston Cougars, Houston, or UH represented the University of Houston in the 1997 NCAA Division I-A football season. It was the 52nd year of season play for Houston. The team was coached by Kim Helton. The team split its home games between the Houston Astrodome and Robertson Stadium for the last season before moving its games exclusively to Robertson Stadium, the 32,000-person capacity stadium on-campus in Houston.

== Schedule ==
Date	Time	Opponent	Site	TV	Result	Attendance	Source
August 30	11:30 am	at No. 16 Alabama*	Legion Field; Birmingham, AL	JPS	L 17–42	81,591	
September 6	2:30 pm	California*	Houston Astrodome; Houston, TX	FSN	L 3–35	37,652	
September 13	2:00 pm	Pittsburgh*	Robertson Stadium; Houston, TX	FSN	L 24–35	17,611	
September 27	6:00 pm	at Minnesota*	Hubert H. Humphrey Metrodome; Minneapolis, MN		W 45–43	36,447	
October 4	5:30 pm	at No. 22 UCLA*	Rose Bowl; Pasadena, CA	FSW	L 10–66	38,004	
October 18		Cincinnati	Robertson Stadium; Houston, TX	FSN	W 41–38 ^{2OT}	14,457	
October 25	2:00 pm	at Louisville	Cardinal Stadium; Louisville, KY		W 36–22	21,432	
November 1		at Memphis	Liberty Bowl Memorial Stadium; Memphis, TN		L 3–24	20,181	
November 8	2:30 pm	East Carolina^{†}	Robertson Stadium; Houston, TX		L 27–28	17,051	
November 15		at Southern Miss	M. M. Roberts Stadium; Hattiesburg, MS	FSN	L 0–33	20,091	
November 22		Tulane	Houston Astrodome; Houston, TX	FSN	L 10–44	11,618	
*Non-conference game; ^{†}Homecoming; Rankings from AP Poll released prior to the game
