= 1997 Memphis Tigers football team =

American college football season

1997 Memphis Tigers football
- Conference: Conference USA
- Record: 4–7 (2–4 C-USA)
- Head coach: Rip Scherer (3rd season)
- Co-offensive coordinators: Rusty Burns (1st season); Dave Magazu (1st season)
- Defensive coordinator: Jim Pletcher (3rd season)
- Home stadium: Liberty Bowl Memorial Stadium

1997 Conference USA football standings
	Conf.			Overall
Team	W		L	W		L
No. 19 Southern Miss $	6	–	0	9	–	3
Tulane	5	–	1	7	–	4
East Carolina	4	–	2	5	–	6
Cincinnati	2	–	4	8	–	4
Memphis	2	–	4	4	–	7
Houston	2	–	4	3	–	8
Louisville	0	–	6	1	–	10
$ – Conference champion; Rankings from AP Poll

The 1997 Memphis Tigers football team represented the University of Memphis in the 1997 NCAA Division I-A football season. Memphis competed as a member of Conference USA. The team was led by head coach Rip Scherer. The Tigers played their home games at the Liberty Bowl Memorial Stadium.

== Schedule ==
Date	Opponent	Site	Result	Attendance	Source
August 30	at Mississippi State*	Scott Field; Starkville, MS	L 10–13	33,310	
September 6	UAB*	Liberty Bowl Memorial Stadium; Memphis, TN (Battle for the Bones)	W 28–7	24,108	
September 13	at No. 21 Michigan State*	Spartan Stadium; East Lansing, MI	L 21–51	72,131	
September 20	Minnesota*	Liberty Bowl Memorial Stadium; Memphis, TN	L 17–20	23,208	
October 4	at Cincinnati	Nippert Stadium; Cincinnati, OH (rivalry)	L 17–20	19,511	
October 11	Arkansas State*	Liberty Bowl Memorial Stadium; Memphis, TN (Paint Bucket Bowl)	W 38–9	21,357	
October 25	at East Carolina	Dowdy–Ficklen Stadium; Greenville, NC	L 10–32	28,029	
November 1	Houston^{†}	Liberty Bowl Memorial Stadium; Memphis, TN	W 24–3	20,181	
November 8	at Tulane	Superdome; New Orleans, LA	L 14–26	23,494	
November 15	Louisville	Liberty Bowl Memorial Stadium; Memphis, TN (rivalry)	W 21–20	15,234	
November 22	Southern Miss	Liberty Bowl Memorial Stadium; Memphis, TN (Black and Blue Bowl)	L 18–42	17,243	
*Non-conference game; ^{†}Homecoming; Rankings from AP Poll released prior to the game
