= 1997 Michigan State Spartans football team =

American college football season

1997 Michigan State Spartans football

Aloha Bowl, L 23–51 vs. Washington
- Conference: Big Ten Conference
- Record: 7–5 (4–4 Big Ten)
- Head coach: Nick Saban (3rd season)
- Offensive coordinator: Gary Tranquill (3rd season)
- Offensive scheme: Pro set
- Defensive coordinator: Dean Pees (3rd season)
- Base defense: 4–3
- MVP: Ike Reese
- Captains: Ike Reese; Scott Shaw
- Home stadium: Spartan Stadium

1997 Big Ten Conference football standings
	Conf.			Overall
Team	W		L	W		L
No. 1 Michigan $	8	–	0	12	–	0
No. 12 Ohio State	6	–	2	10	–	3
No. 16 Penn State	6	–	2	9	–	3
No. 15 Purdue	6	–	2	9	–	3
Wisconsin	5	–	3	8	–	5
Iowa	4	–	4	7	–	5
Michigan State	4	–	4	7	–	5
Northwestern	3	–	5	5	–	7
Minnesota	1	–	7	3	–	9
Indiana	1	–	7	2	–	9
Illinois	0	–	8	0	–	11
$ – Conference champion; Rankings from AP Poll

The 1997 Michigan State Spartans football team competed on behalf of Michigan State University in the 1997 Big Ten Conference football season. Led by third-year head coach Nick Saban, the Spartans compiled an overall record of 7–5 with a mark of 4–4 in conference play, tying for sixth place in the Big Ten. Michigan State was invited to the Aloha Bowl, where they lost, 51–23, on December 25 to Washington. The team played home games at Spartan Stadium in East Lansing, Michigan.

== Schedule ==
Date	Time	Opponent	Rank	Site	TV	Result	Attendance
September 6	12:30 p.m.	Western Michigan*	No. 25	Spartan Stadium; East Lansing, MI	ESPN Plus	W 42–10	72,317
September 13	1:00 p.m.	Memphis*	No. 21	Spartan Stadium; East Lansing, MI		W 51–21	72,131
September 20	1:30 p.m.	at Notre Dame*	No. 17	Notre Dame Stadium; Notre Dame, IN (rivalry)	NBC	W 23–7	80,225
October 4	1:00 p.m.	Minnesota^{†}	No. 12	Spartan Stadium; East Lansing, MI		W 31–10	75,263
October 11	12:30 p.m.	at Indiana	No. 11	Memorial Stadium; Bloomington, IN (rivalry)	ESPN2	W 38–6	35,082
October 18	3:30 p.m.	at Northwestern	No. 12	Ryan Field; Evanston, IL	ABC	L 17–19	47,129
October 25	12:30 p.m.	No. 5 Michigan	No. 15	Spartan Stadium; East Lansing, MI (rivalry, College GameDay)	ESPN	L 7–23	79,687
November 1	3:30 p.m.	No. 9 Ohio State	No. 21	Spartan Stadium; East Lansing, MI	ABC	L 13–37	74,903
November 8	12:30 p.m.	at No. 24 Purdue		Ross–Ade Stadium; West Lafayette, IN	ESPN2	L 21–22	55,539
November 22	2:00 p.m.	at Illinois		Memorial Stadium; Champaign, IL		W 27–17	30,087
November 29	1:00 p.m.	No. 4 Penn State		Spartan Stadium; East Lansing, MI (rivalry)	ABC	W 49–14	73,623
December 25	3:30 p.m.	vs. No. 21 Washington*	No. 25	Aloha Stadium; Halawa, HI (Aloha Bowl)	ABC	L 23–51	34,419
*Non-conference game; ^{†}Homecoming; Rankings from AP Poll released prior to the game; All times are in Eastern time

== Rankings ==
Ranking movements Legend: ██ Increase in ranking ██ Decrease in ranking — = Not ranked
	Week																	
Poll	Pre	1	2	3	4	5	6	7	8	9	10	11	12	13	14	15	16	Final
AP	25	25	25	21	17	12	12	11	12	15	21	—	—	—	—	25	25	—
Coaches	—		—	23	18	13	13	11	11	14	20	—	—	—	—	—	25	—

== Game summaries ==
=== Notre Dame ===
Team	1	2	3	4	Total
• Michigan St	14	3	3	3	23
Notre Dame	0	7	0	0	7

- Date: September 20
- Location: Notre Dame Stadium, South Bend, IN
- Game attendance: 80,225

Scoring summary
Q1	12:28	MSU	Keur 5 yard pass from Schultz (Gardner kick)	MSU 7–0
Q1	4:47	MSU	Schultz 1 yard run (Gardner kick)	MSU 14–0
Q2	6:28	MSU	Gardner 31 yard field goal	MSU 17–0
Q2	:27	ND	Brown 7 yard pass from Powlus (Sanson kick)	MSU 17–7
Q3	7:12	MSU	Gardner 32 yard field goal	MSU 20–7
Q4	6:26	MSU	Gardner 31 yard field goal	MSU 23–7

Michigan State's first win versus Notre Dame since 1986.

== Roster ==
1997 Michigan State Spartans football team roster
Players
Coaches
Offense

Pos.	#	Name	Class
OT	76	Flozell Adams	Sr
QB	16	Bill Burke	So
RB	33	Sedrick Irvin	So
QB	11	Gus Ornstein	Jr
RB	32	Antwain Patrick	Sr
TE	84	Brad Rainko	So
TE	88	Kyle Rance	So
FB	41	Travis Reece	Sr
QB	9	Todd Schultz	Sr
WR	86	Gari Scott	So
G	73	Scott Shaw	Sr

Defense

Pos.	#	Name	Class
DT	69	Brandon Call	So
CB	3	Amp Campbell	Jr
SS	43	Scott Ernsberger	Jr
LB	53	Courtney Ledyard	Jr
CB	29	Lemar Marshall	Jr
LB	44	Ike Reese	Sr
DE	91	Robaire Smith	So
LB	57	Mike Smokevitch	Jr
DT	99	Dimitrius Underwood	Jr

Special teams

Pos.	#	Name	Class
K	1	Paul Edinger	So

Head coach

- Nick Saban

Coordinators/assistant coaches

Legend

- (C) Team captain
- (S) Suspended
- (I) Ineligible
- Injured
- Redshirt

Roster

== Coaching staff ==
- Nick Saban, head coach
- Gary Tranquill, offensive coordinator, quarterbacks coach
- Bobby Williams, running backs coach
- Charlie Baggett, wide receivers coach
- Pat Shurmur, tight ends coach, special teams coordinator
- Jim Bollman, offensive line coach
- Dean Pees, defensive coordinator, inside linebackers coach
- Todd Grantham, defensive line coach
- Mark Dantonio, defensive backs coach
- Greg Colby, defensive assistant

== 1998 NFL draft ==
The following players were selected in the 1998 NFL draft.

Player	Round	Pick	Position	NFL team
Flozell Adams	2	38	Offensive tackle	Dallas Cowboys
Ike Reese	5	142	Linebacker	Philadelphia Eagles
Scott Shaw	5	143	Offensive guard	Miami Dolphins
