= 1997 Minnesota Golden Gophers football team =

American college football season

1997 Minnesota Golden Gophers football
- Conference: Big Ten Conference
- Record: 3–9 (1–7 Big Ten)
- Head coach: Glen Mason (1st season)
- Offensive coordinator: Elliot Uzelac (1st season)
- Defensive coordinator: David Gibbs (1st season)
- Captains: Tutu Atwell; Crawford Jordan; Cory Sauter; Parc Williams
- Home stadium: Hubert H. Humphrey Metrodome

1997 Big Ten Conference football standings
	Conf.			Overall
Team	W		L	W		L
No. 1 Michigan $	8	–	0	12	–	0
No. 12 Ohio State	6	–	2	10	–	3
No. 16 Penn State	6	–	2	9	–	3
No. 15 Purdue	6	–	2	9	–	3
Wisconsin	5	–	3	8	–	5
Iowa	4	–	4	7	–	5
Michigan State	4	–	4	7	–	5
Northwestern	3	–	5	5	–	7
Minnesota	1	–	7	3	–	9
Indiana	1	–	7	2	–	9
Illinois	0	–	8	0	–	11
$ – Conference champion; Rankings from AP Poll

The 1997 Minnesota Golden Gophers football team represented the University of Minnesota in the 1997 Big Ten Conference football season. In their first year under head coach Glen Mason, the Golden Gophers compiled an overall record of 3–9 with a mark of 1–7 in conference play, tying for ninth place in the Big Ten, record and were outscored 340 to 236.

Defensive end Lamanzer Williams was named an All-American by the College Football Writers Association and the Football Writers Association of America. Williams was also named All-Big Ten first team. Wide receiver Tutu Atwell and strong safety Tyrone Carter were named All-Big Ten second team. Linebacker Luke Braaten, cornerback Jason Hagman, placekicker Erin McManus, fullback Brad Prigge, long snapper Derek Rackley, quarterback Cory Sauter, defensive tackle Theron von Behren and linebacker Parc Williams were named Academic All-Big Ten.

Total attendance for the season was 269,385, which averaged out to 44,897 per game. The season high for attendance was against rival Wisconsin.

== Schedule ==
Date	Time	Opponent	Site	TV	Result	Attendance
August 30	8:00 pm	at Hawaii*	Aloha Stadium; Halawa, HI		L 3–17	31,510
September 13	6:00 pm	Iowa State*	Hubert H. Humphrey Metrodome; Minneapolis, MN	MSC	W 53–29	55,943
September 20	6:00 pm	at Memphis*	Liberty Bowl Memorial Stadium; Memphis, TN	MSC	W 20–17	23,208
September 27	6:00 pm	Houston*	Hubert H. Humphrey Metrodome; Minneapolis, MN	MSC	L 43–45	36,447
October 4	12:00 pm	at No. 13 Michigan State	Spartan Stadium; East Lansing, MI		L 10–31	75,263
October 11	6:00 pm	Purdue	Hubert H. Humphrey Metrodome; Minneapolis, MN	MSC	L 43–59	37,821
October 18	11:00 am	at No. 1 Penn State	Beaver Stadium; University Park, PA (Governor's Victory Bell)	ESPN Plus	L 15–16	96,953
October 25	11:30 am	Wisconsin	Hubert H. Humphrey Metrodome; Minneapolis, MN (rivalry)	ESPN2	L 21–22	57,563
November 1	11:00 am	at No. 4 Michigan	Michigan Stadium; Ann Arbor, MI (Little Brown Jug)	ESPN Plus	L 3–24	106,577
November 8	3:00 pm	No. 7 Ohio State	Hubert H. Humphrey Metrodome; Minneapolis, MN		L 3–31	47,706
November 15	6:00 pm	Indiana	Hubert H. Humphrey Metrodome; Minneapolis, MN	MSC	W 24–12	33,905
November 22	1:00 pm	at Iowa	Kinnick Stadium; Iowa City, IA (rivalry)		L 0–31	64,591
*Non-conference game; Rankings from AP Poll released prior to the game; All times are in Central time

== Roster ==
- WR Tutu Atwell
- DB Tyrone Carter, Soph.
