= 1997 Tulane Green Wave football team =

American college football season

1997 Tulane Green Wave football
- Conference: Conference USA
- Record: 7–4 (5–1 C-USA)
- Head coach: Tommy Bowden (1st season)
- Offensive coordinator: Rich Rodriguez (1st season)
- Offensive scheme: Spread option
- Defensive coordinator: Rick Smith (1st season)
- Base defense: 4–3
- Home stadium: Louisiana Superdome

1997 Conference USA football standings
	Conf.			Overall
Team	W		L	W		L
No. 19 Southern Miss $	6	–	0	9	–	3
Tulane	5	–	1	7	–	4
East Carolina	4	–	2	5	–	6
Cincinnati	2	–	4	8	–	4
Memphis	2	–	4	4	–	7
Houston	2	–	4	3	–	8
Louisville	0	–	6	1	–	10
$ – Conference champion; Rankings from AP Poll

The 1997 Tulane Green Wave football team was an American football team that represented Tulane University during the 1997 NCAA Division I-A football season as a member of Conference USA. In their first year under head coach Tommy Bowden, the team compiled an overall record of 7–4, with a mark of 5–1 in conference play, placing second in C-USA.

== Schedule ==
Date	Opponent	Site	Result	Attendance	Source
September 6	Cincinnati	Louisiana Superdome; New Orleans, LA	W 31–17	20,828	
September 13	Rice*	Louisiana Superdome; New Orleans, LA	L 24–30	19,602	
September 20	at Syracuse*	Carrier Dome; Syracuse, NY	L 19–30	42,246	
October 4	Army*	Louisiana Superdome; New Orleans, LA	W 41–0	16,242	
October 11	at Louisville	Cardinal Stadium; Louisville, KY	W 64–33	29,547	
October 18	East Carolina	Louisiana Superdome; New Orleans, LA	W 33–16	23,340	
October 25	at Southern Miss	M. M. Roberts Stadium; Hattiesburg, MS (rivalry)	L 13–34	26,092	
November 1	at Southwestern Louisiana*	Cajun Field; Lafayette, LA	W 56–0	17,724	
November 8	Memphis	Louisiana Superdome; New Orleans, LA	W 26–14	23,494	
November 15	Ole Miss*	Louisiana Superdome; New Orleans, LA (rivalry)	L 24–41	35,607	
November 22	at Houston	Houston Astrodome; Houston, TX	W 44–10	11,618	
*Non-conference game
