= 1997 Illinois Fighting Illini football team =

American college football season

1997 Illinois Fighting Illini football
- Conference: Big Ten Conference
- Record: 0–11 (0–8 Big Ten)
- Head coach: Ron Turner (1st season)
- Offensive coordinator: Buddy Teevens (1st season)
- Offensive scheme: Pro-style
- Defensive coordinator: Tim Kish (1st season)
- Base defense: 4–3
- MVP: Robert Holcombe
- Captains: Ivan Benson; Danny Clark; Robert Holcombe
- Home stadium: Memorial Stadium

1997 Big Ten Conference football standings
	Conf.			Overall
Team	W		L	W		L
No. 1 Michigan $	8	–	0	12	–	0
No. 12 Ohio State	6	–	2	10	–	3
No. 16 Penn State	6	–	2	9	–	3
No. 15 Purdue	6	–	2	9	–	3
Wisconsin	5	–	3	8	–	5
Iowa	4	–	4	7	–	5
Michigan State	4	–	4	7	–	5
Northwestern	3	–	5	5	–	7
Minnesota	1	–	7	3	–	9
Indiana	1	–	7	2	–	9
Illinois	0	–	8	0	–	11
$ – Conference champion; Rankings from AP Poll

The 1997 Illinois Fighting Illini football team was an American football team that represented the University of Illinois at Urbana-Champaign as a member of the Big Ten Conference during the 1997 NCAA Division I-A football season. In their first year under head coach Ron Turner, the Fighting Illini compiled a 0–11 record (0–8 in conference games), finished last out of eleven teams in the Big Ten, and were outscored by a total of 368 to 119.

The team's statistical leaders included quarterback Mark Hokestra (1,029 passing yards), running back Robert Holcombe (1,253 rushing yards, 36 points scored) and wide receiver Lenny Willis (465 receiving yards).

As of 2025, the 1997 Illinois team was the last Big Ten football team that failed to register a single win.

The team played its home games at Memorial Stadium in Champaign, Illinois.

== Schedule ==
Date	Time	Opponent	Site	TV	Result	Attendance
September 6	6:00 pm	Southern Miss*	Memorial Stadium; Champaign, IL	ESPN2	L 7–24	44,519
September 13	2:30 pm	at Louisville*	Cardinal Stadium; Louisville, KY	CBS	L 13–26	36,824
September 20	11:30 am	No. 19 Washington State*	Memorial Stadium; Champaign, IL	ESPN2	L 22–35	47,131
September 27	11:30 am	at No. 11 Iowa	Kinnick Stadium; Iowa City, IA	ESPN2	L 10–38	70,397
October 4	11:30 am	No. 2 Penn State	Memorial Stadium; Champaign, IL	ESPN2	L 6–41	51,523
October 11	11:00 am	at Wisconsin	Camp Randall Stadium; Madison, WI	ESPN Plis	L 7–31	79,327
October 25	1:00 pm	No. 22 Purdue	Memorial Stadium; Champaign, IL (rivalry)		L 3–48	45,122
November 1	1:00 pm	at Indiana	Memorial Stadium; Bloomington, IN (rivalry)		L 6–23	32,705
November 8	11:00 am	Northwestern	Memorial Stadium; Champaign, IL (rivalry)	ESPN Plus	L 21–34	41,195
November 15	11:00 am	at No. 4 Ohio State	Ohio Stadium; Columbus, OH (Illibuck)	ESPN Plus	L 6–41	92,008
November 22	1:00 pm	Michigan State	Memorial Stadium; Champaign, IL		L 17–27	30,087
*Non-conference game; Rankings from AP Poll released prior to the game; All times are in Central time
