= 1997 East Carolina Pirates football team =

American college football season

1997 East Carolina Pirates football
- Conference: Conference USA
- Record: 5–6 (4–2 C-USA)
- Head coach: Steve Logan (6th season)
- Offensive coordinator: Doug Martin (2nd season)
- Offensive scheme: Spread
- Defensive coordinator: Paul Jette (4th season)
- Base defense: 4–3
- Home stadium: Dowdy–Ficklen Stadium

1997 Conference USA football standings
| | Conf. | | | Overall |
| Team | W | | L | W | | L |
|---|---|---|---|---|---|---|
| No. 19 Southern Miss $ | 6 | – | 0 | 9 | – | 3 |
| Tulane | 5 | – | 1 | 7 | – | 4 |
| East Carolina | 4 | – | 2 | 5 | – | 6 |
| Cincinnati | 2 | – | 4 | 8 | – | 4 |
| Memphis | 2 | – | 4 | 4 | – | 7 |
| Houston | 2 | – | 4 | 3 | – | 8 |
| Louisville | 0 | – | 6 | 1 | – | 10 |
$ – Conference champion; Rankings from AP Poll

The 1997 East Carolina Pirates football team was an American football team that represented East Carolina University as a member of Conference USA during the 1997 NCAA Division I-A football season. In their sixth season under head coach Steve Logan, the team compiled a 5–6 record. The Pirates offense scored 214 points while the defense allowed 298 points.

== Schedule ==
| Date | Time | Opponent | Site | TV | Result | Attendance | Source |
|---|---|---|---|---|---|---|---|
| September 6 | 12:30 pm | at West Virginia* | Mountaineer Field; Morgantown, WV | ESPN | L 17–24 | 51,143 | |
| September 13 | 3:30 pm | Wake Forest* | Dowdy–Ficklen Stadium; Greenville, NC | FSN | W 25–24 | 38,031 | |
| September 20 | 3:00 pm | South Carolina* | Dowdy–Ficklen Stadium; Greenville, NC | FSN | L 0–26 | 38,902 | |
| October 4 | 12:30 pm | at Syracuse* | Carrier Dome; Syracuse, NY | | L 0–56 | 44,054 | |
| October 11 | 3:30 pm | Southern Miss | Dowdy–Ficklen Stadium; Greenville, NC | FSN | L 13–23 | 33,904 | |
| October 18 | 8:00 pm | at Tulane | Louisiana Superdome; New Orleans, LA | WNCT | L 16–33 | 23,340 | |
| October 25 | 3:30 pm | Memphis^{†} | Dowdy–Ficklen Stadium; Greenville, NC | FSN | W 32–10 | 28,029 | |
| November 1 | 3:00 pm | at Louisville | Cardinal Stadium; Louisville, KY | WNCT | W 45–31 | 12,850 | |
| November 8 | 3:30 pm | at Houston | Robertson Stadium; Houston, TX | WNCT | W 28–27 | 17,051 | |
| November 13 | 8:00 pm | Cincinnati | Dowdy–Ficklen Stadium; Greenville, NC | ESPN | W 14–7 | 25,509 | |
| November 22 | 1:00 pm | at NC State* | Carter–Finley Stadium; Raleigh, NC (rivalry) | | L 24–37 | 51,500 | |
*Non-conference game; ^{†}Homecoming; All times are in Eastern time
