= 1997 Wisconsin Badgers football team =

American college football season

1997 Wisconsin Badgers football

Outback Bowl, L 6–33 vs. Georgia
- Conference: Big Ten Conference
- Record: 8–5 (5–3 Big Ten)
- Head coach: Barry Alvarez (8th season)
- Offensive coordinator: Brad Childress (6th season)
- Offensive scheme: Smashmouth
- Defensive coordinator: Kevin Cosgrove (3rd season)
- Base defense: 4–3
- MVP: Tom Burke
- Captains: Kevin Huntley; David Lysek; Carl McCullough
- Home stadium: Camp Randall Stadium

1997 Big Ten Conference football standings
	Conf.			Overall
Team	W		L	W		L
No. 1 Michigan $	8	–	0	12	–	0
No. 12 Ohio State	6	–	2	10	–	3
No. 16 Penn State	6	–	2	9	–	3
No. 15 Purdue	6	–	2	9	–	3
Wisconsin	5	–	3	8	–	5
Iowa	4	–	4	7	–	5
Michigan State	4	–	4	7	–	5
Northwestern	3	–	5	5	–	7
Minnesota	1	–	7	3	–	9
Indiana	1	–	7	2	–	9
Illinois	0	–	8	0	–	11
$ – Conference champion; Rankings from AP Poll

The 1997 Wisconsin Badgers football team was an American football team that represented the University of Wisconsin–Madison as a member of the Big Ten Conference during the 1997 NCAA Division I-A football season. In their eighth year under head coach Barry Alvarez, the Badgers compiled an 8–5 record (5–3 in conference games), finished in fifth place in the Big Ten, and were outscored by a total of 306 to 291. After a 34–0 loss to Donovan McNabb and Syracuse in the Kickoff Classic, the Badgers won six straight games against unranked teams, before losing to unranked Purdue, and then rebounding for the program's first victory over a Hayden Fry-coached Iowa team. The Badgers concluded their season with three consecutive defeats, losing to No. 1 Michigan, No. 6 Penn State, and in the Outback Bowl against No. 12 Georgia. The Badgers were unranked in the final AP and Coaches polls.

The team's statistical leaders for all games, including the Outback Bowl, were quarterback Mike Samuel (1,896 passing yards, 55.5% completion percentage), running back Ron Dayne (1,457 rushing yards, 5.5 yards per carry, 90 points scored), wide receiver Donald Hayes (45 receptions for 618 yards), and linebacker Donnel Thompson (82 solo tackles, 141 total tackles). Defensive end Tom Burke led the team with 16 tackles for loss (including eight sacks) and won the team's most valuable player award. Dayne received first-team All-America honors from Football News. Kicker Matt Davenport, who converted 14 of 17 field goals and 31 of 33 extra points, was the only Badger to receive first-team honors on the 1997 All-Big Ten Conference football team; Dayne was placed on the second team by both the coaches and media.

The team played its home games at Camp Randall Stadium in Madison, Wisconsin.

== Schedule ==
Date	Time	Opponent	Rank	Site	TV	Result	Attendance	Source
August 24	1:00 p.m.	vs. No. 17 Syracuse*	No. 24	Giants Stadium; East Rutherford, NJ (Kickoff Classic)	ABC	L 0–34	51,185	
September 6	2:00 p.m.	Boise State*		Camp Randall Stadium; Madison, WI		W 28–24	73,209	
September 13	5:30 p.m.	at San Jose State*		Spartan Stadium; San Jose, CA		W 56–10	23,042	
September 20	1:00 p.m.	San Diego State*		Camp Randall Stadium; Madison, WI		W 36–10	76,864	
September 27	11:20 a.m.	Indiana		Camp Randall Stadium; Madison, WI	ESPN Plus	W 27–26	78,211	
October 4	6:00 p.m.	at Northwestern		Ryan Field; Evanston, IL	ESPN	W 26–25	47,129	
October 11	11:20 a.m.	Illinois^{†}		Camp Randall Stadium; Madison, WI	ESPN Plus	W 31–7	79,327	
October 18	1:00 p.m.	at Purdue	No. 24	Ross–Ade Stadium; West Lafayette, IN		L 20–45	54,252	
October 25	11:30 a.m.	at Minnesota		Hubert H. Humphrey Metrodome; Minneapolis, MN (rivalry)	ESPN2	W 22–21	57,563	
November 8	11:30 a.m.	No. 12 Iowa^{†}		Camp Randall Stadium; Madison, WI (rivalry)	ESPN	W 13–10	79,864	
November 15	2:30 p.m.	No. 1 Michigan	No. 23	Camp Randall Stadium; Madison, WI	ABC	L 16–26	79,806	
November 22	2:30 p.m.	at No. 6 Penn State	No. 24	Beaver Stadium; University Park, PA	ABC	L 10–35	96,934	
January 1, 1998	10:00 a.m.	vs. No. 11 Georgia*		Houlihan's Stadium; Tampa, FL (Outback Bowl)	ESPN	L 6–33	56,186	
*Non-conference game; ^{†}Homecoming; Rankings from AP Poll released prior to the game; All times are in Central time

== Rankings ==
Ranking movements Legend: ██ Increase in ranking ██ Decrease in ranking — = Not ranked
	Week																	
Poll	Pre	1	2	3	4	5	6	7	8	9	10	11	12	13	14	15	16	Final
AP	24	—	—	—	—	—	—	—	24	—	—	—	23	24	—	—	—	—
Coaches	24		—	—	—	—	—	—	24	—	—	—	24	24	—	—	—	—

== Game summaries ==
=== Syracuse ===
Team	1	2	3	4	Total
• Syracuse	10	14	7	3	34
Wisconsin	0	0	0	0	0

- Date: August 24
- Location: Giants Stadium
- Game attendance: 51,185

=== Boise State ===
Team	1	2	3	4	Total
Boise St	10	7	0	7	24
• Wisconsin	7	7	7	7	28

- Date: September 6
- Location: Camp Randall Stadium

=== San Jose State ===
Team	1	2	3	4	Total
• Wisconsin	14	28	14	0	56
San Jose St	10	0	0	0	10

- Date: September 13
- Location: Spartan Stadium
- Game attendance: 23,042

=== San Diego State ===
Team	1	2	3	4	Total
San Diego St	0	0	3	7	10
• Wisconsin	17	5	7	7	36

- Date: September 20
- Location: Camp Randall Stadium

=== Indiana ===
Team	1	2	3	4	Total
Indiana	7	10	6	3	26
• Wisconsin	7	10	0	10	27

- Date: September 27
- Location: Camp Randall Stadium

=== Northwestern ===
Team	1	2	3	4	Total
• Wisconsin	13	3	7	3	26
Northwestern	6	8	11	0	25

- Date: October 4
- Location: Ryan Field

=== Illinois ===
Team	1	2	3	4	Total
Illinois	0	7	0	0	7
• Wisconsin	14	7	10	0	31

- Date: October 11
- Location: Camp Randall Stadium

=== Purdue ===
Team	1	2	3	4	Total
Wisconsin	0	10	7	3	20
• Purdue	21	7	7	10	45

- Date: October 18
- Location: Ross–Ade Stadium

=== Minnesota ===
Team	1	2	3	4	Total
• Wisconsin	7	6	0	9	22
Minnesota	8	0	13	0	21

- Date: October 25
- Location: Hubert H. Humphrey Metrodome
- Game attendance: 57,563
- Game weather: Indoors (dome)

Scoring summary
Q1	12:00	WIS	Simmons 53 yard pass from Samuel (Davenport kick)	WIS 7–0
Q1	3:50	MINN	Bailey 30 yard field goal	WIS 7–3
Q1	1:55	MINN	Safety	WIS 7–5
Q1	:10	MINN	Bailey 42 yard field goal	MINN 8–7
Q2	11:52	WIS	Hayes 53 yard pass from Samuel (two-point conversion failed)	WIS 13–8
Q3	7:57	MINN	Nelson 11 yard pass from Sauter (two-point conversion failed)	MINN 14–13
Q3	3:50	MINN	Evans 4 yard run (Bailey kick)	MINN 21–13
Q4	13:18	WIS	Davenport 38 yard field goal	MINN 21–16
Q4	7:10	WIS	Dayne 1 yard run (two-point conversion failed)	WIS 22–21

=== Iowa ===
Team	1	2	3	4	Total
Iowa	0	0	7	3	10
• Wisconsin	0	13	0	0	13

- Date: November 8
- Location: Camp Randall Stadium
- Game attendance: 79,864

=== Michigan ===
Team	1	2	3	4	Total
• Michigan	7	9	0	10	26
Wisconsin	0	3	7	6	16

- Date: November 15
- Location: Camp Randall Stadium

=== Penn State ===
Team	1	2	3	4	Total
Wisconsin	3	0	0	7	10
• Penn St	7	14	14	0	35

- Date: November 22
- Location: Beaver Stadium

=== Outback Bowl ===
Team	1	2	3	4	Total
Wisconsin	0	0	0	6	6
• Georgia	12	7	7	7	33

- Date: January 1
- Location: Tampa Stadium
- Game attendance: 56,186

== Personnel ==
=== Roster ===
1997 Wisconsin Badgers football team roster
Players
Coaches
Offense

Pos.	#	Name	Class
WR	7	Willie Austin	So
FB	32	Branden Cantrell	Sr
WR	88	Chris Chambers	Fr
FB	48	Rob Christen	Fr
G	54	Dave Costa	Fr
OT	66	Pat Daley	So
RB	33	Ron Dayne	So
RB	4	Eddie Faulkner	Fr
G	60	Bill Ferrario	Fr
OT	79	Aaron Gibson	Jr
WR	23	Rasheed Golden	Fr
TE	89	Eric Grams	Jr
G	73	Joe Gribowski	Fr
WR	84	Donald Hayes	Sr
WR	6	Kevin Huntley (C)	Sr
OL	76	Josh Jakubowski	Fr
OL	52	Coleman Johnson	Jr
QB	12	Scott Kavanagh	So
FB	37	Cecil Martin	Jr
QB	19	Ben McCormick	Sr
RB	13	Carl McCullough (C)	Sr
OT	75	Chris McIntosh	So
WR	1	Ahmad Merritt	So
C	70	Casey Rabach	Fr
TE	87	Dague Retzlaff	Fr
C	53	Rob Roell	So
QB	10	Mike Samuel	Jr
TE	85	John Sigmund	Fr
WR	82	Tony Simmons	Sr
TE, LS	86	Mike Solwold	Fr
TE	49	Ryan Sondrup	Jr
OT	74	Mark Tauscher	So
WR	29	Delta Triplett	Sr
RB	22	Charles Williams	So
RB	21	Tony Williams	So

Defense

Pos.	#	Name	Class
LB	29	Bob Adamov	Jr
S	17	Demetrius Brown	So
CB	3	Onjai Bryant	So
DE	74	Tom Burke	Jr
CB	38	Lamar Campbell	Sr
DE	25	Marcus Carpenter	So
DE	99	Dave Cruickshank	Jr
LB	51	Mark Davis	Jr
S	8	Jason Doering	Fr
LB	50	Donny Eicher	So
DE	96	John Favret	Fr
LB	16	Chris Ghidorzi	So
LB	5	Edgerton Hartwell	Fr
NT	59	Joe Innis	Sr
NT	58	Chris Janek	So
S	24	Donte King	Fr
LB	19	Roger Knight	Fr
DT	78	Ross Kolodziej	Fr
LB	45	Dan Lisowski	Fr
DE	91	Rob Lurtsema	Sr
LB	57	David Lysek (C)	Sr
NT	71	Eric Mahlik	Fr
LB	32	Ryan Marks	Fr
DE	9	Sam Mueller	Fr
S	26	Bobby Myers	So
S	15	Tim Rosga	So
CB	28	Jason Suttle	Sr
S	34	Leonard Taylor	Jr
LB	44	Donnel Thompson	So
S	33	Scott Wagner	Sr
S	18	Shadrick Washington	Fr
LB	2	Marcus White	So
DT	92	Brandon Williams	Jr

Special teams

Pos.	#	Name	Class
K	28	Matt Davenport	Jr
K	20	Vitaly Pisetsky	So
LS	46	Mike Schneck	So
P	23	Eric Skrzypchak	So
TE, LS	86	Mike Solwold	Fr
P	14	Kevin Stemke	Fr

Head coach

- Barry Alvarez

Coordinators/assistant coaches

- Brad Childress – Offensive Coordinator/Quarterbacks
- Kevin Cosgrove – Defensive Coordinator/Inside Linebackers
- Tim Davis – Offensive Tackles/Tight Ends
- Phil Elmassian – Defensive Backs
- Jay Hayes – Outside Linebackers/Strong Safeties/Special Teams
- Jim Hueber – Guards and Centers
- Henry Mason – Wide Receivers
- John Palermo – Assistant Head Coach/Defensive Line
- Brian White – Running Backs
- Bernie Wyatt – Director of Football Operations

Legend

- (C) Team captain
- (S) Suspended
- (I) Ineligible
- Injured
- Redshirt

Roster
Last update: 1997-06-17

=== Regular starters ===
Position	Player
Quarterback	Mike Samuel
Running back	Ron Dayne
Fullback	Cecil Martin
Wide receiver	Donald Hayes
Wide receiver	Tony Simmons
Tight end	Eric Grams
Left tackle	Chris McIntosh
Left guard	Bill Ferrario
Center	Casey Rabach
Right guard	Dave Costa
Right tackle	Aaron Gibson

Position	Player
Defensive end	John Favret
Defensive tackle	Ross Kolodziej
Nose guard	Chris Janek
Defensive end	Tom Burke
Outside linebacker	Bob Adamov
Inside linebacker	Donnel Thompson
Outside linebacker	David Lysek
Cornerback	Jason Suttle
Free safety	Bobby Myers
Strong safety	Leonard Taylor
Cornerback	Lamar Campbell

== Wisconsin players selected in the 1998 NFL draft ==
Player	Position	Round	Overall Selection	NFL team
Tony Simmons	Wide Receiver	2	52	New England Patriots
Donald Hayes	Wide Receiver	4	106	Carolina Panthers
