= 1997 Ohio State Buckeyes football team =

American college football season

1997 Ohio State Buckeyes football

Sugar Bowl, L 14–31 vs. Florida State
- Conference: Big Ten Conference

Ranking
- Coaches: No. 12
- AP: No. 12
- Record: 10–3 (6–2 Big Ten)
- Head coach: John Cooper (10th season)
- Offensive coordinator: Mike Jacobs (1st season)
- Offensive scheme: Singleback
- Defensive coordinator: Fred Pagac (2nd season)
- Base defense: 4–3
- MVP: Antoine Winfield
- Captains: Winfield Garnett; Stanley Jackson
- Home stadium: Ohio Stadium

1997 Big Ten Conference football standings
	Conf.			Overall
Team	W		L	W		L
No. 1 Michigan $	8	–	0	12	–	0
No. 12 Ohio State	6	–	2	10	–	3
No. 16 Penn State	6	–	2	9	–	3
No. 15 Purdue	6	–	2	9	–	3
Wisconsin	5	–	3	8	–	5
Iowa	4	–	4	7	–	5
Michigan State	4	–	4	7	–	5
Northwestern	3	–	5	5	–	7
Minnesota	1	–	7	3	–	9
Indiana	1	–	7	2	–	9
Illinois	0	–	8	0	–	11
$ – Conference champion; Rankings from AP Poll

The 1997 Ohio State Buckeyes football team was an American football team that represented the Ohio State University as a member of the Big Ten Conference during the 1997 NCAA Division I-A football season. In their tenth year under head coach John Cooper, the Buckeyes compiled a 10–3 record (6–2 in conference games), finished in a three-way tie for second place in the Big Ten, and outscored opponents by a total of 380 to 139. Against ranked opponents, the Buckeyes defeated No. 11 Iowa and No. 21 Michigan State and lost to No. 2 Penn State and No. 1 Michigan. The Buckeyes concluded the season with a 31–14 loss to No. 4 Florida State in the 1998 Sugar Bowl. Ohio State was ranked No. 12 in the final AP poll.

The Buckeyes gained an average of 155.0 rushing yards and 226.1 passing yards per game. On defense, they gave up 114.7 rushing yards and 132.6 passing yards per game. Quarterback duties were split between junior Joe Germaine (1,674 passing yards) and senior Stanley Jackson (1,021 passing yards). The team's other statistical leaders included running back Pepe Pearson (809 rushing yards, 4.8 yards per carry) and wide receiver David Boston (70 receptions for 930 yards). Linebacker Andy Katzenmoyer was selected as a consensus first-team All-American. Defensive back Antoine Winfield also received first-team All-America honors from the American Football Coaches Association (AFCA) and Football Writers Association of America (FWAA). Six Ohio State players received first-team honors on the 1997 All-Big Ten Conference football team: Boston; Katzenmoyer; Winfield; offensive tackle Eric Gohlstin; defensive back Damon Moore; and punter Brent Bartholomew.

The team played its home games at Ohio Stadium in Columbus, Ohio.

== Schedule ==
Date	Time	Opponent	Rank	Site	TV	Result	Attendance	Source
August 28	8:00 p.m.	Wyoming*	No. 9	Ohio Stadium; Columbus, OH (BCA Classic)	ESPN2	W 24–10	89,122	
September 13	1:30 p.m.	Bowling Green*	No. 9	Ohio Stadium; Columbus, OH		W 44–13	93,151	
September 20	3:30 p.m.	Arizona*	No. 9	Ohio Stadium; Columbus, OH	ABC	W 28–20	91,152	
September 27	12:00 p.m.	at Missouri*	No. 7	Faurot Field; Columbia, MO	ABC	W 31–10	58,882	
October 4	3:30 p.m.	No. 11 Iowa	No. 7	Ohio Stadium; Columbus, OH (College GameDay)	ABC	W 23–7	92,536	
October 11	3:30 p.m.	at No. 2 Penn State	No. 7	Beaver Stadium; University Park, PA (rivalry)	ABC	L 27–31	97,282	
October 18	12:30 p.m.	Indiana	No. 11	Ohio Stadium; Columbus, OH	ESPN2	W 31–0	92,368	
October 25	3:30 p.m.	Northwestern	No. 9	Ohio Stadium; Columbus, OH	ABC	W 49–6	92,445	
November 1	3:30 p.m.	at No. 21 Michigan State	No. 9	Spartan Stadium; East Lansing, MI	ABC	W 37–13	74,903	
November 8	4:00 p.m.	at Minnesota	No. 7	Hubert H. Humphrey Metrodome; Minneapolis, MN		W 31–3	47,706	
November 15	12:00 p.m.	Illinois	No. 4	Ohio Stadium; Columbus, OH (Illibuck)	ESPN Plus	W 41–6	92,008	
November 22	12:00 p.m.	at No. 1 Michigan	No. 4	Michigan Stadium; Ann Arbor, MI (rivalry)	ABC	L 14–20	106,982	
January 1, 1998	8:00 p.m.	vs. No. 4 Florida State*	No. 9	Louisiana Superdome; New Orleans, LA (Sugar Bowl)	ABC	L 14–31	67,289	
*Non-conference game; Rankings from AP Poll released prior to the game; All times are in Eastern time

== Rankings ==
Ranking movements Legend: ██ Increase in ranking ██ Decrease in ranking
	Week																	
Poll	Pre	1	2	3	4	5	6	7	8	9	10	11	12	13	14	15	16	Final
AP	9	9	9	9	9	7	7	7	11	9	9	7	4	4	9	9	9	12
Coaches	9	9	9	9	8	7	7	7	12	9	9	8	4	4	11	10	10	12

== Game summaries ==
=== Wyoming ===
Wyoming Cowboys at Ohio State Buckeyes

Quarter	1	2	3	4	Total
Wyoming	3	0	7	0	10
Ohio State	10	0	14	0	24

at Ohio Stadium, Columbus, Ohio

- Date: August 28, 1997
- Game time: 8:00 p.m. EST
- Game weather: 75°, Clear, wind 5-10 N
- Game attendance: 89,112
- Referee: J. Kemerling

Game information
First quarter
- OSU - Stanley Jackson 41-yard run (Dan Stultz kick)
- WYO - Cory Wedel 38-yard field goal
- OSU - Dan Stultz kick 40-yard field goal

Second quarter

- No scoring

Third quarter

- OSU - Michael Wiley 32-yard run (Dan Stultz kick)
- OSU - Dee Miller 45-yard pass from Stanley Jackson (Dan Stultz kick)
- WYO - Mike Jenkins 11-yard run (Cory Wedel kick)

Fourth quarter

- No scoring

=== Missouri ===
#7 Ohio State Buckeyes at Missouri Tigers

Quarter	1	2	3	4	Total
Ohio State	7	7	14	3	31
Missouri	7	3	0	0	10

at Faurot Field, Columbia, Missouri

- Date: September 27, 1997
- Game time: 12:00 p.m. EST
- Game weather: 78°, Partly Cloudy, wind 5-10 S
- Game attendance: 58,882
- Referee: Randy Christal

Game information
First quarter
- OSU - Pepe Pearson 3 yd run (Dan Stultz kick)
- MIZ - Corby Jones 8 yd run (Scott Knickman kick)

Second quarter

- MIZ - Scott Knickman 27 yd field goal
- OSU - David Boston 5 yd pass from Joe Germaine (Dan Stultz kick)

Third quarter

- OSU - David Boston 28 yd pass from Joe Germaine (Dan Stultz kick)
- OSU - Michael Wiley 1 yd run (Dan Stultz kick)

Fourth quarter

- OSU - Dan Stultz 28 yd field goal

=== Northwestern ===
Northwestern Wildcats (3–5) at Ohio State Buckeyes (6–1)

Quarter	1	2	3	4	Total
Northwestern	3	3	0	0	6
Ohio State	0	14	21	14	49

at Ohio Stadium • Columbus, Ohio

- Date: October 25
- Game time: 3:30 p.m.
- Game weather: Overcast • 58 °F (14 °C) • Wind NE 10 miles per hour (16 km/h; 8.7 kn) to 15 miles per hour (24 km/h; 13 kn)
- Game attendance: 92,445
- Referee: D. Witvoet

Game information

Northwestern

- Tim Hughes
  7/15, 63 Yds
- Brian Marshall
  7 Rush, 36 Yds
- T. Waterman
  2 Rec, 20 Yds

Ohio St

- Joe Germaine
  8/12, 177 Yds, 3 TD
- Michael Wiley
  15 Rush, 73 Yds
- Dee Miller
  5 Rec, 96 Yds, 2 TD

Scoring summary

Quarter	Time	Drive			Team	Scoring information	Score	
Quarter	Time	Plays	Yards	TOP	Team	Scoring information	NW	OSU
1	11:47	8	33	3:13	Northwestern	27-yard field goal by Brian Gowins	3	0
2	12:02	14	92	5:18	Ohio St	Pepe Pearson 13-yard touchdown run, Dan Stultz kick good	3	7
2	6:14	12	61	5:48	Northwestern	36-yard field goal by Brian Gowins	6	7
2	0:27	2	43	0:14	Ohio St	Dee Miller 27-yard touchdown reception from Joe Germaine, Dan Stultz kick good	6	14
3	10:28	7	55	2:54	Ohio St	Pepe Pearson 6-yard touchdown run, Dan Stultz kick good	6	21
3	1:56	13	59	6:01	Ohio St	Dee Miller 11-yard touchdown reception from Stanley Jackson, Dan Stultz kick good	6	28
3	0:03	3	62	0:50	Ohio St	David Boston 35-yard touchdown reception from Joe Germaine, Dan Stultz kick good	6	35
4	9:49	7	64	3:02	Ohio St	Tom Hoying 29-yard touchdown reception from Joe Germaine, Dan Stultz kick good	6	42
4	5:31	6	80	2:57	Ohio St	Ken-Yon Rambo 38-yard touchdown reception from Mark Garcia, Dan Stultz kick good	6	49
"TOP" = time of possession. For other American football terms, see Glossary of American football.							6	49

== Personnel ==
=== Coaching staff ===
- John Cooper, head coach (10th year)
- Bill Conley, tight ends, recruiting coordinator (11th year)
- Jim Heacock, defensive line (2nd year)
- Mike Jacobs, offensive coordinator (3rd year)
- Fred Pagac, defensive coordinator (16th year)
- Tim Salem, quarterbacks (1st year)
- Shawn Simms, defensive ends (1st year)
- Tim Spencer, running backs (4th year)
- Chuck Stobart, wide receivers (3rd year)
- Jon Tenuta, defensive backs (2nd year)

=== Roster ===
1997 Ohio State Buckeyes football team roster
Players
Coaches
Offense

Pos.	#	Name	Class
QB	7	Joe Germaine	Jr
C	77	Tyson Walter	Fr
RB	5	Michael Wiley	So

Defense

Pos.	#	Name	Class
S	1	Gary Berry	So
DT	73	Joe Brown	Fr
LB	32	Na'il Diggs	So
LB	45	Andy Katzenmoyer	So
SS	13	Damon Moore	Jr
CB	19	Ahmed Plummer	So
CB	11	Antoine Winfield	Jr

Special teams

Pos.	#	Name	Class

Head coach

- John Cooper

Coordinators/assistant coaches

Legend

- (C) Team captain
- (S) Suspended
- (I) Ineligible
- Injured
- Redshirt

== NFL draft ==
For the first time since the NFL draft's inception in 1936, no Ohio State players were selected in the 1998 NFL draft.
