= Scott Shaw (American football) =

American football player (born 1974)

No. 68
- Position: Guard

Personal information
- Born: June 2, 1974 (age 52); Detroit, Michigan, U.S.
- Listed height: 6 ft 3 in (1.91 m)
- Listed weight: 303 lb (137 kg)

Career information
- High school: Henry Ford II (Sterling Heights, Michigan)
- College: Michigan State
- NFL draft: 1998: 5th round, 143rd overall pick

Career history
- Miami Dolphins (1998)*; Cincinnati Bengals (1998); New Orleans Saints (1999)*
- * Offseason or practice squad member only

Career NFL statistics
- Games played: 2
- Stats at Pro Football Reference

Scott Harold Shaw (born June 2, 1974) is an American former professional football player who was a guard for the Cincinnati Bengals of the National Football League (NFL). He played college football for the Michigan State Spartans. He was selected by the Miami Dolphins in the 1998 NFL draft.
