= 1997 Purdue Boilermakers football team =

American college football season

1997 Purdue Boilermakers football

Alamo Bowl champion

Alamo Bowl, W 33–20 vs. Oklahoma State
- Conference: Big Ten Conference

Ranking
- Coaches: No. 15
- AP: No. 15
- Record: 9–3 (6–2 Big Ten)
- Head coach: Joe Tiller (1st season)
- Offensive coordinator: Jim Chaney (1st season)
- Co-offensive coordinator: Tim Lappano (1st season)
- Offensive scheme: Spread
- Defensive coordinator: Brock Spack (1st season)
- Base defense: 4–3
- Captains: Brian Alford; Rosevelt Colvin; Mark Fischer
- Home stadium: Ross–Ade Stadium

1997 Big Ten Conference football standings
	Conf.			Overall
Team	W		L	W		L
No. 1 Michigan $	8	–	0	12	–	0
No. 12 Ohio State	6	–	2	10	–	3
No. 16 Penn State	6	–	2	9	–	3
No. 15 Purdue	6	–	2	9	–	3
Wisconsin	5	–	3	8	–	5
Iowa	4	–	4	7	–	5
Michigan State	4	–	4	7	–	5
Northwestern	3	–	5	5	–	7
Minnesota	1	–	7	3	–	9
Indiana	1	–	7	2	–	9
Illinois	0	–	8	0	–	11
$ – Conference champion; Rankings from AP Poll

The 1997 Purdue Boilermakers football team represented Purdue University as a member of the Big Ten Conference during the 1997 NCAA Division I-A football season. Led by first-year head coach Joe Tiller, the Boilermakers compiled an overall record of 9–3 with a mark of 6–2 in conference play, placing in a three-way tie in the Big Ten. Purdue had its best season since 1980. The team played home games at Ross–Ade Stadium in West Lafayette, Indiana.

== Schedule ==
Date	Time	Opponent	Rank	Site	TV	Result	Attendance
September 6	6:00 pm	at Toledo*		Glass Bowl; Toledo, OH (Food Town Kickoff II)		L 22–36	27,700
September 13	2:30 pm	No. 12 Notre Dame*		Ross–Ade Stadium; West Lafayette, IN (rivalry)	ABC	W 28–17	68,789
September 20	1:00 pm	Ball State*		Ross–Ade Stadium; West Lafayette, IN		W 28–14	45,947
September 27	11:30 am	Northwestern		Ross–Ade Stadium; West Lafayette, IN	ESPN	W 21–9	42,112
October 11	6:00 pm	at Minnesota		Hubert H. Humphrey Metrodome; Minneapolis, MN	ESPN Plus	W 59–43	37,821
October 18	1:00 pm	No. 24 Wisconsin^{†}		Ross–Ade Stadium; West Lafayette, IN		W 45–20	54,252
October 25	1:00 pm	at Illinois	No. 22	Memorial Stadium; Champaign, IL (rivalry)		W 48–3	45,122
November 1	12:30 pm	at No. 15 Iowa	No. 18	Kinnick Stadium; Iowa City, IA	ESPN2	L 17–35	70,397
November 8	12:30 pm	Michigan State	No. 23	Ross–Ade Stadium; West Lafayette, IN	ESPN2	W 22–21	55,539
November 15	12:00 pm	No. 6 Penn State	No. 19	Ross–Ade Stadium; West Lafayette, IN	ESPN	L 17–42	52,156
November 22	1:00 pm	at Indiana	No. 23	Memorial Stadium; Bloomington, IN (Old Oaken Bucket)		W 56–7	46,599
December 30	8:00 pm	No. 24 Oklahoma State*	No. 17	Alamodome; San Antonio, TX (Alamo Bowl)	ESPN	W 33–20	55,552
*Non-conference game; ^{†}Homecoming; Rankings from AP Poll released prior to the game; All times are in Eastern time

== Rankings ==
Ranking movements Legend: ██ Increase in ranking ██ Decrease in ranking — = Not ranked т = Tied with team above or below
	Week																	
Poll	Pre	1	2	3	4	5	6	7	8	9	10	11	12	13	14	15	16	Final
AP	—	—	—	—	—	—	—	—	—	22	18	23	19т	23	18	18	17	15
Coaches	—		—	—	—	—	—	—	—	23	18	24	20	25	18	17	16	15

== Game summaries ==
=== Toledo ===
Purdue at Toledo

Team	1	2	3	4	Total
Purdue	7	7	0	8	22
• Toledo	21	6	3	6	36

- Date: September 6
- Location: Glass Bowl, Toledo, OH
- Game attendance: 26,700

Scoring summary
1	PUR	Watson 45-yard run (Ryan kick)	PUR 7-0
1	TOL	Reynolds 1-yard run (Merrick kick)	Tied 7-7
1	TOL	Harris 5-yard run (Merrick kick)	TOL 14-7
1	TOL	Freeman 29-yard pass from Wallace (Merrick kick)	TOL 21-7
2	TOL	Merrick 25-yard field goal	TOL 24-7
2	TOL	Merrick 37-yard field goal	TOL 27-7
2	PUR	Alford 73-yard pass from Dicken (Ryan kick)	TOL 27-14
3	TOL	Merrick 21-yard field goal	TOL 30-14
4	TOL	Kreitzburg 6-yard pass from Wallace (two-point failed)	TOL 36-14
4	PUR	Sutherland 5-yard run (Watson rund)	TOL 36-22

Joe Tiller's first game as Purdue head coach

=== Notre Dame ===
Notre Dame at Purdue

Team	1	2	3	4	Total
Notre Dame	0	10	0	7	17
• Purdue	7	7	0	14	28

- Date: September 13
- Location: Ross–Ade Stadium, West Lafayette, IN
- Game attendance: 68,789

Scoring summary
1	PUR	Edwin Watson 1-yard run (Ryan kick)	PUR 7-0
2	ND	Sanson 34-yard field goal	PUR 7-3
2	PUR	Edwin Watson 1-yard run (Ryan kick)	PUR 14-3
2	ND	Autry Denson 16-yard run (Sanson kick)	PUR 14-10
4	PUR	Adrian Beasley 43-yard fumble return (Ryan kick)	PUR 21-10
4	ND	Autry Denson 1-yard pass from Ron Powlus (Sanson kick)	PUR 21-17
4	PUR	Kendall Matthews 3-yard run (Ryan kick)	PUR 28-17

In Joe Tiller's first home game, Purdue snapped an 11-game losing streak to Notre Dame as fans tore down the goalposts after the victory. Edwin Watson, who had two touchdown runs, had said earlier in the week that former head coach and new Irish offensive coordinator Jim Colletto "was used to losing here (Purdue), so it would be nothing new for him."

=== Ball State ===
Ball State at Purdue

Team	1	2	3	4	Total
Ball State	0	7	0	7	14
• Purdue	3	10	15	0	28

- Date: September 20
- Location: Ross-Ade Stadium, West Lafayette, IN
- Game attendance: 45,947

=== Northwestern ===
Northwestern at Purdue

Team	1	2	3	4	Total
Northwestern	3	6	0	0	9
• Purdue	7	7	7	0	21

- Date: September 27
- Location: Ross–Ade Stadium, West Lafayette, IN
- Game attendance: 42,112

- Kendall Matthews 29 rushes, 152 yards

=== Minnesota ===
Purdue at Minnesota

Team	1	2	3	4	Total
• Purdue	17	21	14	7	59
Minnesota	14	7	7	15	43

- Date: October 11
- Location: Hubert H. Humphrey Metrodome, Minneapolis, MN

Scoring summary
Q1	10:31	MINN	Nelson 31 yard pass from Atwell (Bailey kick)	MINN 7−0
Q1	10:03	PUR	Watson 65 yard pass from Dicken (Ryan kick)	Tie 7–7
Q1	6:30	PUR	Ryan 32 yard field goal	PUR 10–7
Q1	3:21	PUR	Matthews 33 yard run (Ryan kick)	PUR 17–7
Q1	0:23	MINN	Duerr 3 yard pass from Sauter (Bailey kick)	PUR 17–14
Q2	8:05	PUR	Watson 21 yard pass from Dicken (Ryan kick)	PUR 24–14
Q2	5:07	MINN	Wyrick 42 yard pass from Rindels (Bailey kick)	PUR 24–21
Q2	4:45	PUR	Alford 93 yard pass from Dicken (Ryan kick)	PUR 31–21
Q2	1:36	PUR	Watson 1 yard run (Ryan kick)	PUR 38–21
Q3	13:53	MINN	Evans 45 yard run (Bailey kick)	PUR 38–28
Q3	10:11	PUR	Dicken 11 yard run (Ryan kick)	PUR 45–28
Q3	1:33	PUR	Alford 89 yard pass from Dicken (Ryan kick)	PUR 52–28
Q4	9:40	PUR	Jones 4 yard pass from Dicken (Ryan kick)	PUR 59–28
Q4	7:21	MINN	Atwell 46 yard pass from Cockerham (Bailey kick)	PUR 59–35
Q4	0:38	MINN	Bean 1 yard run (Bean run)	PUR 59–43

- Purdue's first win in Minneapolis since 1983.

=== Wisconsin ===
Wisconsin at Purdue
Homecoming

Team	1	2	3	4	Total
Wisconsin	0	10	7	3	20
• Purdue	21	7	7	10	45

- Date: October 18
- Location: Ross–Ade Stadium, West Lafayette, IN

With the win over Wisconsin, Purdue is off to its best start since 1978 and produced their first five-game winning streak since 1980.

=== Illinois ===
Purdue at Illinois

Team	1	2	3	4	Total
• Purdue	14	20	7	7	48
Illinois	0	3	0	0	3

- Date: October 25
- Location: Memorial Stadium
  Champaign, IL
- Game attendance: 45,122

- Kendall Matthews 16 rushes, 177 yards

=== Iowa ===
Purdue at Iowa

Team	1	2	3	4	Total
Purdue	10	7	0	0	17
• Iowa	0	14	21	0	35

- Date: November 1
- Location: Kinnick Stadium
  Iowa City, IA
- Game attendance: 70,397

=== Michigan State ===
Michigan State at Purdue

Team	1	2	3	4	Total
Michigan State	7	7	0	7	21
• Purdue	0	7	0	15	22

- Date: November 8
- Location: Ross–Ade Stadium
  West Lafayette, IN
- Game attendance: 55,539

- Edwin Watson 24 rushes, 115 yards

=== Penn State ===
Penn State at Purdue

Team	1	2	3	4	Total
• Penn State	0	14	14	14	42
Purdue	0	9	0	8	17

- Date: November 15
- Location: Ross–Ade Stadium
  West Lafayette, IN
- Game attendance: 52,156

- Edwin Watson 19 rushes, 133 yards

=== Indiana ===
Purdue at Indiana

Team	1	2	3	4	Total
• Purdue	14	7	7	28	56
Indiana	0	7	0	0	7

- Date: November 22
- Location: Memorial Stadium
  Bloomington, IN
- Game attendance: 46,599

Scoring summary
1	PUR	Watson 14 yard run (Ryan kick)	PUR 7–0
1	PUR	Dicken 6 yard run (Ryan kick)	PUR 14–0
2	IND	Conner 42 yard pass from Rodgers (Payne kick)	PUR 14–7
2	PUR	L. Johnson 35 yard fumble return (Ryan kick)	PUR 21–7
3	PUR	Watson 48 yard run (Ryan kick)	PUR 28–7
4	PUR	I. Jones 16 yard pass from Dicken (Ryan kick)	PUR 35–7
4	PUR	Rose 24 yard interception return (Ryan kick)	PUR 42–7
4	PUR	Brees 5 yard run (Ryan kick)	PUR 49–7
4	PUR	Graham 49 yard run (Ryan kick)	PUR 56–7

- Edwin Watson 18 rushes, 163 yards

=== Oklahoma State ===
Oklahoma State vs. Purdue
Alamo Bowl

Team	1	2	3	4	Total
• Purdue	7	3	20	3	33
Oklahoma State	3	3	7	7	20

- Date: December 30
- Location: Alamodome
  San Antonio, TX
- Game attendance: 55,552

== Personnel ==
=== Roster ===
1997 Purdue Boilermakers football team roster
Players
Coaches
Offense

Pos.	#	Name	Class
WR	1	Donald Winston	So
QB	3	John Reeves	Sr
WR	5	Willie Tillman	Sr
WR	6	Isaac Jones	Sr
WR	52	Fahim Chesti	So
QB	12	Billy Dicken	Sr
WR	20	Chris Daniels	So
RB	36	Edwin Watson	Sr
RB	43	Kendall Matthews	Sr
OT	54	Mark Fischer	Sr
G	56	Chukky Okobi	Fr
OT	76	Dan Maly	Sr
G	78	Brian Nicely	Jr
WR	80	Brian Alford	Sr
TE	81	Brandon Jewell	Sr
TE	84	Jon Blackmon	Sr
WR	88	Jason Loerzel	Fr

Defense

Pos.	#	Name	Class
FS	2	Derrick Brown	Sr
LB	4	Mike Rose	So
SS	7	Adrian Beasley	So
SS	10	Lee Brush	Sr
CB	11	Michael Hawthorne	So
CB	14	Jamel Coleman	Sr
CB	28	Henry Bell	Jr
DE	49	Chukie Nwokorie	Jr
DE	58	Warren Moore	Fr
DE	59	Rosevelt Colvin	Jr
DT	71	Anthony Gutwein	Jr
DT	82	David Nugent	So
DE	87	Rocco Foggio	Fr
DT	97	Greg Smith	Sr
DT	98	Leo Perez	Sr

Special teams

Pos.	#	Name	Class
PK	22	Aaron Bunten	Fr
P	26	Danny Rogers	So
LS	60	Andy Standifer	So
P	92	Brandon Kaser	Jr
PK	96	Shane Ryan	So

Head coach

- Joe Tiller

Coordinators/assistant coaches

- Tim Burke (defensive backs)
- Jim Chaney (offensive coordinator)
- Scott Downing

Legend

- (C) Team captain
- (S) Suspended
- (I) Ineligible
- Injured
- Redshirt

Roster
Last update: November 28, 2016

=== Coaching staff ===
- Head coach: Joe Tiller
- Assistants: Tim Burke, Jim Chaney, Scott Downing, Gary Emanuel, Danny Hope, Larry Korpitz, Tim Lappano, Randy Melvin, Greg Olson, Brock Spack

=== Starters ===
- Offense: WR Brian Alford, WR Gabe Cox, LT Mark Fischer, WR F Chesti, LG Brian Nicely, C Jim Niedrach, RG Chukky Okobi, RT Dan Maly, TE Jon Blackman, WR Isaac Jones, QB Billy Dicken, RB Edwin Watson, K Shane Ryan
- Defense: LE Chukie Nwokorie, LT Leo Perez, RT Greg Smith, RE Rosevelt Colvin, WLB Willie Burroughs, MLB Willie Fells, SLB Mike Rose, LCB Michael Hawthorne, FS Adrian Beasley, SS Lee Brush, RCB Lamar Conrad, P Brandon Kaser

== Awards ==
- All-Americans: Brian Alford (Football News)
- All-Big Ten: Brian Alford (1st), Rosevelt Colvin (2nd), Billy Dicken (1st)
