= Cam Cameron =

American football player and coach (born 1961)

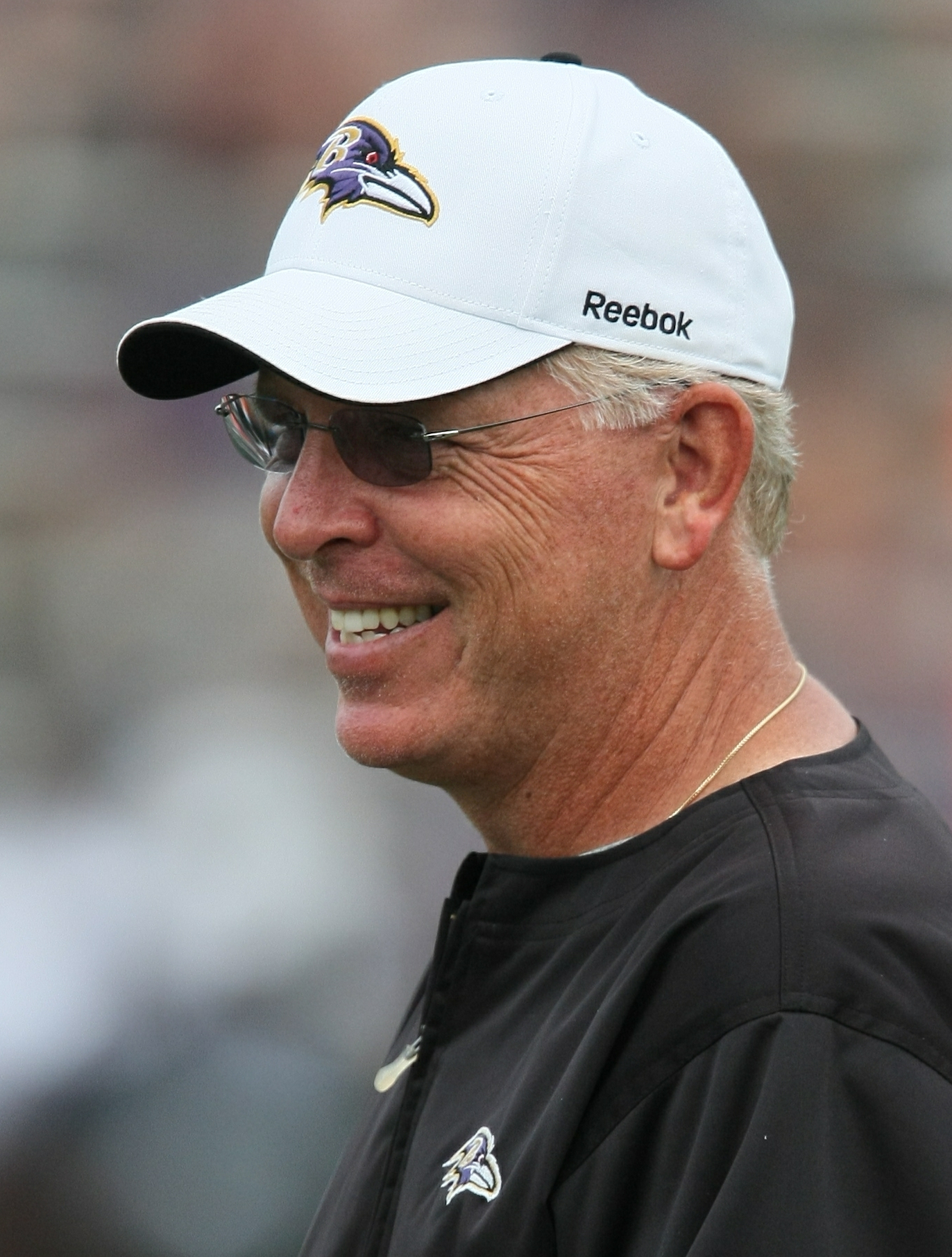
- Cameron as offensive coordinator for the Baltimore Ravens in 2012

Biographical details
- Born: February 6, 1961 (age 65); Chapel Hill, North Carolina, U.S.
- Height: 6 ft 2 in (188 cm)

Playing career
- 1981–1983: Indiana
- Position: Quarterback

Coaching career (HC unless noted)
- 1984–1985: Michigan (GA)
- 1986–1989: Michigan (WR)
- 1990–1993: Michigan (WR/QB)
- 1994–1996: Washington Redskins (QB)
- 1997–2001: Indiana
- 2002–2006: San Diego Chargers (OC)
- 2007: Miami Dolphins
- 2008–2012: Baltimore Ravens (OC)
- 2013–2016: LSU (OC/QB)

Head coaching record
- Overall: 18–37 (college); 1–15 (NFL)

Malcolm "Cam" Cameron (born February 6, 1961) is an American football coach who was most recently the offensive coordinator and quarterbacks coach of the LSU Tigers football program. Cameron attended Indiana University in Bloomington, Indiana and played quarterback for the school. Cameron began his coaching career in the NCAA with the Michigan Wolverines. After that he switched to the National Football League (NFL), where he was offensive coordinator for the Baltimore Ravens and the San Diego Chargers and head coach for the Miami Dolphins, coaching them to a 1–15 record in his only season.

== Early years and education ==
Cameron was born February 6, 1961, in Chapel Hill, North Carolina. A multi-sport athlete, Cameron was an All-American quarterback at Terre Haute South Vigo High School in Terre Haute, Indiana. Prior to his time at Terre Haute South, he attended Saint Patrick School Catholic Elementary School. He won the 1979 Trester Award for mental attitude as a guard on the high school basketball team which went to the state finals three years in a row. He played football and basketball at Indiana University under coaches Lee Corso and Bob Knight, respectively, until a knee injury ended his playing career. As an undergraduate, he was a member of Kappa Sigma fraternity. He graduated from Indiana in 1983 with a bachelor's degree in business.

== Coaching career ==
=== Michigan ===
Cameron spent the first ten years of his career at the University of Michigan, where he learned from long-time Wolverine coach Bo Schembechler. After two years as a graduate assistant, he became Michigan's youngest assistant and was responsible for tutoring quarterbacks and receivers. He coached many future NFL players, including Jim Harbaugh, Elvis Grbac, Todd Collins, Amani Toomer, Derrick Alexander and Heisman Trophy winner Desmond Howard. Cameron served as an assistant at Michigan alongside future head coaches Lloyd Carr, Gary Moeller, Les Miles, and Mike DeBord. His fellow graduate assistant was Mike Trgovac, who was the former defensive line coach of the Green Bay Packers, after serving six years as the defensive coordinator of the Carolina Panthers.

=== Washington Redskins ===
Cameron was the quarterbacks coach for the Washington Redskins between 1994 and 1996. He is credited with guiding quarterback Gus Frerotte to his only Pro Bowl appearance in 1997, and also played a key role in the development of Pro Bowl quarterback Trent Green.

=== Return to Indiana ===
Cameron returned to his alma mater to serve as the head coach for the Indiana University Hoosiers in 1997. He was fired after the 2001 season.

=== San Diego Chargers ===
From 2002 to 2006, he served as the offensive coordinator for the San Diego Chargers. In 2004, San Diego scored 446 points, third-highest in the NFL that year and the third-most in team history. Following the 2004 campaign, Sports Illustrated named Cameron its Offensive Assistant of the Year. In 2005, the Chargers averaged 26.1 points per game, fifth in the NFL in that category. In 2006, the Chargers offense amassed a team-record 494 points while paving the way for league MVP LaDainian Tomlinson to break the single-season touchdown record. In addition to Tomlinson, Cameron had the opportunity to work with Pro Bowl quarterbacks Drew Brees and Philip Rivers, as well as All-Pro tight end Antonio Gates in San Diego. He brought in former Hoosier Kris Dielman as left guard.

=== Miami Dolphins ===
Cameron was interviewed for a number of head coaching jobs, including the Houston Texans and St. Louis Rams vacancies following the 2006 season but was not hired. Cameron also interviewed for the head coaching jobs with the Arizona Cardinals and Atlanta Falcons in January 2007 but Miami was the only club that made an offer.

By the time Cameron arrived, the Dolphins were coming off the abrupt resignation of their head coach Nick Saban, despite repeatedly saying he would stay in Miami and denied rumors of him taking the Alabama head coaching job. Cameron's 2007 Dolphins lost 13 consecutive games to start the season, before beating the Baltimore Ravens in overtime on December 16 for their first and only win of the year. The Dolphins ended the 2007 season in last place in the AFC East with a franchise-worst 1–15 record, the worst record in the NFL that year and the worst in the team's 40-year history. On January 3, 2008, newly hired general manager Jeff Ireland announced Cameron had been fired along with most of his staff.

=== Baltimore Ravens ===
On January 23, 2008, Baltimore Ravens head coach John Harbaugh announced Cameron as the Ravens’ new offensive coordinator. Following a loss to the Washington Redskins in Week 14 of the 2012 NFL season, Cameron was released by the Ravens and replaced by Jim Caldwell. At the time of his release, he had helped the Ravens attain a 9–4 record.

After Cameron's firing, the Ravens went on to win Super Bowl XLVII against the San Francisco 49ers. Despite being fired as offensive coordinator after week 14, head coach of the Ravens John Harbaugh stated that Cameron deserved and would receive a Super Bowl ring, having helped the team for a majority of the season to get to the playoffs.

=== LSU ===
On February 8, 2013, LSU hired Cameron as offensive coordinator, replacing Greg Studrawa. The move reunited him with head coach Les Miles.

Entering 2013, Cameron had immediate success, as his LSU offense averaged 46 points in the first six games of the regular season. The Tiger offense finished the season 34th in the country in passing yards at 265.1 per game, 32nd in rushing yards at 200.8, 22nd points for at 37.0, and 32nd in total offense (LSU's best since 2007) at 5591 yards of total offense and a total average of 465.9 yards per game. Cameron has also been widely praised for the development of redshirt senior quarterback Zach Mettenberger who had the best season of his LSU career with a 64.9% completion percentage, and a 22–8 touchdown to interception ratio, a notable improvement over past seasons.

LSU fired Miles on September 25, 2016, after a 2–2 start to the season. Interim head coach Ed Orgeron did not retain Cameron, and promoted tight ends coach Steve Ensminger instead.

== Head coaching record ==
=== College ===
Year	Team	Overall	Conference	Standing	Bowl/playoffs
Indiana Hoosiers (Big Ten Conference) (1997–2001)
1997	Indiana	2–9	1–7	T–9th	
1998	Indiana	4–7	2–6	T–7th	
1999	Indiana	4–7	3–5	T–8th	
2000	Indiana	3–8	2–6	T–9th	
2001	Indiana	5–6	4–4	T–4th	
Indiana:		18–37	12–28		
Total:		18–37			

=== NFL ===
Team	Year	Regular season					Postseason			
Team	Year	Won	Lost	Ties	Win %	Finish	Won	Lost	Win %	Result
MIA	2007	1	15	0	.063	4th in AFC East	–	–	–	–
Total		1	15	0	.063					

== Family ==
Cameron's stepfather is retired football coach Tom Harp.
