= 1997 Southern Miss Golden Eagles football team =

American college football season

1997 Southern Miss Golden Eagles football

Conference USA champion Liberty Bowl champion

Liberty Bowl, W 41–7 vs. Pittsburgh
- Conference: Conference USA

Ranking
- Coaches: No. 19
- AP: No. 19
- Record: 9–3 (6–0 C-USA)
- Head coach: Jeff Bower (8th season)
- Offensive coordinator: Larry Kueck (1st season)
- Offensive scheme: Multiple
- Defensive coordinator: John Thompson (6th season)
- Base defense: Multiple
- Home stadium: M. M. Roberts Stadium

1997 Conference USA football standings
	Conf.			Overall
Team	W		L	W		L
No. 19 Southern Miss $	6	–	0	9	–	3
Tulane	5	–	1	7	–	4
East Carolina	4	–	2	5	–	6
Cincinnati	2	–	4	8	–	4
Memphis	2	–	4	4	–	7
Houston	2	–	4	3	–	8
Louisville	0	–	6	1	–	10
$ – Conference champion; Rankings from AP Poll

The 1997 Southern Miss Golden Eagles football team represented the University of Southern Mississippi in the 1997 NCAA Division I-A football season. The Golden Eagles were led by eighth-year head coach Jeff Bower and played their home games at M. M. Roberts Stadium. In their second year in the Conference USA, they claimed their second-straight conference championship with a 6–0 C-USA record and a 9–3 record overall. They were invited to the 1997 Liberty Bowl, where they defeated Pittsburgh, 41–7. In the final AP and Coaches Polls of the season, the Golden Eagles were ranked 19th, which was the first ranked finish in school history.

== Schedule ==
Date	Opponent	Rank	Site	TV	Result	Attendance	Source
August 30	at No. 2 Florida*		Ben Hill Griffin Stadium; Gainesville, FL		L 6–21	85,439	
September 6	at Illinois*		Memorial Stadium; Champaign, IL	ESPN2	W 24–7	44,519	
September 20	Nevada*		M. M. Roberts Stadium; Hattiesburg, MS		W 35–19	26,481	
September 27	at No. 21 Alabama*		Legion Field; Birmingham, AL	PPV	L 13–27	83,091	
October 4	Louisville		M. M. Roberts Stadium; Hattiesburg, MS		W 42–24	23,028	
October 11	at East Carolina		Dowdy–Ficklen Stadium; Greenville, NC		W 23–13	33,904	
October 25	Tulane^{†}		M. M. Roberts Stadium; Hattiesburg, MS (rivalry)		W 34–13	26,092	
November 1	at Cincinnati	No. 24	Nippert Stadium; Cincinnati, OH		W 24–17	23,799	
November 8	at No. 8 Tennessee*	No. 24	Neyland Stadium; Knoxville, TN	PPV	L 20–44	107,073	
November 15	Houston		M. M. Roberts Stadium; Hattiesburg, MS		W 33–0	20,091	
November 22	at Memphis		Liberty Bowl Memorial Stadium; Memphis, TN (Black and Blue Bowl)		W 42–18	17,243	
December 31	vs. Pittsburgh*	No. 22	Liberty Bowl Memorial Stadium; Memphis, TN (Liberty Bowl)	ESPN	W 41–7	50,209	
*Non-conference game; ^{†}Homecoming; Rankings from AP Poll released prior to the game

== Rankings ==
Ranking movements Legend: ██ Increase in ranking ██ Decrease in ranking — = Not ranked
	Week																	
Poll	Pre	1	2	3	4	5	6	7	8	9	10	11	12	13	14	15	16	Final
AP	—	—	—	—	—	—	—	—	—	—	24	24	—	—	23	22	22	19
Coaches	—		—	—	—	—	—	—	—	—	—	25	—	—	24	23	22	19
