= 1998 Rose Bowl =

American college football game

- 84th Rose Bowl Game
Washington State Cougars	Michigan Wolverines
(10–1)	(11–0)
16	21
Head coach: Mike Price	Head coach: Lloyd Carr
AP / Coaches / BA; 8 / 7 / 8	AP / Coaches / BA; 1 / 1 / 1
	1	2	3	4	Total
Washington State	7	0	6	3	16
Michigan	0	7	7	7	21
- Date: January 1, 1998
- Season: 1997
- Stadium: Rose Bowl Stadium
- Location: Pasadena, California
- MVP: Brian Griese (Michigan QB)
- Favorite: Michigan by 7 points
- National anthem: Washington State University Cougar Marching Band
- Referee: Dick Burleson (SEC)
- Halftime show: Washington State Cougar Marching Band, Michigan Marching Band
- Attendance: 101,219

United States TV coverage
- Network: ABC
- Announcers: Keith Jackson (play-by-play); Bob Griese (analyst); Lynn Swann (sideline)

The 1998 Rose Bowl was a college football bowl game, part of the 1997–98 college bowl season, played on January 1 at the Rose Bowl in Pasadena, California. The 84th Rose Bowl Game, it featured top-ranked Michigan beating Washington State 21–16, and Wolverine quarterback Brian Griese was named the Rose Bowl Player of the Game. The next Rose Bowl was part of the newly formed Bowl Championship Series (BCS). This was also the final year that the game was not branded with corporate sponsorship.

This was the last time Michigan won the Rose Bowl until 2024, when they defeated the Alabama Crimson Tide 27–20.

== Pre-game activities ==
On Tuesday, October 21, 1997 - Tournament of Roses President Gareth A. Dorn chooses 17-year-old Purdy Tran, a senior at Westridge School & a resident of Arcadia, California, to become the 80th Rose Queen to reign over the 109th Rose Parade and the 84th Rose Bowl Game. Miss Tran is the 1st Vietnamese-American young woman to capture the title in royal court history.

The game was presided over by the 1998 Tournament of Roses Royal Court and Rose Parade Grand Marshal Carol Burnett. Members of the royal court are: Princesses Grace Huang, San Marino, San Marino High School; Kristen Kneier, San Marino, San Marino High School; Leslie Marrero, Pasadena, John Muir High School; Lauren Poindexter, La Canada Flintridge, La Canada High School; Amber Ross, Pasadena, Blair High School; and Kate Sargeant, La Canada Flintridge, Blair High School.

== Teams ==
=== Michigan Wolverines ===
Michigan earned the right to play in the 84th Rose Bowl game by going through the entire regular season undefeated. With a dominating defense led by Heisman Trophy-winning cornerback Charles Woodson and All-American defensive end Glen Steele and a resourceful offense led by quarterback Brian Griese, the Wolverines went 11–0, yielding only 144 points. Lloyd Carr was in his third season as the head coach. They defeated preseason top 5 Colorado, 27–3 in the season opener on September 13. Michigan defeated Notre Dame, 21–14 on September 27. Two-time Big Ten champion Northwestern was a 23-6 victim on October 11. The Iowa game on October 18 was the closest call as the Wolverines trailed 21–7 at halftime before rallying to win 28–24. Michigan stormed into Spartan Stadium on October 25 and subdued the Michigan State Spartans 23–7. On November 8, a day termed "Judgment Day", Michigan went on the road and dominated undefeated #3 Penn State 34–8. On November 22, it was #1 (Michigan) vs. #4 (Ohio State) for the right to represent the Big Ten in the Rose Bowl. Thanks to an interception returned for a touchdown and a Charles Woodson 77-yard punt return for a touchdown, Michigan defeated Ohio State 20–14 to finish 11–0, 8–0. The Wolverines entered the Rose Bowl ranked #1 in the AP and coaches' poll. With the 21-16 Rose Bowl win over Washington State, the Wolverines would claim the Associated Press (AP) national championship, as well as the Grantland Rice Award (Football Writers Association of America) and MacArthur Bowl (National Football Foundation and Hall of Fame trophy).

=== Washington State Cougars ===
Washington State hadn't played in the Rose Bowl Game since it lost to Alabama in the 1931 edition—a 67-year absence. But the Cougars, led by high-profile quarterback Ryan Leaf, ended that streak mainly to their first game of the 1997 season.

In the opener, the Cougars stormed out to a big lead over the UCLA Bruins and held them off with a goal-line stand in the closing minutes to win 37–34. WSU followed that with a 28–21 win over the USC Trojans, the Cougars' first win in the Los Angeles Coliseum in many years. The Cougars also survived an overtime thriller against the Arizona Wildcats, winning 35–34 when Arizona chose to go for a two-point conversion attempt and failed. WSU's perfect season was ruined in a 44–31 loss at Arizona State, but the Cougars cemented their Rose Bowl bid with a 41–35 victory over the rival Washington Huskies, their first Apple Cup win in Seattle in a dozen years.

On New Year's Eve, Cougar head coach Mike Price was bedridden with the flu. While Leaf was their best player (he'd declare himself for the 1998 NFL draft on January 2), they also received important contributions from their wide receiving corps, better known as the Fab Five: Kevin McKenzie, Shawn McWashington, Shawn Tims, Chris Jackson and Nian Taylor. WSU also had a tremendous running back in Michael Black and a future NFL offensive lineman in Cory Withrow. On the defensive side, linemen Dorian Boose and Leon Bender both became NFL draftees in April, though Bender died in late May. Linebacker Steve Gleason and safety Lamont Thompson also went on to play in the NFL.

== Game summary ==
In the first quarter, Washington State downed a punt at the 1 and forced a punt without a first down. After regaining possession at the Wolverines 47, Leaf connected with McKenzie on a 15-yard play to take a 7–0 lead with 3:07 remaining in the quarter. Michigan moved the ball to the Washington State 37 before punting. Leaf marched the Cougars to the Michigan 14, but Woodson intercepted him in the end zone. The teams traded punts before Griese found Streets in stride on the right sideline for a 53-yard touchdown pass to tie the game with 7:08 left in the first half.

Leaf opened the second half with a 99-yard drive for a go-ahead touchdown. Key plays on the drive included a 19-yard completion to Shawn McWashington, completions to Kevin McKenzie for 30 and 20 yards, and Shawn Tims' 14-yard touchdown on a reverse play with 8:33 remaining in the third quarter. The extra point was blocked, leaving the Cougars with a 13–7 lead. On the ensuing possession, Michigan mixed four runs by Howard with a pair of short passes to Shaw before Griese found Streets for a 58-yard play-action pass touchdown to take a 14–13 lead with 5:07 left. After a punt by Washington State, Griese led a 14-play 77-yard drive that ended with a Tuman 23-yard play-action touchdown pass with 11:21 to go for a 21–13 lead.

In the fourth quarter, Leaf converted a 3rd-and-18 play from his own 12 by connecting with McKenzie for 19 yards. Then a 42-yard pass to DeJuan Gilmore moved the ball to the Michigan 27. Washington State settled for a Rian Lindell 48-yard field goal with 7:25 to play to make the score 21–16. Michigan's ensuing drive consumed most of the clock with the help of four consecutive third down conversions: a 3rd-and-11 Griese scramble to the Michigan 29; a 3rd-and-7 lateral to Woodson who faked a pass before running eight yards to keep the drive alive; on 3rd-and-6 a 13-yard pass to Shaw; and a 3rd-and-7 pass to Woodson taking the ball to the Washington State 33. A pooch punt by Feely from field goal formation left Washington State on its own 7-yard-line with 29 seconds remaining and no timeouts. After two incompletions, Leaf completed a 46-yard pass to Nian Taylor to move the ball to the Michigan 47. Washington State drew an illegal formation penalty with nine seconds remaining, but executed a hook and lateral play for 26 yards to the Michigan 26, with an 8-yard catch by Love Jefferson and an 18-yard run by Jason Clayton, who was tackled by Weathers and Jones. With two seconds to play, the clock was stopped to move the chains. With no timeouts left, Leaf spiked the football, but although there appeared to be one second remaining on the clock, Dick Burleson, the referee from the Southeastern Conference crew, shook his head as Leaf contested the decision. Michigan's victory evened the series between the Pac-10 and Big Ten in the Rose Bowl at 26 wins apiece.

== Aftermath ==
The next year, the Rose Bowl game would become part of the Bowl Championship Series. This would give a greater chance of the number one and number two teams meeting. Michigan was named the college football national champion for the 1997 football season in the AP poll. In the coaches poll, undefeated Nebraska (which defeated #3 Tennessee 42–17 in the Orange Bowl) was voted #1; Michigan had entered the Rose Bowl first in both polls, and were favored to beat the Cougars by seven points. Michigan would not win the national championship again until 2023.

This was the last Rose Bowl game with an attendance of over 100,000. The stadium was modified following the game to widen the playing field for soccer in preparation for the 1999 FIFA Women's World Cup and remove lower seats that were blocked by players on the sidelines.
