= 1997 Cincinnati Bearcats football team =

American college football season

1997 Cincinnati Bearcats football

Humanitarian Bowl, W 35–19 vs. Utah State
- Conference: Conference USA
- Record: 8–4 (2–4 C-USA)
- Head coach: Rick Minter (4th season)
- Offensive coordinator: Greg Seamon (3rd season)
- Offensive scheme: Pro-style
- Defensive coordinator: Rex Ryan (2nd season)
- Base defense: 3–4 or 4–3
- Home stadium: Nippert Stadium

1997 Conference USA football standings
	Conf.			Overall
Team	W		L	W		L
No. 19 Southern Miss $	6	–	0	9	–	3
Tulane	5	–	1	7	–	4
East Carolina	4	–	2	5	–	6
Cincinnati	2	–	4	8	–	4
Memphis	2	–	4	4	–	7
Houston	2	–	4	3	–	8
Louisville	0	–	6	1	–	10
$ – Conference champion; Rankings from AP Poll

The 1997 Cincinnati Bearcats football team represented the University of Cincinnati in the 1997 NCAA Division I-A football season. The team, coached by Rick Minter, played their home games in Nippert Stadium, as it has since 1924.

== Schedule ==
Date	Time	Opponent	Site	TV	Result	Attendance	Source
August 28		Tulsa*	Nippert Stadium; Cincinnati, OH		W 34–24	17,591	
September 6		at Tulane	Louisiana Superdome; New Orleans, LA		L 17–31	20,828	
September 20	7:00 pm	Kansas*	Nippert Stadium; Cincinnati, OH		W 34–7	17,636	
September 27	6:00 pm	at Boston College*	Alumni Stadium; Boston, MA	ESPN2	W 24–6	40,564	
October 4		Memphis	Nippert Stadium; Cincinnati, OH (rivalry)		W 20–17	19,511	
October 11	7:00 pm	UAB*	Nippert Stadium; Cincinnati, OH		W 33–29	20,924	
October 18		at Houston	Robertson Stadium; Houston, TX		L 38–41 ^{2OT}	14,457	
October 25		at Miami (OH)*	Yager Stadium; Oxford, OH (Victory Bell)		W 34–31 ^{2OT}		
November 1		No. 24 Southern Miss	Nippert Stadium; Cincinnati, OH		L 17–24	23,799	
November 8	3:30 pm	Louisville	Nippert Stadium; Cincinnati, OH (Keg of Nails)		W 28–9	21,346	
November 13	8:00 pm	at East Carolina	Dowdy–Ficklen Stadium; Greenville, NC	ESPN	L 7–14	25,509	
December 29	3:30 pm	vs. Utah State*	Bronco Stadium; Boise, ID (Humanitarian Bowl)	ESPN2	W 35–19	16,289	
*Non-conference game; Rankings from AP Poll released prior to the game; All times are in Eastern time

== Roster ==
1997 Cincinnati Bearcats football team roster
Players
Coaches
Offense

Pos.	#	Name	Class
OT	67	Jason Fabini	Sr
QB	4	Chad Plummer	Jr

Defense

Pos.	#	Name	Class
CB	21	Artrell Hawkins	Sr
OLB	3	Brad Jackson	Sr
DT	95	Derrick Ransom	Sr

Special teams

Pos.	#	Name	Class

Head coach

- Rick Minter

Coordinators/assistant coaches

- Kim Dameron (Defensive backs)

Legend

- (C) Team captain
- (S) Suspended
- (I) Ineligible
- Injured
- Redshirt
