= 1997 Penn State Nittany Lions football team =

American college football season

1997 Penn State Nittany Lions football

Lambert-Meadowlands Trophy

Florida Citrus Bowl, L 6–21 vs. Florida
- Conference: Big Ten Conference

Ranking
- Coaches: No. 17
- AP: No. 16
- Record: 9–3 (6–2 Big Ten)
- Head coach: Joe Paterno (32nd season)
- Offensive coordinator: Fran Ganter (14th season)
- Offensive scheme: Pro-style
- Defensive coordinator: Jerry Sandusky (21st season)
- Base defense: 4–3
- Captains: Aaron Collins; Matt Fornadel; Mike McQueary; Phil Ostrowski
- Home stadium: Beaver Stadium

1997 Big Ten Conference football standings
	Conf.			Overall
Team	W		L	W		L
No. 1 Michigan $	8	–	0	12	–	0
No. 12 Ohio State	6	–	2	10	–	3
No. 16 Penn State	6	–	2	9	–	3
No. 15 Purdue	6	–	2	9	–	3
Wisconsin	5	–	3	8	–	5
Iowa	4	–	4	7	–	5
Michigan State	4	–	4	7	–	5
Northwestern	3	–	5	5	–	7
Minnesota	1	–	7	3	–	9
Indiana	1	–	7	2	–	9
Illinois	0	–	8	0	–	11
$ – Conference champion; Rankings from AP Poll

The 1997 Penn State Nittany Lions football team represented the Pennsylvania State University as a member of the Big Ten Conference during the 1997 NCAA Division I-A football season. Led by 32nd-year head coach Joe Paterno, the Nittany Lions compiled an overall record of 9–3 with a mark of 6–2 in conference play, placing in a three-way tie for second in the Big Ten. Penn State was invited to the Florida Citrus Bowl, where the Nittany Lions lost to Florida. The team played home games at Beaver Stadium in University Park, Pennsylvania.

== Schedule ==
Date	Time	Opponent	Rank	Site	TV	Result	Attendance	Source
September 6	3:30 p.m.	Pittsburgh*	No. 1	Beaver Stadium; University Park, PA (rivalry)	ABC	W 34–17	97,115	
September 13	1:00 p.m.	Temple*	No. 1	Beaver Stadium; University Park, PA		W 52–10	96,735	
September 20	12:00 p.m.	at Louisville*	No. 1	Cardinal Stadium; Louisville, KY	CBS	W 57–21	39,826	
October 4	12:30 p.m.	at Illinois	No. 2	Memorial Stadium; Champaign, IL	ESPN2	W 41–6	51,523	
October 11	3:30 p.m.	No. 7 Ohio State	No. 2	Beaver Stadium; University Park, PA (rivalry)	ABC	W 31–27	97,282	
October 18	12:00 p.m.	Minnesota^{†}	No. 1	Beaver Stadium; University Park, PA (Governor's Victory Bell)	ESPN Plus	W 16–15	96,953	
November 1	12:30 p.m.	at Northwestern	No. 2	Ryan Field; Evanston, IL	ESPN	W 30–27	47,129	
November 8	3:30 p.m.	No. 4 Michigan	No. 2	Beaver Stadium; University Park, PA (rivalry)	ABC	L 8–34	97,498	
November 15	12:00 p.m.	at No. 19 Purdue	No. 6	Ross–Ade Stadium; West Lafayette, IN	ESPN	W 42–17	52,156	
November 22	3:30 p.m.	No. 24 Wisconsin	No. 6	Beaver Stadium; University Park, PA	ABC	W 35–10	96,934	
November 29	1:00 p.m.	at Michigan State	No. 4	Spartan Stadium; East Lansing, MI (rivalry)	ABC	L 14–49	73,623	
January 1, 1998	1:00 p.m.	vs. No. 6 Florida*	No. 11	Florida Citrus Bowl; Orlando, FL (Florida Citrus Bowl)	ABC	L 6–21	72,940	
*Non-conference game; ^{†}Homecoming; Rankings from AP Poll released prior to the game; All times are in Eastern time

== Rankings ==
Ranking movements Legend: ██ Increase in ranking ██ Decrease in ranking ( ) = First-place votes
	Week																	
Poll	Pre	1	2	3	4	5	6	7	8	9	10	11	12	13	14	15	16	Final
AP	1 (21)	1 (22)	1 (23)	1 (22)	1 (25)	2 (28)	2 (25)	2 (26)	1 (51)	2 (26)	2 (25)	2 (16)	6	6	4	12	11	16
Coaches	2 (9)		2 (13)	2 (12)	2 (14)	2 (14)	2 (13)	2 (11)	1 (51)	2 (29)	2 (20)	3 (8)	6	6	4	12	12	17

== Roster ==
1997 Penn State Nittany Lions football team roster
Players
Coaches
Offense

Pos.	#	Name	Class
RB	39	Curtis Enis	Jr
WR	2	Chafie Fields	So
WR	83	Joe Jurevicius	Sr
QB	9	Mike McQueary	Sr
G	64	Phil Ostrowski	Sr
QB	16	Kevin Thompson	So
G	69	Floyd Wedderburn	Jr

Defense

Pos.	#	Name	Class
LB	11	LaVar Arrington	Fr
DE	86	Courtney Brown	So
CB	17	Brad Johnson	Jr
SS	4	Derek Fox	So
LB	44	Jim Nelson	Sr
CB	27	David Macklin	So
DE	5	Brad Scioli	Jr
LB	43	Brandon Short	So

Special teams

Pos.	#	Name	Class
P	41	Pat Pidgeon	So

Head coach

- Joe Paterno

Coordinators/assistant coaches

Legend

- (C) Team captain
- (S) Suspended
- (I) Ineligible
- Injured
- Redshirt

Roster

== NFL draft ==
Three Nittany Lions were drafted in the 1998 NFL draft.

Round	Pick	Overall	Name	Position	Team
1st	5	5	Curtis Enis	Running back	Chicago Bears
2nd	25	55	Joe Jurevicius	Wide receiver	New York Giants
5th	28	151	Phil Ostrowski	Offensive guard	San Francisco 49ers
