= Tim Dwight =

American football player (born 1975)

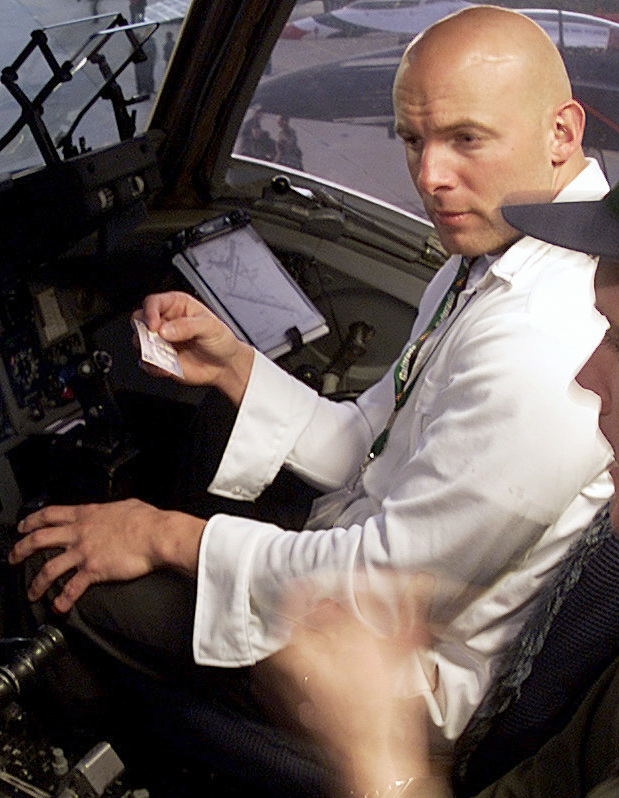
- Dwight in a Boeing C-17 Globemaster III at MacDill Air Force Base in 2001

No. 17, 83, 85, 86, 87
- Position: Wide receiver

Personal information
- Born: July 13, 1975 (age 51); Iowa City, Iowa, U.S.
- Listed height: 5 ft 8 in (1.73 m)
- Listed weight: 180 lb (82 kg)

Career information
- High school: Iowa City
- College: Iowa
- NFL draft: 1998: 4th round, 114th overall pick

Career history
- Atlanta Falcons (1998–2000); San Diego Chargers (2001–2004); New England Patriots (2005); New York Jets (2006); Oakland Raiders (2007)

Awards and highlights
- PFWA All-Rookie Team (1998); Consensus All-American (1997); First-team All-American (1996); First-team All-Big Ten (1997); Second-team All-Big Ten (1996)

Career NFL statistics
- Receptions: 194
- Receiving yards: 2,964
- Rushing attempts: 53
- Rushing yards: 380
- Return yards: 6,526
- Total touchdowns: 27
- Stats at Pro Football Reference

Timothy John Dwight Jr. (born July 13, 1975) is an American former professional football player who was a wide receiver and return specialist for 10 seasons in the National Football League (NFL). He played college football for the Iowa Hawkeyes, and was a two-time All-American. He was selected by the Atlanta Falcons in the fourth round of the 1998 NFL draft, and he played professionally for the Falcons, San Diego Chargers, New England Patriots, New York Jets and Oakland Raiders of the NFL.

Dwight is remembered for his 94-yard touchdown return on a kickoff in Super Bowl XXXIII against the Denver Broncos.

== College career ==
Dwight attended the University of Iowa, where he played for the Iowa Hawkeyes football team. He finished his college career with Big Ten Conference records for punt return yardage (1,102) and punts returned for touchdowns (5); his yardage mark has since been eclipsed by three others and Ted Ginn Jr. surpassed his return touchdown mark. Dwight held the Hawkeyes team record for career receiving touchdowns (21) until 2011, when his mark was surpassed by Marvin McNutt. He held the team record for career receiving yards (2,271) until 2010 when Derrell Johnson-Koulianos became the all-time leader in receiving yards. In 1997, Dwight was a consensus first-team All-American and finished seventh in the balloting for the Heisman Trophy.

On December 12, 2014, the Big Ten Network included Dwight on "The Mount Rushmore of Iowa Football", as chosen by online fan voting. Dwight was joined in the honor by Nile Kinnick, Chuck Long and Alex Karras.

On November 24, 2015, an annual award from the Big Ten Conference was created in honor of Dwight and Johnny Rodgers called the Rodgers-Dwight Return Specialist of the Year.

=== Track and field ===
Dwight also competed in track events, with personal bests of 10.31 seconds in the 100 meters and 20.98 seconds in the 200 meters; in 1999, he was Big Ten Champion in the 100-meter dash, and he also was a member of the Big Ten champion 4×400-meter relay and 4×100-meter relay teams in 1999, and the Big Ten champion 4×100-meter relay team in 1998.

==== Personal bests ====
Event	Time (seconds)	Venue	Date
60 meters	6.87	Cedar Falls, Iowa	February 27, 2000
100 meters	10.31	West Lafayette, Indiana	May 22, 1999
200 meters	20.98	West Lafayette, Indiana	May 22, 1999

== Professional career ==
=== Atlanta Falcons ===
Dwight was drafted in the fourth round (114th overall) of the 1998 NFL draft by the Atlanta Falcons. In Super Bowl XXXIII, he returned five kickoffs, including one for 94 yards and a touchdown. He is second all-time in Super Bowl kick return yardage for a single game (210), and his 42.0 yards per return in the game was a Super Bowl career record. Dwight is also known as "The Man".

=== San Diego Chargers ===
After three seasons with Atlanta, Dwight was traded on April 20, 2001, to the San Diego Chargers as part of the deal that enabled the Falcons to select quarterback Michael Vick with the 2001 draft's top selection (which the Chargers originally held pursuant to their 1–15 record in 2000).

=== New England Patriots ===
Dwight became a free agent following the 2004 season, and on March 11, 2005, he signed with the New England Patriots. As a New England Patriot, Dwight caught 19 passes for 332 yards and 3 touchdowns and also gained 523 yards returning punts and kickoffs.

=== New York Jets ===
After the 2005 NFL season, Dwight signed a four-year contract to play for the New York Jets, and was expected to play as the fourth wide receiver and perform return duties.

For the 2006 season, Dwight played in nine games totaling 16 receptions for 112 yards, before being placed on IR in early December. He also had 146 punt return yards.

=== Oakland Raiders ===
Dwight signed a one-year contract with the Oakland Raiders in October 2007. He returned one kickoff, and totaled 98 yards and two touchdowns as a receiver. He became a free agent after that season but did not play in the NFL in 2008.

=== Accomplishments and reputation ===
Despite being only 5'8" tall and weighing 185 pounds, Dwight was a prolific punt and kick returner during his career. He was labeled "injury-prone" because he rarely played a season without missing a significant number of games. The 2005 season was the only season in which Dwight appeared in all 16 of his team's games. Dwight's most productive seasons as a wide receiver have been 1999, when he caught 32 passes for 669 yards (a 20.9-yard average per catch) with seven touchdowns, and 2002, when he caught 50 passes for 623 yards. He also scored five return touchdowns in the NFL, three on punts and two on kickoffs.

Dwight has a number of interests outside football. He founded the Tim Dwight Foundation to help needy kids with scholarships and provide assistance to the Children's Hospital of Iowa. He also owns his own yoga studio in Iowa.

In 2007, The Cedar Rapids (Iowa) Gazette sports staff voted Dwight the all-time greatest athlete from that newspaper's circulation area, topping other notables like NFL quarterback Kurt Warner and 2007 Masters champion Zach Johnson.

== NFL career statistics ==
Year	Team	Games		Receiving					Rushing					Punt returns					Kickoff returns				
Year	Team	GP	GS	Rec	Yds	Avg	Lng	TD	Att	Yds	Avg	Lng	TD	Ret	Yds	Avg	Lng	TD	Ret	Yds	Avg	Lng	TD
1998	ATL	12	0	4	94	23.5	44	1	8	19	2.4	7	0	31	263	8.5	23	0	36	973	27.0	93	1
1999	ATL	12	8	32	669	20.9	60	7	5	28	5.6	9	1	20	220	11.0	70	1	44	944	21.5	40	0
2000	ATL	14	1	26	406	15.6	52	3	5	8	1.6	5	0	33	309	9.4	70	1	32	680	21.3	48	0
2001	SD	10	2	25	406	16.2	78	0	2	24	12.0	16	1	24	271	11.3	84	1	—	—	—	—	0
2002	SD	16	14	50	623	12.5	42	2	12	108	9.0	20	1	19	231	12.2	37	0	8	166	20.8	26	0
2003	SD	9	3	14	193	13.8	32	0	9	88	9.8	20	0	2	0	0.0	2	0	22	488	22.2	32	0
2004	SD	12	0	2	31	15.5	23	1	4	54	13.5	48	0	1	6	6.0	6	0	50	1,222	24.4	87	1
2005	NE	16	1	19	332	17.5	59	3	4	11	2.8	12	0	32	273	8.5	29	0	10	250	25.0	38	0
2006	NYJ	9	2	16	112	7.0	15	0	2	28	14.0	28	0	14	146	10.4	18	0	—	—	—	—	0
2007	OAK	6	1	6	98	16.3	28	2	2	12	6.0	10	0	9	54	6.0	16	0	1	30	30.0	30	0
Career		116	32	194	2,964	15.3	78	19	53	380	7.2	48	3	185	1,773	9.6	84	3	203	4,753	23.4	93	2
