= 1998 NFL draft =

National Football League draft

General information
- Date: April 18–19, 1998
- Location: The Theater at Madison Square Garden in New York City, New York
- Network: ESPN

Overview
- 241 total selections in 7 rounds
- League: NFL
- First selection: Peyton Manning, QB; Indianapolis Colts
- Mr. Irrelevant: Cam Quayle, TE; Baltimore Ravens
- Most selections (12): New York Jets
- Fewest selections (5): Detroit Lions
- Hall of Famers: 4: QB Peyton Manning; CB Charles Woodson; WR Randy Moss; G Alan Faneca

The 1998 NFL draft was the procedure by which National Football League teams selected amateur college football players. It is officially known as the NFL Annual Player Selection Meeting. The draft was held April 18–19, 1998, at the Theater at Madison Square Garden in New York City, New York. The league also held a supplemental draft after the regular draft and before the regular season.

Before the draft, there was much debate in the media on if the Indianapolis Colts would select quarterbacks Peyton Manning from the University of Tennessee's Volunteers or Ryan Leaf from the Washington State University's Cougars with the first overall pick. Both were considered excellent prospects and future franchise quarterbacks: Leaf was considered to have more upside and a stronger throwing arm, whereas Manning was considered a polished prospect who was NFL ready and more mature.

On the day of the draft, the Colts selected Manning due to Leaf's disdain for Indianapolis and many other factors, with Leaf being selected second overall by the San Diego Chargers, who traded a king's ransom to the Arizona Cardinals for the right to draft whoever the Colts didn't select with the first overall selection to replace the recently-retired Stan Humphries as their franchise quarterback, which became Leaf, while the Cardinals would take the Chargers' original third overall pick to select the Florida State Seminoles defensive end Andre Wadsworth.

Manning went on to be a five-time Most Valuable Player (MVP) award winner (the most of any player in NFL history), a two-time Super Bowl champion (in 2006 with the Colts and in 2015 with the Denver Broncos), and was inducted into the Pro Football Hall of Fame in 2021, while Leaf was out of the NFL by 2002 after having earned a 4–17 record over 21 games as a starting quarterback with both the Chargers and the Dallas Cowboys, with brief stints with the Tampa Bay Buccaneers and the Seattle Seahawks, and is considered one of the biggest draft busts in NFL history.

== Player selections ==
*	Compensatory selection
†	Pro Bowler (Note: Players are identified as a Pro Bowler if they were selected for the Pro Bowl at any time in their career.)
‡	Hall of Famer

Positions key
Offense	Defense	Special teams
QB — Quarterback; RB — Running back; FB — Fullback; WR — Wide receiver; TE — Tight end; OL — Offensive lineman; T — Tackle; G — Guard; C — Center	DL — Defensive lineman; DT — Defensive tackle (Note: Includes nose tackle (NT)); DE — Defensive end; EDGE — Edge rusher; LB — Linebacker (Note: Includes middle linebacker (MLB/MIKE), weakside linebacker (WILL), strongside linebacker (SAM), off-ball linebacker, and outside linebacker (OLB)); DB — Defensive back; CB — Cornerback; S — Safety (Note: Includes free safety (FS) and strong safety (SS))	K — Kicker (Note: Also known as a placekicker (PK)); P — Punter; LS — Long snapper; RS — Return specialist (Note: Includes kickoff and punt returners)

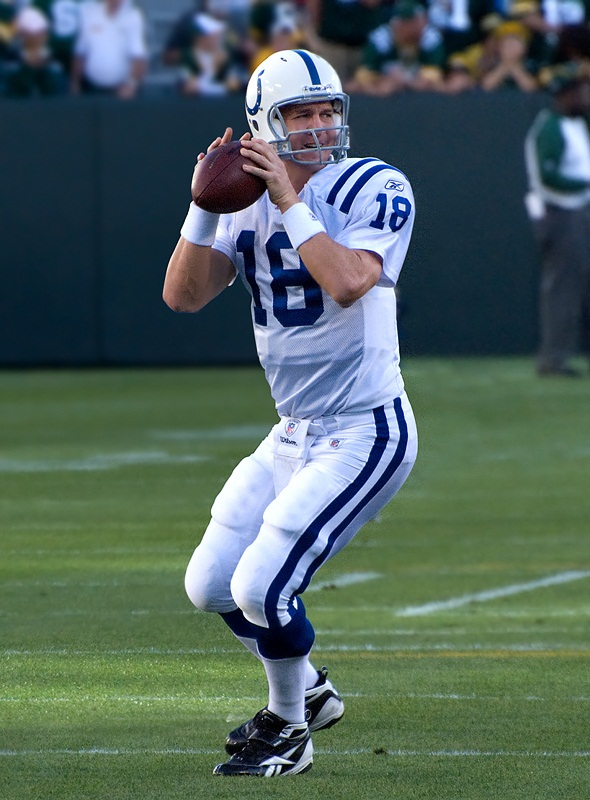
Peyton Manning, taken first overall, won two Super Bowls and is considered one of the greatest quarterbacks of all time.

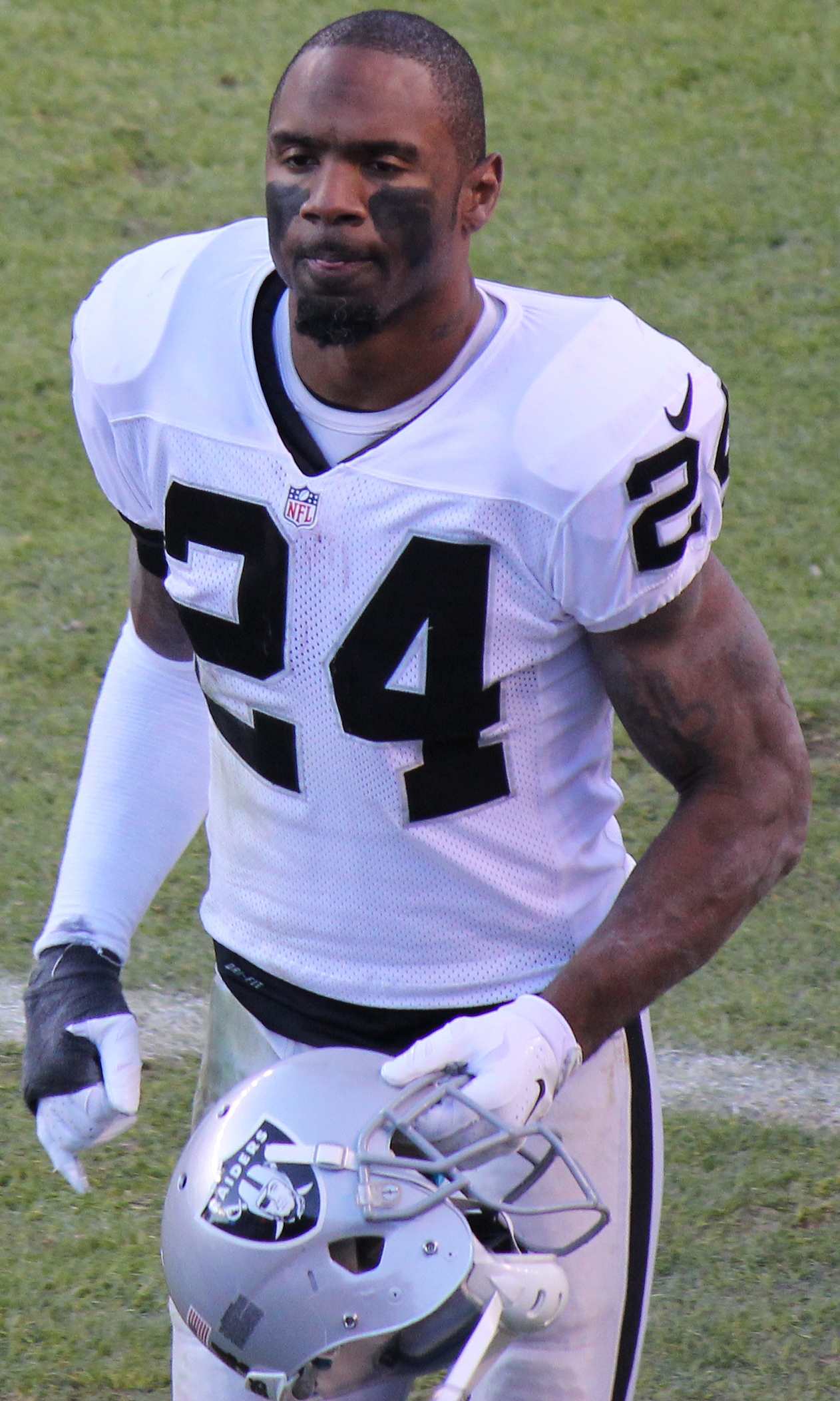
Charles Woodson was a nine-time Pro Bowl selection, four-time All-Pro, voted to the NFL 2000s All-Decade Team and inducted into the Pro Football Hall of Fame in 2021

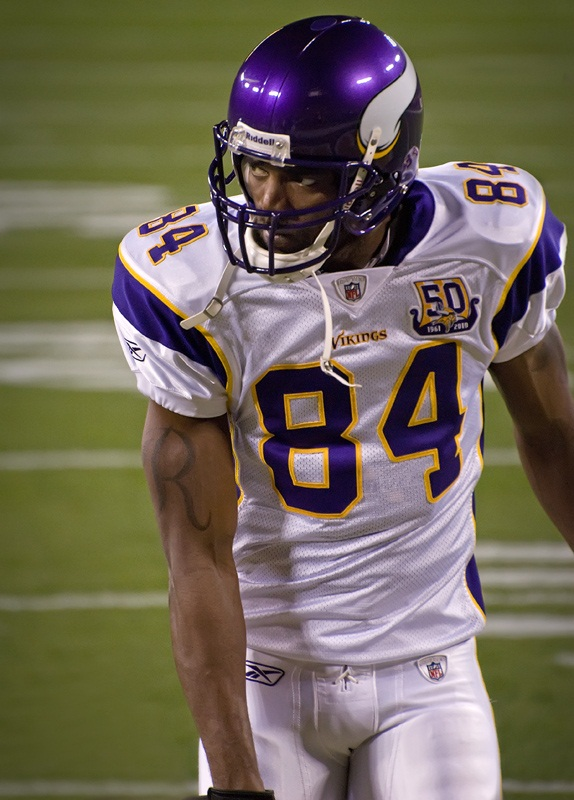
Randy Moss is considered one of the greatest wide receivers of all time and was inducted into the Pro Football Hall of Fame in 2018

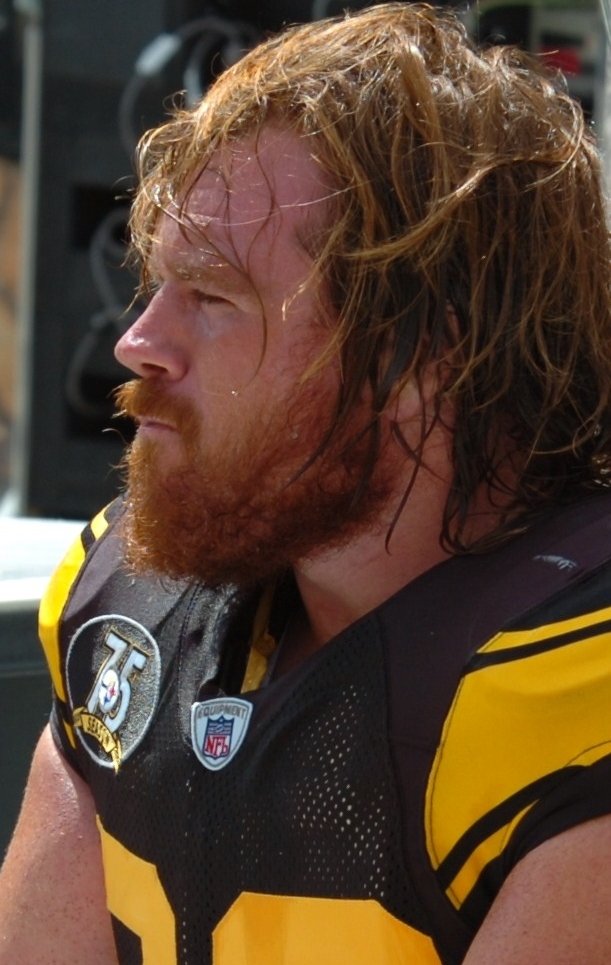
Considered one of the best guards ever, Alan Faneca was a nine-time Pro Bowl selection, a six-time All-Pro, voted to the NFL 2000s All-Decade Team and inducted into the Pro Football Hall of Fame in 2021

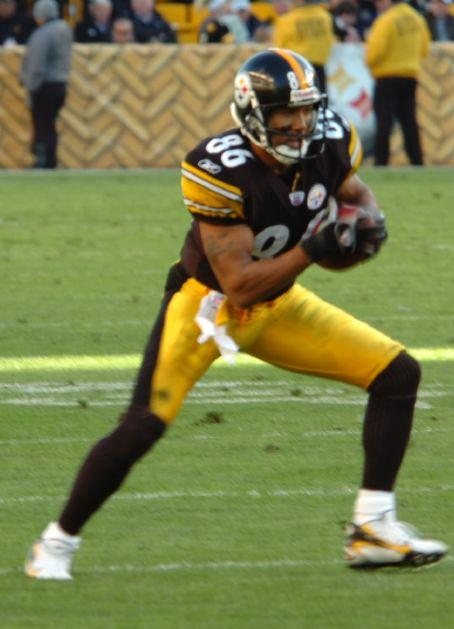
Receiver Hines Ward won two Super Bowls with Pittsburgh, winning the Super Bowl XL MVP award

Rnd.	Pick	Team	Player	Pos.	College	Notes
1	1	Indianapolis Colts	Peyton Manning^{‡}^{†}	QB	Tennessee	1997 Maxwell Award winner
1	2	San Diego Chargers	Ryan Leaf	QB	Washington State	from Arizona (Note: No. 2: Arizona → San Diego (PD). Arizona traded a first-round selection (2nd overall) to San Diego in exchange for first- and second-round selections (3rd and 33rd overall), a 1999 first-round selection, RB Eric Metcalf and LB Patrick Sapp.)
1	3	Arizona Cardinals	Andre Wadsworth	DE	Florida State	from San Diego (Note: No. 3: San Diego → Arizona (PD). See Round 1: Arizona → San Diego.)
1	4	Oakland Raiders	Charles Woodson^{‡}^{†}	CB	Michigan	1997 Heisman Trophy winner
1	5	Chicago Bears	Curtis Enis	RB	Penn State	
1	6	St. Louis Rams	Grant Wistrom	DE	Nebraska	
1	7	New Orleans Saints	Kyle Turley ^{†}	T	San Diego State	
1	8	Dallas Cowboys	Greg Ellis ^{†}	DE	North Carolina	
1	9	Jacksonville Jaguars	Fred Taylor ^{†}	RB	Florida	from Buffalo (Note: No. 9: Buffalo → Jacksonville (PD). Buffalo traded first- and fourth-round selections (9th and 101st overall) to Jacksonville in exchange for QB Rob Johnson.)
1	10	Baltimore Ravens	Duane Starks	CB	Miami (FL)	
1	11	Philadelphia Eagles	Tra Thomas ^{†}	T	Florida State	
1	12	Atlanta Falcons	Keith Brooking ^{†}	LB	Georgia Tech	
1	13	Cincinnati Bengals	Takeo Spikes ^{†}	LB	Auburn	
1	14	Carolina Panthers	Jason Peter	DT	Nebraska	
1	15	Seattle Seahawks	Anthony Simmons	LB	Clemson	
1	16	Tennessee Oilers	Kevin Dyson	WR	Utah	
1	17	Cincinnati Bengals	Brian Simmons	LB	North Carolina	from Washington (Note: No. 17: Washington → Cincinnati (PD). Washington sent first- and third-round selections (17th and 78th overall) to Cincinnati as compensation for signing restricted free agent DT Dan Wilkinson.)
1	18	New England Patriots	Robert Edwards	RB	Georgia	from NY Jets (Note: No. 18: NY Jets → New England (PD). The NY Jets sent first- and third-round selections (18th and 81st overall) to New England as compensation for signing restricted free agent RB Curtis Martin.)
1	19	Green Bay Packers	Vonnie Holliday	DE	North Carolina	from Miami (Note: No. 19: Miami → Green Bay (D). Miami traded a first-round selection (19th overall) to Green Bay in exchange for first- and second-round selections (29th and 60th overall).)
1	20	Detroit Lions	Terry Fair	CB	Tennessee	
1	21	Minnesota Vikings	Randy Moss^{‡}^{†}	WR	Marshall	
1	22	New England Patriots	Tebucky Jones	S	Syracuse	
1	23	Oakland Raiders	Mo Collins	T	Florida	from Tampa Bay (Note: No. 23: Tampa Bay → Oakland (D). Tampa Bay traded a first-round selection (23rd overall) to Oakland in exchange for two second-round selections (34th and 59th overall).)
1	24	New York Giants	Shaun Williams	S	UCLA	
1	25	Jacksonville Jaguars	Donovin Darius	S	Syracuse	
1	26	Pittsburgh Steelers	Alan Faneca^{‡}^{†}	G	LSU	
1	27	Kansas City Chiefs	Victor Riley	T	Auburn	
1	28	San Francisco 49ers	R. W. McQuarters	CB	Oklahoma State	
1	29	Miami Dolphins	John Avery	RB	Mississippi	from Green Bay (Note: No. 29: Green Bay → Miami (D). See Round 1: Miami → Green Bay.)
1	30	Denver Broncos	Marcus Nash	WR	Tennessee	
2*	31	Oakland Raiders	Leon Bender	DT	Washington State	
2	32	Indianapolis Colts	Jerome Pathon	WR	Washington	
2	33	Arizona Cardinals	Corey Chavous ^{†}	S	Vanderbilt	from San Diego (Note: No. 33: San Diego → Arizona (PD). See Round 1: Arizona → San Diego.)
2	34	Tampa Bay Buccaneers	Jacquez Green	WR	Florida	from Oakland (Note: No. 34: Oakland → Tampa Bay (D). See Round 1: Tampa Bay → Oakland.)
2	35	Chicago Bears	Tony Parrish	S	Washington	
2	36	Arizona Cardinals	Anthony Clement	T	SW Louisiana	
2	37	St. Louis Rams	Robert Holcombe	FB	Illinois	
2	38	Dallas Cowboys	Flozell Adams ^{†}	T	Michigan State	
2	39	Buffalo Bills	Sam Cowart ^{†}	LB	Florida State	
2	40	New Orleans Saints	Cameron Cleeland	TE	Washington	
2	41	Pittsburgh Steelers	Jeremy Staat	DE	Arizona State	from Philadelphia via NY Jets (Note: No. 41: Philadelphia → NY Jets → Pittsburgh. Multiple trades: Philadelphia → NY Jets (PD). Philadelphia traded second- and fifth-round selections (41st and 134th overall) to the NY Jets in exchange for DE Hugh Douglas. NY Jets → Pittsburgh (D). The NY Jets traded a second-round selection (41st overall) to Pittsburgh in exchange for second-, third- and fifth-round selections (56th, 87th and 149th overall).)
2	42	Baltimore Ravens	Pat Johnson	WR	Oregon	
2	43	Cincinnati Bengals	Artrell Hawkins	S	Cincinnati	
2	44	Miami Dolphins	Patrick Surtain ^{†}	CB	Southern Mississippi	from Carolina (Note: No. 44: Carolina → Miami (D). Carolina traded a second-round selection (44th overall) to Miami in exchange for a 2000 first-round selection.)
2	45	Tampa Bay Buccaneers	Brian Kelly	CB	USC	from Atlanta (Note: No. 45: Atlanta → Tampa Bay (D). Atlanta traded a second-round selection (45th overall) to Tampa Bay in exchange for second- and fourth-round selections (53rd and 114th overall).)
2	46	Tennessee Oilers	Samari Rolle ^{†}	CB	Florida State	
2	47	Seattle Seahawks	Todd Weiner	T	Kansas State	
2	48	Washington Redskins	Stephen Alexander ^{†}	TE	Oklahoma	
2	49	Miami Dolphins	Kenny Mixon	DE	LSU	
2	50	Detroit Lions	Germane Crowell	WR	Virginia	
2	51	Minnesota Vikings	Kailee Wong	LB	Stanford	
2	52	New England Patriots	Tony Simmons	WR	Wisconsin	from NY Jets (Note: No. 52: NY Jets → New England (PD). The NY Jets sent a second-round selection (56th overall), 1997 second- and third-round selections and a 1999 first-round selection to New England as compensation hiring Bill Parcells as head coach.)
2	53	Atlanta Falcons	Bob Hallen	C	Kent State	from Tampa Bay (Note: No. 53: Tampa Bay → Atlanta (D). See Round 2: Atlanta → Tampa Bay.)
2	54	New England Patriots	Rod Rutledge	TE	Alabama	
2	55	New York Giants	Joe Jurevicius	WR	Penn State	
2	56	New York Jets	Dorian Boose	DE	Washington State	from Pittsburgh (Note: No. 56: Pittsburgh → NY Jets (PD). See Round 2: NY Jets → Pittsburgh.)
2	57	Jacksonville Jaguars	Cordell Taylor	CB	Hampton	
2	58	San Francisco 49ers	Jeremy Newberry ^{†}	C	California	
2	59	San Diego Chargers	Mikhael Ricks	TE	Stephen F. Austin	from Kansas City via Oakland and Tampa Bay (Note: No. 59: Kansas City → Oakland → Tampa Bay → San Diego. Multiple trades: Kansas City → Oakland (PD). Kansas City sent a second-round selection to Oakland as compensation for signing restricted free agent DT Chester McGlockton. Oakland → Tampa Bay (D). See Round 1: Tampa Bay → Oakland. Tampa Bay → San Diego (D). Tampa Bay traded a second-round selection (59th overall) to San Diego in exchange for a 2000 first-round selection.)
2	60	Detroit Lions	Charlie Batch	QB	Eastern Michigan	from Green Bay via Miami (Note: No. 60: Green Bay → Miami → Detroit. Multiple trades: Green Bay → Miami (D). See Round 1: Miami → Green Bay. Miami → Detroit (D). Miami traded a second-round selection (60th overall) to Detroit in exchange for third-, fifth- and sixth-round selections (79th, 143rd and 172nd).)
2	61	Denver Broncos	Eric Brown	S	Mississippi State	
3	62	Carolina Panthers	Chuck Wiley	DE	LSU	from Indianapolis (Note: No. 62: Indianapolis → Carolina (PD). Indianapolis sent a third-round selection (62nd overall) to Carolina as compensation for hiring Bill Polian as general manager.)
3	63	Oakland Raiders	Jon Ritchie	FB	Stanford	
3	64	Chicago Bears	Olin Kreutz ^{†}	C	Washington	
3	65	St. Louis Rams	Leonard Little ^{†}	DE	Tennessee	from Arizona via NY Jets (Note: No. 65: Arizona → NY Jets → St. Louis. Multiple trades: Arizona → NY Jets (PD). Arizona traded a third-round selection (65th overall) to the NY Jets in exchange for RB Adrian Murrell. NY Jets → St. Louis (D). The NY Jets traded a third-round selection (65th overall) to St. Louis in exchange for third- and seventh-round selections (67th and 195th overall).)
3	66	Pittsburgh Steelers	Chris Conrad	T	Fresno State	from San Diego (Note: No. 66: San Diego → Pittsburgh (PD). San Diego traded a third-round selection (66th overall) to Pittsburgh in exchange for a 1997 fifth-round selection.)
3	67	New York Jets	Scott Frost	S	Nebraska	from St. Louis (Note: No. 67: St. Louis → NY Jets (D). See Round 3: NY Jets → St. Louis.)
3	68	Buffalo Bills	Robert Hicks	T	Mississippi State	
3	69	Washington Redskins	Skip Hicks	RB	UCLA	from New Orleans (Note: No. 69: New Orleans → Washington (PD). New Orleans traded a third-round selection (69th overall) and a 1997 fifth-round selection to Washington in exchange for QB Heath Shuler.)
3	70	New York Giants	Brian Alford	WR	Purdue	from Dallas via Philadelphia (Note: No. 70: Dallas → Philadelphia → NY Giants. Multiple trades: Dallas → Philadelphia (D). Dallas traded a third-round selection (70th overall) and 1997 first- and fifth-round selections to Philadelphia in exchange for a 1997 first-round selection. Philadelphia → NY Giants (D). Philadelphia traded a third-round selection (70th overall) to the NY Giants in exchange for third- and fourth-round selections (85th and 116th overall).)
3	71	Indianapolis Colts	E. G. Green	WR	Florida State	from Baltimore (Note: No. 71: Baltimore → Indianapolis (PD). Baltimore traded third- and fourth-round selections (71st and 103rd overall) to Indianapolis in exchange for a fourth-round selection (93rd overall) and QB Jim Harbaugh.)
3	72	Philadelphia Eagles	Jeremiah Trotter ^{†}	LB	Stephen F. Austin	
3	73	Carolina Panthers	Mitch Marrow	DE	Penn	
3	74	Atlanta Falcons	Jammi German	WR	Miami (FL)	
3	75	Cincinnati Bengals	Steve Foley	LB	Northeast Louisiana	
3	76	Seattle Seahawks	Ahman Green ^{†}	RB	Nebraska	
3	77	Tennessee Oilers	Dainon Sidney	CB	UAB	
3	78	Cincinnati Bengals	Mike Goff	T	Iowa	from Washington (Note: No. 78: Washington → Cincinnati (PD). See Round 1: Washington → Cincinnati.)
3	79	Miami Dolphins	Brad Jackson	LB	Cincinnati	from Detroit (Note: No. 79: Detroit → Miami (D). See Round 2: Miami → Detroit.)
3	80	Minnesota Vikings	Ramos McDonald	CB	New Mexico	
3	81	New England Patriots	Chris Floyd	FB	Michigan	from NY Jets (Note: No. 81: NY Jets → New England (PD). See Round 1: NY Jets → New England.)
3	82	Miami Dolphins	Larry Shannon	WR	East Carolina	
3	83	New England Patriots	Greg Spires	DE	Florida State	
3	84	Tampa Bay Buccaneers	Jamie Duncan	LB	Vanderbilt	
3	85	Philadelphia Eagles	Allen Rossum ^{†}	CB	Notre Dame	from NY Giants (Note: No. 85: NY Giants → Philadelphia (D). See Round 3: Philadelphia → NY Giants.)
3	86	Jacksonville Jaguars	Jonathan Quinn	QB	Middle Tennessee	
3	87	New York Jets	Kevin Williams	S	Oklahoma State	from Pittsburgh (Note: No. 87: Pittsburgh → NY Jets (D). See Round 2: NY Jets → Pittsburgh.)
3	88	Kansas City Chiefs	Rashaan Shehee	RB	Washington	
3	89	San Francisco 49ers	Chris Ruhman	T	Texas A&M	
3	90	Green Bay Packers	Jonathan Brown	DT	Tennessee	
3	91	Denver Broncos	Brian Griese ^{†}	QB	Michigan	
3*	92	Pittsburgh Steelers	Hines Ward ^{†}	WR	Georgia	
4	93	Indianapolis Colts	Steve McKinney	C	Texas A&M	from Indianapolis via Baltimore (Note: No. 93: Indianapolis → Baltimore → Indianapolis. Multiple trades: Indianapolis → Baltimore (D). See Round 3: Baltimore → Indianapolis. Baltimore → Indianapolis (D). Baltimore traded a fourth-round selection (93rd overall) to Indianapolis in exchange for fourth-, fifth- and sixth-round selections (103rd, 124th and 154th overall).)
4	94	Chicago Bears	Alonzo Mayes	TE	Oklahoma State	
4	95	Arizona Cardinals	Michael Pittman	RB	Fresno State	
4	96	St. Louis Rams	Az-Zahir Hakim	WR	San Diego State	from San Diego (Note: No. 96: San Diego → St. Louis (PD). San Diego traded a fourth-round selection (96th overall) and a 1997 seventh-round selection to St. Louis in exchange for a 1997 fifth-round selection.)
4	97	New Orleans Saints	Fred Weary	CB	Florida	from Oakland (Note: No. 97: Oakland → New Orleans (PD). Oakland traded a fourth-round selection (97th overall) to New Orleans in exchange for CB Eric Allen.)
4	98	St. Louis Rams	Roland Williams	TE	Syracuse	
4	99	New Orleans Saints	Julian Pittman	DT	Florida State	
4	100	Dallas Cowboys	Michael Myers	DT	Alabama	
4	101	Jacksonville Jaguars	Tavian Banks	RB	Iowa	from Buffalo (Note: No. 101: Buffalo → Jacksonville (PD). See Round 1: Buffalo → Jacksonville.)
4	102	Miami Dolphins	Lorenzo Bromell	DE	Clemson	from Philadelphia (Note: No. 102: Philadelphia → Miami (D). Philadelphia traded a fourth-round selection (102nd overall) to Miami in exchange for fourth- and fifth-round selections (112th and 142nd overall).)
4	103	Atlanta Falcons	Omar Brown	S	North Carolina	from Baltimore via Indianapolis, Baltimore and Tampa Bay; (Note: No. 103: Baltimore → Indianapolis → Baltimore → Tampa Bay. Multiple trades: Baltimore → Indianapolis (D). See Round 3: Baltimore → Indianapolis. Indianapolis → Baltimore (D). See Round 4: Baltimore → Indianapolis. Baltimore → Tampa Bay (D). Baltimore traded a fourth-round selection (103rd overall) to Tampa Bay in exchange for a 1999 third-round selection.) in place of Tampa Bay (time expired) (Note: No. 103: Tampa Bay held the 103rd pick, but did not make their selection in the allotted time. By rule, they could make a selection at any time afterwards, but Atlanta were able to make their own picks before Tampa Bay could make their own.)
4	104	Tampa Bay Buccaneers	Todd Washington	C	Virginia Tech	instead of No. 103 (time expired) (Note: No. 104: See No. 103.)
4	105	Cincinnati Bengals	Glen Steele	DT	Michigan	
4	106	Carolina Panthers	Donald Hayes	WR	Wisconsin	
4	107	Tennessee Oilers	Joe Salave'a	DT	Arizona	
4	108	Seattle Seahawks	DeShone Myles	LB	Nevada	
4	109	Oakland Raiders	Gennaro DiNapoli	G	Virginia Tech	from Washington (Note: No. 109: Washington → Oakland (D). Washington traded a fourth-round selection (109th overall) to Oakland in exchange for fourth- and seventh-round selections (113th and 191st overall).)
4	110	Minnesota Vikings	Kivuusama Mays	LB	North Carolina	
4	111	New York Jets	Jason Fabini	T	Cincinnati	
4	112	Philadelphia Eagles	Brandon Whiting	DT	California	from Miami (Note: No. 112: Miami → Philadelphia (D). See Round 4: Philadelphia → Miami.)
4	113	Washington Redskins	Shawn Barber	LB	Richmond	from Detroit via Oakland (Note: No. 113: Detroit → Oakland → Washington. Multiple trades: Detroit → Oakland (PD). Detroit traded a fourth-round selection (113th overall) to Oakland in exchange for LB Rob Fredrickson. Oakland → Washington (D). See Round 4: Washington → Oakland.)
4	114	Atlanta Falcons	Tim Dwight	WR	Iowa	from Tampa Bay (Note: No. 114: Tampa Bay → Atlanta (D). See Round 2: Atlanta → Tampa Bay.)
4	115	New England Patriots	Leonta Rheams	DT	Houston	
4	116	Philadelphia Eagles	Clarence Love	S	Toledo	from NY Giants (Note: No. 116: NY Giants → Philadelphia (D). See Round 3: Philadelphia → NY Giants.)
4	117	Pittsburgh Steelers	Deshea Townsend	CB	Alabama	
4	118	Jacksonville Jaguars	Harry Deligianis	DT	Youngstown State	
4	119	San Francisco 49ers	Lance Schulters ^{†}	S	Hofstra	
4	120	Kansas City Chiefs	Greg Favors	LB	Mississippi State	
4	121	Green Bay Packers	Roosevelt Blackmon	CB	Morris Brown	
4	122	Denver Broncos	Curtis Alexander	RB	Alabama	
4*	123	Pittsburgh Steelers	Carlos King	RB	North Carolina State	
5	124	Baltimore Ravens	Martin Chase	DT	Oklahoma	from Indianapolis (Note: No. 124: Indianapolis → Baltimore (D). See Round 4: Baltimore → Indianapolis.)
5	125	Arizona Cardinals	Terry Hardy	TE	Southern Mississippi	
5	126	San Diego Chargers	Cedric Harden	DE	Florida A&M	
5	127	Oakland Raiders	Jeremy Brigham	TE	Washington	
5	128	Kansas City Chiefs	Robert Williams	CB	North Carolina	from Chicago (Note: No. 128: Chicago → Kansas City (PD). Chicago traded a fifth-round selection (128th overall) to Kansas City in exchange for WR Chris Penn.)
5	129	St. Louis Rams	Raymond Priester	FB	Clemson	
5	130	Dallas Cowboys	Darren Hambrick	LB	South Carolina	
5	131	Buffalo Bills	Jonathan Linton	FB	North Carolina	
5	132	New Orleans Saints	Wilmont Perry	RB	Livingstone	
5	133	Baltimore Ravens	Ryan Sutter	S	Colorado	
5	134	New York Jets	Casey Dailey	LB	Northwestern	from Philadelphia (Note: No. 134: Philadelphia → NY Jets (PD). See Round 2: Philadelphia → NY Jets.)
5	135	Indianapolis Colts	Antony Jordan	LB	Vanderbilt	from Cincinnati (Note: No. 135: Cincinnati → Indianapolis (PD). Cincinnati traded a fifth-round selection (135th overall) to Indianapolis in exchange for QB Paul Justin.)
5	136	Carolina Panthers	Jerry Jensen	LB	Washington	
5	137	Pittsburgh Steelers	Jason Simmons	S	Arizona State	from Atlanta (Note: No. 137: Atlanta → Pittsburgh (D). Atlanta traded a fifth-round selection (137th overall) to Pittsburgh in exchange for three seventh-round selections (199th, 203rd and 215th overall).)
5	138	Dallas Cowboys	Oliver Ross	T	Iowa State	from Seattle (Note: No. 138: Seattle → Dallas (D). Seattle traded a fifth-round selection (138th overall) to Dallas in exchange for sixth- and seventh-round selections (162nd and 197th overall).)
5	139	Tennessee Oilers	Benji Olson	G	Washington	
5	140	Washington Redskins	Mark Fischer	G	Purdue	
5	141	New York Jets	Doug Karczewski	T	Virginia	
5	142	Philadelphia Eagles	Ike Reese ^{†}	LB	Michigan State	from Miami (Note: No. 142: Miami → Philadelphia (D). See Round 4: Philadelphia → Miami.)
5	143	Miami Dolphins	Scott Shaw	G	Michigan State	from Detroit (Note: No. 143: Detroit → Miami (D). See Round 2: Miami → Detroit.)
5	144	Minnesota Vikings	Kerry Cooks	S	Iowa	
5	145	New England Patriots	Ron Merkerson	LB	Colorado	
5	146	New York Jets	Blake Spence	TE	Oregon	from Tampa Bay (Note: No. 146: Tampa Bay → NY Jets (PD). Tampa Bay traded a fifth-round selection (146th overall) to the NY Jets in exchange for FB Lorenzo Neal.)
5	147	New York Giants	Toby Myles	T	Jackson State	
5	148	Jacksonville Jaguars	John Wade	C	Marshall	
5	149	New York Jets	Eric Bateman	T	BYU	from Pittsburgh (Note: No. 149: Pittsburgh → NY Jets (D). See Round 2: NY Jets → Pittsburgh.)
5	150	Green Bay Packers	Corey Bradford	WR	Jackson State	from Kansas City (Note: No. 150: Kansas City → Green Bay (PD). Kansas City traded a fifth-round selection (150th overall) to Green Bay in exchange for LB Wayne Simmons.)
5	151	San Francisco 49ers	Phil Ostrowski	G	Penn State	
5	152	Oakland Raiders	Travian Smith	LB	Oklahoma	from Green Bay (Note: No. 152: Green Bay → Oakland (D). Green Bay traded a sixth-round selection (152nd overall) to Oakland in exchange for a sixth-round selection (156th overall) and a 1999 sixth-round selection.)
5	153	Denver Broncos	Chris Howard	RB	Michigan	
6	154	Baltimore Ravens	Ron Rogers	LB	Georgia Tech	from Indianapolis (Note: No. 154: Indianapolis → Baltimore (D). See Round 4: Baltimore → Indianapolis.)
6	155	San Diego Chargers	Clifford Ivory	CB	Troy State	
6	156	Green Bay Packers	Scott McGarrahan	S	New Mexico	from Oakland (Note: No. 152: Oakland → Green Bay (D). See Round 5: Green Bay → Oakland.)
6	157	Chicago Bears	Chris Draft	LB	Stanford	
6	158	Arizona Cardinals	Zach Walz	LB	Dartmouth	
6	159	St. Louis Rams	Glenn Roundtree	G	Clemson	
6	160	Buffalo Bills	Fred Coleman	WR	Washington	
6	161	New Orleans Saints	Chris Bordano	LB	Southern Methodist	
6	162	Seattle Seahawks	Carl Hansen	DT	Stanford	from Dallas (Note: No. 162: Dallas → Seattle (D). See Round 5: Seattle → Dallas.)
6	163	New York Jets	Eric Ogbogu	DE	Maryland	from Philadelphia (Note: No. 163: Philadelphia → NY Jets (PD). Philadelphia traded a sixth-round selection (163rd overall) to the NY Jets in exchange for WR Jeff Graham.)
6	164	Baltimore Ravens	Sammy Williams	T	Oklahoma	
6	165	Carolina Panthers	Damien Richardson	S	Arizona State	
6	166	Atlanta Falcons	Elijah Williams	CB	Florida	
6	167	Cincinnati Bengals	Jason Tucker	WR	Texas Christian	
6	168	Tennessee Oilers	Lee Wiggins	CB	South Carolina	
6	169	Seattle Seahawks	Bobby Shaw	WR	California	
6	170	Washington Redskins	Pat Palmer	WR	Northwestern State	
6	171	Miami Dolphins	Nate Strikwerda	C	Northwestern	
6	172	Miami Dolphins	John Dutton	QB	Nevada	from Detroit (Note: No. 172: Detroit → Miami (D). See Round 2: Miami → Detroit.)
6	173	Minnesota Vikings	Matt Birk ^{†}	C	Harvard	
6	174	New York Jets	Chris Brazzell	WR	Angelo State	
6	175	Tampa Bay Buccaneers	James Cannida	DT	Nevada	
6	176	New England Patriots	Harold Shaw	RB	Southern Mississippi	
6	177	New York Giants	Todd Pollack	TE	Boston College	
6	178	Pittsburgh Steelers	Chris Fuamatu-Ma'afala	FB	Utah	
6	179	Jacksonville Jaguars	LeManzer Williams	DE	Minnesota	
6	180	San Francisco 49ers	Fred Beasley ^{†}	FB	Auburn	
6	181	Kansas City Chiefs	Derrick Ransom	DT	Cincinnati	
6	182	Jacksonville Jaguars	Kevin McLeod	RB	Auburn	from Green Bay (Note: No. 182: Green Bay → Jacksonville (PD). Green Bay traded a sixth-round selection (182nd overall) to Jacksonville in exchange for DT Paul Frase.)
6	183	New York Jets	Dustin Johnson	FB	BYU	from Denver (Note: No. 183: Denver → NY Jets (PD). Denver traded a sixth-round selection (183rd overall) and 1997 third-, sixth- and seventh-round selections to the NY Jets in exchange for a 1997 third-round selection.)
6*	184	Tampa Bay Buccaneers	Shevin Smith	CB	Florida State	
6*	185	Detroit Lions	Jamaal Alexander	CB	Southern Mississippi	
6*	186	Pittsburgh Steelers	Ryan Olson	DT	Colorado	
6*	187	Green Bay Packers	Matt Hasselbeck ^{†}	QB	Boston College	
6*	188	Dallas Cowboys	Izell Reese	S	UAB	
6*	189	Chicago Bears	Patrick Mannelly	LS	Duke	
7	190	Indianapolis Colts	Aaron Taylor	C	Nebraska	
7	191	Washington Redskins	David Terrell	S	UTEP	from Oakland (Note: No. 191: Oakland → Washington (D). See Round 4: Washington → Oakland.)
7	192	Jacksonville Jaguars	Alvis Whitted	WR	North Carolina State	from Chicago (Note: No. 192: Chicago → Jacksonville (PD). Chicago traded a seventh-round selection (192nd overall) to Jacksonville in exchange for OT Jimmy Herndon.)
7	193	Arizona Cardinals	Phil Savoy	WR	Colorado	
7	194	San Diego Chargers	Jon Haskins	LB	Stanford	
7	195	New York Jets	Lawrence Hart	TE	Southern	from St. Louis (Note: No. 195: St. Louis → NY Jets (D). See Round 3: NY Jets → St. Louis.)
7	196	Carolina Panthers	Vili Maumau	DT	Colorado	from New Orleans (Note: No. 196: New Orleans → Carolina (PD). New Orleans sent a seventh-round selection (196th overall) to Carolina as compensation for signing restricted free agent S Chad Cota.)
7	197	Seattle Seahawks	Jason McEndoo	G	Washington State	from Dallas (Note: No. 197: Dallas → Seattle (D). See Round 5: Seattle → Dallas.)
7	198	Buffalo Bills	Victor Allotey	G	Indiana	
7	199	Atlanta Falcons	Ephraim Salaam	T	San Diego State	from Baltimore via Pittsburgh (Note: No. 199: Baltimore → Pittsburgh → Atlanta. Multiple trades: Baltimore → Pittsburgh (PD). Baltimore traded a seventh-round selection (199th overall) to Pittsburgh in exchange for G Bernard Dafney. Pittsburgh → Atlanta (D). See Round 5: Atlanta → Pittsburgh.)
7	200	Denver Broncos	Trey Teague	C	Tennessee	from Philadelphia (Note: No. 200: Philadelphia → Denver (D). Philadelphia traded a seventh-round selection (200th overall) to Denver in exchange for a 1999 sixth-round selection.)
7	201	Atlanta Falcons	Ken Oxendine	RB	Virginia Tech	
7	202	Cincinnati Bengals	Marcus Parker	FB	Virginia Tech	
7	203	Atlanta Falcons	Henry Slay	DT	West Virginia	from Carolina via Pittsburgh (Note: No. 203: Carolina → Pittsburgh → Atlanta. Multiple trades: Carolina → Pittsburgh (PD). Carolina traded a seventh-round selection (203rd overall) to Pittsburgh in exchange for DE Israel Raybon. Pittsburgh → Atlanta (D). See Round 5: Atlanta → Pittsburgh.)
7	204	New Orleans Saints	Andy McCullough	WR	Tennessee	from Seattle (Note: No. 204: Seattle → New Orleans (PD). Seattle traded a seventh-round selection (204th overall) to New Orleans in exchange for WR Daryl Hobbs.)
7	205	Tennessee Oilers	Jimmy Sprotte	LB	Arizona	
7	206	Washington Redskins	Antwaune Ponds	LB	Syracuse	
7	207	Detroit Lions	Chris Liwienski	G	Indiana	
7	208	Minnesota Vikings	Chester Burnett	LB	Arizona	
7	209	Arizona Cardinals	Jomo Cousins	DE	Florida A&M	from NY Jets
7	210	Miami Dolphins	Jim Bundren	G	Clemson	
7	211	New England Patriots	Jason Andersen	C	BYU	
7	212	Tampa Bay Buccaneers	Chance McCarty	DE	Texas Christian	
7	213	New York Giants	Ben Fricke	C	Houston	
7	214	Jacksonville Jaguars	Brandon Tolbert	LB	Georgia	
7	215	San Francisco 49ers	Ryan Thelwell	WR	Minnesota	from Pittsburgh via Atlanta (Note: No. 215: Pittsburgh → Atlanta → San Francisco. Multiple trades: Pittsburgh → Atlanta (D). See Round 5: Atlanta → Pittsburgh. Atlanta → San Francisco (D). Atlanta traded a seventh-round selection (215th overall) to San Francisco in exchange for a 1999 sixth-round selection.)
7	216	Kansas City Chiefs	Eric Warfield	CB	Nebraska	
7	217	Chicago Bears	Chad Overhauser	G	UCLA	from San Francisco (Note: No. 217: San Francisco → Chicago (PD). San Francisco traded a seventh-round selection (217th overall) to Chicago in exchange for LB Tony Peterson.)
7	218	Green Bay Packers	Edwin Watson	FB	Purdue	
7	219	Denver Broncos	Nate Wayne	LB	Mississippi	
7*	220	Philadelphia Eagles	Chris Akins	DT	Texas	
7*	221	Pittsburgh Steelers	Angel Rubio	DT	Southeast Missouri State	
7*	222	Cincinnati Bengals	Damian Vaughn	TE	Miami (OH)	
7*	223	Dallas Cowboys	Tarik Smith	RB	California	
7*	224	Kansas City Chiefs	Ernest Blackwell	RB	Missouri	
7*	225	Minnesota Vikings	Tony Darden	CB	Texas Tech	
7*	226	Arizona Cardinals	Pat Tillman	S	Arizona State	
7*	227	Dallas Cowboys	Antonio Fleming	G	Georgia	
7*	228	Carolina Panthers	Jim Turner	WR	Syracuse	
7*	229	Tennessee Oilers	Kevin Long	C	Florida State	
7*	230	Oakland Raiders	Vince Amey	DT	Arizona State	
7*	231	Indianapolis Colts	Cory Gaines	S	Tennessee	
7*	232	Chicago Bears	Moses Moreno	QB	Colorado State	
7*	233	Arizona Cardinals	Ron Janes	FB	Missouri	
7*	234	San Diego Chargers	Kio Sanford	WR	Kentucky	
7*	235	Oakland Raiders	David Sanders	DE	Arkansas	
7*	236	St. Louis Rams	Jason Chorak	LB	Washington	
7*	237	Dallas Cowboys	Rodrick Monroe	TE	Cincinnati	
7*	238	Buffalo Bills	Kamil Loud	WR	Cal Poly	
7*	239	New Orleans Saints	Ron Warner	LB	Kansas	
7*	240	Philadelphia Eagles	Melvin Thomas	G	Colorado	
7*	241	Baltimore Ravens	Cam Quayle	TE	Weber State	

== Supplemental draft ==
A supplemental draft was held in the summer of 1998. For each player selected in the supplemental draft, the team forfeits its pick in that round in the draft of the following season. The Green Bay Packers and San Diego Chargers each selected a player in the second round.

Rnd.	Pick	Team	Player	Pos.	College	Notes
2	—	Green Bay Packers	Mike Wahle ^{†}	G	Navy	
2	—	San Diego Chargers	Jamal Williams ^{†}	DT	Oklahoma State	

== Notable undrafted players ==
†	Pro Bowler

Original NFL team	Player	Pos.	College	Notes
Atlanta Falcons	Jody Littleton	LS	Baylor	
Atlanta Falcons	Jose Portilla	T	Arizona	
Baltimore Ravens	Lional Dalton	DT	Eastern Michigan	
Baltimore Ravens	Chuck Darby	DT	South Carolina State	
Baltimore Ravens	Jeff Saturday ^{†}	C	North Carolina	
Carolina Panthers	Rob Bohlinger	T	Wyoming	
Carolina Panthers	Thabiti Davis	WR	Wake Forest	
Carolina Panthers	Paul Janus	T	Northwestern	
Chicago Bears	Wasswa Serwanga	CB	UCLA	
Cincinnati Bengals	Brad Costello	P	Boston University	
Cincinnati Bengals	Damon Gibson	WR	Iowa	
Cincinnati Bengals	Adrian Ross	LB	Colorado State	
Cincinnati Bengals	Erik Storz	LB	Boston College	
Dallas Cowboys	Zebbie Lethridge	CB	Texas Tech	
Dallas Cowboys	Cory Geason	TE	Tulane	
Dallas Cowboys	Jeff Ogden	WR	Eastern Washington	
Dallas Cowboys	Tim Seder	K	Ashland	
Dallas Cowboys	Robert Thomas	FB	Henderson State	
Denver Broncos	Cyron Brown	DE	Western Illinois	
Denver Broncos	Chris Gizzi	LB	Air Force	
Detroit Lions	Kerlin Blaise	G	Miami (FL)	
Detroit Lions	Lamar Campbell	CB	Wisconsin	
Detroit Lions	Kevin O'Neill	LB	Bowling Green	
Detroit Lions	Travis Reece	RB	Michigan State	
Detroit Lions	Tawambi Settles	S	Duke	
Detroit Lions	Corey Thomas	WR	Duke	
Green Bay Packers	Jude Waddy	LB	William & Mary	
Indianapolis Colts	Larry Chester	DT	Temple	
Indianapolis Colts	Mike Vanderjagt ^{†}	K	West Virginia	
Jacksonville Jaguars	Damon Dunn	WR	Stanford	
Jacksonville Jaguars	Winfield Garnett	DT	Ohio State	
Jacksonville Jaguars	Reggie Swinton	WR	Murray State	
Jacksonville Jaguars	Steve Zahursky	G	Kent State	
Kansas City Chiefs	Eric Hicks	DE	Maryland	
Miami Dolphins	Chris Fontenot	TE	McNeese State	
Miami Dolphins	Antoine Simpson	DT	Houston	
Minnesota Vikings	Cory Withrow	C	Washington State	
New England Patriots	Scott Dragos	FB	Boston College	
New England Patriots	Kato Serwanga	CB	California	
New York Giants	Greg Comella	FB	Stanford	
New York Giants	Nate Hobgood-Chittick	DT	North Carolina	
New York Giants	Jason Whittle	G	Southwest Missouri State	
New York Giants	George Williams III	DL	NC State	
New Orleans Saints	Earl Little	S	Miami	
Oakland Raiders	Phil Dawson ^{†}	K	Texas	
Oakland Raiders	Rodney Williams	WR	Arizona	
Philadelphia Eagles	Kevin McKenzie	WR	Washington State	
Philadelphia Eagles	Kaseem Sinceno	TE	Syracuse	
Pittsburgh Steelers	Matt Cushing	TE	Illinois	
St. Louis Rams	Billy Austin	CB	New Mexico	
St. Louis Rams	Roger Chanoine	T	Temple	
St. Louis Rams	London Fletcher ^{†}	LB	John Carroll	
St. Louis Rams	Tony Horne	WR/KR	Clemson	
St. Louis Rams	Jeremy McKinney	G	Iowa	
San Diego Chargers	Wendell Davis	TE	Temple	
San Diego Chargers	DeMingo Graham	G	Hofstra	
San Diego Chargers	Kendyl Jacox	G	Kansas State	
San Diego Chargers	Lloyd Lee	S	Dartmouth	
San Diego Chargers	Henry Taylor	DT	South Carolina	
San Diego Chargers	Justin Watson	RB	San Diego State	
San Francisco 49ers	Tony Blevins	CB	Kansas	
San Francisco 49ers	Jim Nelson	LB	Penn State	
San Francisco 49ers	Brock Olivo	RB	Missouri	
Seattle Seahawks	Joey Eloms	S	Indiana	
Seattle Seahawks	Brian Finneran	WR	Villanova	
Seattle Seahawks	Dirk Johnson	P	Northern Colorado	
Seattle Seahawks	Wade Richey	K	LSU	
Seattle Seahawks	Paul Spicer	DE	Saginaw Valley State	
Tampa Bay Buccaneers	Rabih Abdullah	RB	Lehigh	
Tampa Bay Buccaneers	Lamont Hall	TE	Clemson	
Tampa Bay Buccaneers	Chris Jackson	WR	Washington State	
Tennessee Oilers	Perry Phenix	S	Southern Miss	
Tennessee Oilers	Ron Powlus	QB	Notre Dame	
Tennessee Oilers	Mike Sutton	DE	LSU	
Washington Redskins	Tim Denton	CB	Sam Houston State	

== Hall of Famers ==
- Randy Moss, wide receiver from Marshall, taken 1st round 21st overall by the Minnesota Vikings.

Inducted: Professional Football Hall of Fame Class of 2018.

- Peyton Manning, quarterback from Tennessee, taken 1st round 1st overall by the Indianapolis Colts.

Inducted: Professional Football Hall of Fame Class of 2021.

- Charles Woodson, cornerback from Michigan, taken 1st round 4th overall by the Oakland Raiders.

Inducted: Professional Football Hall of Fame Class of 2021.

- Alan Faneca, guard from LSU, taken 1st round 26th overall by the Pittsburgh Steelers.

Inducted: Professional Football Hall of Fame Class of 2021.

== Trades ==
In the explanations below, (D) denotes trades that took place during the 1998 draft, while (PD) indicates trades completed pre-draft.

Round 1

Round 2

Round 3

Round 4

Round 5

Round 6

Round 7
