= 1998 Philadelphia Eagles season =

NFL team season

- Owner: Jeffrey Lurie
- Head coach: Ray Rhodes
- Home stadium: Veterans Stadium

Results
- Record: 3–13
- Division place: 5th NFC East
- Playoffs: Did not qualify
- Pro Bowlers: None

The 1998 Philadelphia Eagles season was the franchise's 66th season in the National Football League (NFL). The team failed to improve on their previous output of 6–9–1, winning only three games. Head coach Ray Rhodes was fired at end of season, finishing his four-year tenure with a record of 29–34–1.

The Eagles’ 161 points-scored (10.06 per game) is tied for the third-lowest total in a 16-game schedule. Philadelphia’s three quarterbacks—Bobby Hoying, Koy Detmer, and Rodney Peete—each won one game, and threw for only seven total touchdowns combined.

== Offseason ==
=== Draft ===
The table shows the Eagles selections and what picks they had that were traded away and the team that ended up with that pick. It is possible the Eagles' pick ended up with this team via another team that the Eagles made a trade with. Not shown are acquired picks that the Eagles traded away.

1998 Philadelphia Eagles draft
Round	Selection	Player	Position	College	Notes
1	11	Tra Thomas	OT	Florida State	
2	41	Traded to Pittsburgh			
3	72	Jeremiah Trotter	LB	Stephen F. Austin	via Dallas
3	85	Allen Rossum	CB	Notre Dame	
4	102	Traded to Miami			
4	112	Brandon Whiting	DT	California	From Miami
4	116	Clarence Love	S	Toledo	
5	134	Traded to NY Jets			
5	142	Ike Reese	LB	Michigan State	
6	163	Traded to NY Jets			
7	199	Traded to Atlanta from Carolina via Pittsburgh			
7	220	Chris Akins	DT	Texas	Compensatory pick
7	240	Melvin Thomas	OG	Colorado	Compensatory pick

== Staff ==
1998 Philadelphia Eagles staff
Front office: Owner/chief executive officer – Jeffrey Lurie; Executive vice-president – Joe Banner; Director of football operations – Tom Modrak; Director of college scouting – John Goeller; Pro personnel coordinator – Mike McCartney; Head coaches: Head coach – Ray Rhodes; Offensive coaches: Offensive coordinator – Dana Bible; Offensive coordinator/offensive assistant – Bill Musgrave; Quarterbacks – Sean Payton; Running backs – Ted Williams; Wide receivers – Gerald Carr; Tight ends – Jim Bollman; Offensive line – Juan Castillo; Offensive assistant – Ken Zampese	Defensive coaches: Defensive coordinator – Emmitt Thomas; Defensive line – Mike Trgovac; Linebackers – Joe Vitt; Defensive backs – Danny Smith; Defensive assistant – Chuck Knox Jr.; Special teams coaches: Special teams – John Harbaugh; Strength and conditioning: Strength and conditioning – Mike Wolf; Assistant strength and conditioning – Tom Kanavy

== Roster ==
1998 Philadelphia Eagles roster
Quarterbacks (QB): 10 Koy Detmer; 7 Bobby Hoying; 9 Rodney Peete; Running backs (RB): 27 James Bostic; 39 Mike Reed; 22 Duce Staley; 34 Kevin Turner FB; 29 Corey Walker KR; Wide receivers (WR): 80 Irving Fryar; 81 Jeff Graham; 82 Karl Hankton; 83 Dietrich Jells; 88 Kevin McKenzie; 84 Freddie Solomon PR; Tight ends (TE): 85 Chris Fontenot; 49 Andrew Jordan	Offensive linemen (OL): 62 Ian Beckles G; 76 Barrett Brooks T; 77 Richard Cooper T; 66 Jerry Crafts G/T; 61 Steve Everitt C; 69 George Hegamin G; 71 Jermane Mayberry G; 65 Bubba Miller C; 72 Tra Thomas T; Defensive linemen (DL): 53 Hugh Douglas DE; 90 Jon Harris DE; 74 Ed Jasper DT; 79 Greg Jefferson DE; 73 Steve Martin DT; 95 Henry Slay DT; 96 Al Wallace DE; 98 Brandon Whiting DE/DT	Linebackers (LB): 56 Mike Caldwell OLB; 57 James Darling OLB; 52 Jon Haskins MLB; 58 Ike Reese OLB; 51 William Thomas OLB; 54 Jeremiah Trotter MLB; 50 James Willis MLB; Defensive backs (DB): 20 Brian Dawkins FS; 31 Al Harris CB; 28 Clarence Love CB; 35 Anthony Marshall SS; 24 Tim McTyer CB/S; 20 Allen Rossum CB; 21 Bobby Taylor CB; 23 Troy Vincent CB; 37 Sean Woodson FS; 36 Mike Zordich SS; Special teams (ST): 18 Chris Boniol K; 4 Tom Hutton P; 68 Morris Unutoa LS	Practice squad: 3 Nick Gallery P; 86 Harvey Middleton WR; 42 Marcus Wimberly S; 63 Steve Zahursky G/T; Reserve: 93 Chris Akins DT (NF-Inj.); 87 Jason Dunn TE (IR); 30 Charlie Garner RB (IR); 97 Rhett Hall DT (IR); 33 Aaron Hayden RB (IR); 94 Bill Johnson DT (IR); 59 Mike Mamula DE (IR); 89 Kaseem Sinceno TE (IR); 78 Hollis Thomas DT (IR); 75 Melvin Thomas G (NF-Inj.); 53 active, 10 inactive, 4 practice squad Rookies in italics

== Regular season ==
=== Schedule ===
Week	Date	Opponent	Result	Record	Venue	Attendance
1	September 6	Seattle Seahawks	**L** 0–38	0–1	Veterans Stadium	66,418
2	September 13	at Atlanta Falcons	**L** 12–17	0–2	Georgia Dome	46,456
3	September 20	at **Arizona Cardinals**	**L** 3–17	0–3	Sun Devil Stadium	39,782
4	September 27	Kansas City Chiefs	**L** 21–24	0–4	Veterans Stadium	66,675
5	October 4	at Denver Broncos	**L** 16–41	0–5	Mile High Stadium	73,218
6	October 11	**Washington Redskins**	**W** 17–12	1–5	Veterans Stadium	66,183
7	October 18	at San Diego Chargers	**L** 10–13	1–6	Qualcomm Stadium	56,967
8	Bye					
9	November 2	**Dallas Cowboys**	**L** 0–34	1–7	Veterans Stadium	67,002
10	November 8	Detroit Lions	**W** 10–9	2–7	Veterans Stadium	66,785
11	November 15	at **Washington Redskins**	**L** 3–28	2–8	Jack Kent Cooke Stadium	57,704
12	November 22	at **New York Giants**	**L** 0–20	2–9	Giants Stadium	65,763
13	November 29	at Green Bay Packers	**L** 16–24	2–10	Lambeau Field	59,862
14	December 3	St. Louis Rams	**W** 17–14	3–10	Veterans Stadium	66,155
15	December 13	**Arizona Cardinals**	**L** 17–20 (OT)	3–11	Veterans Stadium	62,176
16	December 20	at **Dallas Cowboys**	**L** 9–13	3–12	Texas Stadium	62,722
17	December 27	**New York Giants**	**L** 10–20	3–13	Veterans Stadium	66,596

Note: Intra-division opponents are in bold text.

=== Standings ===
NFC East
	W	L	T	PCT	PF	PA	STK
^{(3)} Dallas Cowboys	10	6	0	.625	381	275	W2
^{(6)} Arizona Cardinals	9	7	0	.563	325	378	W3
New York Giants	8	8	0	.500	287	309	W4
Washington Redskins	6	10	0	.375	319	421	L1
Philadelphia Eagles	3	13	0	.188	161	344	L3
