= Walt Harris (American football coach) =

American football player and coach (born 1946)

Biographical details
- Born: November 9, 1946 (age 80); South San Francisco, California, U.S.

Playing career
- 1964–1965: College of San Mateo
- 1966–1967: Pacific (CA)
- Position: Defensive back

Coaching career (HC unless noted)
- 1970: El Camino HS (CA)
- 1971–1973: Pacific (CA) (DB)
- 1974–1977: California (LB)
- 1978: Air Force (DB)
- 1978–1979: Michigan State (LB)
- 1980–1982: Illinois (QB)
- 1983–1988: Tennessee (OC/QB)
- 1989–1991: Pacific (CA)
- 1992–1994: New York Jets (QB)
- 1995–1996: Ohio State (QB)
- 1997–2004: Pittsburgh
- 2005–2006: Stanford
- 2009: Akron (QB)
- 2010: California (PA) (OC)

Head coaching record
- Overall: 69–85
- Bowls: 2–4

Accomplishments and honors

Championships
- 1 Big East (2004)

Awards
- 2× Big East Coach of the Year (1997, 2004); AFCA Region I coach of the year (2002)

Walter William Harris (born November 9, 1946) is an American former football player and coach. Harris served as the head football coach at the University of the Pacific in Stockton, California from 1989 to 1991, the University of Pittsburgh from 1997 to 2004, and at Stanford University from 2005 to 2006, compiling a career college football record of 69–85.

== Playing and coaching career ==
Harris attended El Camino High School in South San Francisco, California. Harris received a bachelor's degree in 1968 and a master's degree in 1969 from the University of the Pacific, where he played college football as a defensive back. One of his coaches was Buddy Ryan.

His first college coaching position was as the defensive backs coach at Pacific, and the first recruit he signed was Pete Carroll. After a series of brief stops coaching defense that included a year as the defensive backs coach for Bill Parcells at Air Force, Harris had a career breakthrough when Mike White hired him as a quarterbacks coach at Illinois where he helped develop Dave Wilson, Tony Eason and Jack Trudeau, each of whom would go on to play in the NFL. He was then hired as the offensive coordinator at the University of Tennessee under Johnny Majors, helping the Volunteers win four of five bowl games while he was there.

In 1989, he received his first head coaching opportunity at his alma mater Pacific, where he assembled a staff that included future National Football League head coaches Jon Gruden and Hue Jackson. Coincidentally his first game as a head coach was a 38–3 loss against his future team, the Pitt Panthers.

After three years coaching Pacific, Harris moved on to the NFL where he was the quarterbacks coach for the New York Jets from 1992 to 1994. A noted quarterback tutor, he helped Boomer Esiason return to form and earn a trip to the 1993 Pro Bowl.

He then spent two years as the quarterbacks coach at Ohio State working with future pro quarterbacks Bobby Hoying, Joe Germaine and Stanley Jackson.

=== Pittsburgh ===
Harris was hired to take over for his former mentor Johnny Majors as the head coach at the University of Pittsburgh in 1997, where the Pittsburgh Panthers football program was in decline. They had averaged just three wins per season over the previous five years and were coming off a 1996 season in which they had been outscored 266–13 in games against West Virginia, Ohio State, Miami, Syracuse and Notre Dame. He eventually led Pitt to five consecutive bowl games.

In 1997 the Panthers saw an immediate turnaround under Harris, who won Big East Coach of the Year honors. Pitt went to the Liberty Bowl, their first postseason game since 1989. The season included a nationally televised upset win on homecoming night against #21 Miami, another upset win over #15 Virginia Tech, and a triple overtime victory over West Virginia in the Backyard Brawl.

Pitt would post back-to-back losing seasons as they rebuilt in 1998 and 1999. The highlight of the 1999 season was a 37–27 win over Notre Dame in the final game at Pitt Stadium.

==== 2000 ====
The 2000 season would see the Panthers finish 7-5 and included a 12–0 shutout win over Penn State in the final game between the two rivals until 2016. They lost the Insight.com Bowl to Iowa State. Wide receiver Antonio Bryant won the Fred Biletnikoff Award as the nation's outstanding receiver.

==== 2001 ====
In 2001 the Panthers overcame a 1–5 start to finish the season with a six-game winning streak and a win over NC State in the Tangerine Bowl for their second straight 7-5 finish.

==== 2002 ====
In 2002, Pitt would achieve their first top-25 ranking in 11 years after an upset of unbeaten, #3 Virginia Tech in Blacksburg. They finished 9–4 after beating Oregon State, 38–13, in the Insight Bowl and ended the season ranked 19th. That year, Harris won the American Football Coaches Foundation (AFCA) Region I Coach of the Year.

==== 2003 ====
The Panthers began 2003 with high expectations. Prior to the season The Sporting News named the Pitt coaching staff the third best in the country. Pitt was ranked as high as 9th in the AP poll before a shocking loss to Toledo. They did upset #5 Virginia Tech to keep their hopes of winning the Big East alive before losses to Miami and West Virginia eliminated those hopes. They finished the season 8–5 but would drop out of the top-25 altogether after losing to Virginia in the Continental Tire Bowl. Larry Fitzgerald became the second Pitt wide receiver in four years to win the Fred Biletnikoff Award under the tutelage of Walt Harris. After the season Fitzgerald would become the 3rd overall pick in the NFL draft by the Arizona Cardinals.

==== 2004 ====
After a 2–2 start to the 2004 season which saw the Panthers need overtime to defeat FCS opponent Furman, the team would rally to close out the regular season on a three-game winning streak that included victories over Notre Dame and West Virginia. Pitt would finish the regular season ranked 19th with a record of 8-3 and win their first-ever conference championship (they had been an independent until 1991). They also earned the first Bowl Championship Series (BCS) game in school history, and their first major bowl appearance in 21 years, when they were invited to the Fiesta Bowl to face undefeated #5 Utah. Harris won the Big East Coach of the Year award for the second time.

==== Departure from Pitt ====
After seeing a handful of top recruits slip away on signing day in part because of their doubts over the Pitt athletic department's commitment to Harris, he spent much of 2004 seeking a contract extension with Pitt. His already uneasy relationship with the athletic department would deteriorate further when his agent took the unusual step of publicly pressuring the university to give his client a new contract and making comments critical of Pitt. Harris met one final time with the athletic department prior to the Fiesta Bowl but was denied an extension despite the team's accomplishments. Shortly after that meeting Harris was offered the head coaching position at Stanford and accepted. Many of his Pitt players considered the move to essentially be a firing. After accepting the Stanford job, Harris chose to coach the Panthers in the Fiesta Bowl where they lost to Utah 35–7 in his final game with Pitt. One final twist in the unusual breakup came when Harris, almost immediately after joining Stanford, fired the agent who had criticized Pitt.

He left with a record of 52-44 and the third-most games, fourth-most wins, and the most bowl appearances in school history and was replaced by former NFL coach and Pitt alum Dave Wannstedt.

=== Stanford ===
==== 2005 ====
In his first season as head coach at Stanford Harris posted a record of 5–6, including a 20–17 loss at home to UC Davis of the Great West Conference.

==== 2006 ====
In his second season as head coach the team posted a 1–11 record, the school's worst since going 0–10 in 1960. In a game against UCLA on October 1, 2006, Harris called for his quarterback to punt on 3rd down. Although the punt by Trent Edwards travelled 53 yards and pinned the Bruins at their own 13 yard line, Harris was heavily criticized for the decision in a 31–0 loss. He was fired on December 4, 2006, two days after Stanford's regular season ended. By the end of his tenure at Stanford, Harris had surpassed Jack Curtice with the lowest winning percentage in the history of Stanford football, with a .261 mark.

=== Akron ===
In February 2009 he joined the University of Akron coaching staff as quarterbacks coach and passing game coordinator, but the team struggled and head coach J. D. Brookhart lost his job at the end of the year.

=== California (PA) ===
In April 2010, Harris became the offensive coordinator at California University of Pennsylvania. He was replaced after one season and reportedly turned down an offer to join the coaching staff at Colorado.

== Coaching style ==
Despite playing as a defensive back at Pacific and beginning his coaching career on defense, he eventually established himself as an offensive-minded coach. Harris primarily used a variation of the West Coast offense throughout his career.

At Pitt, he developed a string of highly successful wide receivers including Latef Grim, Antonio Bryant, Larry Fitzgerald, and Greg Lee which led to the Panthers gaining a reputation as "Wide Receiver U."

Harris has been viewed by some players as difficult to work with. One article about his departure from Stanford called him a "disciplinarian" and reported that a player briefly quit the team in protest of his coaching style.

Harris also has a questionable history of play calling and game management. Hosting #20 Texas A&M in 2002, Pitt was penalized on back-to-back snaps for illegal shifts during an extra point attempt because deep snapper Jonathan Sitter wore #91. Longstanding football rules require at least six of the seven men on the line to have numbers between 50 and 79. When Eric Gill, who wore #45, shifted from guard to end in a "swinging gate" formation, only five players had numbers within the specified range. After the penalties the Panthers missed the extra point, which proved costly as they found themselves needing a two-point conversion to tie the game after a late touchdown. The conversion was unsuccessful and Pitt lost the game 14–12. In 2004 Harris had both of his quarterbacks, Tyler Palko and Joe Flacco, punt on third down and long in the same game in a loss to Nebraska. Harris was also criticized after the 2003 Continental Tire Bowl for under-utilizing Heisman Trophy runner-up and eventual third overall NFL draft pick Larry Fitzgerald.

== Personal life ==
After coaching Stanford, Harris moved back to the Pittsburgh area. He has been known to attend Pitt games and practices. He was an honorary captain for Pitt's 2016 game against Penn State. In 2018 Harris, along with Johnny Majors, were made the honorary coaches for Pitt's annual Blue-Gold game.

He has three children.

== Head coaching record ==
Year	Team	Overall	Conference	Standing	Bowl/playoffs	Coaches^{#}	AP^{°}
Pacific Tigers (Big West Conference) (1989–1991)
1989	Pacific	2–10	2–5	T–6th			
1990	Pacific	4–7	2–5	6th			
1991	Pacific	5–7	4–3	4th			
Pacific:		11–24	8–13				
Pittsburgh Panthers (Big East Conference) (1997–2004)
1997	Pittsburgh	6–6	4–3	T–3rd	L Liberty		
1998	Pittsburgh	2–9	0–7	8th			
1999	Pittsburgh	5–6	2–5	T–6th			
2000	Pittsburgh	7–5	4–3	T–3rd	L Insight.com		
2001	Pittsburgh	7–5	4–3	T–3rd	W Tangerine		
2002	Pittsburgh	9–4	5–2	3rd	W Insight	18	19
2003	Pittsburgh	8–5	5–2	3rd	L Continental Tire		
2004	Pittsburgh	8–4	4–2	T–1st	L Fiesta^{†}		25
Pittsburgh:		52–44	28–27				
Stanford Cardinal (Pacific-10 Conference) (2005–2006)
2005	Stanford	5–6	4–4	T–4th			
2006	Stanford	1–11	1–8	10th			
Stanford:		6–17	5–12				
Total:		69–85					
National championship Conference title Conference division title or championship game berth
^{†}Indicates BCS bowl.; ^{#}Rankings from final Coaches Poll.; ^{°}Rankings from final AP Poll.
