= 1996 All-Big East Conference football team =

American college football all-star team

The 1996 All-Big East Conference football team consists of American football players chosen as All-Big East Conference players for the 1996 NCAA Division I-A football season. The organizations selecting All-Big East teams in 1996 included the conference coaches.

== Defensive selections ==
=== Quarterbacks ===
- Donovan McNabb, Syracuse (Coaches-1)
- Jim Druckenmiller, Virginia Tech (Coaches-1)
- Ryan Clement, Miami (FL) (Coaches-2)

=== Running backs ===
- Ken Oxendine, Virginia Tech (Coaches-1)
- Amos Zereoue, West Virginia (Coaches-1)
- Omari Walker, Boston College (Coaches-2)
- Malcolm Thomas, Syracuse (Coaches-2)

=== Wide receivers ===
- David Saunders, West Virginia (Coaches-1)
- Van Johnson, Temple (Coaches-1)
- Yatil Green, Miami (FL) (Coaches-2)
- Rahsaan Vanterpool, West Virginia (Coaches-2)

=== Tight ends ===
- Bryan Jennings, Virginia Tech (Coaches-1)
- Chris Jones, Miami (FL) (Coaches-2)

=== Offensive line ===
- J Ina, Miami (FL) (Coaches-1)
- Mark Mori, Boston College (Coaches-1)
- K.C. Jones, Miami (FL) (Coaches-1)
- Bill Conaty, Virginia Tech (Coaches-1)
- Shelton Prescott, Syracuse (Coaches-1)
- Jay Hagood, Virginia Tech (Coaches-2)
- Mike Horn, West Virginia (Coaches-2)
- T.J. Washington, Virginia Tech (Coaches-2)
- Scott Kiernan, Syracuse (Coaches-2)
- Dan Oriskovich, Boston College (Coaches-2)

== Defensive selections ==
=== Defensive line ===
- Stalin Colinet, Boston College (Coaches-1)
- Kenny Holmes, Miami (FL) (Coaches-1)
- Cornell Brown, Virginia Tech (Coaches-1)
- Canute Curtis, West Virginia (Coaches-1)
- Kenard Lang, Miami (FL) (Coaches-2)
- Antonio Anderson, Syracuse (Coaches-2)
- Bernard Russ, West Virginia (Coaches-2)
- Henry Slay, West Virginia (Coaches-2)

=== Linebackers ===
- James Burgess, Miami (FL) (Coaches-1)
- Twan Russell, Miami (FL) (Coaches-1)
- Nate Hemsley, Syracuse (Coaches-1)
- Alshermond Singleton, Temple (Coaches-1)
- Antwaune Ponds, Syracuse (Coaches-2)
- Myron Newsome, Virginia Tech (Coaches-2)
- Brandon Semones, Virginia Tech (Coaches-2)

=== Cornerbacks ===
- Kevin Abrams, Syracuse (Coaches-1)
- Mike Logan, West Virginia (Coaches-1)
- Earl Little, Miami (FL) (Coaches-2)
- Antonio Banks, Virginia Tech (Coaches-2)

=== Safeties ===
- Donovin Darius, Syracuse (Coaches-1)
- Vann Washington, West Virginia (Coaches-1)
- Tremain Mack, Miami (FL) (Coaches-2)
- Torrian Gray, Virginia Tech (Coaches-2)

== Special teams ==
=== Kickers ===
- Shayne Graham, Virginia Tech (Coaches-1)
- Andy Crosland, Miami (FL) (Coaches-2)
- Nathan Trout, Syracuse (Coaches-2)

=== Punters ===
- Nate Cochran, Pitt (Coaches-1)
- Sean Reali, Syracuse (Coaches-2)

=== Return specialist ===
- Tramaine Mack, Miami (FL) (Coaches-1)
- Jim Turner, Syracuse (Coaches-1)
- Mike Logan, West Virginia (Coaches-2)

== Key ==
Coaches, selected by the conference coaches

== See also ==
- 1996 All-America college football team
