= 1997 Syracuse Orangemen football team =

American college football season

1997 Syracuse Orangemen football

Big East champion

Fiesta Bowl, L 18–35 vs. Kansas State
- Conference: Big East Conference

Ranking
- Coaches: No. 20
- AP: No. 21
- Record: 9–4 (6–1 Big East)
- Head coach: Paul Pasqualoni (7th season)
- Offensive coordinator: Kevin Rogers (1st season)
- Defensive coordinator: Norm Gerber (14th season)
- Captains: Keith Downing; Donovin Darius; Rod Gadson; Brad Patkochis
- Home stadium: Carrier Dome

1997 Big East Conference football standings
	Conf.			Overall
Team	W		L	W		L
No. 21 Syracuse $	6	–	1	9	–	4
Virginia Tech	5	–	2	7	–	5
Pittsburgh	4	–	3	6	–	6
West Virginia	4	–	3	7	–	5
Miami (FL)	3	–	4	5	–	6
Temple	3	–	4	3	–	8
Boston College	3	–	4	4	–	7
Rutgers	0	–	7	0	–	11
$ – Conference champion; Rankings from AP Poll

The 1997 Syracuse Orangemen football team represented Syracuse University as a member of the Big East Conference during the 1997 NCAA Division I-A football season. Led by seventh-year head coach Paul Pasqualoni, the Orangemen compiled an overall record of 9–4 with a mark of 6–1 in conference play, winning the Big East title. Syracuse was invited to the Fiesta Bowl, where the Orangemen lost to Kansas State. The team played home games at the Carrier Dome in Syracuse, New York.

== Schedule ==
Date	Time	Opponent	Rank	Site	TV	Result	Attendance	Source
August 24	1:00 pm	No. 24 Wisconsin*	No. 17	Giants Stadium; East Rutherford, NJ (Kickoff Classic)	ABC	W 34–0	51,185	
August 30	12:00 pm	NC State*	No. 13	Carrier Dome; Syracuse, NY		L 31–32 ^{OT}	42,742	
September 6	2:30 pm	at Oklahoma*		Oklahoma Memorial Stadium; Norman, OK	ABC	L 34–36	68,342	
September 13	6:00 pm	at No. 22 Virginia Tech		Lane Stadium; Blacksburg, VA	ESPN	L 3–31	50,137	
September 20	6:00 pm	Tulane*		Carrier Dome; Syracuse, NY	ESPN2	W 30–19	42,246	
October 4	12:30 pm	East Carolina*		Carrier Dome; Syracuse, NY		W 56–0	44,054	
October 9	8:00 pm	at Rutgers		Rutgers Stadium; Piscataway, NJ		W 50–3	19,044	
October 18	12:00 pm	Temple		Carrier Dome; Syracuse, NY		W 60–7	47,720	
November 1	7:30 pm	No. 17 West Virginia		Carrier Dome; Syracuse, NY (rivalry)	ESPN	W 40–10	49,273	
November 8	3:30 pm	Boston College	No. 22	Carrier Dome; Syracuse, NY	CBS	W 20–13	49,153	
November 15	12:00 pm	at Pittsburgh	No. 19	Pitt Stadium; Pittsburgh, PA (rivalry)	ESPN Plus	W 32–27	46,102	
November 29	3:30 pm	at Miami (FL)	No. 16	Miami Orange Bowl; Miami, FL	CBS	W 33–13	25,147	
December 31	7:00 pm	vs. No. 10 Kansas State*	No. 14	Sun Devil Stadium; Tempe AZ (Fiesta Bowl)	CBS	L 18–35	69,367	
*Non-conference game; Rankings from AP Poll released prior to the game; All times are in Eastern time

== Rankings ==
Ranking movements Legend: ██ Increase in ranking ██ Decrease in ranking — = Not ranked
	Week																	
Poll	Pre	1	2	3	4	5	6	7	8	9	10	11	12	13	14	15	16	Final
AP	16	13	—	—	—	—	—	—	—	—	—	22	21	18	16	15	14	21
Coaches	16		—	—	—	—	—	—	—	25	24	19	19	17	16	15	14	20

== Roster ==
1997 Syracuse Orangemen football team roster
Players
Coaches
Offense

Pos.	#	Name	Class
WR	12	Kevin Johnson	Jr
TE	89	Kaseem Sinceno	Sr
FB	44	Rob Konrad	Jr
QB	5	Donovan McNabb	Jr
WR	15	Jim Turner	Sr
WR	8	Quinton Spotwood	So
RB	28	Kyle McIntosh	Jr
FB	35	Nick Sudano	So
TE	85	Roland Williams	Sr

Defense

Pos.	#	Name	Class
OLB	33	Keith Bulluck	So
FS	20	Donovin Darius	Sr
RCB	9	Rod Gadson	Sr
LCB	10	Phil Nash	Jr
SS	34	Tebucky Jones	Sr
MLB	50	Antwaune Ponds	Sr
OLB	52	Morlon Greenwood	Fr

Special teams

Pos.	#	Name	Class

Head coach

- Paul Pasqualoni

Coordinators/assistant coaches

Legend

- (C) Team captain
- (S) Suspended
- (I) Ineligible
- Injured
- Redshirt
