= 1997 Liberty Bowl =

1997 AXA Liberty Bowl
- 39th Liberty Bowl
Pittsburgh Panthers	Southern Miss Golden Eagles
(6–5)	(8–3)
Big East	C-USA
7	41
Head coach: Walt Harris	Head coach: Jeff Bower
	AP / Coaches / BA; 22 / 22 / 22
	1	2	3	4	Total
Pittsburgh	0	7	0	0	7
Southern Miss	7	7	14	13	41
- Date: December 31, 1997
- Season: 1997
- Stadium: Liberty Bowl Memorial Stadium
- Location: Memphis, Tennessee
- MVP: WR Sherrod Gideon (Southern Miss)
- Referee: Courtney Mauzy (ACC)
- Attendance: 50,209

United States TV coverage
- Network: ESPN

The 1997 Liberty Bowl was a college football bowl game played on December 31, 1997, in Memphis, Tennessee. The 39th edition of the Liberty Bowl, the game featured the Pittsburgh Panthers and the Southern Miss Golden Eagles.

== Background ==
Even though they finished third in the Big East Conference, Pittsburgh had won half as many games as they had won the past four seasons (12) in just one season, under new coach Walt Harris. In their second year of Conference USA play, the Golden Eagles won their second-straight Conference USA championship, the first time they repeated as conference champs since 1951 when still part of the Gulf States Conference. This was the first Liberty Bowl for both teams.

== Game summary ==
By the time Pittsburgh had added a touchdown catch late in the 2nd quarter, it was 14–0 Southern Miss, on two Gideon touchdowns. As it turned out, that would be the Panthers' last points as the Golden Eagles dominated in the second half with 27 unanswered points. Perry Phenix started it off with a fumble recovery for a touchdown to make it 21–7, and Gideon caught his third touchdown to make it 28–7 as the third quarter ended. The fourth quarter proved to be the death blow for Pittsburgh as in a span of 2:40 Adalius Thomas and Terrance Parrish both returned interceptions for touchdowns as Southern Miss' offensive and defensive attack proved too much for the Panthers, whose three turnover doomed them despite having 440 total yards and having the ball for 32:55. Sherrod Gideon caught three touchdown passes from Lee Roberts (who went 18 of 26 for 227 yards) and was named MVP. This would remain the biggest margin of victory in Liberty Bowl history until 2013.

== Aftermath ==
Southern Miss has returned twice to the Liberty Bowl (1999, 2003), while Pittsburgh has not.

== Statistics ==
Statistics	Pittsburgh	USM
First downs	16	15
Yards rushing	150	125
Yards passing	190	227
Return yards	100	164
Total yards	440	516
Punts-Average	7-40.3	7-36.3
Fumbles-Lost	1-1	0-0
Interceptions	2	1
Penalties-Yards	8-72	6-40
