= 1997 Rutgers Scarlet Knights football team =

American college football season

1997 Rutgers Scarlet Knights football
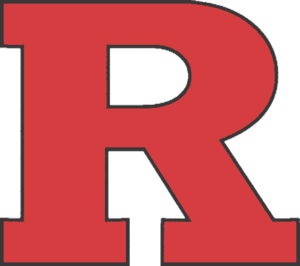
- Conference: Big East Conference
- Record: 0–11 (0–7 Big East)
- Head coach: Terry Shea (2nd season)
- Offensive coordinator: Terry Shea (2nd season)
- Defensive coordinator: Rod Sharpless (2nd season)
- Home stadium: Rutgers Stadium

1997 Big East Conference football standings
	Conf.			Overall
Team	W		L	W		L
No. 21 Syracuse $	6	–	1	9	–	4
Virginia Tech	5	–	2	7	–	5
Pittsburgh	4	–	3	6	–	6
West Virginia	4	–	3	7	–	5
Miami (FL)	3	–	4	5	–	6
Temple	3	–	4	3	–	8
Boston College	3	–	4	4	–	7
Rutgers	0	–	7	0	–	11
$ – Conference champion; Rankings from AP Poll

The 1997 Rutgers Scarlet Knights football team represented Rutgers University in the 1997 NCAA Division I-A football season. In their second season under head coach Terry Shea, the Scarlet Knights compiled a 0–11 record, were outscored by opponents 496 to 191, and finished in last place in the Big East Conference. The team's statistical leaders included Mike McMahon with 1,259 passing yards, Jacki Crooks with 758 rushing yards, and Walter King with 445 receiving yards.

== Schedule ==
Date	Time	Opponent	Site	TV	Result	Attendance	Source
August 30	12:30 pm	Virginia Tech	Rutgers Stadium; Piscataway, NJ	ESPN	L 19–59	26,713	
September 6	7:00 pm	at No. 12 Texas*	Darrell K Royal–Texas Memorial Stadium; Austin, TX	FSN	L 14–48	70,882	
September 13		at Navy*	Navy–Marine Corps Memorial Stadium; Annapolis, MD		L 7–36		
September 20	12:00 pm	Boston College	Rutgers Stadium; Piscataway, NJ	ESPN Plus	L 21–35	21,117	
October 4	12:00 pm	at West Virginia	Mountaineer Field; Morgantown, WV	ESPN Plus	L 0–48		
October 9	8:00 pm	Syracuse	Rutgers Stadium; Piscataway, NJ	ESPN	L 3–50	19,044	
October 18		at Army*	Michie Stadium; West Point, NY		L 35–37		
October 25	12:00 pm	Pittsburgh	Rutgers Stadium; Piscataway, NJ	ESPN Plus	L 48–55 ^{2OT}	16,581	
November 1		at Temple	Veterans Stadium; Philadelphia, PA		L 7–49		
November 8	12:00 pm	Wake Forest*	Rutgers Stadium; Piscataway, NJ	ESPN Plus	L 14–28	11,717	
November 15	12:00 pm	at Miami (FL)	Miami Orange Bowl; Miami, FL	ESPN Plus	L 23–51	19,949	
*Non-conference game; Rankings from AP Poll released prior to the game; All times are in Eastern time

== Roster ==
1997 Rutgers Scarlet Knights football team roster
Players
Coaches
Offense

Pos.	#	Name	Class
TE	89	Joey Jones	Sr
QB	12	Mike Jones	So
QB	17	Mike McMahon	Fr
C	66	Shaun O'Hara	Jr

Defense

Pos.	#	Name	Class
DB	10	Kevin Williams	Sr

Special teams

Pos.	#	Name	Class

Head coach

- Terry Shea

Coordinators/assistant coaches

Legend

- (C) Team captain
- (S) Suspended
- (I) Ineligible
- Injured
- Redshirt
