= Brandon Whiting =

American football player (born 1976)

No. 94, 98
- Positions: Defensive end, defensive tackle

Personal information
- Born: July 30, 1976 (age 50); Santa Rosa, California, U.S.
- Listed height: 6 ft 3 in (1.91 m)
- Listed weight: 285 lb (129 kg)

Career information
- High school: Long Beach Polytechnic (Long Beach, California)
- College: California
- NFL draft: 1998: 4th round, 112th overall pick

Career history
- Philadelphia Eagles (1998–2003); San Francisco 49ers (2004)

Awards and highlights
- 2× Second-team All-Pac-10 (1996, 1997)

Career NFL statistics
- Total tackles: 189
- Sacks: 16.5
- Forced fumbles: 2
- Fumble recoveries: 10
- Interceptions: 1
- Defensive touchdowns: 1
- Stats at Pro Football Reference

Brandon Renee Whiting (born July 30, 1976) is an American former professional football player who was a defensive end in the National Football League (NFL). He played college football for the California Golden Bears and was selected by the Philadelphia Eagles in the fourth round of the 1998 NFL draft. He also played for the San Francisco 49ers.

== Early life ==
Whiting played high school football at Long Beach Polytechnic High School in Long Beach, California.

== College career ==
Whiting played college football for the California Golden Bears and was a four-year starter for the team. He was twice a team captain and was named second-team All-Pac-12 in both his junior and senior seasons. He majored in developmental studies at the University of California, Berkeley.

== Professional career ==
=== Philadelphia Eagles ===
Whiting was selected by the Philadelphia Eagles in the fourth round of the 1998 NFL draft. In 2004, he was traded to the San Francisco 49ers along with a 5th round draft pick for wide receiver Terrell Owens.

== NFL career statistics ==
Legend
**Bold**	Career high

=== Regular season ===
Year	Team	Games		Tackles				Interceptions				Fumbles			
Year	Team	GP	GS	Comb	Solo	Ast	Sck	Int	Yds	TD	Lng	FF	FR	Yds	TD
1998	PHI	16	5	18	14	4	1.5	0	0	0	0	0	1	**24**	0
1999	PHI	13	2	16	9	7	1.0	**1**	**22**	**1**	**22**	0	0	0	0
2000	PHI	16	11	34	22	12	3.5	0	0	0	0	**1**	2	0	0
2001	PHI	13	12	26	15	11	2.5	0	0	0	0	0	**3**	0	0
2002	PHI	16	15	39	23	**16**	**6.0**	0	0	0	0	0	**3**	0	0
2003	PHI	14	14	**45**	**32**	13	2.0	0	0	0	0	**1**	1	0	0
2004	SFO	5	5	11	8	3	0.0	0	0	0	0	0	0	0	0
Total		93	64	189	123	66	16.5	1	22	1	22	2	10	24	0

=== Playoffs ===
Year	Team	Games		Tackles				Interceptions				Fumbles			
Year	Team	GP	GS	Comb	Solo	Ast	Sck	Int	Yds	TD	Lng	FF	FR	Yds	TD
2000	PHI	2	2	1	1	0	0.0	0	0	0	0	0	0	0	0
2001	PHI	3	3	7	6	1	0.0	0	0	0	0	0	0	0	0
2002	PHI	2	2	**11**	**7**	**4**	**1.0**	0	0	0	0	0	0	0	0
2003	PHI	2	2	4	3	1	0.0	0	0	0	0	0	0	0	0
Total		9	9	23	17	6	1.0	0	0	0	0	0	0	0	0
