= 1997 Pittsburgh Panthers football team =

American college football season

1997 Pittsburgh Panthers football

Liberty Bowl, L 7–41 vs. Southern Miss
- Conference: Big East Conference
- Record: 6–6 (4–3 Big East)
- Head coach: Walt Harris (1st season)
- Offensive coordinator: Steve Mooshagian (1st season)
- Offensive scheme: West Coast
- Defensive coordinator: Larry Coyer (1st season)
- Base defense: Multiple 4–3
- Home stadium: Pitt Stadium

1997 Big East Conference football standings
	Conf.			Overall
Team	W		L	W		L
No. 21 Syracuse $	6	–	1	9	–	4
Virginia Tech	5	–	2	7	–	5
Pittsburgh	4	–	3	6	–	6
West Virginia	4	–	3	7	–	5
Miami (FL)	3	–	4	5	–	6
Temple	3	–	4	3	–	8
Boston College	3	–	4	4	–	7
Rutgers	0	–	7	0	–	11
$ – Conference champion; Rankings from AP Poll

The 1997 Pittsburgh Panthers football team represented the University of Pittsburgh in the 1997 NCAA Division I-A football season.

== Schedule ==
Date	Time	Opponent	Site	TV	Result	Attendance	Source
August 30	3:30 p.m.	Southwestern Louisiana*	Pitt Stadium; Pittsburgh, PA		W 45–13	34,802	
September 6	3:30 p.m.	at No. 2 Penn State*	Beaver Stadium; University Park, PA (rivalry)	ABC	L 17–34	97,115	
September 13	3:00 p.m.	at Houston*	Robertson Stadium; Houston, TX	FSN	W 35–24	17,611	
September 18	8:00 p.m.	No. 21 Miami (FL)	Pitt Stadium; Pittsburgh, PA	ESPN	W 21–17	40,194	
October 4	12:00 p.m.	at Temple	Veterans Stadium; Philadelphia, PA	ESPN Plus	L 13–17	10,334	
October 11	3:30 p.m.	Notre Dame*	Pitt Stadium; Pittsburgh, PA (rivalry)	CBS	L 21–45	47,306	
October 25	12:00 p.m.	at Rutgers	Rutgers Stadium; Piscataway, NJ	ESPN Plus	W 55–48 ^{2OT}	16,581	
November 1	12:00 p.m.	at Boston College	Alumni Stadium; Chestnut Hill, MA		L 21–22	34,796	
November 15	12:00 p.m.	No. 19 Syracuse	Pitt Stadium; Pittsburgh, PA (rivalry)	ESPN Plus	L 27–32	46,102	
November 22	3:30 p.m.	No. 15 Virginia Tech	Pitt Stadium; Pittsburgh, PA		W 30–23	30,144	
November 28	2:30 p.m.	at West Virginia	Mountaineer Field; Morgantown, WV (Backyard Brawl)	CBS	W 41–38 ^{3OT}	48,044	
December 31	3:30 p.m.	vs. Southern Miss*	Liberty Bowl Memorial Stadium; Memphis, TN (Liberty Bowl)	ESPN	L 7–41	50,209	
*Non-conference game; Rankings from AP Poll released prior to the game; All times are in Eastern time

== Coaching staff ==
1997 Pittsburgh Panthers football staff
Coaching staff: Walt Harris – Head coach; Larry Coyer – Defensive coordinator; Steve Mooshagian – Offensive coordinator/wide receivers; J.D. Brookhart – Tight ends/special teams assistant; Curt Cignetti – Recruiting coordinator/quarterbacks; Tom Freeman – Offensive line; Bob Junko – Defensive tackles; Bill McGovern – Defensive backs; Vincent White – Running backs; Brian Williams – Defensive ends/Special teams	Support staff: Chris LaSala – Director of football operations; Brian Callahan – Graduate assistant; Jeff Jordan – Graduate assistant	Strength and conditioning staff: Buddy Morris – Strength and conditioning Coach; Mark Kostek – Assistant Strength and Conditioning Coach

== Team players drafted into the NFL ==
Player	Position	Round	Pick	NFL club
No Players Selected
