= 1997 Temple Owls football team =

American college football season

1997 Temple Owls football
- Conference: Big East Conference
- Record: 3–8 (3–4 Big East)
- Head coach: Ron Dickerson (5th season)
- Offensive coordinator: Lew Carpenter (1st season)
- Defensive coordinator: Ron McCrone (1st season)
- Home stadium: Veterans Stadium; Franklin Field

1997 Big East Conference football standings
	Conf.			Overall
Team	W		L	W		L
No. 21 Syracuse $	6	–	1	9	–	4
Virginia Tech	5	–	2	7	–	5
Pittsburgh	4	–	3	6	–	6
West Virginia	4	–	3	7	–	5
Miami (FL)	3	–	4	5	–	6
Temple	3	–	4	3	–	8
Boston College	3	–	4	4	–	7
Rutgers	0	–	7	0	–	11
$ – Conference champion; Rankings from AP Poll

The 1997 Temple Owls football team represented Temple University as a member of the Big East Conference during the 1997 NCAA Division I-A football season. Led by Ron Dickerson in his fifth and final season as head coach, the Owls compiled an overall record of 3–8 with a mark of 3–4 in conference play, placing in a three-way tie for fifth in the Big East. Temple played home games at Veterans Stadium and Franklin Field in Philadelphia.

== Schedule ==
Date	Time	Opponent	Site	Result	Attendance	Source
August 28		at Western Michigan*	Waldo Stadium; Kalamazoo, MI	L 14–34		
September 6	12:00 pm	Boston College	Franklin Field; Philadelphia, PA	W 28–21	5,085	
September 13	1:00 pm	at No. 1 Penn State*	Beaver Stadium; University Park, PA	L 10–52	96,735	
September 20	6:00 pm	No. 18 Virginia Tech	Veterans Stadium; Philadelphia, PA	L 13–23	12,056	
September 27		Maryland*	Franklin Field; Philadelphia, PA	L 21–24	12,872	
October 4	12:00 pm	Pittsburgh	Franklin Field; Philadelphia, PA	W 17-13	10,334	
October 18	12:00 pm	at Syracuse	Carrier Dome; Syracuse, NY	L 7–60	47,720	
October 25	12:00 pm	at Miami (FL)	Miami Orange Bowl; Miami, FL	L 15–47	26,351	
November 1		Rutgers	Veterans Stadium; Philadelphia, PA	W 49–7		
November 8		at Navy*	Navy–Marine Corps Memorial Stadium; Annapolis, MD	L 17–49		
November 15	1:00 pm	at West Virginia	Mountaineer Field; Morgantown, WV	L 21–41	37,061	
*Non-conference game; Rankings from AP Poll released prior to the game
