= Tra Thomas =

American football player and coach (born 1974)

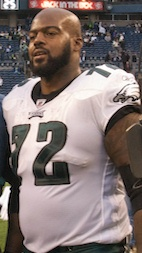
- Thomas with the Philadelphia Eagles in 2008

No. 72
- Position: Offensive tackle

Personal information
- Born: November 20, 1974 (age 51); DeLand, Florida, U.S.
- Listed height: 6 ft 8 in (2.03 m)
- Listed weight: 316 lb (143 kg)

Career information
- High school: DeLand
- College: Florida State
- NFL draft: 1998: 1st round, 11th overall pick

Career history

Playing
- Philadelphia Eagles (1998–2008); Jacksonville Jaguars (2009); San Diego Chargers (2010)*
- * Offseason or practice squad member only

Coaching
- Philadelphia Eagles (2013–2014) Offensive assistant; IMG Academy (2021-present) Offensive line coach

Awards and highlights
- Second-team All-Pro (2002); 3× Pro Bowl (2001, 2002, 2004); Philadelphia Eagles Hall of Fame; Philadelphia Eagles 75th Anniversary Team; National champion (1993); Second-team All-American (1997); First-team All-ACC (1997)

Career NFL statistics
- Games played: 174
- Games started: 168
- Fumble recoveries: 2
- Stats at Pro Football Reference

William "Tra" Thomas III (born November 20, 1974) is an American football coach and former player who is the offensive line coach for IMG Academy. He played as an offensive tackle in the National Football League (NFL), primarily for the Philadelphia Eagles. Thomas played college football for the Florida State Seminoles. He was selected by the Eagles with the 11th overall pick in the 1998 NFL draft. He played for the Eagles for 11 seasons, from 1998–2008.

Thomas was also a member of the Jacksonville Jaguars and San Diego Chargers. He was a one-time All-Pro and three-time Pro Bowl selection in his career.

== Early life ==
Thomas attended DeLand High School in DeLand, Florida and was a letterman in football.

== Professional career ==
Pre-draft measurables
Height	Weight	Arm length	Hand span	Bench press
6 ft 7 3/4 in (2.03 m)	349 lb (158 kg)	36 1/2 in (0.93 m)	10 1/4 in (0.26 m)	24 reps
All values from NFL Combine

=== Philadelphia Eagles ===
Thomas was selected by the Philadelphia Eagles in the first round with the 11th overall pick in the 1998 NFL draft. He played for the Eagles from 1998–2008, starting 165 of 166 games at left offensive tackle. He made three Pro Bowls with the Eagles.

=== Jacksonville Jaguars ===
On March 9, 2009, Thomas signed with the Jacksonville Jaguars as a free agent. He was released on February 11, 2010.

=== San Diego Chargers ===
Thomas was signed by the San Diego Chargers to a one-year contract on June 9, 2010. He underwent arthroscopic surgery on his knee during training camp.

=== Retirement ===
Thomas officially retired from the NFL as a Philadelphia Eagle on August 16, 2012.

== Coaching career ==
Thomas rejoined the Philadelphia Eagles as a coaching intern in 2013, working primarily with the offensive line. He was hired following training camp as an offensive assistant coach. His contract expired after the 2014 season and he was not re-signed.

He is currently the offensive line coach at IMG Academy in Bradenton, Florida.

== Broadcast career ==
In 2011, Thomas replaced Vaughn Hebron as an analyst for Eagles Post Game Live on Comcast SportsNet Philadelphia, which airs after every Philadelphia Eagles game. In 2019, Thomas joined 97.5 WPEN for their morning broadcast with Marc Farzetta. On March 31, 2020, Thomas was let go from 97.5 due to cutbacks by Beasely Media Group.

== Name changes ==
Thomas' given name is William Thomas III; during the Ray Rhodes era, the Eagles had a Pro Bowl linebacker also named William Thomas. During his early years in the NFL, Thomas was referred to by his nickname, "Tra". However, before the 2006 season, Thomas requested to be called William Thomas. In April 2008, he decided to return to Tra Thomas after the name William failed to catch on.
