= Clarence Love =

American football player (born 1976)

No. 28, 35, 38
- Position: Safety

Personal information
- Born: June 16, 1976 (age 50); Jackson, Michigan, U.S.
- Listed height: 5 ft 10 in (1.78 m)
- Listed weight: 180 lb (82 kg)

Career information
- High school: Jackson
- College: Toledo
- NFL draft: 1998: 4th round, 116th overall pick

Career history
- Philadelphia Eagles (1998); Frankfurt Galaxy (1999); Jacksonville Jaguars (1999)*; Baltimore Ravens (1999–2000); Oakland Raiders (2002–2004)
- * Offseason or practice squad member only

Awards and highlights
- Super Bowl champion (XXXV); First-team All-MAC (1997); Second-team All-MAC (1996)

Career NFL statistics
- Tackles: 30
- Passes defended: 5
- Stats at Pro Football Reference

Clarence Eugene Love (born June 16, 1976) is an American former professional football player who was a safety in the National Football League (NFL). Love starred at local Jackson High School and was a member of the Jackson Citizen Patriot's Dream Team. Love played college football for the Toledo Rockets and was selected by the Philadelphia Eagles in the fourth round of the 1998 NFL draft. He played with the Eagles (1998), the Baltimore Ravens (1999–2000), and the Oakland Raiders (2002–2004). Love won Super Bowl XXXV with the Baltimore Ravens. Love graduated in 1993 at Jackson High School.

== College career ==
Love attended University of Toledo, where he played for coach Gary Pinkel's Toledo team from 1994 to 1997.

A cornerback, Love started for three years at Toledo, recording 209 tackles and six interceptions. He won a championship in Toledo (MAC title, 1995).

Love made first-team All-MAC in 1997 and second-team All-MAC in 1996. In 1997, had 71 tackles and three interceptions. In 1996, totaled 48 stops and one pick. Love played in the Blue-Gray All-Star Game after his senior season and was drafted by Philadelphia in the fourth round of the 1998 NFL Draft.
