= 1997 Boston College Eagles football team =

American college football season

1997 Boston College Eagles football
- Conference: Big East Conference
- Record: 4–7 (3–4 Big East)
- Head coach: Tom O'Brien (1st season)
- Offensive coordinator: Jeff Jagodzinski (1st season)
- Offensive scheme: Pro-style
- Defensive coordinator: Tim Rose (1st season)
- Base defense: 4–3
- Captains: Matt Hasselbeck; Erik Storz; Shalom Tolefree
- Home stadium: Alumni Stadium

1997 Big East Conference football standings
	Conf.			Overall
Team	W		L	W		L
No. 21 Syracuse $	6	–	1	9	–	4
Virginia Tech	5	–	2	7	–	5
Pittsburgh	4	–	3	6	–	6
West Virginia	4	–	3	7	–	5
Miami (FL)	3	–	4	5	–	6
Temple	3	–	4	3	–	8
Boston College	3	–	4	4	–	7
Rutgers	0	–	7	0	–	11
$ – Conference champion; Rankings from AP Poll

The 1997 Boston College Eagles football team represented Boston College during the 1997 NCAA Division I-A football season. Boston College was a member of the Big East Conference. The Eagles played their home games at Alumni Stadium in Chestnut Hill, Massachusetts, which has been their home stadium since 1957.

== Schedule ==
Date	Time	Opponent	Site	TV	Result	Attendance	Source
September 6	12:00 p.m.	at Temple	Veterans Stadium; Philadelphia, PA	ESPN Plus	L 21–28	5,085	
September 13	12:00 p.m.	West Virginia	Alumni Stadium; Chestnut Hill, MA	ESPN	W 31–24	39,200	
September 20	12:00 p.m.	at Rutgers	Rutgers Stadium; Piscataway, NJ	ESPN Plus	W 35–21	21,117	
September 27	6:00 p.m.	Cincinnati*	Alumni Stadium; Chestnut Hill, MA	ESPN2	L 6–24	40,564	
October 4	3:30 p.m.	Georgia Tech*	Alumni Stadium; Chestnut Hill, MA	CBS	L 14–42	38,462	
October 11	12:00 p.m.	at No. 23 Virginia Tech	Lane Stadium; Blacksburg, VA (rivalry)	ESPN Plus	L 7–17	47,681	
October 18	12:00 p.m.	Miami (FL)	Alumni Stadium; Chestnut Hill, MA	CBS	L 44–45 ^{2OT}	40,006	
October 25	2:30 p.m.	at Notre Dame*	Notre Dame Stadium; Notre Dame, IN (Holy War)	NBC	L 20–52	80,225	
November 1	12:00 p.m.	Pittsburgh	Alumni Stadium; Chestnut Hill, MA		W 22–21	34,796	
November 8	3:30 p.m.	at No. 22 Syracuse	Carrier Dome; Syracuse, NY	CBS	L 13–20	49,153	
November 22	12:00 p.m.	Army*	Alumni Stadium; Chestnut Hill, MA		W 24–20	13,909	
*Non-conference game; Rankings from AP Poll released prior to the game; All times are in Eastern time

== Roster ==
1997 Boston College Eagles football team roster
Players
Coaches
Offense

Pos.	#	Name	Class
OT	76	Darnell Alford	So
OL	74	Doug Brzezinski	Jr
RB	21	Mike Cloud	Jr
OL	73	Dan Collins	Jr
TE	83	Scott Dragos	Sr
QB	7	Matt Hasselbeck	Sr
OL	63	Damien Woody	So

Defense

Pos.	#	Name	Class
LB	44	Frank Chamberlin	So
DT	95	Chris Hovan	So
DL	88	Adam Newman	So

Special teams

Pos.	#	Name	Class

Head coach

- Tom O'Brien

Coordinators/assistant coaches

Legend

- (C) Team captain
- (S) Suspended
- (I) Ineligible
- Injured
- Redshirt
