= Chris Fontenot =

American football player (born 1974)

No. 85
- Position: Tight end

Personal information
- Born: July 11, 1974 (age 52); Lafayette, Louisiana, U.S.
- Listed height: 6 ft 3 in (1.91 m)
- Listed weight: 250 lb (113 kg)

Career information
- High school: Iota (Iota, Louisiana)
- College: McNeese State
- NFL draft: 1998: undrafted

Career history
- Miami Dolphins (1998)*; Kansas City Chiefs (1998)*; Philadelphia Eagles (1998); Oakland Raiders (2000)*; Dallas Cowboys (2000)*; New England Patriots (2000); Chicago Bears (2000)*; Dallas Cowboys (2000)
- * Offseason or practice squad member only

Career NFL statistics
- Receptions: 8
- Receiving yards: 90
- Stats at Pro Football Reference

Christopher Dwight Fontenot (born July 11, 1974) is an American former professional football player who was a tight end for the Philadelphia Eagles of the National Football League (NFL) in 1998. He played college football for the McNeese State Cowboys.
