= 1998 Dallas Cowboys season =

NFL team season

- Owner: Jerry Jones
- General manager: Jerry Jones
- Head coach: Chan Gailey
- Home stadium: Texas Stadium

Results
- Record: 10–6
- Division place: 1st NFC East
- Playoffs: Lost Wild Card Playoffs (vs. Cardinals) 7–20
- Pro Bowlers: RB Emmitt Smith; OT Larry Allen; OG Nate Newton; CB Deion Sanders; SS Darren Woodson

Uniform
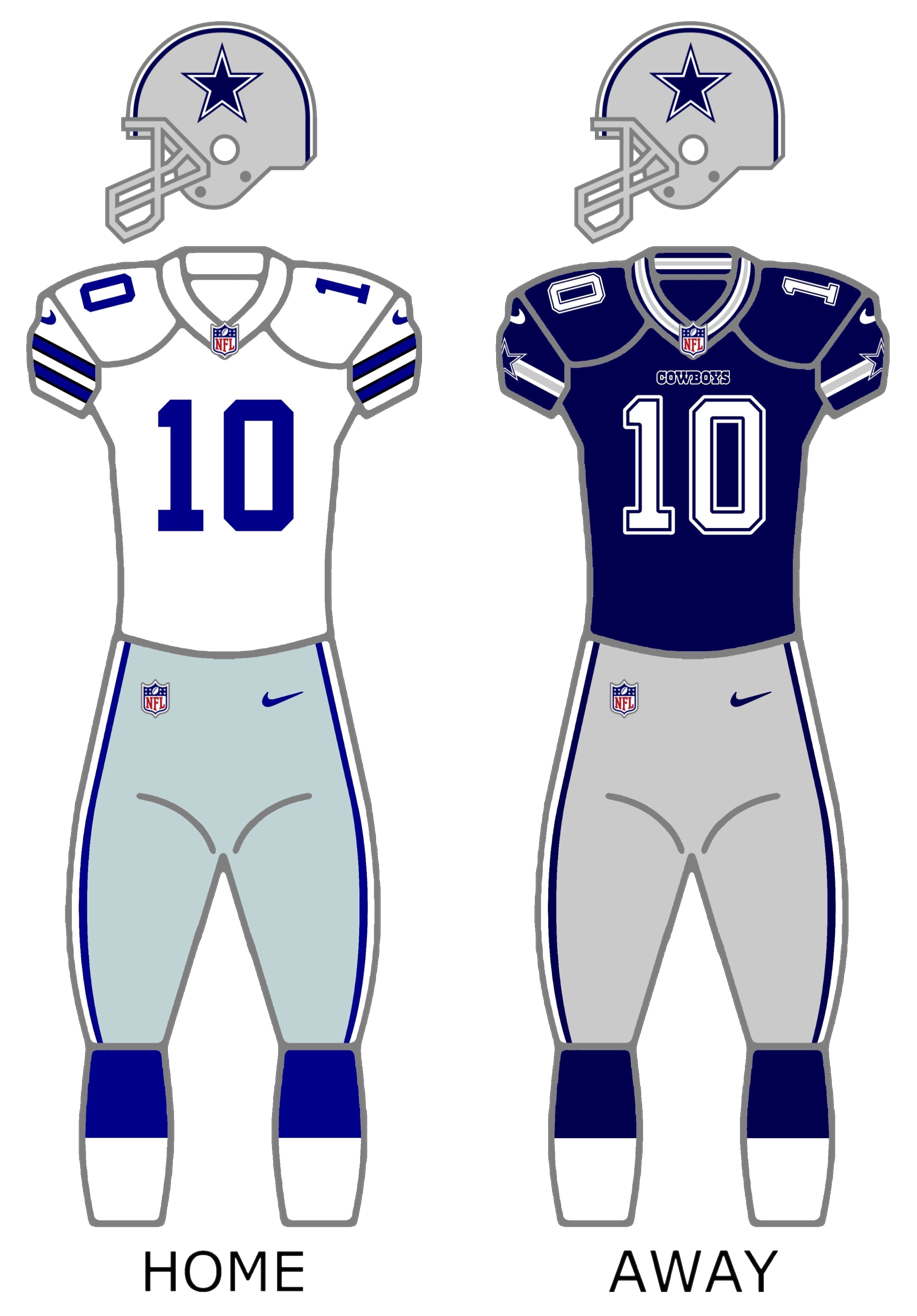

The 1998 Dallas Cowboys season was the Cowboys' 39th season in the National Football League (NFL). The Cowboys were looking to improve on their 6–10 mark from the year before and head to the Super Bowl for the fourth time in the 1990s.

After the previous season, head coach Barry Switzer resigned after four seasons in which he led the Cowboys to the playoffs three times and won Super Bowl XXX. Chan Gailey, who had been offensive coordinator with the Pittsburgh Steelers, was hired as his replacement.

The Cowboys did manage to record a 10–6 record and once again win the NFC East as they had done in the five seasons prior to 1997. However, the Cowboys did not advance beyond the Wild Card round as they were upset by the Arizona Cardinals, who had not won a playoff game since 1947, when the franchise was based in Chicago. The Cowboys would not win another NFC East title until 2007.

== Offseason ==
| Additions | Subtractions |
|---|---|
| RB Chris Warren (Seahawks) | QB Wade Wilson (Raiders) |
| SS George Teague (Dolphins) | FS Brock Marion (Dolphins) |
| G Everett McIver (Dolphins) | C John Flannery (Rams) |
| | LB Vinson Smith (Saints) |
| | SS Bill Bates (Retired) |
| | T Mark Tuinei (Retired) |
| | DE Tony Tolbert (Retired) |
| | RB Herschel Walker (Retired) |

=== NFL draft ===
1998 Dallas Cowboys draft
| Round | Pick | Player | Position | College | Notes |
| 1 | 8 | Greg Ellis * | Defensive end | North Carolina | |
| 2 | 38 | Flozell Adams * | Offensive tackle | Michigan State | |
| 4 | 100 | Michael Myers | Defensive tackle | Alabama | |
| 5 | 130 | Darren Hambrick | Linebacker | South Carolina | |
| 5 | 138 | Oliver Ross | Tackle | Iowa State | from Seattle |
| 6 | 188 | Izell Reese | Safety | UAB | |
| 7 | 223 | Tarik Smith | Running back | California | |
| 7 | 227 | Antonio Fleming | Guard | Georgia | |
| 7 | 237 | Rod Monroe | Tight end | Cincinnati | |
Made roster * Made at least one Pro Bowl during career

=== Undrafted free agents ===
1998 undrafted free agents of note
| Player | Position | College |
|---|---|---|
| Ronald Bailey | Cornerback | Georgia |
| Kent Booth | Guard | Northern Illinois |
| Barry Cantrell | Punter | Fordham |
| Chike Egbuniwe | Linebacker | Duke |
| Cory Geason | Tight end | Tulane |

== Roster ==
Dallas Cowboys 1998 roster
| Quarterbacks: 8 Troy Aikman; 17 Jason Garrett; 11 Mike Quinn; Running backs: 48 Daryl Johnston FB; 22 Emmitt Smith; 45 Nicky Sualua FB; 42 Chris Warren KR; 20 Sherman Williams; Wide receivers: 87 Billy Davis; 88 Michael Irvin; 81 Patrick Jeffers; 82 Jeff Ogden; Tight ends: 86 Eric Bjornson; 83 Hayward Clay; 89 David LaFleur | Offensive linemen: 76 Flozell Adams G; 73 Larry Allen T; 66 Tony Hutson G/T; 63 Mike Kiselak C; 61 Nate Newton G; 68 Oliver Ross G/T; 50 Clay Shiver C; 79 Erik Williams T; Defensive linemen: 96 Antonio Anderson DE; 72 Nathan Davis DT; 98 Greg Ellis DE; 95 Chad Hennings DT; 78 Leon Lett DT; 99 Hurvin McCormack DE/DT; 94 Michael Myers DE/DT; 97 Kavika Pittman DE; 93 Artie Smith DE/DT | Linebackers: 52 Dexter Coakley OLB; 56 Randall Godfrey OLB; 54 Darren Hambrick OLB; 55 Fred Strickland MLB; 59 Robert Thomas MLB; 53 Brandon Tolbert OLB; Defensive backs: 34 Larry Brown CB; 32 Tyrone Hughes CB/KR/PR; 23 Kevin Mathis CB/KR; 27 Singor Mobley SS; 43 Izell Reese FS; 21 Deion Sanders CB/PR; 26 Kevin Smith CB; 24 Omar Stoutmire FS; 31 George Teague SS; 30 Kenny Wheaton CB; 25 Charlie Williams CB/S; 28 Darren Woodson FS/SS; Special teams: 3 Richie Cunningham K; 4 Toby Gowin P; 70 Dale Hellestrae LS | Reserve lists: 91 Darren Benson DT (IR); 35 Wendell Davis CB (IR); 58 Nate Hemsley LB (IR); 67 Everett McIver G (IR); 85 Ernie Mills WR (IR); -- Beau Morgan RB (Military); 51 Broderick Thomas LB (IR); Practice squad: 29 Terry Billups CB; 60 Denny Fortney DE; 38 Zebbie Lethridge CB; 57 Myron Smith LB; 36 Tarik Smith RB; Rookies in italics 53 active, 7 inactive, 5 practice squad |

== Regular season ==
Gailey would revitalize the Cowboys offense, particularly the running game, which had seen a recent decline despite the presence of running back Emmitt Smith. The trio of Smith, Troy Aikman, and Michael Irvin helped the Cowboys be the first ever NFC East team to sweep their division en route to capturing the NFC East title, the team's sixth of the 90's. The Cowboys would later encounter the Arizona Cardinals for the third time that season in the NFC Wild Card Game, but would lose in a stunning upset in the first round at Texas Stadium. Cornerback Deion Sanders suffered an injury to his toe in a regular season victory over Arizona and made a surprise return against them in the playoff loss.

Aikman was injured in a week two loss at Denver and missed the next five games. Future Cowboys Head Coach Jason Garrett started all games during Aikman's absence and went 3–2 as the starting quarterback.

Notable additions to the team that year include defensive end Greg Ellis and offensive tackle Flozell Adams. Ellis was drafted with the 8th pick in the first round. Many were stunned that the Cowboys didn't draft Randy Moss (most likely for his off-the-field issues).

=== Schedule ===
| Week | Date | Opponent | Result | Record | Venue | Attendance |
|---|---|---|---|---|---|---|
| 1 | September 6 | **Arizona Cardinals** | **W** 38–10 | 1–0 | Texas Stadium | 63,602 |
| 2 | September 13 | at Denver Broncos | **L** 23–42 | 1–1 | Mile High Stadium | 75,013 |
| 3 | September 21 | at **New York Giants** | **W** 31–7 | 2–1 | Giants Stadium | 78,039 |
| 4 | September 27 | Oakland Raiders | **L** 12–13 | 2–2 | Texas Stadium | 63,544 |
| 5 | October 4 | at **Washington Redskins** | **W** 31–10 | 3–2 | Jack Kent Cooke Stadium | 72,284 |
| 6 | October 11 | Carolina Panthers | **W** 27–20 | 4–2 | Texas Stadium | 64,181 |
| 7 | October 18 | at Chicago Bears | **L** 12–13 | 4–3 | Soldier Field | 59,201 |
| 8 | Bye | | | | | |
| 9 | November 2 | at **Philadelphia Eagles** | **W** 34–0 | 5–3 | Veterans Stadium | 67,002 |
| 10 | November 8 | **New York Giants** | **W** 16–6 | 6–3 | Texas Stadium | 64,316 |
| 11 | November 15 | at **Arizona Cardinals** | **W** 35–28 | 7–3 | Sun Devil Stadium | 71,670 |
| 12 | November 22 | Seattle Seahawks | **W** 30–22 | 8–3 | Texas Stadium | 64,142 |
| 13 | November 26 | Minnesota Vikings | **L** 36–46 | 8–4 | Texas Stadium | 64,366 |
| 14 | December 6 | at New Orleans Saints | **L** 3–22 | 8–5 | Louisiana Superdome | 65,065 |
| 15 | December 13 | at Kansas City Chiefs | **L** 17–20 | 8–6 | Arrowhead Stadium | 77,697 |
| 16 | December 20 | **Philadelphia Eagles** | **W** 13–9 | 9–6 | Texas Stadium | 62,722 |
| 17 | December 27 | **Washington Redskins** | **W** 23–7 | 10–6 | Texas Stadium | 63,565 |

Note: Intra-division opponents are in bold text.

=== Standings ===
NFC East
| | W | L | T | PCT | PF | PA | STK |
|---|---|---|---|---|---|---|---|
| ^{(3)} Dallas Cowboys | 10 | 6 | 0 | .625 | 381 | 275 | W2 |
| ^{(6)} Arizona Cardinals | 9 | 7 | 0 | .563 | 325 | 378 | W3 |
| New York Giants | 8 | 8 | 0 | .500 | 287 | 309 | W4 |
| Washington Redskins | 6 | 10 | 0 | .375 | 319 | 421 | L1 |
| Philadelphia Eagles | 3 | 13 | 0 | .188 | 161 | 344 | L3 |

== Playoffs ==
| Round | Date | Opponent (seed) | Result | Record | Venue | TV |
|---|---|---|---|---|---|---|
| Wild Card | January 2, 1999 | Arizona Cardinals (6) | L 20–7 | 0–1 | Texas Stadium | ABC |

== Publications ==
- The Football Encyclopedia ISBN 0-312-11435-4
- Total Football ISBN 0-06-270170-3
- Cowboys Have Always Been My Heroes ISBN 0-446-51950-2
