= 1997 West Virginia Mountaineers football team =

American college football season

1997 West Virginia Mountaineers football

Carquest Bowl, L 30–35 vs. Georgia Tech
- Conference: Big East Conference
- Record: 7–5 (4–3 Big East)
- Head coach: Don Nehlen (18th season)
- Offensive coordinator: Dan Simrell (3rd season)
- Defensive coordinator: Steve Dunlap (6th season)
- Home stadium: Mountaineer Field

1997 Big East Conference football standings
	Conf.			Overall
Team	W		L	W		L
No. 21 Syracuse $	6	–	1	9	–	4
Virginia Tech	5	–	2	7	–	5
Pittsburgh	4	–	3	6	–	6
West Virginia	4	–	3	7	–	5
Miami (FL)	3	–	4	5	–	6
Temple	3	–	4	3	–	8
Boston College	3	–	4	4	–	7
Rutgers	0	–	7	0	–	11
$ – Conference champion; Rankings from AP Poll

The 1997 West Virginia Mountaineers football team represented West Virginia University as a member of the Big East Conference during the 1997 NCAA Division I-A football season. Led by 18th-year head coach Don Nehlen, the Mountaineers compiled an overall record of 7–5 with a mark of 4–3 in conference play, tying for third place in the Big East. West Virginia was invited to the Carquest Bowl, where the Mountaineers lost to Georgia Tech. The team played home games at Mountaineer Field in Morgantown, West Virginia.

== Schedule ==
Date	Time	Opponent	Rank	Site	TV	Result	Attendance	Source
August 30	12:00 p.m.	Marshall*		Mountaineer Field; Morgantown, WV (Friends of Coal Bowl)	ESPN Plus	W 42–31	65,492	
September 6	12:30 p.m.	East Carolina*		Mountaineer Field; Morgantown, WV	ESPN	W 24–17	51,143	
September 13	12:00 p.m.	at Boston College		Alumni Stadium; Chestnut Hill, MA	ESPN	L 24–31	39,200	
September 27	3:30 p.m.	at Miami (FL)		Miami Orange Bowl; Miami, FL	CBS	W 28–17	39,270	
October 4	12:00 p.m.	Rutgers		Mountaineer Field; Morgantown, WV	ESPN Plus	W 48–0	51,737	
October 11	1:00 p.m.	at Maryland*		Byrd Stadium; College Park, MD (rivalry)		W 31–14	31,210	
October 25	3:30 p.m.	No. 19 Virginia Tech	No. 21	Mountaineer Field; Morgantown, WV (rivalry)	CBS	W 30–17	63,649	
November 1	7:30 p.m.	at Syracuse	No. 17	Carrier Dome; Syracuse, NY (rivalry)	ESPN	L 10–40	49,273	
November 15	1:00 p.m.	Temple		Mountaineer Field; Morgantown, WV		W 41–21	37,061	
November 22	2:30 p.m.	at Notre Dame*	No. 22	Notre Dame Stadium; Notre Dame, IN	NBC	L 14–21	80,225	
November 28	2:30 p.m.	Pittsburgh		Mountaineer Field; Morgantown, WV (Backyard Brawl)	CBS	L 38–41 ^{3OT}	48,044	
December 29	7:30 p.m.	vs. Georgia Tech*		Pro Player Stadium; Miami Gardens, FL (Carquest Bowl)	TBS	L 30–35	28,262	
*Non-conference game; Rankings from AP Poll released prior to the game; All times are in Eastern time

== Rankings ==
Ranking movements Legend: ██ Increase in ranking ██ Decrease in ranking — = Not ranked
	Week																	
Poll	Pre	1	2	3	4	5	6	7	8	9	10	11	12	13	14	15	16	Final
AP	—	—	—	—	—	—	—	—	23	21	17	—	—	22	—	—	—	—
Coaches	—		—	24	—	—	—	24	22	20	17	22	23	21	—	—	—	—

== Game summaries ==
=== Marshall ===
Team	1	2	3	4	Total
Thundering Herd	3	7	21	0	31
• Mountaineers	21	7	0	14	42

- Date: August 30
- Location: Mountaineer Field
  Morgantown, WV
- Game start: 12:00 p.m. EST
- Game attendance: 65,492
- Game weather: 70 °F (21 °C), Partly Cloudy and Mild, Wind NW 4 mph (6.4 km/h)
- Referee: Jim Maconaghy
- TV announcers (ESPN Plus): John Sanders and Jeff Bostic

Scoring summary
1	12:30	WVU	Gary Thompkins 7-yard blocked punt return (Jay Taylor kick)	WVU 7–0
1	6:04	WVU	Amos Zereoué 10-yard run (Jay Taylor kick)	WVU 14–0
1	2:24	MAR	Billy Malashevich 25-yard field goal	WVU 14–3
1	0:02	WVU	Amos Zereoué 52-yard run (Jay Taylor kick)	WVU 21–3
2	10:51	WVU	Curtis Keaton 11-yard run (Jay Taylor kick)	WVU 28–3
2	3:34	MAR	LaVorn Colclough 24-yard pass from Chad Pennington (Billy Malashevich kick)	WVU 28–10
3	13:08	MAR	Randy Moss 15-yard pass from Chad Pennington (Billy Malashevich kick)	WVU 28–17
3	9:24	MAR	Llow Turner 53-yard run (Billy Malashevich kick)	WVU 28–24
3	0:35	MAR	Randy Moss 25-yard pass from Chad Pennington (Billy Malashevich kick)	MAR 31–28
4	11:07	WVU	Chad Wable 15-yard pass from Marc Bulger (Jay Taylor kick)	WVU 35–31
4	7:56	WVU	Amos Zereoué 1-yard run (Jay Taylor kick)	WVU 42–31

== Personnel ==
1997 West Virginia Mountaineers football team roster
Players
Coaches
Offense

Pos.	#	Name	Class
OT	65	Sam Austin
QB	10	Marc Bulger	So
C	67	Eric de Groh	Jr
G	62	Steve Ford	Jr
WR	16	Shawn Foreman	Jr
RB	9	Curtis Keaton
WR	80	James Norton	So
OT	77	Solomon Page	So
G	61	Bryan Pukenas	Jr
TE	87	Chad Wable	Sr
FB	34	Leroy White	Sr
RB	20	Amos Zereoué	So

Defense

Pos.	#	Name	Class
CB	3	Perlo Bastien	So
DE	45	Bob Baum
LB	1	Damon Cogdell
SS	33	Barrett Green	So
LB	52	John Hadley	Sr
LB	50	Steve Lippe	Sr
DT	78	Henry Slay	Sr
DE	55	Gary Stills	Jr
CB	28	Nate Terry
FS	11	Gary Thompkins	So
NT	96	John Thornton	Jr

Special teams

Pos.	#	Name	Class
P	7	Bryan Baumann	Sr
K	47	Jay Taylor	So

Head coach

- Don Nehlen

Coordinators/assistant coaches

Legend

- (C) Team captain
- (S) Suspended
- (I) Ineligible
- Injured
- Redshirt
