= Steve Zahursky =

American football player (born 1976)

No. 72, 75
- Positions: Guard, tackle

Personal information
- Born: September 2, 1976 (age 50); Euclid, Ohio, U.S.
- Listed height: 6 ft 6 in (1.98 m)
- Listed weight: 305 lb (138 kg)

Career information
- High school: Euclid (OH)
- College: Kent State
- NFL draft: 1998: undrafted

Career history
- Jacksonville Jaguars (1998)*; Philadelphia Eagles (1998)*; Cleveland Browns (1999–2000); Jacksonville Jaguars (2001)
- * Offseason or practice squad member only

Awards and highlights
- First-team All-MAC (1997)

Career NFL statistics
- Games played: 26
- Games started: 23
- Fumble recoveries: 3
- Stats at Pro Football Reference

Stephen John Zahursky (born September 2, 1976, in Euclid, Ohio) is a retired professional American football player and police officer. He played offensive lineman for three seasons for the Cleveland Browns (1999–2000) and the Jacksonville Jaguars (2001).

== Later life ==
After his playing career, Zahursky became a police officer, working in North Royalton, Ohio, and was considered Cuyahoga County's "top OVI cop". In 2019, Zahursky was charged with felony perjury, tampering with evidence, and falsification, relating to an April 2018 OVI arrest where Zahursky's claims in court of a man's intoxication were shown to be false. Felony charges were dropped in November 2019 when Zahursky took a plea deal and pleaded guilty to a misdemeanor charge of obstructing official business; he was sentenced one year probation, ordered to pay a $50 fine, and recommended to return to his job as a police officer on restricted duty for one year.
