= 1997 Miami Hurricanes football team =

American college football season

1997 Miami Hurricanes football
- Conference: Big East Conference
- Record: 5–6 (3–4 Big East)
- Head coach: Butch Davis (3rd season)
- Offensive coordinator: Larry Coker (3rd season)
- Offensive scheme: Multiple
- Defensive coordinator: Bill Miller (3rd season)
- Base defense: 4–3
- MVP: Edgerrin James
- Home stadium: Miami Orange Bowl

1997 Big East Conference football standings
	Conf.			Overall
Team	W		L	W		L
No. 21 Syracuse $	6	–	1	9	–	4
Virginia Tech	5	–	2	7	–	5
Pittsburgh	4	–	3	6	–	6
West Virginia	4	–	3	7	–	5
Miami (FL)	3	–	4	5	–	6
Temple	3	–	4	3	–	8
Boston College	3	–	4	4	–	7
Rutgers	0	–	7	0	–	11
$ – Conference champion; Rankings from AP Poll

The 1997 Miami Hurricanes football team represented the University of Miami as a member of the Big East Conference during the 1997 NCAA Division I-A football season. Led by third-year head coach Butch Davis, the Hurricanes compiled an overall record of 5–6 with a mark of 3–4 in conference play, placing a in three-way tie for fifth in the Big East. This was Miami’s first losing season since 1979. The team played home games at the Miami Orange Bowl in Miami.

== Schedule ==
Date	Time	Opponent	Rank	Site	TV	Result	Attendance	Source
August 30	3:30 pm	at Baylor*	No. 14	Floyd Casey Stadium; Waco, TX	ABC	W 45–14	36,750	
September 13	3:30 pm	No. 24 Arizona State*	No. 13	Miami Orange Bowl; Miami, FL	CBS	L 12–23	42,219	
September 18	8:00 pm	at Pittsburgh	No. 22	Pitt Stadium; Pittsburgh, PA	ESPN	L 17–21	40,194	
September 27	3:30 pm	West Virginia		Miami Orange Bowl; Miami, FL	CBS	L 17–28	39,270	
October 4	3:30 pm	at No. 4 Florida State*		Doak Campbell Stadium; Tallahassee, FL (rivalry)	ABC	L 0–47	80,165	
October 18	12:00 pm	at Boston College		Alumni Stadium; Chestnut Hill, MA	CBS	W 45–44 ^{2OT}	40,006	
October 25	12:00 pm	Temple		Miami Orange Bowl; Miami, FL	ESPN Plus	W 47–15	26,351	
November 1	4:00 pm	Arkansas State*		Miami Orange Bowl; Miami, FL		W 42–10	20,559	
November 8	6:00 pm	at No. 20 Virginia Tech		Lane Stadium; Blacksburg, VA (rivalry)	ESPN2	L 25–27	53,177	
November 15	12:00 pm	Rutgers^{†}		Miami Orange Bowl; Miami, FL	ESPN Plus	W 51–23	19,949	
November 29	3:30 pm	No. 16 Syracuse		Miami Orange Bowl; Miami, FL	CBS	L 13–33	25,147	
*Non-conference game; ^{†}Homecoming; Rankings from AP Poll released prior to the game; All times are in Eastern time

== Rankings ==
Ranking movements Legend: ██ Increase in ranking ██ Decrease in ranking — = Not ranked
	Week																	
Poll	Pre	1	2	3	4	5	6	7	8	9	10	11	12	13	14	15	16	Final
AP	13	14	13	13	22	—	—	—	—	—	—	—	—	—	—	—	—	—
Coaches	14		12	12	21	—	—	—	—	—	—	—	—	—	—	—	—	—
