= 1997 Virginia Tech Hokies football team =

American college football season

1997 Virginia Tech Hokies football

Gator Bowl, L 3–42 vs. North Carolina
- Conference: Big East Conference
- Record: 7–5 (5–2 Big East)
- Head coach: Frank Beamer (11th season)
- Offensive coordinator: Rickey Bustle (4th season)
- Offensive scheme: Multiple
- Defensive coordinator: Bud Foster (3rd season)
- Base defense: 4–4
- Home stadium: Lane Stadium

1997 Big East Conference football standings
	Conf.			Overall
Team	W		L	W		L
No. 21 Syracuse $	6	–	1	9	–	4
Virginia Tech	5	–	2	7	–	5
Pittsburgh	4	–	3	6	–	6
West Virginia	4	–	3	7	–	5
Miami (FL)	3	–	4	5	–	6
Temple	3	–	4	3	–	8
Boston College	3	–	4	4	–	7
Rutgers	0	–	7	0	–	11
$ – Conference champion; Rankings from AP Poll

The 1997 Virginia Tech Hokies football team represented the Virginia Tech as a member of the Big East Conference during the 1997 NCAA Division I-A football season. Led by 11th-year head coach Frank Beamer, the Hokies compiled an overall record of 7–5 with a mark of 5–2 in conference play, placing second in the Big East. Virginia Tech was invited to the Gator Bowl, where the Hokies lost to North Carolina. The team played home games at Lane Stadium in Blacksburg, Virginia.

== Schedule ==
Date	Time	Opponent	Rank	Site	TV	Result	Attendance	Source
August 30	12:30 p.m.	at Rutgers		Rutgers Stadium; Piscataway, NJ	ESPN	W 59–19	26,713	
September 13	6:00 p.m.	Syracuse	No. 22	Lane Stadium; Blacksburg, VA	ESPN	W 31–3	50,137	
September 20	6:00 p.m.	at Temple	No. 18	Veterans Stadium; Philadelphia, PA		W 23–13	12,056	
September 27	1:00 p.m.	Arkansas State*	No. 14	Lane Stadium; Blacksburg, VA		W 50–0	42,178	
October 4	1:00 p.m.	Miami (OH)*^{†}	No. 14	Lane Stadium; Blacksburg, VA		L 17–24	42,878	
October 11	12:00 p.m.	Boston College	No. 23	Lane Stadium; Blacksburg, VA (rivalry)	ESPN Plus	W 17–7	47,681	
October 25	3:30 p.m.	at No. 21 West Virginia	No. 19	Mountaineer Field; Morgantown, WV (rivalry)	CBS	L 17–30	63,649	
November 1	1:00 p.m.	UAB*	No. 23	Lane Stadium; Blacksburg, VA		W 37–0	37,411	
November 8	6:00 p.m.	Miami (FL)	No. 20	Lane Stadium; Blacksburg, VA (rivalry)	ESPN2	W 27–25	53,117	
November 22	3:30 p.m.	at Pittsburgh	No. 19	Pitt Stadium; Pittsburgh, PA		L 23–30	30,144	
November 29	5:30 p.m.	at Virginia*		Scott Stadium; Charlottesville, VA (rivalry)	ESPN	L 20–34	44,200	
January 1, 1998	12:30 p.m.	vs. No. 7 North Carolina*		Alltel Stadium; Jacksonville, FL (Gator Bowl)	NBC	L 3–42	54,116	
*Non-conference game; ^{†}Homecoming; Rankings from AP Poll released prior to the game; All times are in Eastern time

== Rankings ==
Ranking movements Legend: ██ Increase in ranking ██ Decrease in ranking — = Not ranked
	Week																	
Poll	Pre	1	2	3	4	5	6	7	8	9	10	11	12	13	14	15	16	Final
AP	—	—	—	22	18	14	14	23	22	19	23	20	19	19	—	—	—	—
Coaches Poll	25		22	19	14	12	12	21	19	17	22	18	17	15	21	—	—	—

== Roster ==
1997 Virginia Tech Hokies football team roster
Players
Coaches
Offense

Pos.	#	Name	Class
TB	4	Andre Kendrick	RFr
QB	5	Al Clark	RJr
TB	7	Lamont Pegues	RJr
QB	13	Dave Meyer	RFr
QB	14	Nick Sorensen	RFr
FL	15	Marcus Gildersleeve	RFr
QB	18	Mike Kocicka	RJr
SE	19	Greg Shockley	RSo
FL	22	Shawn Scales	RSr
SE	23	Andre Davis	Fr
RB	28	Ken Oxendine	Sr
SE	31	Michael Stuewe	RSr
FB	34	Marcus Parker	Sr
FB	36	Chris Steadley	Fr
RB	38	Shyrone Stith	So
FB	42	Cullen Hawkins	So
FB	44	Shelly Ellison	RSo
FL	48	Ken Handy	Jr
C	52	Keith Short	RSo
G	57	Dwight Vick	RJr
C	62	Tim Schnecker	So
G	64	Gennaro DiNapoli	Sr
OT	65	Ryan Baird	So
OT	67	Brad Baylor	Sr
G	69	Matt Lehr	Fr
G	70	Troy Smith	Fr
OT	74	Derek Smith	RJr
C	75	Todd Washington	Sr
OT	76	Dave Kadela	Fr
OT	79	Josh Redding	RFr
TE	80	Greg Myers	RFr
SE	81	Brain Remley	RFr
SE	82	Ricky Hall	Jr
FL	83	Angelo Harrison	Jr
TE	85	Derek Carter	Fr
TE	86	James Lomax	Fr
TE	88	Sean Sullivan	RSr
TE	89	Robert Adams	So

Defense

Pos.	#	Name	Class
FS	1	Keion Carpenter	Jr
LB	2	Tyron Edmond	Jr
CB	3	Ike Charlton	RFr
FS	6	Lorenzo Ferguson	RFr
ROV	8	Phillip Summers	RFr
CB	9	Anthony Midget	So
CB	11	Larry Green	RSr
CB	12	Loren Johnson	Jr
LB	16	Cory Bird	RFr
CB	20	Pierson Prioleau	Jr
LB	21	Manny Clemente	RFr
CB	24	Tony Joe	Sr
LB	26	Korey Irby	RSr
FS	33	Steven Hunt	So
LB	37	Jaime Forrest	RFr
LB	40	Sean Ruffing	RFr
LB	43	Michael Hawkes	RSo
LB	46	Jamel Smith	RSo
DE	47	Ryan Smith	RJr
LB	49	Steve Tate	RSr
DE	53	Jason Buckland	RSo
DE	56	Corey Moore	RSo
DT	59	Anthony Lambo	RFr
DT	66	Chad Beasley	Fr
DT	71	David Pugh	Fr
DT	77	Carl Bradley	So
DE	90	Danny Wheel	RSr
DT	92	Nat Williams	RSo
DT	93	Kerwin Hairston	RSr
DE	96	John Engelberger	So
DE	99	Chris Cyrus	RSo

Special teams

Pos.	#	Name	Class
K	17	Shayne Graham	So
LS	25	Shane Beamer	RSo
LS	68	Cliff Anders	So
H	91	Caleb Hurd	So
LS	95	Jimmy Kibble	RSo

Head coach

- Frank Beamer

Coordinators/assistant coaches

- Bud Foster (defensive coordinator)
- Rickey Bustle (offensive coordinator)
- J. C. Price (strength and conditioning)
- Brent Pry (graduate assistant)

Legend

- (C) Team captain
- (S) Suspended
- (I) Ineligible
- Injured
- Redshirt

Roster
Last update: 2026-09-30 (archived 1998-02-06)
