= Donovin Darius =

American football player (born 1975)

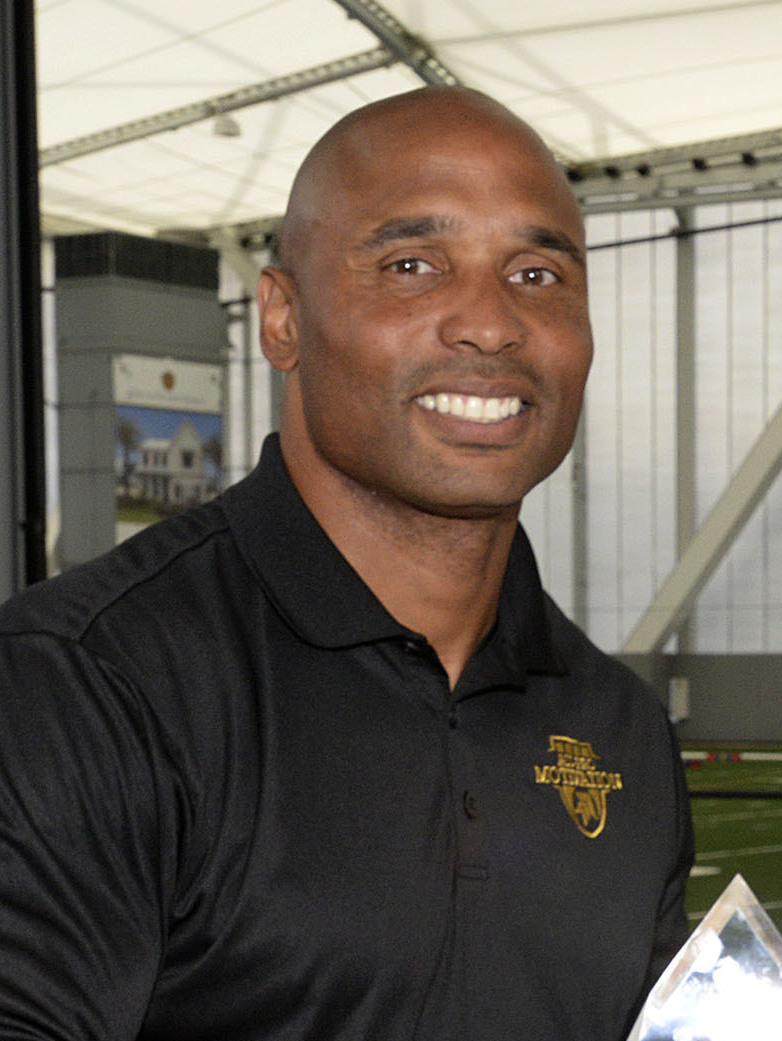
- Darius in 2018

No. 20, 40
- Position: Safety

Personal information
- Born: August 12, 1975 (age 51); Camden, New Jersey, U.S.
- Listed height: 6 ft 1 in (1.85 m)
- Listed weight: 225 lb (102 kg)

Career information
- High school: Woodrow Wilson (Camden)
- College: Syracuse
- NFL draft: 1998: 1st round, 25th overall pick

Career history
- Jacksonville Jaguars (1998–2006); Oakland Raiders (2007)*; Miami Dolphins (2007)
- * Offseason or practice squad member only

Awards and highlights
- PFWA All-Rookie Team (1998); First-team All-American (1997); Big East Defensive Player of the Year (1997); 2× All-Big East (1995–1996)

Career NFL statistics
- Tackles: 631
- Sacks: 2
- Forced fumbles: 7
- Fumble recoveries: 6
- Passes defended: 46
- Interceptions: 14
- Defensive touchdowns: 1
- Stats at Pro Football Reference

Donovin Lee Darius (born August 12, 1975) is an American former professional football player who was a safety in the National Football League (NFL). He was selected by the Jacksonville Jaguars 25th overall in the 1998 NFL draft, and played for nine seasons with the team. He played for the Miami Dolphins in 2007. He played college football at Syracuse.

== College career ==
Darius played for two years at Highland Regional High School in Blackwood, New Jersey, before transferring for the start of his junior year. Darius is a graduate of Woodrow Wilson High School in Camden, New Jersey.

Darius played at Syracuse University, setting the team record for tackles by a defensive back with 379. He was a Big East All-Conference player in 1995 and 1996, and also lettered in indoor and outdoor hurdles, graduating in 1997 with a degree in exercise science and a minor in coaching.

== Professional career ==
Darius was selected in the first round with the 25th overall pickin the 1998 NFL draft by the Jacksonville Jaguars, then the highest pick ever by the team for a defensive back. He was the sixth defensive back selected, behind Tebucky Jones, Duane Starks, and others. He was named to the All-Rookie team and led Jaguar defensive backs with 108 tackles in 14 games. In 1999, he switched to strong safety and continued to sharpen his skills as a defensive force.

In 2004, Darius led the secondary in tackles for a seventh straight season and posted career highs in forced fumbles and interceptions. His season-ending injury in 2005 stopped his consecutive start streak at 37.

In 2004, Darius was ejected and fined $75,000 for an illegal clothesline tackle on Green Bay Packers wide receiver Robert Ferguson. However, Darius later apologized to Ferguson for the incident by calling him at the hospital. Prior to his release, he had been with the Jaguars longer than any other active player along with running back Fred Taylor.

Darius signed a three-year extension on August 29, 2005, which put him under contract through 2008. However, he tore his anterior cruciate ligament during the Jaguars' second game of the 2005 NFL season and was placed on injured reserve.

On November 20, 2006, during a Monday Night Football game against the New York Giants, he broke his leg and missed the rest of the 2006 season.

On December 14, 2006, Darius was released by the Jaguars.

Donovin signed with the Oakland Raiders on January 1, 2007, but was released in the final roster cuts. He was subsequently signed by the Miami Dolphins, but was released again in October.

Darius signed a one-day ceremonial contract with the Jaguars on March 1, 2013, to retire as a member of the team. He currently serves on the NFL Players Association Executive Committee and resides in Jacksonville, Florida, where he earned an MBA from Jacksonville University.

== NFL career statistics ==
Legend
**Bold**	Career high

=== Regular season ===
Year	Team	Games		Tackles				Interceptions				Fumbles			
Year	Team	GP	GS	Comb	Solo	Ast	Sck	Int	Yds	TD	Lng	FF	FR	Yds	TD
1998	JAX	14	14	74	58	16	0.0	0	0	0	0	**2**	1	**83**	**1**
1999	JAX	16	16	78	60	18	0.0	4	37	0	29	0	0	0	0
2000	JAX	16	16	85	65	20	**1.0**	2	26	0	21	1	0	0	0
2001	JAX	11	11	77	65	12	0.0	1	39	0	**39**	0	0	0	0
2002	JAX	14	14	78	**70**	8	**1.0**	1	3	0	3	0	0	0	0
2003	JAX	16	16	83	56	27	0.0	1	4	0	4	**2**	1	0	0
2004	JAX	16	16	**89**	61	**28**	0.0	**5**	**80**	0	37	**2**	**4**	0	0
2005	JAX	2	2	6	5	1	0.0	0	0	0	0	0	0	0	0
2006	JAX	10	10	48	39	9	0.0	0	0	0	0	0	0	0	0
2007	MIA	3	2	13	13	0	0.0	0	0	0	0	0	0	0	0
		118	117	631	492	139	2.0	14	189	0	39	7	6	83	1

=== Postseason ===
Year	Team	Games		Tackles				Interceptions				Fumbles			
Year	Team	GP	GS	Comb	Solo	Ast	Sck	Int	Yds	TD	Lng	FF	FR	Yds	TD
1998	JAX	2	2	**13**	**11**	**2**	0.0	**1**	**1**	0	**1**	0	0	0	0
1999	JAX	2	2	9	7	**2**	0.0	0	0	0	0	0	**2**	**16**	0
		4	4	22	18	4	0.0	1	1	0	1	0	2	16	0

== Personal life ==
When Darius was a junior in college, he obtained legal guardianship of two younger brothers. He had them move from Camden, NJ to Syracuse, NY and he looked after them while also attending college and playing football. According to the Jacksonville Sheriff's Office, Darius was arrested and charged with DUI after crashing his car on the morning of January 26, 2020. He was subsequently transported to a Jacksonville area hospital for a mental health evaluation after telling rescue workers he had ingested 20 to 30 pills and that he was suicidal.
