= Antwaune Ponds =

American football player (born 1975)

No. 51
- Position: Linebacker

Personal information
- Born: June 29, 1975 (age 51); Harrisburg, Pennsylvania, U.S.
- Listed height: 6 ft 2 in (1.88 m)
- Listed weight: 252 lb (114 kg)

Career information
- High school: Jacksonville (FL) Paxon
- College: Syracuse
- NFL draft: 1998: 7th round, 206th overall pick

Career history
- Washington Redskins (1998)

Awards and highlights
- Third-team All-American (1996)
- Stats at Pro Football Reference

Antwaune Ponds (born June 29, 1975) is an American former professional football player who was a linebacker for the Washington Redskins of the National Football League (NFL). He played college football for the Syracuse Orange and was selected in the seventh round of the 1998 NFL draft with the 206th overall pick. He played in three games in the 1998 season.
