= Henry Slay =

American football player (born 1975)

No. 70, 95, 91, 93
- Position: Defensive tackle

Personal information
- Born: April 28, 1975 (age 51); Cleveland, Ohio, U.S.
- Listed height: 6 ft 2 in (1.88 m)
- Listed weight: 290 lb (132 kg)

Career information
- High school: Elyria West (Elyria, Ohio)
- College: West Virginia
- NFL draft: 1998: 7th round, 203rd overall pick

Career history
- Atlanta Falcons (1998)*; Philadelphia Eagles (1998); Berlin Thunder (1999-2000); Tennessee Titans (2000)*; New Jersey Red Dogs (2000); New York/New Jersey Hitmen (2001)
- * Offseason or practice squad member only

Awards and highlights
- Third-team All-American (1997)

Career NFL statistics
- Games played: 3
- Stats at Pro Football Reference

Career AFL statistics
- Tackles: 1
- Stats at ArenaFan.com

Henry Slay (born April 28, 1975) is an American former professional football player who was a defensive lineman in the National Football League (NFL). He played college football for the West Virginia Mountaineers. Slay was selected by the Atlanta Falcons in the seventh round of the 1998 NFL draft with the 203rd overall pick. He played three games for the Philadelphia Eagles, before continuing his professional career in other leagues.
