= Kaseem Sinceno =

American football player (born 1976)

No. 89, 85
- Position: Tight end

Personal information
- Born: March 26, 1976 (age 50); New York City, New York, U.S.
- Listed height: 6 ft 4 in (1.93 m)
- Listed weight: 259 lb (117 kg)

Career information
- High school: Liberty (Liberty, New York)
- College: Syracuse (1994–1997)
- NFL draft: 1998: undrafted

Career history
- Philadelphia Eagles (1998–1999); Green Bay Packers (2000); Chicago Bears (2000–2001); Houston Texas (2002)*
- * Offseason or practice squad member only

Career NFL statistics
- Receptions: 26
- Receiving yards: 248
- Receiving touchdowns: 1
- Stats at Pro Football Reference

Kaseem Tyrone Sinceno (born March 26, 1976) is an American former professional football player who was a tight end for four seasons in the National Football League (NFL) with the Philadelphia Eagles and Chicago Bears. He played college football for the Syracuse Orange.

== Early life and college ==
Kaseem Tyrone Sinceno was born on March 26, 1976, in New York City. He attended Liberty High School in Liberty, New York.

Sinceno was a four-year letterman for the Syracuse Orange of Syracuse University from 1994 to 1997. He caught six passes for 52 yards and one touchdown in 1995, ten passes for 98 yards and three touchdowns in 1996, and six passes for 61 yards and three touchdowns in 1997.

== Professional career ==
After going undrafted in the 1998 NFL draft, Sinceno signed with the Philadelphia Eagles on April 27, 1998. He was released on August 30, signed to the practice squad on September 1, and promoted to the active roster on September 16. He then played in ten games for the Eagles during the 1998 season, recording three receptions for 42 yards and one touchdown on eight targets, before being placed on injured reserve on December 1, 1998. Sinceno was placed on injured reserve again on September 6, 1999, and missed the entire 1999 season.

On March 16, 2000, Sinceno was traded to the Green Bay Packers for tight end Jeff Thomason. Sinceno was released on August 27 but re-signed on September 5. He was released by the Packers again on September 22, 2000, before appearing in any games.

Sinceno signed with the Chicago Bears on October 3, 2000. He played in 11 games, all starts, for the Bears in 2000, catching 23 passes for 206 yards on 41 targets. He became a free agent after the season and re-signed with the team on April 25, 2001. Sinceno was placed on injured reserve on August 13, 2001, and missed the entire season.

Sinceno became a free agent after the 2001 season and signed with the Houston Texans on April 9, 2002. He was released on August 31, 2002.
