= 1998 Gator Bowl =

1998 Toyota Gator Bowl
- 53rd Gator Bowl
Virginia Tech Hokies	North Carolina Tar Heels
(7–4)	(10–1)
Big East	ACC
3	42
Head coach: Frank Beamer	Head coach: Carl Torbush (interim)
	AP / Coaches / BA; 7 / 5 / 6
	1	2	3	4	Total
Virginia Tech	0	0	3	0	3
North Carolina	16	6	6	14	42
- Date: January 1, 1998
- Season: 1997
- Stadium: Alltel Stadium
- Location: Jacksonville, Florida
- MVP: QB Chris Keldorf (UNC); QB Nick Sorensen (VT)
- Favorite: North Carolina by 12
- Referee: Mack Gentry (SEC)
- Halftime show: Marching Virginians, Marching Tar Heels, "Salute to the bowl games of America"
- Attendance: 54,116
- Payout: US$3.2 million (total)

United States TV coverage
- Network: NBC
- Announcers: Charlie Jones, Bob Trumpy, John Dockery
- Nielsen ratings: 3.7

The 1998 Gator Bowl was a post-season American college football bowl game between the Virginia Tech Hokies from the Virginia Polytechnic Institute and State University and the North Carolina Tar Heels from the University of North Carolina at Chapel Hill. The 53rd edition of the Gator Bowl, it was played at Alltel Stadium in Jacksonville, Florida, on January 1, 1998. The game was the final contest of the 1997 NCAA Division I-A football season for both teams, and ended in a 42–3 victory for North Carolina.

Virginia Tech was selected to play in the Gator Bowl following a 7–4 regular season. Facing the unranked Hokies were the No. 7-ranked North Carolina Tar Heels. The Heels had gone 10–1 during the regular season and were ranked seventh in the Associated Press poll heading into the game. North Carolina narrowly missed an at-large selection to a higher-prestige Bowl Alliance postseason game and was playing under new head coach Carl Torbush for the first time. Torbush had taken over for former head coach Mack Brown on December 8, after Brown announced that he was departing to take the position of head coach at Texas.

The game kicked off on January 1, 1998, at Alltel Stadium in Jacksonville, Florida. From the opening kickoff, North Carolina dominated every aspect of the game. In the first quarter, the Tar Heels scored 16 unanswered points, including a defensive touchdown. North Carolina added six points in the second and third quarters before Tech scored its first points of the game—a 40-yard field goal by kicker Shayne Graham. The Tar Heels rounded out the game by scoring 14 points in the fourth quarter. The Tar Heels set school records for largest bowl game margin of victory, most points scored in a bowl game, and most touchdown passes in a bowl game. The eventual 42–3 loss was Virginia Tech's largest bowl loss in school history.

Quarterbacks Chris Keldorf and Nick Sorensen were named the most valuable players of their respective teams, and each team saw multiple players selected in the 1998 NFL draft, which followed the game.

== Team selection ==
During the 1997 college football season, the Gator Bowl selection committee held contracts with both the Big East and Atlantic Coast Conferences. In exchange for guaranteeing to pay a total of $3.2 million to the participating teams, the committee held the right to the second pick of bowl-eligible teams from each conference. Each conference's champion was awarded an automatic spot in a Bowl Alliance game, and it was expected that the Gator Bowl would select each conference's second-place team unless other circumstances arose.

Prior to the final week of the regular season, it appeared that circumstances might indeed throw that plan into confusion. North Carolina, the ACC's second-place team, had risen to No. 5 in the USA Today Coaches Poll and No. 7 in the Associated Press college football poll, and was considered to be a candidate for an at-large Bowl Alliance selection. If North Carolina was selected for a higher-tier bowl game, the door would be opened for Notre Dame to play in the 1998 Gator Bowl—a circumstance provided for if neither the first nor second-place ACC team was available to play. In the end, however, ACC runner-up North Carolina was bypassed by Bowl Alliance officials, leaving the team available for the Gator Bowl. Facing the Tar Heels were the Virginia Tech Hokies, second-place finishers in the Big East Conference. Gator Bowl officials considered inviting Big East third-place West Virginia due to its reputation for bringing large numbers of fans to bowl games, but decided against inviting the Mountaineers out of recognition that North Carolina and West Virginia played each other in the 1997 Gator Bowl.

=== Virginia Tech ===
The Virginia Tech Hokies began the 1997 college football season having gone 10–2 the previous season, ending with a 41–21 loss to Nebraska in the 1996 Orange Bowl. The Hokies began the new season with hopes of repeating the success that saw the team reach consecutive Bowl Alliance games in the previous two seasons, but the loss of much of the starting lineup that led the Hokies in those years left some people's skeptical about Tech's chance to reach a third Bowl Alliance game.

In the Hokies' first three games of the season, however, they answered their critics with wins. A season-opening 59–19 win against Rutgers was followed by a 31–3 win over Syracuse and a 23–13 triumph against Temple. A 50–0 shutout win against Arkansas State University saw the Hokies elevated to the No. 14 position in the national college football polls. This, however, was followed by a 24–17 loss to Miami (Ohio) that dropped the Hokies to No. 23. Tech rose again to No. 19 with a victory against Boston College. At No. 21 West Virginia, however, the Hokies lost, 30–17.

The loss returned Tech to No. 23 in the polls. A recovery to No. 19 followed victories over the University of Alabama-Birmingham and the University of Miami. In the final two games of the season, however, The Hokies lost to Pittsburgh, 30–23, and Virginia, 34–20. The dual losses dropped Tech out of the polls for the first time since the opening week of the season, and the Hokies prepared for the Gator Bowl after recording a 7–4 regular-season record.

== Pregame buildup ==
Pregame media coverage of the contest focused on North Carolina's rejection by the Bowl Alliance, the Tar Heels' new coach, and questions about whether a lightly regarded and unranked Virginia Tech team could compete with a top-five North Carolina squad. This latter fact was reflected in the game's point spread. On December 9, shortly after the matchup was announced, spread bettors favored North Carolina to win by 12 points. Several sports commentators, including Lou Holtz and Craig James, said North Carolina deserved a more prestigious bowl game due to its high ranking. "The Alliance has not served its purpose," Holtz said in an interview. "It's politics as usual." The game was the 27th meeting between the two teams, continuing a matchup that first started in 1895. Despite that early beginning, the two teams hadn't played each other since 1946.

Tickets to the game sold quickly at first, but trailed off as the game approached. Virginia Tech sold 5,000 tickets in the first three days after the Hokies were selected, but one week later, Tech managed to increase that total to just 8,300. In an effort to spur sales at the school, Virginia Tech athletic director Jim Weaver asked fans to buy tickets even if they did not plan on attending the game. The tickets could then be donated to charity. As an incentive for Gator Bowl officials to select Virginia Tech, the school agreed to sell 18,000 tickets—more than the minimum 11,500 North Carolina agreed to sell. When a shortfall resulted in Tech selling just 11,000 tickets, the school was forced to purchase the remaining 7,000, costing Virginia Tech $245,000. At North Carolina, tickets sales were even slower, with about 6,000 having been sold through the school two weeks after the matchup was announced. The Gator Bowl ticket office sold approximately 22,000 tickets directly to fans in the same timeframe, and Gator Bowl officials predicted a crowd of between 50,000 and 55,000 people at the game.

=== North Carolina ===
The North Carolina Tar Heels began the 1997 college football season having gone 10–2 in 1996, a year that ended with a 20–13 win over West Virginia in the 1997 Gator Bowl. Hopes were high for the Tar Heels heading into the 1997 season, with some writers and fans picking North Carolina to have a chance to compete for the national championship. The Tar Heels bore out those hopes in the first game of the season, beating Big Ten opponent Indiana, 23–6.

North Carolina rose to No. 7 in the national college football polls, and the victory over Indiana was followed the next week by a 28–17 win over No. 17 Stanford University. The two season-opening wins were followed by six more in succession. The Tar Heels beat Maryland, 40–14, on September 20, and Virginia on September 27 by a score of 48–20. Prior to the win against Virginia, North Carolina, rose from No. 7 to No. 5 in the polls, and remained at that level after the win. Texas Christian University fell 31–10 to the Tar Heels on October 4, and Wake Forest lost to North Carolina, 30–12, on October 11. After a week of inactivity, in which the Tar Heels rose to No. 4, North Carolina defeated in-state rival NC State by a score of 20–7, and after another week and a half, the Tar Heels beat Georgia Tech narrowly, 16–13, in a Thursday night game.

In their ninth game of the season, the Tar Heels lost to No. 2 Florida State, 20–3. The loss was the sole losing effort for the Tar Heels in the 1997 season, and came at the hands of the eventual Atlantic Coast champion Seminoles. During the game, the Tar Heels also lost their then-starting quarterback, Oscar Davenport, to a broken ankle. North Carolina recovered from the loss to win its final two games: 17–10 against Clemson, and 50–14 over Duke. Despite having only one loss, the Tar Heels were denied a chance to participate in a Bowl Alliance game and instead accepted a bid to the 1998 Gator Bowl.

Reduced ticket sales were a concern for Gator Bowl officials, who eyed an expiring television contract with NBC following the game. If attendance and viewership of the game's broadcast were low, it could have a negative effect on negotiations for future contracts with NBC or its rival, CBS.

=== Brown and Torbush ===
Following the conclusion of the regular season and prior to North Carolina's acceptance of the invitation to play in the Gator Bowl, Tar Heels head coach Mack Brown received an offer from the Texas Longhorns to become that school's head coach. A day and a half after Texas extended the offer, Brown resigned his position as North Carolina's head coach and accepted the Texas job. He replaced John Mackovic, who was fired three days earlier after finishing the season with a 4–7 record.

Immediately after Brown's resignation, the question of his replacement and who would coach the team during the Gator Bowl arose. Brown offered to stay on to coach the team through the bowl game, but the proposal was met with hostility from some North Carolina players who felt betrayed by the coach's resignation. School administrators' first choice to replace Brown was then-Georgia head coach Jim Donnan, who previously characterized the North Carolina head coaching position as his "dream job." Donnan rejected the administrators' offer, however, saying that he had a commitment to his then-current players.

Following Donnan's rejection of the North Carolina offer, several Tar Heel players approached North Carolina athletics director Dick Baddour, demanding that he hire Brown's defensive coordinator, Carl Torbush, as the team's new head coach. Torbush and UNC offensive coordinator Greg Davis were considered the two likeliest remaining candidates, but after Davis indicated his intention to follow Brown to Texas, UNC administrators acquiesced to the players' demand and named Torbush as North Carolina's new head football coach.

=== Players' brawl ===
On the same day Mack Brown announced his acceptance of the Texas head coaching position, seven North Carolina football players allegedly assaulted a North Carolina student, severely injuring him. All seven were charged with offenses ranging from misdemeanor assault to simple assault. Among the players charged were defensive leader and All-American linebacker Kivuusama Mays and two other starters on North Carolina's defense. At the time, UNC policy dictated the immediate suspension of any player charged with a felony, and punishment for lesser charges to be decided on a case-by-case basis. After investigating the incident, North Carolina school officials cleared six of the seven accused players to participate in the Gator Bowl with judicial charges still pending. The seventh accused player, backup defensive tackle Ricco McCain, was suspended indefinitely from the team while legal action proceeded.

The North Carolina coaching staff and administration was criticized for allowing the accused players to participate in the game, with at least one critic saying the school only did so in order to better its chances to win the game. Following the game, three of the players—Varian Ballard, Greg Harris and Ricco McCain—were found guilty of simple assault. Two others were found not guilty and charges were dismissed against another. The seventh player, Kivuusama Mays, pleaded no contest to the charge.

=== Virginia Tech offense ===
During the regular season, the Hokies averaged 29.3 points per game and scored at least 21 points in 22 consecutive games—a streak dating to the 1995 season. Virginia Tech's offense was led on the field by quarterback Al Clark, who passed for 1,476 yards and 10 touchdowns. He also ran for 344 yards during the regular season. At the beginning of December, however, Clark underwent arthroscopic surgery on his left knee in order to repair damaged cartilage in the joint. Due to the long recovery time involved with the surgery, it was questioned if he would play in the Gator Bowl or if he would be able to play at full strength. Four days prior to the game, Clark's presence at the game was put even more in doubt when he caught the flu and developed a 102-degree fever. Clark's backup, redshirt freshman quarterback Nick Sorensen, completed 11 of his 21 pass attempts during the season for 140 yards and two touchdowns.

Also injured was Virginia Tech wide receiver Ricky Scales. Scales didn't play for 10 weeks during the regular season because of surgery to an injured tendon. Despite playing in only four games during the season, he finished the regular season as the Hokies' No. 5 receiver, catching 13 passes for 298 yards. Scales' injury caused the Hokies to be ranked among the worst in the Big East in receiving yardage, averaging less than 180 yards per game through the air. As the game moved closer, however, Scales recovered from his injury and appeared near full strength.

Virginia Tech's rushing offense, led by running back Ken Oxendine, led the Big East in rushing yards, averaging 215.3 yards per game. Oxendine entered the Gator Bowl as the No. 5 rusher in Virginia Tech history to that point, and accumulated 904 rushing yards and 13 receptions during his final season as a Hokie. Oxendine was supported by fullback Marcus Parker, who ran for 363 yards and four touchdowns during the regular season. Parker also found success in the passing game, becoming Tech's leading receiver for the season by catching 20 passes for 212 yards. He was the first Virginia Tech runner since 1969 to lead the team in receptions. Backing up Oxendine was running back Lamont Pegues, a transfer student from Clemson who accumulated 85 carries for 391 yards and five touchdowns. All three players were assisted by Virginia Tech's offensive line, which was led by Gennaro DiNapoli. DiNapoli was named to the All-ACC team, but was predicted to face a tough task in stopping North Carolina's top-ranked defense.

=== North Carolina offense ===
On the field, North Carolina's offense was led by quarterback Chris Keldorf. Keldorf was plagued by injuries during his college career, but still managed to set a North Carolina single-game passing record when he threw for 415 yards against Texas Christian University. He replaced original starting quarterback Oscar Davenport, who broke his ankle midway through the regular season. Keldorf finished the season having completed 104 of 181 passes for 1,448 yards, 12 touchdowns, and nine interceptions. With Keldorf and Davenport splitting command during the regular season, North Carolina averaged 27.8 points and 379 yards per game.

The favorite passing target for Keldorf and Davenport was wide receiver Na Brown, who set a school record by catching 55 passes during the regular season. Overall, North Carolina's offense averaged 262 passing yards per game during the season.

On the ground, North Carolina's rushing game was led by running back Johnathan Linton, who finished the season with 1,004 yards and 11 touchdowns. He was the 24th player in North Carolina history to rush for more than 1,000 yards in a season and against Georgia Tech became the first Tar Heel in school history to rush for more than 100 yards and have more than 100 yards receiving in the same game. In a practice just before the game, however, Linton strained a ligament in his right knee, putting his presence at the game in doubt. Linton's backup was Mike Geter, who played in 11 games this year and had 55 rushes for 245 yds and 5 receptions for 20yds. Geter was the team's 2nd Leading Rusher behind Linton North Carolina fullback Deon Dyer, who rushed 25 times for 90 yards during the regular season, was not expected to play in the Gator Bowl due to a fractured fibula suffered in the Tar Heels' 10th game of the season.

=== Virginia Tech defense ===
The Hokies' defense, which appeared strong in the first games of the season, faltered in later games, allowing 129 points in its final five games. During the entire season, the Hokies allowed only 185 points. One of the stars of the Virginia Tech defense was defensive tackle Nat Williams, who had a team-best 8.5 tackles for loss amid 52 total tackles. Linebacker Steve Tate was the team's leader in tackles, recording 104. Former walk-on defensive tackle Kerwin Hairston was fifth on the team in tackles (69) and tied for third in sacks (3.5) and quarterback hurries (eight). Starting linebacker Cory Bird was predicted to miss the game due to a knee injury.

Virginia Tech's special teams squad was more highly regarded than its defense. Overall, Virginia Tech was 14th nationally in net punting and 37th in kickoff returns. Punter Jimmy Kibble was the No. 10 player in the country at his position, averaging 45.1 yards per kick during the regular season. Because of Virginia Tech's success at blocking kicks—the Hokies blocked seven during the season—North Carolina made a special effort to prepare for Virginia Tech's kick blockers on special teams. Virginia Tech placekicker Shayne Graham set Big East single-season records for field goals made (19) and points scored by kicking (92) during the season. He was 35 of 36 on extra points and 19 for 23 on field goals, but caught the flu prior to the Gator Bowl.

=== North Carolina defense ===
North Carolina's defense was among the best in the country during the regular season, finishing the year ranked second in total defense (209.3 yards per game) and fifth in scoring defense (13 points per game). The Tar Heels also were ranked second in the country in terms of rushing yards, allowing an average of 77.9 rushing yards per game during the regular season. Those statistics were due to the performance of three consensus first-team All-America defenders: defensive end Greg Ellis, linebacker Brian Simmons and cornerback Dré Bly. Ellis had 87 tackles during the season (18 for loss) to lead the team in both categories. Another defender, linebacker Kivuusama Mays, was a third-team All-American. Simmons in particular felt confident enough to guarantee prior to the game that the Tar Heels would win if they held Virginia Tech to 20 points or less. No team had scored more than that total since the 1995 season.

Other North Carolina defensive players also performed well during the season. Defensive tackle Vonnie Holliday was named a first-team All-ACC selection after earning 64 tackles—13 for loss. Fellow defensive tackle Russell Davis finished just behind Holliday in total tackles with 60.

The Tar Heels faced a setback on defense when first-team All-ACC defensive back Robert Williams was involved in a car accident that injured his face, neck, and shoulder. Despite requiring more than 20 stitches, however, Williams recovered from his injuries to play in the game.

== Game summary ==
The 53rd edition of the annual Gator Bowl game kicked off on January 1, 1998. An estimated 54,116 fans were in attendance at the game, which was held in Jacksonville's Alltel Stadium, since renamed Jacksonville Municipal Stadium. The game was televised on NBC, and an estimated 5.1 million Americans watched the broadcast, giving the game a television rating of 3.7, 12th highest of the 21 bowl games that season. Charlie Jones, Bob Trumpy, John Dockery were the sportscasters of the broadcast. During the week prior to the game, the weather had been cold and rainy, with temperatures in the mid-40s and more than two inches of rain. At kickoff, the weather was clear, with temperatures near 55 degrees. North Carolina won the ceremonial pre-game coin toss to determine first possession and elected to play defense to begin the game.

=== First quarter ===
The game's opening kickoff was returned to the Virginia Tech 22-yard line, and the Hokies ran the first play of the game—a pass from quarterback Al Clark to fullback Marcus Parker. The play went for nine yards, but the Hokies needed two runs by running back Ken Oxendine to pick up the remaining yard and the first down. From the Tech 32-yard line, the Hokies earned one yard on two plays before Clark completed a seven-yard pass to wide receiver Angelo Harrison. Still short of the first down, the Hokies were forced to punt. The ball rolled out of bounds at the North Carolina 19-yard line, and with 12:16 remaining in the first quarter, North Carolina prepared for its first possession of the game.

On the Tar Heels' first play of the game, running back Jonathan Linton ran up the middle for a three-yard gain. After the gain, Carolina quarterback Chris Keldorf completed a 31-yard pass to tight end Alge Crumpler for a first down at the Virginia Tech 47-yard line. Now inside Virginia Tech territory, Linton ran for a five-yard gain, which was followed by a pass from Keldorf to Linton, who gained 26 yards on the play. Following the catch, North Carolina had a first down at the Virginia Tech 16-yard line. Linton left the field limping slightly, and backup running Mike Geter replaced him, then ran for four yards up the middle. Geter was stopped for no gain on the next play, and a third down pass by Keldorf fell incomplete. North Carolina kicker Josh McGee entered the game to attempt a 29-yard field goal, which was good. With 9:15 remaining in the quarter, North Carolina took a 3–0 lead.

North Carolina's post-score kickoff was returned to the Virginia Tech 25-yard line, and the Hokies prepared for their second possession of the game. Parker was stopped for no gain on a run attempt, and another attempt on the next play was stopped for a loss of a yard. Facing third down, Clark attempted to scramble for the first down, but was stopped after a gain of six yards. Having gone three and out, the Hokies punted again. The kick was downed at the 36-yard line, and North Carolina's offense returned for its second possession of the game. On the first play of the drive, Linton gained two yards on a run up the middle of the field. On the next play, Keldorf completed a 62-yard pass to Octavus Barnes, who had broken free of the Virginia Tech defense. Barnes sprinted into the end zone for a touchdown, and after the extra point kick, North Carolina led 10–0 with 6:07 remaining in the quarter.

Following the kickoff by North Carolina and a short return, Virginia Tech took over at its 26-yard line. On Tech's first play, Clark completed a seven-yard pass to Williams. Running back Lamont Pegues then was stopped for a one-yard loss, and Clark's third-down pass attempt fell incomplete. After again going three and out, Tech punted. The kick was returned to the North Carolina 14-yard line, and the Tar Heels began their third possession of the game. The first play of the drive was a pass from Keldorf to Crumpler, who gained 10 yards and a first down. From the Tar Heels' 24-yard line, Linton gained one yard on a short run, then Keldorf threw a 30-yard pass to wide receiver Na Brown. The play gave the Tar Heels a first down at the Tech 44-yard line, and Linton gained four yards with a running play on first down. Two incomplete passes later, North Carolina punted for the first time in the game. The ball rolled into the end zone for a touchback, and the Hokies' offense started at the 20-yard line with 2:49 left in the quarter.

A one-yard rush was followed by a pass to running back Ken Oxendine that lost three yards. Following the negative-yardage play, North Carolina committed a five-yard penalty that gave the Hokies a third down and seven. Despite the extra yardage provided by the penalty, Clark's pass attempt on third down was incomplete and the Hokies again prepared to punt. During the kick, however, North Carolina defender Quinton Savage broke through the Virginia Tech offensive line and blocked the punt by Jimmy Kibble. Tar Heels' defender Dre Bly picked up the loose ball and ran into the end zone for North Carolina's second touchdown of the game. Following the play, North Carolina was penalized 15 yards for excessive celebration and the resulting 35-yard extra point kick was no good. Despite the missed kick, North Carolina extended its lead to 16–0 with 1:03 remaining in the first quarter.

Virginia Tech's kick returner slipped during the subsequent kickoff, and the Hokies' offense started at its 13-yard line. Oxendine gained three yards on the first play of the drive, then Clark was sacked for a nine-yard loss. The sack was the final play of the first quarter, and North Carolina had a 16–0 lead with three quarters still to be played.

=== Second quarter ===
The second quarter began with Virginia Tech in possession of the ball and facing a long third down after a quarterback sack on the final play of the first quarter. On the first play of the quarter, Tech quarterback Al Clark was sacked by Brian Simmons, and this time he fumbled the ball. The loose ball was picked up in the end zone by Carolina defender Greg Ellis for the Tar Heels' third touchdown of the game. Because North Carolina missed its extra-point kick following its previous touchdown, Tar Heels' head coach Carl Torbush ordered the team to attempt a two-point conversion in order to gain the missed extra point from the previous play. A pass attempt by Keldorf fell incomplete, but with just seven seconds elapsed in the second quarter, North Carolina led 22–0.

The Tar Heels' kickoff was returned to the Hokies' 24-yard line. Clark scrambled for one yard, then completed a five-yard pass. Facing third down and four, Clark scrambled for a first down at the Tech 38-yard line. Following the first down, Parker gained two yards on a running play. Clark then completed a 10-yard pass to Parker, and the Hokies were aided by a 15-yard personal foul facemask penalty against North Carolina during the play. Following the pass and penalty, Tech entered North Carolina territory for the first time and had a first down at the Tar Heels' 35-yard line. On the first play inside Carolina territory, Clark completed a 35-yard pass to Parker for an apparent touchdown, but the play was negated by a 15-yard penalty against Virginia Tech. From the 50-yard line, Pegues ran for four yards and Clark threw two incomplete passes, forcing a punt. The kick was downed at the Carolina 10-yard line, and the Tar Heels' offense took over with 10:40 remaining before halftime.

Linton ran for nine yards, then picked up a first down with a five-yard gain on second down. Keldorf completed a 12-yard pass to Barnes for a first down, Linton ran seven yards to the Carolina 43-yard line, then gained another first down with a run to the 50-yard line. From midfield, Keldorf attempted a deep pass on first down, but the ball fell incomplete. On second down, Keldorf completed a four-yard pass to Linton but was sacked on third down by the Virginia Tech defense. The sack forced Carolina to punt for the second time in the game, and the ball rolled out of bounds at the Virginia Tech 11-yard line.

From that point, Pegues rushed for 13 yards on the first play of the drive, giving the Hokies a first down at their 24-yard line. Two more rushes by Pegues gained seven yards, then North Carolina committed a five-yard offsides penalty, giving the Hokies a first down at the 36-yard line. Clark threw an incomplete pass, Pegues was tackled for no gain on a running play, then Tech committed a five-yard delay of game penalty. On third down, Clark was sacked for a loss, and Tech punted. The kick was partially blocked, allowing North Carolina to return the ball to the 45-yard line of Virginia Tech. The Tar Heels thus began a drive inside Virginia Tech territory with 3:33 remaining in the first half.

The first play of the drive was a six-yard run by Linton, and it was followed by an incomplete pass from Keldorf to Crumpler. Crumpler made up for the missed pass on the next play, when he caught a short pass for a first down from Keldorf. Now at the Hokies' 31, Linton ran straight ahead for a two-yard gain. Linton's run was followed by two incomplete passes by Keldorf, but rather than punt, the Tar Heels attempted to try to convert the fourth down. The fourth-down pass fell incomplete, and the Tar Heels turned the ball over on downs at the Tech 30-yard line. Clark completed a six-yard pass to Parker, then threw an incomplete pass downfield with less than a minute remaining on the clock. On third down, Clark completed a nine-yard pass to Michael Stuewe for a first down. A first-down pass attempt was batted down by the North Carolina defense, but on second down, Clark completed a pass to Stuewe for a first down at the Tar Heels 40-yard line. After a deep pass went incomplete, Clark was sacked and fumbled the ball for the second time in the first half. The loose ball was picked up by Vonnie Holliday with 13 seconds remaining, and the Tar Heels' offense returned to the field. North Carolina tried a deep pass in an attempt to get into scoring position before the end of the half, but Keldorf was sacked and the Tar Heels kneeled on the football to end the half with a 22–0 lead.

=== Third quarter ===
Because Virginia Tech began the first half in possession of the football, North Carolina received the ball to begin the second half. The Hokies' kickoff was returned to the 39-yard line, Virginia Tech committed a 15-yard personal foul penalty, and North Carolina began the first possession of the second half at the Virginia Tech 46-yard line. The first play of the half was a short run by Linton, and after two incomplete passes by Keldorf, the Tar Heels prepared to punt. Rather than kick, however, North Carolina faked a punt and had punter Brian Schmitz pass the ball to linebacker Brian Simmons, who normally played defense. Simmons gained 28 yards and a first down on the play, which allowed the Tar Heels to continue their drive. Now at the Hokies' 13-yard line, North Carolina committed a five-yard delay of game penalty. On the next play, Linton made up the lost yardage, gaining six yards and advancing the ball to the Tech 12-yard line. The running play was followed by a pass from Keldorf to Linton for an eight-yard gain. Needing one yard to gain a first down, North Carolina was stopped on third down then attempted to convert the fourth down rather than kick a field goal. Keldorf ran the ball straight ahead and gained the needed yardage, gaining a first down at the three-yard line. Two plays later, Linton ran across the goal line and into the end zone for the Tar Heels' first touchdown of the second half. The extra point kick was partially blocked by the Virginia Tech defense and was no good, but the Tar Heels still extended their lead to 28–0 with 9:43 remaining in the quarter.

Virginia Tech returned North Carolina's kickoff to their 22-yard line, and the Hokies began their first drive of the second half. Quarterbacking the Hokies was backup quarterback Nick Sorensen, who replaced starter Al Clark. On the drive's first play, running back Ken Oxendine broke free of the North Carolina defense for a 36-yard gain and a first down at the North Carolina 42-yard line. Sorensen scrambled for a two-yard gain, then completed a pass to wide receiver Shawn Scales at the 27-yard line for another first down. A run by Marcus Parker gained one yard, Sorensen was tackled for a two-yard loss, then threw an incomplete pass. Facing fourth down and needing 11 yards, Tech coach Frank Beamer attempted to convert the fourth down rather than punt, and Sorensen scrambled for a first down at the 16-yard line. From there, Oxendine was stopped for a loss of five yards, Sorensen was sacked for a seven-yard loss, and Sorensen completed a short pass to Parker. Beamer elected not to attempt to convert another fourth down and instead sent kicker Shayne Graham into the game to attempt a 40-yard field goal. The kick was good, and with 4:37 remaining in the quarter, Tech cut North Carolina's lead to 28–3.

The Hokie kickoff rolled into the end zone for a touchback, and North Carolina started its second drive of the half from its 20-yard line. The first play of the drive was a three-yard run, and it was followed by a six-yard pass from Keldorf to Linton. Needing a single yard for a first down, the Tar Heels rushed straight ahead and gained two yards and the first down at the 31-yard line. North Carolina continued to move the ball efficiently: Linton gained two yards on a rushing play, then Keldorf threw a short pass to Linton that gained 37 yards after Linton broke free of the Virginia Tech defense. The play resulted in a first down at the Virginia Tech 31-yard line. There, however, Keldorf was sacked for a three-yard loss. After the sack, Keldorf completed a 21-yard pass to Crumpler for a first down at the 13-yard line. Keldorf then attempted to scramble for a gain, but was stopped for no gain. That play was the final one of the quarter, which ended with North Carolina still in possession of a firm lead, 28–3.

=== Fourth quarter ===
The fourth quarter began with North Carolina in possession of the ball and facing a second down and 11 on the Tech 14-yard line. On the first play of the quarter, Keldorf completed a 14-yard pass to Barnes for a touchdown. The extra point was good, and the Tar Heels extended their lead to 35–3 with 14:55 remaining in the game. North Carolina's kickoff was returned to the Tech 34-yard line, and the Hokies' offense began the first full drive of the fourth quarter. Tech's first play of the drive was a trick reverse to Scales, who gained 29 yards and a first down on the trick play. After an incomplete pass by Sorensen from the Carolina 37-yard line, Pegues rushed for four yards, then the Hokies were stopped for no gain on third down. Tech attempted to convert the fourth down, but Sorensen's pass fell incomplete and Virginia Tech turned the ball over on downs with 12:39 remaining.

Following the turnover, the Tar Heels had a first down at their 32-yard line. Linton was stopped for no gain on a rushing play, passed for no gain, then completed a nine-yard pass to Brown. Failing to gain the first down, the Tar Heels punted and the ball was returned to the 30-yard line. Oxendine gained two yards on a rush up the right side, then Sorensen ran for one yard on the left side of the field. On third down, Sorensen scrambled for a first down before fumbling the football. The loose ball was picked up by Tech lineman Derek Smith, and the Hokies' drive continued. After a rush for no gain, another running play resulted in a Tech fumble, their second of the drive. Unlike the previous fumble, however, this one was recovered by North Carolina's Russell Davis, and the Tar Heels offense was put into position for another scoring attempt.

After the turnover, North Carolina had a first down at the Tech 34-yard line. Keldorf threw an eight-yard pass to Crumpler, North Carolina, was stopped for a one-yard loss on a running play, then the Tar Heels earned a first down with a four-yard run by Geter. On first down, Keldorf threw an incomplete pass. Second down resulted in a 15-yard gain and a first down on a run by Geter along the left side of the field. Now at the Tech eight-yard line, Geter ran straight ahead for a five-yard gain. Geter was stopped for a two-yard loss on the next play, but North Carolina recovered from the loss with a five-yard pass from Keldorf to Carrick for a touchdown. The extra point kick was blocked, but a penalty against Virginia Tech allowed Carolina kicker Josh McGee another chance at the extra point. The second attempt was successful, and the kick gave the Tar Heels a 42–3 lead with 5:01 remaining in the game.

The Hokies returned North Carolina's kickoff to the Tech 35-yard line, and the Hokies began their final possession of the game. Sorensen completed a four-yard pass, then ran for 19 yards and a first down at the North Carolina 42-yard line. A shovel pass by Sorensen gained three yards, but he lost three yards on the next play and was sacked for a six-yard loss on third down. A fourth-down pass was batted down by the Carolina defense, and the Tar Heels' offense returned to the field with 2:41 remaining in the game.

Backup quarterback Kevin Carty came onto the field for the Tar Heels, and handed the ball to Dominique Williams, who ran the ball twice for one yard. On third down, he broke free of the Virginia Tech defense and gained 20 yards and a first down at the Tech 33-yard line. Two more rushes gained three yards and ran the remaining time off the game clock. Time expired, and North Carolina won the 1998 Gator Bowl, 42–3.

== Statistical summary ==
Statistical comparison
	VT	UNC
1st downs	14	18
Total yards	185	427
Passing yards	90	318
Rushing yards	95	109
Penalties	6–38.8	3–40.3
Punts	3–11	6–17
Turnovers	3	0
Time of possession	30:29	29:31

In recognition of their performances during the game, North Carolina quarterback Chris Keldorf was named the most valuable player of the winning team, and Virginia Tech backup quarterback Nick Sorensen was named the most valuable player of the losing team. Keldorf finished the game having completed 12 of his 28 pass attempts for 290 yards. On the opposite side of the ball, Sorensen completed four of eight passes for 24 yards and carried the ball 10 times on the ground for a total of 19 yards. Al Clark, the quarterback whom Sorensen replaced, finished the game having completed nine of 17 pass attempts for 66 yards.

North Carolina's receivers benefited from Keldorf's passing proficiency. Octavus Barnes caught three passes for 89 yards and two touchdowns, while Alge Crumpler caught five passes for 77 yards. Virginia Tech's leading receiver was Parker, who caught four passes for just 32 yards. On the ground, North Carolina's Linton carried the ball 20 times for 68 yards and a touchdown. He also was the game's second-leading receiver in terms of yardage, catching six passes for 81 yards. The Tar Heels' Geter was second on the team in rushing, accumulating 25 yards on seven carries. For Virginia Tech, running back Ken Oxendine led all Hokie rushers with 39 yards on 10 carries.

Barnes' 62-yard touchdown reception from Keldorf was the sixth-longest scoring play in Gator Bowl history at the time of the game.

== Postgame effects ==
Virginia Tech's loss dropped it to a final 1997 record of 7–5, while North Carolina's win raised it to a final record of 11–1. The Tar Heels also rose in the final college football polls of the season, finishing in fourth place in the Coaches' Poll and sixth in the Associated Press media poll. Virginia Tech's defeat was its worst loss since a 45–0 shutout by Tulane in 1983. Jacksonville businesses and hotels benefited from the influx of out-of-town guests. At least 25,000 fans arrived from outside of the Jacksonville area, injecting an estimated $30 million extra into the city's economy. Many fans praised the stadium, facilities, and attractions available for visitors. NBC's television coverage of the game was not given as high marks, however, and at least one commentator called the broadcast "sloppy" and "routine".

Though they were concerned by low attendance at the game, Gator Bowl officials were able to renegotiate a sponsorship agreement with Toyota Motor Company after the game's previous contract expired following the game.

=== Coaching changes ===
Though North Carolina head coach Carl Torbush was confirmed in his position prior to the Gator Bowl, several assistant coaching positions were not filled at the school until after the game. On January 11, Torbush hired then-Texas A&M running backs coach Ken Rucker to fill the new position of special-teams coach. To fill Torbush's former job as offensive coordinator, he hired Texas A&M offensive coordinator Steve Marshall, who filled the position until 1999.

=== NFL draft ===
In the weeks following the game, several players from each team announced their intentions to enter the 1998 NFL draft. North Carolina defender Dre Bly was among a handful of eligible players (the National Football League requires a player to be at least three years out of high school) who declined to enter the draft, instead choosing to return to school for another year. North Carolina had seven players taken in the draft, three of whom were selected in the first round: Greg Ellis was taken with the eighth pick, Brian Simmons with the 17th pick, and Vonnie Holliday with the 19th pick. The four remaining selections were Omar Brown (103rd overall), Kivuusama Mays (110th), Robert Williams (128th), and Jonathan Linton (131st). Virginia Tech had no players taken in the first round during the 1998 draft, but four players were taken in later rounds: Todd Washington (104th overall), Gennaro DiNapoli (109th), Ken Oxendine (201st), and Marcus Parker (202nd).
