= List of North Carolina Tar Heels bowl games =

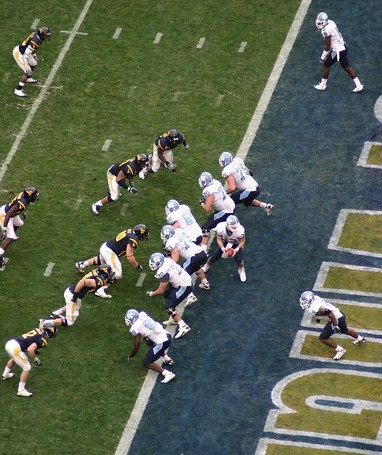
North Carolina quarterback T. J. Yates with the ball in North Carolina's end-zone during the 2008 Meineke Car Care Bowl.

The North Carolina Tar Heels football team competes as part of the National Collegiate Athletic Association (NCAA) Division I Football Bowl Subdivision (FBS), representing the University of North Carolina at Chapel Hill in the Coastal Division of the Atlantic Coast Conference (ACC). Since the establishment of the team in 1888, North Carolina has appeared in 37 bowl games, including four combined appearances in the traditional "big four" bowl games (the Rose, Sugar, Cotton, and Orange).

North Carolina's first bowl game was in 1947, when head coach Carl Snavely led them to the Sugar Bowl, where they lost to Georgia 20–10. Snavely led the Tar Heels to another Sugar Bowl and one Cotton Bowl, which both resulted in losses for the Tar Heels. Taking over for Snavely following the 1952 season was George Barclay, who did not lead the Tar Heels to any bowl games during his three-season tenure. Barclay's successor, Jim Tatum, coached for three years without reaching a bowl game. Jim Hickey replaced Tatum after the 1958 season and coached North Carolina to one bowl game, the 1963 Gator Bowl, where they won their first bowl game in program history.

Bill Dooley succeeded Hickey as head coach and led the Tar Heels to six bowl games through his eleven-season run as head coach. Of the six bowls Dooley led North Carolina to, they won only one, the 1972 Sun Bowl. Dick Crum took over as head coach before the 1978 season. Crum led the Tar Heels to four consecutive bowl victories before losing the final two of his tenure at Carolina. Crum handed over control of the program to Mack Brown after the 1987 season. Brown assisted the Tar Heels into making a bowl game in six straight seasons; however, before the 1998 Gator Bowl, Brown accepted the head coaching position at the University of Texas at Austin and was subsequently barred from coaching in the bowl game. Defensive coordinator Carl Torbush was promoted to head coach. Torbush led the Tar Heels to two bowl victories – the 1998 Gator Bowl and the 1998 Las Vegas Bowl – before being let go after the 2000 season.

North Carolina alum John Bunting was hired as coach before the 2001 season. Bunting led the Tar Heels to a 16–10 Peach Bowl victory in his inaugural season, and later to the 2004 Continental Tire Bowl, where they lost to Boston College. Bunting was dismissed after the 2006 season. North Carolina's then Athletic Director, Dick Baddour, subsequently hired Butch Davis to be the coach of the Tar Heels. Davis brought the Tar Heels to three bowl games before being fired in the midst of an NCAA investigation into the North Carolina football program. Everett Withers took over the program as the interim head coach for the 2011 season. Withers helped the Tar Heels become bowl-eligible and participate in the 2011 Independence Bowl, where they lost by seventeen points to the Missouri Tigers. Larry Fedora, coming off of a successful season as the head coach for the Southern Miss Golden Eagles football team, was hired to be the next head coach for the Tar Heels. After obtaining a bowl eligible record but not being able to play in the postseason due to self-imposed sanctions in his first year, Fedora led North Carolina to a victory in the Belk Bowl over Cincinnati in his second season.

== Key ==
General
†	Bowl game record attendance
‡	Former bowl game record attendance

Results
W	Win
L	Loss

== Bowl games ==
List of bowl games showing bowl played in, score, date, season, opponent, stadium, location, attendance and head coach (Note: Statistics correct as of 2019–20 NCAA football bowl games.)
#	Bowl	Score (Note: Results are sortable first by whether the result was a North Carolina win, loss or tie and then second by the margin of victory.)	Date	Season (Note: Links to the season article for the North Carolina team that competed in the bowl for that year.)	Opponent (Note: Links to the season article for the opponent that North Carolina competed against in the bowl for that year when available or to their general page when unavailable.)	Stadium	Location	Attendance	Head coach
1	Sugar Bowl	L 10–20	January 1, 1947	1946	Georgia	Tulane Stadium	New Orleans	73,300	Carl Snavely
2	Sugar Bowl	L 6–14	January 1, 1949	1948	Oklahoma	Tulane Stadium	New Orleans	82,000^{‡}	Carl Snavely
3	Cotton Bowl Classic	L 13–27	January 2, 1950	1949	Rice	Cotton Bowl	Dallas	75,347^{‡}	Carl Snavely
4	Gator Bowl	W 35–0	December 28, 1963	1963	Air Force	Gator Bowl Stadium	Jacksonville	50,018	Jim Hickey
5	Peach Bowl	L 26–48	December 30, 1970	1970	Arizona State	Grant Field	Atlanta	52,126^{‡}	Bill Dooley
6	Gator Bowl	L 3–7	December 31, 1971	1971	Georgia	Gator Bowl Stadium	Jacksonville	71,208	Bill Dooley
7	Sun Bowl	W 32–28	December 30, 1972	1972	Texas Tech	Sun Bowl Stadium	El Paso	31,312	Bill Dooley
8	Sun Bowl	L 24–26	December 28, 1974	1974	Mississippi State	Sun Bowl Stadium	El Paso	30,131	Bill Dooley
9	Peach Bowl	L 0–21	December 31, 1976	1976	Kentucky	Fulton County Stadium	Georgia	54,132^{‡}	Bill Dooley
10	Liberty Bowl	L 17–21	December 19, 1977	1977	Nebraska	Liberty Bowl Memorial Stadium	Memphis	49,456	Bill Dooley
11	Gator Bowl	W 17–15	December 28, 1979	1979	Michigan	Gator Bowl Stadium	Jacksonville	70,407	Dick Crum
12	Bluebonnet Bowl	W 16–7	December 31, 1980	1980	Texas	Houston Astrodome	Houston	36,667	Dick Crum
13	Gator Bowl	W 31-27	December 28, 1981	1981	Arkansas	Gator Bowl Stadium	Jacksonville	71,009	Dick Crum
14	Sun Bowl	W 26–10	December 25, 1982	1982	Texas	Sun Bowl Stadium	El Paso	31,359	Dick Crum
15	Peach Bowl	L 3–28	December 30, 1983	1983	Florida State	Fulton County Stadium	Georgia	25,648	Dick Crum
16	Aloha Bowl	L 21–30	December 27, 1986	1986	Arizona	Aloha Stadium	Honolulu	26,743	Dick Crum
17	Peach Bowl	W 21–17	January 2, 1993	1992	Mississippi State	Georgia Dome	Georgia	69,125^{‡}	Mack Brown
18	Gator Bowl	L 10–24	December 31, 1993	1993	Alabama	Gator Bowl Stadium	Jacksonville	67,205	Mack Brown
19	Sun Bowl	L 35–31	December 29, 1994	1994	Texas	Sun Bowl Stadium	El Paso	50,612	Mack Brown
20	CarQuest Bowl	W 20–10	December 30, 1995	1995	Arkansas	Joe Robbie Stadium	Miami	34,428	Mack Brown
21	Gator Bowl	W 20–13	January 1, 1997	1996	West Virginia	Jacksonville Municipal Stadium	Jacksonville	45,202	Mack Brown
22	Gator Bowl	W 42–3	January 1, 1998	1997	Virginia Tech	Alltel Stadium	Jacksonville	54,116	Carl Torbush
23	Las Vegas Bowl	W 20–13	December 19, 1998	1998	San Diego State	Sam Boyd Stadium	Whitney	21,429	Carl Torbush
24	Peach Bowl	W 16–10	December 31, 2001	2001	Auburn	Georgia Dome	Atlanta	71,827	John Bunting
25	Continental Tire Bowl	L 24–37	December 30, 2004	2004	Boston College	Bank of America Stadium	Charlotte	70,412	John Bunting
26	Meineke Car Care Bowl	L 30–31	December 27, 2008	2008	West Virginia	Bank of America Stadium	Charlotte	73,712^{†}	Butch Davis
27	Meineke Car Care Bowl	L 17–19	December 26, 2009	2009	Pittsburgh	Bank of America Stadium	Charlotte	50,389	Butch Davis
28	Music City Bowl	W 30–27^{2OT}	December 31, 2010	2010	Tennessee	LP Field	Nashville	69,143	Butch Davis
29	Independence Bowl	L 24–41	December 26, 2011	2011	Missouri	Independence Stadium	Shreveport	41,728	Everett Withers
30	Belk Bowl	W 39–17	December 28, 2013	2013	Cincinnati	Bank of America Stadium	Charlotte	45,211	Larry Fedora
31	Quick Lane Bowl	L 21–40	December 26, 2014	2014	Rutgers	Ford Field	Detroit	23,876	Larry Fedora
32	Russell Athletic Bowl	L 38–49	December 29, 2015	2015	Baylor	Orlando Citrus Bowl Stadium	Orlando	40.418	Larry Fedora
33	Sun Bowl	L 23–25	December 30, 2016	2016	Stanford	Sun Bowl Stadium	El Paso	42,166	Larry Fedora
34	Military Bowl	W 55–13	December 27, 2019	2019	Temple	Navy–Marine Corps Memorial Stadium	Annapolis	24,242	Mack Brown
35	Orange Bowl	L 27–41	January 2, 2021	2020	Texas A&M	Hard Rock Stadium	Miami Gardens	13,737	Mack Brown
36	Duke's Mayo Bowl	L 21–38	December 30, 2021	2021	South Carolina	Bank of America Stadium	Charlotte	45,520	Mack Brown
37	Holiday Bowl	L 27–28	December 28, 2022	2022	Oregon	Petco Park	San Diego	36,242	Mack Brown
38	Duke's Mayo Bowl	L 10–30	December 27, 2023	2023	West Virginia	Bank of America Stadium	Charlotte	42,925	Mack Brown
39	Fenway Bowl	L 14–27	December 28, 2024	2024	Connecticut	Fenway Park	Boston	27,900^{†}	Freddie Kitchens
