= Nick Sorensen =

American football player and coach (born 1978)

Dallas Cowboys
- Title: Special teams coordinator

Personal information
- Born: July 31, 1978 (age 48); Santa Clara, California, U.S.
- Listed height: 6 ft 3 in (1.91 m)
- Listed weight: 210 lb (95 kg)

Career information
- Position: Defensive back (No. 41, 27)
- High school: George C. Marshall (Falls Church, Virginia)
- College: Virginia Tech (1997-2000)
- NFL draft: 2001: undrafted

Career history

Playing
- Miami Dolphins (2001)*; St. Louis Rams (2001–2002); Jacksonville Jaguars (2003–2006); Cleveland Browns (2007–2010)
- * Offseason or practice squad member only

Coaching
- Seattle Seahawks (2013–2015) Assistant special teams coach; Seattle Seahawks (2016) Assistant special teams coach & assistant defensive backs coach; Seattle Seahawks (2017–2019) Secondary coach; Seattle Seahawks (2020) Secondary coach & nickel specialist; Jacksonville Jaguars (2021) Special teams coordinator; San Francisco 49ers (2022) Defensive assistant; San Francisco 49ers (2023) Defensive pass game specialist & nickels coach; San Francisco 49ers (2024) Defensive coordinator; Dallas Cowboys (2025–present) Special teams coordinator
- Stats at Pro Football Reference

Nicholas Carl Sorensen (born July 31, 1978) is an American professional football coach and former safety who is currently the special teams coordinator for the Dallas Cowboys of the National Football League (NFL). He played college football for the Virginia Tech Hokies.

Sorensen signed with the Miami Dolphins as an undrafted free agent in 2001 and played for 10 seasons in the NFL with the St. Louis Rams, Jacksonville Jaguars and Cleveland Browns before retiring. Sorensen joined the Seattle Seahawks as their assistant special teams coach in 2013 and coached their secondary from 2017 to 2020. Sorensen also served as the special teams coordinator for the Jacksonville Jaguars in 2021 before joining the San Francisco 49ers as a defensive assistant in 2022 and served as the defensive pass game specialist & nickels coach in 2023 before being named their defensive coordinator in 2024.

== Early life ==
Sorensen lived in Vienna, Virginia and attended George C. Marshall High School. He lettered three seasons each, in football, basketball, and baseball.

He threw for 1,925 yards and 23 touchdowns during his football career and rushed for 604 yards and 10 touchdowns.

Sorensen was inducted into the George C. Marshall Athletic Hall of Fame, which includes other NFL players Keith Lyle and Mike McCrary.

== College career ==
Sorensen was a four-year letterman for the Virginia Tech Hokies and started at safety and linebacker during his final two seasons where he posted 117 tackles, 10 tackles for losses, four sacks and an interception.

In 1997, as a redshirt freshman, Sorensen earned the backup quarterback position behind Al Clark. He finished the season completing 11 of 21 passes for 140 yards and two touchdowns while also rushing 13 carries for 89 yards. At 19 years and three months of age, Sorensen made a midseason start replacing the injured Clark against the University of Alabama at Birmingham, going making 11 of 21 passes including a 22-yard touchdown pass to Marcus Gildersleeve. Sorensen was named Virginia Tech's Player of the Game in the 1998 Gator Bowl loss to North Carolina.

In 1998, Sorensen was converted into a free safety. He participated in 13 plays on defense and 19 on special teams in the season-opener against East Carolina University, which included completing a 13-yard pass on a successful fake punt for a first down. Sorensen appeared in 25 defensive plays against the University of Miami and ran the option on a successful fake punt. He was moved back to quarterback for the fourth game against the University of Pittsburgh to replace injured backup quarterback Dave Meyer. Sorensen started 3 games at quarterback against Boston College, Temple University and the University of Alabama at Birmingham, making 31 of 59 attempts for 306 yards and 2 passing touchdowns.

In 1999, heSorensen moved full-time to the defensive side as the starter at free safety. The starting quarterback was talented freshman Michael Vick, who led the Hokies to a national championship game and a No. 2 national ranking. Sorensen finished fourth on the team with 70 tackles, one fewer than future NFL player Ben Taylor.

In 2000, Sorensen remained as the starter at free safety. His final game was the 41–20 win against Clemson University in the 2001 Gator Bowl. Sorensen graduated from Virginia Tech with a degree in marketing.

== Professional career ==
Pre-draft measurables
Height	Weight
6 ft 2 1/2 in (1.89 m)	207 lb (94 kg)
Values from Pro Day

=== Miami Dolphins ===
Sorensen was signed by the Miami Dolphins as an undrafted rookie free agent on April 27, 2001, but was waived before the season started.

=== St. Louis Rams ===
Sorensen joined the St. Louis Rams in 2001, where he played for two seasons—including the Rams' appearance in Super Bowl XXXVI.

=== Jacksonville Jaguars ===
Following that Super Bowl season, the Rams cut Sorensen, who was then picked up by the Jacksonville Jaguars. In Jacksonville, he played four seasons in the defensive backfield and as a standout on special teams. Sorensen was the special teams captain during his four years in Jacksonville. In 2006, Sorensen suffered a significant injury, and the Jaguars cut him prior to the start of the 2007 season.

=== Cleveland Browns ===
On October 24, 2007, Sorensen signed with the Cleveland Browns, and on February 29, 2008, the first day of free agency, he re-signed with the Browns.

On October 26, 2008, Sorensen returned to Jacksonville for the first time after being cut by Jaguars head coach Jack Del Rio in August 2007. Sorensen broke up the final play of the game (a pass from David Garrard to Matt Jones) with 13 seconds left in the game. The Browns won the game 23–17 thanks to Sorensen's effort.

As of the end of the 2009 season, Sorensen had not missed any of the 41 games since joining the Browns but had also not made a start. Going into the 2010 season, Sorensen was scheduled to earn $774,340 and was third on the Browns' depth chart behind rookies T. J. Ward and Larry Asante. The presence of the newly drafted rookies meant that Sorensen faced being cut after training camp. He was not and went on to primarily contribute on special teams.

On August 28, 2010, Sorensen was carted off the field with a possible neck injury during an exhibition game against the Detroit Lions. His contract expired at the conclusion of the 2010 season, and Sorensen was not signed in free agency.

== NFL career statistics ==
Legend
**Bold**	Career high

=== Regular season ===
Year	Team	Games		Tackles					Interceptions					Fumbles			
Year	Team	GP	GS	Cmb	Solo	Ast	Sck	TFL	Int	Yds	TD	Lng	PD	FF	FR	Yds	TD
2001	STL	7	0	5	5	0	0.0	**1**	0	0	0	0	0	0	0	0	0
2002	STL	16	0	15	15	0	0.0	**1**	0	0	0	0	0	0	0	0	0
2003	JAX	14	0	14	12	2	0.0	0	0	0	0	0	0	0	0	0	0
2004	JAX	16	0	12	10	2	0.0	0	0	0	0	0	0	**1**	0	0	0
2005	JAX	10	0	9	7	2	0.0	0	0	0	0	0	0	0	0	0	0
2006	JAX	12	0	7	6	1	0.0	0	0	0	0	0	0	0	0	0	0
2007	CLE	9	0	13	11	2	0.0	0	0	0	0	0	0	**1**	0	0	0
2008	CLE	16	0	**26**	**20**	**6**	**0.5**	**1**	0	0	0	0	**1**	0	0	0	0
2009	CLE	16	0	16	13	3	0.0	0	0	0	0	0	**1**	0	0	0	0
2010	CLE	15	0	14	10	4	0.0	0	0	0	0	0	0	0	**1**	0	0
Total		131	0	131	109	22	0.5	3	0	0	0	0	2	2	1	0	0

=== Postseason ===
Year	Team	Games		Tackles					Interceptions					Fumbles			
Year	Team	GP	GS	Cmb	Solo	Ast	Sck	TFL	Int	Yds	TD	Lng	PD	FF	FR	Yds	TD
2001	STL	3	0	0	0	0	0.0	0	0	0	0	0	0	0	2	4	0
Total		3	0	0	0	0	0.0	0	0	0	0	0	0	0	2	4	0

== Coaching career ==
=== Seattle Seahawks ===
From 2013 to 2020, Sorensen was a coach on the Seattle Seahawks staff under head coach Pete Carroll. Sorensen served as a special teams assistant for his first three seasons. Sorensen won his first Super Bowl when the Seahawks defeated the Denver Broncos in Super Bowl XLVIII.

In 2016, Sorensen served as assistant defensive backs coach, and beginning in 2017, he served as coach of the Seahawks' secondary, formerly known as the Legion of Boom.

=== Jacksonville Jaguars ===
In June 2021, the Jacksonville Jaguars announced that they had hired Sorensen as their special teams coordinator. He was hired to replace former Seahawks special teams coordinator Brian Schneider, who left the organization after a brief tenure for personal reasons.

=== San Francisco 49ers ===
In 2022, Sorensen was hired by the San Francisco 49ers as a defensive assistant under head coach Kyle Shanahan. The following season, he was promoted to defensive pass game specialist and nickels coach.

In 2024, Sorensen was promoted to defensive coordinator following the firing of Steve Wilks. The team finished with a 6–11 record, ranked 18th in the league in rushing defense, tied for 27th in scoring defense, ranked 31st in red zone defense, and lost seven of the last eight games while allowing over 30 points in four of those defeats and over 40 points in the last two contests.

On January 7, 2025, it was announced that Sorensen was fired after the 49ers' defense took a major step back in several categories. He was in consideration to become the 49ers special teams coordinator, until the team elected to hire Brant Boyer instead on January 27.

=== Dallas Cowboys ===
On January 28, 2025, Sorensen was hired by the Dallas Cowboys to be the special teams coordinator. He reunited with head coach Brian Schottenheimer, whom Sorensen worked with during his tenures with the Seattle Seahawks and Jacksonville Jaguars.

== Personal life ==
On February 27, 2010, Sorensen married Danielle Berry. They have two sons: Nash and Stone.

Sorensen's cousin, James Augustine, played forward/center in the National Basketball Association. His father, Dick, played football for the Miami Hurricanes from 1965 to 1969. In 2012, Sorensen was working as an analyst for WKYC channel 3 in Cleveland (NBC) on the station's Browns Tonight post-game show.
