= 1998 Peach Bowl =

The 1998 Peach Bowl may refer to:

- 1998 Peach Bowl (January), January 2, 1998, game between the Clemson Tigers and the Auburn Tigers
- 1998 Peach Bowl (December), December 31, 1998, game between the Georgia Bulldogs and the Virginia Cavaliers
