= 1998 Sugar Bowl =

1998 Nokia Sugar Bowl
- 64th Sugar Bowl
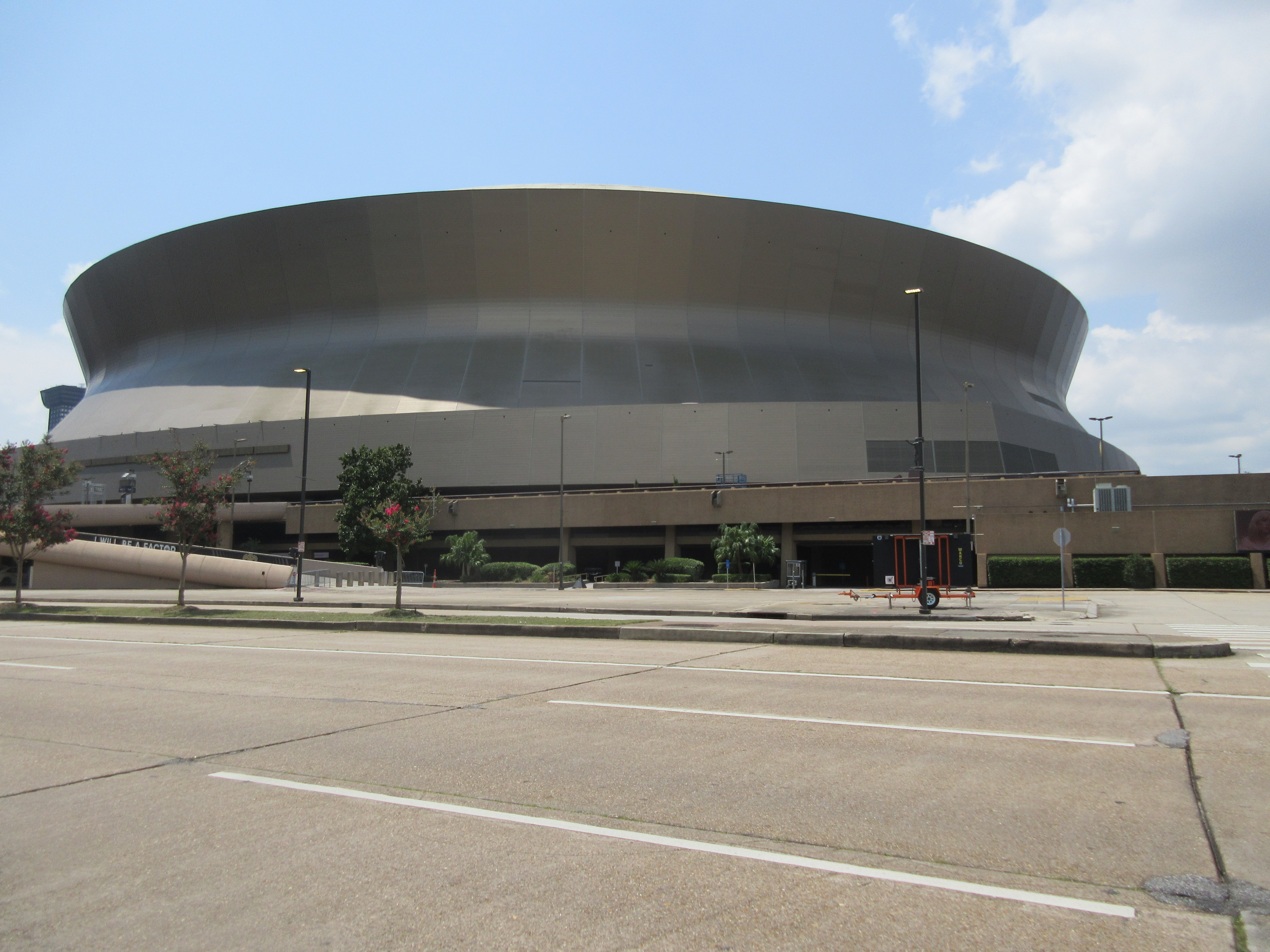
- The Louisiana Superdome in New Orleans, Louisiana, hosted the Sugar Bowl.
| Ohio State Buckeyes | Florida State Seminoles |
| (10–2) | (10–1) |
| Big Ten | ACC |
| 14 | 31 |
| Head coach: John Cooper | Head coach: Bobby Bowden |
| AP / Coaches / BA; 9 / 10 / 9 | AP / Coaches / BA; 4 / 4 / 4 |
| | 1 | 2 | 3 | 4 | Total |
|---|---|---|---|---|---|
| Ohio State | 3 | 0 | 5 | 6 | 14 |
| Florida State | 7 | 14 | 0 | 10 | 31 |
- Date: January 1, 1998
- Season: 1997
- Stadium: Louisiana Superdome
- Location: New Orleans, Louisiana
- Favorite: Florida State by 7 points (47.5)
- Referee: Steve Usechek (Big XII)
- Attendance: 67,289

United States TV coverage
- Network: ABC
- Announcers: Brent Musburger and Dan Fouts

The 1998 Sugar Bowl was played on January 1, 1998. This 64th edition to the Sugar Bowl featured the Ohio State Buckeyes, and the Florida State Seminoles. Ohio State entered the game ranked number 10 in the nation at 10–2, whereas Florida State was ranked at fourth in the nation with a 10–1 mark.

Ohio State scored the first points of the contest with a 40-yard field goal from kicker Dan Stultz, giving the Buckeyes an early 3–0 lead. Later in the first quarter, quarterback Thad Busby threw a 27-yard touchdown pass to wide receiver E. G. Green, giving the Seminoles a 7–3 lead. In the second quarter, Busby scored on a 9-yard touchdown run increasing the Seminole lead to 14–3.

William McCray also scored for the Seminoles, pounding it in from one yard out, to increase Florida State's lead to 21–3 at halftime. Stultz kicked his second field goal of the game, cutting the margin to 21–6. Ohio State later got a safety on Florida State pulling them within 21–8. Early in the fourth quarter, Sebastian Janikowski kicked a 35-yard field goal, increasing Florida State's lead to 24–8. Quarterback Joe Germaine threw a 50-yard touchdown pass to John Lumpkin. The ensuing two-point conversion failed, and the score was 24–14. Florida State capped the scoring with a one-yard touchdown run from McCray, making the final margin 31–14.

This Sugar Bowl was the fifth over nine years for the Bobby Bowden led-Seminoles, who had finished in the final top 4 of the AP and or Coaches Poll in every season from 1987 to 2000. A season later, Ohio State would get back to the Sugar Bowl and win their matchup against Texas A&M. The Buckeyes would end up finishing second in the final polls, one spot ahead of FSU, who lost in the inaugural BCS national championship game against Tennessee.
