= Carl Torbush =

American football and baseball coach (1951–2023)

Biographical details
- Born: October 11, 1951; East Spencer, North Carolina, U.S.
- Died: November 5, 2023 (aged 72); Sevierville, Tennessee, U.S.
- Education: Carson-Newman

Playing career

Football
- 1971–1973: Carson–Newman

Baseball
- c. 1973: Carson–Newman
- Position: Linebacker

Coaching career (HC unless noted)

Football
- 1975: Baylor (GA)
- 1976–1979: Southeastern Louisiana (LB/DE)
- 1980–1982: Louisiana Tech (AHC/LB)
- 1983–1986: Ole Miss (DC/LB)
- 1987: Louisiana Tech
- 1988–1997: North Carolina (DC/LB)
- 1997–2000: North Carolina
- 2001–2002: Alabama (DC/LB)
- 2003–2005: Texas A&M (DC/LB)
- 2006–2008: Carson–Newman (AHC/LB)
- 2009: Mississippi State (DC/LB)
- 2010–2011: Kansas (DC)
- 2012: Liberty (LB)
- 2015–2017: East Tennessee State

Baseball
- 1977–1979: Southeastern Louisiana

Head coaching record
- Overall: 31–48 (football); 75–58 (baseball)
- Bowls: 2–0

Carl William Torbush Jr. (October 11, 1951 – November 5, 2023) was an American football and baseball coach. He served as the head football coach at Louisiana Tech University in 1987, the University of North Carolina at Chapel Hill from 1997 to 2000, and East Tennessee State University (ETSU) from 2013 to 2017, compiling a career college football record of 31–48. Outside of football, Torbush was the head baseball coach at Southeastern Louisiana University from 1977 to 1979, tallying a mark of 75–58. Torbush retired from coaching in December 2017.

== Early life ==
Born in East Spencer, North Carolina, Torbush relocated with his family to Knoxville, Tennessee, at age 11. He attended Austin-East High School in Knoxville, where he played in multiple sports. He received athletic scholarship offers from various Division I schools, but decided to walk-on at the University of Tennessee. After having no playing time as a freshman, he transferred to Carson-Newman College in Jefferson City. As a senior at Carson-Newman, he received first-team NAIA All-American honors in both baseball and football. Torbush graduated from Carson-Newman in 1974.

After college, Torbush coached briefly at Carter High School in Knoxville. In February 1975, he signed with the Kansas City Royals. Following his one-season professional baseball career, he went to Baylor University to begin his collegiate coaching career. He received his master's degree in physical education and health from Baylor in 1976.

== Assistant coaching ==
Torbush began his career as an assistant coach for the Baylor Bears, and later coached for the Southeastern Louisiana Lions, the Ole Miss Rebels, the Louisiana Tech Bulldogs, the Alabama Crimson Tide (where he was the defensive coordinator under Dennis Franchione from 2001 to 2002), Texas A&M Aggies, and the Carson-Newman Eagles. Torbush was part of some mild success at Ole Miss, where he was defensive coordinator from 1983 to 1986. The 1986 season saw Ole Miss compile an 8–3–1 record including a season-ending 20–17 win at the Independence Bowl over Texas Tech. The 1986 Rebel defense allowed opponents an average of less than 13 points per game and statistically ranked as the best defense in the Southeastern Conference. It was after that 1986 season that Torbush was hired away to become head coach at Louisiana Tech.

Torbush stepped down as defensive coordinator at the University of Kansas on May 31, 2011, due to low grade prostate cancer. He was set to begin his second season in this role. In January 2012, Torbush was introduced as the linebackers coach with Liberty University.

== Head coaching ==
=== Louisiana Tech ===
Under Torbush, the team recorded a 3–8 season in 1987 highlighted by the defense and a win over Kansas.

=== North Carolina ===
After only one year as head coach at Louisiana Tech, Torbush joined the UNC coaching staff in 1988 as defensive coordinator and linebackers coach. He was the only member of Mack Brown's original coaching staff to stay throughout Brown's ten-year tenure. He recruited and coached many defensive standouts; his 1997 unit led the nation in total defense and his 1996 unit led the nation in scoring defense. His defenses were often regarded as the best in the country. Torbush was a 1997 finalist for the Broyles Award, given annually to the nation's top assistant coach. During his time at UNC, at least one of his linebackers went pro every year. Among his more notable players were Julius Peppers, Brian Simmons, Greg Ellis, and Dré Bly.

After the 1997 season, Brown announced he was moving to the University of Texas at Austin. He left the team immediately, and Torbush was named to replace him. He coached the team in the 1998 Gator Bowl, capping off one of the Tar Heels' best seasons ever. The Tar Heels finished with an 11–1 record, only the third 11-win season in school history. They also finished sixth in the AP poll and fourth in the Coaches Poll—their highest ranking in the major media polls in half a century. North Carolina credits the 1997 regular season to Brown and that Gator Bowl to Torbush.

Despite the loss of most of the team's defensive stars of the last three years, the Tar Heels were expected to pick up right where they left off in 1998. However, they never really recovered from an unexpected loss to Miami (Ohio) to open the 1998 season, in which they barely managed to qualify for the Las Vegas Bowl. The next year was an unmitigated disaster. The team was riddled with injuries, the most devastating one occurring when quarterback Ronald Curry tore his Achilles tendon. The Tar Heels were so thin at quarterback that they were forced to convert safety Antwon Black to quarterback, but he was lost after two games to mononucleosis. After starting the season 1–1, the Tar Heels didn't win another game until beating NC State in November. They finished 3–8—UNC's first losing season since Brown's two consecutive 1–10 seasons in 1988 and 1989. School officials actually planned to fire him after the season, but an outpouring of support from players and fans led to a change of heart. He was, however, forced to fire several members of his staff, including offensive coordinator Steve Marshall, who had been criticized for being too conservative in his play calling.

The Tar Heels rebounded to finish 6–5 in 2000, although Torbush was fired at the end of the season.

=== East Tennessee State ===
Torbush established the newly restarted program at East Tennessee State, which had last played in the 2003 season. The Buccaneers signed their first class in 2014, redshirting all players, and began a year of practice in preparation for the 2015 season, when the team competed as an NCAA Division I FCS independent. In the 2016 season they joined the Southern Conference. On December 8, 2017, Torbush announced his retirement from coaching. In his time as ETSU head coach, he had an overall record of 11–22 record with 4–12 mark in SoCon play. Overall, he finished with a 31–48 career head coaching record.

== Illness and death ==
In May 2011, Torbush was diagnosed with prostate cancer, and underwent surgery to treat it. He made a recovery and later returned to coaching. In 2023, Torbush was diagnosed with ALS. He died on November 5, 2023, at the age of 72.

== Head coaching record ==
| Year | Team | Overall | Conference | Standing | Bowl/playoffs |
|---|---|---|---|---|---|
Louisiana Tech Bulldogs (NCAA Division I-AA independent) (1987)
| 1987 | Louisiana Tech | 3–8 | | | |
| Louisiana Tech: | | 3–8 | | | |
North Carolina Tar Heels (Atlantic Coast Conference) (1997–2000)
| 1997 | North Carolina | 1–0 (Note: Torbush led the Tar Heels in the 1998 Gator Bowl, the final game of the 1997 season, as a result of Mack Brown leaving UNC for Texas the week prior to the Gator Bowl. North Carolina credits the 1997 regular season to Brown and the Gator Bowl to Torbush.) | | | W Gator |
| 1998 | North Carolina | 7–5 | 5–3 | T–4th | W Las Vegas |
| 1999 | North Carolina | 3–8 | 2–6 | T–8th | |
| 2000 | North Carolina | 6–5 | 3–5 | T–6th | |
| North Carolina: | | 17–18 | 10–14 | | |
East Tennessee State Buccaneers (NCAA Division I FCS independent) (2015)
| 2015 | East Tennessee State | 2–9 | | | |
East Tennessee State Buccaneers (Southern Conference) (2016–2017)
| 2016 | East Tennessee State | 5–6 | 2–6 | 7th | |
| 2017 | East Tennessee State | 4–7 | 2–6 | 8th | |
| East Tennessee State: | | 11–22 | 4–12 | | |
| Total: | | 31–48 | | | |
