= 1997 Clemson Tigers football team =

American college football season

1997 Clemson Tigers football

Peach Bowl, L 17–21 vs. Auburn
- Conference: Atlantic Coast Conference
- Record: 7–5 (4–4 ACC)
- Head coach: Tommy West (4th season)
- Offensive coordinator: Steve Ensminger (1st season)
- Defensive coordinator: Les Herrin (1st season)
- Captains: Raymond Priester; Raymond White
- Home stadium: Memorial Stadium

1997 Atlantic Coast Conference football standings
	Conf.			Overall
Team	W		L	W		L
No. 3 Florida State $	8	–	0	11	–	1
No. 6 North Carolina	7	–	1	11	–	1
Virginia	5	–	3	7	–	4
No. 25 Georgia Tech	5	–	3	7	–	5
Clemson	4	–	4	7	–	5
NC State	3	–	5	6	–	5
Wake Forest	3	–	5	5	–	6
Maryland	1	–	7	2	–	9
Duke	0	–	8	2	–	9
$ – Conference champion; Rankings from AP Poll

The 1997 Clemson Tigers football team represented Clemson University as a member of the Atlantic Coast Conference (ACC) during the 1997 NCAA Division I-A football season. Led by fourth-year head coach Tommy West, the Tigers compiled an overall record of 7–5 with a mark of 4–4 in conference play, placing fifth in the ACC. Clemson was invited to the Peach Bowl, where the Tigers lost to Auburn. The team played home games at Memorial Stadium in Clemson, South Carolina.

Clemson played its first overtime game in program history on November 8, against Duke.

== Schedule ==
Date	Time	Opponent	Rank	Site	TV	Result	Attendance	Source
September 6	1:00 p.m.	No. 11 (I-AA) Appalachian State*	No. 18	Memorial Stadium; Clemson, SC		W 23–12	62,405	
September 13	12:00 p.m.	at NC State	No. 19	Carter–Finley Stadium; Raleigh, NC (Textile Bowl)	JPS	W 19–17	50,000	
September 20	3:30 p.m.	No. 5 Florida State	No. 16	Memorial Stadium; Clemson, SC (rivalry)	ABC	L 28–35	80,939	
September 27	7:30 p.m.	at Georgia Tech	No. 17	Bobby Dodd Stadium; Atlanta, GA (rivalry)	ESPN	L 20–23	45,275	
October 4	1:00 p.m.	UTEP*		Memorial Stadium; Clemson, SC		W 39–7	59,710	
October 11	6:00 p.m.	Virginia		Memorial Stadium; Clemson, SC	ESPN2	L 7–21	74,987	
October 25	3:30 p.m.	at Maryland		Byrd Stadium; College Park, MD	ABC	W 20–9	27,270	
November 1	12:00 p.m.	at Wake Forest		Groves Stadium; Winston-Salem, NC	JPS	W 33–16	23,411	
November 8	12:00 p.m.	Duke		Memorial Stadium; Clemson, SC	JPS	W 29–20 ^{OT}	60,363	
November 15	3:30 p.m.	No. 8 North Carolina		Memorial Stadium; Clemson, SC	ABC	L 10–17	71,514	
November 22	6:00 p.m.	at South Carolina*		Williams–Brice Stadium; Columbia, SC (rivalry)	ESPN2	W 47–21	83,700	
January 2, 1998	3:00 p.m.	vs. Auburn*		Georgia Dome; Atlanta, GA (Peach Bowl, rivalry)	ESPN	L 17–21	71,212	
*Non-conference game; Rankings from AP Poll released prior to the game; All times are in Eastern time

== Rankings ==
Ranking movements Legend: ██ Increase in ranking ██ Decrease in ranking — = Not ranked
	Week																	
Poll	Pre	1	2	3	4	5	6	7	8	9	10	11	12	13	14	15	16	Final
AP	20	20	18	19	16	17	—	—	—	—	—	—	—	—	—	—	—	—
Coaches	21		20	21	15	21	—	—	—	—	—	—	—	—	—	—	—	—
