= Dameyune Craig =

American football player and coach (born 1974)

Current position
- Title: Wide receivers coach
- Team: Georgia State
- Conference: Sun Belt

Biographical details
- Born: April 19, 1974 (age 52); Mobile, Alabama, U.S.
- Education: Mattie T. Blount (Eight Mile, Alabama)

Playing career
- 1994–1997: Auburn
- 1998–2001: Carolina Panthers
- 2002: Indiana Firebirds
- 2002*: Washington Redskins
- Position: Quarterback

Coaching career (HC unless noted)
- 2003: Mattie T. Blount HS (AL) (assistant)
- 2004: LSU (GA)
- 2005: Miami Dolphins (STA)
- 2006–2007: Tuskegee (QB)
- 2008–2009: South Alabama (WR)
- 2010–2012: Florida State (QB)
- 2013–2015: Auburn (co-OC/WR)
- 2016: LSU (WR)
- 2017: Florida State (Quality control)
- 2018–2021: Texas A&M (WR)
- 2022: Texas A&M (QB)
- 2023: Texas A&M (WR)
- 2024–present: Georgia State (WR)

Accomplishments and honors

Awards
- Second-team All-SEC (1997); 1996 Independence Bowl MVP; 1998 Peach Bowl MVP; 1998 Senior Bowl MVP

Dameyune Vashon Craig (born April 19, 1974) is an American football coach and former player. He is the wide receivers coach for Georgia State University, a position he has held since 2024. He was most recently the wide receivers coach at Texas A&M University. Craig played professionally as quarterback in the National Football League (NFL) for four seasons with the Carolina Panthers.

== Early life ==
Craig played high school football for Mattie T. Blount High School in Prichard, Alabama, near Mobile. He helped lead his team to two state championships in 1990 and 1992. In 1992 Craig threw for 2,236 yards with 19 tds and he also rushed for 1,250 yards with 14 TDs while helping to lead his team to a second State title

== College career ==
Craig played college football at Auburn University from 1993 to 1997, where he wore jersey number 16. He was redshirted for the undefeated 1993 season, during Terry Bowden's first year as head coach, then served as the backup quarterback to starter Patrick Nix during 1994 and 1995 (and was MVP of the spring game in 1994 and 1995). Occasionally during those two seasons he would enter the game at quarterback in place of Nix in goalline situations, where his running ability could be put to good use.

He was named Auburn's starting quarterback for the 1996 and 1997 seasons. He led Auburn to victory over Army in the Independence Bowl in 1996, while winning the MVP award and setting Auburn offensive team record of 588 total yards in a 62–0 victory over Fresno State. He also prevailed over Clemson University in the Peach Bowl in 1997 where he was also named the MVP. In that ten-win senior season, he also led the Tigers to the SEC Western Division title and a berth in the SEC Championship Game in Atlanta. Despite a strong performance by Craig, Auburn suffered a narrow loss to Peyton Manning's heavily favored Tennessee Volunteers, 30–29. Craig holds the single season passing record and he was the first QB in Auburn history to throw for over 3,000 yards

== Professional career ==
Craig's NFL career was spent entirely with the Carolina Panthers, with whom he signed as an undrafted free agent in 1998. Craig played quarterback for Carolina sparingly between 1998 and 2001.

Craig also played in NFL Europe with the Scottish Claymores, where he set a professional American football-record by passing for 611 yards in a game between the Claymores and the Frankfurt Galaxy on May 22, 1999. His jersey from the game hangs in the Pro Football Hall of Fame.

Craig's professional playing career ended after spending the 2002 season with the Indiana Firebirds of the Arena Football League.

== Coaching career ==
=== Blount High School ===
Craig entered the coaching ranks with a season as an assistant at his alma mater Blount High School.

=== LSU ===
Craig then spent a season as a graduate assistant at Louisiana State University (LSU) with his previous quarterbacks coach at Auburn, Jimbo Fisher, in 2004.

=== Miami Dolphins ===
In 2005, he followed LSU head coach Nick Saban to the Miami Dolphins as a special teams assistant coach.

=== Tuskegee ===
In 2006, Craig left to become the quarterbacks coach for the Division II Tuskegee University's Golden Tigers. Tuskegee won two Southern Intercollegiate Athletic Conference in Craig's two seasons on staff. They also won the black college football national championship in 2007.

=== South Alabama ===
Craig became the wide receivers coach at the University of South Alabama in 2008.

=== Florida State ===
Craig became the quarterbacks coach at Florida State University (FSU) in December 2009, again reuniting with Fisher, who had been designated as the head coach starting in January 2010. Craig was also recruiting coordinator, and was responsible for recruiting future Heisman Trophy winning quarterback Jameis Winston. FSU secured multiple highly ranked recruiting classes during his time there, and he was named 2012 Atlantic Coast Conference (ACC) Recruiter of the Year by both Rivals.com and Scout.com.

=== Auburn ===
Craig became the co-offensive coordinator and wide receivers coach at his alma mater after being hired by Auburn University head coach Gus Malzahn in January 2013.

=== LSU ===
In February 2016, Craig left Auburn to become the wide receiver's coach for LSU under Les Miles. After Miles was fired during the 2016 season, Craig was fired in February 2017.

=== Florida State ===
In the spring of 2017, Craig returned to Florida State to again work for Jimbo Fisher, where he accepted the position of Quality Control of Offense.

=== Texas A&M ===
In January 2018, Craig followed Fisher to Texas A&M University to become the wide receivers coach for the Aggies. Craig was not retained under new Texas A&M coach Mike Elko after the 2023 season.

=== Georgia State ===
On March 1, 2024, it was announced that Craig had been hired as an offensive assistant under new head coach and former teammate Dell McGee.
