= 1997 Northwestern Wildcats football team =

American college football season

1997 Northwestern Wildcats football
- Conference: Big Ten Conference
- Record: 5–7 (3–5 Big Ten)
- Head coach: Gary Barnett (6th season)
- Offensive coordinator: Greg Meyer (6th season)
- Co-defensive coordinators: Jerry Brown (1st season); Vince Okruch (1st season)
- Captains: Eric Collier; Barry Gardner; Nate Strikwerda
- Home stadium: Ryan Field

1997 Big Ten Conference football standings
	Conf.			Overall
Team	W		L	W		L
No. 1 Michigan $	8	–	0	12	–	0
No. 12 Ohio State	6	–	2	10	–	3
No. 16 Penn State	6	–	2	9	–	3
No. 15 Purdue	6	–	2	9	–	3
Wisconsin	5	–	3	8	–	5
Iowa	4	–	4	7	–	5
Michigan State	4	–	4	7	–	5
Northwestern	3	–	5	5	–	7
Minnesota	1	–	7	3	–	9
Indiana	1	–	7	2	–	9
Illinois	0	–	8	0	–	11
$ – Conference champion; Rankings from AP Poll

The 1997 Northwestern Wildcats football team represented Northwestern University during the 1997 Big Ten Conference football season. They played their home games at Ryan Field and participated as members of the Big Ten Conference. They were coached by Gary Barnett.

== Schedule ==
Date	Time	Opponent	Rank	Site	TV	Result	Attendance	Source
August 23	11:00 am	vs. Oklahoma*		Soldier Field; Chicago, IL (Pigskin Classic)	ABC	W 24–0	36,804	
September 6	2:30 pm	at Wake Forest*	No. 21	Groves Stadium; Winston-Salem, NC	ABC	L 20–27	24,320	
September 13	1:00 pm	Duke*		Ryan Field; Evanston, IL		W 24–20	36,225	
September 20	11:30 am	Rice*		Ryan Field; Evanston, Illinois	SCC	L 34–40	32,762	
September 27	11:30 am	at Purdue		Ross–Ade Stadium; West Lafayette, IN	ESPN	L 9–21	42,112	
October 4	6:00 pm	Wisconsin		Ryan Field; Evanston, IL	ESPN	L 25–26	47,129	
October 11	11:30 am	at No. 6 Michigan		Michigan Stadium; Ann Arbor, MI (rivalry)	ESPN	L 6–23	106,048	
October 18	2:30 pm	No. 11 Michigan State^{†}		Ryan Field; Evanston, IL	ABC	W 19–17	47,129	
October 25	2:30 pm	at No. 9 Ohio State		Ohio Stadium; Columbus, OH	ABC	L 6–49	92,445	
November 1	11:30 am	No. 2 Penn State		Ryan Field; Evanston, IL	ESPN	L 27–30	47,129	
November 8	11:00 am	at Illinois		Memorial Stadium; Champaign, IL (rivalry)	ESPN Plus	W 34–21	41,195	
November 15	11:30 am	No. 22 Iowa		Ryan Field; Evanston, IL	ESPN2	W 15–14	40,838	
*Non-conference game; ^{†}Homecoming; Rankings from AP Poll released prior to the game; All times are in Central time

== Rankings ==
Ranking movements Legend: ██ Increase in ranking ██ Decrease in ranking — = Not ranked т = Tied with team above or below
	Week																	
Poll	Pre	1	2	3	4	5	6	7	8	9	10	11	12	13	14	15	16	Final
AP	—	24	21т	—	—	—	—	—	—	—	—	—	—	—	—	—	—	—
Coaches	—		24	—	—	—	—	—	—	—	—	—	—	—	—	—	—	—

== Roster ==
1997 Northwestern Wildcats football team roster
Players
Coaches
Offense

Pos.	#	Name	Class
WR	5	D'Wayne Bates	Jr
OT	74	Paul Janus	Sr
TE	84	Jay Tant	So

Defense

Pos.	#	Name	Class
DE	36	Casey Dailey	Sr
LB	55	Barry Gardner	Jr

Special teams

Pos.	#	Name	Class

Head coach

- Gary Barnett

Coordinators/assistant coaches

Legend

- (C) Team captain
- (S) Suspended
- (I) Ineligible
- Injured
- Redshirt
