= 1997 Carquest Bowl =

American college football game

Georgia Tech Yellow Jackets	West Virginia Mountaineers
(6–5)	(7–4)
ACC	Big East
35	30
Head coach: George O'Leary	Head coach: Don Nehlen
	1	2	3	4	Total
Georgia Tech	14	14	0	7	35
West Virginia	7	7	10	6	30
- Date: December 29, 1997
- Season: 1997
- Stadium: Pro Player Stadium
- Location: Miami Gardens, Florida
- MVP: QB Joe Hamilton (Georgia Tech)
- Referee: Gil Gelbke (C-USA)
- Attendance: 28,262

United States TV coverage
- Network: TBS
- Announcers: Bob Neal and Mark May

The 1997 Carquest Bowl was a college football postseason bowl game between the Georgia Tech Yellow Jackets and the West Virginia Mountaineers. Played at Joe Robbie Stadium in Miami Gardens, Florida, it was the final year of the sponsorship between this bowl and Carquest, and after this the sponsorship was not renewed.

== Background ==
The Yellow Jackets tied for third in the Atlantic Coast Conference while West Virginia finished 3rd in the Big East Conference. Georgia Tech went from 4-1 to going 2-4 in their last six, including a loss to Georgia. The Mountaineers went from #22 ranked after nine games to losing two straight games, including the Backyard Brawl. The two had just met one previous time in the postseason, the 1954 Sugar Bowl, which Georgia Tech won 42-19.

== Game summary ==
Quarterback Joe Hamilton went 19 for 36 and threw for 274 yards while running for 82 yards with two passing touchdowns and one rushing touchdown as he led Georgia Tech to a 35-30 win over West Virginia. Hamilton drove the Yellow Jackets 80 yards on the opening drive to set up fullback Ed Wilder’s one-yard scoring run. The Mountaineers answered 6 plays later with running back Amos Zereoué and his run of 14 yards to the end zone to tie the score. Tech scored on its next two drives as Hamilton connected with tailback Charlie Rogers for a 17-yard catch, and tight end Mike Lillieon a three-yard pass to go up 21–7 with 10:11 remaining. West Virginia quarterback Marc Bulger threw a 21-yard touchdown pass to receiver Jerry Porter with 4:45 remaining to make it 21–14, but Hamilton ran from nine yards out in the closing seconds to give the Jackets a 28–14 halftime lead. Zereous ran for his second touchdown in the third quarter on a State of Liberty play to narrow the lead five minutes into the quarter, and Jay Taylor's field goal made it 28–24 going into the fourth quarter. Charles Wiley scored the touchdown that would ultimately provide the winning margin from 5 yards out to make it 35–24 with 4:44 to go. Porter caught another pass from Bulger for a touchdown with less than three minutes to go, but the conversion attempt failed, and the Mountaineers did not get the ball again, with the Jackets in Mountaineer territory by the time they ran out the clock. Derrick Steagall had seven receptions for 112 yards. Bulger was 25-of-40 for a career-high 353 yards with 2 touchdowns and one interception. This was West Virginia's seventh straight bowl loss and Georgia Tech's fourth straight win.

== Aftermath ==
Georgia Tech has returned just once to this bowl (Champs Sports Bowl), in 2004. West Virginia returned in 2016 (Russell Athletic Bowl). This bowl, played in Orlando, Florida since 2001, is now called the Camping World Bowl.

== Statistics ==
Statistics	Georgia Tech	West Virginia
First downs	28	24
Yards rushing	210	56
Yards passing	274	353
Total yards	484	409
Fumbles-Lost	1-1	1-1
Interceptions	0	1
Punts	4-42.0	3-43.3
Penalties-Yards	10-86	9-75
