= 1997 Maryland Terrapins football team =

American college football season

1997 Maryland Terrapins football
- Conference: Atlantic Coast Conference
- Record: 2–9 (1–7 ACC)
- Head coach: Ron Vanderlinden (1st season)
- Offensive coordinator: Craig Johnson (1st season)
- Defensive coordinator: Wally Ake (1st season)
- Home stadium: Byrd Stadium

1997 Atlantic Coast Conference football standings
	Conf.			Overall
Team	W		L	W		L
No. 3 Florida State $	8	–	0	11	–	1
No. 6 North Carolina	7	–	1	11	–	1
Virginia	5	–	3	7	–	4
No. 25 Georgia Tech	5	–	3	7	–	5
Clemson	4	–	4	7	–	5
NC State	3	–	5	6	–	5
Wake Forest	3	–	5	5	–	6
Maryland	1	–	7	2	–	9
Duke	0	–	8	2	–	9
$ – Conference champion; Rankings from AP Poll

The 1997 Maryland Terrapins football team represented the University of Maryland in the 1997 NCAA Division I-A football season. In their first season under head coach Ron Vanderlinden, the Terrapins compiled a 2–9 record, finished in seventh place in the Atlantic Coast Conference, and were outscored by their opponents 355 to 161. The team's statistical leaders included Brian Cummings with 1,760 passing yards, LaMont Jordan with 689 rushing yards, and Moises Cruz with 337 receiving yards.

== Schedule ==
Date	Time	Opponent	Site	TV	Result	Attendance	Source
September 6	6:00 p.m.	Ohio*	Byrd Stadium; College Park, MD		L 14–21	30,100	
September 13	3:30 p.m.	at No. 5 Florida State	Doak Campbell Stadium; Tallahassee, FL	ABC	L 7–50	72,238	
September 20	12:00 p.m.	No. 6 North Carolina	Byrd Stadium; College Park, MD	JPS	L 14–40	30,084	
September 27	6:00 p.m.	at Temple*	Franklin Field; Philadelphia, PA		W 24–21	12,872	
October 4	3:30 p.m.	Duke	Byrd Stadium; College Park, MD		W 16–10	23,206	
October 11	1:00 p.m.	West Virginia*	Byrd Stadium; College Park, MD (rivalry)		L 14–31	31,210	
October 18	1:00 p.m.	at Wake Forest	Groves Stadium; Winston-Salem, NC		L 17–35	17,893	
October 25	3:30 p.m.	Clemson	Byrd Stadium; College Park, MD	ABC	L 9–20	27,270	
November 1	12:00 p.m.	Virginia	Byrd Stadium; College Park, MD (rivalry)	JPS	L 0–45	23,479	
November 8		at NC State	Carter–Finley Stadium; Raleigh, NC		L 28–45	43,500	
November 22	3:30 p.m.	at Georgia Tech	Bobby Dodd Stadium; Atlanta, GA	ABC	L 18–37	35,267	
*Non-conference game; Rankings from AP Poll released prior to the game; All times are in Eastern time
