= 1997 Wake Forest Demon Deacons football team =

American college football season

1997 Wake Forest Demon Deacons football
- Conference: Atlantic Coast Conference
- Record: 5–6 (3–5 ACC)
- Head coach: Jim Caldwell (5th season)
- Offensive coordinator: Hank Small (1st season)
- Offensive scheme: Pro-style
- Defensive coordinator: James Bell (1st season)
- Base defense: 4–3
- Captains: Thabiti Davis; Robert Fatzinger; Chris Gaskell; D'Angelo Solomon
- Home stadium: Groves Stadium

1997 Atlantic Coast Conference football standings
	Conf.			Overall
Team	W		L	W		L
No. 3 Florida State $	8	–	0	11	–	1
No. 6 North Carolina	7	–	1	11	–	1
Virginia	5	–	3	7	–	4
No. 25 Georgia Tech	5	–	3	7	–	5
Clemson	4	–	4	7	–	5
NC State	3	–	5	6	–	5
Wake Forest	3	–	5	5	–	6
Maryland	1	–	7	2	–	9
Duke	0	–	8	2	–	9
$ – Conference champion; Rankings from AP Poll

The 1997 Wake Forest Demon Deacons football team was an American football team that represented Wake Forest University during the 1997 NCAA Division I-A football season. In their fifth season under head coach Jim Caldwell, the Demon Deacons compiled a 5–6 record and finished in a tie for sixth place in the Atlantic Coast Conference.

== Schedule ==
Date	Time	Opponent	Site	TV	Result	Attendance	Source
September 6	3:30 pm	No. 21 Northwestern*	Groves Stadium; Winston-Salem, NC	ABC	W 27–20	24,320	
September 13	3:30 pm	at East Carolina*	Dowdy–Ficklen Stadium; Greenville, NC	FSN	L 24–25	38,031	
September 20	6:30 pm	Georgia Tech	Groves Stadium; Winston-Salem, NC		L 26–28	22,832	
September 25	8:00 pm	NC State	Groves Stadium; Winston-Salem, NC (rivalry)	ESPN	W 19–18	24,259	
October 4	12:00 pm	at Virginia	Scott Stadium; Charlottesville, VA	JPS	L 13–21	40,000	
October 11	12:00 pm	at No. 5 North Carolina	Kenan Memorial Stadium; Chapel Hill, NC (rivalry)	JPS	L 12–30	57,000	
October 18	1:00 pm	Maryland	Groves Stadium; Winston-Salem, NC		W 35–17	17,893	
October 25	12:00 pm	at Duke	Wallace Wade Stadium; Durham, NC (rivalry)	JPS	W 38–24	28,531	
November 1	12:00 pm	Clemson^{†}	Groves Stadium; Winston-Salem, NC	JPS	L 16–33	23,411	
November 8	12:00 pm	at Rutgers*	Rutgers Stadium; Piscataway, NJ	ESPN Plus	W 28–14	11,717	
November 15	12:00 pm	at No. 2 Florida State	Doak Campbell Stadium; Tallahassee, FL	JPS	L 7–58	70,026	
*Non-conference game; ^{†}Homecoming; Rankings from AP Poll released prior to the game; All times are in Eastern time

== Team leaders ==
Category	Team Leader	Att/Cth	Yds
Passing	Brian Kuklick	190/312	2,180
Rushing	Herman Lewis	114	491
Receiving	Desmond Clark	72	950
