= 1997 Duke Blue Devils football team =

American college football season

1997 Duke Blue Devils football
- Conference: Atlantic Coast Conference
- Record: 2–9 (0–8 ACC)
- Head coach: Fred Goldsmith (4th season)
- Offensive coordinator: Larry Beckish (2nd season)
- Defensive coordinator: Bob Trott (2nd season)
- MVP: Chike Egbuniwe
- Captains: Jeff Hodrick; Chike Egbuniwe
- Home stadium: Wallace Wade Stadium

1997 Atlantic Coast Conference football standings
	Conf.			Overall
Team	W		L	W		L
No. 3 Florida State $	8	–	0	11	–	1
No. 6 North Carolina	7	–	1	11	–	1
Virginia	5	–	3	7	–	4
No. 25 Georgia Tech	5	–	3	7	–	5
Clemson	4	–	4	7	–	5
NC State	3	–	5	6	–	5
Wake Forest	3	–	5	5	–	6
Maryland	1	–	7	2	–	9
Duke	0	–	8	2	–	9
$ – Conference champion; Rankings from AP Poll

The 1997 Duke Blue Devils football team represented Duke University as a member of the Atlantic Coast Conference (ACC) during the 1997 NCAA Division I-A football season. Led by fourth-year head coach Fred Goldsmith, the Blue Devils compiled an overall record of 2–9 with a mark of 0–8 in conference play, placing last out of nine teams in the ACC. The team played home games at Wallace Wade Stadium in Durham, North Carolina.

== Schedule ==
Date	Time	Opponent	Site	TV	Result	Attendance	Source
September 6	7:00 pm	NC State	Wallace Wade Stadium; Durham, NC (rivalry)		L 14–45	33,214	
September 13	2:00 pm	at Northwestern*	Ryan Field; Evanston, IL		L 20–24	36,225	
September 20	7:00 pm	Army*	Wallace Wade Stadium; Durham, NC		W 20–17	21,748	
September 27	12:00 pm	Navy*^{†}	Wallace Wade Stadium; Durham, NC	JPS	W 26–17	17,370	
October 4	3:30 pm	at Maryland	Byrd Stadium; College Park, MD		L 10–16	23,206	
October 11	7:00 pm	No. 4 Florida State	Wallace Wade Stadium; Durham, NC		L 27–51	21,557	
October 18	12:00 pm	at Virginia	Scott Stadium; Charlottesville, VA	JPS	L 10–13	36,600	
October 25	12:00 pm	Wake Forest	Wallace Wade Stadium; Durham, NC (rivalry)	JPS	L 24–38	28,531	
November 8	12:00 pm	at Clemson	Memorial Stadium; Clemson, SC	JPS	L 20–29 ^{OT}	60,363	
November 15	1:30 pm	Georgia Tech	Wallace Wade Stadium; Durham, NC		L 38–41	22,638	
November 22	12:00 pm	at No. 8 North Carolina	Kenan Memorial Stadium; Chapel Hill, NC (Victory Bell)	JPS	L 14–50	53,500	
*Non-conference game; ^{†}Homecoming; Rankings from AP Poll released prior to the game; All times are in Eastern time
