= Auburn–Clemson football rivalry =

American college football rivalry

- Auburn Tigers Clemson Tigers
- First meeting: October 28, 1899; Auburn, 34–0
- Latest meeting: September 9, 2017; Clemson, 14–6
- Next meeting: TBD

Statistics
- Total meetings: 51
- All-time series: Auburn leads, 34–15–2
- Largest victory: Auburn, 56–0 (1921)
- Longest win streak: Auburn 14, (1952–2010)
- Current win streak: Clemson 4, (2011–present)

Locations of Auburn and Clemson

The Auburn–Clemson football rivalry is an American college football rivalry between the Auburn Tigers and Clemson Tigers.

== Series history ==
The rivalry began in 1899 and was played almost annually up until 1929. It was renewed in 1940 on an annual basis until 1955, with only a three-year break from 1943–45 for World War II. After that, the series became much more intermittent. They have faced each other in two bowl games; the 1998 Peach Bowl and the 2007 Chick-fil-A Bowl.

== Game results ==
Auburn victories	Clemson victories	Tie games

No.	Date	Location	Winner	Score
1	October 28, 1899	Auburn, AL	Auburn	34–0
2	November 15, 1902	Auburn, AL	Clemson	16–0
3	October 15, 1904	Clemson, SC	Auburn	5–0
4	November 11, 1905	Auburn, AL	Clemson	6–0
5	November 10, 1906	Clemson, SC	Clemson	6–4
6	November 2, 1907	Auburn, AL	Auburn	12–0
7	October 22, 1910	Auburn, AL	Auburn	17–0
8	October 14, 1911	Clemson, SC	Auburn	29–0
9	October 19, 1912	Auburn, AL	Auburn	27–6
10	October 18, 1913	Clemson, SC	Auburn	20–0
11	October 17, 1914	Auburn, AL	Auburn	28–0
12	October 16, 1915	Anderson, SC	Auburn	14–0
13	October 20, 1916	Auburn, AL	Auburn	28–0
14	October 19, 1917	Clemson, SC	Auburn	7–0
15	October 17, 1919	Auburn, AL	Auburn	7–0
16	October 15, 1920	Clemson, SC	Auburn	21–0
17	October 14, 1921	Auburn, AL	Auburn	56–0
18	September 29, 1923	Clemson, SC	Tie	0–0
19	October 4, 1924	Auburn, AL	Auburn	13–0
20	October 3, 1925	Clemson, SC	Auburn	13–6
21	October 2, 1926	Auburn, AL	Auburn	47–0
22	October 1, 1927	Clemson, SC	Clemson	3–0
23	October 6, 1928	Auburn, AL	Clemson	6–0
24	October 5, 1929	Clemson, SC	Clemson	26–7
25	November 9, 1940	Auburn, AL	Auburn	21–7
26	November 29, 1941	Auburn, AL	Auburn	28–7

No.	Date	Location	Winner	Score
27	November 28, 1942	Auburn, AL	#16 Auburn	41–13
28	November 23, 1946	Montgomery, AL	Clemson	21–13
29	November 22, 1947	Clemson, SC	Clemson	34–18
30	November 27, 1948	Mobile, AL	#9 Clemson	7–6
31	November 26, 1949	Mobile, AL	Tie	20–20
32	November 25, 1950	Auburn, AL	#11 Clemson	41–0
33	November 24, 1951	Clemson, SC	Clemson	34–0
34	November 22, 1952	Auburn, AL	Auburn	3–0
35	November 21, 1953	Clemson, SC	#14 Auburn	45–19
36	November 20, 1954	Auburn, AL	#18 Auburn	27–6
37	November 19, 1955	Mobile, AL	#12 Auburn	21–0
38	October 28, 1961	Auburn, AL	Auburn	24–14
39	October 27, 1962	Clemson, SC	Auburn	17–14
40	October 14, 1967	Auburn, AL	Auburn	43–21
41	October 12, 1968	Clemson, SC	Auburn	21–10
42	October 11, 1969	Auburn, AL	#20 Auburn	51–0
43	October 10, 1970	Clemson, SC	#9 Auburn	44–0
44	October 23, 1971	Auburn, AL	#5 Auburn	35–13
45	January 2, 1998	Atlanta, GA	#13 Auburn	21–17
46	December 31, 2007	Atlanta, GA	#22 Auburn	23–20^{OT}
47	September 18, 2010	Auburn, AL	#16 Auburn	27–24^{OT}
48	September 17, 2011	Clemson, SC	Clemson	38–24
49	September 1, 2012	Atlanta, GA	#14 Clemson	26–19
50	September 3, 2016	Auburn, AL	#2 Clemson	19–13
51	September 9, 2017	Clemson, SC	#3 Clemson	14–6
Series: Auburn leads 34–15–2

== See also ==
- List of NCAA college football rivalry games
