= 1997 Virginia Cavaliers football team =

American college football season

1997 Virginia Cavaliers football
- Conference: Atlantic Coast Conference
- Record: 7–4 (5–3 ACC)
- Head coach: George Welsh (16th season)
- Offensive coordinator: Sparky Woods (1st season)
- Defensive coordinator: Rick Lantz (7th season)
- Captains: Doug Karczewski; Anthony Poindexter
- Home stadium: Scott Stadium

1997 Atlantic Coast Conference football standings
	Conf.			Overall
Team	W		L	W		L
No. 3 Florida State $	8	–	0	11	–	1
No. 6 North Carolina	7	–	1	11	–	1
Virginia	5	–	3	7	–	4
No. 25 Georgia Tech	5	–	3	7	–	5
Clemson	4	–	4	7	–	5
NC State	3	–	5	6	–	5
Wake Forest	3	–	5	5	–	6
Maryland	1	–	7	2	–	9
Duke	0	–	8	2	–	9
$ – Conference champion; Rankings from AP Poll

The 1997 Virginia Cavaliers football team represented the University of Virginia as a member of the Atlantic Coast Conference (ACC) during the 1997 NCAA Division I-A football season. Led by 16th-year head coach George Welsh, the Cavaliers compiled an overall record of 7–4 with a mark of 5–3 in conference play, tying for third place in the ACC. The team played home games at Scott Stadium in Charlottesville, Virginia.

== Schedule ==
Date	Time	Opponent	Site	TV	Result	Attendance	Source
September 4	8:00 pm	No. 16 Auburn*	Scott Stadium; Charlottesville, VA	ESPN	L 17–28	45,300	
September 13	3:30 pm	Richmond*	Scott Stadium; Charlottesville, VA		W 26–7	38,200	
September 27	12:00 pm	at No. 5 North Carolina	Kenan Memorial Stadium; Chapel Hill, NC (South's Oldest Rivalry)	ABC	L 20–48	57,800	
October 4	12:00 pm	Wake Forest^{†}	Scott Stadium; Charlottesville, VA	JPS	W 21–13	40,000	
October 11	6:00 pm	at Clemson	Memorial Stadium; Clemson, SC	ESPN2	W 21–7	74,987	
October 18	12:00 pm	Duke	Scott Stadium; Charlottesville, VA	JPS	W 13–10	36,600	
October 25	7:00 pm	No. 3 Florida State	Scott Stadium; Charlottesville, VA (Jefferson–Eppes Trophy)	ESPN	L 21–47	45,300	
November 1	12:00 pm	at Maryland	Byrd Stadium; College Park, MD (rivalry)	JPS	W 45–0	23,479	
November 8	3:30 pm	Georgia Tech	Scott Stadium; Charlottesville, VA	ABC	W 35–31	41,000	
November 15	12:00 pm	at NC State	Carter–Finley Stadium; Raleigh, NC	JPS	L 24–31	42,400	
November 29	5:30 pm	Virginia Tech*	Scott Stadium; Charlottesville, VA (rivalry)	ESPN	W 34–20	44,200	
*Non-conference game; ^{†}Homecoming; Rankings from AP Poll released prior to the game; All times are in Eastern time

== Personnel ==
1997 Virginia Cavaliers football team roster
Players			Coaches
Offense: Pos. / # / Name / Class; QB / / Aaron Brooks	Defense: Pos. / # / Name / Class; LB / 9 / Shannon Taylor / So	Special teams: Pos. / # / Name / Class	Head coach: George Welsh; Coordinators/assistant coaches: Paul Schudel – Offensive line; Legend: (C) Team captain; (S) Suspended; (I) Ineligible; Injured; Redshirt
