= 1998 Peach Bowl (January) =

American college football game

1998 Chick-fil-A Peach Bowl
- 30th Peach Bowl
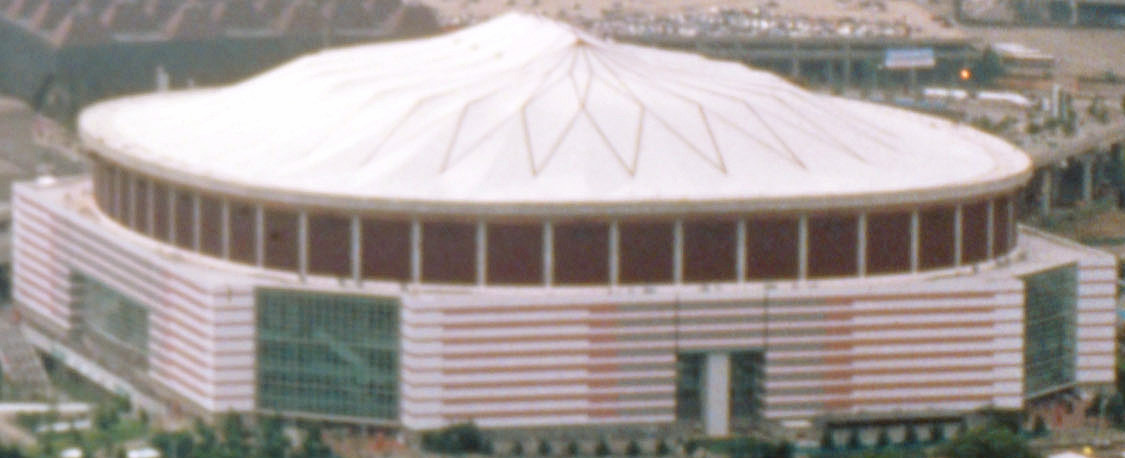
- The Georgia Dome in Atlanta, Georgia, hosted the Peach Bowl.
Clemson Tigers	Auburn Tigers
(7–4)	(9–3)
ACC	SEC
17	21
Head coach: Tommy West	Head coach: Terry Bowden
	AP / Coaches / BA; 13 / 13 / 13
	1	2	3	4	Total
Clemson	0	7	10	0	17
Auburn	3	3	0	15	21
- Date: January 2, 1998
- Season: 1997
- Stadium: Georgia Dome
- Location: Atlanta, Georgia
- MVP: Offensive: Dameyune Craig, Auburn; Defensive: Takeo Spikes, Auburn
- Referee: Jim Kemerling (Big Ten)
- Attendance: 71,212

United States TV coverage
- Network: ESPN
- Announcers: Dave Barnett, Bill Curry and Dave Ryan

The 1998 Peach Bowl, part of the 1997 bowl game season, featured the Clemson Tigers and the Auburn Tigers.

Auburn overcame a 17–6 deficit, largely caused by three blocked punts, entering the fourth quarter to score 15 unanswered points, posting a 21–17 victory. Auburn quarterback Dameyune Craig threw a touchdown pass to Karsten Bailey for the first of three scores in the final frame. Then Rusty Williams gave Auburn the lead with a seven-yard touchdown run before Jaret Holmes booted the final field goal, one of his three successful kicks in the game.

== See also ==
- Auburn–Clemson football rivalry
