= 1997 NC State Wolfpack football team =

American college football team season

1997 NC State Wolfpack football
- Conference: Atlantic Coast Conference
- Record: 6–5 (3–5 ACC)
- Head coach: Mike O'Cain (5th season)
- Offensive coordinator: Jimmy Kiser (1st season)
- Co-defensive coordinators: Kent Briggs (2nd season); Jeff Snipes (1st season)
- Home stadium: Carter–Finley Stadium

1997 Atlantic Coast Conference football standings
	Conf.			Overall
Team	W		L	W		L
No. 3 Florida State $	8	–	0	11	–	1
No. 6 North Carolina	7	–	1	11	–	1
Virginia	5	–	3	7	–	4
No. 25 Georgia Tech	5	–	3	7	–	5
Clemson	4	–	4	7	–	5
NC State	3	–	5	6	–	5
Wake Forest	3	–	5	5	–	6
Maryland	1	–	7	2	–	9
Duke	0	–	8	2	–	9
$ – Conference champion; Rankings from AP Poll

The 1997 NC State Wolfpack football team represented North Carolina State University in the 1997 NCAA Division I-A football season. The team was led by fifth-year head coach Mike O'Cain and played its home games at Carter–Finley Stadium. They finished the season with a 6–5 record overall and a 3–5 record in Atlantic Coast Conference (ACC) games.

== Schedule ==
Date	Opponent	Site	Result	Attendance	Source
August 30	at No. 13 Syracuse*	Carrier Dome; Syracuse, NY	W 32–31 ^{OT}	47,742	
September 6	at Duke	Wallace Wade Stadium; Durham, NC (rivalry)	W 45–14	33,214	
September 13	No. 19 Clemson	Carter–Finley Stadium; Raleigh, NC (Textile Bowl)	L 17–19	50,000	
September 20	Northern Illinois*	Carter–Finley Stadium; Raleigh, NC	W 41–14	51,500	
September 25	at Wake Forest	Groves Stadium; Winston-Salem, NC (rivalry)	L 18–19	24,259	
October 11	at No. 25 Georgia Tech	Bobby Dodd Stadium; Atlanta, GA	L 17–27	44,195	
October 18	No. 4 North Carolina	Carter–Finley Stadium; Raleigh, NC (rivalry)	L 7–20	51,500	
November 1	at No. 3 Florida State	Doak Campbell Stadium; Tallahassee, FL	L 35–48	71,415	
November 8	Maryland	Carter–Finley Stadium; Raleigh, NC	W 45–28	43,500	
November 15	Virginia	Carter–Finley Stadium; Raleigh, NC	W 31–24	42,400	
November 22	East Carolina*	Carter–Finley Stadium; Raleigh, NC (rivalry)	W 37–24	51,500	
*Non-conference game; Rankings from AP Poll released prior to the game

== Rankings ==
Ranking movements Legend: ██ Increase in ranking ██ Decrease in ranking — = Not ranked
	Week																	
Poll	Pre	1	2	3	4	5	6	7	8	9	10	11	12	13	14	15	16	Final
AP	—	—	—	—	—	—	—	—	—	—	—	—	—	—	—	—	—	—
Coaches	—		—	25	—	—	—	—	—	—	—	—	—	—	—	—	—	—
