= 1997 North Carolina Tar Heels football team =

American college football season

1997 North Carolina Tar Heels football

Gator Bowl champion

Gator Bowl, W 42–3 vs. Virginia Tech
- Conference: Atlantic Coast Conference

Ranking
- Coaches: No. 4
- AP: No. 6
- Record: 11–1 (7–1 ACC)
- Head coach: Mack Brown (10th season; regular season); Carl Torbush (interim; bowl game)
- Offensive coordinator: Greg Davis (2nd season)
- Offensive scheme: Multiple
- Defensive coordinator: Carl Torbush (10th season)
- Base defense: 4–3
- Captains: Greg Ellis; Vonnie Holliday; Jonathan Linton; Jeff Saturday; Brian Simmons
- Home stadium: Kenan Memorial Stadium

1997 Atlantic Coast Conference football standings
	Conf.			Overall
Team	W		L	W		L
No. 3 Florida State $	8	–	0	11	–	1
No. 6 North Carolina	7	–	1	11	–	1
Virginia	5	–	3	7	–	4
No. 25 Georgia Tech	5	–	3	7	–	5
Clemson	4	–	4	7	–	5
NC State	3	–	5	6	–	5
Wake Forest	3	–	5	5	–	6
Maryland	1	–	7	2	–	9
Duke	0	–	8	2	–	9
$ – Conference champion; Rankings from AP Poll

The 1997 North Carolina Tar Heels football team represented the University of North Carolina at Chapel Hill during the 1997 NCAA Division I-A football season. The Tar Heels played their home games at Kenan Memorial Stadium in Chapel Hill, North Carolina and competed in the Atlantic Coast Conference. The team was coached by Mack Brown and finished the season 11–1 overall, 7–1 in the conference.

At the end of the season, Brown left for the University of Texas at Austin and did not coach in the Gator Bowl victory over Virginia Tech. Carl Torbush, who was the defensive coordinator during the regular season, became the head coach when Brown left. North Carolina credits the regular season to Brown and the Gator Bowl victory to Torbush.

== Schedule ==
Date	Time	Opponent	Rank	Site	TV	Result	Attendance	Source
September 6	12:00 p.m.	Indiana*	No. 7	Kenan Memorial Stadium; Chapel Hill, NC	ESPN2	W 23–6	57,800	
September 13	6:00 p.m.	No. 17 Stanford*	No. 7	Kenan Memorial Stadium; Chapel Hill, NC	ESPN2	W 28–17	57,800	
September 20	12:00 p.m.	at Maryland	No. 6	Byrd Stadium; College Park, MD	JPS	W 40–14	30,084	
September 27	12:00 p.m.	Virginia	No. 5	Kenan Memorial Stadium; Chapel Hill, NC (South's Oldest Rivalry)	ABC	W 48–20	57,800	
October 4	8:05 p.m.	at TCU*	No. 5	Amon G. Carter Stadium; Fort Worth, TX		W 31–10	29,415	
October 11	12:00 p.m.	Wake Forest	No. 5	Kenan Memorial Stadium; Chapel Hill, NC (rivalry)	JPS	W 30–12	57,000	
October 18	6:00 p.m.	at NC State	No. 4	Carter–Finley Stadium; Raleigh, NC (rivalry)	ESPN2	W 20–7	51,500	
October 30	8:00 p.m.	at Georgia Tech	No. 5	Bobby Dodd Stadium; Atlanta, GA	ESPN	W 16–13	45,126	
November 8	7:30 p.m.	No. 3 Florida State	No. 5	Kenan Memorial Stadium; Chapel Hill, NC (College GameDay)	ESPN	L 3–20	62,000	
November 15	3:30 p.m.	at Clemson	No. 8	Memorial Stadium; Clemson, SC	ABC	W 17–10	71,514	
November 22	12:00 p.m.	Duke	No. 8	Kenan Memorial Stadium; Chapel Hill, NC (Victory Bell)	JPS	W 50–14	53,500	
January 1, 1998	12:30 p.m.	vs. Virginia Tech*	No. 7	Alltel Stadium; Jacksonville, FL (Gator Bowl)	NBC	W 42–3	54,116	
*Non-conference game; Rankings from AP Poll released prior to the game; All times are in Eastern time

== Roster ==
1997 North Carolina Tar Heels football team roster
Players
Coaches
Offense

Pos.	#	Name	Class
WR	4	Octavus Barnes	Sr
QB	15	Chris Keldorf	Sr
WR	18	Na Brown	Jr
WR	23	LC Stevens	Jr
OT	77	John Surigao	Jr
RB	27	Jonathan Linton	Sr
OT	51	Mike Baxter	Sr
G	63	Mike Hobgood	Sr
C	64	Jeff Saturday	Sr
TE	82	Alge Crumpler	So
TE	86	Ebenezer Ekuban	Jr

Defense

Pos.	#	Name	Class
S	2	Omar Brown	Sr
S	3	Greg Williams	Sr
LB	9	Keith Newman	Jr
CB	29	Robert Williams	Jr
CB	31	Dré Bly	So
LB	41	Brian Simmons	Sr
LB	53	Kivuusama Mays	Sr
DT	84	Nate Hobgood-Chittick	Sr
DT	85	Chris Mintz	So
DE	87	Greg Ellis	Sr
DT	90	Vonnie Holliday	Sr
DE	91	Mike Pringley	Jr
DE	96	Russell Davis	Jr

Special teams

Pos.	#	Name	Class
P	23	Brian Schmitz	So
K	37	Josh McGee	So

Head coach

- Mack Brown

Coordinators/assistant coaches

Legend

- (C) Team captain
- (S) Suspended
- (I) Ineligible
- Injured
- Redshirt

== Rankings ==
Ranking movements Legend: ██ Increase in ranking ██ Decrease in ranking ( ) = First-place votes
	Week																	
Poll	Pre	1	2	3	4	5	6	7	8	9	10	11	12	13	14	15	16	Final
AP	7 (4)	7 (4)	7 (4)	7 (2)	6 (1)	5 (2)	5 (2)	5 (2)	4 (2)	4 (2)	5 (2)	5 (2)	8	8	8	7	7	6
Coaches Poll	8 (1)	8 (1)	8 (1)	8 (1)	7 (1)	5 (1)	5 (1)	5 (1)	4 (1)	4 (1)	5	5	9	8	6	5	5	4

== Game summaries ==
=== Vs. Virginia Tech (Gator Bowl) ===
North Carolina vs. Virginia Tech
(Gator Bowl)

Team	1	2	3	4	Total
• No. 7 Tar Heels	16	6	6	14	42
Hokies	0	0	3	0	3

- Date: January 1, 1998
- Location: Alltel Stadium
  Jacksonville, FL
- Game attendance: 54,116
- TV announcers (NBC): Charlie Jones (play–by–play), Bob Trumpy (analyst) and John Dockery (sideline)

== Players in the 1998 NFL draft ==
Player	Position	Round	Pick	NFL club	Ref
Greg Ellis	DE	1	8	Dallas Cowboys	
Brian Simmons	LB	1	17	Cincinnati Bengals	
Vonnie Holliday	DE	1	19	Green Bay Packers	
Omar Brown	S	4	103	Atlanta Falcons	
Kivuusama Mays	LB	4	110	Minnesota Vikings	
Robert Williams	CB	5	128	Kansas City Chiefs	
Jonathan Linton	FB	5	131	Buffalo Bills	
