= 1997 Georgia Tech Yellow Jackets football team =

American college football season

1997 Georgia Tech Yellow Jackets football

Carquest Bowl champion

Carquest Bowl, W 35–30 vs. West Virginia
- Conference: Atlantic Coast Conference
- Record: 7–5 (5–3 ACC)
- Head coach: George O'Leary (4th season)
- Offensive coordinator: Ralph Friedgen (6th season)
- Defensive coordinator: Dave Huxtable (2nd season)
- Home stadium: Bobby Dodd Stadium

1997 Atlantic Coast Conference football standings
	Conf.			Overall
Team	W		L	W		L
No. 3 Florida State $	8	–	0	11	–	1
No. 6 North Carolina	7	–	1	11	–	1
Virginia	5	–	3	7	–	4
No. 25 Georgia Tech	5	–	3	7	–	5
Clemson	4	–	4	7	–	5
NC State	3	–	5	6	–	5
Wake Forest	3	–	5	5	–	6
Maryland	1	–	7	2	–	9
Duke	0	–	8	2	–	9
$ – Conference champion; Rankings from AP Poll

The 1997 Georgia Tech Yellow Jackets football team represented Georgia Tech as member of the Atlantic Coast Conference (ACC) during the 1997 NCAA Division I-A football season. Led by fourth-year head coach George O'Leary, the Yellow Jackets compiled an overall record of 7–5 with a mark of 5–3 in conference play, tying for third place in the ACC. Georgia Tech was invited to the Carquest Bowl, where the Yellow Jackets defeated West Virginia. The team played home games at Bobby Dodd Stadium in Atlanta.

== Schedule ==
Date	Time	Opponent	Rank	Site	TV	Result	Attendance	Source
September 6	2:30 pm	at No. 11 Notre Dame*		Notre Dame Stadium; Notre Dame, IN (rivalry)	NBC	L 13–17	80,225	
September 20	6:30 pm	at Wake Forest		Groves Stadium; Winston-Salem, NC		W 28–26	22,832	
September 27	7:30 pm	No. 17 Clemson		Bobby Dodd Stadium; Atlanta, GA (rivalry)	ESPN	W 23–20	45,275	
October 4	3:30 pm	at Boston College*		Alumni Stadium; Chestnut Hill, MA	CBS	W 42–14	38,462	
October 11	3:30 pm	NC State	No. 25	Bobby Dodd Stadium; Atlanta, GA	ABC	W 27–17	44,195	
October 18	3:30 pm	at No. 3 Florida State	No. 21	Doak Campbell Stadium; Tallahassee, FL	ABC	L 0–38	78,157	
October 30	8:00 pm	No. 5 North Carolina		Bobby Dodd Stadium; Atlanta, GA	ESPN	L 13–16	45,126	
November 8	3:30 pm	at Virginia		Scott Stadium; Charlottesville, VA	ABC	L 31–35	41,000	
November 15	1:30 pm	at Duke		Wallace Wade Stadium; Durham, NC		W 41–38	22,638	
November 22	3:30 pm	Maryland		Bobby Dodd Stadium; Atlanta, GA	ABC	W 37–18	35,267	
November 29	1:00 pm	No. 14 Georgia*		Bobby Dodd Stadium; Atlanta, GA (Clean, Old-Fashioned Hate)	ABC	L 24–27	46,015	
December 29	7:30 pm	vs. West Virginia*		Pro Player Stadium; Miami Gardens, FL (Carquest Bowl)	TBS	W 35–30	28,262	
*Non-conference game; Rankings from AP Poll released prior to the game; All times are in Eastern time

== Rankings ==
Ranking movements Legend: ██ Increase in ranking ██ Decrease in ranking — = Not ranked
	Week																	
Poll	Pre	1	2	3	4	5	6	7	8	9	10	11	12	13	14	15	16	Final
AP	—	—	—	—	—	—	—	25	21	—	—	—	—	—	—	—	—	25
Coaches	—		—	—	—	—	—	—	25	—	—	—	—	—	—	—	—	—
