= 1997 Florida State Seminoles football team =

American college football season

1997 Florida State Seminoles football

ACC champion Sugar Bowl champion

Sugar Bowl, W 31–14 vs. Ohio State
- Conference: Atlantic Coast Conference

Ranking
- Coaches: No. 3
- AP: No. 3
- Record: 11–1 (8–0 ACC)
- Head coach: Bobby Bowden (22nd season)
- Offensive coordinator: Mark Richt (4th season)
- Offensive scheme: Pro-style
- Defensive coordinator: Mickey Andrews (14th season)
- Base defense: 4–3
- Captains: Kevin Long; Daryl Bush; Shevin Smith
- Home stadium: Doak Campbell Stadium

1997 Atlantic Coast Conference football standings
	Conf.			Overall
Team	W		L	W		L
No. 3 Florida State $	8	–	0	11	–	1
No. 6 North Carolina	7	–	1	11	–	1
Virginia	5	–	3	7	–	4
No. 25 Georgia Tech	5	–	3	7	–	5
Clemson	4	–	4	7	–	5
NC State	3	–	5	6	–	5
Wake Forest	3	–	5	5	–	6
Maryland	1	–	7	2	–	9
Duke	0	–	8	2	–	9
$ – Conference champion; Rankings from AP Poll

The 1997 Florida State Seminoles football team represented the Florida State University as a member of the Atlantic Coast Conference (ACC) during the 1997 NCAA Division I-A football season. Led by 22nd-year head coach Bobby Bowden, the Seminoles compiled an overall record of 11–1 with a mark of 8–0 in conference play, winning the ACC title. Florida State was invited to the Sugar Bowl, where the Seminoles defeated Ohio State. The team played home games at Doak Campbell Stadium in Tallahassee, Florida.

== Schedule ==
Date	Time	Opponent	Rank	Site	TV	Result	Attendance	Source
September 6	3:30 p.m.	at No. 23 USC*	No. 5	Los Angeles Memorial Coliseum; Los Angeles, CA	ABC	W 14–7	72,783	
September 13	3:30 p.m.	Maryland	No. 5	Doak Campbell Stadium; Tallahassee, FL	ABC	W 50–7	72,238	
September 20	3:30 p.m.	at No. 16 Clemson	No. 5	Memorial Stadium; Clemson, SC (rivalry)	ABC	W 35–28	80,939	
October 4	12:00 p.m.	Miami (FL)*	No. 4	Doak Campbell Stadium; Tallahassee, FL (rivalry)	ABC	W 47–0	80,165	
October 11	7:00 p.m.	at Duke	No. 4	Wallace Wade Stadium; Durham, NC	PPV	W 51–27	21,557	
October 18	3:30 p.m.	No. 21 Georgia Tech	No. 3	Doak Campbell Stadium; Tallahassee, FL	ABC	W 38–0	78,157	
October 25	7:00 p.m.	at Virginia	No. 3	Scott Stadium; Charlottesville, VA (Jefferson–Eppes Trophy)	ESPN	W 47–21	45,300	
November 1	3:30 p.m.	NC State^{†}	No. 3	Doak Campbell Stadium; Tallahassee, FL	ABC	W 48–35	71,415	
November 8	7:30 p.m.	at No. 5 North Carolina	No. 3	Kenan Memorial Stadium; Chapel Hill, NC (College GameDay)	ESPN	W 20–3	62,000	
November 15	12:00 p.m.	Wake Forest	No. 2	Doak Campbell Stadium; Tallahassee, FL	JPS	W 58–7	70,026	
November 22	3:30 p.m.	at No. 10 Florida*	No. 2	Ben Hill Griffin Stadium; Gainesville, FL (rivalry, College GameDay)	CBS	L 29–32	85,677	
January 1	8:00 p.m.	vs. No. 9 Ohio State*	No. 4	Louisiana Superdome; New Orleans, LA (Sugar Bowl)	ABC	W 31–14	67,289	
*Non-conference game; ^{†}Homecoming; Rankings from AP Poll released prior to the game; All times are in Eastern time

== Rankings ==
Ranking movements Legend: ██ Increase in ranking ██ Decrease in ranking ( ) = First-place votes
	Week																	
Poll	Pre	1	2	3	4	5	6	7	8	9	10	11	12	13	14	15	16	Final
AP	3 (7)	3 (6)	5 (6)	5 (4)	5 (1)	4 (1)	4 (1)	4 (1)	3 (3)	3 (9)	3 (8)	3 (5)	2 (23)	2 (24)	5	4	4	3
Coaches	4 (3)		5 (3)	6 (3)	5 (2)	4 (1)	4	4	3 (1)	3 (3)	3 (3)	2 (2)	1 (26)	1 (29)	5	4	4	3

== Personnel ==
=== Roster ===
1997 Florida State Seminoles football team roster
Players
Coaches
Offense

Pos.	#	Name	Class
WR	7	Laveranues Coles	So
WR	9	Peter Warrick	So
QB	10	Dan Kendra	So
QB	12	Thad Busby	Sr
WR	13	Snoop Minnis	Fr
QB	16	Chris Weinke	Fr
WR	19	E. G. Green	Sr
RB	23	Travis Minor	Fr
RB	33	Dee Feaster	Jr
C	51	Kevin Long	Sr
G	68	Jason Whitaker	So
OT	70	Tra Thomas	Sr
G	78	Donald Heaven	Fr
TE	81	Melvin Pearsall	Sr

Defense

Pos.	#	Name	Class
LB	1	Sam Cowart	Sr
CB	2	Samari Rolle	Sr
DB	6	Derrick Gibson	Fr
FS	11	Dexter Jackson	Jr
CB	15	Mario Edwards	Jr
FS	16	Sean Key	Jr
CB	27	Tay Cody	Fr
LB	29	Tommy Polley	Fr
DB	30	Shevin Smith	Sr
LB	40	Lamont Green	Jr
LB	44	Daryl Bush	Sr
DL	53	Corey Simon	So
DL	85	Andre Wadsworth	Sr
DE	90	Greg Spires	Sr

Special teams

Pos.	#	Name	Class
K	38	Sebastian Janikowski	Fr
K	43	Bill Gramatica	Fr
P	47	Keith Cottrell	Fr

Head coach

- Bobby Bowden

Coordinators/assistant coaches

Legend

- (C) Team captain
- (S) Suspended
- (I) Ineligible
- Injured
- Redshirt

=== Depth chart ===
Defense

FS
Dexter Jackson
Todd Frier
Robert Hammond

MIKE	WILL	SAM
Sam Cowart; Theon Rackley	Daryl Bush	Lamont Green; Deon Humphrey
Tommy Polley	Bobby Rhodes	Olayemi Okegbola
Kwaesi Palmer	Hank Grant	Jean Jeune

ROVER
Shevin Smith
Derrick Gibson
Sean Key

CB
Samari Rolle
Troy Saunders
Abdual Howard

DE	DT	DT	DE
Greg Spires	Jerry Johnson	Julian Pittman	Andre Wadsworth
Tony Bryant	Bryne Monroe	Larry Smith	Roland Seymour
Sean Mitchell	David Tulloch	Corey Simon	Chris Walker

CB
Dexter Jackson
Mario Edwards
⋅

Offense

WR
E.G. Green
Damien Harrell
Jason Floyd

LT	LG	C	RG	RT
Tra Thomas	Jason Whitaker	Kevin Long	Donald Heaven	Ross Brannon
Tarlos Crummitie	Justin Amman	Jared Moon	Otis Duhart	Ronald Boldin
Chris Korb	Jerry Carmichael	Eric Thomas	Jeremy Brett	Tarlos Thomas

TE
Melvin Pearsall
Myron Jackson
Pooh Bear Williams
Stacy Davis

WR
Laveranues Coles
Ron Dugans
Germaine Stringer

QB
Thad Busby
Chris Weinke
Dan Kendra

RB
Travis Minor
Dee Feaster
Jeff Chaney
Davy Ford

FB
Lamar Glenn
Damon Carroll
Khalid Abdullah

Special teams
PK Sebastian Janikowski
P Keith Cottrell
