= 1998 Las Vegas Bowl =

- 7th Las Vegas Bowl
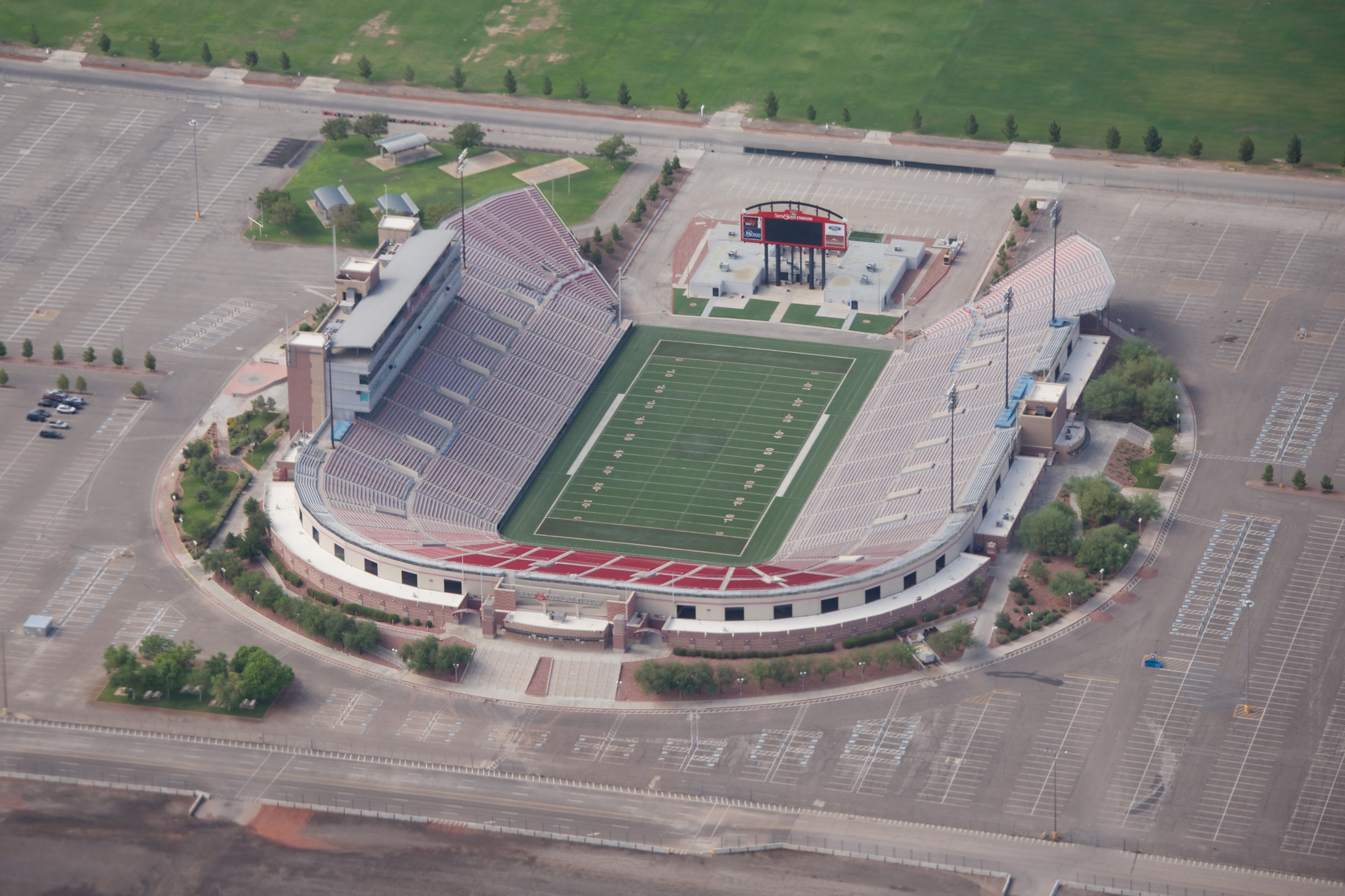
- Sam Boyd Stadium in Whitney, Nevada, hosted the Las Vegas Bowl.
San Diego State Aztecs	North Carolina Tar Heels
(7–4)	(6–5)
WAC	ACC
13	20
Head coach: Ted Tollner	Head coach: Carl Torbush
	1	2	3	4	Total
San Diego State	7	3	0	3	13
North Carolina	12	8	0	0	20
- Date: December 19, 1998
- Season: 1998
- Stadium: Sam Boyd Stadium
- Location: Whitney, Nevada
- MVP: Ronald Curry (QB, North Carolina)
- Payout: US$750,000 per team

United States TV coverage
- Network: ESPN
- Announcers: Ron Franklin, Mike Gottfried

The 1998 Las Vegas Bowl was the seventh edition of the annual college football bowl game. It featured the San Diego State Aztecs, and the North Carolina Tar Heels. It remains the only bowl game in NCAA history where both of teams which participated in it started the season 0–3.

== Game summary ==
San Diego State scored first after receiver Lonny Mitchell recovered a San Diego State fumble and advanced it 60 yards for a touchdown, putting the Aztecs up 7-0. North Carolina got back into the game with field goals of 32 and 23 yards from Josh McGee, to pull the Tar Heels to within 7-6. Quarterback Ronald Curry took off on a 48-yard touchdown run, but a missed extra point left the score at 12-7, North Carolina.

In the second quarter, safety David Bomar recovered a blocked punt in the end zone for a touchdown, and a two-point conversion made the score 20-7 North Carolina. North Carolina would not score for the rest of the game. Before halftime, Nate Tandberg kicked a 32-yard field goal to pull SDSU to within 20-10. Later in the fourth quarter, he drilled another 38-yard field goal, to make it 20-13 UNC. North Carolina would hold on to win the game by that margin.
