= 1998 North Carolina Tar Heels football team =

American college football season

1998 North Carolina Tar Heels football

Las Vegas Bowl champion

Las Vegas Bowl, W 20–13 vs. San Diego State
- Conference: Atlantic Coast Conference
- Record: 7–5 (5–3 ACC)
- Head coach: Carl Torbush (1st season)
- Offensive coordinator: Darrell Moody (1st season)
- Offensive scheme: Pro-style
- Base defense: 4–3
- Captains: Na Brown; Ebenezer Ekuban; Deon Dyer; Keith Newman; Brandon Spoon
- Home stadium: Kenan Memorial Stadium

1998 Atlantic Coast Conference football standings
	Conf.			Overall
Team	W		L	W		L
No. 3 Florida State $+	7	–	1	11	–	2
No. 9 Georgia Tech +	7	–	1	10	–	2
No. 18 Virginia	6	–	2	9	–	3
North Carolina	5	–	3	7	–	5
NC State	5	–	3	7	–	5
Duke	2	–	6	4	–	7
Wake Forest	2	–	6	3	–	8
Clemson	1	–	7	3	–	8
Maryland	1	–	7	3	–	8
$ – BCS representative as conference champion; + – Conference co-champions; Rankings from AP Poll

The 1998 North Carolina Tar Heels football team represented the University of North Carolina at Chapel Hill during the 1998 NCAA Division I-A football season. The Tar Heels played their home games at Kenan Memorial Stadium in Chapel Hill, North Carolina and competed in the Atlantic Coast Conference. The team was led by head coach Carl Torbush.

== Schedule ==
Date	Time	Opponent	Rank	Site	TV	Result	Attendance	Source
September 5	6:00 p.m.	Miami (OH)*	No. 12	Kenan Memorial Stadium; Chapel Hill, NC		L 10–13	60,100	
September 19	6:30 p.m.	at Stanford*		Stanford Stadium (I); Stanford, CA	FSN	L 34–37	34,198	
September 26	7:30 p.m.	Georgia Tech		Kenan Memorial Stadium; Chapel Hill, NC	ESPN	L 21–43	59,500	
October 3	3:30 p.m.	Clemson		Kenan Memorial Stadium; Chapel Hill, NC	ABC	W 21–14	56,650	
October 10	1:30 p.m.	Pittsburgh*		Kenan Memorial Stadium; Chapel Hill, NC		W 29–10	50,900	
October 24	12:00 p.m.	at Wake Forest		Groves Stadium (II); Winston Salem, NC (rivalry)	JPS	W 38–31	25,841	
October 31	7:30 p.m.	at No. 5 Florida State		Doak Campbell Stadium; Tallahassee, FL	ESPN	L 13–39	80,050	
November 7	12:00 p.m.	Maryland^{†}		Kenan Memorial Stadium; Chapel Hill, NC	ESPN2	W 24–13	51,200	
November 14	3:30 p.m.	at No. 21 Virginia		Scott Stadium; Charlottesville, VA (South's Oldest Rivalry)	ABC	L 13–30	47,000	
November 21	12:00 p.m.	at Duke		Wallace Wade Stadium; Durham, NC (Victory Bell)	JPS	W 28–6	25,740	
November 28	1:00 p.m.	vs. NC State		Ericsson Stadium; Charlotte, NC (rivalry)	ABC	W 37–34 ^{OT}	68,797	
December 19	6:00 p.m.	vs. San Diego State*		Sam Boyd Stadium; Whitney, NV (Las Vegas Bowl)	ESPN2	W 20–13	21,249	
*Non-conference game; ^{†}Homecoming; Rankings from AP Poll released prior to the game; All times are in Eastern time

== Rankings ==
Ranking movements Legend: ██ Increase in ranking ██ Decrease in ranking — = Not ranked
	Week															
Poll	Pre	1	2	3	4	5	6	7	8	9	10	11	12	13	14	Final
AP	12	—	—	—	—	—	—	—	—	—	—	—	—	—	—	—
Coaches	11	24	—	—	—	—	—	—	—	—	—	—	—	—	—	—
BCS	Not released								—	—	—	—	—	—	—	Not released

== Roster ==
1998 North Carolina Tar Heels football team roster
Players
Coaches
Offense

Pos.	#	Name	Class
WR	6	Danny Davis	Fr
QB	13	Ronald Curry	Fr
QB	15	Luke Huard	Fr
QB	16	Bill Bigham	So
WR	18	Na Brown	Sr
FB	38	Deon Dyer	Jr
TE	82	Alge Crumpler	So

Defense

Pos.	#	Name	Class
LB	9	Keith Newman	Sr
CB	11	Anthony Anderson	Fr
CB	27	Jason Horton	Fr
LB	30	David Thornton	So
CB	31	Dre Bly	Jr
LB	41	Quincy Monk	Fr
LB	44	Brandon Spoon	Jr
DE	49	Julius Peppers	Fr
DE	86	Ebenezer Ekuban	Sr
DT	87	Ryan Sims	Fr
DE	91	Mike Pringley	Sr
DE	96	Russell Davis	Jr

Special teams

Pos.	#	Name	Class
K	92	Jeff Reed	So

Head coach

- Carl Torbush

Coordinators/assistant coaches

Legend

- (C) Team captain
- (S) Suspended
- (I) Ineligible
- Injured
- Redshirt

Roster

== Game summaries ==
=== Miami (OH) ===
	1	2	3	4	Total
RedHawks					0
No. 12 Tar Heels					0

=== at Stanford ===
	1	2	3	4	Total
Tar Heels					0
Cardinal					0

=== Georgia Tech ===
	1	2	3	4	Total
Yellow Jackets					0
Tar Heels					0

=== Clemson ===
	1	2	3	4	Total
Tigers					0
Tar Heels					0

=== Pittsburgh ===
	1	2	3	4	Total
Panthers					0
Tar Heels					0

=== at Wake Forest ===
	1	2	3	4	Total
Tar Heels					0
Demon Deacons					0

=== at No. 5 Florida State ===
	1	2	3	4	Total
Tar Heels					0
No. 5 Seminoles					0

=== Maryland ===
	1	2	3	4	Total
Terrapins					0
Tar Heels					0

=== at No. 21 Virginia (South's Oldest Rivalry) ===
	1	2	3	4	Total
Tar Heels					0
No. 21 Cavaliers					0

=== at Duke (Victory Bell) ===
	1	2	3	4	Total
Tar Heels					0
Blue Devils					0

=== vs. NC State ===
	1	2	3	4	Total
Wolfpack					0
Tar Heels					0

=== vs. San Diego State (Las Vegas Bowl) ===
	1	2	3	4	Total
Aztecs					0
Tar Heels					0
