= 1997 Gator Bowl =

1997 Toyota Gator Bowl
- 52nd Gator Bowl
| North Carolina Tar Heels | West Virginia Mountaineers |
| (9–2) | (8–3) |
| ACC | Big East |
| 20 | 13 |
| Head coach: Mack Brown | Head coach: Don Nehlen |
| AP / Coaches / BA; 12 / 13 / 12 | AP / Coaches / BA; 25 / 25 / 25 |
| | 1 | 2 | 3 | 4 | Total |
|---|---|---|---|---|---|
| North Carolina | 0 | 17 | 3 | 0 | 20 |
| West Virginia | 0 | 3 | 7 | 3 | 13 |
- Date: January 1, 1997
- Season: 1996
- Stadium: Alltel Stadium
- Location: Jacksonville, Florida
- MVP: Oscar Davenport, QB (North Carolina); David Saunders, WR (West Virginia)
- Referee: James Sprenger (Pac-10)
- Attendance: 52,103

United States TV coverage
- Network: NBC
- Announcers: Don Criqui & Bob Trumpy

The 1997 Gator Bowl was a college football postseason bowl game between the North Carolina Tar Heels and the West Virginia Mountaineers.

== Background ==
North Carolina finished 2nd in the Atlantic Coast Conference to undefeated Florida State. Meanwhile, after Virginia Tech, Miami & Syracuse all finished tied for first in the Big East Conference, West Virginia was slated to play in the Gator Bowl. This was North Carolina's first since Gator Bowl since 1993, and the first for the Mountaineers since 1989. North Carolina was trying to win their first Gator Bowl since 1981 while West Virginia was trying to break their five-game bowl losing streak and win their first Gator Bowl.

== Game summary ==
After a scoreless first quarter, 20 total points would be scored in the second quarter, 17 of them by the Tar Heels. It started when Oscar Davenport threw an 18-yard pass to Octavus Barnes in the back corner of the end zone to give the Tar Heels a 7–0 lead with 13:05 remaining in the half. The Tar Heels added on to the lead with a field goal over two minutes later. The Mountaineers responded with a field goal of their own with 2:24 remaining, but the Tar Heels scored on a Davenport run with 1:15 remaining to close out the scoring and give them a 17–3 lead. West Virginia scored on a touchdown pass to make it 17–10, but a UNC field goal by McGee made it 20–10 going into the final quarter. A field goal by the Mountaineers made it 20–13, as the Mountaineers had one last chance to tie it late, in UNC territory with two minutes remaining. But on 4th and 6 at the 25, the Mountaineers were stopped short as the Tar Heels hung on to win. Dré Bly had two interceptions as the Tar Heels forced four turnovers. Davenport went 14-of-26 for 175 yards and 1 touchdown. In a losing effort for the Mountaineers, David Saunders caught 9 passes for 130 yards.

== Aftermath ==
The Mountaineers would return to the Gator Bowl in 2004. North Carolina would return to the Gator Bowl the following year.

== Statistics ==
| Statistics | North Carolina | West Virginia |
|---|---|---|
| First downs | 21 | 19 |
| Yards rushing | 114 | 66 |
| Yards passing | 175 | 197 |
| Total yards | 289 | 263 |
| Punts-Average | 7-38.3 | 3-41.0 |
| Fumbles-Lost | 3-1 | 1-1 |
| Interceptions | 0 | 3 |
| Penalties-Yards | 9-63 | 4-52 |
