= 1998 Pittsburgh Steelers season =

Pittsburgh Steelers 66th US football season

- Owner: The Rooney Family
- General manager: Tom Donahoe
- Head coach: Bill Cowher
- Home stadium: Three Rivers Stadium

Results
- Record: 7–9
- Division place: 3rd AFC Central
- Playoffs: Did not qualify
- All-Pros: Dermontti Dawson (1st team)
- Pro Bowlers: C Dermontti Dawson
- Team MVP: Levon Kirkland
- Team ROY: Alan Faneca

The 1998 Pittsburgh Steelers season was the franchise's 66th season as a professional sports franchise and as a member of the National Football League (NFL).

This season marked the first time since the 1991 season that the Steelers failed to make the playoffs. Pittsburgh finished 7–9 after starting the season 5–2, losing their last five games to lose a spot in the playoffs. It was Bill Cowher's first losing record as head coach of the Steelers.

The season was marked by a controversial ending to the team's Thanksgiving Day game against the Detroit Lions, where Jerome Bettis claimed he called the coin toss in overtime as "tails" although referee Phil Luckett heard "heads." The Lions won 19–16 and started the Steelers' losing streak to finish the season.

The inconsistent play of Kordell Stewart was cited as another conflict, as the fans slowly began to turn on him. After their 11–5 1997 season, Pittsburgh lost two key offensive components: Chan Gailey, the offensive coordinator who went on to become head coach of the Dallas Cowboys, and their leading receiver, Yancey Thigpen, a Pro Bowler for Pittsburgh in 1997, who joined the Tennessee Oilers.

== Offseason ==
Additions	Subtractions
G Roger Duffy (Jets)	WR Yancey Thigpen (Oilers)
S Bo Orlando (Bengals)	T John Jackson (Chargers)

=== NFL draft ===
1998 Pittsburgh Steelers draft
Round	Pick	Player	Position	College	Notes
1	26	Alan Faneca * ^{†}	Guard	LSU	
2	41	Jeremy Staat	Defensive end	Arizona State	
3	66	Chris Conrad	Tackle	Fresno State	
3	92	Hines Ward *	Wide receiver	Georgia	
4	117	Deshea Townsend	Cornerback	Alabama	
4	123	Carlos King	Running back	NC State	
5	137	Jason Simmons	Safety	Arizona State	from Atlanta
6	178	Chris Fuamatu-Maʻafala	Fullback	Utah	
6	186	Ryan Olson	Defensive tackle	Colorado	
7	221	Angel Rubio	Defensive tackle	SE Missouri State	
Made roster † Pro Football Hall of Fame * Made at least one Pro Bowl during career

=== Undrafted free agents ===
1998 undrafted free agents of note
Player	Position	College
Matt Cushing	Tight end	Illinois
Aaron Delatorre	Defensive lineman	Stephen F. Austin
Mike Evans	Offensive lineman	Mercyhurst
Pete Gonzalez	Quarterback	Pittsburgh
Matt Harper	Defensive end	TCU
John Jenkins	Safety	Pittsburgh

== Personnel ==
=== Staff ===
1998 Pittsburgh Steelers staff
Front office: President – Daniel M. Rooney; Vice president – John R. McGinley; Vice president – Arthur J. Rooney, Jr.; Vice president and general counsel – Arthur J. Rooney II; Administration advisor – Chuck Noll; Director of business – Mark Hart; Business relations coordinator – Dan Ferens; Business accounting coordinator – Jim Ellenberger; Office/ticket coordinator – Geraldine Glenn; Communications coordinator – Ron Wahl; Public relations/media manager – David Lockett; Marketing coordinator – Mark Fuhrman; Merchandising manager – Tim Carey; Assistant marketing manager – Lynne Molyneaux; Marketing assistant – Jill Sklar; Ticket manager – Brian Bonifate; Football operations; Director of football operations – Tom Donahoe; Personnel staff; Pro personnel coordinator – Charles Bailey; College scouting coordinator – Max McCartney; College scout – Mark Gorscak; College scout – Phil Kreidler; College scout – Bob Lane; College scout – Dan Rooney; College scout – Bill Scheider; Head coaches: Head coach – Bill Cowher; Offensive coaches: Offensive coordinator – Ray Sherman; Running backs – Dick Hoak; Wide receivers – David Culley; Tight ends – Mike Mularkey; Offensive line – Kent Stephenson	Defensive coaches: Defensive coordinator – Jim Haslett; Defensive line – John Mitchell; Linebackers – Mike Archer; Defensive backs – Tim Lewis; Special teams coaches: Special teams – Ron Zook; Administrative assistant – Lou Spanos; Strength and conditioning: Conditioning coordinator – Chet Fuhrman; Medical staff; Ophthalmologist – Dr. Randy Beatty; Physician, orthopedic – Dr. James P. Bradley; Neurological surgery consultant – Dr. Joseph Maroon; Physician, M.D. – Dr. Richard Rydze; Physician, consultant – Dr. Abraham J. Twerski; Physician, M.D. – Dr. Anthony P. Yates; Training staff; Head trainer – John Norwig; Assistant trainer – Rick Burkholder; Equipment manager – Rodgers Freyvogel; Field manager – Rich Baker; Field/equipment assistant – Paul Gallagher; Video coordinator – Bob McCartney; Player development coordinator – Anthony Griggs; Photographers – Mike Fabus, Bill Amatucci

Notable additions include Hines Ward, Alan Faneca and Deshea Townsend.

=== Roster ===
1998 Pittsburgh Steelers roster
Quarterbacks (QB): 7 Pete Gonzalez; 10 Kordell Stewart; 18 Mike Tomczak; Running backs (RB): 36 Jerome Bettis; 45 Chris Fuamatu-Maʻafala; 33 Richard Huntley; 35 Carlos King FB; 34 Tim Lester FB; 25 Fred McAfee; 38 Jon Witman FB; Wide receivers (WR): 89 Will Blackwell; 83 David Dunn; 88 Courtney Hawkins; 81 Charles Johnson; 15 Bobby Shaw; 86 Hines Ward; Tight ends (TE): 84 Harold Bishop; 87 Mark Bruener; 85 Mitch Lyons	Offensive linemen (OL): 78 Chris Conrad T; 63 Dermontti Dawson C; 62 Roger Duffy G; 65 Alan Faneca G; 68 Brenden Stai G; 67 Jamain Stephens T; 66 Jim Sweeney T; 77 Will Wolford T; Defensive linemen (DL): 98 Oliver Gibson NT; 76 Kevin Henry DE; 74 Nolan Harrison DE; 97 Rod Manuel DE; 71 Orpheus Roye DE; 94 Jeremy Staat DE; 93 Joel Steed NT	Linebackers (LB): 51 Carlos Emmons OLB; 57 John Fiala ILB; 92 Jason Gildon OLB; 50 Earl Holmes ILB; 54 Donta Jones ILB; 99 Levon Kirkland ILB; 56 Mike Vrabel OLB; Defensive backs (DB): 29 Lance Brown CB/S; 41 Lethon Flowers SS; 37 Carnell Lake CB; 24 Chris Oldham FS; 21 Bo Orlando FS; 39 Darren Perry FS; 23 Jason Simmons CB/S; 26 Deshea Townsend CB; 20 Dewayne Washington CB; Special teams (ST): 9 Norm Johnson K; 4 Josh Miller P; 60 Mark Rodenhauser LS	Practice squad: 22 DeAuntae Brown CB; 28 Terrance Joseph CB; 55 Ryan Olson LB; 64 Tony Orlandini T; 19 Shawn Scales WR; Reserve: 80 Jahine Arnold WR (IR); 82 Henry Bailey WR (IR); 30 Chad Scott CB (IR); 73 Justin Strzelczyk T (IR); Rookies in italics 53 active, 4 reserve, 5 practice squad

== Preseason ==
=== Schedule ===
Week	Date	Opponent	Result	Record	Venue
1	August 1	vs. Tampa Bay Buccaneers	L 6–30	0–1	Fawcett Stadium (Canton, Ohio)
2	August 8	Buffalo Bills	W 24–13	1–1	Three Rivers Stadium
3	August 14	at Philadelphia Eagles	L 17–21	1–2	Veterans Stadium
4	August 22	vs. Atlanta Falcons	W 28–22	2–2	Mountaineer Field (Morgantown, West Virginia)
5	August 29	Carolina Panthers	W 38–24	3–2	Three Rivers Stadium

== Regular season ==
=== Schedule ===
Week	Date	Opponent	Result	Record	Venue
1	September 6	at **Baltimore Ravens**	**W** 20–13	1–0	Ravens Stadium
2	September 13	Chicago Bears	**W** 17–12	2–0	Three Rivers Stadium
3	September 20	at Miami Dolphins	**L** 0–21	2–1	Pro Player Stadium
4	September 27	Seattle Seahawks	**W** 13–10	3–1	Three Rivers Stadium
5	Bye				
6	October 11	at **Cincinnati Bengals**	**L** 20–25	3–2	Cinergy Field
7	October 18	**Baltimore Ravens**	**W** 16–6	4–2	Three Rivers Stadium
8	October 26	at Kansas City Chiefs	**W** 20–13	5–2	Arrowhead Stadium
9	November 1	**Tennessee Oilers**	**L** 31–41	5–3	Three Rivers Stadium
10	November 9	Green Bay Packers	**W** 27–20	6–3	Three Rivers Stadium
11	November 15	at **Tennessee Oilers**	**L** 14–23	6–4	Vanderbilt Stadium
12	November 22	**Jacksonville Jaguars**	**W** 30–15	7–4	Three Rivers Stadium
13	November 26	at Detroit Lions	**L** 16–19 (OT)	7–5	Pontiac Silverdome
14	December 6	New England Patriots	**L** 9–23	7–6	Three Rivers Stadium
15	December 13	at Tampa Bay Buccaneers	**L** 3–16	7–7	Raymond James Stadium
16	December 20	**Cincinnati Bengals**	**L** 24–25	7–8	Three Rivers Stadium
17	December 28	at **Jacksonville Jaguars**	**L** 3–21	7–9	Alltel Stadium
Note: Intra-division opponents are in **bold** text.

=== Game summaries ===
==== Week 1 (Sunday September 6, 1998): at Baltimore Ravens ====
	1	2	3	4	Total
**Steelers**	3	0	10	7	**20**
Ravens	3	0	0	10	**13**

at Ravens Stadium, Baltimore, Maryland

- Game time: 1:00 pm EDT
- Game weather:
- Game attendance: 68,847
- Referee: Walt Coleman
- TV announcers: (CBS) Verne Lundquist (play by play), Randy Cross (color commentator), Michele Tafoya (sideline reporter)

Scoring drives:

- Pittsburgh – FG N. Johnson 27
- Baltimore – FG Stover 41
- Pittsburgh – FG N. Johnson 49
- Pittsburgh – Stewart 1 run (N. Johnson kick)
- Pittsburgh – C. Johnson 20 pass from Stewart (N. Johnson kick)
- Baltimore – FG Stover 25
- Baltimore – J. Lewis 64 pass from Zeier (Stover kick)

==== Week 2 (Sunday September 13, 1998): vs. Chicago Bears ====
	1	2	3	4	Total
Bears	0	9	0	3	**12**
**Steelers**	0	7	10	0	**17**

at Three Rivers Stadium, Pittsburgh, Pennsylvania

- Game time: 1:00 pm EDT
- Game weather: 84 °F (29 °C) (Sunny)
- Game attendance: 59,084
- Referee: Gerald Austin
- TV announcers: (FOX) Kenny Albert (play by play), Tim Green (color commentator), Dan Jiggetts (sideline reporter)

Scoring drives:

- Chicago – Engram 54 pass from Kramer (kick failed)
- Pittsburgh – Bettis 1 run (N. Johnson kick)
- Chicago – FG Jaeger 19
- Pittsburgh – FG N. Johnson 49
- Pittsburgh – Coleman 13 pass from Stewart (N. Johnson kick)
- Chicago – FG Jaeger 36

==== Week 3 (Sunday September 20, 1998): at Miami Dolphins ====
	1	2	3	4	Total
Steelers	0	0	0	0	**0**
**Dolphins**	0	14	7	0	**21**

at Pro Player Stadium, Miami, Florida

- Game time: 1:00 pm EDT
- Game weather:
- Game attendance: 73,748
- Referee: Bill Carollo
- TV announcers: (CBS) Verne Lundquist (play by play), Randy Cross (color commentator), and Michele Tafoya (sideline reporter)

Scoring drives:

- Miami – Abdul-Jabbar 3 run (Mare kick)
- Miami – L. Thomas 8 pass from Marino (Mare kick)
- Miami – Z. Thomas 17 interception return (Mare kick)

==== Week 4 (Sunday September 27, 1998): vs. Seattle Seahawks ====
	1	2	3	4	Total
Seahawks	0	7	3	0	**10**
**Steelers**	3	7	3	0	**13**

at Three Rivers Stadium, Pittsburgh, Pennsylvania

- Game time: 4:05 pm EDT
- Game weather: 83 °F (28 °C) (Partly sunny)
- Game attendance: 58,413
- Referee: Johnny Grier
- TV announcers: (CBS) Kevin Harlan (play by play), Sam Wyche (color commentator)

Scoring drives:

- Pittsburgh – FG N. Johnson 33
- Seattle – Fauria 14 pass from Moon (Peterson kick)
- Pittsburgh – Fuamatu-Ma'afala 10 run (N. Johnson kick)
- Pittsburgh – FG N. Johnson 25
- Seattle – FG Peterson 47

==== Week 6 (Sunday October 11, 1998): at Cincinnati Bengals ====
	1	2	3	4	Total
Steelers	0	10	7	3	**20**
**Bengals**	0	9	3	13	**25**

at Cinergy Field, Cincinnati

- Game time: 1:00 pm EDT
- Game weather:
- Game attendance: 59,979
- Referee: Tom White
- TV announcers: (CBS) Don Criqui (play by play), Beasley Reece (color commentator)

Scoring drives:

- Pittsburgh – FG N. Johnson 40
- Pittsburgh – Bettis 13 run (N. Johnson kick)
- Cincinnati – FG Pelfrey 44
- Cincinnati – Scott 44 pass from O'Donnell (pass failed)
- Pittsburgh – Huntley 9 run (N. Johnson kick)
- Cincinnati – FG Pelfrey 48
- Cincinnati – Scott 30 pass from O'Donnell (pass failed)
- Pittsburgh – FG N. Johnson 40
- Cincinnati – Pickens 25 pass from O'Donnell (Pelfrey kick)

==== Week 7 (Sunday October 18, 1998): vs. Baltimore Ravens ====
	1	2	3	4	Total
Ravens	3	3	0	0	**6**
**Steelers**	3	0	7	6	**16**

at Three Rivers Stadium, Pittsburgh, Pennsylvania

- Game time: 1:00 pm EDT
- Game weather: 73 °F (23 °C) (Partly sunny)
- Game attendance: 58,620
- Referee: Ron Blum
- TV announcers: (CBS) Kevin Harlan (play by play), Sam Wyche (color commentator)

Scoring drives:

- Pittsburgh – FG N. Johnson 41
- Baltimore – FG Stover 41
- Baltimore – FG Stover 40
- Pittsburgh – C. Johnson 55 pass from Stewart (N. Johnson kick)
- Pittsburgh – FG N. Johnson 42
- Pittsburgh – FG N. Johnson 40

==== Week 8 (Monday October 26, 1998): at Kansas City Chiefs ====
	1	2	3	4	Total
**Steelers**	7	3	3	7	**20**
Chiefs	3	3	7	0	**13**

at Arrowhead Stadium, Kansas City, Missouri

- Game time: 8:20 pm EST
- Game weather:
- Game attendance: 79,431
- Referee: Bernie Kukar
- TV announcers: (ABC) Al Michaels (play by play), Dan Dierdorf & Boomer Esiason (color commentators), Lesley Visser (sideline reporter)

Scoring drives:

- Pittsburgh – McAfee recovered blocked punt in end zone (N. Johnson kick)
- Kansas City – FG Stoyanovich 20
- Kansas City – FG Stoyanovich 28
- Pittsburgh – FG N. Johnson 34
- Pittsburgh – FG N. Johnson 22
- Kansas City – Rison 2 pass from Grbac (Stoyanovich kick)
- Pittsburgh – C. Johnson 5 pass from Stewart (N. Johnson kick)

==== Week 9 (Sunday November 1, 1998): vs. Tennessee Oilers ====
	1	2	3	4	Total
**Oilers**	3	14	10	14	**41**
Steelers	0	7	0	24	**31**

at Three Rivers Stadium, Pittsburgh, Pennsylvania

- Game time: 1:00 pm EST
- Game weather: 55 °F (13 °C) (Cloudy)
- Game attendance: 58,222
- Referee: Mike Carey
- TV announcers: (CBS) Ian Eagle (play by play), Mark May (color commentator)

Scoring drives:

- Tennessee – FG Del Greco 43
- Tennessee – Wycheck 2 pass from McNair (Del Greco kick)
- Pittsburgh – C. Johnson 9 pass from Stewart (N. Johnson kick)
- Tennessee – Dyon 6 pass from McNair (Del Greco kick)
- Tennessee – FG Del Greco 32
- Tennessee – George 37 run (Del Greco kick)
- Tennessee – Davis 29 pass from McNair (Del Greco kick)
- Pittsburgh – Hawkins 3 pass from Stewart (C. Johnson pass from Stewart)
- Tennessee – Marts 27 interception return (Del Greco kick)
- Pittsburgh – C. Johnson 37 pass from Tomczak (C. Johnson pass from Tomczak)
- Pittsburgh – C. Johnson 2 pass from Tomczak (Blackwell pass from Tomczak)

==== Week 10 (Monday November 9, 1998): vs. Green Bay Packers ====
	1	2	3	4	Total
Packers	0	0	3	17	**20**
**Steelers**	14	10	3	0	**27**

at Three Rivers Stadium, Pittsburgh, Pennsylvania

- Game time: 8:20 pm EST
- Game weather: 44 °F (7 °C) (Mostly cloudy)
- Game attendance: 60,507
- Referee: Ron Winter
- TV announcers: (ABC) Al Michaels (play by play), Dan Dierdorf & Boomer Esiason (color commentators), Lesley Visser (sideline reporter)

Scoring drives:

- Pittsburgh – C. Johnson 8 pass from Stewart (N. Johnson kick)
- Pittsburgh – Stewart 1 run (N. Johnson kick)
- Pittsburgh – FG N. Johnson 45
- Pittsburgh – Fuamatu-Ma'afala 5 run (N. Johnson kick)
- Pittsburgh – FG N. Johnson 21
- Green Bay – FG Longwell 42
- Green Bay – McKenzie 88 fumble return (pass failed)
- Green Bay – Harris 2 run (Freeman pass from Favre)
- Green Bay – FG Longwell 37

==== Week 11 (Sunday November 15, 1998): at Tennessee Oilers ====
	1	2	3	4	Total
Steelers	0	14	0	0	**14**
**Oilers**	3	10	0	10	**23**

at Vanderbilt Stadium, Nashville, Tennessee

- Game time: 1:00 pm EST
- Game weather:
- Game attendance: 41,104
- Referee: Johnny Grier
- TV announcers: (CBS) Craig Bolerjack (play by play), John Dockery (color commentator)

Scoring drives:

- Tennessee – FG Del Greco 46
- Pittsburgh – Bruener 10 pass from Stewart (George kick)
- Tennessee – Davis 25 pass from McNair (Del Greco kick)
- Pittsburgh – Fuamatu-Ma'afala 26 pass from Stewart (George kick)
- Tennessee – FG Del Greco 24
- Tennessee – FG Del Greco 22
- Tennessee – Roan recovered fumble in end zone (Del Greco kick)

==== Week 12 (Sunday November 22, 1998): vs. Jacksonville Jaguars ====
	1	2	3	4	Total
Jaguars	0	0	7	8	**15**
**Steelers**	7	6	3	14	**30**

at Three Rivers Stadium, Pittsburgh, Pennsylvania

- Game time: 1:00 pm EST
- Game weather: 47 °F (8 °C) (Mostly sunny)
- Game attendance: 59,124
- Referee: Walt Coleman
- TV announcers: (CBS) Kevin Harlan (play by play), Sam Wyche (color commentator)

Scoring drives:

- Pittsburgh – Washington 52 interception return (N. Johnson kick)
- Pittsburgh – FG N. Johnson 38
- Pittsburgh – FG N. Johnson 29
- Jacksonville – Taylor 2 run (Hollis kick)
- Pittsburgh – FG N. Johnson 41
- Pittsburgh – Bruener 9 pass from Stewart (N. Johnson kick)
- Jacksonville – J. Smith 33 pass from Brunell (McCardell pass from Brunell)
- Pittsburgh – Washington 78 interception return (N. Johnson kick)

==== Week 13 (Thursday November 26, 1998): at Detroit Lions ====
	1	2	3	4	OT	Total
Steelers	0	6	7	3	0	**16**
**Lions**	0	3	3	10	3	**19**

at Pontiac Silverdome, Pontiac, Michigan

- Game time: 12:30 pm EST
- Game weather: Dome
- Game attendance: 78,139
- Referee: Phil Luckett
- TV announcers: (CBS) Greg Gumbel (play by play), Phil Simms (color commentator), Armen Keteyian (Sideline Reporter)

Scoring drives:

- Pittsburgh – FG N. Johnson 30
- Pittsburgh – FG N. Johnson 38
- Detroit – FG Hanson 45
- Pittsburgh – Blackwell 24 pass from Stewart (N. Johnson kick)
- Detroit – FG Hanson 52
- Detroit – Moore 21 pass from Batch (Hanson kick)
- Detroit – FG Hanson 35
- Pittsburgh – FG N. Johnson 25
- Detroit – FG Hanson 42

==== Week 14 (Sunday December 6, 1998): vs. New England Patriots ====
	1	2	3	4	Total
**Patriots**	3	10	0	10	**23**
Steelers	6	3	0	0	**9**

at Three Rivers Stadium, Pittsburgh, Pennsylvania

- Game time: 1:00 pm EST
- Game weather: 68 °F (20 °C) (Partly sunny)
- Game attendance: 58,632
- Referee: Dick Hantak
- TV announcers: (CBS) Verne Lundquist (play by play), Randy Cross (color commentator), and Michele Tafoya (sideline reporter)

Scoring drives:

- New England – FG Vinatieri 21
- New England – FG Vinatieri 29
- Pittsburgh – FG N. Johnson 49
- New England – Glenn 86 pass from Bledsoe (Vinatieri kick)
- Pittsburgh – FG N. Johnson 26
- Pittsburgh – FG N. Johnson 43
- New England – FG Vinatieri 35
- New England – Edwards 4 run (Vinatieri kick)

==== Week 15 (Sunday December 13, 1998): at Tampa Bay Buccaneers ====
	1	2	3	4	Total
Steelers	3	0	0	0	**3**
**Buccaneers**	3	3	7	3	**16**

at Raymond James Stadium, Tampa, Florida

- Game time: 1:00 pm EST
- Game weather:
- Game attendance: 65,335
- Referee: Tony Corrente
- TV announcers: (CBS) Verne Lundquist (play by play), Randy Cross (color commentator), and Michele Tafoya (sideline reporter)

Scoring drives:

- Pittsburgh – FG N. Johnson 27
- Tampa Bay – FG Husted 39
- Tampa Bay – FG Husted 37
- Tampa Bay – Alstott 3 run (Husted kick)
- Tampa Bay – FG Husted 21

==== Week 16 (Sunday December 20, 1998): vs. Cincinnati Bengals ====
	1	2	3	4	Total
**Bengals**	3	13	6	3	**25**
Steelers	0	7	14	3	**24**

at Three Rivers Stadium, Pittsburgh, Pennsylvania

- Game time: 1:00 pm EST
- Game weather: 42 °F (6 °C) (Cloudy)
- Game attendance: 52,017
- Referee: Bernie Kukar
- TV announcers: (CBS) Ian Eagle (play by play), Mark May (color commentator)

Scoring drives:

- Cincinnati – FG Pelfrey 33
- Cincinnati – Shade 55 fumble return (Pelfrey kick)
- Cincinnati – FG Pelfrey 37
- Pittsburgh – Lake 15 interception return (N. Johnson kick)
- Cincinnati – FG Pelfrey 43
- Pittsburgh – Oldham 54 fumble return (N. Johnson kick)
- Pittsburgh – Bettis 4 run (N. Johnson kick)
- Cincinnati – Scott 61 pass from Blake (bad snap)
- Pittsburgh – FG N. Johnson 22
- Cincinnati – FG Pelfrey 21

==== Week 17 (Monday December 28, 1998): at Jacksonville Jaguars ====
	1	2	3	4	Total
Steelers	0	3	0	0	**3**
**Jaguars**	0	14	7	0	**21**

at Alltel Stadium, Jacksonville, Florida

- Game time: 8:20 pm EST
- Game weather:
- Game attendance: 74,143
- Referee: Bill Carollo
- TV announcers: (ABC) Al Michaels (play by play), Dan Dierdorf & Boomer Esiason (color commentators), Lesley Visser (sideline reporter)

Scoring drives

- Pittsburgh – FG N. Johnson 24
- Jacksonville – Quinn 15 run (Hollis kick)
- Jacksonville – Taylor 9 pass from Quinn (Hollis kick)
- Jacksonville – Taylor 12 run (Hollis kick)

=== Standings ===
AFC Central
	W	L	T	PCT	PF	PA	STK
^{(3)} Jacksonville Jaguars	11	5	0	.688	392	338	W1
Tennessee Oilers	8	8	0	.500	330	320	L2
Pittsburgh Steelers	7	9	0	.438	263	303	L5
Baltimore Ravens	6	10	0	.375	269	335	W1
Cincinnati Bengals	3	13	0	.188	268	452	L1
