= Vili Maumau =

American football player (born 1975)

No. 79
- Position: Defensive tackle

Personal information
- Born: April 3, 1975 (age 51); Kolovai, Tonga
- Listed height: 6 ft 2 in (1.88 m)
- Listed weight: 302 lb (137 kg)

Career information
- High school: Saint Louis School (Honolulu, Hawaii, U.S.)
- College: Colorado
- NFL draft: 1998: 7th round, 196th overall pick

Career history
- Carolina Panthers (1998)*; Denver Broncos (1998–1999)*; Carolina Panthers (1999)
- * Offseason or practice squad member only

Awards and highlights
- Super Bowl champion (XXXIII)

Career NFL statistics
- Tackles: 1
- Stats at Pro Football Reference

Viliami Maumau (born April 3, 1975) is a Tongan-born former professional football player. Born in Kolovai, Tonga, he played as a defensive tackle for the University of Colorado and was a Third Team All Big 12 selection as a junior. Maumau attended St. Louis School in Honolulu and was a teammate of Olin Kreutz and Chris Fuamatu-Ma'afala. He was selected by the Carolina Panthers in the seventh round of the 1998 NFL draft. He also played one year of NFL football for the Panthers in 1999.
