= Andrew Le (chef) =

Vietnamese American chef

Andrew Le (c. 1984) is a Vietnamese American chef based in Honolulu, Hawaiʻi. Le was awarded the Honolulu Magazine's Hale ‘Aina Award for the "Restaurateur of the Year" in 2017. He was also named as a James Beard Foundation Award semifinalist in 2023 and 2024.

== Personal life ==
Le was born circa 1984 in Honolulu to Raymond and Loan Le, both of Vietnamese descent. Andrew has two older brothers - Anderson and Alex - and one younger sister - Allison. Fleeing the Vietnam War, his mother went into labor on a refugee plane headed toward Arkansas with Andrew's eldest brother causing the plane to make an emergency landing at Hickam Air Force Base. After Anderson's birth, his parents stayed in Hawaiʻi.

== Education ==
Le graduated from the Saint Louis School in Honolulu in 2001. After graduating high school, he moved to New York to attend The Culinary Institute of America, where he graduated in 2006.

== Career ==
After graduating from The Culinary Institute of America, Le moved back to Hawaiʻi and started working with Chef George Mavrothalassitis at his namesake restaurant, Chef Mavro. During his time at Chef Marvo, Le also was trained by James Beard Award semifinalist Chef Kevin Chong. Later on, Le became the Sous Chef at Chef Mavro.

In 2011, Le, with the help of Honolulu Magazine's dining editor Martha Cheng, launched several pop-up dinners and booths at farmers markets to test his restaurant idea for The Pig & The Lady.

In 2012, Le was named the Rising Star Chef awardee by StarChefs.com. Also around 2012–2013, Le went to study for seven months at the restaurant Rich Table, which is located in San Francisco and was also nominated in 2013 for the James Beard Best New Restaurant award.

In 2013, Le opened a brick and mortar location for The Pig & The Lady in Honolulu's Chinatown.

In 2015, Le filmed with Anthony Bourdain for Bourdain's series Parts Unknown.

In 2016, Le opened another restaurant in Ward Village, Honolulu called Piggy Smalls, which was a spin off of The Pig & The Lady. Piggy Smalls closed in February 2023 due to staff shortages caused by the COVID-19 pandemic.

In 2017, Le was awarded the Honolulu Magazine's Hale ‘Aina Award for the Restaurateur of the Year. In 2018, Le, along with chef Eddie Huang and chef Roy Choi, were flown out to Hollywood, California by Warner Bros. to cook a pop-up dinner to help promote the film release of Crazy Rich Asians. In 2019, Le opened a second location for The Pig & the Lady in Tokyo, Japan.

In January 2023, Le was named as a Hawaiʻi semifinalist for the 2023 James Beard Awards in the Outstanding Chef category. In March of that same year,The Pig & The Lady won Gold from Honolulu Magazine's Hale ‘Aina Award for best Vietnamese.

In January 2024, Le was a James Beard Award semifinalist for the category of "Best Chef: Northwest and Pacific." In that same year, The Pig & The Lady won Gold again from Honolulu Magazine's Hale ‘Aina Award for best Vietnamese.

In July 2025, Le closed his Chinatown restaurant and reopened shortly after in Kaimuki at the new Civil Beat building in October 2025
