= Saint Louis School =

Location
- 3142 Waialae Avenue; Honolulu, Hawaii 96816-1579; United States; 21.290°N 157.807°W

Information
- Type: Private
- Motto: Memor et Fidelis (Mindful and Faithful)
- Religious affiliation: Catholic
- Established: 1846; 180 years ago
- Founder: Society of Mary
- Oversight: Marianists
- President: Dr. Glenn Medeiros
- Grades: K–12
- Gender: Boys
- Campus type: Urban
- Colors: Red and Blue
- Mascot: The Fighting Crusader
- Team name: Crusaders
- Rival: Kahuku High & Intermediate School; Punahou School
- Accreditation: Western Association of Schools and Colleges
- Newspaper: The Collegian
- Yearbook: The Crusader
- Website: www.saintlouishawaii.org

Saint Louis School is a historic Catholic college preparatory school for boys located in the neighborhood of St. Louis Heights in Honolulu, Hawaii. It was founded in 1846 to serve Catholics in the former Kingdom of Hawaii. Located within the Diocese of Honolulu, it is affiliated with the Society of Mary, a religious order of brothers and priests called the Marianists who also administer Chaminade University of Honolulu, formerly the college section of Saint Louis School. It is located near Sacred Hearts Academy, a girls' school founded by the Congregation of the Sacred Hearts of Jesus and Mary, and both schools hold joint programs such as cultural festivals and the JROTC.

== History ==
=== Establishment ===
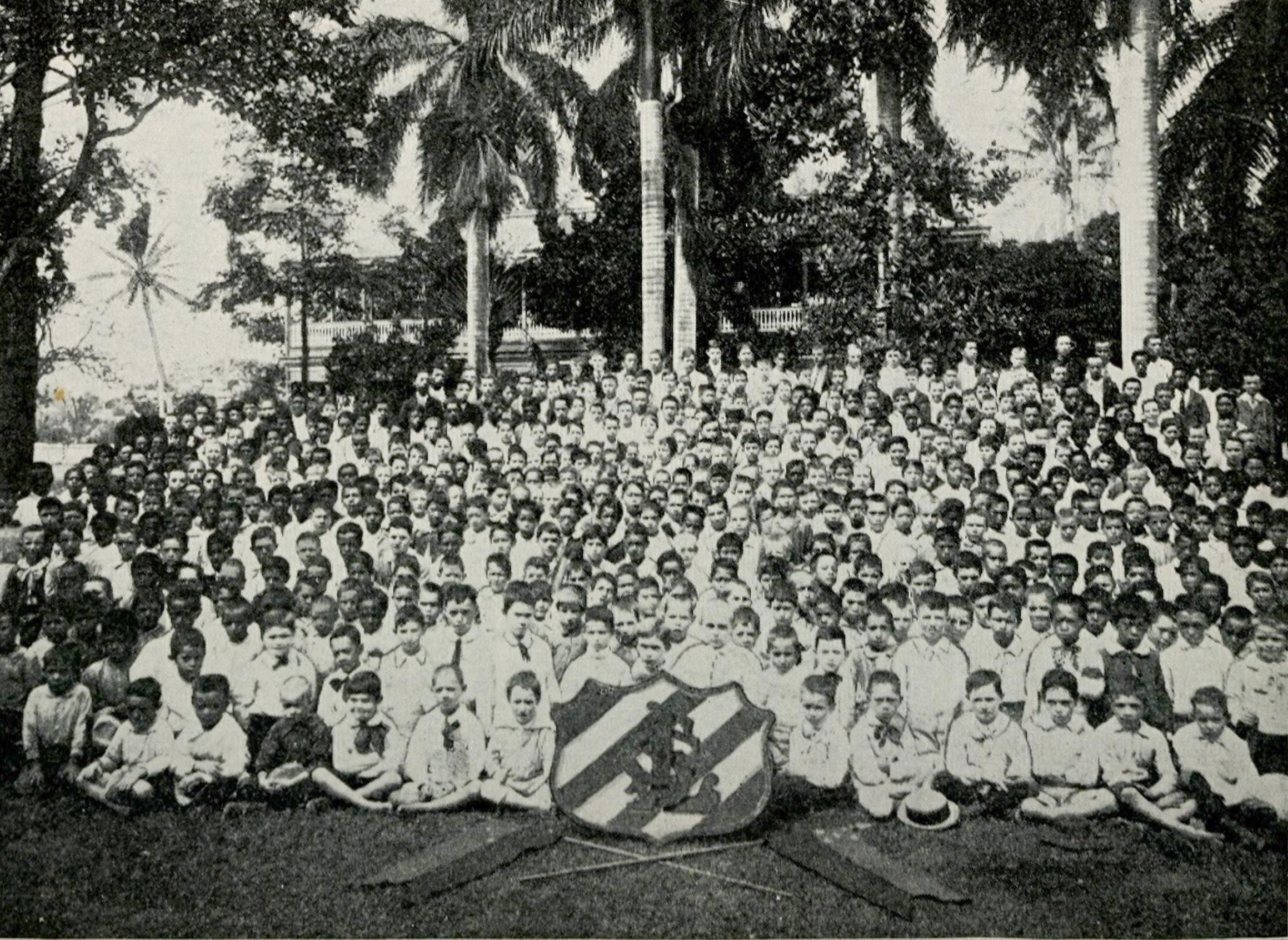
Students in the 1890s

Saint Louis School was originally located in the ʻĀhuimanu area of windward Oʻahu as the College of ʻĀhuimanu, founded in 1846 by the Fathers of the Society of Mary. In 1881, the school was relocated to Beretania Street, in downtown Honolulu, adjacent to Washington Place, the home of Liliuokalani, who was Queen of Hawaii from 1891 to 1893. When the school moved to downtown Honolulu, it was called the College of Saint Louis, named after the patron saint of Louis Maigret, Bishop of Honolulu. In 1883, the school moved again for a third time to Kamakela (known today as College Walk), on the bank of the Nuʻuanu Stream, near Chinatown, Honolulu. This remained the campus until the 1920s.

The high school and college sections eventually split up and the emblem for Saint Louis College can be seen above the door of the administration building of Chaminade University on the Chaminade/Saint Louis campus. Marianists assumed control of the school and determined a need to expand facilities to serve the burgeoning Hawaiian Catholic population, who included many Filipino immigrants. Because of the Marianist core mission to educate regardless of ethnic, religious, or fiscal means, the Order purchased land in Kalaepōhaku, a hillside division of Honolulu's Kaimuki community, to enable the school to better serve Hawaii. Kalaepōhaku opened in September 1928 as Saint Louis School.

=== Developments ===
In the years following World War II, Saint Louis School re-evaluated its mission. Beginning in 1949, it dropped the lower grade levels one at a time, concentrating on a curriculum as a high school serving grades 9 through 12.

In 1980, it reinstated grades 7 and 8. In 1990, grade 6 was reinstated. The school created a middle school consisting of grades 6 through 8, operating independently within Saint Louis School. Grade 5 was reinstated and added to the middle school. In 2015 Saint Louis School announced its plans to expand again to become a K-12 school for the 2016–17 school year. That same year, it hired former pop singer Glenn Medeiros as its president. An article from nonprofit news organization Honolulu Civil Beat focused on allegations of mismanagement under Medeiros’ leadership, including retaliation against staff and nepotism for allowing his wife to run a nail salon at the school. However, members of the board have refuted these claims, while acknowledging there had been some challenges.

== Academics ==
Saint Louis School is accredited by the Western Catholic Education Association (WCEA) and the Western Association of Schools and Colleges (WASC). It offers three distinct curricula.

- An accelerated college preparatory program for students planning to attend very selective colleges or universities. This includes a partnership with Chaminade University of Honolulu, whereby students can take courses and remain on campus for dual-enrollment credit.
- A college preparatory program.
- A general program for students planning to attend trade or business schools, two-year community colleges, or enter the military or work force.

== Notable alumni ==
Listed alphabetically by last name (year of graduation):

Government

- Duke Aiona (1973), Lieutenant Governor of Hawai'i from 2002 to 2010
- Neal S. Blaisdell (1921), Mayor of Honolulu from 1955 to 1969
- John A. Burns (1930), 2nd Governor of the State of Hawaii from 1962 to 1974
- Peter Tali Coleman (1939), Governor of American Samoa
- Sun Fo (1911), high-ranking official in the government of the Republic of China; Premier of the Republic of China from 26 November 1948 to 12 March 1949
- Kim Coco Iwamoto (1986), Hawaii state representative from 2024 to present, Hawaii Board of Education member from 2006 to 2011
- Jarrett Keohokalole (2001), Hawaii state senator (2018 to present) and former state representative (2014 to 2018)
- John C. Lane (1890), Mayor of Honolulu from 1915 to 1917
- Calvin Say (1970), Speaker of the Hawaii House of Representatives from 1999 to 2013, member from 1976 to 2021

Athletics (American football)

- Sneeze Achiu (1921) – Professional football player.
- Tyson Alualu (2005), professional football player for the Pittsburgh Steelers
- Timmy Chang (2000), head coach of the Hawaii Rainbow Warriors; former collegiate quarterback for the Hawaii Rainbow Warriors; ranked 2nd all-time in NCAA career passing yards with 17,072
- Kamalei Correa (2012), former linebacker for the Boise State Broncos and last played for the Jacksonville Jaguars; drafted in the 2nd round of the 2016 NFL draft to the Baltimore Ravens
- Jayden de Laura (2020), quarterback for the Vegas Knight Hawks of the Indoor Football League
- Chris Fuamatu-Ma'afala (1995), former NFL running back for the Pittsburgh Steelers and the Jacksonville Jaguars
- Jason Gesser (1998), former collegiate quarterback for the Washington State Cougars; 2002 Pac-10 Co-offensive player of the year with Carson Palmer
- Nate Herbig (2016), former NFL player for the Philadelphia Eagles, New York Jets, Pittsburgh Steelers, and Washington Commanders
- Cameron Higgins (2005), former quarterback for the Weber State Wildcats
- Reggie Ho (1984), former placekicker for the Notre Dame Fighting Irish; cardiologist
- Olin Kreutz (1995), former NFL player for the Chicago Bears and the New Orleans Saints; 4-time NFL All-Pro selection, 6-time Pro Bowl selection, and member of the NFL 2000s All-Decade Team
- Marcus Mariota (2011), quarterback for the Washington Commanders; 3-time Pac-12 All-Conference 1st Team (2012, 2013, 2014); 2013 Fiesta Bowl MVP, 2013 Alamo Bowl MVP, 2014 Heisman Winner, and 2015 Rose Bowl MVP; second overall pick, taken by the Tennessee Titans in the 2015 NFL draft
- Jeremiah Masoli (2006), quarterback for the Oregon Ducks and Ole Miss Rebels; 2008 Holiday Bowl MVP; former quarterback for the BC Lions of the Canadian Football League
- Vili Maumau (1993), former defensive tackle for the Colorado Buffaloes and the Carolina Panthers
- Dominic Raiola (1996), former NFL player for the Detroit Lions; 2000 All-American center and Rimington Trophy winner for the Nebraska Cornhuskers
- Jonah Savaiinaea (2022), offensive lineman for the Miami Dolphins; drafted 37th overall in the 2025 NFL draft
- Craig Stutzmann (1998), college football coach
- Tua Tagovailoa (2016), quarterback for the Atlanta Falcons; drafted 5th overall in the 2020 NFL draft
- Herman Wedemeyer (1943), football player
- Roman Wilson (2020), wide receiver for the Pittsburgh Steelers; drafted in the 3rd round in the 2024 NFL draft

Athletics (baseball)

- Benny Agbayani (1989), former professional baseball player for the New York Mets, the Colorado Rockies and the Boston Red Sox
- Rico Garcia (2012), MLB pitcher for the Colorado Rockies, San Francisco Giants, Baltimore Orioles, Oakland Athletics, Washington Nationals, and New York Mets
- Brandon League (2001), former professional baseball player for the Toronto Blue Jays, Seattle Mariners, and Los Angeles Dodgers; 2011 MLB All-star
- Caleb Lomavita (2021), MLB catcher for the Washington Nationals
- Chad Santos (1999), former professional baseball player for the San Francisco Giants
- Ka'ai Tom (2012), former professional baseball player for the Oakland Athletics, Pittsburgh Pirates, and San Francisco Giants
- Jordan Yamamoto (2014), former professional baseball player for the Miami Marlins and New York Mets

Athletics (Other)

- Travis Lee (2001), two-time NCAA wrestling champion for the Cornell Big Red
- Ted Makalena, American professional golfer

Other

- Robert Cabal (Harold C. McColgan) (1935), Actor
- Joseph Caravalho (1975), US Army physician and current Deputy Surgeon General and Deputy Commanding General (Support), United States Army Medical Command
- Walter A. Dods, Jr. (1959), Hawaii bank executive
- George Helm (1968), Native Hawaiian community leader, co-founder of Protect Kahoolawe Ohana
- Andrew Le (2001), Chef, Hale ‘Aina Award for the "Restaurateur of the Year" in 2017 James Beard Foundation Award semifinalist in 2023 and 2024.
- Richard Mamiya (1944), award winning heart surgeon and philanthropist
- Dean Pitchford (1968), songwriter, screenwriter, director, actor, and novelist; Oscar, Golden Globe, and Grammy Award winner for Fame; screenwriter for the motion picture Footloose
