= William Cullen McBride High School =

Catholic preparatory school in Missouri

Location
- 1909 North Kingshighway; St. Louis, Missouri 63113; United States; 38°39′57.96″N 90°15′36.36″W

Information
- Type: Private college-preparatory school
- Religious affiliation: Roman Catholic
- Established: 1925
- Closed: 1971
- Grades: 9–12
- Gender: Boys
- Colors: Orange and green
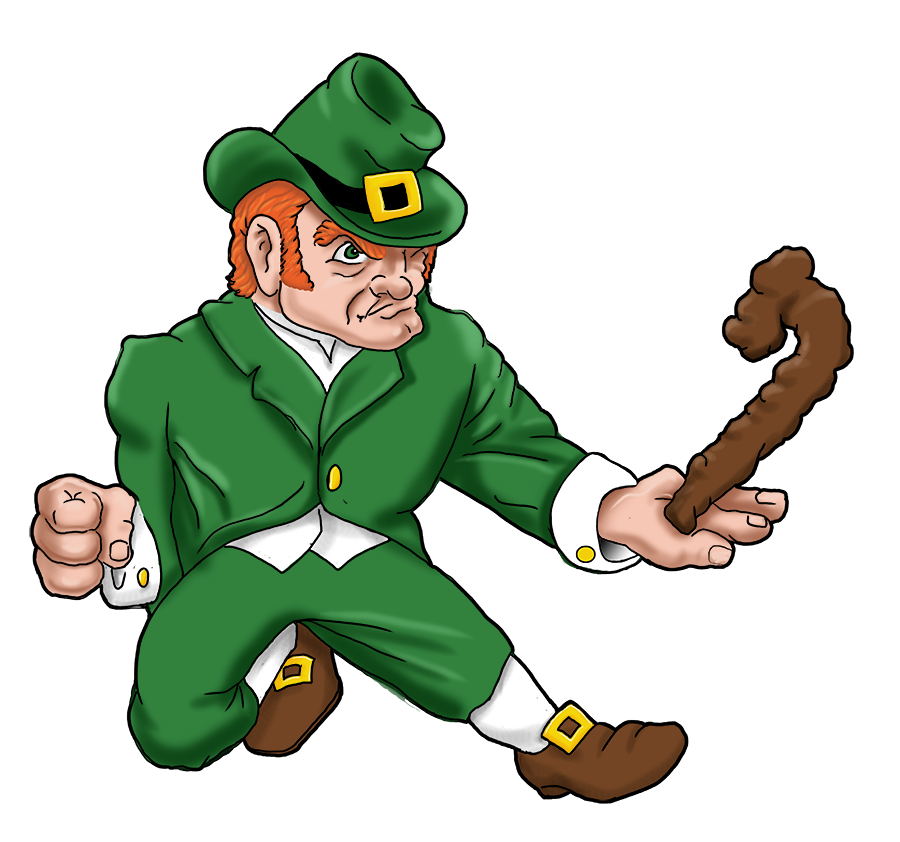
- Mascot: The Fighting Mick

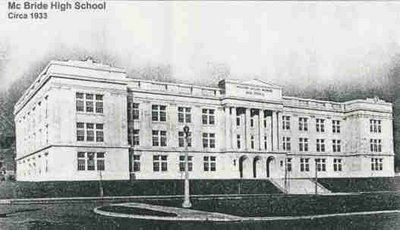
McBride High School building, 1933

William Cullen McBride High School (commonly McBride High School) was a Catholic college preparatory school for boys in St. Louis, Missouri. Operated by the Society of Mary within the Archdiocese of St. Louis, the school opened in 1925 and served approximately 7,500 students before closing in 1971.

== History ==
Originally founded in 1911 as Kenrick Catholic Boy's High School, the school moved to its new (and final) location at 1909 North Kingshighway in 1925, changing its name to William Cullen McBride High School in honor of its benefactor the prominent St. Louis businessman and philanthropist.

The $250,000 limestone structure at Kingshighway and Cote Brilliante opened with public tours and a basketball exhibition in January 1925. The facility became a landmark for Catholic secondary education in north St. Louis and remained in use until the school’s closure nearly five decades later.

The school was named for William Cullen McBride, founder of W. C. McBride, Inc., a St. Louis oil company established in the late nineteenth century which exists today as Orthwein Energy, headquartered in Oklahoma City.

In May 1970 the Globe-Democrat reported that the Marianist order staffing McBride would be reassigned as part of a system-wide reorganization by Archbishop Carberry, foreshadowing the school’s closure the following year. The decision to close was announced in January 1971 and covered extensively in the St. Louis Post-Dispatch.

== Academics and student life ==
In 1957 McBride was one of two high schoolls selected to pilot an Archdiocesan program for gifted students introducing college-level coursework. Community events such as the annual father-son banquet and a 25th-anniversary celebration in 1928 reflected the school’s close ties with St. Louis families and alumni.

== Athletics ==
McBride became widely recognized as a powerhouse in interscholastic sports, producing championship teams, and collegiate and professional athletes across multiple sports. Its basketball and football programs were regularly covered by city newspapers, and the school’s competitive spirit was cited as emblematic of its community identity.

== Legacy ==
After the school’s closure, former students organized the McBride Alumni Association, which continues to hold reunions and support scholarships within the archdiocese. In 2024, the association published Men of McBride: Stories of Character, Commitment, and Contribution, a collection of alumni profiles and reflections.

== Notable alumni ==
- Bob Carpenter (1971), sportscaster and television play-by-play announcer for the Washington Nationals
- Joe Clarke (1972), professional soccer player and coach
- Michael J. Garanzini (1967), Jesuit priest and president of Loyola University Chicago
- Clarence Harmon (1959), 43rd Mayor of St. Louis
- Bill McDermott (1966), professional soccer broadcaster known as "Mr. Soccer"
- Joseph Alphonse McNicholas (1941), Bishop of Springfield, IL
- Bill Knoedelseder (1965), investigative journalist for the Los Angeles Times and author of several nonfiction works including Stiffed: A True Story of MCA, the Music Business, and the Mafia, Bitter Brew: The Rise and Fall of Anheuser-Busch and America’s Kings of Beer, and I’m Dying Up Here: Heartbreak and High Times in Stand-Up Comedy’s Golden Era
- Edward O'Meara (1939), Archbishop of Indianapolis and chair of Catholic Relief Services
- Gus Otto (1961), NFL linebacker
- Gene Pepper (1946), NFL lineman
- John Poelker (1930), 40th Mayor of St. Louis
- Dick Rosenthal (1949), NBA forward and athletic director
- Joseph D. Rupp (1968), CEO of Olin Corporation and board member at Nucor
- Robert A. Young (1941), U.S. Representative from Missouri
