= Henry Christian =

Henry Christian may refer to:

- Henry B. Christian (1883–1953), American painter
- Henry Asbury Christian (1876–1951), American professor of pathology
