= Arman Manookian =

Ottoman Empire-born Armenian and American painter (1904–1931)

- Արման Թադէոս Մանուկեան
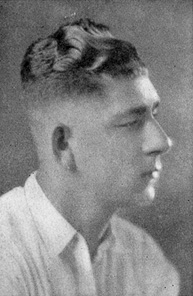
- Manookian, c. 1927
- Born: Tateos Manookian; May 15, 1904; Constantinople, Ottoman Empire (now Istanbul, Turkey)
- Died: May 10, 1931 (aged 26); Honolulu, Territory of Hawaii (now Hawaii, U.S.)
- Education: Rhode Island School of Design, Art Students League of New York
- Occupations: Visual artist, illustrator
- Known for: Painting, muralist, decorative artist, printmaker
- Movement: Art deco

Arman Tateos Manookian (Armenian: Արման Թադէոս Մանուկեան; May 15, 1904 – May 10, 1931), born as Tateos Manookian, was an Ottoman Empire-born Armenian and American painter, printmaker, and illustrator, best known for his works depicting Hawaiian scenes. He lived in Honolulu for the last years of his life.

== Early life ==
Arman Tateos Manookian was the oldest of three children born to an Armenian Christian family in Constantinople, Ottoman Empire (now Istanbul, Turkey). As a teenager, he survived the Armenian genocide. Manookian immigrated to the United States in 1920.

At the age of 16 he studied illustration at the Rhode Island School of Design. Later he took classes at the Art Students League of New York, before enlisting in the United States Marine Corps in 1923.

== Career ==
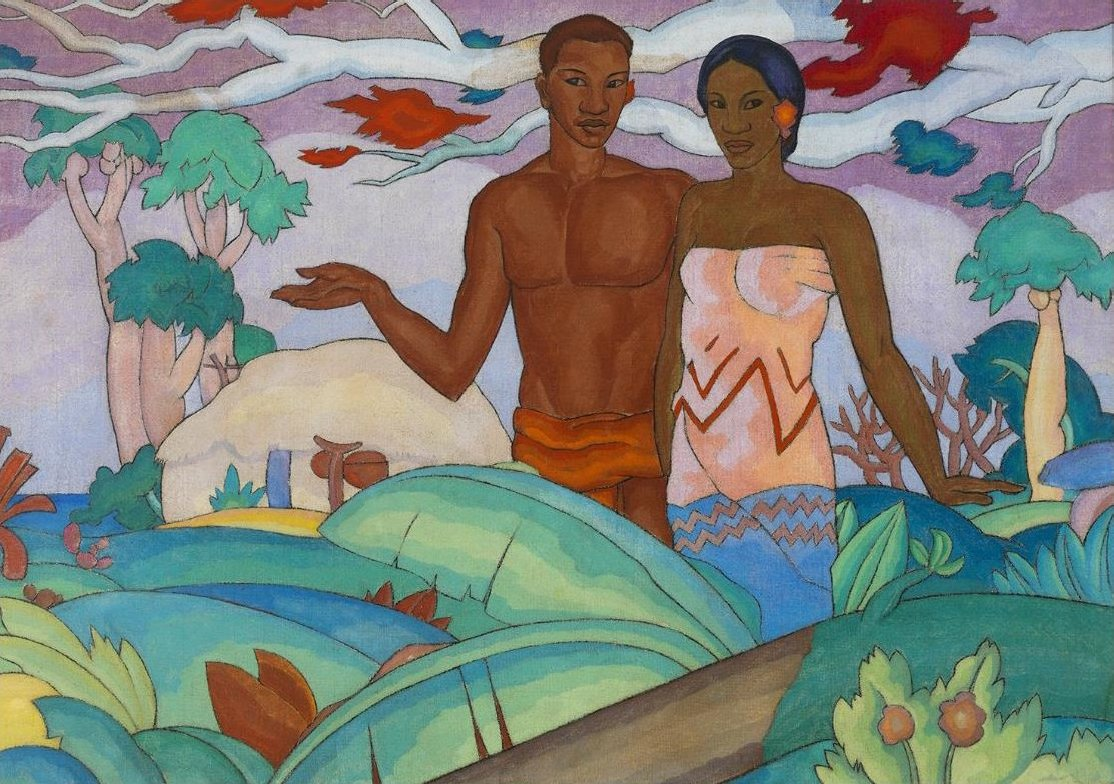
Hawaiian Boy and Girl, mural by Arman Manookian

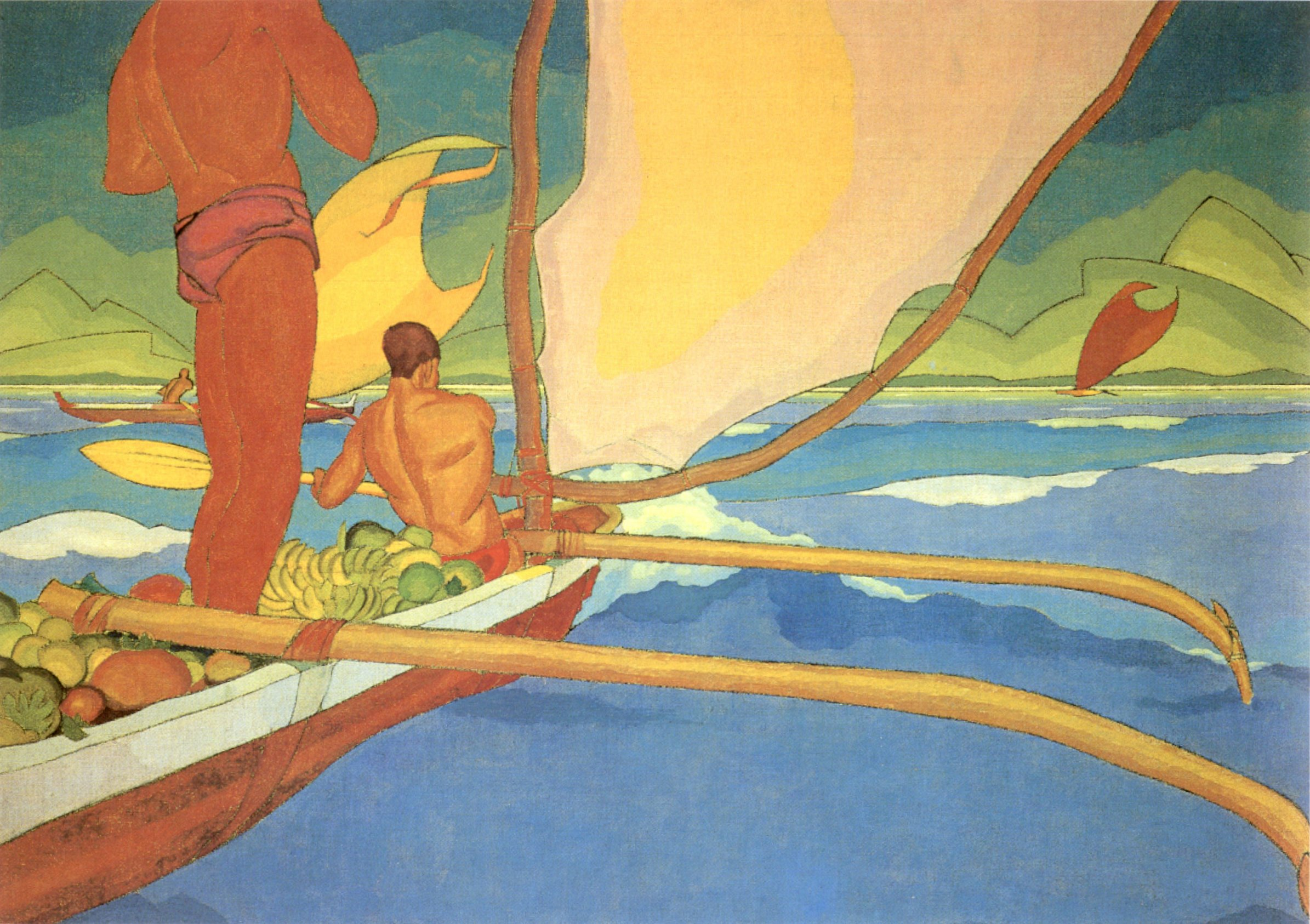
Men in an Outrigger Canoe Headed for Shore, 1929

While serving in the United States Marine Corps he was assigned as a clerk to the author and historian, Major Edwin North McClellan. While in the Marines, Manookian had supplied illustrations for Leatherneck Magazine, and produced about 75 ink drawings for McClellan's history of the United States Marine Corps, which was never published. These drawings are now in the collection of the Honolulu Museum of Art.

In 1927, Manookian was honorably discharged from the Marine Corps, but remained in Hawaii. He worked for the Honolulu Star-Bulletin and for Paradise of the Pacific.

Manookian's artwork was best known for its romantic and idealized illustrations and paintings of Hawaiian landscapes, and of ancient Hawaiian culture. His portraits often featured a focus on overtly masculine bodies. Manookian's last known artwork made was a three panel mural of flamingos for a private residency in Halekou Heights in Kāneʻohe, Hawaii.

The Bishop Museum and the Honolulu Museum of Art are among the public collections holding works by Manookian. According to the State of Hawaii's House of Representatives, he is "known as Hawaii's Van Gogh". Only thirty-one of his oil paintings are known to exist as of 2011.

== Death and legacy ==
He ended his life committing suicide on May 10, 1931, using poison at a party, because of his severe depression. His oil paintings are rare and highly valued based on their almost iconic status and scarcity due to his early death.

The Honolulu Academy of Arts (now Honolulu Museum of Art) held a memorial exhibition shortly after Manookian's death in August 1931.

Honolulu Museum of Art held a retrospective exhibition titled Meaning in Color/Expression in Line: Arman Manookian’s Modernism, from late 2010 through early 2011.

In July 2010, a group of seven paintings owned by the Hotel Hana-Maui were removed from public display, they were originally thought to be Manookian's painting but some of them may have been copies by artist Larry Mayo. Two of the murals, Red Sails and Hawaiian Boy and Girl, are now on long-term loan to the Honolulu Museum of Art.

From July 3, 2014, to January 11, 2015, a number of Manookian paintings were on display at the Honolulu Museum of Art including Red Sails, Hawaiian Boy and Girl, Breadfruit, Pele, and Weaver.
