= Dominic Raiola =

American football player (born 1978)

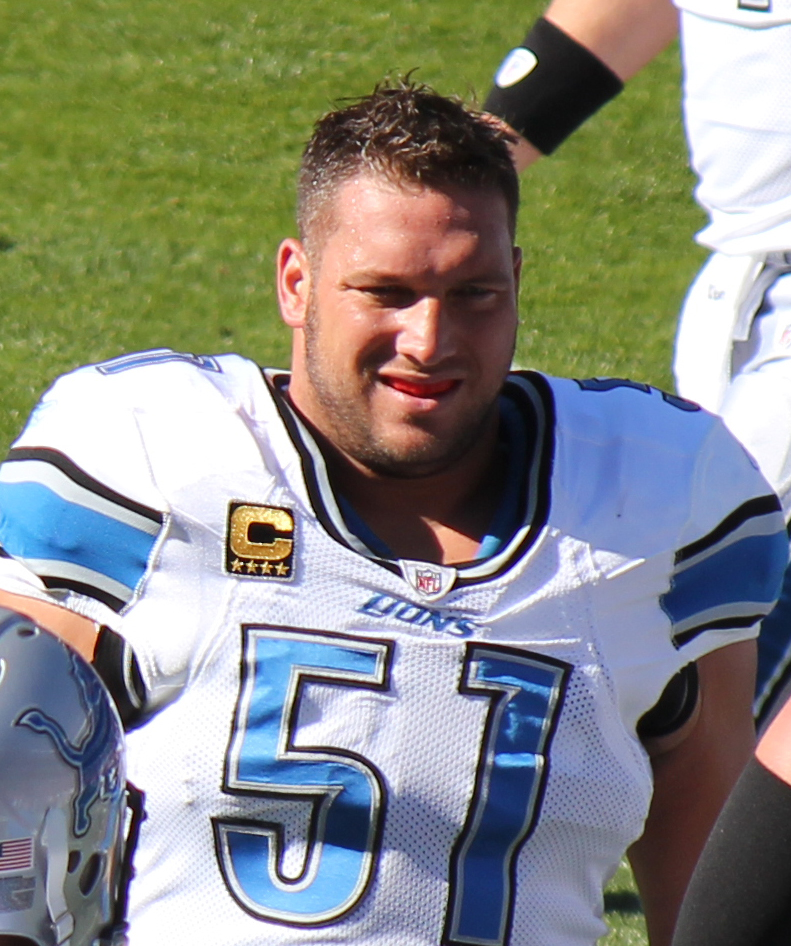
- Raiola with the Detroit Lions in 2011

No. 51
- Position: Center

Personal information
- Born: December 30, 1978 (age 47); Honolulu, Hawaii, U.S.
- Listed height: 6 ft 2 in (1.88 m)
- Listed weight: 310 lb (141 kg)

Career information
- High school: Saint Louis (Honolulu)
- College: Nebraska (1997–2000)
- NFL draft: 2001: 2nd round, 50th overall pick

Career history

Playing
- Detroit Lions (2001–2014)

Coaching
- Detroit Lions (2016–2017) Assistant strength and conditioning coach

Awards and highlights
- PFWA All-Rookie Team (2001); Rimington Trophy (2000); Consensus All-American (2000); 2× First-team All-Big 12 (1999, 2000); Nebraska Cornhuskers Jersey No. 54 retired

Career NFL statistics
- Games played: 219
- Games started: 203
- Fumble recoveries: 5
- Stats at Pro Football Reference

Dominic Raiola (/raɪˈoʊlə/ ry-OH-lə; born December 30, 1978) is an American former professional football player who was a center in the National Football League (NFL). He played college football for the Nebraska Cornhuskers, where he won the inaugural Rimington Trophy and earned All-American honors in 2000. He was selected by the Detroit Lions in the second round of the 2001 NFL draft, and played his entire 14-year career for the Lions.

== Early life ==
Raiola was born in Honolulu, Hawaii. He attended Saint Louis School in Honolulu, and played for the Saint Louis Crusaders high school football team. One of his teammates was Olin Kreutz, two years his senior. The Crusaders were undefeated in his last three years at the school; in 1996, his senior year, the team won its 11th straight Prep Bowl. That same year, St. Louis High was nationally ranked as the 15th-best team in the United States.

== College career ==
Raiola attended the University of Nebraska–Lincoln, where he played for the Cornhuskers from 1998 to 2000. In his first year, he became the first freshman offensive lineman to start a game for the Cornhuskers since 1991. In 1999, he became the first sophomore center for the team since Dave Rimington to participate in postseason play, and set a school record for knockdowns, which he bettered in 2000. Following his junior season in 2000, he won the Rimington Trophy as the best center in college football, and was recognized as a consensus first-team All-American.

== Professional career ==
=== 2001 NFL draft ===
Pre-draft measurables
Height	Weight	40-yard dash	10-yard split	20-yard split	20-yard shuttle	Three-cone drill	Vertical jump	Broad jump	Bench press
6 ft 2 in (1.88 m)	307 lb (139 kg)	5.13 s	1.72 s	2.90 s	4.35 s	7.55 s	33.0 in (0.84 m)	9 ft 0 in (2.74 m)	29 reps
All values from NFL Combine

Raiola was selected by the Detroit Lions in the 2001 NFL draft in the second round. He was the highest selected Nebraska offensive lineman since Zach Wiegert in the 1995 NFL draft, and the highest selected center since Dave Rimington in 1983. He was also the first center drafted by the Lions since Jeff Hartings in 1996.

=== Detroit Lions ===
Raiola started to get game time as a replacement center in the latter half of the season in a game against the San Francisco 49ers in November; it was his first game in that position. He was selected as a member of Pro Football Weekly's All-Rookie squad during that season.

In 2002, Raiola started all 16 games of the season, winning the Chuck Hughes Most Improved Player award. He was a key member of the offensive line which allowed only 20 quarterback sacks for the season, the lowest in the NFL and then a franchise record. Raiola protected both quarterback Joey Harrington and running back James Stewart.

In 2003, Raiola was a 16-game starter and a key part of the offensive line. During that season, the offensive line allowed just 11 sacks, a new record for the franchise. He also played more special teams, and became the long snapper when Bradford Banta broke his clavicle against the San Diego Chargers.

In 2004, Raiola started at center in all 16 games. The Lions' offensive line helped the team's rushing attack to be ranked second for the seven last games of the season. He again became responsible for long snapping after Jody Littleton incurred a hamstring injury against the Washington Redskins in the middle of November. His reliability and strong performance led to the Lions offering him a five-year contract extension in March 2005.

Raiola started 12 games in 2008 for the 0–16 Lions, dubbed by NFL Network "the Worst Team of All Time," eclipsing the 0–14 1976 Tampa Bay Buccaneers and the 12 straight losses of the 1977 Tampa Bay Buccaneers.

On June 26, 2009, the Lions signed Raiola to a four-year, $20 million extension through 2013. The deal included $9 million in guarantees.

Following the 2009 season, Raiola was named the recipient of the Detroit Lions/Detroit Sports Broadcasters Association/Pro Football Writers Association's Media-Friendly "Good Guy" Award. The Good Guy Award is given yearly to the Detroit Lions player who shows consideration to, and cooperation with the media at all times during the course of the season.

In the 2014 Thanksgiving Day game, Raiola became the first player in Detroit Lions history to start 200 games.

=== Controversies ===
On December 9, 2008, he was fined $7,500 by the Lions organization after he made an obscene gesture towards heckling Lions fans after Detroit fell to 0–13 with a 20–16 loss to the Minnesota Vikings at Ford Field.

On November 1, 2009, Raiola had another run-in with fans who were heckling rookie quarterback Matthew Stafford.

After on-the-field warm-ups at the October 6, 2013, game at Lambeau Field in Green Bay, several members of the University of Wisconsin Marching Band accused Raiola of verbal abuse, including using homophobic slurs and making comments about the band members' weight. The Detroit Lions subsequently issued an apology to the band and reported the behavior was against team policy, but added Raiola would not be disciplined by the team. Raiola stated to the media that he has more important things to worry about, like wins and losses.

Following a game against the New England Patriots on November 23, 2014, the Detroit Free Press reported that Raiola admitted to taking a cheap shot at Patriots defensive tackle Zach Moore on last play of the game. The Patriots ran for a late touchdown when they could have taken three kneel-downs and ended the game with a 27–9 win over the Lions, and that decision rankled Raiola. Raiola said after the game that he tried to cut-block Moore on the Lions' final offensive snap as retaliation for the score, which resulted in an even more lopsided 34–9 loss for Detroit. "I cut him," Raiola said. "We took a knee, so I cut the nose (tackle). They went for six. They went for a touchdown at two minutes. They could have taken three knees and the game could have been over. It's football. He wants to keep playing football, let's play football. Not a big deal. It's football." Patriots coach Bill Belichick responded during a press conference the following day, saying, "Sure there was a lot of frustration there with Raiola. He's never beaten us. Tough day for him."

NFL spokesman Michael Signora said the following Wednesday that Raiola was fined $10,000 for unnecessary roughness, but not for his cut block on Zach Moore on the game's final play. Instead, it was for a play against Moore earlier in the drive, when Moore beat him, and Raiola appeared to try to club him from behind.

In December 2014, Raiola stepped on the ankle of the Chicago Bears' Ego Ferguson. The NFL suspended Raiola for one game without pay and said that it was Raiola's sixth "safety-related rules violation since 2010".

Raiola worked for the Lions as a strength and conditioning assistant coach from 2016-2017.

== Personal life ==
Raiola was born in Honolulu, Hawaii, to Tony and Wendy Raiola. He has a younger sister, Nicole, and a younger brother, Donovan, who played center for the Washington Redskins in 2011. His father, a native of Hawaii, was a defensive lineman for the University of Miami in the mid-1970s, but saw his career cut short due to a shoulder injury in 1977.

Raiola fathered a son with Andrea Yee, born in 2007. In December 2012, Yee sued Raiola after he allegedly ceased paying her $195,000 in annual support and care payments.

Raiola has a son, Dylan, who was one of the highest-rated high school quarterback recruits in the class of 2024. In May 2022, Dylan verbally committed to play for the Ohio State Buckeyes, but later reopened his recruitment committing to the University of Georgia. However, he flipped his commitment to the Nebraska Cornhuskers on December 18, 2023. As of the 2026 season, Dylan is the backup quarterback behind Dante Moore for the Oregon Ducks.
