= United States Marine Corps History Division =

Unit of the United States Marine Corps

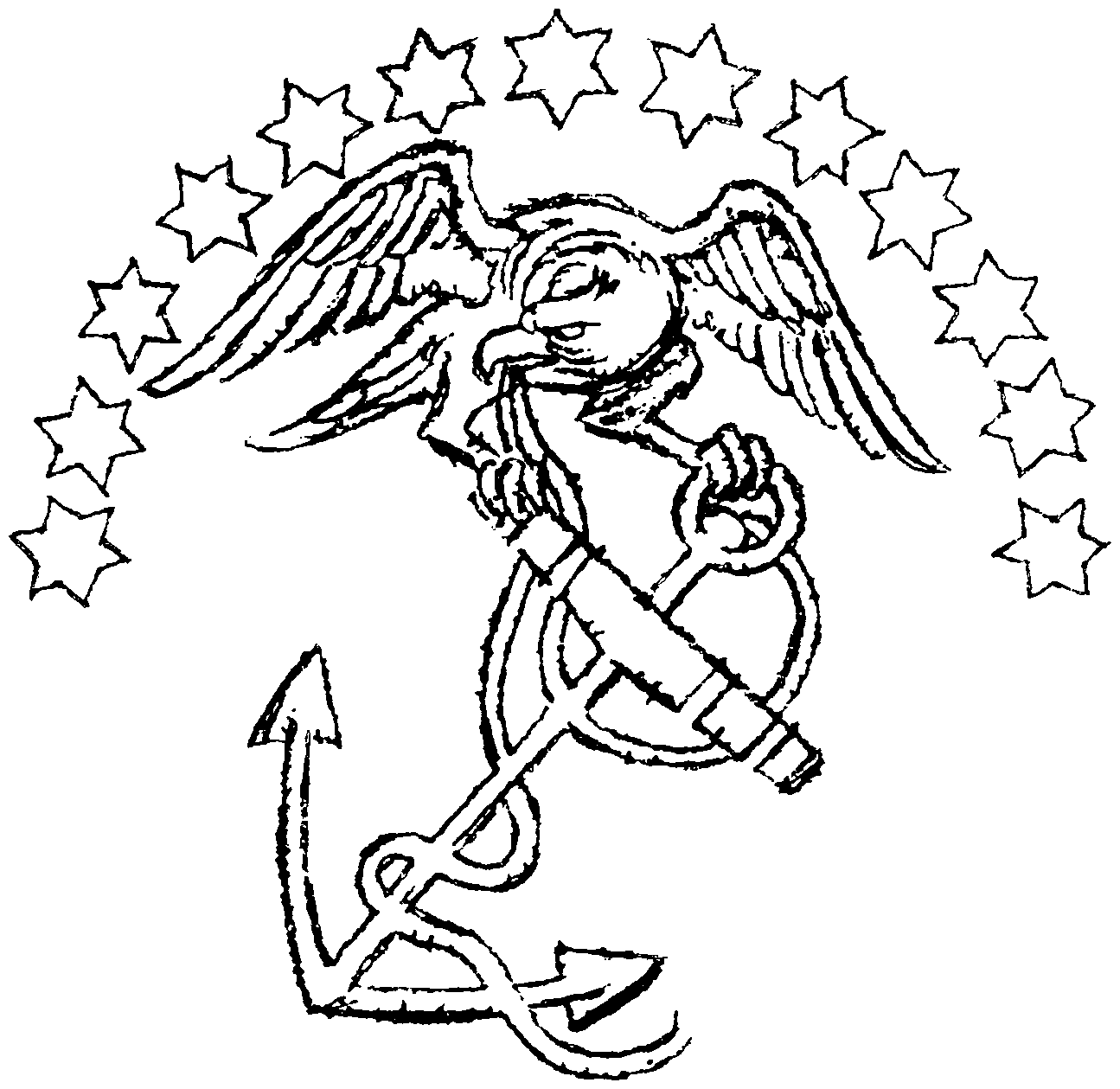
- The progenitor to the modern Eagle, Globe, and Anchor, this insignia was first used by Marines in 1804. Seen today on uniform buttons, it also serves as the History Division's unofficial logo.
- Active: 1919–present
- Country: United States
- Branch: U.S. Marine Corps
- Role: Military history
- Headquarters: Marine Corps Base Quantico
- Website: www.usmcu.edu/Research/History-Division/

Commanders
- Director: Dr. Shawn P. Callahan

The United States Marine Corps History Division is an arm of the Headquarters Marine Corps tasked with researching, writing, and maintaining the History of the United States Marine Corps. It also provides reference and research assistance; preserves personal experiences and observations through oral history interviews; and deploys field historians to record history in the making. It is headquartered at Marine Corps Base Quantico in Virginia.

== History ==
The History Division was formed on 8 September 1919, by Order Number 53 of Commandant of the Marine Corps George Barnett as the Historical Section of the Department of the Adjutant and Inspector. After World War II, the organization was known as "Marine Corps History and Museums Division" until the splitting of the division in 2005 in order to create the National Museum of the Marine Corps.

== Organization ==
The United States Marine Corps History Division is a staff organization with the primary task of researching and writing the Marine Corps’ official history. The unit is not a division-sized military formation. It is organized into four branches:

- The Historical Branch prepares a wide variety of official publications that tell the Marine Corps story as accurately and comprehensively as possible. Publications include: articles, monographs, occasional papers, and definitive histories. The Branch also includes the Oral History Program, which obtains, catalogs, transcribes, and preserves personal narrative, experiences and observations of historic value from active duty and retired Marines for use as reference source material.
- The Historical Reference Branch provides historical research and reference services and historical analysis. In addition, the Branch supports specific programs: Unit Lineage and Honors, Commemorative Naming, Marine Corps Flag Manual, and Marine Corps Chronology.
- The Field History Branch deploys Individual Mobilization Augmentee detachment historians to collect historically relevant material (oral history, written/electronic plans, operation orders, maps, overlays and artifacts) for use as reference material. The Branch also consists of a Mobilization Training Unit whose members support the History Division with specific projects.
- The Editing and Design branch designs and lays out manuscripts, maps and other graphic materials to support the History Division’s publications.

== Publications ==
The History Division maintains several publications, including the quarterly newsletter Fortitudine (ISBN 0-16-010404-1), which was a traditional motto of the Corps before semper fidelis was adapted in 1883. They also maintain an archive of all historical publications published since its founding.

== Directors ==
Since its inception, the following individuals have served as director:

#	Rank	Name	Tenure began	Tenure ended
1	Major	Edwin N. McClellan	8 September 1919	31 May 1925
2	Major	Edward W. Sturdevant	1 June 1925	15 August 1928
3	Captain	Lucian W. Burnham	16 August 1928	31 July 1929
acting	Mr.	James C. Jenkins	1 August 1926	26 September 1929
4	Captain	Jonas H. Platt	27 September 1929	19 June 1930
5	Major	Edwin N. McClellan	20 June 1930	2 March 1933
6	Captain	Harry A. Ellsworth	3 March 1933	30 August 1934
7	Lieutenant colonel	Alphonse DeCarre	31 August 1934	5 February 1935
8	Lieutenant colonel	Clyde H. Metcalf	6 February 1935	31 December 1938
acting	Mr.	James C. Jenkins	1 January 1939	4 October 1942
8	Colonel	Clyde H. Metcalf	5 October 1942	15 April 1944
acting	Captain	Philips D. Carleton	16 April 1944	2 May 1944
9	Colonel	John Potts	3 May 1944	2 January 1946
10	Colonel	Howard N. Kenyon	3 January 1946	15 October 1946
11	Lieutenant colonel	Ellsworth N. Murray	16 October 1946	20 December 1946
12	Lieutenant colonel	Robert D. Heinl Jr.	21 December 1946	12 June 1949
13	Lieutenant colonel	Gordon D. Gayle	13 June 1949	13 August 1951
14	Lieutenant colonel	Francis O. Hough	14 August 1951	8 June 1952
15	Lieutenant colonel	Harry W. Edwards	9 June 1952	17 July 1955
16	Colonel	Charles W. Harrison	18 July 1955	24 July 1959
17	Major	Hubard D. Kuokka	25 July 1959	17 August 1959
18	Major	Gerald Fink	18 August 1959	7 January 1960
19	Colonel	William M. Miller	8 January 1960	31 July 1961
20	Colonel	Thomas G. Roe	1 August 1961	30 June 1962
acting	Major	John H. Johnstone	1 July 1962	8 November 1962
21	Colonel	Joseph F. Wagner Jr.	9 November 1962	31 August 1963
22	Lieutenant colonel	Richard J. Schening	1 September 1963	14 November 1963
23	Colonel	Frank C. Caldwell	15 November 1963	30 November 1970
24	Brigadier general	Edwin H. Simmons	1 December 1971	1 July 1978
24	Brigadier general (ret.)	Edwin H. Simmons	21 October 1978	3 January 1996
25	Colonel	Michael F. Monigan	4 January 1996	11 July 1999
26	Colonel (ret.)	John W. Ripley	12 July 1999	31 August 2005
acting	Mr.	Charles D. Melson	1 September 2005	8 January 2006
acting	Colonel (ret.)	Richard D. Camp Jr.	9 January 2006	10 December 2006
27	Dr.	Charles P. Neimeyer	11 December 2006	December 2017
28	Dr.	Edward T. Nevgloski	19 May 2019	December 2022
29	Dr.	Shawn P. Callahan	29 January 2024	Present

== See also ==
- Lineage and honors certificate
- National Museum of the Marine Corps
