= Jason Simmons =

American football player and coach (born 1976)

Pittsburgh Steelers
- Title: Defensive pass game coordinator & defensive backs coach

Personal information
- Born: March 30, 1976 (age 50); Inglewood, California, U.S.
- Listed height: 5 ft 9 in (1.75 m)
- Listed weight: 204 lb (93 kg)

Career information
- Position: Safety (No. 23, 30, 22)
- High school: Leuzinger (Lawndale, California)
- College: Arizona State (1995–1997)
- NFL draft: 1998: 5th round, 137th overall pick

Career history

Playing
- Pittsburgh Steelers (1998–2001); Houston Texans (2002–2007)

Coaching
- Green Bay Packers (2011–2019); Defensive assistant & secondary coach (2011–2015); Assistant special teams coach (2016–2017); Secondary coach (2018); Defensive backs coach (2019); Carolina Panthers (2020–2021) Defensive pass game coordinator & secondary coach; Las Vegas Raiders (2022–2023) Defensive backs coach & pass game coordinator; Washington Commanders (2024–2025) Defensive pass game coordinator; Pittsburgh Steelers (2026–present) Defensive pass game coordinator & defensive backs coach

Awards and highlights
- Second-team All-Pac-10 (1997)

Career NFL statistics
- Tackles: 241
- Sacks: 2
- Forced fumbles: 6
- Fumble recoveries: 3
- Interceptions: 2
- Stats at Pro Football Reference

Jason Lawrence Simmons (born March 30, 1976) is an American professional football coach and former safety who is the defensive pass game coordinator and defensive backs coach for the Pittsburgh Steelers of the National Football League (NFL). He played college football for the Arizona State Sun Devils and was selected by the Pittsburgh Steelers in the fifth round of the 1998 NFL draft, later playing for the Houston Texans. Simmons' coaching career began in 2011 as a defensive assistant with the Green Bay Packers, later having stints with the Carolina Panthers, Las Vegas Raiders, and Washington Commanders.

== College career ==
He was a four-year letterman for Arizona State University, earning second-team All-Pacific-10 honors as a senior.

== Coaching career ==
Simmons began his coaching career in 2011 with the Green Bay Packers. He spent nine seasons with the Packers serving in a variety of roles such as defensive backs (2019), secondary (2018), assistant special teams (2016–17), and defensive assistant (2011–15). Green Bay's defense recorded 146 total interceptions, tied for the fourth most by any team during Simmons’ time in Green Bay. While serving as the assistant special teams coach, the Packers ranked second in the league in opponent punt return average (5.7) and yards per punt return (10.7). Simmons helped two different punters (Tim Masthay and Justin Vogel) eclipse the Packers all-time single season net punt average.

During the 2019 season as the defensive backs coach, he helped Green Bay advance to the NFC Championship game and finish the regular season ranked in the top five of the following categories: interceptions, completions percentage allowed, pass break ups, forced fumbles, and fewest touchdowns allowed. Cornerback Kevin King had five interceptions and 15 passes defended which ranked tied fourth and tied eighth in the league, respectively. Jaire Alexander had two interceptions and had 17 passes defended which ranked tied fourth in the league.

Simmons joined the Carolina Panthers for the 2020-21 after being promoted to defensive pass game coordinator and secondary coach. In the 2021 season, the Carolina defense finished the year 2nd in total defense and 3rd in opponent passing yards per game.

In 2022-23 he served in the same role as defensive pass game coordinator and secondary coach with the Las Vegas Raiders. In 2023, the Raiders ranked ninth in scoring defense, and allowed only 19.5 points per game, their best mark since 2006. Las Vegas’ secondary accounted for three touchdowns, which was the most in franchise history since 2000.

Simmons spent the 2024 season with the Washington Commanders. In Simmons’ first season in Washington, he improved the team’s pass defense tremendously. Under his guidance, Washington improved from 32nd to 3rd in opponent passing yards per game (189.5), the franchise’s best average since 2004. The defense also ranked 6th in the NFL in opposing completion percentage.

On February 2, 2026, Simmons was hired by the Pittsburgh Steelers as the team's pass game coordinator and defensive backs coach.

== NFL career statistics ==
Legend
**Bold**	Career high

Year	Team	Games		Tackles				Interceptions				Fumbles			
Year	Team	GP	GS	Comb	Solo	Ast	Sck	Int	Yds	TD	Lng	FF	FR	Yds	TD
1998	PIT	6	0	8	7	1	0.0	0	0	0	0	1	0	0	0
1999	PIT	16	0	16	14	2	0.0	0	0	0	0	0	**1**	0	0
2000	PIT	15	0	28	25	3	0.0	0	0	0	0	**2**	0	0	0
2001	PIT	12	0	20	17	3	0.0	0	0	0	0	0	0	0	0
2002	HOU	15	0	20	19	1	**1.0**	0	0	0	0	1	**1**	0	0
2003	HOU	16	2	33	28	5	0.0	0	0	0	0	0	0	0	0
2004	HOU	10	6	41	35	6	0.0	**1**	0	0	0	1	0	0	0
2005	HOU	14	1	28	22	6	**1.0**	0	0	0	0	1	**1**	0	0
2006	HOU	16	2	**46**	**39**	**7**	0.0	**1**	**11**	0	**11**	0	0	0	0
2007	HOU	1	1	1	1	0	0.0	0	0	0	0	0	0	0	0
Career		121	12	241	207	34	2.0	2	11	0	11	6	3	0	0
