= Edwin North McClellan =

US Marine Corps officer, author, and historian (1881–1971)

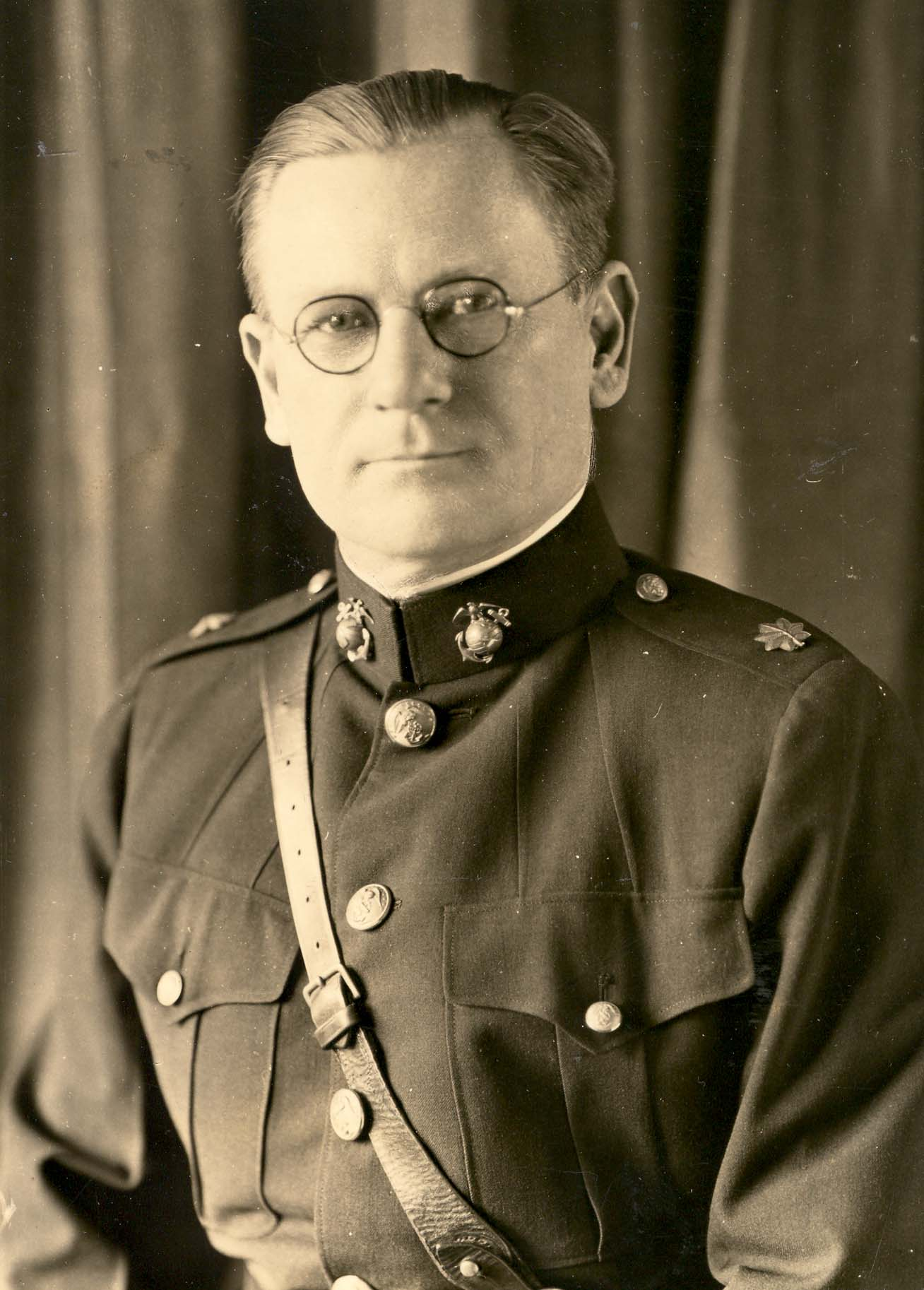
- Portrait c. 1934-36
- Born: December 5, 1881; Philadelphia, Pennsylvania
- Died: July 25, 1971 (aged 89); Naval Hospital Philadelphia
- Military career
- Allegiance: United States
- Branch: United States Marine Corps
- Service years: 1907–1936
- Rank: Lieutenant colonel
- Nickname: Ned North

Edwin North McClellan (December 5, 1881 – July 25, 1971) was a United States Marine Corps officer, author, and historian. He was the first director of the Historical Section of Headquarters Marine Corps, a historiographical organization now known as Marine Corps History Division.

== Biography ==
He was born on December 5, 1881, in Philadelphia, Pennsylvania.

He was commissioned as a second lieutenant in the United States Marine Corps on 18 June 18, 1907, attended School of Application, starting his first assignment on 25 December 1908 aboard the USS Wisconsin in time to participate in the cruise of the Great White Fleet. On 25 December 1909, he was reassigned to the Marine Barracks at Naval Station Norfolk, and promoted to first lieutenant on 25 May 1910. The same day, he departed for the Philippines, arriving in Manila on 2 December and remaining there until departing for Peking, China on 1 August 1912. While there, he commanded the Mounted Detachment of the China Marines from 18 December 1912 to 9 July 1913.

After a brief stayover at Mare Island Naval Shipyard, McClellan served in the Judge Advocate General's Corps in Washington, D.C., from 14 November 1913 to 9 February 1917. His work was mostly writing, preparing the Index-Digest of Court-Martial Orders from 1914 to 1916, and the Naval Digest of 1916. During this assignment, he attended the George Washington University Law School, graduating in 1916, and was promoted to captain on 29 August of that year.

He then returned to sea aboard USS Arizona, commanding the ship's Marine Detachment. When named to command the Marines of Battleship Force No. 1, Atlantic Fleet aboard USS Minnesota on 22 May 1917, he was temporarily promoted to major, later made permanent. He served most of World War I aboard the Minnesota, until she struck a mine on 29 September 1918, then was detached to Marine Barracks, Quantico, Virginia, on 14 October when she put in for repairs.

After the Armistice with Germany ended the war, McClellan was assigned on 28 February 1919 for duty with the Historical Section of the United States Army War College, detached to the American Expeditionary Forces in France. Charged with documenting the activities of the Marine Corps during the war, he remained in Europe until 17 August. Three days later, he returned to the United States and was assigned to Headquarters Marine Corps. On 8 September, the Historical Section, Adjutant and Inspectors Department, was established by Marine Corps Order No. 53, and McClellan was placed in charge, a post he would hold until 1925. The section consisted of one officer and several enlisted clerks. On 7 November 1924 Private Arman Manookian, a young artist, was assigned as one of McClellan's clerks.

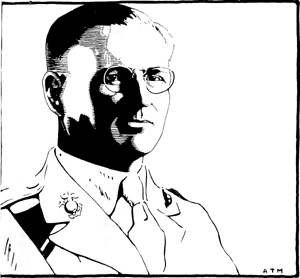
Ink portrait of McClellan in 1925 by Manookian

On 21 October 1921, Maj McClellan suggested to the Commandant of the Marine Corps, MajGen John A. Lejeune, that 10 November be designated as the birth date of the Marine Corps, an anniversary that had not typically been celebrated to that point. He suggested the date be declared a holiday, with celebrations held throughout the Corps, to include a ball. Lejeune issued Marine Corps Order No. 47, which mandated this celebration, and the order was republished each year at the United States Marine Corps birthday ball. Also during his tenure, he was Secretary-Treasurer of the Marine Corps Association from 1 July 1921 to 1 October 1922, and edited five issues of the Marine Corps Gazette.

On 1 June 1925, McClellan was transferred to the Marine Barracks at Pearl Harbor, in Hawaii, and took Manookian with him. McClellan departed Hawaii 15 November 1927, when he briefly toured the Western Recruiting Region. On 19 October 1928, he joined the 5th Marine Regiment to serve as a photographer of the occupation of Nicaragua until 24 July of the next year. After a brief stop in Quantico to attend the Field Officer's Course, he returned to direct the Historical Section again on 20 June 1930. During this second tour, he compiled a seven-volume history of the Corps, but the Great Depression made printing unfeasible, so he resorted to hand-mimeographed copies for distribution.

Promoted to lieutenant colonel on 1 March 1934, McClellan served a brief tour at the end of the occupation of Haiti from 15 June to 15 August of that year. After a few months at the Philadelphia Naval Shipyard, he was sent to Shanghai to serve with the 4th Marine Regiment briefly, before being diverted to the Philippines again. There, he commanded the Marine Barracks at the Cavite Navy Yard until his retirement on 30 June 1936.

In retirement, McClellan returned briefly to Philadelphia before moving to Honolulu, only to return in 1941. He lived there until his death on July 25, 1971, at Naval Hospital Philadelphia and is buried in Philadelphia at Mount Moriah Cemetery.

== Publications ==
McClellan's published works consist of more than a hundred articles and books, some of which include:

- The Naval Digest: Containing Digests of Selected Decisions of the Secretary of the Navy and Opinions of the Judge Advocate General of the Navy, Washington, United States Government Printing Office, 1916.
- The True Sandino, (no publisher), 1934.
- Uniforms of the American Marines, 1775 to 1829 (PDF). Washington: Marine Corps History and Museums Division. 1974.
- How the Marine Band Started, (no publisher), 1923.
- “The American Island of Washington”, Paradise of the Pacific, 52(5):19,24, May 1940. (as "Ned North")
- “Is Fanning an American Islands?”, Paradise of the Pacific, 52(4):23-4, April 1940. (as "Ned North")
- “Seventeenth Cruise to Line Islands”, Paradise of the Pacific, 52(1):21, January 1940. (as "Ned North")
- “Eighteenth Cruise to Line Islands”, Paradise of the Pacific, 52(5):30, May 1940. (as "Ned North")
- The United States Marine Corps in the World War, Nashville, Tennessee, Battery Press, 1997.

Several of McClellan's works were originally published as mimeographed sheets. Two of his books, Uniforms of the American Marines, 1775 to 1829 and The United States Marine Corps in the World War have each been republished more than once.

== See also ==
- History of the United States Marine Corps
