= Olin Kreutz =

American football player (born 1977)

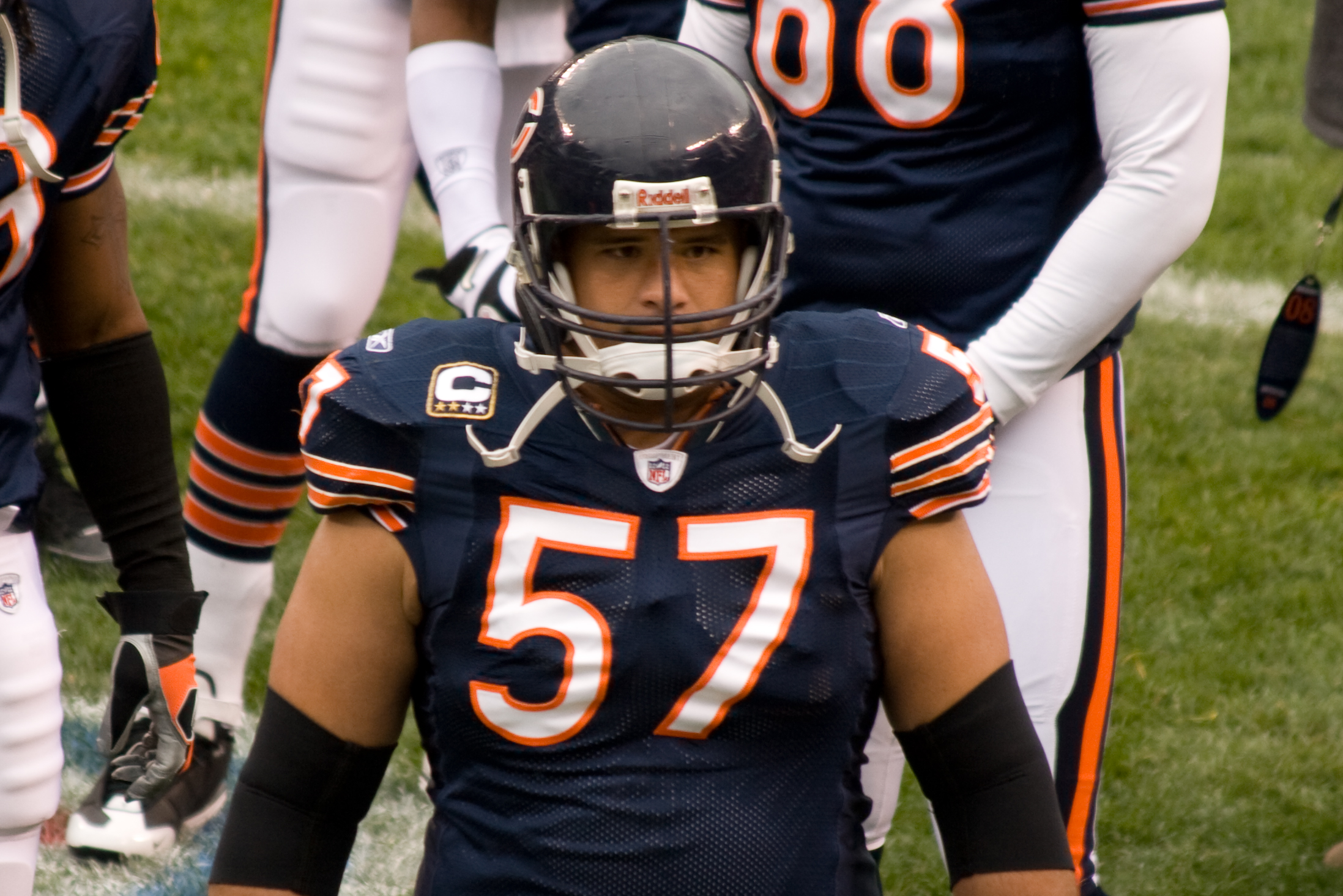
- Kreutz with the Chicago Bears in 2008

No. 57, 50
- Position: Center

Personal information
- Born: June 9, 1977 (age 49); Honolulu, Hawaii, U.S.
- Listed height: 6 ft 2 in (1.88 m)
- Listed weight: 292 lb (132 kg)

Career information
- High school: Saint Louis School (Honolulu)
- College: Washington
- NFL draft: 1998: 3rd round, 64th overall pick

Career history
- Chicago Bears (1998–2010); New Orleans Saints (2011)

Awards and highlights
- 2× First-team All-Pro (2005, 2006); 6× Pro Bowl (2001–2006); NFL 2000s All-Decade Team; 100 Greatest Bears of All-Time; Morris Trophy (1997); Consensus All-American (1997); 2× First-team All-Pac-10 (1996, 1997)

Career NFL statistics
- Games played: 195
- Games started: 187
- Fumble recoveries: 6
- Stats at Pro Football Reference
- College Football Hall of Fame

Olin George Kreutz (/ˈkruːts/; born June 9, 1977) is an American former professional football player who was a center in the National Football League (NFL) for fourteen seasons. He played college football for University of Washington, and earned consensus All-American honors. He was drafted by the Chicago Bears in the third round of the 1998 NFL draft and spent 13 seasons with Chicago where he was selected to six Pro Bowls. He also played four games for the New Orleans Saints in 2011. Kreutz was a semi-finalist for the Pro Football Hall of Fame in 2020 after being named to the 2000s All-Decade Team.

== Early life ==
Kreutz was born in Honolulu, Hawaii. He is the youngest of four sons born to Henry Kreutz Jr., of ʻAina Haina. He attended football powerhouse Saint Louis School in Honolulu, where he lettered in high school football, and was teammates with Dominic Raiola, who was two years behind him, and Chris Fuamatu-Maʻafala.

Kreutz also excelled in wrestling and track and field. He received All-State and SuperPrep All-America honors while serving as football team captain during his senior year, and would additionally go on to win the Hawaii state wrestling heavyweight championship.

== College career ==
Kreutz attended the University of Washington, where he played for the Washington Huskies football team under coach Jim Lambright. In 1996, Kreutz was involved in an altercation with defensive tackle Sekou Wiggs in spring practice. It continued in the lockerroom where Kreutz punched Wiggs, leaving Wiggs with a broken jaw. Wiggs lost 65 pounds as a result of having his jaw wired shut and never resumed his role as a starter. Kreutz was recognized as a consensus first-team All-American and earned Pac-10 honors during his junior year, after which he elected to turn pro.

On January 14, 2026, Kreutz was inducted into the College Football Hall of Fame.

== Professional career ==
Pre-draft measurables
Height	Weight	Arm length	Hand span	40-yard dash	10-yard split	20-yard split	20-yard shuttle	Three-cone drill	Vertical jump	Broad jump	Bench press
6 ft 2 1/8 in (1.88 m)	300 lb (136 kg)	31 1/2 in (0.80 m)	9 3/4 in (0.25 m)	5.32 s	1.78 s	2.99 s	4.55 s	8.10 s	28.0 in (0.71 m)	8 ft 4 in (2.54 m)	30 reps
All values from NFL Combine

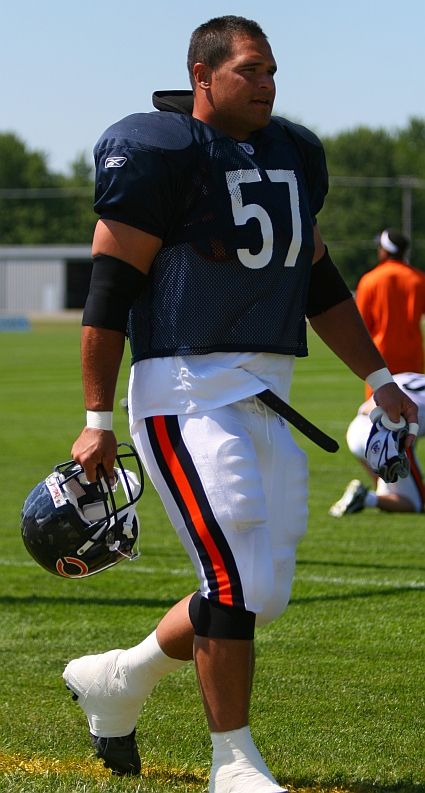
Olin Kreutz on July 27, 2007, at the Chicago Bears 2007 Training Camp.

=== NFL draft ===
According to Sports Illustrated, Kreutz was the No. 1 center available in the 1998 NFL draft. He was described as "a good technician" who "has all the physical tools to be a solid NFL player" while being able to "handle really big NT and DT." The Chicago Bears drafted Kreutz in the third round, 64th overall. He was the highest selected Washington interior lineman since Ed Cunningham in 1992. It was also the second consecutive year in which the Bears selected an offensive lineman from Washington, after Bob Sapp in 1997.

=== Chicago Bears ===
Over his thirteen-year career with the Bears, Kreutz was selected to six Pro Bowls, was selected once as a 1st team All-Pro, and was one of the team's most consistent offensive linemen. He started 182 regular-season games for the Bears, second only to Walter Payton.

In an incident eerily reminiscent of his college days, Kreutz drew controversy during the 2005 NFL season after breaking the jaw of fellow offensive lineman Fred Miller during an off-practice outing. The NFL fined both players $50,000. In October 2006, Kreutz was signed to a three-year contract extension through the 2010 season. In 2007, Kreutz was appointed as one of the team's captains.

In 2011, Kreutz chose to end his career with the Chicago Bears after turning down an offer of $4 million for one year. Kreutz was the longest tenured Bears member at the time he left the organization.

=== New Orleans Saints ===
On August 5, 2011, Kreutz signed with the New Orleans Saints for a one-year $2 million contract with an additional $2 million in incentives. Kreutz played in four of the Saints' first six games, missing the other two with a knee injury. He then decided to quit the team, saying that he had lost his "passion" for the game; the Saints were reportedly planning to move him to the "left team" list. In an interview, Kreutz cited offensive line coach Aaron Kromer's recurring expletive-laden tirades as the catalyst for his exit. A confrontation with Kromer resulted in Kreutz inadvertently throwing quarterback Drew Brees against a wall. After the incident, Kreutz stated, "it was time for me to go." He was waived after leaving the squad on October 22.

== Post-retirement ==
On August 19, 2015, Kreutz signed on to be in the WSCR 670 the Score Bears post game show along with James Williams and Hub Arkush, replacing the recently deceased Doug Buffone.

In 2019, Kreutz joined NBC Sports Chicago's Football Aftershow, serving as a Bears gameday analyst alongside Laurence Holmes and former teammates Lance Briggs, Alex Brown, and Matt Forte. Kreutz joined CHGO, a Chicago sports media start-up, in 2022 but was fired in May for physically assaulting Adam Hoge, a fellow employee. Kreutz later replied to a PR message from CHGO on Twitter with a Mike Tyson quote, "Social media made y'all way too comfortable with disrespecting people and not getting punched in the face for it." Kreutz later apologized to Hoge and revealed he was also leaving NBC Sports Chicago.

== Personal life ==
Kreutz is married to his high school sweetheart, Wendi; they have six children, including Josh Kreutz, and reside in Bannockburn, Illinois, but also have a winter home in Kalama Valley, Hawaii.
