= Michael J. Garanzini =

American priest

The Reverend Michael J. Garanzini S.J.

23rd President of Loyola University Chicago
- In office June 1, 2001 – June 30, 2015
- Preceded by: John J. Piderit, S.J.
- Succeeded by: John Peter Pelissero (interim)

Personal details
- Born: September 24, 1948 (age 77) St. Louis, Missouri
- Education: Saint Louis University; University of California, Berkeley
- Profession: Jesuit priest
- Website: Office of the President

Michael J. Garanzini, S.J. (born September 24, 1948, in Saint Louis, Missouri) is an American priest in the Society of Jesus of the Roman Catholic Church. He currently serves as President of both the International Association of Jesuit Universities and the US-based Association of Jesuit Colleges and Universities. From 2001 until 2015, Garanzini served as the twenty-third president of Loyola University Chicago in Chicago, Illinois, a member of the Association of Jesuit Colleges and Universities.

== Biography ==
After graduating from McBride High School in St. Louis, Garanzini attended Saint Louis University where he earned a Bachelor of Arts in Psychology in 1971, the same year that he entered the Society of Jesus. After spending years around the country and in Rome during his training and early years as a Jesuit, Garanzini received a doctorate in psychology and religion in 1986 from the University of California, Berkeley. Later that year, he returned to Saint Louis University, teaching as an associate professor of psychology and later serving as academic vice president. Garanzini was invited to Fordham University to serve as a visiting professor of counseling in 1998, and went on to work at Georgetown University until his presidency at Loyola. He has also taught at the Pontifical Gregorian University in Rome and at Regis College (now Regis University) in Denver.

Garanzini is the author of The Attachment Cycle: An Object Relations Approach to the Healing Ministries (1988), Meeting the Needs of Dysfunctional Families (1993), Child-Centered Schools: An Educator's Guide to Family Dysfunction (1995).

Garanzini previously served as a member of the Fairfield University Board of Trustees.

On July 1, 2015, Garanzini accepted appointment to the Chicago Board of Education.

== Awards ==
Garanzini was inducted as a laureate of The Lincoln Academy of Illinois and awarded the Order of Lincoln by the governor of Illinois in 2018.
