= Richard Mamiya =

American heart surgeon (1925–2019)

Richard Tsuruo Mamiya (Japanese: 間宮 鶴夫, March 8, 1925 – August 27, 2019) was a heart surgeon. He performed the first heart bypass operation in Hawaii.

== Early life and education ==
Mamiya was born on March 8, 1925, in Kalihi, Honolulu, Hawaii to Tsurumatsu and Margaret Mamiya. He was a third-generation Japanese American. He attended Saint Louis School on scholarship, where he played on the football, baseball, and basketball teams. He then earned an athletic scholarship to the University of Hawaii at Manoa, where he played as a quarterback. He had a reputation as a skilled athlete, and was later inducted into the UH Sports Hall of Honor. Mamiya also became student body president, and maintained high grades.

Mamiya's zoology professors encouraged him to go to medical school when he graduated in 1950. He studied medicine at St. Louis University School of Medicine, and specialized in heart surgery. After graduation, he worked for a short time at the St. Louis University, then returned to Hawaii.

== Career ==
Mamiya opened his practice in 1961. In 1965, he helped to establish the John A. Burns School of Medicine.

Mamiya performed the first coronary bypass in Hawaii at Queen's Hospital in 1970. During his career he reduced the amount of time the surgery took from four hours to two while maintaining a mortality rate of less than 1%. He performed more than 30,000 surgeries throughout his career.

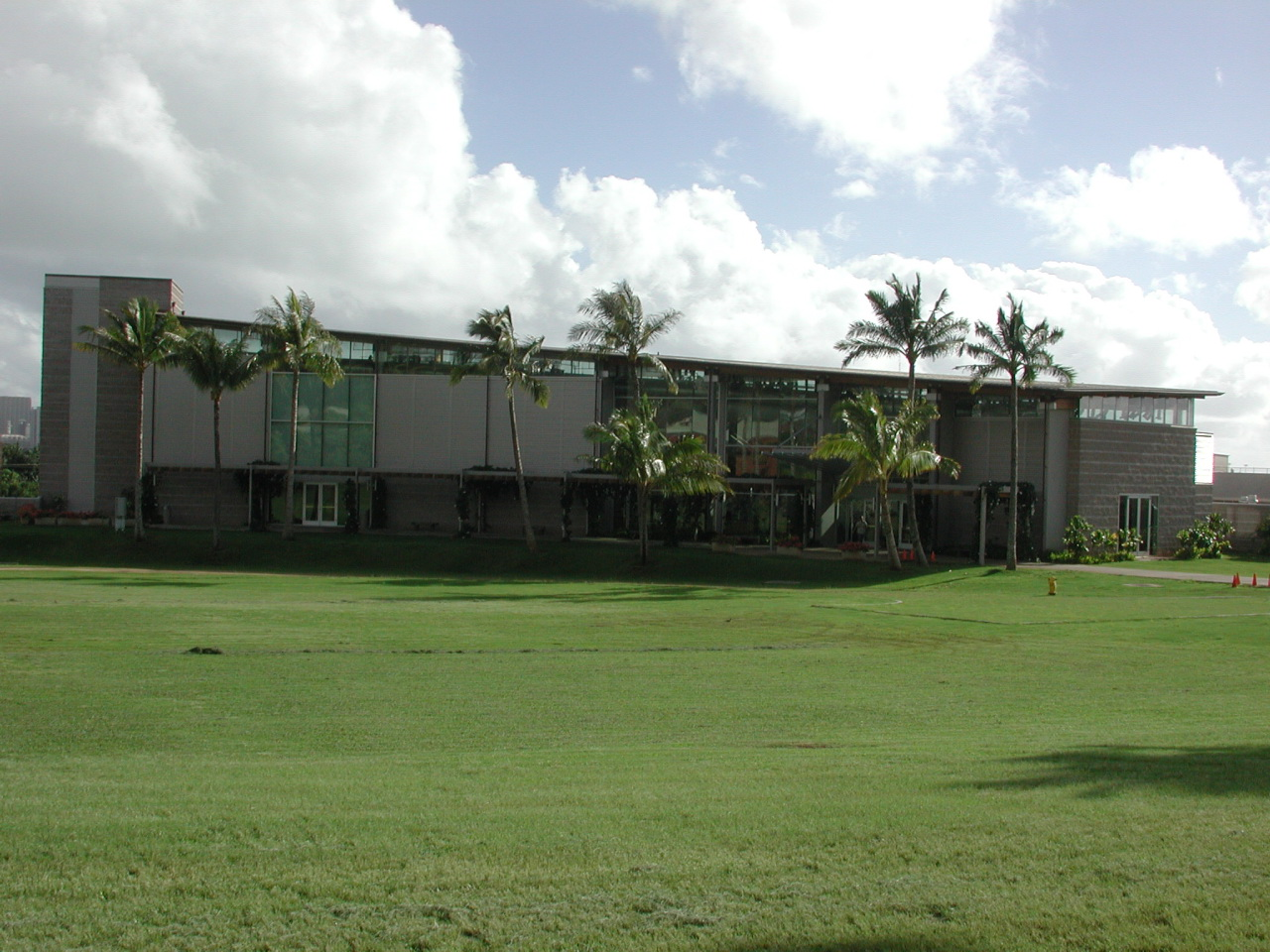
Richard T. Mamiya Science Adventure Center

Mamiya retired in 1995 and became a philanthropist. Several buildings in Hawaii bear his name, including a theater at Saint Louis School, the science center at the Bishop Museum, and the science center at Punahou School.

Mamiya died on August 27, 2019, at the age of 94.

== Personal life ==
Mamiya married Hazel M. Ikenaga in 1950, who died on March 23, 1996.

== Philanthropy ==
Mamiya's desire to give back to the community that supported him throughout his childhood and early adulthood resulted in donations to the following:

- Mamiya Science Center at Punahou School
- The Richard T. Mamiya Science Adventure Center at the Bishop Museum
- Richard T. Mamiya Medical Heritage Center at Queens Medical Center
- The Japanese Cultural Center
- Palama Settlement
- Holy Trinity Church
- The University of Hawaii
- The Honolulu Museum of Art
- Blood Bank of Hawaii
- The American Heart Association

Through the Richard T. Mamiya Charitable Foundation which he founded, many others have benefited from his charitable contributions.
