= Hawaii Business =

American business magazine

- Cover of the April 2018 issue
- Categories: Regional magazine, business magazine
- Frequency: Monthly
- Founded: 1955
- Company: PacificBasin Communications
- Country: United States
- Based in: Honolulu, Hawaii
- Language: English
- Website: www.hawaiibusiness.com
- ISSN: 0440-5056

Hawaii Business is a Honolulu-based business magazine founded in 1955. Its parent company, PacificBasin Communications, also publishes Honolulu Magazine, Hawaii Home + Remodeling, Island Family, Ala Moana magazine, Hawaii magazine and Japanese language visitor publication Hawaii Ai.

== History and profile ==
Founded in 1955, Hawaii Business is one of the oldest regional business magazines in America. Among its signature issues are the Best Places to Work (April), Hawaii Business Top 250, ranking Hawaii's largest companies (August); the Hawaii Business Black Book, profiling many senior executives of the Top 250 companies (December); Twenty People to Watch (March) and Top 100 Realtors (June).

The magazine's editorial content focuses on big issues concerning the state's major industries: tourism, construction, agriculture and real estate. The SmallBiz section, which runs every month, covers Hawaii's small businesses. Throughout the year, Hawaii Business produces business events and seminars aimed at the business community, with specific events tied to the signature issues. Events range from awards, to honoring specific individuals, to informative and educational forums and symposiums. In 2013, Bobby Senaha became the publisher of Hawaii Business.
