= Caleb Lomavita =

American baseball player (born 2002)

Washington Nationals
- Catcher
- Born: November 18, 2002 (age 23); Honolulu, Hawaii, U.S.
- Bats: Right Throws: Right
- Stats at Baseball Reference

Caleb Kaimi Kaleipomaikai Lomavita (born November 18, 2002) is an American professional baseball catcher in the Washington Nationals organization.

== Amateur career ==
Lomavita attended Saint Louis School in Honolulu, Hawaii, where he played baseball. He was named the Gatorade Hawaii Baseball Player of the year after his senior season in 2021. He attended the MLB Draft Combine, but went unselected in the 2021 Major League Baseball draft and enrolled at the University of California, Berkeley, to play college baseball for the California Golden Bears.

As a freshman for Cal in 2022, Lomavita appeared in 55 games and hit .272 with seven home runs and 46 RBI. After the season, he played collegiate summer baseball with the Cotuit Kettleers of the Cape Cod Baseball League, and was named a league all-star. As a sophomore in 2023, he batted .316 with 16 home runs and 43 RBI over 48 games. He returned to play for Cotuit and was named an All-Star for the second consecutive season. Lomavita opened the 2024 season as a top prospect for the upcoming MLB draft. Over 55 games, he batted .322 with 15 home runs and 52 RBI.

== Professional career ==
Lomavita was selected by the Washington Nationals with the 39th overall pick in the 2024 Major League Baseball draft. On July 24, 2024, he signed with the Nationals on a $2.33 million contract.

Lomavita made his professional debut in 2024 after signing with the Fredericksburg Nationals in the Single-A Carolina League and hit .213 over 17 games. He was assigned to the Wilmington Blue Rocks in the High-A South Atlantic League to open the 2025 season. Lomavita played in 99 games for the Blue Rocks, hitting .275 with four home runs and 44 RBI. He was promoted to the Harrisburg Senators of the Double-A Eastern League on August 26 and debuted with them the next day. Lomavita hit .273 with two home runs and three RBI in nine games with the team. He returned to Harrisburg for the 2026 season. Lomavita appeared in 85 games and batted .244 with 14 home runs and 51 RBI. He was transferred from the 7-day injured list to the 60-day injured list on September 13, effectively ending his season.
