= Honolulu (magazine) =

American monthly magazine

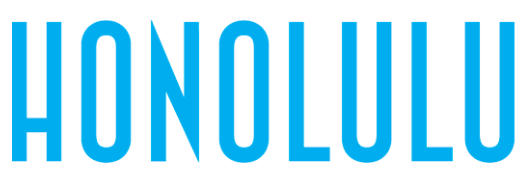

- Cover of the August 2017 issue
- Editor: Robbie Dingeman
- Frequency: Monthly
- Founded: 1888
- Company: PacificBasin Communications
- Country: United States
- Based in: Honolulu, Hawaii
- Website: www.honolulumagazine.com
- ISSN: 0441-2044

Honolulu is a city magazine covering Honolulu and the Hawaii region. It dates back to 1888 when it was called Paradise of the Pacific. It is the oldest magazine in the state of Hawaii and is the longest published magazine west of the Mississippi. Honolulu is a member of the City and Regional Magazine Association (CRMA).

== History ==
In 1888, when Hawaii was still a monarchy, King Kalākaua commissioned a magazine under royal charter to be Hawaii's ambassador to the world. That magazine was Paradise of the Pacific. For nearly a century, Paradise of the Pacific promoted local business and tourism by assuring citizens of the United States that the Islands were civilized. Noted contributors to Paradise of the Pacific included Henry B. Christian, Helen Thomas Dranga, Arman Manookian, and Edwin North McClellan.

In 1966, Paradise of the Pacific became Honolulu Magazine.

In 1977, David Pellegrin acquired it through his Honolulu Publishing Company and raised the bar for journalists in the islands. Honolulu shifted its focus to news and features aimed at an affluent residential audience. It covers dining, culture, arts, politics, entertainment in and around Honolulu and throughout Hawaii. Honolulu also has an annual dining awards called the Hale Aina Awards. Under Pellegrin in 1984, Honolulu established the awards as the islands' first local restaurant awards. Before then, culinary awards in the Islands had only been given by mainland travel interests.

In 2001, Duane Kurisu, the owner of PacificBasin Communications, acquired the magazine from the Honolulu Publishing Company. The company also publishes Hawaii Business, Hawaii Home and Remodeling, Hawaii, Honolulu Family, Lei Chic, Whalers Village and Honolulu Shops Waikiki.

Since 2004, Honolulu has held a photo contest which asks people to submit photos they have taken of Hawaii throughout the previous year.

Honolulu also has an annual statewide fiction contest, though the last contest took place in 2006.

As of 2017, Honolulu's owner, Duane Kurisu, who bought the magazines in 2001, also serves on the board of directors of Oahu Publications Inc.

== Awards ==
- 2015 – Sour Poi Awards
- 2016 – CRMA Award and National Prize
- 2017 – Sour Poi Awards
- 2018 – CRMA Awards

== See also ==
- Hawaii Business
