= John Jenkins (defensive back) =

American football player (born 1975)

No. 28
- Position: Safety

Personal information
- Born: May 11, 1975 (age 51); East McKeesport, Pennsylvania, U.S.
- Listed height: 6 ft 0 in (1.83 m)
- Listed weight: 188 lb (85 kg)

Career information
- High school: East Allegheny (North Versailles, Pennsylvania)
- College: Pittsburgh (1993–1997)
- NFL draft: 1998: undrafted

Career history
- Pittsburgh Steelers (1998)

Career NFL statistics
- Games played: 1
- Stats at Pro Football Reference

John Eric Jenkins (born May 11, 1975) is an American former professional football safety who played in the National Football League (NFL) for the Pittsburgh Steelers. He played college football for the Pittsburgh Panthers.

== Early life ==
Jenkins was born on May 11, 1975, in East McKeesport, Pennsylvania. He attended East Allegheny High School in North Versailles, Pennsylvania.

== College career ==
Jenkins played college football for the Pittsburgh Panthers from 1993 to 1997 and was a four-year letterman from 1994 to 1997. He redshirted his first season and in 1994, started to see more action as nickelback and on special teams. Jenkins had eight interceptions and 474 return yards in 42 games in his career.

== Professional career ==
After going unselected in the 1998 NFL draft, Jenkins signed with the Pittsburgh Steelers as an undrafted free agent. During the preseason he suffered a knee injury but had surgery and recovered in time to take part in training camp. On August 24, Jenkins was released by the team. On September 22, he was signed to the practice squad. On September 26, Jenkins was activated for the game against the Seattle Seahawks. He recorded no tackles and reverted to the practice squad on September 30. On October 6, Jenkins was released by the Steelers.
