= Chris Conrad (American football) =

American football player (born 1975)

No. 78
- Position: Offensive tackle

Personal information
- Born: May 27, 1975 (age 51); Fullerton, California, U.S.
- Listed height: 6 ft 6 in (1.98 m)
- Listed weight: 301 lb (137 kg)

Career information
- High school: Brea Olinda (Brea, California)
- College: Fresno State
- NFL draft: 1998: 3rd round, 66th overall pick

Career history
- Pittsburgh Steelers (1998–1999)

Career NFL statistics
- Games played: 17
- Games started: 4
- Stats at Pro Football Reference

Christopher Lee Conrad (born May 27, 1975) is an American former professional football player who was a tackle in the National Football League (NFL). He was selected by the Pittsburgh Steelers in the third round of the 1998 NFL draft. He played as an offensive tackle during his career for the Steelers. He is currently the offensive line coach at Slippery Rock University.
