= Henry B. Christian =

American painter

View of Manana Island, Oahu, oil on art board painting by Henry B. Christian, 1949

Henry B. Christian (1883–1953) was a painter who was born in Minneapolis, Minnesota. He studied at the Minneapolis Institute of Arts, and first visited Hawaii in 1908. He made frequent trips between Minnesota and Hawaii before settling in Honolulu. Christian was art director of Paradise of the Pacific 1908–10, 1917–19, and 1922–38. He died in Honolulu on December 23, 1953.
