= Carlos King =

American football player (born 1973)

No. 35
- Position: Running back

Personal information
- Born: November 25, 1973 (age 52); Garden Grove, California, U.S.
- Listed height: 6 ft 0 in (1.83 m)
- Listed weight: 230 lb (104 kg)

Career information
- High school: Hargrave Military Academy (Chatham, Virginia)
- College: NC State
- NFL draft: 1998: 4th round, 123rd overall pick

Career history
- Pittsburgh Steelers (1998); Denver Broncos (2000)*
- * Offseason or practice squad member only
- Stats at Pro Football Reference

Carlos Jermaine King (born November 25, 1973) is an American former professional football running back in the National Football League (NFL). He attended North Carolina State. He was selected in the fourth round of the 1998 NFL draft. King played in one game for the Pittsburgh Steelers in 1998.

== Personal life ==
King lives in North Carolina with his wife and two children. He runs a successful business that performs power washing and dryer vent and air duct cleaning.
