= Hale Aina Awards =

Annual dining awards

Hale Aina Awards are Honolulu Magazine's annual dining awards. The Hale Aina Awards are voted on by magazine readers and subscribers and published annually in the January issue of Honolulu.

The Hale Aina Awards are announced in November through a gala celebration where restaurant owners and chefs find out for the first time what award and at what level they have won.

Categories range from Best Restaurant by Island (Oahu, Kauai, Maui and Big Island) and Little Restaurant You Love to Best Hawaiian Cuisine and Most Romantic Restaurant.

== History ==
The Hale Aina Awards were created in 1984 by Honolulu Magazine. It was the first Hawaii dining award given by a local media company. Prior to that the only dining awards were given by mainland travel publications.

"Hale Aina" is the closest equivalent to the word "restaurant" in the Hawaiian language. It literally means "eating place" and is now mostly synonymous with these awards.

== Restaurant of the Year ==
Restaurant of the Year is the highest honor bestowed each year to one Hawaii restaurant. Alan Wong's Restaurant holds the most Hale Aina Award Restaurant of the Year wins.

== Past winners ==
1985 - The Third Floor
1986 - Michel's at the Colony Surf
1987 - Michel's at the Colony Surf
1988 - Matteo's
1989 - Michel's at the Colony Surf
1990 - Bali by the Sea
1991 - Golden Dragon
1992 - Maile Restaurant
1993 - Maile Restaurant
1994 - 3660 On the Rise
1995 - Roy's
1996 - Alan Wong's
1997 - Alan Wong's
1998 - Hoku's
1999 - Alan Wong's
2000 - Alan Wong's
2001 - Alan Wong's
2002 - Roy's
2003 - Hoku's
2004 - Roy's
2005 - Alan Wong's
2006 - Alan Wong's
2007 - Alan Wong's
2008 - Alan Wong's
2009 - Alan Wong's
2010 - Roy's
2011 - Roy's
