= Society of Mary =

Society of Mary may refer to:

- Society of Mary (Marists), a Catholic religious congregation of priests and brothers, founded in 1816 at Lyon, France, by Father Jean-Claude Colin and others.
- Marist Brothers, a Catholic religious congregation of brothers with affiliated lay people founded in France, at La Valla near Lyon in 1817 by Saint Marcellin Champagnat, a young French priest of the Society of Mary. Though the two congregations have common origins they are not the same.
- Society of Mary (Marianists), a Catholic religious congregation of brothers and priests, founded in 1817 at Bordeaux, France, by the Blessed William Joseph Chaminade.
- Society of Mary (Anglican), an Anglican society founded in 1931 in Britain, by the union of its parent societies, the Confraternities of Our Lady (founded in 1880) and the League of Our Lady (founded in 1902)

== See also ==
- Congregation of Marian Fathers of the Immaculate Conception (Marianie in Polish)
