= Chris Fuamatu-Maʻafala =

American football player (born 1977)

Chris Fuamatu-Ma'afala
No. 45
- Position: Running back

Personal information
- Born: March 4, 1977 (age 49); Honolulu, Hawaii, U.S.
- Listed height: 6 ft 0 in (1.83 m)
- Listed weight: 252 lb (114 kg)

Career information
- High school: Saint Louis (Honolulu)
- College: Utah
- NFL draft: 1998: 6th round, 178th overall pick

Career history
- Pittsburgh Steelers (1998–2002); Jacksonville Jaguars (2003–2004)

Awards and highlights
- WAC Freshman of the Year (1995)

Career NFL statistics
- Rushing yards: 964
- Rushing average: 4.2
- Rushing touchdowns: 8
- Receptions: 43
- Receiving yards: 351
- Receiving touchdowns: 2
- Stats at Pro Football Reference

Chris Fuamatu-Ma'afala ([fu.əˈmatu maʔəˈfalə]; born March 4, 1977) is an American former professional football player who was a fullback for the Pittsburgh Steelers and Jacksonville Jaguars of the National Football League (NFL). He played college football for the Utah Utes. He was selected by the Steelers in the sixth round of the 1998 NFL draft.

== Early life ==
Fuamatu-Ma'afala was born and raised in Kalihi, Hawaii. He grew up in the island of Oahu's most notorious housing project known for murders, gangs, and illegal drug activities, Mayor Wrights Housing. He utilized his athletic abilities as a means of staying away from negative influences. He attended Princess Ka'iulani Elementary School and Central Intermediate School.

Fuamatu-Ma'afala attended Saint Louis School in Honolulu. As a senior, he rushed for 883 yards on just 93 carries (9.5 yards per car. avg.). He was selected as MVP honors, and helped lead his team to its ninth consecutive state championship.

== College career ==
=== Freshman (1995) ===
At the University of Utah in 1995, Fuamatu-Ma'afala was named Freshman of the Year in the Western Athletic Conference (WAC) after rushing for 834 yards and nine touchdowns for the Utes.

=== Sophomore (1996) ===
In 1996, Fuamatu-Ma'afala rushed for 982 yards on 168 carries and nine touchdowns, and he made 10 receptions for 80 yards, to finish fourth on the team in receiving, while appearing in only eight games for the Utes.

The 1996 season opened with three consecutive road games. During the season opening loss at the Utah State Aggies, Fuamatu-Ma'afala carried the ball 14 times for 49 yards. He also recorded two receptions for 17 yards. Utah went on to win the next seven consecutive games. Against the Stanford Cardinal, Fuamatu-Ma'afala rushed the ball 21 times for 64 yards and a three-yard touchdown. During the game at the SMU Mustangs, Fuamatu-Ma'afala carried the ball 21 times for 92 yards. In the home opener against the Fresno State Bulldogs, Fuamatu-Ma'afala rushed the ball 29 times for 169 yards. Against the Kansas Jayhawks, Fuamatu-Ma'afala carried the ball 17 times for 103 yards and two touchdowns. In the game against the UTEP Miners, Fuamatu-Ma'afala carried the ball 28 times for a season high 236 yards, and three touchdowns, while recording two receptions for 23 yards. The 236 rushing yards was the second-highest single-game total in school history (Eddie Johnson rushed for 248 yards in a game in 1984). During the win over the TCU Horned Frogs, Fuamatu-Ma'afala rushed the ball 20 times for 182 yards and two touchdowns, one a career long 70 yards. On October 18, 1996, the day before the Utes victory over Tulsa, Fuamatu-Ma'afala underwent knee surgery, and missed the next three games, returning to play in the regular season finale against the BYU Cougars. Against the Cougars, Fuamatu-Ma'afala rushed the ball 18 times for 87 yards and one touchdown. Two days after Christmas in the Copper Bowl loss to the Wisconsin Badgers, he carried the ball only four times for five yards before suffering a sprained ankle in the first quarter of play. For his efforts, he was named First-team All-WAC.

=== Junior (1997) ===
In 1997, Fuamatu-Ma'afala had somewhat of a down season, due to being hampered most of the season by an injured left ankle, and a strained hamstring. He rushed for only 814 yard on 154 carries and four touchdowns, which was good enough for second best on the team, behind Juan Johnson, and 12th in the WAC. He also finished seventh on the team in receiving with four receptions for 39 yards and one touchdown. Fuamatu-Ma'afala, was however named All-WAC (Mountain Division) Honorable Mention.

== Professional career ==
=== Pittsburgh Steelers ===
Fuamatu-Ma'afala was selected in the sixth round (178th overall) of the 1998 NFL draft by the Pittsburgh Steelers.

In 1998, Fuamatu-Ma'afala played in 12 games for the Steelers. In his rookie season, he carried the ball seven times for 30 yards and two touchdowns; he also made nine receptions for 84 yards and one touchdown.

In 1999, Fuamatu-Ma'afala appeared in only nine games. On the season, he rushed the ball one time for four yards, and had zero receptions. His lone carry of the season came against the first meeting of the season between the Pittsburgh Steelers and the Cincinnati Bengals.

In 2000, Fuamatu-Ma'afala played in seven games for the Steelers. In his seven games he carried the ball 21 times for 149 yards and one touchdown. He also had 11 receptions for 107 yards. Fuamatu-Ma'afala did not play until week three, and did not play again after week eight.

In his first appearance of the season during week three's loss to the Cleveland Browns, Fuamatu-Ma'afala carried the ball twice for 22 yards, and also recorded two receptions for eight yards. In the week four loss to the Tennessee Titans, he carried the ball four times for 21 yards, and also recorded three receptions for 36 yards. During the Steelers week five win over the Jacksonville Jaguars, Fuamatu-Ma'afala rushed the ball seven times for 51 yards and one touchdown. He also had two receptions for 39 yards. In the week six victory over the New York Jets, he had seven carries for 35 yards, and also recorded two touchdowns for 23 yards. During the week seven win over the Bengals, Fuamatu-Ma'afala recorded two receptions for one yard. In his final appearance of the season, Fuamatu-Ma'afala rushed the ball one time for 20 yards.

In 2001, Fuamatu-Ma'afala had the best season of his professional career. He appeared in all 16 games for Pittsburgh. On the season, he rushed the ball 120 times, for 453 yards, and three touchdowns. He also had 16 receptions for 127 yards and one touchdown.

In the season opening loss to the Jaguars, Fuamatu-Ma'afala recorded one reception for seven yards. During a week three win over the Buffalo Bills, he carried the ball one time for a 22-yard touchdown, and two receptions for two yards. Fuamatu-Ma'afala missed the next two games, returning for the Steelers win over the Titans. During the win, he carried the ball three times for nine yards. In the Steelers loss to the Ravens, Fuamatu-Ma'afala rushed the ball three times for three yards, and also recorded two receptions for eight yards. During the week nine win over the Cleveland Browns, he carried the ball one time for -1 yard. In a week 10 victory over the Jaguars, Fuamatu-Ma'afala ran the ball one time for one yard. During the week 11 rematch win over the Titans, he carried the ball one time for one yard. In a week 12 victory over the Minnesota Vikings, Fuamatu-Ma'afala ran the ball 12 times for 74 yards. During the week 13 win over the Jets, he rushed the ball 21 times for 50 yards for one touchdown, and also recorded one reception for -8 yards. In the week 14 win in Baltimore, Fuamatu-Ma'afala carried the ball nine times for 15 yards, and recorded one reception for zero yards. During the win over the Detroit Lions, he had his best game of the season, running the ball 26 times for 126 yards, and recorded two receptions for 53 yards. In a loss in Cincinnati, Fuamatu-Ma'afala carried the ball 25 times for 55 yards, and recorded five receptions for 50 yards and one touchdown. In the season finale against the Browns, he recorded 17 carries for 98 yards and one touchdown. He also recorded two receptions for 15 yards.

In 2002, his last season in Pittsburgh, Fuamatu-Ma'afala played in only eight games. On the season he carried the ball 23 times for 115 yards. He also recorded two receptions for 12 yards.

In the season opening loss to the New England Patriots, Fuamatu-Ma'afala recorded one reception for six yards. He missed the next game against the Kansas City Chiefs. Fuamatu-Ma'afala returned to play in the week four win over the Cleveland Browns, carrying the ball five times for 20 yards. He missed the next two weeks, returning to play in weeks seven and eight. During week seven against the Indianapolis Colts, Fuamatu-Ma'afala carried the ball two times for 25 yards. In week eight against the Baltimore Ravens, he rushed the ball eight times for 21 yards. Fuamatu-Ma'afala missed the next eight weeks, returning to play in the season finale against the Ravens. In the season finale he ran the ball eight times for 49 yards, and recorded one reception for six yards.

During the Steelers AFC Wild Card 36–33 win against the Browns, Fuamatu-Ma'afala carried the ball twice for four yards, including the go-ahead touchdown with 53 seconds remaining; he also recorded two receptions for 20 yards. In the AFC Divisional Championship loss to the Titans, he recorded one reception for five yards.

On particular occasions when he was involved in a crucial play, Chris Berman would often parody the Isaac Hayes classic "Theme From Shaft" by saying "He's a Bad Ma'afala!" on the highlight show NFL Primetime. This would be followed by Tom Jackson saying "shut your mouth!" like the 1971 hit.

Fuamatu-Ma'afala was released by the Steelers on August 31, 2003.

=== Jacksonville Jaguars ===
On September 3, 2003, Fuamatu-Ma’afala was signed by the Jacksonville Jaguars.

In 2003, Fuamatu-Ma'afala appeared in 13 games for the Jaguars. For the season, he carried the ball 35 times for 144 yards and one touchdown. He also recorded one reception for two yards.

Fuamatu-Ma'afala missed the season opener against the Carolina Panthers. He made his season debut during week two against the Buffalo Bills, however he did not record a stat until week five against the San Diego Chargers. During week five against the Chargers, Fuamatu-Ma'afala ran the ball six times for 30 yards. In week six against the Miami Dolphins, he carried the ball three times for 11 yards. In a week eight loss to the Tennessee Titans, Fuamatu-Ma'afala rushed the ball one time for six yards, and recorded one reception for two yards. During a week nine victory in Baltimore, he carried the ball four times for 24 yards. In the week 10 win over the Colts, Fuamatu-Ma'afala rushed the ball four times for 11 yards. During a week 11 loss to the Titans, he ran the ball nine times for 40 yards. In the Steelers week 12 loss to the New York Jets, he carried the ball twice for two yards. During the week 13 win over the Tampa Bay Buccaneers, Fuamatu-Ma'afala rushed the ball once for five yards. Fuamatu-Ma'afala did not play the next two weeks, against the Houston Texans, and the New England Patriots. He did return to play in the last two games of the season. During a week 16 win over the New Orleans Saints, Fuamatu-Ma'afala ran the ball five times for 15 yards. In the season finale he played but did not record a stat.

In 2004, his seventh and final season in the National Football League, Fuamatu-Ma'afala appeared in only seven games. He carried the ball 20 times for 69 yards, and one touchdown. He also recorded four receptions for 19 yards.

In his final season in the NFL, Fuamatu-Ma'afala missed the first four weeks of the season, making his season debut during a week five loss in San Diego. Against the Chargers, he carried the ball four times for six yards and one touchdown, he also recorded three receptions for 20 yards. In a week six win over the Kansas City Chiefs, he recorded one reception for -1 yard. Fuamatu-Ma'afala was out the next three games, against the Colts, Texans and Detroit Lions. He returned during a week 11 loss to the Tennessee Titans, where he carried the ball three times for 12 yards. In the week 12 loss against the Minnesota Vikings, Fuamatu-Ma'afala ran the ball twice for two yards. During a week 13 loss to his former team, the Steelers, Fuamatu-Ma'afala carried the ball six times for 20 yards. He missed the next two games, to return in time for week 16. In the week 16 shut out loss to the Texans, Fuamatu-Ma'afala carried the ball four times for 25 yards. During the season finale against the Oakland Raiders, and the last regular season game of his career, Fuamatu-Ma'afala carried the ball once for four yards.

=== Career statistics ===
Pro. Career Off. Statistics			Rushing					Fumbles	
Year	Team	G	Att	Yards	AVG	LNG	TD	FUM	LOST
1998	Pittsburgh Steelers	12	7	30	4.3	10	2	0	0
1999	Pittsburgh Steelers	9	1	4	4.0	4	0	0	0
2000	Pittsburgh Steelers	7	21	149	7.1	23	1	0	0
2001	Pittsburgh Steelers	16	120	453	3.8	46	3	0	0
2002	Pittsburgh Steelers	8	23	115	5.0	17	0	0	0
2003	Jacksonville Jaguars	13	35	144	4.1	18	1	0	0
2004	Jacksonville Jaguars	7	20	69	3.5	10	1	0	0
Total		72	227	964	4.2	46	8	0	0

Pro. Career Off. Statistics			Receiving				
Year	Team	G	Rec	Yards	Y/R	TD	LNG
1998	Pittsburgh Steelers	12	9	84	9.3	1	26
1999	Pittsburgh Steelers	9	0	0	0	0	0
2000	Pittsburgh Steelers	7	11	107	9.7	0	25
2001	Pittsburgh Steelers	16	16	127	7.9	1	54
2002	Pittsburgh Steelers	8	2	12	6.0	0	6
2003	Jacksonville Jaguars	13	1	2	2.0	0	2
2004	Jacksonville Jaguars	7	4	19	4.8	0	8
Total		72	43	351	8.2	2	54

== Personal life ==
Fuamatu-Ma'afala is the uncle of Abu Ma'afala, who played at Cal. He is also the uncle of Josh Simmons, who plays in the NFL for the Kansas City Chiefs.

Fuamatu-Ma'afala currently resides in Honolulu, and works with Army Youth Sports, coaching and organizing sports events for children of military personnel and playing Racquetball with local enthusiasts.

He would be cheered by Steeler Fans with a "Fu'ing" which to the casual listener may sound like booing. But what the fans did was simply shout the first syllable of his last name, creating a "Fuuuuuuuuuuu" sound. This started with Myron Cope's calling of Chris "Foo" when he would go on the field.

ESPN personality Stuart Scott often referred to Fumatu-Ma'afala as "a bad Ma'afala" when featuring one of his highlights.

In order to be a positive role model for youth throughout Hawaii and serve the community, Fuamatu-Ma'afala holds an annual sports clinic for youth to improve on their basic athletic abilities and works in other ways to help teens choose positive activities.
