= List of Florida State Seminoles in the NFL draft =

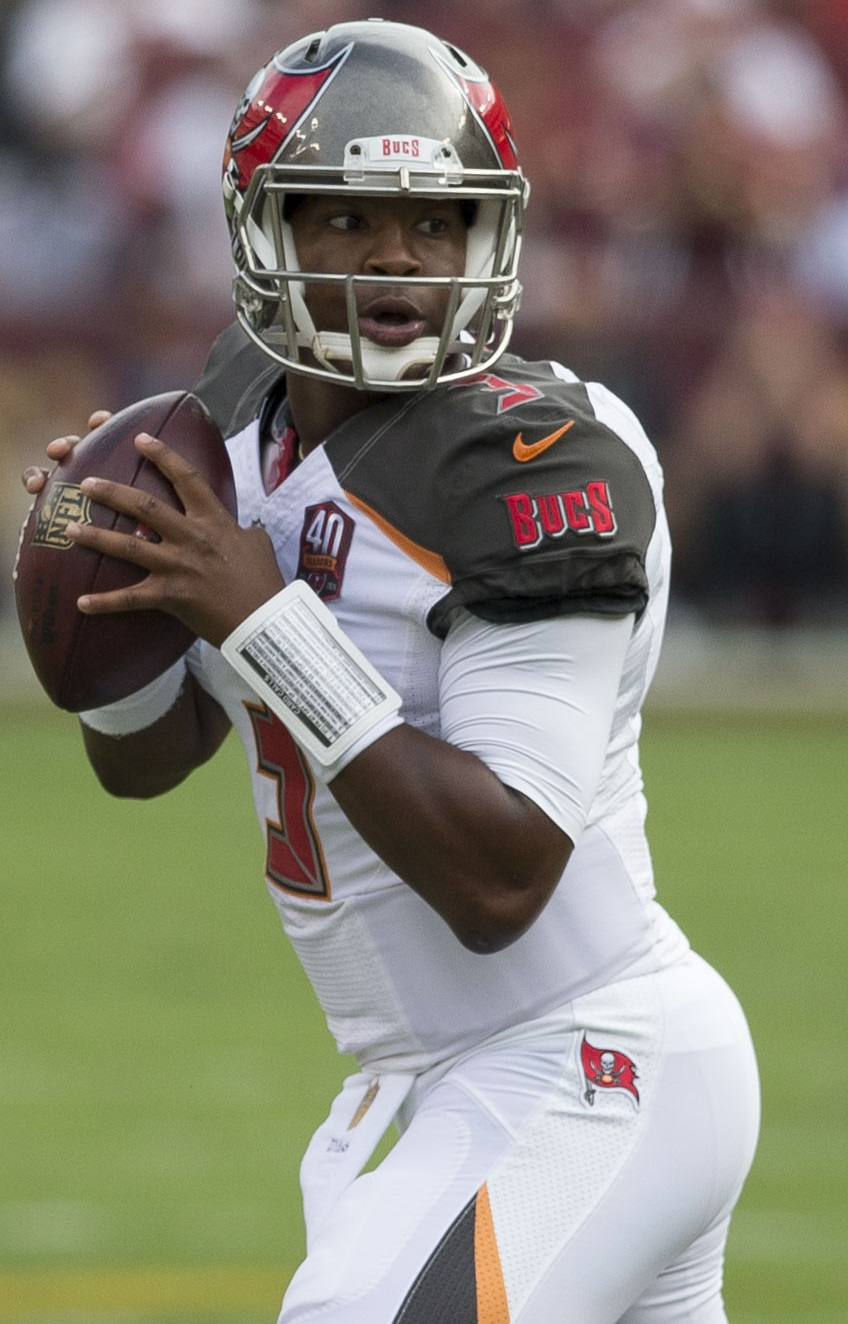
Jameis Winston is the highest draft pick in school history, being drafted first overall in the 2015 NFL draft.

This is a list of Florida State Seminoles in the NFL draft. Florida State has had a draft pick in forty-three consecutive drafts.

== Drafts ==
Key

B	Back	K	Kicker	NT	Nose tackle
C	Center	LB	Linebacker	FB	Fullback
DB	Defensive back	P	Punter	HB	Halfback
DE	Defensive end	QB	Quarterback	WR	Wide receiver
DT	Defensive tackle	RB	Running back	G	Guard
E	End	T	Offensive tackle	TE	Tight end

=== 1951 ===
Name	Position	Team	Round	Pick
Wayne Benner	B	Cleveland Browns	24th	291
Bill Driver	B	Cleveland Browns	29th	351

=== 1952 ===
Name	Position	Team	Round	Pick
Roy Thompson	B	Cleveland Browns	12th	144

=== 1954 ===
Name	Position	Team	Round	Pick
Bobby Fiveash	RB	San Francisco 49ers	16th	191
Tom Feamster	OT	Chicago Bears	25th	294
Bill Mote	T	New York Giants	29th	340

=== 1955 ===
Name	Position	Team	Round	Pick
Tom Feamster	OT	Los Angeles Rams	4th	40
Bill Proctor	OL	Cleveland Browns	20th	241

=== 1956 ===
Name	Position	Team	Round	Pick
Jerry Jacobs	OG	Pittsburgh Steelers	19th	220

=== 1958 ===
Name	Position	Team	Round	Pick
Ron Schomburger	OL	Washington Redskins	23rd	270

=== 1961 ===
Name	Position	Team	Round	Pick
Tony Romeo	TE	Washington Redskins	19th	255

=== 1962 ===
Name	Position	Team	Round	Pick
Don Donatelli	C	St. Louis Cardinals	18th	243
Ed Trancygier	QB	Washington Redskins	20th	267

=== 1964 ===
Name	Position	Team	Round	Pick
Bill Dawson	TE	Los Angeles Rams	12th	161

=== 1966 ===
Name	Position	Team	Round	Pick
Jack Shinholser	LB	Washington Redskins	9th	131st
Jim Mankins	FB	Green Bay Packers	12th	184th

=== 1967 ===
Name	Position	Team	Round	Pick
Del Williams	C	New Orleans Saints	3rd	79
Larry Kissam	T	Miami Dolphins	17th	422

=== 1968 ===
Name	Position	Team	Round	Pick
Kim Hammond	QB	Miami Dolphins	6th	142
Lane Fenner	FL	San Diego Chargers	7th	183
Thurston Taylor	TE	Philadelphia Eagles	12th	312
Bill Moreman	RB	New York Giants	14th	368
Wayne McDuffie	C	Cleveland Browns	17th	455

=== 1969 ===
Name	Position	Team	Round	Pick
Ron Sellers	SE	Boston Patriots	1st	6
Chip Glass	TE	Cleveland Browns	3rd	72
Bill Rhodes	G	St. Louis Cardinals	4th	97
Walt Sumner	DB	Cleveland Browns	7th	176
Dale McCullers	LB	Miami Dolphins	12th	297

=== 1970 ===
Name	Position	Team	Round	Pick
Bill Cappleman	QB	Minnesota Vikings	2nd	51
Grant Guthrie	K	Buffalo Bills	6th	135
Jeff Curchin	OT	Chicago Bears	6th	136
Phil Abraira	DB	Chicago Bears	15th	366

=== 1971 ===
Name	Position	Team	Round	Pick
Tom Bailey	RB	Philadelphia Eagles	10th	256

=== 1972 ===
Name	Position	Team	Round	Pick
Rhett Dawson	WR	Houston Oilers	10th	240
Richard Amman	DE	Dallas Cowboys	10th	260
Kent Gaydos	TE	Oakland Raiders	12th	306

=== 1973 ===
Name	Position	Team	Round	Pick
Barry Smith	WR	Green Bay Packers	1st	21
J.T. Thomas	DB	Pittsburgh Steelers	1st	24
Gary Huff	QB	Chicago Bears	2nd	33
Eddie McMillan	DB	Los Angeles Rams	4th	95
Charlie Hunt	LB	San Francisco 49ers	10th	253
Gary Parris	TE	San Diego Chargers	15th	372

=== 1974 ===
Name	Position	Team	Round	Pick
Buzzy Lewis	DB	Baltimore Colts	17th	436

=== 1975 ===
Name	Position	Team	Round	Pick
Bert Cooper	LB	New York Jets	12th	299

=== 1976 ===
Name	Position	Team	Round	Pick
Greg Johnson	DT	Philadelphia Eagles	5th	135
Randy Coffield	LB	Seattle Seahawks	10th	266
Lee Nelson	DB	St. Louis Cardinals	15th	420
Eddie McMillan	DB	Seattle Seahawks	expansion	expansion
Barry Smith	WR	Tampa Bay	expansion	expansion

=== 1977 ===
Name	Position	Team	Round	Pick
Gary Woolford	DB	Houston Oilers	6th	148
Steve Mathieson	QB	Detroit Lions	9th	236

=== 1978 ===
Name	Position	Team	Round	Pick
Bobby Jackson	DB	New York Jets	6th	141
Louis Richardson	DE	New York Jets	10th	254
Larry Key	RB	Green Bay Packers	10th	256
Nat Terry	DB	Pittsburgh Steelers	11th	279

=== 1979 ===
Name	Position	Team	Round	Pick
Willie Jones	DE	Oakland Raiders	2nd	42
Nate Henderson	T	St. Louis Cardinals	11th	283

=== 1980 ===
Name	Position	Team	Round	Pick
Mark Lyles	RB	Cincinnati Bengals	8th	196
Jackie Flowers	WR	Dallas Cowboys	9th	246
Walter Carter	DT	Oakland Raiders	10th	264
Jimmy Jordan	QB	New England Patriots	12th	320

=== 1981 ===
Name	Position	Team	Round	Pick
Bobby Butler	DB	Atlanta Falcons	1st	25
Ken Lanier	T	Denver Broncos	5th	125
Ron Simmons	DT	Cleveland Browns	6th	160
Paul Piurowski	LB	Dallas Cowboys	8th	218
Bill Capece	K	Houston Oilers	12th	324

=== 1982 ===
Name	Position	Team	Round	Pick
Rohn Stark	P	Baltimore Colts	2nd	34
Ron Hester	LB	Miami Dolphins	6th	164
Mike Whiting	RB	Dallas Cowboys	11th	304

=== 1984 ===
Name	Position	Team	Round	Pick
Alphonso Carreker	DE	Green Bay Packers	1st	12
Weegie Thompson	WR	Pittsburgh Steelers	4th	108

=== 1985 ===
Name	Position	Team	Round	Pick
Jessie Hester	WR	Los Angeles Raiders	1st	23
Greg Allen	RB	Cleveland Browns	2nd	35
Billy Allen	RB	New Orleans Saints	4th	95
Eric Riley	DB	Denver Broncos	8th	222
Roosevelt Snipes	RB	San Francisco 49ers	8th	supplemental draft

=== 1986 ===
Name	Position	Team	Round	Pick
Hassan Jones	WR	Minnesota Vikings	5th	120
John Ionata	G	Dallas Cowboys	9th	242
Cletis Jones	RB	New England Patriots	10th	276
Garth Jax	LB	Dallas Cowboys	11th	296
Jesse Solomon	LB	Minnesota Vikings	12th	318
Isaac Williams	DT	Indianapolis Colts	12th	326

=== 1987 ===
Name	Position	Team	Round	Pick
Gerald Nichols	NT	New York Jets	7th	187

=== 1988 ===
Name	Position	Team	Round	Pick
Pat Carter	TE	Detroit Lions	2nd	32
Paul McGowan	LB	Minnesota Vikings	9th	237
Martin Mayhew	CB	Buffalo Bills	10th	262
Danny McManus	QB	Kansas City Chiefs	11th	282

=== 1989 ===
Name	Position	Team	Round	Pick
Deion Sanders	DB	Atlanta Falcons	1st	5
Sammie Smith	RB	Miami Dolphins	1st	9
Pat Tomberlin	G	Indianapolis Colts	4th	99
Marion Butts	RB	San Diego Chargers	7th	183
Victor Floyd	RB	San Diego Chargers	11th	287
Stan Shiver	DB	Green Bay Packers	12th	310

=== 1990 ===
Name	Position	Team	Round	Pick
Dexter Carter	RB	San Francisco 49ers	1st	25
LeRoy Butler	DB	Green Bay Packers	2nd	48
Peter Tom Willis	QB	Chicago Bears	3rd	63
Ron Lewis	WR	San Francisco 49ers	3rd	68
Eric Hayes	DT	Seattle Seahawks	5th	119
Odell Haggins	DT	San Francisco 49ers	9th	248
Terry Anthony	WR	Tampa Bay Buccaneers	11th	281

=== 1991 ===
Name	Position	Team	Round	Pick
Reggie Johnson	TE	Denver Broncos	2nd	30
Lawrence Dawsey	WR	Tampa Bay Buccaneers	3rd	66
Anthony Moss	LB	New York Giants	5th	139
Richie Andrews	PK	Detroit Lions	6th	151
Hayward Haynes	OG	New Orleans Saints	7th	182

=== 1992 ===
Name	Position	Team	Round	Pick
Terrell Buckley	DB	Green Bay Packers	1st	5
Amp Lee	RB	San Francisco 49ers	2nd	45
Howard Dinkins	LB	Atlanta Falcons	3rd	73
Casey Weldon	QB	Philadelphia Eagles	4th	102
Edgar Bennett	RB	Green Bay Packers	4th	103
Brad Johnson	QB	Minnesota Vikings	9th	227

=== 1993 ===
Name	Position	Team	Round	Pick
Marvin Jones	LB	New York Jets	1st	4
Carl Simpson	DT	Chicago Bears	2nd	35
Dan Footman	DE	Cleveland Browns	2nd	42
Reggie Freeman	LB	New Orleans Saints	2nd	53
Sterling Palmer	DE	Washington Redskins	4th	101
Shannon Baker	WR	Atlanta Falcons	8th	205

=== 1994 ===
Name	Position	Team	Round	Pick
William Floyd	FB	San Francisco 49ers	1st	28
Lonnie Johnson	TE	Buffalo Bills	2nd	61
Corey Sawyer	DB	Cincinnati Bengals	4th	104
Sean Jackson	RB	Houston Oilers	4th	129
Kevin Knox	WR	Buffalo Bills	6th	192
Toddrick McIntosh	DT	Dallas Cowboys	7th	216

=== 1995 ===
Name	Position	Team	Round	Pick
Derrick Alexander	DE	Minnesota Vikings	1st	11
Devin Bush	DB	Atlanta Falcons	1st	26
Derrick Brooks	LB	Tampa Bay Buccaneers	1st	28
Corey Fuller	DB	Minnesota Vikings	2nd	55
Zack Crockett	RB	Indianapolis Colts	3rd	79
Tamarick Vanover	WR	Kansas City Chiefs	3rd	81
Chris Cowart	LB	San Diego Chargers	4th	100
Clifton Abraham	DB	Tampa Bay Buccaneers	5th	143
Kez McCorvey	WR	Detroit Lions	5th	156
'Omar Ellison	WR	San Diego Chargers	5th	162

=== 1996 ===
Name	Position	Team	Round	Pick
Clay Shiver	C	Dallas Cowboys	3rd	67
Danny Kanell	QB	New York Giants	4th	130
Phillip Riley	WR	Philadelphia Eagles	6th	199
Orpheus Roye	DE	Pittsburgh Steelers	6th	200

=== 1997 ===
Name	Position	Team	Round	Pick
Peter Boulware	DE	Baltimore Ravens	1st	4
Walter Jones	OT	Seattle Seahawks	1st	6
Warrick Dunn	RB	Tampa Bay Buccaneers	1st	12
Reinard Wilson	DE	Cincinnati Bengals	1st	14
Henri Crockett	LB	Atlanta Falcons	4th	100
Vernon Crawford	LB	New England Patriots	5th	159
Byron Capers	DB	Philadelphia Eagles	7th	225

=== 1998 ===
Name	Position	Team	Round	Pick
Andre Wadsworth	DL	Arizona Cardinals	1st	3
Tra Thomas	OT	Philadelphia Eagles	1st	11
Sam Cowart	OLB	Buffalo Bills	2nd	39
Samari Rolle	CB	Tennessee Oilers	2nd	46
E. G. Green	WR	Indianapolis Colts	3rd	71
Greg Spires	DE	New England Patriots	3rd	83
Julian Pittman	DT	New Orleans Saints	4th	99
Shevin Smith	SS	Tampa Bay Buccaneers	6th	184
Kevin Long	C	Tennessee Oilers	7th	229

=== 1999 ===
Name	Position	Team	Round	Pick
Tony Bryant	DE	Oakland Raiders	2nd	40
Larry Smith	DT	Jacksonville Jaguars	2nd	56
Dexter Jackson	FS	Tampa Bay Buccaneers	4th	113
Lamarr Glenn	FB	Tampa Bay Buccaneers	6th	195

=== 2000 ===
Name	Position	Team	Round	Pick
Peter Warrick	WR	Cincinnati Bengals	1st	4
Corey Simon	NG	Philadelphia Eagles	1st	6
Sebastian Janikowski	PK	Oakland Raiders	1st	17
Ron Dugans	WR	Cincinnati Bengals	3rd	66
Laveranues Coles	WR	New York Jets	3rd	78
Jerry Johnson	DT	Denver Broncos	4th	101
Mario Edwards	CB	Dallas Cowboys	6th	180

=== 2001 ===
Name	Position	Team	Round	Pick
Jamal Reynolds	DE	Green Bay Packers	1st	10
Derrick Gibson	DB	Oakland Raiders	1st	28
Tommy Polley	LB	St. Louis Rams	2nd	42
Tay Cody	CB	San Diego Chargers	3rd	67
Snoop Minnis	WR	Kansas City Chiefs	3rd	77
Brian Allen	LB	St. Louis Rams	3rd	83
Travis Minor	RB	Miami Dolphins	3rd	85
Chris Weinke	QB	Carolina Panthers	4th	106
Char-ron Dorsey	OT	Dallas Cowboys	7th	242

=== 2002 ===
Name	Position	Team	Round	Pick
Javon Walker	WR	Green Bay Packers	1st	20
Chris Hope	FS	Pittsburgh Steelers	3rd	94

=== 2003 ===
Name	Position	Team	Round	Pick
Anquan Boldin	WR	Arizona Cardinals	2nd	54
Alonzo Jackson	DE	Pittsburgh Steelers	2nd	59
Montrae Holland	OG	New Orleans Saints	4th	102
Brett Williams	OT	Kansas City Chiefs	4th	113
Todd Williams	OG	Tennessee Titans	7th	225
Talman Gardner	WR	New Orleans Saints	7th	231

=== 2004 ===
Name	Position	Team	Round	Pick
Michael Boulware	LB	Seattle Seahawks	2nd	53
Greg Jones	RB	Jacksonville Jaguars	2nd	55
Darnell Dockett	DT	Arizona Cardinals	3rd	64
Kendyll Pope	LB	Indianapolis Colts	4th	107
P. K. Sam	WR	New England Patriots	5th	164

=== 2005 ===
Name	Position	Team	Round	Pick
Travis Johnson	DT	Houston Texans	1st	16
Alex Barron	OT	St. Louis Rams	1st	19
Bryant McFadden	CB	Pittsburgh Steelers	2nd	62
Ray Willis	OT	Seattle Seahawks	4th	105
Craphonso Thorpe	WR	Kansas City Chiefs	4th	116
Jerome Carter	S	St. Louis Rams	4th	117
Chauncey Davis	DE	Atlanta Falcons	4th	128
Eric Moore	DE	New York Giants	6th	186

=== 2006 ===
Name	Position	Team	Round	Pick
Ernie Sims	LB	Detroit Lions	1st	9
Kamerion Wimbley	DE	Cleveland Browns	1st	13
Brodrick Bunkley	DT	Philadelphia Eagles	1st	14
Antonio Cromartie	CB	San Diego Chargers	1st	19
Willie Reid	WR	Pittsburgh Steelers	3rd	95
Leon Washington	RB	New York Jets	4th	117
Pat Watkins	S	Dallas Cowboys	5th	138
A. J. Nicholson	LB	Cincinnati Bengals	5th	157

=== 2007 ===
Name	Position	Team	Round	Pick
Lawrence Timmons	LB	Pittsburgh Steelers	1st	15
Buster Davis	LB	Arizona Cardinals	3rd	69
Lorenzo Booker	RB	Miami Dolphins	3rd	71
Mario Henderson	OL	Oakland Raiders	3rd	91
Chris Davis	WR	Tennessee Titans	4th	128

=== 2008 ===
Name	Position	Team	Round	Pick
Andre Fluellen	DT	Detroit Lions	3rd	87
Letroy Guion	DT	Minnesota Vikings	5th	152
Geno Hayes	LB	Tampa Bay Buccaneers	6th	175

=== 2009 ===
Name	Position	Team	Round	Pick
Everette Brown	DE	Carolina Panthers	2nd	43

=== 2010 ===
Name	Position	Team	Round	Pick
Patrick Robinson	CB	New Orleans Saints	1st	32
Myron Rolle	S	Tennessee Titans	6th	207
Dekoda Watson	LB	Tampa Bay Buccaneers	7th	217

=== 2011 ===
Name	Position	Team	Round	Pick
Christian Ponder	QB	Minnesota Vikings	1st	12
Rodney Hudson	OL	Kansas City Chiefs	2nd	55
Markus White	DE	Washington Redskins	7th	224

=== 2012 ===
Name	Position	Team	Round	Pick
Nigel Bradham	LB	Buffalo Bills	4th	105
Zebrie Sanders	T	Buffalo Bills	5th	144
Mike Harris	CB	Jacksonville Jaguars	6th	176
Andrew Datko	OL	Green Bay Packers	7th	241

=== 2013 ===
Name	Position	Team	Round	Pick
EJ Manuel	QB	Buffalo Bills	1st	16
Björn Werner	DE	Indianapolis Colts	1st	24
Xavier Rhodes	CB	Minnesota Vikings	1st	25
Tank Carradine	DE	San Francisco 49ers	2nd	40
Menelik Watson	OL	Oakland Raiders	2nd	42
Chris Thompson	RB	Washington Redskins	5th	154
Brandon Jenkins	DE	Washington Redskins	5th	162
Dustin Hopkins	K	Buffalo Bills	6th	177
Nick Moody	LB	San Francisco 49ers	6th	180
Vince Williams	LB	Pittsburgh Steelers	6th	206
Everett Dawkins	DT	Minnesota Vikings	7th	229

=== 2014 ===
Name	Position	Team	Round	Pick
Kelvin Benjamin	WR	Carolina Panthers	1st	28
Lamarcus Joyner	DB	St. Louis Rams	2nd	41
Timmy Jernigan	DT	Baltimore Ravens	2nd	48
Terrence Brooks	DB	Baltimore Ravens	3rd	79
Devonta Freeman	RB	Atlanta Falcons	4th	103
Bryan Stork	OL	New England Patriots	4th	105
Telvin Smith	LB	Jacksonville Jaguars	5th	144

=== 2015 ===
Name	Position	Team	Round	Pick
Jameis Winston	QB	Tampa Bay Buccaneers	1st	1
Cameron Erving	C	Cleveland Browns	1st	19
Mario Edwards Jr.	DE	Oakland Raiders	2nd	35
Eddie Goldman	DT	Chicago Bears	2nd	39
Ronald Darby	DB	Buffalo Bills	2nd	50
P. J. Williams	DB	New Orleans Saints	3rd	78
Tre' Jackson	G	New England Patriots	4th	111
Rashad Greene	WR	Jacksonville Jaguars	5th	139
Karlos Williams	RB	Buffalo Bills	5th	155
Nick O'Leary	TE	Buffalo Bills	6th	194
Bobby Hart	OT	New York Giants	7th	226

=== 2016 ===
Name	Position	Team	Round	Pick
Jalen Ramsey	DB/S	Jacksonville Jaguars	1st	5
Roberto Aguayo	K	Tampa Bay Buccaneers	2nd	59

=== 2017 ===
Name	Position	Team	Round	Pick
Dalvin Cook	RB	Minnesota Vikings	2nd	41
DeMarcus Walker	DE	Denver Broncos	2nd	51
Roderick Johnson	OT	Cleveland Browns	5th	160
Marquez White	CB	Dallas Cowboys	6th	216

=== 2018 ===
Name	Position	Team	Round	Pick
Derwin James	S	Los Angeles Chargers	1st	17
Derrick Nnadi	DT	Kansas City Chiefs	3rd	75
Rick Leonard	OT	New Orleans Saints	4th	127
Josh Sweat	DE	Philadelphia Eagles	4th	130
Ryan Izzo	TE	New England Patriots	7th	250
Auden Tate	WR	Cincinnati Bengals	7th	253

=== 2019 ===
Name	Position	Team	Round	Pick
Brian Burns	LB	Carolina Panthers	1st	16
Demarcus Christmas	DT	Seattle Seahawks	6th	209

=== 2020 ===
Name	Position	Team	Round	Pick
Cam Akers	RB	Los Angeles Rams	2nd	52

=== 2021 ===
Name	Position	Team	Round	Pick
Asante Samuel Jr.	CB	Los Angeles Chargers	2nd	47
Janarius Robinson	DE	Minnesota Vikings	4th	134
Joshua Kaindoh	DE	Kansas City Chiefs	4th	144
Hamsah Nasirildeen	S	New York Jets	6th	186

=== 2022 ===
Name	Position	Team	Round	Pick
Jermaine Johnson II	DE	New York Jets	1st	26

=== 2023 ===
Name	Position	Team	Round	Pick
Jammie Robinson	S	Carolina Panthers	5th	145

=== 2024 ===
Name	Position	Team	Round	Pick
Jared Verse	DE	Los Angeles Rams	1st	19
Keon Coleman	WR	Buffalo Bills	2nd	33
Braden Fiske	DT	Los Angeles Rams	2nd	39
Renardo Green	CB	San Francisco 49ers	2nd	64
Trey Benson	RB	Arizona Cardinals	3rd	66
Jarrian Jones	CB	Jacksonville Jaguars	3rd	96
Jordan Travis	QB	New York Jets	5th	171
Johnny Wilson	WR	Philadelphia Eagles	6th	185
Jaheim Bell	TE	New England Patriots	7th	231
Tatum Bethune	LB	San Francisco 49ers	7th	251

=== 2025 ===
Name	Position	Team	Round	Pick
Azareye'h Thomas	DB	New York Jets	3rd	73
Joshua Farmer	DL	New England Patriots	4th	137

=== 2026 ===
Name	Position	Team	Round	Pick
Darrell Jackson Jr.	DL	New York Jets	4th	103

== Pro Football Hall of Fame inductees ==
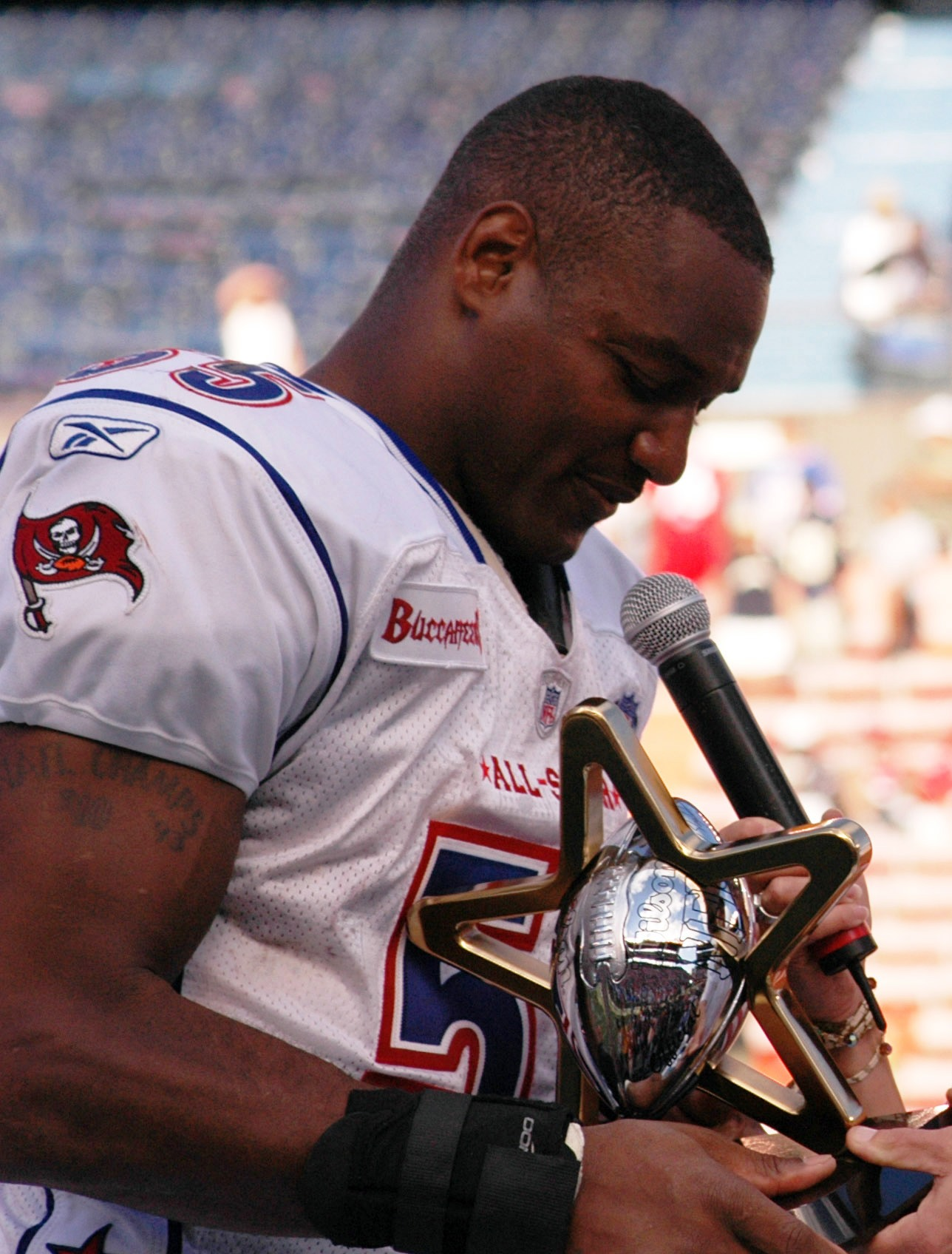
Derrick Brooks was drafted in the first round by the Buccaneers where he would win a championship in 2002.

Pro Football Hall of Fame inductees
Year Inducted	Name	Position	Career
1988	Fred Biletnikoff	WR	1965–1978
2011	Deion Sanders	CB	1989–2000, 2004–2005
2014	Derrick Brooks	LB	1995–2008
2014	Walter Jones	OL	1997–2008
2022	LeRoy Butler	S	1990–2001
