= 1996 All-America college football team =

Official list of the best college football players of 1996

The 1996 All-America college football teamis composed of college football players who were selected as All-Americans by various organizations and writers that chose College Football All-America Teams in 1996. The National Collegiate Athletic Association (NCAA) recognizes seven selectors as "official" for the 1996 season. They are: (1) the Associated Press (AP), (2) the American Football Coaches Association (AFCA), (3) Football News, (4) the Football Writers Association of America (FWAA) selected by the nation's football writers; (5) The Sporting News (TSN); the United Press International (UPI) - in its last year as a selector - selected based on the votes of sports writers at UPI newspapers; and the Walter Camp Football Foundation (WC).

The College Football All-America Team is an honor given annually to the best American college football players at their respective positions. The original usage of the term All-America seems to have been to such a list selected by football pioneer Walter Camp in the 1890s. The NCAA has officially recognized All-Americans selected by over a changing roster of over 20 organizations. In 1995, the official selectors were the AP, UPI, AFCA, FWAA, WCFF, TSN, and FN to determine Consensus All-Americans.

The Newspaper Enterprise Association (NEA), the oldest All-American college football selection at the time and once an official selector, also selected a team - the last one they selected.

A player is named to the Consensus team if they are selected first team by a majority of the recognized All-America teams, in this case 4. If no player at a position meets that majority threshold, a player can still qualify by earning first-team honors from at least two of the designated selectors. Second- and third-team honors are used as tie-breakers, and if a true tie remains, all tied players are included.

== Offense ==
=== Quarterback ===
- Danny Wuerffel, Florida (College Football Hall of Fame) (AP-1, AFCA-Coaches, Walter Camp, TSN, FN, NEA-1)
- Jake Plummer, Arizona St. (AP-2, FWAA-Writers, NEA-2)
- Peyton Manning, Tennessee (AP-3)

=== Running backs ===
- Byron Hanspard, Texas Tech (AP-1, AFCA-Coaches, FWAA-Writers, Walter Camp, TSN, FN)
- Troy Davis, Iowa State (College Football Hall of Fame) (AP-1, FWAA-Writers, Walter Camp, TSN, FN, NEA-1)
- Warrick Dunn, Florida St. (AP-2, FWAA-Writers, NEA-1)
- Darnell Autry, Northwestern (AP-2, AFCA-Coaches, NEA-2)
- Ron Dayne, Wisconsin (College Football Hall of Fame) (AP-3)
- Corey Dillon, Washington (AP-3)
- Tiki Barber, Virginia (NEA-2)

=== Wide receivers ===
- Marcus Harris, Wyoming (AP-1, AFCA-Coaches, FWAA-Writers, Walter Camp, FN, NEA-1)
- Ike Hilliard, Florida (AP-3, AFCA-Coaches, FWAA-Writers, Walter Camp, FN, NEA-2)
- Reidel Anthony, Florida (AP-1, TSN, NEA-2)
- Rae Carruth, Colorado (AP-2, TSN, NEA-1)
- Keith Poole, Arizona State (AP-2)
- Kevin Lockett, Kansas St. (AP-3)

=== Tight end ===
- David LaFleur, LSU (AP-3, Walter Camp, NEA-1)
- Tony Gonzalez, California (AP-2, TSN, FN, NEA-2)
- Itula Mili, BYU (AFCA-Coaches)
- Pat Fitzgerald, Texas (AP-1)

=== Guards/tackles ===
- Orlando Pace, Ohio St. (College Football Hall of Fame) (AP-1, AFCA-Coaches, FWAA-Writers, Walter Camp, TSN, FN, NEA-1)
- Juan Roque, Arizona St. (AP-1, AFCA-Coaches, FWAA-Writers, Walter Camp, FN, NEA-1)
- Benji Olson, Washington (AP-1, TSN, FN)
- Scott Sanderson, Washington State (AP-3, TSN, NEA-2)
- Chris Naeole, Colorado (AP-1, AFCA-Coaches, Walter Camp, FN, NEA-1)
- Dan Neil, Texas (AP-2, AFCA-Coaches, FWAA-Writers, Walter Camp, TSN, NEA-1)
- Steve Scifres, Wyoming (AP-2, FWAA-Writers, NEA-2)
- Chris Dishman, Nebraska (AP-2)
- Walter Jones, Florida St. (AP-2)
- Ben Kaufman, Texas Tech (AP-3)
- Adam Meadows, Georgia (AP-3)
- Jerry Wunsch, Wisconsin (AP-3)
- Jamie Nails, Florida A&M (NEA-2)
- Paul Wiggins, Oregon (NEA-2)

=== Center ===
- Aaron Taylor, Nebraska (AP-2, FWAA-Writers, Walter Camp, FN, NEA-1)
- Rod Payne, Michigan (AFCA-Coaches)
- K. C. Jones, Miami (Fla.) (AP-1)
- Billy Conaty, Virginia Tech (TSN)
- Jeff Mitchell, Florida (AP-3)
- Ryan Tucker, Texas Christian (NEA-2)

== Defense ==
=== Linemen ===
- Grant Wistrom, Nebraska (College Football Hall of Fame) (AP-1, AFCA-Coaches, FWAA-Writers, TSN, FN, NEA-1)
- Reinard Wilson, Florida St. (AP-1, AFCA-Coaches, Walter Camp, FWAA-Writers, NEA-1)
- Peter Boulware, Florida St. (AP-1, FWAA-Writers, TSN, FN, NEA-1)
- Mike Vrabel, Ohio State (AP-2, AFCA-Coaches, Walter Camp, NEA-2)
- Derrick Rodgers, Arizona St. (AP-1, FWAA-Writers, NEA-1)
- Jared Tomich, Nebraska (AP-2, Walter Camp, NEA-2)
- Cornell Brown, Virginia Tech (AP-2, Walter Camp, NEA-2)
- Michael Myers, Alabama (TSN)
- Tarek Saleh, Wisconsin (FN)
- William Carr, Michigan (AP-2)
- Greg Ellis, North Carolina (AP-3)
- Leonard Little, Tennessee (AP-3)
- Darrell Russell, USC (AP-3, NEA-2)

=== Linebackers ===
- Canute Curtis, West Virginia (AP-1, AFCA-Coaches-DL, FWAA-Writers, TSN, FN, NEA-1)
- Pat Fitzgerald, Northwestern (College Football Hall of Fame) (AP-1, AFCA-Coaches, FWAA-Writers, Walter Camp, FN, NEA-1)
- Jarrett Irons, Michigan (AP-1, AFCA-Coaches, Walter Camp, NEA-2)
- Matt Russell, Colorado (AP-1, FWAA-Writers, Walter Camp, TSN)
- Jason Chorak, Washington (AP-3 {as DL], TSN, FN)
- Dwayne Rudd, Alabama (AP-2, AFCA-Coaches)
- Anthony Simmons, Clemson (AP-3, TSN)
- Keith Mitchell, Texas A&M (AP-3, FN)
- Andy Katzenmoyer, Ohio St. (AP-2)
- Brian Simmons, North Carolina (AP-2)
- Takeo Spikes, Auburn (AP-2)
- Tyrus McCloud, Louisville (AP-3)
- Antwaune Ponds, Syracuse (AP-3)
- James Farrior, Virginia (NEA-2)

=== Backs ===
- Chris Canty, Kansas St. (AP-1, AFCA-Coaches, FWAA-Writers, Walter Camp, TSN, FN, NEA-1)
- Dré Bly, North Carolina (College Football Hall of Fame) (AP-1, FWAA-Writers, Walter Camp, TSN, NEA-1)
- Charles Woodson, Michigan (College Football Hall of Fame) (AP-1, FWAA-Writers, NEA-1)
- Shawn Springs, Ohio St. (AP-2, AFCA-Coaches, Walter Camp, FN, NEA-2)
- Kevin Jackson, Alabama (AP-1, AFCA-Coaches, FWAA-Writers, Walter Camp, TSN, FN, NEA-1)
- Kim Herring, Penn State (AP-2, TSN, NEA-2)
- Kevin Abrams, Syracuse (AFCA-Coaches)
- Sam Madison, Louisville (AP-3, FN, NEA-2)
- Bryant Westbrook, Texas (AP-2, NEA-2)
- Kenny Wheaton, Oregon (AP-2)
- Eric Allen, Indiana (AP-3)
- Ronde Barber, Virginia (AP-3)
- Steve Rosga, Colorado (AP-3)

== Specialists ==
=== Placekicker ===
- Marc Primanti, N.C. St. (AP-1, FWAA-Writers, TSN, FN, NEA-1)
- Cory Wedel, Wyoming (AFCA-Coaches, Walter Camp)
- Rafael Garcia, Virginia (AP-2)
- Damon Shea, Nevada (AP-3)
- Phil Dawson, Texas (NEA-2)

=== Punter ===
- Noel Prefontaine, San Diego St. (AP-1, FWAA-Writers, NEA-2)
- Brad Maynard, Ball State (AP-2, AFCA, Coaches, Walter Camp, NEA-1)
- Bill Marrinangle, Vanderbilt (TSN)
- Toby Gowin, North Texas (AP-3)

=== All-purpose / kick returners ===
- Tim Dwight, Iowa (FWAA-Writers)
- Kevin Faulk, LSU (AP-1)
- Terry Battle, Arizona St. (AP-2, TSN)
- Beau Morgan, Air Force (AP-3)

== See also ==
- 1996 All-Atlantic Coast Conference football team
- 1996 All-Big 12 Conference football team
- 1996 All-Big Ten Conference football team
- 1996 All-Pacific-10 Conference football team
- 1996 All-SEC football team
