= 1996 All-Atlantic Coast Conference football team =

American college football all-star team

The 1996 All-Atlantic Coast Conference football team consists of American football players chosen by various selectors for their All-Atlantic Coast Conference ("ACC") teams for the 1996 college football season. Selectors in 1996 included the Associated Press (AP).

== Offensive selections ==
=== Wide receivers ===
- Harvey Middleton, Georgia Tech (AP-1)
- Andre Cooper, Florida State (AP-1)
- Desmond Clark, Wake Forest (AP-2)
- E.G. Green, Florida State (AP-2)

=== Tackles ===
- Curtis McGee, Georgia Tech (AP-1)
- Jim Bundren, Clemson (AP-1)
- Todd Fordham, Florida State (AP-2)
- Walter Jones, Florida State (AP-2)

=== Guards ===
- Chad Bates, Florida State (AP-1)
- Jeremy Raley, Virginia (AP-1)
- Glenn Roundtree, Clemson (AP-2)
- Lonnie Gilbert, NC State (AP-2)

=== Centers ===
- Jeff Saturday, North Carolina (AP-1)
- Jamie Trimble, Clemson (AP-2)

=== Tight ends ===
- Freddie Jones, North Carolina (AP-1)
- Lamont Hall, Clemson (AP-2)

=== Quarterbacks ===
- Chris Keldorf, North Carolina (AP-1)
- Thad Busby, Florida State (AP-2)

=== Running backs ===
- Tiki Barber, Virginia (AP-1)
- Warrick Dunn, Florida State (AP-1)
- Raymond Priester, Clemson (AP-2)
- Leon Johnson, North Carolina (AP-2)

=== Specialists ===
- Leon Johnson, North Carolina (AP-1)
- Tiki Barber, Virginia (AP-2)

== Defensive selections ==
=== Defensive linemen ===
- Peter Boulware, Florida State (AP-1)
- Reinard Wilson, Florida State (AP-1)
- Greg Ellis, North Carolina (AP-1)
- Trevor Pryce, Clemson (AP-1)
- Duane Ashman, Virginia (AP-2)
- Todd White, Virginia (AP-2)
- Rick Terry, North Carolina (AP-2)
- Andre Wadsworth, Florida State (AP-2)

=== Linebackers ===
- Anthony Simmons, Clemson (AP-1)
- Jamie Sharper, Virginia (AP-1)
- Brian Simmons, North Carolina (AP-1)
- Daryl Bush, Florida State (AP-2)
- Kivuusama Mays, North Carolina (AP-2)
- James Farrior, Virginia (AP-2)

=== Defensive backs ===
- Dre Bly, North Carolina (AP-1)
- Ronde Barber, Virginia (AP-1)
- Anthony Poindexter, Virginia (AP-1)
- Byron Capers, Florida State (AP-1)
- Omar Brown, North Carolina (AP-2)
- Robert Williams, North Carolina (AP-2)
- Dexter McCleon, Clemson (AP-2)
- Nate Perryman, Georgia Tech (AP-2)

== Special teams ==
=== Placekickers ===
- Marc Primanti, NC State (AP-1)
- Rafael Garcia, Virginia (AP-2)

=== Punters ===
- Will Brice, Virginia (AP-1)
- John Krueger, Duke (AP-2)

== Key ==
AP = Associated Press

== See also ==
1996 College Football All-America Team
