= 1995 All-Atlantic Coast Conference football team =

American college football all-star team

The 1995 All-Atlantic Coast Conference football team consists of American football players chosen by various selectors for their All-Atlantic Coast Conference ("ACC") teams for the 1995 college football season. Selectors in 1995 included the Associated Press (AP).

Four teams dominated the AP's 1995 All-ACC selections:

- Conference champion Florida State finished the season ranked No. 4 in the final AP Poll and placed seven players on the first team: quarterback Danny Kanell, running back Warrick Dunn, wide receiver Andre Cooper, offensive tackle Jesus Hernandez, offensive guard Lewis Tyre, center Clay Shiver, and defensive lineman Reinard Wilson.
- Virginia finished the season ranked No. 16 in the final AP Poll and placed six players on the first team: running back Tiki Barber, offensive tackle Jason Augustino, defensive backs Percy Ellsworth and Ronde Barber, placekicker Rafael Garcia, and punter Will Brice.
- Clemson finished in third place in the conference and placed four players on the first team: offensive guard Will Young, linebacker Anthony Simmons, defensive back Brian Dawkins, and defensive lineman Lamarick Simpson.
- Fifth-place North Carolina also placed four players on the first team: tight end Freddie Jones, linebacker Kivuusama Mays, defensive linemen Marcus Jones and Greg Ellis.

== Offensive selections ==
=== Wide receivers ===
- Andre Cooper, Florida State (AP-1)
- Jermaine Lewis, Maryland (AP-1)
- Octavus Barnes, North Carolina (AP-2)
- E. G. Green, Florida State (AP-2)

=== Tackles ===
- Jesus Hernandez, Florida State (AP-1)
- Jason Augustino, Virginia (AP-1)
- Dwayne Morgan, Clemson (AP-2)
- Chris Harrison, Virginia (AP-2)

=== Guards ===
- Lewis Tyre, Florida State (AP-1)
- Will Young, Clemson (AP-1)
- Steve Keim, NC State (AP-2)
- Jonathan Redmond, NC State (AP-2)

=== Centers ===
- Clay Shiver, Florida State (AP-1)
- Michael Cheever, Georgia Tech (AP-2)

=== Tight ends ===
- Freddie Jones, North Carolina (AP-1)
- Jeff Hodrick, Duke (AP-2)
- Bill Khayat, Duke (AP-2)

=== Quarterbacks ===
- Danny Kanell, Florida State (AP-1)
- Mike Groh, Virginia (AP-2)

=== Running backs ===
- Warrick Dunn, Florida State (AP-1)
- Tiki Barber, Virginia (AP-1)
- Raymond Priester, Clemson (AP-2)
- C. J. Williams, Georgia Tech (AP-2)

== Defensive selections ==
=== Defensive linemen ===
- Marcus Jones, North Carolina (AP-1)
- Reinard Wilson, Florida State (AP-1)
- Greg Ellis, North Carolina (AP-1)
- Lamarick Simpson, Clemson (AP-1)
- Todd White, Virginia (AP-2)
- Andre Wadsworth, Florida State (AP-2)
- Al Jackson, Georgia Tech (AP-2)
- Eric Ogbogu, Maryland (AP-2)

=== Linebackers ===
- Anthony Simmons, Clemson (AP-1)
- Kivuusama Mays, North Carolina (AP-1)
- Tucker Grace, Wake Forest (AP-1)
- Ron Rogers, Georgia Tech (AP-2)
- James Farrior, Virginia (AP-2)
- Daryl Bush, Florida State (AP-2)

=== Defensive backs ===
- Percy Ellsworth, Virginia (AP-1)
- Brian Dawkins, Clemson (AP-1)
- Ray Farmer, Duke (AP-1)
- Ronde Barber, Virginia (AP-1)
- Andreal Johnson, Maryland (AP-2)
- Nate Perryman, Georgia Tech (AP-2)
- Leomont Evans, Clemson (AP-2)
- Byron Capers, Florida State (AP-2)

== Special teams ==
=== Placekickers ===
- Rafael Garcia, Virginia (AP-1)
- Jeff Sauve, Clemson (AP-2)

=== Punters ===
- Will Brice, Virginia (AP-1)
- Sean Liss, Florida State (AP-2)

== Key ==
AP = Associated Press

== See also ==
1995 College Football All-America Team
