= Andre Cooper =

American football player (born 1975)

No. 81
- Position: Wide receiver

Personal information
- Born: June 21, 1975 (age 51); Camden, South Carolina, U.S.
- Listed height: 6 ft 2 in (1.88 m)
- Listed weight: 210 lb (95 kg)

Career information
- High school: Duncan U. Fletcher (Neptune Beach, Florida)
- College: Florida State
- NFL draft: 1997: undrafted

Career history
- Seattle Seahawks (1997)*; Denver Broncos (1998–2000); Arizona Cardinals (2001)*; Colorado Crush (2003)
- * Offseason or practice squad member only

Awards and highlights
- Super Bowl champion (XXXIII); National champion (1993); 2× First-team All-ACC (1995, 1996)

Career NFL statistics
- Receptions: 9
- Yards: 98
- TDs: 0
- Stats at Pro Football Reference

Andre Damon Cooper (born June 21, 1975) is an American former professional football player who was a wide receiver for the Denver Broncos of the National Football League (NFL). He played college football for the Florida State Seminoles before signing as a free agent in 1997 by the NFL's Seattle Seahawks. He was later signed to the Broncos developmental squad in 1998, before being active the entire 1999 season.

== Early life ==
Cooper attended Duncan U. Fletcher High School in Neptune Beach, Florida. While attending high school he was a member of the football and basketball teams. He was voted runner-up "Mr. Basketball" in the state of Florida as well as "Mr. Football" in class 5A. He was a USA Today first-team All American.

== College career ==
Cooper attended Florida State University. He was a contributing member of the 1993 national championship team his freshman year. Cooper was a First-team All Atlantic Coast Conference selection at Wide Receiver in 1995 and 1996. He was also named Most Valuable Player in the 1996 Orange Bowl, in which Florida State defeated the University of Notre Dame. Cooper was inducted into the Orange Bowl Hall of Fame in 2014. His 15 touchdowns in 1995 is a FSU single season record.

== Professional career ==
Cooper signed as an undrafted free agent with the Seattle Seahawks in 1997. After being released during training camp, he signed with the Denver Broncos in 1998. Cooper was a member of the Denver Broncos development squad for the entire 1998 season as the team won back to back Super Bowl titles. In 1999, Cooper was elevated to the active roster of the Denver Broncos after leading the National Football League in receptions and receiving yards in the preseason. During the regular season, Cooper caught 9 passes for 98 yards. In 2000, Cooper was released by the Denver Broncos after the 4th game of the regular season. Cooper signed with the Arizona Cardinals of the National Football League in 2001 but was waived during training camp.
