= 1997 All-Atlantic Coast Conference football team =

American college football all-star team

The 1997 All-Atlantic Coast Conference football team consists of American football players chosen by various selectors for their All-Atlantic Coast Conference ("ACC") teams for the 1997 college football season. Selectors in 1997 included the Associated Press (AP).

== Offensive selections ==
=== Wide receivers ===
- E. G. Green, Florida State (AP-1)
- Torry Holt, NC State (AP-1)
- Peter Warrick, Florida State (AP-2)
- Tony Horne, Clemson (AP-2)

=== Tackles ===
- Jim Bundren, Clemson (AP-1)
- Tra Thomas, Florida State (AP-1)
- Ken Celaj, Georgia Tech (AP-2)
- Doug Karczewski, Virginia (AP-2)

=== Guards ===
- Lonnie Gilbert, NC State (AP-1)
- Glenn Rountree, Clemson (AP-1)
- Jason Whitaker, Florida State (AP-2)
- Chad Melita, Duke (AP-2)

=== Centers ===
- Jeff Saturday, North Carolina (AP-1)
- Kevin Long, Florida State (AP-2)

=== Tight ends ===
- Melvin Pearsall, Florida State (AP-1)
- Alge Crumpler, North Carolina (AP-2)

=== Quarterbacks ===
- Thad Busby, Florida State (AP-1)
- Brian Kuklick, Wake Forest (AP-2)

=== Running backs ===
- Raymond Priester, Clemson (AP-1)
- Tremayne Stephens, NC State (AP-1)
- Jonathan Linton, North Carolina (AP-2)
- Travis Minor, Florida State (AP-2)

== Defensive selections ==
=== Defensive linemen ===
- Antonio Dingle, Virginia (AP-1)
- Greg Ellis, North Carolina (AP-1)
- Vonnie Holliday, North Carolina (AP-1)
- Andre Wadsworth, Florida State (AP-1)
- Greg Spires, Florida State (AP-2)
- Raymond White, Clemson (AP-2)
- Ralph Hughes, Georgia Tech (AP-2)
- Chris Combs, Duke (AP-2)
- Lorenzo Bromell, Clemson (AP-2)

=== Linebackers ===
- Sam Cowart, Florida State (AP-1)
- Kivuusama Mays, North Carolina (AP-1)
- Anthony Simmons, Clemson (AP-1)
- Brian Simmons, North Carolina (AP-2)
- Keith Brooking, Georgia Tech (AP-2)
- Daryl Bush, Florida State (AP-2)

=== Defensive backs ===
- Dré Bly, North Carolina (AP-1)
- Samari Rolle, Florida State (AP-1)
- Anthony Poindexter, Virginia (AP-1)
- Robert Williams, North Carolina (AP-1)
- Dexter Jackson, Florida State (AP-2)
- Shevin Smith, Florida State (AP-2)
- Omar Brown, North Carolina (AP-2)
- Antuan Edwards, Clemson (AP-2)
- D'Angelo Solomon, Wake Forest (AP-2)

== Special teams ==
=== Placekickers ===
- Sims Lenhardt, Duke (AP-1)
- Sebastian Janikowski, Florida State (AP-2)

=== Punters ===
- Rodney Williams, Georgia Tech (AP-1)
- Tripp Moore, Wake Forest (AP-2)

=== Return specialist ===
- Tony Horne, Clemson (AP-1)
- Scottie Montgomery, Duke (AP-2)

== Key ==
AP = Associated Press

== See also ==
1997 College Football All-America Team
