= Will Brice =

American football player (born 1974)

No. 10
- Position: Punter

Personal information
- Born: October 24, 1974 (age 52); Lancaster, South Carolina, U.S.
- Listed height: 6 ft 4 in (1.93 m)
- Listed weight: 227 lb (103 kg)

Career information
- High school: Lancaster
- College: Virginia (1993–1996)
- NFL draft: 1997: undrafted

Career history
- St. Louis Rams (1997); Amsterdam Admirals (1998); Cincinnati Bengals (1999)

Awards and highlights
- First-team All-American (1995); 2× First-team All-ACC (1995, 1996); 2× Second-team All-ACC (1993, 1994); Virginia Cavaliers Jersey No. 10 retired
- Stats at Pro Football Reference

Will Brice (born October 24, 1974) is an American former professional football player who was a punter in the National Football League (NFL). He played college football for the Virginia Cavaliers. Brice played in the NFL for the St. Louis Rams in 1997 and for the Cincinnati Bengals in 1999.
