= Dwayne Morgan (gridiron football) =

American football player (born 1974)

No. 60, 62, 73
- Position: Tackle

Personal information
- Born: May 3, 1974 (age 52); Griffin, Georgia, U.S.
- Listed height: 6 ft 4 in (1.93 m)
- Listed weight: 300 lb (136 kg)

Career information
- High school: Griffin
- College: Northeastern Oklahoma A&M (1992–1993); Clemson (1994–1995)
- NFL draft: 1996: undrafted

Career history
- Hamilton Tiger-Cats (1996); Toronto Argonauts (1998); Detroit Lions (1999)*; Toronto Argonauts (1999); Montreal Alouettes (2000); Toronto Argonauts (2000–2002); Atlanta Falcons (2003); Washington Redskins (2004)*; Tampa Bay Storm (2007)
- * Offseason or practice squad member only

Awards and highlights
- Second-team All-ACC (1995)

Career NFL statistics
- Games played: 5
- Stats at Pro Football Reference

Career CFL statistics
- Games played: 88
- Stats at CFL.ca
- Stats at ArenaFan.com

Dwayne Morgan (born May 3, 1974) is an American former professional football tackle who played in the Canadian Football League (CFL) for the Hamilton Tiger-Cats, Toronto Argonauts and Montreal Alouettes and in the National Football League (NFL) for the Detroit Lions, Atlanta Falcons and Washington Redskins. He played college football for the Northeastern Oklahoma A&M Golden Norsemen and Clemson Tigers. Morgan also had a stint in the Arena Football League (AFL) with the Tampa Bay Storm.

== Early life ==
Morgan was born on May 3, 1974, in Griffin, Georgia and attended Griffin High School. He committed to play college football at Northeastern Oklahoma A&M College.

== College career ==
Morgan played college football for the Northeastern Oklahoma A&M Golden Norsemen from 1992 to 1993 and Clemson Tigers from 1994 to 1995. After two seasons at Northeastern Oklahoma A&M, he transferred to Clemson University. Morgan became the starter at right tackle and played in all 11 games.

On April 4, 1995, Morgan and teammate Anthony Perez Arnez Davis, were arrested after confessing to robbing another student of $7 on March 11. They were charged with strong-arm robbery and released on $2,500 bond but were both suspended indefinitely from the team. Morgan was reinstated after completing counseling and public service. He played all 11 games at right tackle, earning second-team All-ACC honors.

== Professional career ==
=== Hamilton Tiger-Cats ===
After going unselected in the 1996 NFL draft, Morgan signed with the Hamilton Tiger-Cats of the Canadian Football League (CFL) as an undrafted free agent. He played and started in 14 games in his rookie season. On May 24, 1997, Morgan was released by the team.

=== Toronto Argonauts (first stint) ===
On May 6, 1998, the Toronto Argonauts signed Morgan. He played in 16 games for the team before he was placed on the suspended list on March 4.

=== Detroit Lions ===
On March 3, 1999, Morgan was signed by the Detroit Lions of the National Football League (NFL). On August 31, he was released by the team.

=== Toronto Argonauts (second stint) ===
On September 9, 1999, Morgan was re-signed by the Toronto Argonauts. He dressed in eight games but missed time due to an ankle injury. Morgan became a free agent at the end of the season.

=== Montreal Alouettes ===
On March 13, 2000, Morgan was signed by the Montreal Alouettes. He played in 12 games for the team before he was traded back to the Argonauts for future considerations.

=== Toronto Argonauts (third stint) ===
After Morgan returned for the third-time, he dressed in the final six games of the 2000 season for the team. He then played the next two seasons with the Argonauts, appearing in 32 games at tackle.

=== Atlanta Falcons ===
On February 5, 2003, Morgan signed with the Atlanta Falcons. On September 1, he was released and signed to the practice squad. On November 3, Morgan was elevated to the active roster. On December 9, he was placed on season-ending injured reserve after suffering a torn quadriceps tendon in his right knee. Morgan played in five games on field goal and PAT duties. Morgan became a free agent at the end of the season.

=== Washington Redskins ===
On August 4, 2004, Morgan was signed by the Washington Redskins. On August 31, he was released by the team.

=== Tampa Bay Storm ===
On January 29, 2007, Morgan signed with the Tampa Bay Storm of the Arena Football League (AFL). He played in five games but missed time with a knee injury.

== Personal life ==
After Morgan retired from professional football, he became a youth pastor and trainer for offensive and defensive linemen. His son, Dwayne T. Morgan, played college basketball for UNLV and Southern Utah and overseas in Mexico and China.
