= Kivuusama Mays =

American football player (born 1975)

No. 53, 56, 55
- Position: Linebacker

Personal information
- Born: January 7, 1975 (age 51); Anniston, Alabama, U.S.
- Listed height: 6 ft 3 in (1.91 m)
- Listed weight: 247 lb (112 kg)

Career information
- High school: San Antonio (TX) Cole
- College: North Carolina
- NFL draft: 1998: 4th round, 110th overall pick

Career history
- Minnesota Vikings (1998–1999); Green Bay Packers (1999); Chicago Enforcers (2001)

Awards and highlights
- Third-team All-American (1997); 2× First-team All-ACC (1995, 1997); Second-team All-ACC (1996)

Career NFL statistics
- Tackles: 17
- Fumble recoveries: 1
- Stats at Pro Football Reference

Kivuusama Mays (born January 7, 1975) is an American former professional football player who was a linebacker in the National Football League (NFL). He played college football for the North Carolina Tar Heels.

== Biography ==
Mays was born on January 7, 1975, in Anniston, Alabama.

== Career ==
Kivuusama was selected in the fourth round of the 1998 NFL draft by the Minnesota Vikings and played that season with the team. He split the following season between the Vikings and the Green Bay Packers.

He played at the collegiate level at the University of North Carolina at Chapel Hill.
