= Chris Harrison (American football) =

American football player (born 1972)

No. 74, 67
- Position: Guard

Personal information
- Born: February 25, 1972 (age 54); Washington, D.C., U.S.
- Listed height: 6 ft 3 in (1.91 m)
- Listed weight: 290 lb (132 kg)

Career information
- High school: St. John's College (Washington, D.C.)
- College: Virginia
- NFL draft: 1996: undrafted

Career history
- Detroit Lions (1996–1998); Minnesota Vikings (1998)*; Baltimore Ravens (1999); Denver Broncos (2000)*
- * Offseason or practice squad member only

Awards and highlights
- Second-team All-ACC (1995)
- Stats at Pro Football Reference

Chris Harrison (born February 25, 1972) is an American former professional football player who was a guard for the Detroit Lions of the National Football League (NFL). He played college football for the Virginia Cavaliers.

Harrison is now the proprietor of Plant 64 as well as C. A. Harrison Companies.
