= Rodney Williams (punter) =

American football player (born 1977)

Rodney C. Williams
No. 2, 12
- Position: Punter

Personal information
- Born: April 25, 1977 (age 49); Brooklyn, New York, U.S.
- Listed height: 6 ft 0 in (1.83 m)
- Listed weight: 210 lb (95 kg)

Career information
- High school: Southwest DeKalb (Decatur, Georgia)
- College: Georgia Tech
- NFL draft: 1999: 7th round, 252nd overall pick

Career history
- St. Louis Rams (1999)*; Washington Redskins (2000)*; Rhein Fire (2000-2001); New York Giants (2001); Seattle Seahawks (2003)*; Kansas City Chiefs (2004)*; New Orleans Saints (2005)*; Edmonton Eskimos (2006); Oakland Raiders (2006)*
- * Offseason or practice squad member only

Awards and highlights
- 2× First-team All-ACC (1997, 1998)

Career NFL statistics
- Punts: 91
- Punt yards: 3,905
- Punting average: 42.9
- Stats at Pro Football Reference

Rodney Colin Williams (born April 25, 1977) is an American former professional football player who was a punter in the National Football League (NFL) and Canadian Football League (CFL). He played college football for the Georgia Tech Yellow Jackets.

== College career ==
Williams, who played from 1995 to 1998, left Georgia Tech as the school's career leader in punting average at 41.1 yards a kick. His single-season average of 45.64 yards per punt in 1997 set a school record that stood until Pressley Harvin III broke it in 2020 with an average of 48.0 yards per punt. That same season, he had a school record 553 punting yards against Florida State. In November 2011, Williams was inducted into the Georgia Tech Sports Hall of Fame.

== Professional career ==
Williams was selected out of Georgia Tech by the St. Louis Rams in the seventh round of the 1999 NFL draft. Williams played 2 seasons in NFL Europe where he was a Special Teams Captain for the 2000 World Bowl Champions, Rhine Fire. In 2001 landing a job with the New York Giants. At the time, Williams was the only African-American punter in the NFL, and was just the fourth in the league's history. Williams set a team record with a 90-yard punt on Monday Night Football on September 10, 2001, in Denver against the Broncos, a record that stands to date. Williams officially retired from the NFL in 2007.
