= Tom Feamster =

American football player (1930–2020)

No. 79
- Positions: Defensive end, offensive tackle

Personal information
- Born: October 23, 1930; Warwick, Virginia, U.S.
- Died: June 9, 2020 (aged 89); Hazard, Kentucky, U.S.
- Listed height: 6 ft 7 in (2.01 m)
- Listed weight: 260 lb (118 kg)

Career information
- High school: Warwick (Newport News, Virginia)
- College: William & Mary; Florida State
- NFL draft: 1955: 4th round, 40th overall pick

Career history
- Los Angeles Rams (1956)*; Baltimore Colts (1956)
- * Offseason or practice squad member only

Career NFL statistics
- Games played: 12
- Games started: 3
- Stats at Pro Football Reference

Thomas Otey Feamster (October 23, 1930 – June 9, 2020) was an American professional football player for the National Football League (NFL)'s Baltimore Colts. He played in twelve games in the 1956 season after his collegiate career at William & Mary and then Florida State.

In 1969, Feamster entered a seminary and was later ordained an Episcopal priest. In 1979, he served as a minister to John Spenkelink prior to Spenkelink's execution.
