= James Farrior =

American football player (born 1975)

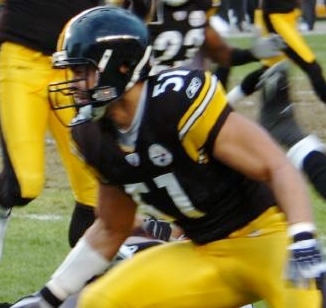
- Farrior with the Pittsburgh Steelers in 2006

No. 58, 51
- Position: Linebacker

Personal information
- Born: January 6, 1975 (age 51); Petersburg, Virginia, U.S.
- Listed height: 6 ft 2 in (1.88 m)
- Listed weight: 243 lb (110 kg)

Career information
- High school: Matoaca (Matoaca, Virginia)
- College: Virginia (1993–1996)
- NFL draft: 1997: 1st round, 8th overall pick

Career history
- New York Jets (1997–2001); Pittsburgh Steelers (2002–2011)

Awards and highlights
- 2× Super Bowl champion (XL, XLIII); First-team All-Pro (2004); Second-team All-Pro (2008); 2× Pro Bowl (2004, 2008); Pittsburgh Steelers Hall of Honor (2020); 2× Second-team All-ACC (1995, 1996); Virginia Sports Hall of Fame (2016)

Career NFL statistics
- Tackles: 1,440
- Sacks: 35.5
- Forced fumbles: 18
- Fumble recoveries: 12
- Interceptions: 11
- Defensive touchdowns: 1
- Stats at Pro Football Reference

James Alfred Farrior (born January 6, 1975) is an American former professional football player who was a linebacker for 15 seasons in the National Football League (NFL). He played college football for the Virginia Cavaliers. He played with the New York Jets and the Pittsburgh Steelers, and earned two Super Bowl rings with the Steelers (XL and XLIII).

== Early life ==
Farrior was born in Ettrick, Virginia. He was a Parade High School All-America selection and named Virginia's Group AA Co-Offensive Player of the Year as a senior at Matoaca High School in his hometown and birthplace of Ettrick, Virginia. He was also selected first-team All-Conference at both fullback and linebacker, also earned All-Metro and All-State honors, he was The Richmond Times-Dispatch co-Player of the Year after posting 78 tackles, 11 sacks, five blocked kicks, four forced fumbles and two interceptions, he rushed the ball 105 times for 1,006 (9.6 avg.) and 22 touchdown and had 19 receptions for 340 yards (17.9 avg.) and 4 touchdowns receiving as a senior fullback. He earned All-Metro, district and region honors as a junior, and was a three sport letter winner in football, track, and wrestling.

== College career ==
Farrior played for coach George Welsh's Virginia Cavaliers football team while attending the University of Virginia. During his career there, he racked up 381 tackles, ranking him third on the school's all-time list. In 1996 season, Farrior earned All-Atlantic Coast Conference first-team honors as a senior while registering 107 tackles, 13 tackles for a loss, 7 passes defensed, and 6.5 sacks. He even played against his future head coach, Mike Tomlin, while Tomlin was a wide receiver at William & Mary.

In 1995 season as a junior he earned All-ACC second-team honors after he started every game at LOLB and led the team in tackles (122 stops) and also had half sack, nine passes defensed and an interception. In 1994, he earned all-ACC honorable mention as a sophomore when he started every game at LOLB and finished second on the team in tackles with 100, 1 sack, a blocked punt, 4 interceptions and 6 passes defensed. During 1993, as a freshman he appeared in 10 games and had 52 tackles, placing him seventh on the team, despite not starting any games, he earned ACC Newcomer of the Week honors when he came off the bench to register 18 tackles vs. Ohio. He had seven tackles and a fumble recovery vs. Boston College in the Carquest Bowl.

He graduated in four years with a bachelor's degree in psychology.

== Professional career ==
Pre-draft measurables
Height	Weight	Arm length	Hand span	20-yard shuttle	Three-cone drill	Vertical jump	Broad jump	Bench press
6 ft 1 3/4 in (1.87 m)	234 lb (106 kg)	32 5/8 in (0.83 m)	9 1/4 in (0.23 m)	4.40 s	7.62 s	35.5 in (0.90 m)	10 ft 0 in (3.05 m)	22 reps
All values from NFL Combine

=== New York Jets ===
Farrior began his professional career in 1997 as the eighth overall pick in the first round for the New York Jets. Until 2001, Farrior played sparingly as a reserve outside linebacker, playing in only 27 games from 1997 through 2000. In 2001, Farrior broke out and recorded 142 tackles, 106 of which were solo, one sack and two interceptions. After the 2001 season, the Jets allowed Farrior to leave via free agency, but his career exploded once he got to the Pittsburgh Steelers and was put back in his college position, inside linebacker.

=== Pittsburgh Steelers ===
In his first year with the Pittsburgh Steelers, Farrior recorded 82 tackles throughout 14 games. In 2003, he recorded 141 tackles and one interception. During the 2004 season, his third with the franchise, Farrior made 94 tackles, three sacks, and a career-high four interceptions. He also finished second behind Ed Reed for NFL Defensive Player of the Year honors. During the Pittsburgh Steelers 2005 campaign Farrior missed 2 games due to injury, but performed well in the 14 regular season games and 4 post-season games in which he appeared. His best regular season performance came in a week 3 loss to the New England Patriots, in which he recorded 9 tackles and 1 sack. Farrior's best performance in the post-season came in the AFC Divisional playoffs against the Indianapolis Colts, where Farrior recorded 10 tackles and 2.5 sacks. He finished the season with 119 tackles and a Super Bowl ring. In 2006, he played in all 16 games and recorded 126 tackles, four sacks and one interception. Farrior finished the 2007 season with 94 tackles and 6.5 sacks, a career-high, along with one interception. Entering the 2008 season, Farrior stated that he wished to remain a Steeler for the remainder of his career. In August 2008, Farrior signed a five-year, US$18.25 million contract with the Steelers. The deal included a $5 million signing bonus. At the end of the 2010 season, Farrior and the Steelers appeared in Super Bowl XLV against the Green Bay Packers. He was a starter in the game and recorded two total tackles in the 31–25 loss. He was released on March 2, 2012. On September 25, 2020, it was announced that James is a member of the Pittsburgh Steelers Class of 2020 Hall of Honor (aka Ring of Honor).

=== NFL statistics ===
Legend
	Won the Super Bowl
**Bold**	Career high

Year	Team	GP	COMB	TOTAL	AST	SACK	FF	FR	FR YDS	INT	IR YDS	AVG IR	LNG	TD	PD
1997	NYJ	16	71	53	18	1.5	1	0	0	0	0	0	0	0	0
1998	NYJ	12	27	17	10	0.0	0	1	0	0	0	0	0	0	0
1999	NYJ	16	51	42	9	2.0	1	0	0	0	0	0	0	0	2
2000	NYJ	16	61	51	10	1.0	1	1	0	1	0	0	0	0	5
2001	NYJ	16	**145**	**109**	36	1.0	**3**	0	0	2	84	**42**	**47**	0	9
2002	PIT	14	82	60	22	0.0	0	1	4	0	0	0	0	0	1
2003	PIT	16	141	96	**45**	0.0	0	1	0	1	9	9	9	0	4
2004	PIT	16	95	67	28	3.0	**3**	**3**	0	**4**	**113**	28	41	**1**	**12**
2005	PIT	14	121	76	**45**	2.0	2	1	0	0	0	0	0	0	4
2006	PIT	16	128	85	43	4.0	2	1	0	1	1	1	1	0	6
2007	PIT	16	96	65	31	**6.5**	2	0	0	1	0	0	0	0	8
2008	PIT	16	133	89	44	3.5	1	1	0	0	0	0	0	0	5
2009	PIT	16	102	68	34	3.0	1	1	1	1	18	18	18	0	5
2010	PIT	16	109	80	29	6.0	1	1	**8**	0	0	0	0	0	5
2011	PIT	14	78	54	24	2.0	0	0	0	0	0	0	0	0	3
Career		230	1,440	1012	428	35.5	18	12	13	11	225	20	47	1	69

=== VA Hall of Fame Induction ===
In 2016, Farrior was inducted into the Virginia Sports Hall of Fame in Portsmouth, Virginia. He was also a nominee for the 2020 Pro Football Hall of Fame. Farrior is a member of the Class of 2020 Pittsburgh Steelers Hall of Honor.

== Personal life ==
He is nicknamed "Potsie" by his parents, Rebecca and James Farrior, because he had a pot-belly as a child and because of the popularity of the sit-com Happy Days. Farrior has garnered several nicknames among fans, too; one being "The Ultimate Farrior", a play on words in reference to explosive WWF wrestler The Ultimate Warrior. He is the older brother of former NFL linebacker, Matt Farrior. In July 2012, Farrior wed. He and his wife, Iman, reside in Los Angeles, California.

James and his brother Matt Farrior have been recognized for their charitable contributions and actions and have created their own foundation, The James Farrior Foundation. The foundation runs a variety of programs to assist those in need through all stages of life. The Impact 51 program provides guidance and mentoring for students, the Farrior Scholarship Fund provides college financial assistance to eligible students and the Families in Crisis program provides assistance in many forms to families in need. In addition to their own organization, James and Matt work with the National Bone Marrow Registry. For these and other contributions to those less fortunate, the Farrior Foundation was given the key to the city of Richmond, Virginia, by Richmond's Mayor Dwight C. Jones in June 2009. James Farrior is also a recipient of the Bravo award given by the Chesterfield Public Education Foundation which recognizes Extraordinary Alumni of the Chesterfield County Public Schools.
