= Byron Capers =

American football player (born 1974)

No. 28
- Position: Defensive back

Personal information
- Born: March 21, 1974 (age 52); Washington, D.C., U.S.
- Listed height: 6 ft 1 in (1.85 m)
- Listed weight: 194 lb (88 kg)

Career information
- High school: Joseph Wheeler (Marietta, Georgia)
- College: Florida State
- NFL draft: 1997: 7th round, 225th overall pick

Career history
- 1997*: Philadelphia Eagles
- 1997*: Kansas City Chiefs
- 1998–2001: Toronto Argonauts
- 2001: BC Lions
- 2001–2002: Winnipeg Blue Bombers
- 2002–2003: Ottawa Renegades
- 2003: Edmonton Eskimos
- 2004: Ottawa Renegades

Awards and highlights
- Grey Cup champion (2003); Bowl Coalition national champion (1993); First-team All-ACC (1996); Second-team All-ACC (1995)

Career CFL statistics
- Total tackles: 193
- Forced fumbles: 6
- Fumble recoveries: 5
- Pass deflections: 37
- Interceptions: 7

Byron Capers (born March 21, 1974) is an American former professional football player who was a defensive back in the Canadian Football League (CFL). He played college football for the Florida State Seminoles.

== Early life ==
Capers was born in Washington, D.C., and grew up primarily in Marietta, Georgia, where he attended Wheeler High School. As a senior, he was named first-team All-State and a second-team All-American by USA Today after making 117 tackles on defense and rushing for 1,305 yards on offense, as well as an All-American in track. Capers committed to play college football at Florida State University.

== College career ==
Capers played four seasons for the Florida State Seminoles. As a freshman, he appeared mostly as a reserve safety and on special teams in the Seminoles 1993 national championship team. As a junior, he was named as the second-team All-Atlantic Coast Conference. He was named as the first-team All-ACC in his senior season.

Capers also competed in Florida State's track team and earned All-America status as a junior in the 4x100 relay.

== Professional career ==
Capers was selected in the seventh round of the 1997 NFL draft by the Philadelphia Eagles but was cut at the end training camp. He was signed by the Kansas City Chiefs into their practice squad on November 13, 1997.

In 1998, Capers was signed by the Toronto Argonauts of the Canadian Football League (CFL). Capers played three and a half seasons in Toronto before being traded to the BC Lions in 2001. Capers was released by the Lions after three games and was signed by the Winnipeg Blue Bombers where he finished the season, recording four interceptions in seven games played. He was released by the Blue Bombers in August of the following season and was picked up by the Ottawa Renegades for the final three games of the season. Capers started the 2003 season with the Renegades before being released and was signed later in the season by the Edmonton Eskimos, where he was a member of the Grey Cup championship team but did not play in any games. He was re-signed by the Renegades in 2004.
