= Andre Wadsworth =

American football player (born 1974)

No. 90, 57
- Position: Defensive end

Personal information
- Born: October 19, 1974 (age 52); St. Croix, U.S. Virgin Islands
- Listed height: 6 ft 4 in (1.93 m)
- Listed weight: 272 lb (123 kg)

Career information
- High school: Florida Christian School (Olympia Heights, Florida)
- College: Florida State
- NFL draft: 1998: 1st round, 3rd overall pick

Career history
- Arizona Cardinals (1998–2000); New York Jets (2007)*
- * Offseason or practice squad member only

Awards and highlights
- PFWA All-Rookie Team (1998); Bill Willis Trophy (1997); Consensus All-American (1997); ACC Player of the Year (1997); ACC Defensive Player of the Year (1997); First-team All-ACC (1997); 2× Second-team All-ACC (1995, 1996)

Career NFL statistics
- Games played: 36
- Games started: 30
- Tackles: 96
- Sacks: 8.0
- Interceptions: 1
- Stats at Pro Football Reference

Andre Wadsworth (born October 19, 1974) is an American former professional football defensive end. He played College football for Florida State University, and earned All-American honors. He was selected in the first round of the 1998 NFL draft by the Arizona Cardinals.

== Early life ==
Wadsworth was born in St. Croix, U.S. Virgin Islands. He attended Class A Florida Christian School in Miami-Dade County, Florida, where he starred at tight end for the Florida Christian Patriots high school football team. Wadsworth was named first-team All-Dade County and voted all-conference and second-team all-state as a defensive lineman. He also returned a kickoff 98 yards for a touchdown.

== College career ==
Wadsworth was recruited by only one small college, Stony Brook in New York. Wadsworth decided to attend Florida State University, and played for the Florida State Seminoles football team as a walk-on and eventually earned an athletic scholarship. He received second-team All-Atlantic Coast Conference (ACC) honors his freshman, sophomore and junior seasons (1994–1996) as a defensive tackle. Despite being a potential top-10 NFL Draft pick after his junior season, he stayed for his senior year, citing a pinched nerve in his neck that forced him out of four games in 1996 as a concern regarding his physical capabilities to perform for scouts at full capacity.

He switched from defensive tackle to left defensive end for his senior season, registering 59 tackles, 19 tackles for a loss and 16 quarterback sacks, placing him second in both categories in the school's all-time records. One of four finalists for the Lombardi Award, he was named first-team All-ACC and a consensus first-team All-American. He was also selected ACC Player of the Year, and ACC Defensive Player of the year in 1997.

== Professional career ==
=== 1998 NFL draft ===
Wadsworth bench pressed 500 pounds and had a personal best in the squat of 690. The Steelers' college personnel director, Tom Modrak, said: "He's like a missile when he comes off the ball. He can keep his pads low and still run full speed. He's flexible, and he's around 280 pounds."

Wadsworth was regarded as the No. 1 defensive prospect in the 1998 NFL draft. He was selected in the first round with the third overall pick by the Arizona Cardinals, after Peyton Manning and Ryan Leaf.

Pre-draft measurables
Height	Weight	Arm length	Hand span	40-yard dash	20-yard shuttle	Three-cone drill	Vertical jump	Broad jump
6 ft 3 5/8 in (1.92 m)	278 lb (126 kg)	34 1/4 in (0.87 m)	10 1/4 in (0.26 m)	4.65 s	4.38 s	7.42 s	35.5 in (0.90 m)	9 ft 11 in (3.02 m)
All values from NFL Combine

=== Arizona Cardinals ===
A lengthy holdout ensued, centered almost directly on both his demand to be paid closer to the contracts signed by the two previous picks, Indianapolis Colts' Peyton Manning out of University of Tennessee at No. 1 and the San Diego Chargers' Ryan Leaf from Washington State University at No. 2 rather than one closer to Heisman Trophy winner Charles Woodson selected by the Oakland Raiders at No. 4, and a provision allowing him to void the contract before expiration if he chose to do so. The holdout lasted until the night before the season-opener (44 days) with a six-year, $42 million contract including a $10.49 million signing bonus (Manning received $11.6 million on a $48 million contract, Leaf got $11.2 million on a five-year contract totaling $31.2 million), though the player-triggered option out was never consummated.

He played in all 16 games his rookie season, finishing with 5.0 sacks and 57 tackles, including 42 solo. Bothered by a knee injury in 1999, he still managed to play in 11 games, tallying 2.0 sacks, 26 tackles, and his only career interception. Off-season knee surgery, the second of his career, held him out from most of the off-season activities, but still managed 13 tackles and one sack in nine games. At the conclusion of the 2000 season, Wadsworth underwent microfracture surgery on his right knee, the third surgery on that knee in his career, and arthroscopic surgery on the left on January 3 with non-team physician Richard Steadman. Possibly due to concerns after teammate Eric Swann's semi-recovery from nine knee surgeries, the Arizona Cardinals released Wadsworth before offering a one-year, $512,000 tender that was eventually pulled off the table within days after it went unsigned.

On January 28, 2007, the St. Petersburg Times reported that the Tampa Bay Buccaneers were planning to give Wadsworth, now 32, a workout. The New York Jets gave Wadsworth a workout later in the offseason. On March 26, 2007, the New York Jets signed Wadsworth to a minimum-based salary contract. Wadsworth was also said to be healthy enough to compete for an outside linebacker position. On September 1, 2007, the Jets released him.

=== NFL statistics ===
Year	Team	GP	COMB	TOTAL	AST	SACK	FF	FR	FR YDS	INT	IR YDS	AVG IR	LNG	TD	PD
1998	ARI	16	56	42	14	5.0	1	3	0	0	0	0	0	0	3
1999	ARI	11	25	19	6	2.0	1	0	0	1	23	23	23	0	3
2000	ARI	9	13	10	3	1.0	1	0	0	0	0	0	0	0	0
Career		36	94	71	23	8.0	3	3	0	1	23	23	23	0	6
