= Ronde Barber =

American football player (born 1975)

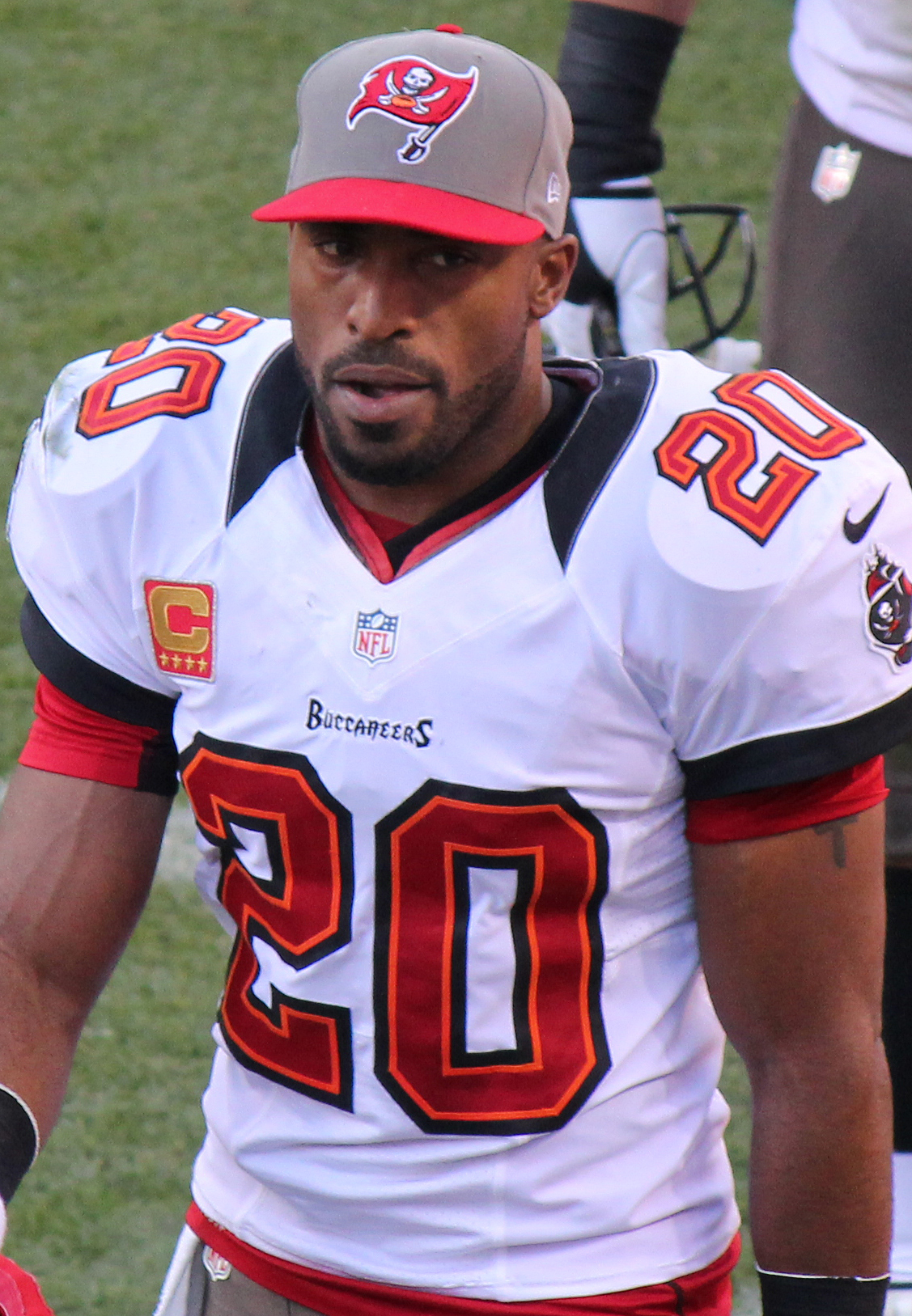
- Barber with the Tampa Bay Buccaneers in 2012

No. 20
- Positions: Cornerback, safety

Personal information
- Born: April 7, 1975 (age 51); Roanoke, Virginia, U.S.
- Listed height: 5 ft 10 in (1.78 m)
- Listed weight: 184 lb (83 kg)

Career information
- High school: Cave Spring (Roanoke)
- College: Virginia (1993–1996)
- NFL draft: 1997: 3rd round, 66th overall pick

Career history
- Tampa Bay Buccaneers (1997–2012)

Awards and highlights
- Super Bowl champion (XXXVII); 3× First-team All-Pro (2001, 2004, 2005); 2× Second-team All-Pro (2002, 2006); 5× Pro Bowl (2001, 2004–2006, 2008); NFL interceptions co-leader (2001); NFL 2000s All-Decade Team; Tampa Bay Buccaneers Ring of Honor; 2× Third-team All-American (1994, 1996); ACC Rookie of the Year (1994); 3× First-team All-ACC (1994–1996); Virginia Cavaliers Jersey No. 19 retired; NFL record: Most consecutive starts by a cornerback: 215 (Note: 224 including playoffs); Most career sacks by a cornerback: 28

Career NFL statistics
- Total tackles: 1,251
- Sacks: 28.0
- Forced fumbles: 15
- Fumble recoveries: 12
- Passes defended: 197
- Interceptions: 47
- Total touchdowns: 14
- Stats at Pro Football Reference
- Pro Football Hall of Fame

Jamael Orondé Barber (born April 7, 1975) is an American former professional football player who played 16 seasons in the National Football League (NFL) with the Tampa Bay Buccaneers. He played college football for the Virginia Cavaliers, earning third-team All-American honors twice. Barber played the cornerback position for the majority of his career and transitioned to safety for his final season.

In the 1997 NFL draft, the Buccaneers selected Barber in the third round with the 66th overall pick. Over the course of his career, Barber was selected to five Pro Bowls, accumulated three first-team All-Pro and two second-team selections. He was selected to the NFL 2000s All-Decade Team. Additionally, he led the NFL in interceptions in 2001, and he is the Buccaneers all-time interceptions leader. Barber is one of three members of the 40/20 club (40+ interceptions, 20+ quarterback sacks; alongside Charles Woodson and Harrison Smith) and the only member of the 45/25 club (45+ interceptions, 25+ quarterback sacks). He also holds the record for most consecutive starts by a cornerback. Barber was inducted into the Virginia Sports Hall of Fame in 2014, and was inducted into the Pro Football Hall of Fame in 2023.

== Early life ==
Barber is the son of Geraldine Barber and James Barber. The Barber twin boys were born five weeks premature. Barber was born seven minutes before his identical twin brother Tiki Barber. He was named Jamael Oronde which means "first born son". Tiki played running back for the New York Giants.

James Barber was a star cornerback at Virginia Tech and later played in the World Football League. His roommate in college was Bruce Arians. Ronde's parents separated when Barber was very young. James Barber rarely saw his sons when they were growing up, and failed to provide suitable financial support to them. His mother Geraldine worked two, sometimes three jobs to support her three sons. He and Tiki have an older brother, Tarik Barber.

Barber graduated from Cave Spring High School of Roanoke, Virginia in 1993, and was a standout in football, wrestling, and track. In football, Barber was a three-time All-District selection. In track, Barber won the national title in the 55-meter hurdles as a senior in 1993, with a career-best time of 7.18 seconds. He was timed at 14.05 seconds in the 110-meter hurdles. He also won four Group AAA hurdles titles in indoor and outdoor track.

== College career ==
Barber received an athletic scholarship to attend the University of Virginia, where he played for the Virginia Cavaliers football team. He redshirted the 1993 season and played for the Cavaliers from the 1994 to 1996 seasons as a cornerback. He was also a kick returner in 1994 and 1996; in 1994, Barber returned 10 kickoffs for 171 yards, and in 1996, he returned 3 for 36 yards. As a defensive back, Barber made 15 interceptions returned for 112 yards in his career with Virginia: 8 for 56 yards in 1994, 4 for 18 yards in 1995, and 3 for 38 yards in 1996. The Atlantic Coast Conference (ACC) recognized Barber as Freshman of the Year after the 1994 season, and Barber earned first-team All-ACC honors in all his three seasons with Virginia. Barber was part of the Virginia teams that won the 1994 Independence Bowl and December 1995 Peach Bowl. After his junior season in 1996, Barber declared for the 1997 NFL draft. Barber graduated from Virginia in 1997 with a bachelor's degree in commerce with an emphasis in marketing. During Barber's time at UVa, he was a member of the IMP Society, one of the university's secret societies.

== Professional career ==
=== Pre-draft ===
On January 3, 1997, Barber announced his decision to forgo his final season of eligibility and enter the 1997 NFL draft. He became only the third player from the University of Virginia to enter the NFL draft with eligibility remaining.

Pre-draft measurables
Height	Weight	Arm length	Hand span	40-yard dash	10-yard split	20-yard split	20-yard shuttle	Three-cone drill	Vertical jump	Broad jump	Bench press
5 ft 9 3/8 in (1.76 m)	185 lb (84 kg)	31 5/8 in (0.80 m)	9 1/2 in (0.24 m)	4.66 s	1.67 s	2.77 s	4.46 s	7.22 s	34.5 in (0.88 m)	9 ft 10 in (3.00 m)	14 reps
All values from NFL Combine

=== 1997 ===
The Tampa Bay Buccaneers drafted Barber in the third round (66th overall) of the 1997 NFL draft. He was the first of two cornerbacks drafted by the Buccaneers in 1997, alongside sixth round pick (169th overall) Al Harris. He was the tenth cornerback, the third underclassmen, and the fifth of sixth players from Virginia to be selected in 1997. His identical twin brother and college teammate, Tiki Barber, was selected in the second-round (36th overall) by the New York Giants. They became the fourth set of twins in NFL history to both be selected in one draft, following Rich and Ron Saul (1970), Reggie and Raleigh McKenzie (1985), and Keith and Kerry Cash (1991).

On July 18, 1997, the Tampa Bay Buccaneers signed Barber to a three—year, $939,250 rookie contract that included a signing bonus of $405,000.

As a rookie, Barber played only one game, in week 5 (September 28) against the Arizona Cardinals. Barber had three tackles. Tampa advanced to the divisional round of the playoffs but lost to the Green Bay Packers.

=== 1998 ===
In his second season, Barber started nine games (three as left cornerback and six as right cornerback) and played in all 16 games, recording 68 tackles, 17 passes deflected, 3 sacks, 2 interceptions (returned for 67 yards), 2 forced fumbles, and 12 special teams tackles.

=== 1999 ===
In the 1999 season, Barber again played in all 16 games and started 15 as right cornerback. Improving from his previous seasons, Barber posted 74 tackles, two interceptions (60 yards), one sack, and 16 passes deflected. Making his postseason debut this season, Barber also started both playoff games; the Buccaneers lost the NFC Championship game to eventual Super Bowl XXXIV champion St. Louis Rams.

=== 2000 ===
On February 10, 2000, the Tampa Bay Buccaneers re–signed Barber to a one—year, $552,000 contract.

For the first time in his career, Barber started all 16 games in a season in 2000. Barber reached new career bests with 97 tackles, 20 passes deflected, and 5.5 sacks. With his 5.5 sacks, Barber led all NFC defensive backs in sacks. He had two interceptions (46 yards), one forced fumble, one fumble recovery, and six special teams tackles. For the week 2 (September 10) game, Barber was NFC Defensive Player of the Week for 3 tackles, 2.5 sacks, a forced fumble, and a 24-yard fumble recovery for a touchdown against the Chicago Bears. Picking and returning for 37 yards a pass from former Tampa quarterback Vinny Testaverde, Barber scored his first career touchdown from an interception return in the week 4 (September 24) 21–17 loss to the New York Jets. In the Wild Card game on December 31, a 21–3 loss to the Philadelphia Eagles, Barber made 5 tackles.

=== 2001 ===
On April 9, 2001, the Tampa Bay Buccaneers signed Barber to a six—year, $20.25 million contract extension that included a signing bonus of $2.55 million.

In 2001, Barber started 16 of 16 regular season games and made 71 tackles, 1 sack, 14 passes deflected, and 10 interceptions (86 yards). Barber returned an intercepted pass from Aaron Brooks 36 yards for a touchdown in the week 15 (December 23) win over the New Orleans Saints. Barber made his first Pro Bowl and All-Pro teams this season.

=== 2002 ===
Starting all 16 games again this season, Barber made 79 tackles, 3 sacks, 17 passes deflected, and returned 2 interceptions for 9 yards. Barber was part of a Tampa secondary that ranked first in total defense and passes defended. Barber also started all three playoff games, including Tampa's Super Bowl XXXVII victory.

In the NFC Championship game on January 19, 2003, Barber picked off a pass from Philadelphia Eagles quarterback Donovan McNabb and returned the interception 92 yards for a touchdown late in the fourth quarter to seal Tampa's 27–10 road victory and brought Veterans Stadium to near-silence. Bob Ford of The Philadelphia Inquirer labeled this game as "the most ignominious defeat of Andy Reid's head coaching career" because of Barber's interception return. In 2011, Tampa Bay Times sportswriter Rick Stroud ranked Barber's interception return for touchdown in the NFC Championship game as the greatest scoring play in team history. Barber also deflected 4 passes in that game. In Tampa's 48–21 victory over the Oakland Raiders in Super Bowl XXXVII on January 26, 2003, Barber made five tackles.

=== 2003 ===
For the fourth consecutive season, Barber started all 16 regular season games. Barber again continued to make more tackles annually with 97 this season. Additionally, Barber deflected 3 passes, returned 2 interceptions for 53 yards, and forced 3 fumbles. In week 5 (October 6), a 38–35 overtime loss to the Indianapolis Colts, Barber returned an intercepted pass from Peyton Manning 29 yards for a touchdown.

=== 2004 ===
Starting all 16 regular-season games, Barber made 98 tackles, 3 sacks, 10 passes defended, 3 interceptions returned for 23 yards, and 2 forced fumbles. He also returned 2 fumbles for touchdowns. Chosen as a starter for the 2005 Pro Bowl, Barber made his second career Pro Bowl appearance. This season, Barber also earned first-team All-Pro honors from the Associated Press. For the second time since the 2002 Super Bowl championship season, Tampa's pass defense was number one in the league, and Tampa's total defense was in the top ten for the eighth straight season.

=== 2005 ===
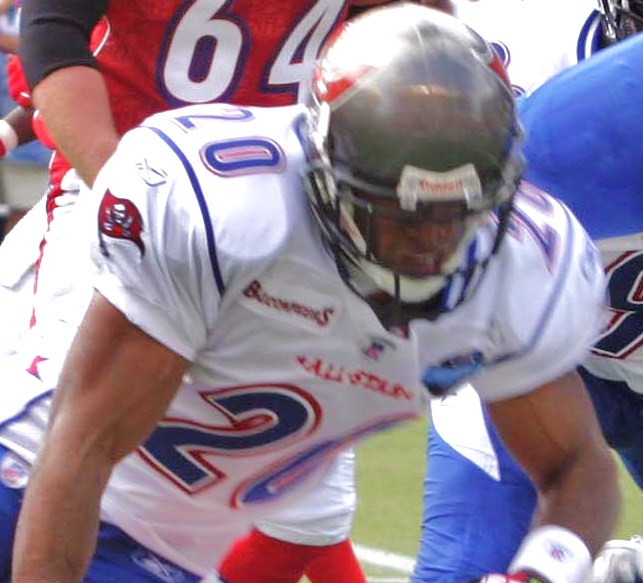
Barber (shown here in the 2006 Pro Bowl) is a five-time Pro Bowl pick.

Barber had 99 tackles, 2 sacks, 15 passes defended, and 5 interceptions returned for 105 yards in 16 games (all starts) in 2005. Barber intercepted three passes (returned for 70 yards) from Saints quarterback Aaron Brooks on December 4 (week 13) in Tampa's 10–3 win over New Orleans, including one in the end zone in the Saints' final drive. On December 11, in the week 14 game against the Carolina Panthers, he became the first cornerback in the history of the NFL to record at least 20 interceptions and 20 sacks in his career. Tampa lost the Wild Card game 17–10 to the Washington Redskins, and Barber made 8 tackles that game. Barber made his third career Pro Bowl appearance in the 2006 Pro Bowl.

=== 2006 ===
On August 2, 2006, the Tampa Bay Buccaneers signed Barber to a five—year, $24 million contract extension that included an initial signing bonus of $6 million.

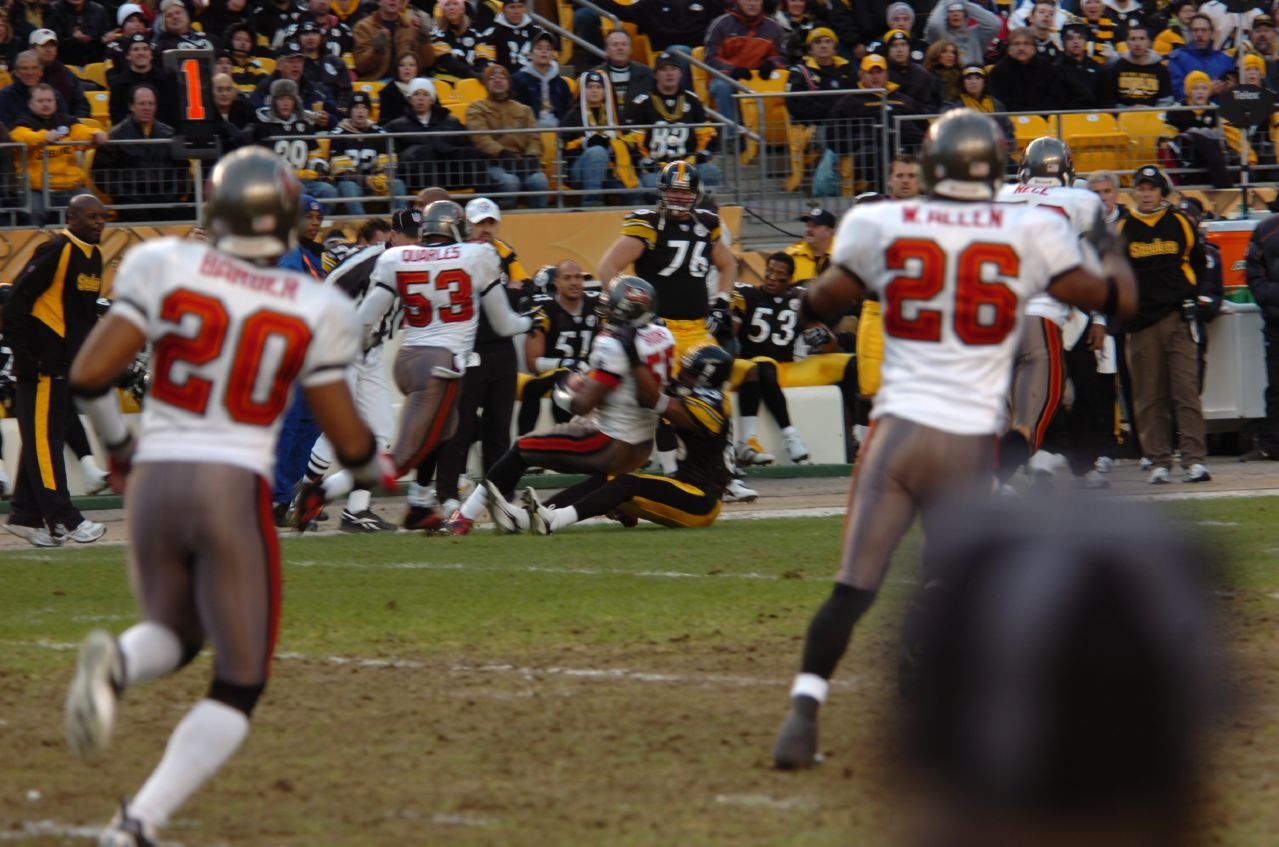
Barber (20) in a 2006 game against the Pittsburgh Steelers.

In 2006, starting 16 of 16 regular-season games, Barber had 98 tackles and 13 passes deflected. He also returned 3 interceptions for 103 yards; two of those interceptions Barber returned for touchdowns. On October 22 (week 7) against Philadelphia, Barber became the first player in Buccaneers history to return two interceptions for touchdowns in one regular season game. After Barber scored in the second quarter on a 37-yard return of an interception from Donovan McNabb, Tampa took a 17–0 lead late in the third quarter with Barber's 66-yard interception return of a McNabb pass. Despite a late comeback by the Eagles, Tampa won 23–21 on a last-second 62 yard field goal by Matt Bryant. Barber made his fourth career and third consecutive Pro Bowl in the 2007 Pro Bowl.

=== 2007 ===
Prior to the season, the team voted Barber as defensive captain. In 16 games, Barber made 58 tackles, one sack, 14 passes deflected, 2 interceptions returned for 32 yards (including a 29-yard touchdown run), and one forced fumble. On November 25, 2007, he took the record from Donnie Abraham for the most interceptions in Buccaneers team history by catching his 32nd against the Washington Redskins. In a 37–3 victory over the Atlanta Falcons on week 15 (December 16), Barber returned an interception of Chris Redman 29 yards for a touchdown.

=== 2008 ===
In 2008, starting 16 of 16 regular season games for the ninth straight season, Barber made 75 tackles, 2 sacks, 12 passes defended, and 4 interceptions returned for 69 yards (including a 65-yard return for touchdown). Again a team defensive captain, Barber made his fifth career and most recent Pro Bowl appearance in the 2009 Pro Bowl. In the week 12 (November 23), a 38–20 win over the hosting Detroit Lions, Barber intercepted Lions quarterback Daunte Culpepper twice and returned one interception 65 yards for a touchdown.

=== 2009 ===
In the 2009 regular season, Barber made 77 tackles, 2 sacks, 6 passes defended, and 2 forced fumbles in 16 games (all starts). However, for the first time since his 1997 rookie season, Barber did not intercept a pass the entire season. Barber had some crucial plays on special teams: in week 4 (October 4) against the Washington Redskins, Barber blocked an extra point kick by Shaun Suisham. In the week 9 win over the Green Bay Packers, Barber returned a punt blocked by Geno Hayes 31 yards for a tying touchdown. Along with Tony Dungy, Derrick Brooks, and Warren Sapp, Barber was voted to the NFL 2000s All-Decade Team prior to the 2010 Pro Bowl.

=== 2010 ===
Barber made 82 tackles, defended 13 passes, and returned 3 interceptions for 98 yards in 16 games. With his 172nd consecutive start in week 6 (October 17), Barber surpassed Dick LeBeau for most consecutive starts by an NFL cornerback and played in his 200th career game two weeks later. On November 21, 2010, Barber became the only player in NFL history with at least 25 sacks (26 total) and 40 interceptions with a 21–0 win over the San Francisco 49ers.

=== 2011 ===
On February 22, 2011, the Tampa Bay Buccaneers re-signed Barber to a one-year, $4 million contract.

Starting all 16 games as a right cornerback, Barber had 79 tackles, 9 passes defended, 1 safety, and 3 interceptions returned for 12 yards. On October 23 (week 7), in an NFL International Series game against the Chicago Bears held in London, England, Barber recorded his first career safety when he tackled Matt Forte in the end zone.

=== 2012 ===
On March 21, 2012, the Tampa Bay Buccaneers signed Barber to a one-year, $3 million contract.

On May 15, 2012, Barber officially switched positions to become a free safety. Barber started all 16 games for the 13th straight season and had 91 tackles, 13 passes defended, 4 interceptions returned for 160 yards, and a forced fumble. In Week 6 against the Kansas City Chiefs, Barber intercepted a pass from Brady Quinn and returned the interception 78 yards for a touchdown during the third quarter and also blocked a punt that culminated in the 38–10 win.

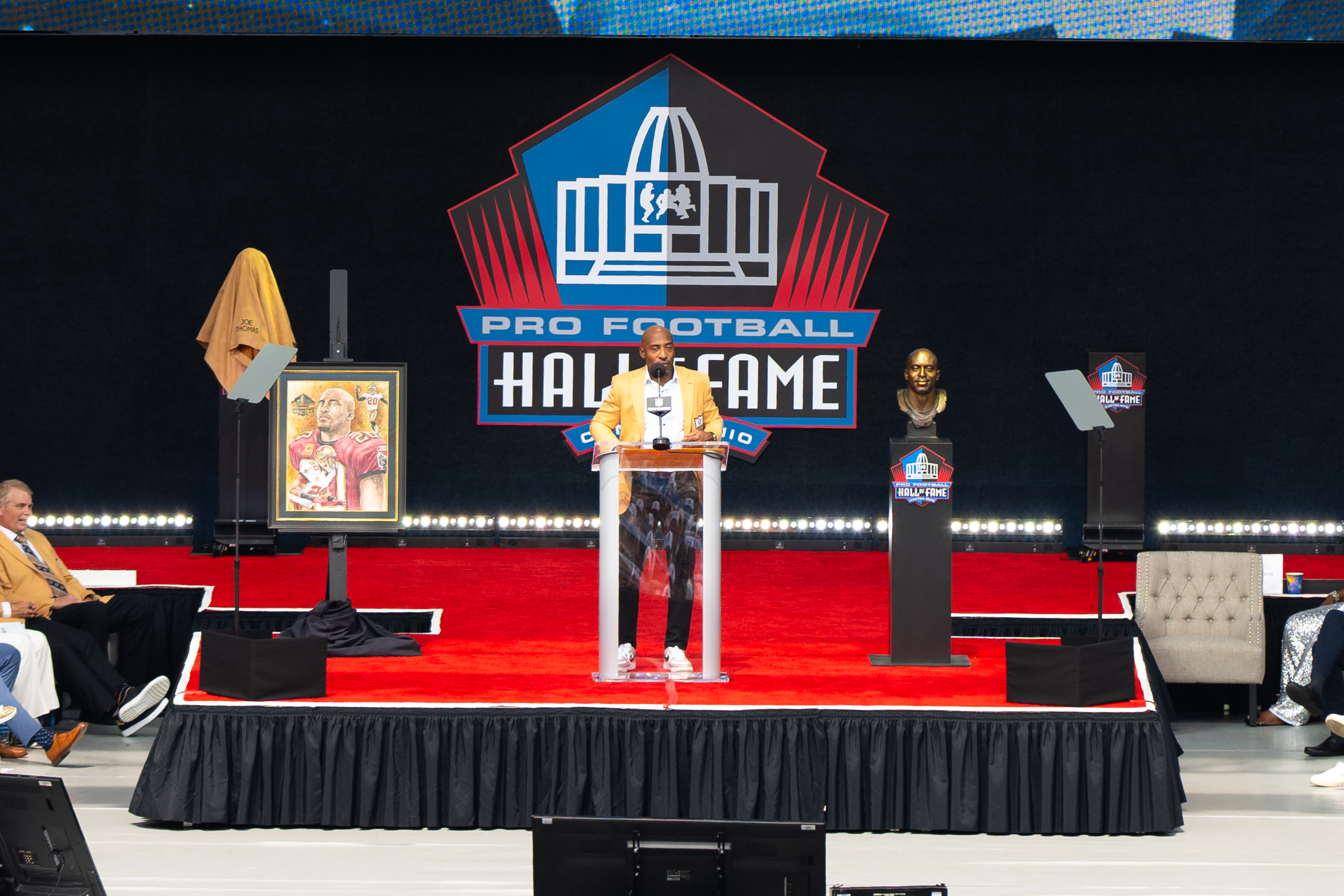
Barber being inducted into the Pro Football Hall of Fame.

In this season's roster, Barber was the only member of the Super Bowl XXXVII championship team still active with the team. Responding to media speculation about retirement, Barber commented in December: "I'm not ready to make a decision on it. I'm pretty sure it will play itself out when the time comes."

=== Retirement ===
On May 8, 2013, Barber announced his retirement. At the time of his retirement, he was the active leader in defensive touchdowns scored, with 14.

== NFL career statistics ==
Legend
	Won the Super Bowl
	Led the league
**Bold**	Career high
Underline	Incomplete data

=== Regular season ===
Year	Team	Games		Tackles							Interceptions						Fumbles					AllTD
Year	Team	GP	GS	Cmb	Solo	Ast	TFL	QBH	Sck	Sfty	PD	Int	Yds	Y/I	Lng	TD	FF	FR	Yds	Y/F	TD	AllTD
1997	TB	1	0	4	4	0	—	—	0.0	0	—	0	0	—	0	0	0	0	0	—	0	0
1998	TB	16	9	70	59	11	—	—	3.0	0	—	2	67	33.5	56	0	2	0	0	—	0	1
1999	TB	16	15	78	62	16	5	—	1.0	0	18	2	60	30.0	43	0	0	0	0	—	0	0
2000	TB	16	16	87	72	15	7	—	**5.5**	0	13	2	46	23.0	37	1	1	1	24	**24.0**	1	**2**
2001	TB	16	16	72	59	13	6	—	1.0	0	**24**	**10**	86	8.6	36	1	1	**2**	0	0.0	0	1
2002	TB	16	16	79	67	12	9	—	3.0	0	20	2	9	4.5	9	0	0	0	0	—	0	0
2003	TB	16	16	**100**	81	19	7	—	1.5	0	6	2	53	26.5	29	1	**3**	1	0	0.0	0	1
2004	TB	16	16	99	84	15	8	—	3.0	0	13	3	23	7.7	23	0	1	**2**	27	13.5	**2**	**2**
2005	TB	16	16	99	83	16	2	—	2.0	0	20	5	105	21.0	42	0	0	1	4	4.0	0	0
2006	TB	16	16	**100**	**85**	15	5	1	0.0	0	16	3	103	34.3	66	**2**	2	0	0	—	0	**2**
2007	TB	16	16	58	48	10	1	1	1.0	0	14	2	32	16.0	29	1	1	**2**	**33**	16.5	1	**2**
2008	TB	16	16	75	67	8	5	**6**	2.0	0	12	4	69	17.3	65	1	0	1	2	2.0	0	1
2009	TB	16	16	77	69	8	9	4	2.0	0	6	0	0	—	0	0	2	1	0	0.0	0	1
2010	TB	16	16	82	66	16	**10**	5	1.0	0	13	3	98	32.7	64	0	0	0	0	—	0	0
2011	TB	16	16	79	67	12	6	1	1.0	**1**	9	3	12	4.0	12	0	1	1	0	0.0	0	0
2012	TB	16	16	92	71	**21**	8	0	1.0	0	13	4	**160**	**40.0**	**78**	1	1	0	0	—	0	1
Career		241	232	1,251	1,044	207	88	18	28.0	1	197	47	923	19.6	78	8	15	12	90	7.5	4	14

- Barber returned a blocked punt for a touchdown, which is officially recognized as a punt return touchdown as the ball traveled past the line of scrimmage.
- Barber did not start the week 10 game vs the Kansas City Chiefs, as such his record streak of consecutive starts did not begin until the week 11 game vs the Atlanta Falcons.

=== Postseason ===
Year	Team	Games		Tackles						Interceptions						FF
Year	Team	GP	GS	Cmb	Solo	Ast	TFL	QBH	Sck	PD	Int	Yds	Y/I	Lng	TD	FF
1997	TB	1	0	0	0	0	—	—	0.0	—	0	0	—	0	0	—
1999	TB	2	2	**12**	**10**	2	**2**	—	0.0	2	0	0	—	0	0	0
2000	TB	1	1	4	3	1	0	—	0.0	—	0	0	—	0	0	0
2001	TB	1	1	3	1	2	0	—	0.0	1	0	0	—	0	0	0
2002	TB	3	3	11	9	2	0	—	**1.0**	**10**	**2**	**117**	**58.5**	**92**	**1**	**2**
2005	TB	1	1	8	5	**3**	0	—	0.0	—	0	0	—	0	0	0
2007	TB	1	1	6	4	2	0	**0**	0.0	—	0	0	—	0	0	0
Career		10	9	44	32	12	2	0	1.0	13	2	117	58.5	92	1	2

=== NFL records ===
- Most consecutive starts by a cornerback: 215 (224 including playoffs), 1999–2012
- Only player in NFL history with 45+ interceptions and 25+ sacks

=== Buccaneers franchise records ===
- Most interceptions in a single season: 10 (2001)
- Most interceptions in a career: 47
- Most pass deflections in a career: 197
- 2nd most fumble recoveries in a career: 12
- Most non-offensive touchdowns in a career: 14
- Most starts in a career (any position): 232 (1997–2012)
- Most games played in a career (any position): 241 (1997–2012)
- Most sacks by a cornerback in a career: 28
- Most interceptions in a game: 3 (tied with Aqib Talib and Andrew Adams)
- Most fumble return touchdowns in a season: 2 (tied with Ndamukong Suh and Devin White)

== Other work ==
In 2010, Barber appeared on the satirical sports show The Onion Sportsdome.

After his retirement, Barber joined Fox Sports as an NFL color analyst. From 2013 to 2019 he called NFL on Fox telecasts with Chris Myers and Kenny Albert, and contributed to studio programming on Fox Sports 1. In 2025, Barber launched an internet show and podcast, "The Rondé Barber Show," on WFLA-TV.

Since 2004, Ronde Barber has co-written eight children's books with his brother Tiki:

- By My Brother's Side (2004)
- Game Day (2005)
- Teammates (2006)
- Kickoff! (2007)
- Go Long! (2008)
- Wild Card (2009)
- Red Zone (2010)
- Goal Line (2011)

== Personal life ==
He is the identical twin brother of former NFL running back Tiki Barber.

Ronde Barber lives in Keystone, Florida. In Spring 2001 he married Filipino American Claudia Patron. She was a marketing and event planner. She is now with Diabetic Charitable Services. They have two daughters Yammile Rose and Justyce Rosina. On Saturday May 3, 2025, Ronde was the commencement speaker and received an honorary doctorate from Florida Southern College.
