= Reinard Wilson =

American football player (born 1973)

No. 57, 55
- Position: Linebacker

Personal information
- Born: December 17, 1973 (age 52); Gainesville, Florida, U.S.
- Listed height: 6 ft 2 in (1.88 m)
- Listed weight: 272 lb (123 kg)

Career information
- High school: Columbia (Lake City, Florida)
- College: Florida State
- NFL draft: 1997: 1st round, 14th overall pick

Career history
- Cincinnati Bengals (1997–2002); Tampa Bay Buccaneers (2003)

Awards and highlights
- National champion (1993); Consensus All-American (1996); 2× First-team All-ACC (1995, 1996)

Career NFL statistics
- Games played: 93
- Games started: 23
- Tackles: 173
- Sacks: 24
- Forced fumbles: 7
- Stats at Pro Football Reference

James Reinard Wilson (born December 17, 1973) is an American former professional football player who was a linebacker in the National Football League (NFL) for six seasons during the late 1990s and early 2000s. He played college football for the Florida State Seminoles and was recognized as a consensus All-American. He was picked by the Cincinnati Bengals in the first round of the 1997 NFL draft, and played professionally for the Bengals and Tampa Bay Buccaneers of the NFL.

== Early life ==
Wilson was born in Gainesville, Florida. He attended Columbia High School in Lake City, Florida, where he was a standout high school football player for the Columbia Tigers.

== College career ==
Wilson received an athletic scholarship to attend Florida State University, where he played for coach Bobby Bowden's Seminoles teams from 1993 to 1996. As a senior in 1996, he was recognized as a consensus first-team All-American after recording thirteen sacks in his final college season.

== Professional career ==
The Cincinnati Bengals selected Wilson in the first round (14th pick overall) of the 1997 NFL Draft. He played for the Bengals from 1997 to 2002. In six NFL seasons, he appeared in 93 regular season games, started 23 of them, and compiled 173 tackles and 24 quarterback sacks.

Wilson was also a member of the Tampa Bay Buccaneers in 2003, but did not appear in a regular season game for the Buccaneers.

=== NFL statistics ===
Year	Team	Games	Combined tackles	Tackles	Assisted tackles	Sacks	Forced fumbles	Fumble recoveries
1997	CIN	16	23	21	2	3.0	1	0
1998	CIN	16	64	47	17	6.0	2	0
1999	CIN	15	21	14	7	3.0	1	0
2000	CIN	14	15	9	6	3.0	2	1
2001	CIN	16	40	28	12	9.0	1	2
2002	CIN	16	14	12	2	0.0	0	0
Career		93	177	131	46	24.0	7	3
