= Anthony Simmons (American football) =

American football player (born 1976)

No. 51
- Position: Linebacker

Personal information
- Born: June 20, 1976 (age 50); Spartanburg, South Carolina, U.S.
- Listed height: 6 ft 0 in (1.83 m)
- Listed weight: 240 lb (109 kg)

Career information
- High school: Spartanburg (SC)
- College: Clemson
- NFL draft: 1998: 1st round, 15th overall pick

Career history
- Seattle Seahawks (1998–2004); New Orleans Saints (2006)*
- * Offseason or practice squad member only

Awards and highlights
- PFWA All-Rookie Team (1998); Consensus All-American (1997); First-team All-American (1996); Third-team All-American (1995); 3× First-team All-ACC (1995–1997); ACC Rookie of the Year (1995)

Career NFL statistics
- Games played: 87
- Games started: 79
- Tackles: 595
- Sacks: 10
- Interceptions: 9
- Stats at Pro Football Reference

Anthony Lamont Simmons (born June 20, 1976) is an American former professional football player who was a linebacker in the National Football League (NFL) for seven seasons. He played college football for Clemson University, and earned All-American honors. He was selected in the first round of the 1998 NFL draft, and he played professionally for the Seattle Seahawks, and briefly, the New Orleans Saints of the NFL.

== Early life ==
Simmons was born in Spartanburg, South Carolina. He attended Spartanburg High School, where he played for the Spartanburg Vikings high school football team and helped lead the Vikings to their first of three consecutive state championships.

== College career ==
Simmons attended Clemson University, and played for the Clemson Tigers football team. As a freshman in 1995, Simmons earned the starting job at inside linebacker after just five days of practice. He finished the season with 150 tackles, and became the first defensive player ever to be named UPI's national freshman of the year, and received first-team All-Atlantic Coast Conference (ACC) honors. As a sophomore, he set the Tigers' record for tackles in a season (178) en route to being named an All-American, and earning another first-team All-ACC selection.

Simmons became one of the premier players in the nation as a junior, and was recognized as a consensus first-team All-American. He led both Clemson and the ACC in tackles (158) and tackles for loss (25) en route to a third-consecutive first-team All-ACC selection. He also led the Tigers in quarterback sacks (8).

== Professional career ==
Pre-draft measurables
Height	Weight	Arm length	Hand span	40-yard dash	20-yard shuttle	Three-cone drill	Vertical jump	Broad jump	Bench press
6 ft 0 1/8 in (1.83 m)	231 lb (105 kg)	32 3/4 in (0.83 m)	9 7/8 in (0.25 m)	4.28 s	3.97 s	7.35 s	34.5 in (0.88 m)	10 ft 7 in (3.23 m)	22 reps

Simmons ran a 4.28 and a 4.34 forty-yard dash for scout Larry Greenlee. His speed was part of the reason Simmons was selected in the first round (15th overall) of the 1998 NFL draft by the Seattle Seahawks. He led the Seahawks in tackles in 2000, 2001, and 2003. He was released by the Seahawks after the 2004 season and sat out 2005 due to injury. He then signed with the New Orleans Saints before the 2006 season but ended up retiring before the season started. He finished his career with 591 tackles (455 solo), 10 sacks, 34.5 tackles for loss, seven forced fumbles, one fumble recovery, 27 pass deflections, nine interceptions for 131 yards, and two touchdowns in just 87 games.

=== NFL statistics ===
Year	Team	GP	Tackles				Fumbles		Interceptions					
Year	Team	GP	Comb	Solo	Ast	Sack	FF	FR	Int	Yds	Avg	Lng	TD	PD
1998	SEA	12	41	31	10	0.0	0	0	1	36	36.0	36	1	2
1999	SEA	16	92	57	35	0.0	0	0	0	0	0.0	0	0	3
2000	SEA	16	147	119	28	4.0	2	0	2	15	7.5	8	0	2
2001	SEA	16	121	101	20	2.0	2	0	0	0	0.0	0	0	7
2002	SEA	7	45	34	11	1.0	1	0	2	19	9.5	15	0	2
2003	SEA	13	99	79	20	3.0	1	1	3	38	12.7	33	0	7
2004	SEA	7	41	29	12	0.0	1	0	1	23	23.0	23	1	3
Career		87	586	450	136	10.0	7	1	9	131	14.6	36	2	26
