= Tiki Barber =

American football player (born 1975)

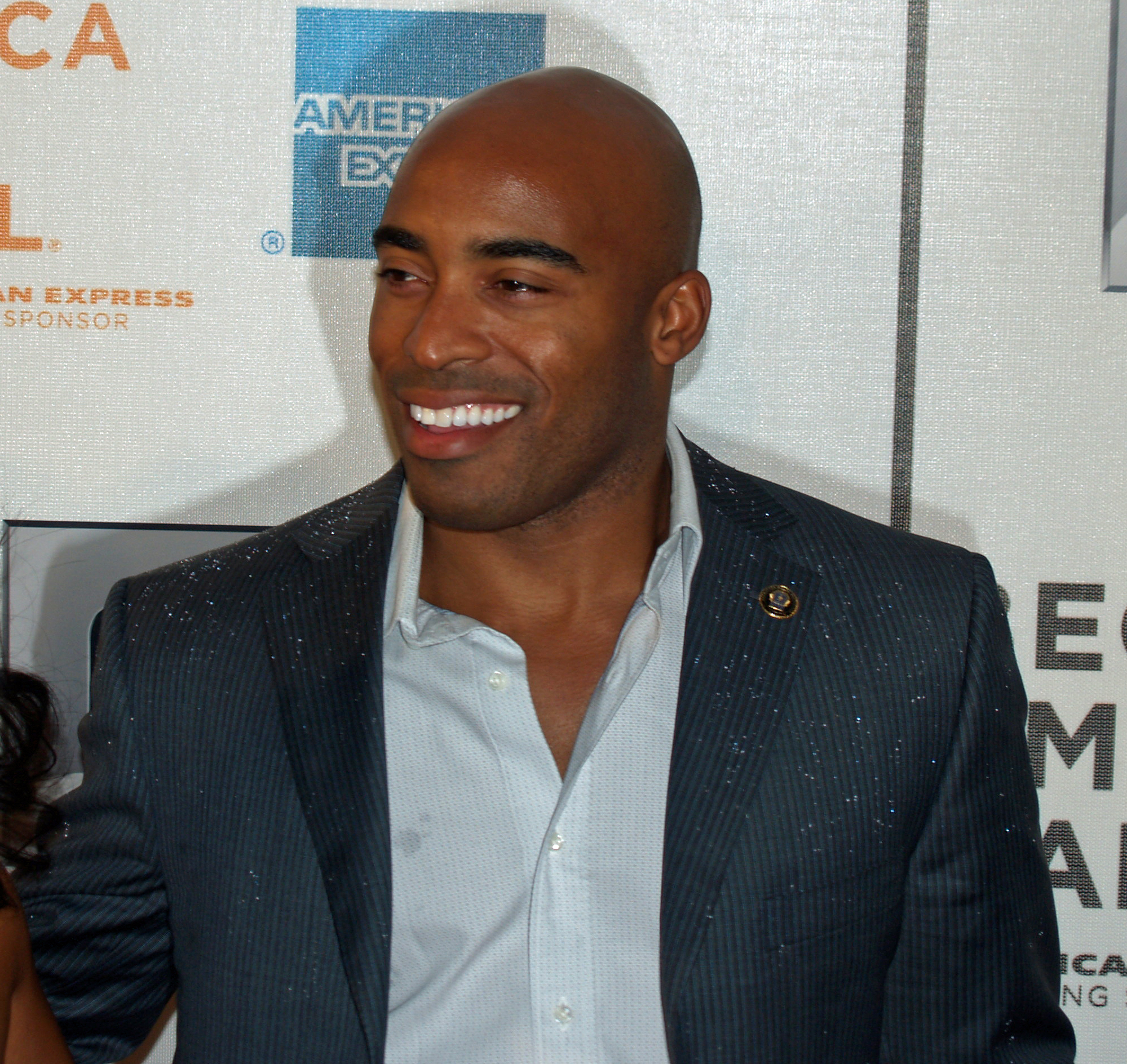
- Barber at the Tribeca Film Festival in 2007

No. 21
- Position: Running back

Personal information
- Born: April 7, 1975 (age 51); Roanoke, Virginia, U.S.
- Listed height: 5 ft 10 in (1.78 m)
- Listed weight: 205 lb (93 kg)

Career information
- High school: Cave Spring (Roanoke)
- College: Virginia (1993–1996)
- NFL draft: 1997: 2nd round, 36th overall pick

Career history
- New York Giants (1997–2006)

Awards and highlights
- First-team All-Pro (2005); 3× Pro Bowl (2004–2006); New York Giants Ring of Honor; 14th greatest New York Giant of all-time; ACC Player of the Year (1996); ACC Offensive Player of the Year (1996); 2× First-team All-ACC (1995, 1996); ACC 50th Anniversary Team; Dudley Award (1996); Virginia Cavaliers Jersey No. 21 retired

Career NFL statistics
- Rushing yards: 10,449
- Rushing average: 4.7
- Rushing touchdowns: 55
- Receptions: 586
- Receiving yards: 5,183
- Receiving touchdowns: 12
- Stats at Pro Football Reference

Atiim Kiambu "Tiki" Barber Sr. (/ˈtiːki/; born April 7, 1975) is an American former professional football player who spent his entire 10-year career as a running back for the New York Giants of the National Football League (NFL). He played college football for the Virginia Cavaliers. Barber was selected by the Giants in the second round of the 1997 NFL draft. He retired from the NFL at the end of the 2006 NFL postseason as the Giants' all-time rushing and reception leader. He is the only player in NFL history to have 10,000 rushing yards, 5,000 receiving yards, and 1,000 return yards. Barber was inducted into the Virginia Sports Hall of Fame in 2011.

After his playing career, Barber became a national media presence, joining NBC's The Today Show as a correspondent in 2007, then Football Night in America/Sunday Night Football. He has published several children's books with identical twin brother Ronde Barber, including By My Brother's Side (2004).

== College career ==
Barber attended the University of Virginia on an academic scholarship to major in commerce. Barber became an accomplished college athlete; he broke the University of Virginia's long jump record on his first jump, and put the University of Virginia's football program back on the map.

Barber rushed for almost 1,400 yards in his junior season, helping lead the Cavaliers to a share of the ACC title.

During his senior year, he rushed for over 1,300 yards and was named ACC Player of the Year.

Barber finished his college career with 651 carries for 3,389 yards and 31 touchdowns, and 64 receptions for 602 yards with two touchdowns.

During Barber's time at UVa, he was a member of the IMP Society, one of the university's secret societies.

== Professional career ==
Pre-draft measurables
Height	Weight	Arm length	Hand span	40-yard dash	10-yard split	20-yard split	20-yard shuttle	Three-cone drill	Vertical jump	Broad jump	Bench press
5 ft 9 3/8 in (1.76 m)	203 lb (92 kg)	31 3/4 in (0.81 m)	9 1/2 in (0.24 m)	4.56 s	1.60 s	2.67 s	4.00 s	7.18 s	35.5 in (0.90 m)	10 ft 0 in (3.05 m)	15 reps
All values from NFL Combine

Originally he was considered a third-down, "change of pace" back, but Barber became a standout starting running back and the all-time leader in rushing yards in New York Giants history. In 2005, he was the NFL's top yardage gainer from the line of scrimmage. Barber was voted by his peers to three Pro Bowls. From 2003 to 2006, Barber gained the most yards from scrimmage by any NFL running back in that four-year period.

=== 1997–1999 ===
Barber was selected by the New York Giants in the second round of the 1997 NFL draft, out of the University of Virginia. He was originally intended to be a third-down running back until Rodney Hampton had disappointing years in 1996 and 1997. Hampton retired after the 1997 season, giving Barber the starting nod. He began his career with a mediocre rookie campaign, in which he started at running back and rushed for 511 yards and three touchdowns. Barber missed four games with a knee injury, but returned to the starting lineup for the final two games of the year. In 1998, he was replaced as a starter and went through a disappointing, injury-riddled year before rebounding in 1999, when he accumulated 1,639 all-purpose yards, utilizing his punt return and receiving skills.

=== 2000–2004 ===
Barber and the Giants represented the NFC in Super Bowl XXXV in 2001, but lost the game to the Baltimore Ravens. Established as a starter and playmaker, Barber was rewarded with a six-year contract from the Giants following the 2000 season. Following the signing, he called himself "the happiest man in New York right now."

Over the next four years, Barber would become an integral part of the Giants' offense. In the last regular season game of 2002, Tiki exploded for 203 yards against the Philadelphia Eagles, at that time one of the league's best defenses. His performance helped the Giants clinch a playoff berth, but the team fell to the San Francisco 49ers in the wild-card round. He ended the season with 1,984 yards from scrimmage.

The 2003 NFL season saw the Giants finish 4–12.

During the 2004 NFL season, Barber reached the end zone for a career-high 15 touchdowns. He also rushed for 1,518 yards and notched 578 receiving yards for 2,096 total yards from scrimmage. On January 2, 2005, in the 2004 season finale, at home versus the Dallas Cowboys, Barber broke Rodney Hampton's Giants' all-time rushing record and Joe Morris's single-season rushing record in the same game. Poignantly, Barber broke the record on the final offensive play of the game, when he scored a game-winning touchdown to end an otherwise dismal 6–10 season for the Giants on a high note.

=== 2005 season ===
The 2005 season was a rebound year for the Giants and for Barber's career year in terms of rushing yards. Led by Eli Manning and Barber, they finished 11-5 and won the NFC East title for the first time since 2000. On December 17, 2005, Barber broke the Giants' single-game rushing record against the Kansas City Chiefs, rushing for 220 yards; he would break his own record the following year. It was his second (of three) 200-yard rushing games during the 2005 season, as he ran for 206 yards in week 8. The Giants promptly shut out the Washington Redskins 36-0 two days after Wellington Mara was buried, proper homage to their beloved owner, to whom Tiki himself was especially close.

He finished the 2005 regular season with 1,860 rushing yards (second in the league to Shaun Alexander and a career-high for Barber) and 2,390 all-purpose yards with a performance of 203 rushing yards against the Oakland Raiders in the final game of the season. Barber's 95-yard touchdown run set a Giants' team record for longest touchdown run, previously held by Hap Moran for a 91-yard run on November 23, 1930, vs the Green Bay Packers.

His 960 yards from scrimmage in December 2005 was an NFL record until it was broken by Chris Johnson, who had 968 from scrimmage in November 2009.

The Giants were shut out 23–0 to the Carolina Panthers in the wild-card round of the playoffs.

Barber's 2,390 total yards for 2005 was second highest in NFL history, at the time, behind Marshall Faulk's 2,429 total yards in 1999. It is also the highest total for a running back 30 years of age or older. He was named to the NFC Pro Bowl squad for the second time in his career, and was voted an All Pro. Barber placed fourth in the voting for the 2005 MVP award. Seattle Seahawks running back Shaun Alexander won the Award, followed by Peyton Manning (second place) and Tom Brady (third place).

He was nominated for the 2005 FedEx Ground Player of the Year Award, along with LaDainian Tomlinson and Shaun Alexander. Barber also signed a contract extension in September 2005 which extended his contract through 2008 and increased his pay.

=== 2006 season ===
In the 2006 season, Barber continued his fine play in his final season and final games as an NFL player, a rarity for running backs who often break down late in their careers. His total yardage on the season was higher than any other running back in history in their last season.

Barber rushed for 1,662 yards and five touchdowns in his 2006 campaign. During week 14 at Carolina, Barber rushed for 112 yards to help the Giants end a four-game losing skid. Tiki's best game in 2006 was in Week 17 at Washington, where he rushed for 234 yards and 4 touchdowns in the Giants 34–28 victory against the Redskins, a win that gave the Giants a playoff berth. In that game, Tiki set a new team record for rushing yards in a single game by breaking his own record, which he had set the previous year versus Kansas City. His 234 rushing yards are the most ever by a player over 30 years old. He also holds the record for most 200-yard rushing games by a player over 30 years old with four. Only three other players have one.

In his final game with the Giants, a playoff loss to the Philadelphia Eagles, Barber rushed for 137 yards on 26 carries. After the game, Eagles safety Brian Dawkins embraced Barber and told him, "You're a warrior." Barber has stated a tackle from Eagles middle linebacker Jeremiah Trotter during the 2006 season confirmed his decision to retire.

As a Pro Bowler in his final season, Barber's last official game was the 2007 Pro Bowl on February 10, 2007, in Hawaii.

=== NFL retirement ===
In October 2006, Barber revealed his intention to retire at the end of the 2006 NFL season. Barber had previously indicated his desire to retire at some point and pursue a broadcasting career. When questioned why a player at the peak of his game would retire, Barber cited the toll the physical nature of football takes on a person's body and that he "simply couldn't take it anymore." He officially filed his retirement papers with the Players Association on February 12, 2007.

During his career with the Giants, the team never won a championship, a top goal of Barber's that he spoke publicly about in 2005. When announcing his retirement, Barber seemed at peace to leave the game without a Super Bowl ring. He said, "I used to think my career was defined by not winning a Super Bowl. But I think looking back on my career, they'll see someone who was a competitor, someone who always played hard and never gave up."

In the very next NFL season following Barber's retirement, the New York Giants went on to defeat the previously undefeated 18–0 New England Patriots to win Super Bowl XLII in one of the greatest upsets in sports history. Barber was present to cover the event, but was not well received by most of his former teammates and Giants' fans, after his disparaging remarks about his former teammate and Giants quarterback, Eli Manning.

=== Attempted NFL return ===
On March 8, 2011, Barber filed paperwork to come out of retirement. Although the New York Giants still retained the rights to Barber, the Giants planned to release him once the NFL and the NFLPA reached a collective bargaining agreement.

On April 28, 2011, Barber said that his comeback was "not about the money;" however, the New York Post ran a contradictory news story in 2010, reporting that Barber was seeking to return to the NFL because he was not financially solvent. The story said that he was unable to pay his divorce settlement with his ex-wife.

On July 28, 2011, the Giants officially removed Barber from the retired list, allowing him to sign with any team. On August 2, 2011, Barber began working out with the Miami Dolphins.

On September 5, 2011, Barber's agent, Mark Lepselter, confirmed that no NFL team was interested in signing him.

== NFL career statistics ==
Legend
	Led the league
**Bold**	Career high

Year	Team	Games		Rushing					Receiving					Fumbles	
Year	Team	GP	GS	Att	Yds	Avg	Lng	TD	Rec	Yds	Avg	Lng	TD	Fum	Lost
1997	NYG	12	6	136	511	3.8	42	3	34	299	8.8	29	1	2	1
1998	NYG	16	4	52	166	3.2	23	0	42	348	8.3	**87**	**3**	1	0
1999	NYG	16	1	62	258	4.2	30	0	66	609	9.2	56	2	1	0
2000	NYG	16	12	213	1,006	4.7	78	8	70	**719**	10.3	36	1	5	3
2001	NYG	14	9	166	865	**5.2**	36	4	**72**	577	8.0	44	0	3	1
2002	NYG	16	15	304	1,387	4.6	70	11	69	597	8.7	38	0	5	**5**
2003	NYG	16	16	278	1,216	4.4	27	2	69	461	8.7	36	1	**6**	**5**
2004	NYG	16	14	322	1,518	4.7	72	**13**	52	578	**11.1**	62	2	5	2
2005	NYG	16	16	**357**	**1,860**	**5.2**	**95**	9	54	530	9.8	48	2	1	1
2006	NYG	16	16	327	1,662	5.1	55	5	58	465	8.0	28	0	3	1
Total		154	109	2,217	10,449	4.7	95	55	586	5,183	8.8	87	12	32	19

== Career highlights ==
=== Awards and honors ===
NFL

- First-team All-Pro (2005)
- 3× Pro Bowl (2004–2006)
- New York Giants Ring of Honor
- 14th greatest New York Giant of all-time
- PFWA Good Guy Award (2006)

College

- ACC Player of the Year (1996)
- ACC Offensive Player of the Year (1996)
- 2× First-team All-ACC (1995, 1996)
- ACC 50th Anniversary Team
- Dudley Award (1996)
- Virginia Cavaliers Jersey No. 21 retired

=== Giants franchise records ===
As of 2018, Barber held at least 22 Giants franchise records, including:

- Most Rush Attempts (career): 2,217
- Most Rush Attempts (season): 357 (2005)
- Most Rush Yards (career): 10,449
- Most Rush Yards (season): 1,860 (2005)
- Most Rush Yards (game): 234 (2006-12-30 @WAS)
- Most Rush Yds/Att (career): 4.71
- Most Rush Yds/Att (playoff season): 5.27 (2006)
- Most Rush Yds/Game (career): 67.9
- Most Rush Yds/Game (season): 116.3 (2005)
- Most Rush Yds/Game (playoff season): 137 (2006)
- Most Yds from Scrimmage (career): 15,632
- Most Yds from Scrimmage (season): 2,390 (2005)
- Most Yds from Scrimmage (game): 258 (2006-12-30 @WAS)
- Most Yds from Scrimmage (playoff career): 671
- Most All Purpose Yds (career): 17,359
- Most All Purpose Yds (season): 2,390 (2005)
- Most All Purpose Yds (game): 258 (2006-12-30 @WAS)
- Most Punt Ret Yds (season): 506 (1999)
- Most 100+ yard rushing games (career): 40
- Most 100+ yard rushing games (season): 9 (2004 and 2006; tied with Joe Morris)
- Most 100+ yard rushing games (playoffs): 2 (tied with Ottis Anderson and Joe Morris)
- Most 1000+ rushing yard seasons (career): 6

== Player profile ==
=== Running style ===
Starting from his breakout season in 2000, Barber was known for his exceptional cutback running, quick feet, and running vision. He also was an adept receiver out of the backfield with over 450 receiving yards and over 50 receptions every season from 2000 to 2006.

After the 2003 year, in spite of his rushing yard totals, Barber had a tendency to commit fumbles. He committed nine fumbles and six lost fumbles in the 2002 and 2003 seasons, respectively. This also includes three lost fumbles in a game against the Philadelphia Eagles on December 28, 2002. When head coach Tom Coughlin arrived, he taught Barber to hold the ball vertically instead of horizontally, a practice taken from rugby football. After making this change, his fumbles went down significantly. In 2004, he only had two lost fumbles and proceeded to commit only four lost fumbles in his three years with Coughlin.

Barber began to focus on strength training and lifting in 2004 upon the suggestion of his new running backs coach, Jerald Ingram. Barber began to work with a strength coach, Joe Carini, in New Jersey. His added upper-body strength allowed him to break more tackles and improve as a running-back. Barber improved in other ways over the course of his career. He refined upon his patience during game-play, which is needed in football to wait for blocks to set and formed holes to emerge in the offensive line before accelerating forward. Barber also improved upon his physical toughness and blocking ability, as he was not known for being skilled in them earlier in his career. Barber additionally benefited from an improved offensive line and Coughlin's emphasis on the Giants' new strategic running game.

=== Strahan contract controversy ===
In 2002, All-Pro Giants defensive end Michael Strahan was negotiating a new contract, and Tiki Barber publicly criticized Michael Strahan's negotiating stance. He felt Strahan should have agreed to the contract the Giants offered and remarked that Strahan was greedy. The contract impacted the team as Strahan's cap number exceeded $12 million and the new contract would have lowered Strahan's cap number, greatly helping the team get under the 2002 Salary Cap. "I don't know if he realizes how much $17 million is," Barber told the NY Post. "That is absolutely ridiculous, to turn that down. He's already the highest-paid defensive player in the league. He's already making more than most quarterbacks...Michael is not thinking about the team; he's thinking about himself".

Keith Hamilton, a teammate of Strahan and Barber at the time, then responded with comments critical of Barber. Players generally believe that they should not speak about the contracts of other players. Beyond that, some members of the Giants defense harbored resentment of the offense, which was lackluster and unproductive in the 1990s. "The defense has carried the offense, carried the team, since I've been here," Hamilton told The Star-Ledger. "[Barber] hasn't been here long enough or done enough to say anything. For him to shoot his mouth off, acting like he's Mr. New York, yeah, I'm ticked off. Strahan is the single-season sack record-holder. He's the AP Defensive Player of the Year. He's one of the best—if not the best—defensive ends in the game. And you tell me this guy is being greedy? That's a bunch of crap. I've heard enough. Who is Tiki Barber to shoot his mouth off? What has he done? He talks like he's acting in the best interest of the team. Tell him to give his $7 million (signing bonus) back. Since he's so charitable, why doesn't he volunteer his $7 million? He says all the politically correct things. Ask him if he's giving up some of his money." Despite this incident, Strahan and Barber are currently friendly with each other in public.

=== Coaching criticism ===
Although Barber's statistics improved greatly after Tom Coughlin became the Giants' head coach, Barber disliked and criticized Coughlin's coaching style. During the coach's tenure, Barber publicly questioned the team's coaching on two occasions. After being shut out at home in the first round of the 2005 playoffs by the Carolina Panthers, Tiki made a post-game comment that he felt the Giants had been outcoached by their former defensive coordinator, the Panthers' head coach John Fox. Heavy sports media attention was placed on the comment; Tiki apologized for it shortly afterwards, saying he only meant to convey the Giants' performance was 'unacceptable.'

After a loss to the Jacksonville Jaguars during the 2006 season, Barber criticized the playcalling for abandoning the running game too soon. Both times Coughlin and Barber met to discuss the comments.

On the eve of what would be his last game with the Giants, Barber told ESPN that he is "demeaned and talked down to" by Coughlin.

After retiring, Barber attributed his decision to retire to Coughlin's unrelenting style in practice. "(Coughlin) pushed me in the direction (of television)," said Barber. "I don't know if you realize this, but we were in full pads for 17 weeks, and with the amount of injuries that we had, it just takes a toll on you. You physically don't want to be out there, when your body feels the way you do, in full pads."

The Giants went on to win the Super Bowl the year following Barber's retirement.

== Post-football career ==
=== Broadcasting ===
After retiring from the NFL, Barber began a second career as a television broadcaster. Barber immediately landed a role with NBC in which he contributed to the Today program, covered sports for NBC Sports, and hosted entertainment events for NBC Universal. Barber was introduced as a correspondent for NBC's Today and analyst for Football Night in America/Sunday Night Football on February 13, 2007. This came after a competition for his services was waged between ABC, FOX, NFL, and NBC. As a Today correspondent, Barber anchored lifestyle segments and reports on news stories.

Barber is unusual among retired athletes in his desire to cover hard news and political stories; in 2006 Barber cited a lunch with Secretary of State Condoleezza Rice as the highlight of his year.

While still an NFL player, Barber gained broadcasting experience. On television, he co-hosted the morning news program Fox & Friends on select Tuesday mornings. On radio, he hosted Barber Shop a weekly show on Sirius Satellite Radio with his brother Ronde during the football season. In the offseason, he hosted a political and general interest radio program; Senator John McCain was his first interview. Barber originally began his broadcasting career on WFAN radio and the WCBS local news in New York.

In May 2008, Barber filled the spot of Willie Geist on the MSNBC program Morning Joe while Geist was on vacation.

In August 2008, Barber helped broadcast the 2008 Summer Olympics on MSNBC and was a commentator for Yahoo! sports for the 2010 Winter Olympics.

On Wednesday, June 23, 2010, the New York Post reported that NBC dropped him from his contributor's role on NBC's The Today Show. Barber was quietly let go in May 2010 by the network after his contract was not renewed by NBC earlier that year.

Barber appeared as a studio pundit on the BBC's Super Bowl XLV coverage.

In 2019, Barber began to appear on the NFL on CBS as a game analyst. Barber left CBS in 2025 to join the New York Giants Radio Network.

In January 2022, Barber became a radio co-host for WFAN with Brandon Tierney, on weekday afternoons airing 10-2 pm (EST). The pair previously hosted a national show on CBS Sports Radio.

In June 2023, the New York Post broke the news that Barber would take the spot of Craig Carton on afternoon drive at WFAN with Evan Roberts beginning in July 2023. As of March 2024, Evan and Tiki currently host the WFAN afternoon drive program.

=== Miscellaneous TV appearances ===
Barber is a frequent judge on the Food Network show Iron Chef America, along with the show Chopped.

Barber appeared as a guest judge on Project Runway. The challenge was to design Barber a dress shirt to wear on the Today Show.

Barber appeared with his family on NBC's show Celebrity Family Feud which premiered on June 24, 2008.

Barber appeared as the guest in the "Not My Job" section of the NPR news quiz show Wait Wait... Don't Tell Me! in November 2008. He answered three questions about Mickey Mouse on the occasion of Mickey's 80th birthday.

Barber was the 'mobile shout out' on an episode of the Discovery Channel game show Cash Cab. The question was "What is the name of the famous John Steinbeck novel that followed the travels of Tom Joad?". Both Barber and the contestant incorrectly answered with Lonesome Dove by Larry McMurtry; the correct answer was The Grapes of Wrath.

In the 2008 series Knight Rider, Barber played a drill sergeant who was murdered during an underground MMA fight in the episode "Fight Knight". His character was filmed dressing down an unseen private and used by KITT to distract the owner of the illegal club long enough to allow for capture by Michael. He was also spoofed by KITT at the end of the episode.

Barber appears in multiple episodes as himself in the 2009 iteration of The Electric Company. His "character" is adored by women and adolescents alike and is portrayed as a very likable and forthright role model. One episode even puts him in the role of a judge, trying a case of pet negligence towards his bird.

In 2009 he guest starred on the Wow! Wow! Wubbzy! episode “What a Card”, playing a fictionalized version of himself known as Touchdown Tiki.

In the Dave Matthews Band music video for their 2001 single "Everyday," Barber was featured as one of the people being hugged.

In 2014, Barber appeared as himself in Orange Is the New Black in the Season 2 episode "It Was the Change" which was the 12th episode of the season.

Barber co-hosted season 2 of Ultimate Beastmaster with Chris Distefano and season 3 with CM Punk.

Barber and his wife Traci appear in Season 12 of The Real Housewives of New Jersey.

=== Theater ===
Barber made his Broadway debut as Don in Kinky Boots January 21, 2019, and played a limited run until March 3. Barber said in a statement, "I was very fortunate to be part of the New York Giants for ten years and feel incredibly lucky to be joining another New York institution: Broadway."

== Business activities ==
Barber also pursued business and investment opportunities, such as opening a high-tech cycling gym in NYC.

Barber is co-chairman and co-founder of Thuzio, which provides an online marketplace for athletes to be booked for local speaking appearances, coaching, and personal events.

In 2018 Barber co-founded Grove Group Management, a cannabis-focused investment firm that provides various forms of expertise (finance, marketing, operations, retail, legal issues, and product development) to the businesses it invests in. The company aims to work with small and minority-owned cannabis businesses in particular.

== Personal life ==
Barber and his twin brother were born five weeks premature. Tiki was born seven minutes after his identical twin brother Ronde Barber. He was named Atiim Kiambu, which means "fiery-tempered king" because he was screaming shortly after his birth. Ronde was a cornerback who played for the Tampa Bay Buccaneers, winning Super Bowl XXXVII against the Oakland Raiders, and was elected to the NFL Hall of Fame in 2023.

Barber is the son of Geraldine Barber and James Barber. James was a star running back at Virginia Tech and later played in the World Football League. Barber's parents divorced when Barber was very young; his father never provided financial support and rarely saw his sons when they were growing up. His mother Geraldine worked two—sometimes three—jobs to support her three sons. He has an older brother, Tarik Barber.

Barber married his University of Virginia sweetheart Virginia Cha Barber on May 15, 1999, and the couple resided on the Upper East Side New York City with Cha's parents living in an en suite. Cha—of Korean and Vietnamese descent—was a fashion publicist for Zegna, a men's designer-clothing label. They have two sons, A.J. (Atiim Kiambu Junior), born July 8, 2002, and Chason, born March 18, 2004; and twin daughters Riley and Ella, born May 24, 2010.

On April 5, 2010, while Cha was seven months pregnant with their twin daughters, it was announced that Barber and his wife were separating after 11 years of marriage. It later became public that Barber had been cheating on Cha with 23-year-old Traci Lynn Johnson, whom he met while she was an NBC intern and he worked on the Today show. Johnson had babysat Barber's sons.

In the May 30, 2011, issue of Sports Illustrated, Barber described hiding out with Johnson in his agent Mark Lepselter's attic so that he would not get caught. Barber was quoted as saying that "Lep's Jewish, and it was like a reverse Anne Frank thing." Barber's comments were quickly condemned by New York Post sports columnist Mike Vaccaro.

Just eight days after his divorce from Cha was final, on July 20, 2012, Barber and Johnson married in a simple civil ceremony in a New York courtroom. Johnson gave birth to their daughter Brooklyn on December 27, 2013. In July 2016, their second daughter, and Barber's sixth child, Teagan, was born.

In 2014, Barber supported CC Sabathia's charity, the PitCCh In Foundation, by running in the 2014 New York City Marathon. He achieved a 5:14:37 running time.

== Books ==
Tiki: My Life and the Game Beyond, an autobiography co-written by Gil Reavill, was released on September 18, 2007.

Tiki Barber's Pure Hard Workout, a description of his intensive weightlifting program written with his trainer, Joe Carini, was released on November 13, 2008, by Gotham Books.

Barber and his brother Ronde have co-written nine illustrated children's books:

- By My Brother's Side (2004)
- Game Day (2005)
- Teammates (2006)
- Kickoff! (2007)
- Go Long! (2008)
- Wild Card (2009)
- Red Zone (2010)
- Goal Line (2011)
- End Zone (2012)

== See also ==
- History of the New York Giants (1994–present)
- List of National Football League career rushing yards leaders
