= E. G. Green =

American gridiron football player (born 1975)

E.G. Green
No. 84
- Position: Wide receiver

Personal information
- Born: June 28, 1975 (age 51); Fort Walton Beach, Florida, U.S.
- Listed height: 5 ft 11 in (1.80 m)
- Listed weight: 188 lb (85 kg)

Career information
- High school: Fort Walton Beach
- College: Florida State
- NFL draft: 1998: 3rd round, 71st overall pick

Career history
- Indianapolis Colts (1998–2000); Tampa Bay Buccaneers (2002)*; Edmonton Eskimos (2004)*
- * Offseason or practice squad member only

Awards and highlights
- National champion (1993); Second-team All-American (1997); First-team All-ACC (1997); 2× Second-team All-ACC (1995, 1996)

Career NFL statistics
- Receptions: 54
- Receiving yards: 665
- Total touchdowns: 2
- Stats at Pro Football Reference

Ernest G. Green III (born June 28, 1975) is an American former professional football player who was a wide receiver for the Indianapolis Colts of the National Football League (NFL). He played college football for the Florida State Seminoles, earning second-team All-American honors in 1997. He is currently the head football coach at Destin High School in Destin, Florida.

== Early life ==
Green was born on June 28, 1975, in Fort Walton Beach, Florida and attended Fort Walton Beach High School. Along with quarterback and friend Danny Wuerffel, he led the Vikings to an undefeated season and a #2 national ranking by USA Today en route to the Florida AAAA state football championship in 1991.

== College career ==
Green played for coach Bobby Bowden at Florida State University. He redshirted during the 1993 national championship year for the Seminoles. As a redshirt freshman in 1994, Green played in 11 games, catching 18 passes for 192 yards and one touchdown. During his sophomore year in 1995, Green emerged onto the national scene, catching 60 passes for 1007 yards and 10 touchdowns in 11 games. As a junior in 1996, Green and the Seminoles utilized a more run-oriented offense behind halfback Warrick Dunn, but Green pulled in 34 passes for 662 yards and 7 touchdowns in a year that saw the Seminoles play for the national title. In his senior year, Green cemented his place as one of college football's finest receivers with his second 1000-yard season. He ended 1997 with 54 catches for 1059 yards and 11 touchdowns, and was named a 2nd Team All-American by both the Associated Press and the Football News.

Green left Florida State as the Seminoles' all-time leader in receiving touchdowns, with 29 in his career. And with 182 total points, he still stands at 13th on the all-time scoring list at Florida State. During Green's five years as a player, from 1993 to 1997, Florida State amassed a 56–6–1 record.

== Professional career ==
Green was drafted by the Colts in the third round of the 1998 NFL draft, and was the 71st overall pick. He played in 12 games in 1998 and had 15 receptions for 177 yards and one touchdown (an 11.8 yards per reception average). In 1999, Green played in 11 games and had 21 receptions for 287 yards, averaging 13.7 yards per reception. He suffered a fractured leg in the first half of the Colts divisional playoff contest against the eventual AFC champion Tennessee Titans. In 2000, Green's final year with the Colts, he played in only five games and had 18 receptions for 201 yards and one touchdown.

== Coaching career ==
Green was announced as the head football coach for Destin High School on December 15, 2021.
