= 1996 Tampa Bay Buccaneers season =

NFL team season

- Owner: Malcolm Glazer
- General manager: Rich McKay
- Head coach: Tony Dungy
- Offensive coordinator: Mike Shula
- Defensive coordinator: Monte Kiffin
- Home stadium: Houlihan's Stadium

Results
- Record: 6–10
- Division place: 4th NFC Central
- Playoffs: Did not qualify
- All-Pros: FB Mike Alstott, MLB Hardy Nickerson
- Pro Bowlers: 3: MLB Hardy Nickerson; FB Mike Alstott (alternate); P Tommy Barnhardt (alternate)
- Team MVP: MLB Hardy Nickerson

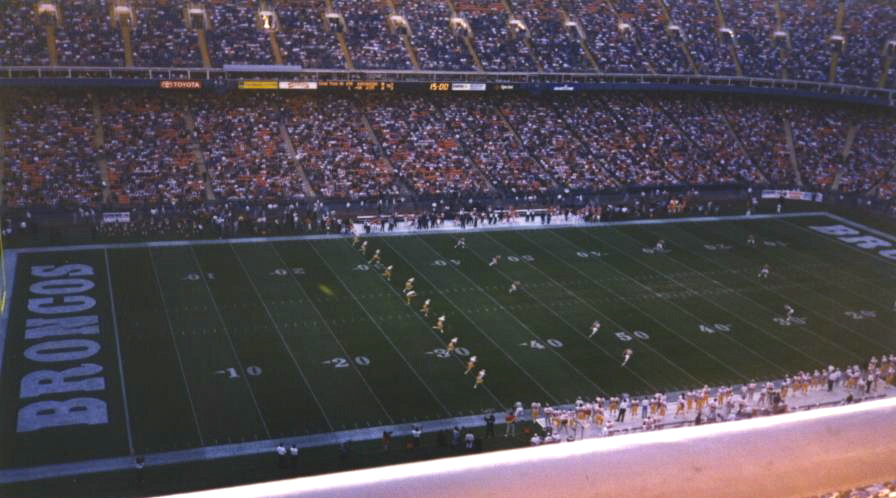
Tampa Bay kicks off while visiting the Denver Broncos at Mile High Stadium, September 15, 1996

The 1996 Tampa Bay Buccaneers season was the team's 21st in the National Football League (NFL). The Buccaneers failed to improve on their 7–9 season in 1995, finishing 6–10. It was the first season under head coach Tony Dungy. The 1996 season marked the final year that the Buccaneers wore their trademark orange, red, and white "creamsicle" uniforms. Until 2010, it was the last time that the Buccaneers failed to sell out any of its home games. Despite Tampa finishing with a losing record, Dungy had restored the competitive spirit in the organization. Five of the ten losses were by a touchdown or less, and the team finished the season winning five of their final seven games.

The Buccaneers would not have another losing season until 2003.

== Offseason ==
Prior to the season the Buccaneers were still unsure if the franchise would remain in the Tampa Bay area long-term. The new ownership family led by Malcolm Glazer and sons, which had purchased the team in January 1995, wanted a new stadium, new team logos/uniforms, and were open to relocation. Talks regarding funding for a new stadium to replace aging Tampa Stadium had stalled in the spring of 1996. Candidate cities for relocation included Cleveland, Los Angeles, or the nearby city of Orlando. On September 3, 1996, a ballot measure passed, which approved funding for a new stadium. The team was guaranteed to stay in Tampa, and the stadium would open in 1998.

Rule changes earlier in the decade brought about a salary cap, and a minimum spending cap forced Buccaneers to spend more on players. With the new ownership, tax disclosures showed the old Culverhouse regime was running a "for-profit" business in which players who were getting good were released before their contracts could get big, all the while claiming poor and trying to get some home games played in Orlando.

=== NFL draft ===
Prior to the 1996 season the team drafted fullback Mike Alstott, who became one of the most popular players in the team's history, as well as cornerback Donnie Abraham. Although Alstott would become one of the Buccaneers’ most popular players of all time, the organization did not target him in the draft: the team had originally wanted tailback Leeland McElroy, who would be taken before the Bucs drafted.

= Pro Bowler (Note: Players are identified as a Pro Bowler if they were selected for the Pro-Bowl at any time in their career.)

Pick	Round	Player	Position	School
12	1	Regan Upshaw	Defensive End	California
22	1	Marcus Jones	Defensive End	North Carolina
35	2	Mike Alstott	Fullback	Purdue
71	3	Donnie Abraham	Cornerback	East Tennessee State University
96	4	Jason Odom	Offensive Tackle	Florida
104	4	Eric Austin	Strong Safety	Jackson State
140	5	Jason Maniecki	Defensive Tackle	Wisconsin
180	6	Nilo Silvan	Wide Receiver	Tennessee
221	7	Reggie Rusk	Cornerback	Kentucky

=== Undrafted free agents ===
1996 Undrafted free agents of note
Player	Position	College
Scott Milanovich	Quarterback	Maryland

== Season summary ==
Despite having been 7–7 toward the end of 1995, the 1996 team went 0–5 before getting their first win over Tony Dungy's former team, the Minnesota Vikings. The 24–13 win over Minnesota started another streak few noted at the time, in which the team held opponents to 13 points or less in four consecutive games. Despite this, the Oakland Raiders came to Tampa Bay in Week Eleven facing a 1–8 Buccaneers team. Tampa Bay defeated Oakland 20–17 in overtime, which was the first of five wins over the next seven games.

The following week, Tampa Bay traveled to the west coast, where they historically had trouble winning. Playing an interconference game at San Diego, Tampa Bay quickly found themselves down 14–0. The morning of the game, Warren Sapp and Derrick Brooks were in their hotel room watching ESPN's Sunday NFL Countdown. Chris Berman referred to the game as the "Superchargers" versus the "Yucs" – a derogatory nickname that had stemmed from the Bucs' many years of futility. Sapp and Brooks finally took exception to the ridicule they were being subjected to. Tampa Bay would rally in the game with a 25–3 run and won by the score of 25–17. Tampa Bay would win two of the next three, including an emotional win over Chicago 34–19 in which the Bucs returned a punt for a touchdown.

Many fans took encouragement from the team going 5–2 in the final seven games, as well as the emergence of defensive tackle Warren Sapp who had nine sacks on the season, linebacker Derrick Brooks, and fullback Mike Alstott, who along with safety John Lynch and linebacker Hardy Nickerson, were forming the core of what would prove to be a dominant defense.

The offense struggled all season, and was not helped by an ill-advised holdout by running back Errict Rhett, who would have far fewer carries the following year. (Note: The bulk of Tampa Bay's carries in 1997 would be handled by Mike Alstott and Warrick Dunn.) (Note: Rhett would have only 31 carries for 96 yards for Tampa in 1997.)

== Personnel ==
1996 Tampa Bay Buccaneers staff
Front office: Owner/president – Malcolm Glazer; General manager – Rich McKay; Director of player personnel – Jerry Angelo; Director of college scouting – Tim Ruskell; Head coaches: Head coach – Tony Dungy; Assistant head coach/defensive backs – Herman Edwards; Offensive coaches: Offensive coordinator – Mike Shula; Running backs – Tony Nathan; Wide receivers – Charlie Williams; Tight ends – Clyde Christensen; Offensive line – Chris Foerster; Offensive assistant – Ricky Porter	Defensive coaches: Defensive coordinator – Monte Kiffin; Defensive line – Rod Marinelli; Linebackers – Lovie Smith; Defensive assistant – Kevin O'Dea; Special teams coaches: Special teams – Joe Marciano; Strength and conditioning: Strength and conditioning – Mark Asanovich; Strength and conditioning assistant – Aaron Komarek

== Roster ==
1996 Tampa Bay Buccaneers roster
Quarterbacks (QB): 12 Trent Dilfer; 13 Scott Milanovich; 11 Casey Weldon; Running backs (RB): 40 Mike Alstott FB; 41 Reggie Brooks; 37 Jerry Ellison; 32 Errict Rhett; 33 Robert Staten; Wide receivers (WR): 80 Alvin Harper; 85 Courtney Hawkins; 1 Marvin Marshall; 87 Nilo Silvan; 84 Robb Thomas; 86 Karl Williams; Tight ends (TE): 81 Jackie Harris; 83 Dave Moore LS; 82 Willy Tate	Offensive linemen (OL): 62 Ian Beckles G; 68 Joel Crisman G; 64 Jorge Diaz G; 65 Kevin Dogins C; 74 Paul Gruber T; 67 Steve Ingram G/T; 61 Tony Mayberry C; 70 Jason Odom T; 69 Pete Pierson T; Defensive linemen (DL): 72 Chidi Ahanotu DE; 77 Brad Culpepper DT; 75 Eric Curry DE; 97 Tyoka Jackson DT; 78 Marcus Jones DE; 90 Jason Maniecki DT; 99 Warren Sapp DT; 91 Regan Upshaw DE; 94 Steve White DE	Linebackers (LB): 55 Derrick Brooks OLB; 93 Demetrius DuBose MLB; 57 LaCurtis Jones OLB; 51 Lonnie Marts OLB; 56 Hardy Nickerson MLB; 58 Mark Williams OLB; Defensive backs (DB): 21 Donnie Abraham CB; 27 Eric Austin SS; 23 Tony Bouie FS; 39 Charles Dimry CB; 29 Kenneth Gant SS; 25 Melvin Johnson FS; 43 Tyrone Legette CB; 47 John Lynch SS; 35 Martin Mayhew CB; 22 Charles Mincy FS; Special teams (ST): 6 Tommy Barnhardt P; 5 Michael Husted K	Practice squad: 30 Charles Anthony CB; 95 Emil Ekiyor DE; 24 Rashid Gayle CB; 19 Brice Hunter WR; 28 Reggie Rusk CB; Reserve: 88 Horace Copeland WR (IR); 50 Jeff Gooch LB (IR); 60 Jim Pyne G (IR); 79 Doug Riesenberg T (IR); 52 Wardell Rouse LB (IR); 38 Todd Scott S (IR); 53 active, 6 inactive, 5 practice squad Rookies in italics

== Regular season ==
=== Schedule ===
Regular season
Week	Date	Opponent	Result	Game site	Attendance	Record
1	September 1	**Green Bay Packers**	**L** 3–34	Houlihan's Stadium	54,102 (Note: blacked out locally)	0–1
2	September 8	at **Detroit Lions**	**L** 6–21	Pontiac Silverdome	54,229	0–2
3	September 15	at Denver Broncos	**L** 23–27	Mile High Stadium	71,535	0–3
4	September 22	Seattle Seahawks	**L** 13–17	Houlihan's Stadium	30,212	0–4
5	September 29	**Detroit Lions**	**L** 0–27	Houlihan's Stadium	34,961	0–5
6	Bye					
7	October 13	**Minnesota Vikings**	**W** 24–13	Houlihan's Stadium	32,175	1–5
8	October 20	at Arizona Cardinals	**L** 9–13	Sun Devil Stadium	27,738	1–6
9	October 27	at **Green Bay Packers**	**L** 7–13	Lambeau Field	60,627	1–7
10	November 3	at **Chicago Bears**	**L** 10–13	Soldier Field	58,727	1–8
11	November 10	Oakland Raiders	**W** 20–17(OT)	Houlihan's Stadium	45,392	2–8
12	November 17	at San Diego Chargers	**W** 25–17	Jack Murphy Stadium	57,526	3–8
13	November 24	New Orleans Saints	**W** 13–7	Houlihan's Stadium	40,203	4–8
14	December 1	at Carolina Panthers	**L** 0–24	Ericsson Stadium	57,623	4–9
15	December 8	Washington Redskins	**W** 24–10	Houlihan's Stadium	44,723	5–9
16	December 15	at **Minnesota Vikings**	**L** 10–21	Hubert H. Humphrey Metrodome	49,302	5–10
17	December 22	**Chicago Bears**	**W** 34–19	Houlihan's Stadium	51,572	6–10
Notes: Division opponents in **bold** text

=== Standings ===
NFC Central
	W	L	T	PCT	PF	PA	STK
^{(1)} Green Bay Packers	13	3	0	.813	456	210	W5
^{(6)} Minnesota Vikings	9	7	0	.563	298	315	L1
Chicago Bears	7	9	0	.438	283	305	L1
Tampa Bay Buccaneers	6	10	0	.375	221	293	W1
Detroit Lions	5	11	0	.313	302	368	L5
