= 1995 Tampa Bay Buccaneers season =

NFL team season

- Owner: Malcolm Glazer
- General manager: Rich McKay
- Head coach: Sam Wyche
- Home stadium: Tampa Stadium

Results
- Record: 7–9
- Division place: 5th NFC Central
- Playoffs: Did not qualify
- Team MVP: MLB Hardy Nickerson

The 1995 Tampa Bay Buccaneers season was the franchise's 20th season in the National Football League (NFL).

The season began with the team trying to improve on a 6–10 season in 1994, a season in which the team won 4 straight games at the end of the year, and four of their final five. They did so by one game, finishing 7-9 and recording their most wins since going 9-7 in 1981; it was also the first time that they had not lost ten or more games in a full season since then. However, the improvement was not enough for Sam Wyche, the team's head coach, to keep his job; he was fired at the end of the year after four seasons.

This was the first season that the Buccaneers were under the ownership of the Glazer family; Malcolm Glazer purchased the team in January from the estate of Hugh Culverhouse, the team's founder.

== Overview ==
There had been rumors as far back as the end of the 1993 season that ownership would move the team after funding to improve Tampa Stadium was not obtained, but a referendum kept the Bucs in Tampa for 1995. The possibility of moving the Buccaneers to Cleveland, Ohio was an undercurrent throughout the 1995 season once Art Modell’s relocation of the Browns to Baltimore was announced.

The Buccaneers selected two future Hall of Famers in the draft. With their first selection at number twelve, they selected Miami defensive tackle Warren Sapp. Then, they traded two second round picks to the Dallas Cowboys for pick number twenty-eight, with which they selected Florida State linebacker Derrick Brooks. In addition to this, the Pro Football Hall of Fame enshrined former Buccaneer Lee Roy Selmon into its ranks.

Bucs’ head coach Sam Wyche gained some notoriety for saying "Five dash Two" to reporters during a press conference after the seventh game of the season, referring to the team's 5–2 record at the time. Tampa Bay had won 9 of its previous 12 games, going back to the end of the 1994 season, and many observers felt they had become a sleeper NFC playoff contender. However, the good luck and victory string soon ran out, and the team would go 2–7 for the remainder of the season.

Following the week seven overtime win over Minnesota, Tampa Bay lost three in a row before beating expansion Jacksonville, only after Jaguars coach Tom Coughlin decided to go for a 2-point conversion when scoring a last-minute touchdown. It failed and the Bucs won 17–16, giving them a sweep of that season's new expansion teams, as they had beaten Carolina 17–10 in week 5. Two more losses followed, and the 6–7 Buccaneers had a prime time ESPN Sunday Night Football game against the Green Bay Packers, who were playing without future Hall of Fame defensive end Reggie White due to injury. Tampa Bay pulled out an overtime win over the eventual NFC Central champion Packers to make their record 7–7, ensuring that their streak of 10-loss seasons—dating back to the 1983 season—would end. The Buccaneers had remained in playoff contention through fourteen games for the first time in a 16-game season since 1981, when they won their second division championship in three seasons under coach John McKay and quarterback Doug Williams. (the Buccaneers qualified for the expanded playoff tournament during the strike-shortened 1982 season, their last postseason appearance until 1997).

The Bucs, however, lost to the Chicago Bears by 21 points at Soldier Field in the penultimate game of the season, ending their playoff hopes. In the season finale at home against a surging Detroit Lions team who were riding a six-game winning streak, Tampa lost decisively in a nationally televised Saturday game. The game became infamous due to a sideline argument between Wyche and quarterback Trent Dilfer; it was later revealed that Wyche planned to pull Dilfer for young backup quarterback Casey Weldon regardless of how the game was going, triggering Dilfer's furious reaction and also angering teammates of the very respected if inconsistent starter. The Buccaneers' overall passing attack in 1995 was anemic: they passed for the fifth-fewest yards in the league, had the second-worst team passer rating (60.3), and set an NFL record for fewest team touchdown passes (5) in a 16-game season, and didn't have a single passing touchdown for the months of October and November.

Rumors also swirled that Wyche, knowing he would be let go by new owners without a winning record after a 5–2 start, ordered the team to wear orange jerseys and orange pants for the season finale (which at the time, would have been a first to wear the same colored top and bottom other than white), but after several players refused to wear it, the idea was scrapped. At another point, Wyche even played a prank on his team, inviting Fox analyst Jimmy Johnson to barge in on a team meeting and pretend that he was taking over as the new head coach. At the time, Johnson was interested in getting back into coaching, with Tampa Bay rumored as a possible destination. With Wyche knowing he was on the "hot seat", he took advantage of Johnson being in town that day (to tape an interview for that Sunday's Fox NFL Sunday program) to conduct the ruse, and lighten the mood in the locker room.

New owner Malcolm Glazer decided Wyche's tenure as coach was done, and started the search for the next coach of the Buccaneers, a search that would bring in coach Tony Dungy, who would turn the Buccaneers into a perennial playoff team (a 54–42 record and four playoff appearances in six seasons with the Tampa Bay), and build the foundation for their first Super Bowl win in 2002.

== Offseason ==
=== NFL draft ===
Pick	Round	Player	Position	School
12	1	Warren Sapp	Defensive Tackle	Miami
28	1	Derrick Brooks	Linebacker	Florida State
43	2	Melvin Johnson	Safety	Kentucky
105	4	Jerry Wilson	Safety	Saginaw Valley State
143	5	Clifton Abraham	Cornerback	Florida State
179	6	Wardell Rouse	Linebacker	Clemson
215	7	Steve Ingram	Offensive Tackle	Maryland
227	7	Jeff Rodgers	Defensive End	Texas A&I

=== Transactions ===
- July 27: Tampa Bay signed linebacker Tommy Thigpen

== Personnel ==
=== Staff ===
1995 Tampa Bay Buccaneers staff
Front office: Owner/president – Malcolm Glazer; General manager – Rich McKay; Director of player personnel – Jerry Angelo; Director of college scouting – Tim Ruskell; Head coaches: Head coach/director of football operations – Sam Wyche; Offensive coaches: Quarterbacks – Turk Schonert; Running backs – Kippy Brown; Wide receivers – David Culley; Tight ends – Mike Mularkey; Offensive line – Bob Wylie	Defensive coaches: Defensive coordinator – Rusty Tillman; Defensive line – Ken Clarke; Defensive line – Tom Pratt; Linebackers – Maxie Baughan; Defensive backs – Johnnie Lynn; Special teams coaches: Special teams – George Stewart; Strength and conditioning: Strength and conditioning – Brad Roll

=== Roster ===
1995 Tampa Bay Buccaneers roster
Quarterbacks (QB): 12 Trent Dilfer; 15 Todd Philcox; 11 Casey Weldon; Running backs (RB): 41 Bobby Joe Edmonds; 37 Jerry Ellison; 30 Fred Lester; 32 Errict Rhett; Wide receivers (WR): 88 Horace Copeland; 80 Lawrence Dawsey; 82 Alvin Harper; 85 Courtney Hawkins; 89 Marvin Marshall; 87 Lamar Thomas; Tight ends (TE): 86 Tyji Armstrong; 81 Jackie Harris; 83 Dave Moore; 49 Cedric Saunders	Offensive linemen (OL): 62 Ian Beckles G; 76 Scott Dill T; 74 Paul Gruber T; 65 Steve Ingram T; 61 Tony Mayberry C; 70 Charles McRae G; 69 Pete Pierson T; 60 Jim Pyne G; 67 Mike Sullivan C/G; Defensive linemen (DL): 72 Chidi Ahanotu DE; 73 Brad Culpepper DT; 75 Eric Curry DE; 71 Santana Dotson DT; 99 Warren Sapp DT; 91 Herman Smith DE; 77 Mark Wheeler DT	Linebackers (LB): 55 Derrick Brooks OLB; 93 Demetrius DuBose OLB; 51 Lonnie Marts OLB; 56 Hardy Nickerson MLB; 52 Wardell Rouse OLB; 54 Darnell Stephens MLB; Defensive backs (DB): 26 Clifton Abraham CB; 23 Tony Bouie SS; 28 Curtis Buckley CB; 39 Charles Dimry CB; 22 Thomas Everett FS; 29 Kenneth Gant SS; 25 Melvin Johnson FS; 35 Martin Mayhew CB; 21 Mike McGruder CB; 38 Todd Scott SS; 45 Tony Stargell CB; Special teams (ST): 53 Ed Brady LS; 5 Michael Husted K; 1 Reggie Roby P	Practice squad: 68 Joel Crisman G; 10 Kelly Holcomb QB; 33 Tiger McMillon RB; 57 Kerry Mock LB; Reserve: 44 John Booty S (IR); 27 Barney Bussey S (IR); 47 John Lynch S (IR); 95 Keith Powe DE (IR); 24 Jerry Wilson S (IR); Rookies in italics 53 active, 5 reserve, 4 practice squad

== Regular season ==
=== Schedule ===
Week	Date	Opponent	Result	Record	Venue	Attendance
1	September 3	at Philadelphia Eagles	**W** 21–6	1–0	Veterans Stadium	66,266
2	September 10	at Cleveland Browns	**L** 6–22	1–1	Cleveland Stadium	61,083
3	September 17	**Chicago Bears**	**L** 6–25	1–2	Tampa Stadium	71,507
4	September 24	Washington Redskins	**W** 14–6	2–2	Tampa Stadium	49,234 (Note: blacked out locally)
5	October 1	at Carolina Panthers	**W** 20–13	3–2	Memorial Stadium	50,076
6	October 8	Cincinnati Bengals	W 19–16	4–2	Tampa Stadium	41,732
7	October 15	**Minnesota Vikings**	**W** 20–17 (OT)	5–2	Tampa Stadium	55,703
8	October 22	Atlanta Falcons	**L** 21–24	5–3	Tampa Stadium	66,135
9	October 29	at Houston Oilers	**L** 7–19	5–4	Astrodome	31,489
10	Bye					
11	November 12	at **Detroit Lions**	**L** 24–27	5–5	Pontiac Silverdome	60,644
12	November 19	Jacksonville Jaguars	**W** 17–16	6–5	Tampa Stadium	71,629
13	November 26	at **Green Bay Packers**	**L** 13–35	6–6	Lambeau Field	59,218
14	December 3	at **Minnesota Vikings**	**L** 17–31	6–7	Hubert H. Humphrey Metrodome	52,879
15	December 10	**Green Bay Packers**	**W** 13–10 (OT)	7–7	Tampa Stadium	67,557
16	December 17	at **Chicago Bears**	**L** 10–31	7–8	Soldier Field	49,475
17	December 23	**Detroit Lions**	**L** 10–37	7–9	Tampa Stadium	50,049
Notes: Division opponents in **bold** text

=== Standings ===
NFC Central
	W	L	T	PCT	PF	PA	STK
^{(3)} Green Bay Packers	11	5	0	.688	404	314	W2
^{(5)} Detroit Lions	10	6	0	.625	436	336	W7
Chicago Bears	9	7	0	.563	392	360	W2
Minnesota Vikings	8	8	0	.500	412	385	L2
Tampa Bay Buccaneers	7	9	0	.438	238	335	L2
