= 1994 Tampa Bay Buccaneers season =

NFL team season

- Owner: the Hugh Culverhouse estate
- General manager: Rich McKay
- Head coach: Sam Wyche
- Home stadium: Tampa Stadium

Results
- Record: 6–10
- Division place: 5th NFC Central
- Playoffs: Did not qualify
- Team MVP: LT Paul Gruber

The 1994 Tampa Bay Buccaneers season was the franchise's 19th season in the National Football League (NFL). The year began with the death of owner Hugh Culverhouse. Ownership was transferred to a three-man board of trustees. Season ticket sales dwindled, and rumors of the team's location were a persistent distraction all year. At mid-season, the new ownership removed all personnel responsibilities from coach Sam Wyche, and gave them to Vice President Rich McKay, who they named general manager. They also put the team up for sale. On the field, Errict Rhett became the first rookie in the team's history to rush for 1,000 yards, despite not starting until the ninth game of the season.

The Buccaneers had one of the weakest offenses in the league, even while led by a coach who had consistently produced top offenses while with the Cincinnati Bengals. At 2–9, most people in the Bay area were ready to hang Wyche and pack his bags, but the defensive line improved as Eric Curry finally matured in the second half of the season, and the Bucs began their first 4-game winning streak in 15 years. It started with an overtime win against the Minnesota Vikings. Two wins over the Washington Redskins and one over the Los Angeles Rams set up a big game in Tampa against the Green Bay Packers, who were trying to secure a playoff spot. "We've arrived", Wyche announced prematurely. The final game was called "Orange Pride Day", and was attended by 65,000 fans (although many were rooting for the visitors), most of whom expected it to be the last football game in Tampa. The Packers won, 34–19.

== Offseason ==
=== NFL draft ===
Pick	Round	Player	Position	School
6	1	Trent Dilfer	Quarterback	Fresno State
34	2	Errict Rhett	Running back	Florida
69	3	Harold Bishop	Tight end	LSU
136	5	Pete Pierson	Offensive tackle	Washington
165	6	Bernard Carter	Linebacker	East Carolina
200	7	Jim Pyne	Center	Virginia Tech

== Preseason ==
The Tampa Bay Buccaneers went 2–2 in the pre-season, winning their first game against the Bengals at home. After a loss to Seattle Seahawks on the road, the Bucs beat cross state rival Miami Dolphins in game three. The last game of the preseason was lost to the New York Jets by one point. Expectations were for a break even season in 1994.

== Personnel ==
=== Staff ===
1994 Tampa Bay Buccaneers staff
Front office: Vice president of football administration – Rich McKay; Director of player personnel – Jerry Angelo; Director of college scouting – Tim Ruskell; Head coaches: Head coach/director of football operations – Sam Wyche; Offensive coaches: Quarterbacks – Turk Schonert; Running backs – Willie Peete; Wide receivers – David Culley; Offensive line – Bob Wylie; Quality control – Mike Mularkey	Defensive coaches: Defensive coordinator – Floyd Peters; Defensive line – Ken Clarke; Linebackers – Maxie Baughan; Defensive backs – Johnnie Lynn; Special teams coaches: Special teams/tight ends – George Stewart; Strength and conditioning: Strength and conditioning – Brad Roll

=== Roster ===
1994 Tampa Bay Buccaneers roster
Quarterbacks (QB): 12 Trent Dilfer; 7 Craig Erickson; 11 Casey Weldon; Running backs (RB): 43 Rudy Harris; 33 Anthony McDowell FB; 32 Errict Rhett; 31 Mazio Royster; 30 Vernon Turner; 46 Vince Workman; Wide receivers (WR): 88 Horace Copeland; 82 Tyree Davis; 80 Lawrence Dawsey; 84 Charles Wilson; 87 Lamar Thomas; Tight ends (TE): 86 Tyji Armstrong; 89 Harold Bishop; 83 Dave Moore	Offensive linemen (OL): 62 Ian Beckles G; 76 Scott Dill T/G; 74 Paul Gruber T; 79 Sean Love G; 61 Tony Mayberry C; 70 Charles McRae G/T; 69 Pete Pierson T; 60 Jim Pyne G; 67 Mike Sullivan T; Defensive linemen (DL): 72 Chidi Ahanotu DE; 73 Brad Culpepper DT; 75 Eric Curry DE; 71 Santana Dotson DT; 90 Milton Jones DE; 94 Toddrick McIntosh DE; 95 Keith Powe DE; 92 Shawn Price DT; 77 Mark Wheeler DT; 91 Karl Wilson DE	Linebackers (LB): 57 Jeff Brady MLB; 27 Barney Bussey OLB; 93 Demetrius DuBose OLB; 55 Lonnie Marts OLB; 56 Hardy Nickerson MLB; Defensive backs (DB): 28 Curtis Buckley CB; 23 Marty Carter FS; 25 Tony Covington SS; 39 Charles Dimry CB; 22 Thomas Everett FS; 26 Rogerick Green CB; 47 John Lynch FS; 35 Martin Mayhew CB; 38 Mike McGruder CB; Special teams (ST): 53 Ed Brady LS; 5 Michael Husted K; 4 Dan Stryzinski P	Practice squad: 68 Joel Crisman G; 37 Jerry Ellison RB; 42 Vidal Mills S; Reserve: 81 Jackie Harris TE (IR); 85 Courtney Hawkins WR (IR); 45 Tony Stargell CB (IR); 53 active, 3 inactive, 3 practice squad Rookies in italics

== Regular season ==
=== Schedule ===
Regular season
Week	Date	Opponent	Result	Game site	Attendance	Record
1	September 4	at **Chicago Bears**	**L** 21–9	Soldier Field	61,844	0–1
2	September 11	Indianapolis Colts	**W** 24–10	Tampa Stadium	36,631 (Note: blacked out locally)	1–1
3	September 18	New Orleans Saints	**L** 9–7	Tampa Stadium	45,522	1–2
4	September 25	at **Green Bay Packers**	**L** 30–3	Lambeau Field	58,551	1–3
5	October 2	**Detroit Lions**	**W** 24–14	Tampa Stadium	38,012	2–3
6	October 9	at Atlanta Falcons	**L** 34–13	Georgia Dome	52,633	2–4
7	Bye					
8	October 23	at San Francisco 49ers	**L** 41–16	Candlestick Park	62,741	2–5
9	October 30	**Minnesota Vikings**	**L** 36–13	Tampa Stadium	42,110	2–6
10	November 6	**Chicago Bears**	**L** 20–6	Tampa Stadium	60,821	2–7
11	November 13	at **Detroit Lions**	**L** 14–9	Pontiac Silverdome	50,814	2–8
12	November 20	at Seattle Seahawks	**L** 22–21	Kingdome	37,466	2–9
13	November 27	at **Minnesota Vikings**	**W** 20–17 (OT)	Hubert H. Humphrey Metrodome	47,259	3–9
14	December 4	Washington Redskins	**W** 26–21	Tampa Stadium	45,121	4–9
15	December 11	Los Angeles Rams	**W** 24–14	Tampa Stadium	34,150	5–9
16	December 18	at Washington Redskins	**W** 17–14	RFK Stadium	47,315	6–9
17	December 24	**Green Bay Packers**	**L** 34–19	Tampa Stadium	65,076	6–10
Note: Division opponents in **bold** text

=== Standings ===
NFC Central
	W	L	T	PCT	PF	PA	STK
^{(3)} Minnesota Vikings	10	6	0	.625	356	314	W1
^{(4)} Green Bay Packers	9	7	0	.563	382	287	W3
^{(5)} Detroit Lions	9	7	0	.563	357	342	L1
^{(6)} Chicago Bears	9	7	0	.563	271	307	L1
Tampa Bay Buccaneers	6	10	0	.375	251	351	L1

== Season summary ==
=== Week 13 at Vikings ===
Week Thirteen: Tampa Bay Buccaneers (2–9) at Minnesota Vikings (7–4)

Quarter	1	2	3	4	OT	Total
Buccaneers	7	7	0	3	3	20
Vikings	0	9	0	8	0	17

at Hubert H. Humphrey Metrodome, Minneapolis, Minnesota

- Date: November 27, 1994
- Game time: 1:00 p.m. EDT
- Game weather: Indoors (dome)
- Game attendance: 47,250
- TV: FOX
- Box Score, Box Score

Team	Category	Player	Statistics
Buccaneers	Passing	Craig Erickson	20/38, 254 Yds, TD, INT
Buccaneers	Rushing	Errict Rhett	24 Rush, 55 Yds, TD
Buccaneers	Receiving	Courtney Hawkins	6 Rec, 80 Yds, TD
Vikings	Passing	Warren Moon	24/46, 286 Yds, TD, INT
Vikings	Rushing	Terry Allen	16 Rush, 54 Yds
Vikings	Receiving	Qadry Ismail	6 Rec, 101 Yds, TD

Scoring summary

Quarter	Time	Drive			Team	Scoring information	Score	
Quarter	Time	Plays	Yards	TOP	Team	Scoring information	TB	MIN
1	11:14	3	6		Buccaneers	Errict Rhett 1-yard touchdown run, Michael Husted kick good	7	0
2	13:36	12	61		Vikings	23-yard field goal by Fuad Reveiz	7	3
2	8:16	9	49		Vikings	21-yard field goal by Fuad Reveiz	7	6
2	5:13	8	55		Buccaneers	Courtney Hawkins 14-yard touchdown reception from Craig Erickson, Michael Husted kick good	14	6
2	0:33	10	53		Vikings	51-yard field goal by Fuad Reveiz	14	9
3	5:24	14	86		Buccaneers	-yard field goal by Michael Husted	17	9
4	2:27	3	52		Vikings	Qadry Ismail 40-yard touchdown reception from Warren Moon, 2-point pass good	17	17
OT	12:52	1	0		Buccaneers	22-yard field goal by Michael Husted	20	17
"TOP" = time of possession. For other American football terms, see Glossary of American football.							20	17
