= Dave Moore (tight end) =

American football player (born 1969)

No. 46, 83, 86
- Position: Long snapper

Personal information
- Born: November 11, 1969 (age 56); Morristown, New Jersey, U.S.
- Listed height: 6 ft 2 in (1.88 m)
- Listed weight: 250 lb (113 kg)

Career information
- High school: Roxbury (Succasunna, New Jersey)
- College: Pittsburgh (1988–1991)
- NFL draft: 1992: 7th round, 191st overall pick

Career history
- Miami Dolphins (1992); Tampa Bay Buccaneers (1992–2001); Buffalo Bills (2002–2003); Tampa Bay Buccaneers (2004–2006)

Awards and highlights
- Pro Bowl (2006); Second-team All-East (1991)

Career NFL statistics
- Receptions: 207
- Receiving yards: 2,028
- Receiving touchdowns: 28
- Stats at Pro Football Reference

David Edward Moore (born November 11, 1969) is an American former professional football player who was a long snapper for 15 seasons in the National Football League (NFL) for the Miami Dolphins, Buffalo Bills, and Tampa Bay Buccaneers. He played college football for the Pittsburgh Panthers.

Moore's last official NFL game was the 2007 Pro Bowl in Honolulu, Hawaii. He didn't miss more than two games in any season for his entire Buccaneers career since first joining the team in 1993. At the time of his retirement, he was the fourth tight end in NFL history to play 200 career games. In fact, before him, only 206 NFL players had accomplished this feat in the entirety of the National Football League's existence. During his career he had a rate of one touchdown scored for every 7.7 passes caught, which was the best touchdown rate by any player in Buccaneers history who had at least 50 career receptions.

== Early life ==
Moore attended Roxbury High School in Succasunna, New Jersey, and was a letterman in football, basketball, baseball, and track. He led the Roxbury Gaels to back to back state finals appearances in 1986 and 1987. Moore was selected as both a New Jersey All-State player, as well as an All Tri-State Player which consists of the states of Connecticut, New Jersey, and New York.

== College career ==
Moore played college football at the University of Pittsburgh for the Pittsburgh Panthers. He attended from 1988 to 1991, and recorded his best collegiate season in 1991 with 51 receptions, leading the Big East Conference for receptions by a tight end. Following his successful career at The University of Pittsburgh, he received an invite to the NFL Combine.

== College statistics ==
Rushing

Year	School	Games	Rushing Attempts	Yards	Yards per Rush	Touchdowns
1988	PITT	6	15	46	3.1	0
1989	PITT	10	2	5	2.5	0

Receiving

Year	School	Games	Receptions	Yards	Yards Per Reception	Touchdowns
1989	PITT	10	6	119	19.8	1
1990	PITT	11	32	399	12.5	3
1991	PITT	11	51	505	9.9	1

== Professional career ==
=== Miami Dolphins ===
Moore was selected by the Miami Dolphins in the seventh round of the 1992 NFL Draft. He appeared in one game for the Miami Dolphins during his rookie season. He was the last active player to appear on the field with Dan Marino.

=== Tampa Bay Buccaneers (first stint) ===
Moore signed with the Tampa Bay Buccaneers in 1992. He joined George Stewart's tight end room and appeared in four total games that season, resulting in one reception for ten yards.

Moore appeared in 15 games for the Buccaneers in 1993. He totaled four receptions on the year for 47 receiving yards and scored his first professional touchdown against the Denver Broncos.

Moore again appeared in 15 games during the 1994 season for the Buccaneers. He totaled four receptions for 57 receiving yards this year. He missed one game in 1994 due to an ankle sprain. Moore would go on to appear in 119 consecutive games after this injury, earning him a reputation among the coaching staff as being extremely durable. Moore also began to be regarded as a great blocker this season.

In 1995, Moore appeared in all 16 games for the first time in his career. He became more involved in the offensive passing game, more than tripling his receptions from the year before and totaling 13 receptions for 102 yards.

This was Tony Dungy's first season as head coach for the Buccaneers. Before Dungy's arrival, Moore was used as a fullback in the Buccaneers offense. During the 1995 offseason, the Buccaneers selected Mike Alstott in the second round of the NFL draft. Dungy moved Moore to tight end to begin the season. With team starter Jackie Harris struggling with injuries, Moore started eight games this season. In his first season at tight end, Moore totaled 27 receptions for 237 yards and 3 touchdowns. His longest reception was for 23 yards.

Moore scored the first touchdown of the year for the Buccaneers. His touchdown helped the Buccaneers take the lead in the fourth quarter against the San Francisco 49ers. The Buccaneers went on to qualify for the playoffs in the 1997 post-season.

In 1998, the Buccaneers faced the Chicago Bears at home. During the third quarter, Moore secured a 45-yard one handed catch, thrown by Trent Dilfer, to score the first touchdown by a Buccaneer in the newly built Raymond James Stadium. According to Bucs Report, this catch is often accredited as one of the best catches in Buccaneer History. This catch sparked a fourth quarter comeback by the Buccaneers and resulted in the team's first ever win in Raymond James Stadium.

For the 1999 season, Moore amassed 276 receiving yards and 23 receptions and 5 touchdowns this season, the most touchdowns he would score in a single NFL season. Over his entire career he had a rate of one touchdown scored for every 7.7 passes caught, which was the best touchdown rate by any player in Buccaneer history who had at least 50 career receptions. He helped contribute to the Buccaneers NFC Championship appearance against the St. Louis Rams. The Buccaneers were defeated 11–6.

Entering the 21st century, Moore continued the trend of increasing his receptions and receiving yards from the year before. During this season, he totaled 29 receptions for 288 receiving yards. His 29 receptions ranked seventh among National Football Conference (NFC) tight ends. His 3 touchdown catches were the third most on the team.

Moore had a career year for receptions in 2001. He amassed 35 receptions this year for a total of 285 yards. He averaged 8.1 yards per reception and scored 4 touchdowns. However, Moore was released by the Buccaneers following his career year. According to the Tampa Bay Times, Jon Gruden wanted to keep Moore in Tampa and planned to use him as a key part of his offense. However, Buccaneers general manager, Rich McKay didn't offer a contract above the veteran minimum salary of $650,000. Moore was courted by multiple teams in the off season, including the Buffalo Bills and the Pittsburgh Steelers. Considering that he was both a great blocker and a well-versed receiving threat, he was a great fit for both of their offenses.

=== Buffalo Bills ===
Following a career year with the Buccaneers, Moore signed a three-year $3.8 million deal with a $500,000 signing bonus with the Buffalo Bills. Former Pitt teammates, quarterback Alex Van Pelt and guard Ruben Brown helped recruit Moore to join them in Buffalo. Although Moore suited up for the Buffalo Bills, he continued to keep Tampa Bay as his home and his main residence. In his first season in Buffalo, he caught 16 passes for 141 yards and 2 touchdowns.

In 2003, Moore appeared in 15 total games. He totaled 7 passes for 82 yards. He averaged 11.7 yards per catch and 2 touchdowns.

=== Tampa Bay Buccaneers (second stint) ===
The Buccaneers opened up free agency in 2004 offseason by announcing they had signed Moore to return to the team. In addition to playing tight end for the Buccaneers, he also served as the team's long snapper. As a tight end, Moore hauled in 3 receptions for 17 yards, averaging 5.7 yards per reception.

In 2005, Moore played in his 200th career game against the Washington Redskins. At the time he was just the 207th player in NFL history to accomplish this feat. He is one of only eight NFL tight ends to play 200 games. Moore continued to play both tight end and long snapper for the Buccaneers. He totaled one reception for 5 yards, primarily serving as a blocking tight end for the Buccaneers offense.

In 2006, Moore played his final season. He totaled one reception for 9 yards. In his entire career, Moore caught 207 passes for 2,028 yards and 28 touchdowns. His longest reception was 44 yards in 1998. He averaged 9.8 yards per reception. During his career he had a rate of one touchdown scored for every 7.7 passes caught, which was the best touchdown rate by any player in Buccaneer history who had at least 50 career receptions. Moore was selected to the Pro Bowl at the end of the 2006 season. He retired following the 2006 season, after playing 15 seasons in the National Football League.

== NFL statistics ==
Year	Team	GMS	Recs	Yds	Avg.	Long	TDs	FDs	Fum	Lost
1992	TB	4	1	10	10.0	10	0	1	0	0
1993	TB	15	4	47	11.8	19	1	3	0	0
1994	TB	15	4	57	14.3	18	0	3	0	0
1995	TB	16	13	102	7.8	21	0	5	0	0
1996	TB	16	27	237	8.8	23	3	15	0	0
1997	TB	16	19	217	11.4	28	4	13	0	0
1998	TB	16	24	255	10.6	44	4	13	1	1
1999	TB	16	23	276	12.0	35	5	12	0	0
2000	TB	16	29	288	9.9	28	3	17	0	0
2001	TB	16	35	285	8.1	29	4	18	0	0
2002	BUF	14	16	141	8.8	19	2	8	0	0
2003	BUF	15	7	82	11.7	28	2	4	1	0
2004	TB	15	3	17	5.7	10	0	2	0	0
2005	TB	16	1	5	5.0	5	0	1	0	0
2006	TB	13	1	9	9.0	9	0	0	1	1
Career		219	207	2,028	9.8	44	28	115	3	2

== Buccaneers Radio Network ==
Beginning with the 2007 football season, Moore began working for the Buccaneers Radio Network. He serves as the color analyst (replacing Hardy Nickerson from 2006) and works alongside play-by-play announcer Gene Deckerhoff. Moore was most recently color commentated the Super Bowl in Tampa for Buccaneers Radio Network. His voice has been featured in Super Bowl highlights released by the National Football League of the Buccaneers victory.

== Coaching career ==
Since retiring from the National Football League, Moore has coached throughout the Tampa Bay area. He began his coaching career for a little league team in St. Petersburg, Florida called the Azalea Bulldogs. He then went on to become the Head Varsity Football Coach for Shorecrest Preparatory High School. Moore served as the third Head Coach in the program's history, replacing Pinellas County's longest tenured coach Phil Hayford. Moore led the Shorecrest Chargers to a 7–3 record in 2012. In the first week of the regular season, Moore opened up with a victory over Northside Christian, a team coached by his former Bucs teammate Mike Alstott. Moore stepped down as the head coach of Shorecrest Preporatory and transitioned to an assistant coaching role for Jesuit High School in Tampa, Florida, where he coached his son Jake. Jake played both center and Long Snapper and Jesuit. Jake, following in his father's footsteps, as a football player, was two-year captain of the Jesuit football team, 2x Jesuit Most Valuable Offensive Lineman, received First-team all-area, all county, and all-state honors, played on both conference and regional championship teams, before heading to the Dayton Flyers football team at the University of Dayton

== Post-NFL career ==
Moore hosted a fishing show on SunSports titled One Moore Catch and owns a restaurant "Island Way Grill" in Clearwater, Florida with former teammate Mike Alstott. Moore has a wife, Ann Marie, a daughter, Halee, and a son, Jake. He is an avid fisherman. According to his Twitter account, Moore received a Super Bowl Ring at the Buccaneers' ring ceremony for their 2020 victory.

== Moore Resources Insurance ==
Dave Moore founded Moore Resources Insurance in 2007, and is CEO and President of the company.
