= John Lynch (American football) =

American football player and executive (born 1971)

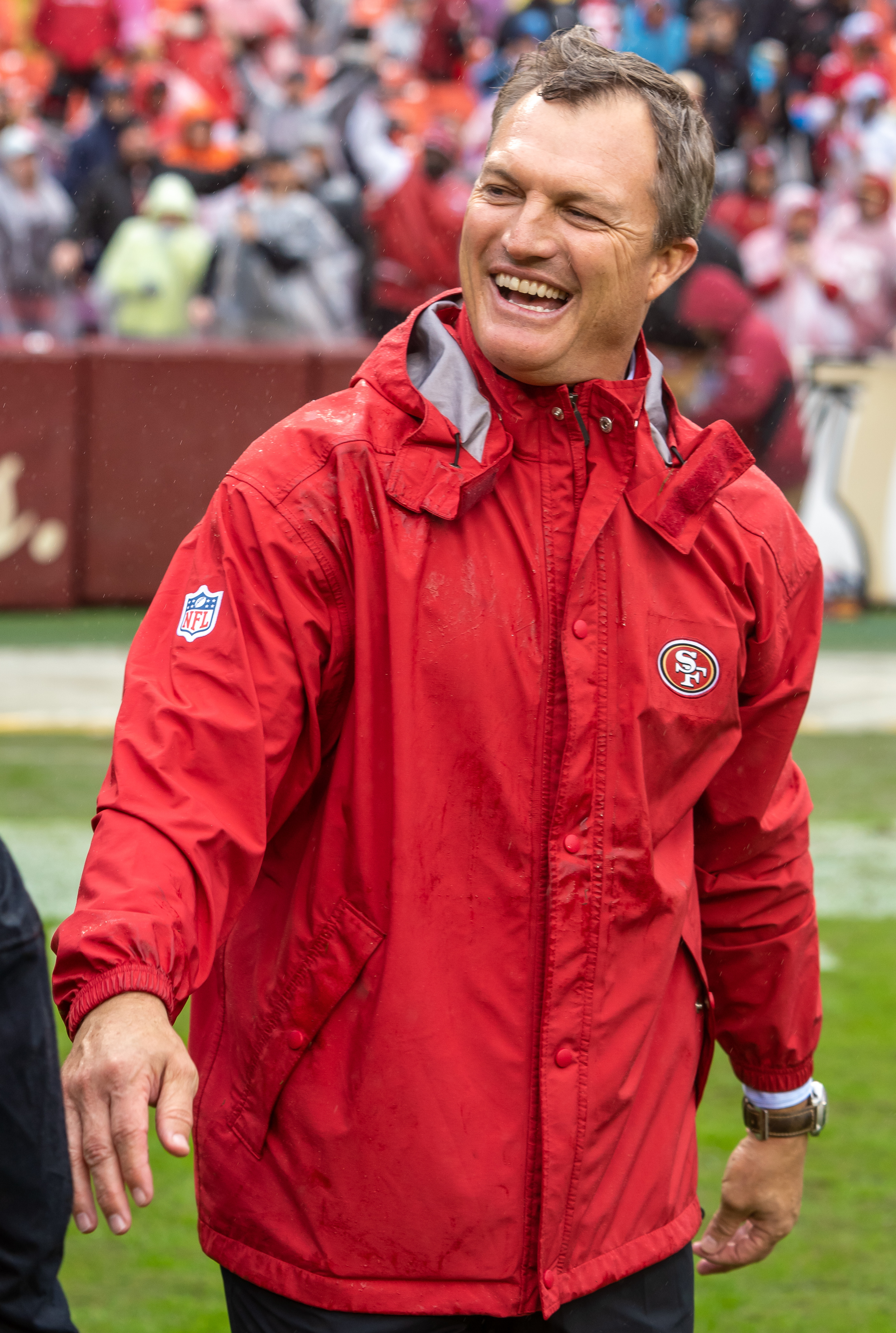
- Lynch in 2019

San Francisco 49ers
- Title: President of football operations & general manager

Personal information
- Born: September 25, 1971 (age 55); Hinsdale, Illinois, U.S.
- Listed height: 6 ft 2 in (1.88 m)
- Listed weight: 220 lb (100 kg)

Career information
- Position: Safety (No. 47)
- High school: Torrey Pines (San Diego, California)
- College: Stanford (1989–1992)
- NFL draft: 1993: 3rd round, 82nd overall pick

Career history

Playing
- Tampa Bay Buccaneers (1993–2003); Denver Broncos (2004–2007); New England Patriots (2008)*
- * Offseason or practice squad member only

Operations
- San Francisco 49ers (2017–2022) General manager; San Francisco 49ers (2023–present) President of football operations/general manager

Awards and highlights
- Playing: Super Bowl champion (XXXVII); 2× First-team All-Pro (1999, 2000); 2× Second-team All-Pro (2001, 2002); 9× Pro Bowl (1997, 1999–2002, 2004–2007); Tampa Bay Buccaneers Ring of Honor; Denver Broncos Ring of Fame; Third-team All-American (1992); First-team All-Pac-10 (1992); Operations: PFWA Executive of the Year (2019)

Career NFL statistics
- Tackles: 1,058
- Sacks: 13
- Interceptions: 26
- Forced fumbles: 16
- Stats at Pro Football Reference
- Executive profile at Pro Football Reference
- Pro Football Hall of Fame

John Terrence Lynch Jr. (born September 25, 1971) is an American professional football executive and former safety who is the general manager of the San Francisco 49ers of the National Football League (NFL). He played college football for the Stanford Cardinal and was selected by the Tampa Bay Buccaneers in the third round of the 1993 NFL draft, later winning Super Bowl XXXVII with them. Lynch also spent four seasons with the Denver Broncos before retiring in 2008 and working as a color commentator for NFL on Fox games until being named general manager of the 49ers in 2017. He made nine Pro Bowls during his career and was inducted into the Pro Football Hall of Fame in 2021.

== Early life ==
Lynch was born in Hinsdale, Illinois. He attended Torrey Pines High School in the Carmel Valley/Del Mar area of San Diego, California, where he played football, baseball, and basketball.

== College career ==
Lynch starred in baseball and football at Stanford University. He began his collegiate football career in 1989 as a quarterback. During fall camp entering his junior season in 1991, Lynch unsuccessfully competed for the starting role at quarterback to returning starter Jason Palumbis. During this time, Lynch was a pitcher for Stanford and was performed fairly well. He considered solely focusing on baseball, but chose to request to transition to a defense. He immediately transitioned to free safety and earned the starting role within a three week time period. After two games, Lynch was benched and began focusing solely on baseball. On January 11, 1992, head coach Dennis Green was hired as the Minnesota Vikings' head coach. On January 17, 1992, Stanford hired Bill Walsh as their new head coach, succeeding Dennis Green.

Upon his arrival, Walsh began evaluating every player on his roster by viewing tapes from the 1991 season. Although there was little footage on Lynch, Walsh was impressed by his athleticism and promptly approached Lynch to ask him to reconsider his decision to quit playing football.

On June 1, 1992, Lynch was solely focused on baseball and did not consider the possibility of ever returning to football after he was selected in the second round (66th overall) of the 1992 Major League Baseball draft as a right-handed pitcher by the Florida Marlins. After speaking with Walsh, Lynch accepted his offer to return. With the confidence of head coach Bill Walsh, Lynch had an impressive senior season as the starting free safety for the Stanford Cardinal where he recorded 76 combined tackles, four interceptions, and returned one for a 62-yard return touchdown. Throughout his one season under head coach Bill Walsh, Lynch quickly impressed teams and became a top safety prospect for the upcoming 1993 NFL Draft. Stanford achieved a 10–3 record in 1992, marking only the second 10-win season in school history, with a final ranking of #9 and win in the Blockbuster Bowl.

== Baseball career ==
Lynch was drafted as a right-handed pitcher by the Florida Marlins in the second round (66th overall) of the 1992 Major League Baseball draft. He threw the first pitch in the organization's history as a member of the Erie Sailors; thus, his jersey with the Sailors is in the Baseball Hall of Fame. Lynch played two seasons in the minor leagues with the Sailors and the Kane County Cougars, starting nine games and going 1–3 with a 2.35 earned run average.

== Football career ==
=== Pre-draft ===
Although Lynch had only played free safety for one full season and 15 games altogether, he performed impressively enough throughout that single season to be considered one of the top safety prospects eligible for the upcoming 1993 NFL Draft. Teams and draft analysts persistently decided his limited experience was the main concern. Teams were also skeptical of his dedication to football and thought his inclusion in the NFL Draft was possibly just a ploy in an attempt to concern the Florida Marlins enough to increase his salary.

This was a recurring theme for top draft prospects that were also successful in baseball and selected in the MLB draft, including players like John Elway, Deion Sanders, and Bo Jackson. The Tampa Bay Buccaneers' owner Hugh Culverhouse vowed to never draft a baseball player again after an alleged scheme angered Bo Jackson enough to refuse to play for them, although they drafted him first overall in 1986.

Pre-draft measurables
Height	Weight	Arm length	Hand span
6 ft 1 1/8 in (1.86 m)	219 lb (99 kg)	31 3/4 in (0.81 m)	9 1/8 in (0.23 m)
All values from NFL Combine

=== Tampa Bay Buccaneers ===
The Tampa Bay Buccaneers selected Lynch in the third round (82nd pick overall) of the 1993 NFL draft. Concerns due to his professional baseball career caused teams to pass on Lynch as he remained unselected following the first two rounds. An executive with the Green Bay Packers placed a phone call to Lynch to gauge his dedication to solely playing football as they were considering drafting him with their first round pick (29th overall). He was asked, "Are you going to give up baseball?" Lynch responded, "Absolutely! If you draft me, I'm playing football and committing to the Green Bay Packers." The Packers selected safety George Teague in the first round (29th overall) instead of Lynch.

At the start of the third round, Stanford head coach Bill Walsh called Buccaneers' head coach Sam Wyche, who he coached while Wyche played for the Cincinnati Bengals. Walsh backed Lynch by assuring Sam Wyche that Lynch was fully dedicated to playing football. Sam Wyche proceeded to convince Bucs' owner Hugh Culverhouse enough for him to personally call Lynch and decided to give him an opportunity.

==== 1993 season ====
On May 15, 1993, the Tampa Bay Buccaneers signed Lynch to a two–year, $526,750 rookie contract that included an initial signing bonus of $250,000.

Lynch began his rookie season as a special teams player. He made his NFL regular-season debut and first NFL start in the season-opener against the Kansas City Chiefs and recorded a tackle during their 27–3 loss. On November 14, 1993, Lynch earned his third start of the season, replacing Marty Carter at strong safety. During week 11, Lynch recorded a season-high six combined tackles during a 45–21 loss against the San Francisco 49ers. He was demoted back to behind the backup strong safety after week 12.

Lynch finished his rookie season with ten combined tackles and two forced fumbles in 15 games and four starts.

==== 1994 season ====
Lynch remained as a backup strong safety under head coach Sam Wyche in 1994. In week 11, he collected a season-high four combined tackles in a 14–9 road loss to the Detroit Lions.

Lynch finished his second professional season with 16 combined tackles in 16 games and no starts.

==== 1995 season ====
Lynch competed against Barney Bussey to be the starting strong safety after it was left vacant by the departure of Marty Carter. Head coach Sam Wyche named Lynch the backup strong safety behind Bussey to begin the regular season. During week 6, Lynch recorded two combined tackles and made his first NFL interception during a 19–16 victory over the Cincinnati Bengals in week 6. Lynch made his first career interception off a pass attempt by Bengals quarterback Jeff Blake, that was intended for wide receiver Darnay Scott, in the fourth quarter. In the next game against the Minnesota Vikings, Lynch earned the job as the starting strong safety and had his breakout performance during the 20–17 victory, collecting a season-high 11 combined tackles (six solo), deflecting two passes, and making two interceptions off of Vikings quarterback Warren Moon. He attributes his performance to knowing Vikings head coach Dennis Green's impulses from playing under him at Stanford and studying Moon's tendencies. Lynch remained the starting strong safety for the remainder of the season but was inactive for three games (Weeks 12–14) due to an injury. On December 27, 1995, the Buccaneers announced their decision to fire head coach Sam Wyche after they finished with a 7–9 record in 1995.

Lynch finished the 1995 season with 38 combined tackles and three interceptions in nine games and six starts.

==== 1996 season ====
On January 23, 1996, the Buccaneers named Minnesota Vikings defensive coordinator Tony Dungy to be their new head coach. Dungy and defensive coordinator Monte Kiffin devised a Cover 2 defense that became known as the Tampa 2. Throughout training camp, Lynch competed against Todd Scott to retain his role as the starting strong safety. Lynch was sidelined for the first two preseason games due to a rib injury. Head coach Tony Dungy named Lynch the backup strong safety, behind Todd Scott, to begin the regular season.

On September 8, 1996, Todd Scott tore his Achilles tendon and was sidelined for the remainder of the season. Lynch subsequently became the starting strong safety and played alongside Melvin Johnson. In week 8, he collected five combined tackles and made his first NFL sack on quarterback Kent Graham for a five-yard loss in the fourth quarter of a 13–9 road loss to the Arizona Cardinals. In the next game, he recorded eight combined tackles and intercepted a pass by Packers quarterback Brett Favre during a 13–7 road loss to the Green Bay Packers. During week 13, Lynch recorded four combined tackles, forced a fumble, and an interception during a 13–7 victory over the New Orleans Saints. He intercepted a pass by Saints quarterback Jim Everett to seal the victory with 4:45 remaining.

Lynch finished the 1996 season with 100 combined tackles, three interceptions, two forced fumbles, and a sack in 16 games and 14 starts.

==== 1997 season ====
On September 5, 1997, the Buccaneers signed Lynch to a four-year, $6.8 million contract.

Head coach Tony Dungy retained Lynch as the starting strong safety to begin the regular season. He began the season starting alongside free safety Melvin Johnson. On September 19, 1997, Lynch received a $7,500 fine from the league for an illegal hit on Vikings wide receiver Chris Walsh while he was out of bounds. This became his second fine in the first three games as he also received a $5,000 fine for an illegal hit on 49ers running back William Floyd during the season-opener. In week 9, he collected a season-high 13 combined tackles as the Buccaneers lost 10–6 against the Minnesota Vikings. He started in all 16 games in 1997 and recorded 110 combined tackles, two interceptions, and forced a fumble. Lynch was named to the 1998 Pro Bowl, marking the first Pro Bowl selection in the first five years of his career.

“He is our equalizer. He's our eighth man in the box against the run. He'll take your head off. Everybody around here respects him for that.”

— Warren Sapp (1997)
(Regarding John Lynch as a teammate)

The Buccaneers finished second in the NFC Central with a 10–6 record and earned a wildcard berth. On December 28, 1997, Lynch started in his first career playoff game and recorded eight combined tackles as the Buccaneers defeated the Detroit Lions by a score of 20–10 in the NFC Wildcard Game. The following week, he made three combined tackles during a 21–7 road loss to the Green Bay Packers in the NFC Divisional Round.

==== 1998 season ====
In 1998, Lynch started alongside free safety Charles Mincy and cornerbacks Ronde Barber and Donnie Abraham. In week 5, he collected a season-high 13 combined tackles during a 20–3 victory against the New York Giants. Lynch was inactive for the week 10 loss to the Tennessee Oilers due to a neck injury. On December 13, 1998, Lynch recorded three combined tackles and made two interceptions as the Buccaneers defeated the Pittsburgh Steelers 16–3. Lynch made both interceptions off of pass attempts by Steelers quarterback Kordell Stewart. In week 16, Lynch made six combined tackles, a season-high two sacks, and forced a fumble during a 20–16 road loss to the Washington Redskins. He sacked Redskins quarterback Trent Green for a 14-yard loss and forced a fumble that was recovered by teammate Steve White in the first quarter.

Lynch finished the 1998 NFL season with 85 combined tackles, two interceptions, two sacks, and a forced fumble in 15 games and starts.

==== 1999 season ====
Lynch returned as the starter and played alongside free safety Damien Robinson in 1999. In week 10, Lynch collected a season-high 12 combined tackles and forced a fumble during a season debut 17–10 win against the Kansas City Chiefs. Lynch started in all 16 games in 1997 and recorded 116 combined tackles, two interceptions, forced a fumble, and was credited with half a sack. Lynch was named first-team A.P. All-Pro and was also selected to play in the 2000 Pro Bowl.

The Tampa Bay Buccaneers finished atop the NFC Central Division with an 11–5 record and earned a first-round bye. On January 15, 2000, Lynch recorded eight combined tackles and intercepted a pass by Redskins quarterback Brad Johnson during a 14–13 victory over the Washington Redskins in the NFC Divisional Round. The following week, Lynch recorded three tackles as the Buccaneers lost 11–6 at the St. Louis Rams in the NFC Championship Game.

==== 2000 season ====
On September 11, 2000, the Buccaneers signed Lynch to a six-year, $24 million contract extension that included $5.6 million guaranteed. Head coach Tony Dungy retained the starting secondary from the previous season, including safeties Lynch and Damien Robinson and cornerbacks Ronde Barber and Donnie Abraham. In week 6, he collected a season-high ten combined tackles during a 30–23 loss at the Minnesota Vikings. Lynch started in all 16 games in 2000 and recorded 94 combined tackles, three interceptions, and one sack.

==== 2001 season ====
Head coach Tony Dungy named Lynch the starting strong safety to begin the sixth consecutive season. He started alongside free safety Dexter Jackson in 2001. During week 5, Lynch collected a season-high 12 combined tackles (nine solo) during a 31–28 road loss to the Tennessee Titans.

Lynch finished the 2001 season with 87 combined tackles (62 solo), four pass deflections, three interceptions, and a sack in 16 games and starts. On January 2, 2002, it was announced that Lynch was selected to play in the 2002 Pro Bowl.

==== 2002 season ====
On January 14, 2002, the Buccaneers fired head coach Tony Dungy after they finished third in the NFC Central with a 9–7 record and lost to the Eagles for the second straight year in the playoffs. New head coach Jon Gruden retained defensive coordinator Monte Kiffin and defensive backs coach Mike Tomlin. He also retained Lynch and Dexter Jackson as the starting safeties alongside cornerbacks Ronde Barber and Brian Kelly.

During week 7, Lynch collected a season-high eight combined tackles during a 20–10 road loss to the Philadelphia Eagles. In the next game, he recorded three combined tackles, deflected three passes, and made two interceptions in a 12–9 road victory over the Carolina Panthers. Lynch intercepted both passes off Panthers quarterback Randy Fasani.

Lynch finished the 2002 season with 64 combined tackles (41 solo), five pass deflections, and three interceptions in 15 games and starts. The Buccaneers finished atop the NFC South with a 12–4 record and earned a first-round bye. The Buccaneers defeated the San Francisco 49ers 31–6 in the NFC Divisional Round. On January 19, 2003, Lynch recorded six solo tackles and broke up a pass during a 27–10 road victory over the Philadelphia Eagles in the NFC Championship Game. On January 26, 2003, Lynch started in Super Bowl XXXVII and recorded a tackle and pass deflection during the 48–21 victory over the Oakland Raiders.

==== 2003 season ====
Head coach Jon Gruden named Lynch the starting strong safety to begin the regular season, alongside free safety Dwight Smith. During week 2, Lynch collected a season-high 11 combined tackles (seven solo) during a 12–9 loss to the Carolina Panthers. He was inactive for two games (Weeks 8–9) due to a shoulder injury. Lynch finished the season with 72 combined tackles (50 solo), six pass deflections, two interceptions, and was credited with half a sack in 14 games and starts.

On March 12, 2004, the Buccaneers released Lynch in a salary cap-related maneuver. He offered to take a significant pay cut to remain with the team, but the offer was rebuffed.

=== Denver Broncos ===
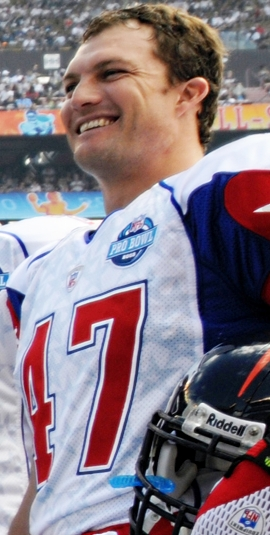
Lynch at the 2008 Pro Bowl as a member of the Denver Broncos

On March 22, 2004, the Denver Broncos signed Lynch to a three-year, $9 million contract as an unrestricted free agent. He signed a free agent contract with the Broncos despite being courted by the two-time defending Super Bowl Champion New England Patriots. Lynch also received an offer from the New York Jets but opted not to reunite with head coach Herm Edwards who had previously been his defensive backs coach with the Buccaneers.

In the 2005 season, Lynch nearly made his second Super Bowl appearance after the Broncos defeated the Patriots in the Divisional Round, but they lost to the Pittsburgh Steelers in the AFC Championship Game.

Lynch served as the Broncos' defensive captain in 2006 and 2007, receiving both the Bart Starr Award and the Alan Page Community Award in 2007. On July 31, 2008, he was granted his release by the Broncos. Lynch said in a news conference that his lack of playing time heading into the 2008 season was a reason for his departure.

=== New England Patriots ===
Lynch visited with the New England Patriots on August 13, 2008, then agreed to a one-year deal worth $1.5 million. However, he was released on September 1.

=== Retirement ===
On November 17, 2008, Lynch announced his retirement from football.

== NFL career statistics ==
Legend
	Won the Super Bowl
**Bold**	Career high

=== Regular season ===
Year	Team	Games		Tackles				Fumbles				Interceptions					
Year	Team	GP	GS	Cmb	Solo	Ast	Sck	FF	FR	Yds	TD	Int	Yds	Avg	Lng	TD	PD
1993	TB	15	4	10	9	1	0.0	1	0	0	0	0	0	0.0	0	0	0
1994	TB	16	0	16	11	5	0.0	0	0	0	0	0	0	0.0	0	0	0
1995	TB	9	6	38	27	11	0.0	0	0	0	0	**3**	3	1.0	3	0	0
1996	TB	16	14	100	71	29	1.0	2	1	0	0	**3**	26	8.7	25	0	0
1997	TB	16	16	109	74	35	0.0	0	**2**	0	0	2	28	14.0	28	0	0
1998	TB	15	15	85	50	35	2.0	1	1	0	0	2	29	14.5	17	0	0
1999	TB	16	16	**117**	**81**	**36**	0.5	1	0	0	0	2	32	**16.0**	28	0	9
2000	TB	16	16	85	56	29	1.0	0	2	0	0	**3**	**43**	14.3	**36**	0	8
2001	TB	16	16	87	62	25	1.0	1	1	0	0	**3**	21	7.0	15	0	8
2002	TB	15	15	64	41	23	0.0	0	0	0	0	**3**	0	0.0	0	0	9
2003	TB	14	14	72	50	22	0.5	0	0	0	0	2	18	9.0	18	0	8
2004	DEN	15	15	64	47	17	2.0	3	0	0	0	1	2	2.0	2	0	**10**
2005	DEN	16	16	61	44	17	**4.0**	**4**	0	0	0	2	2	1.0	1	0	8
2006	DEN	16	16	84	59	25	0.0	2	1	0	0	0	0	0.0	0	0	5
2007	DEN	13	12	59	46	13	1.0	0	0	0	0	0	0	0.0	0	0	3
Career		224	191	1,051	728	323	13.0	15	8	0	0	26	204	7.8	36	0	68

=== Postseason ===
Year	Team	Games		Tackles				Fumbles				Interceptions					
Year	Team	GP	GS	Cmb	Solo	Ast	Sck	FF	FR	Yds	TD	Int	Yds	Avg	Lng	TD	PD
1997	TB	2	2	11	9	2	0.0	0	0	0	0	0	0	0.0	0	0	0
1999	TB	2	2	11	9	2	0.0	0	0	0	0	**1**	0	0.0	0	0	**3**
2000	TB	1	1	9	4	**5**	0.0	0	0	0	0	0	0	0.0	0	0	1
2001	TB	1	1	5	3	2	0.0	0	0	0	0	0	0	0.0	0	0	0
2002	TB	3	3	**15**	**15**	0	0.0	0	0	0	0	0	0	0.0	0	0	2
2004	DEN	1	1	3	1	2	0.0	0	0	0	0	0	0	0.0	0	0	1
2005	DEN	2	2	11	9	2	0.0	0	0	0	0	**1**	**5**	**5.0**	**5**	0	2
Career		12	12	63	48	15	0.0	0	0	0	0	2	5	2.5	5	0	9

== Broadcasting career ==
On November 23, 2008, Lynch joined NFL on Fox in the broadcasting booth as a color commentator, and was paired with Chris Rose and Kevin Burkhardt.

Lynch was officially inducted into the Broncos Ring of Fame on October 23, 2016, in a ceremony at Sports Authority Field at Mile High, joining kicker Jason Elam and linebacker Simon Fletcher in the class of 2016. A month later, Lynch was inducted into the Buccaneers Ring of Honor in a ceremony at Raymond James Stadium.

== Executive career ==
While Kyle Shanahan was still offensive coordinator for the Atlanta Falcons and considering taking the head coaching position for the San Francisco 49ers, John Lynch contacted Shanahan and asked him to keep him in mind for the general manager position. A short time later, Kyle Shanahan introduced John Lynch to Jed York, and he was then hired as the general manager on January 29, 2017. He was named the 2019 Executive of the Year by the Pro Football Writers Association after the 49ers finished atop the NFC West with a 13–3 record. Lynch signed a contract extension and was given the additional title of "president of football operations" in September 2023. On August 30, 2024, Lynch was named to the NFL Competition Committee by commissioner Roger Goodell.

== Personal life ==
Lynch is married to Linda Allred, the older sister of his close friend and former NFL tight end John Allred. He and Allred had a run-in during a 1997 NFL game that resulted in Allred almost getting knocked out from a hit. His father, John Lynch Sr., is a retired radio executive in San Diego, a founder of the sports talk station XEPRS-AM 1090. His son, Jake, played football at Stanford from 2018 until 2021.
