= Crisman =

Crisman is a surname. Notable people with the surname include:

- Fred Crisman (1919–1975), American fighter pilot and educator
- Joel Crisman (born 1971), American football player
- Nino Crisman (1911–1983), Italian actor and film producer

== See also ==
- Crisman, Colorado
