= Game manager =

Quarterback in American football doing just enough to win games

In American football, a game manager is a quarterback who, despite pedestrian individual statistics such as passing yards and touchdowns, also maintains low numbers of mistakes, such as interceptions and fumbles. Such a quarterback is not seen as a major factor in the team's wins or their losses; his performance is good enough to not negatively affect the performances of other players on his team, even if he himself does not have the skills to be considered an elite player. Game managers often benefit from strong defense and rushing offense on their teams.

Arizona Sports said that "game manager" was "a term that often comes with negative connotations of a non-talented, play-it-safe type of quarterback". The New York Times called it a "backhanded compliment". The San Francisco Chronicle wrote, "As consolation ... Quarterbacks are called game managers only if they're winning." The Associated Press opined, "But like any cliche, [game manager is] oversimplified". Former Indianapolis Colts president Bill Polian laughed, "Every quarterback is a game manager, it's what the job is all about". Nick Saban said, "I don't think you can be a good quarterback unless you're a really good game manager". The Los Angeles Times noted that although Trent Dilfer was not an elite quarterback, the 2000 Baltimore Ravens won the Super Bowl with a dominant defense and Dilfer as a game manager. Peyton Manning, who was a five-time NFL Most Valuable Player, transitioned into a game manager role with a defensive-oriented Denver Broncos squad in his final season in 2015, when he won his second championship and became at the time the oldest quarterback to win a Super Bowl, at age 39.

== See also ==
- Journeyman quarterback
