= Eric Curry =

American football player (born 1970)

No. 75
- Position: Defensive end

Personal information
- Born: February 3, 1970 (age 56); Thomasville, Georgia, U.S.
- Listed height: 6 ft 5 in (1.96 m)
- Listed weight: 270 lb (122 kg)

Career information
- High school: Thomasville
- College: Alabama
- NFL draft: 1993: 1st round, 6th overall pick

Career history
- Tampa Bay Buccaneers (1993–1997); Green Bay Packers (1998)*; Jacksonville Jaguars (1998–2000)
- * Offseason or practice squad member only

Awards and highlights
- PFWA All-Rookie Team (1993); Consensus national championship (1992); UPI Lineman of the Year (1992); Consensus All-American (1992); First-team All-SEC (1992); Second-team All-SEC (1991)

Career NFL statistics
- Tackles: 95
- Sacks: 12.5
- Forced fumbles: 7
- Stats at Pro Football Reference

Eric Felece Curry (born February 3, 1970) is an American former professional football player who was a defensive end for seven seasons in the National Football League (NFL) during the 1990s. He played college football for the Alabama Crimson Tide, and earned consensus All-American honors. A first-round pick in the 1993 NFL draft, he played professionally for the Tampa Bay Buccaneers, Green Bay Packers and Jacksonville Jaguars of the NFL.

== Early life ==
Curry was born in Thomasville, Georgia. He graduated from Thomasville High School, and played for the Thomasville High School Bulldogs high school football team.

== College career ==
Curry accepted an athletic scholarship to attend the University of Alabama, where he played for coach Bill Curry and coach Gene Stallings' Alabama Crimson Tide football teams from 1989 to 1992. As a senior in 1992, Curry was recognized as a consensus first-team All-American and the United Press International Lineman of the Year. He was a member of the Crimson Tide squad that won the first SEC Championship Game in 1992, and a consensus national championship by defeating the Miami Hurricanes 34–13 in the Sugar Bowl. Curry and fellow defensive end John Copeland were known as the "bookends" during their time at Alabama, and were key players in the Crimson Tide's No. 1 rated defense in 1992.

== Professional career ==
The Tampa Bay Buccaneers selected Curry in the first round, with the sixth overall pick, of the 1993 NFL Draft. He gained notoriety for happily hugging the NFL Commissioner, Paul Tagliabue, after he was picked by the Buccaneers in the draft. He played for the Buccaneers from 1993 to 1997. He signed a free agent deal with the Green Bay Packers in 1998, but was released during the preseason. Curry played for the Jacksonville Jaguars from 1998 to 1999. In seven NFL seasons, Curry played in 75 regular season games, started 44 of them, and contributed 95 tackles, 12.5 quarterback sacks, and seven forced fumbles.

=== NFL statistics ===
Year	Team	Games	Combined tackles	Tackles	Assisted tackles	Sacks	Forced fumbles	Fumble recoveries
1993	TB	10	18	14	4	5.0	2	1
1994	TB	15	23	17	6	3.0	2	0
1995	TB	16	29	25	4	2.0	1	1
1996	TB	12	8	8	0	2.0	1	0
1997	TB	6	1	1	0	0.0	0	0
1998	JAX	11	6	3	3	0.0	0	0
1999	JAX	5	5	4	1	0.5	0	0
Career		75	90	72	18	12.5	6	2

== Life after football ==
As of 2020, Curry resides in Jacksonville, Florida.
