= 1994 All-Atlantic Coast Conference football team =

American college football all-star team

The 1994 All-Atlantic Coast Conference football team consists of American football players chosen by various selectors for their All-Atlantic Coast Conference ("ACC") teams for the 1994 college football season. Selectors in 1994 included the Associated Press (AP).

== Offensive selections ==
=== Wide receivers ===
- Kez McCorvey, Florida St. (AP-1)
- Eddie Goines, NC State (AP-1)
- Tyrone Davis, Virginia (AP-2)
- Geroy Simon, Maryland (AP-2)

=== Tackles ===
- Matt Williams, Duke (AP-1)
- Steve Ingram, Maryland (AP-1)
- Roger Purgason, North Carolina (AP-2)
- Chris Hennie-Roed, NC State (AP-2)

=== Guards ===
- Patrick McNeil, Florida St. (AP-1)
- Lewis Tyre, Florida St. (AP-1)
- Steve Keim, NC State (AP-2)
- Brian Bravy, Georgia Tech (AP-2)

=== Centers ===
- Clay Shiver, Florida State (AP-1)
- Jeroen Egge, Duke (AP-2)

=== Tight ends ===
- Greg DeLong, North Carolina (AP-1)
- Bill Khayat, Duke (AP-2)

=== Quarterbacks ===
- Danny Kanell, Florida State (AP-1)
- Scott Milanovich, Maryland (AP-2)

=== Running backs ===
- Robert Baldwin, Duke (AP-1)
- Warrick Dunn, Florida State (AP-1)
- Leon Johnson, North Carolina (AP-2)
- Tremayne Stephens, NC State (AP-2)

== Defensive selections ==
=== Defensive linemen ===
- Derrick Alexander, Florida St. (AP-1)
- Marcus Jones, North Carolina (AP-1)
- Mike Frederick, Virginia (AP-1)
- Carl Reeves, NC State (AP-2)
- Ryan Kuehl, Virginia (AP-2)
- Marvin Cross, Clemson (AP-2)

=== Linebackers ===
- Damien Covington, NC State (AP-1)
- Tim Jones, Clemson (AP-1)
- Derrick Brooks, Florida St. (AP-1)
- John Zuanich, Duke (AP-1)
- Jamal Cox, Georgia Tech (AP-2)
- Billy Granville, Duke (AP-2)
- Wardell Rouse, Clemson (AP-2)
- Jamie Sharper, Virginia (AP-2)

=== Defensive backs ===
- Ray Farmer, Duke (AP-1)
- Clifton Abraham, Florida St. (AP-1)
- Ronde Barber, Virginia (AP-1)
- Corey Fuller, Florida St. (AP-1)
- Devin Bush Sr., Florida St. (AP-2)
- Lethon Flowers, Georgia Tech (AP-2)
- Richard Goodpasture, Wake Forest (AP-2)
- Brian Dawkins, Clemson (AP-2)

== Special teams ==
=== Placekickers ===
- Steve Videtich, NC State (AP-1)
- Nelson Welch, Clemson (AP-2)

=== Punters ===
- Jason Bender, Georgia Tech (AP-1)
- Will Brice, Virginia (AP-2)

== Key ==
AP = Associated Press

== See also ==
1994 College Football All-America Team
