= NFL competition committee =

Determines National Football League rules

The National Football League (NFL) competition committee was created in 1968 following the announcement of the AFL–NFL merger. It replaced the NFL Rules Committee, which was formed in 1932 when the NFL adopted its own rulebook. Prior to 1932 the NFL used the college football rulebook.

Members of the Competition Committee are chosen by the NFL commissioner. The current members are:

- Rich McKay (co-chairman) – CEO, Atlanta Falcons
- Stephen Jones (co-chairman) – executive vice president and CEO, Dallas Cowboys
- Katie Blackburn – executive vice president, Cincinnati Bengals
- Todd Bowles – head coach, Tampa Bay Buccaneers
- John Lynch – general manager, San Francisco 49ers
- John Mara – CEO and co-owner, New York Giants
- Sean McVay – head coach, Los Angeles Rams
- Kevin O'Connell – head coach, Minnesota Vikings
- Sean Payton – head coach, Denver Broncos
- DeMeco Ryans – head coach, Houston Texans
- Mike Vrabel – head coach, New England Patriots

Each year, the committee reviews the competitive aspects of NFL football and may, based on its findings, propose new rules and rule changes. However new rules and rule changes cannot be adopted unless supported by 75% of NFL team owners (which is currently 24 out of 32 team owners).
