= Darnell Stephens =

American football player (born 1973)

No. 54
- Position: Linebacker

Personal information
- Born: January 29, 1973 (age 53); San Antonio, Texas, U.S.
- Listed height: 5 ft 11 in (1.80 m)
- Listed weight: 243 lb (110 kg)

Career information
- High school: Converse (TX) Judson
- College: Clemson
- NFL draft: 1995: undrafted

Career history
- Tampa Bay Buccaneers (1995–1996)
- Stats at Pro Football Reference

Darnell Stephens (born January 29, 1973) is an American former professional football player who was a linebacker for the Tampa Bay Buccaneers of the National Football League (NFL) from 1995 to 1996. He played college football for the Clemson Tigers.
