= Hardy Nickerson =

American football player and coach (born 1965)

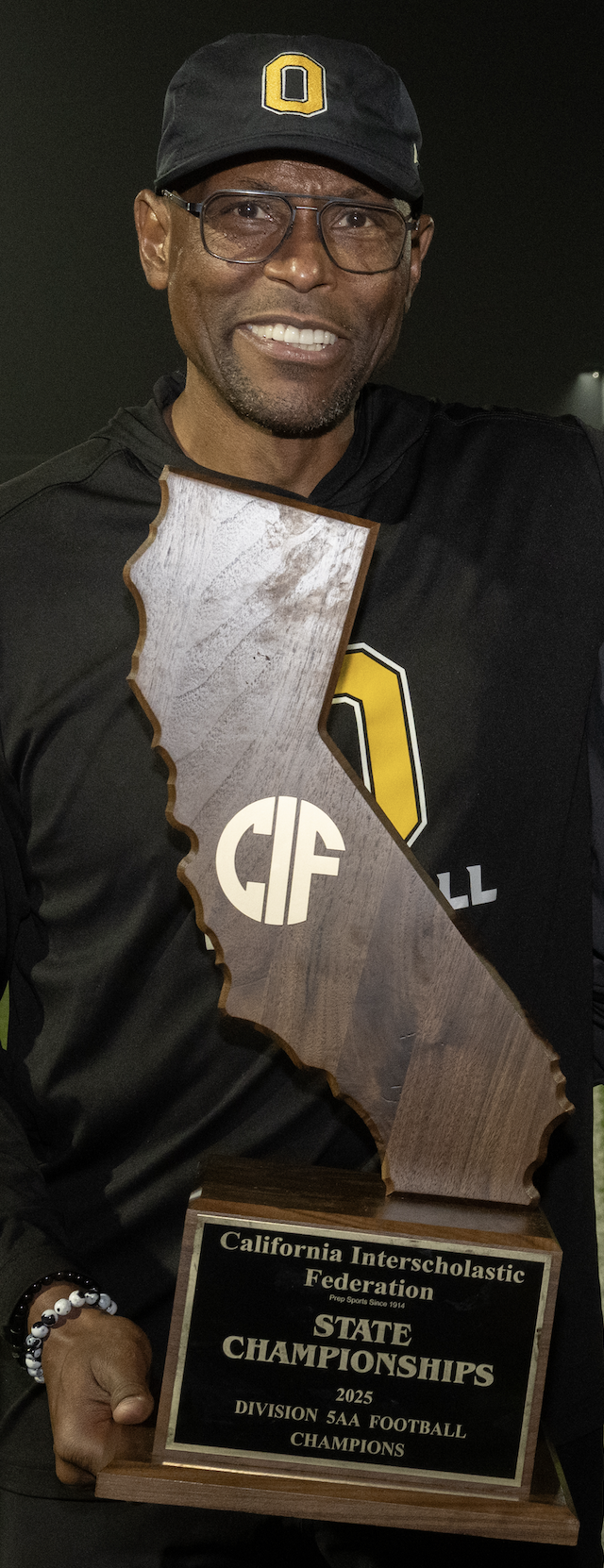
- Nickerson - 2025 State Championship trophy

No. 54, 56
- Position: Linebacker

Personal information
- Born: September 1, 1965 (age 61); Compton, California, U.S.
- Listed height: 6 ft 2 in (1.88 m)
- Listed weight: 233 lb (106 kg)

Career information
- High school: Verbum Dei (Los Angeles, California)
- College: California (1983–1986)
- NFL draft: 1987: 5th round, 122nd overall pick

Career history
- As player: Pittsburgh Steelers (1987–1992); Tampa Bay Buccaneers (1993–1999); Jacksonville Jaguars (2000–2001); Green Bay Packers (2002); As coach: Chicago Bears (2007) (LB); Bishop O'Dowd HS (CA) (2010–2013) (HC); Tampa Bay Buccaneers (2014–2015) (LB); San Francisco 49ers (2016) (LB); Illinois (2017–2018) (DC/LB); Bishop O'Dowd HS (CA) (2022–2025) (HC); JSerra Catholic HS (CA) (2026-Present) (HC)

Awards and highlights
- "Whizzer" White NFL Man of the Year (1997); 2× First-team All-Pro (1993, 1997); 2× Second-team All-Pro (1996, 1999); 5× Pro Bowl (1993, 1996–1999); NFL combined tackles leader (1993); NFL 1990s All-Decade Team; First-team All-Pac-10 (1985); 2× Second-team All-Pac-10 (1984, 1986); NFL record: Most combined tackles in a season: 214 (1993)

Career NFL statistics
- Total tackles: 1,586
- Sacks: 21.0
- Forced fumbles: 19
- Fumble recoveries: 14
- Interceptions: 12
- Stats at Pro Football Reference

Hardy Otto Nickerson Sr. (born September 1, 1965) is an American former professional football player and coach. He played as a linebacker for four teams over 16 seasons in the National Football League (NFL) from 1987 to 2002. He played college football for the California Golden Bears. He was selected by the Pittsburgh Steelers in the fifth round of the 1987 NFL draft. Nickerson spent the prime of his career with the Tampa Bay Buccaneers. The hiring of head coaches Sam Wyche and Tony Dungy allowed him to play in the middle in a 4–3 defense for both coaches; Nickerson played in a 3–4 defense with the Steelers. While playing in the 4–3, he went to five Pro Bowls, and was selected for the National Football League 1990s All-Decade Team.

On December 17, 2025 he was named as head coach at JSerra Catholic High School in San Juan Capistrano, CA.

== Early life ==
Nickerson attended Verbum Dei High School, a Catholic school located in Watts, Los Angeles. He earned a BA degree in sociology from the University of California, Berkeley in 1989.

== Professional career ==
The Pittsburgh Steelers selected Nickerson in the fifth round (122nd overall) of the 1987 NFL draft. He was the 22nd linebacker drafted and became the first of two linebackers the Steelers drafted in 1987, alongside sixth round pick (150th overall) Greg Lloyd.

== Broadcasting and coaching ==
In 2006, Nickerson became the color analyst for the Buccaneer Radio Network, teaming him with the longtime veteran play-by-play man Gene Deckerhoff.

On February 23, 2007, Nickerson was named linebackers coach of the Chicago Bears, where he coached for his former Tampa Bay position coach, Lovie Smith. On January 8, 2008, he resigned from the Bears due to health issues within his family.

On April 15, 2010, Nickerson was hired as the head football coach at Bishop O'Dowd High School in Oakland, California, a traditional powerhouse that has produced future NFL players such as Tarik Glenn, Langston Walker, Kirk Morrison, and Eric Bjornson. During Nickerson's tenure, he led the Dragons to back to back league titles and was also responsible for producing nearly 20 scholarship athletes in a period of three years. Nickerson stepped down from the head coaching position on November 18, 2013.

Nickerson was named the linebackers coach for the Tampa Bay Buccaneers under Lovie Smith on January 7, 2014. On January 23, 2016, Nickerson was hired by the San Francisco 49ers as linebackers coach under new head coach Chip Kelly. On March 10, 2016, Nickerson was hired by the University of Illinois as defensive coordinator under new head coach Lovie Smith. On October 30, 2018, Nickerson announced his resignation as defensive coordinator citing health reasons.

On April 7, 2022, Nickerson returned as the head football coach at Bishop O'Dowd High School.

Nickerson's Dragons claimed the CIF North Coast Section Championship on November 29, 2025 beating Fortuna High School 59-21. This was Bishop O'Dowd's second consecutive appearance in the North Coast Section finals, losing to Amador Valley in 2024.

In the CIF State Division 5-AA playoffs, Bishop O'Dowd earned the CIF NorCal Championship vs. Chico High School (23-20) on December 5, 2025. A week later, the Dragons won the Division 5-AA state title by defeating El Cajon Christian 37-0, capping an 11-4 season.

On December 17, 2025, Nickerson was announced as the head football coach at JSerra Catholic High School in San Juan Capistrano, California.

== NFL career statistics ==
Legend
	Led the league
**Bold**	Career high

=== Regular season ===
Year	Team	Games		Tackles					Interceptions				Fumbles	
Year	Team	GP	GS	Cmb	Solo	Ast	TFL	Sck	Int	Yds	TD	PD	FF	FR
1987	PIT	12	0	17	–	–	–	0.0	0	0	0	0	0	1
1988	PIT	15	10	99	–	–	–	**3.5**	1	0	0	8	1	1
1989	PIT	10	8	29	24	5	–	1.0	0	0	0	6	0	0
1990	PIT	16	14	63	54	9	–	2.0	0	0	0	5	2	0
1991	PIT	16	14	95	71	24	–	1.0	0	0	0	1	2	0
1992	PIT	15	15	114	–	–	–	2.0	–	–	–	–	0	2
1993	TB	16	16	**214**	–	–	–	1.0	1	6	0	–	1	1
1994	TB	14	14	122	86	36	–	1.0	2	9	0	–	1	0
1995	TB	16	16	143	89	**54**	–	1.5	–	–	–	–	**3**	**3**
1996	TB	16	16	120	76	44	–	3.0	2	**24**	0	–	2	2
1997	TB	16	16	147	**105**	42	–	1.0	–	–	–	–	2	2
1998	TB	10	10	70	45	25	–	1.0	–	–	–	–	1	1
1999	TB	16	16	110	66	44	**6**	0.5	2	18	0	5	**3**	0
2000	JAX	6	6	31	27	4	2	1.0	1	10	0	7	0	0
2001	JAX	15	14	117	89	28	4	0.0	**3**	4	0	**9**	1	1
2002	GB	16	15	86	49	37	4	1.5	–	–	–	3	0	0
Career		225	200	1,586	632	314	16	21.0	12	71	0	24	19	14

== Personal life ==
His son Hardy Nickerson Jr. is a former linebacker who played in the National Football League for the Cincinnati Bengals and the Minnesota Vikings.
