= Melvin Johnson (American football) =

American football player (born 1972)

No. 25, 35
- Position: Safety

Personal information
- Born: April 15, 1972 (age 54); Cincinnati, Ohio, U.S.
- Listed height: 6 ft 0 in (1.83 m)
- Listed weight: 204 lb (93 kg)

Career information
- High school: St. Xavier (Cincinnati)
- College: Kentucky
- NFL draft: 1995: 2nd round, 43rd overall pick

Career history
- Tampa Bay Buccaneers (1995–1997); Kansas City Chiefs (1998); Washington Redskins (1998)*; San Diego Chargers (1999)*
- * Offseason or practice squad member only

Awards and highlights
- First-team All-SEC (1994)

Career NFL statistics
- Tackles: 165
- Interceptions: 4
- Sacks: 1
- Stats at Pro Football Reference

Melvin Johnson (born April 15, 1972) is an American former professional football player who was a safety in the National Football League (NFL). After graduating from St. Xavier High School in 1990 and playing college football for the Kentucky Wildcats, he was selected by the Tampa Bay Buccaneers in the second round of the 1995 NFL draft. Johnson later played for the Kansas City Chiefs in 1998.

== NFL career statistics ==
Legend
**Bold**	Career high

=== Regular season ===
Year	Team	Games		Tackles					Interceptions					Fumbles			
Year	Team	GP	GS	Cmb	Solo	Ast	Sck	TFL	Int	Yds	TD	Lng	PD	FF	FR	Yds	TD
1995	TAM	11	3	26	20	6	0.0	-	1	0	0	0	-	0	0	0	0
1996	TAM	**16**	**16**	**80**	**61**	**19**	0.0	-	**2**	**24**	0	**24**	-	**1**	**1**	0	0
1997	TAM	**16**	7	51	41	10	0.0	-	1	19	0	19	-	0	0	0	0
1998	KAN	7	1	8	6	2	**1.0**	-	0	0	0	0	-	0	0	0	0
		50	27	165	128	37	1.0	-	4	43	0	24	-	1	1	0	0

=== Playoffs ===
Year	Team	Games		Tackles					Interceptions					Fumbles			
Year	Team	GP	GS	Cmb	Solo	Ast	Sck	TFL	Int	Yds	TD	Lng	PD	FF	FR	Yds	TD
1997	TAM	**2**	0	**6**	**6**	0	0.0	-	0	0	0	0	0	0	0	0	0
		2	0	6	6	0	0.0	-	0	0	0	0	0	0	0	0	0
