= Marcus Jones (athlete) =

American football player and mixed martial artist

No. 78
- Positions: Defensive end, defensive tackle

Personal information
- Born: August 15, 1973 (age 53); Jacksonville, North Carolina, U.S.
- Listed height: 6 ft 6 in (1.98 m)
- Listed weight: 278 lb (126 kg)

Career information
- High school: Southwest (Jacksonville)
- College: North Carolina
- NFL draft: 1996: 1st round, 22nd overall pick

Career history
- Tampa Bay Buccaneers (1996–2002); Buffalo Bills (2002)

Awards and highlights
- Consensus All-American (1995); Third-team All-American (1994); ACC Defensive Player of the Year (1995); 2× First-team All-ACC (1994, 1995); Second-team All-ACC (1993); North Carolina Tar Heels Jersey No. 71 honored

Career NFL statistics
- Tackles: 124
- Sacks: 24
- Fumble recoveries: 4
- Stats at Pro Football Reference

Marcus Jones
- Other names: The Darkness; Big Baby
- Height: 6 ft 6 in (1.98 m)
- Weight: 265 lb (120 kg; 18 st 13 lb)
- Division: Heavyweight
- Reach: 80 in (203 cm)
- Fighting out of: Tampa, Florida
- Team: Gracie Tampa
- Years active: 2007–2009 (MMA)

Mixed martial arts record
- Total: 6
- Wins: 4
- By knockout: 3
- By submission: 1
- Losses: 2
- By knockout: 2

Other information
- Mixed martial arts record from Sherdog

Marcus Edward Jones (born August 15, 1973) is an American former mixed martial artist fighter and former professional football player who was a defensive end in the National Football League (NFL) for seven seasons. He played college football for the North Carolina Tar Heels, earning consensus All-American honors in 1995. A first-round pick in the 1996 NFL draft, he played professional football for the NFL's Tampa Bay Buccaneers. After retiring from the NFL, he became a mixed martial arts fighter, and was a cast member of SpikeTV's The Ultimate Fighter: Heavyweights.

== Early life ==
Jones was born in Jacksonville, North Carolina. He attended Southwest Onslow High School in Jacksonville, and played high school football for the Southwest Stallions. Jones accepted an athletic scholarship to attend the University of North Carolina, where he played for the North Carolina Tar Heels football team from 1992 to 1995. He set the Tar Heels' career sack record (subsequently broken by Greg Ellis), and was recognized as a consensus first-team All-American in 1995.

== Professional career ==
The Tampa Bay Buccaneers selected in the first round (22nd overall) of the 1996 NFL draft. He played for the Buccaneers from 1996 to 2002. Jones played his entire active professional career with the Buccaneers, playing in 85 games, starting 39 of them, and recording 24 sacks. He was released by the Buccaneers in October 2002. He was signed by the Buffalo Bills, but was placed on injured reserve and was waived after suffering a knee injury.

== Mixed martial arts career ==
Jones trained under Rob Kahn in Gracie Tampa in Tampa, Florida. He made his professional MMA debut on October 26, 2007, in World Fighting Championships 5 with a victory over Will Mora. In his next fight, Jones took on Eduardo Boza, and defeated him via technical knockout midway through round one.

Jones took his first loss to Daniel Perez. Jones won two fights in a row after the loss before being selected to appear on the tenth season of The Ultimate Fighter.

=== The Ultimate Fighter ===
Jones was a competitor on The Ultimate Fighter which began filming on June 1, 2009 and started airing on September 16, 2009. During pre-selection training, Jones was shown to struggle with a lack of stamina which potentially led to him being one of the final picks for Team Rampage.

During the competition, Jones suffered through problems in the house, such as a slight knee injury as well as a severe case of sweating, prompting concerns about his availability for the competition. Upon recovery, Jones had his first fight against Team Rashad's Mike Wessel, winning via armbar submission in the first round, making him the only member of Team Rampage to make it past the preliminary rounds. In the quarterfinals, Jones gave Darrill Schoonover his first mixed martial arts defeat by knocking Schoonover out. Jones was defeated in a semifinal bout against Brendan Schaub by KO in the first round.

=== Ultimate Fighting Championships ===
For his official UFC debut, Jones returned for the finale to square off against Matt Mitrione, where Jones suffered another knockout in the second round. After this fight, he decided to retire from MMA so he could spend more time with his family.

== Mixed martial arts record ==
Professional record breakdown
| 6 matches | 4 wins | 2 losses |
| By knockout | 3 | 2 |
| By submission | 1 | 0 |

| Res. | Record | Opponent | Method | Event | Date | Round | Time | Location | Notes |
|---|---|---|---|---|---|---|---|---|---|
| Loss | 4–2 | Matt Mitrione | KO (punch) | The Ultimate Fighter: Heavyweights Finale | December 5, 2009 | 2 | 0:10 | Las Vegas, Nevada, United States | |
| Win | 4–1 | John Juarez | TKO (punches) | XCF 1: Rumble in Racetown | February 14, 2009 | 1 | 1:39 | Daytona Beach, Florida, United States | |
| Win | 3–1 | Mike Ottman | TKO (punches) | Revolution Fight Club 2 | December 19, 2008 | 1 | 1:24 | Miami, Florida, United States | |
| Loss | 2–1 | Daniel Perez | KO (punches) | WFC 6: Battle in the Bay | March 22, 2008 | 1 | 1:26 | Tampa, Florida, United States | |
| Win | 2–0 | Eduardo Boza | TKO (punches) | Revolution Fight Club 10: Bad Blood | November 10, 2007 | 1 | 2:32 | Tampa, Florida, United States | |
| Win | 1–0 | Will Mora | Submission (kimura) | World Fighting Championships 5 | October 26, 2007 | 1 | 1:02 | Tampa, Florida, United States | |

=== Mixed martial arts exhibition record ===
| Exhibition record breakdown | | |
| 3 matches | 2 wins | 1 loss |
| By knockout | 1 | 1 |
| By submission | 1 | 0 |

| Res. | Record | Opponent | Method | Event | Date | Round | Time | Location | Notes |
|---|---|---|---|---|---|---|---|---|---|
| Loss | 2–1 | Brendan Schaub | KO (punches) | The Ultimate Fighter: Heavyweights | | 1 | 2:11 | Las Vegas, Nevada, United States | Semi-finals. |
| Win | 2–0 | Darrill Schoonover | KO (punches) | The Ultimate Fighter: Heavyweights | | 1 | N/A | Las Vegas, Nevada, United States | Quarter-finals. |
| Win | 1–0 | Mike Wessel | Submission (armbar) | The Ultimate Fighter: Heavyweights | | 1 | N/A | Las Vegas, Nevada, United States | Preliminary bout. |
