= Wardell Rouse =

American football player (born 1972)

No. 52
- Position: Linebacker

Personal information
- Born: June 9, 1972 (age 54); Clewiston, Florida, U.S.
- Listed height: 6 ft 2 in (1.88 m)
- Listed weight: 235 lb (107 kg)

Career information
- High school: Clewiston
- College: Clemson
- NFL draft: 1995: 6th round, 179th overall pick

Career history
- Tampa Bay Buccaneers (1995–1996); Rhein Fire (1998)

Awards and highlights
- Second-team All-ACC (1994)

Career NFL statistics
- Tackles: 7
- Sacks: 0.5
- Stats at Pro Football Reference

Wardell Rouse (born June 9, 1972) is an American former professional football player who was a linebacker for the Tampa Bay Buccaneers of the National Football League (NFL). He played college football for the Clemson Tigers before being selected by the Buccaneers in the sixth round of the 1995 NFL draft.
