= Steve Ingram (American football) =

American football player (born 1971)

No. 65, 67
- Position: Offensive tackle

Personal information
- Born: May 8, 1971 (age 55); Cheverly, Maryland, U.S.
- Listed height: 6 ft 4 in (1.93 m)
- Listed weight: 324 lb (147 kg)

Career information
- High school: DuVal (Lanham, Maryland)
- College: Maryland (1989–1994)
- NFL draft: 1995: 7th round, 215th overall pick

Career history
- Tampa Bay Buccaneers (1995–1998); Jacksonville Jaguars (1999–2000); Los Angeles Xtreme (2001)*
- * Offseason or practice squad member only

Awards and highlights
- Second-team All-American (1994); First-team All-ACC (1994)

Career NFL statistics
- Games played: 8
- Stats at Pro Football Reference

Stephen Anthony Ingram (born May 8, 1971) is an American former professional football tackle who played for the Tampa Bay Buccaneers and Jacksonville Jaguars of the National Football League (NFL). He played college football for the Maryland Terrapins.

== Early life ==
Ingram was born on May 8, 1971, in Cheverly, Maryland. He attended DuVal High School in Lanham, Maryland where he played basketball and football. On March 7, 1989, Ingram signed a National Letter of Intent to play college football at the University of Maryland.

== College career ==
Ingram played college football for the Maryland Terrapins from 1989 to 1994. He redshirted his first year and then lettered in 1990. In the 1991 opener against the Virginia, Ingram suffered a fractured fibula in his right leg, ending his season. He was granted a medical redshirt, which earned him an extra year of eligibility. Ingram played the next three seasons, foregoing to enter the 1994 NFL draft. He earned first-team All-Atlantic Coast Conference and second-team All-American honors in 1994.

== Professional career ==
=== Tampa Bay Buccaneers ===
Ingram was selected in the seventh round, with the 215th overall selection, by the Tampa Bay Buccaneers in the 1995 NFL draft. In his rookie season, he played in two games. On August 22, 1996, he was waived by the team. On November 13, he was re-signed by the Buccaneers. In the 1997 preseason game against the Atlanta Falcons, Ingram suffered a broken tibia and was placed on season-ending injured reserve. On August 30, 1998, he was released by the team. On December 3, Ingram was signed to the practice squad.

=== Jacksonville Jaguars ===
On January 19, 1999, Ingram was signed by the Jacksonville Jaguars off the Buccaneers' practice squad. He was active in eight games in the 1999 season, including both playoff games. On February 22, 2000, Ingram was re-signed by the team. On August 27, he was waived after he was out with a tendon injury.

=== Los Angeles Xtreme ===
On October 29, 2000, Ingram was selected in the 11th round, with the 81st overall selection, by the Los Angeles Xtreme in the 2001 XFL draft. He was released before playing a game with the team.
