= Trent Dilfer =

American football player, analyst, and coach (born 1972)

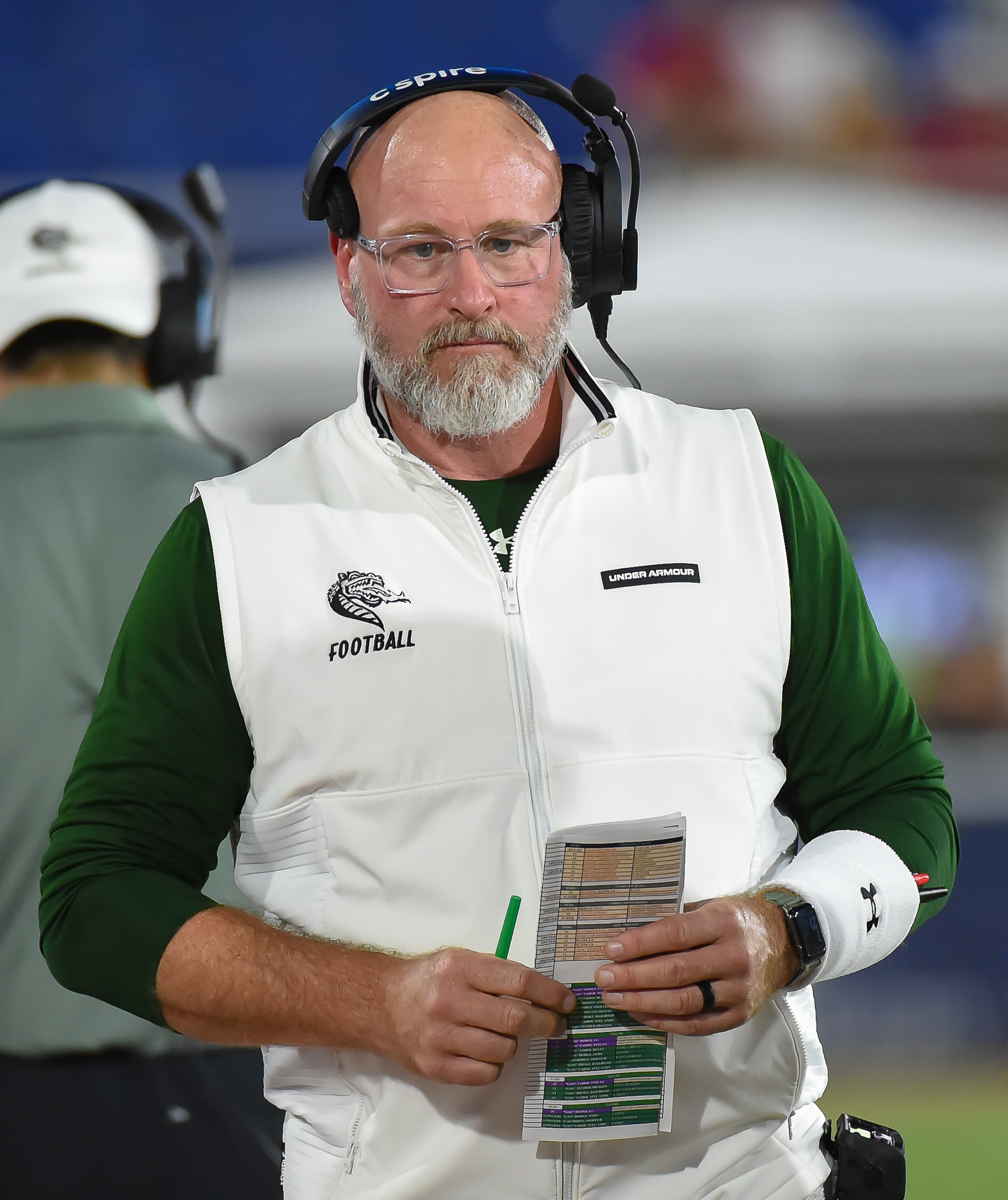
- Dilfer as head coach at UAB in 2025

No. 12, 8, 4
- Position: Quarterback

Personal information
- Born: March 13, 1972 (age 54); Santa Cruz, California, U.S.
- Listed height: 6 ft 3 in (1.91 m)
- Listed weight: 225 lb (102 kg)

Career information
- High school: Aptos (Aptos, California)
- College: Fresno State (1991–1993)
- NFL draft: 1994: 1st round, 6th overall pick

Career history

Playing
- Tampa Bay Buccaneers (1994–1999); Baltimore Ravens (2000); Seattle Seahawks (2001–2004); Cleveland Browns (2005); San Francisco 49ers (2006–2007)

Coaching
- Lipscomb Academy (TN) (2019–2022) Head coach; UAB (2023–2025) Head coach; Lipscomb Academy (TN) (2026–present) Head coach

Awards and highlights
- As a player: Super Bowl champion (XXXV); Pro Bowl (1997); Sammy Baugh Trophy (1993); First-team All-American (1993); WAC Offensive Player of the Year (1993); 2× First-team All-WAC (1992, 1993); NFL record: Longest passing completion in playoffs: 96

Career NFL statistics
- Passing attempts: 3,172
- Passing completions: 1,759
- Completion percentage: 55.5%
- TD–INT: 113–129
- Passing yards: 20,518
- Passer rating: 70.2
- Rushing yards: 853
- Rushing touchdowns: 5
- Stats at Pro Football Reference

Head coaching record
- Career: NCAA: 9–21 (.300)

Trent Farris Dilfer (born March 13, 1972) is an American football coach and former quarterback who played in the National Football League (NFL) for 14 seasons. Dilfer achieved his greatest professional success as the starting quarterback of the Baltimore Ravens during their Super Bowl-winning season in 2000. Following his playing career, he served as the head coach for the UAB Blazers from 2023 to 2025.

Dilfer played college football for the Fresno State Bulldogs, winning the Sammy Baugh Trophy in 1993. He was selected sixth overall by the Tampa Bay Buccaneers in the 1994 NFL draft. Dilfer spent his first six seasons with Tampa Bay, earning Pro Bowl honors in 1997, but was released due to inconsistent play. He signed with the Ravens in 2000 as a backup before becoming the team's starter midway through the year, which concluded with the franchise's first Super Bowl victory in Super Bowl XXXV. Despite the championship, Dilfer was not re-signed by the Ravens, becoming the first starting quarterback to be released after a Super Bowl win. His next four seasons were spent primarily as a backup with the Seattle Seahawks and he had stints with the Cleveland Browns and the San Francisco 49ers before retiring in 2008.

Shortly after announcing his retirement, Dilfer was hired by ESPN as an NFL analyst, a position he held until 2017. He is also the head coach of the quarterback camp Elite 11. In 2023, Dilfer was named the head coach of the Blazers, but was fired during his third season.

== Early life ==
Dilfer attended Aptos High School in Aptos, California, where he earned first team All-County honors as a free safety.

== College career ==
Dilfer attended Fresno State, starting at quarterback for 2 1/2 seasons. Dilfer helped Fresno State win or share the conference title for three straight seasons and started in two bowl games. In his junior season, Dilfer led the nation in pass efficiency en route to being named the WAC Offensive Player of the Year. He also set the NCAA record for consecutive pass attempts without an interception (271). That stood until 2007, when Kentucky quarterback Andre' Woodson broke it. Dilfer then declared himself eligible for the 1994 NFL draft, forgoing his senior season. He also won the Sammy Baugh Trophy for top collegiate passer.

== Professional career ==
Pre-draft measurables
Height	Weight	Arm length	Hand span	Wonderlic
6 ft 3 1/4 in (1.91 m)	228 lb (103 kg)	32 1/4 in (0.82 m)	9 5/8 in (0.24 m)	22
All values from NFL Combine

=== Tampa Bay Buccaneers ===
Dilfer's professional football career began when he was drafted by the Tampa Bay Buccaneers with their first pick in the 1994 NFL Draft (sixth overall, and the second quarterback taken in the draft, after Heath Shuler and ahead of Perry Klein) after his junior season at Fresno State. When the Indianapolis Colts passed on Dilfer in the draft in favor of linebacker Trev Alberts, ESPN Draft expert Mel Kiper, Jr. heavily criticized their decision. This led to Colts GM Bill Tobin responding on television by asking "Who in the hell is Mel Kiper" and challenged Kiper's credentials to evaluate the draft. This exchange is often shown as one of the classic moments of ESPN draft coverage.

Enlisted as the starter in his second year, after seeing spot duty in his rookie year, Dilfer struggled during what was still a dark period for the Buccaneers as a whole, when in 1995 he threw only 4 touchdown passes but 18 interceptions. The following year, he showed moderate improvement by upping his touchdown production, but failed to improve his turnover numbers (recording a career-high 19).

The following season, a year that Tampa's offense was aided by the arrival of rookie Warrick Dunn and the emergence of Mike Alstott, Dilfer was the first Tampa Bay quarterback to ever go to the Pro Bowl, which some say was a reward for a highly efficient season in the Buccaneers' limited offense. In the first 12 games of that year Dilfer passed for 2213 yards, 19 touchdowns and five interceptions. However, Dilfer's performance was perceived to decline in his last four games. In the playoffs, the Buccaneers defeated their NFC Central rivals, the Detroit Lions, before losing to their long-time division rivals, and defending Super Bowl champions, the Green Bay Packers. While with the Bucs, he won more games than any quarterback in franchise history and took the team to their first playoff game in 15 years.

In a 1995 game against Minnesota at the Metrodome, Dilfer was ejected for throwing a punch at Vikings defensive lineman John Randle, making him only the second NFL quarterback to be ejected from a game (Fran Tarkenton of the Vikings was the first quarterback to be ejected after he was thrown out of a 1974 game against the New England Patriots, which coincidentally also took place in Minnesota).

Dilfer threw for 21 touchdowns with the Tampa Bay Buccaneers in both the 1997 and the 1998 NFL seasons. In the 1996–1999 NFL seasons, with the Tampa Bay Buccaneers, Dilfer averaged 2,729 yards a season and had a total of 58 touchdowns. His inconsistent play continued and in Week 10 of 1999, he was injured severely, missing the rest of the season. In 76 games as a starter for Tampa Bay, he went 38-38, with his wins being the most for a Buccaneer quarterback.

=== Baltimore Ravens ===
Dilfer signed with the Ravens on March 8, 2000, and became the backup for Tony Banks. After two straight losses and four straight weeks without an offensive touchdown, the Ravens replaced Banks with Dilfer. The Ravens would lose their third straight game and fail to score a touchdown for the fifth straight week. It would be the last time the Ravens would lose a game that season, or go without a touchdown. The Ravens finished the season winning seven straight to earn a wild card berth at 12–4. The 7–1 run also gave Dilfer a 45–39 record as a starter at that point.

During the playoffs, Dilfer went 3–0, and the Ravens advanced to Super Bowl XXXV in Tampa, Florida to meet the New York Giants. The Ravens won their first Super Bowl title in a 34–7 blowout, which saw Dilfer complete 12 of 25 passes for 153 yards and one touchdown. Although one of Dilfer's passes was intercepted by linebacker Jessie Armstead and returned for a touchdown, the play was negated due to a holding penalty against the Giants. The Los Angeles Times described Dilfer as a game manager quarterback for the Ravens that season: He "wasn't elite, but he didn't make costly mistakes, and was supported by a dominant defense." Dilfer wasn't re-signed by the Ravens, making him the only quarterback to be let go after winning a Super Bowl.

Dilfer acknowledged that he still felt bitter about the Ravens moving on from him in a 2021 interview, noting he played through injury during the season, most notably in his shoulder, alongside osteitis pubis, an inflammation near the pubic bone and hip flexor muscle. He also criticized his successor, Elvis Grbac, who posted lower statistics with the Ravens.

=== Seattle Seahawks ===
On August 3, 2001, the Seattle Seahawks signed Dilfer as a backup quarterback to starter Matt Hasselbeck. Dilfer saw his first action when Hasselbeck injured his groin in week three against the Oakland Raiders. Dilfer started and won the next two games, before being replaced by a healthy Hasselbeck. Dilfer came on in a relief role against the Washington Redskins, when Hasselbeck struggled. He continued as the starter when Hasselbeck suffered a separated left shoulder. Dilfer started the final two games of the season, and with Seattle in the playoff hunt, won them both. He ended the season by throwing five touchdowns and two interceptions in two three-point victories. The Seahawks' AFC (they were still in the AFC in 2001) wild-card hopes ended when the Ravens (Dilfer's former team the year before) beat the Minnesota Vikings 19–3 on Monday Night Football. At the end of the season, Dilfer's passer rating was 92.0 and he had won 15 straight starts with a 4–0 record with Seattle.

Partially because the Seattle Seahawks' starting quarterback, Hasselbeck, was coming off a season where he went 5–7 as a starter and threw eight interceptions and seven touchdowns, Dilfer was re-signed by the team to a four-year deal on March 1, and was slated as the starter heading into training camp. However, in an exhibition game against Indianapolis, Dilfer sprained his medial collateral ligament in his right knee. With the injury, Dilfer lost the starting job to Hasselbeck. Dilfer returned to the starting position against the Arizona Cardinals with a Week 2 13–24 loss. On October 28, 2002, in Week 8, he suffered a season-ending torn Achilles tendon against the Dallas Cowboys on the synthetic turf at Texas Stadium. At that point in the season, the Seahawks were 2–5. Following the season, he received the Bart Starr Award.

In 2003, Dilfer played sparingly in a relief role and was primarily used to mentor Hasselbeck, while also receiving the Seahawks' Steve Largent Award.

In 2004, Dilfer started in only two games, and won them both: November 28 versus the Miami Dolphins, 24–17, and December 26 versus the Arizona Cardinals, 24–21.

Hasselbeck and Dilfer remain close friends since their time together in Seattle.

=== Cleveland Browns ===
In March 2005, Dilfer was traded to the Cleveland Browns where it was hoped he would mentor rookie quarterback Charlie Frye. Naming Dilfer the starting quarterback for the 2005 NFL season, the idea was to work Frye into the lineup under the veteran's tutelage, but a behind-the-scenes dispute with then-offensive coordinator Maurice Carthon resulted in Dilfer's wanting out of Cleveland almost immediately. In his lone season for the Browns, Dilfer passed for 2,321 yards and 11 touchdowns, throwing 12 interceptions and fumbling 9 times (losing 7 of those). His passer rating was 76.9. He did however have the highest completion percentage of his career at 59.8 percent. The Browns would fall to 6–10.

=== San Francisco 49ers ===
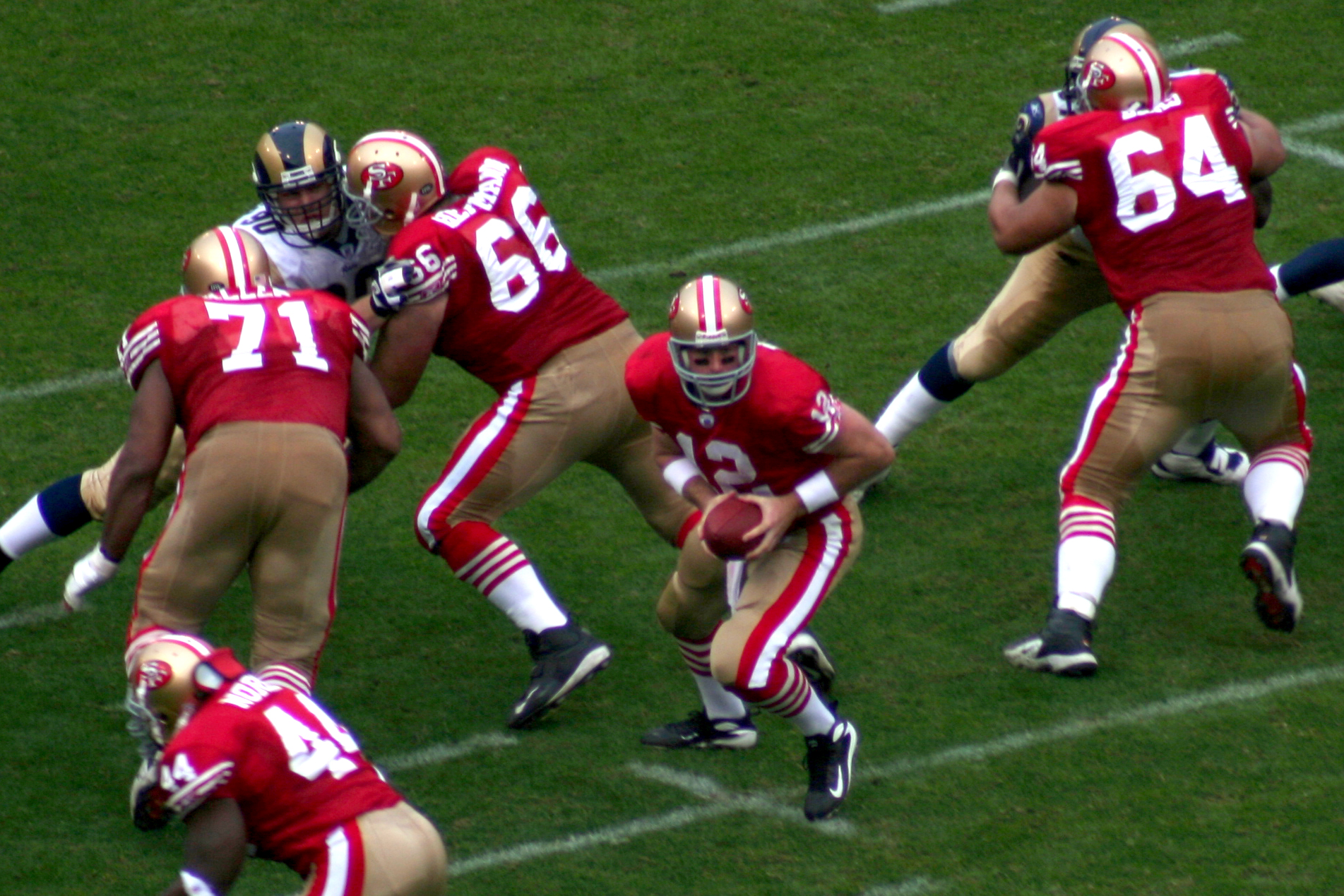
Dilfer taking the snap in 2007

In May 2006, Dilfer was traded to the San Francisco 49ers, this time to serve as a mentor to the 2005 first round draft pick Alex Smith. In return, the 49ers gave the Browns Ken Dorsey and a 7th round pick in the 2007 NFL draft. A close friend of former 49ers quarterback John Brodie, Dilfer received permission from Brodie and the 49ers to wear his retired number 12 in support of Brodie eventually going into the Pro Football Hall of Fame.

On September 30, 2007, Dilfer took over from Alex Smith following Smith's grade three shoulder separation. He would go on to start for the 49ers in games against the Seahawks, Ravens and Giants before conceding the starting spot back to Smith. However, with Smith's effectiveness in question coming back from injury, coach Mike Nolan announced on November 14, 2007, that Dilfer would be the starting quarterback. Dilfer would go on to start in games against the Rams, in victory over the Cardinals in overtime, and against the Panthers. On December 9 in a home game against the Vikings, Dilfer suffered a head injury resulting in a concussion while diving for a 1st down on 4th and 2 that took him out of the game and subsequently the season. He was succeeded by third string backup Shaun Hill.

=== Retirement ===
Dilfer officially announced his retirement on July 9, 2008. Although he had suffered an Achilles tendon injury playing basketball earlier in the off-season with his wife, Dilfer stated that he was planning to retire anyway.

In 2009, Dilfer was inducted into the Fresno County Athletic Hall of Fame.

== Career statistics ==
Legend
	Won the Super Bowl
**Bold**	Career high

=== NFL ===
==== Regular season ====
Year	Team	Games			Passing								Rushing				Sacked		Fumbles	
Year	Team	GP	GS	Record	Cmp	Att	Pct	Yds	Y/A	TD	Int	Rtg	Att	Yds	Y/A	TD	Sck	SckY	Fum	Lost
1994	TB	5	2	0–2	38	82	46.3	433	5.3	1	6	36.3	2	27	**13.5**	0	8	42	2	1
1995	TB	16	16	7–9	224	415	54.0	2,774	6.7	4	18	60.1	23	115	5.0	**2**	**47**	**331**	**13**	**6**
1996	TB	16	16	6–10	**267**	**482**	55.4	**2,859**	5.9	12	**19**	64.8	32	124	3.9	0	28	207	10	4
1997	TB	16	16	10–6	217	386	56.2	2,555	6.6	**21**	11	82.8	33	99	3.0	1	32	196	9	1
1998	TB	16	16	8–8	225	429	52.4	2,729	6.4	**21**	15	74.0	**40**	141	3.5	**2**	27	172	9	5
1999	TB	10	10	7–3	146	244	**59.8**	1,619	6.6	11	11	75.8	35	**144**	4.1	0	26	189	6	5
2000	BAL	11	8	7–1	134	226	59.3	1,502	6.6	12	11	76.6	20	75	3.8	0	23	135	8	2
2001	SEA	6	4	4–0	73	122	**59.8**	1,014	**8.3**	7	4	**92.0**	11	17	1.5	0	10	72	3	0
2002	SEA	6	6	2–4	94	168	56.0	1,182	7.0	4	6	71.1	10	27	2.7	0	7	36	2	1
2003	SEA	5	0	—	4	8	50.0	31	3.9	1	1	59.9	2	–1	–0.5	0	1	8	2	1
2004	SEA	5	2	2–0	25	58	43.1	333	5.7	1	3	46.1	10	14	1.4	0	4	21	1	0
2005	CLE	11	11	4–7	199	333	**59.8**	2,321	7.0	11	12	76.9	20	46	2.3	0	23	139	9	5
2006	SF	0	0	DNP																
2007	SF	7	6	1–5	113	219	51.6	1,166	5.3	7	12	55.1	10	25	2.5	0	27	182	8	0
Career		130	113	58–55	1,759	3,172	55.5	20,518	6.5	113	129	70.2	248	853	3.4	5	263	1,730	82	31

==== Postseason ====
Year	Team	Games			Passing								Rushing				Sacked		Fumbles	
Year	Team	GP	GS	Record	Cmp	Att	Pct	Yds	Y/A	TD	Int	Rtg	Att	Yds	Y/A	TD	Sck	SckY	Fum	Lost
1997	TB	2	2	1–1	24	62	38.7	381	6.1	1	**3**	45.2	2	0	0.0	0	4	33	0	0
1999	TB	0	0	DNP																
2000	BAL	4	4	4–0	**35**	**73**	**47.9**	**590**	**8.1**	**3**	1	**83.7**	**13**	**7**	**0.5**	0	**10**	**82**	**3**	0
2003	SEA	0	0	DNP																
2004	SEA	0	0	DNP																
Career		6	6	5–1	59	135	43.7	971	7.2	4	4	66.0	15	7	0.5	0	14	115	3	0

=== College ===
Season	Team	Passing						Rushing	
Season	Team	Cmp	Att	Yds	TD	Int	QB rating	Yds	TD
1991	Fresno State	69	109	832	2	3	128.0	**177**	0
1992	Fresno State	188	360	3,000	21	**14**	133.7	90	**2**
1993	Fresno State	**254**	**396**	**3,799**	**30**	5	**167.2**	—	1
Career		442	754	6,799	51	19	151.2	–	3

== Broadcasting ==
Dilfer joined the NFL Network as a guest analyst in 2006. On September 15, 2007, he appeared on the NFL Network's pregame show. He was the NFL Network's color analyst for the 2008 Senior Bowl as well as a studio analyst during the 2008 NFL playoffs. On July 14, 2008, Dilfer signed on as an NFL analyst for ESPN. He joined Brad Nessler to call the second game of the network's Monday Night Football doubleheader on September 13 of that year. During his tenure with ESPN Dilfer presented a segment called "Dilfer's Dimes", which featured highlight passes. ESPN dismissed Dilfer in a cost-cutting move in April 2017, replacing him with Rex Ryan.

Dilfer also was a football analyst for Fox Sports 1, appearing regularly on The Herd with Colin Cowherd.

== Coaching career ==
In 2019, Dilfer became head football coach at Lipscomb Academy in Nashville, Tennessee. In his first year, the team went 5–5 and got knocked out in the semifinals. The next season in 2020, Dilfer went 8–2 and led the Lipscomb Academy Mustangs to the 2020 Division II Class AA State Championship game against CPA (Christ Presbyterian Academy). They played the championship game on December 3, 2020, in Cookeville, TN, at Tennessee Tech University. The Mustangs lost 35–28. In 2021, the Mustangs finished 13–1, including one win by forfeit, and defeated Christ Presbyterian Academy, 27–0, in the Division II Class AA State Championship game. In 2022, the Mustangs finished 13-0 and again defeated Christ Presbyterian Academy with a score of 42–0 to win their second straight Division II Class AA State Championship.

On November 30, 2022, Dilfer was named the head football coach of the University of Alabama at Birmingham (UAB), his first coaching job of any type at the collegiate level. UAB fired Dilfer on October 12, 2025. Dilfer's record at the time was 9–21. Alex Mortensen succeeded him as interim head coach.

== Head coaching record ==
=== College ===
Year	Team	Overall	Conference	Standing	Bowl/playoffs
UAB Blazers (American Athletic Conference / American Conference) (2023–2025)
2023	UAB	4–8	3–5	T–8th	
2024	UAB	3–9	2–6	T–11th	
2025	UAB	2–4 (Note: UAB fired Dilfer after six games)	0–3		
UAB:		9–21	5–14		
Total:		9–21			

=== High school ===
Dilfer recorded a total record of 44-10 as high school coach of Lipscomb Academy in Nashville, Tennessee.

Lipscomb Academy Mustangs
Year	Team	Overall record	Conference record	Conference standing
2019	Lipscomb Academy	7-6	2-2	3rd
2020	Lipscomb Academy	11-3	4-0	1st
2021	Lipscomb Academy	13-1	5-0	1st
2022	Lipscomb Academy	13-0	5-0	1st

== Personal life ==
Dilfer resides with his family in Birmingham, Alabama. He is married to Cassandra Dilfer, a former Fresno State swimmer, and they have four children together.

Their only son, Trevin, died of heart disease at the age of five on April 27, 2003. On June 2, 2003, Dilfer made his first public comments regarding his family's loss and, still grieving, openly wept. Aptos High School, Dilfer's alma mater, named their football field Trevin Dilfer Field.

All three surviving daughters are or were college volleyball setters—the oldest, Maddie, played at Notre Dame and Pepperdine; middle daughter Tori played at TCU and Louisville; and youngest daughter, Delaney, completed her freshman season at Lipscomb in 2021 before going on to have a successful volleyball setting career at Liberty University.

On a broadcast of the Cardinals and Titans preseason game in 2012, Dilfer admitted he weighed 265 lbs and was drinking himself to sleep during his tenure with the Seahawks, he reflected that this was related to losing his son and that Matt Hasselbeck helped him recover.

Dilfer is a Christian, in a 1998 interview with Sports Spectrum he shared: “Trent Dilfer has been saved by Jesus Christ. And all of that other stuff really doesn’t matter. That’s where my value comes from, and that’s why I can handle being criticized in the media. That’s why I can handle people calling radio shows and lying about me. That’s why I can handle some of the adverse situations I face, and that’s why I can handle success.”

== See also ==
- List of NCAA major college football yearly passing leaders
