= Horace Copeland =

American football player (born 1971)

No. 88, 80
- Position: Wide receiver

Personal information
- Born: January 2, 1971 (age 55); Orlando, Florida, U.S.
- Listed height: 6 ft 3 in (1.91 m)
- Listed weight: 200 lb (91 kg)

Career information
- High school: Maynard Evans (Orlando)
- College: Miami (FL)
- NFL draft: 1993: 4th round, 104th overall pick

Career history
- Tampa Bay Buccaneers (1993–1997); Miami Dolphins (1998); Tampa Bay Buccaneers (1998); Oakland Raiders (1999)

Awards and highlights
- 2× National champion (1989, 1991)

Career NFL statistics
- Receptions: 115
- Receiving yards: 1,977
- Receiving touchdowns: 7
- Stats at Pro Football Reference

Horace Cornellius Copeland (born January 2, 1971) is an American former professional football player who played wide receiver for seven seasons for the Tampa Bay Buccaneers, Miami Dolphins and Oakland Raiders. Copeland was selected in the fourth round of the 1993 NFL draft.

Copeland is a graduate of Maynard Evans High School in Orlando, Florida, where he also established state records in the high jump and long jump. His high school made it to the 6A Football State Championship, which helped him earn a scholarship to the University of Miami, where he played until his graduation.

Throughout his playing career in the NFL, Copeland frequently celebrated touchdowns by performing a backflip.

Copeland was also an accomplished long jumper for the Miami Hurricanes track and field team, placing 5th and earning All American status at the 1992 NCAA Division I Outdoor Track and Field Championships.
