= Lonnie Marts =

American football player (born 1968)

Lonnie Marts Jr
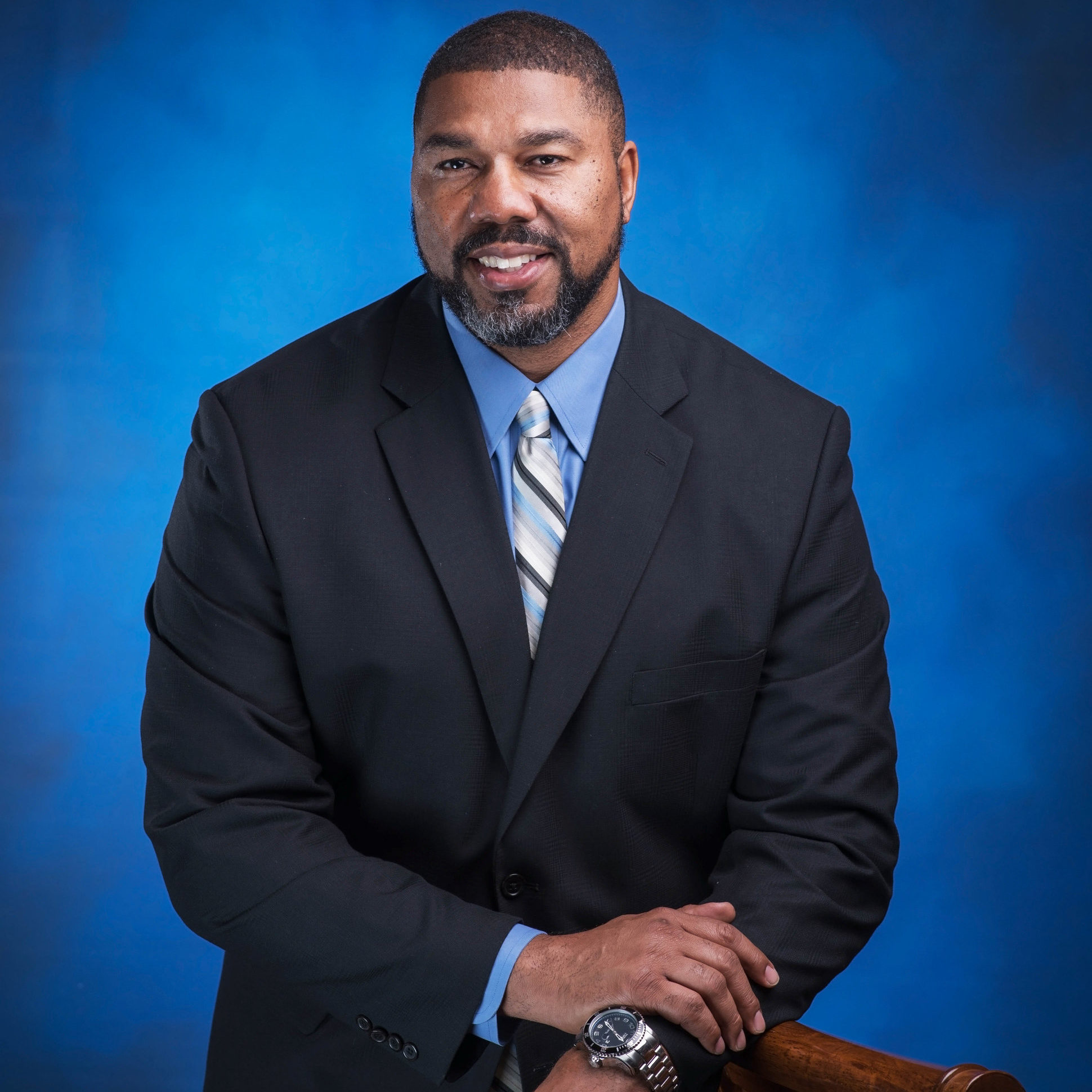

No. 51, 55, 56, 58
- Position: Linebacker

Personal information
- Born: November 10, 1968 (age 57); New Orleans, Louisiana, U.S.
- Listed height: 6 ft 2 in (1.88 m)
- Listed weight: 246 lb (112 kg)

Career information
- High school: St. Augustine (New Orleans)
- College: Tulane
- NFL draft: 1990: undrafted

Career history
- Kansas City Chiefs (1990–1993); Tampa Bay Buccaneers (1994–1996); Tennessee Oilers (1997–1998); Jacksonville Jaguars (1999–2000)

Awards and highlights
- NFL forced fumbles leader (1993)

Career NFL statistics
- Tackles: 520
- Sacks: 17
- Passes defended: 1
- Interceptions: 5
- Forced fumbles: 16
- Fumble recoveries: 12
- Defensive touchdowns: 2
- Stats at Pro Football Reference

Lonnie Marts Jr. (born November 10, 1968) is an American former professional football player who was a linebacker for 10 seasons in the National Football League (NFL). He played college football for the Tulane Green Wave. He currently resides in Jacksonville, Florida and is the Chief Executive Officer & Director of a 501c(3)b, non-profit organization.

== Career ==
Marts began his NFL career as a free agent from Tulane University where he had a position as a safety, despite his large frame. In 1991, he was discovered by Tony Dungy and signed with the Kansas City Chiefs. He later played with the Tampa Bay Buccaneers from 1994 to 1996. Many believe that during this time is when he was at his best performance. He later played with the Tennessee Oilers and started 15 games with the team until 1998. In 1999, Lonnie played with the Jacksonville Jaguars and replaced the injured Bryce Paup. He retired with the Jaguars in 2000.

In 2020 Marts founded Level the Playing Field Leadership Academy (LPFLA), a nonprofit organization in Jacksonville, FL.

== Leadership roles ==
2002–2014 – Created Godspeed Sports Performance which trained athletes.

2010–2020 – Served as the Athletic Director & Head Coach at Harvest Community School.

Between these roles, Marts coached a number of high school players to the Division 1 college level.

== Personal life ==
He is married to Gionne Taylor Marts, and they have five children.
