= Jerry Ellison =

American football player (born 1971)

No. 37, 35
- Position: Running back

Personal information
- Born: December 20, 1971 (age 54); Augusta, Georgia, U.S.
- Listed height: 5 ft 10 in (1.78 m)
- Listed weight: 204 lb (93 kg)

Career information
- High school: Glenn Hills (Augusta)
- College: Chattanooga
- NFL draft: 1994: undrafted

Career history
- Tampa Bay Buccaneers (1994–1998); New England Patriots (1999); Tampa Bay Buccaneers (2000)*
- * Offseason or practice squad member only

Career NFL statistics
- Rushing yards: 368
- Rushing average: 5
- Receptions: 30
- Receiving yards: 310
- Total touchdowns: 5
- Stats at Pro Football Reference

Jerry Ellison (born December 20, 1971) is an American former professional football player who was a running back for five seasons with the Tampa Bay Buccaneers and New England Patriots of the National Football League (NFL). He played college football for the Chattanooga Mocs.
