= Pete Pierson =

American football player (born 1971)

No. 69
- Position: Offensive tackle

Personal information
- Born: February 4, 1971 (age 55); Portland, Oregon, U.S.
- Listed height: 6 ft 6 in (1.98 m)
- Listed weight: 303 lb (137 kg)

Career information
- High school: David Douglas (Portland)
- College: Washington
- NFL draft: 1994: 5th round, 136th overall pick

Career history
- Kansas City Chiefs (1994)*; Tampa Bay Buccaneers (1994–2001); Indianapolis Colts (2002)
- * Offseason or practice squad member only

Awards and highlights
- National champion (1991); Second-team All-Pac-10 (1993); Hula Bowl (1994)

Career NFL statistics
- Games played: 102
- Games started: 21
- Fumble recoveries: 1
- Stats at Pro Football Reference

Peter Samuel Pierson (born February 4, 1971) is an American former professional football player who was an offensive tackle for eight seasons with the Tampa Bay Buccaneers and one for the Indianapolis Colts of the National Football League (NFL). He played college football for the Washington Huskies and was selected by the Buccaneers in the fifth round of the 1994 NFL draft.

Pierson was released by the Buccaneers as a rookie in 1994, and was signed by the Kansas City Chiefs. After spending approximately one week one the Chiefs practice squad, he was subsequently re-signed by the Bucs. He remained with the Bucs for the season, but did not play in any games (spending part of the time was on the Bucs' practice squad).

Pierson spent the 1995 season as a backup right tackle (12 games, four starts), but moved mainly to the left side when the Bucs hired Tony Dungy in 1996. Playing behind one of the NFL's upper echelon left tackles, Paul Gruber, Pierson played in 57 games with two starts from 1996 to 1999.

When Gruber suffered a broken left leg in the season finale of the 1999 season, Pierson started the Bucs' playoff contests versus the Washington Redskins and the NFC Championship game versus the St. Louis Rams. He started 15 games in 2000 at left tackle.

In 2001, Pierson shared time in 15 games at left tackle. Pierson was released by the Bucs in August 2002. He signed with Dungy and the Indianapolis Colts, and appeared in two games as a reserve in his final NFL season.

In his nine-year career, Pierson appeared in 121 games and made 21 starts.
