= Rich McKay =

American football executive (born 1959)

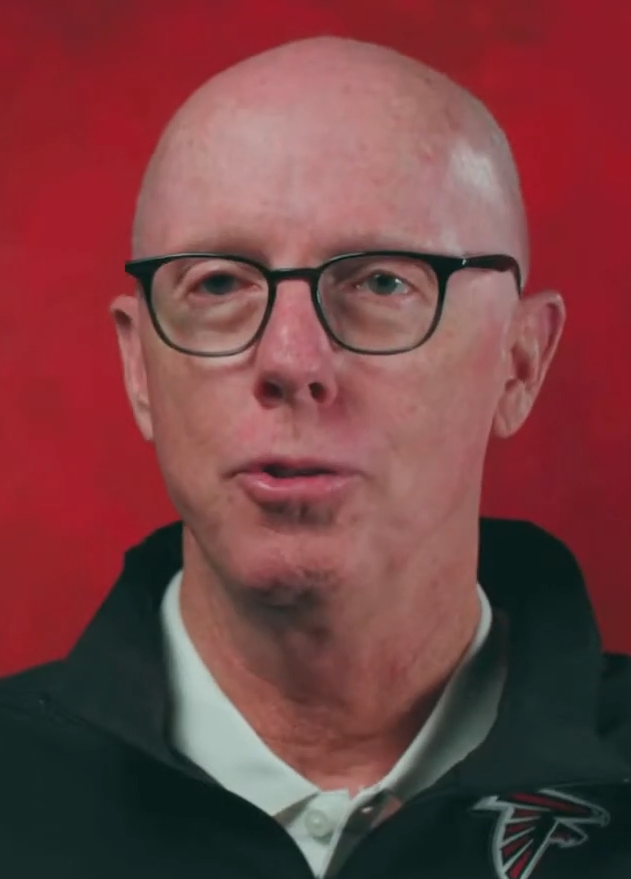
- McKay with the Atlanta Falcons in 2024

Personal information
- Born: March 16, 1959 (age 67); Eugene, Oregon, U.S.

Career information
- High school: Jesuit High School of Tampa
- University: Princeton University (BA); Stetson University (JD)

Career history
- Tampa Bay Buccaneers (1992–1993) Vice president of football administration; Tampa Bay Buccaneers (1994–2003) General manager; Atlanta Falcons (2003–2008) General manager; Atlanta Falcons (2008–2022) President/CEO; Atlanta Falcons (2023–2025) CEO

Awards and highlights
- Super Bowl champion (XXXVII)

Richard James McKay (born March 16, 1959) is an American football executive who was CEO of the Atlanta Falcons of the National Football League (NFL). Prior to joining the Falcons, he was the general manager of the Tampa Bay Buccaneers from 1994 to 2003.

== Early life ==
McKay is the youngest son of the late John McKay, who was the Buccaneers' first head coach. McKay was a ball boy for the Buccaneers when his father was the head coach. While his father was head coach at USC in Los Angeles, McKay played wide receiver, with quarterback Paul McDonald, at Bishop Amat High School in La Puente, California. When John McKay took the Tampa Bay job he moved his family, including son Rich, to Florida where McKay played quarterback his senior year at Jesuit High School of Tampa the 1976–1977 season. He earned his bachelor's degree from Princeton University in 1981 and graduated from Stetson University College of Law in 1984. Prior to entering the NFL, McKay was an attorney with the Tampa law firm of Hill, Ward, and Henderson. He and his wife, Terrin, have two sons, Hunter and John. John is currently the assistant general manager of the Los Angeles Rams.

== Professional career ==
=== Tampa Bay Buccaneers ===
On November 8, 1994, McKay was promoted by the Tampa Bay Buccaneers (as run by a trust set up after the death of Hugh Culverhouse earlier in the year) to serve as general manager. McKay had served as the vice president of football administration since 1992 and had been a member of the NFL's Competition Committee since being appointed earlier in 1994. The tasks granted to him involved a bigger role in supervising the personnel departments in the college and pros for Tampa alongside more input in drafting and free agency (as opposed to having in the hands of head coach Sam Wyche), complete with final word on drafting. This differed from the traditional setup used by Culverhouse as owner, in which the coach would generally have control (Wyche would retain the position of coach and director of football operations).

On December 27, 1995, McKay fired Wyche as coach, stating that the team was better off than they were when they hired Wyche (McKay called it a mutually agreed decision while Wyche called it a firing). On January 23, 1996, McKay hired Tony Dungy (who had interviewed for the position four years prior) as head coach. The decision came after the Glazers had first pushed for Steve Spurrier; once that failed, they focused their efforts on Dungy, until he came aboard. The 1997 team improved from six wins to ten while qualifying for the playoffs for the first time since 1982, which included a 5–0 start and a Wild Card playoff win against Detroit for their first playoff game victory since 1979. They regressed the following year but bounced back in 1999 with eleven wins and a NFC Central title, the first since 1981, doing so on the efforts of rookie quarterback Shaun King after incumbent quarterback Trent Dilfer was hurt. They made it all the way to the NFC Championship game, which they lost 11–6 to the St. Louis Rams.

During his tenure as general manager, McKay drafted players such as Warren Sapp, Mike Alstott, Ronde Barber, Derrick Brooks, and Warrick Dunn. McKay constructed the 2002 Buccaneers' Super Bowl-winning roster that featured seven Pro Bowl players. The Buccaneers' 41 Pro Bowl selections between 1997 through 2002 were the most in the NFL. In 1998, McKay, then president and general manager of the Tampa Bay Buccaneers, worked closely with the Glazer Family, the city of Tampa, former Tampa Mayor Dick Greco, and Tampa Stadium Authority on the successful construction and opening of Raymond James Stadium. Both Sapp and Brooks, selected by McKay in the same first round of the 1995 NFL draft, went on to become members of the Pro Football Hall of Fame. Sapp was enshrined in 2013 and Brooks was inducted in 2014. According to the Pro Football Hall of Fame, McKay is the only general manager in NFL history to have his first two draft picks as a GM be inducted into the Hall of Fame.

On January 14, 2002, Dungy was fired, against the wishes of McKay, after a second straight lopsided loss to the Philadelphia Eagles in the Wild Card round. Bill Parcells was offered the position by the team (as coveted by the Glazers) but backed out of the agreement; McKay had been asked to take the position of team president if Parcells was named coach in favor of Mike Tannenbaum being the new general manager. McKay then interviewed three coaches with Marvin Lewis, Mike Mularkey, and Norv Turner before he had his mind set on Lewis. So confident was McKay that he started to help Lewis assemble a coaching staff before a face-to-face meeting between Lewis and the Glazers resulted in rejection and a move to push for Gruden (eventually, the team traded two first round picks, two second-round picks, plus $8 million, to the Oakland Raiders, in exchange for Gruden). Rejecting a contract extension offer, McKay considered leaving the organization during that time but did not.

Despite the Super Bowl victory, McKay and Gruden did not get along. Gruden's suggestions on free agents such as Emmitt Smith were rejected by McKay, while Gruden reportedly went over McKay's rejection to deactivate Keyshawn Johnson to appeal directly to the Glazer family. On December 12, 2003, McKay and the Buccaneers came to an agreement that would see McKay leave the organization with the freedom to join any team he wanted, with no compensation required.

As the general manager for the Buccaneers from 1994 to 2003, McKay directed five teams that reached the NFC playoffs and one team that won a Super Bowl title.

=== Atlanta Falcons ===
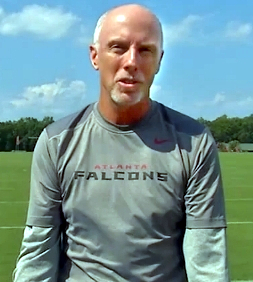
McKay in 2014

In December 2003, McKay left the Tampa Bay Buccaneers to become president and general manager of the Atlanta Falcons. In his first season of directing operations, the Falcons went to the NFC Championship game against the Philadelphia Eagles. In January 2008, the Falcons hired Thomas Dimitroff as general manager, as McKay ascended to the position of team president, although McKay negotiated Matt Ryan's contract. McKay's Falcons in 2010–11 had 9 Pro Bowlers.

Sixteen years after building Raymond James Stadium in Tampa, McKay, as president and CEO of the Atlanta Falcons, worked closely with Falcons Chairman and owner Arthur Blank, the city of Atlanta, and the Georgia World Congress Center stadium authority to secure approval and financing for the Falcons to build a new $1.2 billion stadium in downtown Atlanta. The Falcons broke ground on the new building on May 19, 2014, and the stadium, known as Mercedes Benz Stadium, opened on August 26, 2017.

McKay is believed to be the only current NFL executive who has been the point person for the negotiation and construction of two NFL stadiums.

On January 9, 2023, McKay's position with the Atlanta Falcons was adjusted to CEO. Greg Beadles was selected to take over as president. McKay remains in charge of football operations while Beadles operates the business side.

McKay was announced as one of 25 candidates in The Pro Football Hall of Fame's contributor category for the Class of 2025 on Oct. 16, 2024.

Following the 2025 season, McKay was let go from the Atlanta Falcons, with Greg Beadles moving into McKay's former CEO role. McKay would still be a part of the NFL Competition Committee and Arthur Blank's company, Arthur M. Blank Sport and Entertainment.

=== NFL committees ===
McKay is the longest standing member in the history of the NFL Competition Committee (30 consecutive years, 26 in the chairmanship role), making him one of the more influential executives in the league.

McKay was on the NFL Management Council Working Group of League executives that helps advise on collective bargaining issues. During the 2011 NFL lockout, McKay helped in negotiating a new collective bargaining agreement with the NFLPA. McKay is also a member of the NFL's Health & Safety Committee.

In April 2015, McKay was suspended from the Competition Committee by the NFL after the Falcons were found guilty of piping crowd noise into the Georgia Dome. McKay remained suspended for nearly five months before he was reinstated by the NFL. The Falcons were fined $350,000 and stripped of a 2016 fifth round draft pick for the two-year scheme.
