= Todd Scott (American football) =

American football player (born 1979)

No. 34
- Position: Running back

Personal information
- Born: January 23, 1968 (age 58); Galveston, Texas, U.S.
- Listed height: 5 ft 11 in (1.80 m)
- Listed weight: 200 lb (91 kg)

Career information
- High school: Ball (Galveston, Texas)
- College: Louisiana
- NFL draft: 1991: 6th round, 163rd overall pick

Career history
- Minnesota Vikings (1991–1994); New York Jets (1995); Tampa Bay Buccaneers (1995–1996); Kansas City Chiefs (1997)

Awards and highlights
- Pro Bowl (1992)

Career NFL statistics
- Tackles: 299
- Interceptions: 7
- Fumble recoveries: 2
- Stats at Pro Football Reference

Todd Scott (born January 23, 1968) is an American former professional football player who was a safety for four teams in the National Football League (NFL). He played college football for the Southwestern Louisiana Bulldogs and was selected by the Minnesota Vikings in the sixth round of the 1991 NFL draft with the 163rd overall pick. He went to the Pro Bowl after the 1992 season with the Vikings.
