= Demetrius DuBose =

American football player (1971–1999)

No. 93
- Position: Linebacker

Personal information
- Born: March 23, 1971; Seattle, Washington, U.S.
- Died: July 24, 1999 (aged 28); San Diego, California, U.S.
- Listed height: 6 ft 1 in (1.85 m)
- Listed weight: 235 lb (107 kg)

Career information
- High school: O'Dea (Seattle)
- College: Notre Dame
- NFL draft: 1993: 2nd round, 34th overall pick

Career history
- Tampa Bay Buccaneers (1993–1996); New York Jets (1997)*
- * Offseason or practice squad member only

Career NFL statistics
- Tackles: 63
- Forced fumbles: 1
- Stats at Pro Football Reference

Adolphus Demetrius DuBose (March 23, 1971 – July 24, 1999) was an American professional football linebacker in the National Football League (NFL).

== Playing career ==
DuBose attended the University of Notre Dame, where he was a starting linebacker for the Fighting Irish and a co-captain for the team his senior year. He graduated in 3.5 years, double majoring in finance and international business as well as earning All American status.

Dubose was selected by the Tampa Bay Buccaneers in the second round (34th pick overall) of the 1993 NFL draft. He was allowed to leave as a free agent and signed with the New York Jets in 1997. He was waived by the Jets only four months later.

== Life after football ==
During the off-season, he visited places such as Australia, New Zealand, and various countries in Europe. He also spent time in Vail, Colorado, tuning in his snowboarding skills. He worked for one winter for the Mammoth Mountain Ski Patrol. After football, he invested much of his football earnings in business ventures that were not very successful, including a line of sports clothing and a beach volleyball league. Dubose had aspirations of becoming a successful pro beach volleyball player and was on his way to achieving his goal.

== Death ==
DuBose was shot (13 times, 5 in the back) to death by two police officers, Timothy Keating and Robert Wills, in San Diego during a confrontation on July 24, 1999, after mistakenly entering a neighbors' house next door to the vacation rental he was staying at with friends in Pacific Beach. Although police were called, witnesses stated that the confusion had been resolved by the time police arrived on the scene. While detained by police to confirm his identity, he resisted and attempted to flee the scene. Although DuBose was shirtless and unarmed, police contended they had no choice but to protect themselves and others when the fatal shots were fired. DuBose was shot thirteen times, five in the back, by the two officers with their 9 mm handguns. The toxicology reports showed that he had traces of alcohol, cocaine and ecstasy in his system. He was 28.

The FBI and U.S. Attorney for the Southern District of California investigated the shooting and found that it was justified. In May 2000, "[t]he Citizens Review Board on Police Practices concluded that while the shooting was a justified use of deadly force under the department's guidelines, the two officers 'did not exercise sufficient discretion.'" In February 2003, a ten-person federal jury in a wrongful death suit found the officers to be not liable. His grave is located at Evergreen-Washelli Memorial Park in Seattle, Washington.

Filmmaker and former Notre Dame teammate John Kouris produced a documentary film about DuBose first screened in 2025 called Demetrius DuBose, All American.

== See also ==
- List of unarmed African Americans killed by law enforcement officers in the United States
