= Joel Crisman =

American football player (born 1971)

No. 68
- Position: Guard

Personal information
- Born: February 3, 1971 (age 55); Cherokee, Iowa, U.S.
- Listed height: 6 ft 5 in (1.96 m)
- Listed weight: 302 lb (137 kg)

Career information
- High school: Grundy Center (IA)
- College: USC
- NFL draft: 1994: undrafted

Career history
- Tampa Bay Buccaneers (1994–1996)
- Stats at Pro Football Reference

Joel Crisman (born February 3, 1971) is an American former professional football player who was a guard for the Tampa Bay Buccaneers of the National Football League (NFL). He played in nine games for the Buccaneers in 1996. He signed with the Bucs as a rookie free agent after playing college football for the USC Trojans in 1994. Crisman spent most of 1994 and 1995 on the club's injured list and practice squad.
