= 1999 Tampa Bay Buccaneers season =

NFL team season

- Owner: Malcolm Glazer
- General manager: Rich McKay
- Head coach: Tony Dungy
- Offensive coordinator: Mike Shula
- Defensive coordinator: Monte Kiffin
- Home stadium: Raymond James Stadium

Results
- Record: 11–5
- Division place: 1st NFC Central
- Playoffs: Won Divisional Playoffs (vs. Redskins) 14–13; Lost NFC Championship (at Rams) 6–11
- All-Pros: 5: FB Mike Alstott; LB Derrick Brooks; SS John Lynch; DT Warren Sapp; MLB Hardy Nickerson (alternate)
- Pro Bowlers: 6: FB Mike Alstott; LB Derrick Brooks; SS John Lynch; C Tony Mayberry; MLB Hardy Nickerson; DT Warren Sapp
- Team MVP: LB Derrick Brooks

The 1999 season was the Tampa Bay Buccaneers' 24th in the National Football League (NFL). The season began with the team trying to improve on an 8–8 season and return to the postseason after narrowly missing the playoffs in 1998. Rookie Shaun King replaced the injured and inconsistent Trent Dilfer late in the season. King helped rebound the team to their first NFC Central title in 18 years. The team won 10 out of 12 games at one point in the season, including a then-franchise-record six-game winning streak. The defensive side dominated the team, nine times holding opponents to 10 or fewer points. However, offensive output, while adequate, was often unspectacular – case in point, a 6–3 win over Chicago in October. Tampa Bay finished the season 11–5 (their best record in the Tony Dungy era).

After earning a first-round bye in the playoffs, the Buccaneers won their first divisional round playoff game since 1979, also their first playoff game hosted at Raymond James Stadium. Tampa Bay rallied from a 13–0 deficit and defeated Washington, 14–13, to advance to the conference championship. Leading 6–5 late in the NFC Championship game against the Rams, the Buccaneers lost the lead after a late Ricky Proehl touchdown. With less than a minute remaining, a controversial instant replay reversal of a catch by Bert Emanuel foiled their hopes at an upset victory and a trip to Super Bowl XXXIV.

== Offseason ==
=== NFL draft ===
1999 Tampa Bay Buccaneers draft
Round	Pick	Player	Position	College	Notes
1	15	Booger McFarland	Defensive tackle	LSU	
2	50	Shaun King	Quarterback	Tulane	
3	80	Martín Gramática *	Kicker	Kansas State	
4	113	Dexter Jackson	Safety	Florida State	
5	150	John McLaughlin	Defensive end	California	
6	195	Lamarr Glenn	Fullback	Florida State	
7	226	Robert Hunt	Guard	Virginia	
7	233	Autry Denson	Running back	Notre Dame	
7	240	Darnell McDonald	Wide receiver	Kansas State	
Made roster * Made at least one Pro Bowl during career

== Personnel ==
1999 Tampa Bay Buccaneers staff
Front office: Owner/president – Malcolm Glazer; general manager – Rich McKay; Director of player personnel – Jerry Angelo; Director of college scouting – Tim Ruskell; Head coaches: Head coach – Tony Dungy; Assistant head coach/defensive backs – Herman Edwards; Offensive coaches: Offensive coordinator – Mike Shula; Quarterbacks – Clyde Christensen; Running backs – Tony Nathan; Wide receivers – Charlie Williams; Tight ends – Ricky Thomas; Offensive line – Chris Foerster; Offensive assistant – Wendell Avery	Defensive coaches: Defensive coordinator – Monte Kiffin; Defensive line – Rod Marinelli; Linebackers – Lovie Smith; Defensive assistant – Kevin O'Dea; Special teams coaches: Special teams – Joe Marciano; Strength and conditioning: Strength and conditioning – Mark Asanovich; Assistant strength and conditioning – Les Ebert

== Roster ==
1999 Tampa Bay Buccaneers roster
Quarterbacks (QB): 12 Trent Dilfer; 10 Shaun King; 13 Scott Milanovich; 15 Eric Zeier; Running backs (RB): 40 Mike Alstott FB; 28 Warrick Dunn KR; 35 Fred McAfee; 43 Kevin McLeod; Wide receivers (WR): 85 Reidel Anthony KR; 87 Bert Emanuel; 81 Jacquez Green; 84 Darnell McDonald; 86 Karl Williams PR; Tight ends (TE): 80 John Davis; 82 Patrick Hape; 83 Dave Moore	Offensive linemen (OL): 66 Ken Blackman G; 64 Jorge Diaz G; 65 Kevin Dogins G; 74 Paul Gruber T; 79 George Hegamin T; 61 Tony Mayberry C; 73 Frank Middleton G; 69 Pete Pierson T; 75 Todd Washington G; 70 Jerry Wunsch T; Defensive linemen (DL): 72 Chidi Ahanotu DE; 98 James Cannida DT; 77 Brad Culpepper DT; 97 Tyoka Jackson DE/DT; 78 Marcus Jones DE; 92 Anthony McFarland DT; 95 John McLaughlin DE; 99 Warren Sapp DT; 94 Steve White DE	Linebackers (LB): 55 Derrick Brooks OLB; 58 Don Davis OLB; 59 Jamie Duncan MLB; 50 Jeff Gooch OLB; 56 Hardy Nickerson MLB; 53 Shelton Quarles OLB; 51 Al Singleton OLB; Defensive backs (DB): 21 Donnie Abraham CB; 20 Ronde Barber CB; 34 Dexter Jackson FS; 25 Brian Kelly CB; 47 John Lynch SS; 24 Damien Robinson FS; 30 Shevin Smith SS; 31 Floyd Young CB; Special teams (ST): 7 Martin Gramatica K; 3 Mark Royals P; 68 Morris Unutoa LS	Practice squad: 76 DeMarcus Curry T; 67 Eric De Groh C; 29 Cedric Donaldson CB; 1 Drew O'Connor WR; 22 Aaron Stecker RB; Reserve: 27 Rabih Abdullah RB (IR); 70 Jason Odom T (IR); 54 Mitch Palmer LS (IR); Rookies in italics 53 active, 3 reserve, 5 practice squad

== Regular season ==
=== Schedule ===
Week	Date	Opponent	Result	Record	Venue	Attendance
1	September 12	New York Giants	L 13–17	0–1	Raymond James Stadium	65,026
2	September 19	at Philadelphia Eagles	W 19–5	1–1	Veterans Stadium	64,285
3	September 26	Denver Broncos	W 13–10	2–1	Raymond James Stadium	65,297
4	October 3	at Minnesota Vikings	L 14–21	2–2	Hubert H. Humphrey Metrodome	64,106
5	October 10	at Green Bay Packers	L 23–26	2–3	Lambeau Field	59,868
6	Bye					
7	October 24	Chicago Bears	W 6–3	3–3	Raymond James Stadium	65,283
8	October 31	at Detroit Lions	L 3–20	3–4	Pontiac Silverdome	63,135
9	November 7	at New Orleans Saints	W 31–16	4–4	Louisiana Superdome	47,129
10	November 14	Kansas City Chiefs	W 17–10	5–4	Raymond James Stadium	64,927
11	November 21	Atlanta Falcons	W 19–10	6–4	Raymond James Stadium	65,158
12	November 28	at Seattle Seahawks	W 16–3	7–4	Kingdome	66,314
13	December 6	Minnesota Vikings	W 24–17	8–4	Raymond James Stadium	65,741
14	December 12	Detroit Lions	W 23–16	9–4	Raymond James Stadium	65,536
15	December 19	at Oakland Raiders	L 0–45	9–5	Oakland–Alameda County Coliseum	46,395
16	December 26	Green Bay Packers	W 29–10	10–5	Raymond James Stadium	65,273
17	January 2	at Chicago Bears	W 20–6	11–5	Soldier Field	66,944

=== Standings ===
NFC Central
	W	L	T	PCT	PF	PA	STK
^{(2)} Tampa Bay Buccaneers	11	5	0	.688	270	235	W2
^{(4)} Minnesota Vikings	10	6	0	.625	399	335	W3
^{(6)} Detroit Lions	8	8	0	.500	322	323	L4
Green Bay Packers	8	8	0	.500	357	341	W1
Chicago Bears	6	10	0	.375	272	341	L2

=== Game summaries ===
==== Week 1: New York Giants (lost 13–17) ====
Quarterback Trent Dilfer threw three interceptions (2 returned for touchdowns), and lost one fumble in a pitiful individual performance against the New York Giants. Despite the Buccaneer defense holding the Giants to only 91 yards passing, 28 yards rushing, and only 4 first downs, the Giants scored 17 points off of turnovers. Coach Tony Dungy pulled Dilfer in favor of Eric Zeier, who did not fare well either.

==== Week 2: at Philadelphia Eagles (won 19–5) ====
Tampa Bay sacked rookie Donovan McNabb six times, and recorded nine sacks overall as Tampa Bay won their first game of the 1999 season. Trent Dilfer threw two touchdown passes, and the Buccaneers rushed for over 150 yards.

==== Week 3: Denver Broncos (won 13–10) ====
Mike Alstott rushed for 131 yards and one touchdown, as the Buccaneers defeated the visiting Denver Broncos. The Tampa Bay defense held Terrell Davis to only 53 yards, and quarterback Trent Dilfer was a noteworthy 15-of-18 with no interceptions. Tampa Bay took a 13–10 lead into halftime, and the second half was scoreless.

==== Week 4: at Minnesota Vikings (lost 14–21) ====
The Minnesota Vikings blasted out to a 21–0 lead in the first quarter, with Randall Cunningham throwing three touchdown passes. With Warren Sapp out with an injury, the Vikings totalled 192-yard of offense. After trimming the deficit to 21–14, the Buccaneers drove late in the fourth quarter looking to tie the game. With two minutes left, Trent Dilfer underthrew the ball to Warrick Dunn, and was intercepted at the Minnesota 10-yard line. With enough time for one last possession, the Buccaneers drove to the Minnesota 18-yard line. Dilfer's final pass to the endzone was knocked down as time expired.

==== Week 5: at Green Bay Packers (lost 23–26) ====
Trent Dilfer threw three interceptions and lost one fumble, but appeared to be leading Tampa Bay to a fourth quarter comeback victory on Sunday Night Football at Lambeau Field against the Green Bay Packers.

After falling behind 10–0, the Buccaneers managed a 13–13 tie at half time. Trailing 19–16 with less than two minutes to go, Mike Alstott rumbled 22 yards for a go-ahead touchdown. Not to be denied, however, Brett Favre drove the Packers 73 yards in only 6 plays, and won the game 26–23.

The Buccaneers fell to 2–3 going into their bye week.

==== Week 7: Chicago Bears (won 6–3) ====
Both the Buccaneers and Chicago Bears suffered through offensive futility, in a division game where both teams combined for only nine points. Slumping quarterback Trent Dilfer passed for only 121 yards, while fans booed him throughout the afternoon. Twice in the first quarter, Dilfer missed wide-open receivers in the endzone. Martin Gramatica scored two field goals in the first half for Tampa Bay's only points. But Gramatica also bounced one field goal attempt off the left upright, his first miss of the season.

Cade McNown was benched by the Bears in the third quarter after being intercepted by Derrick Brooks. Chicago's first eight drives saw seven punts and the turnover. McNown was replaced by Jim Miller. Late in the fourth quarter, with Tampa Bay clinging to a 6–0 lead, the Bears faced 3rd & 4 at the Tampa Bay 9 yard line. Curtis Enis was stuffed for no gain, a crucial stop by the Buccaneers defense. The Bears settled for a field goal, and the score was now 6–3.

After a quick three-and-out, the Bears got the ball back with 1:43 left in regulation. With 45 seconds left, Derrick Brooks intercepted quarterback Jim Miller near midfield to secure the win. Brooks was the star of the game with 10 tackles, 4 passes defended, and two interceptions.

==== Week 8: at Detroit Lions (lost 3–20) ====
The biggest news going into the game was the benching of quarterback Trent Dilfer. Back-up Eric Zeier was named the starter for week 8. On Sunday Night Football, the Buccaneers visited the Detroit Lions.

Trailing 17–3 late in the third quarter, the Buccaneers appeared to reach the endzone and shift the game's momentum. Warrick Dunn caught a 12-yard touchdown pass from Zeier, and the team lined up for the extra point, and a certain 17–10 score. With only ten men on the field, and confusion among the Buccaneers players, a delay of game penalty was incurred. During the delay, the Lions sidelines took the opportunity to throw the challenge flag, and the touchdown was reviewed. The replay showed Dunn was down at the one-yard line, and play continued. Moments later, Mike Alstott fumbled away the ball at the 2, and the Lions recovered. A field goal off the turnover iced the game for Detroit.

==== Week 9: at New Orleans Saints (won 31–16) ====
Eric Zeier's stint as starting quarterback lasted only one week, and Trent Dilfer returned to the lineup. The Buccaneers rolled over the Saints, with Dilfer passing for 227 yards and three touchdowns. The biggest of the day being an early 62-yard bomb to Jacquez Green. Mike Alstott rushed for 117 yards and one touchdown.

==== Week 10: Kansas City Chiefs (won 17–10) ====
Trent Dilfer passed for 270 yards and two touchdowns (35 yards, 52 yards, respectively), but six turnovers nearly foiled the afternoon. The Buccaneer defense remained firm and held Kansas City to 5 yards passing in the first half. Dilfer, however, threw one interception and fumbled away a snap and Mike Alstott lost three fumbles.

Leading 17–10 with 3 minutes to go, the Buccaneers looked to run out the clock. Alstott, however, committed his third fumble, and the Chiefs took over at their own 17. In ten plays, Elvis Grbac drove the Chiefs 66 yards to the Tampa Bay 13. With 28 seconds remaining in regulation, Hardy Nickerson intercepted Grbac in the endzone, and Tampa Bay held on to win.

==== Week 11: Atlanta Falcons (won 19–10) ====
Martin Gramatica kicked four field goals against Atlanta, leading the team in scoring for the day. Trailing 9–10 with 53 seconds remaining, Gramatica kicked a 53-yard field goal, and Tampa Bay took a 12–10 lead, their first lead of the day. Just moments later, Donnie Abraham intercepted Chris Chandler and returned the ball 47 yards for a touchdown to seal the victory.

==== Week 12: at Seattle Seahawks (won 16–3) ====
Tampa Bay traveled to the west coast to take on the 8–2 Seahawks, and looked to break a long west coast losing trend.

A tough first half saw a 3–3 tie. In the third quarter, the season came to a turning point. Quarterback Trent Dilfer was sacked by Phillip Daniels and suffered a broken clavicle. Dilfer sat out the remainder of the season, and rookie Shaun King took over as quarterback. King was only 3-for-7, but threw a touchdown pass in the fourth quarter to lead the Buccaneers to victory.

==== Week 13: Minnesota Vikings (won 24–17) ====
Shaun King made his first start against division rival Minnesota on Monday Night Football. The Buccaneers jumped out to a 7–0 lead after Donnie Abraham intercepted Jeff George for a 55-yard touchdown return. King passed for only 93 yards, but threw two touchdowns. Minnesota dominated the first half, but four first half drives into Tampa Bay territory came up empty.

The Buccaneers won their fifth straight game, and snapped Minnesota's five-game winning streak. Tampa Bay sat atop the NFC Central standings, tied for the lead with Detroit.

==== Week 14: Detroit Lions (won 23–16) ====
Tampa Bay evened the series against Detroit, and took over sole possession of first place in the NFC Central. Shaun King passed for 297 yards and two touchdowns.

==== Week 15: at Oakland Raiders (lost 0–45) ====
Tampa Bay's franchise record six consecutive wins came to a screeching halt, as the Oakland Raiders trounced the Buccaneers 45–0. The Buccaneers were held to under 30 yards rushing, while Shaun King suffered mightily. The Raiders intercepted King once, returned a King fumble for a touchdown, sacked King four times, and took a 21–0 lead into halftime. In the third quarter, coach Tony Dungy pulled his starters from the game, and rested them for the upcoming games.

==== Week 16: Green Bay Packers (won 29–10) ====
On the day after Christmas, Tampa Bay hosted Green Bay in a key division game. Four Packers turnovers turned into 20 Buccaneers points. Three Gramatica field goals established a 9–0 lead, but Green Bay took the lead 10–9 at halftime. In the fourth quarter, Mike Alstott's two touchdown runs put the game out of reach for Green Bay.

With the victory, Tampa Bay improved to 10–5, and a win in week 17 would clinch the division title.

==== Week 17: at Chicago Bears (won 20–6) ====
Tampa Bay traveled to Soldier Field to take on the Bears, with a division title on the line. Tampa Bay easily handled the 6–9 Bears, and won their first NFC Central title since 1981. Shaun King threw for 178 yards, and one touchdown. Mike Alstott scored one touchdown run. The Buccaneers earned a first-round bye for the playoffs. Longtime Buccaneer player Paul Gruber suffered a broken leg, and missed the rest of the season, and it was ultimately his final NFL game.

== Postseason ==
=== Game summaries ===
==== NFC Divisional Playoffs: Washington Redskins (won 14–13) ====
NFC Divisional Playoffs: (#3) Washington Redskins at (#2) Tampa Bay Buccaneers

Quarter	1	2	3	4	Total
Redskins	0	3	10	0	13
Buccaneers	0	0	7	7	14

at Raymond James Stadium, Tampa, Florida

- Date: January 15
- Game time: 4:00 p.m. EST
- Game weather: Clear, 68 °F (20 °C)
- Game attendance: 65,835
- Referee: Dick Hantak (105)
- TV announcers (FOX): Dick Stockton (play-by-play) and Matt Millen (color commentator)
- Game Book

Game information
First quarter
- No scoring plays.

Second quarter

- WAS – Brett Conway 28-yard field goal, 5:37. Redskins 3–0. Drive: 8 plays, 33 yards, 4:45.

Third quarter

- WAS – Brian Mitchell 100-yard kickoff return, 14:41. Redskins 10–0. Drive: 0 plays, 0 yards, 0:19.
- WAS – Brett Conway 48-yard field goal, 8:10. Redskins 13–0. Drive: 4 plays, 6 yards, 1:41.
- TB – Mike Alstott 2-yard run (Martín Gramática kick), 2:03. Redskins 13–7. Drive: 6 plays, 73 yards, 3:03.

Fourth quarter

- TB – John Davis 1-yard pass from Shaun King (Martín Gramática kick), 7:29. Buccaneers 14–13. Drive: 10 plays, 32 yards, 5:52.

The Buccaneers forced two key turnovers in the second half to rally from a 13–0 deficit, while their defense held Washington to just 157 yards, with only 32 in the second half.

After a scoreless first quarter, a 35-yard punt from Mark Royals gave the Redskins great field position on the Tampa Bay 43-yard line. Brad Johnson started out the drive with a 19-yard completion to Albert Connell, and then a 12-yard run by Stephen Davis set up a 28-yard field goal from Brett Conway with 5:37 remaining in the second quarter. Then in the second half, Brian Mitchell returned the opening kickoff 100 yards for a touchdown, a playoff record. Later in the third quarter, Darrell Green intercepted a pass from Buccaneers quarterback Shaun King and returned it 12 yards to the Buccaneers 36-yard line, setting up Conway's second field goal to take a 13–0 lead. But after a Bucs punt, Tampa Bay safety John Lynch intercepted a pass from Johnson on the Tampa Bay 27-yard line. Aided by a 31-yard pass interference penalty on Leomont Evans, the Buccaneers subsequently drove 73 yards in 6 plays and scored on Mike Alstott's 2-yard touchdown run. Then in the fourth quarter, defensive tackle Steve White forced a fumble from Brad Johnson while sacking him and Warren Sapp recovered the ball on the Redskins 32-yard line. King then went to work, completing a 17-yard pass to Bert Emanuel and a 13-yard pass to Warrick Dunn. On fourth down and 1, Alstott's 5-yard run moved the ball to the Washington 3-yard line, and King eventually finished the drive with a 1-yard touchdown pass to John Davis.

The Redskins had a chance to win the game with a 52-yard field goal attempt in the final seconds of the game, but the snap from center Dan Turk to Brad Johnson, the holder, was off and the Bucs won. Contrary to popular belief, the snap was not to Matt Turk, the team's punter, and also his brother. This was Dan Turk's last game in the NFL, as he died later that year due to cancer. Meanwhile, King became the first rookie to lead his team to a playoff win since Pat Haden in 1976.

==== NFC Championship: at St. Louis Rams (lost 6–11) ====
NFC Divisional Playoffs: (#2) Tampa Bay Buccaneers at (#1) St. Louis Rams

Quarter	1	2	3	4	Total
Buccaneers	3	0	3	0	6
Rams	3	2	0	6	11

at Trans World Dome, St. Louis, Missouri

- Date: January 23
- Game time: 4:00 p.m. EST/3:00 p.m. CST
- Game weather: None (indoor stadium)
- Game attendance: 66,396
- Referee: Bill Carollo (63)
- TV announcers (FOX): Pat Summerall (play-by-play) and John Madden (color commentator)
- Game Book

Game information
First quarter
- TB – Martín Gramática 25-yard field goal, 12:22. Buccaneers 3–0. Drive: 6 plays, 13 yards, 2:23.
- STL – Jeff Wilkins 24-yard field goal, 4:17. Tied 3–3. Drive: 16 plays, 74 yards, 8:05.

Second quarter

- STL – Tony Mayberry fumble out of bounds in the end zone for a safety, 14:55. Rams 5–3.

Third quarter

- TB – Martín Gramática 25-yard field goal, 10:28. Buccaneers 6–5. Drive: 9 plays, 66 yards, 4:32.

Fourth quarter

- STL – Ricky Proehl 30-yard pass from Kurt Warner (pass failed), 4:44. Rams 11–6. Drive: 6 plays, 47 yards, 3:17.

The Rams and Buccaneers slugged it out for most of the game, with the Buccaneers defense holding the Rams' highly-potent offense in check. Tampa Bay, weak on offense, only mustered two field goals, and gave up a costly safety in the second quarter when a bad snap from center went over the head of rookie quarterback Shaun King and out of the endzone. Despite this, the Buccaneers nursed an unusual 6–5 lead into the fourth quarter. The Rams broke open a defense dominated game when Kurt Warner threw a touchdown pass to Ricky Proehl with 4:44 left in the game. The Buccaneers mounted a drive on their final possession, however a replay overturned what appeared to be a reception by Buccaneers wide receiver Bert Emanuel, and the Buccaneers never recovered.

On the first play of the game, Bucs defensive end Steve White intercepted a screen pass from Warner on the Rams 20-yard line, setting up a 25-yard field goal from Martin Gramatica. But that was all they could manage in the first quarter. On one possession, they moved the ball to the St. Louis 23-yard line, but then King was sacked and fumbled. Tampa Bay recovered the ball, but lost 12 yards and were pushed out of field goal range. Then with 11 seconds left in the period, King threw a pass from the St. Louis 41-yard line that went right into the surprised arms of safety Todd Lyght. The Rams didn't do much better. After Gramatica's field goal, they drove 74 yards in 16 plays before a fumbled handoff from Warner to Marshall Faulk on third down forced them to settle for a 24-yard field goal by Jeff Wilkins. Then on their next drive, Wilkins missed a field goal attempt from 44 yards.

In the second quarter, a high snap from Bucs center Tony Mayberry went over King's head and into the end zone. King managed to knock the ball out of the end zone to prevent a touchdown, but it gave the Rams a safety and a 5–3 lead. This was the score by halftime, despite the Rams' 159–75 advantage over the Buccaneers in total yards.

Just as in the first half, Tampa Bay scored a field goal on their opening drive on the third quarter, set up by a 32-yard reception by Jacquez Green and a 15-yard facemask penalty on Taje Allen. Meanwhile, Warner was intercepted three times by the Buccaneers defense, including a costly interception to Hardy Nickerson on the Tampa Bay 3-yard line. But late in the fourth quarter, Rams cornerback Dre' Bly intercepted a pass from King at the Buccaneers 49-yard line. A few plays later, Warner threw a 30-yard touchdown pass to Proehl with 4:44 left, taking an 11–6 lead after the two-point conversion failed.

Despite being sacked twice, King responded by leading the Buccaneers to the St. Louis 22-yard line. With 47 seconds remaining, King completed an apparent 13-yard reception to Bert Emanuel at the Rams' 22-yard line, setting up a 3rd & 10. The ruling on the field was initially a complete pass, as officials spotted the ball at the 22. The Buccaneers called a quick timeout (their final timeout) and huddled. Booth replay-official Jerry Markbreit ordered a review of the call during the timeout. Referee Bill Carollo determined that the nose of the ball had touched the ground as he brought it into his body, despite Emanuel having what appeared to be control. The catch was overturned, ruled incomplete, and Tampa Bay was moved back to a 3rd & 23 at the 35. King threw two incompletions, the second a desperation pass that went out the back of the endzone. The Buccaneers turned the ball over on downs, and the Rams held on to win 11–6.

The ensuing controversy prompted the NFL to clarify the rule regarding what constitutes a valid pass reception. This came to be known as "The Bert Emanuel Rule."

Proehl was the sole offensive star of the game, finishing with six catches for 100 yards and one touchdown.
