= 1998 Tampa Bay Buccaneers season =

NFL team season

- Owner: Malcolm Glazer
- General manager: Rich McKay
- Head coach: Tony Dungy
- Home stadium: Raymond James Stadium

Results
- Record: 8–8
- Division place: 3rd NFC Central
- Playoffs: Did not qualify
- All-Pros: 3: FB Mike Alstott; LB Derrick Brooks (2nd team); DT Warren Sapp (2nd team)
- Pro Bowlers: 5: FB Mike Alstott; LB Derrick Brooks; C Tony Mayberry; MLB Hardy Nickerson; DT Warren Sapp
- Team MVP: LB Derrick Brooks

The 1998 Tampa Bay Buccaneers season was the franchise's 23rd season in the National Football League (NFL) and their first season in Raymond James Stadium.

Following their breakthrough 1997 season, the Buccaneers finished 8–8 and missed the postseason; nonetheless they were the only team to beat the 15–1 Minnesota Vikings during the regular season. In Week 17, they recorded the biggest road win in franchise history with a 35–0 win over the Cincinnati Bengals, a record that stood until the 2020 team defeated the Detroit Lions 47–7 in Detroit.

== Offseason ==
=== NFL draft ===
1998 Tampa Bay Buccaneers draft
Round	Pick	Player	Position	College	Notes
2	34	Jacquez Green	Wide receiver	Florida	
2	45	Brian Kelly	Cornerback	USC	
3	84	Jamie Duncan	Linebacker	Vanderbilt	
4	104	Todd Washington	Center	Virginia Tech	
6	175	James Cannida	Defensive tackle	Nevada	
6	184	Shevin Smith	Safety	Florida State	
7	212	Chance McCarty	Defensive end	TCU	
Made roster * Made at least one Pro Bowl during career

== Personnel ==
=== Staff / Coaches ===
1998 Tampa Bay Buccaneers staff
Front office: Owner/president – Malcolm Glazer; General manager – Rich McKay; Director of player personnel – Jerry Angelo; Director of college scouting – Tim Ruskell; Head coaches: Head coach – Tony Dungy; Assistant head coach/defensive backs – Herman Edwards; Offensive coaches: Offensive coordinator – Mike Shula; Running backs – Tony Nathan; Wide receivers – Charlie Williams; Tight ends – Clyde Christensen; Offensive line – Chris Foerster; Offensive assistant – Ricky Thomas	Defensive coaches: Defensive coordinator – Monte Kiffin; Defensive line – Rod Marinelli; Linebackers – Lovie Smith; Defensive assistant – Kevin O'Dea; Special teams coaches: Special teams – Joe Marciano; Strength and conditioning: Strength and conditioning – Mark Asanovich; Strength and conditioning assistant – Aaron Komarek

=== Final roster ===
1998 Tampa Bay Buccaneers roster
Quarterbacks (QB): 12 Trent Dilfer; 13 Scott Milanovich; 4 Steve Walsh; Running backs (RB): 26 Rabih Abdullah; 40 Mike Alstott FB; 28 Warrick Dunn; 37 Jerry Ellison; 41 Lorenzo Neal FB; Wide receivers (WR): 85 Reidel Anthony KR; 89 Horace Copeland; 87 Bert Emanuel; 81 Jacquez Green; 84 Robb Thomas; 86 Karl Williams PR; Tight ends (TE): 80 John Davis; 82 Patrick Hape; 83 Dave Moore	Offensive linemen (OL): 64 Jorge Diaz G; 65 Kevin Dogins G; 74 Paul Gruber T; 61 Tony Mayberry C; 73 Frank Middleton G; 70 Jason Odom T; 69 Pete Pierson T; 75 Todd Washington C; 71 Jerry Wunsch T; Defensive linemen (DL): 98 James Cannida DT; 73 Brad Culpepper DT; 97 Tyoka Jackson DE; 78 Marcus Jones DE; 96 Bryant Mix DE; 99 Warren Sapp DT; 91 Regan Upshaw DE; 94 Steve White DE	Linebackers (LB): 55 Derrick Brooks OLB; 58 Don Davis MLB; 59 Jamie Duncan MLB; 50 Jeff Gooch OLB; 53 Shelton Quarles OLB; 51 Al Singleton OLB; Defensive backs (DB): 21 Donnie Abraham CB; 20 Ronde Barber CB; 23 Tony Bouie FS; 25 Brian Kelly CB; 47 John Lynch SS; 22 Charles Mincy FS; 27 Anthony Parker CB; 29 Shevin Smith SS; 33 Eric Vance SS; 31 Floyd Young CB; Special teams (ST): 6 Tommy Barnhardt P; 5 Michael Husted K; 54 Mitch Palmer LS	Practice squad: 43 Lamont Hall TE; 67 Steve Ingram T; 46 Kevin McLeod RB; 66 Jamie Vanderveldt T; 17 Geroy Simon WR; Reserve: 72 Chidi Ahanotu DE (IR); 11 Jeff Brohm QB (IR); 88 Brice Hunter WR (IR); 90 Jason Maniecki DT (IR); 56 Hardy Nickerson LB (IR); 24 Damien Robinson S (IR); Rookies in italics 53 active, 6 reserve, 5 practice squad

== Preseason ==
Week	Date	Opponent	Result	Record	Venue
HOF	August 1	Pittsburgh Steelers	W 30–6	1–0	Fawcett Stadium
1	August 8	Kansas City Chiefs	L 13–17	1–1	Oklahoma Memorial Stadium
2	August 13	at Miami Dolphins	L 13–14	1–2	Pro Player Stadium
3	August 24	at Oakland Raiders	W 41–7	2–2	Network Associates Coliseum
4	August 28	at New Orleans Saints	L 6–10	2–3	Louisiana Superdome

== Regular season ==
=== Schedule ===
Week	Date	Opponent	Result	Record	Venue	Attendance	Recap
1	September 6	at **Minnesota Vikings**	**L** 7–31	0–1	Hubert H. Humphrey Metrodome	62,538	Recap
2	September 13	at **Green Bay Packers**	**L** 15–23	0–2	Lambeau Field	60,124	Recap
3	September 20	**Chicago Bears**	**W** 27–15	1–2	Raymond James Stadium	64,328	Recap
4	September 28	at **Detroit Lions**	**L** 6–27	1–3	Pontiac Silverdome	74,724	Recap
5	October 4	New York Giants	**W** 20–3	2–3	Raymond James Stadium	64,989	Recap
6	Bye						
7	October 18	Carolina Panthers	**W** 16–13	3–3	Raymond James Stadium	63,600	Recap
8	October 25	at New Orleans Saints	**L** 3–9	3–4	Louisiana Superdome	52,695	Recap
9	November 1	**Minnesota Vikings**	**W** 27–24	4–4	Raymond James Stadium	64,979	Recap
10	November 8	Tennessee Oilers	**L** 22–31	4–5	Raymond James Stadium	65,054	Recap
11	November 15	at Jacksonville Jaguars	**L** 24–29	4–6	Alltel Stadium	72,974	Recap
12	November 22	**Detroit Lions**	**L** 25–28	4–7	Raymond James Stadium	64,265	Recap
13	November 29	at **Chicago Bears**	**W** 31–17	5–7	Soldier Field	51,938	Recap
14	December 7	**Green Bay Packers**	**W** 24–22	6–7	Raymond James Stadium	65,497	Recap
15	December 13	Pittsburgh Steelers	**W** 16–3	7–7	Raymond James Stadium	65,335	Recap
16	December 19	at Washington Redskins	**L** 16–20	7–8	Jack Kent Cooke Stadium	66,309	Recap
17	December 27	at Cincinnati Bengals	**W** 35–0	8–8	Riverfront Stadium	49,826	Recap

Note: Intra-division opponents are in bold text.

== Game summaries ==
=== Preseason ===
The Buccaneers moved out of aging Houlihan's Stadium after the 1997 season. With construction crews still putting the finishing touches on brand new Raymond James Stadium, the Buccaneers were forced to play all of their preseason games on the road. The team opened with a win against Pittsburgh in the Hall of Fame Game, then faced Kansas City in Oklahoma, an ordeal which saw the team sit at the airport nearly all night.

After another road trip to Miami, the travel started taking a toll on the team. A cross-country trip to Oakland was followed four days later by a game at New Orleans.

=== Week 1: at Minnesota Vikings ===
Coming off their playoff season from 1997, the Buccaneers opened 1998 with high expectations. Still on the road, their first game in the new stadium would have to wait until week 3. Receiver Bert Emanuel went out with a sprained ankle, and Tampa Bay lost 31–7.

=== Week 2: at Green Bay Packers ===
Jacques Green returned a punt 95 yards for a touchdown (only his second-career return attempt) to set a franchise record for longest punt return. However, Green Bay won 23–15.

=== Week 3: Chicago Bears ===
After five games on the road during the preseason, and the first two regular season games played away, the Buccaneers finally were ready for a home game. The highly anticipated first game at brand new Raymond James Stadium saw the Buccaneers host the Bears. After falling behind 15–0 at halftime, Tampa Bay scored 27 unanswered points to win 27–15. Dave Moore caught a one-handed pass for a 44-yard touchdown in the third quarter. In the fourth quarter, Warrick Dunn ran for a 44-yard touchdown. Raymond James Stadium was opened with a victory, and the Buccaneers improved to 1–2.

=== Week 4: at Detroit Lions ===
On Monday Night Football, Tampa Bay faced Detroit at the Silverdome. Despite clinging to a 6–3 deficit at halftime, Tampa Bay's sputtering offense and defensive miscues cost any chance at victory. Barry Sanders rushed for 131 yards, Bryant Westbrook returned an interception 34 yards for a touchdown, and Terry Fair returned a Lions record 105-yard kickoff return touchdown. Two apparent touchdown passes by Trent Dilfer were called back for penalty, and Tampa Bay fell 27–6.

=== Week 5: New York Giants ===
Only a minute and a half into the game, Charles Mincy intercepted Kanell for a 22-yard touchdown return. Tampa Bay would never trail in the game. The Buccaneer defense held the Giants to only 135 total yards, and picked off Kanell three times in the 20–3 victory.

=== Week 7: Carolina Panthers ===
Tampa Bay evened their record to 3–3 with a win over Carolina. The Panthers led 13–3 in the fourth quarter, but Trent Dilfer led the Buccaneers for a rally in the final 5 minutes. On a roll out, Dilfer ran in for a 1-yard touchdown, then on the next possession, scored the go-ahead touchdown. Karl Williams caught a 29-yard touchdown pass in the corner of the endzone with 1:39 to go to seal the victory 16–13.

The Buccaneers improved to 3–0 at Raymond James Stadium.

=== Week 8: at New Orleans Saints ===
The Tampa Bay offense dropped seven passes, Patrick Hape lost a fumble at the Saints 3-yard line, and Trent Dilfer threw an interception, as offensive futility again plagued the Buccaneers, resulting in a 9–3 loss at New Orleans. Three times the Buccaneers had the ball inside the Saints 25-yard line, but came up with zero points. At one point, Bert Emanuel caught a touchdown pass, but the officials ruled it incomplete, saying he "trapped" the ball against the turf.

=== Week 9: Minnesota Vikings ===
The Vikings entered week 9 at Tampa Bay undefeated at 7–0. Derrick Brooks intercepted Randall Cunningham, setting up Warrick Dunn's first touchdown run. A back and forth game saw the score tied 17–17 at halftime. Minnesota took a 24–17 lead in the third quarter, but Tampa Bay came back in the fourth. A field goal followed by a Mike Alstott touchdown run with just under six minutes remaining gave the Bucs a 27–24 lead. The Buccaneers had two rushers over 100 yards: Alstott (128) and Dunn (115), with Alstott sealing the game late with a rush of 38 yards.

Tampa Bay defeated Minnesota 27–24, the Vikings’ first loss and only one during the regular season. The Bucs remained at 0.500, improving to 4–4, and were now 4–0 at Raymond James Stadium.

=== Week 10: Tennessee Oilers ===
Tampa Bay held a 16–3 halftime lead, but trailing 24–22 at the two-minute warning, Tennessee was facing 3rd down & 8 at their own 29-yard line. A defensive stop by Tampa Bay would have given them the ball back, and an opportunity to drive for a game-winning field goal. However, quarterback Steve McNair broke out for a game-icing 71-yard touchdown run, and the Tennessee Oilers won 31–22.

=== Week 11: at Jacksonville Jaguars ===
Tampa Bay was leading 24–23 with three minutes remaining. Fred Taylor broke out for a 70-yard touchdown run with 2:40 left, and Jacksonville won 29–24.

=== Week 12: Detroit Lions ===
Tampa Bay trailed 21–7, but rallied late. With just over two minutes remaining, Trent Dilfer drove the Buccaneers to the Detroit 11-yard line. He was intercepted in the endzone, and Detroit held on to win 28–25. It was Tampa Bay's third straight loss.

=== Week 13: at Chicago Bears ===
Tampa Bay got back to their winning ways, winning their first road game of the season at Chicago. Late in the second quarter, the Buccaneers blocked a Bears punt, and Ronde Barber scooped it up. He returned the ball 21 yards for a touchdown. As time expired in the first half, Trent Dilfer threw up a Hail Mary touchdown, which was caught by Brice Hunter, his first career NFL touchdown. The Bucs took a 21–14 lead into halftime, and won the game 31–17.

Tampa Bay's record was now 5–7, still alive for the wild card hunt.

=== Week 14: Green Bay Packers ===
Tampa Bay hosted Green Bay in their first Monday Night Football home game since 1982. The Buccaneers forced 8 fumbles, and sacked Brett Favre 8 times. Late in the first quarter, Trent Dilfer connected to Jacquez Green for a 64-yard touchdown pass. Minutes later, at the beginning of the second quarter, Dilfer passed to Bert Emanuel in a nearly identical 62-yard touchdown pass. Leading 17–15 in the fourth quarter, Dilfer scrambled through the middle of the Packers defensive line to score a 6-yard touchdown, and a 24–15 lead. Green bay would trim the deficit to 24–22, but the Buccaneers held on to win.

Tampa Bay improved to 6–7 on the season.

=== Week 15: Pittsburgh Steelers ===
Tampa Bay won their third game in a row, shutting down the Steelers to just 168 yard of offense. The Tampa Bay defense intercepted Kordell Stewart three times, and Mike Tomczak once. Mike Alstott ran for 78 yards on a wet and rainy day. The Steelers only points came early in the fourth quarter. After four tries, this was Tampa Bay's first win over Pittsburgh in team history.

Tampa Bay won 16–3 and evened their record at 7–7. They were now back in the hunt for the wild card.

=== Week 16: at Washington Redskins ===
Tampa Bay's playoff chances were dealt a big blow in the Week 16 loss at Washington. Tampa Bay led the Redskins 16–7 early in the fourth quarter, but blew the lead at the end. Leading 16–13 with six minutes to go, Jacquez Green fumbled a kickoff, turning the ball over. On the next play, Stephen Alexander caught the game-winning touchdown for Washington. Tampa Bay had two last chances to come back, but both times, Trent Dilfer threw interceptions.

The Buccaneers fell to 7–8 on the season, and would need to win in week 17 to keep their playoff hopes alive.

=== Week 17: at Cincinnati Bengals ===
Tampa Bay clobbered Cincinnati 35–0, a franchise best for a road shutout until 2020. Mike Alstott scored three rushing touchdowns, and the Bucs defense intercepted the Bengals twice (including a 56-yard return by Ronde Barber)

Tampa Bay finished 8–8 on the season, winning four out of their last five games. At the conclusion of the game, they were still alive for an NFC wild card spot. Tampa Bay needed the Giants to beat the Eagles and the Chargers to beat the Cardinals. The Giants won, helping Tampa Bay, but the Cardinals beat the Chargers 16–13 with a 52-yard field goal as time expired. By the time the Buccaneers' plane had landed back in Tampa, they were ousted from the playoffs.

=== Standings ===
NFC Central
	W	L	T	PCT	PF	PA	STK
^{(1)} Minnesota Vikings	15	1	0	.938	556	296	W8
^{(5)} Green Bay Packers	11	5	0	.688	408	319	W3
Tampa Bay Buccaneers	8	8	0	.500	314	295	W1
Detroit Lions	5	11	0	.313	306	378	L4
Chicago Bears	4	12	0	.250	276	368	L1
