= 1997 Tampa Bay Buccaneers season =

NFL team season

- Owner: Malcolm Glazer
- General manager: Rich McKay
- Head coach: Tony Dungy
- Offensive coordinator: Mike Shula
- Defensive coordinator: Monte Kiffin
- Home stadium: Houlihan's Stadium

Results
- Record: 10–6
- Division place: 2nd NFC Central
- Playoffs: Won Wild Card Playoffs (vs. Lions) 20–10; Lost Divisional Playoffs (at Packers) 7–21
- All-Pros: FB Mike Alstott, MLB Hardy Nickerson
- Pro Bowlers: 9: FB Mike Alstott; LB Derrick Brooks; QB Trent Dilfer; HB Warrick Dunn; SS John Lynch; C Tony Mayberry; MLB Hardy Nickerson; DT Warren Sapp; LT Paul Gruber (alternate)
- Team MVP: QB Trent Dilfer

The 1997 Tampa Bay Buccaneers season was the franchise's 22nd season in the National Football League (NFL). Having gone 6–10 the previous season, Tampa Bay finished second in the NFC Central, and secured their first playoff berth since the strike-shortened 1982 season.

The 1997 season was notable for several reasons. The team retired their orange and white color scheme and "Bucco Bruce" logo, replacing it with a new more marketable and intimidating image. The brand new pewter and red uniforms featured a new "skulls and swords" logo, new fonts, and prominent end zone markings. The 1997 season would also be their final season playing in Houlihan's Stadium. Next door, the much-anticipated Raymond James Stadium was under construction. It was also future hall of famer Ronde Barber's first season with the team.

The Buccaneers stunned many analysts by starting the regular season with a 5–0 record. The Buccaneers had totaled more than five wins in only five of their previous fourteen seasons. By the end of the season, they had built a record of 10–6 and went to the playoffs for the first time in 15 years. Tampa Bay defeated Detroit 20–10 in the Wild Card round, their first playoff victory since 1979. They lost to the eventual NFC champion Green Bay Packers, 21–7 in the Divisional Round.

== Offseason ==
=== NFL draft ===
Round	Pick #	Overall	Name	Position	College
1	12	12	Warrick Dunn	Running back	Florida State
1	16	16	Reidel Anthony	Wide receiver	Florida
2	7	37	Jerry Wunsch	Offensive tackle	Wisconsin
3	3	63	Frank Middleton	Guard	Arizona
3	6	66	Ronde Barber	Cornerback	Virginia
4	32	128	Alshermond Singleton	Linebacker	Temple
5	7	137	Patrick Hape	Tight end	Alabama
6	6	169	Al Harris	Cornerback	Texas A&M-Kingsville
6	34	197	Nigea Carter	Wide receiver	Michigan State
7	8	209	Anthony DeGrate	Defensive tackle	Stephen F. Austin

== Personnel ==
1997 Tampa Bay Buccaneers staff
Front office: Owner/president – Malcolm Glazer; General manager – Rich McKay; Director of player personnel – Jerry Angelo; Director of college scouting – Tim Ruskell; Head coaches: Head coach – Tony Dungy; Assistant head coach/defensive backs – Herman Edwards; Offensive coaches: Offensive coordinator – Mike Shula; Running backs – Tony Nathan; Wide receivers – Charlie Williams; Tight ends – Clyde Christensen; Offensive line – Chris Foerster; Offensive assistant – Ricky Thomas	Defensive coaches: Defensive coordinator – Monte Kiffin; Defensive line – Rod Marinelli; Linebackers – Lovie Smith; Defensive assistant – Kevin O'Dea; Special teams coaches: Special teams – Joe Marciano; Strength and conditioning: Strength and conditioning – Morris Hill, PA-C, ATC; Strength and conditioning assistant – Nathan Burgett, ATC

== Roster ==
1997 Tampa Bay Buccaneers roster
Quarterbacks (QB): 12 Trent Dilfer; 13 Scott Milanovich; 4 Steve Walsh; Running backs (RB): 40 Mike Alstott FB; 28 Warrick Dunn; 37 Jerry Ellison; 32 Errict Rhett; Wide receivers (WR): 85 Reidel Anthony; 88 Horace Copeland; 84 Robb Thomas; 86 Karl Williams; Tight ends (TE): 87 John Davis; 82 Patrick Hape; 80 Jackie Harris; 48 Andrew Jordan; 83 Dave Moore	Offensive linemen (OL): 64 Jorge Diaz G; 65 Kevin Dogins C; 74 Paul Gruber T; 61 Tony Mayberry C; 73 Frank Middleton G; 70 Jason Odom T; 69 Pete Pierson T; 60 Jim Pyne G; 71 Jerry Wunsch T; Defensive linemen (DL): 72 Chidi Ahanotu DE; 77 Brad Culpepper DT; 75 Eric Curry DE; 97 Tyoka Jackson DT; 78 Marcus Jones DT; 90 Jason Maniecki DT; 99 Warren Sapp DT; 91 Regan Upshaw DE; 94 Steve White DE	Linebackers (LB): 52 Greg Bellisari MLB; 55 Derrick Brooks OLB; 50 Jeff Gooch OLB; 56 Hardy Nickerson MLB; 59 Rufus Porter OLB; 53 Shelton Quarles OLB; 51 Al Singleton OLB; Defensive backs (DB): 21 Donnie Abraham CB; 20 Ronde Barber CB; 23 Tony Bouie SS; 25 Melvin Johnson FS; 45 Tyrone Legette CB; 47 John Lynch SS; 22 Charles Mincy FS; 27 Anthony Parker CB; 24 Damien Robinson FS; 31 Floyd Young CB; Special teams (ST): 5 Michael Husted K; 7 Sean Landeta P	Practice squad: 81 Nigea Carter WR (PS/I); 30 Al Harris CB; 19 Brice Hunter WR; 44 Steve Lee RB; 66 Kenneth McDaniel T; 17 Geroy Simon WR; Reserve: 6 Tommy Barnhardt P (IR); 67 Steve Ingram G (IR); 1 Marvin Marshall WR (IR); -- Brian Newnam G (IR); 53 active, 5 inactive, 5 practice squad Rookies in italics

== Regular season ==
=== Schedule ===
Week	Date	Opponent	Result	Venue	Attendance	Record
1	August 31	San Francisco 49ers*	W 13–6	Houlihan's Stadium	62,554	1–0
2	September 7	at Detroit Lions	W 24–17	Pontiac Silverdome	58,234	2–0
3	September 14	at Minnesota Vikings	W 28–14	Hubert H. Humphrey Metrodome	63,697	3–0
4	September 21	Miami Dolphins	W 31–21	Houlihan's Stadium	73,314	4–0
5	September 28	Arizona Cardinals*	W 19–18	Houlihan's Stadium	53,804	5–0
6	October 5	at Green Bay Packers	L 16–21	Lambeau Field	60,100	5–1
7	October 12	Detroit Lions*	L 9–27	Houlihan's Stadium	72,095	5–2
8	Bye					
9	October 26	Minnesota Vikings*	L 6–10	Houlihan's Stadium	66,815	5–3
10	November 2	at Indianapolis Colts	W 31–28	RCA Dome	58,512	6–3
11	November 9	at Atlanta Falcons	W 31–10	Georgia Dome	46,018	7–3
12	November 16	New England Patriots	W 27–7	Houlihan's Stadium	70,479	8–3
13	November 23	at Chicago Bears	L 7–13	Soldier Field	43,955	8–4
14	November 30	at New York Giants	W 20–8	Giants Stadium	68,678	9–4
15	December 7	Green Bay Packers	L 6–17	Houlihan's Stadium	73,523	9–5
16	December 14	at New York Jets	L 0–31	Giants Stadium	60,122	9–6
17	December 21	Chicago Bears	W 31–15	Houlihan's Stadium	70,930	10–6

- = blacked out locally

=== Standings ===
NFC Central
	W	L	T	PCT	PF	PA	STK
^{(2)} Green Bay Packers	13	3	0	.813	422	282	W5
^{(4)} Tampa Bay Buccaneers	10	6	0	.625	299	263	W1
^{(5)} Detroit Lions	9	7	0	.563	379	306	W2
^{(6)} Minnesota Vikings	9	7	0	.563	354	359	W1
Chicago Bears	4	12	0	.250	263	421	L1

== Game summaries ==
=== Week 1: San Francisco ===
The "new-look" Buccaneers opened the season against San Francisco. It was the first game for new 49ers head coach Steve Mariucci, and it was the start of the second season for Tampa Bay's Tony Dungy.

The Bucs defense sacked the 49ers seven times, and knocked both Steve Young and Jerry Rice out of the game. Early in the first quarter, Warren Sapp sacked Steve Young, who suffered a minor concussion. Later in the second quarter, Sapp tackled Rice on a busted reverse play. Rice tore his ACL and MCL in his left knee, sidelining him for 14 weeks.

Trailing 6–3 in the fourth quarter, Trent Dilfer faked a hand-off up the middle to Mike Alstott and rolled out to pass to a wide-open Dave Moore in the endzone. The Buccaneers won 13–6, and the victory was considered a "statement game" for the club, particularly on defense.

=== Week 2: at Detroit ===
Rookie Warrick Dunn rushed for 130 yards and one touchdown, as Tampa Bay won 24–17. The Buccaneers defense held Barry Sanders to only 20 yards rushing.

=== Week 3: at Minnesota ===
Warrick Dunn rushed for 101 yards (his second-consecutive 100-yard game), including a 52-yard touchdown in the fourth quarter as Tampa Bay won 28–14.

In the second quarter, Mike Alstott scored one of his most-memorable touchdowns with the club. At the one-yard line, a hand-off to Alstott up the middle saw him hit the pile and appear to be stopped short of the goal line. However, he bounced off the pile, did not have a knee down, escaped to the left, avoided three other tacklers, and powered his way into the endzone backwards.

=== Week 4: Miami ===
On Sunday Night Football, Tampa Bay hosted Miami. The Buccaneers jumped out to a 14–0 lead, with Trent Dilfer passing for 248 yards and four touchdowns. The Bucs defense intercepted Dan Marino twice.

With 9:30 left in the game, Tampa Bay led 24–14 facing a 3rd & 28 at their own 42-yard line. Dilfer completed a screen pass to Warrick Dunn, who weaved through and broke away for a 58-yard touchdown, putting the game out-of-reach.

=== Week 5: Arizona ===
The Buccaneers offense sputtered, but the defense did enough to keep Tampa Bay in the game. Alshermond Singleton blocked a punt and recovered it for a touchdown. With less than five minutes left in the fourth quarter, Karl Williams scored a go-ahead 31-yard touchdown on fourth down. With Tampa Bay leading 19–18, Arizona drove to the Tampa Bay 29-yard line in the closing seconds. Cardinals kicker Kevin Butler missed a 47-yard field goal wide right, and the Buccaneers held on to start the season 5–0.

This would be Ronde Barber's first regular season game with the Buccaneers. The 5–0 start matched the franchise best set in 1979.

=== Week 6: at Green Bay ===
Green Bay jumped out to a 21–3 lead, but Tampa Bay rallied to make the score 21–16 late in the game. A last-minute drive failed when Trent Dilfer threw incomplete to Warrick Dunn on 4th down at the Packers 48-yard line.

=== Week 7: Detroit ===
Barry Sanders rushed for 215 yards, and Scott Mitchell passed for 222 yards as Detroit rolled over Tampa Bay by a score of 27–9. Sanders had rushing touchdowns of 80 yards and 82 yards respectively, the first time in NFL history a single player had two rushes of over 80 yards in a single game.

=== Week 8: Open date ===
Tampa Bay had their bye in week 8.

=== Week 9: Minnesota ===
The first half was scoreless. Late in the third quarter, Minnesota had a 57-yard punt return which set up the first touchdown of the game. The Vikings held on to win 10–6.

=== Week 10: at Indianapolis ===
After a three-game losing streak, Tampa Bay got back to their winning ways. Tied 28–28 with 1:03 to go, Karl Williams returned a punt to the Colts 45-yard line. That set up a game-winning field goal by Michael Husted with 8 seconds remaining in regulation. Tampa Bay won 31–28, and improved to 6–3.

=== Week 11: at Atlanta ===
Tampa Bay had 199 yards of rushing, and the special teams recovered two punt fumbles by the Falcons. Tampa Bay won 31–10, and improved to 4–0 in dome stadiums for the season. At 7–3, they were one game behind Green Bay and Minnesota for the lead in the NFC Central.

=== Week 12: New England ===
Tampa Bay jumped out to a 27–0 lead by the third quarter, and the Patriots did not even have a first down until the second half. Mike Alstott rushed for 91 yards and one touchdown.

=== Week 13: at Chicago ===
Two turnovers by Tampa Bay in the first half allowed the Bears to jump out to a 10–0 lead at halftime. Mike Alstott fumbled on the first play of the game, and Karl Williams muffed a punt at the four-yard line with seconds remaining in the second quarter. The Bears won 13–7.

=== Week 14: at N.Y. Giants ===
Tampa Bay guaranteed their first winning season in 15 years, defeating the New York Giants. The game was iced in the fourth quarter when the Giants (trailing 14–8) went for it on a 4th down & 1. John Lynch stuffed Tyrone Wheatley for no gain, and Tampa Bay would go on to win 20–8.

=== Week 15: Green Bay ===
Green Bay defeated Tampa Bay 17–6, and the Packers clinched the NFC Central title. The Buccaneers were held without a touchdown for the first time all season, and would need a victory in the last two weeks to secure a wild card spot for the playoffs.

=== Week 16: at N.Y. Jets ===
Jets Otis Smith returned two interceptions for touchdowns (45 yards and 51 yards respectively) and Leon Johnson ran for a 101-yard kickoff return touchdown. The Tampa Bay offense, minus an injured Mike Alstott, went 0 for 13 on third down conversions.

Tampa Bay was crushed 31–0. However, when the 4 o'clock games were decided, Tampa Bay mathematically clinched a wild card berth for the playoffs.

=== Week 17: Chicago ===
The final regular season game at Tampa Stadium saw Tampa Bay take on division rival Chicago, with playoff seeding on the line. A win by Tampa Bay would clinch the #4 seed in the playoffs, and secure a home game for the wild card round.

Karl Williams scored a dramatic 61-yard punt return touchdown at the end of the first quarter, en route to a 21–3 halftime lead. Tampa Bay padded the lead in the second half, particularly with Warrick Dunn's 119 yards rushing.

Tampa Bay won 31–15, won the final regular season game at Tampa Stadium, and secured a home game against Detroit for the wild card playoffs. In only head coach Tony Dungy's second season, the Buccaneers had a winning record and a return to the postseason.

=== NFC Wild Card Game: Detroit Lions ===
The Buccaneers won their first playoff game since 1979, in what turned out to be their final game at Houlihan's Stadium. Tampa Bay built a 20–0 lead midway through the third quarter. Quarterback Trent Dilfer threw a 9-yard touchdown pass to receiver Horace Copeland, running back Mike Alstott had a 31-yard touchdown run, and Michael Husted made two field goals. The Bucs defense limited Lions quarterback Scott Mitchell to just 10 of 25 completions for 78 yards, and running back Barry Sanders to 18 carries for 65 yards. Frank Reich replaced Mitchell after he suffered a concussion late in the third quarter. Detroit then scored 10 points to cut the lead in half midway through the fourth quarter, with Jason Hanson's 33-yard field goal and Tommy Vardell's 1-yard touchdown run. But the comeback was short-lived when, after completing a long pass on third down during the final minutes of the game, Reich accidentally spiked the ball on fourth down, giving the ball to Tampa Bay.

=== NFC Divisional Playoffs: at Green Bay Packers ===
Packers running back Dorsey Levens rushed for a team playoff record of 112 yards and a touchdown while also catching 4 passes for 29 yards as the Green Bay defense held Tampa Bay to 90 rushing yards and intercepted 2 passes from Trent Dilfer, who finished the game with only 11 of 36 completions for 200 yards.

Early in the game, Tampa Bay had a chance to score first, but Packers defensive tackle Bob Kuberski blocked Michael Husted's 43-yard field goal attempt. Green Bay then drove for the first touchdown of the game with Brett Favre's 3-yard touchdown pass to tight end Mark Chmura. Early in the second quarter, Packers receiver Robert Brooks' 28-yard punt return and 21-yard reception set up a field goal by Ryan Longwell. And later on, defensive back Tyrone Williams intercepted a pass from Dilfer and returned it 14 yards, setting up Longwell's second field goal with six seconds left in the half, making the score 13–0.

Green Bay receiver Antonio Freeman returned the second half kickoff 90 yards for a touchdown, but a holding penalty on Darren Sharper eliminated the score and moved the ball all the way back to their own 11-yard line. Green Bay still managed to drive into scoring range, but on the eighth play of the drive, Bucs defensive back Donnie Abraham intercepted a pass from Favre on the Tampa Bay 6-yard line. Dilfer subsequently led the Bucs offense 94 yards in 8 plays to score on fullback Mike Alstott's 6-yard touchdown run, cutting the score to 13–7. But two possessions later, the Packers drove 54 yards and scored with a 2-yard touchdown run by Levens. Then, Favre closed out the scoring by running in the 2-point conversion on a quarterback draw.

== Playoffs ==
Week	Date	Opponent	Result	Stadium	Attendance
Wild Card	December 28, 1997	Detroit Lions	W 20–10	Houlihan's Stadium	73,361
Divisional	January 4, 1998	at Green Bay Packers	L 21–7	Lambeau Field	60,327
