= Derrick Brooks =

American football player and executive (born 1973)

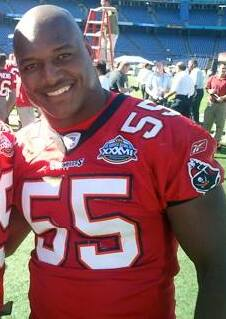
- Brooks wearing his Super Bowl XXXVII jersey in 2003

South Florida Bulls
- Title: Chief operating officer

Personal information
- Born: April 18, 1973 (age 53); Pensacola, Florida, U.S.
- Listed height: 6 ft 0 in (1.83 m)
- Listed weight: 235 lb (107 kg)

Career information
- Position: Linebacker (No. 55)
- High school: Booker T. Washington (Pensacola)
- College: Florida State (1991–1994)
- NFL draft: 1995: 1st round, 28th overall pick

Career history

Playing
- Tampa Bay Buccaneers (1995–2008)

Operations
- Tampa Bay Storm (2011–2017) Co-owner & president; South Florida Bulls (2025–present) Chief operating officer

Awards and highlights
- Super Bowl champion (XXXVII); NFL Defensive Player of the Year (2002); Walter Payton NFL Man of the Year (2000); 5× First-team All-Pro (1999, 2000, 2002, 2004, 2005); 4× Second-team All-Pro (1997, 1998, 2001, 2003); 11× Pro Bowl (1997–2006, 2008); 3× NFL solo tackles leader (1998, 2000, 2004); NFL combined tackles leader (1998); NFL 2000s All-Decade Team; NFL 100th Anniversary All-Time Team; PFWA All-Rookie Team (1995); Tampa Bay Buccaneers Ring of Honor; Tampa Bay Buccaneers No. 55 retired; National champion (1993); Jack Lambert Trophy (1994) (Note: Co-winner with Dana Howard.); Unanimous All-American (1993); Consensus All-American (1994); ACC Defensive Player of the Year (1993); 3× First-team All-ACC (1992–1994); Florida State Seminoles Jersey No. 10 honored

Career NFL statistics
- Tackles: 1,713
- Sacks: 13.5
- Forced fumbles: 24
- Fumble recoveries: 4
- Passes defended: 84
- Interceptions: 25
- Defensive touchdowns: 7
- Stats at Pro Football Reference
- Pro Football Hall of Fame
- College Football Hall of Fame

Derrick Dewan Brooks (born April 18, 1973) is an American former professional football player who was a linebacker for his entire 14-year career in the National Football League (NFL) with the Tampa Bay Buccaneers. Brooks played college football for the Florida State Seminoles, earning consensus All-American honors twice. He was selected by the Buccaneers in the first round of the 1995 NFL draft. An 11-time Pro Bowl selection and five-time first-team All-Pro, Brooks was the NFL Defensive Player of the Year in 2002 en route to winning the franchise's first Super Bowl title in Super Bowl XXXVII. He was inducted to the Pro Football Hall of Fame in 2014 and the College Football Hall of Fame in 2016.

Following his retirement, Brooks served as co-owner and president of the Tampa Bay Storm in the Arena Football League (AFL) from 2011 to 2017. In 2025, he became the chief operating officer for the South Florida Bulls athletics program.

== Early life ==
Brooks attended Washington High School in Pensacola, Florida. In his senior season in 1991, Brooks carried Pensacola to the state playoff semifinals, where they lost to the eventual champion Manatee Hurricanes of Bradenton, Florida. In 2007, he was named to the Florida High School Athletic Association All-Century Team, which selected the Top 33 players in the 100-year history of high school football in the state of Florida's history.

== College career ==
While attending Florida State University, he played for the Seminoles from 1991 to 1994. He was a four-year letterman, a consensus first-team All-American his junior and senior years, and a three-time first-team All-Atlantic Coast Conference (ACC) selection. After playing as safety as a freshman he switched to linebacker as a sophomore. He was a member of the 1993 Seminoles National Championship team. He finished his career with 274 tackles, five interceptions, 8.5 sacks, 13 passes defensed, four forced fumbles, and three fumble recoveries.

In November 2010, Florida State retired Seminoles jersey number 10 in honor of Brooks.

== Professional career ==
Pre-draft measurables
Height	Weight	Arm length	Hand span	40-yard dash	10-yard split	20-yard split
6 ft 0 1/4 in (1.84 m)	229 lb (104 kg)	32 1/2 in (0.83 m)	10 3/4 in (0.27 m)	4.71 s	1.70 s	2.72 s
All values from NFL Combine

=== Early career (1995–2001) ===
The Tampa Bay Buccaneers selected Brooks in the first round (28th overall) of the 1995 NFL draft. The Buccaneers traded both of their second-round picks (46th overall and 63rd overall) to the Dallas Cowboys for their first-round pick (28th overall) and used the pick to draft Brooks. Brooks was the second linebacker drafted in 1995 NFL Draft, behind Washington State's Mark Fields (13th overall).

Brooks played 14 years for the Buccaneers and is widely considered one of the best players in franchise history and one of the best linebackers in NFL history. From 1995 to 2008, Brooks started 221 of 224 games, recording 1,698 tackles, 13.5 sacks, 25 interceptions, and six touchdowns (tied for the most in NFL history by a linebacker with Bobby Bell). He was selected to the Pro Bowl 11 times, including 10 straight from 1997 to 2006, was an All-Pro nine times, was the AP NFL Defensive Player of the Year in 2002, and led the team to the franchise's first Super Bowl win in Super Bowl XXXVII.

As a rookie in 1995, Brooks started 13 of 16 games. He finished the season with 78 tackles with a sack and earned first-team all-rookie honors from Pro Football Weekly and Pro Football Writers Association. During his second season 1996, he started all 16 games and finished with a team-leading 132 tackles and his first career interception. In 1997, Brooks earned his first trip to the Pro Bowl after recording 144 tackles, 1.5 sacks, and two interceptions in 16 games. In 1998, Brooks had another Pro Bowl season after recording 156 tackles and an interception.

In 1999, Brooks made the Pro Bowl for the third time and was a first-team All-Pro selection for the first time in his career. For the season, he had 153 tackles, two sacks, and four interceptions. In 2000, Brooks earned his fourth consecutive trip to the Pro Bowl and his second consecutive first-team All-Pro selection. He finished the season with 140 tackles, a sack, and had his first career touchdown on a 34-yard interception from Minnesota Vikings quarterback Daunte Culpepper. Brooks was also, along with Jim Flanigan of the Chicago Bears, the winner of the Walter Payton Man of the Year Award, given to a National Football League player for his community service activities as well as his excellence on the field. Brooks made his fifth consecutive Pro Bowl in 2001 after recording 112 tackles and three interceptions.

=== Continued success and Super Bowl victory (2002–2008) ===
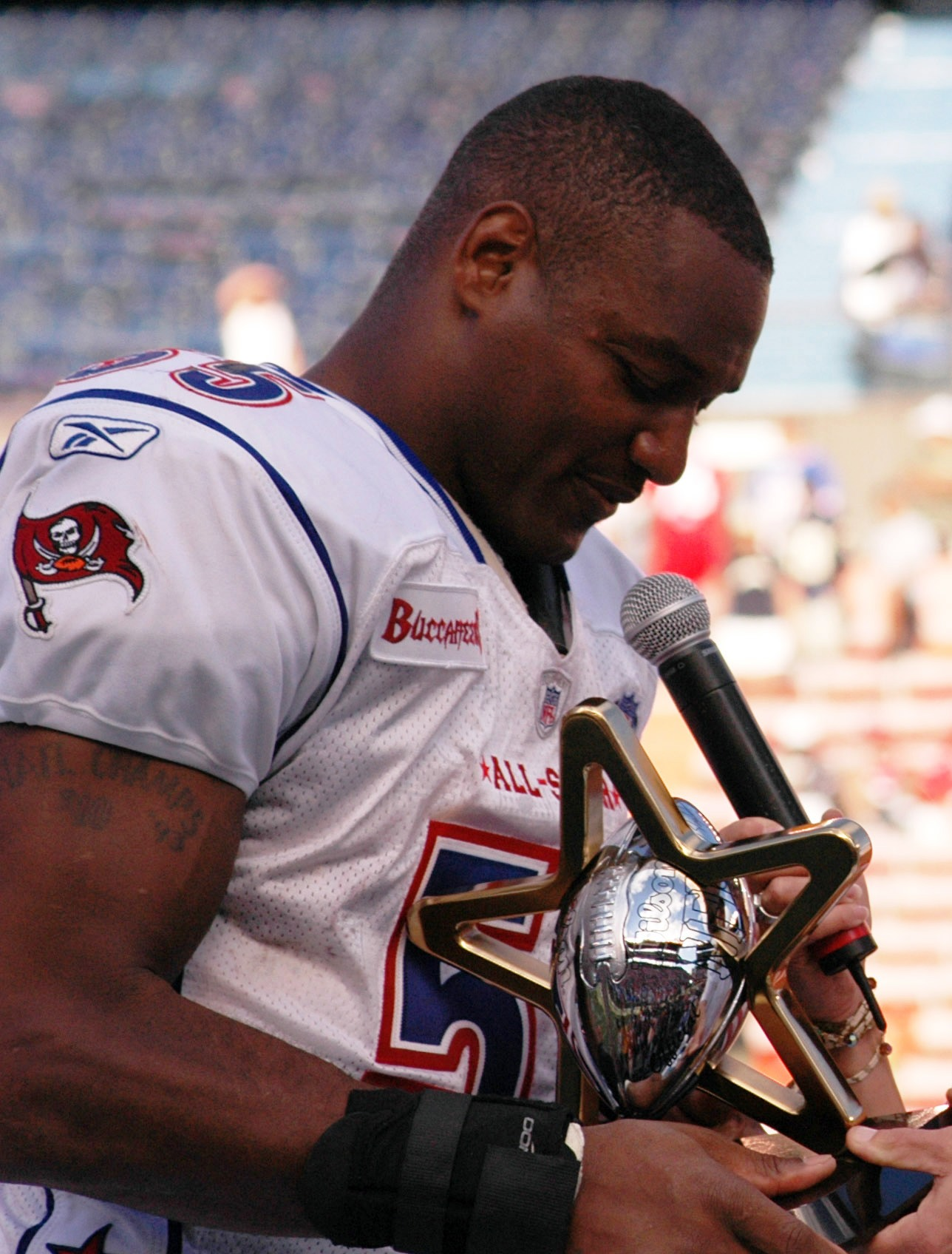
Brooks holding the 2006 Pro Bowl MVP trophy

Brooks' best season came in 2002. During that year he was named NFL Defensive Player of the Year by the Associated Press and helped the Buccaneers win the franchise's first Super Bowl. He also made his sixth consecutive Pro Bowl and was a first-team All-Pro selection for the third time. For the season he had 117 tackles, a sack, five interceptions, and returned an NFL record, for a linebacker, four touchdowns (one off a fumble and three off interceptions). During the Buccaneers 48–21 victory over the Oakland Raiders in Super Bowl XXXVII, he returned an interception off of Raiders quarterback Rich Gannon 44 yards for the clinching touchdown.

In 2003, Brooks broke Lee Roy Selmon's team record for most consecutive Pro Bowl appearances with seven. He finished the season with 101 tackles, a sack, two interceptions, and returned an interception for a touchdown. In 2004, Brooks made his eighth consecutive Pro Bowl and fifth- first-team All-Pro selection after recording 137 tackles, three sacks, and an interception. In 2005, Brooks made his ninth consecutive Pro Bowl and earned his sixth first-team All-Pro selection. He finished the season with 125 tackles, three sacks, and an interception.

In Brooks' 10th consecutive Pro Bowl in 2006, he was named the MVP after returning a Trent Green interception 59 yards for a touchdown to secure the victory for the NFC. During the regular season he had 121 tackles, three interceptions and a touchdown. In 2007, Brooks had 109 tackles and was not voted to the Pro Bowl for the first time since 1996. In Brooks' last year with the Buccaneers in 2008, he recorded 73 tackles and an interception and was selected to his 11th Pro Bowl. The 11 Pro Bowls are tied for second-most by a linebacker in NFL history.

=== Tampa Bay exit and retirement ===
On February 25, 2009, the Buccaneers released Brooks. He was one of five veterans that the Bucs released on that day. The others were wide receivers Joey Galloway and Ike Hilliard, running back Warrick Dunn and linebacker Cato June. The Bucs had previously fired head coach Jon Gruden and general manager Bruce Allen and were looking to build a younger team under the likes of Raheem Morris and Mark Dominik. Brooks never missed a game in his 14 years in Tampa Bay, a total of 224 consecutive games. He was the starting weakside linebacker for the last 208 of those games, an NFL record for that position and the second-longest consecutive start streak for any linebacker in NFL history.

After spending all of the 2009 season as a free agent, Brooks officially announced his retirement on August 11, 2010.

On January 10, 2014, Brooks was named among the 15 modern-era Pro Football Hall of Fame finalists. Former Buccaneers safety John Lynch (who was Brooks's teammate from 1995 to 2003) and former Buccaneers head coach Tony Dungy (who coached Brooks from 1996 to 2001) were also finalists. On February 1, Brooks was elected to the Hall of Fame in his first year of eligibility. He is the third Hall of Famer to have earned his credentials primarily as a Buccaneer, the others being Lee Roy Selmon and Warren Sapp (Brooks's teammate from 1995 to 2003).

== NFL career statistics ==
Legend
	AP NFL Defensive Player of the Year
	Won the Super Bowl
	Led the league
**Bold**	Career high
Underline	Incomplete data

=== Regular season ===
Year	Team	Games		Tackles						Interceptions						Fumbles				
Year	Team	GP	GS	Cmb	Solo	Ast	TFL	QBH	Sck	PD	Int	Yds	Y/I	Lng	TD	FF	FR	Yds	Y/F	TD
1995	TB	16	13	79	60	19	—	—	1.0	4	0	0	—	0	0	2	0	0	—	0
1996	TB	16	16	133	92	41	—	—	0.0	11	1	6	6.0	6	0	1	0	0	—	0
1997	TB	16	16	145	102	**43**	—	—	1.5	12	2	13	6.5	13	0	1	1	0	0.0	0
1998	TB	16	16	**158**	**123**	35	—	—	0.0	6	1	25	25.0	25	0	2	0	0	—	0
1999	TB	16	16	153	119	34	**14**	—	2.0	**18**	4	61	15.3	38	0	2	**2**	4	2.0	0
2000	TB	16	16	146	**123**	23	13	—	1.0	6	1	34	34.0	34	1	**5**	0	0	—	0
2001	TB	16	16	113	80	33	4	—	0.0	11	3	65	21.7	53	0	1	0	0	—	0
2002	TB	16	16	118	88	30	7	—	1.0	11	**5**	**218**	**43.6**	**97**	**3**	1	1	**11**	**11.0**	**1**
2003	TB	16	16	103	73	30	3	—	1.0	9	2	56	28.0	44	1	2	0	0	—	0
2004	TB	16	16	137	109	28	4	—	**3.0**	6	1	3	3.0	3	0	2	0	0	—	0
2005	TB	16	16	125	93	32	10	—	**3.0**	11	1	0	0.0	0	0	1	0	0	—	0
2006	TB	16	16	121	96	25	4	0	0.0	4	3	51	17.0	21	1	0	0	0	—	0
2007	TB	16	16	109	84	25	2	**1**	0.0	1	0	0	—	0	0	3	0	0	—	0
2008	TB	16	16	73	58	15	7	0	0.0	7	1	–2	–2.0	–2	0	1	0	0	—	0
Career		224	221	1,713	1,300	413	68	1	13.5	112	25	530	21.2	97	6	24	4	15	3.8	1

=== Postseason ===
Year	Team	Games		Tackles					Interceptions						Fumbles				
Year	Team	GP	GS	Cmb	Solo	Ast	TFL	Sck	PD	Int	Yds	Y/I	Lng	TD	FF	FR	Yds	Y/F	TD
1997	TB	2	2	14	13	1	—	0.0	0	0	0	—	0	0	0	0	0	—	0
1999	TB	2	2	**24**	**21**	3	**5**	0.0	0	0	0	—	0	0	0	0	0	—	0
2000	TB	1	1	7	4	3	0	0.0	0	0	0	—	0	0	0	0	0	—	0
2001	TB	1	1	9	5	**4**	2	0.0	0	0	0	—	0	0	0	0	0	—	0
2002	TB	3	3	17	13	**4**	2	**0.5**	**3**	**2**	**44**	**22.0**	**44**	**1**	0	**1**	0	**0.0**	0
2005	TB	1	1	8	6	2	1	0.0	0	0	0	—	0	0	**1**	0	0	—	0
2007	TB	1	1	11	8	3	0	0.0	0	0	0	—	0	0	0	0	0	—	0
Career		11	11	90	70	20	10	0.5	3	2	44	22.0	44	1	1	1	0	0.0	0

== Career highlights ==
NFL

- Super Bowl champion (XXXVII)
- NFL Defensive Player of the Year (2002)
- Walter Payton NFL Man of the Year (2000)
- 5× First-team All-Pro (1999, 2000, 2002, 2004, 2005)
- 4× Second-team All-Pro (1997, 1998, 2001, 2003)
- 11× Pro Bowl (1997–2006, 2008)
- Pro Bowl MVP (2005)
- 3× NFL solo tackles leader (1998, 2000, 2004)
- NFL combined tackles leader (1998)
- NFL 2000s All-Decade Team
- NFL 100th Anniversary All-Time Team
- No. 97 on The Top 100: NFL's Greatest Players
- PFWA All-Rookie Team (1995)
- Tampa Bay Buccaneers Ring of Honor
- Tampa Bay Buccaneers No. 55 retired
- Bart Starr Award (2004)

College

- National champion (1993)
- Jack Lambert Trophy (1994) (Note: Co-winner with Dana Howard.)
- Unanimous All-American (1993)
- Consensus All-American (1994)
- ACC Defensive Player of the Year (1993)
- 3× First-team All-ACC (1992–1994)
- 2× Vince Lombardi Award finalist (1993, 1994)
- Florida State Seminoles Jersey No. 10 honored

== Broadcast and executive career ==
Brooks previously was a football analyst for ESPN and co-host of The Red Zone on Sirius NFL Radio and as an analyst on ESPN First Take.

In 2011, Brooks became a part owner and the team president for the Tampa Bay Storm of the Arena Football League. The team folded in December 2017.

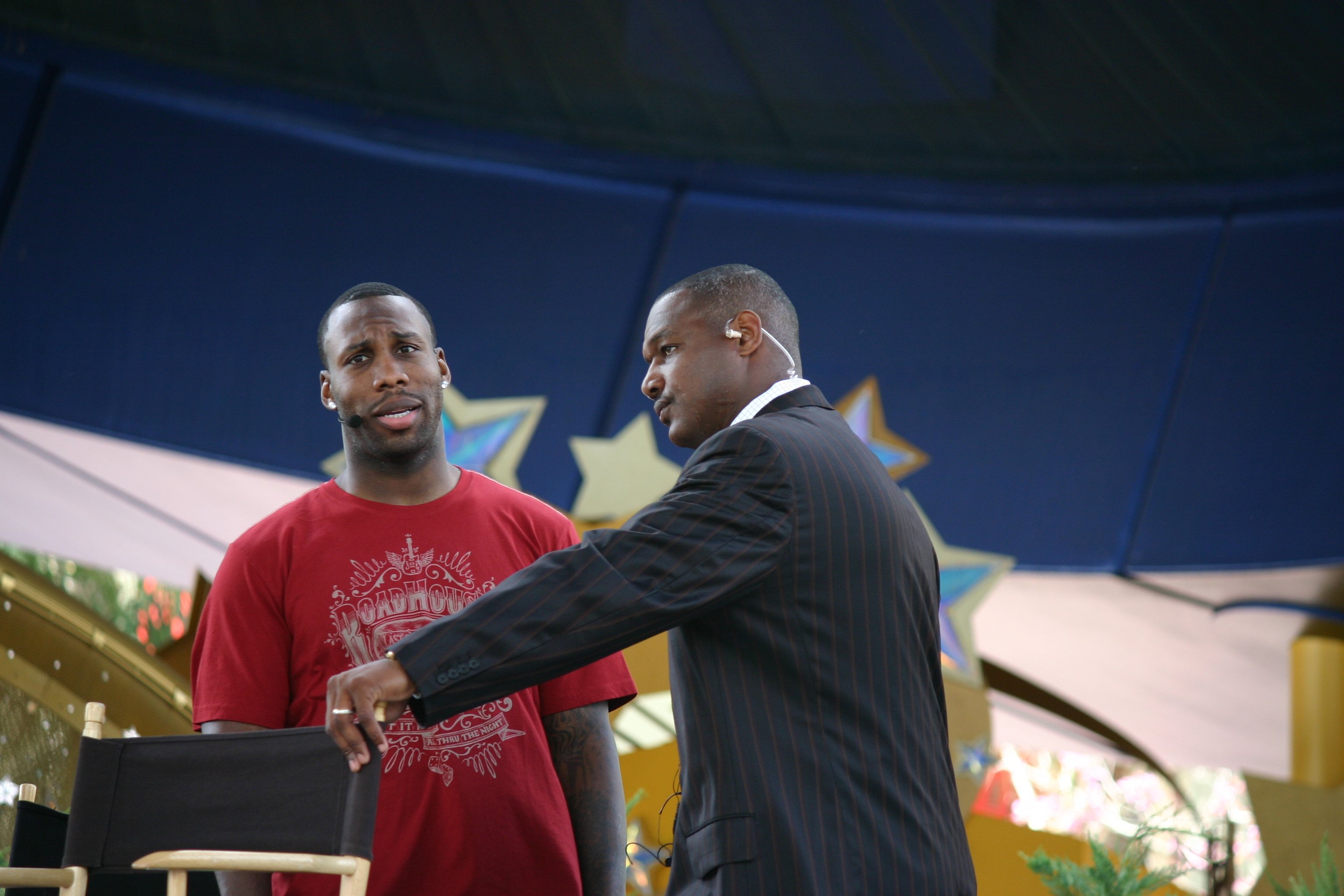
Derrick Brooks, with Anquan Boldin

Since 2014, Brooks has served as a jointly-appointed appeals officer for the NFL and NFL Players Association, charged with reviewing discipline for in-game misconduct.

On October 30, 2025, the South Florida Bulls announced Brooks' appointment as chief operating officer for the school's athletic program.

== Personal life ==
Brooks is married and has four children. Brooks is a Christian.

Brooks is the founder of Derrick Brooks Charities. He has taken local youth across the nation and South Africa with the objective of presenting a first-hand experience, or a "mobile classroom," this group is known as the Brooks Bunch. Brooks also headed the founding of the Brooks-DeBartolo Collegiate High School in Tampa with fellow Pro Football Hall of Fame member Edward J. DeBartolo Jr.

Brooks is well known for his charity work and his advocacy of the importance of education. He was the co-recipient of the 2000 Walter Payton Man of the Year Award and was named to the Florida State University Board of Trustees in 2003 by Governor Jeb Bush.
