= Mike Alstott =

American football player (born 1973)

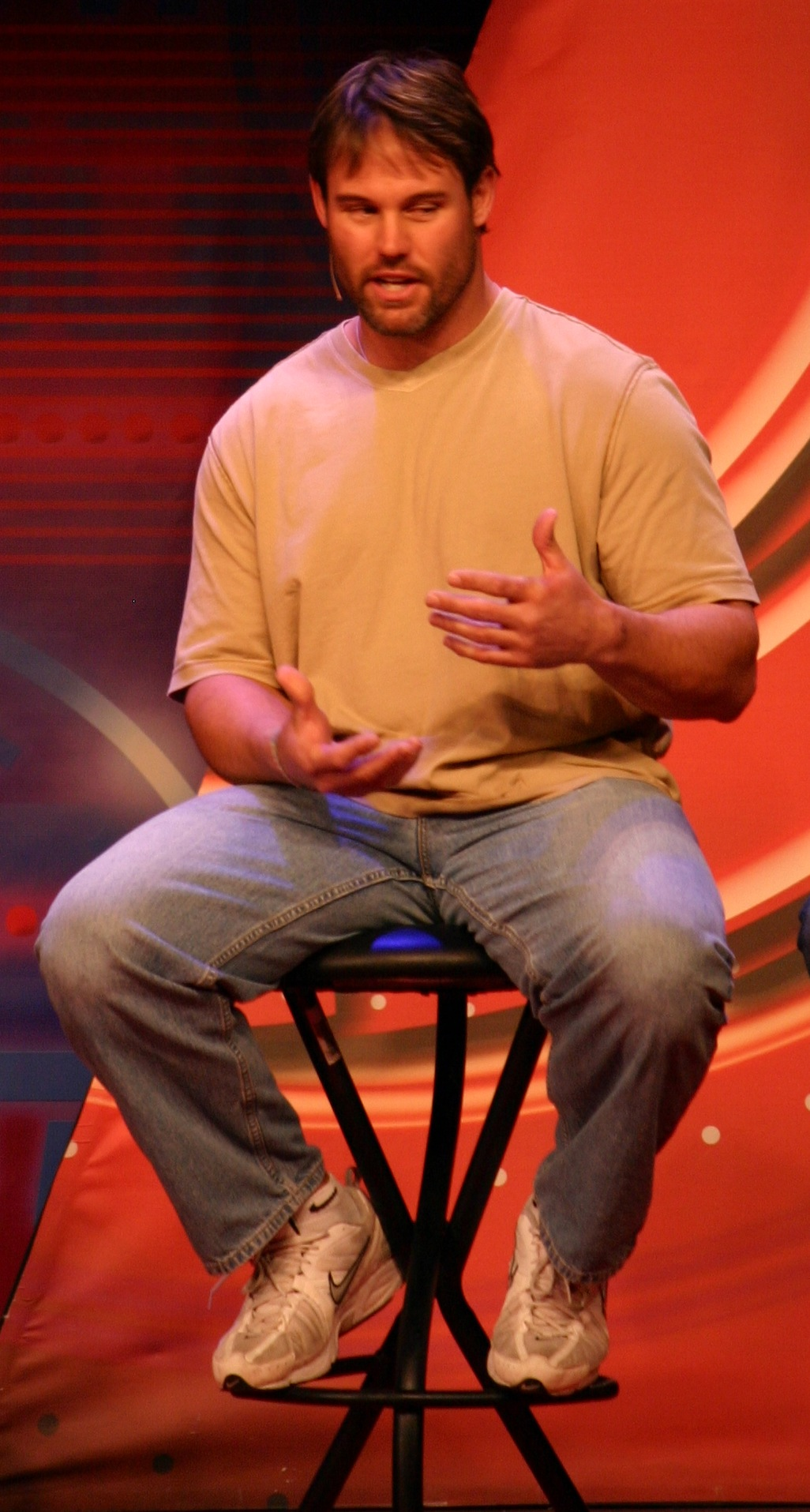
- Alstott in 2010

No. 40
- Position: Fullback

Personal information
- Born: December 21, 1973 (age 52); Joliet, Illinois, U.S.
- Listed height: 6 ft 1 in (1.85 m)
- Listed weight: 248 lb (112 kg)

Career information
- High school: Joliet Catholic
- College: Purdue (1992–1995)
- NFL draft: 1996: 2nd round, 35th overall pick

Career history
- Tampa Bay Buccaneers (1996–2007)

Awards and highlights
- Super Bowl champion (XXXVII); 3× First-team All-Pro (1997–1999); Second-Team All-Pro (1996); 6× Pro Bowl (1997–2002); Tampa Bay Buccaneers Ring of Honor; Third-team All-American (1995); 2× Second-team All-Big Ten (1994, 1995); Purdue Intercollegiate Athletics Hall of Fame; Indiana Football Hall of Fame (2014)

Career NFL statistics
- Rushing yards: 5,088
- Rushing average: 3.7
- Rushing touchdowns: 58
- Receptions: 305
- Receiving yards: 2,284
- Receiving touchdowns: 13
- Stats at Pro Football Reference

Michael Joseph Alstott (born December 21, 1973) is an American former professional fullback who played in the National Football League (NFL) for 12 seasons with the Tampa Bay Buccaneers. Nicknamed "A-Train", he is regarded as one of the greatest fullbacks of all time.

Alstott played college football for the Purdue Boilermakers, earning third-team All-American honors in 1995, and was selected by the Buccaneers in the second round of the 1996 NFL draft. He received six Pro Bowl and three first-team All-Pro selections, in addition to being a member of the Buccaneers team that won the franchise's first Super Bowl title in Super Bowl XXXVII. For his accomplishments in Tampa Bay, he was inducted to the Buccaneers Ring of Honor in 2015.

== College career ==
Alstott attended Purdue University for four years, where he became the first player in school history named MVP in three consecutive seasons. Alstott scored 12 touchdowns as a sophomore, 14 as a junior, and 11 as a senior, and held the Purdue rushing touchdown record with 39 until Kory Sheets broke it in 2008. He averaged 5.6 yards per attempt during his Purdue career before graduating in 1995 with a bachelor's degree in business. He finished as Purdue's all-time leading rusher with 3,635 yards, including a school-best 1,436 yards in 1995.

== Professional career ==
Pre-draft measurables
Height	Weight	Arm length	Hand span	40-yard dash	10-yard split	20-yard split	20-yard shuttle	Vertical jump	Broad jump	Bench press
6 ft 0 3/8 in (1.84 m)	240 lb (109 kg)	31 1/2 in (0.80 m)	9 7/8 in (0.25 m)	4.68 s	1.65 s	2.73 s	4.16 s	33.0 in (0.84 m)	9 ft 9 in (2.97 m)	24 reps
All values from NFL Combine

Alstott was selected in the second round (35th overall) of the 1996 NFL draft by the Tampa Bay Buccaneers. Prior to the draft, the Pittsburgh Steelers were considered the favorites to draft Alstott as a possible replacement for Bam Morris (and more long-term Barry Foster) following Morris' marijuana possession arrest, but were able to execute the draft-day trade for Jerome Bettis before the Steelers turn at 29th overall. Both then-new Buccaneers head coach Tony Dungy and Steelers head coach Bill Cowher, coincidentally, were former assistants to Marty Schottenheimer and all three believed in strong running games.

The Buccaneers utilized Alstott primarily as a running fullback at a time when most NFL teams used their fullbacks as lead blockers. He was a member of the Tampa Bay Buccaneers team that won Super Bowl XXXVII (2002), played at Qualcomm Stadium in San Diego, California. Alstott rushed for 15 yards and the first Super Bowl touchdown in Tampa Bay Buccaneers history. He also caught five passes for 43 yards.

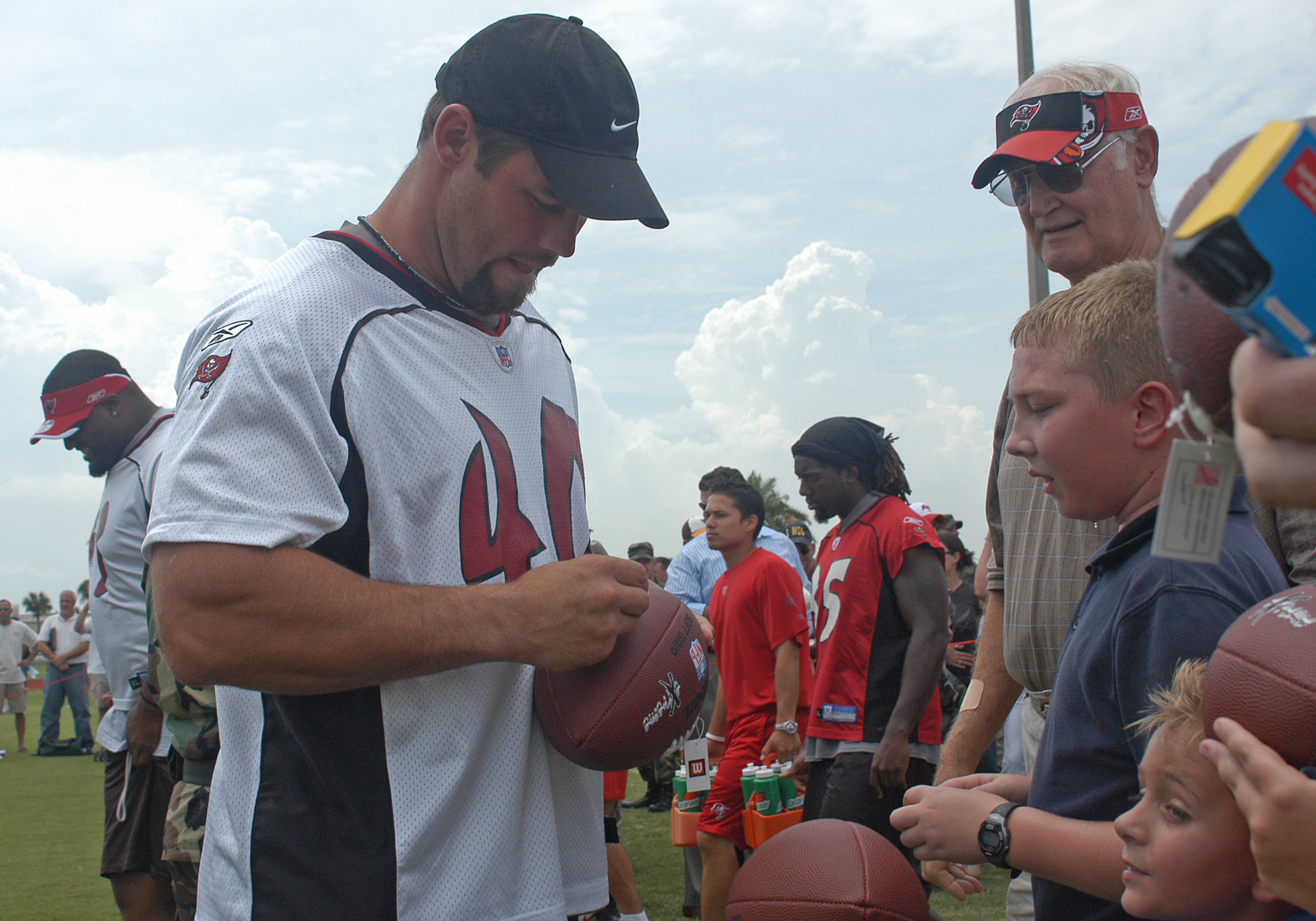
Alstott signing autographs as a member of the Buccaneers in 2006.

Alstott signed a one-year contract to stay in Tampa Bay for the 2005 season, and signed a similar contract at the conclusion of the 2006 season after contemplating retirement. However, he spent all of the 2007 season on injured reserve because of neck problems, leading to his retirement on January 24, 2008.

In the summer of 2007, shortly before he suffered his season-ending and ultimately career-ending neck injury, Alstott appeared in a television commercial for ESPN Fantasy Football along with former teammate Warrick Dunn, who was later signed by the Falcons.

He was ranked No. 10 on the NFL Network's "Top Ten Power Backs".

With 71 total touchdowns as a Buccaneer, Alstott broke the previous franchise record of 46 by running back James Wilder when he scored his 47th career TD on November 26, 2001. Alstott remained the Buccaneers' all-time leading touchdown scorer until November 22, 2021, when wide receiver Mike Evans scored his 72nd TD as a Buccaneer.

== NFL career statistics ==
Rushing statistics

Year	Team	GP	GS	Att	Yards	Avg	Lng	TD	FD	Fum	Lost
1996	TB	16	16	96	377	3.9	39	3	21	2	1
1997	TB	15	15	176	665	3.8	47	7	34	4	3
1998	TB	16	16	215	846	3.9	37	8	49	4	4
1999	TB	16	16	242	949	3.9	30	7	47	6	6
2000	TB	13	13	131	465	3.6	20	5	37	3	2
2001	TB	16	16	165	680	4.1	39	11	40	0	0
2002	TB	16	9	146	548	3.8	32	5	37	2	1
2003	TB	4	3	27	77	2.9	29	2	10	0	0
2004	TB	14	11	67	230	3.4	32	2	20	1	1
2005	TB	16	7	34	80	2.4	9	6	12	0	0
2006	TB	16	15	60	171	2.9	17	3	17	1	1
Total		158	137	1,359	5,088	3.7	47	58	324	23	19

Receiving statistics

Year	Team	GP	GS	Rec	Yards	Avg	Lng	TD	FD	Fum	Lost
1996	TB	16	16	65	557	8.6	29	3	28	2	1
1997	TB	15	15	23	178	7.7	26	3	13	1	0
1998	TB	16	16	22	152	6.9	26	1	7	1	1
1999	TB	16	16	27	239	8.9	24	2	11	0	0
2000	TB	13	13	13	93	7.2	21	0	3	0	0
2001	TB	16	16	35	231	6.6	19	1	9	2	2
2002	TB	16	9	35	242	6.9	44	2	11	2	1
2003	TB	4	3	10	83	8.3	17	0	3	0	0
2004	TB	14	11	29	202	7.0	20	0	11	1	1
2005	TB	16	7	25	222	8.9	24	1	11	0	0
2006	TB	16	15	21	85	4.0	18	0	6	0	0
Total		158	137	305	2,284	7.5	44	13	113	9	6

== Personal life ==
Alstott and his ex-wife, Nicole Alstott, have three children. His son Griffin was a quarterback at Western Michigan from 2018 to 2020, after spending the 2017 season at Purdue.
