= Bert Emanuel =

American football player (born 1970)

No. 87, 17, 83
- Position: Wide receiver

Personal information
- Born: October 26, 1970 (age 56); Kansas City, Missouri, U.S.
- Listed height: 5 ft 10 in (1.78 m)
- Listed weight: 185 lb (84 kg)

Career information
- High school: Langham Creek (Houston, Texas)
- College: UCLA (1989–1990); Rice (1991–1993)
- NFL draft: 1994: 2nd round, 45th overall pick

Career history
- Atlanta Falcons (1994–1997); Tampa Bay Buccaneers (1998–1999); Miami Dolphins (2000); New England Patriots (2001); Detroit Lions (2001)

Awards and highlights
- First-team All-SWC (1992)

Career NFL statistics
- Receptions: 351
- Receiving yards: 4,852
- Receiving touchdowns: 28
- Stats at Pro Football Reference

Bert Tyrone Emanuel (born October 26, 1970) is an American former professional football player who was a wide receiver in the National Football League (NFL). He was selected by the Atlanta Falcons in the second round of the 1994 NFL draft, 45th overall and the Falcons' first pick in the draft. He also played for the Tampa Bay Buccaneers, Miami Dolphins, New England Patriots, and Detroit Lions.

Emanuel played quarterback in college. He spent two seasons as a backup for the UCLA Bruins before transferring to the Rice Owls and starting at quarterback in his junior and senior seasons.

== "The Bert Emanuel Rule" ==
While playing for the Tampa Bay Buccaneers against the St. Louis Rams in the 1999 NFC Championship Game, Emanuel made a 13-yard reception at the Rams' 22 yard line with 47 seconds remaining in the game. The Buccaneers, trailing 11–6, called a quick timeout, and the reception would have given Tampa Bay a realistic chance to continue a potential game-winning drive. The ruling on the field initially was a complete pass. Despite the fact that Emanuel apparently controlled the ball at every point during the catch, booth replay official Jerry Markbreit ordered a review of the call. Referee Bill Carollo determined that the nose of the ball had touched the ground as he brought it into his body. The catch was overturned, and Tampa Bay went on to lose the game, 11–6.

The ensuing controversy prompted the NFL to clarify the rule regarding what constitutes a valid pass reception. This would come to be known as "The Bert Emanuel Rule."

Pre-draft measurables
Height	Weight	Arm length	Hand span	40-yard dash	10-yard split	20-yard split	20-yard shuttle	Vertical jump
5 ft 10 3/8 in (1.79 m)	171 lb (78 kg)	30 5/8 in (0.78 m)	8 1/4 in (0.21 m)	4.59 s	1.62 s	2.68 s	3.98 s	37.0 in (0.94 m)

== NFL career statistics ==
Legend
	Super Bowl champion
	Led the league
**Bold**	Career high

Year	Team	Games		Receiving				
Year	Team	GP	GS	Rec	Yds	Avg	Lng	TD
1994	ATL	16	16	46	649	14.1	**85**	4
1995	ATL	16	16	74	**1,039**	14.0	52	5
1996	ATL	14	13	**75**	921	12.3	53	6
1997	ATL	16	16	65	991	15.2	56	**9**
1998	TB	11	11	41	636	15.5	62	2
1999	TB	11	10	22	238	10.8	39	1
2000	MIA	11	0	7	132	**18.9**	53	1
2001	DET	6	4	17	221	13.0	29	0
2001	NE	2	1	4	25	6.3	16	0
Career		103	87	351	4,852	13.8	85	28

== Personal life ==
His cousins, Ben Emanuel, Derrick Johnson, and Dwight Johnson also played for the NFL.

His son, Bert Emanuel Jr., is a wide receiver for the San Diego State Aztecs football team.
