= Warren Sapp =

American football player (born 1972)

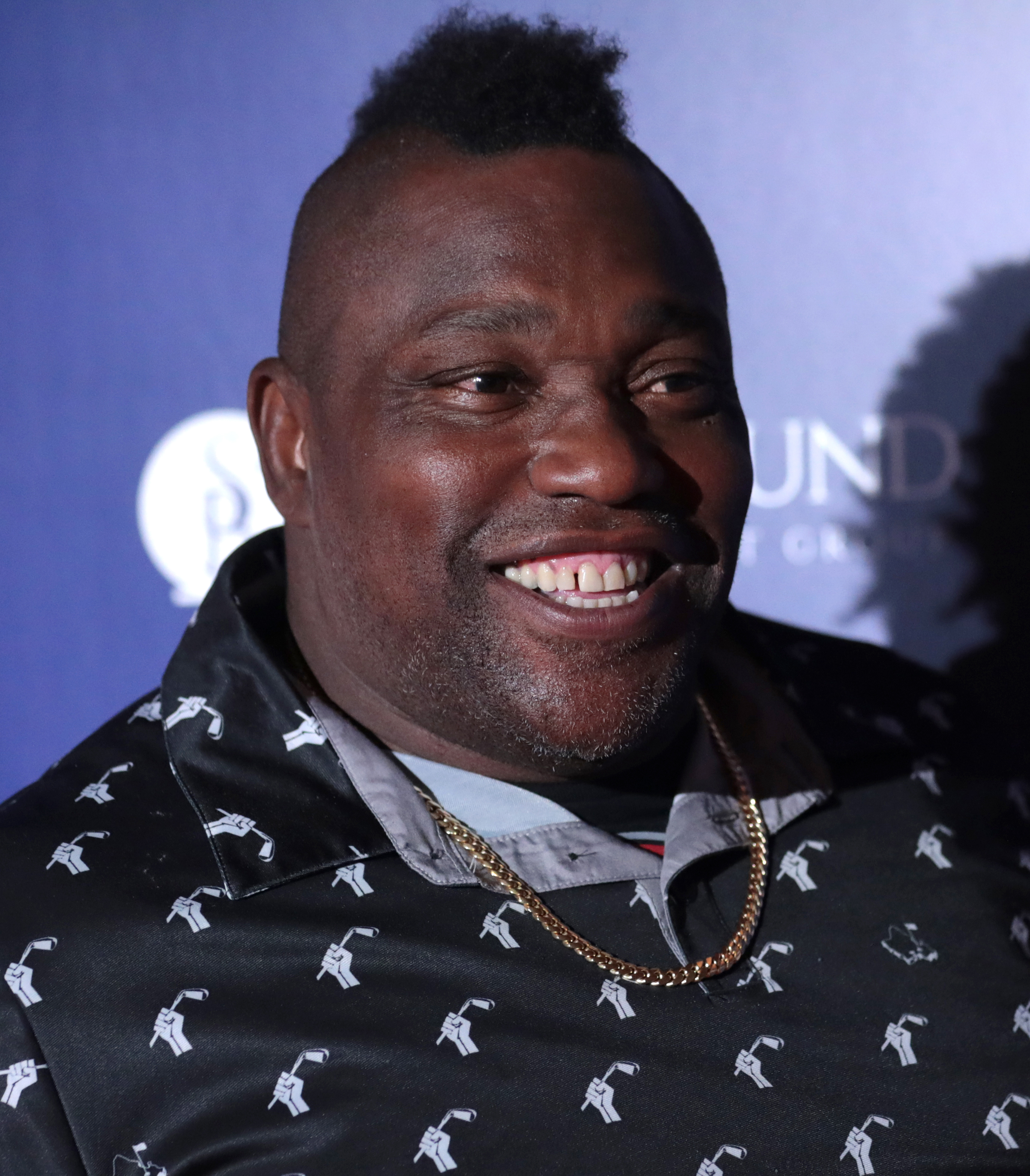
- Sapp in 2023

No. 99
- Position: Defensive tackle

Personal information
- Born: December 19, 1972 (age 53); Orlando, Florida, U.S.
- Listed height: 6 ft 2 in (1.88 m)
- Listed weight: 303 lb (137 kg)

Career information
- High school: Apopka (Apopka, Florida)
- College: Miami (1991–1994)
- NFL draft: 1995: 1st round, 12th overall pick

Career history

Playing
- Tampa Bay Buccaneers (1995–2003); Oakland Raiders (2004–2007)

Coaching
- Colorado (2024) Senior quality control analyst; Colorado (2025) Pass rush coordinator

Awards and highlights
- Super Bowl champion (XXXVII); NFL Defensive Player of the Year (1999); 4× First-team All-Pro (1999–2002); 2× Second-team All-Pro (1997, 1998); 7× Pro Bowl (1997–2003); NFL 1990s All-Decade Team; NFL 2000s All-Decade Team; PFWA All-Rookie Team (1995); Tampa Bay Buccaneers Ring of Honor; Tampa Bay Buccaneers No. 99 retired; Lombardi Award (1994); Bronko Nagurski Trophy (1994); Bill Willis Trophy (1994); Big East Defensive Player of the Year (1994); Unanimous All-American (1994); Second-team All-American (1993); 2× First-team All-Big East (1993–1994); Second-team AP All-Time All-American (2025); National champion (1991)

Career NFL statistics
- Games played: 198
- Tackles: 573
- Sacks: 96.5
- Forced fumbles: 19
- Interceptions: 4
- Total touchdowns: 3
- Stats at Pro Football Reference
- Pro Football Hall of Fame

Warren Carlos Sapp (born December 19, 1972) is an American former professional football defensive tackle who played in the National Football League (NFL) for 13 seasons, primarily with the Tampa Bay Buccaneers. He played college football for the Miami Hurricanes, winning the Lombardi Award and the Bronko Nagurski and Bill Willis trophies in 1994. Sapp was selected in the first round of 1995 NFL draft by the Buccaneers, where he spent his first nine seasons. In his final four seasons, he was a member of the Oakland Raiders. In addition, Sapp served as an assistant coach for the Colorado Buffaloes from 2024 to 2025.

With Tampa Bay, Sapp received seven Pro Bowl and four first-team All-Pro selections and was part of the team that won the franchise's first Super Bowl title in Super Bowl XXXVII. He compiled 96.5 career sacks by the time of his retirement, which are the third-highest career sacks for a defensive tackle and the 28th-highest overall for a defensive lineman. His career was also checkered by controversy from his hard-hitting style of play and occasional verbal outbursts. Along with Lee Roy Selmon and teammate Derrick Brooks, Sapp is one of three players to have their numbers retired by the Buccaneers. He was inducted to the Pro Football Hall of Fame in 2013.

== Early life ==
Sapp was born in Orlando, Florida, and raised in Plymouth, Florida, by a single mother Annie Roberts. During the late 1980s, he was honored for outstanding football play at Apopka High School in Apopka, Florida, at linebacker, tight end, kicker, and punter. He holds school records for sacks, tackles for a loss, and longest field goal. A two-sport athlete in high school, he also played on the basketball team as a power forward. In high-school football, his hard tackle of Johnny Damon in a game against Dr. Phillips High School team gave the future Major League Baseball star a concussion.

In 2007, Sapp was named to the Florida High School Association All-Century Team comprising the top 33 players in 100 years of high-school football in his home state.

== College career ==
Many top nationally ranked college football programs recruited Sapp, and he played at the University of Miami for the Hurricanes, where he was a defensive standout. He converted to defensive lineman, and in 1994, won the Bronko Nagurski Trophy (for best defensive player), the Lombardi Award (for best lineman or linebacker), and the Bill Willis Award (for best defensive lineman). As a junior at Miami in 1994, he had 84 tackles and led the Hurricanes in sacks with 10.5 sacks. He also finished sixth in Heisman Trophy voting that year.

== Professional career ==
Pre-draft measurables
Height	Weight	Arm length	Hand span
6 ft 1 in (1.85 m)	281 lb (127 kg)	32 3/4 in (0.83 m)	9 1/2 in (0.24 m)
All values from NFL Combine

Warren [Sapp] has the power of a Cortez Kennedy and the quickness of a Russell Maryland.

— former University of Miami defensive tackle Mark Caesar.

=== Tampa Bay Buccaneers ===
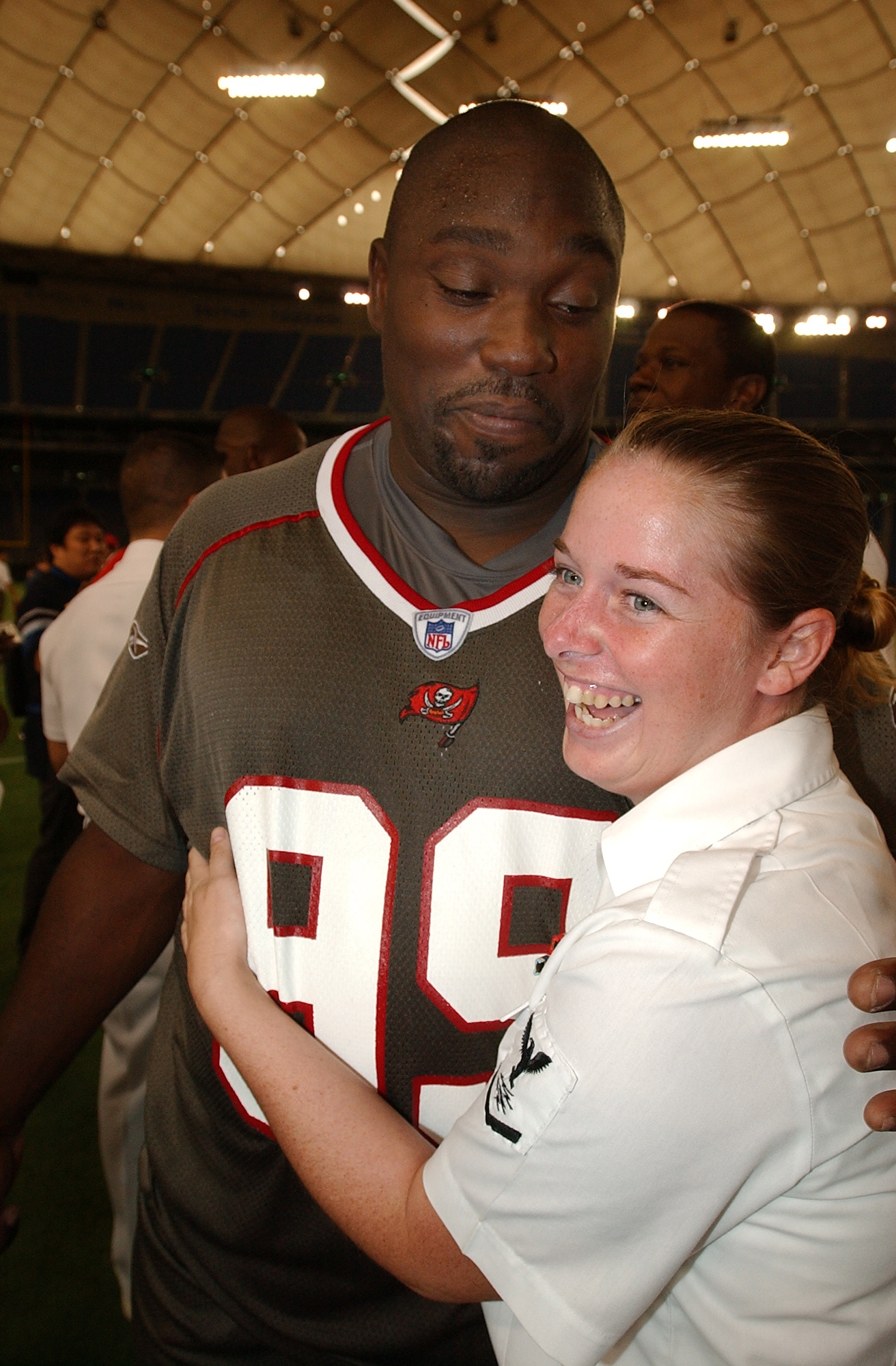
While with the Tampa Bay Buccaneers, Sapp visited U.S. Navy members at the Tokyo Dome, 2002.

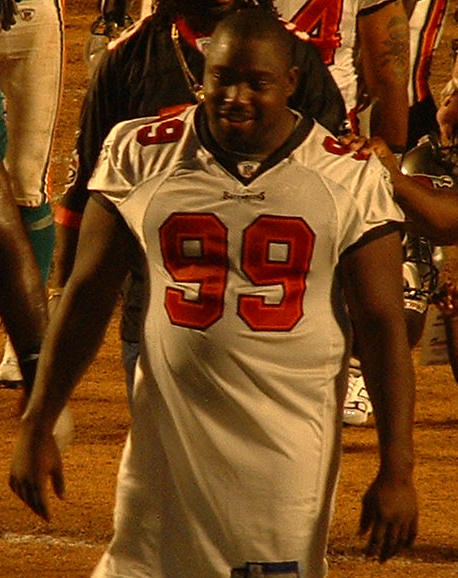
Sapp with the Buccaneers, 2003

==== 1995 NFL draft ====
Ahead of the 1995 NFL draft, Sapp ran the fastest time in the 40-yard dash for a defensive tackle (4.69 sec). Sapp was considered a potential top-five or -10 pick, but due to reports of multiple failed cocaine and marijuana tests released the night before the draft, many teams passed on him. He was ultimately selected 12th overall by the Tampa Bay Buccaneers in the first round. The NFL released a statement strongly denying the rumors and Sapp believed an anonymous individual attempted to intentionally sabotage his draft chances.

==== 1995–1999 ====
Sapp was almost immediately given the starting job as the right defensive tackle, which he held for his entire nine-year stay in Tampa. He flourished in the Tampa 2 defense, which included teammates Derrick Brooks and John Lynch. With his devastating combination of size and speed, he was able to disrupt opposing offenses even when double- or triple-teamed on the line.

He finished his rookie season with 27 tackles and one interception, and continued to be a prolific tackler for the Buccaneers. He registered 51 tackles and nine sacks in 1996, and 58 tackles and 10.5 sacks in 1997. His Pro Bowl selection in 1997 was the first of seven straight. In 1998, he signed a contract extension paying him $36 million over six years. He was honored as NFL Defensive Player of the Year in 1999.

==== 2002 ====
In 2002, the Bucs led the league in defense and won Super Bowl XXXVII over the Oakland Raiders. Sapp made five tackles and two sacks during that postseason.

===== Week 12: Mike Sherman confrontation =====
On November 24, 2002, at Raymond James Stadium, Sapp was strongly criticized for a blindside hit on the Green Bay Packers' Chad Clifton. The hit occurred during a Buccaneers interception return, when Sapp hit Clifton as the latter was jogging downfield, away from the main action. The hit inflicted a severe pelvic injury and hospitalized Clifton for almost a week, after which he could not walk unaided for the next five weeks. In 2005, the NFL Competition Committee agreed on new guidelines for "unnecessary roughness", making hits such as Sapp's on Clifton illegal.

In an exchange caught by television cameras following the game, Packers coach Mike Sherman approached Sapp and said to him, "That was a chickenshit play." In response, Sapp screamed at Sherman: "You talk tough? Put a jersey on!" Sapp later called Sherman "a lying, shit-eating hound. ... If I was 25 years old and didn't have a kid and a conscience, I would have given him an ass kicking right there at the 30-yard line." Sherman later added, "The joviality that existed after [the hit] when a guy's lying on the ground, with numbness in his legs and fingers, I just thought that wasn't appropriate for any NFL player."

===== Week 16: First skipping incident =====
During pregame warmups for the December 23, 2002 Monday Night Football game at Raymond James Stadium, Sapp skipped among the Pittsburgh Steelers as they warmed up. Steelers running back Jerome Bettis shoved him, touching off a heated argument between the two teams. Sapp was not fined for the incident, but it added to his controversial image, and he felt he had been made an example by the NFL by being fined for a second Monday-night skipping incident (described below). "That's all this is about," said Sapp. "In my nine years in this league, no one's been fined for verbally abusing officials. It's unprecedented." The Buccaneers had been earlier ridiculed by Steelers' Lee Flowers as being "paper champions".

==== 2003 ====
On October 6, 2003, during a Monday Night Football game against the Indianapolis Colts, Sapp was scolded for skipping through and disrupting the Colts, who were spread out on the field stretching during warmups. Much anticipation and national interest going into the game had been generated by the return of former head coach Tony Dungy to Tampa. The Colts wound up erasing a 21-point deficit in the final four minutes and defeating the Buccaneers 38–35 in overtime, sending the defending champions into a downslide.

The next Sunday, October 12, 2003, before the Buccaneers took on the Washington Redskins, Sapp, while running onto the field, bumped into an NFL referee and drew a $50,000 fine. His response: "It's a slave system. Make no mistake about it. Slavemaster say you can't do it, don't do it. They'll make an example out of you."

=== Oakland Raiders ===
Sapp with the Oakland Raiders, 2007

In 2004, Sapp was reportedly interested in accepting a contract offer from the Cincinnati Bengals for four years worth $16 million, but on March 20, he announced he had agreed to terms on a seven-year, $36.6 million contract with the Oakland Raiders, the same team he had helped rout in the Super Bowl in early 2003.

He started all 16 games in his first season in Oakland, splitting time at defensive end and defensive tackle, recording 30 tackles (18 solo) and 2.5 sacks and recovering two fumbles after having lost an estimated 20 pounds before joining the Raiders for the 2004 season.

His 2005 season got off to a great beginning back in his familiar defensive tackle position. He started the first 10 games of the season with 29 tackles (26 of them solo), and finished second on the team to Derrick Burgess with five sacks before being sidelined for the last six games of 2005 with a shoulder injury.

He returned to his All-Pro form in 2006. He had 10 sacks to go along with 32 tackles (16 solo) and one forced fumble.

==== 2007 ====
He lost 49 lb before the 2007 season, and recorded 37 tackles (24 solo), two sacks, and two forced fumbles.

On December 23, 2007, Sapp got ejected after an altercation with the officials near the end of the second quarter of the Raiders' game at Jacksonville. The incident began when linesman Jerry Bergman mistakenly assumed that the Raiders would decline a 10-yard Jaguar penalty. Sapp, the defensive captain, shot back at referee Jerome Boger that the Raiders wanted to accept the penalty. The conversation became heated, with Sapp gesturing and swearing, provoking Boger to flag him for unsportsmanlike conduct, but Sapp and the rest of the Raider defense continued to mouth off at the officials, resulting in a second unsportsmanlike against Sapp and a third unsportsmanlike against teammate Derrick Burgess. Finally, the coaches ran onto the field, and along with the officials, began physically separating the disgruntled players. Boger claimed that Sapp had "bumped" him in the process, while Sapp denied any physical contact. In any event, Boger then levied a third unsportsmanlike conduct penalty against Sapp (fourth against the team) and ejected him. The league eventually fined him $75,000, and Burgess $25,000 (i.e., $25,000 for each unsportsmanlike penalty).

On January 3, 2008, Sapp told Raider owner Al Davis over the phone that he would retire and confirmed this on his website, qbkilla.com, in just two words: "I'M DONE!" The retirement became official on March 4, 2008.

=== Legacy ===
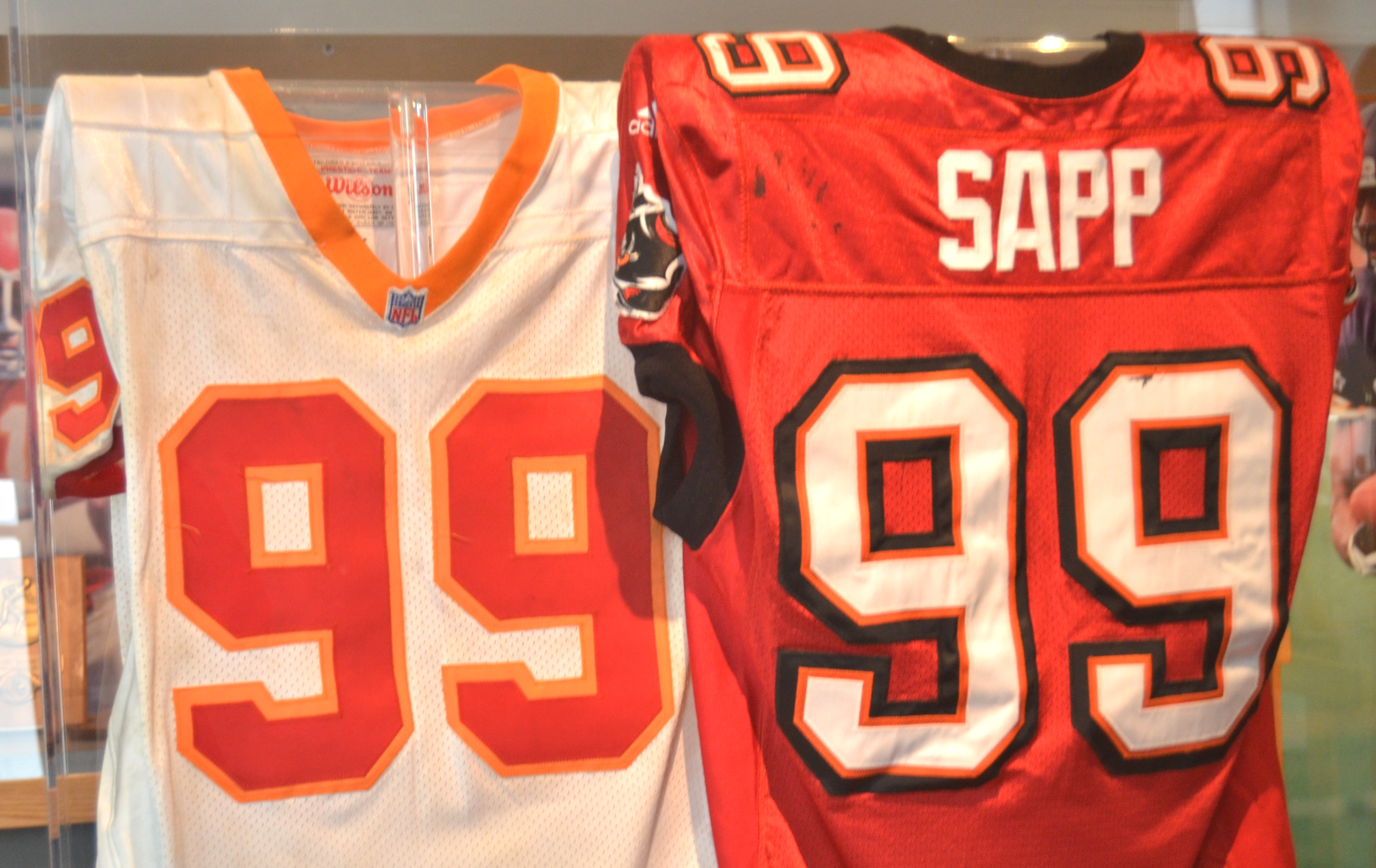
Sapp's jerseys on display at the Pro Football Hall of Fame in Canton, Ohio

At the time of his retirement, Sapp was one of only 12 defensive players in NFL history to make the Pro Bowl, be named Defensive Player of the Year, and win a Super Bowl or pre-Super Bowl NFL title. The others are Mean Joe Greene, Jack Lambert, Mel Blount, Lester Hayes, Mike Singletary, Lawrence Taylor, Bob Sanders, Deion Sanders, Reggie White, Ray Lewis, Rod Woodson, and Sapp's former teammate, Derrick Brooks. Michael Strahan, James Harrison, Ed Reed, Troy Polamalu, Charles Woodson, Terrell Suggs, Stephon Gilmore, and Aaron Donald have since joined the list. He is now considered to be the prototype three-technique defensive tackle, and ever since his retirement, NFL teams scouting defensive tackles have reportedly been looking for a "Baby Sapp". He was selected to seven Pro Bowls, was named a first-team All-Pro four times, a second-team All-Pro twice, voted to the 1990s and 2000s All-Decade Teams, and earned Defensive Player of the Year honors after a 12.5-sack season in 1999.

== NFL career statistics ==
Legend
	NFL Defensive Player of the Year
	Won the Super Bowl
**Bold**	Career high

Year	Team	Games		Tackles				Fumbles			Interceptions					
Year	Team	GP	GS	Cmb	Solo	Ast	Sck	FF	FR	Yds	Int	Yds	Avg	Lng	TD	PD
1995	TB	16	8	26	16	10	3.0	1	0	0	1	**5**	**5.0**	**5**	**1**	**5**
1996	TB	15	14	51	41	10	9.0	1	1	0	0	0	0.0	0	0	0
1997	TB	15	15	**58**	**47**	11	10.5	2	1	**23**	0	0	0.0	0	0	2
1998	TB	16	16	44	28	**16**	7.0	2	1	0	0	0	0.0	0	0	2
1999	TB	15	15	41	27	14	12.5	**4**	**2**	0	0	0	0.0	0	0	4
2000	TB	16	15	52	43	9	**16.5**	1	1	0	0	0	0.0	0	0	3
2001	TB	16	16	36	28	8	6.0	1	**2**	0	0	0	0.0	0	0	0
2002	TB	16	16	47	40	7	7.5	1	1	0	**2**	0	0.0	0	0	4
2003	TB	15	15	43	36	7	5.0	2	0	0	0	0	0.0	0	0	3
2004	OAK	16	16	42	30	12	2.5	0	**2**	0	0	0	0.0	0	0	0
2005	OAK	10	10	32	29	3	5.0	1	0	0	1	3	3.0	3	0	3
2006	OAK	16	16	47	32	15	10.0	1	0	0	0	0	0.0	0	0	2
2007	OAK	16	16	50	37	13	2.0	2	1	0	0	0	0.0	0	0	1
Career		198	188	569	434	135	96.5	19	12	23	4	8	2.0	5	1	29

== Coaching career ==
In the mid-2020s, Sapp transitioned into coaching, joining the staff of Colorado Buffaloes football under head coach Deion Sanders.

Sapp initially joined the program in 2024 as a senior quality-control analyst and graduate assistant while taking graduate courses at the University of Colorado Boulder. Despite having no previous formal coaching experience, he was tasked with assisting the defensive line and mentoring pass rushers.

During the 2025 season Sapp was promoted to defensive pass-rush coordinator. Colorado's defensive front experienced mixed results during his tenure; the team improved its sack production in 2024 but regressed significantly in 2025, finishing near the bottom nationally in sacks during a 3–9 season.

In February 2026, Colorado announced that Sapp had resigned from the coaching staff after two seasons. The university stated that he stepped down in order to pursue other professional opportunities and thanked him for his contributions to the football program and its student-athletes.

His departure occurred amid a broader restructuring of the defensive coaching staff following the exit of defensive coordinator Robert Livingston to the Denver Broncos and other changes within the program.

== Personal life ==
In January 1998, Sapp married Jamiko Vaughn. They divorced in 2007. The couple had two children, daughter Mercedes in 1998 and son Warren Sapp II in 2000.

In 2023, Sapp graduated from Texas Seminary Christian University with a bachelor of arts in Christian sports management. The degree allowed him to work as a Colorado Buffaloes football staff member.

=== Activities ===
Sapp, Devin Bush, and a developer created an Urban Solutions Group in 2006 to construct low-income housing in Fort Pierce, Florida. The PNC Bank lent the group money, but by 2008, the real-estate market tanked and the project ended in failure.

On August 19, 2008, Sapp was hired as a studio analyst for Inside the NFL on Showtime, a position he held until 2011.

In the fall of 2008, Sapp appeared as a contestant on the seventh season of Dancing with the Stars. Sapp's partner for the competition was professional dancer Kym Johnson; the pair made it to the finals, where they were eventually named runner-up of season seven.

He made his stand-up comedy debut at the Comedy Central Roast of Larry the Cable Guy on March 16, 2009.

He worked for NFL Network as an analyst featured on NFL Total Access and NFL GameDay Morning until he was fired in 2015 following his arrest for solicitation. In the summer of 2012, he released a book titled Sapp Attack through St. Martins Publishing.

In June 2012, Sapp teamed up with the Network of Champions (NOC), a YouTube premium content channel, to produce a TV show series called Judge Sapp. He also participated in Fox's dating game show The Choice.

In January 2013, Sapp worked with Dr. Jonathan Greenburg to raise awareness about the importance of getting tested and treated for snoring and obstructive sleep apnea.

He was also a celebrity judge on the second season of the reality show BBQ Pitmasters.

On July 27, 2016, Sapp was bitten by a shark while lobstering off the coast of Florida.

In October 2020, the internet sportsbook BetUS announced Warren Sapp and Brian Jones as the hosts of the weekly podcast "BetUS Unfiltered". Sapp and Jones have interviewed celebrities such as Derrick Johnson, Adam Schefter, Ray Lewis, Kevin Carter, Rick Neuheisel, and Jen Welter on the podcast.

=== Legal troubles ===
On February 7, 2010, Sapp was arrested in South Florida and charged with domestic battery while in Florida as an analyst for the NFL Network's coverage of Super Bowl XLIV. Following the arrest, the NFL Network cancelled his appearance. On March 24, however, the charges against Sapp were dropped.

On February 2, 2015, the day after Super Bowl XLIX, Sapp was arrested on suspicion of soliciting a prostitute and assault. Later that day, Sapp's contract was terminated by the NFL Network. In May 2015, the charges were dismissed.

=== Bankruptcy ===
In 2010, PNC Bank was awarded a judgment of $988,691.99, and in December 2011, filed a monthly lien of $33,333 against Sapp's $45,000 NFL Network paycheck. He also owed the Internal Revenue Service $853,003 from income in 2006 and $89,775 for 2010. He was $876,000 behind on alimony and child support for his former spouse, owed $68,738 for unpaid property taxes in Windermere, and owed money to attorneys, friends, and a speech therapist, as well.

On April 7, 2012, the Associated Press reported that Sapp had filed for bankruptcy in an effort to discharge debt from failed businesses. In these Chapter 7 filings, he claimed to have lost his University of Miami championship rings and his Buccaneers Super Bowl ring. The balances in his checking and savings accounts were said to be less than $1,000. He claimed no credit card debt and owned no automobiles, but owed National Car Rental $90,685 through his business, Nine-Nine, LLC. Court filings indicated Sapp's assets totaled $6.45 million against a debt of $6.7 million. His monthly income was reported as $115,861. On November 1, 2012, Sapp's 10,000-square-foot (930 m^{2}) house in Windermere was auctioned off for $2.9 million.

Awards and achievements
Preceded by Jason Taylor & Edyta Śliwińska	Dancing with the Stars (US) runner up Season 7 (Fall 2008 with Kym Johnson)	Succeeded by Gilles Marini & Cheryl Burke
