= Nigea Carter =

American football player (born 1973)

No. 81
- Position: Wide receiver

Personal information
- Born: September 1, 1973 (age 53); Fort Lauderdale, Florida, U.S.

Career information
- High school: Coconut Creek (FL)
- College: Michigan State
- NFL draft: 1997: 6th round, 197th overall pick

Career history
- Tampa Bay Buccaneers (1997)*
- * Offseason or practice squad member only

Nigea Carter (born September 1, 1973) is an American former wide receiver for the Michigan State Spartans football team. In his total of four years from 1993 to 1996 of playing with Michigan State, he had a total of 81 receptions, 1,413 receiving yards, and 10 touchdowns.

== College career ==
Carter chose to play for Michigan State after initially committing to Tennessee.

On October 29, 1994, in a game against Indiana, Carter caught a 93-yard touchdown pass, helping the Spartans to a 27–21 victory.

In 1995, in a game against Michigan, Tony Banks led an 88-yard drive and threw the winning touchdown to Carter with 1:24 left in the game to win 28–25 over the No. 7 ranked Wolverines.

== Professional career ==
Carter was the 197th overall pick in round six of the 1997 NFL draft by the Tampa Bay Buccaneers. Carter did not make the final roster.
