= Shevin Smith =

American football player (1975–2019)

No. 29, 30
- Position: Safety

Personal information
- Born: June 17, 1975; Miami, Florida, U.S.
- Died: August 30, 2019 (aged 44)
- Listed height: 5 ft 11 in (1.80 m)
- Listed weight: 204 lb (93 kg)

Career information
- High school: Miami Southridge (Miami)
- College: Florida State
- NFL draft: 1998: 6th round, 184th overall pick

Career history
- Tampa Bay Buccaneers (1998–1999); St. Louis Rams (2000); Tampa Bay Storm (2004)

Awards and highlights
- Second-team All-ACC (1997)

Career NFL statistics
- Games played: 19
- Games started: 0
- Tackles: 5
- Stats at Pro Football Reference

Shevin Jamar Smith (June 17, 1975 – August 30, 2019) was an American professional football safety in the National Football League (NFL). He played two seasons for the Tampa Bay Buccaneers. He was drafted in the sixth round of the 1998 NFL Draft with the 184th overall pick.
