= Kevin McLeod (American football) =

American football player (born 1974)

No. 43, 48
- Position: Fullback

Personal information
- Born: October 17, 1974 (age 52); Montego Bay, Jamaica
- Listed height: 6 ft 0 in (1.83 m)
- Listed weight: 250 lb (113 kg)

Career information
- High school: Clarkston (Clarkston, Georgia, U.S.)
- College: Auburn
- NFL draft: 1998: 6th round, 182nd overall pick

Career history
- Jacksonville Jaguars (1998)*; Tampa Bay Buccaneers (1998-2000); Atlanta Falcons (2001)*; Frankfurt Galaxy (2001); Green Bay Packers (2002)*; Cleveland Browns (2002)*; Orlando Predators (2003); Cleveland Browns (2003)
- * Offseason or practice squad member only
- Stats at Pro Football Reference

Kevin Aston McLeod (born October 17, 1974) is a former American football fullback in the National Football League (NFL) who played for the Tampa Bay Buccaneers and Cleveland Browns. He was selected by the Jacksonville Jaguars in the sixth round (182nd overall) of the 1998 NFL draft. He played college football for the Auburn Tigers. He also played in the Arena Football League (AFL) for the Orlando Predators.
