= James Cannida =

American football player (born 1975)

No. 98, 97
- Position: Defensive tackle

Personal information
- Born: January 3, 1975 (age 51); Savannah, Georgia, U.S.
- Listed height: 6 ft 2 in (1.88 m)
- Listed weight: 315 lb (143 kg)

Career information
- High school: American (Fremont, California)
- College: Nevada
- NFL draft: 1998: 6th round, 175th overall pick

Career history
- Tampa Bay Buccaneers (1998–2001); Indianapolis Colts (2002); Washington Redskins (2003)*; Dallas Desperados (2005–2007)
- * Offseason or practice squad member only

Career NFL statistics
- Tackles: 72
- Sacks: 3
- Fumble recoveries: 1
- Stats at Pro Football Reference

Career AFL statistics
- Tackles: 13
- Sacks: 2
- Fumble recoveries: 2
- Stats at ArenaFan.com

James Thomas Cannida II (born January 3, 1975) is an American former professional football player who was a defensive lineman in the National Football League (NFL) for the Tampa Bay Buccaneers (1998–2001) and the Indianapolis Colts (2002). Cannida is currently the eighth grade head football coach at Scoggins Middle School in Frisco Independent School District. He played college football for the Nevada Wolf Pack and was selected in the sixth round of the 1998 NFL draft.

== Early life ==
Cannida attended American High School in Fremont, California, and was a student and a letterman in football and basketball. In football, he was an All-League selection and an All-East Bay selection.
