= Mitch Palmer =

American football player (born 1973)

No. 54, 51
- Position: Linebacker

Personal information
- Born: September 2, 1973 (age 53); Oceanside, California, U.S.
- Listed height: 6 ft 4 in (1.93 m)
- Listed weight: 259 lb (117 kg)

Career information
- High school: Poway (Poway, California)
- College: Colorado State
- NFL draft: 1996: undrafted

Career history
- Carolina Panthers (1997)*; Tampa Bay Buccaneers (1998–1999); Minnesota Vikings (2000); Houston Texans (2002)*; Dallas Cowboys (2002)*
- * Offseason or practice squad member only
- Stats at Pro Football Reference

Mitch Palmer (born September 2, 1973) is an American former professional football player who was a linebacker in the National Football League (NFL). He played college football for the Colorado State Rams. He played in the NFL for the Tampa Bay Buccaneers from 1998 to 1999 and for the Minnesota Vikings in 2000.
