= Warrick Dunn =

American football player (born 1975)

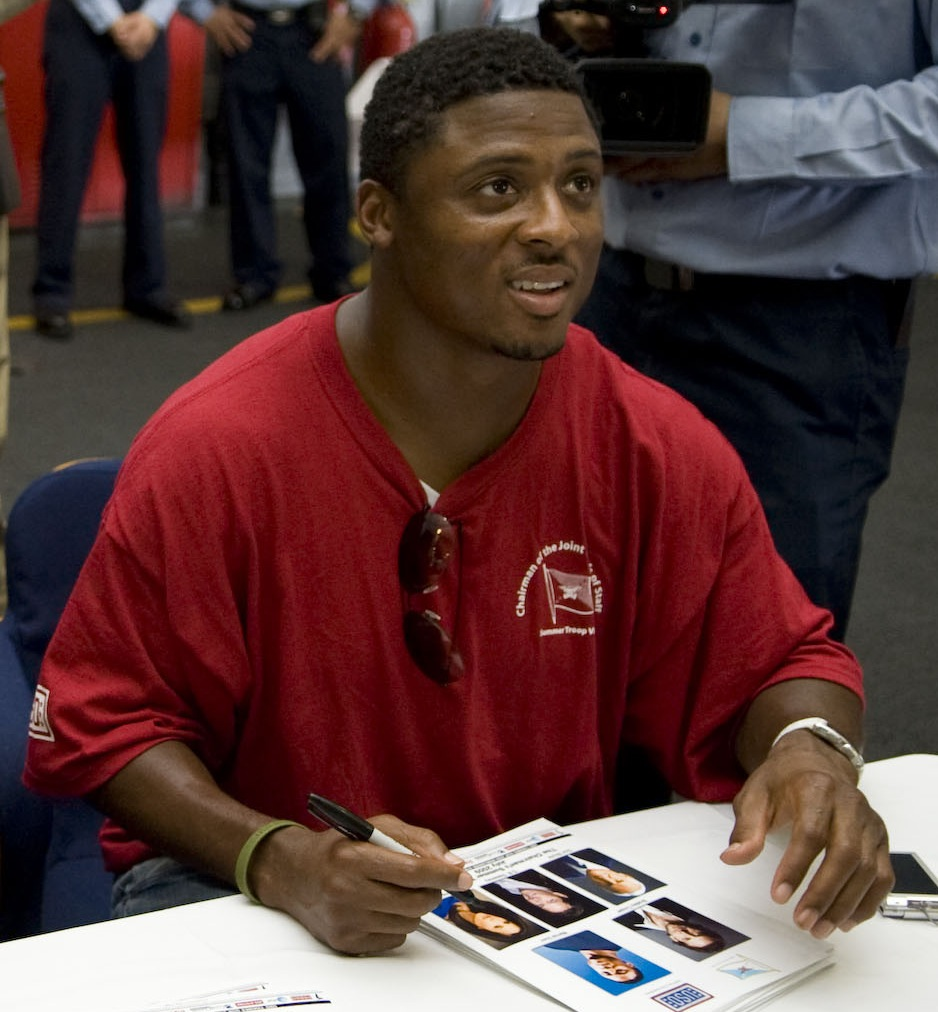
- Dunn signing autographs in 2009

No. 28
- Position: Running back

Personal information
- Born: January 5, 1975 (age 51); Baton Rouge, Louisiana, U.S.
- Listed height: 5 ft 9 in (1.75 m)
- Listed weight: 180 lb (82 kg)

Career information
- High school: Catholic (Baton Rouge)
- College: Florida State (1993–1996)
- NFL draft: 1997: 1st round, 12th overall pick

Career history
- Tampa Bay Buccaneers (1997–2001); Atlanta Falcons (2002–2007); Tampa Bay Buccaneers (2008)

Awards and highlights
- NFL Offensive Rookie of the Year (1997); Walter Payton NFL Man of the Year (2004); 3× Pro Bowl (1997, 2000, 2005); PFWA All-Rookie Team (1997); Atlanta Falcons Ring of Honor; National champion (1993); First-team All-American (1996); 3 × First-team All-ACC (1994–1996); Florida State Seminoles Jersey No. 28 honored

Career NFL statistics
- Rushing yards: 10,967
- Rushing average: 4.1
- Rushing touchdowns: 49
- Receptions: 510
- Receiving yards: 4,339
- Receiving touchdowns: 15
- Stats at Pro Football Reference
- College Football Hall of Fame

Warrick De'Mon Dunn (born January 5, 1975) is an American former professional football player who was a running back for 12 seasons in the National Football League (NFL). He was selected by the Tampa Bay Buccaneers 12th overall in the 1997 NFL draft, after playing college football for the Florida State Seminoles. Dunn was named AP NFL Offensive Rookie of the Year in 1997 and earned three Pro Bowl selections in his career. After his playing career, Dunn took a minority stake in the Falcons' ownership group led by Arthur Blank.

== Early life ==
At Catholic High in Baton Rouge, Louisiana, Dunn played quarterback, cornerback, and running back. During his sophomore year, he helped lead Catholic High to the state 4A championship game for the first time in its history. He was an All-America honorable mention selection by USA Today as a senior.

On January 7, 1993, two days after Dunn's eighteenth birthday, his mother, Betty Smothers, a Baton Rouge police officer, was murdered while working an off-duty security job. Dunn became the head of his family and raised his siblings. He later met with one of his mother's killers, Kevan Brumfield, and offered his forgiveness.

== College career ==
Dunn played college football at Florida State University, where he rushed for over 1,000 yards in 3 straight seasons. He graduated in 1997 with a bachelor's degree in information studies. He was a three-time All-ACC selection.

Dunn's jersey, along with those of other Seminoles players such as Fred Biletnikoff, Ron Sellers, Ron Simmons, Charlie Ward, Deion Sanders, and Chris Weinke, has been retired by the university. His number (28) may still be worn by Seminole players, but his jersey will be displayed in the Moore Athletic Center at FSU. He also won a national championship in 1993 with Florida State.

=== Track and field ===
Warrick Dunn was also an accomplished track and field star, named as an Associated Press All-American as a member of Florida State's men's 4 × 100 m relay team. Dunn competed on the Seminoles' track & field team as a sprinter during all four years he was enrolled at Florida State. His personal best in the 100 meters is 10.3 seconds.

== Professional career ==
Pre-draft measurables
Height	Weight	Arm length	Hand span
5 ft 8 in (1.73 m)	176 lb (80 kg)	30 3/4 in (0.78 m)	8 1/2 in (0.22 m)
All values from NFL Combine

=== Tampa Bay Buccaneers (first stint) ===
Dunn was selected in the first round of the 1997 NFL draft with the 12th overall pick by the Tampa Bay Buccaneers. Dunn had a highly successful rookie season, was selected to the NFC Pro Bowl team, and named the Associated Press Offensive Rookie of the Year. Dunn spent the next four years of his career in Tampa Bay, and was again named to the Pro Bowl in 2000. In game 13 of that season, he had a career-best 210 yards rushing against the Dallas Cowboys (then, 2nd most in franchise history).

=== Atlanta Falcons ===
A free agent in the 2002 offseason, Dunn signed with the Atlanta Falcons. Once again, he made a positive impact on his team with 9 total TDs and in that year, he led the league with a 5.4 yards per carry average. Dunn scored the most rushing touchdowns in his career, 9, in the 2004 season despite splitting carries with T.J. Duckett and also led the team in rushing with 1,106 yards. Having led his team in rushing yards again in 2005, Dunn was named the NFC's Pro Bowl team, marking his third selection to the team. For his career, Dunn has only missed 10 games and has a total of 2,256 carries for 9,461 yards 43 touchdowns and a 4.2 average. Dunn finished his first 10 seasons with at least 1,000 combined rushing and receiving yards per season. During the 2007 season, with Falcons starting quarterback Byron Leftwich out with a high ankle sprain, Dunn served as the third string emergency quarterback behind Joey Harrington and Chris Redman, a position he played in high school.

On March 3, 2008, the Falcons released Dunn per his request. This came a day after the Falcons signed former San Diego Chargers backup running back Michael Turner. On December 17, 2009, he became a minority owner of the Atlanta Falcons.

=== Tampa Bay Buccaneers (second stint) ===
On March 10, 2008, Dunn returned to the Buccaneers after signing a two-year, $6 million contract. In week 6 against the Carolina Panthers, Dunn had his first 100-yard game since re-joining the Buccaneers. Dunn was released by the Buccaneers on February 25, 2009. He retired from the NFL 14th all-time in all-purpose yards with 15,306 (20th As of 2020) and 19th in rushing yards with 10,967 (23rd As of 2020).

== Career statistics ==
Legend
**Bold**	Career high

=== NFL ===
Year	Team	GP	Rushing						Receiving						Fumbles	
Year	Team	GP	Att	Yds	Avg	Lng	TD	FD	Rec	Yds	Avg	Lng	TD	FD	Fum	Lost
1997	TB	16	224	978	4.4	76	4	34	39	462	**11.8**	59	**3**	18	3	2
1998	TB	16	245	1,026	4.2	50	2	42	44	344	7.8	31	0	22	1	0
1999	TB	15	195	616	3.2	33	0	29	64	**589**	9.2	68	2	**29**	3	2
2000	TB	16	248	1,133	4.6	70	8	42	44	422	9.6	45	1	23	1	1
2001	TB	13	158	447	2.8	21	3	20	**68**	557	8.2	31	**3**	**29**	2	2
2002	ATL	15	230	927	4.0	59	7	39	50	377	7.5	31	2	15	**4**	**3**
2003	ATL	11	125	672	**5.4**	69	3	27	37	336	9.1	**86**	2	14	2	1
2004	ATL	16	265	1,106	4.2	60	**9**	46	29	294	10.1	59	0	9	3	2
2005	ATL	16	280	**1,416**	5.1	65	3	**65**	29	220	7.6	24	1	8	3	1
2006	ATL	16	**286**	1,140	4.0	**90**	4	48	22	170	7.7	18	1	11	1	0
2007	ATL	16	227	720	3.2	38	4	34	37	238	6.4	35	0	5	2	2
2008	TB	15	186	786	4.2	40	2	31	47	330	7.0	36	0	11	0	0
Career		181	2,669	10,967	4.1	90	49	457	510	4,339	8.5	86	15	194	25	16

=== College ===
Season	Team	GP	Rushing				Receiving		
Season	Team	GP	Att	Yds	Avg	TD	Rec	Yds	TD
1993	Florida State	12	68	511	**7.5**	4	25	**357**	**6**
1994	Florida State	11	152	1,026	6.8	8	34	308	1
1995	Florida State	11	166	**1,242**	**7.5**	**13**	**43**	294	3
1996	Florida State	11	**189**	1,180	6.2	12	30	355	2
Total		45	575	3,959	6.9	37	132	1,314	12

== Career highlights ==
=== Awards and honors ===
NFL

- NFL Offensive Rookie of the Year (1997)
- Walter Payton NFL Man of the Year (2004)
- 3× Pro Bowl (1997, 2000, 2005)
- Bart Starr Award (2009)
- PFWA All-Rookie Team (1997)
- Atlanta Falcons Ring of Honor

College

- National champion (1993)
- First-team All-American (1996)
- 3 × First-team All-ACC (1994–1996)
- Florida State Seminoles Jersey No. 28 honored

=== Records ===
==== Falcons franchise records ====
As of 2017's NFL off-season, Warrick Dunn has held at least 11 Falcons franchise records, including:

- Rush Yards: playoffs (310), playoff game (142 on 2005-01-15 STL)
- Rush Yds/Att: playoffs (5.08), playoff season (6.28 in 2004), playoff game (8.35 on 2005-01-15 STL)
- Rushing TDs: playoffs (3), playoff season (3 in 2004), playoff game (2 on 2005-01-15 STL)
- Rush Yds/Game: playoffs (77.5), playoff season (100.5 in 2004)
- 100+ yard rushing games: playoffs (1, tied with Jamal Anderson and Michael Vick)

==== Buccaneers franchise records ====
He also has held at least 5 Buccaneers franchise records, including:

- Receptions: game (12 on 2001-11-18 CHI), playoffs (26), playoff game (8 on 2002-01-12 @PHI)
- All Purpose Yds: playoff season (271 in 1999)
- 1000+ rushing yard seasons: career (2, tied with 3 others)

== Personal life ==
Dunn established the Homes for the Holidays (HFTH) program in 1997, and started Warrick Dunn Charities (WDC) in 2002 as a way to grow programs and services. The HFTH program rewards single-parent families for reaching first-time homeownership. HFTH recipient families are chosen through a partnership with Habitat for Humanity affiliates and WDC with complete home furnishings and down-payment assistance. As of July 2012, HFTH has assisted over 150 single parents and over 300 dependents in Atlanta, Baton Rouge, Tampa and Tallahassee. By providing families with a positive home environment, WDC believes that children can thrive educationally, socially and economically. In 2006, one of those homes happened to go to the family of future NFL player Deshaun Watson. Watson went on to play quarterback for Clemson and win the 2017 College Football Playoff National Championship.

Dunn's achievements have been recognized over the years. He received a Giant Steps Award in civic leadership from former President Bill Clinton for his program. In 2005, Dunn was presented with the Walter Payton Man of the Year Award. This award is the only NFL award that recognizes a player for his community service as well as for his excellence on the field. In the aftermath of Hurricane Katrina, Dunn challenged all NFL players, except for those who play for the New Orleans Saints, to donate at least $5,000 to the effort. The effort received over $5 million in contributions.

In 2007, Dunn, along with Andre Agassi, Muhammad Ali, Lance Armstrong, Jeff Gordon, Mia Hamm, Tony Hawk, Andrea Jaeger, Jackie Joyner-Kersee, Mario Lemieux, Alonzo Mourning and Cal Ripken Jr., founded Athletes for Hope, a charitable organization that helps professional athletes, sports industry professionals and fans get involved in charitable causes. For his exceptional involvement on and off the field, Dunn was awarded with the 2009 Bart Starr Award. He also received a Jefferson Award for Outstanding Athlete in Service and Philanthropy in 2011.

=== Writing ===
Dunn's 2008 autobiography, Running For My Life ISBN 978-0-06-143264-4, details his mother's murder and his battles with depression throughout his life.
