= Floyd Young =

American football player (born 1975)

No. 31
- Position: Cornerback

Personal information
- Born: November 23, 1975 (age 50); New Orleans, Louisiana, U.S.
- Listed height: 6 ft 0 in (1.83 m)
- Listed weight: 179 lb (81 kg)

Career information
- High school: Joseph S. Clark (New Orleans)
- College: Texas A&M–Kingsville
- NFL draft: 1997: undrafted

Career history
- Tampa Bay Buccaneers (1997–2000); Chicago Bears (2001–2002)*; Tampa Bay Storm (2006); Orlando Predators (2007)
- * Offseason or practice squad member only
- Stats at Pro Football Reference
- Stats at ArenaFan.com

Floyd Alexander Young (born November 23, 1975) is an American former professional football cornerback who played for the Tampa Bay Buccaneers of the National Football League (NFL). He played college football for the Texas A&M–Kingsville Javelinas.

== Early life ==
Floyd Alexander Young was born on November 23, 1975, in New Orleans, Louisiana. He played high school football at Joseph S. Clark Sr. High School in New Orleans as a quarterback. Young later said "I was a 1,000-yard passer. Of course, that ain't nothing. That's like a 100-yard passer in the NFL."

Young played junior college football at Scottsdale Community College from 1993 to 1994 as a cornerback. He then transferred to Texas A&M University–Kingsville, where he was a two-year letterman for the Javelinas from 1995 to 1996. He recorded career totals of six interceptions, 14 pass breakups, and three fumble recoveries at Texas A&M University–Kingsville. Young said he could have had more interceptions but dropped several of them.

== Professional career ==
After going undrafted in the 1997 NFL draft, Young signed with the Tampa Bay Buccaneers on May 5, 1997. He was released on July 18, re-signed on July 22, released again on August 17, and signed to the practice squad on August 26. He was promoted to the active roster on September 27, 1997. Young was one of five Texas A&M–Kingsville players who were with the Buccaneers during the 1997 season. On November 9, against the Atlanta Falcons, Young received partial credit for a blocked punt. On December 28, 1997, in the 20–10 wildcard round victory over the Detroit Lions, he nearly blocked a punt which caused an unsuccessful rushing attempt by punter John Jett. Young became a free agent after the 1999 season and re-signed with the Buccaneers on May 30, 2000. Overall, Young played in 36 regular season games, starting one, for the Buccaneers from 1997 to 2000, totaling 26 solo tackles, three assisted tackles, one forced fumble, and one fumble recovery. He also appeared in four playoff games, recording five solo tackles and one assisted tackle.

Young became a free agent again after the 2000 season, and signed with the Chicago Bears on June 22, 2001. He was released on September 1 before the start of the 2001 regular season. He signed with the Bears again on February 28, 2002. After suffering a hamstring injury, he was released with an injury settlement on August 1, 2002.

On March 9, 2006, Young was signed to the practice squad of the Tampa Bay Storm of the Arena Football League (AFL). He was later promoted to the active roster and played in three games for the Storm during the 2006 season, posting three solo tackles, four assisted tackles, and three pass breakups. He was placed on injured reserve on May 11, 2006, and later waived on November 29, 2006.

Young signed with the AFL's Orlando Predators on January 24, 2007. He was placed on injured reserve on February 26, activated on May 24, and placed on injured reserve again on June 12, 2007. He played in three games overall for the Predators during the 2007 season, recording 12 solo tackles and two assisted tackles.
