= Tony Mayberry =

American football player (born 1967)

No. 61
- Position: Center

Personal information
- Born: December 8, 1967 (age 58); Würzburg, Germany
- Listed height: 6 ft 4 in (1.93 m)
- Listed weight: 288 lb (131 kg)

Career information
- High school: Hayfield (Alexandria, Virginia)
- College: Wake Forest (1986–1989)
- NFL draft: 1990: 4th round, 108th overall pick

Career history
- Tampa Bay Buccaneers (1990–1999)

Awards and highlights
- 3× Pro Bowl (1997–1999); Second-team All-ACC (1989)

Career NFL statistics
- Games played: 160
- Games started: 145
- Fumble recoveries: 3
- Stats at Pro Football Reference

Eino Anthony Mayberry (born December 8, 1967) is a former American football player who played center for the Tampa Bay Buccaneers from 1990 to 1999. He was drafted in the fourth round of the 1990 NFL Draft by the Buccaneers. He was selected to three Pro Bowls.
