= 1993 All-America college football team =

Official list of the best college football players of 1993

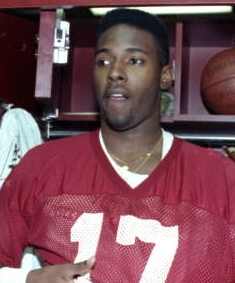
1993 Heisman Trophy winner Charlie Ward

The 1993 All-America college football team is composed of college football players who were selected as All-Americans by various organizations and publications that chose College Football All-America Teams in 1993. It is an honor given annually to the best American college football players at their respective positions.

The National Collegiate Athletic Association (NCAA) recognizes seven selectors as "official" for the 1993 season. They are: (1) the American Football Coaches Association (AFCA); (2) the Associated Press (AP) selected based on the votes of sports writers at AP newspapers; (3) Football News; (4) the Football Writers Association of America (FWAA); (4) The Sporting News; (6) the United Press International (UPI); and (7) the Walter Camp Football Foundation (WCFF). Other notable selectors included Gannett News Service (GNS), Scripps Howard (SH), and the Newspaper Enterprise Association (NEA).

Ten players were unanimously selected as first-team All-Americans by all seven of the NCAA-recognized selectors. They are: quarterback Charlie Ward of Florida State; running backs Marshall Faulk of San Diego State and LeShon Johnson of Northern Illinois; wide receiver J. J. Stokes of UCLA; center Jim Pyne of Virginia Tech; offensive tackle Aaron Taylor of Notre Dame; defensive tackle Rob Waldrop of Arizona; linebackers Trev Alberts of Nebraska and Derrick Brooks of Florida State; and defensive back Antonio Langham of Alabama. Charlie Ward also won the 1993 Heisman Trophy.

== Offense ==
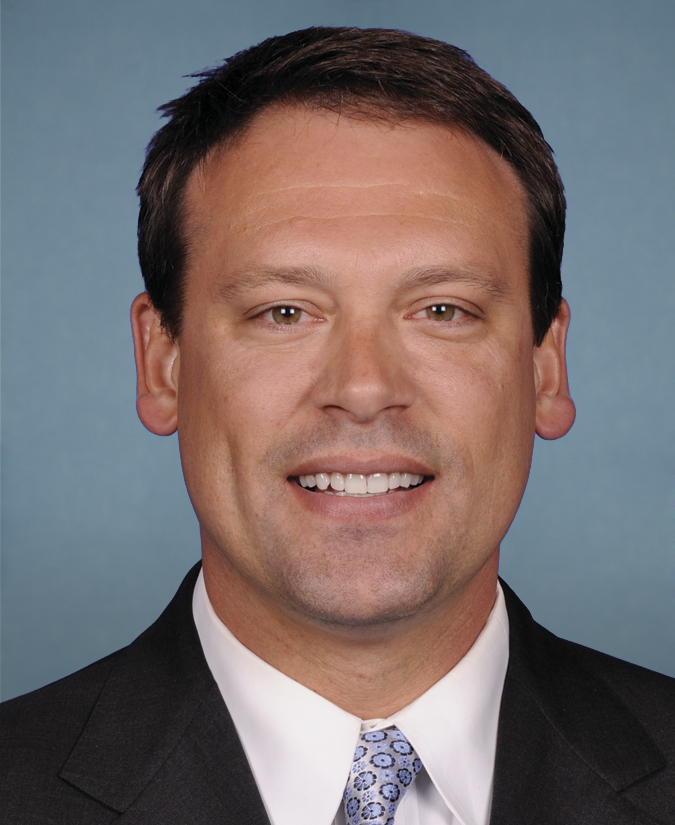
Heath Shuler

=== Quarterback ===
- Charlie Ward, Florida State (CFHOF) (AFCA, AP-1, FN, FWAA, TSN, UPI, WCFF, GNS, NEA-1, SH)
- Heath Shuler, Tennessee (AP-2, GNS, NEA-2)
- Trent Dilfer, Fresno State (AP-3, GNS)

=== Running backs ===
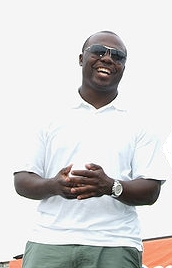
Marshall Faulk

- Marshall Faulk, San Diego State (CFHOF) (AFCA, AP-1, FN, FWAA, TSN, UPI, WCFF, GNS, NEA-1, SH)
- LeShon Johnson, Northern Illinois (AFCA, AP-1, FN, FWAA, TSN, UPI, WCFF, GNS)
- Errict Rhett, Florida (FN, GNS)
- Tyrone Wheatley, Michigan (NEA-1, SH)
- Bam Morris, Texas Tech (AP-2, GNS)
- Brent Moss, Wisconsin (AP-2, NEA-2)
- Calvin Jones, Nebraska (AP-3, NEA-2)
- Napoleon Kaufman, Washington (AP-3)

=== Wide receivers ===
- J. J. Stokes, UCLA (AFCA, AP-1, FN, FWAA, TSN, UPI, WCFF, GNS, NEA-1, SH)
- Johnnie Morton, USC (AFCA, AP-1, FN, FWAA, TSN, GNS, NEA-2, SH)
- Ryan Yarborough, Wyoming (AP-1, FWAA, GNS, NEA-1)
- Charles Johnson, Colorado (AP-2, GNS, NEA-2 [KR])
- Chris Penn, Tulsa (AP-2)
- Bobby Engram, Penn State (AP-3)
- Joey Galloway, Ohio State (AP-3, GNS, NEA-2)

=== Tight end ===
- Pete Mitchell, Boston College (AP-2, TSN, UPI, SH)
- Carlester Crumpler, East Carolina (WCFF, NEA-2)
- Mark Bruener, Washington (AP-3, NEA-1)

=== Tackles ===
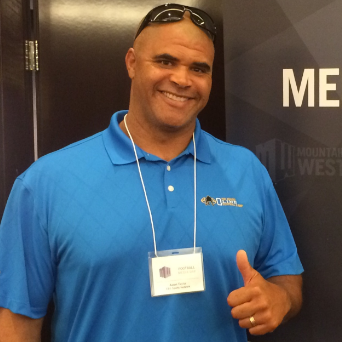
Aaron Taylor

- Aaron Taylor, Notre Dame (AFCA, AP-1, FN, FWAA, TSN, UPI, WCFF, GNS, NEA-1, SH)
- Wayne Gandy, Auburn (AP-1, FWAA, UPI, GNS, NEA-1, SH)
- Korey Stringer, Ohio State (AFCA, AP-2, WCFF, GNS, SH)
- Rich Braham, West Virginia (AFCA, AP-2, UPI, NEA-2)
- Todd Steussie, California (AFCA, AP-2, GNS)
- Marcus Spears, Northwestern State (FWAA, GNS, NEA-2)
- Bernard Williams, Georgia (FN, GNS, NEA-1)
- Joe Panos, Wisconsin (AP-2)
- Zach Wiegert, Nebraska (AP-3)
- Doug Skartvedt, Iowa State (AP-3)
- Vaughn Parker, UCLA (AP-3)
- Jeff Smith, Tennessee (AP-3)
- Ruben Brown, Pittsburgh (GNS)
- Jason Winrow, Ohio State (NEA-2)

=== Guards ===
- Mark Dixon, Virginia (AP-1, FN, FWAA, TSN, UPI, WCFF, NEA-1)
- Stacy Seegars, Clemson (AP-1, FN, TSN, WCFF, NEA-2, SH)

=== Center ===
- Jim Pyne, Virginia Tech (AFCA, AP-1, FN, FWAA, TSN, UPI, WCFF, NEA-1, SH)
- Tim Ruddy, Notre Dame (AP-2)
- Tom Nalen, Boston College (AP-3)
- K. C. Jones, Miami (NEA-2)

== Defense ==
=== Linemen ===
- Rob Waldrop, Arizona (CFHOF) (AFCA, AP-1, FN, FWAA, TSN, UPI, WCFF, GNS, NEA-1, SH)
- Dan Wilkinson, Ohio State (AP-1, FN, FWAA, TSN, UPI, WCFF, GNS, NEA-1, SH)
- Sam Adams, Texas A&M (AFCA, AP-1, FN, TSN, UPI, WCFF, GNS, NEA-1, SH)
- Kevin Patrick, Miami (Fla.) (AFCA, AP-1, UPI, NEA-2)
- Shante Carver, Arizona State (FWAA, TSN, NEA-2)
- Derrick Alexander, Florida State (AP-3, FWAA)
- Bryant Young, Notre Dame (AFCA, AP-2, GNS)
- Lou Benfatti, Penn State (AP-2, WCFF)
- Darren Krein, Miami (AP-2)
- Tedy Bruschi, Arizona (CFHOF) (AP-2)
- William Gaines, Florida (AP-3)
- Lamark Shackerford, Wisconsin (AP-3, NEA-2)
- Henry Ford, Arkansas (AP-3)
- Kevin Mitchell, Syracuse (GNS)
- Joe Johnson, Louisville (GNS)
- Brentson Buckner, Clemson (NEA-1)
- Willie McGinest, USC (NEA-2)

=== Linebackers ===
- Trev Alberts, Nebraska (CFHOF) (AFCA [lineman], AP-1, FN, FWAA, TSN, UPI, WCFF, GNS, NEA-1, SH)
- Derrick Brooks, Florida State (CFHOF) (AFCA, AP-1, FN, FWAA, TSN, UPI, WCFF, GNS, NEA-1, SH)
- Jamir Miller, UCLA (AP-2, FN, TSN, UPI, WCFF, GNS, NEA-1)
- Dana Howard, Illinois (AFCA, AP-1, FN)
- Barron Wortham, UTEP (AP-2, FWAA, NEA-2, SH)
- Sean Harris, Arizona (AP-3, SH)
- Jerrott Willard, California (AP-2)
- DeWayne Dotson, Ole Miss (AP-3)
- Aubrey Beavers, Oklahoma (AP-3, GNS)
- John Thierry, Alcorn State (GNS, NEA-1)
- Marlo Perry, Jackson State (NEA-2)
- Anthony McClanahan, Washington State (NEA-2)
- Keith Burns, Oklahoma State (NEA-2)

=== Defensive backs ===
- Antonio Langham, Alabama (AFCA, AP-1, FN, FWAA, TSN, UPI, WCFF, GNS, NEA-1, SH)
- Aaron Glenn, Texas A&M (AFCA, AP-1, FWAA, TSN, UPI, WCFF, GNS, SH)
- Jeff Burris, Notre Dame (AP-1, FN, UPI, WCFF, NEA-1)
- Corey Sawyer, Florida State (AP-2, FN, TSN, UPI, WCFF, GNS)
- Jaime Mendez, Kansas St (AFCA, AP-1, FN)
- Bobby Taylor, Notre Dame (AP-3, FWAA, TSN, GNS, NEA-1, SH)
- Bracy Walker, North Carolina (AFCA, AP-2, FWAA, SH)
- Anthony Bridges, Louisville (AP-2)
- Thomas Randolph, Kansas State (AP-2)
- Dexter Seigler, Miami (AP-3)
- Chris Hudson, Colorado (AP-3, GNS)
- Orlando Thomas, Southwestern Louisiana (AP-3)
- Dewayne Washington, NC State (GNS)
- Anthony Phillips, Texas A&I (NEA-1)

== Specialists ==
=== Placekicker ===
- Bjorn Merten, UCLA (AP-1, TSN, WCFF)
- John Becksvoort, Tennessee (FWAA, SH)
- John Stewart, SMU (AFCA)
- Michael Procter, Alabama (AP-2, FN)
- Judd Davis, Florida (AP-3, UPI, NEA-2)
- Pat O'Neill, Syracuse (GNS)
- Tommy Thompson, Oregon (NEA-1)

=== Punter ===
- Terry Daniel, Auburn (AFCA, AP-1, FN, FWAA, TSN, WCFF, GNS, NEA-1, SH)
- Chris MacInnis, Air Force (AP-2)
- Brad Faunce, UNLV (AP-3)

=== All-purpose / kick returners ===
- David Palmer, Alabama (AFCA [WR], AP-1 (all-purpose), FWAA [KR], UPI [KR], TSN [KR], WCFF [WR], GNS [WR], NEA-1 [KR])
- Leeland McElroy, Texas A&M (AP-2 (all-purpose))
- Andre Coleman, Kansas State (AP-3 (all-purpose))

== Key ==
- **Bold** – Used for (1) consensus All-American and (2) first-team selections by an official selector
- CFHOF - Inducted into the College Football Hall of Fame
- -1 – First-team selection
- -2 – Second-team selection
- -3 – Third-team selection

=== Official selectors ===
- AFCA = American Football Coaches Association for Kodak
- AP = Associated Press
- FN = Football News
- FWAA = Football Writers Association of America
- TSN = The Sporting News
- UPI = United Press International
- WCFF = Walter Camp Football Foundation selected by NCAA Division I-A coaches and sports information directors

=== Other selectors ===
- GNS = Gannett News Service
- NEA = Newspaper Enterprise Association
- SH = Scripps Howard News Service

== See also ==
- 1993 All-Atlantic Coast Conference football team
- 1993 All-Big Eight Conference football team
- 1993 All-Big Ten Conference football team
- 1993 All-Pacific-10 Conference football team
- 1993 All-SEC football team
