= Corey Sawyer =

American football player (born 1971)

No. 23, 29, 8
- Position: Cornerback

Personal information
- Born: October 4, 1971 (age 55); Key West, Florida, U.S.
- Listed height: 5 ft 11 in (1.80 m)
- Listed weight: 177 lb (80 kg)

Career information
- High school: Key West
- College: Florida State
- NFL draft: 1994: 4th round, 104th overall pick

Career history
- Cincinnati Bengals (1994–1998); New York Jets (1999); Memphis Maniax (2001); Tampa Bay Storm (2002–2003); Chicago Rush (2004)

Awards and highlights
- ArenaBowl champion (2003); Consensus national champion (1993); Consensus All-American (1993); Second-team All-American (1992); 2× First-team All-ACC (1992, 1993)

Career NFL statistics
- Tackles: 164
- Interceptions: 11
- Forced fumbles: 3
- Sacks: 3.5
- Stats at Pro Football Reference

Career AFL statistics
- Tackles: 119
- Passes defended: 33
- Interceptions: 9
- Stats at ArenaFan.com

Corey Franklyn Sawyer (born October 4, 1971) is an American former professional football player who was a cornerback for six seasons in the National Football League (NFL) during the 1990s. He played college football for the Florida State Seminoles, earning consensus All-American honors in 1993. He played professionally for the Cincinnati Bengals and New York Jets of the NFL, the Memphis Maniax of the XFL, and the Tampa Bay Storm and Chicago Rush of the Arena Football League (AFL).

== Early life ==
Sawyer was born in Key West, Florida. He graduated from Key West High School, where he played high school football for the Key West Conchs.

== College career ==
Sawyer accepted an athletic scholarship to attend Florida State University, where he played for the Florida State Seminoles football team from 1990 to 1993. He was recognized as a consensus first-team All-American at defensive back as a senior in 1993, and was a member of the Seminoles' team that defeated the Nebraska Cornhuskers 18–16 in the Orange Bowl to win the Bowl Coalition national championship.

== Professional career ==
The Cincinnati Bengals selected Sawyer in the fourth round (104th pick overall) of the 1994 NFL draft. He played for the Bengals from 1994 to 1998. He played in 60 regular season games for the Bengals, mostly as a backup at cornerback, but also as a punt and kickoff returner. In his five seasons in Cincinnati, he returned 54 punts for 507 yards and a touchdown, and 15 kickoffs for 305 yards. As a defensive back, he compiled 163 tackles and 11 interceptions for 163 return yards and a touchdown. He also played one NFL season as a backup for the New York Jets in 1999.

He played for the Memphis Maniax of the XFL in 2001. He played for the Tampa Bay Storm and Chicago Rush of the Arena Football League (AFL) from 2002 to 2004.

== NFL career statistics ==
Legend
**Bold**	Career high

Year	Team	Games		Tackles				Interceptions				Fumbles			
Year	Team	GP	GS	Comb	Solo	Ast	Sck	Int	Yds	TD	Lng	FF	FR	Yds	TD
1994	CIN	15	0	31	26	5	0.0	2	0	0	0	0	**1**	0	0
1995	CIN	12	8	**53**	**49**	4	**2.0**	2	**61**	0	**61**	**2**	0	0	0
1996	CIN	15	2	38	32	**6**	1.5	2	0	0	0	1	**1**	0	0
1997	CIN	15	2	31	28	3	0.0	**4**	44	0	37	0	0	0	0
1998	CIN	3	0	10	9	1	0.0	1	58	**1**	58	0	0	0	0
1999	NYJ	5	0	1	1	0	0.0	0	0	0	0	0	0	0	0
Career		65	12	164	145	19	3.5	11	163	1	61	3	2	0	0
