= Antonio Langham =

American football player (born 1972)

No. 38, 43
- Position: Cornerback

Personal information
- Born: July 31, 1972 (age 54); Town Creek, Alabama, U.S.
- Listed height: 6 ft 0 in (1.83 m)
- Listed weight: 190 lb (86 kg)

Career information
- High school: Hazlewood (Town Creek, Alabama)
- College: Alabama
- NFL draft: 1994: 1st round, 9th overall pick
- Expansion draft: 1999: 1st round, 37th overall pick

Career history
- Cleveland Browns (1994–1995); Baltimore Ravens (1996–1997); San Francisco 49ers (1998); Cleveland Browns (1999); New England Patriots (2000)

Awards and highlights
- PFWA All-Rookie Team (1994); Consensus national championship (1992); Unanimous All-American (1993); Third-team All-American (1992); Jim Thorpe Award (1993); Jack Tatum Trophy (1993); 2× First-team All-SEC (1992, 1993); Second-team All-SEC (1991)

Career NFL statistics
- Games played: 102
- Games started: 76
- Tackles: 345
- Interceptions: 14
- Sacks: 1
- Stats at Pro Football Reference
- College Football Hall of Fame

Collie Antonio Langham (born July 31, 1972) is an American former professional football player who was a cornerback in the National Football League (NFL) for seven seasons. He played college football for the University of Alabama, and was recognized as an All-American. Selected by the Cleveland Browns in the first round of the 1994 NFL draft, Langham also played professionally for the Baltimore Ravens, San Francisco 49ers, and New England Patriots of the NFL.

== Early life ==
Langham was born in Town Creek, Alabama. He graduated from Hazlewood High School in Town Creek.

== College career ==
Langham attended the University of Alabama, where he played for the Alabama Crimson Tide football team as a defensive back from 1990 to 1993. On the eventual 1992 national championship team Langham, in his sophomore year, returned an interception for a touchdown late in the 4th quarter of the 1992 SEC Championship Game. As a junior in 1993, he was recognized as a consensus first-team All-American and would win the Jim Thorpe Award as the nation's top defensive back. Later, however, he caused the Crimson Tide to forfeit most of its 1993 season and suffer NCAA sanctions by signing with an agent during the previous offseason. Langham also signed and submitted an application to enter the 1993 NFL draft, rendering him ineligible under NCAA rules, regardless of whether he had signed with an agent or not. The Crimson Tide's head coach, Gene Stallings, failed to inform both the Southeastern Conference (SEC) and the National Collegiate Athletic Association (NCAA) of Langham's draft application, or to declare Langham ineligible as required by NCAA rules. His ineligibility was revealed in late November 1993 and the University of Alabama eventually had to forfeit eight wins and a tie from the 1993 season.

He still holds the Crimson Tide's team record for career interceptions with 19.

== Professional career ==
Pre-draft measurables
| Height | Weight | Arm length | Hand span |
|---|---|---|---|
| 5 ft 11 in (1.80 m) | 180 lb (82 kg) | 32 in (0.81 m) | 8 7/8 in (0.23 m) |

The Cleveland Browns selected Langham in the first round (ninth pick overall) of the 1994 NFL draft, and he played for the Browns during the 1994 and 1995 seasons. He is one of three players to have played for the Cleveland Browns before they became the Baltimore Ravens and return to the Browns after the expansion team formed in 1999; the other players are Jerry Ball and Orlando Brown. His best year as a professional came during the 1996 season as a member of the Baltimore Ravens when he intercepted five passes for 59 yards.

== NFL career statistics ==
| Year | Team | GP | Tackles | | | | Fumbles | | | Interceptions | | | | | |
| Year | Team | GP | Cmb | Solo | Ast | Sck | FF | FR | Yds | Int | Yds | Avg | Lng | TD | PD |
|---|---|---|---|---|---|---|---|---|---|---|---|---|---|---|---|
| 1994 | CLE | 16 | 60 | 54 | 6 | 0.0 | 1 | 0 | 0 | 2 | 2 | 1.0 | 2 | 0 | 27 |
| 1995 | CLE | 16 | 74 | 66 | 8 | 0.0 | 0 | 0 | 0 | 2 | 29 | 14.5 | 29 | 0 | 12 |
| 1996 | BAL | 15 | 52 | 47 | 5 | 0.0 | 1 | 0 | 0 | 5 | 59 | 11.8 | 28 | 0 | 20 |
| 1997 | BAL | 16 | 59 | 53 | 6 | 1.0 | 0 | 0 | 0 | 3 | 40 | 13.3 | 40 | 1 | 13 |
| 1998 | SF | 11 | 33 | 33 | 0 | 0.0 | 0 | 0 | 0 | 1 | 0 | 0.0 | 0 | 0 | 8 |
| 1999 | CLE | 13 | 26 | 24 | 2 | 0.0 | 1 | 0 | 0 | 0 | 0 | 0.0 | 0 | 0 | 1 |
| 2000 | NE | 15 | 40 | 35 | 5 | 0.0 | 0 | 0 | 0 | 1 | 24 | 24.0 | 24 | 0 | 4 |
| Career | | 102 | 344 | 312 | 32 | 1.0 | 3 | 0 | 0 | 14 | 154 | 11.0 | 40 | 1 | 85 |

== Personal life ==
Langham is a cousin of former NFL players Kerry Goode and Chris Goode.
