= Dave Merritt =

American football player and coach (born 1971)

David Merritt
Kansas City Chiefs
- Title: Secondary coach

Personal information
- Born: September 8, 1971 (age 55); Raleigh, North Carolina, U.S.
- Listed height: 6 ft 1 in (1.85 m)
- Listed weight: 237 lb (108 kg)

Career information
- Position: Linebacker (No. 55, 94, 50)
- High school: Millbrook (Raleigh)
- College: North Carolina State
- NFL draft: 1993: 7th round, 191st overall pick

Career history

Playing
- Miami Dolphins (1993); Phoenix / Arizona Cardinals (1993–1995); Rhein Fire (1997)

Coaching
- Tennessee–Chattanooga (1997) Outside linebackers; VMI (1998) Defensive ends & outside linebackers coach; VMI (1999–2000) Defensive line coach; New York Jets (2001–2003) Defensive assistant & linebackers coach; New York Giants (2004) Defensive assistant & quality control coach; New York Giants (2005) Defensive assistant; New York Giants (2006–2017) Secondary coach & safeties coach; Arizona Cardinals (2018) Defensive backs coach; Kansas City Chiefs (2019–present) Defensive backs coach

Awards and highlights
- 5× Super Bowl champion (XLII, XLVI, LIV, LVII, LVIII); First-team All-ACC (1992)

Career NFL statistics
- Tackles: 1
- Fumble recoveries: 1
- Stats at Pro Football Reference

David Merritt (born September 8, 1971) is an American professional football coach for the Kansas City Chiefs of the National Football League (NFL) and former linebacker who served as the defensive backs coach for the Arizona Cardinals of the NFL. He was selected by the Miami Dolphins in the seventh round of the 1993 NFL draft. He played college football for the NC State Wolfpack.

Merritt also played for the Phoenix/Arizona Cardinals and has been a coach at the University of Tennessee at Chattanooga and Virginia Military Institute and for the New York Jets.

== Early life ==
Merritt was born in Raleigh, North Carolina. He attended Millbrook High School (Raleigh, North Carolina). Merritt was a member of the Millbrook High School inaugural Hall of Fame class in 2012

== Coaching career ==
=== New York Jets ===
In 2001, Merritt joined the New York Jets as a defensive assistant and linebackers coach.

=== New York Giants ===
Merritt was hired by the New York Giants as a defensive assistant and quality control coach in 2004. In 2006, he was promoted to secondary and safeties coach. Merritt won Super Bowl XLII and Super Bowl XLVI with the Giants, both times defeating the New England Patriots.

=== Arizona Cardinals ===
On February 21, 2018, Merritt was hired by the Arizona Cardinals as their new defensive backs coach.

=== Kansas City Chiefs ===
On February 8, 2019, Merritt was hired by the Kansas City Chiefs as their new defensive backs coach. Merritt won his third Super Bowl ring when the Chiefs defeated the San Francisco 49ers in Super Bowl LIV. Merritt got his fourth championship ring with the Chiefs as they defeated the Philadelphia Eagles in Super Bowl LVII. Merritt won his fifth Super Bowl when the Chiefs defeated the 49ers in Super Bowl LVIII.

== Personal life ==
On April 23, 2026, Merritt was arrested in Overland Park, Kansas on suspicion of domestic battery. On May 7, the charge against Merritt was dismissed.
