= Craig Keith =

American football player (born 1971)

No. 85, 87, 88
- Position: Tight end

Personal information
- Born: April 27, 1971 (age 55); Raleigh, North Carolina, U.S.
- Listed height: 6 ft 3 in (1.91 m)
- Listed weight: 262 lb (119 kg)

Career information
- High school: Millbrook (Raleigh)
- College: Lenoir–Rhyne (1989–1992)
- NFL draft: 1993: 7th round, 189th overall pick

Career history
- Pittsburgh Steelers (1993–1994); Jacksonville Jaguars (1995); Miami Dolphins (1996)*; San Francisco 49ers (1996)*
- * Offseason or practice squad member only

Career NFL statistics
- Receptions: 4
- Receiving yards: 22
- Receiving TDs: 0
- Stats at Pro Football Reference

Craig Carlton Keith (born April 27, 1971) is an American former professional football player who was a tight end for three seasons in the National Football League (NFL) with the Pittsburgh Steelers and Jacksonville Jaguars. He was selected by the Steelers in the seventh round of the 1993 NFL draft after playing college football for the Lenoir–Rhyne Bears.

== Early life ==
Craig Carlton Keith was born on April 27, 1971, in Raleigh, North Carolina. He attended Millbrook High School in Raleigh.

== College career ==
Keith was a member of the Bears of Lenoir–Rhyne College from 1989 to 1992. He caught 62 passes for 723 yards and four touchdowns during his college career. He earned All-South Atlantic Conference honors in 1991 and 1992 and was also an NAIA Division I honorable mention All-American in 1992. Keith graduated from Lenoir–Rhyne with a bachelor's in 1995 and an MBA in 2000. He was inducted into the school's athletics hall of fame in 2016.

== Professional career ==
Keith was selected by the Pittsburgh Steelers in the seventh round, with the 189th overall pick, of the 1993 NFL draft. He officially signed with the team on June 3. He played in one game for the Steelers during the 1993 season. Keith appeared in all 16 games, starting one, in 1994, catching one pass for two yards on two targets. He also played in one playoff game that year. He was used on special teams and as a backup tight end during his stint with the Steelers.

On August 24, 1995, the Steelers traded Keith to the Jacksonville Jaguars for an undisclosed 1996 draft pick. He played in 11 games, starting two, for the Jaguars during the team's inaugural 1995 season, recording three receptions for 20 yards on three targets. He became a free agent after the season.

Keith signed with the Miami Dolphins on April 26, 1996. He was released on July 25, 1996.

He was signed by the San Francisco 49ers on July 29, 1996, but was released two days later.

== Personal life ==
Keith served as the special assistant to the athletics director at Lenoir–Rhyne from 1998 to 2000 and as the associate director for the Center for Student Leadership, Ethics and Public Service at North Carolina State University from 2000 to 2002. He later started a carwash company called Bull City Carwash.
