= Lemanski Hall =

American football player and coach (born 1970)

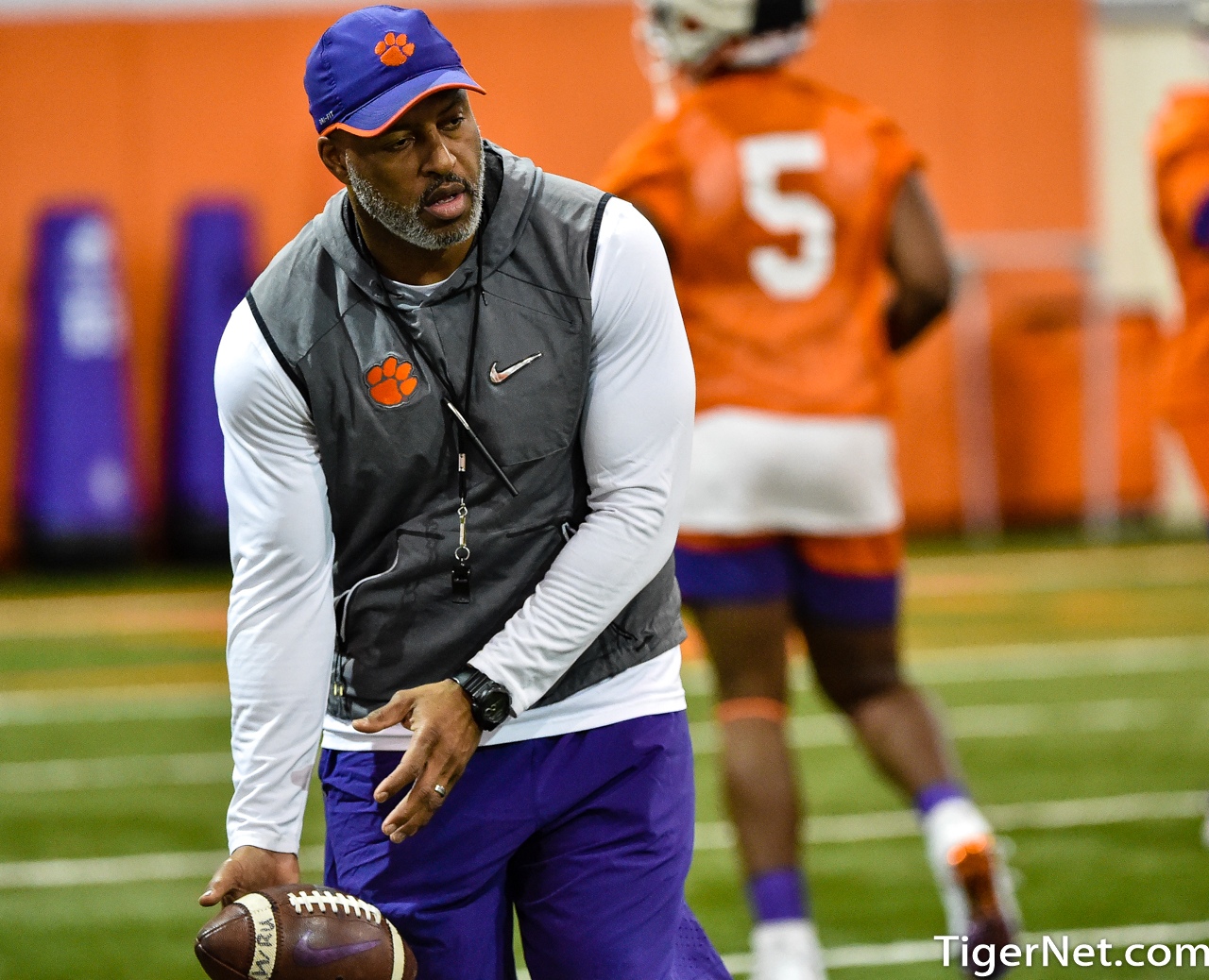

No. 51, 53, 55
- Positions: Linebacker, defensive end

Personal information
- Born: November 24, 1970 (age 55); Valley, Alabama, U.S.
- Listed height: 6 ft 0 in (1.83 m)
- Listed weight: 234 lb (106 kg)

Career information
- High school: Valley
- College: Alabama
- NFL draft: 1994: 7th round, 220th overall pick

Career history

Playing
- Houston/Tennessee Oilers (1994–1997); Chicago Bears (1998); Dallas Cowboys (1999); Minnesota Vikings (2000–2002)

Coaching
- Clemson (2015–2016) Defensive analyst; Clemson (2017) Senior defensive analyst; Clemson (2018–2023) Defensive ends coach

Awards and highlights
- As a player: National champion (1992); 2× First-team All-SEC (1992, 1993); As a coach: 2× CFP national champion (2016, 2018)

Career NFL statistics
- Tackles: 136
- Fumble recoveries: 4
- Sacks: 4
- Stats at Pro Football Reference

Lemanski Hall (born November 24, 1970) is an American football coach and former player. He recently served as the defensive ends coach for Clemson University. He played professionally in the National Football League (NFL) as a linebacker for the Houston/Tennessee Oilers, Chicago Bears, Dallas Cowboys and Minnesota Vikings. He played college football at the University of Alabama.

== Early life ==
Hall attended Valley High School, where he played quarterback, running back, linebacker and defensive back. He was a teammate of future NFL players John Copeland, Josh Evans and Marcus Pollard. As a senior, he rushed for 1,110 yards, 20 touchdowns and also had 20 interceptions, receiving All-State honors at the end of the year.

He accepted a football scholarship from the University of Alabama. As a freshman, he registered 16 special teams tackles. The next year, he was converted from strong safety to outside linebacker.

As a junior, he was named a starter at linebacker, making 70 tackles (led the team), 8 tackles for loss and 5 sacks, while helping the team win the 1992 National Championship team. As a senior, he collected 76 tackles. He finished his college career with 192 tackles, 18 tackles for loss and 8 sacks.

He was named to the Alabama All-Decade team for the 1990s.

== Professional career ==
=== Houston Oilers ===
Hall was selected by the Houston Oilers in the seventh round (220th overall) of the 1994 NFL draft. He was a core special teams player, with his only 2 starts coming in the 1997 season.

On September 1, 1998, he was traded to the Chicago Bears in exchange for a seventh round selection (#213-Mike Green).

=== Chicago Bears ===
In 1998, he was used by the Chicago Bears mainly on special teams, registering 18 special teams tackles (second on the team). He was released on September 5, 1999.

=== Dallas Cowboys ===
On October 27, 1999, he was signed as a free agent by the Dallas Cowboys. Despite not joining the team until the eighth week of the season, he finished with 14 special teams tackles (third on the team).

=== Minnesota Vikings ===
On February 23, 2000, the Minnesota Vikings signed him as a free agent. In 2001, he started 13 games at strongside linebacker, posting 62 tackles (tied for fifth on the team).

On September 1, 2002, he was waived injured after suffering a fracture of the medial orbital wall behind his right eye during training camp. He was re-signed on September 11. He passed Patrick Chukwurah on the depth chart and became a starter. He suffered a high ankle sprain in the fourth game against the Seattle Seahawks and missed 2 contests, giving Nick Rogers an opportunity to pass him on the depth chart. He wasn't re-signed after the season.

== Coaching career ==
After his retirement, he volunteered to coach football at Centennial High School. He was an assistant and strength & conditioning coach at Christ Presbyterian Academy from 2004 to 2006. He also did an internship with the Tennessee Titans through the NFL Diversity Coaching Fellowship. In 2008, he was hired to be a linebackers coach and fitness instructor at Ensworth School.

=== Clemson (2015–2023) ===
In 2015, Hall was hired by Clemson University to be a defensive analyst on the football staff. In 2017 he was promoted to a senior defensive analyst. In 2018, he was promoted to an on field coaching position as the defensive line coach.
