= 1993 All-Atlantic Coast Conference football team =

American college football all-star team

The 1993 All-Atlantic Coast Conference football team consists of American football players chosen by various selectors for their All-Atlantic Coast Conference ("ACC") teams for the 1993 college football season. Selectors in 1993 included the Associated Press (AP).

== Offensive selections ==
=== Wide receivers ===
- Kez McCorvey, Florida St. (AP-1)
- Eddie Goines, NC State (AP-1)
- Jermaine Lewis, Maryland (AP-2)
- Corey Holliday, North Carolina (AP-2)

=== Tackles ===
- Ethan Albright, North Carolina (AP-1)
- Jim Reid, Virginia (AP-1)
- Brent LeJeune, Clemson (AP-2)
- Curtis Parker, North Carolina (AP-2)

=== Guards ===
- Mark Dixon, Virginia (AP-1)
- Stacy Seegars, Clemson (AP-1)
- Shawn Hocker, North Carolina (AP-2)
- Patrick McNeil, Florida St. (AP-2)

=== Centers ===
- Clay Shiver, Florida State (AP-1)
- Todd Ward, NC State (AP-2)

=== Tight ends ===
- Aaron Mundy, Virginia (AP-1)
- Lonnie Johnson, Florida St. (AP-2)

=== Quarterbacks ===
- Charlie Ward, Florida St. (AP-1)
- Jason Stanicek, North Carolina (AP-2)

=== Running backs ===
- Curtis Johnson, North Carolina (AP-1)
- Dorsey Levens, Georgia Tech (AP-1)
- Leon Johnson, North Carolina (AP-2)
- Sean Jackson, Florida St. (AP-2)
- John Leach, Wake Forest (AP-2)

== Defensive selections ==
=== Defensive linemen ===
- Derrick Alexander, Florida St. (AP-1)
- Dred Booe, Wake Forest (AP-1)
- Brentson Buckner, Clemson (AP-1)
- Mike Frederick, Virginia (AP-2)
- Austin Robbins, North Carolina (AP-2)
- Marcus Jones, North Carolina (AP-2)

=== Linebackers ===
- Ken Alexander, Florida St. (AP-1)
- Damien Covington, NC State (AP-1)
- Derrick Brooks, Florida St. (AP-1)
- Tyler Lawrence, NC State (AP-1)
- Tim Jones, Clemson (AP-2)
- Jamal Cox, Georgia Tech (AP-2)
- Bernardo Harris, North Carolina (AP-2)
- Brad Sherrod, Duke (AP-2)

=== Defensive backs ===
- Bracy Walker, North Carolina (AP-1)
- Corey Sawyer, Florida St. (AP-1)
- Clifton Abraham, Florida St. (AP-1)
- Keith Lyle, Virginia (AP-1)
- Dewayne Washington, NC State (AP-2)
- Sean Crocker, North Carolina (AP-2)
- Andre Humphrey, Clemson (AP-2)
- Brian Dawkins, Clemson (AP-2)

== Special teams ==
=== Placekickers ===
- Steve Videtich, NC State (AP-1)
- Nelson Welch, Clemson (AP-2)

=== Punters ===
- Scott Milanovich, Maryland (AP-1)
- Will Brice, Virginia (AP-2)

== Key ==
AP = Associated Press

== See also ==
1993 College Football All-America Team
