= Derrick Alexander (defensive end) =

American football player (born 1973)

No. 90, 94
- Position: Defensive end

Personal information
- Born: November 13, 1973 (age 52); Jacksonville, Florida, U.S.
- Listed height: 6 ft 4 in (1.93 m)
- Listed weight: 277 lb (126 kg)

Career information
- High school: Raines (Jacksonville)
- College: Florida State
- NFL draft: 1995: 1st round, 11th overall pick

Career history
- Minnesota Vikings (1995–1998); Cleveland Browns (1999)

Awards and highlights
- National champion (1993); 2× First-team All-American (1993, 1994); ACC Defensive Player of the Year (1994); 2× First-team All-ACC (1993, 1994)

Career NFL statistics
- Tackles: 228
- Sacks: 20
- Forced fumbles: 5
- Stats at Pro Football Reference

Derrick Laborn Alexander (born November 13, 1973) is an American former professional football player who was a defensive end for the Minnesota Vikings and Cleveland Browns of the National Football League (NFL). He was selected 11th overall from Florida State University in the first round of the 1995 NFL draft ahead of such big names as Hugh Douglas and Warren Sapp.

After Alexander retired, he worked in the front office for the Cleveland Browns for several years. Alexander was inducted into the Florida State Hall of Fame in 2007. From 2011 to 2013 he was the head football coach at Bishop McLaughlin Catholic High School in Spring Hill, Florida.

== NFL career statistics ==
Legend
**Bold**	Career high

=== Regular season ===
Year	Team	Games		Tackles					Interceptions					Fumbles			
Year	Team	GP	GS	Cmb	Solo	Ast	Sck	TFL	Int	Yds	TD	Lng	PD	FF	FR	Yds	TD
1995	MIN	15	12	34	22	12	2.0	-	-	-	0	-	-	2	**1**	0	0
1996	MIN	12	9	48	33	15	3.5	-	-	-	0	-	-	0	**1**	**3**	0
1997	MIN	14	14	51	35	**16**	4.5	-	-	-	0	-	-	**3**	**1**	0	0
1998	MIN	**16**	**16**	42	**37**	5	**7.5**	-	-	-	0	-	-	0	0	0	0
1999	CLE	**16**	**16**	**53**	**37**	**16**	2.5	**5**	-	-	0	-	**1**	0	0	0	0
Career		73	67	228	164	64	20.0	5	-	-	-	-	1	5	3	3	0

=== Playoffs ===
Year	Team	Games		Tackles					Interceptions					Fumbles			
Year	Team	GP	GS	Cmb	Solo	Ast	Sck	TFL	Int	Yds	TD	Lng	PD	FF	FR	Yds	TD
1996	MIN	1	0	2	2	0	**1.0**	-	-	-	0	-	-	0	0	0	0
1997	MIN	1	0	0	0	0	0	-	-	-	0	-	-	0	0	0	0
1998	MIN	**2**	**2**	**6**	**3**	**3**	0	-	-	-	0	-	-	0	0	0	0
Career		4	2	8	5	3	1.0	-	-	-	-	-	0	0	0	0	0
