= Harold Bishop (American football) =

American football player (born 1970)

No. 89, 84
- Position: Tight end

Personal information
- Born: April 8, 1970 (age 56); Booneville, Mississippi, U.S.
- Listed height: 6 ft 4 in (1.93 m)
- Listed weight: 254 lb (115 kg)

Career information
- High school: Central East (Tuscaloosa, Alabama)
- College: LSU
- NFL draft: 1994: 3rd round, 69th overall pick

Career history
- Tampa Bay Buccaneers (1994); Cleveland Browns (1995); Baltimore Ravens (1996); Washington Redskins (1996); Rhein Fire (1998); Pittsburgh Steelers (1998–1999)

Awards and highlights
- Second-team All-SEC (1993)

Career NFL statistics
- Receptions: 19
- Receiving yards: 161
- Stats at Pro Football Reference

Harold Lucius Bishop Jr. (born April 8, 1970) is an American former professional football player who was a tight end in the National Football League (NFL) for five teams.

He played college football at Louisiana State University from 1989 to 1994. He was selected by the Tampa Bay Buccaneers in the 1994 NFL draft with the 69th overall pick. In the 1995 off season the Buccaneers traded Bishop to the Cleveland Browns for the 35th pick in the second round of the 1996 NFL draft and selected Mike Alstott with the pick. He was on the team when the Browns became the Baltimore Ravens. He played one season in NFL Europe with the Rhein Fire, who won the World Bowl in 1998. Bishop then signed with the Pittsburgh Steelers and played with them from 1998 to 1999.
