= 1992 All-SEC football team =

American college football all-star team

The 1992 All-SEC football team consists of American football players selected to the All-Southeastern Conference (SEC) chosen by various selectors for the 1992 college football season.

The Alabama Crimson Tide won the conference, beating the Florida Gators 28 to 21 in the inaugural SEC Championship game. The Crimson Tide then won a national championship, defeating the Miami Hurricanes 34 to 13 in the Sugar Bowl.

Georgia running back Garrison Hearst was voted SEC Player of the Year.

== Offensive selections ==
=== Quarterbacks ===
- Shane Matthews, Florida (AP-1, Coaches-1)
- Eric Zeier, Georgia (AP-2)

=== Running backs ===
- Garrison Hearst, Georgia (AP-1, Coaches-1)
- Cory Philpot, Ole Miss (AP-1)
- James Bostic, Auburn (AP-2, Coaches-1)
- Errict Rhett, Florida (AP-2)
- Derrick Lassic, Alabama (AP-2)

=== Wide receivers ===
- Andre Hastings, Georgia (AP-1, Coaches-1)
- Willie Jackson, Florida (AP-1, Coaches-1)
- Willie Harris, Miss. St. (AP-2)

=== Centers ===
- Tobie Sheils, Alabama (AP-1, Coaches-1)
- Lee Ford, Miss. St. (AP-2)

=== Guards ===
- Ernest Dye, South Carolina (AP-2, Coaches-1)
- Todd Perry, Kentucky (AP-2)
- Chris Gray, Auburn (AP-2)
- Tom Watson, Florida (AP-2)

=== Tackles ===
- Everett Lindsay, Ole Miss (AP-1, Coaches-1)
- John James, Miss. St. (AP-1, Coaches-1)
- Mike Stowell, Tennessee (AP-1, Coaches-1)
- Alec Millen, Georgia (AP-1)
- Kevin Mawae, LSU (AP-2)

=== Tight ends ===
- Pat Akos, Vanderbilt (AP-1)
- Kirk Botkin, Arkansas (AP-2, Coaches-1)

== Defensive selections ==
=== Ends ===
- John Copeland, Alabama (AP-1, Coaches-1)
- Eric Curry, Alabama (AP-1, Coaches-1)
- Gary Rogers, Vanderbilt (AP-2)
- Willie Whitehead, Auburn (AP-2)
- Kevin Carter, Florida (AP-2)

=== Tackles ===
- Chad Brown, Ole Miss (AP-1)
- Bo Davis, LSU (AP-2)

=== Linebackers ===
- Todd Kelly, Tennessee (AP-1, Coaches-1 [as E])
- Mitch Davis, Georgia (AP-1, Coaches-1)
- Daniel Boyd, Miss. St. (AP-1)
- Carlton Miles, Florida (AP-1)
- Derrick Oden, Alabama (Coaches-1)
- Antonio London, Alabama (AP-2, Coaches-1)
- Lemanski Hall, Alabama (AP-2, Coaches-1)
- James Willis, Auburn (Coaches-1)
- Karekin Cunningham, Auburn (AP-2)
- DeWayne Dotson, Ole Miss (AP-2)
- Marty Moore, Kentucky (AP-2)

=== Cornerbacks ===
- Antonio Langham, Alabama (AP-1, Coaches-1)
- Johnny Dixon, Ole Miss (Coaches-1)

=== Safeties ===
- George Teague, Alabama (AP-1, Coaches-1)
- Greg Tremble, Georgia (AP-1)
- Jeff Brothers, Vanderbilt (AP-2)
- Will White, Florida (AP-2, Coaches-1)
- Kelvin Knight, Miss. St. (AP-2)
- Danny Boyd, Ole Miss (AP-2)

== Special teams ==
=== Kicker ===
- Scott Etheridge, Auburn (AP-1, Coaches-1)
- Michael Proctor, Alabama (AP-2)
- Doug Pelfrey, Kentucky (AP-2)

=== Punter ===
- Todd Jordan, Miss. St. (AP-1, Coaches-1)
- Pete Raether, Arkansas (AP-1)
- Terry Daniel, Auburn (AP-2)

== Key ==
AP = Associated Press

Coaches = selected by the SEC coaches

Bold = Consensus first-team selection by both AP and Coaches

== See also ==
- 1992 College Football All-America Team
