= Millbrook High School (North Carolina) =

Public school in North Carolina, United States

Coordinates: 35.8657062°N 78.6038915°W

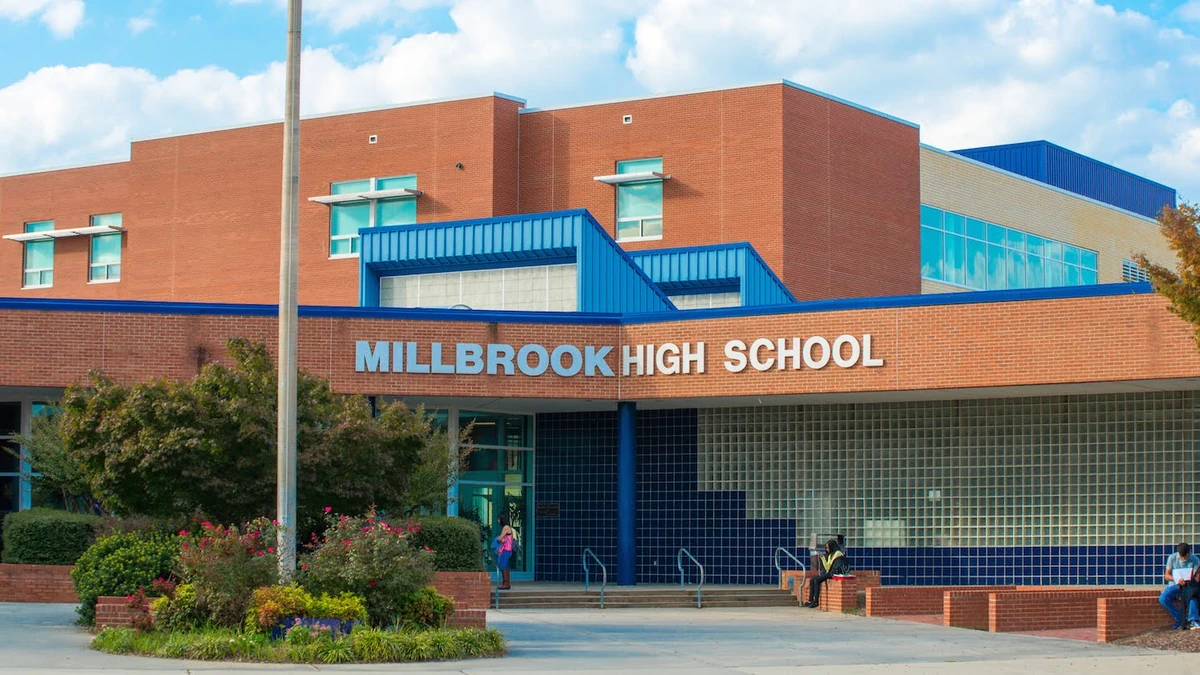
- Millbrook High School, March 2024

Location
- 2201 Spring Forest Road; Raleigh, North Carolina 27615; United States

Information
- Type: Public
- Established: 1922 (104 years ago)
- School district: Wake County Public School System
- CEEB code: 342620
- Principal: Monica Sawyer
- Staff: 136.70 (on an FTE basis)
- Enrollment: 2,455 (2023–2024)
- Student to teacher ratio: 17.96
- Schedule: A/B Block, 8 classes
- Hours in school day: Monday–Friday; 7:25 A.M–2:20 P.M
- Colors: Navy and white
- Athletics: NCHSAA 8A
- Athletics conference: CAP 8A
- Mascot: Wiley the Wildcat
- Team name: Wildcats
- Newspaper: Cat Talk
- Yearbook: The Laurel
- Website: Millbrook Magnet High School

Millbrook Magnet High School, commonly known as Millbrook High School (MHS), is a public magnet high school located in Raleigh, North Carolina. It is one of thirty-two high schools in the Wake County Public School System. In 2006, Millbrook finished the renovation of its campus which includes a new three-level building, a courtyard for students, and a larger cafeteria making MHS one of the largest and up to date facilities in the area. In 2009, Millbrook High School was granted International Baccalaureate status by the North Carolina Board of Education. The school was named a Magnet School of Excellence by Magnet Schools of America in 2020 and 2024 for its innovative curriculum, strong community building, and success in removing barriers to student success.

== History ==
Principals:

- A.E Fussel (1956-1957)
- F.B Williams (1958-1966)
- John Rooks (1967-1969)
- Ronald E. Cobb Jr. (1970-1977)
- Linwood C. Johnson (1978-1981)
- Victor V. Langston (1982-1986)
- David Bryant (1987-1988)
- Roy Teel (1989-1993)
- David Rocefeller (1995-2003)
- Dana King (2004-2022)
- Brian Saunders (2023-2025)
- Monica Sawyer (2026–present)

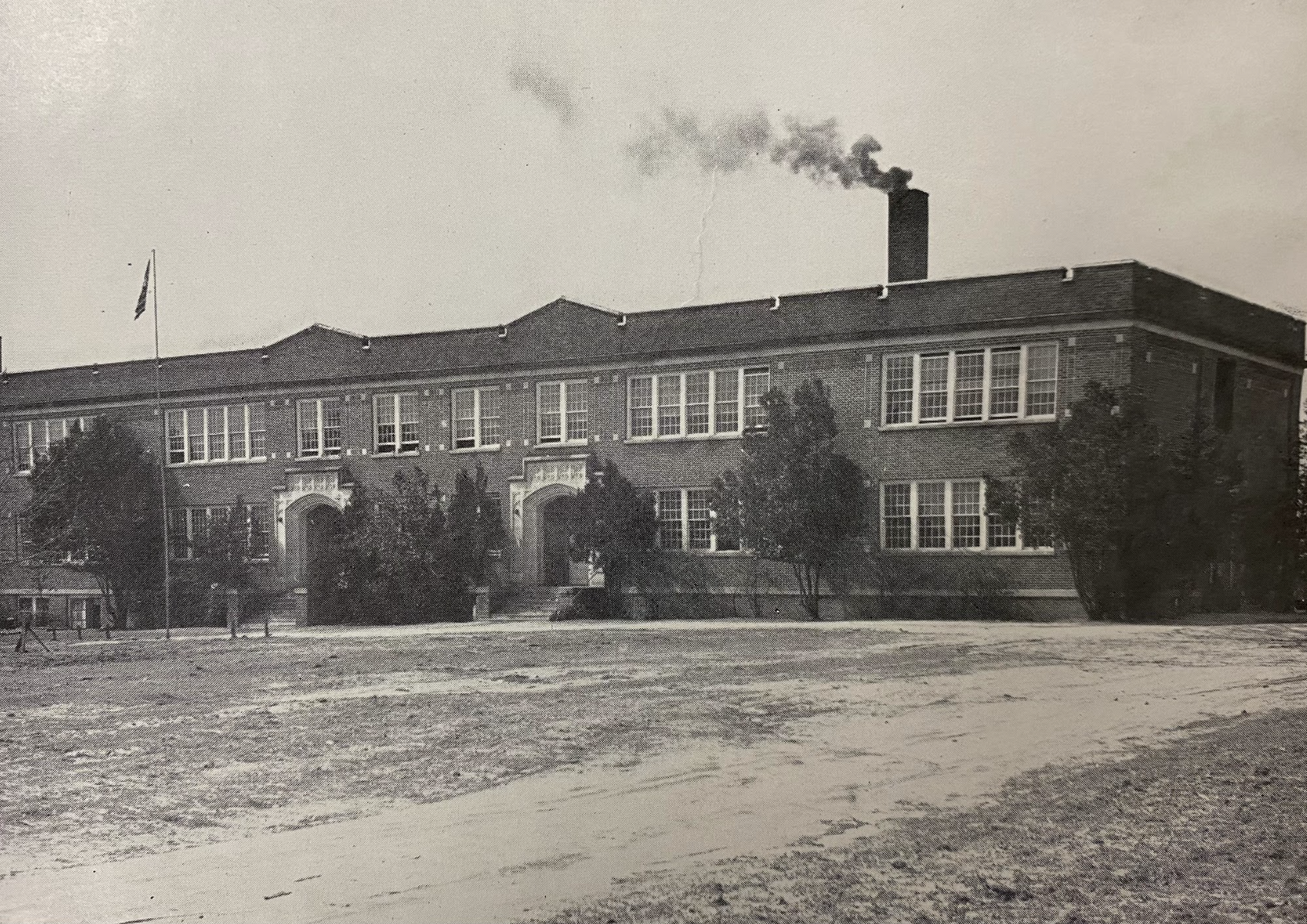
Millbrook's first academic building, circa 1947

== Academics ==
=== IB Programme ===
Millbrook is an International Baccalaureate world school. The program is a two-stage academic course that brings together highly motivated and engaged students and teachers in classrooms that dig deep into content critical thinking, and the impact of perspective on student understanding.

==== Middle Years Programme ====
All Millbrook students are automatically enrolled in the IB Middle Years Programme (MYP) at the start of their freshman year. It was created to prepare students for the academic rigor of the IB Diploma Programme, but students may receive benefits regardless of their intentions to continue in the IB curriculum. The most notable aspect of the program is the Personal Project which students complete in their sophomore year English class. This year-long assignment invites students to explore an area of personal interest, document their progress, and present their final product to an audience of teachers and peers.

==== Diploma Programme ====
The IB Diploma Programme is a voluntary course of study that educates students with interdisciplinary practices and prepares them for the rigor and self-discipline of higher education. The curriculum includes the extended essay, a 4000-word student-directed research project on a subject of their choice. Those interested in participating in the IB Diploma Programme are encouraged to start taking a second language class as soon as possible for the program.

==== IB Courses Offered ====
- IB Anthropology
- IB Biology l & ll
- IB Chemistry
- IB Chinese l & ll
- IB Computer Science
- IB Dance l & ll
- IB Environmental Science
- IB French l & ll
- IB History of the Americas
- IB History SL
- IB Language and Literature l & ll
- IB Latin l & ll
- IB Math Applications and Interpretation l & ll
- IB Music l & ll
- IB Physics l & ll
- IB Spanish l & ll
- IB Theatre l & ll
- IB Theory of Knowledge l & ll
- IB Visual Arts l & ll
- IB World Religions

==== AP Courses Offered ====
- AP 2D Art & Design
- AP Biology
- AP Calc AB
- AP Calc AB/BC
- AP Chemistry
- AP Computer Science
- AP English Language and Composition
- AP English Literature and Composition
- AP Environmental Science
- AP United States Government and Politics
- AP Human Geography
- AP Physics
- AP Precalculus
- AP Psychology
- AP Spanish
- AP Statistics
- AP United States History
- AP World History

==== Schedules ====
Millbrook operates on A/B day schedule, where, unlike traditional semester-long classes, students alternate between a set of four 90-minute long classes one day, and another four the next. This divides an eight-period day over two school days. Due to the modified schedule, all finals are taken at the end of year school year, instead of in the middle like traditional semester courses.

== Athletics ==
The athletics department houses forty athletic teams including varsity, junior varsity, and freshman levels, who all compete in the North Carolina High School Athletic Association (NCHSAA). The school is a member of the CAP 8 Conference and are classified as an 8A school, the highest division in the state.

=== Sports teams ===
- Baseball
- Basketball (men's & women's)
- Cheer & Stunt
- Cross Country (men's & women's)
- Football
- Golf (men's & women's)
- Gymnastics
- Indoor Track (men's & women's)
- Lacrosse (men's & women's)
- Swim & Dive (men's & women's)
- Soccer (men's & women's)
- Softball
- Tennis (men's & women's)
- Track & Field (men's & women's)
- Volleyball
- Wrestling (men's & women's)

Club Sports

- Wildcats Hockey
- Men's Volleyball
- Women's Flag Football

=== State Championships ===
- Basketball
  - Men's – 2021
  - Women's – 2012, 2013, 2016
- Cheer & Stunt – 1992, 2009, 2011, 2016
- Cross Country – 1993
- Golf
  - Men's – 1985, 1988, 1990, 1994, 1995, 1996
- Gymnastics – 1992, 1994, 1995, 1999, 2011, 2021, 2022
- Swim & Dive – 1995, 1996
- Soccer
  - Men's — 1994
  - Women's – 1989
- Tennis
  - Men's – 1999, 2009, 2013
- Track & Field
  - Indoor – 2020
  - Outdoor – 2021
- Volleyball – 1991, 1993, 1995, 2022

== Arts ==
=== Choir ===
The current choir director is Mr. Eddie Adams, who has been teaching at Millbrook High School for more than a decade. Several different choir classes are offered and many of the higher level groups are award-winning. These are the current choir classes being offered:

- Novum: Beginning level non-audition choir for students with little to no experience in music
- Ingen: Beginning/intermediate level choir for baritones, basses, and tenors
- Chamber: Intermediate level audition choir for sopranos and altos
- Celeste: A select intermediate/advanced audition choir for primarily juniors and seniors. Members of this group take two choir classes, typically participating in Novum or Chamber in addition to Celeste.
- Madrigals: The most advanced audition choir offered at Millbrook consisting of sopranos, altos, tenors, baritones, and basses. This is a blocked class, so members will take choir everyday rather than every other day.

=== Band ===
Millbrook offers 3 three types of band classes: Wind Ensemble, Symphonic Band, and Percussion Ensemble.

- Wind Ensemble: This is the highest level course that is for brass, wind, and percussion instruments. In the past, Millbrook's Wind Ensemble has won numerous awards, such as Presidents Cup, international Music Festival, and Superiors at MPA (Music Performance Assessment)
- Symphonic Band: Mostly consisting of underclassmen, this course primarily uses brass and woodwind instruments. The class has fewer students than wind ensemble, but they have also won numerous Superiors at MPA.
- Percussion Ensemble: Only consists of percussion instruments, such as xylophone, snare, bass drum, and drum set. They help with Symphonic band, providing them with background music and tempo. (Created in the 2023-2024 school year)

==== Extracurriculars offered ====
- Marching Band: Starts in the Fall, they compete at various competitions throughout the season, and they perform at Millbrook football games, providing music for Color Guard to perform to. In the past two years, have won Grand Champ a total of five times.
- Winter Guard: Just like Color Guard, but they perform without the marching band. They attend their own competitions, and use equipment such as flag, rifle, and sabre. In the 2022-2023 season, they won first place at Championships in their class.
- Jazz Band: Consists of Saxophone, Brass Instruments, Drum Set, and Bass Guitar. They are a small group that practices after school twice a week. They perform in the school's musical each year, providing background music. They also perform in their own concert with the rest of the band groups, and do special Christmas Performances during Spirit Week in the winter. They attend many Jazz Festivals and participate in MPA.

=== Theater ===
The Theater department offers students numerous course levels in Academic, Honors, and IB Levels. The courses are offered as follows:

1. Theatre Beginning (Honors)
2. Theatre Intermediate (Honors)
3. Theatre Proficient (Honors) / IB Theatre I (HL & SL)
4. Theatre Advanced (Honors) / IB Theatre II (HL & SL)

Throughout the year, students get prompts to act out, while practicing memorization and projection skills. Proficient and Advanced get to perform class plays in the middle of each school year. This is an evening event that parents, friends, and other students can attend.

==== Tech Theatre ====
Tech Theatre offers different level courses as well, but they learn technological skills behind performances on the stage, such as lighting and sound. Tech Theatre also helps to prepare for Millbrook's Fall Play and Spring Musical. The courses offered are as follows:

- Tech Theatre Beginning (Honors)
- Tech Theatre Intermediate (Honors)
- Tech Theatre Proficient (Honors)
- Tech Theatre Advanced (Honors)

=== Dance ===
Millbrook offers up to four courses for Dance. Each year, the classes perform in a winter and spring concert. The courses are offered as follows:

1. Dance Beginning (Honors)
2. Dance Intermediate (Honors)
3. Dance Advanced (Honors)
4. Dance Proficient (Honors) [Also called Company]

==== Dance Team ====
A small group of students who try out each year to perform in football games, pep rallies, basketball games. Occasionally perform at other athletic games if they are asked to. Starting in the 2025 season, Dance Team is expected to compete in various competitions. They have special jerseys that they wear for each performance, and exclusively do routines in the style of hip hop for athletic events, but are well versed in all genres of dance. Dance Team also does cheers in the bleachers alongside Marching Band and Winter Guard at Football games.

=== Visual Arts ===
Millbrook High Schools offers many course levels for both visual arts and sculpture/ceramics. Typically, students progress in each course every year, and move up to the next class level. The course levels are as follows:

1. Visual Arts Beginning (Honors) / Sculpture/Ceramics VAS Beginning (Honors)
2. Visual Arts Intermediate (Honors) / Sculpture/Ceramics VAS Intermediate (Honors)
3. Visual Arts Proficient (Honors) / Sculpture/Ceramics VAS Proficient (Honors)
4. Visual Arts Advanced (Honors) [AP Art] / Sculpture/Ceramics VAS Advanced (Honors)

== Clubs & Organizations ==
=== Student Led ===
1. Art Club
2. Best Buds
3. Black Student Union
4. Chinese Club
5. Crochet Club
6. Culture Club
7. GearCats FIRST Robotics Competition Team
8. Key Club
9. K-Pop Club
10. Latin Club
11. Millbrook Pride Dance Team
12. Multimedia Gaming
13. Muslim Student Alliance
14. Pickleball Club
15. Psychology Club
16. Service Club
17. Science Olympiad
18. Women's Health Outreach Advocates

=== Organizations ===
1. FCCLA (Family, Career, and Community Leaders of America)
2. Fellowship of Christian Athletes
3. Future Farmers of America (FFA)
4. Millbrook Executive Board (MEB)

=== Honor Societies ===
1. National Achievers Society
2. National Art Honor Society
3. Mu Alpha Theta (Math Honor Society)
4. National English Honor Society
5. French Honor Society
6. National Latin Honors Society
7. Music Honor Society
8. Science National Honor Society
9. Spanish Honor Society

== Demographics ==
=== As of the 2023-2024 school year ===
2,421 total students

- 46.2% White
- 25.9% Black
- 20.7% Hispanic
- 3.6% Two or More Races
- 3.1% Asian
- Other <1%

127 certified teachers

== Notable alumni ==
Name	Class Year	Notability
Robert L. Barker	1951	North Carolina Senator
George A. Fisher Jr.	1960	Former United States Army officer
Dean Debnam	1972	President and CEO, Public Policy Polling
Everett Lindsay	1988?	NFL offensive lineman
Paul Shuey	1988	MLB pitcher
Bucky Brooks	1989	Former NFL player who is a sportswriter covering the NFL for Sports Illustrated
Craig Keith	1989	NFL tight end
David Merritt	1989	Former NFL player and current NFL coach
Evan Brown	2005	Professional soccer player
Martha Nichols	2005	American choreographer and dancer
Ferrety Sousa	2008	Professional soccer player
Keith Marshall	2012	NFL running back
Brian Miller	2013	MLB outfielder
Rickey Thompson	2014	American actor, comedian, and internet personality
Chris Clemons	2015	NBA player
James Smith-Williams	2015	NFL defensive lineman
Larry Rountree III	2017	NFL running back for the Los Angeles Chargers
Tyler Snead	2018	CFL wide receiver for the Montreal Alouettes
Diego Pounds	2021	Offensive tackle for the Kansas City Chiefs, standout with the Ole Miss Rebels
