= DeWayne Dotson =

American football player (born 1971)

No. 59, 49
- Positions: Linebacker, fullback

Personal information
- Born: June 10, 1971 (age 55); Nashville, Tennessee, U.S.
- Listed height: 6 ft 1 in (1.85 m)
- Listed weight: 250 lb (113 kg)

Career information
- High school: Hendersonville (Hendersonville, Tennessee)
- College: Ole Miss
- NFL draft: 1994: 4th round, 131st overall pick

Career history

Playing
- Dallas Cowboys (1994)*; Miami Dolphins (1994–1997); Nashville Kats (1999–2000)
- * Offseason or practice squad member only

Coaching
- White House High School (Ten.) (2007–2014) Volunteer Offensive line / linebackers

Awards and highlights
- Third-team All-American (1993); First-team All-SEC (1993); Second-team All-SEC (1992)

Career NFL statistics
- Fumble recoveries: 1
- Stats at Pro Football Reference

Career AFL statistics
- Total tackles: 17
- Sacks: 2
- Pass deflections: 1
- Rushing yards: 33
- Receiving yards: 21
- Stats at ArenaFan.com

Jack DeWayne Dotson (born June 10, 1971) is an American former professional football player who was a linebacker and fullback for the Miami Dolphins of the National Football League (NFL). He played college football for the Ole Miss Rebels. He was selected in the fourth round of the 1994 NFL draft by the Dallas Cowboys. He also was a member of the Nashville Kats in the Arena Football League (AFL).

== Early life ==
Dotson attended Hendersonville High School, where he was a three-year starter at linebacker and a two-year starter at running back. As a senior, he rushed for a school record 1,500 yards, while making 114 tackles on defense and receiving All-state honors at linebacker.

== College career ==
Dotson accepted a football scholarship from the University of Tennessee. As a freshman in 1989, he was a backup defensive end on a team that won the SEC championship and the 1990 Cotton Bowl against the University of Arkansas. He tallied 14 tackles (one for loss).

As a sophomore in 1990, he became a starter at linebacker, posting 59 tackles (fourth on the team), 4 tackles for loss (fourth on the team), 4 quarterback pressures, 2 passes defensed and 2 forced fumbles. He had a career-high 17 tackles and returned an interception 27 yards for a touchdown against Vanderbilt University. He contributed to his team winning the SEC championship and the 1991 Sugar Bowl against the University of Virginia.

In 1991, he transferred to the University of Mississippi and had to sit one year to comply with the NCAA transfer rules.

As a junior in 1992, he was a starter at linebacker, registering 100 tackles (second on the team), 10 sacks (led the team), 5 tackles for loss, 12 quarterback pressures, 5 passes defensed and one forced fumble.

As a senior in 1993, his 400-pound bench press ranked second on the squad. He collected 92 tackles, five sacks, 10 tackles for loss (second on the team), 16 quarterback pressures (led the team), two passes defensed, one forced fumble and 2 fumble recoveries. He had 15 tackles (3 for losses) and one sack against Vanderbilt University. He finished the season as one of the 10 semifinalists for the Butkus Award.

== Professional career ==
=== Dallas Cowboys ===
Dotson was selected by the Dallas Cowboys in the fourth round (131st overall) of the 1994 NFL draft. He was released during training camp.

=== Miami Dolphins ===
On September 7, 1994, he was signed by the Miami Dolphins to their practice squad. In 1995, he made the regular roster as a backup linebacker and special teams player, however, he didn't appear in a single game during the season.

In 1996, with the arrival of new head coach Jimmy Johnson, he was converted into a fullback but was released before the start of the season.

In 1997, he was re-signed and appeared in 10 games as a back-up to starter Stanley Pritchett, replacing him as a starter for two games because of a knee injury. He made his lone career pass reception for four yards, against the Tampa Bay Buccaneers. He also recovered one fumble that season. He wasn't very effective in a fullback role and was released on November 18, to make room for Roosevelt Potts.

=== Nashville Kats (AFL) ===
In 1999, Dotson joined the Nashville Kats of the Arena Football League where he played for two seasons as a linebacker and fullback. In his rookie season in the AFL, he recorded 10 tackles, one sack, one pass defensed and one kick return.

In 2000, he recorded seven tackles and one sack. He was waived on June 16.

== Personal life ==
From 2007 to 2014, Dotson was a volunteer coach for the White House High School Blue Devils, coaching the offensive line and linebackers.

Dotson owns a concrete business in White House, Tennessee where he also resides. He is married to his wife Glenda and have two kids, J.D. and Jada.Dotson is currently the head softball coach of the Tennessee Ballhawks, a 14u softball program.
