= Bracy Walker =

American football player (born 1970)

No. 40, 27, 26, 28
- Position: Safety

Personal information
- Born: October 28, 1970 (age 56); Portsmouth, Virginia, U.S.
- Listed height: 6 ft 0 in (1.83 m)
- Listed weight: 202 lb (92 kg)

Career information
- High school: Pine Forest (Fayetteville, North Carolina)
- College: North Carolina
- NFL draft: 1994: 4th round, 127th overall pick

Career history
- Kansas City Chiefs (1994); Cincinnati Bengals (1994-1996); Miami Dolphins (1997); Kansas City Chiefs (1998–2001); Detroit Lions (2002–2005)

Awards and highlights
- First-team All-American (1993); First-team All-ACC (1993); Second-team All-ACC (1992)

Career NFL statistics
- Tackles: 401
- Interceptions: 8
- Fumble recoveries: 7
- Stats at Pro Football Reference

Bracy Wardell Walker (born November 28, 1970) is an American former professional football player who was a safety in the National Football League (NFL). He played college football for the North Carolina Tar Heels. Walker was selected by the Kansas City Chiefs in the fourth round of the 1994 NFL draft. In his 12-year career that started in 1994, Walker played for the Chiefs, Cincinnati Bengals, Miami Dolphins, and Detroit Lions.

== College career ==
Walker played college football for the North Carolina Tar Heels where he was first-team All-American in his senior year. Bracey Walker graduated from Pine Forest High School in Fayetteville, NC in 1989.

== NFL career ==
Walker currently has the second longest return of a blocked field goal, making a 92-yard run for a touchdown in a 2004 game against the Chicago Bears. Walker was a backup for most of the 2005 season, starting the final four games of the regular season after starting safety Terrence Holt was injured.

== NFL career statistics ==
Legend
**Bold**	Career high

Year	Team	Games		Tackles				Interceptions				Fumbles			
Year	Team	GP	GS	Comb	Solo	Ast	Sck	Int	Yds	TD	Lng	FF	FR	Yds	TD
1994	KAN	2	0	0	0	0	0.0	0	0	0	0	0	0	0	0
1994	CIN	7	0	2	1	1	0.0	0	0	0	0	0	0	0	0
1995	CIN	14	14	**85**	**60**	**25**	0.0	**4**	**56**	0	23	**1**	**2**	**9**	0
1996	CIN	16	16	70	57	13	0.0	2	35	0	**35**	**1**	0	0	0
1997	MIA	12	0	2	2	0	0.0	0	0	0	0	0	1	0	0
1998	KAN	8	0	1	1	0	0.0	0	0	0	0	0	0	0	0
1999	KAN	16	1	15	14	1	0.0	0	0	0	0	0	0	0	0
2000	KAN	15	0	14	12	2	0.0	0	0	0	0	0	0	0	0
2001	KAN	15	0	6	6	0	0.0	0	0	0	0	0	1	0	0
2002	DET	14	1	53	39	14	**1.0**	0	0	0	0	0	0	0	0
2003	DET	16	1	38	35	3	0.0	0	0	0	0	**1**	1	0	0
2004	DET	16	16	78	56	22	**1.0**	1	0	0	0	0	**2**	2	0
2005	DET	16	4	37	26	11	0.0	1	22	0	22	0	0	0	0
Career		167	53	401	309	92	2.0	8	113	0	35	3	7	11	0
