= 1992 All-Atlantic Coast Conference football team =

American college football all-star team

The 1992 All-Atlantic Coast Conference football team consists of American football players chosen by various selectors for their All-Atlantic Coast Conference ("ACC") teams for the 1992 college football season. Selectors in 1992 included the Associated Press (AP).

== Offensive selections ==
=== Wide receivers ===
- Marcus Badgett, Maryland (AP-1)
- Todd Dixon, Wake Forest (AP-1)
- Tamarick Vanover, Florida St. (AP-2)
- Eddie Goines, NC State (AP-2)

=== Tackles ===
- Ben Coleman, Wake Forest (AP-1)
- Robert Stevenson, Florida St. (AP-1)
- Curtis Parker, North Carolina (AP-2)
- George Hegamin, NC State (AP-2)

=== Guards ===
- Stacy Seegars, Clemson (AP-1)
- Mike Gee, North Carolina (AP-1)
- Mark Dixon, Virginia (AP-2)
- Patrick McNeil, Florida St. (AP-2)

=== Centers ===
- Randall Parsons, North Carolina (AP-1)
- Robbie Baker, Florida St. (AP-2)

=== Tight ends ===
- John Henry Mills, Wake Forest (AP-1)
- Neal Auer, NC State (AP-2)

=== Quarterbacks ===
- Charlie Ward, Florida St. (AP-1)
- Terry Jordan, NC State (AP-2)

=== Running backs ===
- Natrone Means, North Carolina (AP-1)
- Anthony Barbour, NC State (AP-1)
- Terry Kirby, Virginia (AP-2)
- Randy Cuthbert, Duke (AP-2)

== Defensive selections ==
=== Defensive linemen ===
- Chris Slade, Virginia (AP-1)
- Coleman Rudolph, Georgia Tech (AP-1)
- Ricky Logo, NC State (AP-1)
- Michael McCrary, Wake Forest (AP-2)
- Brentson Buckner, Clemson (AP-2)
- Carl Reeves, NC State (AP-2)

=== Linebackers ===
- Marvin Jones, Florida St. (AP-1)
- Dave Merritt, NC State (AP-1)
- Derrick Brooks, Florida St. (AP-1)
- Tyler Lawrence, NC State (AP-1)
- Tommy Thigpen, North Carolina (AP-2)
- Mike Jarmolowich, Maryland (AP-2)
- Ashley Sheppard, Clemson (AP-2)
- Maurice Miller, Wake Forest (AP-2)

=== Defensive backs ===
- George Coghill, Wake Forest (AP-1)
- Corey Sawyer, Florida St. (AP-1)
- Mike Reid, NC State (AP-1)
- Sebastian Savage, NC State (AP-1)
- Robert O'Neal, Clemson (AP-2)
- Leon Fowler, Florida St. (AP-2)
- Bracy Walker, North Carolina (AP-2)
- Rondell Jones, North Carolina (AP-2)

== Special teams ==
=== Placekickers ===
- Scott Sisson, Georgia Tech (AP-1)
- Nelson Welch, Clemson (AP-2)

=== Punters ===
- Mike Thomas, North Carolina (AP-1)
- Tim Kilpatrick, NC State (AP-2)
- Tim Davis, Duke (AP-2)

== Key ==
AP = Associated Press

== See also ==
1992 College Football All-America Team
