= Stacy Seegars =

American football player (born 1972)

No. 79
- Position: Guard

Personal information
- Born: c. 1972 (age 53–54); Kershaw, South Carolina, U.S.
- Listed height: 6 ft 3 in (1.91 m)
- Listed weight: 320 lb (145 kg)

Career information
- College: Clemson
- NFL draft: 1994: undrafted

Career history
- Seattle Seahawks (1994)*
- * Offseason or practice squad member only

Awards and highlights
- Consensus All-American (1993); Second-team All-American (1992); 2× First-team All-ACC (1992, 1993)

Stacy Seegars (born c. 1972) is an American former college football player who was an offensive lineman for the Clemson Tigers. He was named a consensus All-American in 1993. Seegars was induced to the Clemson Athletics Hall of Fame in 2012.

Seegars was undrafted in 1994, but signed a free-agent contract with the Seattle Seahawks. He left the team for personal reasons a few days into training camp, and never played in the NFL.
