= Charlie Ward =

American basketball and football player (born 1970)

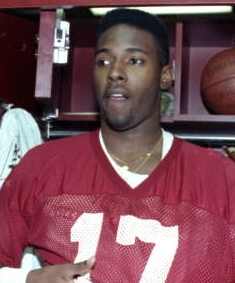
- Ward in 1991 with the Florida State football team

Florida A&M Rattlers
- Title: Head coach
- League: SWAC

Personal information
- Born: October 12, 1970 (age 56) Thomasville, Georgia, U.S.
- Listed height: 6 ft 2 in (1.88 m)
- Listed weight: 190 lb (86 kg)

Career information
- High school: Thomas County Central (Thomasville, Georgia)
- College: Florida State (1990–1994)
- NBA draft: 1994: 1st round, 26th overall pick
- Drafted by: New York Knicks
- Playing career: 1994–2005
- Position: Point guard
- Number: 21, 17

Career history

Playing
- 1994–2004: New York Knicks
- 2004: San Antonio Spurs
- 2004–2005: Houston Rockets

Coaching
- 2005–2007: Houston Rockets (assistant)
- 2018–2025: Florida HS
- 2025–present: Florida A&M

Career highlights
- Coach Wooden "Keys to Life" Award (2011); 2× ACC Male Athlete of the Year (1993, 1994)

Career NBA statistics
- Points: 3,947 (6.3 ppg)
- Rebounds: 1,648 (2.6 rpg)
- Assists: 2,539 (4.0 apg)
- Stats at NBA.com
- Stats at Basketball Reference

Other information
- Football career

No. 17
- Position: Quarterback

Career information
- College: Florida State (1989–1993)

Awards and highlights
- National champion (1993); Heisman Trophy (1993); Unanimous All-American (1993); Third-team All-American (1992); 2× ACC Male Athlete of the Year (1993, 1994); Florida Sports Hall of Fame (1992); Florida State Seminoles Jersey No. 17 honored
- College Football Hall of Fame (Class of 2006)

Charlie Ward Jr. (born October 12, 1970) is an American basketball coach, former professional basketball player, and former college football player who is the head coach of the Florida A&M Rattlers. Ward previously played as a point guard in the National Basketball Association (NBA) for 11 seasons, primarily with the New York Knicks. He played college basketball for the Florida State Seminoles, winning the ACC Male Athlete of the Year award twice. Ward also played college football as a quarterback with the Seminoles team, winning the Heisman Trophy in 1993 en route to a victory in the 1994 Orange Bowl.

After being projected as a mid-round pick in the National Football League (NFL), Ward chose to pursue a basketball career and was selected by the Knicks in the first round of the 1994 NBA draft. During his nine full seasons with the Knicks, he was a member of the team that made the 1999 NBA Finals. Ward was traded to the San Antonio Spurs during the 2003–04 season and spent his final year in 2005 with the Houston Rockets. Following his retirement as a player, Ward began a coaching career and has served as the head coach of the Rattlers since 2025. He was inducted to the College Football Hall of Fame in 2006.

== College football ==
Ward won the 1993 Heisman Trophy, Maxwell Award, and the Davey O'Brien Award as a quarterback for Florida State University. He subsequently led the Seminoles to their first-ever national championship when FSU defeated Nebraska 18–16 in the 1994 Orange Bowl. The Seminoles had suffered their only defeat of the season to a second-ranked Notre Dame team, but their path to the national championship was cleared a week later when the Irish were upset at home by Boston College. Ward holds the fourth-largest margin of victory in the history of Heisman trophy balloting, with a 1,622-point difference, fourth only to Joe Burrow's 1,846 point win in 2019, O. J. Simpson's 1,750-point win in 1968 and Troy Smith's 1,662-point win in 2006. He is also the only Heisman winner to play in the NBA. In 1993, Charlie Ward won the James E. Sullivan Award from the Amateur Athletic Union (AAU) as the most outstanding amateur athlete in the United States.

Season	Team	Passing								Rushing			
Season	Team	Cmp	Att	Pct	Yds	Avg	TD	Int	Rtg	Att	Yds	Avg	TD
1989	Florida State	0	5	0.0	0	0.0	0	1	-40.0	2	21	10.5	0
1990	Florida State	Redshirt											
1991	Florida State	5	9	55.6	68	7.6	0	0	119.0	5	25	5.0	0
1992	Florida State	204	365	55.9	2,647	7.3	22	17	127.4	100	504	5.0	6
1993	Florida State	264	380	69.5	3,032	8.0	27	4	157.8	65	339	5.2	4
Career		473	759	62.3	5,747	7.6	49	22	141.4	172	889	5.2	10

== College basketball ==
Ward also played basketball for four years at Florida State University (FSU). Former teammates included future NBA players Bob Sura, Doug Edwards, and Sam Cassell. His 1993 team made it to the Southeast Regional Final where they lost to Kentucky 106–81 with the winner advancing to the Final Four. Ward's 1992 team made the Sweet Sixteen. He made the game-winning shot in its Metro Conference Tournament Championship game win over Louisville in 1991. Ward still holds FSU basketball records for career steals at 236 and steals in one game at 9, and ranks sixth all-time in assists at 396. He played a shortened season his senior year, joining the basketball team just 15 days after winning the Heisman Trophy. He started 16 games at the point guard position that year, and averaged a college career high of 10.5 points and 4.9 assists for the season.

Year	Team	GP	GS	MPG	FG%	3P%	FT%	RPG	APG	SPG	BPG	PPG
1990–91	Florida State	30	—	23.8	.455	.313	.713	3.0	3.4	2.4	.3	8.0
1991–92	Florida State	28	22	30.0	.497	.458	.530	3.2	4.4	2.7	.2	7.2
1992–93	Florida State	17	14	32.8	.462	.320	.667	2.6	5.5	2.8	.3	7.8
1993–94	Florida State	16	16	35.9	.365	.253	.625	3.9	4.9	2.8	.1	10.5
Career		91	52	29.5	.441	.323	.636	3.1	4.4	2.6	.2	8.1

== Professional career ==
After graduating from Florida State University, Ward said that he was undecided between professional basketball and football, but also made clear that he would only consider the National Football League if he were selected in the first round of the 1994 NFL draft. Contemporary reporting said Ward and his family had been told that he projected as a mid-round NFL pick, and his size, along with uncertainty over whether he would instead choose the NBA, contributed to his falling out of the first round. The New York Knicks selected Ward with the 26th overall pick in the first round of the 1994 NBA draft, and he chose basketball. During his rookie year, Ward also declined an inquiry about becoming the backup quarterback to Joe Montana with the Kansas City Chiefs.

=== New York Knicks ===
Ward's first NBA season, 1994–95, was largely interrupted by a wrist injury; he appeared in only 10 games as the veteran Knicks remained anchored by Derek Harper, John Starks and Patrick Ewing. He became a more regular bench contributor in 1995–96, averaging 3.9 points and 2.1 assists in 62 games. After assistant coach Jeff Van Gundy replaced Don Nelson late that season, Ward's role continued to expand.

By 1996–97, Ward had become a regular part of the Knicks' backcourt rotation, appearing in 79 games with 21 starts and averaging 5.2 points and 4.1 assists for a 57-win team. In 1997–98, he emerged as New York's full-time starting point guard, starting all 82 games and posting 7.8 points, 5.7 assists, 1.8 steals and a .377 three-point percentage. That season he was selected for the NBA All-Star three-point competition, reaching the semifinals and finishing fourth. He also averaged 6.6 points, 6.0 assists and 2.0 steals in 10 playoff games in the Knicks' first-round series against the Miami Heat.

Ward remained the starter throughout the lockout-shortened 1998–99 season, again opening every game and averaging 7.6 points, 5.4 assists and 2.1 steals. He had one of the best playmaking games of his career on February 25, 1999, when he recorded 13 assists against the Minnesota Timberwolves. In the postseason, Ward started all 20 games as New York advanced from the eighth seed in the Eastern Conference to the 1999 NBA Finals, where the Knicks lost to the San Antonio Spurs in five games. Ward averaged 4.6 points, 3.8 assists and 1.8 steals during that playoff run.

In Game 5 of the 1997 Eastern Conference semifinals against the Miami Heat, Ward was thrown into the front row by P. J. Brown during a bench-clearing altercation. Brown was suspended for the rest of the series, while Ward and several Knicks teammates also received suspensions for their roles in the incident; New York, which had led the series 3–1, then lost Games 6 and 7 and was eliminated.

From 1999–2000 through 2000–01, Ward remained an important starter or heavy-minute rotation guard. On the 50-win 1999–2000 Knicks, he averaged 7.3 points, 4.2 assists and 1.3 steals while making 102 three-pointers at a .386 clip. In the 2000 playoffs, he averaged a career-best 9.4 points per game, shot .504 from the field and .396 from three-point range, and scored 13 points in Game 2 of the Eastern Conference semifinals at Miami. In 2000–01, he averaged 7.1 points and 4.5 assists as New York won 48 games and returned to the playoffs.

Ward's role declined somewhat as the Knicks reshaped their roster in the early 2000s, but he remained a useful ball-handler and defender. He averaged 5.2 points and 3.2 assists in 2001–02, then 7.2 points and 4.6 assists in 2002–03. In the first half of 2003–04, Ward was having one of his most efficient offensive seasons, averaging a career-high 8.7 points per game and shooting .428 from three-point range in 35 games with New York. Over his Knicks tenure, Ward became known for perimeter defense, unselfish play, steady ball distribution and three-point shooting rather than high-volume scoring. He finished his Knicks career fifth in franchise history in regular-season steals.

=== Final NBA seasons ===
On January 5, 2004, Ward was traded by the Knicks, along with Antonio McDyess and other assets, to the Phoenix Suns in the deal that brought Stephon Marbury and Penny Hardaway to New York. Phoenix waived Ward the next day in a salary-clearing move, and he soon signed with the San Antonio Spurs. Ward appeared in 36 regular-season games and five playoff games for San Antonio in the second half of the 2003–04 season.

In the summer of 2004, Ward signed with the Houston Rockets. Injuries limited him to 14 games in 2004–05, although he started 13 of them and averaged 5.4 points and 3.1 assists when available. After the season, Ward retired from the NBA.

Ward finished his NBA career with 630 regular-season games, 285 starts, 3,947 points, 2,539 assists and 744 steals, along with career averages of 6.3 points, 4.0 assists and 1.2 steals per game while shooting .364 from three-point range.

== Post retirement career ==
=== Coaching ===
Ward was an assistant coach for the NBA team, the Houston Rockets.

In June 2007, Ward was hired as an assistant coach for the varsity boys basketball team by Westbury Christian School in Houston, Texas. In November 2007, he accepted the job as head coach for the varsity football team at Westbury Christian School, stating that his desire is to help prepare young minds for Christ. In February 2014, it was announced that Ward accepted the head coaching position at Booker T. Washington High School in Pensacola, Florida, where his son Caleb would be attending and playing football. As of March 8, 2018, Ward is the Ambassador of Football for Florida State University. In March 2018, Ward became the head boys' basketball coach for Florida State University’s high school (FSUS or Florida High) in Tallahassee, Florida. The program improved since Ward's arrival.

Ward was hired to be the head coach at Florida A&M on April 16, 2025.

=== Other ===
Ward hosts a web series, Chalk Talk with Charlie Ward, where he discusses his thoughts on Florida State Seminole Football.

Charlie Ward made his acting debut, playing himself on the Netflix comedy series Family Reunion in the episode "Remember M'dear's Fifteen Minutes?" in 2020.

== Charitable work ==
Off the court, Ward became known for his extensive charitable work through groups like the Fellowship of Christian Athletes. In 2011, at the NCAA Final Four, Ward received the John Wooden Keys to Life award given by Athletes in Action Basketball for continued excellence and integrity on and off the court.

Ward established The aWard Foundation to enhance the lives of young people through sports based mentoring and educational programs.

== Career statistics ==
Legend
GP	Games played	GS	Games started	MPG	Minutes per game
FG%	Field goal percentage	3P%	3-point field goal percentage	FT%	Free throw percentage
RPG	Rebounds per game	APG	Assists per game	SPG	Steals per game
BPG	Blocks per game	PPG	Points per game	**Bold**	Career high
*	Led the league

=== NBA ===
Year	Team	GP	GS	MPG	FG%	3P%	FT%	RPG	APG	SPG	BPG	PPG
1994–95	New York	10	0	4.4	.211	.100	.700	.6	.4	.2	.0	1.6
1995–96	New York	62	1	12.7	.399	.333	.685	1.6	2.1	.9	.1	3.9
1996–97	New York	79	21	22.3	.395	.312	.76	2.8	4.1	1.1	.2	5.2
1997–98	New York	**82***	**82***	28.3	**.455**	.377	.805	3.3	**5.7**	1.8	**.5**	7.8
1998–99	New York	50*	50*	**31.1**	.404	.356	.705	**3.4**	5.4	**2.1**	.2	7.6
1999–00	New York	72	69	27.6	.423	.386	.828	3.2	4.2	1.3	.2	7.3
2000–01	New York	61	33	24.5	.416	.383	.800	2.6	4.5	1.1	.2	7.1
2001–02	New York	63	0	16.8	.373	.323	.810	2.0	3.2	1.1	.2	5.2
2002–03	New York	66	6	22.2	.399	.378	.774	2.7	4.6	1.2	.2	7.2
2003–04	New York	35	10	23.6	.442	**.428**	.762	2.7	4.9	1.3	.2	**8.7**
2003–04	San Antonio	36	0	11.8	.346	.368	.667	1.3	1.3	.5	.1	3.3
2004–05	Houston	14	13	25.7	.312	.314	**.846**	2.8	3.1	1.1	.0	5.4
Career		630	285	22.3	.408	.364	.771	2.6	4.0	1.2	.2	6.3

Year	Team	GP	GS	MPG	FG%	3P%	FT%	RPG	APG	SPG	BPG	PPG
1996	New York	7	0	13.1	.481	.250	.429	1.3	2.4	1.6	.0	4.6
1997	New York	9	0	20.2	.296	.111	.750	2.8	4.3	1.4	.0	2.2
1998	New York	10	10	26.1	.418	.429	.688	2.8	**6.0**	**2.0**	.2	6.6
1999	New York	**20**	**20**	24.7	.366	.321	.750	2.3	3.8	1.8	.2	4.6
2000	New York	16	16	**27.4**	.504	.396	.714	**4.3**	4.1	1.4	**.3**	**9.4**
2001	New York	5	0	17.2	.296	.250	**1.000**	1.4	1.4	.4	.0	5.0
2004	San Antonio	5	0	2.6	**.667**	**1.000**	–	.0	.2	.4	.0	2.2
Career		72	46	21.8	.422	.349	.710	2.5	3.7	1.5	.1	5.5

== Head coaching record ==
Record table
Season	Team	Overall	Conference	Standing	Postseason
Florida A&M Rattlers (Southwestern Athletic Conference) (2025–present)
2025–26	Florida A&M	15–16	11–7	T–2nd	
2026–27	Florida A&M	0–6	0–0		
Florida A&M:		15–22 (.405)	11–7 (.611)		
Total:		15–22 (.405)			

== Awards and honors ==
=== General ===
- 2× ACC Male Athlete of the Year (1993, 1994)

=== Basketball ===
- Coach Wooden "Keys to Life" Award (2011)

=== Football ===
- National champion (1993)
- Heisman Trophy (1993)
- Maxwell Award (1993)
- Walter Camp Award (1993)
- SN Player of the Year (1993)
- Johnny Unitas Golden Arm Award (1993)
- Quarterback of the Year (1993)
- Davey O'Brien Award (1993)
- James E. Sullivan Award (1993)
- Chic Harley Award (1993)
- Unanimous All-American (1993)
- Third-team All-American (1992)
- ACC Offensive Player of the Year (1993)
- 2× ACC Player of the Year (1992, 1993)
- 2× First-team All-ACC (1992, 1993)
- Florida Sports Hall of Fame (1992)
- Florida State Seminoles Jersey No. 17 honored

== Personal life ==
Ward and his wife Tonja have three children: Caleb, Hope, and Joshua.

In June 2018, while on a church mission trip to Ensenada, Mexico, Ward suffered a stroke. He has since made a full recovery. Ward switched to a vegan diet and began a more consistent workout regimen to improve his health and prevent another stroke in the future.

Ward is a member of Omega Psi Phi fraternity.

In 2001, Ward drew criticism after remarks he made about Jews during a Bible-study session were reported publicly. Ward said his comments had been taken out of context, later apologized, and the Anti-Defamation League said it accepted that apology.
