= Everett Lindsay =

American football player and coach (born 1970)

Brevard Tornados
- Title: Assistant head coach Offensive line coach

Personal information
- Born: September 18, 1970 (age 56); Burlington, Iowa, U.S.
- Listed height: 6 ft 5 in (1.96 m)
- Listed weight: 275 lb (125 kg)

Career information
- High school: Millbrook (Raleigh, North Carolina)
- College: Ole Miss
- NFL draft: 1993: 5th round, 133rd overall pick

Career history

Playing
- Minnesota Vikings (1993–1997); Barcelona Dragons (1997); Minnesota Vikings (1998); Baltimore Ravens (1999); Cleveland Browns (2000); Minnesota Vikings (2001–2003); Arizona Cardinals (2004)*
- * Offseason or practice squad member only

Coaching
- Arizona Cardinals (2004) Assistant offensive line coach; Arizona Cardinals (2005) Offensive line coach; Brevard (2017–2019) Offensive line coach; Brevard (2020–2021) Run game coordinator & offensive line coach; Brevard (2022–present) Assistant head coach, run game coordinator & offensive line coach

Awards and highlights
- Consensus All-American (1992); Jacobs Blocking Trophy (1992); First-team All-SEC (1992); Second-team All-SEC (1991); 2010 SEC Legends Class; Ole Miss Team of the Century

Career NFL statistics
- Games played: 136
- Games started: 63
- Fumble recoveries: 1
- Stats at Pro Football Reference

Everett Eric Lindsay (born September 18, 1970) is an American former professional football player who was a guard for 11 seasons in the National Football League (NFL). He played college football for the Ole Miss Rebels, earning consensus All-American recognition in 1992. He played professionally for the Minnesota Vikings, Baltimore Ravens and Cleveland Browns of the NFL.

== Early life ==
Lindsay was born in Burlington, Iowa, and raised in Raleigh, North Carolina. He attended Millbrook High School in Raleigh, where he played for the Millbrook Wildcats high school football team.

== College career ==
While attending the University of Mississippi, he played for the Ole Miss Rebels football team from 1989 to 1992. He was initially a walk-on, but later earned an athletic scholarship and anchored the offensive line under then head coach Billy Brewer. Lindsay was a first-team All-Southeastern Conference (SEC) selection in 1991 and 1992, and a consensus first-team All-American in 1992.

== Professional career ==
The Minnesota Vikings selected Lindsay in the fifth round (133rd overall pick) of the 1993 NFL draft. He played for the Vikings from 1993 to 1998. He played for the Baltimore Ravens in 1999 and the Cleveland Browns in 2000. He returned to the Vikings for his final three seasons, from 2001 to 2003. During his eleven NFL seasons, he played in 136 regular season games, started 63 of them, including 32 straight starts for the Ravens and Browns in 1998 and 1999.
