= Robert L. Barker =

American politician

Personal details
- Born: 1933 or 1934 Harnett County, North Carolina, U.S.
- Died: June 22, 2010 Greenville, North Carolina, U.S.
- Spouse: Kaye Hollowell
- Profession: Politician, Real Estate Appraiser

Robert L. Barker (1933/1934 – June 22, 2010) was an American politician. He was a state senator in North Carolina, representing Wake, Harnett and Lee Counties. Barker was born in Harnett County and grew up in Raleigh, attending Millbrook High School. He attended North Carolina State University.

Barker served as chair of the Senate Committee on Insurance and the Senate Appropriations Subcommittee on Human Resources in the North Carolina General Assembly. He also co-chaired the House–Senate Joint Committee on Medical Malpractice during the malpractice issues of the 1970s. Senator Barker also participated in the planning the state government complex in downtown Raleigh.

Barker played a role in the establishment of a medical school at East Carolina University and was active in the Boys and Girls Club of Raleigh. Barker was a real estate appraiser by trade and owned Bob Barker & Associates Inc.
