= 1993 All-SEC football team =

American college football all-star team

The 1993 All-SEC football team consists of American football players selected to the All-Southeastern Conference (SEC) chosen by various selectors for the 1993 college football season.

The Florida Gators won the conference, beat the Alabama Crimson Tide 28 to 13 in the SEC Championship game. The Gators then defeated the West Virginia Mountaineers 41 to 7 in the Sugar Bowl.

Tennessee quarterback Heath Shuler was voted SEC Player of the Year.

== Offensive selections ==
=== Quarterbacks ===
- Heath Shuler, Tennessee (AP-1, Coaches-1)
- Eric Zeier, Georgia (AP-2, Coaches-2)

=== Running backs ===
- Errict Rhett, Florida (AP-1, Coaches-1)
- James Bostic, Auburn (AP-1, Coaches-1)
- Charlie Garner, Tennessee (AP-2, Coaches-2)
- Moe Williams, Kentucky (AP-2)
- Brandon Bennett, South Carolina (Coaches-2)

=== Wide receivers ===
- David Palmer, Alabama (AP-1, Coaches-1)
- Brice Hunter, Georgia (AP-1, Coaches-2)
- Cory Fleming, Tennessee (AP-2, Coaches-1)
- Jack Jackson, Florida (AP-2, Coaches-2)

=== Centers ===
- Tobie Sheils, Alabama (AP-1, Coaches-1)
- Kevin Mawae, LSU (AP-2, Coaches-2)

=== Guards ===
- Jeff Smith, Tennessee (AP-1, Coaches-1)
- Jim Watson, Florida (AP-1)
- Ryan Bell, Vanderbilt (AP-2, Coaches-2)
- Anthony Redmon, Auburn (AP-2, Coaches-2)

=== Tackles ===
- Wayne Gandy, Auburn (AP-1, Coaches-1)
- Reggie Green, Florida (AP-1, Coaches-1)
- Bernard Williams, Georgia (AP-2, Coaches-1)
- Jason Odom, Florida (AP-2, Coaches-2)
- Isaac Davis, Arkansas (Coaches-2)

=== Tight ends ===
- Shannon Mitchell, Georgia (AP-1, Coaches-1)
- Kirk Botkin, Arkansas (AP-2)
- Harold Bishop, LSU (Coaches-2)

== Defensive selections ==
=== Ends ===
- Henry Ford, Arkansas (AP-1, Coaches-1)
- Jeremy Nunley, Alabama (AP-1, Coaches-1)
- James Wilson, Tennessee (AP-2, Coaches-2)
- Alan Young, Vanderbilt (AP-2, Coaches-2)

=== Tackles ===
- William Gaines, Florida (AP-1, Coaches-1)
- Arleye Gibson, Miss. St. (AP-1)
- James Gregory, Alabama (AP-2)
- Tim Bowens, Ole Miss (AP-2)
- Stacy Evans, South Carolina (Coaches-2)

=== Linebackers ===
- DeWayne Dotson, Ole Miss (AP-1, Coaches-1)
- Marty Moore, Kentucky (AP-1, Coaches-1)
- Cassius Ware, Ole Miss (AP-1, Coaches-2)
- Mitch Davis, Georgia (AP-1, Coaches-2)
- Ernest Dixon, South Carolina (AP-2, Coaches-1)
- Lemanski Hall, Alabama (AP-2, Coaches-1)
- Randall Godfrey, Georgia (Coaches-1)
- Abdul Jackson, Ole Miss (AP-2, Coaches-2)
- Ben Talley, Tennessee (AP-2)
- Juan Long, Miss. St. (Coaches-2)

=== Cornerbacks ===
- Antonio Langham, Alabama (AP-1, Coaches-1)
- Alundis Brice, Ole Miss (AP-1, Coaches-2)
- Calvin Jackson, Auburn (AP-1, Coaches-2)
- Johnny Dixon, Ole Miss (AP-2, Coaches-1)
- Orlando Watters, Arkansas (Coaches-1)
- Anthony Marshall, LSU (AP-2)

=== Safeties ===
- Marcus Jenkins, Kentucky (AP-2, Coaches-1)
- Jason Parker, Tennessee (AP-2, Coaches-2)
- Chris Shelling, Auburn (Coaches-2)
- Walter Davis, Miss. St. (Coaches-2)

== Special teams ==
=== Kicker ===
- John Becksvoort, Tennessee (AP-1, Coaches-2)
- Michael Proctor, Alabama (AP-2, Coaches-1)

=== Punter ===
- Terry Daniel, Auburn (AP-1, Coaches-1)
- Shayne Edge, Florida (AP-2, Coaches-2)

== Key ==
AP = Associated Press

Coaches = selected by the SEC coaches The 1993 coaches All-SEC team was the first to have a second team selection.

Bold = Consensus first-team selection by both Coaches and AP

== See also ==
- 1993 College Football All-America Team
