= Errict Rhett =

American football player (born 1970)

No. 32, 23, 33
- Position: Running back

Personal information
- Born: December 11, 1970 (age 55); Pembroke Pines, Florida, U.S.
- Listed height: 5 ft 11 in (1.80 m)
- Listed weight: 210 lb (95 kg)

Career information
- High school: McArthur (Hollywood, Florida)
- College: Florida
- NFL draft: 1994: 2nd round, 34th overall pick

Career history
- Tampa Bay Buccaneers (1994–1997); Baltimore Ravens (1998–1999); Cleveland Browns (2000)

Awards and highlights
- PFWA All-Rookie Team (1994); First-team All-American (1993); 2× First-team All-SEC (1991, 1993); Second-team All-SEC (1992); Florida–Georgia Hall of Fame; University of Florida Athletic Hall of Fame

Career NFL statistics
- Rushing yards: 4,143
- Rushing average: 3.5
- Receptions: 89
- Receiving yards: 552
- Total touchdowns: 32
- Stats at Pro Football Reference

Errict Undra Rhett (born December 11, 1970) is an American former professional football player who was a running back in the National Football League (NFL) for seven seasons during the 1990s and early 2000s. Rhett played college football for the Florida Gators, and was recognized as a first-team All-American. A second-round pick in the 1994 NFL draft, he played professionally for the Tampa Bay Buccaneers, Baltimore Ravens and Cleveland Browns of the NFL.

== Early life ==
Rhett was born in Pembroke Pines, Florida in 1970. He attended McArthur High School in Hollywood, Florida, where he was a star high school football player for the McArthur Mustangs. He also was a two-time state wrestling champion in the 185-pound and 220-pound weight class for the McArthur Mustangs wrestling team. At the 1988 Wrestling State Championship, Rhett did not meet the qualifications to wrestle at the 220lbs weight class because he only weighed 173lbs. In order to wrestle 220lbs, all wrestlers must weigh a minimum of 185lbs. Rhett sprinted across the street to a 7-Eleven, only to return 1:30 minutes later and stepped on the scale weighing 186lbs. Rhett went on to capture his 1st State Championship. When the media asked Rhett how did he gain that much weight in that short period of time, Rhett simply said " What the mind can conceive the body will achieve".

== College career ==
Rhett accepted an athletic scholarship to attend the University of Florida in Gainesville, Florida, and played tailback for coach Steve Spurrier's Florida Gators football team from 1990 to 1993. Rhett broke Gator alumnus Emmitt Smith's former Gators career rushing record, finishing with 4,163 yards and thirty-four touchdowns, 153 receptions, 1,230 yards receiving and two touchdown receptions, and leading the Gators in rushing for all four seasons of his college career. Memorably, he rushed for 193 yards against the Kentucky Wildcats in 1992, and for 196 yards against the Auburn Tigers in 1993. Aided by his consistent running game, the Gators won the Southeastern Conference (SEC) championship in 1991 and again in 1993. As a senior team captain, Rhett was named most valuable player (MVP) of the 1994 Sugar Bowl, rushing for 105 yards and three touchdowns in the Gators' 41–7 victory over the West Virginia Mountaineers. He was a first-team All-SEC selection in 1991 and 1993, a first-team All-American in 1993, and was chosen by his teammates as the Gators' most valuable player in 1993.

During his time at Florida, Rhett was initiated as a brother of Omega Psi Phi fraternity. He graduated from Florida with a bachelor's degree in 1995, and was later inducted into the University of Florida Athletic Hall of Fame as a "Gator Great" in 2005. The sports editors of The Gainesville Sun ranked him as No. 34 among the 100 all-time greatest Gators of the first 100 seasons of Florida football in 2006.

== Professional career ==
Rhett was chosen by the Tampa Bay Buccaneers in the second round (thirty-fourth pick overall) in the 1994 NFL Draft. He played seven professional seasons from 1994 to 2000. During his rookie season with Tampa Bay, he rushed for 1,011 yards and seven touchdowns. Rhett had a career year the following season when he rushed for 1,207 yards and eleven touchdowns. He was involved in a contract hold-out before the 1996 season, but still led the Buccaneers in rushing despite appearing in just nine games. Rhett played four more years in the NFL, but he never matched the numbers that he produced during his first two seasons. His best post-Tampa Bay season came in 1999 when he rushed for 852 yards for the Baltimore Ravens. Rhett's career ended when the Cleveland Browns waived him immediately before the start of the 2001 season.

During his seven NFL seasons, Rhett rushed for 4,143 yards and twenty-nine touchdowns; he also had eighty-nine receptions for 552 yards and three touchdowns.

== NFL career statistics ==
Legend
**Bold**	Career high

Year	Team	Games		Rushing					Receiving				
Year	Team	GP	GS	Att	Yds	Avg	Lng	TD	Rec	Yds	Avg	Lng	TD
1994	TAM	16	8	284	1,011	3.6	27	7	22	119	5.4	12	0
1995	TAM	16	16	**332**	**1,207**	3.6	21	**11**	14	110	**7.9**	18	0
1996	TAM	9	7	176	539	3.1	35	3	4	11	2.8	5	1
1997	TAM	11	0	31	96	3.1	21	3	0	0	0.0	0	0
1998	BAL	13	2	44	180	**4.1**	46	0	11	65	5.9	16	0
1999	BAL	16	10	236	852	3.6	**52**	5	**24**	**169**	7.0	**20**	**2**
2000	CLE	5	4	71	258	3.6	42	0	14	78	5.6	16	0
Career		86	47	1,174	4,143	3.5	52	29	89	552	6.2	20	3

== Life after football ==
Rhett is the father of three children: son Errict Jr., and daughters Morgan and Amaurri. All three are actively involved in sports; he coaches his son's Optimist league junior football team and regularly attends his daughters' track meets.

When his playing career ended after the 2000 NFL season, Rhett returned to South Florida, where he grew up. Today, he is the chief executive officer of Errict Rhett Custom Homes and the Errict Rhett Foundation. Rhett's foundation emphasizes charitable activities that benefit underprivileged children, including an after-school support program, college scholarships, and a mentoring program.

Outside the main entrance of Spurrier's Gridiron Grille stand "Spurrier's Gator Greats," honoring some of the most distinguished players in Florida Football history. In 2021, Rhett was honored as one of Spurrier's Gator Greats, receiving a permanent cement plaque commemorating his accomplishments.

== See also ==
- History of the Tampa Bay Buccaneers
- List of Florida Gators football All-Americans
- List of Florida Gators in the NFL draft
- List of Omega Psi Phi brothers
- List of University of Florida alumni
- List of University of Florida Athletic Hall of Fame members
