= Aaron Taylor (American football, born 1972) =

American football player (born 1972)

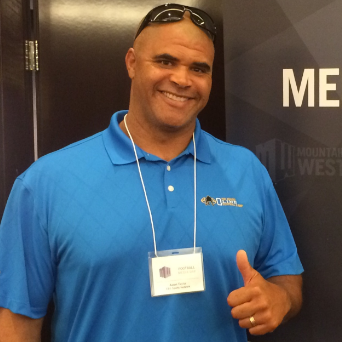
- Taylor at 2016 Mountain West Media Days

No. 73
- Position: Guard

Personal information
- Born: November 14, 1972 (age 53); San Francisco, California, U.S.
- Listed height: 6 ft 4 in (1.93 m)
- Listed weight: 305 lb (138 kg)

Career information
- High school: De La Salle (Concord, California)
- College: Notre Dame
- NFL draft: 1994: 1st round, 16th overall pick

Career history
- Green Bay Packers (1994–1997); San Diego Chargers (1998–1999)

Awards and highlights
- Super Bowl champion (XXXI); Unanimous All-American (1993); Consensus All-American (1992); Lombardi Award (1993); Jim Parker Award (1993)

Career NFL statistics
- Games played: 75
- Games started: 75
- Fumble recoveries: 4
- Stats at Pro Football Reference
- College Football Hall of Fame

Aaron Matthew Taylor (born November 14, 1972) is an American former professional football player who was a guard for six seasons in the National Football League (NFL). He played college football for the Notre Dame Fighting Irish and was a two-time All-American. A first-round pick in the 1994 NFL draft, he played professionally for the Green Bay Packers and the San Diego Chargers of the NFL. Taylor works as a college football analyst and television sportscaster. He is the Founder of the Joe Moore Award for the most outstanding offensive line unit in college football - the only major college football award going to a group versus an individual. Taylor is a speaker on teamwork and performance at summits, events, corporate retreats, universities. In 2021, Taylor was inducted into the College Football Hall of Fame

== Early life ==
Taylor was born in San Francisco, California. He graduated from De La Salle High School in Concord, California, where he played high school football for the De La Salle Spartans.

== College career ==
Taylor attended the University of Notre Dame, and played offensive tackle for the Fighting Irish from 1990 to 1993. He was a consensus first-team All-American in 1992 and 1993 and won the Lombardi Award in 1993. Taylor was also a senior team captain and an Outland Trophy finalist in 1993.

== Professional career ==
Taylor was selected in the first round (16th pick overall) of the 1994 NFL Draft by the Green Bay Packers. He played for the Packers from 1994 to 1997. Taylor's promising career was repeatedly interrupted by knee injuries, but he won a starting job at guard and played in two Super Bowls with the Packers, including their win in Super Bowl XXXI. After signing a large contract to play with the San Diego Chargers in 1998, Taylor continued to be plagued by injuries, leading to his retirement from the NFL after the 1999 season.

== Post-playing career ==
Taylor works as a college football analyst for CBS Sports Network. He previously worked as an analyst for ABC Sports, and as co-host of the network's college football coverage with John Saunders and Craig James. Taylor provides color commentary for CBSSN's coverage of the World's Strongest Man competition. He is married to Bulgarian Olympic beach volleyball player Lina Yanchulova, and has two sons and a daughter.
