= Jeff Smith (offensive lineman) =

American football player (born 1973)

No. 76, 65, 73, 61
- Positions: Center, guard

Personal information
- Born: May 25, 1973 (age 53); Decatur, Tennessee, U.S.
- Listed height: 6 ft 3 in (1.91 m)
- Listed weight: 320 lb (145 kg)

Career information
- High school: Meigs County (Decatur)
- College: Tennessee
- NFL draft: 1996: 7th round, 241st overall pick

Career history
- Kansas City Chiefs (1996–1999); → Scottish Claymores (1997); Jacksonville Jaguars (2000–2001); Tennessee Titans (2002)*; Pittsburgh Steelers (2002)
- * Offseason or practice squad member only

Awards and highlights
- First-team All-American (1994); Third-team All-American (1993); 2× First-team All-SEC (1993, 1995); Second-team All-SEC (1994)

Career NFL statistics
- Games played: 59
- Games started: 33
- Stats at Pro Football Reference

Jeffery Lee Smith (born May 25, 1973) is an American former professional football player who was an offensive lineman in the National Football League (NFL). He played college football for the Tennessee Volunteers and was selected in the seventh round of the 1996 NFL draft. He played in the NFL for the Kansas City Chiefs (1996–1999), Jacksonville Jaguars (2000–2001), and Pittsburgh Steelers (2002).
