= William Gaines (American football) =

American football player (born 1971)

No. 93, 95, 96
- Position: Defensive tackle

Personal information
- Born: June 20, 1971 (age 55); Jackson, Mississippi, U.S.
- Listed height: 6 ft 5 in (1.96 m)
- Listed weight: 280 lb (127 kg)

Career information
- High school: Lanier (Jackson)
- College: Florida
- NFL draft: 1994: 5th round, 147th overall pick

Career history
- Miami Dolphins (1994); Washington Redskins (1995–1997); Nashville Kats (1999–2001); Georgia Force (2002); Detroit Fury (2003); Orlando Predators (2004)

Awards and highlights
- Third-team All-American (1993); First-team All-SEC (1993)

Career NFL statistics
- Tackles: 72
- Sacks: 2
- Forced fumbles: 72
- Stats at Pro Football Reference

Career AFL statistics
- Tackles: 27
- Sacks: 2.5
- Passes defended: 12
- Stats at ArenaFan.com

William Albert Gaines (born June 20, 1971) is an American former professional football player who was a defensive lineman for four seasons in the National Football League (NFL) during the 1990s. Gaines played college football for the Florida Gators, and thereafter, he played in the NFL for the Washington Redskins and Miami Dolphins.

== Early life ==
Gaines was born in Jackson, Mississippi, in 1971. He attended Lanier High School in Jackson, and played high school football for the Lanier Bulldogs.

== College career ==
Gaines received an athletic scholarship to attend the University of Florida in Gainesville, where he played for coach Steve Spurrier's Florida Gators football team from 1990 to 1993. He was a member of the Gators teams that won Southeastern Conference (SEC) championships in 1991 and 1993. As a senior team captain in 1993, Gaines was a first-team All-SEC selection, and the recipient of the Gators' Fergie Ferguson Award recognizing the "senior football player who displays outstanding leadership, character and courage."

== Professional career ==
The Miami Dolphins drafted Gaines in the fifth round (147th pick overall) of the 1994 NFL draft. He played for the Dolphins for a single season in 1994. He played three seasons for the Washington Redskins from 1995 to 1997. In his four-season NFL career, Gaines started twenty-four of fifty-two NFL games in which he played, and recorded two quarterback sacks, one forced fumble and sixty tackles.

== See also ==
- Florida Gators football, 1990–99
- List of Florida Gators football All-Americans
- List of Florida Gators in the NFL draft
- List of Miami Dolphins players
- List of Washington Redskins players
