= Mark Dixon (gridiron football) =

American gridiron football player (born 1970)

No. 68, 64, 63
- Position: Guard

Personal information
- Born: November 26, 1970 (age 55); Charlottesville, Virginia, U.S.
- Listed height: 6 ft 4 in (1.93 m)
- Listed weight: 295 lb (134 kg)

Career information
- High school: Ragsdale (Jamestown, North Carolina)
- College: Virginia (1990–1993)
- NFL draft: 1994: undrafted

Career history
- Philadelphia Eagles (1994)*; Frankfurt Galaxy (1995); Atlanta Falcons (1995)*; Baltimore Stallions (1995); Montreal Alouettes (1996–1997); Miami Dolphins (1998–2003)
- * Offseason or practice squad member only

Awards and highlights
- World Bowl champion (1995); Grey Cup champion (1995); Consensus All-American (1993); First-team All-ACC (1993); Second-team All-ACC (1992); Virginia Cavaliers Jersey No. 66 retired

Career NFL statistics
- Games played: 62
- Games started: 60
- Fumble recoveries: 2
- Stats at Pro Football Reference

Mark Keller Dixon (born November 26, 1970) is an American former professional football player who was an offensive guard in the National Football League (NFL) and Canadian Football League (CFL)) during the late 1990s and early 2000s. He played college football for the Virginia Cavaliers, earning consensus All-American honors in 1993. He began his professional career playing in NFL Europe, then earned starting positions with the Baltimore Stallions and Montreal Alouettes of the CFL, and the Miami Dolphins of the NFL.

== Early life ==
Dixon was born in Charlottesville, Virginia. He attended Lucy C. Ragsdale High School in Jamestown, North Carolina, where he was a star high school football and basketball player for the Ragsdale Flying Tigers.

== College career ==
Dixon accepted an athletic scholarship to attend the University of Virginia, and played for coach George Welsh's Virginia Cavaliers football team from 1990 to 1993. As a senior offensive lineman for the Cavaliers in 1993, he was recognized for his achievements and under consensus first-team All-American.

== Professional career ==
Because of a series of injuries and related surgeries, Dixon was not selected in the 1994 NFL draft. He was signed by the NFL's Philadelphia Eagles as an undrafted free agent, but was released by the Eagles before the start of the 1994 season. He played as a member of the Frankfurt Galaxy of NFL Europe in the spring of 1995, and subsequently earned starting positions with the CFL's Baltimore Stallions in 1995 and the Montreal Alouettes in 1996 and 1997. Attracted to the "best player plays" philosophy of Miami Dolphins head coach Jimmy Johnson, he signed with the Dolphins as a 27-year-old NFL rookie. Dixon earned a starting position on the Dolphins' offensive line, and played in 62 regular season games for the Dolphins, and started in 60 of them.

== Post-playing career ==
Dixon is the former head coach of the Galax Maroon Tide football team of Galax High School in Galax, Virginia. In 2015, Dixon coached Galax to their first-ever state championship in football. In 2017 Dixon resigned from Galax as head coach to pursue other opportunities. He then returned the next month to coach the Maroon Tide again. Dixon resigned from Galax again in 2020 and took the head coaching job at Pulaski County High School (Virginia) in Dublin
