= Terry Daniel =

American football player

Profile
- Position: Punter

Career information
- College: Auburn (1992–1994)

Awards and highlights
- Consensus All-American (1993); 2× First-team All-SEC (1993, 1994); Second-team All-SEC (1992)

Terry Daniel is an American former college football punter who played for the Auburn Tigers. He was a consensus All-American in 1993.

== Career ==
Daniel played college football for the Auburn Tigers of Auburn University. He punted 65 times for 2,771 yards and a 42.6 yard average in 1992, earning Associated Press (AP) second-team All-SEC honors. He was named a consensus All-American in 1993 after punting 51 times for 2,392 yards and a 46.9 average. Mississippi State Bulldogs coach Jackie Sherrill accused Daniel of filling footballs with helium in October 1993. He was cleared of any wrongdoing. In 1994, Daniel recorded 53 punts for 2,358 yards and a 44.5 average, garnering AP first-team All-SEC recognition for the second consecutive season.

Daniel went undrafted in the 1995 NFL draft. Despite being a consensus All-American, Daniel was not even signed as an undrafted free agent by any NFL team, with Daniel stating "I don't know what to think about it. I heard San Francisco signed some punter I've never heard of. Jacksonville signed one, Miami signed one. I was like, "Who are these people?" The Town Talk speculated that NFL teams may have been worried about a herniated disc in Daniel's back, although he did not miss any games at Auburn due to the injury. Concerns may also have been raised about his weight, which was as high as 239 pounds, and a poor showing at the NFL Combine.
