= Brentson Buckner =

American football player and coach (born 1971)

Profile
- Position: Defensive line coach

Personal information
- Born: September 30, 1971 (age 55); Columbus, Georgia, U.S.
- Listed height: 6 ft 2 in (1.88 m)
- Listed weight: 305 lb (138 kg)

Career information
- High school: Carver (Columbus)
- College: Clemson
- NFL draft: 1994: 2nd round, 50th overall pick

Career history

Playing
- Pittsburgh Steelers (1994–1996); Kansas City Chiefs (1997)*; Cincinnati Bengals (1997); San Francisco 49ers (1998–2000); Carolina Panthers (2001–2005)
- * Offseason or practice squad member only

Coaching
- Northside Christian Academy (NC) (2008–2009) Head coach; Pittsburgh Steelers (2010–2012) Coaching intern; Arizona Cardinals (2013–2017) Defensive line coach; Tampa Bay Buccaneers (2018) Defensive line coach; Oakland Raiders (2019) Defensive line coach; Arizona Cardinals (2020–2021) Defensive line coach; Jacksonville Jaguars (2022–2023) Defensive line coach

Awards and highlights
- First-team All-ACC (1993); Second-team All-ACC (1992)

Career NFL statistics
- Tackles: 430
- Sacks: 31.0
- Interceptions: 2
- Stats at Pro Football Reference
- Coaching profile at Pro Football Reference

Brentson André Buckner (born September 30, 1971) is an American professional football coach and former defensive tackle. He previously served as an assistant coach for the Arizona Cardinals, Oakland Raiders, Tampa Bay Buccaneers, Pittsburgh Steelers, and Jacksonville Jaguars.

== Playing career ==
=== College career ===
Buckner played college football at Clemson University, and was a first-team All-ACC selection in his senior year. In addition to ranking fourth all-time in school history with 46 tackles for a loss, he also set a school record with a 1,220 pound lift on a leg sled.

=== National Football League ===
Pre-draft measurables
Height	Weight	Arm length	Hand span	40-yard dash	10-yard split	20-yard split	20-yard shuttle	Vertical jump	Broad jump	Bench press
6 ft 2 in (1.88 m)	300 lb (136 kg)	33 1/2 in (0.85 m)	9 5/8 in (0.24 m)	4.81 s	1.71 s	2.88 s	4.69 s	29.5 in (0.75 m)	9 ft 8 in (2.95 m)	33 reps

==== Pittsburgh Steelers ====
Buckner was selected in the second round (50th overall) of the 1994 NFL draft by the Pittsburgh Steelers. After missing the first three games of the season, he played in the last 13, and started both playoff games. During one game against the Buffalo Bills, he blocked a field goal. The following season, he was a regular starter for the Steelers, and was an integral part of the defense that led them to Super Bowl XXX against the Dallas Cowboys.

==== Cincinnati Bengals ====
In 1997, Buckner was traded to the Kansas City Chiefs during the offseason. He was picked up by the Cincinnati Bengals before the 1997 NFL season. He missed two games that season with an injury suffered against the Steelers, his former team.

==== San Francisco 49ers ====
In 1998, Buckner signed with the San Francisco 49ers. He notched his third career blocked field goal against the team he would later play for, the Carolina Panthers. He played with the Niners for three seasons.

==== Carolina Panthers ====
In 2001, Buckner signed with the Carolina Panthers, pairing up with Julius Peppers, Mike Rucker and Kris Jenkins to form what many experts called the most dominating front four defensive line in football. The four led the Panthers defense to Super Bowl XXXVIII against the New England Patriots.

On March 1, 2006, Buckner was released by the Panthers.

=== Post-retirement ===
After retirement, Buckner hosted a midday show on WFNZ in Charlotte, with former NFL Offensive lineman Frank Garcia. The Frank and Buck Show aired weekdays from 11am-3pm. He has also been seen on the NFL Network and ESPN as an NFL analyst.

== Coaching career ==
=== Northside Christian Academy ===
In 2008, Buckner was hired as the head coach of the Northside Christian Academy football team in Charlotte, North Carolina along with former NFL players, Myron Bell, Mo Collins, and Omari Jordan who were his assistant coaches.

=== Pittsburgh Steelers ===
In 2010, Buckner was hired by the Pittsburgh Steelers as an intern and he would spend three seasons with the team.

=== Arizona Cardinals (first stint) ===
On February 5, 2013, Buckner was hired by the Arizona Cardinals as their defensive line coach under head coach Bruce Arians.

=== Tampa Bay Buccaneers ===
On February 19, 2018, Buckner was hired by the Tampa Bay Buccaneers as their defensive line coach.

=== Oakland Raiders ===
On January 12, 2019, Buckner was hired by the Oakland Raiders as their defensive line coach, following the Buccaneers' hiring of head coach Bruce Arians. On January 14, 2020, Buckner was fired after one year with the team.

=== Arizona Cardinals (second stint) ===
On February 5, 2020, Buckner was hired by the Arizona Cardinals, returning to be their defensive line coach under head coach Kliff Kingsbury.

=== Jacksonville Jaguars ===
On February 17, 2022, Buckner was hired by the Jacksonville Jaguars as their defensive line coach under head coach Doug Pederson. He was fired from this role on January 8, 2024.

== Personal life ==
Buckner and his wife, Denise, have two daughters, Nia and Nya and a son, Brandon. He also has an older son, Brentson Jr.
