= 1996 Washington Huskies football team =

American college football season

1996 Washington Huskies football

Holiday Bowl, L 21–33 vs. Colorado
- Conference: Pacific-10 Conference

Ranking
- Coaches: No. 15
- AP: No. 16
- Record: 9–3 (7–1 Pac-10)
- Head coach: Jim Lambright (4th season)
- Offensive coordinator: Scott Linehan (1st season)
- Defensive coordinator: Randy Hart (2nd season)
- MVP: Corey Dillon
- Captains: John Fiala; Ink Aleaga; Bob Sapp; Dave Janoski
- Home stadium: Husky Stadium

1996 Pacific-10 Conference football standings
	Conf.			Overall
Team	W		L	W		L
No. 4 Arizona State $	8	–	0	11	–	1
No. 16 Washington	7	–	1	9	–	3
Stanford	5	–	3	7	–	5
UCLA	4	–	4	5	–	6
Oregon	3	–	5	6	–	5
California	3	–	5	6	–	6
USC	3	–	5	6	–	6
Arizona	3	–	5	5	–	6
Washington State	3	–	5	5	–	6
Oregon State	1	–	7	2	–	9
$ – Conference champion; Rankings from AP Poll

The 1996 Washington Huskies football team was an American football team that represented the University of Washington during the 1996 NCAA Division I-A football season. In its fourth season under head coach Jim Lambright, the team compiled a 9–3 record, finished second in the Pacific-10 Conference, and outscored opponents 391 to 254. Running back Corey Dillon was selected as the team's most valuable player. Seniors Ink Aleaga, John Fiala, Dave Janoski, and Bob Sapp were the team captains.

In his only season at Washington, Seattle native Dillon set the team all-time single-season records for rushing yards (1,695 yards) and touchdowns scored (24). In the first quarter against San Jose State in mid-November, he rushed for 222 yards with two touchdowns, then went 83 yards on a pass for a third touchdown, setting NCAA records for both rushing yards and all-purpose yards (305) in one quarter. Dillon did not re-enter the non-conference game as the Huskies were comfortably ahead 25–0 by the end of the first quarter on a cold and rainy afternoon; the Dawgs led 43–3 at the half and won 53–10. For the third time, he was named the Pac-10 offensive player of the week, and was a third team All-American.

== Schedule ==
Date	Time	Opponent	Rank	Site	TV	Result	Attendance
September 7	7:00 p.m.	at No. 20 Arizona State		Sun Devil Stadium; Tempe, AZ	FSN	L 42–45	73,379
September 14	12:30 p.m.	No. 14 BYU*		Husky Stadium; Seattle, WA	ABC	W 29–17	71,165
September 21	12:30 p.m.	Arizona	No. 24	Husky Stadium; Seattle, WA	ABC	W 31–17	73,414
October 5	3:30 p.m.	Stanford	No. 18	Husky Stadium; Seattle, WA	FSN	W 27–6	71,488
October 12	11:30 a.m.	at No. 11 Notre Dame*	No. 16	Notre Dame Stadium; Notre Dame, IN	NBC	L 20–54	59,075
October 19	3:30 p.m.	UCLA	No. 25	Husky Stadium; Seattle, WA	FSN	W 41–21	70,444
October 26	12:30 p.m.	at Oregon	No. 23	Autzen Stadium; Eugene, OR (rivalry)	ABC	W 33–14	46,226
November 2	12:30 p.m.	at USC	No. 21	Los Angeles Memorial Coliseum; Los Angeles, CA	ABC	W 21–10	60,039
November 9	12:30 p.m.	Oregon State	No. 19	Husky Stadium; Seattle, WA		W 42–3	71,072
November 16	12:30 p.m.	San Jose State*	No. 15	Husky Stadium; Seattle, WA		W 53–10	70,063
November 23	3:30 p.m.	at Washington State	No. 12	Martin Stadium; Pullman, WA (Apple Cup)	FX	W 31–24 ^{OT}	37,600
December 30	5:00 p.m.	vs. No. 8 Colorado*	No. 13	Jack Murphy Stadium; San Diego, CA (Holiday Bowl)	ESPN	L 21–33	54,749
*Non-conference game; Rankings from AP Poll released prior to the game; All times are in Pacific time

== Rankings ==
Ranking movements Legend: ██ Increase in ranking ██ Decrease in ranking — = Not ranked
	Week																	
Poll	Pre	1	2	3	4	5	6	7	8	9	10	11	12	13	14	15	16	Final
AP	—	—	—	—	24	21	18	16	25	23	21	19	15	12	12	12	13	16
Coaches	22		23	—	23	21	18	16	—	24	23	20	17	15	15	13	12	15

== Game summaries ==
=== At Arizona State ===
Washington Huskies (0–0) at #20 Arizona State Sun Devils (0–0)

Quarter	1	2	3	4	Total
Washington	7	7	7	21	42
Arizona St	7	7	14	17	45

at Sun Devil Stadium, Tempe, Arizona

- Date: September 21, 1996
- Game weather: 95 °F (35 °C)
- Game attendance: 73,379

Game information

First quarter

- ASU – Michael Martin 35-yard pass from Jake Plummer (Robert Nycz kick), 11:45. Arizona St 7–0. Drive:
- WASH – Dave Janoski 67-yard punt return (kick good). Tie 7–7

Second quarter

- WASH – Rashaan Shehee 6-yard run (kick good), 6:19. Washington 14–7. Drive:
- ASU – Ricky Boyer 13-yard pass from Jake Plummer (Robert Nycz kick), 0:48. Tie 14–14. Drive:

Third quarter

- WASH – Cameron Cleeland 36-yard pass from Shane Fortney (kick good). 'Washington 21–14. Drive:
- ASU – Michael Martin 1-yard run (Robert Nycz kick). Tie 21–21. Drive:
- ASU – Isaiah Mustafa recovered fumble in end zone (Robert Nycz kick), 3:07. Arizona St 28–21.

Fourth quarter

- ASU – Terry Battle 7-yard run (Robert Nycz kick), 14:31. Arizona St 35–21. Drive:
- ASU – Steve Bush 1-yard pass from Jake Plummer (Robert Nycz kick), 12:01. Arizona St 42–21. Drive:
- WASH – Brock Huard 10-yard run (kick good), 9:00. Arizona St 42–28. Drive:
- WASH – Gerald Harris 67-yard pass from Brock Huard (kick good), 7:15. Arizona St 42–35. Drive:
- WASH – Corey Dillon 8-yard run (kick good), 5:13. Tie 42–42. Drive:
- ASU – Robert Nycz 38-yard field goal, 0:02. Arizona St 45–42. Drive:

Top passers

- WASH – Brock Huard – 6/11, 143 yards, TD
- ASU – Jake Plummer – 16/30, 186 yards, 3 TD

Top rushers

- WASH
- ASU

Top receivers

- WASH
- ASU

== Roster ==
1996 Washington Huskies football team roster
Players
Coaches
Offense

Pos.	#	Name	Class
TE	88	Jeremy Brigham	Jr
TE	85	Cameron Cleeland	Jr
OT	67	Tony Coats	So
WR	22	Fred Coleman	Jr
FB	23	Keth Crotty	Sr
OT	75	Aaron Dalan	So
WR		Andre DeSaussure
RB	4	Corey Dillon	Jr
QB	15	Shane Fortney	Jr
WR		Gerald Harris	Fr
RB		Jason Harris
RB		Anthony Hicks
RB		Terry Hollimon
QB	16	Brock Huard	So
WR	19	Dave Janoski (C)	Sr
OT	57	Lynn Johnson	Sr
G	70	Ben Kadletz	So
FB	25	George Keiaho	So
TE		Cam Kissel
C	77	Olin Kreutz	So
QB		Tom Linarelli
QB		Jon Minter
G	75	Benji Olson	So
WR	24	Jerome Pathon	Jr
FB	36	Mike Reed	So
OT	72	Bob Sapp (C)	Sr
RB		Sacha Sarieddine
RB		Maurice Shaw
RB	1	Rashaan Shehee	Jr
OL		Mostafa Sobhi

Defense

Pos.	#	Name	Class
LB	54	Ink Aleaga (C)	Sr
LB	48	Eddie Burrell	Sr
CB	8	Nigel Burton	So
CB	10	Toure Butler	Fr
DE	35	Cris Campbell	Jr
DE	46	Jason Chorak	Jr
CB	15	Javon Daniels	Fr
LB	57	John Fiala (C)	Sr
LB	6	Marques Hairston	Fr
LB	40	Jerry Jensen	Jr
CB	25	Mel Miller	Fr
S	7	Tony Parrish	Jr
DT	97	David Richie	Sr
DB		Kyle Roberts
CB	1	Jermaine Smith	Fr
CB	11	Matt Summers	Jr
LB	17	Lester Towns	Fr
NT	78	Mac Tuiaea	Fr
LB	45	Niva Tupua	Fr
LB	51	Stuart Williams	Jr
S	21	Chad Wolfe	So

Special teams

Pos.	#	Name	Class
P	14	Geoff Prince	Sr
P	34	Hamid Sarshar	Jr
K	18	John Wales	Sr

Head coach

- Jim Lambright (4th year)

Coordinators/assistant coaches

- Randy Hart (AHC, DC, DL)
- Scott Linehan (OC, WR)
- Dick Baird (LB)
- Bill Diedrick (QB)
- Rick Mallory (TE)
- Ron Milus (DB)
- Steve Morton (OL)
- Scott Pelluer (Rov, Wh LB)
- Al Roberts (RB)

Legend

- (C) Team captain
- (S) Suspended
- (I) Ineligible
- Injured
- Redshirt

Roster

== NFL draft ==
Three Huskies were selected in the 1997 NFL draft, which lasted seven rounds (240 selections).

Player	Position	Round	Pick	NFL club
Corey Dillon	Running back	2	43	Cincinnati Bengals
Bob Sapp	Guard	3	69	Chicago Bears
John Fiala	Linebacker	6	166	Miami Dolphins

== Notes ==
- Corey Dillon set a new University of Washington record for rushing yards in a season with 1,696 yards. This eclipsed Greg Lewis' 1,470 yards from 1990. The record is currently held by Bishop Sankey.
