= 1996 Stanford Cardinal football team =

American college football season

1996 Stanford Cardinal football

Sun Bowl champion

Sun Bowl, W 38–0 vs. Michigan State
- Conference: Pacific-10 Conference
- Record: 7–5 (5–3 Pac-10)
- Head coach: Tyrone Willingham (2nd season)
- Offensive coordinator: Dana Bible (2nd season)
- Offensive scheme: West Coast
- Defensive coordinator: Bill Harris (2nd season)
- Base defense: 4–3
- Home stadium: Stanford Stadium

1996 Pacific-10 Conference football standings
	Conf.			Overall
Team	W		L	W		L
No. 4 Arizona State $	8	–	0	11	–	1
No. 16 Washington	7	–	1	9	–	3
Stanford	5	–	3	7	–	5
UCLA	4	–	4	5	–	6
Oregon	3	–	5	6	–	5
California	3	–	5	6	–	6
USC	3	–	5	6	–	6
Arizona	3	–	5	5	–	6
Washington State	3	–	5	5	–	6
Oregon State	1	–	7	2	–	9
$ – Conference champion; Rankings from AP Poll

The 1996 Stanford Cardinal football team represented Stanford University as a member of the Pacific-10 Conference (Pac-10) during 1996 NCAA Division I-A football season. Led by second-year head coach Tyrone Willingham, the Cardinal compiled an overall record of 7–5 with a mark of 5–3 in conference play, placing third in the Pac-10. Stanford was invited to the Sun Bowl, where the Cardinal defeated Michigan State. The team played home games at Stanford Stadium in Stanford, California.

== Schedule ==
Date	Time	Opponent	Site	TV	Result	Attendance
September 7	4:00 p.m.	Utah*	Stanford Stadium; Stanford, CA	ABC	L 10–17	34,587
September 14	12:30 p.m.	San Jose State*	Stanford Stadium; Stanford, CA (rivalry)		W 25–2	34,150
September 21	9:30 a.m.	at Wisconsin*	Camp Randall Stadium; Madison, WI	ESPN2	L 0–14	77,894
October 5	3:30 p.m.	at No. 18 Washington	Husky Stadium; Seattle, WA	FSN	L 6–27	71,488
October 12	2:00 p.m.	Oregon	Stanford Stadium; Stanford, CA (rivalry)		W 27–24 ^{OT}	41,150
October 19	1:00 p.m.	at Oregon State	Parker Stadium; Corvallis, OR		L 12–26	21,305
October 26	12:30 p.m.	No. 4 Arizona State	Stanford Stadium; Stanford, CA	ABC	L 9–41	32,550
November 2	3:30 p.m.	at UCLA	Rose Bowl; Pasadena, CA (rivalry)	FSN	W 21–20	64,820
November 9	7:15 p.m.	USC	Stanford Stadium; Stanford, CA (rivalry)	FSN	W 24–20	41,980
November 16	12:30 p.m.	Washington State	Stanford Stadium; Stanford, CA		W 33–17	30,280
November 23	12:30 p.m.	at California	California Memorial Stadium; Berkeley, CA (Big Game)		W 42–21	70,500
December 31	11:00 a.m.	vs. Michigan State*	Sun Bowl; El Paso, TX (Sun Bowl)	CBS	W 38–0	42,271
*Non-conference game; Rankings from AP Poll released prior to the game; All times are in Pacific time

== Roster ==
1996 Stanford Cardinal football team roster
Players
Coaches
Offense

Pos.	#	Name	Class
WR	20	Jeff Allen	Jr
G	78	Brad Badger	Sr
QB	3	Tim Carey	Sr
TE	87	Greg Clark	Sr
FB	34	Greg Comella	Sr
FB	38	Ryan Rhodes	Fr
WR	80	Damon Dunn	Jr
WR	83	Marlon Evans	Sr
QB	5	Todd Husak	Fr
QB	19	Chad Hutchinson	So
WR	88	Brian Manning	Sr
WR	5	Troy Walters	So
QB	12	John Ynostroza	Jr

Defense

Pos.	#	Name	Class
ILB	33	Chris Draft	Jr
DE	75	Carl Hansen	Jr
ILB	43	Jon Haskins	Jr
CB	22	Evan Herring	So
CB	17	Corey Hill	Jr
FS	10	Tim Smith	So
OLB	2	Donnie Spragan	So
OLB	54	Nicodemus Watts	Sr
DE	94	Ryan Werner	Sr
CB	26	Alistair White	Sr
NT	51	Anthony Willis	Jr
DE	13	Kailee Wong	Jr

Special teams

Pos.	#	Name	Class

Head coach

- Tyrone Willingham

Coordinators/assistant coaches

- Dana Bible – Offensive coordinator and quarterbacks
- Don Treadwell – Running backs
- Mose Rison – wide receivers
- Dave Borbely – Offensive line (centers and guards)
- Patrick Morris – Tight ends and offensive line (tackles)
- Bill Harris – Defensive coordinator and defensive backs
- Phil Zacharias – Defensive ends and special teams coordinator
- Kent Baer – Inside and outside linebacker
- Dave Tipton – Recruiting coordinator

Legend

- (C) Team captain
- (S) Suspended
- (I) Ineligible
- Injured
- Redshirt

Roster
Last update: 1997-02-10
