= 1996 Arizona State Sun Devils football team =

American college football season

1996 Arizona State Sun Devils football

Pac-10 champion

Rose Bowl, L 17–20 vs. Ohio State
- Conference: Pacific-10 Conference

Ranking
- Coaches: No. 4
- AP: No. 4
- Record: 11–1 (8–0 Pac-10)
- Head coach: Bruce Snyder (5th season)
- Offensive coordinator: Dan Cozzetto (5th season)
- Defensive coordinator: Phil Snow (2nd season)
- Home stadium: Sun Devil Stadium

1996 Pacific-10 Conference football standings
	Conf.			Overall
Team	W		L	W		L
No. 4 Arizona State $	8	–	0	11	–	1
No. 16 Washington	7	–	1	9	–	3
Stanford	5	–	3	7	–	5
UCLA	4	–	4	5	–	6
Oregon	3	–	5	6	–	5
California	3	–	5	6	–	6
USC	3	–	5	6	–	6
Arizona	3	–	5	5	–	6
Washington State	3	–	5	5	–	6
Oregon State	1	–	7	2	–	9
$ – Conference champion; Rankings from AP Poll

The 1996 Arizona State Sun Devils football team represented Arizona State University as a member of the Pacific-10 Conference (Pac-10) during the 1996 NCAA Division I-A football season. In their fifth season under head coach Bruce Snyder, the Sun Devils compiled an overall record of 11–1 with a mark of 8–0 in conference play, winning the Pac-10 title. Arizona State earned a berth in the Rose Bowl, where they Sun Devils lost to Ohio State. The team played home games at Sun Devil Stadium in Tempe, Arizona.

Arizona State's 1996 season highlighted by a 19–0 shutout, on September 21, of the top-ranked, two-time defending national champion, Nebraska Cornhuskers in Tempe, ending Nebraska's 26-game win streak. The upset win also gained a measure of revenge from the previous season, when Sun Devils went into Lincoln, Nebraska and were not only defeated by a 77–28 margin, but were enraged after the eventual national champions threw a long touchdown pass in the game's final minutes.

Led by quarterback Jake Plummer, who finished third in the voting for the Heisman Trophy, Arizona State was undefeated heading into the Rose Bowl against the Ohio State Buckeyes. Had the Sun Devils won the game, they would have had a chance of capturing at least a share of the national championship, as they would have been the only undefeated major-college team in the nation. The Sun Devils led 17–14 with 1:47 left in the fourth quarter, but surrendered a late touchdown to Ohio State, falling by a final score of 20–17.

== Schedule ==
Date	Time	Opponent	Rank	Site	TV	Result	Attendance
September 7	7:00 pm	Washington	No. 20	Sun Devil Stadium; Tempe, AZ	FSN	W 45–42	73,379
September 14	7:00 pm	North Texas*	No. 18	Sun Devil Stadium; Tempe, AZ		W 52–7	46,173
September 21	7:15 pm	No. 1 Nebraska*	No. 17	Sun Devil Stadium; Tempe, AZ	FSN	W 19–0	74,089
September 28	3:30 pm	Oregon	No. 6	Sun Devil Stadium; Tempe, AZ	FSN	W 48–27	54,618
October 5	7:00 pm	Boise State*	No. 5	Sun Devil Stadium; Tempe, AZ		W 56–7	49,018
October 12	12:30 pm	at UCLA	No. 4	Rose Bowl; Pasadena, CA	ABC	W 42–34	66,107
October 19	12:30 pm	USC	No. 4	Sun Devil Stadium; Tempe, AZ	ABC	W 48–35 ^{2OT}	74,947
October 26	12:30 pm	at Stanford	No. 4	Stanford Stadium; Stanford, CA	ABC	W 41–9	32,550
November 2	2:00 pm	at Oregon State	No. 4	Parker Stadium; Corvallis, OR		W 29–14	21,946
November 9	4:30 pm	California^{†}	No. 4	Sun Devil Stadium; Tempe, AZ	FSN	W 35–7	74,963
November 23	4:30 pm	at Arizona	No. 4	Arizona Stadium; Tucson, AZ (rivalry)	FSN	W 56–14	59,920
January 1, 1997	1:30 pm	vs. No. 4 Ohio State*	No. 2	Rose Bowl; Pasadena, CA (Rose Bowl)	ABC	L 17–20	100,635
*Non-conference game; ^{†}Homecoming; Rankings from Coaches' Poll released prior to the game; All times are in Mountain time

== Rankings ==
Ranking movements Legend: ██ Increase in ranking ██ Decrease in ranking — = Not ranked ( ) = First-place votes
	Week																	
Poll	Pre	1	2	3	4	5	6	7	8	9	10	11	12	13	14	15	16	Final
AP	20	20	20	18	17	6 (1)	5 (1)	4 (1)	4 (1)	4 (1)	4 (1)	4 (1)	4 (2)	4 (2)	3 (3)	2 (5)	2 (5)	4
Coaches Poll	—	—	—	23	22	12	7	5	5	4	4	4	4	4	3 (3)	2 (6)	2 (5)	4

== Game summaries ==
=== Washington ===
Washington Huskies (0–0) at #20 Arizona State Sun Devils (0–0)

Quarter	1	2	3	4	Total
Washington	7	7	7	21	42
Arizona St	7	7	14	17	45

at Sun Devil Stadium, Tempe, Arizona

- Date: September 21, 1996
- Game weather: 95 °F (35 °C)
- Game attendance: 73,379

Game information

First quarter

- ASU – Michael Martin 35-yard pass from Jake Plummer (Robert Nycz kick), 11:45. Arizona St 7–0. Drive:
- WASH – Dave Janoski 67-yard punt return (kick good). Tie 7–7

Second quarter

- WASH – Rashaan Shehee 6-yard run (kick good), 6:19. Washington 14–7. Drive:
- ASU – Ricky Boyer 13-yard pass from Jake Plummer (Robert Nycz kick), 0:48. Tie 14–14. Drive:

Third quarter

- WASH – Cameron Cleeland 36-yard pass from Shane Fortney (kick good). 'Washington 21–14. Drive:
- ASU – Michael Martin 1-yard run (Robert Nycz kick). Tie 21–21. Drive:
- ASU – Isaiah Mustafa recovered fumble in end zone (Robert Nycz kick), 3:07. Arizona St 28–21.

Fourth quarter

- ASU – Terry Battle 7-yard run (Robert Nycz kick), 14:31. Arizona St 35–21. Drive:
- ASU – Steve Bush 1-yard pass from Jake Plummer (Robert Nycz kick), 12:01. Arizona St 42–21. Drive:
- WASH – Brock Huard 10-yard run (kick good), 9:00. Arizona St 42–28. Drive:
- WASH – Gerald Harris 67-yard pass from Brock Huard (kick good), 7:15. Arizona St 42–35. Drive:
- WASH – Corey Dillon 8-yard run (kick good), 5:13. Tie 42–42. Drive:
- ASU – Robert Nycz 38-yard field goal, 0:02. Arizona St 45–42. Drive:

Top passers

- WASH – Brock Huard – 6/11, 143 yards, TD
- ASU – Jake Plummer – 16/30, 186 yards, 3 TD

Top rushers

- WASH
- ASU

Top receivers

- WASH
- ASU

=== Nebraska ===
Nebraska at Arizona State

Team	1	2	3	4	Total
No. 1 Cornhuskers	0	0	0	0	0
• No. 17 Sun Devils	9	8	0	2	19

- Date: September 21
- Location: Sun Devil Stadium, Tempe, Arizona
- Game attendance: 74,089

Scoring summary
1	11:38	ASU	Keith Poole 22-yard pass from Jake Plummer (Robert Nycz kick)	ASU 7–0
1	10:38	ASU	Safety, Ahman Green fumbled out of end zone	ASU 9–0
2	8:59	ASU	Robert Nycz 27-yard field goal	ASU 12–0
2	2:19	ASU	Safety, ball snapped out of end zone	ASU 14–0
2	0:30	ASU	Robert Nycz 44-yard field goal	ASU 17–0
4	6:43	ASU	Safety, Scott Frost tackled in end zone	ASU 19–0

=== At UCLA ===
Arizona State at UCLA

Team	1	2	3	4	Total
• No. 4 Sun Devils	7	7	7	21	42
Bruins	21	7	6	0	34

- Date: October 12
- Location: Rose Bowl, Pasadena, California
- Game attendance: 66,107

=== At Oregon State ===
Arizona State at Oregon State

Team	1	2	3	4	Total
• No. 4 Sun Devils	6	3	13	7	29
Beavers	0	14	0	0	14

- Date: November 2
- Location: Parker Stadium, Corvallis, Oregon
- Game attendance: 21,946

=== California ===
California at Arizona State

Team	1	2	3	4	Total
Golden Bears	7	0	0	0	7
• No. 20 Sun Devils	0	14	7	14	35

- Date: November 9
- Location: Sun Devil Stadium, Tempe, Arizona
- Game attendance: 74,963

=== At Arizona ===
#4 Arizona State Sun Devils (10–0) at Arizona Wildcats (5–5)

Quarter	1	2	3	4	Total
Arizona St	7	21	14	14	56
Arizona	0	7	0	7	14

at Arizona Stadium, Tucson, Arizona

- Date: November 23, 1996
- Game weather: Cloudy, 62 °F (17 °C)
- Game attendance: 59,920
- Recap/Box Score

Game information

First quarter

- ASU – Terry Battle 20-yard run (Robert Nycz kick), 0:15. Arizona St 7–0. Drive: 3 plays, 34 yards, 0:59.

Second quarter

- ASU – Terry Battle 4-yard run (Robert Nycz kick), 12:17. Arizona St 14–0. Drive: 2 plays, 5 yards, 0:32.
- ARIZ – Keith Smith 1-yard run (Matt Peyton kick), 8:20. Arizona St 14–7. Drive: 7 plays, 70 yards, 3:57.
- ASU – Keith Poole 27-yard pass from Jake Plummer (Robert Nycz kick), 7:13. Arizona St 21–7. Drive: 3 plays, 75 yards, 1:07.
- ASU – Terry Battle 1-yard run (Robert Nycz kick), 1:17. Arizona St 28–7. Drive: 6 plays, 73 yards, 1:45.

Third quarter

- ASU – Keith Poole 40-yard pass from Jake Plummer (Robert Nycz kick), 10:22. Arizona St 35–7. Drive: 7 plays, 69 yards, 2:30.
- ASU – Steve Bush 10-yard pass from Jake Plummer (Robert Nycz kick), 0:39. Arizona St 42–7. Drive: 8 plays, 53 yards, 3:24.

Fourth quarter

- ARIZ – Mikal Smith 98-yard interception return (Matt Peyton kick), 12:18. Arizona St 42–14.
- ASU – Marlon Farlow 1-yard run (Robert Nycz kick), 10:47. Arizona St 49–14. Drive: 5 plays, 56 yards, 1:31.
- ASU – Marlon Farlow 8-yard run (Robert Nycz kick), 1:06. Arizona St 56–14. Drive: 11 plays, 85 yards, 7:27.

Top passers

- ASU – Jake Plummer – 10/19, 201 yards, 3 TD, 2 int
- ARIZ – Keith Smith – 6/15, 91 yards, INT

Top rushers

- ASU – Terry Battle – 23 rushes, 143 yards, 3 TD
- ARIZ – Leon Callen – 6 rushes, 19 yards

Top receivers

- ASU – Keith Poole – 4 receptions, 123 yards, 2 TD
- ARIZ – Jeremy McDaniel – 2 receptions, 54 yards

- Bruce Snyder's 100th career win
- Terry Battle passes 1,000 yards rushing for the season (ASU – 450 rush yards)

=== Vs. Ohio State (Rose Bowl) ===
Ohio State vs. Arizona State

Team	1	2	3	4	Total
• No. 4 Buckeyes	7	0	7	6	20
No. 2 Sun Devils	0	7	3	7	17

- Date: January 1
- Location: Rose Bowl
- Game attendance: 100,635
- Referee: Terry Monk
- TV announcers (ABC): Brent Musburger (Play-by-play), Dick Vermeil (Analyst), and Jack Arute (Sideline)

Scoring summary
1	5:04	OSU	David Boston 9-yard pass from Stanley Jackson (Josh Jackson kick)	OSU 7–0
2	10:04	ASU	Ricky Boyer 25-yard pass from Jake Plummer (Robert Nycz kick)	Tied 7–7
3	9:12	ASU	Robert Nycz 37-yard field goal	ASU 10–7
3	8:23	OSU	Dimitrious Stanley 72-yard pass from Joe Germaine (J. Jackson kick)	OSU 14–10
4	1:40	ASU	Plummer 11-yard run (Nycz kick)	ASU 17–14
4	0:19	OSU	Boston 5-yard pass from Germaine (kick blocked)	OSU 20–17

== Roster ==
1996 Arizona State Sun Devils football team roster
Players
Coaches
Offense

Pos.	#	Name	Class
TE		Kendrick Bates
RB	8	Terry Battle	Sr
WR	24	Ricky Boyer	So
TE	82	Steve Bush	Sr
QB	11	Steve Campbell	So
RB		Marlon Farlow
QB		Gus Farwell
OT	70	Glen Gable	Jr
RB	39	Scott Hansen	Jr
WR	83	Lenzie Jackson	So
TE	87	Brian Jennings	Fr
TE	88	Devin Kendall	Sr
RB	29	Michael Martin	Jr
WR	81	Kenny Mitchell	So
RB		Mike Morales
G	56	Kyle Murphy	Jr
WR	7	Isaiah Mustafa
FB	44	Jeff Paulk	So
QB	16	Jake Plummer	Sr
WR	3	Keith Poole	Sr
RB	21	J. R. Redmond	Fr
C	65	Kirk Robertson	Sr
OL		Zack Romero
OT	74	Juan Roque	Sr
G	51	Grey Ruegamer	So
OT	71	Marvel Smith	Fr
WR		Craig Spenn
OL	67	Pat Thompson	Sr
RB		Kevin Tommasini

Defense

Pos.	#	Name	Class
DB	12	Jeremy Alexander	Sr
DE	98	Vincent Amey	Jr
DL		Albrey Battle
DE	55	Dave Baumgartner	Sr
DT	94	Brent Burnstein	Sr
DE	93	Malchi Crawford	Jr
LB	47	Chris Finn	Sr
DB		Mitchell Freedman
DB		Courtney Jackson
DB	39	Damien Richardson	Jr
LB	59	Derrick Rodgers	Sr
DT	92	Jeremy Staat	Jr
CB	10	Jason Simmons	Sr
S	9	Thomas Simmons	Jr
LB	36	Derek Smith	Sr
DB		Marcus Soward
DT	99	Shawn Swayda	Sr
DB	42	Pat Tillman	Jr
DB, RB	22	Raenaurd Turpin	Sr
LB	50	Scott Von der Ahe	Sr

Special teams

Pos.	#	Name	Class
P	17	Lance Anderson	Jr
K	41	Robert Nycz	Jr

Head coach

- Bruce Snyder

Coordinators/assistant coaches

- Dan Cozzetto – Offensive coordinator
- Phil Snow – Defensive coordinator
- Kevin Wolthausen – Defensive line

Legend

- (C) Team captain
- (S) Suspended
- (I) Ineligible
- Injured
- Redshirt

Roster

== Awards and honors ==
- Jake Plummer: Pac-10 Offensive Player of the Year, Third in Heisman Trophy balloting
- Bruce Snyder: Paul "Bear" Bryant Award

== 1996 team players in the NFL ==
The following players were claimed in the 1997 NFL draft.

Player	Position	Round	Pick	NFL club
Juan Roque	Tackle	2	35	Detroit Lions
Jake Plummer	Quarterback	2	42	Arizona Cardinals
Derek M. Smith	Outside Linebacker	3	80	Washington Redskins
Derrick Rodgers	Outside Linebacker	3	92	Miami Dolphins
Keith Poole	Wide receiver	4	116	New Orleans Saints
Scott Von der Ahe	Linebacker	6	182	Indianapolis Colts
Shawn Swayda	Defensive tackle	6	196	Chicago Bears
Terry Battle	Running back	7	206	Detroit Lions
