= 1996 Arizona Wildcats football team =

American college football season

1996 Arizona Wildcats football
- Conference: Pacific-10 Conference
- Record: 5–6 (3–5 Pac-10)
- Head coach: Dick Tomey (10th season)
- Offensive coordinator: Homer Smith (1st season)
- Defensive coordinator: Larry Mac Duff (10th season)
- Home stadium: Arizona Stadium

1996 Pacific-10 Conference football standings
	Conf.			Overall
Team	W		L	W		L
No. 4 Arizona State $	8	–	0	11	–	1
No. 16 Washington	7	–	1	9	–	3
Stanford	5	–	3	7	–	5
UCLA	4	–	4	5	–	6
Oregon	3	–	5	6	–	5
California	3	–	5	6	–	6
USC	3	–	5	6	–	6
Arizona	3	–	5	5	–	6
Washington State	3	–	5	5	–	6
Oregon State	1	–	7	2	–	9
$ – Conference champion; Rankings from AP Poll

The 1996 Arizona Wildcats football team represented the University of Arizona in the Pacific-10 Conference (Pac-10) during the 1996 NCAA Division I-A football season. In their tenth season under head coach Dick Tomey, the Wildcats compiled a 5–6 record (3–5 against Pac-10 opponents), finished in a tie for fifth place in the Pac-10, and outscored their opponents, 310 to 280.

The team played its home games in Arizona Stadium in Tucson, Arizona. On November 23, 1996, the team drew a record crowd of 59,920 to Arizona Stadium to watch a 56–14 loss to Arizona State. As of today, this remains the Arizona Stadium attendance record. The Wildcats allowed 450 rushing yards in the loss to the Sun Devils. The highlight of the Arizona State game for the Wildcats was a 98-yard interception return, the second longest in program history, by Mikal Smith.

Team records set during the 1996 season included: three interception returns for touchdown in a game (vs. Illinois); eight touchdowns allowed in a game (vs. California); 16 touchdowns scored in a Pac-10 game (vs. UCLA); 659 yards of total offense allowed in a Pac-10 game (vs. California); and 450 rushing yards allowed in a Pac-10 game (vs. Arizona State).

The team's statistical leaders included Keith Smith with 1,450 passing yards, Gary Taylor with 564 rushing yards, and Jeremy McDaniel with 607 receiving yards. Linebacker Chester Burnett led the team with 124 tackles.

== Schedule ==
Date	Time	Opponent	Site	TV	Result	Attendance
August 31	7:00 p.m.	UTEP*	Arizona Stadium; Tucson, AZ	KTTU	W 23–3	40,388
September 7	10:30 a.m.	at No. 22 Iowa*	Kinnick Stadium; Iowa City, IA	ESPN	L 20–21	68,267
September 14	7:00 p.m.	Illinois*	Arizona Stadium; Tucson, AZ	Prime	W 41–0	43,012
September 21	12:30 p.m.	at No. 24 Washington	Husky Stadium; Seattle, WA	ABC	L 17–31	73,414
October 5	7:00 p.m.	Washington State	Arizona Stadium; Tucson, AZ	Prime AZ	W 34–26	47,405
October 12	3:30 p.m.	at USC	Los Angeles Memorial Coliseum; Los Angeles, CA	Prime	L 7–14	51,088
October 26	7:00 p.m.	Oregon State	Arizona Stadium; Tucson, AZ	KTTU	W 33–7	43,716
November 2	12:30 p.m.	at California	California Memorial Stadium; Berkeley, CA	FSN	L 55–56 ^{4OT}	35,000
November 9	2:00 p.m.	at Oregon	Autzen Stadium; Eugene, OR	FSN	L 31–49	40,721
November 16	1:30 p.m.	UCLA^{†}	Arizona Stadium; Tucson, AZ	ABC	W 35–17	47,171
November 23	4:30 p.m.	No. 4 Arizona State	Arizona Stadium; Tucson, AZ (rivalry)	FSN	L 14–56	59,920
*Non-conference game; ^{†}Homecoming; Rankings from AP Poll released prior to the game; All times are in Mountain time

== Before the season ==
After completing the 1995 season, the Wildcats had to rebuild the team by finding recruits. Duane Akina, the team’s offensive coordinator since 1992, stepped down from his position and would become the defensive backs coach. Tomey brought in Alabama offensive coordinator Homer Smith to take over at the same position to fix Arizona’s offense that had been mediocre under Akina. They also had to get a new quarterback and replacing most of the “Desert Swarm” defensive players, which included Tedy Bruschi, the leader of the unit, who graduated.

By the preseason, Arizona, even though with a new offensive coordinator, was picked to finish in the bottom half of the Pac-10 standings.

== Game summaries ==
=== Iowa ===
Arizona went to Iowa City and took on the Hawkeyes, who were ranked 22nd. It was Tomey’s first meeting against Iowa since his first season with the Wildcats in 1987 (Arizona lost to the Hawkeyes that year). The Wildcats would play tough with Iowa, but mistakes would cost them a chance at winning and they came up short.

=== Illinois ===
At home, the Wildcats hosted Illinois in their second straight game against a Big Ten opponent. Arizona’s defense would play like the Desert Swarm by picking apart the Illini offense and intercepted five passes, with three of them being returned for touchdowns on its way to a shutout victory and avenging the Wildcats’ loss to the Illini in the previous season. To date, this remains the most recent meeting between Arizona and Illinois.

=== USC ===
Arizona traveled to the Coliseum to face USC. The Wildcats would hold the Trojans in check, but the offense struggled in a defense-dominated game. Arizona committed crucial turnovers during scoring threats, which would ultimately lead them to lose.

=== California ===
The Wildcats traveled to Berkeley to play California. The game would go back and forth between the two teams and went to overtime. It was the first overtime game for Arizona in its football history. Both teams would then trade touchdowns in the first three periods which set up a wild fourth frame.

In the fourth overtime period, the Golden Bears scored to regain the lead at 56–49. The Wildcats then answered on their possession with a touchdown of their own to make it 56–55. However, on the extra point attempt, Arizona faked the play but botched an errant two-point conversion run which would have been for the win and California escaped with the victory.

After the game, Tomey said that he wanted to go for the win instead of forcing a fifth overtime due to the team being exhausted after four overtimes. He also said that the blunder on the game’s final play would likely affect the team for the rest of the reason.

=== UCLA ===
On homecoming day, the Wildcats hosted UCLA. After a slow first half, Arizona came up big in the second half with touchdowns, including one on a returned interception and another on a kickoff. The Wildcats would then shut down the Bruins the rest of the way for the win and kept their bowl hopes alive.

=== Arizona State ===
#4 Arizona State Sun Devils (10–0) at Arizona Wildcats (5–5)

Quarter	1	2	3	4	Total
Sun Devils	7	21	14	14	56
Wildcats	0	7	0	7	14

at Arizona Stadium, Tucson, Arizona

- Date: November 23, 1996
- Game time: 4:30 p.m. MST
- Game weather: Cloudy, 62 °F (17 °C)
- Game attendance: 59,920
- TV: FSN
- Recap/Box Score

Game information

First quarter

- ASU – Terry Battle 20-yard run (Robert Nycz kick), 0:15. Arizona State 7–0. Drive: 3 plays, 34 yards, 0:59.

Second quarter

- ASU – Terry Battle 4-yard run (Robert Nycz kick), 12:17. Arizona State 14–0. Drive: 2 plays, 5 yards, 0:32.
- ARIZ – Keith Smith 1-yard run (Matt Peyton kick), 8:20. Arizona State 14–7. Drive: 7 plays, 70 yards, 3:57.
- ASU – Keith Poole 27-yard pass from Jake Plummer (Robert Nycz kick), 7:13. Arizona State 21–7. Drive: 3 plays, 75 yards, 1:07.
- ASU – Terry Battle 1-yard run (Robert Nycz kick), 1:17. Arizona State 28–7. Drive: 6 plays, 73 yards, 1:45.

Third quarter

- ASU – Keith Poole 40-yard pass from Jake Plummer (Robert Nycz kick), 10:22. Arizona State 35–7. Drive: 7 plays, 69 yards, 2:30.
- ASU – Steve Bush 10-yard pass from Jake Plummer (Robert Nycz kick), 0:39. Arizona State 42–7. Drive: 8 plays, 53 yards, 3:24.

Fourth quarter

- ARIZ – Mikal Smith 98-yard interception return (Matt Peyton kick), 12:18. Arizona State 42–14.
- ASU – Marlon Farlow 1-yard run (Robert Nycz kick), 10:47. Arizona State 49–14. Drive: 5 plays, 56 yards, 1:31.
- ASU – Marlon Farlow 8-yard run (Robert Nycz kick), 1:06. Arizona State 56–14. Drive: 11 plays, 85 yards, 7:27.

Top passers

- ASU – Jake Plummer – 10/19, 201 yards, 3 TD, 2 INT
- ARIZ – Keith Smith – 6/15, 91 yards, INT

Top rushers

- ASU – Terry Battle – 23 rushes, 143 yards, 3 TD
- ARIZ – Leon Callen – 6 rushes, 19 yards

Top receivers

- ASU – Keith Poole – 4 receptions, 123 yards, 2 TD
- ARIZ – Jeremy McDaniel – 2 receptions, 54 yards

In the season finale, the Wildcats hosted Arizona State in the annual “Duel in the Desert”. The Sun Devils, who were ranked fourth and unbeaten, had already clinched the Pac-10 and a spot in the Rose Bowl and the Wildcats hoped to spoil ASU’s possible national title hopes like they did ten years prior. However, all of these plans were put to rest as ASU jumped out to an early lead and broke the game open before halftime, as Arizona didn’t seem to have a chance against the mighty Devils.

A bright spot for the Wildcats occurred early in the fourth quarter after a wild sequence of events. With the Devils up big at 42–7 and Wildcat fans already heading for the exits, ASU threw a pass toward the end zone that was intercepted by Arizona and returned 98 yards for a touchdown, which mirrored the Wildcats’ pick-six against ASU in 1986. During the play, an ASU offensive player shoved a violent hit on an Arizona defender, which would lead to a fight between both teams and the ASU player involved being ejected from the game. Both teams were also penalized for the brawl.

After order was restored, ASU would add a pair of scores to ice the game. In the end though, the Wildcats’ deficit was too much to overcome and lost big to end their season at 5–6 and missing the postseason.

Tomey told reporters after the game that ASU “played like an NFL team” against the Wildcats by putting up several points and stopping Arizona’s offense. Arizona State would ultimately lose to Ohio State in the Rose Bowl, much to the delight of Wildcat fans.

== Awards and honors ==
- Chris McAlister, CB, First-team All-Pac-10, Consensus All-American

== Season notes ==
- Arizona and the Desert Swarm struggled sporadically throughout the season due to them rebuilding without Bruschi, through they seemed to improve late in the year before losing big to Arizona State in the finale.
- Arizona Stadium featured new changes, as the midfield logo that commemorated Arizona’s 100th anniversary of its athletic teams, though it read “1897–1997” due to it being founded in the spring of 1897, which was technically during the 1896–97 school year. As a result, the logo was used during this season instead of the next (1997). In addition, the north end zone read “Bear Down” (Arizona’s motto) and the south read “Arizona” (due to “Bear Down, Arizona” being the Wildcats’ de facto fight song).
- The Wildcats alternated wins and losses in most of the first half of the season. In the second half, they would lose more due to inexperience at the quarterback position and costly turnovers. Three of the six losses were by close margins and that the mistakes in them may have cost Arizona a chance at a bowl game.
- Two of the Wildcats’ non-conference opponents were from the Big Ten Conference, Iowa and Illinois. Arizona would lose to the former and win against the latter.
- After shutting out Illinois, the Wildcats would not shut out an opponent again until 2008.
- Even though Arizona lost its first overtime game at California, the two teams would play another overtime contest the following season, in which the Wildcats would win. Due to concerns that overtime games could take too long and possibly last forever, the NCAA made changes to overtime rules in 1997 that saw two-point conversion attempts after touchdowns from the third overtime onward.
- Following its victory over UCLA, the Wildcats did not beat the Bruins at home again until 2005.
- The game against Arizona State was the Wildcats’ toughest test of the season and by losing to them, it prevented Arizona from having a perfect home record, as they won all of their other games before then.
- The record crowd for the rivalry game against Arizona State was a result of more fans attending due to the fact that ASU was ranked in the top five and being in the hunt for the national championship. In addition, over half of the Arizona Stadium crowd at the game were mostly from the Phoenix area that drove to Tucson for the anticipated rivalry matchup and that the Wildcat fans who attended didn’t expect Arizona to have a chance at a big upset due to ASU being extremely difficult to beat. The attendance record still stands as of today, and that it is highly unlikely it will ever be broken in the near future.

== After the season ==
The Wildcats had to once again rebuild the program after concluding the season. Defensive coordinator Larry Mac Duff, who had been with Arizona since Tomey’s hiring in 1987 and one of the masterminds of the Desert Swarm, would leave Arizona to become the special teams coach for the NFL’s New York Giants. Arizona had to replace him with a new coach to re-energize the defense and only the last few members of the Swarm remained on the team.

The 1996 football season would become forgotten by the spring of 1997, as Arizona’s basketball team reached the Final Four and won the national championship, though the football program continued to rebuild and recruit during the span.

The Wildcats' rebuilding offense would later improve and become dominant for the rest of the decade, and become a force in the Pac-10 as well as in the nation.

== Roster ==
1996 Arizona Wildcats football team roster
Players
Coaches
Offense

Pos.	#	Name	Class
QB	10	Brady Batten	Jr
WR		Brad Brennan	Fr
RB	27	Leon Callen	Fr
RB	30	Trung Canidate	Fr
RB		Keijuan Grubbs	Fr
WR		Richard Dice
RB		Kelvin Eafon
QB	14	Ryan Hesson	Sr
WR	5	Ron Holmes	So
OL		Rusty James
QB	19	Dan Loyd	Fr
TE	88	Mike Lucky	So
TE	96	Jeff Malone	Jr
WR	15	Jeremy McDaniel	Jr
TE		Michael Metzler
OL	73	Frank Middleton	Sr
RB		Charles Myles
RB	33	Dennis Northcutt	Fr
OL	77	Jose Portilla	Jr
RB		Kevin Schmidtke
OL	72	Yusef Scott	Fr
QB		Keith Smith
RB		Scooter Sprotte
RB		Gary Taylor
OL		Ryan Turley
OL		Willie Walker
WR		Rodney Williams
OL		Wayne Wyatt

Defense

Pos.	#	Name	Class
LB	40	Marcus Bell	Fr
LB	35	Chester Burnett	Jr
DB		David Fipp
DB		Leland Gayles
DL		Daniel Greer
DL		Tyrone Gunn
DB		Kelly Malveaux
CB	11	Chris McAlister	So
LB	31	DaShon Polk	So
DT	56	Joe Salave'a	Sr
DB		Mikal Smith
LB		Jimmy Sprotte
LB		Mike Szlauko
DL		Steve Tafua
DE	90	Van Tuinei	Sr
DL		Chiuma Ugwu
LB		Armon Williams

Special teams

Pos.	#	Name	Class
K	41	Matt Peyton	Sr

Head coach

- Dick Tomey

Coordinators/assistant coaches

Legend

- (C) Team captain
- (S) Suspended
- (I) Ineligible
- Injured
- Redshirt

Roster
