= 1996 USC Trojans football team =

American college football season

1996 USC Trojans football
- Conference: Pacific-10 Conference
- Record: 6–6 (3–5 Pac-10)
- Head coach: John Robinson (11th season)
- Offensive coordinator: Mike Riley (4th season)
- Defensive coordinator: Keith Burns (3rd season)
- Captains: John Allred; Sammy Knight
- Home stadium: Los Angeles Memorial Coliseum

1996 Pacific-10 Conference football standings
| | Conf. | | | Overall |
| Team | W | | L | W | | L |
|---|---|---|---|---|---|---|
| No. 4 Arizona State $ | 8 | – | 0 | 11 | – | 1 |
| No. 16 Washington | 7 | – | 1 | 9 | – | 3 |
| Stanford | 5 | – | 3 | 7 | – | 5 |
| UCLA | 4 | – | 4 | 5 | – | 6 |
| Oregon | 3 | – | 5 | 6 | – | 5 |
| California | 3 | – | 5 | 6 | – | 6 |
| USC | 3 | – | 5 | 6 | – | 6 |
| Arizona | 3 | – | 5 | 5 | – | 6 |
| Washington State | 3 | – | 5 | 5 | – | 6 |
| Oregon State | 1 | – | 7 | 2 | – | 9 |
$ – Conference champion; Rankings from AP Poll

The 1996 USC Trojans football team represented the University of Southern California (USC) in the 1996 NCAA Division I-A football season. In their 11th year under head coach John Robinson, the Trojans compiled a 6–6 record (3–5 against conference opponents), finished in a five-way tie for fifth place in the Pacific-10 Conference (Pac-10) championship, and outscored their opponents by a combined total of 325 to 267.

Quarterback Brad Otton led the team in passing, completing 196 of 370 passes for 2,649 yards with 20 touchdowns and 10 interceptions. LaVale Woods led the team in rushing with 119 carries for 601 yards and seven touchdowns. Chris Miller led the team in receiving with 43 catches for 793 yards and five touchdowns.

== Schedule ==
| Date | Time | Opponent | Rank | Site | TV | Result | Attendance |
|---|---|---|---|---|---|---|---|
| August 25 | 11:00 a.m. | vs. No. 11 Penn State* | No. 7 | Giants Stadium; East Rutherford, NJ (Kickoff Classic) | ABC | L 7–24 | 77,716 |
| September 7 | 12:30 p.m. | at Illinois* | No. 19 | Memorial Stadium; Champaign, IL | ABC | W 55–3 | 56,504 |
| September 14 | 3:30 p.m. | Oregon State | No. 16 | Los Angeles Memorial Coliseum; Los Angeles, CA | Prime | W 46–17 | 48,069 |
| September 21 | 12:30 p.m. | at Houston* | No. 15 | Astrodome; Houston, TX | Prime | W 26–9 | 21,035 |
| October 5 | 12:30 p.m. | California | No. 17 | Los Angeles Memorial Coliseum; Los Angeles, CA | ABC | L 15–22 | 51,511 |
| October 12 | 3:30 p.m. | Arizona | | Los Angeles Memorial Coliseum; Los Angeles, CA | FX | W 14–7 | 51,088 |
| October 19 | 12:30 p.m. | at No. 4 Arizona State | | Sun Devil Stadium; Tempe, AZ | ABC | L 35–48 ^{2OT} | 74,947 |
| October 26 | 7:15 p.m. | at Washington State | | Martin Stadium; Pullman, WA | Prime | W 29–24 | 33,111 |
| November 2 | 12:30 p.m. | No. 21 Washington^{†} | | Los Angeles Memorial Coliseum; Los Angeles, CA | ABC | L 10–21 | 60,039 |
| November 9 | 7:15 p.m. | at Stanford | | Stanford Stadium; Stanford, CA (rivalry) | Prime | L 20–24 | 41,980 |
| November 23 | 12:30 p.m. | at UCLA | | Rose Bowl; Pasadena, CA (Victory Bell) | ABC | L 41–48 ^{2OT} | 80,644 |
| November 30 | 5:00 p.m. | No. 10 Notre Dame* | | Los Angeles Memorial Coliseum; Los Angeles, CA (rivalry) | ABC | W 27–20 ^{OT} | 90,296 |
*Non-conference game; ^{†}Homecoming; Rankings from AP Poll released prior to the game; All times are in Pacific time

== Game summaries ==
=== Notre Dame ===
#10 Notre Dame Fighting Irish (8–2) at USC Trojans (5–6)

| Quarter | 1 | 2 | 3 | 4 | OT | Total |
|---|---|---|---|---|---|---|
| Notre Dame | 0 | 7 | 7 | 6 | 0 | 20 |
| USC | 6 | 0 | 0 | 14 | 7 | 27 |

at Los Angeles Memorial Coliseum • Los Angeles, California

- Date: November 30
- Game attendance: 90,296
- TV announcers (ABC): Brent Musburger and Dick Vermeil
- USA Today

Game information

Notre Dame

- Ron Powlus
  8/19, 108 Yds, TD
- Autry Denson
  33 Rush, 160 Yds, TD
- Emmett Mosley
  3 Rec, 29 Yds

USC

- Brad Otton
  13/25, 183 Yds, 2 TD
- Delon Washington
  15 Rush, 67 Yds, TD
- Chris Miller
  4 Rec, 69 Yds, TD

Scoring summary

| Quarter | Time | Drive | | | Team | Scoring information | Score | |
| Quarter | Time | Plays | Yards | TOP | Team | Scoring information | ND | USC |
|---|---|---|---|---|---|---|---|---|
| 1 | | | | | USC | 30-yard field goal by Abrams | 0 | 3 |
| 1 | | | | | USC | 38-yard field goal by Abrams | 0 | 6 |
| 2 | 14:23 | | | | Notre Dame | Spencer 1-yard touchdown run, Sanson kick good | 7 | 6 |
| 3 | 0:23 | | | | Notre Dame | Champion 25-yard touchdown reception from Powlus, Sanson kick good | 14 | 6 |
| 4 | | | | | USC | C. Miller 5-yard touchdown reception from Otton, 2-point pass failed | 14 | 12 |
| 4 | 4:52 | | | | Notre Dame | Denson 9-yard touchdown run, Sanson kick no good | 20 | 12 |
| 4 | 1:50 | | | | USC | Washington 15-yard touchdown run, 2-point run good | 20 | 20 |
| OT | | | | | USC | Sermons 5-yard touchdown reception from Otton, Abrams kick good | 20 | 27 |
| "TOP" = time of possession. For other American football terms, see Glossary of American football. | | | | | | | 20 | 27 |

== Roster ==
1996 USC Trojans football team roster
Players
Coaches
Offense

| Pos. | # | Name | Class |
|---|---|---|---|
| WR | 2 | Chris Miller | Sr |
| WR | 3 | Billy Miller | So |
| QB | 4 | John Fox | Fr |
| RB | 5 | Rodney Sermons | Jr |
| TB | 7 | Chad Morton | Fr |
| QB | 9 | Quincy Woods | Fr |
| QB | 10 | Brad Otton | Sr |
| WR | 18 | R. Jay Soward | Fr |
| RB | 24 | Delon Washington | Jr |
| OT | 60 | Jon Walkwitz | Fr |
| G | 61 | Matt McShane | Fr |
| G | 62 | David Pratchard | So |
| C | 63 | Mark Manskar | Fr |
| G, OT | 65 | Brett Samperi | Fr |
| G | 67 | Chris Brymer | Jr |
| OT | 68 | Brent McCaffrey | Fr |
| C, LS | 69 | Pat Smith | Fr |
| OT | 70 | Mike Whitcanack | Fr |
| G, OT | 71 | Travis Claridge | Fr |
| G | 73 | Phalen Pounds | Jr |
| OT | 74 | Ken Bowen | So |
| OT, G | 75 | Faaesea Mailo | Fr |
| OT, G | 76 | Joel Sugg | Fr |
| G | 77 | Trevor Roberts | Fr |
| OT | 78 | Rome Douglas | So |
| OT | 79 | Grant Boelter | Jr |
| WR | 80 | Larry Parker | Jr |
| WR | 81 | Stanley Guyness | Fr |
| TE | 82 | Gurjot Dhaliwal | So |
| WR | 83 | Troy Garner | Fr |
| TE | 84 | Jeff Diltz | Sr |
| WR | 85 | Santiago Coleman | So |
| TE | 88 | Travis Hall | Sr |
| TE | 89 | John Allred | Sr |

Defense

| Pos. | # | Name | Class |
|---|---|---|---|
| CB | 1 | Daylon McCutcheon | So |
| S | 9 | Sammy Knight | Jr |
| DB | 27 | David Gibson | Fr |
| LB | 40 | Bob Aubrey | So |
| S, CB | 42 | Brian Kelly | Jr |
| LB | 55 | Chris Claiborne | Fr |
| DT | 95 | Marc Matock | So |
| DT | 96 | Darrell Russell | Jr |
| DT | 99 | Ennis Davis | Fr |

Special teams

| Pos. | # | Name | Class |
|---|---|---|---|
| K | 19 | Adam Abrams | So |

Head coach

- John Robinson

Coordinators/assistant coaches

- Keith Burns (defensive coordinator)

Legend

- (C) Team captain
- (S) Suspended
- (I) Ineligible
- Injured
- Redshirt

Roster
Last update: 1997-02-18

== Team players in the NFL ==
| Player | Position | Round | Pick | NFL club |
| Darrell Russell | Defensive tackle | 1 | 2 | Oakland Raiders |
| John Allred | Tight end | 2 | 38 | Chicago Bears |
| Matt Keneley | Defensive tackle | 7 | 208 | New York Giants |
| Chris Miller | Wide receiver | 7 | 213 | Green Bay Packers |
