= 1996 California Golden Bears football team =

American college football season

1996 California Golden Bears football

Aloha Bowl, L 38–42 vs. Navy
- Conference: Pacific-10 Conference
- Record: 6–6 (3–5 Pac-10)
- Head coach: Steve Mariucci (1st season)
- Offensive coordinator: Hue Jackson (1st season)
- Defensive coordinator: Tom Holmoe (1st season)
- Home stadium: California Memorial Stadium

1996 Pacific-10 Conference football standings
	Conf.			Overall
Team	W		L	W		L
No. 4 Arizona State $	8	–	0	11	–	1
No. 16 Washington	7	–	1	9	–	3
Stanford	5	–	3	7	–	5
UCLA	4	–	4	5	–	6
Oregon	3	–	5	6	–	5
California	3	–	5	6	–	6
USC	3	–	5	6	–	6
Arizona	3	–	5	5	–	6
Washington State	3	–	5	5	–	6
Oregon State	1	–	7	2	–	9
$ – Conference champion; Rankings from AP Poll

The 1996 California Golden Bears football team was an American football team that represented the University of California, Berkeley as a member of the Pacific-10 Conference (Pac-10) during the 1996 NCAA Division I-A football season. In their first and only year under head coach Steve Mariucci, the Golden Bears compiled an overall record of 6–6 record with a mark of 3–5 in Pac-10, placing fifth in the Pac-10, and were outscored by opponents 407 to 382. The team played home games at California Memorial Stadium in Berkeley, California.

The team's statistical leaders included Pat Barnes with 3,499 passing yards, Brandon Willis with 701 rushing yards, and Bobby Shaw with 888 receiving yards.

== Schedule ==
Date	Opponent	Rank	Site	TV	Result	Attendance	Source
September 7	at San Jose State*		Spartan Stadium; San Jose, CA		W 45–25	22,647	
September 14	San Diego State*		California Memorial Stadium; Berkeley, CA		W 42–37	37,000	
September 21	Nevada*		California Memorial Stadium; Berkeley, CA		W 33–15	38,000	
September 28	Oregon State		California Memorial Stadium; Berkeley, CA		W 48–42	34,000	
October 5	at No. 17 USC		Los Angeles Memorial Coliseum; Los Angeles, CA	ABC	W 22–15	51,511	
October 19	at Washington State	No. 19	Martin Stadium; Pullman, WA		L 18–21	27,182	
October 26	UCLA		California Memorial Stadium; Berkeley, CA (rivalry)		L 29–38	54,000	
November 2	Arizona		California Memorial Stadium; Berkeley, CA		W 56–55 ^{4OT}	35,000	
November 9	at No. 4 Arizona State		Sun Devil Stadium; Tempe, AZ		L 7–35	74,963	
November 16	at Oregon		Autzen Stadium; Eugene, OR		L 23–40	37,833	
November 23	Stanford		California Memorial Stadium; Berkeley, CA (Big Game)		L 21–42	70,500	
December 25	vs. Navy*		Aloha Stadium; Halawa, HI (Aloha Bowl)	ABC	L 38–42	30,411	
*Non-conference game; Rankings from AP Poll released prior to the game

== Rankings ==
Ranking movements Legend: ██ Increase in ranking ██ Decrease in ranking — = Not ranked
	Week																	
Poll	Pre	1	2	3	4	5	6	7	8	9	10	11	12	13	14	15	16	Final
AP	—	—	—	—	—	—	—	21	19	—	—	—	—	—	—	—	—	—
Coaches	—		—	—	—	—	—	22	21	25	—	—	—	—	—	—	—	—

== Roster ==
1996 California Golden Bears football team roster
Players
Coaches
Offense 79 Kursten Sheridan OT 6-6 290 JR 80 Brian Stumpf WR 6-3 180 FR 82 Ryan Horning TE 6-4 195 FR 84 Joel Young WR 6-2 175 FR 85 Eric Brandon TE 6-5 235 SO 87 Brian Surgener TE 6-4 215 FR 88 Phillip Pipersburg WR 5-10 170 FR

Pos.	#	Name	Class
WR	3	Bobby Shaw	Jr
WR	4	Na'il Benjamin	Sr
QB	18	Pat Barnes	Sr
TE	44	Tony Gonzalez	Jr
FB	45	Brent Malili	Sr
C	62	Jeremy Newberry	So
G	64	John Welbourn	So
OT	65	Brian Shields	Jr
OT	66	Todd Stewart	Sr
OT	77	Tarik Glenn	Sr
WR	81	Dameane Douglas	So
WR	83	Mike Baetta	Sr

Defense 47 Josh Trowbridge LB 6-4 225 SO 48 Brandon Whiting DT 6-3 280 JR 50 Fa'avae Fa'avae LB 5-9 205 FR 51 Rasheed Hibler LB 6-3 235 JR 52 Evan Collins DT-DE 6-5 280 SR 54 Sean Paga LB 6-1 215 FR 55 Justin Oakes LB 6-1 225 FR 90 Rashawn Davis DL 6-4 290 FR 92 Brent Jones DT 6-3 275 SR 96 John Romero DT 6-3 285 FR 97 Chris Easley DE 6-5 260 JR 99 Nate Geldermann LB 6-1 235 FR

Pos.	#	Name	Class
S	9	Marquis Smith	So
CB	24	Kato Serwanga	Jr
DE	33	John McLaughlin	Jr
DL	93	Zachary Sweet	Fr
DE	95	Jeremiah Parker	Fr
DE	98	Jerry DeLoach	Fr

Special teams

Pos.	#	Name	Class
P, PK	4	Ryan Longwell	Sr

Head coach

- Steve Mariucci

Coordinators/assistant coaches

Legend

- (C) Team captain
- (S) Suspended
- (I) Ineligible
- Injured
- Redshirt

Roster
