= 1996 UCLA Bruins football team =

American college football season

1996 UCLA Bruins football
- Conference: Pacific-10 Conference
- Record: 5–6 (4–4 Pac-10)
- Head coach: Bob Toledo (1st season)
- Offensive coordinator: Al Borges (1st season)
- Offensive scheme: Pro-style
- Defensive coordinator: Rocky Long (1st season)
- Base defense: 3–3–5
- Home stadium: Rose Bowl

1996 Pacific-10 Conference football standings
	Conf.			Overall
Team	W		L	W		L
No. 4 Arizona State $	8	–	0	11	–	1
No. 16 Washington	7	–	1	9	–	3
Stanford	5	–	3	7	–	5
UCLA	4	–	4	5	–	6
Oregon	3	–	5	6	–	5
California	3	–	5	6	–	6
USC	3	–	5	6	–	6
Arizona	3	–	5	5	–	6
Washington State	3	–	5	5	–	6
Oregon State	1	–	7	2	–	9
$ – Conference champion; Rankings from AP Poll

The 1996 UCLA Bruins football team represented the University of California, Los Angeles (UCLA) as a member of the Pacific-10 Conference (Pac-10) during the 1996 NCAA Division I-A football season. Led by first-year head coach Bob Toledo, the Bruins compiled an overall record of 5–6 with a mark of 4–4 in conference play, placing fourth in the Pac-10. UCLA played home games at the Rose Bowl in Pasadena, California.

The season was highlighted by the 25-yard Skip Hicks touchdown run in the second overtime that won the game for the Bruins over the crosstown-rival USC Trojans.

== Schedule ==
Date	Time	Opponent	Site	TV	Result	Attendance	Source
September 7	12:30 pm	at No. 2 Tennessee*	Neyland Stadium; Knoxville, TN	CBS	L 20–35	106,297	
September 14	7:00 pm	Northeast Louisiana*	Rose Bowl; Pasadena, CA		W 44–0	40,990	
September 28	12:30 pm	at No. 7 Michigan*	Michigan Stadium; Ann Arbor, MI	ABC	L 9–38	106,011	
October 5	3:30 pm	at Oregon	Autzen Stadium; Eugene, OR	FX	W 41–22	45,779	
October 12	12:30 pm	No. 4 Arizona State	Rose Bowl; Pasadena, CA	ABC	L 34–42	66,107	
October 19	3:30 pm	at No. 25 Washington	Husky Stadium; Seattle, WA	FSN	L 21–41	70,444	
October 26	3:30 pm	at California	California Memorial Stadium; Berkeley, CA (rivalry)	FSN	W 38–29	54,000	
November 2	3:30 pm	Stanford	Rose Bowl; Pasadena, CA (rivalry)	FSN	L 20–21	50,498	
November 9	12:30 pm	Washington State	Rose Bowl; Pasadena, CA	ABC	W 38–14	40,421	
November 16	12:30 pm	at Arizona	Arizona Stadium; Tucson, AZ	ABC	L 17–35	47,171	
November 23	12:30 pm	USC	Rose Bowl; Pasadena, CA (Victory Bell)	ABC	W 48–41 ^{2OT}	80,644	
*Non-conference game; Rankings from AP Poll released prior to the game; All times are in Pacific time

== Game summaries ==
=== USC ===
	1	2	3	4	OT	2OT	Total
Trojans	10	14	7	7	3	0	41
Bruins	0	7	14	17	3	7	48

UCLA scored 17 unanswered points in the final seven minutes, including two touchdowns in the final three minutes, to force overtime. After each team kicked a field goal in the first overtime period, the Bruins' Skip Hicks ran for a touchdown on the first play of the second period, and stopped USC to secure a sixth consecutive win for the Bruins over the Trojans.

== Roster ==
1996 UCLA Bruins football team roster
Players
Coaches
Offense

Pos.	#	Name	Class
WR	87	Danny Farmer	Fr
OT	71	Kris Farris	So
RB	42	Skip Hicks	Jr
WR	81	Tod McBride	So
WR	85	Jim McElroy	Jr
QB	18	Cade McNown	So
OT	69	Chad Overhauser	Jr
RB	33	Ryan Roques	So

Defense

Pos.	#	Name	Class
CB	35	Larry Atkins	So
LB	50	Brendon Ayanbadejo	So
DE	98	Travis Kirschke	Sr
S	9	Abdul McCullough	Sr
LB	97	Phillip Ward	Sr

Special teams

Pos.	#	Name	Class

Head coach

- Bob Toledo

Coordinators/assistant coaches

- Gary Bernardi (tight ends)
- Al Borges (offensive coordinator)
- Ron Caragher (wide receivers)
- Marc Dove (defensive backs)
- Bob Field (assistant head coach)
- Rocky Long (defensive coordinator/linebackers)
- Steve Marshall (offensive line)
- Skip Peete (running backs)
- Terry Tumey (defensive line/special teams)

Legend

- (C) Team captain
- (S) Suspended
- (I) Ineligible
- Injured
- Redshirt
