= 1996 Aloha Bowl =

American college football game

Navy Midshipmen	California Golden Bears
(8-3)	(6-5)
42	38
Head coach: Charlie Weatherbie	Head coach: Steve Mariucci
	1	2	3	4	Total
Navy	7	21	0	14	42
California	13	22	3	0	38
- Date: December 25, 1996
- Season: 1996
- Stadium: Aloha Stadium
- Location: Honolulu, Hawaii
- MVP: Chris McCoy
- Referee: David Witvoet (Big Ten)
- Halftime show: NCAA All-American Cheer and Dance Teams
- Attendance: 30,411

United States TV coverage
- Network: ABC

The 1996 Aloha Bowl was a college football bowl game played December 25, 1996, in Honolulu, Hawaii. It was part of the 1996 NCAA Division I-A football season. It featured the Navy Midshipmen, and the California Golden Bears.

The game started with California cornerback Deltha O'Neal taking the opening kickoff 100 yards for a touchdown, giving the Golden Bears a 6-0 lead, but the extra point was blocked. Navy answered with a 7-yard touchdown run from tailback Tim Canada taking a 7-6 lead with 6:21 remaining in the 1st quarter.

The Golden Bears retook the lead just 3 minutes later with a 6-yard touchdown pass from Pat Barnes to Bobby Shaw giving Cal a 13-7 lead. The Midshipmen answered with two scores in the opening 5 minutes of the second stanza giving the Midshipmen a 21-13 lead. Navy had scored on touchdown drives of 76 and 95 yards.

With 6 minutes to play in the first half, Cal quarterback Pat Barnes found wide receiver Sean Bullard for a 20-yard touchdown pass, and found Na'il Benjamin for the two-point conversion tying the game at 21. The Cal defense than forced a 3 and out, and Deltha O'Neal scored on a 31 yard wide receiver reverse giving the Golden Bears a 28-21 lead.

With just 39 seconds in the first half, Navy quarterback Chris McCoy threw a 2-yard touchdown pass tying the game at 28, but Cal answered with a 20-yard Pat Barnes strike to Bobby Shaw, giving Cal a 35-28 lead going into halftime.

The second half featured less scoring. In the third quarter, Ryan Longwell kicked a 41-yard field goal to give Cal a 38-28 lead. In the fourth quarter, with 8 minutes remaining, back up quarterback Ben Fay forever became a part of Navy Football lore as he came off the bench and led the first of 2 Navy 4th quarter drives first scored on a 3-yard touchdown run making the score 38-35. Cal drove deep into Navy territory, but turned it over at the Navy 16-yard line with 3 minutes left. Then with just 1:41 remaining in the game, Fay scored on the game winning 10-yard touchdown run, making the final 42-38 Navy.

The game was notable for its offensive output, with both teams putting up 1080 combined yards, an Aloha Bowl record. Navy rolled up 646 yards of total offense in the game. The first half featured 63 points being scored. Wide receiver Cory Schemm broke the bowl game record for receiving yards with 193 in the game.
