= Autzen Stadium =

Football stadium in Eugene, Oregon, U.S.

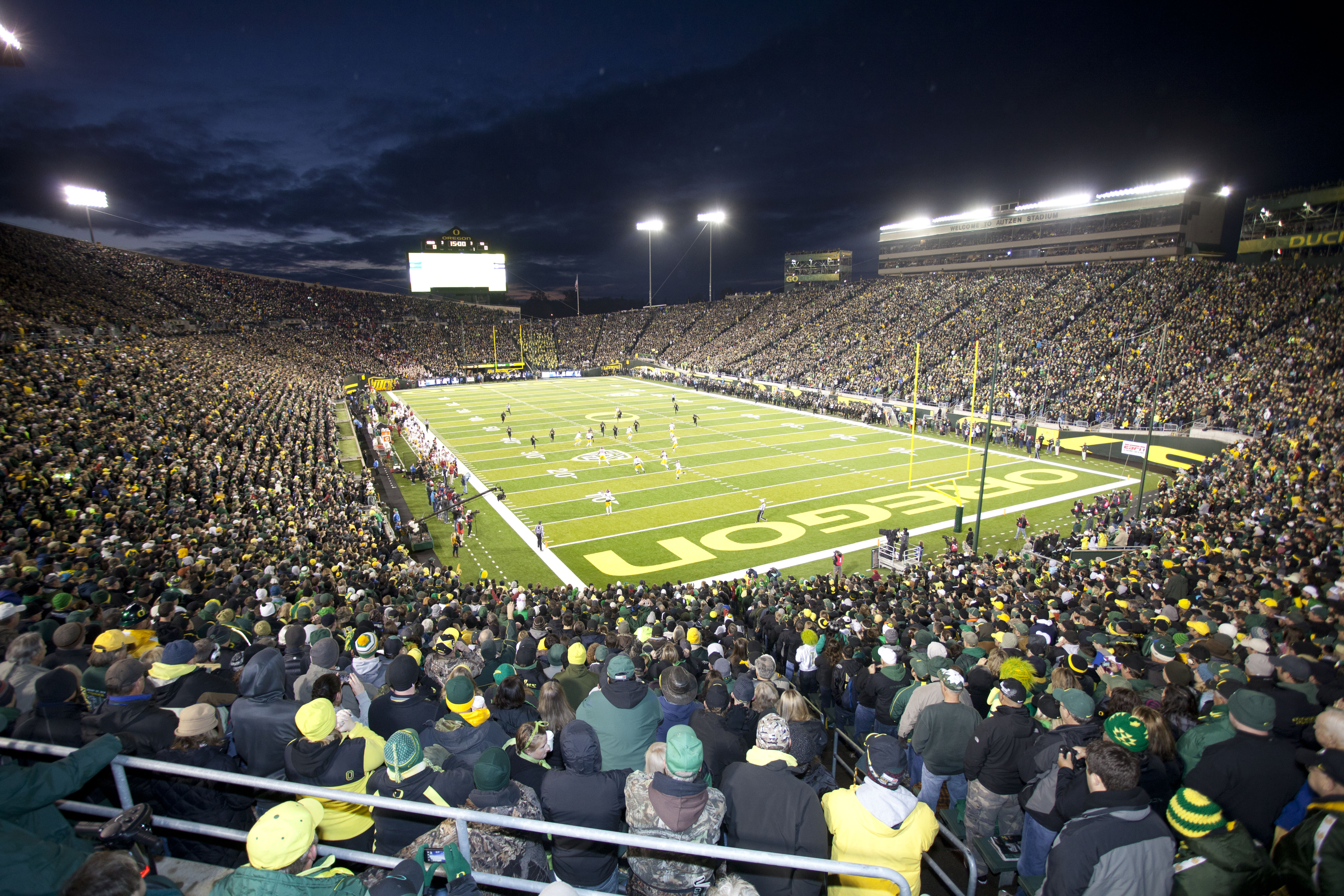
- Panoramic view during a game in 2011

- Location within the United States Location within Oregon
- Interactive map of Autzen Stadium
- Address: 2727 Leo Harris Parkway
- Location: Eugene, Oregon, U.S.
- Coordinates: 44°3′30″N 123°4′7″W
- Elevation: 420 feet (130 m) AMSL
- Owner: Oregon Ducks
- Operator: University of Oregon
- Capacity: 60,129 (2024–present) Former capacity: List: 41,698 (1988–2001); 41,097 (1969–1987); 41,078 (1967–1968)
- Surface: FieldTurf – (2012–present); NeXturf – (2001); OmniTurf – (1984–2000); AstroTurf – (1969–1983); Natural grass – (1967–1968)

Construction
- Groundbreaking: 1966; 60 years ago
- Opened: September 23, 1967
- Renovated: 2002
- Expanded: 2002
- Cost: $2.3 million $80 million (2002 renovation)
- Architects: Skidmore, Owings & Merrill; Ellerbe Becket (2012 renovation)
- General contractor: Gale M. Roberts Co. (1967)

Tenants
- Oregon Ducks football (NCAA) (1967–present)

Website
- goducks.com/stadium

Autzen Stadium is an outdoor football stadium in Eugene, Oregon, United States. Located north of the University of Oregon campus, it is the home field of the Oregon Ducks of the Big Ten Conference. Opened in 1967, the stadium has undergone several expansions. The official seating capacity is presently 54,000, with standing room to 60,000. However, actual attendance is regularly closer to the latter figure.

== History ==
Prior to 1967, the Ducks' on-campus stadium was Hayward Field, which they shared with the track and field team. However, by the late 1950s, it had become apparent that Hayward Field was no longer suitable for the football team. It seated only 22,500 people, making it one of the smallest in the University Division (now Division I), and only 9,000 seats were available to the general public. While nearly every seat was protected from the elements, it had little else going for it. The stadium was in such poor condition that coaches deliberately kept prospective recruits from seeing it. As a result, the Ducks only played three home games per year on campus in most years; with the exception of the annual rivalry game with Oregon State, games that were likely to draw big crowds (against schools like Washington and USC) were played 110 miles (180 km) north in Portland at the larger Multnomah Stadium. With the recognition that the football team had outgrown the campus facility and with popular support to play the entire home schedule in Eugene for the first time in school history, Oregon athletic director Leo Harris led a campaign to build a new stadium on 90 acres (0.36 km^{2}) on the north bank of the Williamette River that the school had acquired for the purpose in the 1950s on his recommendation.

School president Arthur Flemming was initially skeptical of the project, and asked Skidmore, Owings & Merrill to evaluate whether it was feasible to build a stadium on the north bank site, renovate Hayward Field, or build a new stadium on the Hayward footprint. The need for a new or expanded stadium had become acute with the implosion of the Pacific Coast Conference in 1959. Oregon had been left out of its successor, the Athletic Association of Western Universities (direct ancestor of the Pacific-12 Conference), and there was almost no chance of getting an invitation as long as the Ducks still played at Hayward Field. SOM concluded that the north bank site was the only feasible place for a stadium large enough to justify moving the entire home slate to Eugene. Hayward Field had not been built to code, which would have ruled out any possible expansion to 40,000-seats—thought to be the bare minimum capacity to allow all home games on campus. Its footprint was too small for a new stadium, and in any case the surrounding streets could not handle larger crowds.

Designed by SOM, the stadium was built within an artificial landfill (over the refuse) to eliminate the need for multilevel ramps. As a result, construction took just nine months and cost approximately $2.3 million. $250,000 was contributed by the Autzen Foundation, headed by Thomas E. Autzen (class of 1943), son of Portland lumberman and philanthropist Thomas J. Autzen (1888–1958), for whom the stadium was named. The elder Autzen was ironically an alumnus of Oregon archrival Oregon State University.

In 1967, Oregon hosted Colorado in Autzen Stadium's inaugural game, a 17–13 loss before 27,500 on September 23. Four weeks later on October 21, 16,000 saw Oregon's first win in the new facility; the 31–6 victory over Idaho was the only home win of the season.

The stadium alternates with Oregon State's Reser Stadium as host of the annual rivalry game with the Beavers.

Autzen hosted the inaugural Pac-12 Conference Championship game on December 2, 2011, as the Pac-12 North champion Ducks defeated the Pac-12 South champion UCLA Bruins.

=== Playing surface ===
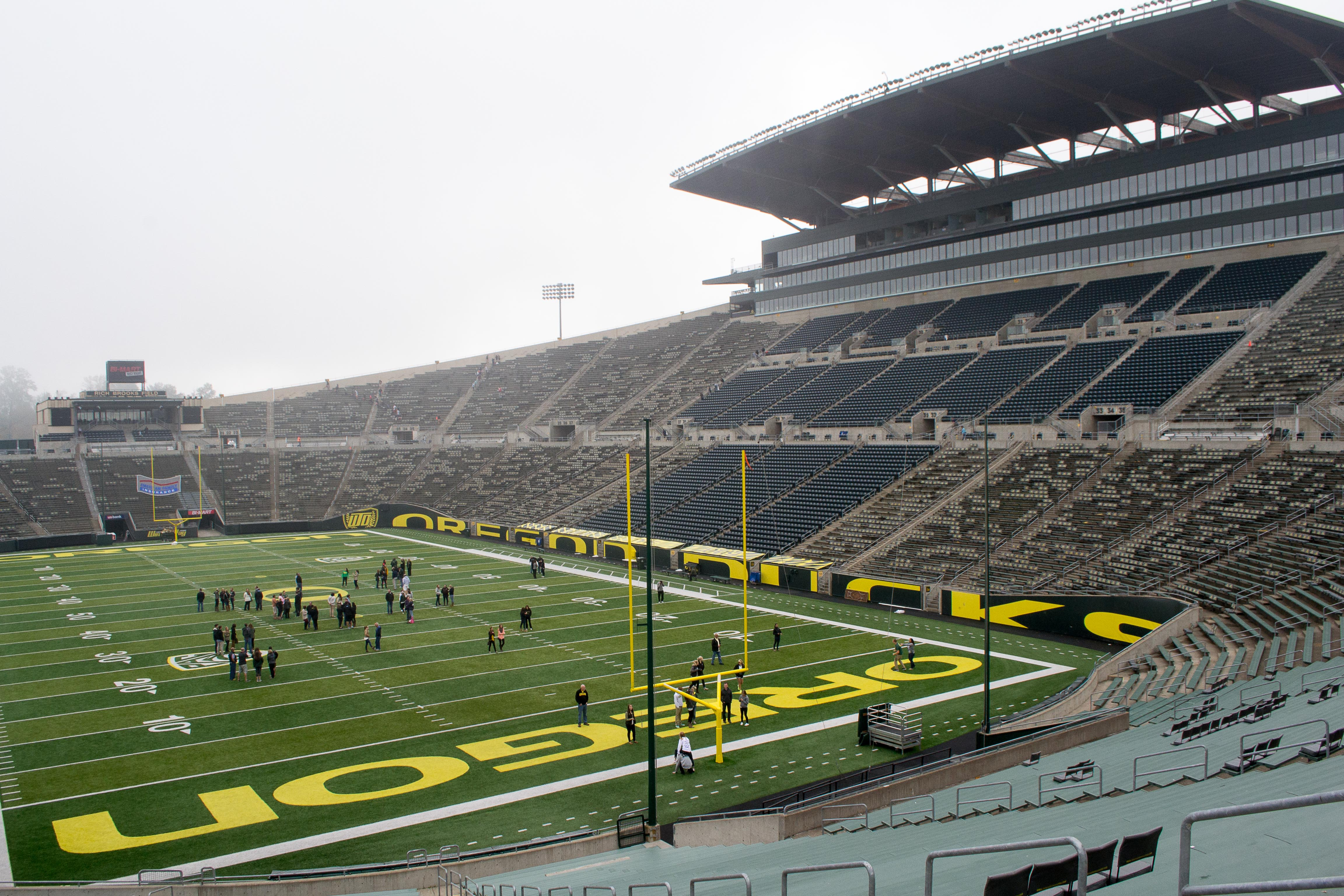
View of the field taken in 2013 after surface renovation

Opened with natural grass in 1967, the field was switched to AstroTurf and lights were added for its third season in 1969. After seven years, it was replaced with new AstroTurf in 1976. Sand-based OmniTurf was installed in 1984 and 1991, and infilled NeXturf in 2001. The NeXturf was found to be overly slick when wet and lasted only one season, and was transferred to an intramural field. FieldTurf made its debut in Autzen in 2002, and was replaced in 2010.

With up to 8 feet (2.4 m) of gravel fill underneath the field, the original crown of the natural grass field was moderate, with the center of the field approximately one foot (0.30 m) higher than the sidelines. The crown was removed in 2010, and the surface is now flat.

== Renovations ==
In 1982, a $650,000 meeting room complex, the Donald Barker Stadium Club, was opened on the east rim above the end zone. It gave the stadium its first meeting facilities, and was dedicated at the home opener in September.

A proposal to enclose the stadium within a dome was given serious consideration in 1985. New tax laws on contributions altered the feasibility, and the overall project was scaled back. In 1988, a $2.3 million renovation built a new press box on the south side of the stadium and converted the original north side press box to luxury suites. The renovation was designed by architecture firm Ellerbe Becket.

In 1995, the field was named Rich Brooks Field, after the Ducks' coach from 1977 to 1994. Brooks led Oregon to its first outright Pac-10 championship, and its first Rose Bowl appearance in 37 years, in his last season. Brooks left Oregon after the 1994 season to become head coach of the St. Louis Rams of the National Football League.

In 2002, a $90 million facelift and expansion added seating and luxury boxes to the south sideline, bringing the stadium seating capacity up to its current level.

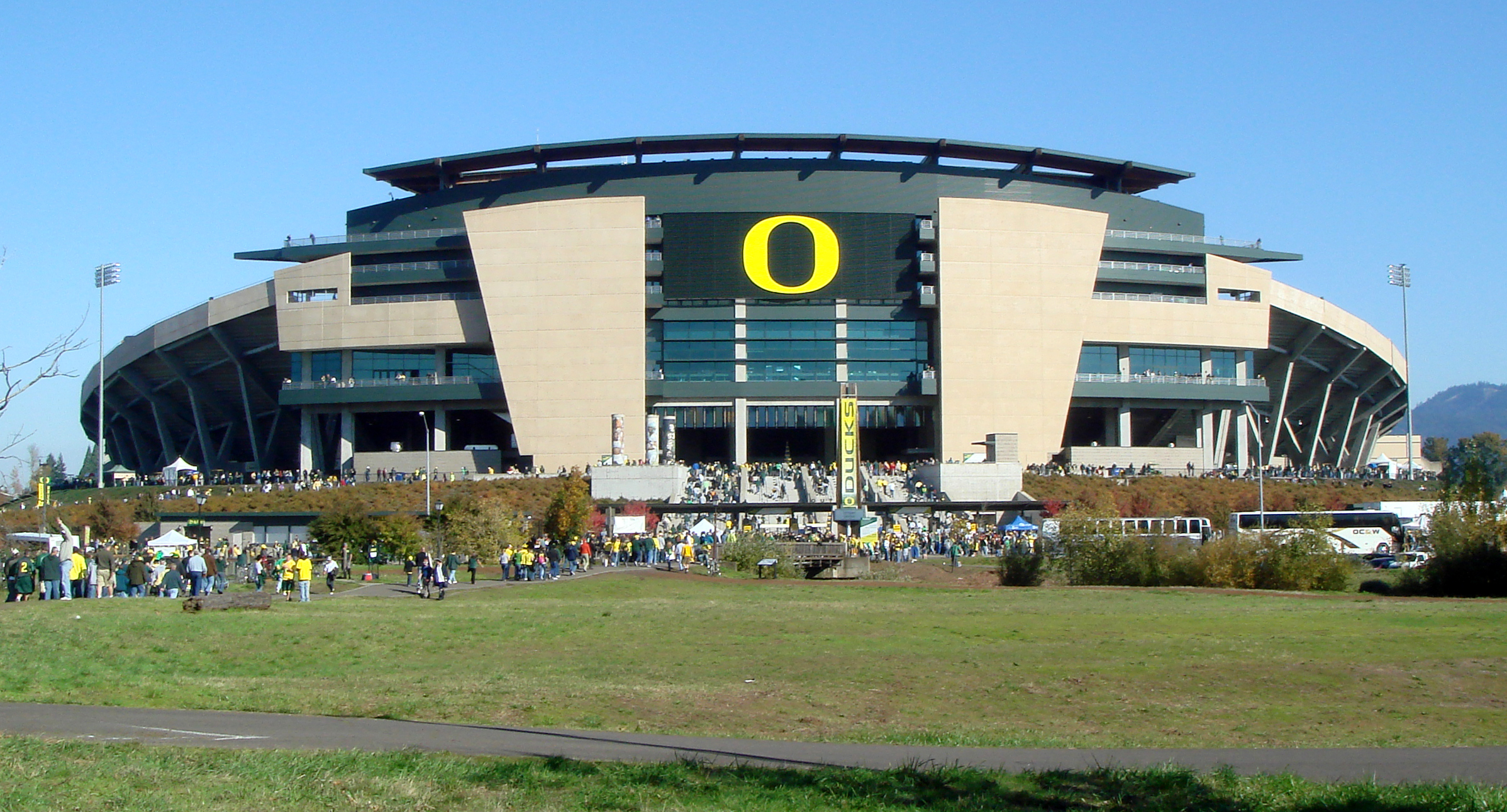
Exterior of the stadium in October 2007 displaying the large yellow "O"

In 2007, the large yellow "O" was added onto the south end of the stadium exterior when ESPN's College GameDay was on location. That season, "Gameday" originated two of its Saturday shows from Eugene.

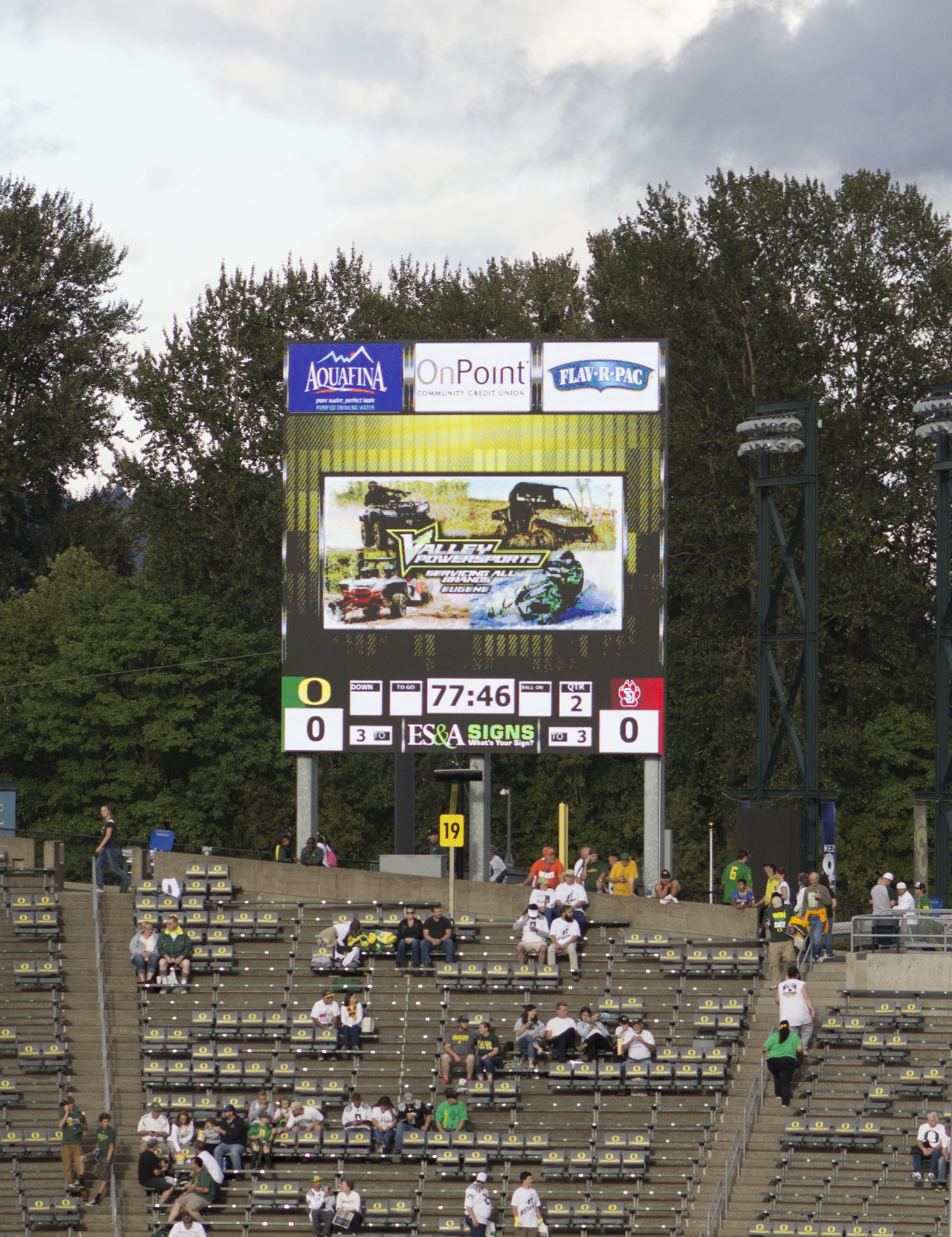
The digital scoreboard in the east end-zone in 2014

In 2008, a new, 33-by-85-foot (10 by 26 m) high-definition LED scoreboard and replay screen—known as DuckVision or "Duckvision 2.0"—was installed; it replaced the original video screen installed prior to the 1998–1999 football season. It is the 39th largest video screen in the NCAA.

In 2010, the field was replaced with new FieldTurf that featured the new Pac-12 logo (even before the logo was officially revealed to the public). During the process, the crown was removed to make the field flat. In addition, new paneling was added to the walls surrounding the field.

In 2014, the east end-zone scoreboard was updated to include a digital screen, the addition of 150 flat screen monitors throughout the concessions areas, additional culinary options in the form of food trucks on the north side of the stadium, increased cell phone repeaters and an upgrade to the sound system. Additionally, the sideline wall graphics were updated from the new panels installed in the 2010 season.

In 2020 the east end-zone scoreboard was replaced with a new 186’ x 66’ video screen on the east end of the stadium, making it the largest video board in college football. The video board will also house a smaller outward-facing 47’ x 26’ video board visible to fans arriving to the stadium.

== Stadium records ==
The highest attendance at Autzen was 60,129 on October 12, 2024, when the Ducks beat Ohio State, 32–31. This stands as the second largest crowd for a sporting event in the state of Oregon, with the largest being the CART Portland 200 IndyCar event in 1993, which claimed an estimated attendance of 63,000.

From 1997 to 2001, the Ducks had a 24-game home winning streak at Autzen Stadium, which ended with a 49–42 loss to Stanford.

In 2011, the USC Trojans defeated the Ducks 38–35, ending a 21-game home winning streak as the Trojans handed Chip Kelly his first loss at Autzen as head coach.

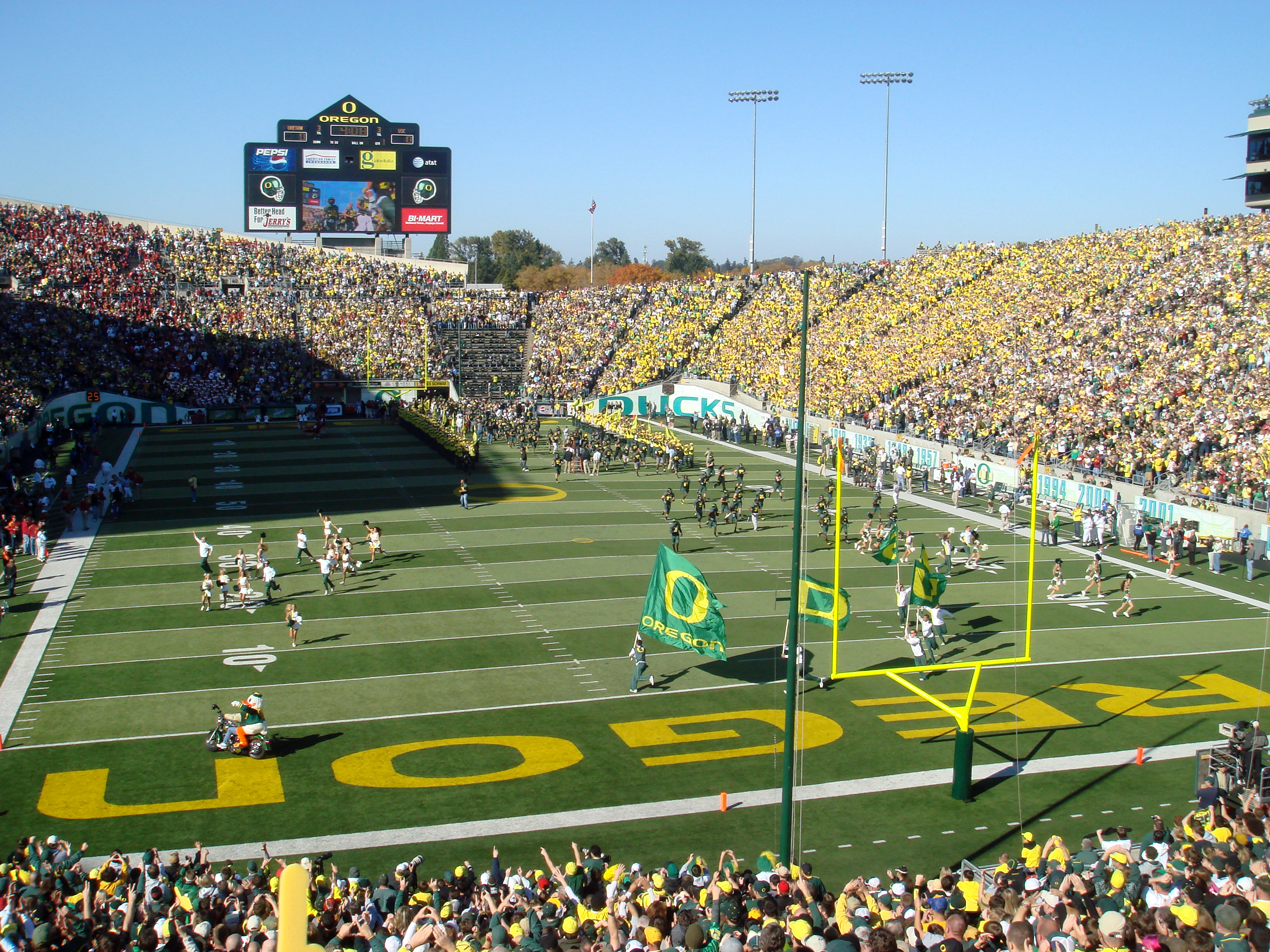
Taking the field against USC before 59,277 in 2007

	Opponent	Attendance	Rank	Date	Outcome	Note	Reference
1	#2 Ohio State	60,129	3	October 12, 2024	W 32–31	ESPN College Gameday	
2	#18 Arizona State	60,055	9	October 15, 2011	W 41–27	ESPN College Gameday	
3	Washington	60,017	1	November 6, 2010	W 53–16	Oregon–Washington football rivalry	
4	#21 Arizona	59,990	1	November 26, 2010	W 48–29		
5	#16 Oregon State	59,987	4	November 24, 2023	W 31–7		
6	#9 UCLA	59,962	10	October 22, 2022	W 45–30	ESPN College Gameday	
7	USC	59,957	6	November 11, 2023	W 36–27		
8	#18 USC	59,933	4	November 19, 2011	L 35–38		
9	#19 Colorado	59,889	4	September 23, 2023	W 42–6		
10	#20 Illinois	59,830	1	October 26, 2024	W 38–9		

== Attendance ==
Year	Head Coach	Capacity	Game 1	Game 2	Game 3	Game 4	Game 5	Game 6	Game 7	Game 8	Average	% of Capacity
1987	Rich Brooks	41,097	31,573 SDSU 25-20	44,421 #16 UW 29-22	39,587 USC 34-27	37,500 CAL 20-6	43,157 OSU 44-0				39,248	95.50%
1988	Rich Brooks	41,698	29,238 LBSU 49-0	39,089 STAN 7-3	28,015 IDST 52-7	45,978 #17 UW 17-14	34,588 ASU 21-20	42,509 UCLA 16-6			36,570	87.70%
1989	Rich Brooks	41,698	35,854 CAL 30-7	39,631 UA 16-10	44,963 WSU 51-38	31,381 LBSU 52-10	46,087 OSU 30-21				39,583	94.93%
1990	Rich Brooks	41,698	35,118 SDSU 42-21	29,637 ID 55-23	45,022 #4 BYU 32-16	32,554 USU 52-7	35,685 ASU 22-7	37,559 STAN 31-0	45,905 UCLA 28-24		37,354	89.58%
1991	Rich Brooks	41,698	42,995 WSU 40-14	45,948 USC 30-14	34,536 NMSU 29-6	41,949 STAN 33-13	42,141 OSU 14-3				41,514	99.59%
1992	Rich Brooks	41,698	32,560 HAW 24-21	28,361 TTU 16-13	29,287 UNLV 59-6	30,121 ASU30-20	47,612 UW 24-3	34,651 CAL 37-17	33,771 UCLA 9-6		33,766	80.98%
1993	Rich Brooks	41,698	28,361 MONT 35-30	40,935 USC 24-13	35,846 WSU 46-23	31,214 STAN 38-34	42,267 OSU 15-12				35,725	85.68%
1994	Rich Brooks	41,698	30,505 PSU 58-16	25,358 UTAH 34-16	29,287 IOWA 40-18	30,678 CAL 23-7	44,134 #9 UW 31-20	36,968 #11 UA 10-9	41,693 ASU 34-10		34,088	81.75%
1995	Mike Bellotti	41,698	44,201 ILL 34-31	45,237 STAN 28-21	38,736 PAC 45-7	46,109 WSU 26-7	44,772 ASU 35-24	46,114 OSU 12-10			44,195	105.99%
1996	Mike Bellotti	41,698	39,312 FSU 30-27 ^{OT}	41,606 NEV 44-30	39,605 COL.ST 35-28	45,779 UCLA 41-22	46,226 UW 33-14	40,721 UA 49-31	37,833 CAL 40-23		41,583	99.72%
1997	Mike Bellotti	41,698	38,035 UA 16-9	38,288 FSU 43-40	43,516 WSU 24-13	42,314 UCLA 39-31	39,389 UTAH 31-13	45,735 OSU 48-30			41,213	98.84%
1998	Mike Bellotti	41,698	43,634 #23 MICH.ST 48-14	41,868 SJSU 58-3	43,948 STAN 63-28	45,807 USC 17-13	46,031 UW 27-22	43,723 ASU 51-19			44,169	105.93%
1999	Mike Bellotti	41,698	40,938 UTEP 47-28	41,374 NEV 72-10	45,660 #16 USC 33-30 ^{3OT}	45,445 ASU 20-17	44,090 WSU 52-10	46,115 OSU 25-14			43,937	105.37%
2000	Mike Bellotti	41,698	43,371 NEV 36-7	43,770 ID 42-13	45,470 #6 UCLA^{3} 29-10	46,153 #6 UW 23-16	45,950 UA 14-10	45,845 CAL 25-17			45,093	108.14%
2001	Mike Bellotti	41,698	45,919 #22 WIS 31-28	45,712 UTAH 24-10	45,765 USC 24-22	45,258 UA 63-28	46,021 STAN 49-42	46,064 ASU 24-17	46,075 OSU 17-14		45,830	109.91%
2002	Mike Bellotti	54,000	56,386 MISS.ST 36-13	56,357 FSU 28-24	55,187 ID 58-21	56,066 PSU 41-0	56,432 ASU 45-42	56,754 USC 44-33	56,436 STAN 41-14	57,112 UW 42-14	56,341	104.34%
2003	Mike Bellotti	54,000	56,471 NEV 31-23	59,023 #3 MICH 31-27	57,473 WSU 55-16	57,627 STAN 35-0	57,511 CAL 21-17	58,102 OSU 34-20			57,701	106.85%
2004	Mike Bellotti	54,000	57,550 IU 30-24	57,912 ID 48-10	58,208 ASU 28-13	58,237 UA 28-14	58,101 UW 31-6	58,344 UCLA 34-26			58,058	107.51%
2005	Mike Bellotti	54,000	58,169 MONT 47-14	58,201 #23 FSU 37-34	59,129 USC 45-13	58,269 UW 45-21	58,309 #23 CAL 27-20 ^{OT}	58,525 OSU 56-14			58,433	108.21%
2006	Mike Bellotti	54,000	58,450 STAN 48-10	59,269 #11 OU 34-33	58,618 UCLA 30-20	57,493 PSU 55-12	58,408 UW 34-14	58,029 UA 37-10			58,377	108.11%
2007	Mike Bellotti	54,000	57,662 HOU 48–27	58,525 FSU 52–21	59,273 #6 CAL^{3} 24–31	58,749 WSU 53–7	59,277 #9 USC 24–17	59,379 #6 ASU^{3} 35–23	59,050 OSU 31–38^{2OT}		58,845	108.97%
2008	Mike Bellotti	54,000	58,778 UW 44–10	58,060 USU 66–24	58,713 BSU 32–37	58,728 UCLA 31–24	58,013 STAN 35–28	58,369 UA 55–45			58,443	108.23%
2009	Chip Kelly	54,000	57,772 PUR 38–36	58,017 #18 UTAH 31–24	58,975 #6 CAL 42–3	57,378 WSU 52–6	59,592 #4 USC^{3} 47–20	58,475 ASU 44–21	59,597^{1} #13 OSU 37–33		58,543	108.41%
2010	Chip Kelly	54,000	59,104 UNM 72–0	58,086 PSU 69–0	59,818 #9 STAN^{3} 52–31	59,372^{1} UCLA 60–13	60,017 UW 53–16	59,990^{2} #21 UA 48–29			59,397	110.00%
2011	Chip Kelly	54,000	58,818 NEV 69–20	58,874 MOSU 56–7	58,796^{1} CAL 43–15	60,055 #18 ASU^{3} 41–27	59,126 WSU 43–28	59,933 USC 35–38	59,802 OSU 49–21	59,376^{2} UCLA 49–31	59,344	109.90%
2012	Chip Kelly	54,000	56,144 AKST 57–34	55,755 FSU 42–25	57,091 TNTC 63–14	58,334 #22 UA 49–0	58,792 #23 UW 52–21	57,521 COLO 70–14	58,792 #14 STAN^{3} 14–17^{OT}		57,490	106.46%
2013	Mark Helfrich	54,000	57,769 NICH 66–3	57,895 TENN 59–14	56,987 CAL 55–16	56,949 WSU 62–38	59,206 #12 UCLA^{3} 42–14	56,481 UTAH 44–21	58,330^{2} OSU 36–35		57,659	106.78%
2014	Mark Helfrich	54,000	57,388 SDU 62–13	59,456 #7 MICH.ST^{3} 46–27	56,533 WYO 48–14	56,032^{1} UA 24–31	57,858 UW 45–20	58,974 STAN 45–16	55,898 COLO 44–10		57,488	106.46%
2015	Mark Helfrich	54,000	58,128 EWU 62–42	56,859 GSU 61–28	56,533 #18 UTAH 20–62	57,775 WSU 38–45^{2OT}	56,604 CAL 44–28	59,094 #22 USC 48–28	57,814 OSU 52–42		57,324	106.16%
2016	Mark Helfrich	54,000	53,817 UCD 53–28	53,774 UVA 44–26	53,974 COLO 41–38	58,842 #5 UW 70–21	53,898 ASU 54–35	53,757 STAN 52–27			54,677	101.25%
2017	Willie Taggart	54,000	52,204 SUU 77–21	58,389 NEB 42-35	55,707 CAL 45-24	56,653 #11 WSU 33-10	56,154 UTAH 41-20	51,799 UA 48-28	57,475 OSU 69-10		55,483	102.75%
2018	Mario Cristobal	54,000	50,112 BG 58-24	47,210 PSU 62-14	50,049 SJSU 35-22	58,453 #7 STAN^{3} 38-31^{OT}	58,691 #7 UW 30-27^{OT}	56,114 UCLA 42-21	50,485 ASU 31-29		53,016	98.8%
2019	Mario Cristobal	54,000	50,920 NEV 77-6	49,098 MONT 35-3	54,766 CAL 17-7	50,529 COLO 45-3	59,361 WSU 37-35	54,219 UA 34-6	56,243 OSU 24-10		53,591	99.2%
2020	Mario Cristobal	54,000	0 STAN 35-14	0 UCLA 38-35							N/A	N/A
2021	Mario Cristobal	54,000	43,276 FSU 31-24	42,782 SBU 48-7	50,024 UA 41-19	50,008 CAL 24-7	51,449 COLO 52-29	52,327 WSU 38-24	56,408 OSU 38-29		49,468	91.6%
2022	Dan Lanning	54,000	47,289 EWU 70-14	54,463 #12 BYU 41-20	52,218 STAN 45-27	59,962 ^{3}#9 UCLA 45-30	58,756 #25 UW 37-34	57,009 #10 UTAH 20-17			54,950	101.76%
2023	Dan Lanning	54,000	45,723 PSU 81-7	52,779 HAW 55-10	59,889 #19 COL 42-6	58,886 WSU 38-24	54,046 CAL 63-19	59,957 USC 36-27	59,987 #16 OSU 31-7		55,895	103.51%
2024	Dan Lanning	54,000	57,435 ID 24-14	58,134 BSU 37-34	59,802 MICH.ST 31-10	60,129^{3} #2OHIO.ST 32-31	59,830 #20 ILL 39-8	59,245 MD 39-18	59,603 UW 49-21		59,906	109.4%
2025	Dan Lanning	54,000	57,257 MSU 59-13	57,266 Ok.St 69-3	58,571 OSU 41-7	59,625 #7IU 30-20	58,940 WIS 21-7	58,830 MINN 42-13	59,588 #15USC 42-27	55,124^{4} #24JMU 51-34	58,150	107.7%
2026	Dan Lanning	54,000	57,652 BSU 34-27	58,114 PSU 84-0	59,262 UCLA 17-15	58,391 NEB 17-14	55,673 NU 38-26	58,183 MICH 31-7				

Sellout. Conference Championship Game. Attendance Record. 1 – Thursday Night Game. 2 – Friday Night Game. 3 – ESPN's College GameDay. 4 – CFP Home Game.

== Location and configuration ==
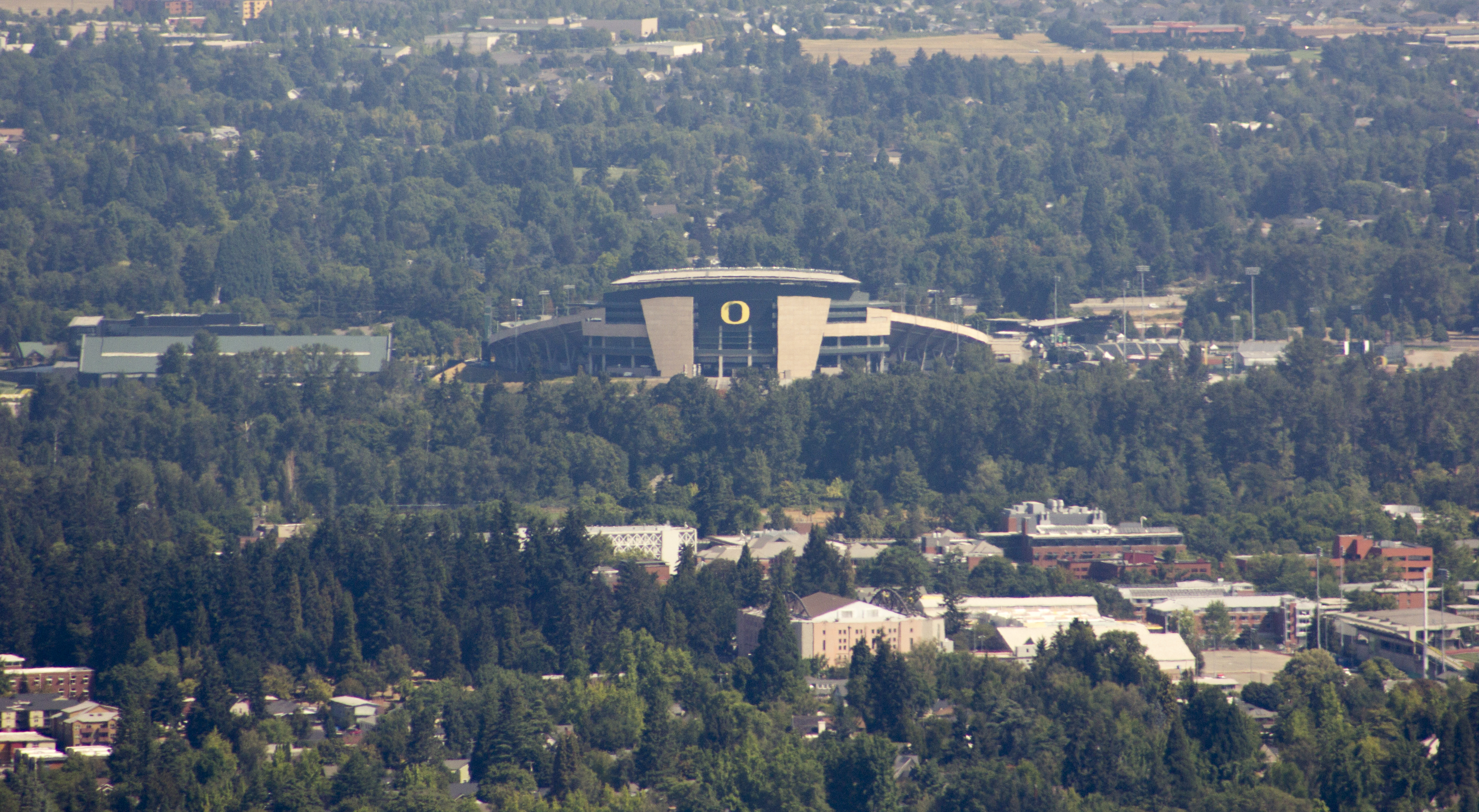
Autzen Stadium as seen from the summit of Spencer Butte

The stadium is located just north of the Willamette River, next to Alton Baker Park. Students typically walk to the stadium from the University of Oregon campus over the Autzen Footbridge, which passes over the Willamette, then through Alton Baker Park. The FieldTurf playing field is at an elevation of 420 feet (130 m) above sea level and is laid out in a non-traditional east-west orientation, slightly skewed so that players will not have the sun shining in their eyes in late fall.

== Crowd noise ==
Autzen is known for its crowd noise. Due to the stadium's relatively small footprint, the fans are very close to the action, and the field is sunken. These factors contribute to the loudness of the stadium even though it is smaller than other 'noise comparable' stadiums. According to many in the Pac-12, from Oregon's resurgence in the mid-1990s until the most recent expansion in 2002, Autzen was even louder because the noise reverberated all the way up the stadium and bounced back down to the field—the so-called "Autzen bounce." Oregon officials say that any future expansions will trap more noise.

On October 27, 2007, during a 24–17 victory against the USC Trojans, a then-record crowd of 59,277 fans was recorded at 127.2 decibels. A similarly loud 31–27 upset of third-ranked Michigan in 2003 prompted Michigan Daily columnist J. Brady McCollough to write

Autzen's 59,000 strong make the Big House collectively sound like a pathetic whimper. It's louder than any place I've ever been, and that includes The Swamp at Florida, The Shoe in Columbus, and Death Valley at Louisiana State. Autzen Stadium is where great teams go to die.

Michigan coach Lloyd Carr later said that Autzen Stadium was the loudest stadium he'd ever been in.

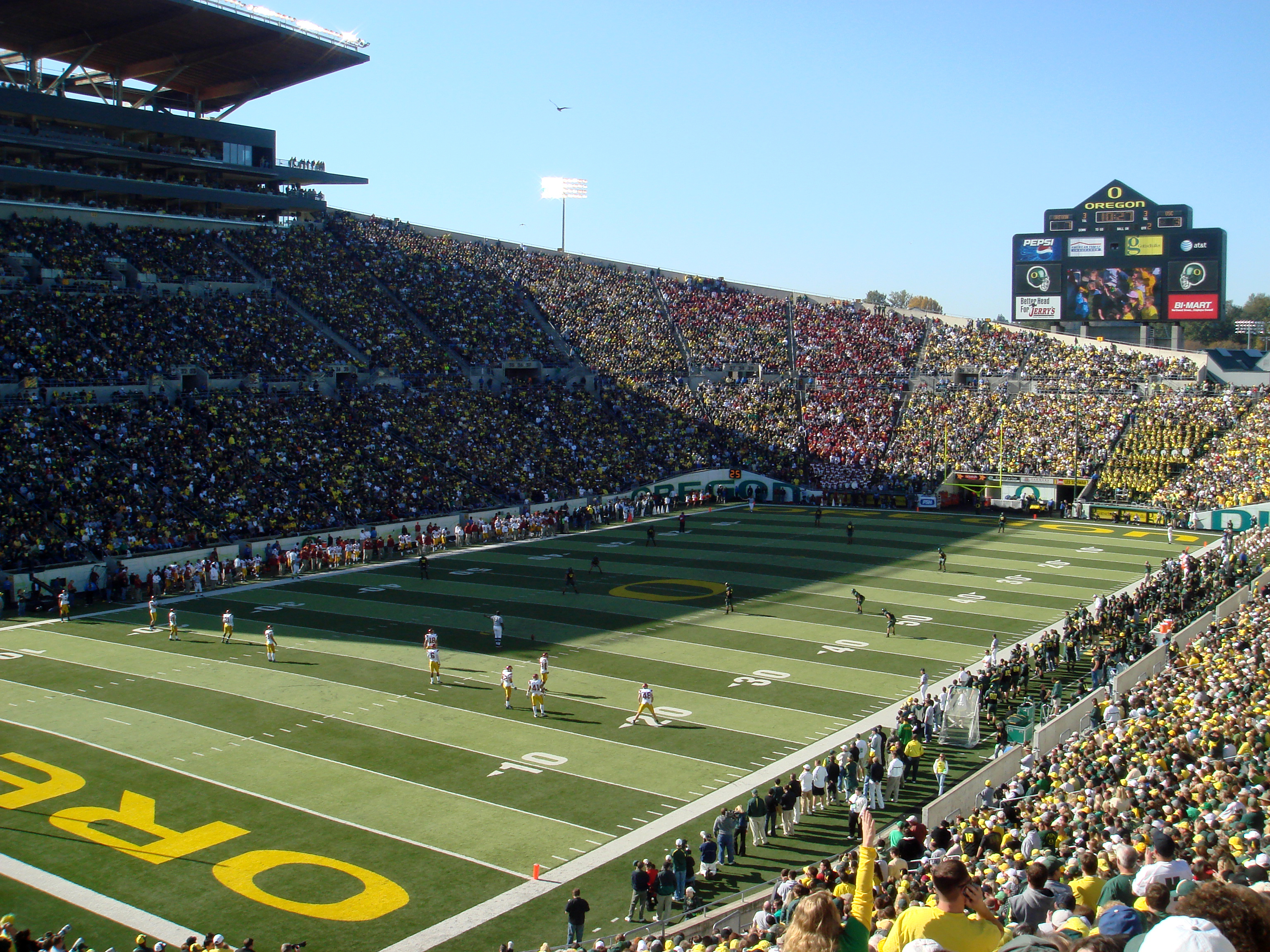
A view of the field during the 2007 USC game. The new press box on the south side, built in 2002, is visible to the left

In 2006, a Sporting News columnist named Autzen the most intimidating college football stadium in the nation.

Lee Corso of ESPN College Gameday frequently says, "Per person Autzen Stadium is the loudest stadium that I have ever been in my entire life!"

Longtime ABC sportscaster Keith Jackson called Autzen "Per square yard, the loudest stadium in the history of the planet."

Jahvid Best, a former starting running back for the Detroit Lions, visited Autzen while playing for the California Golden Bears in 2007. He later said, "The biggest thing I remember about that game is the crowd. The crowd noise is crazy up there. Honestly, any other away game I don't really even hear the crowd. Oregon was the only place where it really got on my nerves."

Following the September 6, 2014 game against the Michigan State Spartans, Michigan sports reporter Mike Griffin of MLive.com accused Oregon of piping in artificial noise that contributed to the Ducks' victory over the Spartans.

== Traditions ==
Since 1990, Don Essig, the stadium's PA announcer since 1968, has declared that "It never rains in Autzen Stadium" before each home game as the crowd chants along in unison. He often prefaces it with the local weather forecast, which quite often includes some chance of showers, but reminds fans that "we know the real forecast..." or "let's tell our friends from (visiting team name) the real forecast..." If rain is actually falling before the game, Essig will often dismiss it as "a light drizzle", or "liquid sunshine" but not actual rain by Oregon standards. Between the first and second quarter, the song "Coming Home" by Eugene native Mat Kearney is played. Although Kearney did not attend the school, the song references the state and the music video was filmed in the stadium. Also, because of the use of Autzen Stadium and the University of Oregon campus in National Lampoon's Animal House, the toga party scene of the movie featuring the song "Shout" is played at the end of the third quarter, with the crowd dancing to the song.

Prior to the football team taking the field, a highlight video of previous games is shown on the jumbotron, nicknamed "Duckvision". The last highlight on the clip is almost always Kenny Wheaton's game-clinching 97-yard interception return for a touchdown against the Washington Huskies in 1994. "The Pick" is often seen as the turning point for Oregon football, which went on to the Rose Bowl that year and have enjoyed success for the most part ever since after years of losing records.

After the video, the team takes the field behind a motorcycle with the Oregon Duck riding on back to the strains of Mighty Oregon. This is followed by the north side of the stadium chanting "GO" with the south side chanting "DUCKS!".

After every Duck score and win, a train horn blares. In addition, the Oregon Duck mascot does as many pushups as Oregon has points at that time.

== ESPN College Gameday ==
ESPN's College GameDay program came to Eugene for games played in Autzen Stadium six straight years, from 2009 through 2014, the most of any other school during that period. Overall, GameDay has made thirteen visits to Oregon, most recently in 2025 against the USC Trojans, and the Ducks have been a part of 34 GameDay broadcasts, either at Autzen or as a visiting team. Oregon has the tenth most appearances, posting a 19–12 (.613) record.

== Other uses ==
Autzen Stadium is the largest sports arena in the state of Oregon. In 1970, the San Francisco 49ers defeated the Denver Broncos 23-7 in an exhibition game at Autzen Stadium in front of a crowd of 26,238.

State high school football championship games were played at Autzen Stadium until 2006. It also hosts football camps, coaches' clinics, marching band competitions, and musical concerts.

Nitro Circus Live was held at the stadium in 2016 and 2018.

=== Concerts ===
The Grateful Dead used the stadium as a tour stop ten times between 1978 and 1994, including a 1987 show with Bob Dylan during which a portion of their collaborative live album entitled Dylan & the Dead was recorded.

Date	Artist	Opening act(s)	Tour / Concert name	Attendance	Revenue	Notes
August 8, 1970	Chambers Brothers	American Frog, Buddy Miles, Notary Sojac, Ouroborus		4,500		Benefit for YMCA
June 4, 1971	Doobie Brothers	Mother Earth, Ouroborus				Benefit for YMCA
June 25, 1978	Grateful Dead, Santana	Eddie Money, The Outlaws	Oregon Music Harvest No. 1	48,713	$512,236	
July 3, 1981	Blue Öyster Cult	Heart, Loverboy, Pat Travers, The Heat	Oregon Jam 1981	35,000		
July 25, 1982	Foreigner	Blue Öyster Cult, Joan Jett & The Blackhearts, Loverboy, Taxxi	Oregon Jam 1982	39,939		
July 16, 1983	Loverboy	Triumph, Joan Jett & the Blackhearts, Night Ranger, Quiet Riot	Oregon Jam 1983			
August 21, 1983	Journey	Sammy Hagar, Bryan Adams, Sequel	Frontiers Tour	24,978		
July 19, 1987	Grateful Dead & Bob Dylan		Bob Dylan and the Grateful Dead 1987 Tour			
August 28, 1988	Grateful Dead	Jimmy Cliff & Robert Cray		30,000		
June 22, 23 1990	Grateful Dead	Little Feat		36,000		
August 21, 22, 1993	Grateful Dead	Indigo Girls	Grateful Dead Summer Tour 1993	43,000		
June 17,18, 19, 1994	Grateful Dead	Cracker	Grateful Dead Summer Tour 1994			
May 6, 1997	U2	Rage Against the Machine	PopMart Tour	25,931 / 35,000	$1,293,540	
June 30, 2018	Dead & Company		Dead & Company Summer Tour 2018	36,436 / 36,436	$1,921,089	
June 29, 2019	Garth Brooks	Brooke Eden	The Garth Brooks Stadium Tour	60,000 / 60,000		
July 25, 2026	Zach Bryan	Alabama Shakes & Fey Fili	With Heaven on Tour			

=== In Film ===
It was also used as the location for the fictional Faber College football stadium in the 1978 movie, National Lampoon's Animal House. There is a well-known geographical error made during a scene set inside the stadium when Pacific-10 conference banners can clearly be seen in the background, even though the fictional Faber College is supposed to be located in Tennessee as shown by the state flag in the hearing room for the Delta House probation case.

=== Soccer ===
On July 24, 2016, Autzen Stadium hosted a 2016 International Champions Cup match between Inter Milan and Paris Saint-Germain, which was won by Paris Saint-Germain by a score of 3-1.

Date	Winning Team	Result	Losing Team	Tournament	Spectators
July 24, 2016	(France) Paris Saint-Germain	3–1	(Italy) Inter Milan	2016 International Champions Cup	24,147

== See also ==
- List of NCAA Division I FBS football stadiums
