= Jason McEndoo =

American football player and coach (born 1975)

Current position
- Title: Senior Offensive Line Analyst
- Team: Texas
- Conference: SEC

Biographical details
- Born: February 25, 1975 (age 51); San Diego, California, U.S.

Playing career
- 1995–1998: Washington State
- 1998: Seattle Seahawks
- 1999: Berlin Thunder
- 1999: Seattle Seahawks
- 2000: New Orleans Saints
- Position: center

Coaching career (HC unless noted)
- 2000–2001: Lake Washington High School (OL)
- 2002: Mt. Spokane High School (OL)
- 2003–2014: Montana State (OL)
- 2015–2025: Oklahoma State (TE/Cowboy Backs)
- 2025–present: Texas (Analyst)

Accomplishments and honors

Awards
- Second-team All-Pac-10 (1997)

Jason McEndoo (born February 25, 1975) is an American football coach and former center in the National Football League (NFL) for the Seattle Seahawks. He is currently a football analyst for Texas. He played college football at Washington State University in Pullman and was a member of the 1997 team which went to the Rose Bowl.

Born in San Diego, California, McEndoo played high school football in southwest Washington at Aberdeen. Selected in the seventh round of the 1998 NFL draft, McEndoo played one game for Seattle in his rookie season in 1998; he was released the following summer on September 5, 1999.

Married for less than a month in 1996, McEndoo and his wife Michelle were passengers in a rollover accident in which she was killed. The vehicle was driven by teammate Ryan McShane, who apparently fell asleep. The three were returning to Pullman after attending a teammate's wedding in Tacoma, and occurred on Interstate 90, near Ellensburg.
