= 1996 Oregon State Beavers football team =

American college football season

1996 Oregon State Beavers football
- Conference: Pacific-10 Conference
- Record: 2–9 (1–7 Pac-10)
- Head coach: Jerry Pettibone (6th season)
- Offensive coordinator: Denny Schuler (1st season)
- Offensive scheme: Multiple
- Defensive coordinator: Bronco Mendenhall (1st season)
- Base defense: 3–3–5
- Home stadium: Parker Stadium

1996 Pacific-10 Conference football standings
	Conf.			Overall
Team	W		L	W		L
No. 4 Arizona State $	8	–	0	11	–	1
No. 16 Washington	7	–	1	9	–	3
Stanford	5	–	3	7	–	5
UCLA	4	–	4	5	–	6
Oregon	3	–	5	6	–	5
California	3	–	5	6	–	6
USC	3	–	5	6	–	6
Arizona	3	–	5	5	–	6
Washington State	3	–	5	5	–	6
Oregon State	1	–	7	2	–	9
$ – Conference champion; Rankings from AP Poll

The 1996 Oregon State Beavers football team represented Oregon State University as a member of the Pacific-10 Conference (Pac-10) during the 1996 NCAA Division I-A football season. Led by Jerry Pettibone in his sixth and final season as head coach, the Beavers compiled an overall record of 2–9 with a mark of 1–7 in conference play, placing last out of ten teams in the Pac-10, and were outscored by opponents 388 to 216. It was the program's 26th consecutive losing season, and the 388 points allowed were the most by an Oregon State team since the 1987 season. The team played home games at Parker Stadium in Corvallis, Oregon.

Pettibone resigned at the end of the season, in late November, and was succeeded by Mike Riley.

== Schedule ==
Date	Time	Opponent	Site	TV	Result	Attendance	Source
September 7	1:00 pm	Montana*	Parker Stadium; Corvallis, OR		L 14–35	28,166	
September 14	3:30 pm	at No. 16 USC	Los Angeles Memorial Coliseum; Los Angeles, CA	FSN	L 17–46	48,069	
September 21	12:30 pm	at Baylor*	Floyd Casey Stadium; Waco, TX	ABC	L 10–42	42,327	
September 28	12:30 pm	at California	California Memorial Stadium; Berkeley, CA		L 42–48	34,000	
October 12	1:00 pm	Washington State	Parker Stadium; Corvallis, OR		L 3–24	26,722	
October 19	1:00 pm	Stanford	Parker Stadium; Corvallis, OR		W 26–12	21,305	
October 26	7:00 pm	at Arizona	Arizona Stadium; Tucson, AZ		L 7–33	43,716	
November 2	1:00 pm	No. 4 Arizona State	Parker Stadium; Corvallis, OR		L 14–29	21,946	
November 9	12:30 pm	at No. 19 Washington	Husky Stadium; Seattle, WA		L 3–42	71,072	
November 16	1:00 pm	Northern Illinois*	Parker Stadium; Corvallis, OR		W 67–28	17,215	
November 23	1:00 pm	Oregon	Parker Stadium; Corvallis, OR (Civil War)		L 13–49	35,822	
*Non-conference game; Rankings from AP Poll released prior to the game; All times are in Pacific time

== Roster ==
1996 Oregon State Beavers football team roster
Players
Coaches
Offense

Pos.	#	Name	Class
QB	10	Tim Alexander	So
C	50	Aaron Koch	Fr
WR	85	Bradon Lafferty	Fr

Defense

Pos.	#	Name	Class
DT	55	Shawn Ball	Fr

Special teams

Pos.	#	Name	Class

Head coach

- Jerry Pettibone (6th year)

Coordinators/assistant coaches

Legend

- (C) Team captain
- (S) Suspended
- (I) Ineligible
- Injured
- Redshirt

Roster
Last update: 1996-12-20
