= 1996 Oregon Ducks football team =

American college football season

1996 Oregon Ducks football
- Conference: Pacific-10 Conference
- Record: 6–5 (3–5 Pac-10)
- Head coach: Mike Bellotti (2nd season)
- Offensive coordinator: Dirk Koetter (1st season)
- Offensive scheme: Spread
- Defensive coordinator: Rich Stubler (1st season)
- Base defense: 4–3
- Captain: Game captains
- Home stadium: Autzen Stadium

1996 Pacific-10 Conference football standings
	Conf.			Overall
Team	W		L	W		L
No. 4 Arizona State $	8	–	0	11	–	1
No. 16 Washington	7	–	1	9	–	3
Stanford	5	–	3	7	–	5
UCLA	4	–	4	5	–	6
Oregon	3	–	5	6	–	5
California	3	–	5	6	–	6
USC	3	–	5	6	–	6
Arizona	3	–	5	5	–	6
Washington State	3	–	5	5	–	6
Oregon State	1	–	7	2	–	9
$ – Conference champion; Rankings from AP Poll

The 1996 Oregon Ducks football team represented the University of Oregon as a member of the Pacific-10 Conference (Pac-10) during the 1996 NCAA Division I-A football season. Led by second-year head coach Mike Bellotti, the Ducks compiled an overall record of 6–5 with a mark of 3–5 in conference play, placing in a five-way tie for fifth in the Pac-10. The team played home games at Autzen Stadium in Eugene, Oregon.

== Schedule ==
Date	Time	Opponent	Rank	Site	TV	Result	Attendance
August 31	7:00 pm	Fresno State*		Autzen Stadium; Eugene, OR	OSN	W 30–27 ^{OT}	39,312
September 7	1:00 pm	Nevada*		Autzen Stadium; Eugene, OR		W 44–30	41,606
September 14	1:00 pm	Colorado State*		Autzen Stadium; Eugene, OR		W 35–28	39,605
September 21	4:00 pm	at Washington State	No. 25	Martin Stadium; Pullman, WA	ABC	L 44–55	30,124
September 28	3:30 pm	at No. 6 Arizona State		Sun Devil Stadium; Tempe, AZ	FSN	L 27–48	54,618
October 5	7:15 pm	UCLA		Autzen Stadium; Eugene, OR	FSN	L 22–41	45,779
October 12	2:00 pm	at Stanford		Stanford Stadium; Stanford, CA (rivalry)		L 24–27 ^{OT}	41,150
October 26	12:30 pm	No. 23 Washington		Autzen Stadium; Eugene, OR (rivalry)	ABC	L 14–33	46,226
November 9	1:00 pm	Arizona		Autzen Stadium; Eugene, OR		W 49–31	40,721
November 16	3:30 pm	California		Autzen Stadium; Eugene, OR	FSN	W 40–23	37,833
November 23	1:00 pm	at Oregon State		Parker Stadium; Corvallis, OR (Civil War)		W 49–13	35,822
*Non-conference game; Rankings from AP Poll released prior to the game; All times are in Pacific time

== Rankings ==
Ranking movements Legend: ██ Increase in ranking ██ Decrease in ranking — = Not ranked
	Week																	
Poll	Pre	1	2	3	4	5	6	7	8	9	10	11	12	13	14	15	16	Final
AP	—	—	—	—	25	—	—	—	—	—	—	—	—	—	—	—	—	—
Coaches	—		—	—	—	—	—	—	—	—	—	—	—	—	—	—	—	—
