= 1996 Sun Bowl =

American college football game

1996 Norwest Sun Bowl
Stanford Cardinal	Michigan State Spartans
(6–5)	(6–5)
Pac-10	Big Ten
38	0
Head coach: Tyrone Willingham	Head coach: Nick Saban
	1	2	3	4	Total
Stanford	7	14	10	7	38
Michigan State	0	0	0	0	0
- Date: December 31, 1996
- Season: 1996
- Stadium: Sun Bowl
- Location: El Paso, Texas
- MVP: QB Chad Hutchinson (Stanford)
- Referee: Bill Athan (WAC)
- Attendance: 42,271
- Payout: US$1,000,000 per team

United States TV coverage
- Network: CBS
- Announcers: Gus Johnson, Artie Gigantino, Scott Moore
- Nielsen ratings: 3.7

The 1996 Norwest Sun Bowl, played on December 31, 1996, featured the Stanford Cardinal and the Michigan State Spartans.

Stanford scored first following a lateral from running back Josh Madsen to Leroy Pruitt. The 78 yard play went for a touchdown, and set the day for a Stanford rout. In the second quarter, quarterback Chad Hutchinson threw an 8-yard touchdown pass to fullback Jon Ritchie for a 14–0 lead. Adam Salina scored on a 1-yard touchdown run before halftime to increase Stanford's lead to 21–0.

Kevin Miller added a 24-yard field goal in the third to give Stanford a 24–0 lead. Damon Dunn later scored on a 1-yard run moving the lead to 31–0. Stanford's final points came on a 6-yard return of a blocked punt for a touchdown, making the final score 38–0.

The two teams faced off again seventeen years later on January 1, 2014, in the 2014 Rose Bowl, but this time, Michigan State won 24–20.

For the first time since John Hancock Insurance declined to renew its naming rights agreement, which included title sponsorship of the Sun Bowl from 1986 and full naming rights from 1989 until 1993, the Sun Bowl carried title sponsorship. Norwest Bank agreed to become the bowl’s sponsor for 1996; the sponsorship continued after the company’s merger with and renaming to Wells Fargo Financial until 2003.
