= 1996 Washington State Cougars football team =

American college football season

1996 Washington State Cougars football
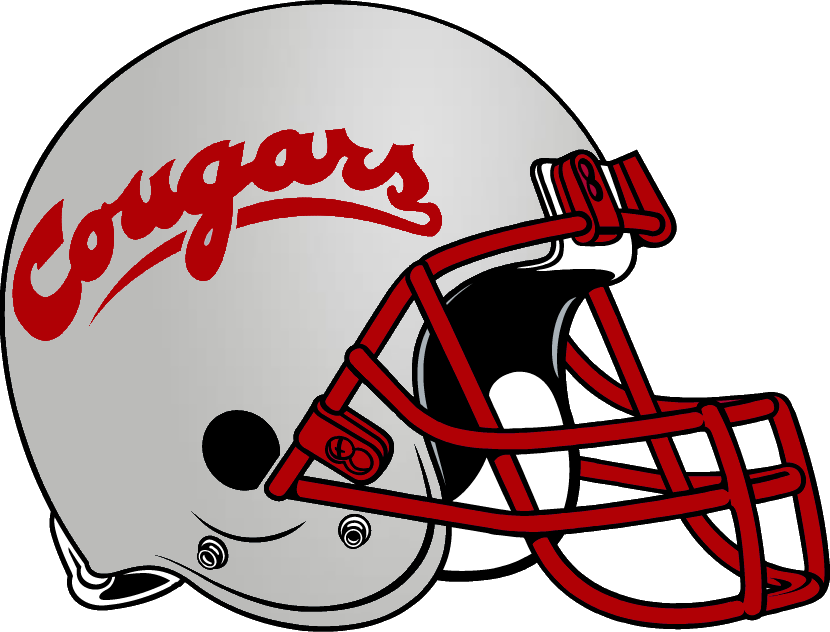
- Conference: Pacific-10 Conference
- Record: 5–6 (3–5 Pac-10)
- Head coach: Mike Price (8th season)
- Offensive coordinator: Jim McDonell (3rd season)
- Offensive scheme: Spread
- Defensive coordinator: Bill Doba (3rd season)
- Base defense: 4–3
- Home stadium: Martin Stadium

1996 Pacific-10 Conference football standings
	Conf.			Overall
Team	W		L	W		L
No. 4 Arizona State $	8	–	0	11	–	1
No. 16 Washington	7	–	1	9	–	3
Stanford	5	–	3	7	–	5
UCLA	4	–	4	5	–	6
Oregon	3	–	5	6	–	5
California	3	–	5	6	–	6
USC	3	–	5	6	–	6
Arizona	3	–	5	5	–	6
Washington State	3	–	5	5	–	6
Oregon State	1	–	7	2	–	9
$ – Conference champion; Rankings from AP Poll

The 1996 Washington State Cougars football team was an American football team that represented Washington State University in the Pacific-10 Conference (Pac-10) during the 1996 NCAA Division I-A football season. Led by eighth-year head coach Mike Price, the Cougars compiled a 5–6 record (3–5 in Pac-10, tied for fifth), and were outscored 317 to 314. In late October, Washington State was at 5–2 (3–1, Pac-10), but lost their final four games, all in conference.

The team's statistical leaders included Ryan Leaf with 2,811 passing yards, Michael Black with 948 rushing yards, and Kevin McKenzie with 626 receiving yards.

== Schedule ==
Date	Time	Opponent	Site	TV	Result	Attendance
August 31	12:30 p.m.	at No. 5 Colorado*	Folsom Field; Boulder, CO	ABC	L 19–37	51,481
September 14		at Temple*	Veterans Stadium; Philadelphia, PA		W 38–34	10,169
September 21	4:00 p.m.	No. 25 Oregon	Martin Stadium; Pullman, WA	ABC	W 55–44	30,124
September 28		San Jose State*	Martin Stadium; Pullman, WA		W 52–16	24,195
October 5	6:00 p.m.	at Arizona	Arizona Stadium; Tucson, AZ		L 26–34	47,405
October 12	1:00 p.m.	at Oregon State	Parker Stadium; Corvallis, OR		W 24–3	26,722
October 19	7:15 p.m.	No. 19 California^{†}	Martin Stadium; Pullman, WA	PSN	W 21–18	27,182
October 26	7:15 p.m.	USC	Martin Stadium; Pullman, WA	PSN	L 24–29	33,111
November 9	12:30 p.m.	at UCLA	Rose Bowl; Pasadena, CA	ABC	L 14–38	40,421
November 16	12:30 p.m.	at Stanford	Stanford Stadium; Stanford, CA		L 14–38	30,280
November 23	3:30 p.m.	No. 12 Washington	Martin Stadium; Pullman, WA (Apple Cup)	FX	L 24–31 ^{OT}	37,600
*Non-conference game; ^{†}Homecoming; Rankings from AP Poll released prior to the game; All times are in Pacific time

== Roster ==
1996 Washington State Cougars football team roster
Players
Coaches
Offense

Pos.	#	Name	Class
RB	6	Michael Black	Jr
WR	17	Chad Carpenter	Sr
G	68	Brian Chiu	Sr
TE	98	David Knuff	Sr
QB	16	Ryan Leaf	So
RB	4	Miguel Meriweather	So
C	76	Jason McEndoo	Jr
WR	9	Kevin McKenzie	Jr
OT	76	Ryan McShane	Jr
WR	45	Shawn McWashington	Jr
OT	72	Scott Sanderson	Sr
TE	87	Kevin St. Martin
WR	8	Shawn Tims	Jr
WR	18	Bryant Thomas	Jr
G	71	Cory Withrow	Jr

Defense

Pos.	#	Name	Class
DT	91	Leon Bender	Jr
DE	90	Dorian Boose	Jr
RB	24	Jason Clayton	So
LB	33	James Darling	Sr
DE	46	Shane Doyle	Jr
LB	34	Steve Gleason	Fr
FS	20	Derek Henderson	Sr
CB	3	Terrell Henderson	Sr
CB	15	Shad Hinchen	Sr
DB	2	Ray Jackson	Jr
LB	22	Brandon Moore	Jr
DT	93	Delmar Morais	So
LB	4	Johnny Nansen	Sr
SS	25	Duane Stewart	Jr

Special teams

Pos.	#	Name	Class
P	12	Jeff Banks	Jr
K	47	Tony Truant	Sr

Head coach

- Mike Price (8th year)

Coordinators/assistant coaches

- Jim McDonell – OC
- Bill Doba – DC

Legend

- (C) Team captain
- (S) Suspended
- (I) Ineligible
- Injured
- Redshirt

== NFL draft ==
Three Cougars were selected in the 1997 NFL draft.

Player	Position	Round	Overall	Franchise
James Darling	LB	2	57	Philadelphia Eagles
Scott Sanderson	T	3	81	Houston Oilers
Chad Carpenter	WR	5	139	New York Jets
