= Chad Hutchinson =

American football and baseball player (born 1977)

No. 7, 9
- Position: Quarterback

Personal information
- Born: February 21, 1977 (age 49); San Diego, California, U.S.
- Listed height: 6 ft 5 in (1.96 m)
- Listed weight: 237 lb (108 kg)

Career information
- High school: Torrey Pines (San Diego)
- College: Stanford (1995–1997)
- NFL draft: 2002: undrafted

Career history
- Dallas Cowboys (2002–2003); → Rhein Fire (2004); Chicago Bears (2004)

Career NFL statistics
- Passing attempts: 413
- Passing completions: 220
- Completion percentage: 53.3%
- TD–INT: 11–11
- Passing yards: 2,466
- Passer rating: 69.1 Baseball career
- Pitcher
- Batted: Right Threw: Right
MLB debut
- April 4, 2001, for the St. Louis Cardinals
Last MLB appearance
- April 17, 2001, for the St. Louis Cardinals
MLB statistics
- Win–loss record: 0–0
- Earned run average: 24.75
- Strikeouts: 2
- WHIP: 3.75
- Stats at Baseball Reference
Teams
- St. Louis Cardinals (2001)
- Stats at Pro Football Reference

Chad Martin Hutchinson (born February 21, 1977) is an American former professional football player who was a quarterback in the National Football League (NFL) for the Dallas Cowboys and Chicago Bears. He also is a former Major League Baseball (MLB) pitcher for the St. Louis Cardinals. He played college football for the Stanford Cardinal.

== Early life ==
Hutchinson started practicing football late in his life as a freshman in Torrey Pines High School. He was a two-year starter at outside linebacker that switched to quarterback as a senior, to take advantage of his mobility and arm strength. Even though he led a run oriented Wing T Offense, he recorded a 50% completion average, 1,441 passing yards and 8 touchdowns.

He was a rare two-sport standout, that also showed the talent to play professional baseball after his fastball was clocked at 94-mph. As a senior, he finished with an 11–0 record, a 1.20 earned-run average, 116 strikeouts and earned the Gatorade National Baseball Player-of-the-Year award.

== College career ==
Hutchinson accepted a football scholarship from Stanford University over professional baseball. In 1996 as a redshirt freshman, he was named the starting quarterback over senior Tim Carey. He started slowly, but improved during the season. He suffered a sprained thumb in week seven's 41–9 loss against Arizona State University, forcing him to miss practice the week leading up to the game against UCLA. He was still able to guide Stanford on an 80-yard drive in the final minutes to pull off a 21–20 win, where he was seven-of-seven, culminating on a 10-yard touchdown pass to Brian Manning with 0:58 seconds remaining in the contest. His best game was the 38–0 win in the 1996 Sun Bowl against Michigan State University, where he earned Most Valuable Player honors after completing 22 out of 28 passes for 226 yards and one touchdown. He finished the season with 11 starts, 190 out of 312 completions for 2,134 yards, 10 touchdowns and 12 interceptions.

As a sophomore, he started 11 games, completing 189 out of 315 passes for 2,101 yards, 10 touchdowns and 10 interceptions. In the season opener against San Jose State University, he completed 18 out of 36 passes for 302 yards and one touchdown. In the 58–49 win against the University of Oregon, he completed 21 out of 31 passes for 340 yards and tied a school record with 4 touchdowns. In the tenth game against Washington State University he only had one play before leaving with an injured right thumb. In the season finale 21–20 win against the University of California, he completed 21 out of 25 passes for 194 yards and one touchdown.

In July 1998, he left school with two seasons of eligibility remaining, in order to play professional baseball with the St. Louis Cardinals. In two seasons he threw for 4,235 yards, 20 touchdowns and 22 interceptions in 23 starts. At the time he ranked seventh All-time in the school's career passing list, fifth in career completion percentage, seventh in career completions, eighth in career attempts, ninth in total offense and eleventh in career touchdown passes. Scouts considered him to be a potential first-round draft choice in the NFL draft.

His development in football came without the benefit of spring practice, because he also was a starting pitcher for the Stanford Cardinal baseball team. In the spring of 1996, he played as a true freshman and was named the number two starter in the pitching rotation. He compiled a 7–2 record, 70 strikeouts (tied for sixth in the Pac-10) and a 3.51 ERA (fourth in the Pac-10). He also ranked among the league leaders in complete games (4), innings pitched (842) and strikeouts per-nine-innings (7.5). He helped the team finish with a 41–19 record, a second place in the Pac-10 and an appearance in the NCAA West Regional. He received first-team Freshman All-American and honorable-mention All-Pac-10 honors.

As a sophomore, his 8–3 record and 110 strikeouts, helped the team reach the 1997 College World Series. As a junior, he had a 10–5 record, making 115 strikeouts in 99.1 innings. He compiled a career record of 25–11 and ranked eighth all-time in school history in wins and sixth in strikeouts with 299. His career ERA was 4.80. He contributed to the team winning the Pac-10 Southern Division championship in 1997 and 1998.

== Baseball career ==
Although Hutchinson had signed a letter of intent to attend Stanford University and was asking for a $1.5 million signing bonus (at the time one of the biggest bonus ever by a draftee), he was still selected 26th overall in the first round because of his potential, after being drafted by the Atlanta Braves in the 1995 Major League Baseball draft. He decided to attend college, even after the Braves met most of his demands.

He was selected in the second round (48th overall) of the 1998 Major League Baseball draft by the St. Louis Cardinals. In July 1998, he signed a four-year, $3.5 million contract ($2.4 million signing bonus and a $1.1 million four-year guaranteed contract) to forgo the NFL and play exclusively baseball. He began his professional career with the Class-A New Jersey Cardinals, registering an 0–1 record in 3 starts. He was promoted to the Class-A Advanced Prince William Cannons on August 15. He made five starts, going 2–0 with a 2.79 ERA and earning his first professional win against Salem on August 21, after pitching six innings and allowing two solo homers with a walk and six strikeouts.

In 1999, he completed his first full professional season with a combined 9–11 record between the Arkansas Travelers (AA) and the Memphis Redbirds (AAA). He spent most of the season at Arkansas, where he was 7–11 with a 4.72 ERA in 25 starts. He tied for the team lead in wins (seven) and finished second with 150 strikeouts in 141 innings pitched. He struck out 10 or more in three of his starts and was a part of three combined shutouts. He allowed just one hit and had 11 strikeouts in 8 innings pitched during a win at Shreveport (8/6), leading to his selection as Texas League Pitcher for the week ending August 8. On August 27, he was promoted to Memphis and made two starts, going 2–0 with a 2.19 ERA. He earned a win at Vancouver by striking out 11 in 6 innings. On September 27, he was recalled by the St. Louis Cardinals but did not appear in any games.

In 2000, he struggled through an injury-plagued campaign in which he split time between the Memphis Redbirds (AAA) and the Arkansas Travelers (AA). He pitched only 56.1 innings on the year, posting 63 strikeouts and ranking eighth in the Cardinals organization with 10.1 strikeouts-per-nine innings pitched. He opened the season at Memphis, but got off to a bad start before being sent to Arkansas. He pitched well in 8 starts for the Travelers, allowing just one unearned run over 18 innings in one stretch, before being shelved with right elbow problems for more than two months. He returned to pitch three games at season's end, recording 15 strikeouts and 3 walks in 11 innings. He then played for the Scottsdale Scorpions in the Arizona Fall League.

In 2001, he opened the season on the Cardinals' major league roster and pitching 4 innings in three appearances, before being sent down to the Memphis Redbirds (AAA) on April 22. He remained the rest of the season in Memphis, producing a 4–9 record and a 7.92 ERA in 20 starts. He recorded 111 strikeouts in 97.2 innings and had a 3-game winning streak in July.

Hutchinson spent over four seasons in the Cardinals organization, moving mostly between Class A and Class AAA ball, while compiling a 17–25 record and a 5.63 ERA. He pitched in the Major Leagues in three games, all in relief, for the St. Louis Cardinals during the 2001 season. He did not fare well, giving up 16 base runners (nine hits, six walks, and one hit batsman) and 11 earned runs in just four total innings. His MLB career totals include an 0–0 record, two strikeouts (Ben Petrick and Denny Neagle), and an ERA of 24.75.

== Football career ==
=== Dallas Cowboys ===
Struggling after a stint in minor league baseball, Hutchinson decided to focus on professional football and held an open workout in 2002 that was attended by three teams (Dallas, Chicago and Kansas City). Expecting that he could regain his football form, the Dallas Cowboys won a bidding war for his services on January 26, signing him as an undrafted free agent to a contract that included a $3.1 million bonus, three years guaranteed at $5 million and a no-baseball clause.

In 2002, as a 25-year-old rookie, Hutchinson was named the starter after a struggling Quincy Carter lost to the Arizona Cardinals and engaged in a heated sideline argument with Cowboys owner and general manager Jerry Jones. Hutchinson's first start was the 17–14 loss to the Seattle Seahawks where Emmitt Smith broke the NFL all-time rushing record. His best game came against the Jacksonville Jaguars in a 21–19 victory, when he passed for 301 yards (most yards by a rookie since Troy Aikman in 1989) and 2 touchdowns. He finished with nine starts, completing 127 out of 250 attempts for 1,555 yards, 7 touchdown passes, 8 interceptions and set an NFL rookie record by throwing 95 straight passes without an interception to start a career (a record later broken in 2016 by Carson Wentz at 134, then by Dak Prescott at 176 in the same season).

In 2003, with the arrival of new head coach Bill Parcells, all positions were opened to competition, and Hutchinson became involved in a publicized quarterback controversy, when he and Carter competed for a roster spot in the 2002 edition of Hard Knocks, an HBO series that covers the training camp of an NFL team. Carter eventually regained the starting role, bringing stability to the quarterback position and leading the team to a 10–6 record and a playoff appearance. Hutchinson saw his only action of the season in the sixth game against the Detroit Lions, taking over for Carter for the final four drives (including kneel downs), completing one out of two passes for 8 yards.

In 2004, the Cowboys group of quarterbacks had expanded with the trade for yet another former baseball player (Drew Henson) and the acquisition of Vinny Testaverde off waivers, who was later named the starter after Carter was released on August 4. Hutchinson was waived on July 27. He finished his Cowboys tenure with a 2–7 record, 128 completions out of 252 attempts, 1,563 passing yards, 7 touchdown passes and 8 interceptions. He also became part of a succession of short-tenured quarterbacks following the retirement of Aikman, which included Carter, Randall Cunningham, Testaverde, Drew Bledsoe, Anthony Wright, Ryan Leaf, Henson and Clint Stoerner.

=== Rhein Fire ===
In 2004, the Cowboys allocated Hutchinson to the Rhein Fire of NFL Europe, so he could work on his accuracy and mechanics. He played inconsistently before suffering a sprained right shoulder in the week 8 contest against the Cologne Centurions, forcing him to miss the final 2 games and losing nearly a month rehabilitating it back to health. He had a 3–5 record, completing 126 out of 207 passes for 1,356 yards, 5 touchdowns and 4 interceptions.

=== Chicago Bears ===
On September 29, 2004, Hutchinson was signed as a free agent by the Chicago Bears, after Rex Grossman suffered a season-ending knee injury in the third game of the season, reuniting with quarterback coach Wade Wilson who also held that position with the Cowboys. He would become the fourth quarterback that year to start for the team, after Jonathan Quinn and Craig Krenzel were ineffective in their appearances.

Grossman was the projected starter entering the 2005 season, until suffering a broken ankle in preseason. Although Hutchinson was initially named the starter, he was eventually replaced in favor of rookie Kyle Orton, after he had poor preseason performances and the decision to sign Jeff Blake to be the backup. Following his demotion, he was released on August 31.

== Personal life ==
Hutchinson lives with his wife, 2 sons, and daughter in Dallas. His wife is the sister of former major league baseball player Todd Walker. His father Lloyd was an outfielder in the Philadelphia Phillies' farm system and his brother Trevor was a pitcher in the Florida Marlins organization.
