= John Fiala =

American football player (born 1973)

No. 57
- Position: Linebacker

Personal information
- Born: November 25, 1973 (age 52); Fullerton, California, U.S.
- Listed height: 6 ft 2 in (1.88 m)
- Listed weight: 237 lb (108 kg)

Career information
- High school: Lake Washington (Kirkland, Washington)
- College: Washington
- NFL draft: 1997: 6th round, 166th overall pick

Career history
- Miami Dolphins (1997)*; Pittsburgh Steelers (1997-2002)
- * Offseason or practice squad member only

Awards and highlights
- Second-team All-Pac-10 (1996)

Career NFL statistics
- Games played: 75
- Games started: 1
- Tackles: 9
- Fumble recoveries: 2
- Passes defended: 1
- Stats at Pro Football Reference

John Charles Fiala (born November 25, 1973) is an American former professional football player who was a linebacker with the Pittsburgh Steelers of the National Football League (NFL) from 1998 to 2002.

Fiala attended Lake Washington High School in Kirkland, Washington, and then played college football for the Washington Huskies. He was selected by the Miami Dolphins in the sixth round of the 1997 NFL draft, but did not play for the Dolphins. Fiala signed with the Steelers as a free agent in 1998. From 1999 to 2002, he was a special teams captain for the Steelers. The Steelers released Fiala in 2002; although the Houston Texans offered him a contract for 2003, he chose to retire instead.
