= Chris Miller (wide receiver) =

American football player (born 1973)

Chris Miller (born July 10, 1973) is a former American football wide receiver in the Arena Football League (AFL) who played for the Buffalo Destroyers. He played college football for the USC Trojans. He also played in NFL Europe for the Scottish Claymores.

He is a cousin of Keyshawn Johnson and the two were teammates at USC.
