= California Golden Bears football statistical leaders =

The California Golden Bears football statistical leaders are individual statistical leaders of the California Golden Bears football program in various categories, including passing, rushing, receiving, total offense, defensive stats, and kicking. Within those areas, the lists identify single-game, single-season, and career leaders. The Golden Bears represent the University of California, Berkeley (also Cal) in the NCAA Division I FBS Atlantic Coast Conference (ACC).

Although California began competing in intercollegiate football in 1886, the school's official record book generally does not include entries from before the 1940s, as records from earlier times are often incomplete and inconsistent.

These lists are dominated by more recent players for several reasons:

- Since the 1940s, seasons have increased from 10 games to 11 and then 12 games in length.
- The NCAA didn't allow freshmen to play varsity football until 1972 (with the exception of the World War II years), allowing players to have four-year careers.
- Bowl games only began counting toward single-season and career statistics in 2002. The Golden Bears have played in 14 bowl games since this decision, giving many recent players an extra game to accumulate statistics.
- Since 2018, players have been allowed to participate in as many as four games in a redshirt season; previously, playing in even one game "burned" the redshirt. Since 2024, postseason games have not counted against the four-game limit. These changes to redshirt rules have given very recent players several extra games to accumulate statistics.
- Due to COVID-19 disruptions, the NCAA did not count the 2020 season against the eligibility of any football player, giving all players active in that season five years of eligibility instead of the normal four.
- California's 11 highest seasons in total offensive output have all come since 2003 under head coaches Jeff Tedford and Sonny Dykes. The 4 seasons under coach Dykes have been Cal's four highest passing yards seasons in school history, leading to quarterbacks Jared Goff and Davis Webb putting up unprecedented passing totals.

These lists are updated through the end of the 2025 season. Players expected to be active for Cal in 2026 are in bold.

== Passing ==
=== Passing yards ===
Career
Rank	Player	Yards	Years
1	Jared Goff	12,200	2013 2014 2015
2	Troy Taylor	8,126	1986 1987 1988 1989
3	Kyle Boller	7,980	1999 2000 2001 2002
4	Pat Barnes	7,360	1993 1994 1995 1996
5	Rich Campbell	7,174	1977 1978 1979 1980
6	Nate Longshore	6,783	2005 2006 2007 2008
7	Chase Garbers	6,580	2018 2019 2020 2021
8	Gale Gilbert	6,566	1980 1981 1982 1983 1984
9	Dave Barr	6,305	1992 1993 1994
10	Kevin Riley	6,182	2007 2008 2009 2010

Single season
Rank	Player	Yards	Year
1	Jared Goff	4,719	2015
2	Davis Webb	4,295	2016
3	Jared Goff	3,973	2014
4	Jared Goff	3,508	2013
5	Pat Barnes	3,499	1996
6	**Jaron-Keawe Sagapolutele**	3,460	2025
7	Jack Plummer	3,095	2022
8	Ross Bowers	3,039	2017
9	Nate Longshore	3,021	2006
10	Fernando Mendoza	3,004	2024

Single game
Rank	Player	Yards	Year	Opponent
1	Jared Goff	542	2015	Arizona State
2	Jared Goff	527	2014	Washington State
3	Davis Webb	522	2016	San Diego State
4	Jared Goff	504	2013	Washington State
5	Pat Barnes	503	1996	Arizona
6	Jared Goff	485	2013	Portland State
7	Davis Webb	478	2016	Arizona State
8	Jared Goff	467	2015	Air Force
9	Jared Goff	458	2014	Colorado
10	Jared Goff	453	2015	Oregon State

=== Passing touchdowns ===
Career
Rank	Player	TDs	Years
1	Jared Goff	96	2013 2014 2015
2	Kyle Boller	64	1999 2000 2001 2002
3	Pat Barnes	54	1993 1994 1995 1996
4	Troy Taylor	51	1986 1987 1988 1989
	Nate Longshore	51	2005 2006 2007 2008
6	Kevin Riley	50	2007 2008 2009 2010
	Chase Garbers	50	2018 2019 2020 2021
8	Dave Barr	48	1992 1993 1994
9	Aaron Rodgers	43	2003 2004
10	Mike Pawlawski	40	1988 1989 1990 1991

Single season
Rank	Player	TDs	Year
1	Jared Goff	43	2015
2	Davis Webb	37	2016
3	Jared Goff	35	2014
4	Pat Barnes	31	1996
5	Kyle Boller	28	2002
6	Aaron Rodgers	24	2004
	Nate Longshore	24	2006
8	Mike Pawlawski	21	1991
	Dave Barr	21	1993
	Jack Plummer	21	2022

Single game
Rank	Player	TDs	Year	Opponent
1	Pat Barnes	8	1996	Arizona
2	Jared Goff	7	2014	Colorado
3	Mike Pawlawski	6	1991	Pacific
	Jared Goff	6	2015	Air Force

== Rushing ==
=== Rushing yards ===
Career
Rank	Player	Yards	Years
1	Russell White	3,367	1990 1991 1992
2	Marshawn Lynch	3,230	2004 2005 2006
3	Justin Forsett	3,220	2004 2005 2006 2007
4	Joe Igber	3,124	1999 2000 2001 2002
5	Chuck Muncie	3,052	1973 1974 1975
6	Paul Jones	2,930	1975 1977 1978 1979
7	Shane Vereen	2,834	2008 2009 2010
8	Jahvid Best	2,668	2007 2008 2009
9	J. J. Arrington	2,625	2003 2004
10	Jaydn Ott	2,587	2022 2023 2024

Single season
Rank	Player	Yards	Year
1	J. J. Arrington	2,018	2004
2	Jahvid Best	1,580	2008
3	Justin Forsett	1,546	2007
4	Chuck Muncie	1,460	1975
5	Marshawn Lynch	1,356	2006
6	Isi Sofele	1,322	2011
7	Jaydn Ott	1,305	2023
8	Marshawn Lynch	1,246	2005
9	Adimchinobe Echemandu	1,195	2003
10	Russell White	1,177	1991

Single game
Rank	Player	Yards	Year	Opponent
1	Jahvid Best	311	2008	Washington
2	Jerry Drew	283	1954	Oregon State
3	Jaydn Ott	274	2022	Arizona
4	Johnny Olszewski	269	1951	Washington State
5	J. J. Arrington	261	2004	Southern Miss
6	Justin Forsett	235	2005	New Mexico State
7	Paul Jones	232	1978	Washington State
8	Russell White	229	1991	USC
9	Joe Igber	226	2002	Stanford
10	Russell White	216	1992	San Jose State

=== Rushing touchdowns ===
Career
Rank	Player	TDs	Years
1	Russell White	35	1990 1991 1992
2	Chuck Muncie	32	1973 1974 1975
3	Marshawn Lynch	29	2004 2005 2006
	Jahvid Best	29	2007 2008 2009
	Shane Vereen	29	2008 2009 2010
6	Justin Forsett	26	2004 2005 2006 2007
7	Jaydn Ott	24	2022 2023 2024
8	Paul Jones	22	1975 1977 1978 1979
	Lindsey Chapman	22	1991 1992 1993
10	J. J. Arrington	20	2003 2004

Single season
Rank	Player	TDs	Year
1	J. J. Arrington	15	2004
	Justin Forsett	15	2007
	Jahvid Best	15	2008
4	Russell White	14	1991
	Lindsey Chapman	14	1993
6	Chuck Muncie	13	1975
	Adimchinobe Echemandu	13	2003
	Shane Vereen	13	2010
	Kendrick Raphael	13	2025
10	Jim Monachino	12	1949
	Jahvid Best	12	2009
	Shane Vereen	12	2009
	Daniel Lasco	12	2014
	Jaydn Ott	12	2023

Single game
Rank	Player	TDs	Year	Opponent
1	Duke Morrison	5	1921	Washington
	Jahvid Best	5	2009	Minnesota
3	Don Johnson	4	1952	Minnesota
	Carl Montgomery	4	1981	Oregon State
	Jahvid Best	4	2008	Washington
	Lindsey Chapman	4	1993	Stanford
	Lindsey Chapman	4	1993	Hawaii

== Receiving ==
=== Receptions ===
Career
Rank	Player	Rec	Years
1	Keenan Allen	205	2010 2011 2012
2	Geoff McArthur	202	2000 2001 2002 2003
3	Dameane Douglas	195	1995 1996 1997 1998
	Bryce Treggs	195	2012 2013 2014 2015
5	Bobby Shaw	180	1994 1995 1996 1997
6	Brian Treggs	167	1988 1989 1990 1991
7	Na’il Benjamin	165	1993 1994 1995 1996
8	DeSean Jackson	162	2005 2006 2007
9	Chris Harper	159	2012 2013 2014
10	Robert Jordan	156	2004 2005 2006 2007
	Marvin Jones	156	2008 2009 2010 2011

Single season
Rank	Player	Rec	Year
1	Jacob De Jesus	108	2025
2	Dameane Douglas	100	1998
3	Keenan Allen	98	2011
4	Chad Hansen	92	2016
5	Geoff McArthur	85	2003
6	Bryce Treggs	77	2013
7	Bobby Shaw	75	1997
8	Lavelle Hawkins	72	2007
9	Chris Harper	70	2013
10	Vic Wharton III	67	2017

Single game
Rank	Player	Rec	Year	Opponent
1	Geoff McArthur	16	2003	Stanford
	Jacob De Jesus	16	2025	Louisville
3	Dameane Douglas	15	1998	Oregon State
4	Chris Harper	14	2013	Washington State
	Chad Hansen	14	2016	Hawaii
	Chad Hansen	14	2016	San Diego State
	Jacob De Jesus	14	2025	Stanford
8	Jack Schraub	13	1964	Illinois
	Iheanyi Uwaezuoke	13	1994	Washington
	Dameane Douglas	13	1998	Stanford
	Dameane Douglas	13	1998	USC
	Keenan Allen	13	2011	USC
	Bryce Treggs	13	2013	Northwestern
	Jacob De Jesus	13	2025	North Carolina

=== Receiving yards ===
Career
Rank	Player	Yards	Years
1	Geoff McArthur	3,188	2000 2001 2002 2003 2004
2	Bobby Shaw	2,731	1994 1995 1996 1997
3	Keenan Allen	2,570	2010 2011 2012
4	Bryce Treggs	2,506	2012 2013 2014 2015
5	DeSean Jackson	2,423	2005 2006 2007
6	Brian Treggs	2,335	1988 1989 1990 1991
	Dameane Douglas	2,335	1995 1996 1997 1998
8	Marvin Jones	2,270	2008 2009 2010 2011
9	Wesley Walker	2,206	1973 1974 1975 1976
10	Na’il Benjamin	2,196	1993 1994 1995 1996

Single season
Rank	Player	Yards	Year
1	Geoff McArthur	1,504	2003
2	Keenan Allen	1,343	2011
3	Chad Hansen	1,249	2016
4	Dameane Douglas	1,150	1998
5	Bobby Shaw	1,093	1997
6	Sean Dawkins	1,070	1992
7	DeSean Jackson	1,060	2006
8	Jacob De Jesus	1,029	2025
9	Jeremiah Hunter	965	2022
10	Mike Caldwell	962	1993

Single game
Rank	Player	Yards	Year	Opponent
1	Wesley Walker	289	1976	San Jose State
2	Geoff McArthur	245	2003	Stanford
3	Chris Harper	231	2013	Washington State
4	Steve Rivera	205	1974	Stanford
5	Bobby Shaw	204	1997	Houston
6	Keenan Allen	197	2011	Washington
7	Chad Hansen	196	2016	Texas
8	Steve Sweeney	195	1971	Oregon State
9	Robert Jordan	192	2005	Washington
	Lavelle Hawkins	192	2007	Oregon State

=== Receiving touchdowns ===
Career
Rank	Player	TDs	Years
1	Sean Dawkins	31	1990 1991 1992
2	Bobby Shaw	27	1994 1995 1996 1997
	Kenny Lawler	27	2012 2013 2014 2015
4	Wesley Walker	23	1973 1974 1975
5	DeSean Jackson	22	2005 2006 2007
6	Steve Sweeney	21	1970 1971 1972
7	Geoff McArthur	20	2000 2001 2002 2003 2004
8	Keenan Allen	17	2010 2011 2012
9	Brian Treggs	15	1988 1989 1990 1991
	Bryce Treggs	15	2012 2013 2014 2015

Single season
Rank	Player	TDs	Year
1	Sean Dawkins	14	1992
2	Steve Sweeney	13	1972
	Kenny Lawler	13	2015
4	Chad Hansen	11	2016
5	Bobby Shaw	10	1997
	Geoff McArthur	10	2003
7	Bobby Shaw	9	1996
	DeSean Jackson	9	2006
	Kenny Lawler	9	2014
10	Cameron Morrah	8	2008

Single game
Rank	Player	TDs	Year	Opponent
1	Steve Sweeney	3	1971	Oregon State
	Steve Sweeney	3	1972	Washington
	Wesley Walker	3	1976	San Jose State
	Floyd Eddings	3	1981	Texas A&M
	Brian Treggs	3	1991	Pacific
	Sean Dawkins	3	1991	USC
	Sean Dawkins	3	1992	San Jose State
	Bobby Shaw	3	1996	Oregon State
	Chase Lyman	3	2004	Oregon State
	Robert Jordan	3	2005	Washington
	DeSean Jackson	3	2006	Minnesota
	Kenny Lawler	3	2013	Arizona
	Kenny Lawler	3	2014	BYU
	Kenny Lawler	3	2015	Grambling State

== Total offense ==
Total offense is the sum of passing and rushing statistics. It does not include receiving or returns.

=== Total offense yards ===
Career
Rank	Player	Yards	Years
1	Jared Goff	12,086	2013 2014 2015
2	Troy Taylor	8,236	1986 1987 1988 1989
3	Kyle Boller	7,811	1999 2000 2001 2002
4	Chase Garbers	7,754	2018 2019 2020 2021
5	Pat Barnes	7,001	1993 1994 1995 1996
6	Rich Campbell	6,799	1977 1978 1979 1980
7	Nate Longshore	6,599	2005 2006 2007 2008
8	Kevin Riley	6,136	2007 2008 2009 2010
9	Dave Barr	5,920	1992 1993 1994
10	Aaron Rodgers	5,805	2003 2004

Single season
Rank	Player	Yards	Year
1	Jared Goff	4,711	2015
2	Davis Webb	4,185	2016
3	Jared Goff	3,929	2014
4	Jared Goff	3,446	2013
5	Pat Barnes	3,416	1996
6	**Jaron-Keawe Sagapolutele**	3,320	2025
7	Aaron Rodgers	3,113	2003
7	Fernando Mendoza	3,109	2024
8	Zach Maynard	3,098	2011
10	Chase Garbers	2,987	2021

Single game
Rank	Player	Yards	Year	Opponent
1	Jared Goff	573	2015	Arizona State
2	Pat Barnes	528	1996	Arizona
3	Jared Goff	527	2014	Washington State
4	Davis Webb	503	2016	San Diego State
5	Jared Goff	487	2013	Washington State
6	Jared Goff	484	2013	Portland State
7	Davis Webb	457	2016	Arizona State
8	Jared Goff	451	2015	Air Force
9	Jared Goff	446	2014	Colorado
10	Jared Goff	440	2015	Oregon State

=== Touchdowns responsible for ===
"Touchdowns responsible for" is the NCAA's official term for combined passing and rushing touchdowns.

Career
Rank	Player	TDs	Years
1	Jared Goff	97	2013 2014 2015
2	Kyle Boller	70	1999 2000 2001 2002
3	Chase Garbers	61	2018 2019 2020 2021
4	Pat Barnes	56	1993 1994 1995 1996
5	Nate Longshore	55	2005 2006 2007 2008
	Kevin Riley	55	2007 2008 2009 2010
7	Troy Taylor	53	1986 1987 1988 1989
8	Aaron Rodgers	51	2003 2004
9	Dave Barr	49	1992 1993 1994
10	Mike Pawlawski	44	1988 1989 1990 1991

Single season
Rank	Player	TDs	Year
1	Jared Goff	43	2015
	Davis Webb	43	2016
3	Jared Goff	35	2014
4	Pat Barnes	32	1996
5	Kyle Boller	31	2002
6	Aaron Rodgers	27	2004
	Nate Longshore	27	2006
8	Aaron Rodgers	24	2003
9	Mike Pawlawski	22	1991
	Jack Plummer	22	2022
	**Jaron-Keawe Sagapolutele**	22	2025

== Defense ==
=== Interceptions ===
Career
Rank	Player	Ints	Years
1	Ken Wiedemann	16	1967 1968 1969
2	Daymeion Hughes	15	2003 2004 2005 2006
3	Paul Keckley	12	1946 1947 1948
	Paul Larson	12	1951 1952 1953 1954
	Ray Youngblood	12	1969 1970 1971
6	Ron Coccimiglio	11	1978 1979 1980
	Deltha O'Neal	11	1996 1997 1998 1999
8	Matt Hazeltine	10	1951 1952 1953 1954
	Ken Moulton	10	1963 1964 1965
	Anthony Green	10	1975 1976 1977
	Jaylinn Hawkins	10	2016 2017 2018 2019

Single season
Rank	Player	Ints	Year
1	Deltha O'Neal	9	1999
2	Daymeion Hughes	8	2006
3	Joe Stuart	7	1944
	Jackie Jensen	7	1947
	Paul Keckley	7	1948
	Jim Hunt	7	1964
	Ken Wiedemann	7	1968
	Nohl Williams	7	2024

Single game
Rank	Player	Ints	Year	Opponent
1	Herm Edwards	4	1974	Washington State

=== Tackles ===
Career
Rank	Player	Tackles	Years
1	David Ortega	525	1986 1987 1988 1989
2	Hardy Nickerson	501	1983 1984 1985 1986
3	Jerrott Willard	469	1991 1992 1993 1994
4	Evan Weaver	407	2016 2017 2018 2019
5	Mike Mohamed	340	2007 2008 2009 2010
6	Ron Rivera	336	1980 1981 1982 1983
7	Eddie Walsh	288	1980 1981 1982 1983
8	Steve Hendrickson	286	1985 1986 1987 1988
9	Jordan Kunaszyk	273	2016 2017 2018
10	Majett Whiteside	268	1985 1986 1987 1988

Single season
Rank	Player	Tackles	Year
1	Evan Weaver	182	2019
2	Hardy Nickerson	167	1985
3	David Ortega	159	1989
4	Evan Weaver	155	2018
5	Jordan Kunaszyk	148	2018
6	Jerrott Willard	147	1993
7	David Ortega	142	1987
8	Hardy Nickerson	141	1984
9	Ron Rivera	138	1983
10	Steve Hendrickson	134	1988

=== Sacks ===
Career
Rank	Player	Sacks	Years
1	Andre Carter	31.0	1997 1998 1999 2000
2	Regan Upshaw	28.0	1993 1994 1995
3	Tully Banta-Cain	26.5	1999 2000 2001 2002
4	Mawuko Tugbenyo	25.0	1996 1997 1998 1999
5	Brandon Whiting	24.5	1994 1995 1996 1997
6	Zack Follett	23.5	2005 2006 2007 2008
7	Ron Rivera	22.0	1980 1981 1982 1983
8	Ryan Riddle	21.0	2003 2004
	Cameron Goode	21.0	2017 2018 2019 2020 2021
10	Joel Dickson	20.0	1986 1987 1988 1989 1990
	Sekou Sanyika	20.0	1996 1997 1998 1999

Single season
Rank	Player	Sacks	Year
1	Ryan Riddle	14.5	2004
2	Andre Carter	13.5	2000
3	Ron Rivera	13.0	1983
	Tully Banta-Cain	13.0	2002
5	Mawuko Tugbenyo	12.5	1999
6	Tom Canada	12.0	2002
7	Regan Upshaw	11.0	1994
8	Duane Clemons	10.5	1995
	Zack Follett	10.5	2008
10	Andre Carter	10.0	1999

Single game
Rank	Player	Sacks	Year	Opponent
1	Tully Banta-Cain	4.5	2002	New Mexico State
2	Mawuko Tugbenyo	4.0	1999	USC
	Tully Banta-Cain	4.0	2001	Rutgers

== Kicking ==
=== Field goals made ===
Career
Rank	Player	FGs	Years
1	Matt Anderson	60	2014 2015 2016 2017
2	Doug Brien	56	1991 1992 1993
3	Giorgio Tavecchio	48	2008 2009 2010 2011
4	Mark-Christian Jensen	45	1999 2000 2001 2002
5	Vincenzo D'Amato	40	2009 2012 2013

Single season
Rank	Player	FGs	Year
1	Randy Pratt	22	1983
	Matt Anderson	22	2016

Single game
Rank	Player	FGs	Year	Opponent
1	Mark Jensen	5	2002	Air Force
	Derek Morris	5	2024	Oregon State
