= 2015 California Golden Bears football team =

American college football season

2015 California Golden Bears football

Armed Forces Bowl champion

Armed Forces Bowl, W 55–36 vs. Air Force
- Conference: Pac-12 Conference
- North Division
- Record: 8–5 (4–5 Pac-12)
- Head coach: Sonny Dykes (3rd season)
- Offensive coordinator: Tony Franklin (3rd season)
- Offensive scheme: Bear raid
- Defensive coordinator: Art Kaufman (2nd season)
- Base defense: 4–3
- Home stadium: California Memorial Stadium

2015 Pac-12 Conference football standings
	Conf.			Overall
Team	W		L	W		L
North Division
No. 3 Stanford xy$	8	–	1	12	–	2
No. 19 Oregon	7	–	2	9	–	4
Washington State	6	–	3	9	–	4
California	4	–	5	8	–	5
Washington	4	–	5	7	–	6
Oregon State	0	–	9	2	–	10
South Division
USC xy	6	–	3	8	–	6
No. 17 Utah x	6	–	3	10	–	3
UCLA	5	–	4	8	–	5
Arizona State	4	–	5	6	–	7
Arizona	3	–	6	7	–	6
Colorado	1	–	8	4	–	9
Championship: Stanford 41, USC 22
$ – Conference champion; x – Division champion/co-champions; y – Championship game participant; Rankings from AP Poll

The 2015 California Golden Bears football team represented the University of California, Berkeley in the 2015 NCAA Division I FBS football season. The Bears were led by third-year head coach Sonny Dykes and played their home games at Memorial Stadium.

At the beginning of the season, Cal jumped out to a 5–0 start, their best since 2007. In Week 3, the Bears defeated Texas 45–44 in Austin, marking the program's first-ever victory over the Longhorns. The following week, Cal beat Washington 30–24, earning their first victory in Seattle since 2005 and snapping a six-game losing streak to the Huskies. Cal then went on to lose five of its next six games, including losses to rivals UCLA, USC, and Oregon, and a 13-point loss to arch-rival Stanford for their sixth consecutive Big Game defeat. The Golden Bears rebounded with a 54–24 win over last-place Oregon State, in which Cal gained a school-record 760 yards while becoming bowl-eligible for the first time since 2011. With a 48–46 win over Arizona State on Senior Day, Cal finished the regular season with a 7–5 record, clinching their first winning season since 2011. They finished the year 8–5 including a 55–36 victory over Air Force in the Armed Forces Bowl. Nevertheless, at 4–5 Cal finished with a losing Pac-12 record for the third consecutive season.

The 2015 season was the last at Cal for three-year starting quarterback Jared Goff, who entered the program at the same time as Dykes and set 26 team records during his time in Berkeley. Following the Armed Forces Bowl, Goff declared for the 2016 NFL draft. He was selected first overall by the Los Angeles Rams, and went on to lead the Rams to Super Bowl LIII.

Following the season, Sonny Dykes' contract was extended until 2019, owing to the team's athletic and academic improvements during his tenure.

== Schedule ==
Date	Time	Opponent	Rank	Site	TV	Result	Attendance
September 5	2:00 p.m.	Grambling State*		California Memorial Stadium; Berkeley, CA	P12N	W 73–14	60,606
September 12	2:00 p.m.	San Diego State*		California Memorial Stadium; Berkeley, CA	P12N	W 35–7	50,830
September 19	7:30 p.m.	at Texas*		Darrell K Royal–Texas Memorial Stadium; Austin, TX	FOX	W 45–44	91,568
September 26	2:00 p.m.	at Washington		Husky Stadium; Seattle, WA	P12N	W 30–24	61,066
October 3	1:00 p.m.	Washington State^{†}	No. 24	California Memorial Stadium; Berkeley, CA	P12N	W 34–28	42,042
October 10	7:00 p.m.	at No. 5 Utah	No. 23	Rice–Eccles Stadium; Salt Lake City, UT (College GameDay)	ESPN	L 24–30	47,798
October 22	6:00 p.m.	at UCLA	No. 20	Rose Bowl; Pasadena, CA (rivalry)	ESPN	L 24–40	57,046
October 31	12:00 p.m.	USC		California Memorial Stadium; Berkeley, CA	FOX	L 21–27	52,060
November 7	7:30 p.m.	at Oregon		Autzen Stadium; Eugene, OR	ESPN2	L 28–44	56,604
November 14	7:30 p.m.	Oregon State		California Memorial Stadium; Berkeley, CA	P12N	W 54–24	41,874
November 21	7:30 p.m.	at No. 15 Stanford		Stanford Stadium; Stanford, CA (Big Game)	ESPN	L 22–35	51,424
November 28	7:00 p.m.	Arizona State		California Memorial Stadium; Berkeley, CA	FS1	W 48–46	45,385
December 29	11:00 a.m.	vs. Air Force*		Amon G. Carter Stadium; Fort Worth, TX (Armed Forces Bowl)	ESPN	W 55–36	38,915
*Non-conference game; ^{†}Homecoming; Rankings from AP Poll released prior to the game; All times are in Pacific time

== Personnel ==
=== Coaching staff ===
Name	Position	Before Cal
Sonny Dykes	Head Coach	Louisiana Tech - Head Coach 2010–2012
Tony Franklin	Offensive coordinator/QB/RB	Louisiana Tech – Offensive coordinator/QB 2010–2012
Art Kaufman	Defensive coordinator	Cincinnati – Defensive coordinator/linebackers 2013
Greg Burns	Linebackers	Umass – Defensive backs 2013
Brandon Jones	Run Game Coordinator/offensive line	East Carolina – Offensive line 2010–2014
John Lovett	Defensive backs	Philadelphia Eagles – Defensive backs 2013–2014
Jacob Peeler	Wide receivers	Cal - Graduate assistant, offense/wide receivers 2013–2014
Fred Tate	Defensive line	Cincinnati - Defensive tackles (2013)
Mark Tommerdahl	Assistant head coach/special teams coordinator	Louisiana Tech - Special teams coordinator/inside receivers 2009–2012
Damon Harrington	Head Strength and Conditioning	Louisiana Tech - Head strength and conditioning 2006–2012
Dr. Casey Batten	Team Physician	University of California San Francisco, Assistant Clinical Professor of Orthopedics - Prior to 2006
Source: California Golden Bears Football 2015 Coaching Staff

=== Roster ===
Offense Quarterbacks: 7 Ross Bowers - FR - Bothell, CA; 15 David Maaghul - FR - San Francisco, CA; 11 Andrew Black - (redshirt) FR - Spokane, WA; 14 Chase Forrest - (redshirt) FR - Santa Ana, CA; 16 Jared Goff - JR - Novato, CA; 18 Cole Webb - SR - San Pedro, CA; Wide receivers: 17 Austin Aaron - FR - Napa, CA; 81 Kanawai Noa - FR - Honolulu, HI; 19 Brandon Singleton - FR - Boutte, LA; 6 Carlos Strickland - FR - Dallas, TX; 13 Erik Brown - (redshirt) FR - Fontana, CA; 84 Justin Dunn - (redshirt) FR - Lafayette, CA; 87 Kyle Wells - (redshirt) FR - Loomis, CA; 32 Nick White - (redshirt) FR - Irvine, CA; 21 Jack Austin - SO - Chino Hills, CA; 6 Chad Hansen - SO - Fillmore, CA; 11 Raymond Hudson - SO - Pleasanton, CA; 28 Patrick Laird - SO - San Luis Obispo, CA; 24 Matt Rockett - SO - Santa Ana, CA; 7 Vic Wharton III - SO - Spring Hill, TN; 4 Kenny Lawler - JR - Pomona, CA; 88 Patrick Worstell - JR - Danville, CA; 9 Trevor Davis - SR - Martinez, CA; 3 Maurice Harris - SR - Greensboro, NC; 10 Darius Powe - SR - Lakewood, CA; 1 Bryce Treggs - SR - Inglewood, CA; Tight ends: 82 Frank Kapp - FR - Los Altos, CA; 85 Nick Palleschi - FR - Kailua-Kona, Hawai'i; 80 Jake Ashton - (redshirt) FR - Indio, CA; 89 Stephen Anderson - SR - San Jose, CA; Running backs: 38 Alex Netherda - FR - Santa Rosa, CA; 22 Lonny Powell - FR - Sacramento, CA; 23 Vic Enwere - SO - Austin, TX; 33 Fabiano Hale - SO - Santa Cruz, CA; 5 Tre Watson - SO - Corona, CA; 20 Jeffrey Coprich - JR - Watts, CA; 29 Khalfani Muhammad - JR - Sherman Oaks, CA; 36 Vincent"Bug" Rivera - JR - San Diego, CA; 2 Daniel Lasco - SR - The Woodlands, TX; H-backs: 99 Malik McMorris - FR - Santa Ana, CA; 86 Justin Norbeck - FB - Irvine, CA; Offensive line: 76 Henry Bazakas - FR - Berkeley, CA; 74 Ryan Gibson - FR - Bay St. Louis, MS; 79 Patrick Mekari - FR - Westlake Village, CA	58 Semisi Uluave - FR - Honolulu, HI; 50 Zach Artman - (redshirt) FR - San Jose, CA; 72 Kamryn Bennett - (redshirt) FR - Peoria, AZ; 54 Deion Oliver - (redshirt) FR - Warminster, PS; 57 Addison Ooms - (redshirt) FR - Laguna Niguel, CA; 56 Michael Trani - (redshirt) FR - La Mirada, CA; 75 Aaron Cochran - SO - Atwater, CA; 77 J.D. Hinnant - SO - Fountain Valley, CA; 78 Vincent Johnson - SO - El Dorado Hills, CA; 66 Chris Borrayo - JR - Paramount, CA; 55 Dominic Granado - JR - Huntington Beach, CA; 64 Steven Moore - JR - Elk Grove, CA; 70 Benji Palu - JR - Burlingame, CA; 59 Brian Farley - SR - San Diego, CA; 73 Jordan Rigsbee - SR - Chico, CA; Defense Defensive ends: 94 Trevor Howard - FR - Thousand Oaks, CA; 44 Zeandae Johnson - FR - Fresno, CA; 51 Cameron Saffle - FR - Sammamish, WA; 89 Nick Allard - (redshirt) FR - Carlsbad, CA; 45 Kennedy Emesibe - (redshirt) FR - Hesperia, CA; 33 Noah Westerfield - SO - Frisco, TX; 98 Cody Bickham - JR - Half Moon Bay, CA; 95 DeVante Wilson - JR - Corona, CA; 41 Todd Barr - SR - Lakewood, CA; 11 Jonathan Johnson - SR - Pittsburgh, PA; 13 Kyle Kragen - SR - Danville, CA; 75 Puka Lopa - SR - Sacramento, CA; Defensive tackles: 50 Hunter Abel - FR - Piedmont, CA; 93 Luc Bequette - FR - Little Rock, AR; 53 Russell Ude - FR - Atlanta, GA; 96 Chris Palmer - (redshirt) FR - Lawrenceville, GA; 9 James Looney - SO - Lake Worth, FL; 97 Tony Mekari - SO - Westlake Village, CA; 92 Marcus Manley - JR - Los Angeles, CA; 52 David Davis - SR - Palos Verdes, Est., CA; 90 Mustafa Jalil - SR - San Diego, CA; 91 Trevor Kelly - SR - South SF, CA; Linebackers: 43 Harrison Mayo - FR - Amador Valley, CA; 46 Drew Bryant - (redshirt) FR - Sparks, NV; 56 Joe Castignani - (redshirt) FR - San Jose, CA; 40 David Ortega Jr. - (redshirt) FR - Moraga, CA; 25 Hamilton Anoa'i - SO - San Mateo, CA; 10 Caleb Coleman - SO - Berkeley, CA; 31 Raymond Davison - SO - Encino, CA; 1 Devante Downs - SO - Mountlake Terrace, WA	55 Aisea Tongilava - SO - Garden Grove, CA; 8 Michael Barton - JR - Richmond, CA; 19 Maximo Espitia - JR - Salem, OR; 30 Jake Kearney - JR - Livermore, CA; 47 Hardy Nickerson Jr. - JR - Oakland, CA; 22 Nathan Broussard - SR - Plano, TX; 7 Jalen Jefferson - SR - Oxnard, CA; Safeties: 24 Billy McCrary III - FR - Austin, TX; 32 Evan Rambo - FR - Los Angeles, CA; 19 Trey Turner - FR - Mobile, AL; 36 Jonathan McDonald- (redshirt) FR - Orinda, CA; 16 Chibuzo Nwokocha - (redshirt) FR - Elk Grove, CA; 28 Quentin Tartabull - (redshirt) FR - Mission Hills, CA; 4 Derron Brown - SO - Oakland, CA; 42 David Garner - SO - Fort Lauderdale, FL; 14 A.J. Greathouse - SO - Chandler, AZ; 17 Luke Rubenzer - SO - Scottsdale, AZ; 36 Kaodi Dike - JR - Mountain House, CA; 27 Damariay Drew - JR - Livermore, CA; 26 Griffin Piatt - JR - Moraga, CA; 39 Khari Vanderbilt - JR - San Jose, CA; 21 Stefan McClure - SR - Vista, CA; G; Cornerbacks: 27 Ashtyn Davis - FR - Santa Cruz, CA; 20 Jaylinn Hawkins - FR Buena Park, CA; 23 Malik Psalms - FR - Chino Hills, CA; 2 Darius Allensworth - SO - Menifee, CA; 34 Grace De'zhon - SO - Oakland, CA; 15 Antoine Albert - JR - Oakland, CA; 37 Cedric Dozier - JR - Roanoke, AL; 6 Darius White - SR - Grenada, MS; 18 Joel Willis - SR - Garden Grove, CA; Nicklebacks: 48 Jacob Anderson - JR - Tustin, CA; 23 Cameron Walker - JR - Los Angeles, CA; Special teams Place Kickers: 9 Matt Anderson - SO - Danville, CA; 41 Robbie McInerny - SO - Laguna Beach, CA; 13 Noah Beito - JR - Scotts Valley, CA; 39 Franklyn Cervenka - JR - La Cañada Flintridge, CA; Punters: 43 Dylan Klumph - SO - Malibu, CA; 16 Cole Leininger - SR - Fruit Cove, FL; Both P and PK: 37 Ethan Erickson - FR - Pacific Palisades, CA; 38 Harry Adolphus - SO - Guilford, UK; Long snappers: 45 Grant Gluhaich - FR - Morgan Hill, CA; 48 Bradley E. Northnagel - JR - San Carlos, CA
Source: California Golden Bears Football 2015 Roster

=== Recruiting ===
==== Incoming class 2015 ====
SCOUT RIVALS, ESPN, as well as the official roster are the primary sources. The incoming class was ranked #25 by Rivals, #36 by Scout, and #53 by ESPN.

College recruiting information (2015)
Name	Hometown	School	Height	Weight	40^{‡}	Commit date
Ross Bowers; QB	Bothell, WA	Bothell High School	6 ft 2 in (1.88 m)	175 lb (79 kg)	--	Jul 18, 2014
Ross Bowers; QB	Recruit ratings: Scout: Rivals: ESPN:					
Austin Aaron; WR	Napa, CA	Napa High School	6 ft 5 in (1.96 m)	202 lb (92 kg)	--	Apr 19, 2014
Austin Aaron; WR	Recruit ratings: Scout: Rivals: ESPN:					
Greyson Bankhead; WR	Corona, CA	Centennial High School	5 ft 9 in (1.75 m)	150 lb (68 kg)	--	May 2, 2014
Greyson Bankhead; WR	Recruit ratings: Scout: Rivals: ESPN:					
Kanawi Noa; WR	Honolulu, HI	Punahou School	6 ft 1 in (1.85 m)	175 lb (79 kg)	--	Dec 18, 2014
Kanawi Noa; WR	Recruit ratings: Scout: Rivals: ESPN:					
Brandon Singleton; WR	Boutte, LA	Hahnville High School	6 ft 0 in (1.83 m)	170 lb (77 kg)	4.5	--
Brandon Singleton; WR	Recruit ratings: Scout: Rivals: ESPN:					
Carlos Strickland; WR	Dallas, TX	Skyline High School	6 ft 4 in (1.93 m)	197 lb (89 kg)	4.48	Jan 27, 2015
Carlos Strickland; WR	Recruit ratings: Scout: Rivals: ESPN:					
Lonny Powell; RB	Sacramento, CA	Sacramento High School	5 ft 11 in (1.80 m)	205 lb (93 kg)	--	May 8, 2014
Lonny Powell; RB	Recruit ratings: Scout: Rivals: ESPN:					
Ryan Gibson; OL	Bay Saint Louis, MS	St. Stanislaus High School	6 ft 4 in (1.93 m)	275 lb (125 kg)	5.0	Jun 19, 2014
Ryan Gibson; OL	Recruit ratings: Scout: Rivals: ESPN:					
Patrick Mekari; OL	Westlake Village, CA	Westlake High School	6 ft 5 in (1.96 m)	300 lb (140 kg)	--	Dec 16, 2014
Patrick Mekari; OL	Recruit ratings: Scout: Rivals: ESPN:					
Semisi Uluave; OL	Honolulu, HI	Punahou School	6 ft 5 in (1.96 m)	305 lb (138 kg)	--	Feb 4, 2015
Semisi Uluave; OL	Recruit ratings: Scout: Rivals: ESPN:					
Trevor Howard; DE	Westlake Village, CA	Oaks Christian High School	6 ft 3 in (1.91 m)	218 lb (99 kg)	--	Aug 10, 2014
Trevor Howard; DE	Recruit ratings: Scout: Rivals: ESPN:					
Zeandae Johnson; DE	Fresno, CA	Central High School	6 ft 2 in (1.88 m)	240 lb (110 kg)	4.66	Jun 28, 2014
Zeandae Johnson; DE	Recruit ratings: Scout: Rivals: ESPN:					
Cameron Saffle; DE	Sammamish, WA	Skyline High School	6 ft 4 in (1.93 m)	230 lb (100 kg)	--	Dec 17, 2014
Cameron Saffle; DE	Recruit ratings: Scout: Rivals: ESPN:					
DeVante Wilson; DE	Riverside, CA	Riverside City College	6 ft 6 in (1.98 m)	260 lb (120 kg)	4.6	Dec 14, 2014
DeVante Wilson; DE	Recruit ratings: Scout: Rivals: ESPN:					
Russell Ude; DT	Atlanta, GA	Westminster Schools	6 ft 3 in (1.91 m)	264 lb (120 kg)	--	--
Russell Ude; DT	Recruit ratings: Scout: Rivals: ESPN:					
Luc Bequette; DT	Little Rock, AR	Catholic High School	6 ft 2 in (1.88 m)	285 lb (129 kg)	5.0	Aug 3, 2014
Luc Bequette; DT	Recruit ratings: Scout: Rivals: ESPN:					
Derron Brown; S	Laveen, AZ	San Diego Mesa College	6 ft 2 in (1.88 m)	195 lb (88 kg)	--	Dec 1, 2014
Derron Brown; S	Recruit ratings: Scout: Rivals: ESPN:					
Billy McCrary III; S	Leander, TX	Rouse High School	5 ft 11 in (1.80 m)	193 lb (88 kg)	4.38	Nov 25, 2014
Billy McCrary III; S	Recruit ratings: Scout: Rivals: ESPN:					
Evan Rambo; S	Pasadena, CA	La Salle High School	6 ft 3 in (1.91 m)	185 lb (84 kg)	--	Nov 18, 2014
Evan Rambo; S	Recruit ratings: Scout: Rivals: ESPN:					
Khari Vanderbilt; S	San Jose, CA	San Jose City College	6 ft 2 in (1.88 m)	185 lb (84 kg)	--	Jun 9, 2015
Khari Vanderbilt; S	Recruit ratings: Scout: Rivals: ESPN:					
Jaylinn Hawkins; CB	Buena Park, CA	Buena Park High School	6 ft 0 in (1.83 m)	180 lb (82 kg)	--	Feb 4, 2015
Jaylinn Hawkins; CB	Recruit ratings: Scout: Rivals: ESPN:					
Malik Psalms; CB	Chino Hills, CA	Ayala High School	6 ft 1 in (1.85 m)	174 lb (79 kg)	--	Apr 20, 2014
Malik Psalms; CB	Recruit ratings: Scout: Rivals: ESPN:					
Antoine Albert; CB	Pleasant Hill, CA	Diablo Valley College	6 ft 2 in (1.88 m)	200 lb (91 kg)	4.50	Dec 18, 2014
Antoine Albert; CB	Recruit ratings: Scout: Rivals: ESPN:					
Dylan Klumph; P	Encino, CA	Golden West College	6 ft 3 in (1.91 m)	230 lb (100 kg)	--	--
Dylan Klumph; P	Recruit ratings: Scout:					
Overall recruit ranking:
‡ Refers to 40-yard dash; Note: In many cases, Scout, Rivals, 247Sports, On3, and ESPN may conflict in their listings of height, weight and 40 time.; In these cases, the average was taken. ESPN grades are on a 100-point scale.; Sources: "2015 Team Ranking". Rivals.com.

==== Commitments for 2016 ====
SCOUT RIVALS and ESPN are the primary sources. As of 10/9/2015 the 2016 class is ranked #25 by Rivals# and #38 by Scout.

College recruiting information (2016)
Name	Hometown	School	Height	Weight	40^{‡}	Commit date
Zion Echols; ATH	Covina, CA	Charter Oak High School	5 ft 8 in (1.73 m)	169 lb (77 kg)	4.53	May 23, 2015
Zion Echols; ATH	Recruit ratings: Scout: Rivals: ESPN:					
Armani Rogers; QB	Los Angeles, CA	Alexander Hamilton High School	6 ft 5 in (1.96 m)	200 lb (91 kg)	4.72	Feb 23, 2015
Armani Rogers; QB	Recruit ratings: Scout: Rivals: ESPN:					
Max Gilliam; QB	Thousand Oaks, CA	Thousand Oaks High School	6 ft 2 in (1.88 m)	191 lb (87 kg)	4.62	Apr 10, 2015
Max Gilliam; QB	Recruit ratings: Scout: Rivals: ESPN:					
Derrick Clark; RB	San Diego, CA	Mission Bay Senior High School	5 ft 11 in (1.80 m)	195 lb (88 kg)	--	Apr 11, 2015
Derrick Clark; RB	Recruit ratings: Scout: Rivals: ESPN:					
Drew Kobayashi; WR	Honolulu, HI	Saint Louis School	6 ft 2 in (1.88 m)	185 lb (84 kg)	4.54	Jun 18, 2015
Drew Kobayashi; WR	Recruit ratings: Scout: Rivals: ESPN:					
Matt Laris; WR	Sammamish, WA	Eastside Catholic School	6 ft 4 in (1.93 m)	210 lb (95 kg)	4.75	Jun 20, 2015
Matt Laris; WR	Recruit ratings: Scout: Rivals: ESPN:					
Melquise Stovall; WR/RB	Lancaster, CA	Paraclete High School	5 ft 7.5 in (1.71 m)	177 lb (80 kg)	--	Dec 21, 2015
Melquise Stovall; WR/RB	Recruit ratings: Scout: Rivals: ESPN:					
Logan Gamble; WR	Long Beach, CA	Saint Anthony High School	6 ft 5 in (1.96 m)	188 lb (85 kg)	4.70	Jun 15, 2015
Logan Gamble; WR	Recruit ratings: Scout: Rivals: ESPN:					
Jordan Veasy; WR	Itawamba, MA	Itawamba Community College	6 ft 3 in (1.91 m)	218 lb (99 kg)	--	Dec 9, 2015
Jordan Veasy; WR	Recruit ratings: Rivals: ESPN:					
Marloshawn Franklin; CB	Detroit, MI	Mesa Community College	6 ft 0 in (1.83 m)	180 lb (82 kg)	--	Dec 16, 2015
Marloshawn Franklin; CB	Recruit ratings: Scout: Rivals: ESPN:					
Traveon Beck; CB	Bellflower, CA	St. John Bosco High School	5 ft 10 in (1.78 m)	170 lb (77 kg)	4.54	May 20, 2015
Traveon Beck; CB	Recruit ratings: Scout: Rivals: ESPN:					
Josh Drayden; CB	Dallas, TX	Bishop Dunne Catholic School	5 ft 10 in (1.78 m)	175 lb (79 kg)	4.40	Jun 14, 2015
Josh Drayden; CB	Recruit ratings: Scout: Rivals: ESPN:					
Camryn Bynum; CB	Corona, CA	Centennial High School	5 ft 10 in (1.78 m)	160 lb (73 kg)	4.66	Jul 1, 2015
Camryn Bynum; CB	Recruit ratings: Scout: Rivals: ESPN:					
Evan Weaver; DE	Spokane, WA	Gonzaga Preparatory School	6 ft 3 in (1.91 m)	240 lb (110 kg)	4.75	Aug 14, 2015
Evan Weaver; DE	Recruit ratings: Scout: Rivals: ESPN:					
Russell Becker; DE	Fergus Falls, MN	Minnesota State Community and Technical College	6 ft 4 in (1.93 m)	255 lb (116 kg)	--	Jun 22, 2015
Russell Becker; DE	Recruit ratings: Scout: Rivals:					
Chris Yaghi; DT	Santa Ana, CA	Foothill High School	6 ft 4 in (1.93 m)	275 lb (125 kg)	5.2	Jul 4, 2015
Chris Yaghi; DT	Recruit ratings: Scout: Rivals: ESPN:					
Tevin Paul; DT	Austin, TX	Lake Travis High School	6 ft 4 in (1.93 m)	268 lb (122 kg)	4.85	Jul 13, 2015
Tevin Paul; DT	Recruit ratings: Scout: Rivals: ESPN:					
A.J. McCollum; OL	San Francisco, CA	City College of San Francisco	6 ft 1 in (1.85 m)	290 lb (130 kg)	--	Jul 24, 2015
A.J. McCollum; OL	Recruit ratings: Scout: Rivals:					
Gentle Williams; OG	Florence, MS	Florence High School	6 ft 3 in (1.91 m)	278 lb (126 kg)	5.17	Aug 4, 2015
Gentle Williams; OG	Recruit ratings: Scout: Rivals: ESPN:					
Gentle Williams; OG	Florence, MS	Florence High School	6 ft 3 in (1.91 m)	278 lb (126 kg)	5.17	Aug 4, 2015
Gentle Williams; OG	Recruit ratings: Scout: Rivals: ESPN:					
Dwayne Wallace; OG	Riverside, CA	Riverside Community College	6 ft 5 in (1.96 m)	340 lb (150 kg)	--	Dec 9, 2015
Dwayne Wallace; OG	Recruit ratings: Scout: Rivals: ESPN:					
Jake Curhan; OT	Larkspur, CA	Redwood High School	6 ft 7 in (2.01 m)	315 lb (143 kg)	--	May 15, 2015
Jake Curhan; OT	Recruit ratings: Scout: Rivals: ESPN:					
Daniel Juarez; OT	Corona, CA	Centennial High School	6 ft 5 in (1.96 m)	292 lb (132 kg)	5.57	Apr 15, 2015
Daniel Juarez; OT	Recruit ratings: Scout: Rivals: ESPN:					
Francisco Perez; OT	Baldwin Park, CA	Baldwin Park High School	6 ft 5 in (1.96 m)	301 lb (137 kg)	5.75	Jul 2, 2015
Francisco Perez; OT	Recruit ratings: Scout: Rivals: ESPN:					
Overall recruit ranking:
‡ Refers to 40-yard dash; Note: In many cases, Scout, Rivals, 247Sports, On3, and ESPN may conflict in their listings of height, weight and 40 time.; In these cases, the average was taken. ESPN grades are on a 100-point scale.; Sources: "2016 Team Ranking". Rivals.com.

== Rankings ==
Ranking movements Legend: ██ Increase in ranking ██ Decrease in ranking — = Not ranked RV = Received votes
	Week															
Poll	Pre	1	2	3	4	5	6	7	8	9	10	11	12	13	14	Final
AP	RV	RV	RV	RV	24	23	23	20	RV	RV	—	—	—	—	—	—
Coaches	—	RV	RV	RV	24	22	23	19	RV	—	—	—	—	—	—	—
CFP	Not released									—	—	—	—	—	—	Not released

== Game summaries ==
=== Grambling State ===
	1	2	3	4	Total
Tigers	0	0	0	14	14
Golden Bears	35	17	14	7	73

=== San Diego State ===
	1	2	3	4	Total
Aztecs	7	0	0	0	7
Golden Bears	0	14	14	7	35

=== Texas ===
	1	2	3	4	Total
Golden Bears	7	17	21	0	45
Longhorns	7	17	0	20	44

=== Washington ===
	1	2	3	4	Total
Golden Bears	3	17	7	3	30
Huskies	7	0	14	3	24

=== Washington State ===
	1	2	3	4	Total
Cougars	7	14	7	0	28
#24 Golden Bears	7	6	21	0	34

=== Utah ===
	1	2	3	4	Total
#23 Golden Bears	7	10	7	0	24
#5 Utes	10	14	3	3	30

=== UCLA ===
	1	2	3	4	Total
#20 Golden Bears	3	7	6	8	24
Bruins	10	16	14	0	40

=== USC ===
	1	2	3	4	Total
Trojans	0	10	17	0	27
Golden Bears	7	0	7	7	21

=== Oregon ===
	1	2	3	4	Total
Golden Bears	10	0	11	7	28
Ducks	3	28	3	10	44

=== Oregon State ===
	1	2	3	4	Total
Beavers	0	10	14	0	24
Golden Bears	7	17	20	10	54

=== Stanford ===
	1	2	3	4	Total
Golden Bears	3	3	10	6	22
Cardinal	7	14	0	14	35

=== Arizona State ===
	1	2	3	4	Total
Sun Devils	10	17	6	13	46
Golden Bears	3	7	21	17	48

=== Air Force ===
	1	2	3	4	Total
Golden Bears	14	21	17	3	55
Falcons	7	14	8	7	36
