= Jordan Evans (American football) =

American football player (born 1995)

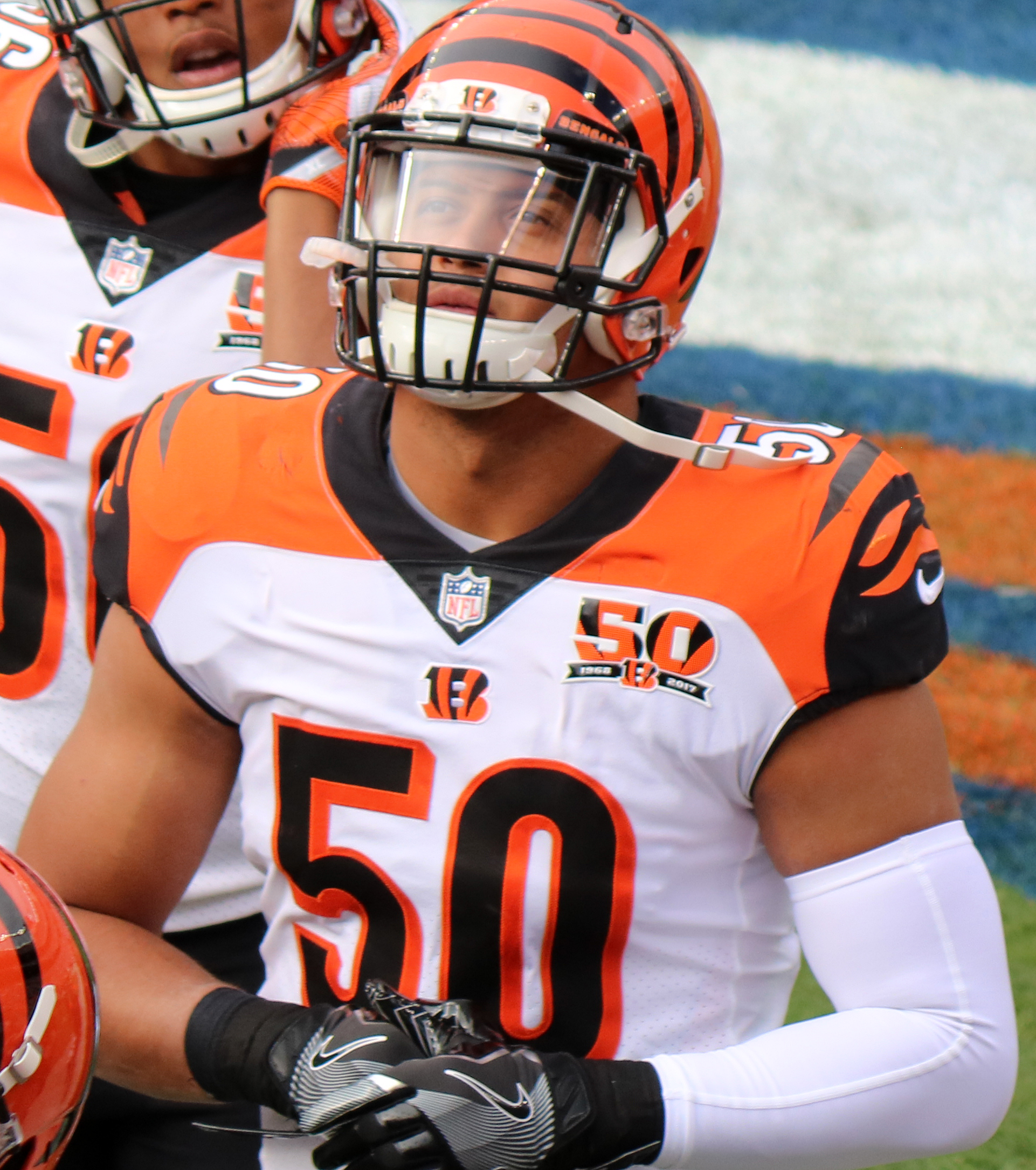
- Evans with the Cincinnati Bengals in 2017

No. 50
- Position: Linebacker

Personal information
- Born: January 27, 1995 (age 31); Norman, Oklahoma, U.S.
- Listed height: 6 ft 3 in (1.91 m)
- Listed weight: 242 lb (110 kg)

Career information
- High school: Norman North
- College: Oklahoma (2013–2016)
- NFL draft: 2017: 6th round, 193rd overall pick

Career history
- Cincinnati Bengals (2017–2021); Seattle Sea Dragons (2023); DC Defenders (2024)*
- * Offseason or practice squad member only

Awards and highlights
- Second-team All-Big 12 (2015)

Career NFL statistics
- Total tackles: 127
- Sacks: 3.5
- Fumble recoveries: 1
- Interceptions: 2
- Pass deflections: 7
- Stats at Pro Football Reference

Jordan Evans (born January 27, 1995) is an American former professional football player who was a linebacker for the Cincinnati Bengals in the National Football League (NFL). He played college football for the Oklahoma Sooners.

== College career ==
Evans attended and played college football at the University of Oklahoma. He contributed from 2013 to 2016. On October 3, 2015, against West Virginia, he recorded a fumble recovery, which he took 41 yards for a touchdown. In 2016, Evans was named first-team All-Big 12 by the league's coaches and the AP.

=== College statistics ===
Year	School	Conf	Class	Pos	G	Tackles					Interceptions					Fumbles			
Year	School	Conf	Class	Pos	G	Solo	Ast	Tot	Loss	Sk	Int	Yds	Avg	TD	PD	FR	Yds	TD	FF
2013	Oklahoma	Big 12	FR	LB	2	6	6	12	0.5	0.0	0	0	0.0	0	1	0	0	0	0
2014	Oklahoma	Big 12	SO	LB	13	56	37	93	6.5	0.0	1	0	0.0	0	3	1	0	0	2
2015	Oklahoma	Big 12	JR	LB	10	47	31	78	4.5	1.0	0	0	0.0	0	4	1	41	1	1
2016	Oklahoma	Big 12	SR	LB	13	55	43	98	9.5	2.5	4	145	36.3	2	8	1	0	0	1
Career					38	164	117	281	21.0	3.5	5	145	29.0	2	16	3	41	1	4

== Professional career ==
Pre-draft measurables
Height	Weight	40-yard dash	10-yard split	20-yard split	20-yard shuttle	Three-cone drill	Vertical jump	Broad jump	Bench press
6 ft 3 in (1.91 m)	232 lb (105 kg)	4.51 s	1.56 s	2.67 s	4.17 s	7.01 s	38 1/2 in (0.98 m)	9 ft 11 in (3.02 m)	19 reps
All values from Oklahoma’s Pro Day

=== Cincinnati Bengals ===
The Cincinnati Bengals selected Evans in the sixth round (193rd overall) of the 2017 NFL draft. Evans was the 23rd linebacker drafted in 2017. On May 15, 2017, the Bengals signed Evans to a four-year, $2.55 million contract that includes a signing bonus of $156,506.

External videos
- Bengals draft Jordan Evans 193rd overall

Throughout training camp, Evans competed for a roster spot against Brandon Bell, Bryson Albright, Paul Dawson, Hardy Nickerson Jr., and Marquis Flowers. Head coach Marvin Lewis named Evans a backup outside linebacker to begin the regular season, behind Nick Vigil, Vincent Rey, and Carl Lawson.

He made his professional regular season debut in the Bengals’ season-opener against the Baltimore Ravens and made one solo tackle during their 20–0 loss. Evans was inactive for the Bengals’ Week 4 victory at the Cleveland Browns due to a hamstring injury. On December 4, 2017, Evans earned his first career start in place of Vigil who was inactive due to a knee injury. Evans recorded five combined tackles during a 23–20 loss to the Pittsburgh Steelers in Week 13. In Week 14, he collected a season-high ten combined tackles (nine solo) as the Bengals lost 33–7 to the Chicago Bears. He finished his rookie season in 2017 with 38 combined tackles (27 solo) and two pass deflections in 15 games and four starts.

On January 8, 2018, the Bengals announced their decision to hire former Detroit Lions’ defensive coordinator Teryl Austin as the new defensive coordinator after it was left vacant by the departure of Paul Guenther to the Oakland Raiders. Evans entered training camp slated as a starting outside linebacker. Head coach Marvin Lewis named Evans the starting weakside linebacker to begin the regular season, alongside Vigil and middle linebacker Preston Brown. Evans started in place of Vontaze Burfict who was serving a four-game suspension.

On October 23, 2018, Evans collected a season-high 11 combined tackles (seven solo), deflected a pass, made 1.5 sacks, and made his first career interception during a 37–34 win against the Tampa Bay Buccaneers in Week 8. Evans intercepted a pass by Buccaneers’ quarterback Jameis Winston, that was intended for tight end Cameron Brate, and returned it for a seven-yard gain during the third quarter. On November 13, 2018, the Bengals announced their decision to fire defensive coordinator Teryl Austin after they lost 51–14 to the New Orleans Saints in Week 10. Head coach Marvin Lewis stated he would take over duties as defensive coordinator for the remainder of the season. He was placed on injured reserve on December 28, 2018 with an ankle injury. He finished his second season fifth on the team with 61 tackles through 14 games and five starts.

Evans was placed on the reserve/COVID-19 list by the team on November 7, 2020, and was activated on November 11.

Evans re-signed with the Bengals on a one-year contract on March 28, 2021. He was placed on injured reserve on October 11, 2021 after suffering a torn ACL in Week 5.

=== Seattle Sea Dragons ===
On November 17, 2022, Evans was drafted by the Seattle Sea Dragons of the XFL. He was placed on the reserve list by the team on April 13, 2023. The Sea Dragons folded when the XFL and United States Football League (USFL) merged to create the United Football League (UFL).

=== DC Defenders ===
On January 5, 2024, Evans was selected by the DC Defenders during the 2024 UFL dispersal draft. He was waived on March 21. Evans announced his retirement from professional football on April 21.

== Personal life ==
His father Scott Evans played college football at Oklahoma and for the Phoenix Cardinals in the NFL. His sister, Jacie Evans, played college basketball at Harding and his sister, Jessika Evans, played college basketball at Tulsa. He earned his Masters degree from Kelley School of Business at Indiana University Bloomington.
