= Steve Sweeney =

Steve Sweeney may refer to:

- Steve Sweeney (comedian), American comedian
- Steve Sweeney (journalist), videojournalist for Russia Today
- Steve Sweeney (American football), played for California Golden Bears and Oakland Raiders
- Stephen Sweeney, New Jersey politician
- Steve Sweeney (actor), actor in movies including the 1997 film Nil by Mouth
