= 2015 Armed Forces Bowl (December) =

American college football game

2015 Lockheed Martin Armed Forces Bowl
- 13th Armed Forces Bowl
California Golden Bears	Air Force Falcons
(7–5)	(8–5)
Pac-12	Mountain West
55	36
Head coach: Sonny Dykes	Head coach: Troy Calhoun
	1	2	3	4	Total
California	14	21	17	3	55
Air Force	7	14	8	7	36
- Date: December 29, 2015
- Season: 2015
- Stadium: Amon G. Carter Stadium
- Location: Fort Worth, Texas
- MVP: Jared Goff (Cal-QB); Karson Roberts (AF-QB)
- Favorite: California by 7½
- Referee: Matt Loeffler (SEC)
- Attendance: 38,915
- Payout: US$TBD

United States TV coverage
- Network: ESPN/RedVoice LLC
- Announcers: Dave Flemming, Mike Bellotti, & Allison Williams (ESPN); Brian Estridge, John Denton, Rob Best, & Landry Burdine (RedVoice)

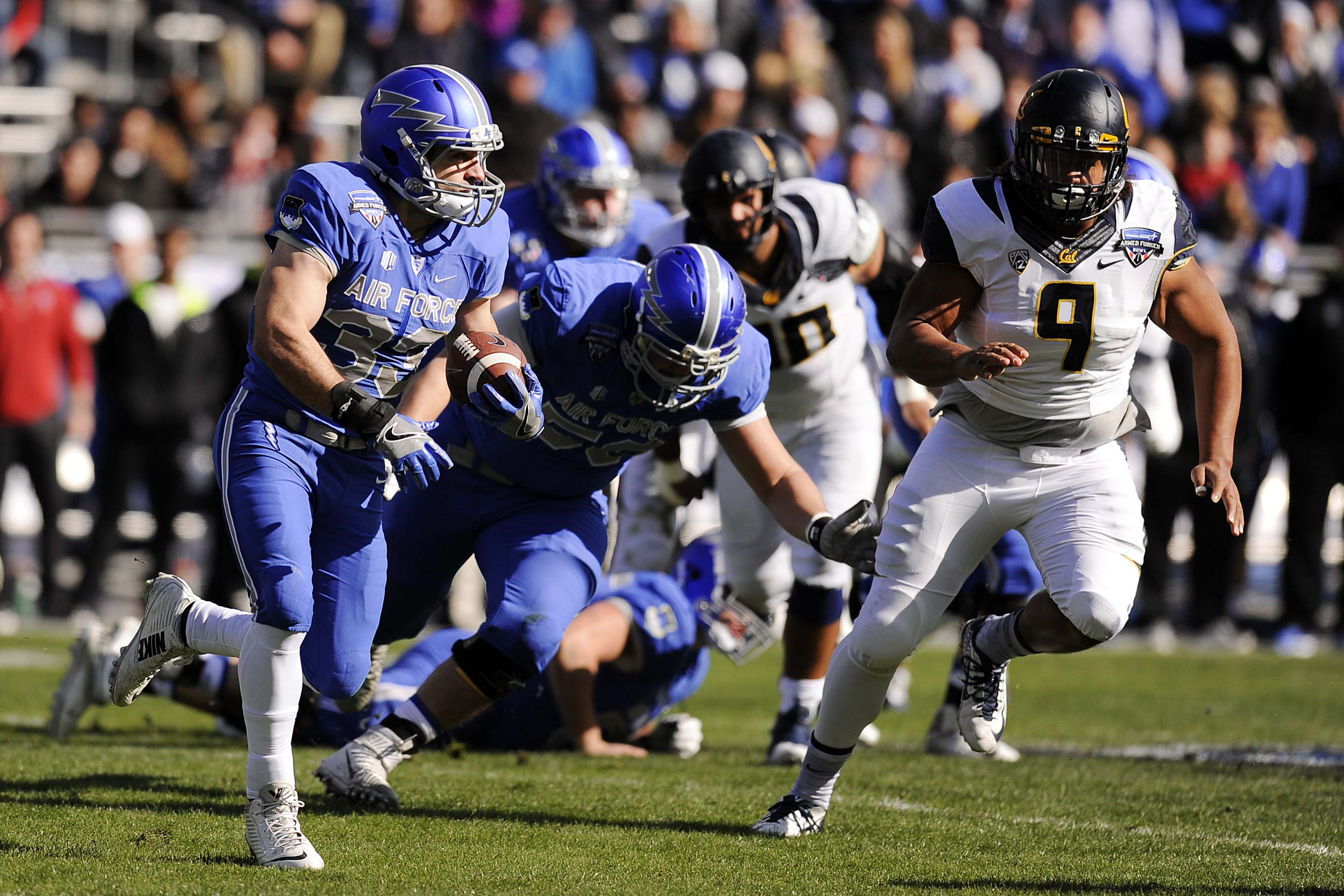
The Air Force Falcons & Cal Golden Bears in 2015

The 2015 Armed Forces Bowl was a post-season American college football bowl game played on December 29, 2015, at Amon G. Carter Stadium on the campus of Texas Christian University in Fort Worth, Texas. The 13th edition of the Armed Forces Bowl featured the California Golden Bears of the Pac-12 Conference against the Air Force Falcons of the Mountain West Conference. It began at 2:03 p.m. CST and aired on ESPN. It was one of the 2015–16 bowl games that concluded the 2015 FBS football season. The game was officially named the Lockheed Martin Armed Forces Bowl after its corporate sponsor Lockheed Martin.

== Teams ==
The game featured the California Golden Bears against the Air Force Falcons. It was a rematch of the 2007 Armed Forces Bowl (the first for both teams), which saw California defeat Air Force by a score of 42–36.

=== California Golden Bears ===
After finishing their regular season 7–5, the Golden Bears accepted their invitation to play in the game.

This was the Golden Bears' second Armed Forces Bowl.

=== Air Force Falcons ===
After finishing their regular season 8–5, the Falcons accepted their invitation to play in the game.

This was the Falcons' fifth Armed Forces Bowl, giving them the new record for most appearances in the game. Their overall record in the Armed Forces Bowl is 1–3; in addition to their aforementioned loss to California in the 2007 game, they also lost the 2008 Armed Forces Bowl to Houston 34–28, won the 2009 Armed Forces Bowl over Houston 47–20, and lost the 2012 Armed Forces Bowl to Rice 33–14.

== Game summary ==
=== Scoring summary ===
Scoring summary

Quarter	Time	Drive			Team	Scoring information	Score	
Quarter	Time	Plays	Yards	TOP	Team	Scoring information	CAL	AF
1	8:33	11	68	6:27	AF	Jacobi Owens 1-yard touchdown run, Luke Strebel kick good	0	7
1	5:46	7	65	2:47	CAL	Vic Enwere 1-yard touchdown run, Matt Anderson kick good	7	7
1	0:02	2	47	0:27	CAL	Bryce Treggs 30-yard touchdown reception from Jared Goff, Matt Anderson kick good	14	7
2	12:39	5	59	2:23	AF	Tyler Williams 16-yard touchdown run, Luke Strebel kick good	14	14
2	7:37	7	81	2:01	CAL	Darius Powe 5-yard touchdown reception from Jared Goff, Matt Anderson kick good	21	14
2	7:16	1	24	0:08	CAL	Kenny Lawler 24-yard touchdown reception from Jared Goff, Matt Anderson kick good	28	14
2	3:04	10	64	4:03	AF	Karson Roberts 1-yard touchdown run, Luke Strebel kick good	28	21
2	2:00	3	78	0:57	CAL	Kenny Lawler 14-yard touchdown reception from Jared Goff, Matt Anderson kick good	35	21
3	11:04	9	76	3:49	CAL	Darius Powe 12-yard touchdown reception from Jared Goff, Matt Anderson kick good	42	21
3	2:44	10	68	3:41	CAL	29-yard field goal by Matt Anderson	45	21
3	1:30	3	69	1:05	AF	Timothy McVey 57-yard touchdown reception from Karson Roberts, 2-point pass from Karson Roberts to Jacobi Owens good	45	29
3	0:17	3	61	1:04	CAL	Kenny Lawler 25-yard touchdown reception from Jared Goff, Matt Anderson kick good	52	29
4	9:14	7	52	2:00	AF	Jale Robinette 15-yard touchdown reception from Karson Roberts, Luke Strebel kick good	52	36
4	1:13	14	53	7:54	CAL	30-yard field goal by Matt Anderson	55	36
"TOP" = time of possession. For other American football terms, see Glossary of American football.							55	36

=== Statistics ===
Statistics	CAL	AF
First downs	27	23
Total offense, plays – yards	71–586	68–434
Rushes-yards (net)	34–119	53–285
Passing yards (net)	467	149
Passes, Comp-Att-Int	25–37–0	7–15–1
Time of Possession	28:53	31:07
