= Hardy Nickerson Jr. =

American football player (born 1994)

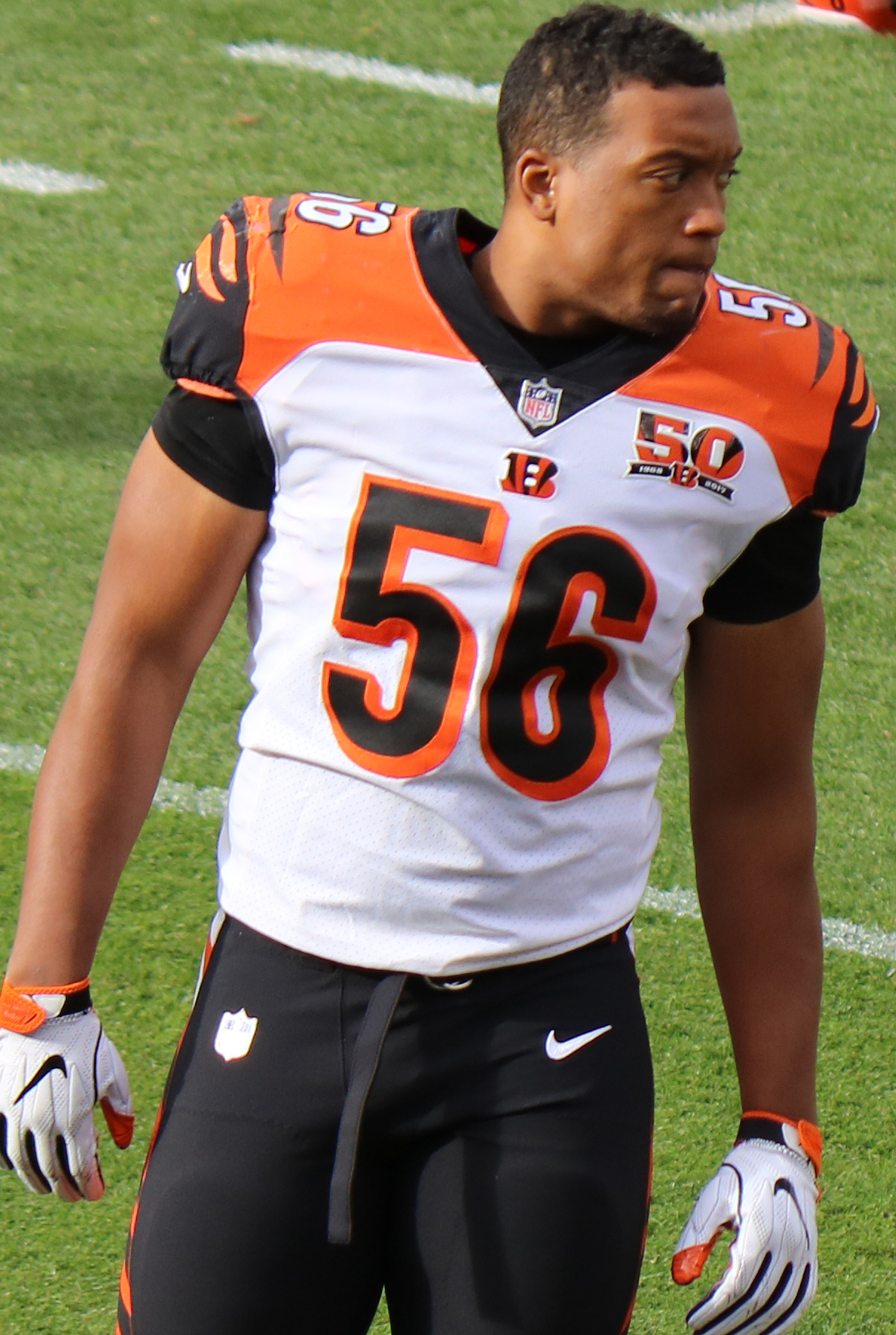
- Nickerson with the Cincinnati Bengals in 2017

No. 56, 47
- Position: Linebacker

Personal information
- Born: January 5, 1994 (age 32); Oakland, California, U.S.
- Listed height: 6 ft 0 in (1.83 m)
- Listed weight: 235 lb (107 kg)

Career information
- High school: Bishop O'Dowd (Oakland)
- College: California; Illinois
- NFL draft: 2017: undrafted

Career history
- Cincinnati Bengals (2017–2019); Minnesota Vikings (2020); Houston Texans (2021)

Career NFL statistics
- Total tackles: 97
- Forced fumbles: 3
- Interceptions: 1
- Stats at Pro Football Reference

Hardy William Lindsay Nickerson (born January 5, 1994) is an American former professional football player who was a linebacker in the National Football League (NFL). He played college football for three years for the California Golden Bears and was a grad-transfer for the Illinois Fighting Illini, where he played for his father Hardy Nickerson.

== Professional career ==
Pre-draft measurables
Height	Weight	Arm length	Hand span	40-yard dash	10-yard split	20-yard split	20-yard shuttle	Three-cone drill	Vertical jump	Broad jump	Bench press
5 ft 11 5/8 in (1.82 m)	232 lb (105 kg)	32 in (0.81 m)	10 in (0.25 m)	4.78 s	1. 62 s	2.73 s	4.38 s	7.30 s	33 in (0.84 m)	9 ft 8 in (2.95 m)	18 reps
All values from NFL Combine / Pro Day

=== Cincinnati Bengals ===
==== 2017 ====
Nickerson went undrafted during the 2017 NFL draft. On April 30, 2017, the Cincinnati Bengals signed Nickerson to a three-year, $1.66 million contract.

Throughout training camp, Nickerson competed for a roster spot against Brandon Bell, Bryson Albright, Paul Dawson, Jordan Evans, and Marquis Flowers. Head coach Marvin Lewis named Nickerson a backup middle linebacker to begin the regular season, behind Kevin Minter .

He made his professional regular season debut during the Cincinnati Bengals' season-opening 20–0 loss against the Baltimore Ravens. On September 28, 2017, the Bengals waived Nickerson and was signed him to their practice squad the next day. On October 16, 2017, the Cincinnati Bengals promoted Nickerson to their active roster. On November 14, 2017, the Cincinnati Bengals waived Nickerson, but re-signed him to the practice squad the next day. On November 18, 2017, Nickerson was promoted back to the active roster. On December 17, 2017, Nickerson earned his first career start after Vontaze Burfict and Kevin Minter sustained injuries. Nickerson recorded five combined tackles in his first career start as the Bengals lost at the Minnesota Vikings 34–7 in Week 15. In Week 17, he collected a season-high seven solo tackles and deflected a pass during a 31–27 victory at the Baltimore Ravens. He finished his rookie season in 2017 with 18 combined tackles (12 solo) and one pass deflection in 14 games and two starts.

==== 2018 ====
On January 8, 2018, the Cincinnati Bengals announced their decision to hire former Detroit Lions' defensive coordinator Teryl Austin as the new defensive coordinator after it was left vacant by the departure of Paul Guenther to the Oakland Raiders. Nickerson entered training camp slated as a backup middle linebacker. He was named the backup middle linebacker to start the regular season, behind Preston Brown. In Week 11, Nickerson collected a season-high 11 combined tackles (eight solo) during a 24–21 loss at the Baltimore Ravens.

==== 2019 ====
On September 1, 2019, Nickerson was waived by the Bengals and re-signed to the practice squad. He was promoted to the active roster on November 15, 2019.

=== Minnesota Vikings ===
Nickerson was signed by the Minnesota Vikings on August 18, 2020. He was waived on September 6, 2020, and re-signed to the practice squad two days later. He was elevated to the active roster on September 12 for the team's week 1 game against the Green Bay Packers, and reverted to the practice squad after the game. He was promoted to the active roster on September 22, 2020. He was waived on December 1, 2020, and re-signed to the practice squad two days later. He was promoted to the active roster again on December 12. In Week 16 against the New Orleans Saints on Christmas Day, Nickerson recorded his first career interception off a pass thrown by Drew Brees during the 52–33 loss.

=== Houston Texans ===
Nickerson signed with the Houston Texans on March 22, 2021. He was released on August 31, 2021, and re-signed to the practice squad. He was released on September 8, but he re-signed on September 21. The Texans signed him to their active roster on November 3. He was placed on injured reserve on November 20.

== Personal life ==
His father Hardy Nickerson is a former linebacker who played 16 seasons in the National Football League as a member of the Steelers, Buccaneers, Jaguars, and Packers. He was five-time Pro Bowl selection, four-time All-Pro selection and is a member on the NFL 1990s All-Decade Team.
