= Bobby Shaw =

American football player (born 1975)

No. 82, 81, 83
- Position: Wide receiver

Personal information
- Born: April 23, 1975 (age 51); San Francisco, California, U.S.
- Listed height: 6 ft 1 in (1.85 m)
- Listed weight: 185 lb (84 kg)

Career information
- High school: Galileo (San Francisco, California)
- College: California
- NFL draft: 1998: 6th round, 169th overall pick

Career history
- Seattle Seahawks (1998); Pittsburgh Steelers (1998–2001); Jacksonville Jaguars (2002); Buffalo Bills (2003–2004); San Diego Chargers (2004); Seattle Seahawks (2005)*
- * Offseason or practice squad member only

Awards and highlights
- Third-team All-American (1997); 2× First-team All-Pac-10 (1996, 1997)

Career NFL statistics
- Receptions: 197
- Receiving yards: 2,784
- Receiving touchdowns: 14
- Stats at Pro Football Reference

Bobby T. Shaw II (born April 23, 1975) is an American former professional football player who was a wide receiver in the National Football League (NFL). He played college football for the California Golden Bears, earning third-team All-American honors in 1997. Shaw played for five NFL teams: Seattle Seahawks, Pittsburgh Steelers, Jacksonville Jaguars, Buffalo Bills, and San Diego Chargers.

Shaw attended Galileo High School and attended the University of California, Berkeley. He graduated from Cal as the school's all-time leader in receptions with 180 catches for 2,731 yards and 27 touchdowns.

In 1996, Steve Mariucci became the Golden Bears' head coach. Shaw prospered under Mariucci, with 12 catches for 168 yards in a game against UCLA and three touchdowns scores in a 48-42 triple-overtime win over Oregon State. In the Aloha Bowl following that season, Shaw scored twice on passes from Pat Barnes in Cal's 42–38 loss to Navy. Shaw was named first-team All-Pac-10 for his performance that year.

In 1997, Shaw became captain on Tom Holmoe's first team. He set single-season records with 74 receptions for 1,093 yards and 11 touchdowns. It was a tough year for Cal, but Shaw helped deliver one of the Bears' three wins with 158 yards and 2 touchdowns in a 40–36 win over Oklahoma. He was again voted to the All-Pac-10 first team, and became the third Cal wide receiver to win first-team All-America honors from Sporting News. UCLA Head Coach Bob Toledo had stated "(he's) the best receiver in the conference, one of the best in the country, and he'll end up being the best receiver in Cal history."

Shaw was selected in the sixth round of the 1998 NFL draft by the Seattle Seahawks. He signed later that year with the Pittsburgh Steelers, and played six years with the Steelers, Jaguars, Bills, and Chargers. He currently resides in California.
