= Concord High School (California) =

Public high school in California, United States

Location
- 4200 Concord Boulevard; Concord, California 94521-1059; United States; 37°58′40″N 121°59′15″W

Information
- School type: Public high school
- Motto: Home of the Bears
- Founded: 1966
- School district: Mount Diablo Unified School District
- Superintendent: Adam Clark
- Principal: Julene MacKinnon
- Faculty: 61.26 (FTE)
- Grades: 9-12
- Enrollment: 1,118 (2023-2024)
- Student to teacher ratio: 18.25
- Campus size: 144,373 sq ft (13,412.7 m^{2})
- Colors: Green and gold
- Mascot: Bears
- Website: Concord High School

Concord High School is a 9–12 comprehensive public high school in Concord, California, United States. It is one of the six high schools in the Mount Diablo Unified School District. Concord High School was constructed in 1966 and currently provides 144,373 square feet (13,412.7 m^{2}) in permanent structure, including about 70 classrooms, a library, and other structures. As of 2023, the current principal is Julene MacKinnon.

== Academics ==
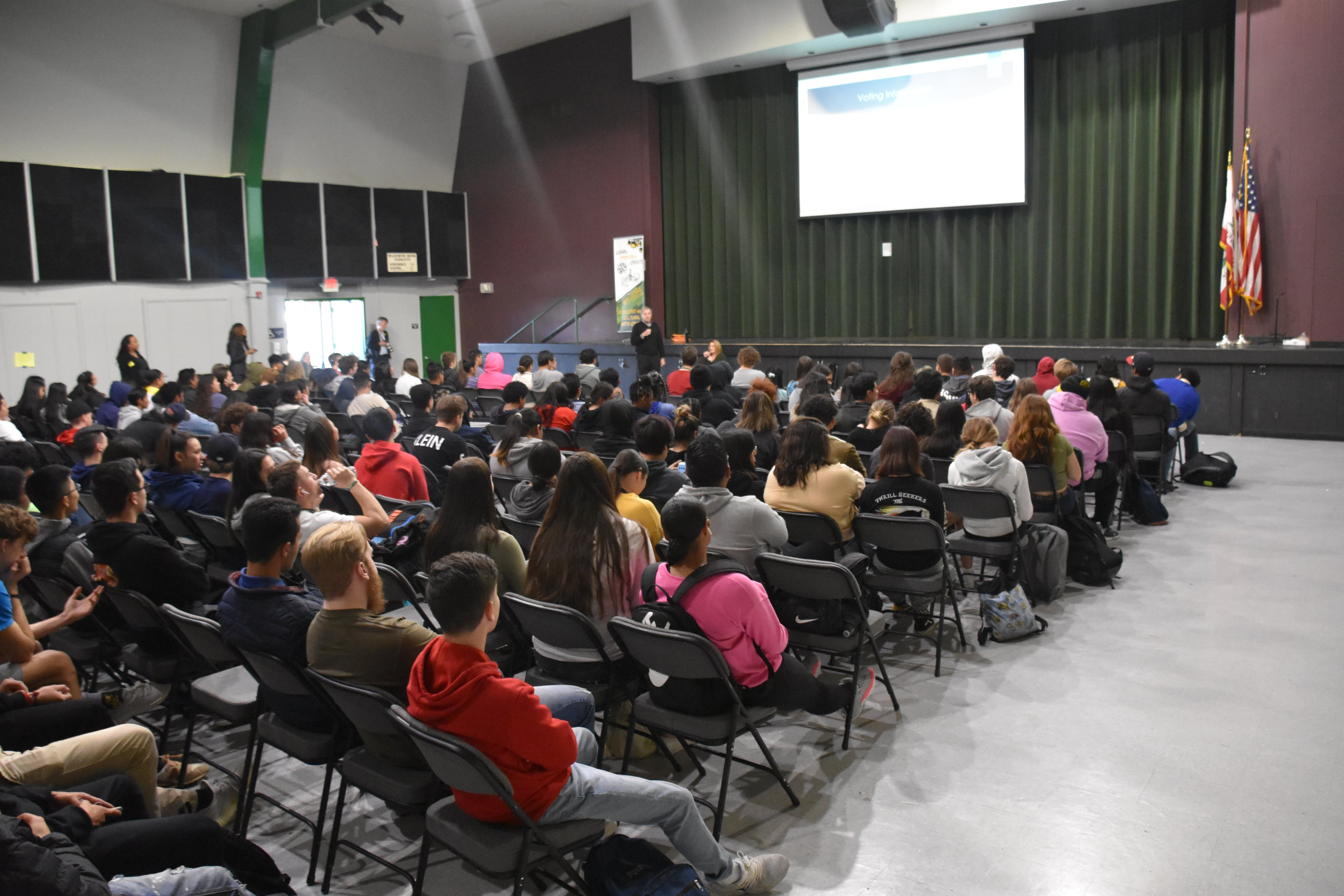
Congressmember Mark DeSaulnier hosting a town hall with students at Concord High School in 2020.

Concord High offers many course choices, including over 18 AP/honors courses. The school once offered many foreign languages, including Spanish, French, German, and American Sign Language, but German and French were discontinued.

The school also features several visual and performing arts classes that include Art, Ceramics, Photography, Creative Writing, Vocal Music II, III, an A Capella group, Symphonic Band, Orchestra, Jazz Ensemble, and Marching Band.

Concord High, in partnership with the Contra Costa County Office of Education and their ROP classes, also has a Robotics class.

=== CHS Academy ===
The CHS Academy is a Health and Human Services California Partnership Academy located on the Concord campus and available for 10th, 11th, and 12th grade students. Academy students take their core class with the same classmates for the entire school year, but also take some classes with the general student population.

Academy curriculum focuses on preparing students for life after high school with an emphasis on health and human services fields such as medicine, psychology, and social work. Academy students are automatically enrolled in special elective courses to complement the focus of the Academy. Sophomores take Career Transitions, which focuses on exploring interests and various career fields in the health sector. Juniors take Psychology within the academy, and, in addition to regular classes, attend a Career Explorations class at Diablo Valley College in the spring. Seniors take Sociology, with a focus on looking at modern society in regards to a variety of topics, from homelessness and health issues, to dissecting advertisements in the media. Students in the academy attend many field trips throughout the year, including trips to many local colleges such as UC Davis, Berkeley, the Art Academy, and San Francisco State. Students in the academy also organize the yearly Diversity Conference, blood drives, and donation drives.

For the 2022–2023 school year, the Academy program was removed from the school due to lack of funding.

== Athletics ==
=== Fall ===
- Cross country
- Football
- Golf (girls)
- Marching band
- Tennis (girls)
- Volleyball (girls)
- Water polo
- Auxiliaries
- Cheerleading
- Flag Football (girls)

=== Winter ===
- Basketball
- Soccer
- Winter percussion
- Winterguard
- Wrestling
- Stunt

=== Spring ===
- Baseball
- Golf (boys)
- Softball
- Swimming
- Tennis (boys)
- Track & field
- Volleyball (boys)
- Auxiliaries (training clinics)

== Notable alumni ==
- Carlos Alazraqui – voice actor; played Deputy Garcia on Reno 911!
- Dave Barr – former professional football player; quarterback for the University of California
- Tom Candiotti – former professional baseball player
- Bonnie-Jill Laflin – former NBA and NFL cheerleader; model and actress
- Jon Weisberg – former bassist of the band From First to Last
