= Daniel Lasco =

American football player (born 1992)

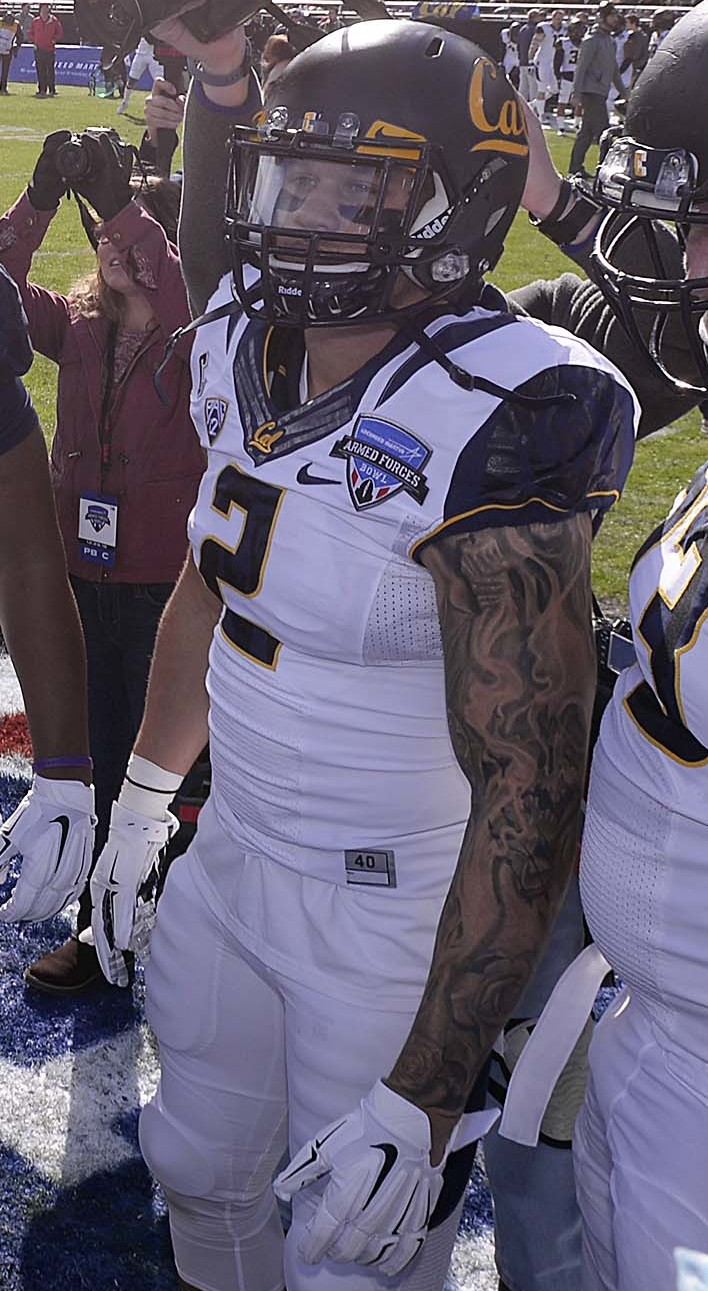
- Lasco with Cal at the 2015 Armed Forces Bowl

No. 36
- Position: Running back

Personal information
- Born: October 9, 1992 (age 34); The Woodlands, Texas, U.S.
- Listed height: 6 ft 0 in (1.83 m)
- Listed weight: 211 lb (96 kg)

Career information
- High school: The Woodlands
- College: California
- NFL draft: 2016: 7th round, 237th overall pick

Career history
- New Orleans Saints (2016–2018)

Career NFL statistics
- Rushing attempts: 11
- Rushing yards: 32
- Receptions: 2
- Receiving yards: 11
- Stats at Pro Football Reference

Daniel Lee Lasco II (born October 9, 1992) is an American former professional football player who was a running back for the New Orleans Saints of the National Football League (NFL). He played college football for the California Golden Bears.

== Early life ==
Lasco attended The Woodlands High School in The Woodlands, Texas. He started as the Highlander's running back for three seasons and lettered for all four, becoming the first freshman to score a varsity touchdown in his school's history. During his career he rushed for 3,821 yards and 43 touchdowns, breaking his high school records for most career rushing yards and touchdowns. He committed to the University of California, Berkeley to play college football over offers from Arkansas, Iowa, Miami (FL), Notre Dame, Texas A&M, and TCU.

== College career ==
After redshirting his first year at California in 2011, Lasco played in all 12 games as a redshirt freshman in 2012 and had 109 rushing yards on 8 carries with a touchdown. As a sophomore in 2013, he played in eight games and had 67 carries for 317 with two touchdowns. As a junior in 2014, he started 11 of 12 games and rushed for 1,115 yards on 210 carries with 12 touchdowns. In nine games during his senior year in 2015, Lasco rushed for 331 yards on 65 carries and three touchdowns.

== Professional career ==
At the 2016 NFL Combine, Lasco had an 11-foot, three inch broad jump which set the combine record for a running back since 2006.

Pre-draft measurables
Height	Weight	40-yard dash	10-yard split	20-yard split	20-yard shuttle	Three-cone drill	Vertical jump	Broad jump	Bench press
6 ft 0 in (1.83 m)	209 lb (95 kg)	4.46 s	1.54 s	2.57 s	4.26 s	7.22 s	41 1/2 in (1.05 m)	11 ft 3 in (3.43 m)	23 reps
All values from NFL Combine

In the 2016 NFL draft, Lasco was selected by the New Orleans Saints in the seventh round with the 237th overall pick. On May 9, 2016, the Saints signed Lasco to a four-year deal.

On September 8, 2017, Lasco was waived by the Saints and was re-signed to the practice squad. He was promoted to the active roster on October 17. In Week 10, Lasco was taken off the field in an ambulance with a spine injury after making a headfirst tackle on a kickoff return. He was diagnosed with a bulging disc in his spine and was placed on injured reserve on November 14.

On July 18, 2018, Lasco was waived by the Saints with a failed physical and was placed on the reserve/physically unable to perform list.

On March 6, 2019, Lasco was released by the Saints.
