= 1999 California Golden Bears football team =

American college football season

1999 California Golden Bears football
- Conference: Pacific-10 Conference
- Record: 0–7, 4 wins vacated (0–5 Pac-10, 3 wins vacated)
- Head coach: Tom Holmoe (3rd season)
- Offensive coordinator: Steve Hagen (1st season)
- Defensive coordinator: Lyle Setencich (3rd season)
- Home stadium: California Memorial Stadium

1999 Pacific-10 Conference football standings
	Conf.			Overall
Team	W		L	W		L
Stanford $	7	–	1	8	–	4
No. 19 Oregon	6	–	2	9	–	3
Washington	6	–	2	7	–	5
Arizona State	5	–	3	6	–	6
Oregon State	4	–	4	7	–	5
Arizona	3	–	5	6	–	6
USC	3	–	5	6	–	6
California	3	–	5	4	–	7
UCLA	2	–	6	4	–	7
Washington State	1	–	7	3	–	9
$ – BCS representative as conference champion; Cal later vacated 4 wins (3 in conference) due to NCAA sanctions.; Rankings from AP Poll

The 1999 California Golden Bears football team was an American football team that represented the University of California, Berkeley as a member of the Pacific-10 Conference (Pac-10) during the 1999 NCAA Division I-A football season. In their third year under head coach Tom Holmoe, the Golden Bears compiled an overall record of 4–7 record with a mark of 3–5 against conference opponents, placing in a three-way tie for sixth in the Pac-10, and were outscored by opponents 254 to 180. The team played home games at California Memorial Stadium in Berkeley, California.

California was later forced to vacate all four wins from the 1999 season for altering the grades of two players.

The team's statistical leaders included Kyle Boller with 1,303 passing yards, Joe Igber with 694 rushing yards, and Michael Ainsworth with 499 receiving yards.

== Schedule ==
Date	Time	Opponent	Site	TV	Result	Attendance
September 4	2:30 p.m.	Rutgers*	California Memorial Stadium; Berkeley, CA	FSNBA	W 21–7 (vacated)	35,200
September 11	12:30 p.m.	at No. 5 Nebraska*	Memorial Stadium; Lincoln, NE	ABC	L 0–45	77,617
September 25	2:30 p.m.	Arizona State	California Memorial Stadium; Berkeley, CA		W 24–23 (vacated)	44,500
October 2	1:00 p.m.	at Washington State	Martin Stadium; Pullman, WA		L 7–31	27,682
October 9	4:00 p.m.	at No. 24 BYU*	Cougar Stadium; Provo, UT	ABC	L 28–38	65,617
October 16	12:30 p.m.	at UCLA	Rose Bowl; Pasadena, CA (rivalry)	ABC	W 17–0 (vacated)	55,559
October 23	12:30 p.m.	Washington	California Memorial Stadium; Berkeley, CA		L 27–31	43,000
October 30	3:30 p.m.	USC	California Memorial Stadium; Berkeley, CA	FSN	W 17–7 (vacated)	54,000
November 6	3:30 p.m.	at Oregon State	Reser Stadium; Corvallis, OR	FSN	L 7–17	35,520
November 13	12:30 p.m.	No. 10 Oregon	California Memorial Stadium; Berkeley, CA		L 19–24	38,000
November 20	12:30 p.m.	at Stanford	Stanford Stadium; Stanford, CA (Big Game)	FSN	L 13–31	80,746
*Non-conference game; Rankings from AP Poll released prior to the game; All times are in Pacific time

== Game summaries ==
=== USC ===
Team	1	2	3	4	Total
USC	0	0	7	0	7
• California	0	7	3	7	17

- Date: October 30
- Location: California Memorial Stadium, Berkeley, California
- Game attendance: 54,000

Scoring summary
2	2:39	CAL	Deltha O'Neal 67 yard interception return (Mark-Christian Jensen kick)	California 7–0
3	10:44	CAL	Mark-Christian Jensen 37 yard field goal	California 10–0
3	6:08	USC	Kareem Kelly 72 yard pass from John Fox (David Newbury kick)	California 10–7
4	14:53	CAL	Ronnie Davenport 33 yard pass from Kyle Boller (Mark-Christian Jensen kick)	California 17–7

== Roster ==
1999 California Golden Bears football team roster
Players
Coaches
Offense

Pos.	#	Name	Class
WR	3	Michael Ainsworth	Fr
QB	7	Kyle Boller	Sr
WR	9	Ronnie Davenport	Fr
WR	15	Omar Bennett	Fr

Defense

Pos.	#	Name	Class
CB	8	Deltha O'Neal	Sr
S	20	Peter Destefano	Sr
LB	43	Jamal Cherry	So
LB	46	Tully Banta-Cain	Fr
LB	49	Scott Fujita	So
ILB	59	Matt Beck	Sr
DT	94	Jacob Waasdorp	Jr
DE	97	Andre Carter	Jr
DE	98	Jerry DeLoach	Sr

Special teams

Pos.	#	Name	Class
P	89	Nick Harris	Jr

Head coach

- Tom Holmoe

Coordinators/assistant coaches

Legend

- (C) Team captain
- (S) Suspended
- (I) Ineligible
- Injured
- Redshirt

Roster
Last update: 2001-04-17
