= Brian Treggs =

American football player (born 1970)

No. 21
- Position: Wide receiver

Personal information
- Born: June 11, 1970 (age 56); Los Angeles, California, U.S.
- Listed height: 5 ft 9 in (1.75 m)
- Listed weight: 161 lb (73 kg)

Career information
- High school: Carson (Carson, California)
- College: California
- NFL draft: 1992: undrafted

Career history
- Seattle Seahawks (1992)

Awards and highlights
- Second-team All-Pac-10 (1990)
- Stats at Pro Football Reference

Brian Allen Treggs (born June 11, 1970) is an American former professional football player who was a wide receiver who played one season with the Seattle Seahawks of the National Football League (NFL). He played college football for the California Golden Bears.

== Early life ==
Treggsand attended Carson High School in Carson, California.

== College career ==
Treggs attended the University of California, Berkeley, and played for the Golden Bears from 1988 to 1991. He finished his college career as the Cal's all-time leader in receiving yards with 2,335 and receptions with 167. He also recorded fifteen receiving touchdowns. Treggs earned second-team All-Pac-10 honors his junior year. He also garnered honorable mention All-Pac-10 accolades as a sophomore and senior. He was inducted into the Cal Athletic Hall of Fame in 2015. Treggs received his legal studies degree from Berkeley in 1992.

== Professional career ==
Treggs signed with the Seattle Seahawks of the NFL in 1992 and played in two games for the team during the 1992 season.

== Personal life ==
Treggs' son, Philadelphia Eagles wide receiver Bryce Treggs, also played for the California Golden Bears. Brian works in law. He also coaches football at St. John Bosco High School in Bellflower, California.
