= Chris Harper (wide receiver, born 1993) =

American football player (born 1993)

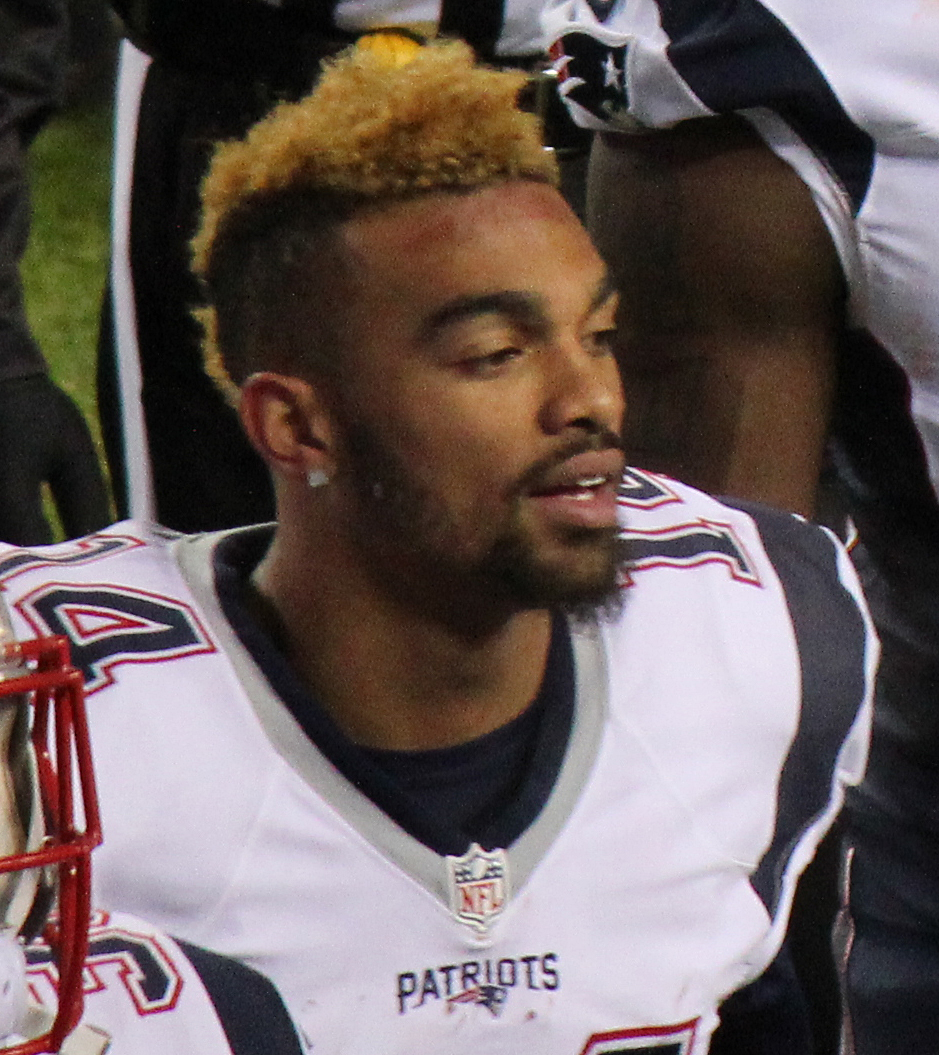
- Harper with the New England Patriots in 2015

No. 14
- Position: Wide receiver

Personal information
- Born: December 7, 1993 (age 32); Encino, California, U.S.
- Listed height: 5 ft 11 in (1.80 m)
- Listed weight: 185 lb (84 kg)

Career information
- High school: Crespi Carmelite (Encino)
- College: California
- NFL draft: 2015: undrafted

Career history
- New England Patriots (2015); San Francisco 49ers (2016); New York Jets (2017)*; Toronto Argonauts (2018)*; Montreal Alouettes (2018)
- * Offseason or practice squad member only

Career NFL statistics
- Receptions: 14
- Receiving yards: 139
- Stats at Pro Football Reference

Career CFL statistics
- Receptions: 7
- Receiving yards: 62
- Receiving touchdowns: 1
- Stats at CFL.ca

Christopher James Harper (born December 7, 1993) is an American former professional football player who was a wide receiver in the National Football League (NFL) and Canadian Football League (CFL). He was signed by the New England Patriots as an undrafted free agent following the 2015 NFL draft. He played college football for the California Golden Bears.

== College career ==
At the University of California, Berkeley, Harper was Cal's most productive receiver over his 35 games played and 23 starts during his three seasons with the program from 2012–14. He entered the 2015 NFL draft as an underclassman, forgoing his final season of eligibility.

== Professional career ==
Pre-draft measurables
Height	Weight	Arm length	Hand span	40-yard dash	10-yard split	20-yard split	20-yard shuttle	Three-cone drill	Vertical jump	Broad jump	Bench press
5 ft 10 3/4 in (1.80 m)	182 lb (83 kg)	31 7/8 in (0.81 m)	9 1/8 in (0.23 m)	4.53 s	1.59 s	2.62 s	4.36 s	7.03 s	35.0 in (0.89 m)	10 ft 0 in (3.05 m)	11 reps
All values from Pro Day

=== New England Patriots ===
Harper went undrafted, but signed with the New England Patriots on May 5, 2015 as an undrafted free agent. Harper made the Patriots initial 53-man roster and played in the first game of the 2015 season but was cut by the team on September 15, 2015. Harper was resigned to the Patriots' practice squad on September 17, 2015. On November 17, 2015, following an injury to Julian Edelman, the Patriots signed Harper from the practice squad to the 53-man roster.

On November 30, 2015, the Patriots waived Harper after a costly muffed punt in the snow against the Denver Broncos the day before. On December 2, 2015, the New England Patriots signed Harper to the practice squad. On December 26, the Patriots again promoted Harper to the 53-man roster.

On January 3, 2016, Harper caught his first pass for 6 yards against the Miami Dolphins.

On September 3, 2016, Harper was released by the Patriots as part of final roster cuts.

=== San Francisco 49ers ===
On September 5, 2016, Harper was signed to the San Francisco 49ers practice squad. On September 12, 2016, he was promoted to the active roster. The next day, he was released by the 49ers and was re-signed to the teams' practice squad the following day. Harper was promoted back to the active roster on November 8, 2016. On May 2, 2017, Harper was waived by the 49ers.

=== New York Jets ===
Harper was signed by the New York Jets on May 30, 2017. He was waived on September 1, 2017.

=== Toronto Argonauts ===
Harper was signed by the Toronto Argonauts on April 12, 2018. He was released on June 9, 2018.

=== Montreal Alouettes ===
Harper was signed to the practice roster of the Montreal Alouettes on June 13, 2018. He was promoted to the active roster on July 5. He was placed on injured reserve on August 1, and activated from injured reserve on September 13. Harper was released on September 17, 2018.
