= Dameane Douglas =

American football player (born 1976)

No. 82, 11
- Position: Wide receiver

Personal information
- Born: March 15, 1976 (age 50); Hanford, California, U.S.

Career information
- College: California
- NFL draft: 1999: 4th round, 106th overall pick

Career history
- Oakland Raiders (1999)*; Philadelphia Eagles (1999–2002); Kansas City Chiefs (2003); Washington Redskins (2004)*
- * Offseason or practice squad member only

Awards and highlights
- First-team All-Pac-10 (1998)

Career NFL statistics
- Receptions: 14
- Receiving yards: 165
- Receiving touchdowns: 3
- Stats at Pro Football Reference

Dameane Douglas (born March 15, 1976) is an American former professional football player who was a wide receiver in the National Football League (NFL). He played college football for the California Golden Bears and was selected by the Oakland Raiders in the fourth round of the 1999 NFL draft. At Cal, Douglas set a school record 100 receptions in the 1998 season. Douglas played four seasons with the Philadelphia Eagles from 1999 to 2002. He was with the Kansas City Chiefs in the 2003 season but was placed on injured reserve on August 26 and subsequently released on October 13 after receiving an injury settlement.

Following football, he transitioned to a career in public service, and as of 2024 worked in Fresno as the senior field representative for Assemblyman Joaquin Arambula. His son, also named Dameane, played basketball for Loyola Marymount University from 2018-2022 and graduated with a degree in sociology.
