= Dave Barr (American football) =

American football player (born 1972)

No. 16, 12
- Position: Quarterback

Personal information
- Born: May 9, 1972 (age 54); Oakland, California, U.S.
- Listed height: 6 ft 3 in (1.91 m)
- Listed weight: 210 lb (95 kg)

Career information
- High school: Concord (Concord, California)
- College: California
- NFL draft: 1995: 4th round, 119th overall pick

Career history
- Philadelphia Eagles (1995)*; St. Louis Rams (1995); Kansas City Chiefs (1996)*; Cincinnati Bengals (1996)*; San Francisco 49ers (1997)*; Scottish Claymores (1997); New York Jets (1999)*
- * Offseason or practice squad member only

Career NFL statistics
- TD–INT: 0–0
- Passing yards: 42
- Passer rating: 67.8
- Stats at Pro Football Reference

David Hoover Barr Jr. (born May 9, 1972) is an American former professional football player who was a quarterback for two seasons in the National Football League (NFL) and the World League of American Football (WLAF). He played for the St. Louis Rams in 1995 and the Scottish Claymores in 1997. Barr was drafted by the Philadelphia Eagles in the fourth round of the 1995 NFL draft. He played college football for the California Golden Bears.

At the University of California, Berkeley, Barr earned the Joe Roth Award with the Golden Bears in 1994. He holds the Cal record for highest single-season passer rating (164.5) and ranks sixth in career passing yards, fourth in career passing touchdowns, and fifth in career total offense. Barr attended Concord High School in Concord, California, where he led the football team to the NCS 2A final, before losing to Marin Catholic at the Oakland Coliseum.
