= Tom Holmoe =

American athletic director, football player and coach (born 1960)

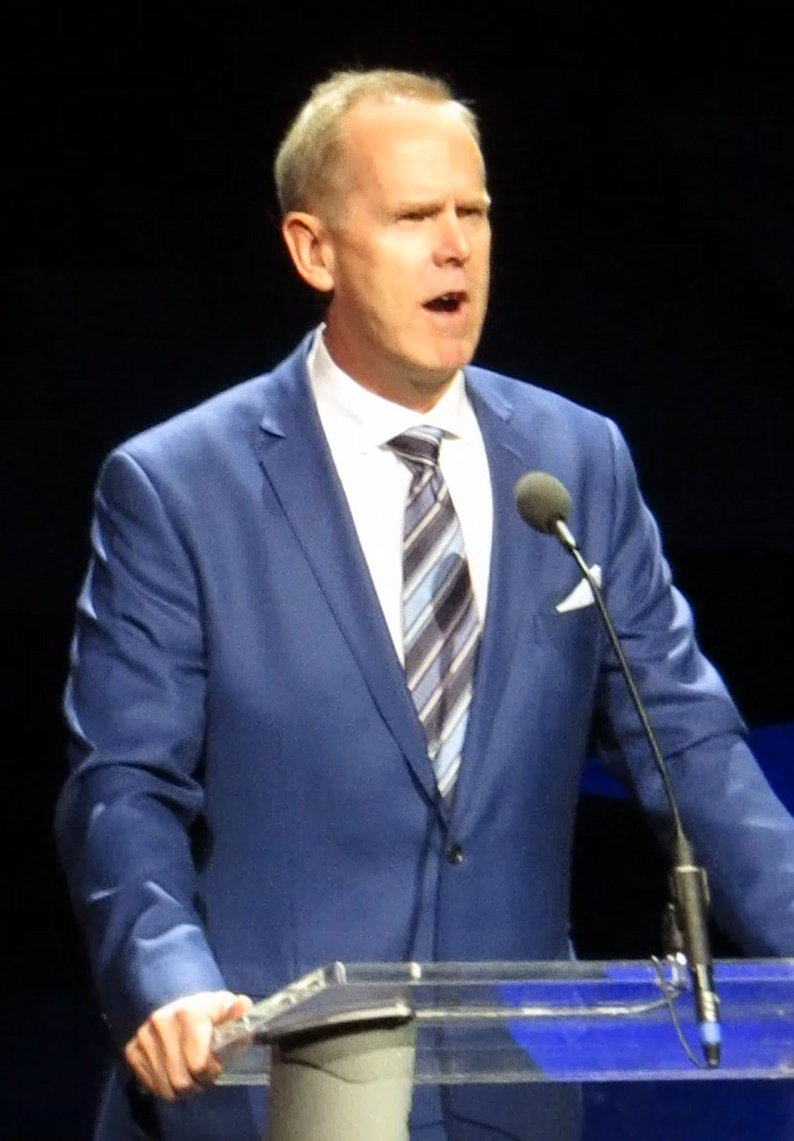
- Holmoe speaking at BYU in 2017

No. 28, 46
- Position: Safety

Personal information
- Born: March 7, 1960 (age 66); Los Angeles, California, U.S.
- Listed height: 6 ft 2 in (1.88 m)
- Listed weight: 190 lb (86 kg)

Career information
- High school: Crescenta Valley
- College: BYU
- NFL draft: 1983: 4th round, 90th overall pick

Career history

Playing
- San Francisco 49ers (1983–1989)

Coaching
- BYU (1990–1991) Graduate assistant; Stanford (1992–1993) Defensive backs coach; San Francisco 49ers (1994–1995) Defensive backs coach; California (1996) Defensive coordinator; California (1997–2001) Head coach

Operations
- BYU (2001–2005) Associate athletic director; BYU (2005–2025) Athletic director

Awards and highlights
- 4× Super Bowl champion (XIX, XXIII, XXIV, XXIX)

Career NFL statistics
- Interceptions: 7
- INT yards: 172
- Fumble recoveries: 4
- Touchdowns: 2
- Stats at Pro Football Reference

Head coaching record
- Regular season: 16–39

Thomas Allen Holmoe (born March 7, 1960) is a former American college athletics administrator and former football player and coach. He was the athletic director (AD) at Brigham Young University (BYU) from 2005 until 2025. Holmoe played college football at BYU and then professionally in the National Football League (NFL) with the San Francisco 49ers from 1983 to 1989. He served as the head football coach at the University of California, Berkeley (Cal) from 1997 to 2001.

== Playing career ==
=== College ===
Holmoe played both basketball and football at Crescenta Valley High School in La Crescenta, California. He accepted a football scholarship to BYU, where he played as a cornerback and safety from 1978 to 1982. As a sophomore in 1980, he led the Western Athletic Conference (WAC) with seven interceptions, and went on to earn all-WAC honors as a senior in 1982. The Cougars won the conference championship in each of his four seasons at BYU. At BYU, he was a teammate of Super Bowl winning quarterback Jim McMahon and Super Bowl winning coach Andy Reid.

=== Professional ===
Holmoe was drafted 90th overall in the fourth round of the 1983 NFL draft by the San Francisco 49ers. He played seven seasons for the 49ers, winning Super Bowls with the team in 1984, 1988 and 1989, before retiring due to a knee injury.

== Coaching career ==
After retiring from playing, Holmoe entered the coaching ranks, having been urged by LaVell Edwards to return to BYU as a graduate assistant. In 1992, Holmoe accepted an offer from Bill Walsh to join his staff at Stanford University as the defensive backs coach. Holmoe remained at Stanford for two seasons, helping the 1992 Stanford Cardinal football team become the Pacific-10 Conference champions with a 10–3 overall record, including a win over Penn State in the Blockbuster Bowl.

Holmoe then returned to the 49ers, serving as George Seifert's defensive backfield coach for two seasons, where he coached such players as Deion Sanders, Merton Hanks and Eric Davis. As defensive backfield coach, he won a fourth Super Bowl in 1994. In 1996, Holmoe joined the California Golden Bears staff as defensive coordinator under Steve Mariucci.

Following Mariucci's departure to the NFL in 1997, Holmoe was named his successor. Holmoe, by his own admission, was an unsuccessful head coach. During his five-year tenure at Cal, he compiled a 16–39 record overall with a 9–31 mark in Pac-10 play. His final season, 2001, saw the Golden Bears finish 1–10, then the worst season in school history (the Bears went 1–11 in 2013). Holmoe went 0–5 against rival Stanford and failed to reach a bowl game. Holmoe resigned at the end of the 2001 season.

Shortly afterward, the Bears were found guilty of major NCAA violations when it emerged that a professor retroactively added two football players to a class he had taught the previous spring in order to keep them eligible. Athletic department officials knew that the players were ineligible, but did not disclose it to anyone. As a result, the NCAA slapped Cal with five years' probation, stripped the Bears of their four victories from the 1999 season, banned them from postseason play in 2002, and took away nine scholarships over four years. When Jeff Tedford led the Bears to a 7–5 record in 2002, they were not allowed to play in a bowl game.

== Athletic administration ==
After resigning from Cal, Holmoe returned to BYU to serve as associate AD. In March 2005, he was appointed as BYU's 12th AD, and the first to oversee both men's and women's athletics (previously women's sports at BYU had its own AD). Under Holmoe's leadership, the Cougars achieved success, winning 14 conference championships in the 2006–07 academic year alone and many others in subsequent years.

Holmoe had successes with head coaching hires, including for football and men's basketball. He hired head football coach Bronco Mendenhall, who returned BYU's football team to national prominence, and head men's basketball coach Dave Rose, who led BYU's men's basketball team to consistent conference championships and NCAA tournament appearances. Following Mendenhall's departure to the University of Virginia and Rose's retirement, Holmoe hired Kalani Sitake as head football coach and Mark Pope as men's head basketball coach, both of whom have led their teams to Top 25 national rankings in the end-of-season AP polls. In 2024, after Mark Pope’s departure to the University of Kentucky, Holmoe hired former NBA assistant Kevin Young as men’s basketball head coach. In his first season, Young led the men’s basketball team to the NCAA Sweet 16.

During the COVID-19 pandemic, BYU's independent football schedule was drastically altered at the last minute as several conferences decided to play league-only games. Holmoe had to quickly piece together a full season of games. He was able to fill BYU's schedule and the team finished the year 11-1 and ranked #11 in the end-of-season AP Poll. His efforts were recognized by The National Association of Collegiate Directors of Athletics (NACDA) who awarded him with the 2020-2021 Athletics Director of the Year award.

On September 10, 2021, BYU accepted an invitation to join the Big 12 Conference for all sports. Holmoe was instrumental in positioning the Cougars for the invitation, having petitioned the Big 12 for membership in 2016 and again in 2021.

In February 2025, Holmoe announced he would retire from serving as AD at the conclusion of the 2024-2025 sports season, capping two decades in the role.

== Personal life ==
Holmoe is a member of the Church of Jesus Christ of Latter-day Saints (LDS Church), converting from Lutheranism six years after leaving BYU. He lives in Provo, Utah, with his wife Lori and their four children.

Beginning July 1, 2026, he and his wife will serve as LDS Church mission leaders in the California Oakland/San Francisco Mission.

== Head coaching record ==
Year	Team	Overall	Conference	Standing	Bowl/playoffs
California Golden Bears (Pacific-10 Conference) (1997–2001)
1997	California	3–8	1–7	9th	
1998	California	5–6	3–5	7th	
1999	California	0–7*	0–5*	T–6th	
2000	California	3–8	2–6	T–8th	
2001	California	1–10	0–8	10th	
California:		12–39	6-31		
Total:		12–39			

*Cal finished 4–7 (3–5 in conference), but later vacated the wins due to use of ineligible players
