= Steve Sweeney (American football) =

American football player (born 1950)

No. 89
- Position: Wide receiver

Personal information
- Born: September 6, 1950 (age 76); Bozeman, Montana, U.S.
- Listed height: 6 ft 3 in (1.91 m)
- Listed weight: 205 lb (93 kg)

Career information
- High school: A.C. Davis
- College: California
- NFL draft: 1973: 9th round, 231st overall pick

Career history
- Oakland Raiders (1973)

Awards and highlights
- Third-team All-American (1972); 2× First-team All-Pac-8 (1971, 1972)

Career NFL statistics
- Receptions: 2
- Receiving yards: 52
- Receiving TDs: 1
- Stats at Pro Football Reference

Steven Hollis Sweeney (born September 6, 1950) is an American former professional football player who was a wide receiver for the Oakland Raiders of the National Football League (NFL). He played college football for the California Golden Bears.
