= Chad Hansen =

American football player (born 1995)

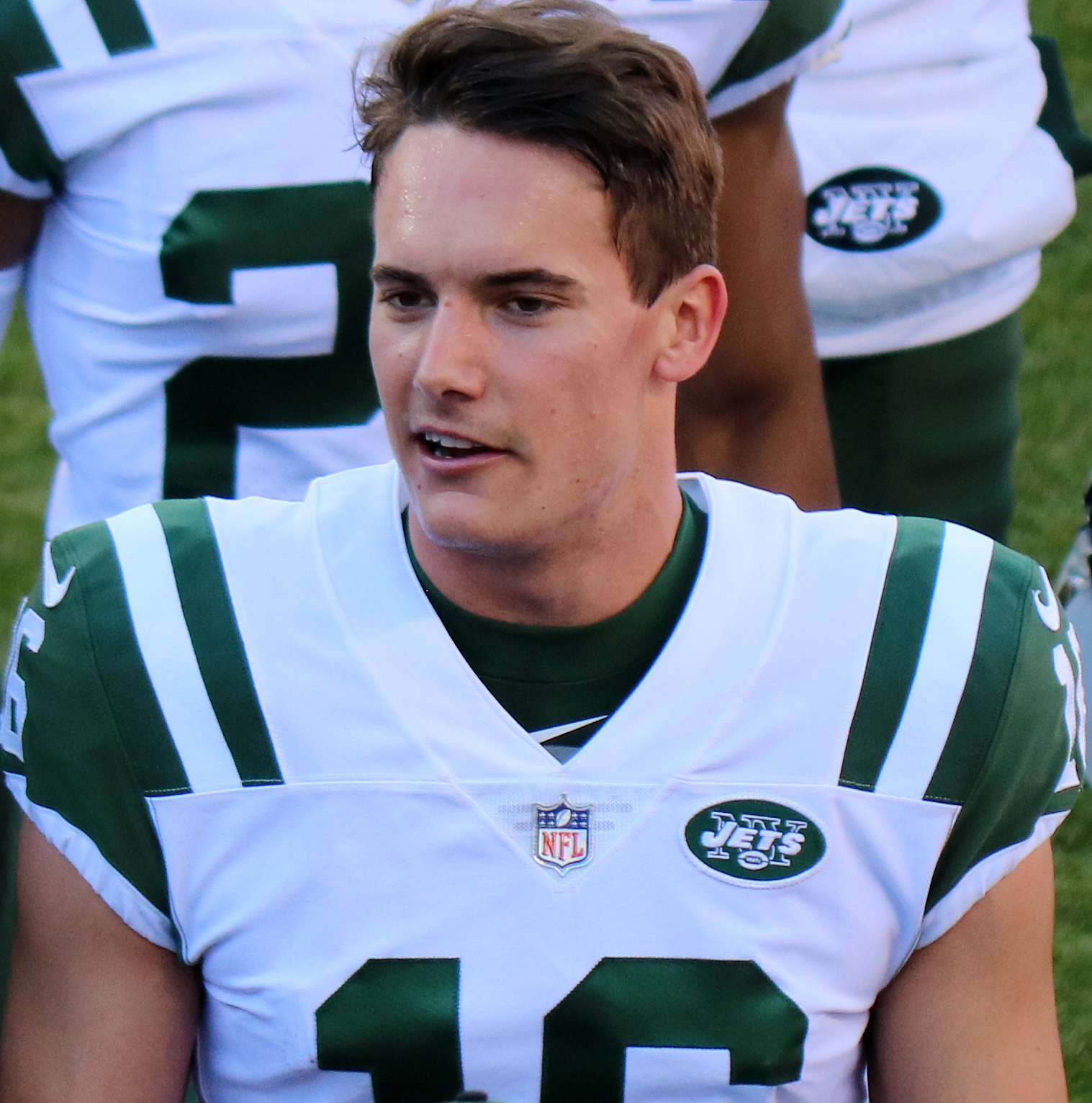
- Hansen with the New York Jets in 2017

No. 16, 17
- Position: Wide receiver

Personal information
- Born: January 18, 1995 (age 31); Fillmore, California, U.S.
- Listed height: 6 ft 2 in (1.88 m)
- Listed weight: 202 lb (92 kg)

Career information
- High school: Moorpark (Moorpark, California)
- College: California; Idaho State
- NFL draft: 2017: 4th round, 141st overall pick

Career history
- New York Jets (2017); New England Patriots (2018); Tennessee Titans (2018)*; Denver Broncos (2018–2019)*; New Orleans Saints (2019)*; Houston Texans (2019–2020); Detroit Lions (2021)*; Atlanta Falcons (2021–2022)*; DC Defenders (2023); St. Louis BattleHawks (2023)
- * Offseason or practice squad member only

Awards and highlights
- Second-team All-Pac-12 (2016)

Career NFL statistics
- Receptions: 26
- Receiving yards: 330
- Receiving touchdowns: 1
- Stats at Pro Football Reference

Timothy Chad Hansen (born January 18, 1995) is an American former professional football player who was a wide receiver in the National Football League (NFL). He played college football for the California Golden Bears and was selected by the New York Jets in the fourth round of the 2017 NFL draft.

== Early life ==
Hansen attended Moorpark High School in Moorpark, California. While there, he played high school football. As a senior, he had 49 receptions for 882 yards and 12 touchdowns.

== College career ==
Hansen's lone scholarship offer to play college football was from Idaho State University. As a true freshman at Idaho State in 2013, he played in 11 games and had 45 receptions for 501 yards and three touchdowns. After the season, he transferred to the University of California, Berkeley, to join their team as a walk-on. After sitting out 2014, due to transfer rules, Hansen had 19 receptions for 249 yards and a touchdown over 10 games for the Golden Bears in 2015. As a junior in 2016, he was named first-team All-Pac-12 Conference after recording 92 receptions for 1,249 yards and 11 touchdowns in 10 games. After the season, he decided to forgo his senior year and enter the 2017 NFL draft.

== Professional career ==
Pre-draft measurables
Height	Weight	Arm length	Hand span	40-yard dash	20-yard shuttle	Three-cone drill	Vertical jump	Broad jump	Bench press
6 ft 1 7/8 in (1.88 m)	202 lb (92 kg)	32 1/8 in (0.82 m)	10 1/8 in (0.26 m)	4.53 s	4.13 s	6.74 s	35.0 in (0.89 m)	9 ft 11 in (3.02 m)	11 reps
All values from NFL Combine

=== New York Jets ===
Hansen was selected by the New York Jets in the fourth round with the 141st overall pick in the 2017 NFL draft.

He appeared in 15 games in his rookie season, recording 9 catches for 94 yards.

On September 1, 2018, Hansen was waived by the Jets.

=== New England Patriots ===
On September 2, 2018, Hansen was claimed off waivers by the New England Patriots. He was waived on September 10, 2018.

=== Tennessee Titans ===
On October 2, 2018, Hansen was signed to the practice squad of the Tennessee Titans. He was released on October 15, 2018.

=== Denver Broncos ===
On November 13, 2018, Hansen was signed to the Denver Broncos practice squad. On January 2, 2019, Hansen was re-signed to reserve/future contract. On May 2, 2019, the Broncos waived Hansen.

=== New Orleans Saints ===
On June 11, 2019, Hansen was signed by the New Orleans Saints. He was waived on July 25, 2019.

=== Houston Texans ===
On July 26, 2019, Hansen was claimed off waivers by the Houston Texans. The Texans waived him on August 31 during final roster cuts. On September 25, 2019, Hansen was signed to the practice squad. He signed a reserve/future contract with the Texans on January 13, 2020.

On September 5, 2020, Hansen was waived by the Texans and signed to the practice squad the next day. He was elevated to the active roster on December 5 and 12 for the team's weeks 13 and 14 games against the Indianapolis Colts and Chicago Bears, and reverted to the practice squad after each game. He had five catches for 101 yards against the Colts. He was promoted to the active roster on December 19, 2020. He was released on March 23, 2021.

=== Detroit Lions ===
On June 18, 2021, Hansen signed with the Detroit Lions. He was waived on August 17, 2021.

=== Atlanta Falcons ===
On December 21, 2021, Hansen was signed to the Atlanta Falcons practice squad. He signed a reserve/future contract with the Falcons on January 10, 2022. He was waived on May 16, 2022.

=== DC Defenders ===
On January 25, 2023, Hansen was signed by the DC Defenders of the XFL. He was released on February 22, 2023.

=== St. Louis BattleHawks ===
Hansen signed with the St. Louis BattleHawks of the XFL on March 8, 2023. He was released on April 18, 2023, after making one appearance with the team.

== Personal life ==
Hansen grew up in Fillmore, California, and attended Moorpark High School. His parents are Sheri and Tim Hansen and he has two younger sisters, Erika and Jules. He is married to Bryce Watts, whom he met while attending college at UC Berkeley.
