= Bryson Albright =

American football player (born 1994)

No. 49, 54
- Position: Linebacker

Personal information
- Born: March 15, 1994 (age 32); Cincinnati, Ohio, U.S.
- Died: October 27, 2019
- Listed height: 6 ft 5 in (1.96 m)
- Listed weight: 225 lb (102 kg)

Career information
- High school: St. Xavier (Cincinnati, Ohio)
- College: Miami (OH) (2012–2015)
- NFL draft: 2016: undrafted

Career history
- Buffalo Bills (2016); Cincinnati Bengals (2017)*; Arizona Cardinals (2017)
- * Offseason or practice squad member only

Awards and highlights
- Second-team All-MAC (2015)
- Stats at Pro Football Reference

Bryson Albright (born March 15, 1994) is an American former professional football player. He played college football as a linebacker at Miami (OH). He was signed by the Buffalo Bills as an undrafted free agent after the 2016 NFL draft.

== Early life and education ==
Albright attended St. Xavier High School in Cincinnati, Ohio. As a senior, he recorded 70 tackles and 11 sacks. He was then invited to play in Ohio's 2012 North-South All-Star game. ScoutingOhio.com ranked him in their top 150 recruits.

== College career ==
Albright then attended Miami University, where he majored in kinesiology.

As a true freshman in 2012, he appeared in all 12 games. He recorded 19 tackles, one sack and 1.5 tackles-for-loss. In 2013, as a sophomore, he started all 12 games. He recorded 55 tackles (24 solo.), five sacks, 11.5 tackles-for-loss and one pass deflected. As a junior in 2014, he started all 12 games. He recorded 55 tackles, six sacks, eight tackles-for-loss, one forced fumble, one fumble recovery and one pass deflected. For the season, he was named Miami's Defensive Lineman of the Year. In 2015, he appeared in all 12 games (11 starts). He recorded 51 tackles (30 solo.), seven sacks and one interception.

=== Career statistics ===
Season				Defense					Fumbles	
Year	Team	GP	GS	Tack.	Solo.	Ass.	Sacks	TFL	FF	FR
2012	Miami (OH)	12	0	19	11	8	1	1.5	0	0
2013	Miami (OH)	12	12	55	24	31	5	11.5	0	0
2014	Miami (OH)	12	12	55	33	22	6	8	1	1
2015	Miami (OH)	12	11	51	30	21	7	12.5	1	3
Career		48	35	180	98	82	19.5	33.5	2	4

== Professional career ==
Pre-draft measurables
Height	Weight	40-yard dash	10-yard split	20-yard split	20-yard shuttle	Three-cone drill	Vertical jump	Broad jump	Bench press
6 ft 5 in (1.96 m)	239 lb (108 kg)	4.89 s	1.66 s	2.76 s	4.25 s	6.87 s	33 in (0.84 m)	10 ft 01 in (3.07 m)	18 reps
All values from Miami (OH) pro day.

=== Buffalo Bills ===
After going undrafted in the 2016 NFL draft, Albright was signed by the Buffalo Bills on May 2, 2016. After initially making the Bills 53-man, regular season roster, he was cut on September 15 and re-signed to the Bills' practice squad two days later. On December 10, he was promoted to the Bills' active roster for their game against the Pittsburgh Steelers. He was waived on December 13, 2016, and re-signed back to the practice squad.

=== Cincinnati Bengals ===
On January 24, 2017, Albright signed a reserve/future contract with the Bengals. He was waived on September 2, 2017.

=== Arizona Cardinals ===
On September 4, 2017, Albright was signed to the Arizona Cardinals' practice squad. He was promoted to the active roster on October 30, 2017.

On August 2, 2018, Albright was waived/injured by the Cardinals and placed on injured reserve. He was released five days later with an injury settlement.

== Personal life ==
Albright is the son of Dan and Denise Albright. His brother Alex Albright is a former linebacker for Boston College and the Dallas Cowboys of the National Football League (NFL).
