= Kenny Lawler =

American gridiron football player (born 1994)

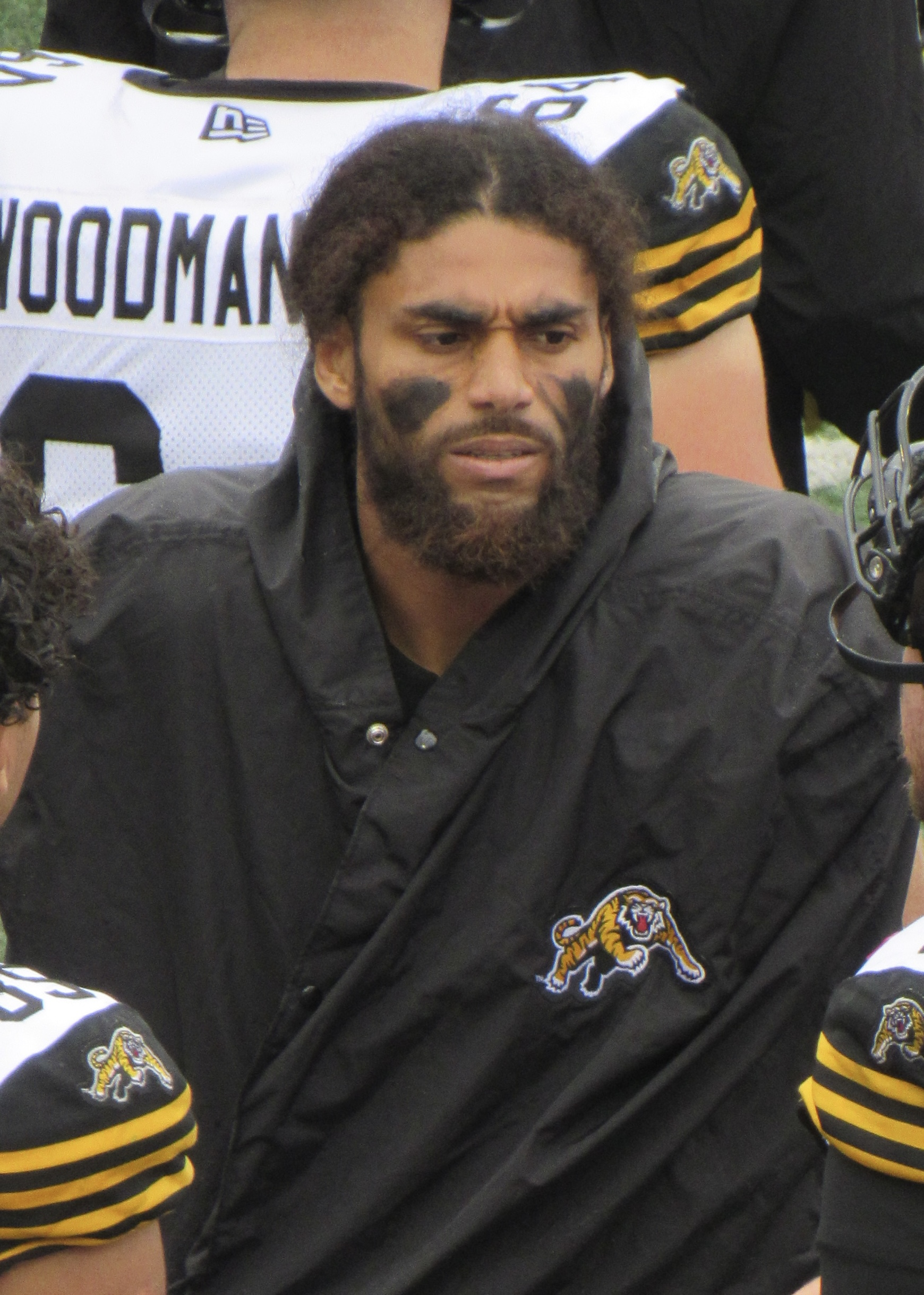
- Lawler with the Hamilton Tiger-Cats in 2025

No. 89 – Hamilton Tiger-Cats
- Position: Wide receiver
- Roster status: Active
- CFL status: American

Personal information
- Born: June 25, 1994 (age 32); Pomona, California, U.S.
- Listed height: 6 ft 2 in (1.88 m)
- Listed weight: 180 lb (82 kg)

Career information
- High school: Upland (Upland, California)
- College: California
- NFL draft: 2016: 7th round, 243rd overall pick

Career history
- 2016–2017: Seattle Seahawks*
- 2018: BC Lions*
- 2018–2021: Winnipeg Blue Bombers
- 2022: Edmonton Elks
- 2023–2024: Winnipeg Blue Bombers
- 2025–present: Hamilton Tiger-Cats
- * Offseason or practice squad member only

Awards and highlights
- 2× Grey Cup champion (2019, 2021); 2× CFL All-Star (2021, 2025); 2× CFL West All-Star (2021, 2022); CFL East All-Star (2025); First-team All-Pac-12 (2015)

Career CFL statistics as of 2026
- Receptions: 406
- Receiving yards: 6,475
- Receiving average: 15.9
- Receiving touchdowns: 47
- Stats at Pro Football Reference
- Stats at CFL.ca

Kenneth James Lawler, Jr. (born June 25, 1994) is an American professional football wide receiver for the Hamilton Tiger-Cats of the Canadian Football League (CFL). He was selected by the Seattle Seahawks in the seventh round of the 2016 NFL draft after playing college football at California.

== Early life ==
Lawler attended Upland High School in Upland, California. He had 53 receptions for 1,267 yards and 12 touchdowns as a senior and 42 receptions for 887 yards and nine touchdowns as a junior. Lawler was rated by Rivals.com as four-star recruit and committed to the University of California, Berkeley to play college football.

== College career ==
Lawler redshirted his first year at California in 2012 after he was ineligible the first six weeks while NCAA looked into some independent-study classes he had taken. He considered transferring in the offseason due to the firing of head coach Jeff Tedford, but chose to stay at California after meeting with the newly hired head coach Sonny Dykes.

In 2013, he played in 11 games with five starts and had 37 receptions for 347 yards and five touchdowns. As a sophomore, he again played in 11 games with five starts and led the team with 54 receptions for 701 yards and nine touchdowns. As a junior, Lawler had 52 receptions for 658 yards and 13 touchdowns over 13 games. After his junior season, Lawler entered the 2016 NFL draft.

== Professional career ==
=== Pre-draft ===
Prior to the 2016 NFL draft, Lawler had been projected by NFL scouts and analysts to be a middle-round pick. Lawler slid in part due to his leaner frame and his slower 40-yard dash time.

Pre-draft measurables
Height	Weight	Arm length	Hand span	Wingspan	40-yard dash	10-yard split	20-yard split	20-yard shuttle	Three-cone drill	Vertical jump	Broad jump
6 ft 2 1/2 in (1.89 m)	203 lb (92 kg)	33 3/8 in (0.85 m)	10 1/2 in (0.27 m)	6 ft 7 3/8 in (2.02 m)	4.64 s	1.56 s	2.71 s	4.18 s	7.03 s	34.5 in (0.88 m)	9 ft 6 in (2.90 m)
All values from NFL Combine/Pro Day

=== Seattle Seahawks ===
On April 30, 2016, the Seattle Seahawks selected Lawler with a seventh round pick, 243rd overall in the 2016 NFL draft. On May 6, the Seahawks announced that they had signed Lawler to his rookie contract. On September 3, he was released by the Seahawks as a part of final roster cuts; he was subsequently re-signed to the team's practice squad.

Lawler signed a reserve/future contract with the Seahawks on January 16, 2017. On September 2 Lawler was waived by the Seahawks and was later re-signed to their practice squad. Lawler was released by the team on September 13.

=== BC Lions ===
The BC Lions of the Canadian Football League (CFL) announced on May 9, 2018, they had signed Lawler to a contract, along with four other wide receivers.

=== Winnipeg Blue Bombers (first stint) ===
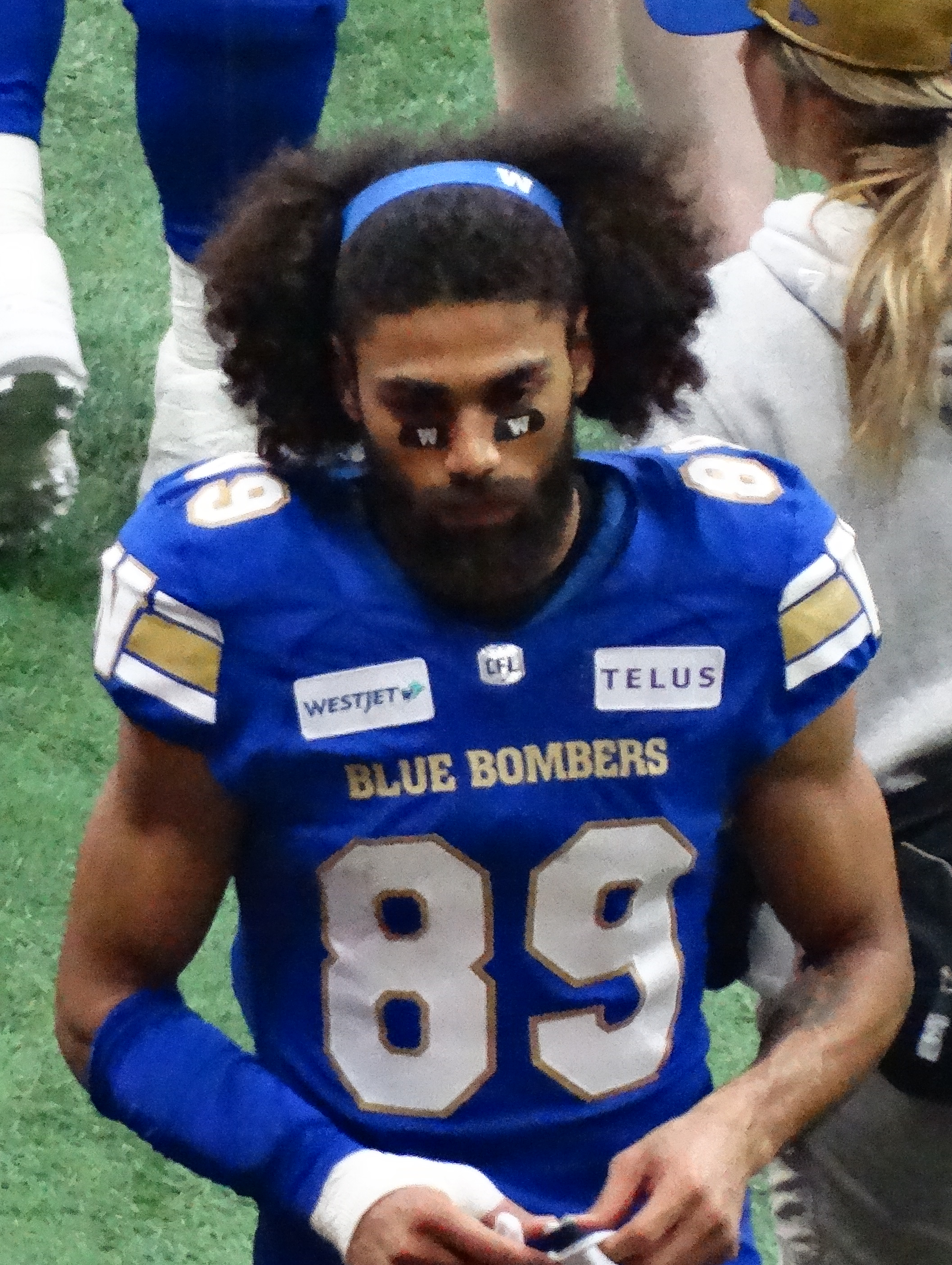
Lawler with the Blue Bombers in 2024

The Winnipeg Blue Bombers of the CFL signed Lawler to their practice roster on October 22, 2018. Lawler became a regular contributor for the Blue Bombers during the 2019 season, with his breakout game coming in a loss against Hamilton, where he caught 10 passes for 144 yards. As the leading receiver on the team in yards, Lawler helped the Bombers to their first Grey Cup win in 29 years, when they won the 107th Grey Cup at the end of the 2019 season.

After the CFL canceled the 2020 season due to the COVID-19 pandemic, Lawler chose to opt-out of his contract with the Blue Bombers on August 27, 2020. He signed a one-year contract extension with Winnipeg on February 3, 2021. Midway through the 2021 season, on October 4, 2021, it was revealed that Lawler had been arrested for impaired driving and was suspended for the team's Week 10 match. Despite the struggles in his personal life, Lawler went on to lead the CFL in receiving with 1,014 yards and six touchdowns. As a result, Lawler was named both a CFL West All-Star and CFL All-Star for the first time. The Bombers finished the year with the best regular season record. Winnipeg defeated Saskatchewan to go to 108th Grey Cup, their second consecutive championship game. They won in overtime to win their second Grey Cup in a row. Lawler added 90 yards receiving in the postseason to help the Blue Bombers to their second title.

=== Edmonton Elks ===
Lawler signed with the Edmonton Elks of the CFL to a one-year contract to open free agency on February 8, 2022, and became the highest paid receiver in the CFL. In late August 2022 Lawler suffered an ankle injury. At the time of the injury he was tied for second place in both receptions (56) and receiving yards (849). He returned to action on October 1 against the Montreal Alouettes. However, a couple days later it was reported that Lawler had suffered a shoulder/collarbone injury and underwent season ending surgery. He finished the season with 58 receptions for 894 yards and five touchdowns. He became a free agent upon the expiry of his contract on February 14, 2023.

=== Winnipeg Blue Bombers (second stint) ===
On the first day of free agency, on February 14, 2023, it was announced that Lawler had signed a two-year contract with the Blue Bombers. Lawler was transferred to the team's suspended list in advance of the 2023 season as he was facing passport challenges related to his impaired driving charge in October 2021. Lawler returned to the Bombers starting lineup in Week 7, having missed the first six games of the season. He played in 12 regular season games where he had 50 catches for 901 yards and six touchdowns.

In 2024, Lawler was injured in the first game of the season after recording three receptions for 26 yards in the Grey Cup rematch against the Montreal Alouettes. He returned in week 11 and played in the rest of the regular season, totalling 10 games with 41 catches for 662 yards and four touchdowns. Lawler started in both post-season games, including the 111th Grey Cup where he had two receptions for 27 yards in the Blue Bombers' 41–24 loss to the Toronto Argonauts. Unable to come to terms on a new contract, Lawler became a free agent on February 11, 2025.

=== Hamilton Tiger-Cats ===
On February 12, 2025, it was announced that Lawler had signed with the Hamilton Tiger-Cats to a two-year contract.

On May 26, 2026, Lawler and the Tiger-Cats agreed to a three–year, $1 million contract extension.

== CFL career statistics ==
Legend
*	Led the league
≈	Won the Grey Cup
±	Grey Cup MVP
**Bold**	Career high

Receiving		Regular season						Postseason
Year	Team	Games	Rec	Yards	Avg	Long	TD	Games	Rec	Yards	Avg	Long	TD
2019	WPG	16	43	637	14.8	54	4	**3**	8	126	15.6	30	1
2020	WPG	Season cancelled						Season cancelled
2021	WPG	13	64	1,014	15.8	47	6	2	6	90	15.0	26	0
2022	EDM	12	58	894	15.4	54	5	Team did not qualify
2023	WPG	12	50	901	**18.0**	64	6	2	**9**	150	16.7	42	0
2024	WPG	10	41	662	16.1	72	4	2	6	**204**	**34.0**	**65**	**3**
2025	HAM	**18**	**86**	**1,443**	16.8	**79**	**14**	1	9	117	13.0	22	0
2026	HAM	13	44	617	14.0	49	6	0	0	0	0.0	0	0
CFL totals		94	387	6,174	15.8	79	45	10	38	687	18.1	65	4

== Personal life ==
Lawler Jr. recently had a son, Kenneth James Lawler II. Lawler's siblings; Perri, Sydney and Kenzel. Younger brother was a Junior at Roosevelt High School, QB on Varsity. Lawler's mother, Patricia Hicks works in the medical field. His father is Kenneth Lawler Sr. and he played college football as a cornerback at Oregon, he would later become a coach at Mt. Sac Junior College, then at Boise State and currently at San Bernardino Valley College. With his wife, Mary, they have six children combined.
