= Bryce Treggs =

American football player (born 1994)

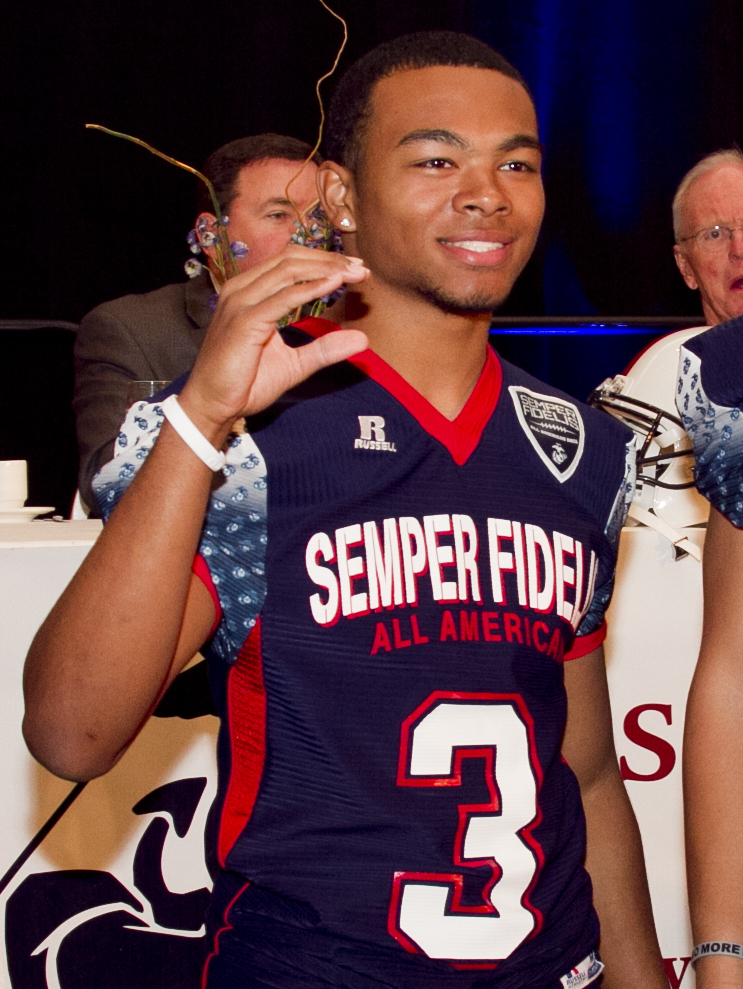
- Treggs in 2012

No. 11, 16
- Position: Wide receiver

Personal information
- Born: April 30, 1994 (age 32); Bellflower, California, U.S.
- Listed height: 6 ft 0 in (1.83 m)
- Listed weight: 185 lb (84 kg)

Career information
- High school: St. John Bosco (Bellflower)
- College: California
- NFL draft: 2016: undrafted

Career history
- San Francisco 49ers (2016)*; Philadelphia Eagles (2016–2017); Cleveland Browns (2017); Philadelphia Eagles (2017–2018)*
- * Offseason or practice squad member only

Awards and highlights
- Super Bowl champion (LII)

Career NFL statistics
- Receptions: 8
- Receiving yards: 159
- Stats at Pro Football Reference

Bryce Treggs (born April 30, 1994) is an American former professional football player who was a wide receiver in the National Football League (NFL). He played college football for the California Golden Bears, and was signed by the San Francisco 49ers as an undrafted free agent after the 2016 NFL draft.

== Professional career ==
Pre-draft measurables
Height	Weight	Arm length	Hand span	40-yard dash	10-yard split	20-yard split	20-yard shuttle	Three-cone drill	Vertical jump	Broad jump
5 ft 11 3/8 in (1.81 m)	190 lb (86 kg)	30 7/8 in (0.78 m)	9 1/8 in (0.23 m)	4.39 s	1.53 s	2.58 s	4.19 s	7.00 s	34.0 in (0.86 m)	10 ft 2 in (3.10 m)
All values from Pro Day

=== San Francisco 49ers ===
Treggs signed with the San Francisco 49ers as an undrafted free agent on May 6, 2016. He was waived on September 3, 2016.

=== Philadelphia Eagles ===
Treggs was claimed off waivers by the Philadelphia Eagles on September 4, 2016.

On September 2, 2017, Treggs was waived by the Eagles and was signed to the practice squad the next day.

=== Cleveland Browns ===
On October 4, 2017, Treggs was signed by the Cleveland Browns off the Eagles' practice squad. He was waived on December 13, 2017.

=== Philadelphia Eagles (second stint) ===
On December 14, 2017, Treggs was signed to the Eagles' practice squad. While Treggs was on their practice squad, the Eagles defeated the New England Patriots in Super Bowl LII. He signed a reserve/future contract with the Eagles on February 7, 2018.

On September 1, 2018, Treggs was waived by the Eagles.

== Personal life ==
His father, Brian Treggs, also played college football at Cal and in the NFL.
