= 1997 Washington State Cougars football team =

American college football season

1997 Washington State Cougars football
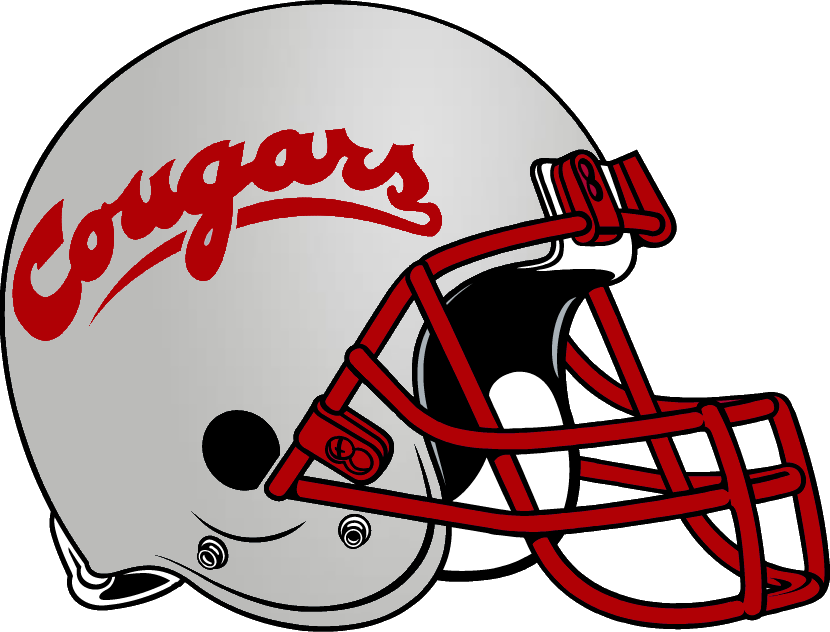

Pac-10 co-champion

Rose Bowl, L 16–21 vs. Michigan
- Conference: Pacific-10 Conference

Ranking
- Coaches: No. 9
- AP: No. 9
- Record: 10–2 (7–1 Pac-10)
- Head coach: Mike Price (9th season)
- Offensive coordinator: Jim McDonell (4th season)
- Offensive scheme: Spread
- Defensive coordinator: Bill Doba (4th season)
- Base defense: 4–3
- Home stadium: Martin Stadium

1997 Pacific-10 Conference football standings
	Conf.			Overall
Team	W		L	W		L
No. 9 Washington State +	7	–	1	10	–	2
No. 5 UCLA +	7	–	1	10	–	2
No. 14 Arizona State	6	–	2	9	–	3
No. 18 Washington	5	–	3	8	–	4
Arizona	4	–	4	7	–	5
USC	4	–	4	6	–	5
Oregon	3	–	5	7	–	5
Stanford	3	–	5	5	–	6
California	1	–	7	3	–	8
Oregon State	0	–	8	3	–	8
+ – Conference co-champions; Rankings from AP Poll

The 1997 Washington State Cougars football team was an American football team that represented Washington State University in the Pacific-10 Conference (Pac-10) during the 1997 NCAA Division I-A football season. In their ninth season under head coach Mike Price, the Cougars went 10–1 in the regular season (7–1 in Pac-10), won the conference championship, lost to #1 Michigan in the Rose Bowl, and outscored their opponents 483 to 296. They played their home games on campus at Martin Stadium in Pullman, Washington, and were ninth in the final rankings.

The team's statistical leaders included Ryan Leaf with 3,968 passing yards, Michael Black with 1,181 rushing yards, and Chris Jackson with 1,005 receiving yards. Freshman defensive back Lamont Thompson led the team with 6 interceptions.

The Rose Bowl appearance was the first for Washington State in 67 years; the next was five years later.

Leaf decided to forgo his remaining season of eligibility (1998) and entered the 1998 NFL draft, where he was the second overall selection.

== Schedule ==
Date	Time	Opponent	Rank	Site	TV	Result	Attendance
August 30	12:30 pm	UCLA		Martin Stadium; Pullman, WA	ABC	W 37–34	26,000
September 13	3:30 pm	at No. 23 USC		Memorial Coliseum; Los Angeles, CA	FSN	W 28–21	51,655
September 20	9:30 am	at Illinois*	No. 19	Memorial Stadium; Champaign, IL	ESPN2	W 35–22	47,131
September 27	2:00 pm	Boise State*	No. 15	Martin Stadium; Pullman, WA		W 58–0	34,131
October 4	1:00 pm	at Oregon	No. 15	Autzen Stadium; Eugene, OR		W 24–13	43,516
October 18	2:00 pm	California^{†}	No. 13	Martin Stadium; Pullman, WA		W 63–37	35,739
October 25	12:30 pm	Arizona	No. 10	Martin Stadium; Pullman, WA	ABC	W 35–34 ^{OT}	31,137
November 1	7:00 pm	at No. 20 Arizona State	No. 10	Sun Devil Stadium; Tempe, AZ	FSN	L 31–44	73,644
November 8	2:00 pm	Southwestern Louisiana*	No. 16	Martin Stadium; Pullman, WA		W 77–7	32,345
November 15	2:00 pm	Stanford	No. 14	Martin Stadium; Pullman, WA		W 38–28	40,306
November 22	12:30 pm	at No. 20 Washington	No. 11	Husky Stadium; Seattle, WA (Apple Cup)	ABC	W 41–35	74,268
January 1, 1998	2:00 pm	vs. No. 1 Michigan*	No. 8	Rose Bowl; Pasadena, CA (Rose Bowl)	ABC	L 16–21	101,219
*Non-conference game; ^{†}Homecoming; Rankings from AP Poll released prior to the game; All times are in Pacific time

== Rankings ==
Ranking movements Legend: ██ Increase in ranking ██ Decrease in ranking — = Not ranked
	Week																	
Poll	Pre	1	2	3	4	5	6	7	8	9	10	11	12	13	14	15	16	Final
AP	—	—	—	—	19	15	15	12	13	10	10	16	14	11	10	8	8	9
Coaches	—	—	—	—	20	14	15	12	13	10	10	15	13	11	10	7	7	9

== Game summaries ==
=== UCLA ===
UCLA at Washington State

Team	1	2	3	4	Total
Bruins (0–0)	7	7	13	7	34
• Cougars (0–0)	3	27	7	0	37

- Date: August 30, 1997
- Location: Martin Stadium
  Pullman, WA
- Game attendance: 26,000
- TV announcers (ABC): Keith Jackson (play-by-play), Bob Griese (analyst), and Lynn Swann (sideline)

Scoring summary
1		UCLA	Skip Hicks 2-yard run (Chris Sailer kick)	UCLA 7–0
1		WSU	Rian Lindell ?-yard field goal	UCLA 7–3
2	14:43	UCLA	Skip Hicks 9-yard run (Chris Sailer kick)	UCLA 14–3
2	11:07	WSU	Michael Black 17-yard run (Rian Lindell kick)	UCLA 14–10
2	8:13	WSU	Nian Talor 57-yard pass from Ryan Leaf (Rian Lindell kick failed)	WSU 16–14
2	4:35	WSU	Ryan Leaf 1-yard run (Rian Lindell kick)	WSU 23–14
2	0:54	WSU	Nian Talor 29-yard pass from Ryan Leaf (Rian Lindell kick failed)	WSU 30–14
3	12:50	UCLA	Skip Hicks 2-yard run (kick failed)	WSU 30–21
3	11:51	WSU	Chris Jackson 78-yard pass from Ryan Leaf (Rian Lindell kick)	WSU 37–21
3	2:22	UCLA	Danny Farmer 6-yard pass from Cade McNown (pass failed)	WSU 37–27
4	14:13	UCLA	Skip Hicks 4-yard run (Chris Sailer kick)	WSU 37–34

UCLA took a 14-3 lead early in the second quarter, but Washington State exploded for 27 unanswered points to end the half. The Cougars led by as many as 16 on two occasions, but clung to just a 3-point lead late in the game. UCLA had a 4th and goal from the one-yard line with 2:50 remaining, but the Cougars stood tall to emerge victorious.

=== At No. 23 USC ===
Washington State at USC

Team	1	2	3	4	Total
• Cougars (1–0)	7	14	0	7	28
No. 23 Trojans (1–0)	0	6	7	8	21

- Date: September 13, 1997
- Location: Los Angeles Memorial Coliseum
  Los Angeles, CA
- Game start: 3:38 pm
- Elapsed time: 3:29
- Game attendance: 51,655
- Referee: Pat Flood
- Television network: FSN

Scoring summary
1	4:14	WSU	McWashington 3-yard pass from Ryan Leaf (Rian Lindell kick)	WSU 7–0
2	13:27	WSU	Michael Black 16-yard run (Rian Lindell kick)	WSU 14–0
2	7:12	USC	M. MacKenzie 1-yard run (Adam Abrams kick blocked)	WSU 14–6
2	0:50	WSU	Love Jefferson 6-yard pass from Ryan Leaf (Rian Lindell kick)	WSU 21–6
3	14:44	USC	R. Jay Soward 95-yard kickoff return (Adam Abrams kick)	WSU 21–13
4	12:44	USC	M. Bastianelli 15-yard pass from LaVale Woods (Billy Miller pass)	Tied 21–21
4	4:18	WSU	Keven McKenzie 51-yard pass from Ryan Leaf (Rian Lindell kick)	WSU 28–21

Washington State defeated No. 23 USC in Los Angeles for the first time since 1957.

=== At Illinois ===
Washington State at Illinois

Team	1	2	3	4	Total
• No. 19 Cougars (2–0)	7	0	7	21	35
Fighting Illini (0–2)	0	7	7	8	22

- Date: September 20, 1997
- Location: Memorial Stadium
  Champaign, IL
- Game start: 9:30 am PDT
- Game attendance: 47,131
- Television network: ESPN2

=== Boise State ===
Boise State at Washington State

Team	1	2	3	4	Total
Broncos (2–2)	0	0	0	0	0
• No. 15 Cougars (3–0)	14	17	17	10	58

- Date: September 27, 1997
- Location: Martin Stadium
  Pullman, WA
- Game attendance: 34,131

=== At Oregon ===
Washington State at Oregon

Team	1	2	3	4	Total
• No. 15 Cougars (4–0)	7	7	7	3	24
Ducks (3–1)	0	3	0	10	13

- Date: October 4, 1997
- Location: Autzen Stadium
  Eugene, OR
- Game start: 1:00 pm PDT
- Game attendance: 43,516

=== At No. 20 Arizona State ===
Washington State at Arizona State

Team	1	2	3	4	Total
No. 10 Cougars (7–0)	0	7	10	14	31
• No. 20 Sun Devils (5–2)	7	17	0	20	44

- Date: November 1, 1997
- Location: Sun Devil Stadium
  Tempe, AZ
- Game start: 8:00 pm PDT
- Game attendance: 73,644
- Television network: FSN

Scoring summary
1		ASU	Lenzie Jackson 13-yard pass from Ryan Kealy (Nycz kick)	ASU 7–0
2		ASU	Kenny Mitchell 8-yard pass from Ryan Kealy (Nycz kick)	ASU 14–0
2		ASU	Nycz FG	ASU 17–0
2	7:43	ASU	TD pass from Ryan Kealy (Nycz kick)	ASU 24–0
2		WSU	TD pass from Ryan Leaf (Rian Lindell kick)	ASU 24–7
3		ASU	Rian Lindell 43-yard field goal	ASU 24–10
3	1:17	WSU	DeJuan Gilmore 2-yard run (Rian Lindell kick)	ASU 24–17
4	13:18	WSU	Shawn McWashington 11-yard pass from Ryan Leaf (Ryan Leaf run)	WSU 25–24
4	9:57	ASU	Tariq McDonald 5-yard pass from Ryan Kealy (conversion failed)	ASU 30–25
4	2:55	ASU	Hamilton Mee 66-yard fumble return (Nycz kick)	ASU 37–25
4	2:32	ASU	Derrick Ford fumble recovery in end zone (Nycz kick)	ASU 44–25
4		WSU	TD pass from Ryan Leaf (Rian Lindell kick)	ASU 44–31

After trailing 24–0 midway through the second quarter, Washington State rallied to take a 25–24 lead early in the fourth quarter. After Arizona State answered with a touchdown, the Cougars were driving again. However, the Cougars were doomed by two late fumbles that were both returned for touchdowns.

=== Vs. No. 1 Michigan (Rose Bowl) ===
Washington State vs. Michigan
(1998 Rose Bowl)

Team	1	2	3	4	Total
No. 8 Cougars (10–1)	7	0	6	3	16
• No. 1 Wolverines (11–0)	0	7	7	7	21

- Date: Thursday, January 1, 1998
- Location: Rose Bowl
  Pasadena, CA
- Game attendance: 101,219
- Referee: Dick Burleson
- TV announcers (ABC): Keith Jackson and Bob Griese

Scoring summary
1	3:17	WSU	Kevin McKenzie 15-yard pass from Ryan Leaf (Rian Lindell kick)	WSU 7–0
2	7:08	MICH	Tai Streets 53-yard pass from Brian Griese (Jay Feely kick)	Tied 7–7
3	8:23	WSU	Shawn Tims 14-yard run (kick failed)	WSU 13–7
3	5:07	MICH	Tai Streets 58-yard pass from Brian Griese (Kraig Baker kick)	MICH 14–13
4	11:21	MICH	Jerame Tuman 23-yard pass from Brian Griese (Kraig Baker kick)	MICH 21–13
4	7:25	WSU	Rian Lindell 48-yard field goal	MICH 21–16

== Roster ==
1997 Washington State Cougars football team roster
Players
Coaches
Offense

Pos.	#	Name	Class
QB	13	Steve Birnbaum	So
RB	5	Michael Black	Sr
RB	24	Jason Clayton	Jr
RB	1	DeJuan Gilmore	Jr
C	62	Lee Harrison	Sr
RB	37	Adam Hawkins	Fr
WR	81	Chris Jackson	Sr
TE	20	Love Jefferson	Jr
QB	16	Ryan Leaf	Jr
TE	86	Brenden Marshall	Jr
C	76	Jason McEndoo	Sr
WR	9	Kevin McKenzie	Sr
OT	76	Ryan McShane	Sr
WR	45	Shawn McWashington	Sr
OT	79	Rob Rainville	Jr
WR	82	Nian Taylor	So
G	71	Cory Withrow	Sr
WR	8	Shawn Tims	Sr

Defense

Pos.	#	Name	Class
DT	91	Leon Bender	Sr
DE	90	Dorian Boose	Sr
DE	46	Shane Doyle	Sr
CB	3	LeJuan Gibbons	So
LB	34	Steve Gleason	So
DB	29	Torry Hollimon	So
DT	95	Gary Holmes	Jr
DB	28	Jermaine Hunsaker	Fr
FS	2	Ray Jackson	Sr
LB	22	Brandon Moore	Sr
CB	6	Dee Moronkola	Jr
LB	43	Todd Nelson	Jr
SS	25	Duane Stewart	Sr
DB	19	Lamont Thompson	Fr

Special teams

Pos.	#	Name	Class
P	12	Jeff Banks	Sr
K	21	Rian Lindell	So

Head coach

- Mike Price (9th year)

Coordinators/assistant coaches

- Jim McDonell – OC
- Bill Doba – DC
- Larry Lewis – AHC, ST

Legend

- (C) Team captain
- (S) Suspended
- (I) Ineligible
- Injured
- Redshirt

== Awards and honors ==
- Ryan Leaf – Sammy Baugh Trophy, Pac-10 Offensive Player of the Year, All-American, Third in Heisman Trophy voting
- Leon Bender – All-American
- Mike Price – Bobby Dodd Coach of the Year Award, Eddie Robinson Coach of the Year, Home Depot Coach of the Year Award, Sporting News College Football Coach of the Year, Pac-10 Coach of the Year

== NFL draft ==
Four Cougars were selected in the 1998 NFL draft; quarterback Ryan Leaf was taken second overall.

Player	Position	Round	Overall	Franchise
Ryan Leaf	QB	1	2	San Diego Chargers
Leon Bender	DT	2	31	Oakland Raiders
Dorian Boose	DT	2	56	New York Jets
Jason McEndoo	T	7	197	Seattle Seahawks
