= 1998 Cotton Bowl Classic =

1998 Southwestern Bell Cotton Bowl Classic
- 62nd Cotton Bowl Classic
- The Cotton Bowl in Dallas, Texas, hosted the Cotton Bowl Classic.
UCLA Bruins	Texas A&M Aggies
(9–2)	(9–3)
Pac-10	Big 12
29	23
Head coach: Bob Toledo	Head coach: R. C. Slocum
AP / Coaches / BA; 5 / 5 / 5	AP / Coaches / BA; 20 / 19 / 19
	1	2	3	4	Total
UCLA	0	7	14	8	29
Texas A&M	7	9	7	0	23
- Date: January 1, 1998
- Season: 1997
- Stadium: Cotton Bowl
- Location: Dallas, Texas, USA
- MVP: QB Cade McNown (UCLA); LB Dat Nguyen (Texas A&M)
- Referee: Tom Robinson (WAC)
- Attendance: 59,215

United States TV coverage
- Network: CBS
- Announcers: Gus Johnson and Mike Mayock

The 1998 Southwestern Bell Cotton Bowl Classic was a college football bowl game played on January 1, 1998, at the Cotton Bowl in Dallas, Texas. The Cotton Bowl Classic was part of the 1997 NCAA Division I-A football season. The bowl game featured the UCLA Bruins from the Pac-10 and the Texas A&M Aggies from the Big 12. The game was televised on CBS.

== Game summary ==
1st quarter scoring:

- Texas A&M – Brandon Jennings 64-yard interception return after 19-yard return and lateral from Dat Nguyen (Kyle Bryant kick) 4:35

2nd quarter scoring:

- Texas A&M – Zerek Rollins tackled Cade McNown in end zone for safety; 10:18
- Texas A&M – Dante Hall 74-yard run (Bryant kick) 5:54;
- UCLA – Jim McElroy 22-yard pass from McNown (Chris Sailer kick) 0:02

3rd quarter scoring:

- UCLA – Skip Hicks 41-yard pass from McNown (Sailer kick) 12:37;
- Texas A&M - Chris Cole 43 run (Bryant kick) 8:37;
- UCLA – McNown 20-yard run (Sailer kick) 2:44

4th quarter scoring:

- UCLA – Ryan Neufeld 5-yard run (McNown run) 7:05
