= 1997 UCLA Bruins football team =

American college football season

1997 UCLA Bruins football

Pac-10 co-champion Cotton Bowl Classic champion

Cotton Bowl Classic, W 29–23 vs. Texas A&M
- Conference: Pacific-10 Conference

Ranking
- Coaches: No. 5
- AP: No. 5
- Record: 10–2 (7–1 Pac-10)
- Head coach: Bob Toledo (2nd season)
- Offensive coordinator: Al Borges (2nd season)
- Offensive scheme: Pro-style
- Defensive coordinator: Rocky Long (2nd season)
- Base defense: 3–3–5
- Home stadium: Rose Bowl

1997 Pacific-10 Conference football standings
	Conf.			Overall
Team	W		L	W		L
No. 9 Washington State +	7	–	1	10	–	2
No. 5 UCLA +	7	–	1	10	–	2
No. 14 Arizona State	6	–	2	9	–	3
No. 18 Washington	5	–	3	8	–	4
Arizona	4	–	4	7	–	5
USC	4	–	4	6	–	5
Oregon	3	–	5	7	–	5
Stanford	3	–	5	5	–	6
California	1	–	7	3	–	8
Oregon State	0	–	8	3	–	8
+ – Conference co-champions; Rankings from AP Poll

The 1997 UCLA Bruins football team represented the University of California, Los Angeles (UCLA) as a member of the Pacific-10 Conference (Pac-10) during the 1997 NCAA Division I-A football season. Led by second-year head coach Bob Toledo, the Bruins compiled an overall record of 10–2 with a mark of 7–1 in conference play, sharing the Pac-10 title with Washington State. UCLA was invited to the Cotton Bowl Classic, where the Bruins defeated Texas A&M. Though the Bruins were down 16–7 at the half, Cade McNown, the offensive MVP of the game, led the team to a 29–23 victory. UCLA was ranked No. 5 in both the final AP poll and the final Coaches Poll. The team played home games at the Rose Bowl in Pasadena, California.

== Schedule ==
Date	Time	Opponent	Rank	Site	TV	Result	Attendance	Source
August 30	12:30 pm	at Washington State		Martin Stadium; Pullman, WA	ABC	L 34–37	26,000	
September 6	12:30 pm	No. 3 Tennessee*		Rose Bowl; Pasadena, CA	ABC	L 24–30	62,619	
September 13	12:30 pm	at No. 11 Texas*		Darrell K Royal–Texas Memorial Stadium; Austin, TX	ABC, FSW	W 66–3	77,203	
September 27	3:30 pm	Arizona	No. 24	Rose Bowl; Pasadena, CA	FSN	W 40–27	50,188	
October 4	3:30 pm	Houston*	No. 22	Rose Bowl; Pasadena, CA	FSW2	W 66–10	38,004	
October 11	3:30 pm	at Oregon	No. 18	Autzen Stadium; Eugene, OR	FX	W 39–31	42,314	
October 18	3:30 pm	Oregon State	No. 17	Rose Bowl; Pasadena, CA	FSN	W 34–10	38,165	
October 25	3:30 pm	California	No. 13	Rose Bowl; Pasadena, CA (rivalry)		W 35–17	52,858	
November 1	3:30 pm	at Stanford	No. 12	Stanford Stadium; Stanford, CA (rivalry)	FSN	W 27–7	54,332	
November 15	12:30 pm	No. 13 Washington	No. 9	Rose Bowl; Pasadena, CA	ABC	W 52–28	85,697	
November 22	12:30 pm	at USC	No. 7	Los Angeles Memorial Coliseum; Los Angeles, CA (Victory Bell)	ABC, FSW2	W 31–24	91,350	
January 1	10:30 am	vs. No. 20 Texas A&M*	No. 5	Cotton Bowl; Dallas, TX (Cotton Bowl Classic)	CBS	W 29–23	59,215	
*Non-conference game; Rankings from AP Poll released prior to the game; All times are in Pacific time

== Rankings ==
Ranking movements Legend: ██ Increase in ranking ██ Decrease in ranking — = Not ranked RV = Received votes
	Week																	
Poll	Pre	1	2	3	4	5	6	7	8	9	10	11	12	13	14	15	16	Final
AP	—	—	—	RV	24	24	22	18	17	13	12	10	9	7	6	5	5	5
Coaches	RV	RV	—	RV	RV	RV	25	19	18	16	13	11	10	9	7	6	6	5
Harris	Not released																	Not released
BCS	Not released																	Not released

== Game summaries ==
=== At Washington State ===
UCLA at Washington State

Team	1	2	3	4	Total
Bruins	7	7	13	7	34
• Cougars	3	27	7	0	37

- Date: August 30, 1997
- Location: Martin Stadium
  Pullman, WA
- Game attendance: 26,000
- TV announcers (ABC): Keith Jackson (play-by-play), Bob Griese (analyst), and Lynn Swann (sideline)

Scoring summary
1		UCLA	Skip Hicks 2-yard run (Chris Sailer kick)	UCLA 7–0
1		WSU	Rian Lindell ?-yard field goal	UCLA 7–3
2	14:43	UCLA	Skip Hicks 9-yard run (Chris Sailer kick)	UCLA 14–3
2	11:07	WSU	Michael Black 17-yard run (Rian Lindell kick)	UCLA 14–10
2	8:13	WSU	Nian Talor 57-yard pass from Ryan Leaf (Rian Lindell kick failed)	WSU 16–14
2	4:35	WSU	Ryan Leaf 1-yard run (Rian Lindell kick)	WSU 23–14
2	0:54	WSU	Nian Talor 29-yard pass from Ryan Leaf (Rian Lindell kick failed)	WSU 30–14
3	12:50	UCLA	Skip Hicks 2-yard run (kick failed)	WSU 30–21
3	11:51	WSU	Chris Jackson 78-yard pass from Ryan Leaf (Rian Lindell kick)	WSU 37–21
3	2:22	UCLA	Danny Farmer 6-yard pass from Cade McNown (pass failed)	WSU 37–27
4	14:13	UCLA	Skip Hicks 4-yard run (Chris Sailer kick)	WSU 37–34

=== No. 3 Tennessee ===
Tennessee at UCLA

Team	1	2	3	4	Total
• No. 3 Volunteers	9	15	3	3	30
Bruins	0	3	3	18	24

- Date: September 6
- Location: Rose Bowl, Pasadena, California
- Game start: 12:35 pm PDT
- Elapsed time: 3:41
- Game attendance: 62,619

*Source: Box score

=== At Texas ===
	1	2	3	4	Total
Bruins	10	28	21	7	66
#11 Longhorns	0	0	3	0	3

=== Arizona ===
	1	2	3	4	Total
Wildcats	7	0	20	0	27
#24 Bruins	31	6	0	3	40

=== Houston ===
	1	2	3	4	Total
Cougars	7	0	0	3	10
#22 Bruins	42	7	7	10	66

=== At Oregon ===
	1	2	3	4	Total
#18 Bruins	27	3	6	3	39
Ducks	21	7	3	0	31

=== Oregon State ===
	1	2	3	4	Total
Beavers	10	0	0	0	10
#17 Bruins	14	14	3	3	34

=== California ===
	1	2	3	4	Total
Golden Bears	14	3	0	0	17
#13 Bruins	0	14	14	7	35

=== At Stanford ===
	1	2	3	4	Total
#12 Bruins	14	7	3	3	27
Cardinal	0	0	7	0	7

=== Washington ===
	1	2	3	4	Total
#13 Huskies	17	3	8	0	28
#9 Bruins	3	14	21	14	52

=== At USC ===
	1	2	3	4	Total
#7 Bruins	10	7	7	7	31
Trojans	14	7	3	0	24

The Bruins retained the Victory Bell for the seventh straight year.

=== Vs. Texas A&M Aggies (Cotton Bowl Classic) ===
UCLA vs. Texas A&M
(Cotton Bowl Classic)

Team	1	2	3	4	Total
• No. 5 Bruins	0	7	14	8	29
No. 20 Aggies	7	9	7	0	23

- Date: January 1
- Location: Cotton Bowl
  Dallas, TX
- Game attendance: 59,215
- Game weather: 53 °F (12 °C), Cloudy
- Referee: Tom Robinson
- TV announcers (CBS): Gus Johnson and Mike Mayock

Scoring summary

Quarter	Time	Drive			Team	Scoring information	Score	
Quarter	Time	Plays	Yards	TOP	Team	Scoring information	UCLA	Texas A&M
1	4:35				Texas A&M	Interception returned 64 yards for touchdown by Brandon Jennings, Kyle Bryant kick good	0	7
2	10:18				Texas A&M	Cade McNown tackled in end zone for a safety by Zerick Rollins	0	9
2	5:54	3	90		Texas A&M	Dante Hall 74-yard touchdown run, Kyle Bryant kick good	0	16
2	0:02	5	47		UCLA	Jim McElroy 22-yard touchdown reception from Cade McNown, Chris Sailer kick good	7	16
3	12:34	3	45		UCLA	Skip Hicks 41-yard touchdown reception from Cade McNown, Chris Sailer kick good	14	16
3	8:37	8	65		Texas A&M	Chris Cole 43-yard touchdown run, Kyle Bryant kick good	14	23
3	2:44	8	65		UCLA	Cade McNown 20-yard touchdown run, Chris Sailer kick good	21	23
4	7:05	8	71		UCLA	Ryan Neufeld 5-yard touchdown run, 2-point run good	29	23
"TOP" = time of possession. For other American football terms, see Glossary of American football.							29	23

== Roster ==
1997 UCLA Bruins football team roster
Players
Coaches
Offense

Pos.	#	Name	Class
WR	87	Danny Farmer	So
OT	71	Kris Farris	Jr
RB	20	Skip Hicks	Sr
QB	18	Cade McNown	Jr

Defense

Pos.	#	Name	Class
CB	35	Larry Atkins	Jr
LB	50	Brendon Ayanbadejo	Jr

Special teams

Pos.	#	Name	Class
K	2	Chris Sailer

Head coach

- Bob Toledo

Coordinators/assistant coaches

Legend

- (C) Team captain
- (S) Suspended
- (I) Ineligible
- Injured
- Redshirt

== Awards and honors ==
Skip Hicks, Chad Overhauser, and Chris Sailer were selected to the 1997 College Football All-America Team.

== 1998 NFL draft ==
The following players were selected in the 1998 NFL draft.

Player	Round	Pick	Position	NFL team
Shaun Williams	1	24	Free Safety	New York Giants
Skip Hicks	3	69	Running back	Washington Redskins
Chad Overhauser	7	217	Offensive guard	Chicago Bears
