= 1997 Sun Bowl =

American college football game

1997 Norwest Sun Bowl
Iowa Hawkeyes	Arizona State Sun Devils
(7–4)	(8–3)
Big Ten	Pac-10
7	17
Head coach: Hayden Fry	Head coach: Bruce Snyder
	AP / Coaches / BA; 16 / 18 / 17
	1	2	3	4	Total
Iowa	0	0	0	7	7
Arizona State	0	10	7	0	17
- Date: December 31, 1997
- Season: 1997
- Stadium: Sun Bowl
- Location: El Paso, Texas
- Referee: Ken Flaherty (WAC)
- Payout: US$1,000,000 per team

United States TV coverage
- Network: CBS
- Announcers: Tim Ryan (play-by-play); Dave Logan (analyst); Scott Lasky (sidelines)

The 1997 Norwest Sun Bowl featured the Iowa Hawkeyes and the Arizona State Sun Devils.

After a scoreless first quarter, Arizona State scored first, with a 35-yard touchdown pass from quarterback Steve Campbell to wide receiver Lenzie Jackson to give ASU an early 7–0 lead. Kicker Robert Nycz kicked a 20-yard field goal to increase the lead to 10–0.

In the third quarter, running back Michael Martin scored on a 1-yard touchdown run to give ASU a 17–0 lead. In the fourth quarter, quarterback Randy Reiners threw a 26-yard touchdown pass to wide receiver Richard Carter.

== Teams ==
The game was played between the Iowa Hawkeyes from the Big Ten Conference and the Arizona State Sun Devils from the Pac-10 Conference. This was the first overall meeting and first postseason meeting between the programs.

=== Iowa Hawkeyes ===
Iowa entered the game with a 7–4 record (4–4 in conference). After lofty preseason expectations, they finished tied for sixth place in the Big Ten standings. The Hawkeyes went 1–2 versus the ranked teams they faced; losing at Ohio State and at Michigan in consecutive weeks before defeating Purdue at Kinnick Stadium.

=== Arizona State Sun Devils ===
Arizona entered the game with a 8–3 record (6–2 in conference). They finished in third place in the Pac-10 Conference standings. The Sun Devils were 3–1 against ranked opponents, defeating Miami (FL), Stanford, and Washington State while losing to Washington. They started their season 3–2, then won five in a row before finishing the regular season with a loss to rival Arizona.
