= 1997 USC Trojans football team =

American college football season

1997 USC Trojans football
- Conference: Pacific-10 Conference
- Record: 6–5 (4–4 Pac-10)
- Head coach: John Robinson (12th season)
- Offensive coordinator: Hue Jackson (1st season)
- Defensive coordinator: Keith Burns (4th season)
- Captains: Jonathan Himebauch; Brian Kelly
- Home stadium: Los Angeles Memorial Coliseum

1997 Pacific-10 Conference football standings
	Conf.			Overall
Team	W		L	W		L
No. 9 Washington State +	7	–	1	10	–	2
No. 5 UCLA +	7	–	1	10	–	2
No. 14 Arizona State	6	–	2	9	–	3
No. 18 Washington	5	–	3	8	–	4
Arizona	4	–	4	7	–	5
USC	4	–	4	6	–	5
Oregon	3	–	5	7	–	5
Stanford	3	–	5	5	–	6
California	1	–	7	3	–	8
Oregon State	0	–	8	3	–	8
+ – Conference co-champions; Rankings from AP Poll

The 1997 USC Trojans football team (variously "Trojans" or "USC") represented the University of Southern California during the 1997 NCAA Division I-A football season, finishing with a 6–5 record and tied for fifth place in the Pacific-10 Conference with a 4–4 conference record; despite a qualifying record, the Trojans were not invited to a bowl game. The team was coached by John Robinson, in his second stint as head coach of the Trojans, and played their home games at the Los Angeles Coliseum.

== Before the season ==
USC entered the preseason with 75 players from its 1996 squad that went a disappointing 6–6; it returned starters at 14 positions, eight on offense and six on defense along with both the punter and placekicker. The Trojans had a top 10-ranked recruiting class with 18 high school players and two transfer players from junior college programs; 16 of the 20 incoming players were All-Americans at previous levels. The Trojan running game, led by Delon Washington, hoped to improve a ground game that was ranked 90th in the nation; considered very disappointing at a school that had been known as "Tailback U". USC brought in Hue Jackson as the new Offensive coordinator; Jackson had previously served as offensive coordinator for California under Steve Mariucci, who had been hired to coach the NFL's San Francisco 49ers.

== Schedule ==
Date	Time	Opponent	Rank	Site	TV	Result	Attendance	Source
September 6	5:00 p.m.	No. 5 Florida State*	No. 23	Los Angeles Memorial Coliseum; Los Angeles, CA	ABC	L 7–14	72,783	
September 13	3:30 p.m.	Washington State	No. 23	Los Angeles Memorial Coliseum; Los Angeles, CA	FSN	L 21–28	51,655	
September 27	4:00 p.m.	at California		California Memorial Stadium; Berkeley, CA	ABC	W 27–17	54,000	
October 4	7:10 p.m.	UNLV*		Los Angeles Memorial Coliseum; Los Angeles, CA		W 35–21	48,404	
October 11	12:30 p.m.	at Arizona State		Sun Devil Stadium; Tempe, AZ	ABC	L 7–35	61,802	
October 18	11:30 a.m.	at Notre Dame*		Notre Dame Stadium; Notre Dame, IN (rivalry)	NBC	W 20–17	80,225	
October 25	7:15 p.m.	Oregon^{†}		Los Angeles Memorial Coliseum; Los Angeles, CA	FSN	W 24–22	53,640	
November 1	12:30 p.m.	at No. 7 Washington		Husky Stadium; Seattle, WA	ABC	L 0–27	73,401	
November 8	12:30 p.m.	Stanford		Los Angeles Memorial Coliseum; Los Angeles, CA (rivalry)	ABC	W 45–21	58,900	
November 15	1:00 p.m.	at Oregon State		Parker Stadium; Corvallis, OR		W 23–0	20,938	
November 22	12:30 p.m.	No. 7 UCLA		Los Angeles Memorial Coliseum; Los Angeles, CA (Victory Bell)	ABC	L 24–31	91,350	
*Non-conference game; ^{†}Homecoming; Rankings from AP Poll released prior to the game; All times are in Pacific time

== Rankings ==
Ranking movements Legend: ██ Increase in ranking ██ Decrease in ranking — = Not ranked
	Week																	
Poll	Pre	1	2	3	4	5	6	7	8	9	10	11	12	13	14	15	16	Final
AP	22	23	23	23	—	—	—	—	—	—	—	—	—	—	—	—	—	—
Coaches	22		21	22	—	—	—	—	—	—	—	—	—	—	—	—	—	—

== Game summaries ==
=== Florida State ===
	1	2	3	4	Total
Seminoles	7	0	0	7	14
Trojans	0	7	0	0	7

USC opened its season hosting the #5-ranked Florida State University Seminoles of the Atlantic Coast Conference, under long-time coach Bobby Bowden, in the first ever game between the two programs.

The Seminoles entered the game as a dominant force in college football, having finished in the top four of the final poll for 10 consecutive years behind teams famous for their speed and depth; the previous season the Seminoles went 11–1. The Trojans entered the season with a new quarterback, sophomore John Fox, after the graduation of veteran quarterback Brad Otton. The #23-ranked Trojans were a departure from Florida State's recent trend of season-opening opponents, which tended towards low-ranked teams in games played either at their home field or on a neutral field. The Trojans hoped to reestablish their running game, which had been anemic the previous season; however the Seminoles had allowed an average of only 59 yards rushing in 1996.

The Seminoles defeated the Trojans, 14–7, in a competitive, defense-oriented game. Florida State scored first: After recovering a fumble by USC Delon Washington at the USC 36, the Seminoles scored on a two-yard quarterback sneak with 2:10 left in the first quarter. The Trojans were able to respond in the second quarter, tying the score, 7–7, with 13:42 left in the half. The pivotal moment in the game came on a 97-yard Seminoles drive in the fourth quarter that resulted in the go-ahead score with 10:40 left in the game. The drive was almost stopped when cornerback Brian Kelly dropped a near-interception about 11 yards from Florida State's end zone. USC had two more drives, with the second reaching the Florida State 26-yard line before turning the ball over on downs.

USC was pleased with the performance of Fox, who in his first start completed 18 of 32 passes for 159 yards with one interception that came on a fourth-down play. However, the running game did not produce, totaling 25 yards with starting tailback Washington going for only 16 yards in 18 carries. The defense performed well, led by sophomore linebacker Chris Claiborne who had eight tackles, including two sacks. USC held the Seminoles to 89 yards rushing. Kelly broke up four passes, made five tackles and had an interception that was wiped out by an offside penalty against USC. Neither team did very well on third-down conversions; USC was 4 of 17, Florida State went 4 of 14.

Despite losing the game, the Trojans' performance was seen as a positive sign that the team was approaching the season with a drive not present until the very end of the previous season. USC remained ranked #23. Florida State would go on to an 11–1 record, winning the ACC conference and ending the season ranked #3 in the AP Poll.

=== Washington State ===
	1	2	3	4	Total
Cougars	7	14	0	7	28
Trojans	0	6	7	8	21

Opening Pac-10 Conference play, the USC hosted the Washington State Cougars under coach Mike Price. The Cougars arrived after a bye week; they defeated UCLA in their opening game, led by junior quarterback Ryan Leaf who passed for 381 yards and three touchdowns in a 37–34 victory. USC entered the game favored by a touchdown, and with a 10-game winning streak against Washington State, since 1986, and a home winning streak stretching back to 1957. The game was framed as the Trojans opportunity to set the tone of their season: They didn't drop in the polls after a close loss to highly ranked Florida State; a win against Cougars would help them start rising in the polls; a loss would likely undo any good will left over in voters.

"We were extremely disappointing. We choked in a thousand areas [. . .] We did it again to ourselves on offense. We weren't nearly as efficient as we were last week. We botched a number of things. People seemed to be confused. [. . .] It was one of the most disappointing running performances I've been involved with. [. . .] We botched everything [. . .] Some things communication-wise broke down."
— John Robinson describing his team's performance against Washington State

The Cougars defeated the Trojans, 28–21; it was the first time the Cougars had ever defeated UCLA and USC in the same season, and the first time they had won in the Coliseum in 40 years. Washington State had a strong first half, leading 21–6 at the end of the second quarter; the Trojans only touchdown had the extra-point blocked. John Fox fumbled a snap that led to Washington State's third touchdown. R. Jay Soward returned the second half kickoff 95 yards for a touchdown, spurring a USC rally. Early in the fourth quarter, the Trojans used a halfback pass for a touchdown, then went on to make a two-point conversion to tie the score, 21–21, with 12:44 remaining in the game. The USC defense held the Cougars for most of the second half; but Washington State finally moved ahead late in the fourth quarter, when Leaf connected with a receiver for a 51-yard touchdown with 4:18 left in the game.

Fox did not show the same level of poise as his start against Florida State; he completed 23 of 42 passes for 229 yards. Leaf completed 21 of 40 passes for 355 yards and three touchdowns, though he was intercepted twice by Brian Kelly. The Trojans running game continued to be a non-factor, totaling 31 yards at approximately one yard per carry. The concern started to focus on the offensive line, as Delon Washington rushed for 20 yards in eight carries; and given an opportunity, freshman Malaefou MacKenzie managed only 14 yards in 11 carries. USC had 10 penalties for 92 yards, often placing the offense in long second down situations.

Although the Cougars entered the game unranked, they would go on to have an excellent season, finishing 10–2, sharing the Pac-10 title and playing in the Rose Bowl for only the third time in school history. Leaf would go on to have a strong year, throwing for a school-record 3,968 yards and 34 touchdowns, being named a first team All-American and finishing third in the voting for the Heisman Trophy.

The Trojans fell out of the rankings; the loss marked the fifth time in 104 years of football that USC opened a season 0-2, prior to the season the only Trojan teams that began a season with two defeats were those of 1896, 1902, 1957 and 1960.

=== California ===
	1	2	3	4	Total
Trojans	14	13	0	0	27
Golden Bears	0	3	8	6	17

The Trojans played their first Pac-10 road game of the season, visiting the California Golden Bears, under first-year coach Tom Holmoe, at Memorial Stadium in Berkeley, California. The Golden Bears had defeated the Trojans the previous season, and hoped to make it a second year in a row for the first time since 1958.

The Trojans defense made seven sacks and forced Cal to punt eight times in a 27-17 victory. The Trojans surged to a 24-point halftime lead, but were held scoreless in the second as California tried to close the gap. R. Jay Soward caught two touchdown passes of 33 and 65 yards from John Fox; LaVale Woods rushed for 129 yards and two touchdowns. California receiver Bobby Shaw, who entered the game leading the nation, finished with five catches for 98 yards and one touchdown. The Trojans continued to have problems on special teams; kicker Adam Abrams missed a 34-yard field-goal attempt and an extra point, and allowed a blocked punt against punter Jim Wren.

Trojans offensive coordinator Hue Jackson, who had served in the same role for the Golden Bears the previous season, called plays from the field instead of the press box at head coach Robinson's request. USC entered the game ranked 112th among 112 Division I-A schools in net rushing yards. The offensive line reacted by inscribing the number "112" on their wrist bands before the game. The team made progress, gaining 123 yards in net rushing. The game allowed them to rise to 109th in rushing offense. On defense, USC held California to 31 rushing yards and ranked fifth nationally in rushing defense, giving up 54.3 yards a game.

The Trojans' victory ensured they would not go 0-3 for the first time since 1960.

=== UNLV ===
	1	2	3	4	Total
Rebels	0	7	7	7	21
Trojans	0	6	8	21	35

Next hosted UNLV of the Western Athletic Conference, under head coach Jeff Horton. The Trojans entered the game as 25-point favorites against the Rebels.

Running back LaVale Woods sprained his left ankle on the second possession, placing the running game back on freshman Malaefou MacKenzie and senior Delon Washington, who had been Woods had replaced for the previous game against California. MacKenzie ran for 104 yards in 19 carries and two touchdowns. The kicking game improved, with Adam Abrams making the Trojans' first field goals of the season from 27 and 37 yards before the end of the first half. Cornerback Daylon McCutcheon was used successfully on offensive plays, taking advantage of his overall athletic abilities.

The victory was coach John Robinson's 100th college victory.

=== Arizona State ===
	1	2	3	4	Total
Trojans					0
Sun Devils					0

=== Notre Dame ===
	1	2	3	4	Total
Trojans					0
Fighting Irish					0

=== Oregon ===
	1	2	3	4	Total
Ducks	0	3	7	12	22
Trojans	14	7	3	0	24

=== Washington ===
	1	2	3	4	Total
Trojans					0
Huskies					0

=== Stanford ===
	1	2	3	4	Total
Cardinal					0
Trojans					0

=== Oregon State ===
	1	2	3	4	Total
Trojans					0
Beavers					0

=== UCLA ===
	1	2	3	4	Total
Bruins					0
Trojans					0

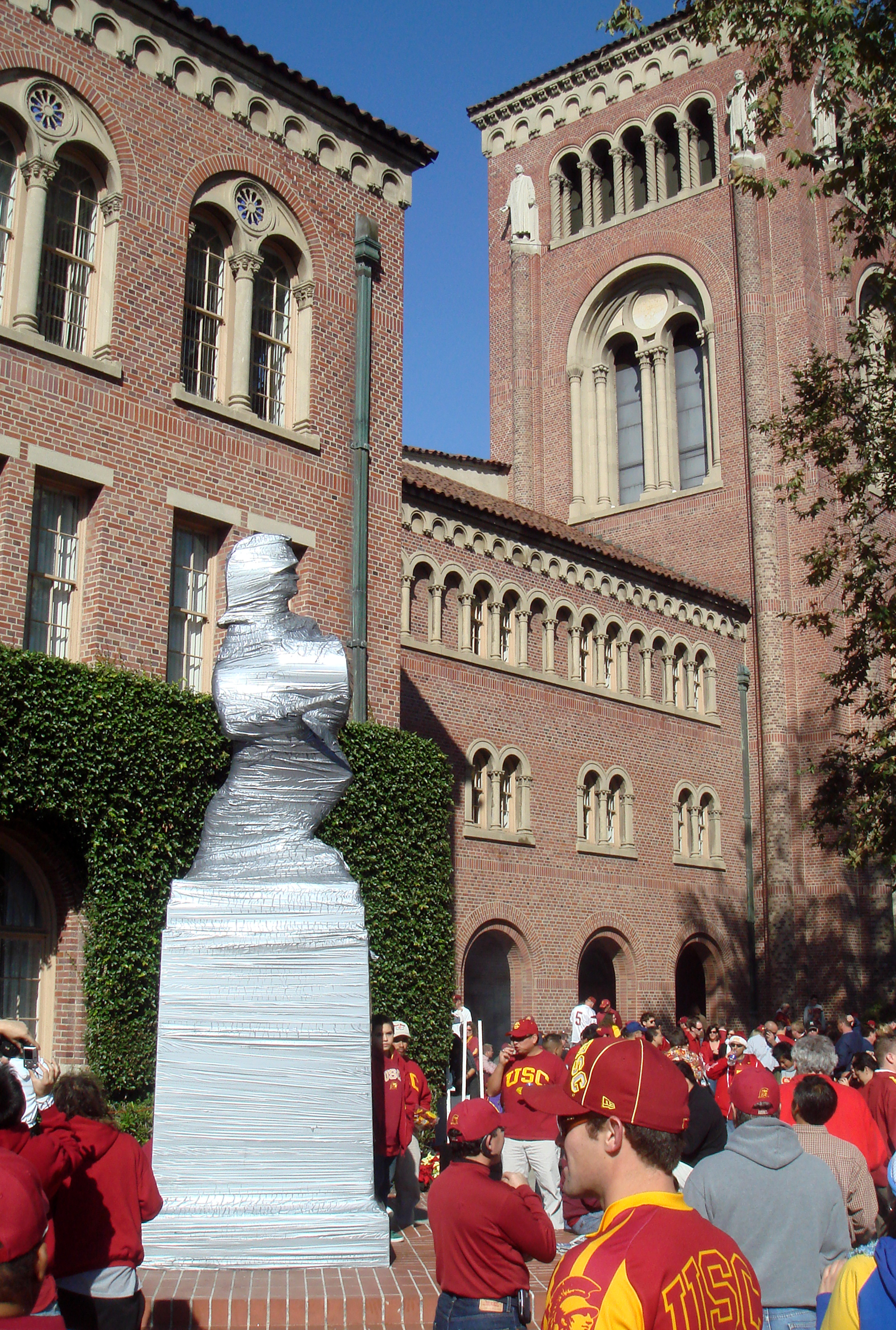
"Tommy Trojan" is wrapped in duct tape during the week preceding the game to protect it from vandalism.

== Personnel ==
=== Coaching staff ===
1997 USC Trojans coaching staff
Name	Position	Year at USC	Alma mater (year)
John Robinson	Head coach	12th	Oregon (1958)
Mike Barry	Assistant head coach/offensive line	5th	Southern Illinois (1969)
Keith Burns	Defensive coordinator/secondary	5th	Arkansas (1983)
Hue Jackson	Offensive coordinator/quarterbacks	1st	Pacific (1987)
Jeff McInerney	Defensive line	2nd	Slippery Rock (1982)
David Robinson	Linebackers	5th	Long Beach State (1986)
Doug Smith	Offensive line	5th	Bowling Green (1978)
Dennis Thurman	Secondary	5th	USC (1978)
Charles White	Running backs	5th	USC (1993)
Mike Wilson	Wide receivers	1st	Washington State (1981)

=== Roster ===
Wide receiver: 3 Billy Miller – Junior; 8 Troy Garner -; 13 Ken Haslip – Junior; 18 R. Jay Soward – Sophomore; 25 Mike Bastianelli – Junior; 80 Larry Parker – Junior; 87 Kevin McLaughlin; Center: 50 Eric Denmon – Sophomore; 56 Jonathan Himebauch – Senior; 60 Matt McShane -; Offensive guard: 60 David Pratchard -; 67 Chris Brymer –; 71 Travis Claridge – Sophomore; 79 Jason Grain – (redshirt) Sophomore; Offensive tackle: 73 Phalen Pounds –; 74 Ken Bowens – Junior; 78 Rome Douglas -; Tight end: 15 Junior Rickman – Senior; 81 Antoine Harris – Freshman; 84 Jeff Daley –	Quarterback: 4 John Fox – (redshirt) Sophomore; 9 Quincy Woods – Sophomore; 11 Mike Van Raaphorst – (redshirt) Freshman; Tailback: 7 Chad Morton – Sophomore; 21 Malaefou MacKenzie – Freshman; 24 Delon Washington – Senior; 35 Petros Papadakis – Sophomore; 47 Jahi Johnson -; Fullback: 5 Rodney Sermons – Senior; 30 LaVale Woods – Senior; 46 Ted Iacenda – (redshirt) Freshman; 48 Brennan Ochs – (redshirt) Freshman; Defensive tackle: 52 Dennis Tolbert –; 57 Aaron Williams – (redshirt) Sophomore; 95 Marc Matock –; 97 Cedric Jefferson – Senior; 99 Ennis Davis – (redshirt) Freshman; Defensive end: 44 Sultan Abdul-Malik – (redshirt) Freshman; 56 Lawrence Larry –; 88 George Perry – Senior	Cornerback: 1 Daylon McCutcheon – Junior; 42 Brian Kelly – (redshirt) Junior; Linebacker: 4 Mark Cusano – Junior; 9 Zeke Moreno – Freshman; 10 Jason Steen –; 22 David Gibson – Sophomore; 53 Jonathan Mosley –; 55 Chris Claiborne – Sophomore; __ Rocky Seto – Junior; Safety: 2 Darnell Lacy –; 6 Antuan Simmons – Freshman; 8 Rashard Cook – Junior; 31 Ifeanyi Ohalete – Freshman; 43 Grant Pearsall –; 45 Pierre Zado -; Long snapper: 84 Pat Swanson – Sophomore; Punter: 17 Jim Wren –; 37 Mike MacGillivray – Freshman; Place kicker: 11 Adam Rendon – Junior; 19 Adam Abrams – Junior; 37 David Bell – Sophomore
Sources: TributeToTroy Online Encyclopedia of Trojan football and The various articles cited throughout the article. ++ indicates that the player is a transfer who is ineligible to play 2007 season but is allowed to practice with scout team Players who left the team are struck out

== After the season ==
=== 1997 team players in the NFL ===
- Chris Claiborne
- Travis Claridge
- Rashard Cook
- Ennis Davis
- David Gibson
- Brian Kelly
- Malaefou MacKenzie
- Daylon McCutcheon
- Billy Miller
- Zeke Moreno
- Chad Morton
- Ifeanyi Ohalete
- R. Jay Soward
- Antuan Simmons
