= Cade McNown =

American football player (born 1977)

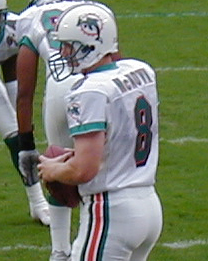
- McNown with the Miami Dolphins in 2001

No. 8, 9
- Position: Quarterback

Personal information
- Born: January 12, 1977 (age 49); Portland, Oregon, U.S.
- Listed height: 6 ft 1 in (1.85 m)
- Listed weight: 210 lb (95 kg)

Career information
- High school: West Linn (West Linn, Oregon)
- College: UCLA (1995–1998)
- NFL draft: 1999: 1st round, 12th overall pick

Career history
- Chicago Bears (1999–2000); Miami Dolphins (2001); San Francisco 49ers (2002)

Awards and highlights
- Johnny Unitas Golden Arm Award (1998); Pop Warner Trophy (1998); Consensus All-American (1998); Third-team All-American (1997); Pac 10 Co-Offensive Player of the Year (1998); First-team All-Pac-10 (1998); Second-team All-Pac-10 (1997)

Career NFL statistics
- Passing attempts: 515
- Passing completions: 281
- Completion percentage: 54.6%
- TD–INT: 16–19
- Passing yards: 3,111
- Passer rating: 67.7
- Stats at Pro Football Reference
- College Football Hall of Fame

Cade Brem McNown (born January 12, 1977) is an American former professional football quarterback who played in the National Football League (NFL) for four seasons. He played college football for the UCLA Bruins, winning the Johnny Unitas Golden Arm Award, the Pop Warner Trophy, and Pac 10 Co-Offensive Player of the Year in 1998. McNown was selected by the Chicago Bears in the first round of the 1999 NFL draft, but his tenure would only last two seasons due to injuries and inconsistent play. He spent his final two seasons as a backup for the Miami Dolphins and San Francisco 49ers. McNown was inducted to the College Football Hall of Fame in 2020.

== Early life ==
McNown was born in Portland, Oregon. He went to high school at San Benito High School in Hollister, California, before transferring as a senior to West Linn High School in West Linn, Oregon, where he played quarterback and free safety.

He led his high school to the 1994 Oregon Class 4A semifinals, becoming wildly touted by newspapers as a college prospect. He also was active on the school track team, where he set a school pole vault record. McNown signed with UCLA after high school. His selection of UCLA was influenced by future NFL quarterback Brock Huard signing with Washington. Huard, along with McNown, were the top high school quarterback prospects in the western United States in 1994.

== College career ==
McNown attended the University of California, Los Angeles (UCLA) and played for the Bruins from 1995 to 1998. He became the starting quarterback as a true freshman, four games into the season, ranking first among all freshmen quarterbacks in many statistics. In 1995, UCLA finished 7–5 and played in the Aloha Bowl (losing to Kansas).

McNown was less successful as a sophomore in 1996, when UCLA went 5–6 and he was ranked 9th in the Pac-10 in pass efficiency. The season ended on a high note as UCLA overcame a 17-point fourth quarter deficit to beat rival USC in overtime, 48–41.

As a junior in 1997, McNown announced the team's goal to score an average of 30 points per game. They ended up averaging 39.75 points per game. After an 0–2 start, UCLA won its remaining 10 games, including the 1998 Cotton Bowl Classic over Texas A&M, to finish Pac-10 co-champion and ranked No. 5 in the nation. McNown was named Most Outstanding Offensive Player for that year's Cotton Bowl Classic. He also was a finalist for the Davey O'Brien Award, was named an All-American by the Associated Press (third-team), The Sporting News (third-team), made the All-Pac-10 team (second-team) behind Washington State's Ryan Leaf, and finished eighth in the Heisman balloting. He led the nation in passing efficiency with a 168.6 rating. His play broke many UCLA records, most of which had been previously set by Tom Ramsey.

In his senior season in 1998, McNown led UCLA to a 10–2 record, including a Rose Bowl appearance as the sole Pac-10 champion. With McNown at the helm, the Bruins' explosive offense carried them on a school-record 20-game winning streak from the previous year, as they won their first 10 games in 1998, before losing to Miami Hurricanes in their regular season finale in a loss that broke the 20-game winning streak and knocked UCLA out of the BCS Championship Game vs. Tennessee. The disappointed Bruins then lost to Ron Dayne-led Wisconsin in the Rose Bowl, 38–31. McNown set numerous school records in passing and offense, became the Pac-10's all-time career leader in total offense, and won a collection of post-season honors, including Pac-10 co-Offensive Player of the Year, the Pop Warner Memorial Trophy for best senior player on the West Coast, consensus first-team All-American honors and the Johnny Unitas Award as the top senior quarterback in college football. McNown also finished third in balloting for the Heisman Trophy. In the 1999 Senior Bowl, McNown earned MVP honors as he threw two touchdowns in helping to lead the South team to victory.

For his career, McNown still holds many of the passing and total-offense records. McNown also holds the distinction of being the only UCLA quarterback to go 4–0 against cross-town rival USC. On October 9, 2009, McNown was inducted into the UCLA Athletics Hall of Fame. McNown was inducted into the Rose Bowl Hall of Fame on December 30, 2017. He was later inducted into the College Football Hall of Fame in 2020.

== Professional career ==
Pre-draft measurables
Height	Weight	Arm length	Hand span	40-yard dash	10-yard split	20-yard split	20-yard shuttle	Three-cone drill	Vertical jump	Broad jump
6 ft 0 7/8 in (1.85 m)	213 lb (97 kg)	30 in (0.76 m)	9 3/8 in (0.24 m)	4.73 s	1.60 s	2.72 s	4.28 s	7.27 s	33.5 in (0.85 m)	9 ft 5 in (2.87 m)
All values from NFL Combine

=== Chicago Bears ===
Following the NFL Scouting Combine, some scouts questioned the strength of his throwing arm. McNown, along with Akili Smith, Daunte Culpepper, and Donovan McNabb, appeared on the cover of ESPN The Magazine in the issue highlighting the draft. He was selected by the Chicago Bears with the twelfth overall pick in the first round of the 1999 NFL draft, following a draft pick trade with the Washington Redskins. He was the highest-drafted Bears quarterback since Jim McMahon.

In the months preceding draft day, the Bears had declared that Erik Kramer would be the starting quarterback, but waived him prior to signing McNown. McNown held out for most of training camp, missing 11 days before eventually agreeing to a $22 million contract. Following the preseason, head coach Dick Jauron announced Shane Matthews would be the starter but that McNown would play at least one series every game to gain experience.

McNown started his first game for the Bears on October 10 against the Philadelphia Eagles, taking over following a hamstring injury to Matthews the previous week. He completed 17 of 33 passes for 255 yards, a touchdown, and two interceptions as the Bears rallied from a 20–6 deficit but lost by four points. Early in a 14–13 win over the Green Bay Packers, he suffered a sprained right knee and was replaced by third-string quarterback Jim Miller. McNown returned to the starting role following Miller's suspension. Against the Detroit Lions, he set franchise rookie records with 27 completions, 301 yards and 4 touchdowns as the Bears won 28–10; McNown was also the first Bears rookie quarterback to throw for 300 yards in a game. He was injured again the week after in St. Louis, missing the second half with a strained right thigh. In the season-ending loss to the Tampa Bay Buccaneers, McNown threw 42 passes, which was the Bears' single-game rookie record before being snapped by Caleb Williams' 52 against the Indianapolis Colts in 2024.

He was named the Bears' 2000 starter over Matthews (Miller was injured during the preseason), but his performance grew noticeably worse through the season. The Bears under McNown fell to 1–6, leading the home crowd to regularly chant for Miller's return. McNown suffered a shoulder injury during the seventh game of the season against Philadelphia, was briefly replaced by Miller, who also suffered an injury and was replaced by Matthews. McNown started one more game that season, losing 17–0 to San Francisco as he completed just 9 of 29 passes for 73 yards with an interception. He was benched for Matthews for the season finale in Detroit, but came in after Matthews was injured again and led the Bears to an upset win that eliminated the Lions from what appeared to be a sure playoff berth.

McNown lasted two seasons with the Bears, recording a 3–12 record as a starter. Due to his performance, he is considered one of the worst draft picks in team and league history. His generally cocky attitude also frequently put him at odds with fans and other players: he told booing fans to stay home from games, and remarked following a 2000 loss to the New York Giants that his receivers were likely "tired" when he overthrew them four times. Following the loss to the 49ers that year, a Chicago Tribune report stated elements of the locker room were "in near revolt" over his performance, and his teammates made little effort to refute the story. Some players mentioned one of McNown's significant issues was his tendency to boast about his $6.1 million signing bonus in front of veteran players who were earning the league's minimum salary, while he did not attend as many offseason workouts as his fellow quarterbacks and often left early. After McNown was ordered to apologize for skipping a charity event, Northwest Herald writer Mike Gibb wrote that although he was young, "immaturity in an NFL quarterback cannot and should not be tolerated" and that "more should be expected of McNown, who is making millions of dollars."

=== Miami Dolphins ===
McNown's personality and drop down the depth chart behind Miller and Matthews prompted the Bears to trade him to the Miami Dolphins during the 2001 preseason. He was sent to Miami along with a seventh-round pick for a sixth rounder and a conditional 2003 seventh-round pick.

As the third-string quarterback for the Dolphins, he saw no action during the season.

=== San Francisco 49ers ===
The Dolphins traded McNown to the San Francisco 49ers for a conditional seventh-round draft pick during the 2002 offseason. By then, Terry Donahue, former head coach at UCLA, was the general manager. Interest was briefly raised in McNown, as the 49ers were searching for a quarterback for the West Coast offense. Although he was initially competing against Tim Rattay, Giovanni Carmazzi, and Brandon Doman for the backup spot behind starter Jeff Garcia, McNown reinjured his shoulder during the preseason. When it was revealed he required season-ending surgery, he was placed on injured reserve. McNown was released by the 49ers during the 2003 offseason. His rights were shortly thereafter acquired by the Calgary Stampeders, although he was never signed.

== Career statistics ==
=== NFL ===
Year	Team	Games		Passing								Rushing			
Year	Team	GP	GS	Cmp	Att	Pct	Yds	Y/A	TD	Int	Rtg	Att	Yds	Avg	TD
1999	CHI	15	6	127	235	54.0	1,465	6.2	8	10	66.7	32	160	5.0	0
2000	CHI	10	9	154	280	55.0	1,646	5.9	8	9	68.5	50	326	6.5	3
Career		25	15	281	515	54.6	3,111	6.0	16	19	67.7	82	486	5.9	3

=== College ===
Season	Team	Passing								Rushing			
Season	Team	Cmp	Att	Pct	Yds	Y/A	TD	Int	Rtg	Att	Yds	Avg	TD
1995	UCLA	122	245	49.8	1,698	6.9	7	8	110.9	71	311	4.4	5
1996	UCLA	176	336	52.4	2,424	7.2	12	16	115.2	88	58	0.7	4
1997	UCLA	189	312	60.6	3,116	10.0	24	6	166.0	79	26	0.3	4
1998	UCLA	207	357	58.0	3,470	9.7	25	11	156.6	75	182	2.4	3
Career		694	1,250	55.5	10,708	8.6	68	41	138.9	313	577	1.8	16

== Awards and honors ==
- Pop Warner Trophy (1998)
- Consensus All-American (1998)
- Third-team All-American (1997)
- Pac 10 Co-Offensive Player of the Year (1998)
- First-team All-Pac-10 (1998)
- Second-team All-Pac-10 (1997)
- Cotton Bowl MVP (1998)
- Senior Bowl MVP (1999)
- Rose Bowl Hall of Fame (2017)
- UCLA Athletics Hall of Fame (2009)
- College Football Hall of Fame (2020)

== Personal life ==
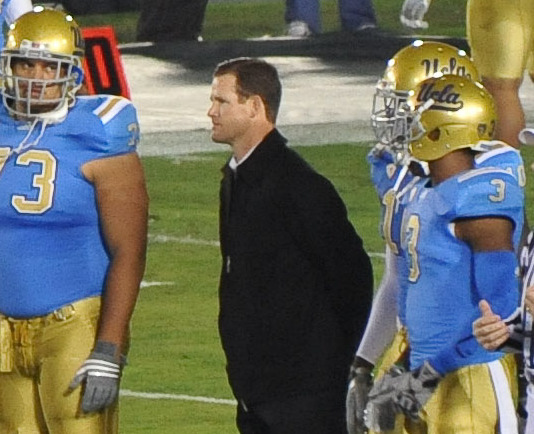
McNown doing the coin toss at a UCLA football game in 2010

McNown was charged in September 1999 with the illegal possession of a disabled parking pass while playing football at UCLA in 1996, to which he pleaded no contest. Other players charged included Skip Hicks, Larry Atkins, Marques Anderson, and Brendon Ayanbadejo.

In 2000, it was reported that McNown had been dating 1999 Playboy Playmate of the Year Heather Kozar, and future (2001) Playmate of the Year Brande Roderick.

McNown is married to Christina Brascia, daughter of actor and dancer John Brascia and actress and model Sondra Scott. As of June 2016, he and Christina have four children.

McNown later worked for UBS in the private wealth group before joining JPMorgan Chase Private Bank. In 2013, McNown joined capital management firm Lourd Murray as a vice president. In 2016, McNown joined Kayne Anderson as a senior managing director. In June 2022, McNown joined The Carlyle Group as a managing director and Client Relationship Manager.

On October 22, 2021, Tunnel 8 at the Rose Bowl was named in McNown's honor.

== See also ==
- List of NCAA Division I FBS quarterbacks with at least 10,000 career passing yards
- List of NCAA major college football yearly passing leaders
