= Henry Foss =

American politician

Henry O. Foss (September 5, 1891 – April 1986) was an elected official, businessman and civic leader in Tacoma, Washington. It is after his mother that the famed Tugboat Annie series was written. Henry Foss High School in Tacoma, Washington is named after him.

== Biography ==
Foss was one of four children born to Norwegian immigrant parents, Andrew and Thea Foss, first owners and operators of Foss Launch and Tug Company. He graduated from Tacoma (now Stadium) High School in 1911 and went to work for his parents in the family business. He graduated from Stanford University in 1916.

Foss piloted newly built ships for launching during World War I as the skipper of the tugboat Foss-Berg. During World War II, Foss was on active duty with the US Navy in naval intelligence. He served at the Naval Salvage School in New York, and became deputy fleet salvage officer with Commander Service Force South Pacific at Pearl Harbor. He retired with the rank of rear admiral and was awarded the Legion of Merit and the Navy Marine Lifesaving Medal.

While serving in the Pacific, he bunked with future United States president Richard Nixon, who gave Foss the nickname "Falcon" for his ability to locate poker games on different ships. "Falcons" eventually became the nickname for the Henry Foss High School sports teams.

From 1930 to 1934, he served as state senator from the 26th District, was Pierce County Republican chairman from 1932 to 1934, and later served as commissioner for the Port of Tacoma. He was director of Pacific National Bank of Washington and in 1962 was elected as the bank's first honorary director, serving until he retired in 1971.

== Other sources ==
- Stork, Mike Foss Maritime Company (WA) (Images of America) (Arcadia Publishing: 2007)
