= 1997 All-America college football team =

Official list of the best college football players of 1997

The 1997 All-America college football team is composed of the following All-American Teams: Associated Press (AP), Football Writers Association of America (FWAA), American Football Coaches Association (AFCA), Walter Camp Football Foundation (WCFF), The Sporting News (TNS) and Football News (FN).

The College Football All-America Team is an honor given annually to the best American college football players at their respective positions. The original usage of the term All-America seems to have been to such a list selected by football pioneer Walter Camp in the 1890s. The NCAA officially recognizes All-Americans selected by the AP, AFCA, FN, FWAA, TSN, and the WCFF to determine Consensus All-Americans.

== Offense ==
=== Quarterback ===
- Peyton Manning, Tennessee (AP-1, AFCA, FN, FWAA, WCFF)
- Ryan Leaf, Washington State (AP-2, TSN)
- Cade McNown, UCLA (AP-3)

=== Running backs ===
- Ricky Williams, Texas (AP-1, AFCA-Coaches, FN, FWAA-Writers, WCFF, TSN)
- Curtis Enis, Penn State (AP-1, FWAA-Writers, WCFF)
- Skip Hicks, UCLA (AP-2, AFCA-Coaches, TSN)
- Ron Dayne, Wisconsin (FN)
- Ahman Green, Nebraska (AP-2)
- Tavian Banks, Iowa (AP-3)
- Fred Taylor, Florida (AP-3)

=== Wide receivers ===
- Randy Moss, Marshall (AP-1, AFCA-Coaches, FN, FWAA-Writers, TSN, WCFF)
- Jacquez Green, Florida (AP-1, FWAA, WCFF)
- Jerome Pathon, Washington (AFCA)
- Brian Alford, Purdue (AP-2, FN)
- E. G. Green, Florida State (AP-2)
- Troy Edwards, Louisiana Tech (AP-3)
- Bobby Shaw, California (AP-3)

=== Tight end ===
- Alonzo Mayes, Oklahoma State (AP-1, AFCA-Coaches, FWAA-Writers, WCFF, TSN)
- Jerame Tuman, Michigan (AP-2, FN)
- Rufus French, Ole Miss (AP-3)

=== Guards/tackles ===
- Aaron Taylor, Nebraska (AP-1, AFCA-Coaches, FN, FWAA-Writers, Walter Camp, TSN)
- Alan Faneca, LSU (AP-1, FN, FWAA-Writers, Walter Camp)
- Kyle Turley, San Diego State (AP-2, AFCA-Coaches, FN, FWAA-Writers, TSN)
- Chad Overhauser, UCLA (AP-1, FWAA-Writers, TSN)
- Benji Olson, Washington (AP-1, Walter Camp)
- Victor Riley, Auburn (AP-2, AFCA-Coaches)
- Matt Stinchcomb, Georgia (AP-3, AFCA-Coaches)
- Flozell Adams, Michigan State (AP-2, Walter Camp)
- Rob Murphy, Ohio State (FN)
- Tra Thomas, Florida State (AP-2)
- Eric Anderson, Nebraska (AP-3)
- Jim Bundren, Clemson (AP-3)
- Kyle Murphy, Arizona State (AP-3)

=== Center ===
- Olin Kreutz, Washington (AP-1, FN, WCFF, TSN)
- Kevin Long, Florida State (AP-3, AFCA-Coaches)
- Ben Fricke, Houston (AP-2, FWAA-Writers)

== Defense ==
=== Linemen ===
- Andre Wadsworth, Florida State (AP-1, AFCA-Coaches, FN, Walter Camp, TSN)
- Grant Wistrom, Nebraska (AP-1, AFCA-Coaches, FWAA-Writers, Walter Camp, TSN)
- Greg Ellis, North Carolina (AP-1, AFCA-Coaches, FN, Walter Camp)
- Jason Peter, Nebraska (AP-1, FWAA-Writers, Walter Camp, TSN)
- Glen Steele, Michigan (AP-2, AFCA-Coaches)
- Jeremy Staat, Arizona State (AP-2, FWAA-Writers)
- Lamanzer Williams, Minnesota (AP-3, FWAA-Writers)
- Kailee Wong, Stanford (FN)
- Jared DeVries, Iowa (AP-2)
- Leon Bender, Washington State (AP-3)
- Ed Chester, Florida (AP-3)
- Henry Slay, West Virginia (AP-3)

=== Linebackers ===
- Andy Katzenmoyer, Ohio State (AP-1, AFCA-Coaches, FN, FWAA-Writers, Walter Camp)
- Sam Cowart, Florida State (AP-1, FN, FWAA-Writers, TSN)
- Anthony Simmons, Clemson (AP-1, AFCA-Coaches, TSN)
- Brian Simmons, North Carolina (AP-1, FN, Walter Camp)
- Jamie Duncan, Vanderbilt (AP-2, AFCA-Coaches, FWAA-Writers)
- Leonard Little, Tennessee (AP-2, Walter Camp)
- Takeo Spikes, Auburn (AP-2, TSN)
- Pat Tillman, Arizona State (AP-2, TSN)
- Ron Warner, Kansas (FN)
- Sam Sword, Michigan (AP-2)
- Daryl Bush, Florida State (AP-3)
- Kivuusama Mays, North Carolina (AP-3)
- Ike Reese, Michigan State (AP-3)
- Chris Gizzi, Air Force (AP-3)

=== Backs ===
- Charles Woodson, Michigan (AP-1, AFCA-Coaches, FN, FWAA-Writers, Walter Camp, TSN)
- Dré Bly, North Carolina (AP-1, FN, FWAA-Writers, Walter Camp)
- Donovin Darius, Syracuse (AP-1, AFCA-Coaches, TSN)
- Brian Lee, Wyoming (AP-1, FN, FWAA-Writers, Walter Camp)
- Fred Weary, Florida (AP-2, AFCA-Coaches, FN, Walter Camp, TSN)
- Antoine Winfield, Ohio State (AP-2, AFCA-Coaches, FWAA-Writers)
- Anthony Poindexter, Virginia (TSN, AP-3)
- Marcus Ray, Michigan (AP-2)
- Shaun Williams, UCLA (AP-2)
- Larry Atkins, UCLA (AP-3)
- Kevin Williams, Oklahoma State (AP-3)
- Patrick Surtain, Southern Mississippi (AP-3)

== Specialists ==
=== Placekicker ===
- Martín Gramática, Kansas State (AP-1, FN, FWAA-Writers, TSN)
- Chris Sailer, UCLA (AP-2, AFCA-Coaches, WCFF)
- Brad Palazzo, Tulane (AP-3)

=== Punter ===
- Chad Kessler, LSU (AP-1, FN, WCFF, TSN)
- Chris Sailer, UCLA (FWAA-Writers)
- Shane Lechler, Texas A&M (AP-2)
- John Baker, North Texas (AP-3)

=== All-purpose / kick returners ===
- Tim Dwight, Iowa (AP-All-Purpose-1, AFCA-Coaches, FWAA-Writers, TSN)
- Quinton Spotwood, Syracuse (AP-All-Purpose-2)
- Kevin Faulk, LSU (AP-All-Purpose-3)

== See also ==
- 1997 All-ACC football team
- 1997 All-Big 12 Conference football team
- 1997 All-Big Ten Conference football team
- 1997 All-Pacific-10 Conference football team
- 1997 All-SEC football team
