= Benji Olson =

American football player (born 1975)

No. 75
- Position: Guard

Personal information
- Born: June 5, 1975 (age 51); Bremerton, Washington, U.S.
- Listed height: 6 ft 4 in (1.93 m)
- Listed weight: 320 lb (145 kg)

Career information
- High school: South Kitsap (Port Orchard, Washington)
- College: Washington
- NFL draft: 1998: 5th round, 139th overall pick

Career history
- Tennessee Oilers / Titans (1998–2007)

Awards and highlights
- Consensus All-American (1996); First-team All-American (1997); 2× First-team All-Pac-10 (1996, 1997); Second-team All-Pac-10 (1995)

Career NFL statistics
- Games played: 152
- Games started: 140
- Fumble recoveries: 3
- Stats at Pro Football Reference

Benjamin Dempsey Olson (born June 5, 1975) is an American former professional football player who was a guard for 10 seasons in the National Football League (NFL). He played college football for the Washington Huskies, earning consensus All-American honors in 1996. He was selected by the Tennessee Oilers in the fifth round of the 1998 NFL draft and played his entire career with the Tennessee organization.

== Early life ==
Olson was born in Bremerton, Washington. He attended South Kitsap High School in Port Orchard, Washington, and was a letterman in high school football, wrestling and track and field for the South Kitsap Wolves. In football, as a senior, he was named as second-team All-USA selection by USA Today. In track and field, he was third at the state championship meet as a junior and fourth as a senior.

== College career ==
Olson attended the University of Washington and played for the Washington Huskies football team from 1994 to 1997. As a junior in 1996, he was recognized as a consensus first-team All-American at guard. As a senior in 1997, he was a first-team All-America selection by the Associated Press and the Walter Camp Foundation.

== Professional career ==
The Tennessee Oilers selected Olson in the fifth round (139th pick overall) of the 1998 NFL Draft. He played for the Oilers (later called the Tennessee Titans) from 1998 to 2007. After his rookie season, he started every game in which he played, including a total of 140 of the 152 regular season games in which he appeared. In 1999, the Titans made it to Super Bowl XXXIV in which Olson started. They lost to the Kurt Warner-led St. Louis Rams.
