= 1997 California Golden Bears football team =

American college football season

1997 California Golden Bears football
- Conference: Pacific-10 Conference
- Record: 3–8 (1–7 Pac-10)
- Head coach: Tom Holmoe (1st season)
- Offensive coordinator: Doug Cosbie (1st season)
- Defensive coordinator: Lyle Setencich (1st season)
- Home stadium: California Memorial Stadium

1997 Pacific-10 Conference football standings
	Conf.			Overall
Team	W		L	W		L
No. 9 Washington State +	7	–	1	10	–	2
No. 5 UCLA +	7	–	1	10	–	2
No. 14 Arizona State	6	–	2	9	–	3
No. 18 Washington	5	–	3	8	–	4
Arizona	4	–	4	7	–	5
USC	4	–	4	6	–	5
Oregon	3	–	5	7	–	5
Stanford	3	–	5	5	–	6
California	1	–	7	3	–	8
Oregon State	0	–	8	3	–	8
+ – Conference co-champions; Rankings from AP Poll

The 1997 California Golden Bears football team was an American football team that represented the University of California, Berkeley as a member of the Pacific-10 Conference (Pac-10) during the 1997 NCAA Division I-A football season. In their first year under head coach Tom Holmoe, the Golden Bears compiled an overall record of 3–8 record with a mark of 1–7 against conference opponents, placing ninth in the Pac-10, and were outscored by opponents 339 to 295. The team played home games at California Memorial Stadium in Berkeley, California.

The team's statistical leaders included Justin Vedder with 2,718 passing yards, Tarik Smith with 636 rushing yards, and Bobby Shaw with 1,093 receiving yards.

== Schedule ==
Date	Time	Opponent	Site	TV	Result	Attendance	Source
September 6	12:30 p.m.	at Houston*	Houston Astrodome; Houston, TX	KPIX	W 35–3	37,652	
September 20	3:30 p.m.	Oklahoma*^{†}	California Memorial Stadium; Berkeley, CA	FSN	W 40–36	48,260	
September 27	4:00 p.m.	USC	California Memorial Stadium; Berkeley, CA	ABC	L 17–27	54,000	
October 4	5:00 p.m.	at Louisiana Tech*	Independence Stadium; Shreveport, LA	SCBA	L 34–41	24,812	
October 11	12:30 p.m.	No. 10 Washington	California Memorial Stadium; Berkeley, CA		L 3–30	48,000	
October 18	2:00 p.m.	at No. 13 Washington State	Martin Stadium; Pullman, WA		L 37–63	35,759	
October 25	3:30 p.m.	at No. 13 UCLA	Rose Bowl; Pasadena, CA (rivalry)		L 17–35	52,858	
November 1	12:30 p.m.	at Oregon State	Parker Stadium; Corvallis, OR		W 33–14	32,000	
November 8	12:30 p.m.	No. 15 Arizona State	California Memorial Stadium; Berkeley, CA	FSN	L 21–28	33,000	
November 15	7:00 p.m.	at Arizona	Arizona Stadium; Tucson, AZ	FSN	L 38–41 ^{2OT}	37,111	
November 22	12:30 p.m.	at Stanford	Stanford Stadium; Stanford, CA (Big Game)	ABC	L 20–21	85,500	
*Non-conference game; ^{†}Homecoming; Rankings from AP Poll released prior to the game; All times are in Pacific time

== Game summaries ==
=== Arizona ===
- Dameane Douglas 12 rec, 143 yds

=== At Stanford ===
California Golden Bears (3–8) at Stanford Cardinal (4–6)

Quarter	1	2	3	4	Total
California	0	10	0	10	20
Stanford	7	14	0	0	21

at Stanford Stadium, Stanford, California

- Date: November 22
- Game attendance: 85,000
- TV: ABC
- Box Score

Game information

First quarter

- STAN – Corey Hill 41-yard interception return (Kevin Miller kick), 2:32. Stanford 7–0.

Second quarter

- STAN – Anthony Bookman 13 yard run (kick failed), 9:34. Stanford 13–0. Drive:
- CAL – Tarik Smith 19-yard run (Tim Wolleck kick), 7:58. Stanford 13–7. Drive: 6 plays, 74 yards.
- STAN – Troy Walters 36-yard pass from Chad Hutchinson (pass good), 4:02. Stanford 21–7. Drive:
- CAL – Ignacio Brache 46-yard field goal, 0:00. Stanford 21–10. Drive:

Third quarter

- No scoring

Fourth quarter

- CAL – Bobby Shaw 12-yard pass from Justin Vedder (pass good), 4:46. Stanford 21–18. Drive: 11 plays, 77 yards.
- CAL – Safety, 0:19. Stanford 21–20.

Top passers

- CAL –
- STAN –

Top rushers

- CAL –
- STAN –

Top receivers

- CAL – Dameane Douglas – 11 receptions, 143 yards
- STAN –

100th meeting

== Roster ==
- LB Matt Beck
- Jerry DeLoach (defense)
- WR Dameane Douglas
- Chidi Iwuoma (Fr, defense)
- Deltha O'Neal
- Bruce Pierre (offense)
- Kato Serwanga (defense)
- WR Bobby Shaw
- Marquise Smith (defense)
- Brian Surgener (offense)
- QB Justin Vedder
- Jacob Waasdorp (Fr, defense)
