= John Baker (punter) =

American football player (born 1977)

No. 4
- Position: Punter

Personal information
- Born: April 22, 1977 (age 49); Beaumont, Texas, U.S.
- Listed height: 6 ft 3 in (1.91 m)
- Listed weight: 223 lb (101 kg)

Career information
- High school: Brenham (Brenham, Texas)
- College: North Texas
- NFL draft: 2000: undrafted

Career history
- Indianapolis Colts (2000)*; St. Louis Rams (2000–2001); Houston Texans (2002)*
- * Offseason or practice squad member only

Awards and highlights
- Third-team All-American (1997)

Career NFL statistics
- Punting yards: 3,545
- Punting average: 41.2
- Longest punt: 59
- Inside the 20-yard line: 22
- Stats at Pro Football Reference

John David Baker (born April 22, 1977) is an American former professional football player who was a punter in the National Football League (NFL). He was signed by the St. Louis Rams as an undrafted free agent in 2000. He played college football for the North Texas Mean Green.

Baker was the punter for the Rams during Super Bowl XXXVI.
