= Jeremy Staat =

American athlete and United States Marine

No. 92, 94, 95
- Positions: Defensive lineman, offensive lineman

Personal information
- Born: October 10, 1976 (age 50); Bakersfield, California, U.S.
- Listed height: 6 ft 6 in (1.98 m)
- Listed weight: 300 lb (136 kg)

Career information
- High school: Bakersfield
- College: Arizona State
- NFL draft: 1998: 2nd round, 41st overall pick

Career history
- Pittsburgh Steelers (1998–2000); Seattle Seahawks (2001)*; Oakland Raiders (2002)*; St. Louis Rams (2003); Los Angeles Avengers (2004)
- * Offseason or practice squad member only

Awards and highlights
- First-team All-American (1997); Morris Trophy (1997); Second-team All-Pac-10 (1997)

Career NFL statistics
- Tackles: 20
- Stats at Pro Football Reference

Jeremy Ray Staat (born October 10, 1976) is an American former professional football player who was a defensive lineman and offensive lineman who played in the National Football League (NFL) for the Pittsburgh Steelers from 1998 through 2000 and the St. Louis Rams for two games in 2003. He also played for the Los Angeles Avengers of the Arena Football League (AFL). After his football career, he enlisted in the United States Marine Corps and was deployed to Iraq. On September 17, 2019, Staat, a registered Republican, announced his candidacy for Congress in California's 8th District.

== Football career ==
Staat was a two-sport star in Bakersfield High School in Bakersfield, California, where he was All-Area selection. He then attended Bakersfield College, a junior college, where he played offensive and defensive line for two years while also excelling in track and field. After initially expressing interest in transferring to the University of Nebraska–Lincoln as a walk on, he was offered a full ride scholarship to Arizona State University as a defensive lineman.

At ASU, Staat became friends with free safety Pat Tillman, and was a roommate with Tillman's brother for a semester. While playing for the Sun Devils, he won the Morris Trophy as the best defensive lineman in the Pac-10 Conference in 1997 and was named a FWAA First-team All-American.

In the 1998 NFL draft, the Pittsburgh Steelers selected Staat with the 41st overall pick. The Steelers had debated about whether to take Staat or Alan Faneca with their first round pick but ultimately was able to take both. He played three seasons in Pittsburgh, starting in eleven games in the 1999 season. He would sign with the Seattle Seahawks in 2001 but would be cut from the team following the preseason. Cut by a football team for the first time in his life, Staat began seriously considering joining the military following the September 11, 2001 attacks. However, Tillman, who had quit a lucrative career with the Arizona Cardinals to become a U.S. Army Ranger after the attacks, talked Staat into staying in the league for at least three more games to earn his NFL retirement benefits.

In 2002, he signed with the Oakland Raiders and was moved to offensive guard by Bill Callahan. He would be cut during the preseason, however, after Jon Gruden was traded to the Tampa Bay Buccaneers. Despite speculation that he would reunite with Jake Plummer on the Arizona Cardinals, following an injury to defensive lineman Tom Burke, he would ultimately remain unsigned. Staat eventually earned his pension during a stint with the St. Louis Rams during the 2003 season after transitioning back to the defensive line. The following season, he joined the Los Angeles Avengers of the Arena Football League. During the season, he learned Tillman had been killed in action in Afghanistan, in what was later revealed to be a "friendly fire" incident. The loss of his friend further reduced his interest in football. He would throw his helmet during the middle of practice and storm off the field, leaving the Avengers and professional football forever.

== Post-football career ==
Immediately after football, one of Staat's friends got him a job working at a Walgreens drug store. Staat, like Tillman's family, was dismayed by the United States Army's handling of the story surrounding Tillman's death; himself noting that "The fog around his death was thickened by lies." However, after spending time deciding on his own future, he opted to follow his deceased friend and teammate's example and join the military; but instead of the Army, he joined the United States Marine Corps.

Staat joined the Marine Corps in December of 2005. In March 2007, Lance Corporal Staat deployed with 1st Battalion 3rd Marines for a seven-month mission in Iraq. He was an infantry machine gunner and drove around in seven-ton armored trucks used to transport soldiers.

Staat's Iraq tour was fairly quiet, his unit suffered two injuries and no one was killed in action. His opinions changed: "It wasn't a blood fest, like some people make it out to be. It was pretty controlled. We had a pretty good sense of security. My eyes were opened up. They [the Iraqis] were just people. I expected to see guys running around with AK-47s, shouting about Allah and shooting into the sky." After returning from his tour, he started to have back, hip and heart problems. He was put on light duty and began the process of seeking a medical discharge.

Following his military career, Staat opted to return and finish his degree. He graduated from Arizona State University in 2009 with a master's degree, and returned to his hometown of Bakersfield, where he teaches welding at Bakersfield College.

In 2019, Staat announced that he would be running for Congress in the 2020 Election on the Republican Party ticket for California's 8th congressional district. He lost in the March primary to Jay Obernolte.
