= 1997 Las Vegas Bowl =

1997 Las Vegas Bowl presented by Reno Air
- 6th Las Vegas Bowl
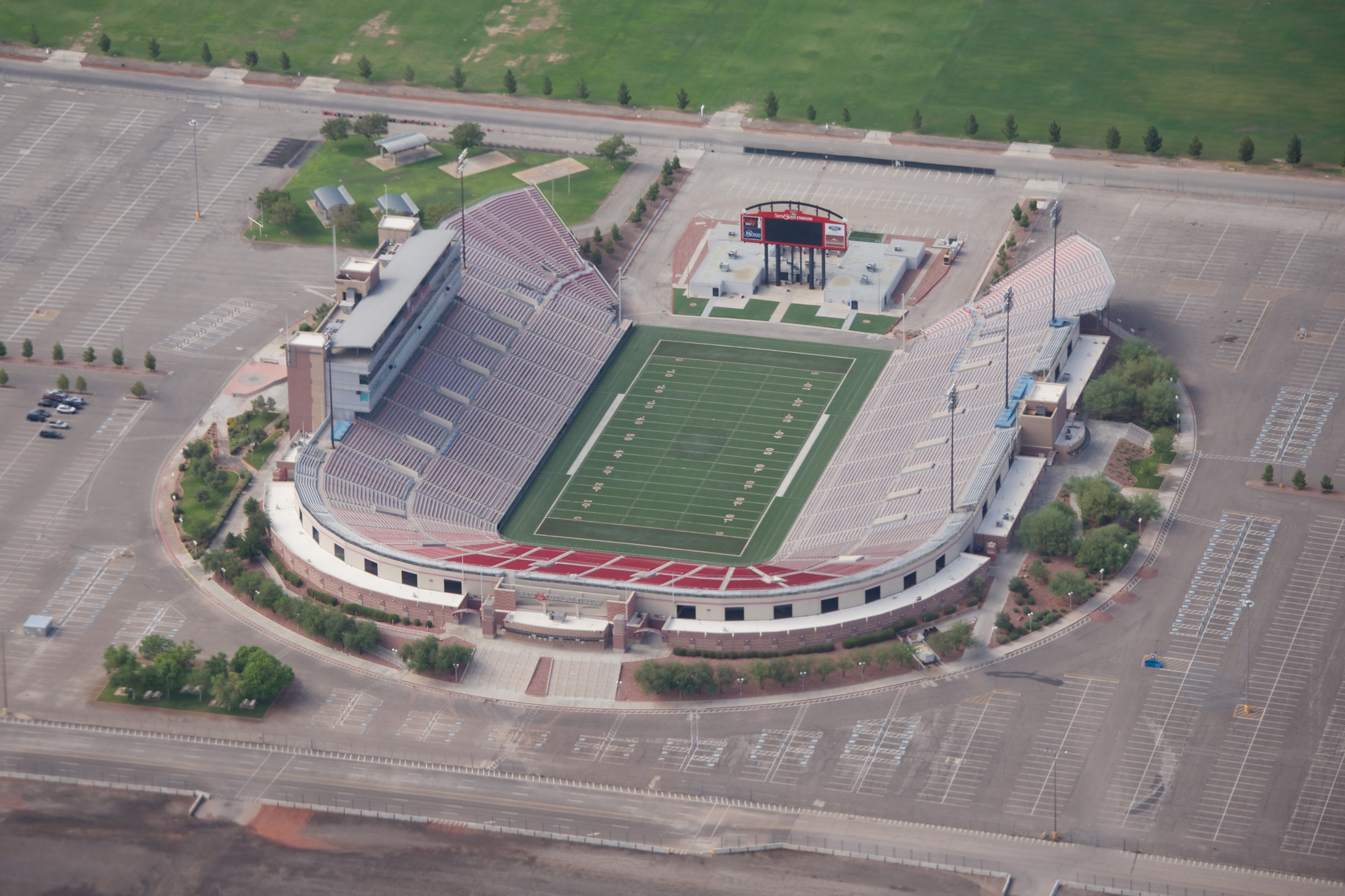
- Sam Boyd Stadium in Whitney, Nevada, hosted the Las Vegas Bowl.
Oregon Ducks	Air Force Falcons
(6–5)	(10–2)
Pac-10	WAC
41	13
Head coach: Mike Bellotti	Head coach: Fisher DeBerry
	AP / Coaches / BA; 23 / 21 / 23
	1	2	3	4	Total
Oregon	13	13	8	7	41
Air Force	0	0	13	0	13
- Date: December 20, 1997
- Season: 1997
- Stadium: Sam Boyd Stadium
- Location: Whitney, Nevada
- Referee: Randy Christal (Big 12)
- Payout: US$800,000 per team

The 1997 Las Vegas Bowl was the sixth edition of the annual college football bowl game, held at Sam Boyd Stadium in Whitney, Nevada on Saturday, December 20, 1997. It featured the Oregon Ducks, and the Air Force Falcons. Despite being decisive underdogs, Oregon soundly defeated the nationally ranked Air Force team.

== Game summary ==
Oregon scored first on a 69-yard touchdown pass from quarterback Akili Smith to wide receiver Pat Johnson for a 7–0 Oregon lead. The big plays continued for Oregon, as running back Saladin McCullough rushed 76 yards for a touchdown, but the extra point attempt failed, and Oregon had a 13–0 lead.

In the second quarter, Oregon blocked an Air Force punt, and Kevin Parker recovered it in the end zone for another Oregon touchdown, but again the extra point failed, and Oregon had a 19–0 lead. Jason Maas threw a 7-yard touchdown pass to Tony Hartley to put the Ducks up 26–0 at halftime.

In the third quarter, Air Force finally got on the scoreboard, with a 1-yard touchdown run from Blane Morgan to make it 26–7. Later in the third quarter, Jason Maas threw a 26-yard touchdown pass to Tony Hartley, and a successful two-point conversion made it 34–7. Air Force scored its final touchdown, on a 45-yard runback of a fumble by Bryce Fisher. The 2-point conversion attempt failed, leaving the score at 34–13. Oregon scored its final points on a 78-yard touchdown pass from Maas to Pat Johnson, making the final score 41–13.
