= 1997 Stanford Cardinal football team =

American college football season

1997 Stanford Cardinal football
- Conference: Pacific-10 Conference
- Record: 5–6 (3–5 Pac-10)
- Head coach: Tyrone Willingham (3rd season)
- Offensive coordinator: Dana Bible (3rd season)
- Offensive scheme: West Coast
- Defensive coordinator: Bill Harris (3rd season)
- Base defense: 4–3
- Home stadium: Stanford Stadium

1997 Pacific-10 Conference football standings
| | Conf. | | | Overall |
| Team | W | | L | W | | L |
|---|---|---|---|---|---|---|
| No. 9 Washington State + | 7 | – | 1 | 10 | – | 2 |
| No. 5 UCLA + | 7 | – | 1 | 10 | – | 2 |
| No. 14 Arizona State | 6 | – | 2 | 9 | – | 3 |
| No. 18 Washington | 5 | – | 3 | 8 | – | 4 |
| Arizona | 4 | – | 4 | 7 | – | 5 |
| USC | 4 | – | 4 | 6 | – | 5 |
| Oregon | 3 | – | 5 | 7 | – | 5 |
| Stanford | 3 | – | 5 | 5 | – | 6 |
| California | 1 | – | 7 | 3 | – | 8 |
| Oregon State | 0 | – | 8 | 3 | – | 8 |
+ – Conference co-champions; Rankings from AP Poll

The 1997 Stanford Cardinal football team represented Stanford University as a member of the Pacific-10 Conference (Pac-10) during 1997 NCAA Division I-A football season. Led by third-year head coach Tyrone Willingham, the Cardinal compiled an overall record of 5–6 with a mark of 3–5 in conference play, tying for seventh place in the Pac-10. The team played home games at Stanford Stadium in Stanford, California.

== Schedule ==
| Date | Time | Opponent | Rank | Site | TV | Result | Attendance | Source |
|---|---|---|---|---|---|---|---|---|
| September 6 | 12:30 p.m. | San Jose State* | No. 17 | Stanford Stadium; Stanford, CA (rivalry) | | W 28–12 | 37,500 | |
| September 13 | 3:00 p.m. | at No. 7 North Carolina* | No. 17 | Kenan Memorial Stadium; Chapel Hill, NC | ESPN2 | L 17–28 | 57,800 | |
| September 20 | 1:00 p.m. | at Oregon State | No. 21 | Parker Stadium; Corvallis, OR | | W 27–24 | 26,244 | |
| September 27 | 7:15 p.m. | Oregon | No. 20 | Stanford Stadium; Stanford, CA (rivalry) | FSN | W 58–49 | 44,721 | |
| October 4 | 12:30 p.m. | Notre Dame* | No. 19 | Stanford Stadium; Stanford, CA (rivalry) | ABC | W 33–15 | 75,651 | |
| October 11 | 7:15 p.m. | at Arizona | No. 16 | Arizona Stadium; Tucson, AZ | FSN | L 22–28 | 40,273 | |
| October 18 | 12:30 p.m. | Arizona State | No. 25 | Stanford Stadium; Stanford, CA | | L 14–31 | 43,909 | |
| November 1 | 3:30 p.m. | No. 12 UCLA | | Stanford Stadium; Stanford, CA (rivalry) | FSN | L 7–27 | 54,332 | |
| November 8 | 12:30 p.m. | at USC | | Los Angeles Memorial Coliseum; Los Angeles, CA (rivalry) | ABC | L 21–45 | 58,900 | |
| November 15 | 2:00 p.m. | at No. 14 Washington State | | Martin Stadium; Pullman, WA | | L 28–38 | 40,306 | |
| November 22 | 12:30 p.m. | California | | Stanford Stadium; Stanford, CA (Big Game) | KGO | W 21–20 | 85,500 | |
*Non-conference game; Rankings from AP Poll released prior to the game; All times are in Pacific time

== Rankings ==
Ranking movements Legend: ██ Increase in ranking ██ Decrease in ranking — = Not ranked
| | Week | | | | | | | | | | | | | | | | | |
| Poll | Pre | 1 | 2 | 3 | 4 | 5 | 6 | 7 | 8 | 9 | 10 | 11 | 12 | 13 | 14 | 15 | 16 | Final |
|---|---|---|---|---|---|---|---|---|---|---|---|---|---|---|---|---|---|---|
| AP | 18 | 18 | 17 | 17 | 21 | 20 | 19 | 16 | 25 | — | — | — | — | — | — | — | — | — |
| Coaches Poll | 18 | | 17 | 18 | 23 | 22 | 21 | 17 | 23 | — | — | — | — | — | — | — | — | — |

== Game summaries ==
=== California ===
California Golden Bears (3–8) at Stanford Cardinal (4–6)

| Quarter | 1 | 2 | 3 | 4 | Total |
|---|---|---|---|---|---|
| California | 0 | 10 | 0 | 10 | 20 |
| Stanford | 7 | 14 | 0 | 0 | 21 |

at Stanford Stadium, Stanford, California

- Date: November 22
- Game attendance: 85,000
- TV: ABC
- Box Score

Game information

First quarter

- STAN – Corey Hill 41-yard interception return (Kevin Miller kick), 2:32. Stanford 7–0.

Second quarter

- STAN – Anthony Bookman 13 yard run (kick failed), 9:34. Stanford 13–0. Drive:
- CAL – Tarik Smith 19-yard run (Tim Wolleck kick), 7:58. Stanford 13–7. Drive: 6 plays, 74 yards.
- STAN – Troy Walters 36-yard pass from Chad Hutchinson (pass good), 4:02. Stanford 21–7. Drive:
- CAL – Ignacio Brache 46-yard field goal, 0:00. Stanford 21–10. Drive:

Third quarter

- No scoring

Fourth quarter

- CAL – Bobby Shaw 12-yard pass from Justin Vedder (pass good), 4:46. Stanford 21–18. Drive: 11 plays, 77 yards.
- CAL – Safety, 0:19. Stanford 21–20.

Top passers

- CAL –
- STAN –

Top rushers

- CAL –
- STAN –

Top receivers

- CAL – Dameane Douglas – 11 receptions, 143 yards
- STAN –

- 100th meeting
- Chris Draft intercepted a Justin Vedder pass at the Stanford 14 with 1:22 left to seal the win.

== Personnel ==
=== Coaching staff ===
- Tyrone Willingham – Head coach
- Dana Bible – Offensive coordinator and quarterbacks
- Earle Mosley – Running backs
- Mose Rison – wide receivers
- Dave Borbely – Offensive line (centers and guards)
- Chuck Moller – Tight ends and offensive line (tackles)
- Bill Harris – Defensive coordinator and defensive backs
- Phil Zacharias – Defensive ends and special teams coordinator
- Kent Baer – Inside and outside linebacker
- Dave Tipton – Recruiting coordinator

=== Roster ===
- LB Chris Draft
- QB Chad Hutchinson
- K Kevin Miller
- WR Troy Walters
- TE Tommy Hanson
- RB Mike Mitchell
