= 1997 Oregon Ducks football team =

American college football season

1997 Oregon Ducks football

Las Vegas Bowl champion

Las Vegas Bowl, W 41–13 vs. Air Force
- Conference: Pacific-10 Conference
- Record: 7–5 (3–5 Pac-10)
- Head coach: Mike Bellotti (3rd season)
- Offensive coordinator: Dirk Koetter (2nd season)
- Offensive scheme: Spread
- Defensive coordinator: Rich Stubler (2nd season)
- Base defense: 4–3
- Captain: Game captains
- Home stadium: Autzen Stadium

1997 Pacific-10 Conference football standings
	Conf.			Overall
Team	W		L	W		L
No. 9 Washington State +	7	–	1	10	–	2
No. 5 UCLA +	7	–	1	10	–	2
No. 14 Arizona State	6	–	2	9	–	3
No. 18 Washington	5	–	3	8	–	4
Arizona	4	–	4	7	–	5
USC	4	–	4	6	–	5
Oregon	3	–	5	7	–	5
Stanford	3	–	5	5	–	6
California	1	–	7	3	–	8
Oregon State	0	–	8	3	–	8
+ – Conference co-champions; Rankings from AP Poll

The 1997 Oregon Ducks football team represented the University of Oregon as a member of the Pacific-10 Conference (Pac-10) during the 1997 NCAA Division I-A football season. Led by third-year head coach Mike Bellotti, the Ducks compiled an overall record of 7–5 with a mark of 3–5 in conference play, tying for seventh place in the Pac-10. Oregon was invited to the Las Vegas Bowl, where the Ducks beat Air Force. The team played home games at Autzen Stadium in Eugene, Oregon.

== Schedule ==
Date	Time	Opponent	Site	TV	Result	Attendance
September 4	7:30 pm	Arizona	Autzen Stadium; Eugene, OR	FSN	W 16–9	38,035
September 13	1:05 pm	at Nevada*	Mackay Stadium; Reno, NV		W 23–20 ^{OT}	30,420
September 20	2:00 pm	Fresno State*	Autzen Stadium; Eugene, OR		W 43–40 ^{OT}	38,288
September 27	7:15 pm	at No. 20 Stanford	Stanford Stadium; Stanford, CA (rivalry)	FSN	L 49–58	44,732
October 4	1:00 pm	No. 15 Washington State	Autzen Stadium; Eugene, OR		L 13–24	43,516
October 11	3:30 pm	No. 18 UCLA	Autzen Stadium; Eugene, OR	FX	L 31–39	42,314
October 18	1:00 pm	Utah*^{†}	Autzen Stadium; Eugene, OR		W 31–13	39,389
October 25	7:15 pm	at USC	Los Angeles Memorial Coliseum; Los Angeles, CA (rivalry)	FSN	L 22–24	53,640
November 8	12:30 pm	at No. 6 Washington	Husky Stadium; Seattle, WA (rivalry)		W 31–28	73,775
November 15	3:30 pm	at No. 15 Arizona State	Sun Devil Stadium; Tempe, AZ	FSN	L 31–52	64,779
November 22	1:00 pm	Oregon State	Autzen Stadium; Eugene, OR (Civil War)		W 48–30	45,735
December 20	3:00 pm	vs. No. 23 Air Force*	Sam Boyd Stadium; Whitney, NV (Las Vegas Bowl)	ESPN2	W 41–13	21,514
*Non-conference game; ^{†}Homecoming; Rankings from AP Poll released prior to the game; All times are in Pacific time
