= Chad Overhauser =

American football player (born 1975)

No. 79
- Position: Tackle

Personal information
- Born: June 17, 1975 (age 51); Sacramento, California, U.S.
- Listed height: 6 ft 6 in (1.98 m)
- Listed weight: 314 lb (142 kg)

Career information
- High school: Rio Americano (Sacramento)
- College: UCLA
- NFL draft: 1998: 7th round, 217th overall pick

Career history
- Chicago Bears (1998–1999); Seattle Seahawks (2000); Atlanta Falcons (2001)*; Houston Texans (2002)
- * Offseason or practice squad member only

Awards and highlights
- Consensus All-American (1997); First-team All-Pac-10 (1997)

Career NFL statistics
- Games played: 3
- Games started: 0
- Stats at Pro Football Reference

Chad Michael Overhauser (born June 17, 1975) is an American former professional football player who was an offensive lineman in the National Football League (NFL). He played college football for the UCLA Bruins, earning consensus All-American honors in 1997. He was selected 217th overall by the Chicago Bears in the seventh round of the 1998 NFL draft.

== See also ==
- 1997 College Football All-America Team
