= 1997 Arizona State Sun Devils football team =

American college football season

1997 Arizona State Sun Devils football

Sun Bowl champion

Sun Bowl, W 17–7 vs. Iowa
- Conference: Pacific-10 Conference

Ranking
- Coaches: No. 14
- AP: No. 14
- Record: 9–3 (6–2 Pac-10)
- Head coach: Bruce Snyder (6th season)
- Offensive coordinator: Dan Cozzetto (6th season)
- Defensive coordinator: Phil Snow (3rd season)
- Home stadium: Sun Devil Stadium

1997 Pacific-10 Conference football standings
	Conf.			Overall
Team	W		L	W		L
No. 9 Washington State +	7	–	1	10	–	2
No. 5 UCLA +	7	–	1	10	–	2
No. 14 Arizona State	6	–	2	9	–	3
No. 18 Washington	5	–	3	8	–	4
Arizona	4	–	4	7	–	5
USC	4	–	4	6	–	5
Oregon	3	–	5	7	–	5
Stanford	3	–	5	5	–	6
California	1	–	7	3	–	8
Oregon State	0	–	8	3	–	8
+ – Conference co-champions; Rankings from AP Poll

The 1997 Arizona State Sun Devils football team represented Arizona State University as a member of the Pacific-10 Conference (Pac-10) during the 1997 NCAA Division I-A football season. In their sixth season under head coach Bruce Snyder, the Sun Devils compiled an overall record of 9–3 with a mark of 6–2 in conference play, placing third in the Pac-10. Arizona State was invited to the Sun Bowl, where they Sun Devils defeated Iowa. The team played home games at Sun Devil Stadium in Tempe, Arizona.

== Schedule ==
Date	Time	Opponent	Rank	Site	TV	Result	Attendance
August 30	7:00 pm	New Mexico State*		Sun Devil Stadium; Tempe, AZ	KTVK	W 41–10	58,607
September 13	12:30 pm	at No. 12 Miami (FL)*	No. 24	Miami Orange Bowl; Miami, FL	CBS	W 23–12	42,219
September 20	7:15 pm	BYU*	No. 14	Sun Devil Stadium; Tempe, AZ	FSN	L 10–13	62,376
September 27	1:00 pm	at Oregon State	No. 25	Parker Stadium; Corvallis, OR		W 13–10	25,873
October 4	3:30 pm	at No. 10 Washington	No. 25	Husky Stadium; Seattle, WA	FSN	L 14–26	74,986
October 11	12:30 pm	USC		Sun Devil Stadium; Tempe, AZ	ABC	W 35–7	61,802
October 18	12:30 pm	at No. 25 Stanford		Stanford Stadium; Stanford, CA		W 31–14	43,909
November 1	8:00 pm	No. 10 Washington State	No. 20	Sun Devil Stadium; Tempe, AZ	FSN	W 44–31	73,644
November 8	4:30 pm	at California	No. 15	California Memorial Stadium; Berkeley, CA	FSN	W 28–21	33,000
November 15	4:30 pm	Oregon^{†}	No. 15	Sun Devil Stadium; Tempe, AZ	FSN	W 52–31	64,779
November 28	4:30 pm	Arizona	No. 12	Sun Devil Stadium; Tempe, AZ (rivalry)	FSN	L 16–28	73,682
December 31	12:30 pm	vs. Iowa*	No. 16	Sun Bowl; El Paso, TX (Sun Bowl)	CBS	W 17–7	49,104
*Non-conference game; ^{†}Homecoming; Rankings from AP Poll released prior to the game; All times are in Mountain time

== Rankings ==
Ranking movements Legend: ██ Increase in ranking ██ Decrease in ranking — = Not ranked
	Week																	
Poll	Pre	1	2	3	4	5	6	7	8	9	10	11	12	13	14	15	16	Final
AP	—	—	—	24	14	25	25	—	—	23	20	15	15	12	12	17	16	14
Coaches	—		—	—	17	23	22	—	—	22	21	16	15	12	12	19	18	14

== Game summaries ==
=== Washington State ===
Washington State at Arizona State

Team	1	2	3	4	Total
No. 10 Cougars	0	7	10	14	31
• No. 20 Sun Devils	7	17	0	20	44

- Date: November 1, 1997
- Location: Sun Devil Stadium
  Tempe, AZ
- Game start: 8:00 pm PDT
- Game attendance: 73,644

Scoring summary
1		ASU	Lenzie Jackson 13-yard pass from Ryan Kealy (Nycz kick)	ASU 7–0
2		ASU	Kenny Mitchell 8-yard pass from Ryan Kealy (Nycz kick)	ASU 14–0
2		ASU	Nycz FG	ASU 17–0
2	7:43	ASU	TD pass from Ryan Kealy (Nycz kick)	ASU 24–0
2		WSU	TD pass from Ryan Leaf (Rian Lindell kick)	ASU 24–7
3		ASU	Rian Lindell 43-yard field goal	ASU 24–10
3	1:17	WSU	DeJuan Gilmore 2-yard run (Rian Lindell kick)	ASU 24–17
4	13:18	WSU	Shawn McWashington 11-yard pass from Ryan Leaf (Ryan Leaf run)	WSU 25–24
4	9:57	ASU	Tariq McDonald 5-yard pass from Ryan Kealy (conversion failed)	ASU 30–25
4	2:55	ASU	Hamilton Mee 66-yard fumble return (Nycz kick)	ASU 37–25
4	2:32	ASU	Derrick Ford fumble recovery in end zone (Nycz kick)	ASU 44–25
4		WSU	TD pass from Ryan Leaf (Rian Lindell kick)	ASU 44–31

After the Sun Devils built a 24–0 lead midway through the second quarter, Washington State rallied to take a 25–24 lead early in the fourth quarter. Arizona State answered with a touchdown, and the Cougars were driving again. However, the Sun Devils forced two fumbles by Ryan Leaf late in the game that were both returned for touchdowns.

=== Vs. Iowa (Sun Bowl) ===
Iowa vs. No. 17 Arizona State

Team	1	2	3	4	Total
Hawkeyes	0	0	0	7	7
• No. 17 Sun Devils	0	10	7	0	17

- Date: December 31
- Location: Sun Bowl Stadium
  El Paso, TX
- Game start: 12:15 PM PST
- Elapsed time: 3:33
- Game attendance: 49,104
- Game weather: 53, Clear and dry, Wind 5-10 MPH
- Referee: Ken Flaherty
- TV announcers (CBS): Tim Ryan, Dave Logan, and Scott Lasky
- Sources: Box score and Game recap

Scoring summary
2	9:41	ASU	L. Jackson 35-yard pass from Campbell (Nycz kick)	ASU 7–0
2	0:00	ASU	Nycz 21-yard field goal	ASU 10–0
3	0:31	ASU	Martin 1-yard run (Nycz kick)	ASU 17–0
4	0:49	Iowa	R. Carter 26-yard pass from Randy Reiners (Zach Bromert kick)	ASU 17–7
