= 1997 All-Pacific-10 Conference football team =

The 1997 All-Pacific-10 Conference football team consists of American football players chosen by various organizations for All-Pacific-10 Conference teams for the 1997 Pacific-10 Conference football season.

== Offensive selections ==
=== Quarterbacks ===
- Ryan Leaf, Washington St. (Coaches-1)
- Cade McNown, UCLA (Coaches-2)

=== Running backs ===
- Skip Hicks, UCLA (Coaches-1)
- Rashaan Shehee, Washington (Coaches-1)
- Michael Black, Washington St. (Coaches-2)
- Saladin McCullough, Oregon (Coaches-2)

=== Wide receivers ===
- Jerome Pathon, Washington (Coaches-1)
- Bobby Shaw, California (Coaches-1)
- Jim McElroy, UCLA (Coaches-2)
- Troy Walters, Stanford (Coaches-2)

=== Tight ends ===
- Cameron Cleeland, Washington (Coaches-1)
- Blake Spence, Oregon (Coaches-2)

=== Offensive linemen ===
- Chad Overhauser, UCLA (Coaches-1)
- Olin Kreutz, Washington (Coaches-1)
- Kyle Murphy, Arizona St. (Coaches-1)
- Grey Ruegamer, Arizona St. (Coaches-1)
- Benji Olson, Washington (Coaches-1)
- Jason McEndoo, Washington St. (Coaches-2)
- Jeremy Newberry, California (Coaches-2)
- Jose Portilla, Arizona (Coaches-2)
- Cory Withrow, Washington St. (Coaches-2)
- Tony Coats, Washington (Coaches-2)

== Defensive selections ==
=== Defensive ends ===
- Jason Chorak, Washington (Coaches-1)
- Kailee Wong, Stanford (Coaches-1)
- Dorian Boose, Washington St. (Coaches-2)
- Inoke Breckterfield, Oregon St. (Coaches-2)

=== Defensive tackles ===
- Joe Salave'a, Arizona (Coaches-1)
- Leon Bender, Washington St. (Coaches-1)
- Jeremy Staat, Arizona St. (Coaches-2)
- Brandon Whiting, California (Coaches-2)

=== Linebackers ===
- Jerry Jensen, Washington (Coaches-1)
- Pat Tillman, Arizona St. (Coaches-1)
- Chris Claiborne, USC (Coaches-1)
- Danjuan Magee, UCLA (Coaches-2)
- Chris Draft, Stanford (Coaches-2)
- Peter Sirmon, Oregon (Coaches-2)

=== Defensive backs ===
- Brian Kelly, USC (Coaches-1)
- Mitchell Freedman, Arizona St. (Coaches-1)
- Chris McAlister, Arizona (Coaches-1)
- Shaun Williams, UCLA (Coaches-1)
- Tony Parrish, Washington (Coaches-2)
- Jason Simmons, Arizona St. (Coaches-2)
- Damien Richardson, Arizona St. (Coaches-2)
- Duane Stewart, Washington St. (Coaches-2)
- Larry Atkins, UCLA (Coaches-2)

== Special teams ==
=== Placekickers ===
- Chris Sailer, UCLA (Coaches-1)
- Robert Nyez, Arizona St. (Coaches-2)

=== Punters ===
- Marcus Williams, Arizona St. (Coaches-1)
- Jeff Banks, Washington St. (Coaches-2)

=== Return specialists/All purpose ===
- Troy Walters, Stanford (Coaches-1)
- Eric Winn, Oregon (Coaches-1)
- J. R. Redmond, Arizona St. (Coaches-1)
- Patrick Johnson, Oregon (Coaches-2)
- Reggie Davis, Washington (Coaches-2)
- R. Jay Soward, USC (Coaches-2)

== Key ==
Coaches = selected by the conference coaches

== See also ==
- 1997 College Football All-America Team
