= Bruce Snyder =

American football player and coach (1940–2009)

Biographical details
- Born: March 14, 1940; Santa Monica, California, U.S.
- Died: April 13, 2009 (aged 69); Phoenix, Arizona, U.S.

Playing career
- 1960–1963: Oregon
- Position: Fullback

Coaching career (HC unless noted)
- 1966–1972: Oregon (assistant)
- 1973: Utah State (assistant)
- 1974–1975: USC (assistant)
- 1976–1982: Utah State
- 1983–1986: Los Angeles Rams (assistant)
- 1987–1991: California
- 1992–2000: Arizona State
- 2003: UNLV (assistant)
- 2004: UNLV (OC)

Head coaching record
- Overall: 125–106–6
- Bowls: 3–3

Accomplishments and honors

Championships
- 2 PCAA (1978–1979); 1 Pac-10 (1996)

Awards
- AFCA Coach of the Year (1996); Eddie Robinson Coach of the Year (1996); George Munger Award (1996); Paul "Bear" Bryant Award (1996); Sporting News College Football COY (1996); Walter Camp Coach of the Year Award (1996); 2× Pac-10 Coach of the Year (1990, 1996)

Bruce Fletcher Snyder (March 14, 1940 – April 13, 2009) was an American football player and coach. After playing college football at the University of Oregon in the early 1960s as a fullback, Snyder embarked on a coaching career. He was the head football coach at Utah State University (1976–1982), University of California, Berkeley (1987–1991), and Arizona State University (1992–2000), compiling a record of 125–106–6 (.540) at the three schools.

Snyder's 58 wins and nine-year tenure as head coach at Arizona State each rank second in school history to marks set by Frank Kush, who coached the Sun Devils from 1958 to 1979 and won 173 games. Snyder led ASU to four bowl games including a win in the 1997 Sun Bowl. More than 40 ASU players coached by Snyder were selected in the National Football League Draft, including seven in the first round, and more than 40 others signed free agent contracts in the National Football League (NFL). After his stint at Arizona State, Snyder assisted long-time friend John Robinson at UNLV for two seasons, in 2003 and 2004. He also served under Robinson as an assistant coach from 1983 to 1986 for the Los Angeles Rams of the National Football League (NFL).

Snyder was twice named Pac-10 Coach of the Year, in 1990 with Cal and in 1996 with Arizona State. He is a member of the Arizona State Hall of Fame. His best Sun Devil team was the 1996 unit. With Jake Plummer at quarterback, Snyder led ASU to an 11–1 record. The Sun Devils stunned the top-ranked and two-time defending national champion Nebraska Cornhuskers in the season's second game. Arizona State reeled off the third undefeated regular season in school history en route 1997 Rose Bowl, where they came within 19 seconds of a victory over Ohio State. Had they won, the Sun Devils would have likely won at least a share of the national championship, as they would have been the only undefeated major-conference team in the nation. For his efforts that season, Snyder won a number of national coaching awards, including the Paul "Bear" Bryant Award and the Walter Camp Coach of the Year Award.

Snyder was diagnosed with Stage IV melanoma in June 2008. He died less than a year later on April 13, 2009, at his home in Phoenix.

== Head coaching record ==
Year	Team	Overall	Conference	Standing	Bowl/playoffs	Coaches^{#}	AP^{°}
Utah State Aggies (Independent) (1976–1977)
1976	Utah State	3–8					
1977	Utah State	4–7					
Utah State Aggies (Pacific Coast Athletic Association) (1978–1982)
1978	Utah State	7–4	4–1	T–1st			
1979	Utah State	8–2–1	4–0–1	1st			
1980	Utah State	6–5	4–1	2nd			
1981	Utah State	5–5–1	4–1	2nd			
1982	Utah State	5–6	2–3	4th			
Utah State:		38–37–2	18–6–1				
California Golden Bears (Pacific-10 Conference) (1987–1991)
1987	California	3–6–2	2–3–2	8th			
1988	California	5–5–1	1–5–1	10th			
1989	California	4–7	2–6	10th			
1990	California	7–4–1	4–3–1	4th	W Copper		
1991	California	10–2	6–2	T–2nd	W Florida Citrus	7	8
California:		29–24–4	15–19–4				
Arizona State Sun Devils (Pacific-10 Conference) (1992–2000)
1992	Arizona State	6–5	4–4	T–6th			
1993	Arizona State	6–5	4–4	T–5th			
1994	Arizona State	3–8	2–6	T–8th			
1995	Arizona State	6–5	4–4	T–5th			
1996	Arizona State	11–1	8–0	1st	L Rose	4	4
1997	Arizona State	9–3	6–2	3rd	W Sun	14	14
1998	Arizona State	5–6	4–4	T–5th			
1999	Arizona State	6–6	5–3	4th	L Aloha		
2000	Arizona State	6–6	3–5	T–5th	L Aloha		
Arizona State:		58–45	40–32				
Total:		125–106–6					
National championship Conference title Conference division title or championship game berth
^{#}Rankings from final Coaches Poll.; ^{°}Rankings from final AP Poll.
