= Henry Foss High School =

School in Washington, United States

Henry Foss High School, an IB World School

Location
- 2112 South Tyler Street; Tacoma, (Pierce County), Washington 98405; United States; 47°14′22″N 122°29′43″W

Information
- Type: Public, Coeducational high school
- Established: 1973
- Status: Open
- School district: Tacoma Public Schools
- CEEB code: 481383
- NCES School ID: 530870001466
- Principal: Lysandra D.M. Ness
- Teaching staff: 580 (2023-2024)
- Grades: 9–12
- Enrollment: 37.00 (FTE)
- Student to teacher ratio: 15.68
- Campus type: Closed
- Colors: Green, Gold & White
- Mascot: Falcon
- Newspaper: Foss Focus
- Yearbook: Calypso
- Website: foss.tacomaschools.org

Henry Foss High School is an American high school in Tacoma, Washington. Named after civic leader and tugboat tycoon Henry Foss, the school first opened in 1973. Foss was the first high school in Washington state to offer the International Baccalaureate (IB) program. It now has the longest-running IB Diploma Program west of the Mississippi in the USA. It is currently a part of the Tacoma Public Schools.

== History ==
In 1982, Foss became the first high school in Washington state to introduce the International Baccalaureate Diploma Program (DP).

In the spring of 2001, the school was selected by the Bill & Melinda Gates Foundation as an Achiever High School in Washington State. The school received a $9 million grant to restructure college preparation efforts, as well as an additional $100 million in scholarships. Among the efforts funded by these grants was a restructuring of the school into smaller "academies", a move unpopular with some faculty and students. In April 2004, a group of Foss sophomores threatened to boycott Washington Assessment of Student Learning (WASL) standardized tests if the school board did not promise to retain pre-IB honors courses in English and history. The principal and school board promised to offer these honor classes in the academies, and the boycott was called off. However, the school ultimately removed the pre-IB classes and replaced them with Honors courses.

In March 2006, the faculty voted by a 60-40 margin not to apply for a renewal of the Gates Foundation grant; those opposed argued that the grant "destroyed good programs" in the school, including the IB Program and the "team teaching" structure. Shortly after, Tacoma Schools Superintendent Jim Shoemaker directed the school's principal to override this decision and apply for a grant extension.

On January 3, 2007, a 17-year-old student, Samnang Kok, was shot in the school's hallway as classes were about to resume after Winter break. The 18-year-old student, Douglas Chanthabouly, was convicted of Kok's murder and was sentenced to 23 years in prison.

On April 30, 2026, a mass stabbing occurred at Henry Foss High School. At least four students and a security guard were injured, four seriously. The suspect, also injured, has been taken into custody. The school was placed on lockdown. The stabbing was sparked by an incident involving a vape battery.

== Traditions ==
=== Foss Family Picnic ===
At the end of the school year, before seniors graduate, ASB organizes the Foss Family Picnic. This day represents the last day that seniors will be on campus.

=== Daffodil Festival ===
Each year, Henry Foss High School participates in the Pierce County Daffodil Festival, a regional tradition since 1933. Each year a competition is held in the fall within the school, for the title of Henry Foss Daffodil Princess. Once selected, the Henry Foss Princess joins other area school representatives in competition for the title of Daffodil Festival Queen.

== Air Force Junior Reserve Officer Training Corps ==
Henry Foss High School has an Air Force Junior Reserve Officer Training Corps program.

== Notable alumni ==
- Lia Bardeen, 1997 graduate, contestant on Top Chef, Season 3
- Dorian Boose, 1992 graduate, 1998-2001 NFL Defensive End
- Brent Goulet, 1983 graduate, professional soccer player, 1988 US Olympic Soccer Team
- Jo Koy, 1989 graduate, stand-up comic, often a panelist on E!'s late night show Chelsea Lately.
- Eduardo Peñalver, 1990 graduate, former Dean of Cornell Law School, now President of Seattle University
