= Antuan Simmons =

American football player (born 1979)

Profile
- Position: Cornerback

Personal information
- Born: March 31, 1979 (age 47); Los Angeles, California, U.S.
- Listed height: 5 ft 9 in (1.75 m)
- Listed weight: 185 lb (84 kg)

Career information
- College: Southern California

Career history
- 2003: Barcelona Dragons
- 2004–2005: Los Angeles Avengers

Awards and highlights
- Second-team All-Pac-10 (1998)

Antuan Simmons (born March 31, 1979) is an American former football cornerback.

== College career ==
Simmons played college football at the University of Southern California. He is famous at USC for intercepting a pass by catching the ball with his legs during a game against UCLA in 2001, returning the interception 34 yards for a touchdown.

Near the end of the 1999 college football season, Simmons suffered a back injury which required him to sit out at the end of the season. While undergoing an MRI on his back in the summer of 2000, a series of tests determined that there were tumors in his chest and near his kidneys. As a result, Simmons spent six weeks in the hospital and underwent three surgeries. Simmons survived a near ordeal with death and lost forty pounds. Yet, through determination, Simmons returned to USC in January 2001 and fully prepared for the 2001 football season. Prior to the 2001 season, Simmons was USC's spokesman at Pac-10 Media Day, and Simmons ended up starting all twelve games at free safety. His interception and touchdown against UCLA are considered a gratifying highlight for Simmons and the 2001 season.

== Professional career ==
Undrafted in 2002, Simmons signed with the San Diego Chargers, but did not survive the final cuts. In 2003, he played for the Barcelona Dragons of NFL Europe and signed with the San Francisco 49ers but again did not make the roster. He played in the Arena Football League (AFL) for the Los Angeles Avengers from 2004 to 2005.

== After football ==
After his playing career ended, he began coaching. In 2026 he is the Varsity Head Football Coach and Defensive Coordinator at Destiny Christian Academy in Sacramento, CA. Some of his prior coaching stops include Laguna Creek High School in Elk Grove, CA, Cosumnes Oaks High School in Elk Grove, CA and Christian Brothers High School in Sacramento, CA.

At Laguna Creek, Simmons helped their then starting running back, Don Jackson to lead the section and division in rushing yards in the 2010 season. Before the end of the season, he was leading the state in yards, and was number 4 in the nation, before Laguna failed to make the playoffs. In 2021 at Christian Brothers, Simmons called the defense under Head Coach Larry Morla, ending up in a CIF SJS Division 3 Championship loss against Grant High School.

Simmons got his revenge win against Grant High School in 2026, beating the Pacers 28-27 on October 16th.
