= Chuck Moller =

American football player and coach (1962–2020)

Biographical details
- Born: January 1962; Eagle Bend, Minnesota, U.S.
- Died: May 25, 2020 (aged 58); Prescott Valley, Arizona, U.S.

Playing career
- 1979–1982: Minnesota–Morris
- Positions: Nose guard, offensive guard

Coaching career (HC unless noted)
- 1984: Minnesota–Morris (GA)
- 1985: Fergus Falls CC (DC)
- 1986–1987: North Dakota State (GA)
- 1988–1989: Pittsburg State (OL/ST)
- 1990–1991: Southwest Texas State (AHC)
- 1992–1996: New Mexico (TE/K)
- 1997–2000: Stanford (OT / TE)
- 2001–2003: Oklahoma State (OL)
- 2011: Minnesota–Crookston
- 2014–2016: San Carlos HS (AZ)
- 2017–present: Bradshaw Mountain HS (AZ)

Head coaching record
- Overall: 1–10 (college)

Chuck Moller (January 1962 – May 25, 2020) was an American football coach and from April 2017 until his death, served as the head football coach at Bradshaw Mountain High School in Prescott Valley, Arizona. Moller’s collegiate head coaching experience consisted of one season (2011) at the University of Minnesota Crookston, where he finished with a record of 1–10.

== Head coaching record ==
=== College ===
Year	Team	Overall	Conference	Standing	Bowl/playoffs
Minnesota–Crookston Golden Eagles (Northern Sun Intercollegiate Conference) (2012)
2011	Minnesota–Crookston	1–10	0–10 / 0–6	14th / 7th (North)	
Minnesota–Crookston:		1–10	0–10		
Total:		1–10			
