= Burkburnett High School =

Location
- 109 West Kramer Road; Burkburnett, Texas 76354; United States; 34.080336°N 98.572749°W

Information
- Type: Public high school
- School district: Burkburnett Independent School District
- Principal: Ann Armendarez
- Staff: 69.05 (FTE)
- Grades: 9-12
- Enrollment: 918 (2023–2024)
- Student to teacher ratio: 13.29
- Colors: Orange and Black
- Athletics conference: UIL Class AAAA
- Mascot: Bulldog
- Yearbook: Balfour
- Website: www.burkburnettisd.org/o/bhs

Burkburnett High School is a public high school located in the city of Burkburnett, Texas, United States, and classified as a 4A school by the UIL. It is a part of the Burkburnett Independent School District located in northern Wichita County. In 2015, the school was rated "met standard" by the Texas Education Agency.

== Academics ==
- Current issues and events champions -
  - 1991(4A)

== Athletics ==
The Burkburnett Bulldogs compete in:

- Archery
- Baseball
- Basketball
- Bass Fishing
- Cheerleading
- Cross country
- Football
- Golf
- Powerlifting
- Soccer
- Softball
- Swim
- Tennis
- Track
- Volleyball

The Burkburnett athletic director and head boys basketball coach, Danny Nix, won his 500th game in February 2019.

=== State finalist ===
- Boys Basketball -
  - 2008(3A), 2011(3A)

== Air Force JROTC ==
Burkburnett High School has an Air Force Junior Reserve Officer's Training Corps unit, established in 2000. Its unit code is TX-20008. It has a drill team (armed and unarmed), color guard, sabre team (Swords), and a physical training team. Cadets who serve 2 years in the program get a rank of E-2 in the U.S. military if they choose to enlist. If a cadet does 3 or more years, then they be ranked E-3 when they enlist in either the U.S. Air Force or the U.S. Navy.
