= Dorian Boose =

American football player (1974–2016)

No. 97, 72, 91
- Position: Defensive end

Personal information
- Born: January 29, 1974; Frankfurt, West Germany
- Died: November 22, 2016 (aged 42); Edmonton, Alberta, Canada
- Listed height: 6 ft 5 in (1.96 m)
- Listed weight: 292 lb (132 kg)

Career information
- High school: Henry Foss (Tacoma, Washington, U.S.)
- College: Walla Walla CC; Washington State
- NFL draft: 1998: 2nd round, 56th overall pick

Career history
- New York Jets (1998–2000); Washington Redskins (2001); Houston Texans (2002)*; Edmonton Eskimos (2003–2004)
- * Offseason or practice squad member only

Awards and highlights
- Grey Cup champion (2003); 2× Second-team All-Pac-10 (1996, 1997)

Career NFL statistics
- Tackles: 33
- Forced fumbles: 2
- Fumble recoveries: 1
- Stats at Pro Football Reference

Dorian Alexander Boose (January 29, 1974 – November 22, 2016) was an American football defensive end in the National Football League (NFL) for the New York Jets and the Washington Redskins. He played college football at Washington State University and was drafted in the second round of the 1998 NFL draft. He played two seasons for the Canadian Football League (CFL) with the Edmonton Eskimos in 2003 and 2004.

Boose committed suicide on November 22, 2016, in Edmonton, Alberta. He was one of at least 345 NFL players to be diagnosed after death with chronic traumatic encephalopathy (CTE), caused by repeated hits to the head.
