= Larry Atkins =

American football player (born 1975)

No. 35, 50, 59
- Position: Linebacker

Personal information
- Born: July 21, 1975 (age 51); Santa Monica, California, U.S.

Career information
- College: UCLA
- NFL draft: 1999: 3rd round, 84th overall pick

Career history
- Kansas City Chiefs (1999–2002); Oakland Raiders (2003)

Awards and highlights
- Third-team All-American (1997); First-team All-Pac-10 (1998); Second-team All-Pac-10 (1997)

Career NFL statistics
- Tackles: 9
- Stats at Pro Football Reference

Larry Tabay Atkins III (born July 21, 1975) is an American former professional football player who was a linebacker in the National Football League (NFL) from 1999 to 2003. He was selected in the third round of the 1999 NFL draft with the 84th overall pick. He attended Venice High School and played college football for the UCLA Bruins. He spent four years with the Kansas City Chiefs and one year with the Oakland Raiders. In his five-year career, Atkins recorded nine tackles, one forced fumble, and one fumble recovery.
