= Chris Sailer =

American football player (born 1977)

Profile
- Position: Kicker

Personal information
- Born: January 9, 1977 (age 49)
- Listed height: 5 ft 10 in (1.78 m)
- Listed weight: 190 lb (86 kg)

Career information
- High school: Notre Dame (Sherman Oaks, California)
- College: UCLA

Career history
- San Francisco 49ers* (1999); Los Angeles Dragons (2000); San Jose SaberCats (2000); Oklahoma Wranglers (2001); Arizona Rattlers (2002–2003, 2005)
- * Offseason or practice squad member only

Awards and highlights
- First-team All-American (1997); First-team All-Pac-10 (1997)
- Stats at ArenaFan.com

Chris Sailer (born January 9, 1977) is an American football trainer of kicking specialists. He works with high school placekickers and punters and evaluates them for college football programs. Sailer was named an All-American as both a kicker and a punter while playing college football for the UCLA Bruins. He played professionally in the Arena Football League (AFL).

== Early life ==
Sailer was born to Elisabeth and Hans Sailer, who had emigrated in 1969 from West Germany to Burbank, California. His parents were soccer fans who knew nothing about football. They exposed him to soccer early, and he excelled as a youth soccer player. Sailer attended high school in Sherman Oaks, Los Angeles, where he was both the kicker and punter at Notre Dame High. As a senior, he set a state single-season record with 22 field goals, making seven from 50 yards of more to help his team win a Division III title. He was named to the USA Today All-USA team, and finished his prep career with a state record 33 career field goals. He also played soccer as a defender.

== College career ==
Sailer decided to attend the University of California, Los Angeles (UCLA), because Bruins football coach Terry Donahue and soccer coach Sigi Schmid allowed him to play both sports, even though the two teams' seasons overlap. His athletic scholarship was rare for a kicker, a position which coaches often filled with walk-ons. He put soccer on hold as a freshman to get acclimated to school while playing football. Later, he decided he could not play both, and chose football.

As a freshman in 1995, Sailer won the job as punter and ranked 15th in the country with a 42.2 yard average. After kicker Bjorn Merten graduated, Sailer assumed the position in 1997, becoming the first Bruin since Frank Corral in 1977 to handle both punts and kicks. That season, Sailer made four field goals in a 39–31 win over Oregon, including a 56-yard kick that stood as a school record until Kaʻimi Fairbairn's 60-yarder in 2015. Sailer finished the season as the runner-up behind Martín Gramática for the Lou Groza Award, given annually to the nation's top college kicker. He was named a first-team All-American kicker by the American Football Coaches Association and the Walter Camp Football Foundation. Additionally, the Football Writers Association of America named Sailer to their first team as a punter. He is the only player in UCLA history to have received first-team All-American honors at two positions in the same season.

In his senior year in 1998, Sailer struggled with his field goals after being bothered for most of the season with a groin injury. He suffered the injury during practice when he did not warm up before participating in a kicking duel with a local sports anchorman.

== Professional career ==
After leaving college, Sailer signed with the San Francisco 49ers in the National Football League (NFL), and played for the Los Angeles Dragons of the Spring Football League and four years in the AFL. While still playing, he also ran organized camps and provided private tutoring to high school kickers and punters. He started Chris Sailer Kicking in 1999, taking financial losses on his camps to build his client base in pursuit of his goal of forming the first national recruiting camp for kicking specialists at the high school level. He held the first national camp in Las Vegas in 2003, when 125 kickers and punters participated in the presence of 30 NCAA Division I Football Bowl Subdivision coaches.

Sailer's kicking camp became the most prominent in the country. He is routinely contacted by college coaches to assist in identifying potential college recruits for their special teams. Players which he identifies as top recruits generally receive scholarships from major football programs. Sailer partnered with former UCLA teammate Chris Rubio, who provides services for long snappers as part of Rubio Long Snapping. Greg Biggins of Scout.com described Chris Sailer Kicking as "pretty much a monopoly". As of 2009, Sailer's camps were drawing an estimate of 450 to 500 kickers, punter, and long snappers. By 2014, thirteen of the 32 starting kickers in the NFL had attended his camp.

Sailer is on the selection committee for the Chris Sailer Award, presented annually to the top high school placekicker in the nation. The award began in 2011 as part of the Herbalife National High School Football Awards.
