= Skip Hicks =

American football player (born 1974)

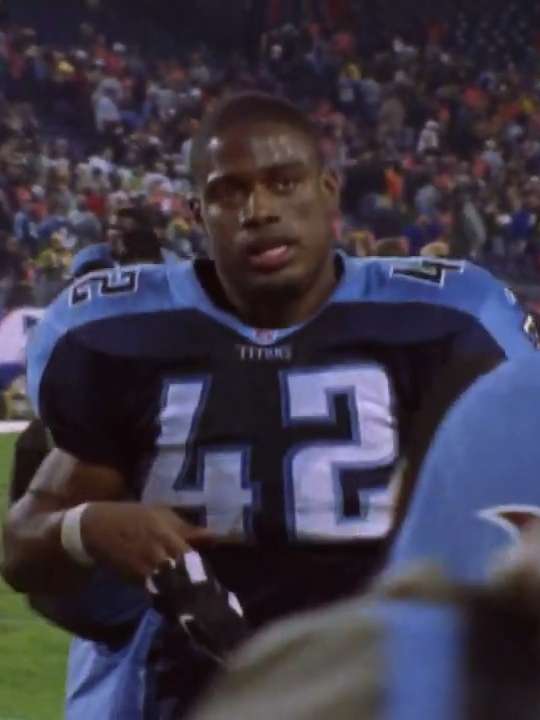
- Hicks with the Tennessee Titans in 2001

No. 20, 42, 34
- Position: Halfback

Personal information
- Born: October 13, 1974 (age 52); Corsicana, Texas, U.S.
- Listed height: 6 ft 0 in (1.83 m)
- Listed weight: 230 lb (104 kg)

Career information
- High school: Burkburnett (Burkburnett, Texas)
- College: UCLA
- NFL draft: 1998: 3rd round, 69th overall pick

Career history
- Washington Redskins (1998–2000); Chicago Bears (2001)*; Tennessee Titans (2001); Carolina Panthers (2002); Cincinnati Bengals (2004)*; Frankfurt Galaxy (2004); Toronto Argonauts (2004)
- * Offseason or practice squad member only

Awards and highlights
- Grey Cup champion (2004); First-team All-American (1997); Pop Warner Trophy (1997); First-team All-Pac-10 (1997); Second-team All-Pac-10 (1996)

Career NFL statistics
- Rushing yards: 1,109
- Rushing average: 3.9
- Touchdowns: 13
- Stats at Pro Football Reference

Brian LaVell "Skip" Hicks (born October 13, 1974) is an American former professional football player who was a running back in the National Football League (NFL). He was selected in the third round of the 1998 NFL Draft. In his four seasons, Hicks played for the Washington Redskins and the Tennessee Titans. He played college football for the UCLA Bruins and still holds school records for touchdowns in a season, with 26 in 1997, and career touchdowns, with 55 (1993–94, 96–97). He graduated from Burkburnett High School in Burkburnett, Texas in 1993.

Hicks also played for the Toronto Argonauts of the Canadian Football League in 2004, appearing in two games. The Argonauts went on to win the 92nd Grey Cup that year, but Hicks was not dressed for that game.

== Post-playing career ==
In 2014, it was announced Hicks would serve as an assistant football coach at Oaks Christian School in California.
