= Brock Huard =

American football player (born 1976)

No. 5, 7, 11
- Position: Quarterback

Personal information
- Born: April 15, 1976 (age 50); Seattle, Washington, U.S.
- Listed height: 6 ft 4 in (1.93 m)
- Listed weight: 232 lb (105 kg)

Career information
- High school: Puyallup (Puyallup, Washington)
- College: Washington (1995–1998)
- NFL draft: 1999: 3rd round, 77th overall pick

Career history

Playing
- Seattle Seahawks (1999–2001); Indianapolis Colts (2002–2003); Seattle Seahawks (2004)

Coaching
- Valor Christian HS (CO) (2025–present) Tight ends coach

Career NFL statistics
- Passing attempts: 107
- Passing completions: 60
- Completion percentage: 56.1%
- TD–INT: 4–2
- Passing yards: 689
- Passer rating: 80.3
- Stats at Pro Football Reference

Brock Anthony Huard (born April 15, 1976) is an American former professional football player who was a quarterback in the National Football League (NFL). He played college football for the Washington Huskies. His older brother Damon also played quarterback at the University of Washington and had a career in the NFL, while his younger brother Luke played at North Carolina and then pursued a football coaching career.

== Early life ==
Huard graduated from Puyallup High School in Puyallup, Washington southeast of Tacoma. His father, Mike Huard, was the head football coach at Puyallup High School. A left-hander, he enjoyed a prodigious prep career and was the Gatorade National Player of the Year, All-State, and Class AAA State Player-of-the-Year in his senior season in 1994. He was named a high school All-American by Parade, a magazine; Super Prep, Blue Chip Illustrated, ESPN, and Schutt (Schutt Sports).

Huard's had very impressive career numbers with the Puyallup HS Vikings completing 237 of 408 passes and passing for 45 touchdowns against only 10 interceptions. Huard also lettered in basketball, averaging 18.1 points and 7.5 rebounds as senior. In addition to his athletic exploits, he graduated from Puyallup High School in 1995 with a 4.0 grade point average.

== College career ==
After his senior season, Huard was one of the most highly recruited players in the country. He narrowed his selections to the University of California Los Angeles and the University of Washington, and made a New Year's Day decision to follow in the footsteps of his older brother Damon and attend the University of Washington in Seattle. The decision was eagerly anticipated by more than just the UW coaching staff and fans; it set off a chain reaction in which quarterback Cade McNown (from West Linn, Oregon) chose UCLA and Westlake Village, California wide receiver Billy Miller decided to go to the University of Southern California in Los Angeles (he had said if Huard chose to attend UCLA he would follow).

After redshirting as a true freshman in 1995, Huard was placed into a competition with Mukilteo's Shane Fortney for the starting quarterback position in the spring. Fortney won the starting job. Huard saw his first career action in the opener of the 1996 season at Arizona State, led by senior quarterback Jake Plummer. Huard entered the sweltering night game with Washington down by 21 points and rallied his team to a 42–42 tie (though ASU won with a late field goal). A week later, Huard played again after Fortney was injured in what seemed like garbage time against BYU. Huard remained as the starting quarterback and led the Huskies (along with a strong offensive line and Pac-10 Offensive Player of the Year running back Corey Dillon) to an 8–1 record the rest of the regular season. While not spectacular in his first year as a starter, Huard showed glimpses of the talent that had made him one of the most highly recruited QBs in the nation two years prior. As a result of internal conflict related to Huard's elevation to the starting position, Fortney transferred to Northern Iowa following the 1996 season.

Washington entered the 1997 season ranked fourth in the AP poll and won the first two games handily (over BYU and San Diego State). In the third game, eventual national champion Nebraska beat Washington 27–14 in Husky Stadium; Huard suffered an ankle injury early in the game, the first downtime in a career that was henceforth injury-riddled. In addition, it forced true freshman Marques Tuiasosopo into action and he had to forego his redshirt season. Huard missed more time in 1997 due to injury and the potential national championship year ended with a disappointing 7–4 regular season, concluding with a 41–35 loss in Husky Stadium in the Apple Cup to Pac-10 champion Washington State. Though Huard was seen as a highly rated prospect for the 1998 NFL draft, he elected to return for his junior year.

Huard's junior season in 1998 began with an improbable win at Arizona State, but it quickly deteriorated with an embarrassing 55–7 loss at Nebraska. Huard went on to set many UW records, but because the Huskies experienced their first non-winning season since 1975, Huard's legacy remains mixed. (Washington finished 6–6 after a 43–25 loss to Air Force in the Oahu Bowl, and head coach Jim Lambright was fired.) Many fans openly called for Huard to be benched in favor of sophomore Tuiasosopo. Still, Huard held school career marks for most passing yards (5,742), touchdown passes (51), 300+ yard games (4), attempts without an interception (151) and ranks second in 200+ games (14) and total yards per game (191.4). He was also named Academic All-American his final two seasons. Huard also earned honorable mention All-Pac-10 honors as sophomore and was a finalist for the Davey O'Brien Award while setting school record with 23 scoring tosses.

Huard maintained a 3.6 GPA as a psychology major. While at Washington, Huard and Molly Hills, a player on the women's basketball team, got engaged. They met while students at the university.

== Professional career ==
Pre-draft measurables
| Height | Weight | 40-yard dash | 10-yard split | 20-yard split | 20-yard shuttle | Three-cone drill | Vertical jump | Broad jump | Wonderlic |
|---|---|---|---|---|---|---|---|---|---|
| 6 ft 4 7/8 in (1.95 m) | 227 lb (103 kg) | 5.16 s | 1.77 s | 2.97 s | 4.44 s | 7.44 s | 30.5 in (0.77 m) | 8 ft 11 in (2.72 m) | 25 |
All values from NFL Combine

=== Seattle Seahawks (first stint) ===
Huard was selected by the Seattle Seahawks in the third round of the 1999 NFL draft, the 77th overall pick and the seventh quarterback. It was the first draft in Seattle for newly hired general manager and head coach Mike Holmgren. Huard's first pass attempt in the NFL (pre-season game) resulted in a touchdown. After a season as third-string in 1999, he saw his first game time in 2000 as the backup to Jon Kitna, starting four games and going 49 of 87 with three touchdowns and two interceptions. Huard played in the first game that season against the Miami Dolphins after Kitna threw four interceptions. He first started in game six, but suffered a concussion two games later against the Oakland Raiders. On his first game back after the injury, he suffered a season-ending kidney injury against the Broncos. In 2000, the Huards became the first set of brothers in NFL history to start at quarterback on the same weekend. On November 26, Damon opened against the Indianapolis Colts as a member of the Miami Dolphins, while Brock started for the Seahawks against the Denver Broncos. In 2001, the Seahawks acquired Matt Hasselbeck and Huard only appeared in one game.

=== Indianapolis Colts ===
Huard was traded to the Indianapolis Colts in 2002, where he was backup to Peyton Manning for two seasons.

=== Seattle Seahawks (second stint) ===
In 2004, Huard signed with the Seattle Seahawks, but spent the entire 2004 season on injured reserve, his last year in professional football. He ended with career NFL stats of 60 of 109 for 689 yards with 4 touchdowns and 2 interceptions.

== Career statistics ==
=== NFL ===
| Year | Team | Games | | | Passing | | | | | | | | | Rushing | | | | | Sacked | |
| Year | Team | GP | GS | Record | Cmp | Att | Pct | Yds | Y/A | Lng | TD | Int | Rtg | Att | Yds | Y/A | Lng | TD | Sck | Yds |
|---|---|---|---|---|---|---|---|---|---|---|---|---|---|---|---|---|---|---|---|---|
| 2000 | SEA | 5 | 4 | 0–4 | 49 | 87 | 56.3 | 540 | 6.2 | 45 | 3 | 2 | 76.8 | 5 | 29 | 5.8 | 10 | 0 | 13 | 72 |
| 2001 | SEA | 1 | 0 | — | 9 | 17 | 52.9 | 127 | 7.5 | 44 | 1 | 0 | 96.9 | 1 | 11 | 11.0 | 11 | 0 | 1 | 5 |
| 2002 | IND | 0 | 0 | — | DNP | | | | | | | | | | | | | | | |
| 2003 | IND | 2 | 0 | — | 2 | 3 | 66.7 | 22 | 7.3 | 13 | 0 | 0 | 88.2 | 3 | 8 | 2.7 | 9 | 0 | 1 | 3 |
| 2004 | SEA | 0 | 0 | — | Did not play due to injury | | | | | | | | | | | | | | | |
| Career | | 8 | 4 | 0–4 | 60 | 107 | 56.1 | 689 | 6.4 | 4 | 3 | 45 | 80.3 | 9 | 48 | 5.3 | 11 | 0 | 15 | 80 |

=== College ===
| Year | Team | Games | | | Passing | | | | | | | | Rushing | | | |
| Year | Team | GP | GS | Record | Cmp | Att | Pct | Yds | Y/A | TD | Int | Rtg | Att | Yds | Avg | TD |
|---|---|---|---|---|---|---|---|---|---|---|---|---|---|---|---|---|
| 1995 | Washington | 0 | 0 | — | Redshirted (redshirt) | | | | | | | | | | | |
| 1996 | Washington | 12 | 9 | 7–2 | 108 | 217 | 49.8 | 1,678 | 7.7 | 13 | 5 | 129.9 | 39 | 12 | 0.3 | 2 |
| 1997 | Washington | 11 | 11 | 8–3 | 106 | 244 | 59.8 | 2,140 | 8.8 | 23 | 10 | 156.4 | 31 | −82 | −2.6 | 1 |
| 1998 | Washington | 10 | 10 | 4–6 | 168 | 315 | 53.3 | 1,924 | 6.1 | 15 | 12 | 112.7 | 44 | 31 | 0.7 | 0 |
| Career | | 33 | 30 | 19–11 | 422 | 776 | 54.4 | 5,742 | 7.4 | 51 | 27 | 131.3 | 114 | −39 | −0.3 | 3 |

== Post-football years ==
In 2019, Huard was named as a color commentator on the No. 2 team for Fox Sports' college football telecasts, joining Joe Davis and later, Jason Benetti for games in the Pac-12, Big Ten, and Big 12. He has been an announcer for ESPN Pop Warner football specials live from Disney's Wide World of Sports. In August 2008, Huard joined ESPN.

He is a co-host on a sports radio talk show KIRO-AM (710 ESPN Seattle), the Brock and Salk show, with co-host Mike Salk. The Brock and Salk radio show on ESPN 710 Seattle moved to podcast only in late September 2019 but returned to weekday morning broadcasts in September 2022. Huard has done color commentary for Fox Sports Networks on their XFL football games and was the color analyst with play-by-play announcer Bob Wischusen for ESPN college football broadcasts, primarily in the SEC and Big Ten. From 2013 to 2022, Huard was the color commentator for Seahawks preseason games with Curt Menefee of Fox Sports doing play-by-play on KCPQ and KZJO (replay).

In 2020, Huard called NFL games for Fox, partnering up with Chris Myers and Greg Jennings from weeks 1–13, and Kevin Kugler from weeks 14–17. Huard is a sideline reporter for Fox telecasts of United Football League games. He began working in the position with the new league's Arlington vs. Birmingham season opener on March 30, 2024, after the XFL and USFL merged in the off-season.

In April 2025, Huard announced on the Real Hawk Talk podcast that he would be the tight ends coach for Valor Christian High School in Highlands Ranch, Colorado, his son's school, under head coach Mike Sanford Jr.

== See also ==
- Washington Huskies football statistical leaders
