= 1997 Arizona Wildcats football team =

American college football season

1997 Arizona Wildcats football

Insight.com Bowl champion

Insight.com Bowl, W 20–14 vs. New Mexico
- Conference: Pacific-10 Conference
- Record: 7–5 (4–4 Pac-10)
- Head coach: Dick Tomey (11th season)
- Offensive coordinator: Homer Smith (2nd season)
- Defensive coordinator: Rich Ellerson (1st season)
- Home stadium: Arizona Stadium

1997 Pacific-10 Conference football standings
	Conf.			Overall
Team	W		L	W		L
No. 9 Washington State +	7	–	1	10	–	2
No. 5 UCLA +	7	–	1	10	–	2
No. 14 Arizona State	6	–	2	9	–	3
No. 18 Washington	5	–	3	8	–	4
Arizona	4	–	4	7	–	5
USC	4	–	4	6	–	5
Oregon	3	–	5	7	–	5
Stanford	3	–	5	5	–	6
California	1	–	7	3	–	8
Oregon State	0	–	8	3	–	8
+ – Conference co-champions; Rankings from AP Poll

The 1997 Arizona Wildcats football team represented the University of Arizona as s member of the Pacific-10 Conference (Pac-10) during the 1997 NCAA Division I-A football season. Led by head coach Dick Tomey in his eleventh season at Arizona, the Wildcats compiled a 7–5 record (4–4 against Pac-10 opponents) and won the Insight Bowl against New Mexico, and old rival of Arizona. Coincidentally, the bowl game was played at the Wildcats' home field, Arizona Stadium. It was the first time that Arizona played a bowl game at their home stadium since 1989, when the Wildcats won the Copper Bowl.

The season was mostly overshadowed by the success of the Wildcats' basketball team after winning the national championship earlier in the year, though the football program rebounded and ended the year on a winning streak and reaching the postseason, which led to playing their bowl game at home.

== Schedule ==
Date	Time	Opponent	Site	TV	Result	Attendance
September 4	7:30 p.m.	at Oregon	Autzen Stadium; Eugene, OR	FSN	L 9–16	38,035
September 13	7:00 p.m.	UAB*	Arizona Stadium; Tucson, AZ	KTTU	W 24–10	36,309
September 20	12:30 p.m.	at No. 9 Ohio State*	Ohio Stadium; Columbus, OH	ABC	L 20–28	91,152
September 27	12:30 p.m.	at No. 24 UCLA	Rose Bowl; Pasadena, CA	FSN	L 27–40	50,188
October 4	7:00 p.m.	San Diego State*	Arizona Stadium; Tucson, AZ	FSN/KTTU	W 31–28	39,195
October 11	7:15 p.m.	No. 16 Stanford	Arizona Stadium; Tucson, AZ	FSN	W 28–22	40,273
October 18	12:30 p.m.	No. 10 Washington	Arizona Stadium; Tucson, AZ	ABC	L 28–58	50,585
October 25	12:30 p.m.	at No. 10 Washington State	Martin Stadium; Pullman, WA	ABC	L 34–35 ^{OT}	31,137
November 8	7:00 p.m.	Oregon State^{†}	Arizona Stadium; Tucson, AZ	FSAZ	W 27–7	39,754
November 15	8:00 p.m.	California	Arizona Stadium; Tucson, AZ	FSN	W 41–38 ^{2OT}	37,111
November 28	4:30 p.m.	at No. 12 Arizona State	Sun Devil Stadium; Tempe, AZ (rivalry)	FSN	W 28–16	73,682
December 27	6:00 p.m.	vs. New Mexico*	Arizona Stadium; Tucson, AZ (Insight.com Bowl, rivalry)	ESPN	W 20–14	49,385
*Non-conference game; ^{†}Homecoming; Rankings from AP Poll released prior to the game; All times are in Mountain time

== Before the season ==
After the Wildcats ended the 1996 season with a loss to Arizona State, the team made changes to the defense. Larry Mac Duff, the Arizona defensive coordinator who had been on Tomey's staff since 1987, left to take an assistant coaching job in the NFL and Tomey had to replace him with a new coordinator to rebuild the Desert Swarm.

During the offseason, Arizona's basketball team captured the national championship and caused the state (mostly in the Tucson area) to fall in love with the sport (like it did in 1988 and 1994 during those teams’ Final Four run), and held a victory parade at Arizona Stadium, though Tomey believed that fans would still support football and that the team would compete in the fall.

== Game summaries ==
=== Oregon ===
Arizona visited Oregon to begin the season. Although they kept the Ducks in check for most of the game, the Wildcats’ offense played poorly but remained in it until the end. Late in the game, Arizona had a chance but came up short and started the season with a loss.

=== Ohio State ===
In their first meeting against Ohio State since 1991, Arizona would play tough with the ninth-ranked Buckeyes. Unfortunately, mistakes would cost the Wildcats as a late rally fell short for another close loss. To date, this remains Arizona's most recent trip to Columbus.

=== San Diego State ===
At home, the Wildcats played San Diego State for the first time since 1979. The Aztecs got off to an early start and led 21–0 at one point before Arizona stormed back to tie it in the second half. After San Diego State retook the lead late in the third quarter, the Wildcats would come back to tie the game again in the fourth and took the lead with over a minute remaining with a field goal. The Aztecs tried to respond on their final drive, but Arizona's defense would cause and interception to complete the comeback win. The 21-point comeback was the largest for the Wildcats in a win under Tomey.

=== Washington State ===
The Wildcats went to Pullman to face tenth-ranked Washington State. Arizona would battle the Cougars back and forth before forcing overtime. In the first overtime period, Washington State scored a touchdown to take the lead. The Wildcats answered back to cut the lead to one. Instead of kicking the extra point to extend the game to a second overtime, Arizona opted to go for two and the win. However, the attempt failed as the Wildcats were stopped short of the goal line, and the Cougars avoided an upset bid by the Wildcats.

It was the second straight season in which Arizona lost a painful overtime game by failing a two-point conversion. Also, the loss caused the Wildcats to be in danger of missing out on a bowl for the third consecutive year.

=== California ===
In their home finale, the Wildcats hosted California. Arizona would lead most of the game before Cal came back to tie in the final minute of regulation and forced overtime. It was the second consecutive year that both the Wildcats and Golden Bears played in overtime.

After both teams scored touchdowns in the first overtime frame, California would miss a field goal in the second which gave Arizona a chance at the win. The Wildcats would convert their field goal try and won their first overtime game in program history and avenged their four-overtime loss to the Bears from the previous season. The win also kept Arizona's bowl chances alive.

=== Arizona State ===
The Wildcats traveled to Arizona State for the “Duel in the Desert” to conclude the regular season. Arizona attempted to get revenge on the Sun Devils after ASU gave them a blowout loss in the previous year. However, things didn't look easy for them as the game took place in Tempe and ASU being ranked 12th and Wildcats needed a win to become bowl-eligible.

In the game, Arizona got off to a good start and led 21–0 before ASU got on the board. Late in the second quarter, the Wildcats scored a touchdown after ASU appeared to jump offsides, which confused both teams as no flag was thrown. The score put Arizona up 28–7 at halftime, which seemed to break the game open. In the second half, Arizona State attempted a comeback, but the Wildcats stopped them short and Arizona got the upset win and avenged their loss to the Devils from the last season. Also, the Wildcats’ win over ASU prevented the Sun Devils from receiving a possible berth in the Fiesta Bowl.

After the game, Tomey said that the team played for pride and were ready to win against their rivals. The victory was the Wildcats’ sixth of the season and made them bowl-eligible.

=== New Mexico (Insight.com Bowl) ===
After beating Arizona State, the Wildcats received an invitation from the Insight Bowl committee, in which they accepted, clinching their first bowl game since 1994.

The bowl game would take place at Arizona's home stadium, which made it more like a home game for the Wildcats despite technically being a neutral-site game. It was Arizona's first bowl at home since 1989 when, they defeated NC State in the Copper Bowl. The opponent for Arizona was New Mexico, who was the secondary rival of the Wildcats from the years that both teams were members of the WAC. Prior to the bowl, both teams announced that the Kit Carson Rifle, the rivalry's trophy, would not be on the line, as the rifle was retired due to allegations of it being used against Native Americans. As the Wildcats possessed the rifle after defeating the Lobos in their previous meeting in 1990, the rifle would be displayed in Tucson.

In the bowl game itself in front of a pro-Arizona crowd and national TV audience, both teams played a close first half with the Wildcats leading at the break. Arizona would add to their lead in the third quarter before New Mexico scored to keep the game close. In the fourth quarter, both teams’ defenses would dominate and the Wildcats would ultimately hold on for the victory and ended the season with a record of 7–5.

== Awards and honors ==
- Chris McAlister, CB, First-team All-Pac-10, Consensus All-American

== Season notes ==
- Arizona won a bowl game for the first time since they won the Fiesta Bowl during the 1993 season.
- The Arizona Stadium midfield logo returned to its 1989–95 look this season (“Block ‘A’” with the words “Bear Down” written below it), though with “Bear Down” painted in red letters instead of blue. A special centennial anniversary athletic logo was used during the 1996 season, although that logo would have probably been used for this season instead before Arizona brought back the 1989–95 design.
- When the Wildcats started the season at 3–5, it led to Tomey being on the hot seat. It has been speculated that the aftermath of the Wildcats’ basketball championship (as well as the softball program also winning a title during the summer) caused fans to lose interest in football and Arizona Stadium having lower attendance during games combined with a tough football schedule, all of which may have affected the football team and leading to their poor record at the time. However, in November, the team won out the remainder of the regular season which saved Tomey's job and the fans got interested in the team again.
- Arizona played Oregon to begin the season, which was the first time since 1989 that the Wildcats started the season with their first game against a conference opponent (Arizona played Stanford to begin 1989). The Wildcats would not begin a season against a conference foe until 2020 when they hosted USC in a shortened season due to a major health outbreak.
- This was the first and only time that Arizona played UAB (Alabama-Birmingham).
- Arizona played a two-quarterback system, which lasted until the end of the 1999 season. The system would seem to help the offense during the following season, when the Wildcats would be dominant.
- The Wildcats and California went to overtime for the second year in a row after overtime was introduced in 1996. The Golden Bears won in the previous year and the Wildcats won in this season. Since then, Arizona has not played an overtime game against the same opponent in two consecutive seasons.
- After this season, Arizona did not defeat Stanford and Oregon State at home again until 2009 (Stanford) and 2015 (Oregon State), respectively. They would also not play California at home again until 2004.
- The games against Washington and Stanford were the only two home games for the Wildcats that had an attendance below 40,000 (this does not include the bowl game due to it being considered a neutral-site game despite being played at the team's home field). The rest of Arizona's regular season home games were lower than that number, mainly due to more fans being focused on the basketball team as that program was looking to defend their 1997 championship. The home games’ attendance decreased during November as a result, although the Wildcats won all of them.
- This was Arizona's second and last time that they played a bowl game at their home stadium, unless they play in the Arizona Bowl in the foreseeable future, whenever that bowl involves a Pac-12 team or if Arizona leaves for a new conference, both of which seems unlikely.
- After winning the Insight Bowl over them, the Wildcats would not play New Mexico again until 2007 during the regular season. In 2015, both the Wildcats and Lobos would again meet in a bowl game, which was played at New Mexico's home field in Albuquerque, with the Wildcats winning again, this time in the New Mexico Bowl, in which would be the next time that Arizona beat the Lobos.

== After the season ==
The 1997 season ended successfully for the Wildcats and set the stage for a memorable 1998 season, which would see the offense improve and become high-powered, similar to the 1993 Desert Swarm team that relied on defense.

Offensive coordinator Homer Smith would retire after the season due to health issues and Tomey brought in a new coach to lead the offense for 1998.

Despite a new offensive coordinator, the team's performance in 1998 would lead them into becoming national contenders like they did during the 1992–93 seasons.

== Team players drafted into the NFL ==
Player	Position	Round	Pick	NFL club
Joe Salavea	D Line	4	107	Tennessee Oilers
Jimmy Sprotte	Linebacker	7	205	Tennessee Oilers
Chester Burnett	Linebacker	7	208	Minnesota Vikings
