= 1997 SMU Mustangs football team =

American college football season

1997 SMU Mustangs football
- Conference: Western Athletic Conference
- Mountain Division
- Record: 6–5 (5–3 WAC)
- Head coach: Mike Cavan (1st season)
- Offensive coordinator: Darrell Dickey (1st season)
- Offensive scheme: Pro spread
- Defensive coordinator: Eric Schumann (1st season)
- Base defense: 4–3
- Home stadium: Cotton Bowl

1997 Western Athletic Conference football standings
	Conf.			Overall
Team	W		L	W		L
Mountain Division
New Mexico x	6	–	2	9	–	4
Rice	5	–	3	7	–	4
SMU	5	–	3	6	–	5
Utah	5	–	3	6	–	5
BYU	4	–	4	6	–	5
UTEP	3	–	5	4	–	7
Tulsa	2	–	6	2	–	9
TCU	1	–	7	1	–	10
Pacific Division
No. 17 Colorado State x$	7	–	1	11	–	2
Air Force	6	–	2	10	–	3
Fresno State	5	–	3	6	–	6
Wyoming	4	–	4	7	–	6
San Diego State	4	–	4	5	–	7
San Jose State	4	–	4	4	–	7
UNLV	2	–	6	3	–	8
Hawaii	1	–	7	3	–	9
Championship: Colorado State 41, New Mexico 13
$ – Conference champion; x – Division champion/co-champions; Rankings from AP Poll

The 1997 Western Athletic Conference Mustangs football team represented Southern Methodist University (SMU) as a member of the Mountain Division of the Western Athletic Conference (WAC) during 1997 NCAA Division I-A football season. Led by first-year head coach Mike Cavan, the Mustangs compiled an overall record of 6–5 with a mark of 5–3 in conference play, tying for second place in the WAC's Mountain Division. Ten years after the NCAA's 1987 "death penalty" on SMU football, SMU's 1997 campaign was the program's first winning season since the football program resumed operations in 1989. The Mustangs played their home games at the Cotton Bowl in Dallas.

== Schedule ==
Date	Time	Opponent	Site	TV	Result	Attendance	Source
September 6	6:00 p.m.	at Ole Miss*	Vaught–Hemingway Stadium; Oxford, MS		L 15–23	36,521	
September 13	7:00 p.m.	vs. Arkansas*	Independence Stadium; Shreveport, LA		W 31–9	23,500	
September 20	7:00 p.m.	Navy*	Cotton Bowl; Dallas, TX		L 16–46	20,011	
September 27	2:00 p.m.	No. 23 BYU	Cotton Bowl; Dallas, TX	KSL	L 16–19 ^{OT}	23,701	
October 4	7:05 p.m.	at New Mexico	University Stadium; Albuquerque, NM		L 15–22	33,128	
October 11	2:05 p.m.	at Utah	Robert Rice Stadium; Salt Lake City, UT		W 20–19	26,611	
October 25	2:00 p.m.	Wyoming	Cotton Bowl; Dallas, TX		W 22–17	22,403	
November 1	2:00 p.m.	Rice	Cotton Bowl; Dallas, TX (rivalry)		W 24–6	20,024	
November 8	2:00 p.m.	UTEP^{†}	Cotton Bowl; Dallas, TX		W 28–14	21,280	
November 15	1:30 p.m.	at Tulsa	Skelly Stadium; Tulsa, OK		W 42–41	15,234	
November 20	7:05 p.m.	at TCU	Amon G. Carter Stadium; Fort Worth, TX (rivalry)	ESPN	L 18–21	19,094	
*Non-conference game; ^{†}Homecoming; Rankings from AP Poll released prior to the game; All times are in Central time

== Personnel ==
=== Coaching staff ===
Mike Cavan succeeded Tom Rossley as SMU head coach. Rossley coached SMU from 1991 to 1996 and left with a 15–48–3 record. Cavan became SMU's third head coach in the post-"death penalty" era for SMU. Cavan, a former starting quarterback for the Georgia Bulldogs, was previously head coach at Valdosta State from 1986 to 1991 and East Tennessee State from 1992 to 1996. This is Cavan's first head coaching job at a Division I-A school.

Name	Position	Seasons at SMU	Alma mater
Mike Cavan	Head coach	1	Georgia (1972)
Warren Belin	Linebackers	1	Wake Forest (1990)
Darrell Dickey	Offensive coordinator, quarterbacks	1	Kansas State (1984)
Derek Dooley	Wide receivers	1	Virginia (1991)
Troy Douglas	Running backs	1	Appalachian State (1988)
Steve Malin	Defensive ends	4	East Texas State (1993)
David McKnight	Tight ends	1	Georgia (1969)
Eric Schumann	Defensive coordinator, defensive backs	1	Alabama (1977)
Randy Williams	Offensive line	1	Valdosta State (1991)

=== Roster ===
1997 SMU Mustangs football team roster
Players
Coaches
Offense

Pos.	#	Name	Class
C	70	Austin Adami	Jr
RB	21	Kelsey Adams	Jr
WR	5	Albert Johnson	Jr
RB	46	Jeff Pennington	So
RB	28	Rodnick Phillips	So
QB	12	Chris Sanders	So

Defense

Pos.	#	Name	Class
LB	42	Chris Bordano	Sr
DB	25	Chris Campbell	Sr
LB	97	Jon Wilson	Sr

Special teams

Pos.	#	Name	Class

Head coach

- Mike Cavan

Coordinators/assistant coaches

Legend

- (C) Team captain
- (S) Suspended
- (I) Ineligible
- Injured
- Redshirt

== After the season ==
=== Coaching changes ===
Offensive coordinator Darrell Dickey left SMU to take the head coaching job at North Texas in 1998; Greg Briner, previously the quarterbacks and wide receivers coach at Georgia, succeeded Dickey as offensive coordinator. Offensive line graduate assistant Paul Etheridge was promoted to tight ends and offensive tackles David McKnight moved to running backs coach.

=== NFL draft ===
In the 1998 NFL draft, linebacker Chris Bordano was selected by the New Orleans Saints in the sixth round and 161st overall.
