= 1997 San Jose State Spartans football team =

American college football season

1997 San Jose State Spartans football
- Conference: Western Athletic Conference
- Pacific Division
- Record: 4–7 (4–4 WAC)
- Head coach: Dave Baldwin (1st season)
- Defensive coordinator: Ron Ponciano (1st season)
- Home stadium: Spartan Stadium

1997 Western Athletic Conference football standings
	Conf.			Overall
Team	W		L	W		L
Mountain Division
New Mexico x	6	–	2	9	–	4
Rice	5	–	3	7	–	4
SMU	5	–	3	6	–	5
Utah	5	–	3	6	–	5
BYU	4	–	4	6	–	5
UTEP	3	–	5	4	–	7
Tulsa	2	–	6	2	–	9
TCU	1	–	7	1	–	10
Pacific Division
No. 17 Colorado State x$	7	–	1	11	–	2
Air Force	6	–	2	10	–	3
Fresno State	5	–	3	6	–	6
Wyoming	4	–	4	7	–	6
San Diego State	4	–	4	5	–	7
San Jose State	4	–	4	4	–	7
UNLV	2	–	6	3	–	8
Hawaii	1	–	7	3	–	9
Championship: Colorado State 41, New Mexico 13
$ – Conference champion; x – Division champion/co-champions; Rankings from AP Poll

The 1997 San Jose State Spartans football team represented San Jose State University during the 1997 NCAA Division I-A football season as a member of the Western Athletic Conference. The team was led by head coach Dave Baldwin, in his first year as head coach at San Jose State. They played home games at Spartan Stadium in San Jose, California. The Spartans finished the 1997 season with a record of four wins and seven losses (4–7, 4–4 WAC).

== Schedule ==
Date	Opponent	Site	TV	Result	Attendance	Source
September 6	at No. 17 Stanford*	Stanford Stadium; Stanford, CA (rivalry)		L 12–28	37,500	
September 13	Wisconsin*	Spartan Stadium; San Jose, CA		L 10–56	23,042	
September 20	at Wyoming	War Memorial Stadium; Laramie, WY		L 10–30		
October 4	at Oregon State*	Parker Stadium; Corvallis, OR		L 12–26	19,168	
October 11	Colorado State	Spartan Stadium; San Jose, CA		L 20–55	10,384	
October 18	at UTEP	Sun Bowl; El Paso, TX		W 10–7	25,908	
October 25	Air Force	Spartan Stadium; San Jose, CA	ESPN2	W 25–22	14,672	
November 1	Fresno State^{†}	Spartan Stadium; San Jose, CA (rivalry)		L 12–53	18,753	
November 8	at San Diego State	Jack Murphy Stadium; San Diego, CA		L 21–48	29,869	
November 15	Hawaii	Spartan Stadium; San Jose, CA (rivalry)		W 38–17	9,437	
November 22	at UNLV	Sam Boyd Stadium; Whitney, NV		W 55–48 ^{OT}	15,141	
*Non-conference game; ^{†}Homecoming; Rankings from AP Poll released prior to the game

== Game summaries ==
=== At No. 17 Stanford ===
	1	2	3	4	Total
Spartans					0
No. 17 Cardinal					0

=== Wisconsin ===
	1	2	3	4	Total
Badgers	14	28	14	0	56
Spartans	10	0	0	0	10

=== At Wyoming ===
	1	2	3	4	Total
Spartans					0
Cowboys					0

=== At Oregon State ===
	1	2	3	4	Total
Spartans					0
Beavers					0

=== Colorado State ===
	1	2	3	4	Total
Rams					0
Spartans					0

=== At UTEP ===
	1	2	3	4	Total
Spartans					0
Miners					0

=== Air Force ===
	1	2	3	4	Total
Falcons					0
Spartans					0

=== Fresno State ===
	1	2	3	4	Total
Bulldogs					0
Spartans					0

=== At San Diego State ===
	1	2	3	4	Total
Spartans					0
Aztecs					0

=== Hawaii ===
	1	2	3	4	Total
Rainbow Warriors					0
Spartans					0

=== At UNLV ===
	1	2	3	4	Total
Spartans					0
Rebels					0
