= 1997 Utah Utes football team =

American college football season

1997 Utah Utes football
- Conference: Western Athletic Conference
- Mountain Division
- Record: 6–5 (5–3 WAC)
- Head coach: Ron McBride (8th season)
- Offensive coordinator: Fred Graves (3rd season)
- Offensive scheme: Pro-style
- Defensive coordinator: Kyle Whittingham (3rd season)
- Base defense: 4–3
- Home stadium: Robert Rice Stadium

1997 Western Athletic Conference football standings
	Conf.			Overall
Team	W		L	W		L
Mountain Division
New Mexico x	6	–	2	9	–	4
Rice	5	–	3	7	–	4
SMU	5	–	3	6	–	5
Utah	5	–	3	6	–	5
BYU	4	–	4	6	–	5
UTEP	3	–	5	4	–	7
Tulsa	2	–	6	2	–	9
TCU	1	–	7	1	–	10
Pacific Division
No. 17 Colorado State x$	7	–	1	11	–	2
Air Force	6	–	2	10	–	3
Fresno State	5	–	3	6	–	6
Wyoming	4	–	4	7	–	6
San Diego State	4	–	4	5	–	7
San Jose State	4	–	4	4	–	7
UNLV	2	–	6	3	–	8
Hawaii	1	–	7	3	–	9
Championship: Colorado State 41, New Mexico 13
$ – Conference champion; x – Division champion/co-champions; Rankings from AP Poll

The 1997 Utah Utes football team represented the University of Utah as a member of the Mountain Division of the Western Athletic Conference (WAC) during the 1997 NCAA Division I-A football season. Led by eighth-year head coach Ron McBride, the Utes compiled an overall record of 6–5 with a mark of 5–3 in conference play, placing in a three-way tie for second in the WAC's Mountain Division. Utah played home games at Robert Rice Stadium in Salt Lake City. Immediately after the final home game, the stadium was torn down and rebuilt into the new Rice–Eccles Stadium, partly in anticipation of the upcoming 2002 Winter Olympics.

== Schedule ==
Date	Time	Opponent	Site	TV	Result	Attendance
August 30	7:00 pm	Utah State*	Robert Rice Stadium; Salt Lake City, UT (Battle of the Brothers)		L 14–21	33,804
September 6	1:00 pm	at Louisville*	Cardinal Stadium; Louisville, KY	KJZZ	W 27–21	35,437
September 13	7:05 pm	at TCU	Amon G. Carter Stadium; Fort Worth, TX		W 32–18	25,382
September 20	7:00 pm	UTEP	Rice Stadium; Salt Lake City, UT		W 56–3	28,820
October 2	6:00 pm	at Fresno State	Bulldog Stadium; Fresno, CA	ESPN	L 13–27	37,994
October 11	1:00 pm	SMU	Rice Stadium; Salt Lake City, UT		L 19–20	26,611
October 18	2:00 pm	at Oregon*	Autzen Stadium; Eugene, OR		L 13–31	39,389
October 25	1:00 pm	New Mexico^{†}	Rice Stadium; Salt Lake City, UT		W 15–10	28,129
November 1	1:00 pm	at Tulsa	Skelly Stadium; Tulsa, OK		L 13–21	19,864
November 15	1:00 pm	Rice	Rice Stadium; Salt Lake City, UT		W 31–14	27,049
November 22	1:30 pm	at BYU	Cougar Stadium; Provo, UT (Holy War)	ABC	W 20–14	65,868
*Non-conference game; ^{†}Homecoming; All times are in Mountain time

== Game summaries ==
=== BYU ===
Team	1	2	3	4	Total
• Utah	10	0	0	10	20
BYU	7	7	0	0	14

- Date: November 22
- Location: Cougar Stadium, Provo, UT
- Game start: 1:30 PM MST

Scoring summary
1	11:16	UTAH	Tommy Truhe 27-yard field goal	UTAH 3–0
1	3:33	UTAH	Darnell Arceneaux 4-yard run (Tommy Truhe kick)	UTAH 10–0
1	1:19	BYU	Brian McKenzie 1-yard run (Owen Pochman kick)	UTAH 10–7
2	12:11	BYU	Brian McKenzie 16-yard run (Owen Pochman kick)	BYU 14–10
4	14:56	UTAH	Darnell Arceneaux 8-yard run (Tommy Truhe kick)	UTAH 17–14
4	1:39	UTAH	Tommy Truhe 33-yard field goal	UTAH 20–14

== NFL draft ==
Two players went in the 1998 NFL draft, including one in the first round (Kevin Dyson).

Player	Position	Round	Pick	NFL club
Kevin Dyson	Wide receiver	1	16	Tennessee Oilers
Chris Fuamatu-Ma'afala	Fullback	6	178	Pittsburgh Steelers
