= 1997 WAC Championship Game =

- 2nd WAC Championship Game
New Mexico Lobos	Colorado State Rams
(9–2)	(9–2)
13	41
Head coach: Dennis Franchione	Head coach: Sonny Lubick
AP / Coaches; RV / 25	AP / Coaches; 20 / 18
	1	2	3	4	Total
New Mexico	3	7	3	0	13
Colorado State	0	10	7	24	41
- Date: December 6, 1997
- Season: 1997
- Stadium: Sam Boyd Stadium
- Location: Whitney, Nevada
- Attendance: 12,706

United States TV coverage
- Network: ABC

1997 Western Athletic Conference football standings
	Conf.			Overall
Team	W		L	W		L
Mountain Division
New Mexico x	6	–	2	9	–	4
Rice	5	–	3	7	–	4
SMU	5	–	3	6	–	5
Utah	5	–	3	6	–	5
BYU	4	–	4	6	–	5
UTEP	3	–	5	4	–	7
Tulsa	2	–	6	2	–	9
TCU	1	–	7	1	–	10
Pacific Division
No. 17 Colorado State x$	7	–	1	11	–	2
Air Force	6	–	2	10	–	3
Fresno State	5	–	3	6	–	6
Wyoming	4	–	4	7	–	6
San Diego State	4	–	4	5	–	7
San Jose State	4	–	4	4	–	7
UNLV	2	–	6	3	–	8
Hawaii	1	–	7	3	–	9
Championship: Colorado State 41, New Mexico 13
$ – Conference champion; x – Division champion/co-champions; Rankings from AP Poll

The 1997 WAC Championship Game was a college football game played on Saturday, December 6, 1997, at Sam Boyd Stadium in Whitney, Nevada. This was the 2nd and penultimate WAC Championship Game and determined the 1997 champion of the Western Athletic Conference. The game featured the New Mexico Lobos, champions of the Mountain division, and the Colorado State Rams, champions of the Pacific division. Colorado State would win the game 41–13.

== Game summary ==
1997 WAC Championship Game

Quarter	1	2	3	4	Total
New Mexico	3	7	3	0	13
No. 20 Colorado State	0	10	7	24	41

at Sam Boyd Stadium • Whitney, Nevada

- Date: December 6, 1997
- Game attendance: 12,706
- TV: ABC
- WAC game summary

Game information

First quarter

- (4:40) UNM – Colby Cason 37 yard field goal (UNM 3-0)

Second quarter

- (12:43) CSU – Derek Franz 47 yard field goal (Tied 3–3)
- (8:01) UNM – Reginal Johnson 7 yard run, Colby Cason kick (UNM 10–3)
- (3:44) CSU – Damon Washington 51 yard run, Derek Franz kick (Tied 10–10)

Third quarter

- (11:02) CSU – Kevin McDougal 44 yard run, Derek Franz kick (CSU 17–10)
- (8:22) UNM – Colby Cason 36 yard field goal (CSU 17–13)

Fourth quarter

- (9:11) CSU – Derek Franz 26 yard field goal (CSU 20–13)
- (8:01) CSU – Kevin McDougal 42 yard run, Derek Franz kick (CSU 27–13)
- (3:32) CSU – Derrek Uhl 19 yard pass from Jaime Blake, Derek Franz kick (CSU 34–13)
- (1:48) CSU – Kevin McDougal 66 yard run, Derek Franz kick (CSU 41–13)

=== Statistics ===
Statistics	UNM	CSU
First downs		
Plays–yards		
Rushes–yards		
Passing yards		
Passing: comp–att–int		
Time of possession		

Team	Category	Player	Statistics
New Mexico	Passing	Graham Leigh	17–27, 172 yds, 1 INT
New Mexico	Rushing	Eric Jaworsky	9 car, 104 yds
New Mexico	Receiving	Pascal Volz	4 rec, 53 yds
Colorado State	Passing	Moses Moreno	9–20, 92 yds, 3 INT
Colorado State	Rushing	Kevin McDougal	20 car, 255 yds, 3 TD
Colorado State	Receiving	Eli Workman	3 rec, 29 yds
