= 1997 UNLV Rebels football team =

American college football season

1997 UNLV Rebels football
- Conference: Western Athletic Conference
- Pacific Division
- Record: 3–8 (2–6 WAC)
- Head coach: Jeff Horton (4th season)
- Offensive coordinator: Charlie Stubbs (2nd season)
- Defensive coordinator: Ruffin McNeill (1st season)
- Home stadium: Sam Boyd Stadium

1997 Western Athletic Conference football standings
	Conf.			Overall
Team	W		L	W		L
Mountain Division
New Mexico x	6	–	2	9	–	4
Rice	5	–	3	7	–	4
SMU	5	–	3	6	–	5
Utah	5	–	3	6	–	5
BYU	4	–	4	6	–	5
UTEP	3	–	5	4	–	7
Tulsa	2	–	6	2	–	9
TCU	1	–	7	1	–	10
Pacific Division
No. 17 Colorado State x$	7	–	1	11	–	2
Air Force	6	–	2	10	–	3
Fresno State	5	–	3	6	–	6
Wyoming	4	–	4	7	–	6
San Diego State	4	–	4	5	–	7
San Jose State	4	–	4	4	–	7
UNLV	2	–	6	3	–	8
Hawaii	1	–	7	3	–	9
Championship: Colorado State 41, New Mexico 13
$ – Conference champion; x – Division champion/co-champions; Rankings from AP Poll

The 1997 UNLV Rebels football team was an American football team that represented the University of Nevada, Las Vegas (UNLV) as a member of the Western Athletic Conference (WAC) during the 1997 NCAA Division I-A football season. In their fourth year under head coach Jeff Horton, the Rebels compiled an overall record of 3–8 record with mark of 2–6 in conference play, placing seventh in the WAC's Pacific Division. The team played home games at Sam Boyd Stadium in Whitney, Nevada.

== Schedule ==
Date	Opponent	Site	Result	Attendance	Source
September 6	at Nevada*	Mackay Stadium; Reno, NV (Fremont Cannon)	L 14–31	30,118	
September 13	at Air Force	Falcon Stadium; Colorado Springs, CO	L 24–25	39,027	
September 20	Hawaii	Sam Boyd Stadium; Whitney, NV	W 25–15	27,117	
September 27	Illinois State*	Sam Boyd Stadium; Whitney, NV	W 41–6	20,556	
October 4	at USC*	Los Angeles Memorial Coliseum; Los Angeles, CA	L 21–35	48,404	
October 11	TCU	Sam Boyd Stadium; Whitney, NV	W 21–19	18,777	
October 18	at San Diego State	Jack Murphy Stadium; San Diego, CA	L 17–20 ^{OT}	24,628	
October 25	at Fresno State	Bulldog Stadium; Fresno, CA	L 28–46	38,002	
November 1	Colorado State	Sam Boyd Stadium; Whitney, NV	L 19–45	19,654	
November 8	at Wyoming	War Memorial Stadium; Laramie, WY	L 23–35	11,654	
November 22	San Jose State	Sam Boyd Stadium; Whitney, NV	L 48–55 ^{OT}	15,141	
*Non-conference game
