= 1997 Washington Huskies football team =

American college football season

1997 Washington Huskies football

Aloha Bowl champion

Aloha Bowl, W 51–23 vs. Michigan State
- Conference: Pacific-10 Conference

Ranking
- Coaches: No. 18
- AP: No. 18
- Record: 8–4 (5–3 Pac-10)
- Head coach: Jim Lambright (5th season)
- Offensive coordinator: Scott Linehan (2nd season)
- Defensive coordinator: Randy Hart (3rd season)
- MVP: Jerome Pathon
- Captains: Jerry Jensen; Rashaan Shehee; Jerome Pathon; Tony Parrish
- Home stadium: Husky Stadium

1997 Pacific-10 Conference football standings
	Conf.			Overall
Team	W		L	W		L
No. 9 Washington State +	7	–	1	10	–	2
No. 5 UCLA +	7	–	1	10	–	2
No. 14 Arizona State	6	–	2	9	–	3
No. 18 Washington	5	–	3	8	–	4
Arizona	4	–	4	7	–	5
USC	4	–	4	6	–	5
Oregon	3	–	5	7	–	5
Stanford	3	–	5	5	–	6
California	1	–	7	3	–	8
Oregon State	0	–	8	3	–	8
+ – Conference co-champions; Rankings from AP Poll

The 1997 Washington Huskies football team was an American football team that represented the University of Washington during the 1997 NCAA Division I-A football season. In its fifth season under head coach Jim Lambright, the team compiled an 8–4 record, finished fourth in the Pacific-10 Conference, and outscored opponents 420 to 259. Receiver Jerome Pathon was selected as the team's most valuable player. Seniors Pathon, Jerry Jensen, Rashaan Shehee, Tony Parrish were the team captains.

After a 27–0 shutout of USC on November 1, the Huskies were 7–1 and ranked sixth in the nation. Saddled with injuries, they lost the final three conference games to unranked Oregon, #9 UCLA, and #11 Washington State.

At the Aloha Bowl on Christmas Day against #25 Michigan State, Washington built a 31–10 lead at halftime and won 51–23; it was Lambright's sole bowl victory in his six seasons as head coach. The win moved UW up three spots in the final rankings, to #18 in both major polls.

== Schedule ==
Date	Time	Opponent	Rank	Site	TV	Result	Attendance
September 6	12:30 p.m.	at No. 19 BYU*	No. 4	Cougar Stadium; Provo, UT	FSN	W 42–20	65,978
September 13	12:30 p.m.	San Diego State*	No. 3	Husky Stadium; Seattle, WA	FSN	W 36–3	71,081
September 20	12:30 p.m.	No. 7 Nebraska*	No. 2	Husky Stadium; Seattle, WA	ABC	L 14–27	74,023
October 4	3:30 p.m.	No. 25 Arizona State	No. 10	Husky Stadium; Seattle, WA	FSN	W 26–14	74,986
October 11	12:30 p.m.	at California	No. 10	California Memorial Stadium; Berkeley, CA		W 30–3	48,000
October 18	12:30 p.m.	at Arizona	No. 10	Arizona Stadium; Tucson, AZ	ABC	W 58–28	50,585
October 25	3:30 p.m.	at Oregon State	No. 7	Parker Stadium; Corvallis, OR	FSN	W 45–17	28,067
November 1	12:30 p.m.	USC	No. 7	Husky Stadium; Seattle, WA	ABC	W 27–0	73,401
November 8	12:30 p.m.	Oregon	No. 6	Husky Stadium; Seattle, WA (rivalry)		L 28–31	73,775
November 15	12:30 p.m.	at No. 9 UCLA	No. 13	Rose Bowl; Pasadena, CA	ABC	L 28–52	85,697
November 22	12:30 p.m.	No. 11 Washington State	No. 17	Husky Stadium; Seattle, WA (Apple Cup)	ABC	L 35–41	74,268
December 25	12:30 p.m.	vs. No. 25 Michigan State*	No. 21	Aloha Stadium; Halawa, HI (Aloha Bowl)	ABC	W 51–23	34,419
*Non-conference game; Rankings from AP Poll released prior to the game; All times are in Pacific time

== Rankings ==
Ranking movements Legend: ██ Increase in ranking ██ Decrease in ranking ( ) = First-place votes
	Week																	
Poll	Pre	1	2	3	4	5	6	7	8	9	10	11	12	13	14	15	16	Final
AP	4 (10)	4 (9)	4 (9)	3 (14)	2 (19)	10	10	10	10	7	7	6	13	17	21	21	21	18
Coaches	3 (15)		4 (7)	3 (13)	3 (12)	11	11	9	8	7	7	6	14	20	22	22	23	18

== Roster ==
1997 Washington Huskies football team roster
Players
Coaches
Offense

Pos.	#	Name	Class
TE	88	Jeremy Brigham	Sr
TE	85	Cameron Cleeland	Sr
OT	67	Tony Coats	Jr
WR	22	Fred Coleman	Sr
FB	47	Pat Conniff	Fr
OT	75	Aaron Dalan	Jr
WR	3	Andre DeSaussure	Jr
RB	18	Jason Harris	Jr
WR	4	Ja'Warren Hooker	Fr
QB	7	Brock Huard	So
G	70	Ben Kadletz	Jr
FB	25	George Keiaho	Jr
C	77	Olin Kreutz	Jr
G	75	Benji Olson	Jr
WR	24	Jerome Pathon (C)	Sr
FB	36	Mike Reed	Jr
RB	32	Maurice Shaw	So
RB	1	Rashaan Shehee (C)	Sr
QB	11	Marques Tuiasosopo	Fr
G	71	Chad Ward	Fr

Defense

Pos.	#	Name	Class
ROV	8	Nigel Burton	Jr
CB	10	Toure Butler	Fr
DE	35	Cris Campbell	Sr
DE	46	Jason Chorak	Sr
CB	15	Javon Daniels	So
LB	27	Marques Hairston	So
DT	95	Jabari Issa	So
LB	40	Jerry Jensen (C)	Sr
CB	25	Mel Miller	So
FS	7	Tony Parrish (C)	Sr
LB	4	Jeremiah Pharms	Fr
CB	1	Jermaine Smith	So
LB	17	Lester Towns	So
DT	78	Mac Tuiaea	So
NT	67	Sekou Wiggs	Sr

Special teams

Pos.	#	Name	Class
PK	19	Nick Lentz	Fr
P	13	Sean O'Laughlin	Jr

Head coach

- Jim Lambright (5th year)

Coordinators/assistant coaches

- Randy Hart (AHC, DC, DL)
- Scott Linehan (OC, WR)
- Dick Baird (LB)
- Bill Diedrick (QB)
- Rick Mallory (TE)
- Ron Milus (DB)
- Steve Morton (OL)
- Wayne Moses (RB)
- Scott Pelluer (Rov, Wh LB)
- Ikaika Malloe (GA)

Legend

- (C) Team captain
- (S) Suspended
- (I) Ineligible
- Injured
- Redshirt

== NFL draft ==
Ten Huskies were selected in the 1998 NFL draft, which lasted seven rounds (241 selections).

Player	Position	Round	Overall	Franchise
Jerome Pathon	WR	2nd	32	Indianapolis Colts
Tony Parrish	S	2nd	35	Chicago Bears
Cameron Cleeland	TE	2nd	40	New Orleans Saints
Olin Kreutz	C	3rd	64	Chicago Bears
Rashaan Shehee	RB	3rd	88	Kansas City Chiefs
Jeremy Brigham	TE	5th	127	Oakland Raiders
Jerry Jensen	LB	5th	136	Carolina Panthers
Benji Olson	G	5th	139	Tennessee Oilers
Fred Coleman	WR	6th	160	Buffalo Bills
Jason Chorak	LB	7th	236	St. Louis Rams
