= 1997 UTEP Miners football team =

American college football season

1997 UTEP Miners football
- Conference: Western Athletic Conference
- Mountain Division
- Record: 4–7 (3–5 WAC)
- Head coach: Charlie Bailey (5th season)
- Offensive coordinator: Gary Nord (1st season)
- Defensive coordinator: Ronnie Jones (2nd season)
- Home stadium: Sun Bowl

1997 Western Athletic Conference football standings
	Conf.			Overall
Team	W		L	W		L
Mountain Division
New Mexico x	6	–	2	9	–	4
Rice	5	–	3	7	–	4
SMU	5	–	3	6	–	5
Utah	5	–	3	6	–	5
BYU	4	–	4	6	–	5
UTEP	3	–	5	4	–	7
Tulsa	2	–	6	2	–	9
TCU	1	–	7	1	–	10
Pacific Division
No. 17 Colorado State x$	7	–	1	11	–	2
Air Force	6	–	2	10	–	3
Fresno State	5	–	3	6	–	6
Wyoming	4	–	4	7	–	6
San Diego State	4	–	4	5	–	7
San Jose State	4	–	4	4	–	7
UNLV	2	–	6	3	–	8
Hawaii	1	–	7	3	–	9
Championship: Colorado State 41, New Mexico 13
$ – Conference champion; x – Division champion/co-champions; Rankings from AP Poll

The 1997 UTEP Miners football team was an American football team that represented the University of Texas at El Paso in the Western Athletic Conference during the 1997 NCAA Division I-A football season. In their fifth year under head coach Charlie Bailey, the team compiled a 4–7 record.

== Schedule ==
Date	Opponent	Site	Result	Attendance	Source
September 6	at No. 10 LSU*	Tiger Stadium; Baton Rouge, LA	L 3–55	80,015	
September 13	New Mexico	Sun Bowl; El Paso, TX	L 20–38	19,857	
September 20	at Utah	Robert Rice Stadium; Salt Lake City, UT	L 3–56	28,820	
September 27	New Mexico State*	Sun Bowl; El Paso, TX (rivalry)	W 24–16	21,779	
October 4	at Clemson*	Memorial Stadium; Clemson, SC	L 7–39	62,000	
October 11	at Tulsa	Skelly Stadium; Tulsa, OK	W 33–18	16,830	
October 18	San Jose State^{†}	Sun Bowl; El Paso, TX	L 7–10	25,908	
November 1	No. 25 BYU	Sun Bowl; El Paso, TX	W 14–3	18,630	
November 8	at SMU	Cotton Bowl; Dallas, TX	L 14–28	21,280	
November 15	TCU	Sun Bowl; El Paso, TX	W 24–17	16,247	
November 22	at Rice	Rice Stadium; Houston, TX	L 13–31	18,014	
*Non-conference game; ^{†}Homecoming; Rankings from AP Poll released prior to the game
