= 1997 TCU Horned Frogs football team =

American college football season

1997 TCU Horned Frogs football
- Conference: Western Athletic Conference
- Mountain Division
- Record: 1–10 (1–7 WAC)
- Head coach: Pat Sullivan (6th season)
- Offensive coordinator: Pete Hoener (6th season)
- Defensive coordinator: Phil Bennett (1st season)
- Home stadium: Amon G. Carter Stadium

1997 Western Athletic Conference football standings
	Conf.			Overall
Team	W		L	W		L
Mountain Division
New Mexico x	6	–	2	9	–	4
Rice	5	–	3	7	–	4
SMU	5	–	3	6	–	5
Utah	5	–	3	6	–	5
BYU	4	–	4	6	–	5
UTEP	3	–	5	4	–	7
Tulsa	2	–	6	2	–	9
TCU	1	–	7	1	–	10
Pacific Division
No. 17 Colorado State x$	7	–	1	11	–	2
Air Force	6	–	2	10	–	3
Fresno State	5	–	3	6	–	6
Wyoming	4	–	4	7	–	6
San Diego State	4	–	4	5	–	7
San Jose State	4	–	4	4	–	7
UNLV	2	–	6	3	–	8
Hawaii	1	–	7	3	–	9
Championship: Colorado State 41, New Mexico 13
$ – Conference champion; x – Division champion/co-champions; Rankings from AP Poll

The 1997 TCU Horned Frogs football team represented Texas Christian University (TCU) in the 1997 NCAA Division I-A football season. The Horned Frogs finished the season 1–10 overall and 1–7 in the Western Athletic Conference. The team was coached by Pat Sullivan, in his sixth and final year as head coach. The Frogs played their home games in Amon G. Carter Stadium, which is located on campus in Fort Worth, Texas.

== Schedule ==
Date	Time	Opponent	Site	Result	Attendance	Source
September 6	1:00 p.m.	at Kansas*	Memorial Stadium; Lawrence, KS	L 10–17	32,100	
September 13	7:05 p.m.	Utah	Amon G. Carter Stadium; Fort Worth, TX	L 18–32	25,382	
September 20	7:00 p.m.	at Vanderbilt*	Vanderbilt Stadium; Nashville, TN	L 16–40	34,824	
October 4	8:05 p.m.	No. 5 North Carolina*	Amon G. Carter Stadium; Fort Worth, TX	L 10–31	29,415	
October 11		at UNLV	Sam Boyd Stadium; Whitney, NV	L 19–21	18,777	
October 18		Tulsa	Amon G. Carter Stadium; Fort Worth, TX	L 22–33	23,813	
October 25	12:00 p.m.	at BYU	Cougar Stadium; Provo, UT	L 10–31	63,004	
November 1		New Mexico	Amon G. Carter Stadium; Fort Worth, TX	L 10–40		
November 8		Rice	Rice Stadium; Houston, TX	L 19–38		
November 15		at UTEP	Sun Bowl; El Paso, TX	L 17–24	16,247	
November 20	7:05 p.m.	SMU	Amon G. Carter Stadium; Fort Worth, TX (rivalry)	W 21–18	19,094	
*Non-conference game; Rankings from AP Poll released prior to the game; All times are in Central time
