= 1997 Wyoming Cowboys football team =

American college football season

1997 Wyoming Cowboys football
- Conference: Western Athletic Conference
- Pacific Division
- Record: 7–6 (4–4 WAC)
- Head coach: Dana Dimel (1st season)
- Offensive coordinator: Todd Whitten (1st season)
- Defensive coordinator: Vic Koenning (1st season)
- Home stadium: War Memorial Stadium

1997 Western Athletic Conference football standings
	Conf.			Overall
Team	W		L	W		L
Mountain Division
New Mexico x	6	–	2	9	–	4
Rice	5	–	3	7	–	4
SMU	5	–	3	6	–	5
Utah	5	–	3	6	–	5
BYU	4	–	4	6	–	5
UTEP	3	–	5	4	–	7
Tulsa	2	–	6	2	–	9
TCU	1	–	7	1	–	10
Pacific Division
No. 17 Colorado State x$	7	–	1	11	–	2
Air Force	6	–	2	10	–	3
Fresno State	5	–	3	6	–	6
Wyoming	4	–	4	7	–	6
San Diego State	4	–	4	5	–	7
San Jose State	4	–	4	4	–	7
UNLV	2	–	6	3	–	8
Hawaii	1	–	7	3	–	9
Championship: Colorado State 41, New Mexico 13
$ – Conference champion; x – Division champion/co-champions; Rankings from AP Poll

The 1997 Wyoming Cowboys football team represented the University of Wyoming as a member of the Pacific Division of the Western Athletic Conference during the 1997 NCAA Division I-A football season. Led by first-year head coach Dana Dimel, the Cowboys compiled an overall record of 7–6 record with mark 4–4 in conference play, placing in a three-way tie for third in the WAC's Pacific Division. The team played home games at War Memorial Stadium in Laramie, Wyoming.

== Schedule ==
Date	Opponent	Site	Result	Attendance
August 28	at No. 9 Ohio State*	Ohio Stadium; Columbus, OH	L 10–24	89,122
September 6	Iowa State*	War Memorial Stadium; Laramie, WY	W 56–10	20,857
September 13	at Hawaii	Aloha Stadium; Halawa, HI	W 35–6	
September 20	San Jose State	War Memorial Stadium; Laramie, WY	W 30–10	
September 27	at Colorado*	Folsom Field; Boulder, CO	L 19–20	50,971
October 4	Montana*	War Memorial Stadium; Laramie, WY	W 28–13	18,608
October 11	at Nevada*	Mackay Stadium; Reno, NV	W 34–30	
October 18	Colorado State	War Memorial Stadium; Laramie, WY (Border War)	L 7–14	34,745
October 25	at SMU	Cotton Bowl; Dallas, TX	L 17–22	22,403
November 1	San Diego State	War Memorial Stadium; Laramie, WY	W 41–17	15,157
November 8	UNLV	War Memorial Stadium; Laramie, WY	W 35–23	
November 15	at Air Force	Falcon Stadium; Colorado Springs, CO	L 3–14	
November 22	at Fresno State	Bulldog Stadium; Fresno, CA	L 7–24	30,035
*Non-conference game; Rankings from AP Poll released prior to the game

== Game summaries ==
=== Ohio State ===
Wyoming Cowboys at Ohio State Buckeyes

Quarter	1	2	3	4	Total
Wyoming	3	0	7	0	10
Ohio State	10	0	14	0	24

at Ohio Stadium, Columbus, Ohio

- Date: August 28, 1997
- Game time: 8:00 p.m. EST
- Game weather: 75°, Clear, wind 5-10 N
- Game attendance: 89,112
- Referee: J. Kemerling
- Box Score

Game information
First quarter
- OSU - Stanley Jackson 41-yard run (Dan Stultz kick)
- WYO - Cory Wedel 38-yard field goal
- OSU - Dan Stultz kick 40-yard field goal

Second quarter

- No scoring

Third quarter

- OSU - Michael Wiley 32-yard run (Dan Stultz kick)
- OSU - Dee Miller 45-yard pass from Stanley Jackson (Dan Stultz kick)
- WYO - Mike Jenkins 11-yard run (Cory Wedel kick)

Fourth quarter

- No scoring
