= 1997 Oregon State Beavers football team =

American college football season

1997 Oregon State Beavers football
- Conference: Pacific-10 Conference
- Record: 3–8 (0–8 Pac-10)
- Head coach: Mike Riley (1st season)
- Offensive coordinator: Paul Chryst (1st season)
- Defensive coordinator: Greg Newhouse (1st season)
- Home stadium: Parker Stadium

1997 Pacific-10 Conference football standings
	Conf.			Overall
Team	W		L	W		L
No. 9 Washington State +	7	–	1	10	–	2
No. 5 UCLA +	7	–	1	10	–	2
No. 14 Arizona State	6	–	2	9	–	3
No. 18 Washington	5	–	3	8	–	4
Arizona	4	–	4	7	–	5
USC	4	–	4	6	–	5
Oregon	3	–	5	7	–	5
Stanford	3	–	5	5	–	6
California	1	–	7	3	–	8
Oregon State	0	–	8	3	–	8
+ – Conference co-champions; Rankings from AP Poll

The 1997 Oregon State Beavers football team represented Oregon State University as a member of the Pacific-10 Conference (Pac-10) during the 1997 NCAA Division I-A football season. Led by first-year head coach Mike Riley, the Beavers compiled an overall record of 3–8 with a mark of 0–8 in conference play, placing last out of ten teams in the Pac-10. The team played home games at Parker Stadium in Corvallis, Oregon.

== Schedule ==
Date	Time	Opponent	Site	TV	Result	Attendance
September 6	1:00 pm	North Texas*	Parker Stadium; Corvallis, OR		W 33–7	30,818
September 20	1:00 pm	No. 21 Stanford	Parker Stadium; Corvallis, OR		L 24–27	26,244
September 27	1:00 pm	No. 25 Arizona State	Parker Stadium; Corvallis, OR		L 10–13	25,873
October 4	1:00 pm	San Jose State*	Parker Stadium; Corvallis, OR		W 26–12	19,168
October 11	1:00 pm	Utah State*	Parker Stadium; Corvallis, OR		W 24–16	23,210
October 18	3:30 pm	at No. 17 UCLA	Rose Bowl; Pasadena, CA	FSN	L 10–34	38,165
October 25	3:30 pm	No. 7 Washington	Parker Stadium; Corvallis, OR	FSN	L 17–45	28,067
November 1	12:30 pm	at California	California Memorial Stadium; Berkeley, CA		L 14–33	32,000
November 8	6:00 pm	at Arizona	Arizona Stadium; Tucson, AZ		L 7–27	39,754
November 15	1:00 pm	USC	Parker Stadium; Corvallis, OR		L 0–23	20,938
November 22	1:00 pm	at Oregon	Autzen Stadium; Eugene, OR (Civil War)		L 30–48	45,735
*Non-conference game; Rankings from AP Poll released prior to the game; All times are in Pacific time
