= 1997 Rice Owls football team =

American college football season

1997 Rice Owls football
- Conference: Western Athletic Conference
- Mountain Division
- Record: 7–4 (5–3 WAC)
- Head coach: Ken Hatfield (4th season)
- Offensive coordinator: David Lee (4th season)
- Defensive coordinator: Hardee McCrary (1st season)
- Home stadium: Rice Stadium

1997 Western Athletic Conference football standings
	Conf.			Overall
Team	W		L	W		L
Mountain Division
New Mexico x	6	–	2	9	–	4
Rice	5	–	3	7	–	4
SMU	5	–	3	6	–	5
Utah	5	–	3	6	–	5
BYU	4	–	4	6	–	5
UTEP	3	–	5	4	–	7
Tulsa	2	–	6	2	–	9
TCU	1	–	7	1	–	10
Pacific Division
No. 17 Colorado State x$	7	–	1	11	–	2
Air Force	6	–	2	10	–	3
Fresno State	5	–	3	6	–	6
Wyoming	4	–	4	7	–	6
San Diego State	4	–	4	5	–	7
San Jose State	4	–	4	4	–	7
UNLV	2	–	6	3	–	8
Hawaii	1	–	7	3	–	9
Championship: Colorado State 41, New Mexico 13
$ – Conference champion; x – Division champion/co-champions; Rankings from AP Poll

The 1997 Rice Owls football team was an American football team that represented Rice University as a member of the Mountain Division in the Western Athletic Conference (WAC) during the 1997 NCAA Division I-A football season. In their fourth year under head coach Ken Hatfield, the Owls compiled an overall record of 7–4 record with a mark of 5–3 in conference play, placing in three-way tie for second in the WAC's Mountain Division. The team played home games at Rice Stadium in Houston.

== Schedule ==
Date	Opponent	Site	Result	Attendance	Source
September 6	Air Force	Rice Stadium; Houston, TX	L 12–41		
September 13	at Tulane*	Louisiana Superdome; New Orleans, LA	W 30–24	19,602	
September 20	at Northwestern*	Ryan Field; Evanston, IL	W 40–34	32,762	
September 27	Texas*	Rice Stadium; Houston, TX (rivalry)	L 31–38	53,811	
October 4	at Tulsa	Skelly Stadium; Tulsa, OK	W 42–24	19,994	
October 11	No. 21 BYU	Rice Stadium; Houston, TX	W 27–14	23,814	
October 18	at New Mexico	University Stadium; Albuquerque, NM	W 35–23		
November 1	at SMU	Cotton Bowl; Dallas, TX (rivalry)	L 6–24	20,024	
November 8	TCU	Rice Stadium; Houston, TX	W 38–19		
November 15	at Utah	Robert Rice Stadium; Salt Lake City, UT	L 14–31	27,049	
November 22	UTEP	Rice Stadium; Houston, TX	W 31–13	18,014	
*Non-conference game; Rankings from AP Poll released prior to the game
