= 1997 Fresno State Bulldogs football team =

American college football season

1997 Fresno State Bulldogs football
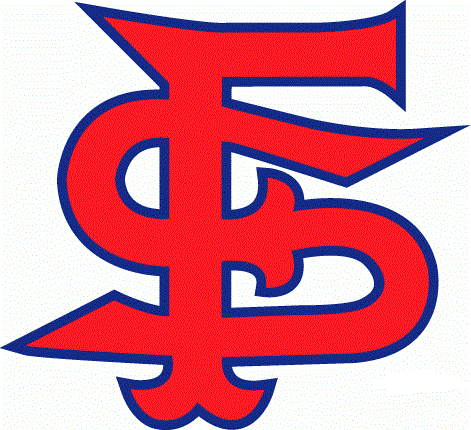
- Conference: Western Athletic Conference
- Pacific Division
- Record: 6–6 (5–3 WAC)
- Head coach: Pat Hill (1st season)
- Offensive coordinator: Jeff Tedford (5th season)
- Offensive scheme: Pro-style
- Defensive coordinator: Kevin Coyle (1st season)
- Base defense: 4–3
- Home stadium: Bulldog Stadium

1997 Western Athletic Conference football standings
	Conf.			Overall
Team	W		L	W		L
Mountain Division
New Mexico x	6	–	2	9	–	4
Rice	5	–	3	7	–	4
SMU	5	–	3	6	–	5
Utah	5	–	3	6	–	5
BYU	4	–	4	6	–	5
UTEP	3	–	5	4	–	7
Tulsa	2	–	6	2	–	9
TCU	1	–	7	1	–	10
Pacific Division
No. 17 Colorado State x$	7	–	1	11	–	2
Air Force	6	–	2	10	–	3
Fresno State	5	–	3	6	–	6
Wyoming	4	–	4	7	–	6
San Diego State	4	–	4	5	–	7
San Jose State	4	–	4	4	–	7
UNLV	2	–	6	3	–	8
Hawaii	1	–	7	3	–	9
Championship: Colorado State 41, New Mexico 13
$ – Conference champion; x – Division champion/co-champions; Rankings from AP Poll

The 1997 Fresno State Bulldogs football team represented California State University, Fresno as a member of the Pacific Division of the Western Athletic Conference (WAC) during the 1997 NCAA Division I-A football season. Led by first-year head coach Pat Hill, Fresno State compiled an overall record of 6–6 with a mark of 5–3 in conference play, placing third in the WAC's Pacific Division. The Bulldogs played their home games at Bulldog Stadium in Fresno, California.

== Schedule ==
Date	Time	Opponent	Site	TV	Result	Attendance	Source
August 30		Portland State*	Bulldog Stadium; Fresno, CA		W 35–7	33,114	
September 6	6:00 p.m.	Baylor*	Bulldog Stadium; Fresno, CA		L 35–37	32,266	
September 13	4:00 p.m.	at Oklahoma State*	Lewis Field; Stillwater, OK		L 0–35	36,000	
September 20	2:00 p.m.	at Oregon*	Autzen Stadium; Eugene, OR		L 40–43 ^{OT}	38,288	
October 2	5:00 p.m.	Utah	Bulldog Stadium; Fresno, CA	ESPN	W 27–13	37,994	
October 11	10:05 p.m.	at Hawaii	Aloha Stadium; Halawa, HI (rivalry)		L 16–28	28,206	
October 18		at No. 18 Air Force	Falcon Stadium; Colorado Springs, CO		W 20–17	45,597	
October 25		UNLV	Bulldog Stadium; Fresno, CA		W 46–28	38,002	
November 1		at San Jose State	Spartan Stadium; San Jose, CA (rivalry)		W 53–12	18,753	
November 8		at Colorado State	Hughes Stadium; Fort Collins, CO		L 3–41	27,641	
November 15		San Diego State	Bulldog Stadium; Fresno, CA (rivalry)	Cox 4	L 19–20	34,195	
November 22		Wyoming	Bulldog Stadium; Fresno, CA		W 24–7	30,035	
*Non-conference game; Rankings from AP Poll released prior to the game; All times are in Pacific time

== Team players in the NFL ==
The following were selected in the 1998 NFL draft.

Player	Position	Round	Overall	NFL team
Chris Conrad	Tackle	3	66	Pittsburgh Steelers
Michael Pittman	Running back	4	95	Arizona Cardinals
