= 1997 Tulsa Golden Hurricane football team =

American college football season

1997 Tulsa Golden Hurricane football
- Conference: Western Athletic Conference
- Mountain Division
- Record: 2–9 (2–6 WAC)
- Head coach: David Rader (10th season)
- Offensive coordinator: Rockey Felker (3rd season)
- Defensive coordinator: Pat Henderson (1st season)
- Home stadium: Skelly Stadium

1997 Western Athletic Conference football standings
	Conf.			Overall
Team	W		L	W		L
Mountain Division
New Mexico x	6	–	2	9	–	4
Rice	5	–	3	7	–	4
SMU	5	–	3	6	–	5
Utah	5	–	3	6	–	5
BYU	4	–	4	6	–	5
UTEP	3	–	5	4	–	7
Tulsa	2	–	6	2	–	9
TCU	1	–	7	1	–	10
Pacific Division
No. 17 Colorado State x$	7	–	1	11	–	2
Air Force	6	–	2	10	–	3
Fresno State	5	–	3	6	–	6
Wyoming	4	–	4	7	–	6
San Diego State	4	–	4	5	–	7
San Jose State	4	–	4	4	–	7
UNLV	2	–	6	3	–	8
Hawaii	1	–	7	3	–	9
Championship: Colorado State 41, New Mexico 13
$ – Conference champion; x – Division champion/co-champions; Rankings from AP Poll

The 1997 Tulsa Golden Hurricane football team represented the University of Tulsa during the 1997 NCAA Division I-A football season. In their tenth year under head coach David Rader, the Golden Hurricane compiled a 2–9 record. The team's statistical leaders included quarterback John Fitzgerald with 2,003 passing yards, Charlie Higgins with 1,043 rushing yards, and Damon Savage with 1,084 receiving yards.

== Schedule ==
Date	Opponent	Site	Result	Attendance
August 28	at Cincinnati*	Nippert Stadium; Cincinnati, OH	L 24–34	17,591
September 13	at Iowa*	Kinnick Stadium; Iowa City, IA	L 16–54	64,893
September 20	Missouri*	Skelly Stadium; Tulsa, OK	L 21–42	40,385
October 4	Rice^{†}	Skelly Stadium; Tulsa, OK	L 24–42	19,994
October 11	UTEP	Skelly Stadium; Tulsa, OK	L 18–33	20,000
October 18	at TCU	Amon G. Carter Stadium; Fort Worth, TX	W 33–22	23,813
October 26	at Colorado State	Hughes Stadium; Fort Collins, CO	L 8–44	27,542
November 1	Utah	Skelly Stadium; Tulsa, OK	W 21–13	19,864
November 8	at BYU	Cougar Stadium; Provo, UT	L 39–49	64,200
November 15	SMU	Skelly Stadium; Tulsa, OK	L 41–42	15,234
November 22	at New Mexico	University Stadium; Albuquerque, NM	L 13–51	29,217
*Non-conference game; ^{†}Homecoming

== Roster ==
1997 Tulsa Golden Hurricane football team roster
Players			Coaches
Offense: Pos. / # / Name / Class; QB / / John Fitzgerald / Jr	Defense: Pos. / # / Name / Class	Special teams: Pos. / # / Name / Class	Head coach: David Rader; Coordinators/assistant coaches Legend: (C) Team captain; (S) Suspended; (I) Ineligible; Injured; Redshirt
