= 1997 Hawaii Rainbow Warriors football team =

American college football season

1997 Hawaii Rainbow Warriors football
- Conference: Western Athletic Conference
- Record: 3–9 (1–7 WAC)
- Head coach: Fred von Appen (2nd season)
- Offensive coordinator: Wally English (1st season)
- Offensive scheme: Pro-style
- Defensive coordinator: Don Lindsey (2nd season)
- Base defense: 4–3
- Home stadium: Aloha Stadium

1997 Western Athletic Conference football standings
	Conf.			Overall
Team	W		L	W		L
Mountain Division
New Mexico x	6	–	2	9	–	4
Rice	5	–	3	7	–	4
SMU	5	–	3	6	–	5
Utah	5	–	3	6	–	5
BYU	4	–	4	6	–	5
UTEP	3	–	5	4	–	7
Tulsa	2	–	6	2	–	9
TCU	1	–	7	1	–	10
Pacific Division
No. 17 Colorado State x$	7	–	1	11	–	2
Air Force	6	–	2	10	–	3
Fresno State	5	–	3	6	–	6
Wyoming	4	–	4	7	–	6
San Diego State	4	–	4	5	–	7
San Jose State	4	–	4	4	–	7
UNLV	2	–	6	3	–	8
Hawaii	1	–	7	3	–	9
Championship: Colorado State 41, New Mexico 13
$ – Conference champion; x – Division champion/co-champions; Rankings from AP Poll

The 1997 Hawaii Rainbow Warriors football team represented the University of Hawaiʻi at Mānoa in the Western Athletic Conference during the 1997 NCAA Division I-A football season. In their second season under head coach Fred von Appen, the Rainbow Warriors compiled a 3–9 record.

== Schedule ==
Date	Time	Opponent	Site	TV	Result	Attendance	Source
August 30	3:00 pm	Minnesota*	Aloha Stadium; Halawa, HI		W 17–3	35,248	
September 6	7:05 pm	Cal State Northridge*	Aloha Stadium; Halawa, HI		W 34–21	33,138	
September 13	7:05 pm	Wyoming	Aloha Stadium; Halawa, HI (rivalry)		L 6–35	42,369	
September 20	4:05 pm	at UNLV	Sam Boyd Stadium; Whitney, NV		L 15–25	27,117	
October 4	9:30 am	at Colorado State	Hughes Stadium; Fort Collins, CO		L 0–63	30,047	
October 11	7:05 pm	Fresno State	Aloha Stadium; Halawa, HI (rivalry)		W 28–16	28,206	
October 18	8:00 am	at BYU	Cougar Stadium; Provo, UT	KSL	L 3–17	64,558	
October 25	7:05 pm	San Diego State	Aloha Stadium; Halawa, HI	Cox 4	L 3–10	29,342	
November 1	7:05 pm	Air Force	Aloha Stadium; Halawa, HI (rivalry)		L 27–34	29,850	
November 15	10:00 am	at San Jose State	Spartan Stadium; San Jose, CA (Dick Tomey Legacy Game)		L 14–38	9,437	
November 22	7:05 pm	Northeast Louisiana^{†}	Aloha Stadium; Halawa, HI		L 20–23 ^{OT}	27,862	
November 29	3:30 pm	Notre Dame*	Aloha Stadium; Halawa, HI	ESPN	L 22–23	41,509	
*Non-conference game; ^{†}Homecoming; All times are in Hawaii–Aleutian time
