= 1997 New Mexico Lobos football team =

American college football season

1997 New Mexico Lobos football

WAC Mountain Division champion

WAC Championship Game, L 13–41 vs. Colorado State

Insight.com Bowl, L 14–20 vs. Arizona
- Conference: Western Athletic Conference
- Mountain Division
- Record: 9–4 (6–2 WAC)
- Head coach: Dennis Franchione (6th season)
- Offensive coordinator: Dennis Darnell (4th season)
- Offensive scheme: Multiple
- Defensive coordinator: Gary Patterson (2nd season)
- Base defense: 4–2–5
- Home stadium: University Stadium

1997 Western Athletic Conference football standings
| | Conf. | | | Overall |
| Team | W | | L | W | | L |
|---|---|---|---|---|---|---|
Mountain Division
| New Mexico x | 6 | – | 2 | 9 | – | 4 |
| Rice | 5 | – | 3 | 7 | – | 4 |
| SMU | 5 | – | 3 | 6 | – | 5 |
| Utah | 5 | – | 3 | 6 | – | 5 |
| BYU | 4 | – | 4 | 6 | – | 5 |
| UTEP | 3 | – | 5 | 4 | – | 7 |
| Tulsa | 2 | – | 6 | 2 | – | 9 |
| TCU | 1 | – | 7 | 1 | – | 10 |
Pacific Division
| No. 17 Colorado State x$ | 7 | – | 1 | 11 | – | 2 |
| Air Force | 6 | – | 2 | 10 | – | 3 |
| Fresno State | 5 | – | 3 | 6 | – | 6 |
| Wyoming | 4 | – | 4 | 7 | – | 6 |
| San Diego State | 4 | – | 4 | 5 | – | 7 |
| San Jose State | 4 | – | 4 | 4 | – | 7 |
| UNLV | 2 | – | 6 | 3 | – | 8 |
| Hawaii | 1 | – | 7 | 3 | – | 9 |
Championship: Colorado State 41, New Mexico 13
$ – Conference champion; x – Division champion/co-champions; Rankings from AP Poll

The 1997 New Mexico Lobos football team represented the University of New Mexico in the 1997 NCAA Division I-A football season. The Lobos were led by sixth-year head coach Dennis Franchione, in his final year with the team, and played their home games at University Stadium in Albuquerque, New Mexico. They finished the regular season atop the Mountain Division of the Western Athletic Conference with a 6–2 conference record, and lost to Colorado State in the 1997 WAC Championship Game. New Mexico was invited to the 1997 Insight.com Bowl, their first bowl game since 1961, where they lost to Arizona, 14–20.

The season is also notable for the Lobos because their brief appearance in the Coaches' Poll in Week 15 was the last time that the team has been featured in either the Coaches' Poll or the AP Poll, until the 2026 season.

== Schedule ==
| Date | Opponent | Site | Result | Attendance | Source |
|---|---|---|---|---|---|
| August 30 | Northern Arizona* | University Stadium; Albuquerque, NM | W 33–10 | 25,643 | |
| September 6 | New Mexico State* | University Stadium; Albuquerque, NM (Rio Grande Rivalry) | W 61–24 | | |
| September 13 | at UTEP | Sun Bowl; El Paso, TX | W 38–20 | 19,857 | |
| September 20 | at Utah State* | Romney Stadium; Logan, UT | W 25–22 | 15,112 | |
| October 4 | SMU^{†} | University Stadium; Albuquerque, NM | W 22–15 | 33,128 | |
| October 11 | at San Diego State | Jack Murphy Stadium; San Diego, CA | W 36–21 | 28,732 | |
| October 18 | Rice | University Stadium; Albuquerque, NM | L 23–35 | | |
| October 25 | at Utah | Robert Rice Stadium; Salt Lake City, UT | L 10–15 | 28,129 | |
| November 1 | at TCU | Amon G. Carter Stadium; Fort Worth, TX | W 40–10 | | |
| November 15 | BYU | University Stadium; Albuquerque, NM | W 38–28 | 30,363 | |
| November 22 | Tulsa | University Stadium; Albuquerque, NM | W 51–13 | 29,217 | |
| December 6 | vs. No. 20 Colorado State | Sam Boyd Stadium; Whitney, NV (WAC Championship Game) | L 13–41 | 12,706 | |
| December 27 | at Arizona* | Arizona Stadium; Tucson, AZ (Insight.com Bowl, rivalry) | L 14–20 | 49,385 | |
*Non-conference game; ^{†}Homecoming; Rankings from AP Poll released prior to the game

== Rankings ==
Ranking movements Legend: ██ Increase in ranking ██ Decrease in ranking — = Not ranked
| | Week | | | | | | | | | | | | | | | | | |
| Poll | Pre | 1 | 2 | 3 | 4 | 5 | 6 | 7 | 8 | 9 | 10 | 11 | 12 | 13 | 14 | 15 | 16 | Final |
|---|---|---|---|---|---|---|---|---|---|---|---|---|---|---|---|---|---|---|
| AP | — | — | — | — | — | — | — | — | — | — | — | — | — | — | — | — | — | — |
| Coaches | — | | — | — | — | — | — | — | — | — | — | — | — | — | — | 25 | — | — |

== Roster ==
1997 New Mexico Lobos football team roster
Players
Coaches
Offense

| Pos. | # | Name | Class |

Defense

| Pos. | # | Name | Class |
|---|---|---|---|
| WS | 6 | Scott McGarrahan | Sr |
| SS, P | 10 | Danny Gonzales | Jr |
| FS | 16 | Billy Austin | Sr |
| LB | 44 | Brian Urlacher | So |
| LB | 51 | Bart Barnard | Sr |

Special teams

| Pos. | # | Name | Class |

Head coach

- Dennis Franchione

Coordinators/assistant coaches

Legend

- (C) Team captain
- (S) Suspended
- (I) Ineligible
- Injured
- Redshirt
