= 1997 Colorado State Rams football team =

American college football season

1997 Colorado State Rams football
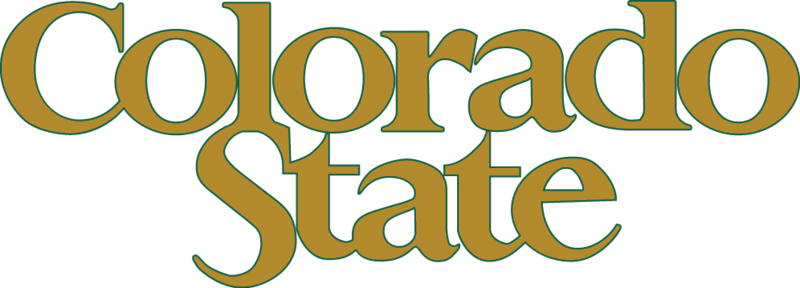

WAC champion WAC Pacific Division champion Holiday Bowl champion

Holiday Bowl, W 35–24 vs. Missouri
- Conference: Western Athletic Conference
- Pacific Division

Ranking
- Coaches: No. 16
- AP: No. 17
- Record: 11–2 (7–1 WAC)
- Head coach: Sonny Lubick (5th season)
- Offensive coordinator: Steve Fairchild (1st season)
- Defensive coordinator: Larry Kerr (5th season)
- Home stadium: Hughes Stadium

1997 Western Athletic Conference football standings
| | Conf. | | | Overall |
| Team | W | | L | W | | L |
|---|---|---|---|---|---|---|
Mountain Division
| New Mexico x | 6 | – | 2 | 9 | – | 4 |
| Rice | 5 | – | 3 | 7 | – | 4 |
| SMU | 5 | – | 3 | 6 | – | 5 |
| Utah | 5 | – | 3 | 6 | – | 5 |
| BYU | 4 | – | 4 | 6 | – | 5 |
| UTEP | 3 | – | 5 | 4 | – | 7 |
| Tulsa | 2 | – | 6 | 2 | – | 9 |
| TCU | 1 | – | 7 | 1 | – | 10 |
Pacific Division
| No. 17 Colorado State x$ | 7 | – | 1 | 11 | – | 2 |
| Air Force | 6 | – | 2 | 10 | – | 3 |
| Fresno State | 5 | – | 3 | 6 | – | 6 |
| Wyoming | 4 | – | 4 | 7 | – | 6 |
| San Diego State | 4 | – | 4 | 5 | – | 7 |
| San Jose State | 4 | – | 4 | 4 | – | 7 |
| UNLV | 2 | – | 6 | 3 | – | 8 |
| Hawaii | 1 | – | 7 | 3 | – | 9 |
Championship: Colorado State 41, New Mexico 13
$ – Conference champion; x – Division champion/co-champions; Rankings from AP Poll

The 1997 Colorado State Rams football team represented Colorado State University in the 1997 NCAA Division I-A football season. The Rams were led by fifth-year head coach Sonny Lubick and played their home games at Hughes Stadium in Fort Collins, Colorado. Colorado State competed as a member of the Western Athletic Conference in the Pacific Division. They won that division with a 7–1 conference record, earning them a spot in the 1997 WAC Championship Game, where they defeated New Mexico to earn their third WAC title in four years. They were invited to the 1997 Holiday Bowl, where they defeated Missouri, and were ranked 17th in the final AP Poll of the season, the second ranked finish in school history and first since 1994.

== Schedule ==
| Date | Opponent | Rank | Site | Result | Attendance | Source |
|---|---|---|---|---|---|---|
| August 30 | Nevada* | | Hughes Stadium; Fort Collins, CO | W 45–13 | 29,672 | |
| September 6 | at No. 8 Colorado* | No. 24 | Folsom Field; Boulder, CO (Rocky Mountain Showdown) | L 21–31 | 53,416 | |
| September 13 | at Utah State* | No. 25 | Romney Stadium; Logan, UT | W 35–24 | 22,097 | |
| September 20 | Air Force | No. 23 | Hughes Stadium; Fort Collins, CO (rivalry) | L 0–24 | 34,071 | |
| October 4 | Hawaii | | Hughes Stadium; Fort Collins, CO | W 63–0 | 30,047 | |
| October 11 | at San Jose State | | Spartan Stadium; San Jose, CA | W 55–20 | 10,384 | |
| October 18 | at Wyoming | | War Memorial Stadium; Laramie, WY (Border War) | W 14–7 | 34,745 | |
| October 26 | Tulsa | | Hughes Stadium; Fort Collins, CO | W 44–8 | 27,542 | |
| November 1 | at UNLV | | Sam Boyd Stadium; Whitney, NV | W 45–19 | 19,654 | |
| November 8 | Fresno State | | Hughes Stadium; Fort Collins, CO | W 41–3 | 27,641 | |
| November 22 | at San Diego State | No. 25 | Qualcomm Stadium; San Diego, CA | W 38–17 | 25,704 | |
| December 6 | vs. New Mexico | No. 20 | Sam Boyd Stadium; Whitney, NV (WAC Championship Game) | W 41–13 | 12,706 | |
| December 29 | vs. No. 19 Missouri* | No. 18 | Qualcomm Stadium; San Diego, CA (Holiday Bowl) | W 35–24 | 50,761 | |
*Non-conference game; Rankings from AP Poll released prior to the game

== Rankings ==
Ranking movements Legend: ██ Increase in ranking ██ Decrease in ranking — = Not ranked
| | Week | | | | | | | | | | | | | | | | | |
| Poll | Pre | 1 | 2 | 3 | 4 | 5 | 6 | 7 | 8 | 9 | 10 | 11 | 12 | 13 | 14 | 15 | 16 | Final |
|---|---|---|---|---|---|---|---|---|---|---|---|---|---|---|---|---|---|---|
| AP | — | — | 24 | 25 | 23 | — | — | — | — | — | — | — | — | 25 | 20 | 20 | 18 | 17 |
| Coaches | — | | 25 | — | — | — | — | — | — | — | — | — | — | 22 | 19 | 18 | 17 | 16 |

== Roster ==
1997 Colorado State Rams football team roster
Players
Coaches
Offense

| Pos. | # | Name | Class |
|---|---|---|---|
| QB | 15 | Matt Newton | Fr |
| FB | 20 | Damon Washington | Jr |
| RB | 36 | Kevin McDougal | So |
| G | 61 | Blaine Saipaia | So |
| OT | 71 | Eric Bailey | Sr |

Defense

| Pos. | # | Name | Class |
|---|---|---|---|
| DB | 38 | John Howell | Fr |
| DL | 90 | Greg Pollard | So |

Special teams

| Pos. | # | Name | Class |

Head coach

- Sonny Lubick

Coordinators/assistant coaches

- Brian Schneider STC/TE

Legend

- (C) Team captain
- (S) Suspended
- (I) Ineligible
- Injured
- Redshirt

Roster
Last update: 1998-01-15
