= 1997 Insight.com Bowl =

- 9th Insight.com Bowl
New Mexico Lobos	Arizona Wildcats
(9–3)	(6–5)
WAC	Pac-10
14	20
Head coach: Dennis Franchione	Head coach: Dick Tomey
	1	2	3	4	Total
New Mexico	0	7	7	0	14
Arizona	7	6	7	0	20
- Date: December 27, 1997
- Season: 1997
- Stadium: Arizona Stadium
- Location: Tucson, Arizona
- Referee: John Smith (Big East)
- Attendance: 49,385

United States TV coverage
- Network: ESPN
- Announcers: Charley Steiner (play-by-play); Todd Christensen (analysis); Sean Salisbury (sidelines)

The 1997 Insight.com Bowl was the ninth edition to the Insight.com Bowl, although the first played under that name. It featured the New Mexico Lobos and the Arizona Wildcats. It was a meeting of old Western Athletic Conference and Border Conference rivals.

== Scoring summary ==
- Arizona – Eafon 15-yard run (McDonald kick), 6:30, 1st
- New Mexico – Thomas 15-yard pass from Leigh (Cason kick), 12:05, 2nd
- Arizona – Canidate 3-yard run (kick failed), 7:50, 2nd
- Arizona – Eafon 1-yard run (McDonald kick), 2:07, 3rd
- New Mexico – Leigh 4-yard run (Cason kick), 00:26, 3rd

Arizona opened the scoring with a 15 yard touchdown run by Kevin Eafon, giving UA a 7–0 lead. It would be the only score of the 1st quarter. In the second quarter, New Mexico's Graham Leigh threw a 12 yard touchdown pass to Milton Thomas tying the game at 7. Trung Canidate scored on a 3 yard touchdown run, giving the Wildcats a 13–7 halftime lead. In the third quarter, Kevin Eafon scored on a 1 yard touchdown run, making it 20–7 Arizona. Graham Leigh's 4 yard touchdown run made the final score Arizona 20, New Mexico 14.

== Statistics ==
Statistics	New Mexico	Arizona
First downs	16	19
Rushing yards	140	209
Passing yards	150	89
Passes intercepted	4	2
Return yards	29	54
Total offense	290	298
Punts–average	7–40.7	9–38.7
Fumbles–lost	0–0	0–0
Penalties–yards	9–60	5–39
Time of possession	24:15	35:45

== See also ==
- Arizona–New Mexico football rivalry
