= 1997 Air Force Falcons football team =

American college football season

1997 Air Force Falcons football

Las Vegas Bowl, L 13–41 vs. Oregon
- Conference: Western Athletic Conference
- Pacific Division

Ranking
- Coaches: No. 25
- Record: 10–3 (6–2 WAC)
- Head coach: Fisher DeBerry (14th season)
- Offensive scheme: Wishbone triple option
- Co-defensive coordinators: Richard Bell (3rd season); Cal McCombs (8th season)
- Base defense: 3–4
- Captains: Chris Gizzi; Jemal Singleton; Jeff Mohr
- Home stadium: Falcon Stadium

1997 Western Athletic Conference football standings
	Conf.			Overall
Team	W		L	W		L
Mountain Division
New Mexico x	6	–	2	9	–	4
Rice	5	–	3	7	–	4
SMU	5	–	3	6	–	5
Utah	5	–	3	6	–	5
BYU	4	–	4	6	–	5
UTEP	3	–	5	4	–	7
Tulsa	2	–	6	2	–	9
TCU	1	–	7	1	–	10
Pacific Division
No. 17 Colorado State x$	7	–	1	11	–	2
Air Force	6	–	2	10	–	3
Fresno State	5	–	3	6	–	6
Wyoming	4	–	4	7	–	6
San Diego State	4	–	4	5	–	7
San Jose State	4	–	4	4	–	7
UNLV	2	–	6	3	–	8
Hawaii	1	–	7	3	–	9
Championship: Colorado State 41, New Mexico 13
$ – Conference champion; x – Division champion/co-champions; Rankings from AP Poll

The 1997 Air Force Falcons football team represented the United States Air Force Academy as a member of the Pacific Division of the Western Athletic Conference (WAC) during the 1997 NCAA Division I-A football season. Led by 14th-year head coach Fisher DeBerry, the Falcons compiled an overall record of 10–3 with a mark of 6–2 in conference play, placing second the WAC's Pacific Division. Air Force was invited to the Las Vegas Bowl, where the Falcons lost to Oregon. The team played home games at Falcon Stadium in Colorado Springs, Colorado

== Schedule ==
Date	Time	Opponent	Rank	Site	TV	Result	Attendance	Source
August 30	2:00 p.m.	Idaho*		Falcon Stadium; Colorado Springs, CO		W 14–10	41,331	
September 6		at Rice		Rice Stadium; Houston, TX		W 41–12		
September 13		UNLV		Falcon Stadium; Colorado Springs, CO		W 25–24	39,027	
September 20		at No. 23 Colorado State		Hughes Stadium; Fort Collins, CO (rivalry)		W 24–0	34,071	
September 27		San Diego State		Falcon Stadium; Colorado Springs, CO	ESPN2	W 24–18 ^{OT}	48,399	
October 4		The Citadel*	No. 23	Falcon Stadium; Colorado Springs, CO		W 17–3	42,536	
October 11		at Navy*	No. 19	Navy–Marine Corps Memorial Stadium; Annapolis, MD (Commander-in-Chief's Trophy)		W 10–7		
October 18		Fresno State	No. 18	Falcon Stadium; Colorado Springs, CO		L 17–20	45,597	
October 25		at San Jose State		Spartan Stadium; San Jose, CA	ESPN2	L 22–25		
November 1	11:05 p.m.	at Hawaii		Aloha Stadium; Halawa, HI (rivalry)		W 34–27	29,850	
November 8		Army*		Falcon Stadium; Colorado Springs, CO (Commander-in-Chief's Trophy)		W 24–0		
November 15		Wyoming		Falcon Stadium; Colorado Springs, CO		W 14–3		
December 20	4:00 p.m.	vs. Oregon*	No. 23	Sam Boyd Stadium; Las Vegas, NV (Las Vegas Bowl)	ESPN2	L 13–41	21,514	
*Non-conference game; Rankings from AP Poll released prior to the game; All times are in Mountain time

== Rankings ==
Ranking movements Legend: ██ Increase in ranking ██ Decrease in ranking — = Not ranked
	Week																	
Poll	Pre	1	2	3	4	5	6	7	8	9	10	11	12	13	14	15	16	Final
AP	—	—	—	—	—	—	23	19	18	—	—	—	—	—	24	23	23	—
Coaches	—		—	—	—	25	23	18	17	24	—	—	—	—	23	21	21	25

== Roster ==
1997 Air Force Falcons football team roster
Players
Coaches
Offense

Pos.	#	Name	Class
Sr	67	Rob Evert	Sr
OT	68	Karl Faulk	Sr
WR	6	Matt Farmer	So
FAL	8	J. T. Felton	So
QB	14	John Flynn	Jr
OL	74	Frank Mindrup	Jr
OT	78	Troy Monson	So
QB	11	Blane Morgan	Jr
WR	9	Dylan Newman	Jr
OT	79	James Norman	So
QB	15	Stephen O'Neill	So
FB	33	Ryan Paroda	Jr
C	52	Jeff Parr	Sr
C	50	Brian Phillips	Jr

Defense

Pos.	#	Name	Class
OLB	56	Steve Fernandez	Sr
OLB	91	Sean Finnan	Sr
DT	78	Bryce Fisher	Jr
LB	51	Chris Gizzi	Sr
LB	99	Michael Yanovitch	So
LB	54	C. J. Zanotti	So

Special teams

Pos.	#	Name	Class

Head coach

- Fisher DeBerry

Coordinators/assistant coaches

Legend

- (C) Team captain
- (S) Suspended
- (I) Ineligible
- Injured
- Redshirt

Roster
Last update: 1997-10-25

== Awards and honors ==
- Frank Mindrup, first-team All-WAC
