= 1997 San Diego State Aztecs football team =

American college football season

1997 San Diego State Aztecs football
- Conference: Western Athletic Conference
- Pacific Division
- Record: 5–7 (4–4 WAC)
- Head coach: Ted Tollner (4th season)
- Offensive coordinator: Dave Lay (5th season)
- Offensive scheme: Pro-style
- Defensive coordinator: Claude Gilbert (7th season)
- Base defense: 4–3
- Home stadium: Jack Murphy Stadium

1997 Western Athletic Conference football standings
	Conf.			Overall
Team	W		L	W		L
Mountain Division
New Mexico x	6	–	2	9	–	4
Rice	5	–	3	7	–	4
SMU	5	–	3	6	–	5
Utah	5	–	3	6	–	5
BYU	4	–	4	6	–	5
UTEP	3	–	5	4	–	7
Tulsa	2	–	6	2	–	9
TCU	1	–	7	1	–	10
Pacific Division
No. 17 Colorado State x$	7	–	1	11	–	2
Air Force	6	–	2	10	–	3
Fresno State	5	–	3	6	–	6
Wyoming	4	–	4	7	–	6
San Diego State	4	–	4	5	–	7
San Jose State	4	–	4	4	–	7
UNLV	2	–	6	3	–	8
Hawaii	1	–	7	3	–	9
Championship: Colorado State 41, New Mexico 13
$ – Conference champion; x – Division champion/co-champions; Rankings from AP Poll

The 1997 San Diego State Aztecs football team represented San Diego State University as a member of the Pacific Division of the Western Athletic Conference (WAC) during the 1997 NCAA Division I-A football season. Led by fourth-year head coach Ted Tollner, the Aztecs compiled an overall record of 5–7 with a mark of 4–4 conference play, placing in three-way tie for fourth in the WAC's Pacific Division. The team played home games at Jack Murphy Stadium in San Diego.

== Schedule ==
Date	Opponent	Site	TV	Result	Attendance
September 5	Navy*	Jack Murphy Stadium; San Diego, CA	Fox West	W 45–31	21,176
September 13	at No. 3 Washington*	Husky Stadium; Seattle, WA	Fox West	L 3–36	71,081
September 20	at Wisconsin*	Camp Randall Stadium; Madison, WI		L 10–38	76,864
September 27	at No. 25 Air Force	Falcon Stadium; Colorado Springs, CO	ESPN2	L 18–24 ^{OT}	48,399
October 4	at Arizona*	Arizona Stadium; Tucson, AZ	Fox West	L 28–31	39,195
October 11	New Mexico	Jack Murphy Stadium; San Diego, CA		L 21–36	28,732
October 18	UNLV	Jack Murphy Stadium; San Diego, CA		W 20–17 ^{OT}	24,628
October 25	at Hawaii	Aloha Stadium; Halawa, HI	Cox 4	W 10–3	29,342
November 1	at Wyoming	War Memorial Stadium; Laramie, WY	Cox 4	L 17–41	15,157
November 8	San Jose State^{†}	Jack Murphy Stadium; San Diego, CA	Cox 4	W 48–21	29,869
November 15	at Fresno State	Bulldog Stadium; Fresno, CA (rivalry)	Cox 4	W 20–19	34,195
November 22	No. 25 Colorado State	Jack Murphy Stadium; San Diego, CA	ESPN	L 17–38	25,704
*Non-conference game; ^{†}Homecoming; Rankings from AP Poll released prior to the game

== Team players in the NFL ==
The following were selected in the 1998 NFL draft.

Player	Position	Round	Overall	NFL team
Kyle Turley	Tackle - Guard	1	7	New Orleans Saints
Az-Zahir Hakim	Wide Receiver	4	96	St. Louis Rams
Ephraim Salaam	Tackle	7	199	Atlanta Falcons

The following finished their college career in 1997, were not drafted, but played in the NFL.

Player	Position	First NFL Team
Jason Moore	Defensive Back	1999 Denver Broncos
Justin Watson	Running Back	1999 St. Louis Rams

== Team awards ==
Award	Player
Most Valuable Player (John Simcox Memorial Trophy)	Kyle Turley
Outstanding Players (Byron H. Chase Memorial Trophy)	Kyle Turley, OT; Jonas Lewis, RB; Az-Zahir Hakim, WR; Kabeer Gbaja-Biamila, DE; Rico Curtis, SS; Andy Osbourne, LB
Team captains Dr. R. Hardy / C.E. Peterson Memorial Trophy	Kyle Turley, Off; Andy Osbourne, Def; Julius McChristian, Def
Most Inspirational Player	Julius McChristian
