= Jimmy Sprotte =

American football player (born 1974)

No. 52
- Position: Linebacker

Personal information
- Born: October 2, 1974 (age 52); Olathe, Kansas, U.S.
- Listed height: 6 ft 3 in (1.91 m)
- Listed weight: 237 lb (108 kg)

Career information
- High school: Lakeside (AZ) Blue Ridge
- College: Arizona
- NFL draft: 1998: 7th round, 205th overall pick

Career history
- Tennessee Oilers (1998)*; Cincinnati Bengals (1998–1999)
- * Offseason or practice squad member only

Career NFL statistics
- Tackles: 1
- Stats at Pro Football Reference

Jimmy Sprotte (born October 2, 1974) is an American former professional football player who was a linebacker for the Cincinnati Bengals of the National Football League (NFL) from 1998 to 1999. He played college football for the Arizona Wildcats.
