= Jerry Jensen =

American football player (born 1975)

No. 53
- Position: Linebacker

Personal information
- Born: February 26, 1975 (age 51); Downey, California, U.S.
- Listed height: 6 ft 0 in (1.83 m)
- Listed weight: 235 lb (107 kg)

Career information
- High school: Cascade (Everett, Washington)
- College: Washington
- NFL draft: 1998: 5th round, 136th overall pick

Career history
- Carolina Panthers (1998)

Awards and highlights
- First-team All-Pac-10 (1997)

Career NFL statistics
- Return yards: 9
- Stats at Pro Football Reference

Jerry Jensen (born February 26, 1975) is an American former professional football player who was a linebacker for two seasons in the National Football League (NFL) for the Carolina Panthers. He played high school football at Cascade High School in Everett, WA for the legendary Terry Ennis. He played college football for the Washington Huskies and was selected in the fifth round of the 1998 NFL draft. Jensen was a three-year starter and team captain while at Washington. As of January 8, 2013, Jensen is now the Head Football Coach of Archbishop Murphy High School in Mill Creek, WA
