= 1997 BYU Cougars football team =

American college football season

1997 BYU Cougars football
- Conference: Western Athletic Conference
- Mountain Division
- Record: 6–5 (4–4 WAC)
- Head coach: LaVell Edwards (26th season)
- Co-offensive coordinators: Norm Chow (2nd season); Roger French (17th season)
- Offensive scheme: Pro spread
- Defensive coordinator: Ken Schmidt (7th season)
- Base defense: 4–3
- Home stadium: Cougar Stadium

1997 Western Athletic Conference football standings
	Conf.			Overall
Team	W		L	W		L
Mountain Division
New Mexico x	6	–	2	9	–	4
Rice	5	–	3	7	–	4
SMU	5	–	3	6	–	5
Utah	5	–	3	6	–	5
BYU	4	–	4	6	–	5
UTEP	3	–	5	4	–	7
Tulsa	2	–	6	2	–	9
TCU	1	–	7	1	–	10
Pacific Division
No. 17 Colorado State x$	7	–	1	11	–	2
Air Force	6	–	2	10	–	3
Fresno State	5	–	3	6	–	6
Wyoming	4	–	4	7	–	6
San Diego State	4	–	4	5	–	7
San Jose State	4	–	4	4	–	7
UNLV	2	–	6	3	–	8
Hawaii	1	–	7	3	–	9
Championship: Colorado State 41, New Mexico 13
$ – Conference champion; x – Division champion/co-champions; Rankings from AP Poll

The 1997 BYU Cougars football team represented Brigham Young University in the 1997 NCAA Division I-A football season.

== Schedule ==
Date	Time	Opponent	Rank	Site	TV	Result	Attendance
September 6	1:30 pm	No. 4 Washington*	No. 19	Cougar Stadium; Provo, UT	ABC	L 20–42	65,978
September 20	8:15 pm	at No. 14 Arizona State*		Sun Devil Stadium; Tempe, AZ	FSN	W 13–10	62,376
September 27	1:00 pm	at SMU	No. 23	Cotton Bowl; Dallas, TX		W 19–16 ^{OT}	23,701
October 3	7:00 pm	Utah State*	No. 24	Cougar Stadium; Provo, UT	KSL	W 42–35	65,754
October 11	7:00 pm	at Rice	No. 21	Rice Stadium; Houston, TX	ESPN2	L 14–27	23,814
October 18	12:00 pm	Hawaii		Cougar Stadium; Provo, UT	KSL	W 17–3	64,558
October 25	12:00 pm	TCU		Cougar Stadium; Provo, UT	KSL	W 31–10	63,004
November 1	6:30 pm	at UTEP		Sun Bowl; [El Paso, TX	KSL	L 3–14	18,630
November 8	12:00 pm	Tulsa		Cougar Stadium; Provo, UT	KSL	W 49–39	64,200
November 15	3:00 pm	at New Mexico		University Stadium; Albuquerque, NM	ESPN2	L 28–38	30,363
November 22	1:30 pm	Utah		Cougar Stadium; Provo, UT (Holy War)	ABC	L 14–20	65,868
*Non-conference game; Rankings from AP Poll released prior to the game; All times are in Mountain time

== Rankings ==
Ranking movements Legend: ██ Increase in ranking ██ Decrease in ranking — = Not ranked
	Week																	
Poll	Pre	1	2	3	4	5	6	7	8	9	10	11	12	13	14	15	16	Final
AP	19	19	19	—	23	24	21	—	—	—	—	—	—	—	—	—	—	—
Coaches	17		16	—	—	24	24	21	—	—	25	—	—	—	—	—	—	—

== Roster ==
1997 BYU Cougars football team roster
Players
Coaches
Offense

Pos.	#	Name	Class
OL	79	Jason Andersen	Sr
OL	75	John Tait	So

Defense

Pos.	#	Name	Class
LB	44	Rob Morris	So
LB	46	Shay Muirbrook (C)	Sr

Special teams

Pos.	#	Name	Class

Head coach

- LaVell Edwards

Coordinators/assistant coaches

Legend

- (C) Team captain
- (S) Suspended
- (I) Ineligible
- Injured
- Redshirt

Roster
