= 1997 NCAA Division I-A football rankings =

- Season: 1997
- Bowl season: 1997–98 bowl games
- Preseason No. 1: Penn State (AP); Florida (Coaches)
- End of season champions: Michigan (AP); Nebraska (Coaches)
- Conference with most teams in final AP poll: SEC (6)

Two human polls comprised the 1997 National Collegiate Athletic Association (NCAA) Division I-A football rankings. Unlike most sports, college football's governing body, the NCAA, did not bestow a national championship; instead that title was bestowed by one or more different polling agencies. There are two main weekly polls that begin in the preseason—the AP Poll and the Coaches Poll.

== Legend ==
	Increase in ranking
	Decrease in ranking
	Not ranked previous week
	National champion
(#–#)	Win–loss record
(Italics)	Number of first place votes
т	Tied with team above or below also with this symbol

== AP Poll ==
	Preseason Aug 11	Week 1 Aug 25	Week 2 Sep 2	Week 3 Sep 8	Week 4 Sep 15	Week 5 Sep 22	Week 6 Sep 29	Week 7 Oct 6	Week 8 Oct 13	Week 9 Oct 20	Week 10 Oct 27	Week 11 Nov 3	Week 12 Nov 10	Week 13 Nov 17	Week 14 Nov 24	Week 15 Dec 1	Week 16 Dec 8	Week 17 (Final) Jan 3	
1.	Penn State (21)	Penn State (0–0) (22)	Penn State (0–0) (23)	Penn State (1–0) (22)	Penn State (2–0) (25)	Florida (3–0) (32)	Florida (4–0) (36)	Florida (5–0) (35)	Penn State (5–0) (51)	Nebraska (6–0) (33)	Nebraska (7–0) (35)	Nebraska (8–0) (46)	Michigan (9–0) (44)	Michigan (10–0) (44)	Michigan (11–0) (69)	Michigan (11–0) (69)	Michigan (11–0) (69)	Michigan (12–0) (51½)	1.
2.	Florida (12)	Florida (0–0) (14)	Florida (1–0) (14)	Florida (2–0) (15)	Washington (2–0) (19)	Penn State (3–0) (28)	Penn State (3–0) (25)	Penn State (4–0) (26)	Nebraska (5–0) (14)	Penn State (6–0) (26)	Penn State (6–0) (25)	Penn State (7–0) (16)	Florida State (9–0) (23)	Florida State (10–0) (24)	Nebraska (10–0) (1)	Nebraska (11–0) (1)	Nebraska (12–0) (1)	Nebraska (13–0) (18½)	2.
3.	Florida State (7)	Florida State (0–0) (6)	Tennessee (1–0) (7)	Washington (1–0) (14)	Florida (2–0) (14)	Nebraska (3–0) (7)	Nebraska (3–0) (6)	Nebraska (4–0) (6)	Florida State (5–0) (3)	Florida State (6–0) (9)	Florida State (7–0) (8)	Florida State (8–0) (5)	Nebraska (9–0) (3)	Nebraska (10–0) (2)	Tennessee (9–1)	Tennessee (10–1)	Tennessee (11–1)	Florida State (11–1)	3.
4.	Washington (10)	Washington (0–0) (9)	Washington (0–0) (9)	Tennessee (2–0) (6)	Tennessee (2–0) (6)	Florida State (3–0) (1)	Florida State (3–0) (1)	Florida State (4–0) (1)	North Carolina (6–0) (2)	North Carolina (7–0) (2)	Michigan (7–0)	Michigan (8–0) (1)	Ohio State (9–1)	Ohio State (10–1)	Penn State (9–1)	Florida State (10–1)	Florida State (10–1)	Florida (10–2)	4.
5.	Tennessee (8)	Tennessee (0–0) (7)	Florida State (0–0) (6)	Florida State (1–0) (4)	Florida State (2–0) (3)	North Carolina (3–0) (2)	North Carolina (4–0) (2)	North Carolina (5–0) (2)	Michigan (5–0)	Michigan (6–0)	North Carolina (7–0) (2)	North Carolina (8–0) (2)	Tennessee (7–1)	Tennessee (8–1)	Florida State (10–1)	UCLA (9–2)	UCLA (9–2)	UCLA (10–2)	5.
6.	Nebraska (4)	Nebraska (0–0) (4)	Nebraska (1–0) (4)	Nebraska (1–0) (4)	North Carolina (2–0) (1)	Michigan (2–0)	Michigan (3–0)	Michigan (4–0)	Auburn (6–0)	Florida (6–1)	Florida (6–1)	Washington (7–1)	Penn State (7–1)	Penn State (8–1)	UCLA (9–2)	Florida (9–2)	Florida (9–2)	North Carolina (11–1)	6.
7.	North Carolina (4)	North Carolina (0–0) (4)	North Carolina (0–0) (4)	North Carolina (1–0) (2)	Nebraska (2–0) (2)	Ohio State (3–0)	Ohio State (4–0)	Ohio State (5–0)	Florida (5–1)	Washington (5–1)	Washington (6–1)	Ohio State (8–1)	Georgia (7–1)	UCLA (8–2)	Florida (9–2)	North Carolina (10–1)	North Carolina (10–1)	Tennessee (11–2)	7.
8.	Colorado (3)	Colorado (0–0) (3)	Colorado (0–0) (3)	Colorado (1–0) (3)	Michigan (1–0)	Auburn (3–0)	Auburn (4–0)	Auburn (5–0)	LSU (5–1)	Tennessee (5–1)	Tennessee (5–1)	Tennessee (6–1)	North Carolina (8–1)	North Carolina (9–1)	North Carolina (10–1)	Washington State (10–1)	Washington State (10–1)	Kansas State (11–1)	8.
9.	Ohio State (1)	Ohio State (0–0) (1)	Ohio State (1–0)	Ohio State (1–0)	Ohio State (2–0)	Tennessee (2–1)	Tennessee (2–1)	Tennessee (3–1)	Tennessee (4–1)	Ohio State (6–1)	Ohio State (7–1)	Georgia (7–1)	UCLA (7–2)	Kansas State (9–1)	Ohio State (10–2)	Ohio State (10–2)	Ohio State (10–2)	Washington State (10–2)	9.
10.	LSU	LSU (0–0)	LSU (0–0)	LSU (1–0)	LSU (2–0)	Washington (2–1)	Washington (2–1)	Washington (3–1)	Washington (4–1)	Washington State (6–0)	Washington State (7–0)	UCLA (7–2)	Kansas State (8–1)	Florida (8–2)	Washington State (10–1)	Kansas State (10–1)	Kansas State (10–1)	Georgia (10–2)	10.
11.	Notre Dame	Notre Dame (0–0)	Notre Dame (0–0)	Texas (1–0)	Alabama (2–0)	Iowa (3–0)	Iowa (4–0)	Michigan State (4–0)	Ohio State (5–1)	Auburn (6–1)	Auburn (7–1)	Kansas State (7–1)	LSU (7–2)	Washington State (9–1)	Kansas State (10–1)	Auburn (9–2)	Penn State (9–2)	Auburn (10–3)	11.
12.	Texas	Texas (0–0)	Texas (0–0)	Notre Dame (1–0)	Auburn (2–0)	Michigan State (3–0)	Michigan State (3–0)	Washington State (5–0)	Michigan State (5–0)	Oklahoma State (6–0)	UCLA (6–2)	Iowa (6–2)	Florida (7–2)	Arizona State (8–2)	Arizona State (8–2)	Penn State (9–2)	Georgia (9–2)	Ohio State (10–3)	12.
13.	Miami (FL)	Syracuse (1–0)	Miami (FL) (1–0)	Miami (FL) (1–0)	Iowa (2–0)	LSU (2–1)	LSU (3–1)	Georgia (4–0)	Washington State (5–0)	UCLA (5–2)	Kansas State (6–1)	Florida (6–2)	Washington (7–2)	Auburn (8–2)	Auburn (9–2)	Georgia (9–2)	Auburn (9–3)	LSU (9–3)	13.
14.	Michigan	Miami (FL) (0–0)	Michigan (0–0)	Michigan (0–0)	Arizona State (2–0)	Virginia Tech (3–0)	Virginia Tech (4–0)	LSU (4–1)	Texas A&M (5–0)	Kansas State (5–1)	Georgia (6–1)	LSU (6–2)	Washington State (8–1)	Georgia (7–2)	Georgia (8–2)	Texas A&M (9–2)	Syracuse (9–3)	Arizona State (8–3)	14.
15.	Alabama	Michigan (0–0)	Alabama (1–0)	Alabama (1–0)	Colorado (1–1)	Washington State (3–0)	Washington State (4–0)	Texas A&M (4–0)	Iowa (4–1)	Michigan State (5–1)	Iowa (5–2)	Arizona State (6–2)	Arizona State (7–2)	Mississippi State (7–2)	Texas A&M (8–2)	Syracuse (9–3)	LSU (8–3)	Purdue (9–3)	15.
16.	Auburn	Alabama (0–0)	Auburn (0–0)	Auburn (1–0)	Clemson (2–0)	Colorado (1–1)	Colorado (2–1)	Stanford (4–1)	Oklahoma State (6–0)	Georgia (5–1)	LSU (5–2)	Washington State (7–1)	Auburn (7–2)	Texas A&M (8–2)	Syracuse (8–3)	LSU (8–3)	Arizona State (8–3)	Penn State (9–3)	16.
17.	Syracuse	Auburn (0–0)	Stanford (0–0)	Stanford (1–0)	Michigan State (2–0)	Clemson (2–1)	Kansas State (3–0)	Iowa (4–1)	UCLA (4–2)	LSU (5–2)	West Virginia (6–1)	Auburn (7–2)	Mississippi State (6–2)	Washington (7–3)	LSU (7–3)	Arizona State (8–3)	Purdue (8–3)	Colorado State (11–2)	17.
18.	Stanford	Stanford (0–0)	Clemson (0–0)	Iowa (1–0)	Virginia Tech (2–0)	Kansas State (2–0)	Georgia (3–0)	UCLA (3–2)	Air Force (7–0)	Iowa (4–2)	Purdue (6–1)	Toledo (8–0)	Texas A&M (7–2)	Syracuse (8–3)	Purdue (8–3)	Purdue (8–3)	Colorado State (10–2)	Washington (8–4)	18.
19.	BYU	BYU (0–0)	BYU (0–0)	Clemson (1–0)	Washington State (2–0)	Georgia (3–0)	Stanford (3–1)	Air Force (6–0)	Georgia (4–1)	Virginia Tech (5–1)	Oklahoma State (6–1)	Mississippi State (6–2)	Purdue (7–2) T	Virginia Tech (7–2)	Missouri (7–4)	Missouri (7–4)	Missouri (7–4)	Southern Miss (9–3)	19.
20.	Clemson	Clemson (0–0)	Iowa (0–0)	Kansas State (1–0)	Kansas State (2–0)	Stanford (2–1)	Alabama (3–1)	Oklahoma State (5–0)	Kansas State (4–1)	Texas A&M (5–1)	Arizona State (5–2)	Virginia Tech (6–2)	Virginia Tech (7–2) T	LSU (7–3)	Colorado State (9–2)	Colorado State (9–2)	Texas A&M (9–3)	Texas A&M (9–4)	20.
21.	Iowa	Iowa (0–0)	Kansas State (0–0) T	Michigan State (1–0)	Stanford (1–1)	Alabama (2–1)	Texas A&M (3–0)	BYU (3–1)	Georgia Tech (4–1)	West Virginia (5–1)	Michigan State (5–2)	Texas A&M (6–2)	Syracuse (7–3)	Missouri (7–4)	Washington (7–4)	Washington (7–4)	Washington (7–4)	Syracuse (9–4)	21.
22.	USC	Kansas State (0–0)	Northwestern (1–0) T	Virginia Tech (1–0)	Miami (FL) (1–1)	Texas A&M (2–0)	UCLA (2–2)	Kansas State (3–1)	Virginia Tech (5–1)	Purdue (5–1)	Toledo (7–0)	Syracuse (6–3)	Iowa (6–3)	West Virginia (7–4)	Mississippi State (7–3)	Southern Miss (8–3)	Southern Miss (8–3)	Mississippi (8–4)	22.
23.	Kansas State	USC (0–0)	USC (0–0)	USC (0–1)	Colorado State (2–1)	BYU (1–1)	Air Force (5–0)	Virginia Tech (4–1)	West Virginia (5–1)	Arizona State (5–2)	Virginia Tech (5–2)	Purdue (6–2)	Wisconsin (8–2)	Purdue (7–3)	Southern Miss (8–3)	Air Force (10–2)	Air Force (10–2)	Missouri (7–5)	23.
24.	Wisconsin	Northwestern (1–0)	Colorado State (1–0)	Arizona State (1–0)	UCLA (1–2)	UCLA (1–2)	BYU (2–1)	Colorado (2–2)	Wisconsin (6–1)	Toledo (6–0)	Southern Miss (5–2)	Southern Miss (6–2)	Oklahoma State (7–2)	Wisconsin (8–3)	Air Force (10–2)	Oklahoma State (8–3)	Oklahoma State (8–3)	Oklahoma State (8–4)	24.
25.	Michigan State	Michigan State (0–0)	Michigan State (0–0)	Colorado State (1–1)	Georgia (2–0)	Arizona State (2–1)	Arizona State (3–1)	Georgia Tech (3–1)	Stanford (4–2)	Mississippi (4–2)	Texas A&M (5–2)	Oklahoma State (6–2)	Missouri (6–4)	Colorado State (8–2)	Oklahoma State (8–3)	Michigan State (7–4)	Michigan State (7–4)	Georgia Tech (7–5)	25.
	Preseason Aug 11	Week 1 Aug 25	Week 2 Sep 2	Week 3 Sep 8	Week 4 Sep 15	Week 5 Sep 22	Week 6 Sep 29	Week 7 Oct 6	Week 8 Oct 13	Week 9 Oct 20	Week 10 Oct 27	Week 11 Nov 3	Week 12 Nov 10	Week 13 Nov 17	Week 14 Nov 24	Week 15 Dec 1	Week 16 Dec 8	Week 17 (Final) Jan 3	
		Dropped: Wisconsin	Dropped: Syracuse	Dropped: BYU; Northwestern	Dropped: Texas; Notre Dame; USC	Dropped: Miami (FL); Colorado State	Dropped: Clemson	Dropped: Alabama; Arizona State	Dropped: BYU; Colorado	Dropped: Air Force; Georgia Tech; Wisconsin; Stanford	Dropped: Mississippi	Dropped: West Virginia; Michigan State	Dropped: Toledo; Southern Miss	Dropped: Iowa; Oklahoma State	Dropped: Virginia Tech; West Virginia; Wisconsin	Dropped: Mississippi State	None	Dropped: Air Force; Michigan State	

== Coaches Poll ==
In the final Coaches Poll of the 1997 season, Nebraska leapfrogged Michigan to secure a share of the national championship, making it the 3rd split championship of the 1990s. Eight coaches split their first-place votes, with a final tally of 32 first-place votes for Nebraska and 30 for Michigan. The final vote count was Nebraska 1,520, Michigan 1,516.

	Preseason Aug 11	Week 2 Sep 2	Week 3 Sep 8	Week 4 Sep 15	Week 5 Sep 22	Week 6 Sep 29	Week 7 Oct 6	Week 8 Oct 13	Week 9 Oct 20	Week 10 Oct 27	Week 11 Nov 3	Week 12 Nov 10	Week 13 Nov 17	Week 14 Nov 24	Week 15 Dec 1	Week 16 Dec 8	Week 17 (Final) Jan 4	
1.	Florida (19)	Florida (1–0) (25)	Florida (2–0) (25)	Florida (2–0) (25)	Florida (3–0) (43)	Florida (4–0) (45)	Florida (5–0) (48)	Penn State (5–0) (51)	Nebraska (6–0) (28)	Nebraska (7–0) (37)	Nebraska (8–0) (50)	Florida State (9–0) (26)	Florida State (10–0) (29)	Michigan (11–0) (46)	Michigan (11–0) (58)	Michigan (11–0) (53½)	Nebraska (13–0) (32)	1.
2.	Penn State (9)	Penn State (0–0) (13)	Penn State (1–0) (12)	Penn State (2–0) (14)	Penn State (3–0) (14)	Penn State (3–0) (13)	Penn State (4–0) (11)	Nebraska (5–0) (9)	Penn State (6–0) (29)	Penn State (6–0) (20)	Florida State (8–0) (2)	Michigan (9–0) (20)	Michigan (10–0) (20)	Nebraska (10–0) (16)	Nebraska (11–0) (4)	Nebraska (12–0) (8½)	Michigan (12–0) (30)	2.
3.	Washington (15)	Tennessee (1–0) (10)	Washington (1–0) (13)	Washington (2–0) (12)	Nebraska (3–0) (3)	Nebraska (3–0) (3)	Nebraska (4–0) (2)	Florida State (5–0) (1)	Florida State (6–0) (3)	Florida State (7–0) (3)	Penn State (7–0) (8)	Nebraska (9–0) (16)	Nebraska (10–0) (13)	Tennessee (9–1)	Tennessee (10–1)	Tennessee (11–1)	Florida State (11–1)	3.
4.	Florida State (3)	Washington (0–0) (7)	Tennessee (2–0) (5)	Tennessee (2–0) (6)	Florida State (3–0) (1)	Florida State (3–0)	Florida State (4–0)	North Carolina (6–0) (1)	North Carolina (7–0) (1)	Michigan (7–0) (2)	Michigan (8–0) (2)	Ohio State (9–1)	Ohio State (10–1)	Penn State (9–1)	Florida State (10–1)	Florida State (10–1)	North Carolina (11–1)	4.
5.	Tennessee (8)	Florida State (0–0) (3)	Nebraska (1–0) (2)	Florida State (2–0) (2)	North Carolina (3–0) (1)	North Carolina (4–0) (1)	North Carolina (5–0) (1)	Michigan (5–0)	Michigan (6–0) (1)	North Carolina (7–0)	North Carolina (8–0)	Tennessee (7–1)	Tennessee (8–1)	Florida State (10–1)	North Carolina (10–1)	North Carolina (10–1)	UCLA (10–2)	5.
6.	Nebraska (4)	Nebraska (1–0) (2)	Florida State (1–0) (3)	Nebraska (2–0) (1)	Michigan (2–0)	Michigan (3–0)	Michigan (4–0)	Florida (6–1)	Florida (6–1)	Florida (6–1)	Washington (7–1)	Penn State (7–1)	Penn State (8–1)	North Carolina (10–1)	UCLA (9–2)	UCLA (9–2)	Florida (10–2)	6.
7.	Colorado (3)	Colorado (0–0) (1)	Colorado (1–0) (1)	North Carolina (2–0) (1)	Ohio State (3–0)	Ohio State (4–0)	Ohio State (5–0)	Auburn (6–0)	Washington (5–1)	Washington (6–1)	Tennessee (6–1)	Georgia (7–1)	Kansas State (9–1)	UCLA (9–2)	Washington State (10–1)	Washington State (10–1)	Kansas State (11–1)	7.
8.	North Carolina (1)	North Carolina (0–0) (1)	North Carolina (1–0) (1)	Ohio State (2–0) (1)	Auburn (3–0)	Iowa (4–0)	Auburn (5–0)	Washington (4–1)	Tennessee (5–1)	Tennessee (5–1)	Ohio State (8–1)	Kansas State (8–1)	North Carolina (9–1)	Florida (9–2)	Florida (9–2)	Florida (9–2)	Tennessee (11–2)	8.
9.	Ohio State	Ohio State (1–0)	Ohio State (1–0)	Michigan (1–0)	Iowa (3–0)	Auburn (4–0)	Washington (3–1)	Tennessee (4–1)	Ohio State (6–1)	Ohio State (7–1)	Georgia (7–1)	North Carolina (8–1)	UCLA (8–2)	Kansas State (10–1)	Kansas State (10–1)	Kansas State (10–1)	Washington State (10–2)	9.
10.	Texas	Texas (0–0)	Texas (1–0)	LSU (2–0)	Tennessee (2–1)	Tennessee (2–1)	Tennessee (3–1)	LSU (5–1)	Washington State (6–0)	Washington State (7–0)	Kansas State (7–1)	UCLA (7–2)	Florida (8–2)	Washington State (10–1)	Ohio State (10–2)	Ohio State (10–2)	Georgia (10–2)	10.
11.	LSU	LSU (0–0)	LSU (1–0)	Alabama (2–0)	Washington (2–1)	Washington (2–1)	Michigan State (4–0)	Michigan State (5–0)	Auburn (6–1)	Auburn (7–1)	UCLA (7–2)	LSU (7–2)	Washington State (9–1)	Ohio State (10–2)	Auburn (9–2)	Georgia (9–2)	Auburn (10–3)	11.
12.	Notre Dame	Miami (FL) (1–0)	Miami (FL) (1–0)	Auburn (2–0)	Virginia Tech (3–0)	Virginia Tech (4–0)	Washington State (5–0)	Ohio State (5–1)	Oklahoma State (6–0)	Kansas State (6–1)	LSU (6–2)	Florida (7–2)	Arizona State (8–2)	Arizona State (8–2)	Penn State (9–2)	Penn State (9–2)	Ohio State (10–3)	12.
13.	Michigan	Notre Dame (0–0)	Michigan (0–0)	Iowa (2–0)	Michigan State (3–0)	Michigan State (3–0)	Texas A&M (4–0)	Washington State (5–0)	Kansas State (5–1)	UCLA (6–2)	Florida (6–2)	Washington State (8–1)	Auburn (8–2)	Auburn (9–2)	Georgia (9–2)	Auburn (9–3)	LSU (9–3)	13.
14.	Miami (FL)	Michigan (0–0)	Alabama (1–0)	Virginia Tech (2–0)	Washington State (3–0)	LSU (3–1)	LSU (4–1)	Texas A&M (5–0)	Michigan State (5–1)	LSU (5–2)	Iowa (6–2)	Washington (7–2)	Georgia (7–2)	Georgia (8–2)	Texas A&M (9–2)	Syracuse (9–3)	Arizona State (9–3)	14.
15.	Alabama	Alabama (1–0)	Notre Dame (1–0)	Clemson (2–0)	LSU (2–1)	Washington State (4–0)	Georgia (4–0)	Iowa (4–1)	LSU (5–2)	Georgia (6–1)	Washington State (7–1)	Arizona State (7–2)	Virginia Tech (7–2)	Texas A&M (8–2)	Syracuse (9–3)	LSU (8–3)	Purdue (9–3)	15.
16.	Syracuse	BYU (0–0)	Auburn (1–0)	Colorado (1–1)	Colorado (1–1)	Kansas State (3–0)	Iowa (4–1)	Oklahoma State (6–0)	UCLA (5–2)	Iowa (5–2)	Arizona State (6–2)	Auburn (7–2)	Texas A&M (8–2)	Syracuse (8–3)	LSU (8–3)	Purdue (8–3)	Colorado State (11–2)	16.
17.	BYU	Stanford (0–0)	Iowa (1–0)	Arizona State (2–0)	Kansas State (2–0)	Texas A&M (3–0)	Stanford (4–1)	Air Force (7–0)	Virginia Tech (5–1)	West Virginia (6–1)	Auburn (7–2)	Virginia Tech (7–2)	Syracuse (8–3)	LSU (7–3)	Purdue (8–3)	Colorado State (10–2)	Penn State (9–3)	17.
18.	Stanford	Auburn (0–0)	Stanford (1–0)	Michigan State (2–0)	Texas A&M (2–0)	Colorado (2–1)	Air Force (6–0)	UCLA (4–2)	Georgia (5–1)	Purdue (6–1)	Virginia Tech (6–2)	Texas A&M (7–2)	LSU (7–3)	Purdue (8–3)	Colorado State (9–2)	Arizona State (8–3)	Washington (8–4)	18.
19.	Auburn	Iowa (0–0)	Virginia Tech (1–0)	Kansas State (2–0)	Alabama (2–1)	Georgia (3–0)	UCLA (3–2)	Virginia Tech (5–1)	Iowa (4–2)	Oklahoma State (6–1)	Syracuse (6–3)	Syracuse (7–3)	Mississippi State (7–2)	Colorado State (9–2)	Arizona State (8–3)	Texas A&M (9–3)	Southern Miss (9–3)	19.
20.	Iowa	Clemson (0–0)	Kansas State (1–0)	Washington State (2–0)	Georgia (3–0)	Alabama (3–1)	Oklahoma State (5–0) т	Kansas State (4–1)	West Virginia (5–1)	Michigan State (5–2)	Toledo (8–0)	Purdue (7–2)	Washington (7–3)	Missouri (7–4)	Missouri (7–4)	Missouri (7–4)	Syracuse (9–4)	20.
21.	Clemson	USC (0–0)	Clemson (1–0)	Miami (FL) (1–1)	Clemson (2–1)	Stanford (3–1)	Virginia Tech (4–1) т	Georgia (4–1)	Texas A&M (5–1)	Arizona State (5–2)	Texas A&M (6–2)	Oklahoma State (7–2)	West Virginia (7–2)	Virginia Tech (7–3)	Air Force (10–2)	Air Force (10–2)	Texas A&M (9–4)	21.
22.	USC	Virginia Tech (1–0)	USC (0–1)	Texas A&M (1–0)	Stanford (2–1)	Arizona State (3–1)	BYU (3–1)	West Virginia (5–1)	Arizona State (5–2)	Virginia Tech (5–2)	West Virginia (6–2)	Iowa (6–3)	Colorado State (8–2)	Washington (7–4)	Washington (7–4)	Southern Miss (8–3)	Mississippi (8–4)	22.
23.	Kansas State	Kansas State (0–0)	Michigan State (1–0)	Stanford (1–1)	Arizona State (2–1)	Air Force (5–0)	Kansas State (3–1)	Stanford (4–2)	Purdue (5–1)	Toledo (7–0)	Oklahoma State (6–2)	West Virginia (6–2)	Missouri (7–4)	Air Force (10–2)	Southern Miss (8–3)	Washington (7–4)	Missouri (7–5)	23.
24.	Wisconsin	Northwestern (1–0)	West Virginia (2–0)	Texas (1–1)	BYU (1–1)	BYU (2–1)	West Virginia (4–1)	Wisconsin (6–1)	Air Force (7–1)	Syracuse (5–3)	Purdue (6–2)	Wisconsin (8–2)	Wisconsin (8–3)	Southern Miss (8–3)	Oklahoma State (8–3)	Oklahoma State (8–3)	Oklahoma State (8–4)	24.
25.	Virginia Tech	Colorado State (1–0)	NC State (2–0)	Georgia (2–0)	Air Force (4–0)	UCLA (2–2)	Colorado (2–2)	Georgia Tech (4–1)	Syracuse (5–3)	BYU (5–2)	Southern Miss (6–2)	Mississippi State (6–2)	Purdue (7–3)	Oklahoma State (8–3)	New Mexico (9–2)	Michigan State (7–4)	Air Force (10–3)	25.
	Preseason Aug 11	Week 2 Sep 2	Week 3 Sep 8	Week 4 Sep 15	Week 5 Sep 22	Week 6 Sep 29	Week 7 Oct 6	Week 8 Oct 13	Week 9 Oct 20	Week 10 Oct 27	Week 11 Nov 3	Week 12 Nov 10	Week 13 Nov 17	Week 14 Nov 24	Week 15 Dec 1	Week 16 Dec 8	Week 17 (Final) Jan 4	
		Dropped: Syracuse; Wisconsin	Dropped: BYU; Northwestern; Colorado State	Dropped: Notre Dame; USC; West Virginia; NC State	Dropped: Miami (FL); Texas	Dropped: Clemson	Dropped: Alabama; Arizona State	Dropped: BYU; Colorado	Dropped: Stanford; Wisconsin; Georgia Tech	Dropped: Texas A&M; Air Force	Dropped: Michigan State; BYU	Dropped: Toledo; Southern Miss	Dropped: Oklahoma State; Iowa	Dropped: Mississippi State; West Virginia; Wisconsin	Dropped: Virginia Tech	Dropped: New Mexico	Dropped: Michigan State	
