= 1997 NFL draft =

National Football League draft

General information
- Date: April 19–20, 1997
- Location: Paramount Theatre at MSG in New York City, New York
- Network: ESPN

Overview
- 240 total selections in 7 rounds
- League: National Football League
- First selection: Orlando Pace, OT; St. Louis Rams
- Mr. Irrelevant: Ronnie McAda, QB; Green Bay Packers
- Most selections (14): Miami Dolphins
- Fewest selections (3): Denver Broncos; San Francisco 49ers
- Hall of Famers: 5: OT Orlando Pace; OT Walter Jones; TE Tony Gonzalez; CB Ronde Barber; DE Jason Taylor

The 1997 NFL draft was the procedure by which National Football League teams selected amateur college football players. It is officially known as the NFL Annual Player Selection Meeting. The draft was held April 19–20, 1997, at the Paramount Theatre at Madison Square Garden in New York City, New York. No teams chose to claim any players in the supplemental draft that year.

This draft was notable for its high-profile offensive linemen. The first overall selection was Orlando Pace, who appeared in seven consecutive Pro Bowls from 2000 to 2006 and was inducted to the Hall of Fame in 2016. Tarik Glenn was selected 19th overall and was also named to three Pro Bowls. Walter Jones, who made nine Pro Bowls (including eight consecutive from 2001 to 2008), was a seven time All-Pro and was inducted to the Hall of Fame in 2014, was selected sixth overall. Others include Chris Naeole, Dan Neil, Ryan Tucker, Jeff Mitchell, Mike Flynn and Joe Andruzzi.

The 1997 draft is also known for its running backs. Warrick Dunn, Corey Dillon and Tiki Barber each rushed for over 10,000 yards in their careers, and Antowain Smith and Duce Staley all enjoyed productive seasons in the NFL. This draft is also well known for its undrafted Pro Bowl players, including Jake Delhomme, Priest Holmes and Pat Williams.

== Player selections ==
*	Compensatory selection
†	Pro Bowler (Note: Players are identified as a Pro Bowler if they were selected for the Pro Bowl at any time in their career.)
‡	Hall of Famer

Positions key
Offense	Defense	Special teams
QB — Quarterback; RB — Running back; FB — Fullback; WR — Wide receiver; TE — Tight end; OL — Offensive lineman; T — Tackle; G — Guard; C — Center	DL — Defensive lineman; DT — Defensive tackle (Note: Includes nose tackle (NT)); DE — Defensive end; EDGE — Edge rusher; LB — Linebacker (Note: Includes middle linebacker (MLB/MIKE), weakside linebacker (WILL), strongside linebacker (SAM), off-ball linebacker, and outside linebacker (OLB)); DB — Defensive back; CB — Cornerback; S — Safety (Note: Includes free safety (FS) and strong safety (SS))	K — Kicker (Note: Also known as a placekicker (PK)); P — Punter; LS — Long snapper; RS — Return specialist (Note: Includes kickoff and punt returners)

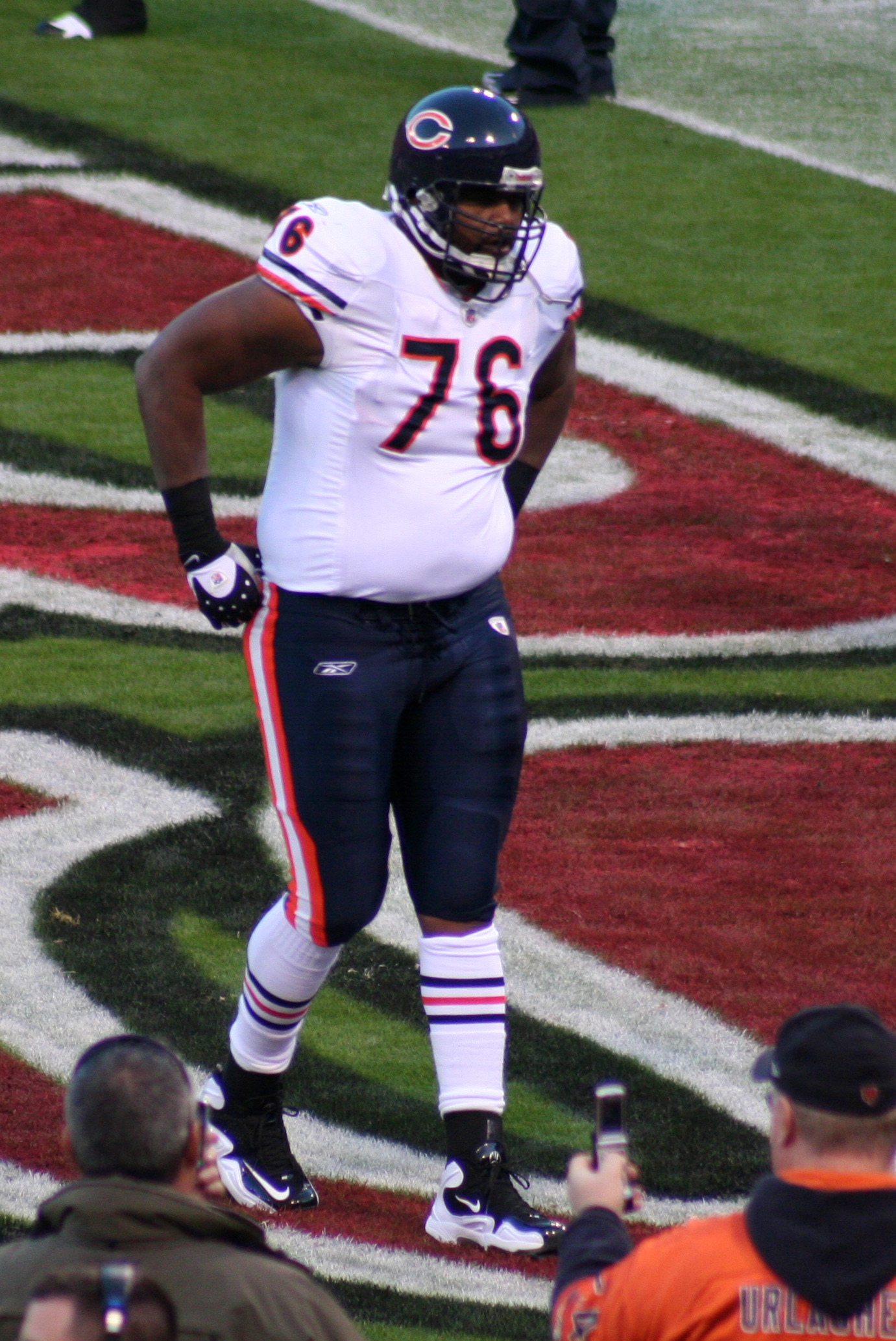
First-overall pick Orlando Pace, helped the St. Louis Rams to a Super Bowl Championship, was named to seven Pro Bowls and four All-Pro teams, and broke several franchise and NFL records for yards gained.

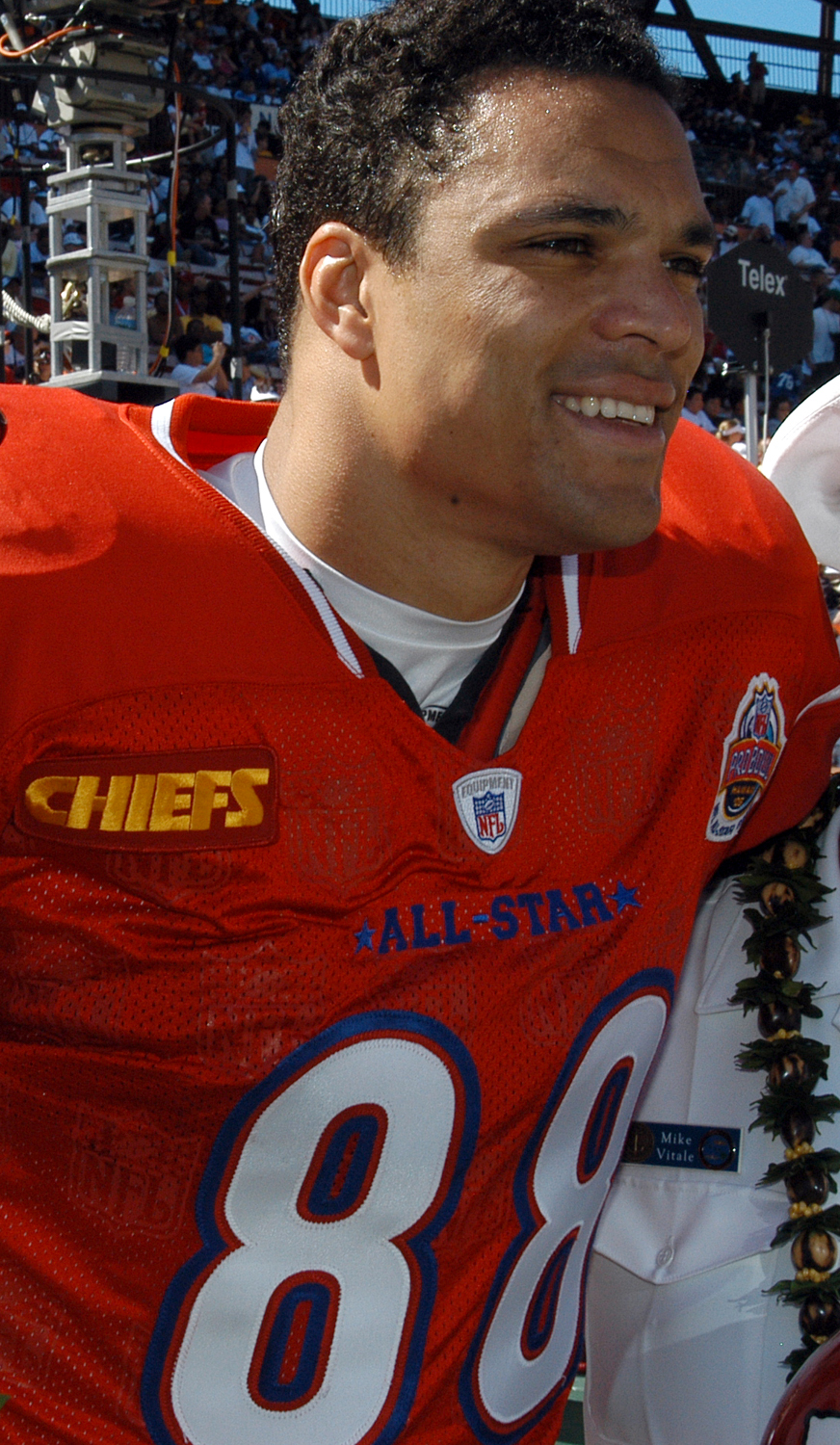
Considered by some to be the best tight end in NFL history, Tony Gonzalez was named to 14 Pro Bowls and 10 All-Pros, led the league in receptions in 2004 and holds multiple tight-end receiving records

Rnd.	Pick	Team	Player	Pos.	College	Notes
1	1	St. Louis Rams	Orlando Pace^{‡}^{†}	T	Ohio State	from NY Jets (Note: No. 1: NY Jets → St. Louis (PD). The NY Jets traded a first-round selection (1st overall) to St. Louis in exchange for first-, third-, fourth- and seventh-round selections (6th, 67th, 102nd and 207th overall).)
1	2	Oakland Raiders	Darrell Russell ^{†}	DT	USC	from New Orleans (Note: No. 2: New Orleans → Oakland (PD). New Orleans traded first- and sixth-round selections (2nd and 166th overall) to Oakland in exchange for first-, second- and fourth-round selections (10th, 39th and 107th overall) and WR Daryl Hobbs.)
1	3	Seattle Seahawks	Shawn Springs ^{†}	CB	Ohio State	from Atlanta (Note: No. 3: Atlanta → Seattle (PD). Atlanta traded first- and third-round selections (3rd and 63rd overall) to Seattle in exchange for first-, second-, third- and fourth-round selections (11th, 41st, 70th and 100th overall).)
1	4	Baltimore Ravens	Peter Boulware ^{†}	LB	Florida State	
1	5	Detroit Lions	Bryant Westbrook	CB	Texas	
1	6	Seattle Seahawks	Walter Jones^{‡}^{†}	T	Florida State	from St. Louis via NY Jets and Tampa Bay (Note: No. 6: St. Louis → NY Jets → Tampa Bay → Seattle. Multiple trades: St. Louis → NY Jets (PD). See Round 1: NY Jets → St. Louis. NY Jets → Tampa Bay (PD). The NY Jets traded a first-round selection (6th overall) to Tampa Bay in exchange for first- and fourth-round selections (8th and 104th overall). Tampa Bay → Seattle (D). Tampa Bay traded a first-round selection (6th overall) to Seattle in exchange for first- and third-round selections (12th and 63rd overall).)
1	7	New York Giants	Ike Hilliard	WR	Florida	
1	8	New York Jets	James Farrior ^{†}	LB	Virginia	from Tampa Bay (Note: No. 8: Tampa Bay → NY Jets (D). See Round 1: NY Jets → Tampa Bay.)
1	9	Arizona Cardinals	Tom Knight	CB	Iowa	
1	10	New Orleans Saints	Chris Naeole	G	Colorado	from Oakland (Note: No. 10: Oakland → New Orleans (PD). See Round 1: New Orleans → Oakland.)
1	11	Atlanta Falcons	Michael Booker	CB	Nebraska	from Chicago via Seattle (Note: No. 11: Chicago → Seattle → Atlanta. Multiple trades: Chicago → Seattle (PD). Chicago traded a first-round selection (11th overall) to Seattle in exchange for a fourth-round selection (105th overall) and QB Rick Mirer. Seattle → Atlanta (PD). See Round 1: Atlanta → Seattle.)
1	12	Tampa Bay Buccaneers	Warrick Dunn ^{†}	RB	Florida State	from Seattle (Note: No. 12: Seattle → Tampa Bay (D). See Round 1: Tampa Bay → Seattle.)
1	13	Kansas City Chiefs	Tony Gonzalez^{‡}^{†}	TE	California	from Tennessee (Note: No. 13: Tennessee → Kansas City (D). Tennessee traded first- and fourth-round selections (13th and 110th overall) to Kansas City in exchange for first-, third-, fourth- and sixth-round selections (18th, 81st, 116th and 181st overall).)
1	14	Cincinnati Bengals	Reinard Wilson	LB	Florida State	
1	15	Miami Dolphins	Yatil Green	WR	Miami (FL)	
1	16	Tampa Bay Buccaneers	Reidel Anthony	WR	Florida	from San Diego (Note: No. 16: San Diego → Tampa Bay (PD). San Diego traded a first-round selection (16th overall) to Tampa Bay in exchange for a 1996 second-round selection.)
1	17	Washington Redskins	Kenard Lang	DE	Miami (FL)	
1	18	Tennessee Oilers	Kenny Holmes	DE	Miami (FL)	from Kansas City (Note: No. 18: Kansas City → Tennessee (D). See Round 1: Tennessee → Kansas City.)
1	19	Indianapolis Colts	Tarik Glenn ^{†}	T	California	
1	20	Minnesota Vikings	Dwayne Rudd	LB	Alabama	
1	21	Jacksonville Jaguars	Renaldo Wynn	DT	Notre Dame	
1	22	Dallas Cowboys	David LaFleur	TE	LSU	from Philadelphia (Note: No. 22: Philadelphia → Dallas (D). Philadelphia traded a first-round selection (22nd overall) to Dallas in exchange for first- and fifth-round selections (25th and 155th overall) and a 1998 third-round selection.)
1	23	Buffalo Bills	Antowain Smith	RB	Houston	
1	24	Pittsburgh Steelers	Chad Scott	CB	Maryland	
1	25	Philadelphia Eagles	Jon Harris	DE	Virginia	from Dallas (Note: No. 25: Philadelphia → Dallas (D). See Round 1: Philadelphia → Dallas.)
1	26	San Francisco 49ers	Jim Druckenmiller	QB	Virginia Tech	
1	27	Carolina Panthers	Rae Carruth	WR	Colorado	
1	28	Denver Broncos	Trevor Pryce ^{†}	DT	Clemson	
1	29	New England Patriots	Chris Canty	CB	Kansas State	
1	30	Green Bay Packers	Ross Verba	T	Iowa	
2	31	New York Jets	Rick Terry	DT	North Carolina	
2	32	Atlanta Falcons	Nathan Davis	DE	Indiana	
2	33	New Orleans Saints	Rob Kelly	S	Ohio State	
2	34	Baltimore Ravens	Jamie Sharper	LB	Virginia	
2	35	Detroit Lions	Juan Roque	T	Arizona State	
2	36	New York Giants	Tiki Barber ^{†}	RB	Virginia	
2	37	Tampa Bay Buccaneers	Jerry Wunsch	T	Wisconsin	
2	38	Chicago Bears	John Allred	TE	USC	from St. Louis (Note: No. 38: St. Louis → Chicago (D). St. Louis traded a second-round selection (38th overall) to Chicago in exchange for second- and sixth-round selections (40th and 173rd overall).)
2	39	New Orleans Saints	Jared Tomich	DE	Nebraska	from Oakland (Note: No. 39: Oakland → New Orleans (PD). See Round 1: New Orleans → Oakland.)
2	40	St. Louis Rams	Dexter McCleon	CB	Clemson	from Chicago (Note: No. 40: Chicago → St. Louis (D). See Round 2: St. Louis → Chicago.)
2	41	Atlanta Falcons	Byron Hanspard	RB	Texas Tech	from Seattle (Note: No. 41: Seattle → New Atlanta (PD). See Round 1: Atlanta → Seattle.)
2	42	Arizona Cardinals	Jake Plummer ^{†}	QB	Arizona State	
2	43	Cincinnati Bengals	Corey Dillon ^{†}	RB	Washington	
2	44	Miami Dolphins	Sam Madison ^{†}	CB	Louisville	
2	45	San Diego Chargers	Freddie Jones	TE	North Carolina	
2	46	Tennessee Oilers	Joey Kent	WR	Tennessee	
2	47	Kansas City Chiefs	Kevin Lockett	WR	Kansas State	
2	48	Indianapolis Colts	Adam Meadows	T	Georgia	
2	49	Minnesota Vikings	Torrian Gray	S	Virginia Tech	
2	50	Jacksonville Jaguars	Mike Logan	CB	West Virginia	
2	51	Washington Redskins	Greg Jones	LB	Colorado	
2	52	Buffalo Bills	Marcellus Wiley ^{†}	DE	Columbia	
2	53	Pittsburgh Steelers	Will Blackwell	WR	San Diego State	
2	54	Detroit Lions	Kevin Abrams	CB	Syracuse	from Dallas (Note: No. 54: Dallas → Detroit (D). Dallas traded a second-round selection (54th overall) to Detroit in exchange for third- and fourth-round selections (65th and 101st overall).)
2	55	San Francisco 49ers	Marc Edwards	FB	Notre Dame	from Philadelphia (Note: No. 55: Philadelphia → San Francisco (D). Philadelphia traded a second-round selection (55th overall) to San Francisco in exchange for second-, sixth- and seventh-round selections (57th, 190th and 227nd overall).)
2	56	Carolina Panthers	Mike Minter	S	Nebraska	
2	57	Philadelphia Eagles	James Darling	LB	Washington State	from San Francisco (Note: No. 57: San Francisco → Philadelphia (D). See Round 2: Philadelphia → San Francisco.)
2	58	Baltimore Ravens	Kim Herring	S	Penn State	from Denver (Note: No. 58: Denver → Baltimore (PD). Denver traded a second-round selection (58th overall) to Baltimore in exchange for OT Tony Jones.)
2	59	New England Patriots	Brandon Mitchell	DE	Texas A&M	
2	60	Green Bay Packers	Darren Sharper ^{†}	S	William & Mary	
3	61	New England Patriots	Sedrick Shaw	RB	Iowa	from NY Jets (Note: No. 61: NY Jets → New England (PD). The NY Jets traded second- and third-round selections (61st and 97th overall), a 1998 second-round selection and a 1999 first-round selection to New England as compensation for hiring Bill Parcells as head coach.)
3	62	New Orleans Saints	Troy Davis	RB	Iowa State	
3	63	Tampa Bay Buccaneers	Frank Middleton	G	Arizona	from Atlanta via Seattle (Note: No. 63: Atlanta → Seattle → Tampa Bay. Multiple trades: Atlanta → Seattle (PD). See Round 1: Atlanta → Seattle. Seattle → Tampa Bay (D). See Round 1: Seattle → Tampa Bay.)
3	64	Baltimore Ravens	Jay Graham	RB	Tennessee	
3	65	Dallas Cowboys	Dexter Coakley ^{†}	LB	Appalachian State	from Detroit (Note: No. 65: Detroit → Dallas (D). See Round 2: Dallas → Detroit.)
3	66	Tampa Bay Buccaneers	Ronde Barber^{‡}^{†}	CB	Virginia	
3	67	Denver Broncos	Dan Neil	G	Texas	from St. Louis via NY Jets (Note: No. 67: St. Louis → NY Jets → Denver. Multiple trades: St. Louis → NY Jets (PD). See Round 1: NY Jets → St. Louis. NY Jets → Denver (D). The NY Jets traded a third-round selection (67th overall) to Denver in exchange for third-, sixth- and seventh-round selections (88th, 191st and 229th overall) and a 1998 sixth-round selection.)
3	68	New York Giants	Ryan Phillips	LB	Idaho	
3	69	Chicago Bears	Bob Sapp	G	Washington	
3	70	Atlanta Falcons	OJ Santiago	TE	Kent State	from Seattle (Note: No. 70: Seattle → Atlanta (PD). See Round 1: Atlanta → Seattle.)
3	71	Philadelphia Eagles	Duce Staley	RB	South Carolina	from Arizona (Note: No. 71: Arizona → Philadelphia (D). Arizona traded a third-round selection (71st overall) to Philadelphia in exchange for third- and sixth-round selections (84th and 188th overall).)
3	72	Oakland Raiders	Adam Treu	G	Nebraska	
3	73	Miami Dolphins	Jason Taylor^{‡}^{†}	DE	Akron	
3	74	San Diego Chargers	Michael Hamilton	LB	North Carolina A&T	
3	75	Tennessee Oilers	Denard Walker	CB	Kent State	
3	76	Cincinnati Bengals	Rod Payne	C	Michigan	
3	77	San Francisco 49ers	Greg Clark	TE	Stanford	from Indianapolis (Note: No. 77: Indianapolis → San Francisco (D). Indianapolis traded a third-round selection (77th overall) to San Francisco in exchange for third- and fifth-round selections (86th and 156th overall).)
3	78	Minnesota Vikings	Stalin Colinet	DE	Boston College	
3	79	Jacksonville Jaguars	James Hamilton	LB	North Carolina	
3	80	Washington Redskins	Derek Smith	LB	Arizona State	
3	81	Tennessee Oilers	Scott Sanderson	T	Washington State	from Kansas City (Note: No. 81: Kansas City → Tennessee (D). See Round 1: Tennessee → Kansas City.)
3	82	Pittsburgh Steelers	Paul Wiggins	T	Oregon	
3	83	Dallas Cowboys	Steve Scifres	G	Wyoming	
3	84	Arizona Cardinals	Ty Howard	CB	Ohio State	from Philadelphia (Note: No. 84: Philadelphia → Arizona (D). See Round 3: Arizona → Philadelphia.)
3	85	Oakland Raiders	Tim Kohn	G	Iowa State	from Buffalo (Note: No. 85: Buffalo → Oakland (PD). Buffalo traded a third-round selection (85th overall) to Oakland in exchange for QB Billy Joe Hobert.)
3	86	Indianapolis Colts	Bertrand Berry ^{†}	LB	Notre Dame	from San Francisco (Note: No. 86: Indianapolis → San Francisco (D). See Round 3: Indianapolis → San Francisco.)
3	87	Carolina Panthers	Kinnon Tatum	LB	Notre Dame	
3	88	New York Jets	Dedric Ward	WR	Northern Iowa	from Denver (Note: No. 88: NY Jets → Denver (D). See Round 3: NY Jets → Denver.)
3	89	New England Patriots	Chris Carter	S	Texas	
3	90	Green Bay Packers	Brett Conway	K	Penn State	
3*	91	Pittsburgh Steelers	Mike Vrabel ^{†}	LB	Ohio State	
3*	92	Miami Dolphins	Derrick Rodgers	LB	Arizona State	
3*	93	Miami Dolphins	Ronnie Ward	LB	Kansas	
3*	94	Dallas Cowboys	Kenny Wheaton	CB	Oregon	
3*	95	New York Giants	Brad Maynard	P	Ball State	
3*	96	Miami Dolphins	Brent Smith	T	Mississippi State	
4	97	New England Patriots	Damon Denson	G	Michigan	from NY Jets (Note: No. 97: NY Jets → New England (PD). See Round 3: NY Jets → New England.)
4	98	Tennessee Oilers	Derrick Mason ^{†}	WR	Michigan State	from Atlanta (Note: No. 98: Atlanta → Tennessee (PD). Atlanta traded fourth- and sixth-round selections (98th and 165th overall) to Tennessee in exchange for QB Chris Chandler.)
4	99	New Orleans Saints	Danny Wuerffel	QB	Florida	
4	100	Atlanta Falcons	Henri Crockett	LB	Florida State	from Baltimore via Seattle (Note: No. 100: Baltimore → Seattle → Atlanta. Multiple trades: Baltimore → Seattle (PD). Baltimore traded a fourth-round selection (100th overall) to Seattle in exchange for G Jeff Blackshear. Seattle → Atlanta (PD). See Round 1: Atlanta → Seattle.)
4	101	Dallas Cowboys	Antonio Anderson	DT	Syracuse	from Detroit (Note: No. 101: Detroit → Dallas (D). See Round 2: Dallas → Detroit.)
4	102	New York Jets	Terry Day	DE	Mississippi State	from St. Louis (Note: No. 102: St. Louis → NY Jets (PD). See Round 1: NY Jets → St. Louis.)
4	103	New York Giants	Pete Monty	LB	Wisconsin	
4	104	New York Jets	Leon Johnson	RB	North Carolina	from Tampa Bay (Note: No. 104: Tampa Bay → NY Jets (D). See Round 1: NY Jets → Tampa Bay.)
4	105	Chicago Bears	Darnell Autry	RB	Northwestern	from Seattle (Note: No. 105: Seattle → Chicago (PD). See Round 1: Chicago → Seattle.)
4	106	Arizona Cardinals	Chris Dishman	G	Nebraska	
4	107	Tennessee Oilers	Pratt Lyons	DE	Troy State	from Oakland via New Orleans (Note: No. 107: Oakland → New Orleans → Tennessee. Multiple trades: Oakland → New Orleans (PD). See Round 1: New Orleans → Oakland. New Orleans → Tennessee (D). New Orleans traded a fourth-round selection (107th overall) to Tennessee in exchange for fourth- and sixth-round selections (116th and 165th overall).)
4	108	Chicago Bears	Marcus Robinson	WR	South Carolina	
4	109	San Diego Chargers	Raleigh Roundtree	G	South Carolina State	
4	110	Kansas City Chiefs	Pat Barnes	QB	California	from Kansas City (Note: No. 110: Tennessee → Kansas City (D). See Round 1: Tennessee → Kansas City.)
4	111	Cincinnati Bengals	Tremain Mack ^{†}	S	Miami (FL)	
4	112	St. Louis Rams	Ryan Tucker	T	TCU	from Miami (Note: No. 112: Miami → St. Louis (D). Miami traded a fourth-round selection (112th overall) to St. Louis in exchange for a fourth-round selection and two sixth-round selections (121st, 170th and 173rd overall).)
4	113	Minnesota Vikings	Antonio Banks	CB	Virginia Tech	
4	114	Jacksonville Jaguars	Seth Payne	DT	Cornell	
4	115	Washington Redskins	Albert Connell	WR	Texas A&M	
4	116	New Orleans Saints	Keith Poole	WR	Arizona State	from Kansas City via Tennessee (Note: No. 116: Kansas City → Tennessee → New Orleans. Multiple trades: Kansas City → Tennessee (D). See Round 1: Tennessee → Kansas City. Tennessee → New Orleans (D). See Round 4: New Orleans → Tennessee.)
4	117	Indianapolis Colts	Monty Montgomery	CB	Houston	
4	118	Baltimore Ravens	Tyrus McCloud	LB	Louisville	from Dallas (Note: No. 118: Dallas → Baltimore (D). Dallas traded a fourth-round selection (118th overall) to Baltimore in exchange for a 1996 fifth-round selection.)
4	119	Philadelphia Eagles	Damien Robinson	S	Iowa	
4	120	Buffalo Bills	Jamie Nails	G	Florida A&M	
4	121	Miami Dolphins	Jerome Daniels	T	Northeastern	from Pittsburgh via St. Louis (Note: No. 121: Pittsburgh → St. Louis → Miami. Multiple trades: Pittsburgh → St. Louis (PD). Pittsburgh traded a fourth-round selection (121st overall) and a 1996 second-round selection to St. Louis in exchange for a 1996 third-round selection and RB Jerome Bettis. St. Louis → Miami (D). See Round 4: Miami → St. Louis.)
4	122	Carolina Panthers	Tarek Saleh	LB	Wisconsin	
4	123	Oakland Raiders	Chad Levitt	RB	Cornell	from San Francisco via Miami (Note: No. 123: San Francisco → Miami → Oakland. Multiple trades: San Francisco → Miami (PD). San Francisco traded a fourth-round selection (123rd overall) to Miami in exchange for RB Terry Kirby. Miami → Oakland (D). Miami traded a fourth-round selection (123rd overall) to Oakland in exchange for fifth-, sixth- and seventh-round selections (157th, 166th and 203rd overall).)
4	124	Denver Broncos	Cory Gilliard	CB	Ball State	
4	125	New England Patriots	Ed Ellis	T	Buffalo	
4	126	Green Bay Packers	Jermaine Smith	DT	Georgia	
4*	127	Dallas Cowboys	Macey Brooks	WR	James Madison	
4*	128	Tampa Bay Buccaneers	Alshermond Singleton	LB	Temple	
4*	129	Dallas Cowboys	Nicky Sualua	FB	Ohio State	
4*	130	Detroit Lions	Matt Russell	LB	Colorado	
5	131	New York Jets	Lamont Burns	G	East Carolina	
5	132	Washington Redskins	Jamel Williams	S	Nebraska	from New Orleans (Note: No. 132: New Orleans → Washington (PD). New Orleans traded a fifth-round selection (132nd overall) to Washington in exchange for QB Heath Shuler.)
5	133	Atlanta Falcons	Marcus Wimberly	S	Miami (FL)	
5	134	Baltimore Ravens	Jeff Mitchell	C	Florida	
5	135	Detroit Lions	Pete Chryplewicz	TE	Notre Dame	
5	136	New York Giants	Sam Garnes	S	Cincinnati	
5	137	Tampa Bay Buccaneers	Patrick Hape	TE	Alabama	
5	138	San Diego Chargers	Kenny Bynum	RB	South Carolina State	from St. Louis (Note: No. 138: St. Louis → San Diego (D). St. Louis traded a fifth-round selection (138th overall) to San Diego in exchange for a seventh-round selection (215th overall) and a 1998 fourth-round selection.)
5	139	Arizona Cardinals	Chad Carpenter	WR	Washington State	
5	140	Washington Redskins	Keith Thibodeaux	CB	Northwestern State	from Oakland via Atlanta (Note: No. 140: Oakland → Atlanta → Washington. Multiple trades: Oakland → Atlanta (PD). Oakland traded a fifth-round selection (140th overall) to Atlanta in exchange for OT Lincoln Kennedy. Atlanta → Washington (D). Atlanta traded a fifth-round selection (140th overall) to Washington in exchange for sixth- and seventh-round selections (180th and 222nd overall).)
5	141	Chicago Bears	Van Hiles	CB	Kentucky	
5	142	Seattle Seahawks	Eric Stokes	CB	Nebraska	
5	143	Tennessee Oilers	George McCullough	CB	Baylor	
5	144	Cincinnati Bengals	Andre Purvis	DT	North Carolina	
5	145	New York Jets	Raymond Austin	CB	Tennessee	from Miami (Note: No. 145: Miami → NY Jets (PD). Miami traded a fifth-round selection (145th overall) to the NY Jets in exchange for OT James Brown.)
5	146	San Diego Chargers	Paul Bradford	CB	Portland State	from San Diego via Pittsburgh (Note: No. 146: San Diego → Pittsburgh → San Diego. Multiple trades: San Diego → Pittsburgh (PD). San Diego traded a fifth-round selection (146th overall) to Pittsburgh in exchange for a seventh-round selection (218th overall) and a 1996 sixth-round selection. Pittsburgh → San Diego (D). Pittsburgh traded a fifth-round selection (146th overall) to San Diego in exchange for a 1998 third-round selection.)
5	147	Jacksonville Jaguars	Damon Jones	TE	Southern Illinois	
5	148	Washington Redskins	Twan Russell	LB	Miami (FL)	
5	149	Miami Dolphins	Barron Tanner	DT	Oklahoma	from Kansas City (Note: No. 149: Kansas City → Miami (PD). Kansas City traded a fifth-round selection (149th overall) to Miami in exchange for K Pete Stoyanovich.)
5	150	Indianapolis Colts	Nate Jacquet	WR	San Diego State	
5	151	Minnesota Vikings	Tony Williams	DT	Memphis	
5	152	Philadelphia Eagles	N. D. Kalu	DE	Rice	
5	153	Buffalo Bills	Sean Woodson	CB	Jackson State	
5	154	Pittsburgh Steelers	George Jones	RB	San Diego State	
5	155	Philadelphia Eagles	Luther Broughton	TE	Furman	from Dallas (Note: No. 155: Philadelphia → Dallas (D). See Round 1: Philadelphia → Dallas.)
5	156	Indianapolis Colts	Carl Powell	DE	Louisville	from San Francisco (Note: No. 156: Indianapolis → San Francisco (D). See Round 3: Indianapolis → San Francisco.)
5	157	Miami Dolphins	Nick Lopez	DE	Texas Southern	from Carolina via Oakland (Note: No. 157: Carolina → Oakland → Miami. Multiple trades: Carolina → Oakland (PD). Carolina traded a fifth-round selection (157th overall) to Oakland in exchange for WR Raghib Ismail. Oakland → Miami (D). See Round 4: Miami → Oakland.)
5	158	St. Louis Rams	Taje Allen	CB	Texas	from Denver (Note: No. 158: Denver → St. Louis (PD). Denver traded a fifth-round selection (158th overall) to St. Louis in exchange for WR Todd Kinchen.)
5	159	New England Patriots	Vernon Crawford	LB	Florida State	
5	160	Green Bay Packers	Anthony Hicks	LB	Middle Tennessee State	
5*	161	Detroit Lions	Duane Ashman	DE	Virginia	
5*	162	Washington Redskins	Brad Badger	G	Stanford	
5*	163	Kansas City Chiefs	June Henley	RB	Kansas	
6	164	New York Jets	Tim Scharf	LB	Northwestern	
6	165	New Orleans Saints	Nicky Savoie	TE	LSU	from Atlanta via Tennessee (Note: No. 165: Atlanta → Tennessee → New Orleans. Multiple trades: Atlanta → Tennessee (PD). See Round 4: Atlanta → Tennessee. Tennessee → New Orleans (D). See Round 4: New Orleans → Tennessee.)
6	166	Miami Dolphins	John Fiala	LB	Washington	from New Orleans via Oakland (Note: No. 166: New Orleans → Oakland → Miami. Multiple trades: New Orleans → Oakland (PD). See Round 1: New Orleans → Oakland. Oakland → Miami (D). See Round 4: Miami → Oakland.)
6	167	Baltimore Ravens	Steve Lee	RB	Indiana	
6	168	Detroit Lions	Troy Ramirez	G	Northern Colorado	
6	169	Tampa Bay Buccaneers	Al Harris ^{†}	CB	Texas A&M–Kingsville	
6	170	Miami Dolphins	Brian Manning	WR	Stanford	from St. Louis (Note: No. 121: St. Louis → Miami (D). See Round 4: Miami → St. Louis.)
6	171	New York Giants	Mike Cherry	QB	Murray State	
6	172	Oakland Raiders	Calvin Branch	RB	Colorado State	
6	173	Miami Dolphins	Mike Crawford	LB	Nevada	from Chicago via St. Louis (Note: No. 173: Chicago → St. Louis → Miami. Multiple trades: Chicago → St. Louis (D). See Round 2: St. Louis → Chicago. St. Louis → Miami (D). See Round 4: Miami → St. Louis.)
6	174	Seattle Seahawks	Itula Mili	TE	BYU	
6	175	Arizona Cardinals	Rod Brown	RB	NC State	
6	176	Cincinnati Bengals	Canute Curtis	LB	West Virginia	
6	177	Miami Dolphins	Ed Perry	TE	James Madison	
6	178	San Diego Chargers	Daniel Palmer	C	Air Force	
6	179	St. Louis Rams	Muadianvita Kazadi	LB	Tulsa	from Tennessee (Note: No. 179: Tennessee → St. Louis (PD). Tennessee traded a sixth-round selection (179th overall) to St. Louis in exchange for DE Robert Young.)
6	180	Atlanta Falcons	Calvin Collins	C	Texas A&M	from Washington (Note: No. 180: Washington → Atlanta (D). See Round 5: Atlanta → Washington.)
6	181	Tennessee Oilers	Dennis Stallings	LB	Illinois	from Kansas City (Note: No. 181: Kansas City → Tennessee (D). See Round 1: Tennessee → Kansas City.)
6	182	Indianapolis Colts	Scott Von der Ahe	LB	Arizona State	
6	183	Minnesota Vikings	Robert Tate	WR	Cincinnati	
6	184	Jacksonville Jaguars	Daimon Shelton	FB	Sacramento State	
6	185	Buffalo Bills	Marcus Spriggs	G	Houston	
6	186	Pittsburgh Steelers	Daryl Porter	S	Houston	
6	187	Dallas Cowboys	Lee Vaughn	CB	Boston College	
6	188	Arizona Cardinals	Tony McCombs	LB	Eastern Kentucky	from Philadelphia (Note: No. 188: Philadelphia → Arizona (D). See Round 3: Arizona → Philadelphia.)
6	189	Carolina Panthers	Matt Finkes	DE	Ohio State	
6	190	Philadelphia Eagles	Antwuan Wyatt	WR	Bethune-Cookman	from San Francisco (Note: No. 190: San Francisco → Philadelphia (D). See Round 2: Philadelphia → San Francisco.)
6	191	New York Jets	Chuck Clements	QB	Houston	from Denver (Note: No. 191: NY Jets → Denver (D). See Round 3: NY Jets → Denver.)
6	192	New England Patriots	Tony Gaiter	WR	Miami (FL)	
6	193	Oakland Raiders	Grady Jackson	DT	Knoxville	from Green Bay (Note: No. 193: Green Bay → Oakland (D). Green Bay traded a sixth-round selection (193rd overall) to Oakland in exchange for a seventh-round selection (213th overall).)
6*	194	Baltimore Ravens	Cornell Brown	DE	Virginia Tech	
6*	195	Kansas City Chiefs	Isaac Byrd	WR	Kansas	
6*	196	Chicago Bears	Shawn Swayda	DT	Arizona State	
6*	197	Tampa Bay Buccaneers	Nigea Carter	WR	Michigan State	
6*	198	Philadelphia Eagles	Ed Jasper	DT	Texas A&M	
6*	199	Pittsburgh Steelers	Rod Manuel	DE	Oklahoma	
6*	200	Chicago Bears	Richard Hogans	LB	Memphis	
6*	201	Chicago Bears	Ricky Parker	CB	San Diego State	
7	202	New York Jets	Steve Rosga	CB	Colorado	
7	203	Miami Dolphins	Hudhaifa Ismaeli	S	Northwestern	from New Orleans via Oakland (Note: No. 203: New Orleans → Oakland → Miami. Multiple trades: New Orleans → Oakland (PD). New Orleans traded a seventh-round selection (203rd overall) to Oakland in exchange for DT Austin Robbins. Oakland → Miami (D). See Round 4: Miami → Oakland.)
7	204	Atlanta Falcons	Tony Graziani	QB	Oregon	
7	205	Baltimore Ravens	Chris Ward	DE	Kentucky	
7	206	Detroit Lions	Terry Battle	RB	Arizona State	
7	207	Philadelphia Eagles	Koy Detmer	QB	Colorado	from St. Louis via NY Jets. (Note: No. 207: St. Louis → NY Jets → Philadelphia. Multiple trades: St. Louis → NY Jets (PD). See Round 1: NY Jets → St. Louis. NY Jets → Philadelphia (PD). The NY Jets traded a seventh-round selection (207th overall) to Philadelphia in exchange for DT Ronnie Dixon.)
7	208	New York Giants	Matt Keneley	DT	USC	
7	209	Tampa Bay Buccaneers	Anthony DeGrate	DT	Stephen F. Austin	
7	210	Chicago Bears	Mike Miano	DT	SW Missouri State	
7	211	Seattle Seahawks	Carlos Jones	CB	Miami (FL)	
7	212	Arizona Cardinals	Mark Smith	DE	Auburn	
7	213	Green Bay Packers	Chris Miller	WR	USC	from Oakland (Note: No. 213: Oakland → Green Bay (D). See Round 6: Green Bay → Oakland.)
7	214	Kansas City Chiefs	Nathan Parks	T	Stanford	from Miami (Note: No. 214: Miami → Kansas City (PD). Miami traded a seventh-round selection (214th overall) and a 1996 fourth-round selection to Kansas City in exchange for two 1996 fourth-round selections.)
7	215	St. Louis Rams	Cedric White	DE	North Carolina A&T	from San Diego (Note: No. 215: San Diego → St. Louis (D). See Round 5: St. Louis → San Diego.)
7	216	Tennessee Oilers	Armon Williams	LB	Arizona	
7	217	Cincinnati Bengals	William Carr	DT	Michigan	
7	218	San Diego Chargers	Toran James	LB	North Carolina A&T	from Kansas City via Pittsburgh. (Note: No. 218: Kansas City → Pittsburgh → San Diego. Multiple trades: Kansas City → Pittsburgh (PD). Kansas City traded a seventh-round selection (218th overall) to Pittsburgh in exchange for DE Brentson Buckner. Pittsburgh → San Diego (PD). See Round 5: San Diego → Pittsburgh.)
7	219	Indianapolis Colts	Clarence Thompson	CB	Knoxville	
7	220	Minnesota Vikings	Artie Ulmer	LB	Valdosta State	
7	221	Jacksonville Jaguars	Jon Hesse	LB	Nebraska	
7	222	Atlanta Falcons	Chris Bayne	CB	Fresno State	from Washington (Note: No. 222: Washington → Atlanta (D). See Round 5: Atlanta → Washington.)
7	223	Pittsburgh Steelers	Mike Adams	WR	Texas	
7	224	Dallas Cowboys	Omar Stoutmire	S	Fresno State	
7	225	Philadelphia Eagles	Byron Capers	CB	Florida State	
7	226	Buffalo Bills	Pat Fitzgerald	TE	Texas	
7	227	Philadelphia Eagles	DeAuntae Brown	CB	Central State	from San Francisco (Note: No. 227: San Francisco → Philadelphia (D). See Round 2: Philadelphia → San Francisco.)
7	228	Carolina Panthers	Kris Mangum	TE	Ole Miss	
7	229	New York Jets	Jason Ferguson	DT	Georgia	from Denver (Note: No. 229: NY Jets → Denver (D). See Round 3: NY Jets → Denver.)
7	230	New England Patriots	Scott Rehberg	T	Central Michigan	
7	231	Green Bay Packers	Jerald Sowell	FB	Tulane	
7*	232	Detroit Lions	Marcus Harris	WR	Wyoming	
7*	233	Chicago Bears	Marvin Thomas	DE	Memphis	
7*	234	Baltimore Ravens	Wally Richardson	QB	Penn State	
7*	235	Minnesota Vikings	Matthew Hatchette	WR	Langston	
7*	236	Baltimore Ravens	Ralph Staten	LB	Alabama	
7*	237	San Diego Chargers	Tony Corbin	QB	Sacramento State	
7*	238	Baltimore Ravens	Leland Taylor	DT	Louisville	
7*	239	Detroit Lions	Richard Jordan	LB	Missouri Southern	
7*	240	Green Bay Packers	Ronnie McAda	QB	Army	

== Notable undrafted players ==
†	Pro Bowler (Note: Players are identified as a Pro Bowler if they were selected for the Pro Bowl at any time in their career.)

Original NFL team	Player	Pos.	College	Notes
Atlanta Falcons	David Akers ^{†}	K	Louisville	
Baltimore Ravens	Priest Holmes ^{†}	RB	Texas	
Baltimore Ravens	Mike Flynn	C	Maine	
Baltimore Ravens	Daryl Terrell	T	Southern Miss	
Buffalo Bills	Bill Conaty	C	Virginia Tech	
Buffalo Bills	Pat Williams ^{†}	DT	Texas A&M	
Carolina Panthers	Waverly Jackson	T	Virginia Tech	
Chicago Bears	Obafemi Ayanbadejo	FB	San Diego State	
Chicago Bears	Kerry Jenkins	T	Troy State	
Chicago Bears	Kevin Swayne	WR	Wayne State	
Chicago Bears	Terry Cousin	CB	South Carolina	
Cincinnati Bengals	Steve Bush	TE	Arizona State	
Cincinnati Bengals	Rodney Heath	CB	Minnesota	
Cincinnati Bengals	Tim Terry	LB	Temple	
Dallas Cowboys	Toby Gowin	P	North Texas	
Dallas Cowboys	Kevin Mathis	CB	Texas A&M–Commerce	
Detroit Lions	Eric Beverly	C	Miami (OH)	
Detroit Lions	Travis Kirschke	DE	UCLA	
Denver Broncos	Matt Lepsis	T	Colorado	
Green Bay Packers	Joe Andruzzi	T	Southern Connecticut State	
Green Bay Packers	Henry Burris	QB	Temple	
Indianapolis Colts	Jason Johnson	C	Kansas State	
Indianapolis Colts	Phillip Ward	LB	UCLA	
Jacksonville Jaguars	Todd Fordham	T	Florida State	
Jacksonville Jaguars	Jabbar Threats	DE	Michigan State	
Jacksonville Jaguars	Al Wallace	DE	Maryland	
Kansas City Chiefs	Michael Blair	RB	Ball State	
Kansas City Chiefs	Billy Lyon	DT	Marshall	
Miami Dolphins	Mike Mohring	DT	Pittsburgh	
Minnesota Vikings	Todd Bouman	QB	St. Cloud State	
Minnesota Vikings	LeShun Daniels Sr.	T	Ohio State	
New England Patriots	Bernard Russ	LB	West Virginia	
New Orleans Saints	Jake Delhomme ^{†}	QB	Louisiana–Lafayette	
New Orleans Saints	Donovan Greer	CB	Texas A&M	
New Orleans Saints	Chris Hewitt	DB	Cincinnati	
New Orleans Saints	Sammy Knight ^{†}	S	USC	
New Orleans Saints	Keith Mitchell ^{†}	LB	Texas A&M	
New York Giants	Derek Engler	C	Wisconsin	
New York Giants	David Patten	WR	Western Carolina	
New York Jets	John Hall	K	Wisconsin	
Philadelphia Eagles	Chad Lewis ^{†}	TE	BYU	
Philadelphia Eagles	James Thrash	WR	Missouri Southern	
Pittsburgh Steelers	Mike Quinn	QB	Stephen F. Austin	
San Diego Chargers	Mike Maslowski	LB	Wisconsin–La Crosse	
San Francisco 49ers	Zack Bronson	S	McNeese State	
San Francisco 49ers	Ryan Longwell	K	California	
San Francisco 49ers	Brandon Noble	DT	Penn State	
San Francisco 49ers	Jeff Posey	LB	Southern Miss	
St. Louis Rams	Charlie Clemons	LB	Georgia	
St. Louis Rams	Mitch Jacoby	TE	Northern Illinois	
St. Louis Rams	Billy Jenkins	S	Howard	
St. Louis Rams	Bryan Robinson	DE	Fresno State	
Seattle Seahawks	Robert Wilson	WR	Florida A&M	
Tennessee Oilers	James Allen	RB	Oklahoma	
Tennessee Oilers	Spencer George	RB	Rice	
Tennessee Oilers	Blaine McElmurry	S	Montana	
Washington Redskins	Larry Moore	G	BYU	
Washington Redskins	R-Kal Truluck	DT	Cortland	

== Hall of Famers ==
- Walter Jones, offensive tackle from Florida State University taken 1st round 6th overall by the Seattle Seahawks.

inducted: Pro Football Hall of Fame class of 2014.

- Orlando Pace, offensive tackle from Ohio State University taken 1st round 1st overall by the St. Louis Rams.

inducted: Pro Football Hall of Fame class of 2016.

- Jason Taylor, defensive end from University of Akron taken 3rd round 73rd overall by the Miami Dolphins.

inducted: Pro Football Hall of Fame class of 2017.

- Tony Gonzalez, tight end from University of California taken 1st round 13th overall by the Kansas City Chiefs.

inducted: Pro Football Hall of Fame class of 2019.

- Ronde Barber, cornerback from University of Virginia taken 3rd round 66th overall by the Tampa Bay Buccaneers.

inducted: Pro Football Hall of Fame class of 2023.

== Trades ==
In the explanations below, (D) denotes trades that took place during the 1997 draft, while (PD) indicates trades completed pre-draft.

Round 1

Round 2

Round 3

Round 4

Round 5

Round 6

Round 7
