= 1996 Nebraska Cornhuskers football team =

American college football season

1996 Nebraska Cornhuskers football

Big 12 North Division champion Orange Bowl champion

Big 12 Championship Game, L 27–37 vs. Texas

Orange Bowl, W 41–21 vs. Virginia Tech
- Conference: Big 12 Conference
- North Division

Ranking
- Coaches: No. 6
- AP: No. 6
- Record: 11–2 (8–0 Big 12)
- Head coach: Tom Osborne (24th season)
- Offensive scheme: I formation
- Defensive coordinator: Charlie McBride (16th season)
- Base defense: 4–3
- Home stadium: Memorial Stadium

1996 Big 12 Conference football standings
	Conf.			Overall
Team	W		L	W		L
North Division
No. 6 Nebraska x%	8	–	0	11	–	2
No. 8 Colorado	7	–	1	10	–	2
No. 17 Kansas State	6	–	2	9	–	3
Missouri	3	–	5	5	–	6
Kansas	2	–	6	4	–	7
Iowa State	1	–	7	2	–	9
South Division
No. 23 Texas x$	6	–	2	8	–	5
Texas Tech	5	–	3	7	–	5
Texas A&M	4	–	4	6	–	6
Oklahoma	3	–	5	3	–	8
Oklahoma State	2	–	6	5	–	6
Baylor	1	–	7	4	–	7
Championship: Texas 37, Nebraska 27
x – Division champion/co-champions; $ – Bowl Alliance representative as champion % – Bowl Alliance at-large representative; Rankings from AP Poll

The 1996 Nebraska Cornhuskers football team represented the University of Nebraska–Lincoln in the 1996 NCAA Division I-A football season. The team was coached by Tom Osborne and played their home games in Memorial Stadium in Lincoln, Nebraska. This was the first season for Nebraska in the Big 12 Conference, which took on that name after their previous conference, the Big Eight Conference added four schools from the disbanded Southwest Conference. Nebraska was placed in the new conference's North Division along with Iowa State, Kansas, Kansas State, Missouri, and Colorado.

The Cornhuskers entered the season as the two-time defending national champions, having won the first Bowl Alliance championship game at the Fiesta Bowl in January 1996, and were ranked #1 in the polls to start the season. Nebraska also entered the season with a winning streak of 25 games, having not lost since falling to Florida State in the 1994 Orange Bowl.

Nebraska opened the season with a rout of Michigan State in their home opener and traveled to face Arizona State, a team they had defeated 77–28 the year before. This time, the results were different as Nebraska was shut out in a 19–0 defeat to snap their winning streak. They would not lose again during the regular season, winning the Big XII North and climbing back up to #3 in the polls. Their division win earned the Cornhuskers a place in the first Big 12 Championship Game against the winner of the South Division, unranked Texas. With a potential national championship game berth at stake, Nebraska lost for the second time in 1996 as Texas defeated them 37–27 to secure the automatic Bowl Alliance berth for the conference.

Despite this, Nebraska managed to qualify for the Bowl Alliance as an at-large team and was invited to play in the Orange Bowl, where they beat Virginia Tech.

== Schedule ==
Date	Time	Opponent	Rank	Site	TV	Result	Attendance
September 7	11:00 am	Michigan State*	No. 1	Memorial Stadium; Lincoln, NE	ABC	W 55–14	75,590
September 21	9:15 pm	at No. 17 Arizona State*	No. 1	Sun Devil Stadium; Tempe, AZ	FSN	L 0–19	74,089
September 28	11:30 am	Colorado State*	No. 8	Memorial Stadium; Lincoln, NE	ABC	W 65–9	75,575
October 5	11:30 am	at No. 16 Kansas State	No. 7	KSU Stadium; Manhattan, KS (rivalry)	ABC	W 39–3	43,916
October 12	1:00 pm	Baylor^{†}	No. 5	Memorial Stadium; Lincoln, NE		W 49–0	75,478
October 19	2:30 pm	at Texas Tech	No. 5	Jones Stadium; Lubbock, TX	ABC	W 24–10	51,344
October 26	6:00 pm	Kansas	No. 5	Memorial Stadium; Lincoln, NE (rivalry)	FSN	W 63–7	75,158
November 2	11:00 am	at Oklahoma	No. 5	Oklahoma Memorial Stadium; Norman, OK (rivalry)	ABC	W 73–21	75,004
November 9	1:00 pm	Missouri	No. 5	Memorial Stadium; Lincoln, NE (rivalry)		W 51–7	75,133
November 16	1:00 pm	at Iowa State	No. 5	Cyclone Stadium; Ames, IA (rivalry)		W 49–14	47,850
November 29	1:30 pm	No. 5 Colorado	No. 4	Memorial Stadium; Lincoln, NE (rivalry)	ABC	W 17–12	75,695
December 7	12:00 pm	vs. Texas	No. 3	Trans World Dome; St. Louis, MO (Big 12 Championship Game)	ABC	L 27–37	63,109
December 31	7:00 pm	vs. No. 10 Virginia Tech*	No. 6	Pro Player Stadium; Miami Gardens, FL (Orange Bowl)	CBS	W 41–21	51,212
*Non-conference game; ^{†}Homecoming; Rankings from AP Poll released prior to the game; All times are in Central time; Source:

== Rankings ==
Ranking movements Legend: ██ Increase in ranking ██ Decrease in ranking ( ) = First-place votes
	Week																	
Poll	Pre	1	2	3	4	5	6	7	8	9	10	11	12	13	14	15	16	Final
AP	1 (50)	1 (50)	1 (49)	1 (57)	1 (58)	8	7	5	5	5	5	5	5	5	4	3 (1)	6	6
Coaches	1 (47)		1 (51)	1 (57)	1 (58)	7	6	4	4	5	5	5	5	5	4	3	6	6

== Personnel ==
=== Roster ===
1996 Nebraska Cornhuskers football team roster
Players
Coaches
Offense

Pos.	#	Name	Class
FB	36	Dan Alexander	Fr
OT	70	Eric Anderson	Jr
WB	17	Sean Applegate	Fr
RB		Rod Baker	Fr
C	57	Matt Baldwin	Fr
OL		Sasho Becvarovski	Fr
IB	21	Damon Benning	Sr
SE		Tom Beveridge	Fr
WB	14	Lance Brown	So
TE	90	Tim Carpenter	Jr
SE	6	Kenny Cheatham	So
QB	9	Monte Christo	So
OT	68	Jeff Clausen	Fr
FB	42	Josh Cobb	So
TE	85	T.J. DeBates	Fr
C		Chris Deitloff	Fr
OL		Billy Diekmann	Fr
G	75	Chris Dishman	Sr
OL		Trenton Douglas	Fr
SE	3	J.R. Edwards	Fr
IB	23	Chad Eicher	Jr
IB	4	DeAngelo Evans	Fr
OL		Justin Ferrell	Fr
SE	15	Demond Finister	Fr
QB	19	Clint Finley	Fr
SE	87	Craig Fischer	Fr
SE		Tim Frame	Fr
QB	7	Scott Frost	Jr
OT	53	Lonnie Fulton	Fr
WB		Mike Gentile	Fr
OT	72	Ben Gessford	So
WB	27	John Gibson	Fr
IB	30	Ahman Green	So
SE	80	Billy Haafke	So
TE		Chris Hastings	Fr
C	53	Aaron Havlovic	Fr
SE	82	Ryan Held	Jr
OT	74	Kyle Henson	So
C	59	Josh Heskew	Jr
OL	55	Russ Hochstein	Fr
SE	5	Brendan Holbein	Sr
G	66	Joe Horst	Jr
G	62	Matt Hoskinson	Jr
TE	88	Sheldon Jackson	So
TE	34	Vershan Jackson	Jr
G	56	Marcus Johnson	Fr
OT	69	Adam Julch	Fr
FB	22	Ben Kingston	So
TE	83	Chad Kobus	Fr
SE	89	Jeff (Robert) Lake	Jr
FB	40	Billy Legate	So
QB	1	Frankie London	Fr
FB	45	Joel Makovicka	So
TE		Jake McKee	Fr
OT	78	Kory Mikos	Sr
WB	21	Andy Miller	So
FB	32	Willie Miller	Fr
IB	37	Jason Olnes	Fr
QB	12	Jeff Perino	Fr
RB		Hank Piening	Fr
OT	73	Fred Pollack	Jr
IB	24	Steve Raymond	Fr
TE	86	Dorrick Roy	So
QB		Jay Runty	Fr
OL		Chris Saalfeld	Fr
FB		Matt Schoening	Fr
FB	28	Brian Schuster	Sr
G	65	Jason Schwab	Fr
C	54	Doug Seaman	Jr
G	63	James Sherman	Fr
IB	31	James Sims	Jr
RB		Travis Soucie	Fr
FB		Jeremy Stanislav	Fr
OT	69	Jim Tansey	Fr
C	67	Aaron Taylor	Jr
FB		Arby Todd	Fr
OT	77	Adam Treu	Sr
QB	11	Matt Turman	Sr
G	71	Mike Van Cleave	Jr
WB	25	Jon Vedral	Sr
C	51	Matt Vrzal	Sr
G	61	Brandt Wade	So
OL		Brian Walters	Fr
TE		Brandon Wardyn	Fr
OL		David Webber	Fr
WB	33	Sean Wieting	Jr
WB	29	Shevin Wiggins	So
QB		Chad Wiles	Fr
TE	81	Aaron Wills	Fr
G	64	Jon Zatechka	Jr

Defense

Pos.	#	Name	Class
CB	48	Dave Alderman	Sr
DT	90	Derek Allen	Fr
DT	94	Luis Almanzar	Fr
DB		Josh Anderson	Fr
RE	96	Travis Antholz	Fr
WLB	45	Erick Arens	Fr
SLB	81	Larry Arnold	Sr
RE	87	Chris Bassett	Jr
FS	24	Jason Benes	Jr
RCB	17	Chad Blahak	Sr
LB		Blaine Boellstorff	Fr
LCB	20	Michael Booker	Sr
DB	21	Mike Brown	Fr
DB	22	Ralph Brown	Fr
MLB	36	Ben Buettenback	Fr
RCB	2	Leslie Dennis	Jr
ROV	13	George Dittrick	Fr
DT	74	Brandon Drum	So
DL		Jason Dush	Fr
WLB	43	Terrell Farley	Sr
DB		Eric Fischer	Fr
MLB	56	Jay Foreman	So
SLB	37	Russell Froehlich	So
RCB	12	Mike Fullman	Sr
RE	40	Sean Gard	Jr
DL		Bobby Gill	Fr
DE		George Guidry	Fr
SLB	86	Trent Gumm	So
DB		Brad Hamik	Fr
LB	44	Jon Hesse	Sr
WLB	49	Quint Hogrefe	So
WLB	53	Matt Hunting	Jr
MLB	50	Julius Jackson	Fr
RCB	1	Tom Jeffrey	Fr
WLB	1	Eric Johnson	So
RE		Dave Jones	So
DE	88	Loran Kaiser	Fr
RE	57	Chad Kelsay	So
WLB	47	Josh Kohl	Fr
RE	80	Curt Lenners	Jr
ROV	29	Gregg List	Fr
WLB	41	Casey Macken	So
ROV	21	Kalin Makaiwi	So
RCB	20	Alex McClymont	So
ROV	4	Octavious McFarlin	Jr
FS	25	Greg McGraw	Fr
DT	72	Tom Milius	Fr
RE	83	Bryce Miller	Sr
ROV	10	Mike Minter	Sr
RE		Brandon Mooberry	Fr
RE		John Murphy	Fr
DT	97	Jeff Ogard	Sr
SLB	37	Tony Ortiz	Fr
DT	55	Jason Peter	Jr
RCB	26	Jerome Peterson	Fr
LB	42	Carlos Polk	Fr
DB		Brandon Quindt	Fr
CB	2	Khari Reynolds	Fr
ROV	39	Mike Roberts	Sr
DL		Laron Rooks	Fr
RE	84	Mike Rucker	So
RE	86	Eric Ryan	Fr
DT	74	Scott Saltsman	Sr
RE		Matt Schwager	Fr
RE	15	Kareem Sears	Fr
SLB	46	Brian Shaw	Fr
DL		Scott Siebenborn	Fr
FS	16	Eric Stokes	Sr
WLB	91	Ryan Terwilliger	Sr
DT	79	Ross Tessendorf	So
LCB	14	Andy Thompson	So
RE	92	Travis Toline	So
RE	93	Jared Tomich	Sr
DT	94	Larry Townsend	Sr
DT	65	Theron Troxel	Fr
LB		Chad Tuttle	Fr
LB		Noland Urban	Fr
DB		Casey Vanderhoef	Fr
FS	32	Eric Walther	So
FS	3	Eric Warfield	Jr
DT	85	Steve Warren	Fr
DB		Troy Watchorn	Fr
WLB	52	Keely Watson	Jr
FS	25	Jeff Wells	Fr
SLB	28	Jamel Williams	Sr
DT	99	Jason Wiltz	So
DL		Terry Winston	Fr
RE	98	Grant Wistrom	Jr
RE	87	Brendan Zahl	Jr

Special teams

Pos.	#	Name	Class
PK	35	Kris Brown	So
P/PK	17	Dan Hadenfeldt	Fr
P	19	Jesse Kosch	Jr
P	23	Bill Lafleur	So
PK		Chace Long	Fr
P	8	Brian Morro	So
PK	13	Ted Retzlaff	Jr

Head coach

- Tom Osborne
  24th season
  33rd year at Nebraska
  Alma mater: Hastings College

Coordinators/assistant coaches

- Charlie McBride
  16th season as DC/DL coach
  20th year at Nebraska
  Alma mater: Colorado
- Turner Gill
  5th season as QB coach
  5th year at Nebraska
  Alma mater: Nebraska
- Craig Bohl
  2nd season as LB coach
  5th year at Nebraska
  Alma mater: Nebraska
- Ron Brown
  10th season as WR/TE coach
  10th year at Nebraska
  Alma mater: Brown
- Dan Young
  14th season as OL/K coach
  14th year at Nebraska
  Alma mater: Reed
- Milt Tenopir
  23rd season as OL coach
  23rd year at Nebraska
  Alma mater: Sterling
- Tony Samuel
  11th season as OLB coach
  11th year at Nebraska
  Alma mater: Nebraska
- George Darlington
  DB coach
  24th year at Nebraska
  Alma mater: Rutgers
- Frank Solich
  14th season as RB coach
  18th year at Nebraska
  Alma mater: Nebraska
- Boyd Epley
  28th season as S&C coach
  28th year at Nebraska
  Alma mater: Nebraska

Legend

- (C) Team captain
- (S) Suspended
- (I) Ineligible
- Injured
- Redshirt

Roster
Last update: January 17, 2011

=== Depth chart ===
Defense

FS
Eric Stokes
Eric Warfield
Eric Walther

WILL	MIKE	SAM
Terrell Farley; Ryan Terwilliger	John Hesse	Jamel Williams
Mike Minter; Octavious McFarlin	Jay Foreman	Brian Shaw
Eric Johnson	Julius Jackson	Tony Ortiz

ROVER
Mike Minter
Octavious McFarlin
Gregg List

CB
Michael Booker
Jerome Peterson
Mike Fullman

DE	DT	DT	DE
Grant Wistrom	Jason Peter	Jeff Ogard	Jared Tomich
Chad Kelsay	Scott Saltsman	Jason Wiltz	Mike Rucker
Kareem Sears	Derek Allen	Steve Warren	Travis Toline

CB
Ralph Brown
Mike Brown
Leslie Dennis

Offense

WR
Jon Vedral
Lance Brown
Shevin Wiggins

LT	LG	C	RG	RT
Adam Treu	Chris Dishman	Aaron Taylor	Jon Zatechka	Eric Anderson
Fred Pollack	James Shreman	Josh Heskew	Matt Hoskinson	Kory Mikos
Adam Julch	Brandt Wade	Matt Vrzal	Mike Van Cleave	Jeff Clausen

TE
Tim Carpenter
Vershan Jackson
Sheldon Jackson

WR
Brandon Holbein
Kenny Cheatham
Jeff Lake
⋅

QB
Scott Frost
Matt Turman
Monte Christo

RB
Ahman Green
DeAngelo Evans
Damon Benning
James Sims

FB
Brian Schuster
Joel Makovicka
Billy Legate

Special teams
PK Kris Brown
P Jesse Kosch

== Game summaries ==
=== Michigan State ===
Michigan State at Nebraska [box score]

Team	1	2	3	4	Total
Michigan State	0	0	7	7	14
• Nebraska	7	20	21	7	55

- Date: September 7
- Location: Memorial Stadium, Lincoln, Nebraska
- Game attendance: 75,590

=== Arizona State ===
Nebraska at Arizona State [box score]

Team	1	2	3	4	Total
Nebraska	0	0	0	0	0
• Arizona State	9	8	0	2	19

- Date: September 21
- Location: Sun Devil Stadium, Tempe, Arizona
- Game attendance: 74,089

=== Colorado State ===
Colorado State at Nebraska [box score]

Team	1	2	3	4	Total
Colorado State	0	6	0	3	9
• Nebraska	7	17	20	21	65

- Date: September 28
- Location: Memorial Stadium, Lincoln, Nebraska
- Game attendance: 75,575

=== Kansas State ===
Nebraska at Kansas State [box score]

Team	1	2	3	4	Total
• Nebraska	6	12	14	7	39
Kansas State	0	3	0	0	3

- Date: October 5
- Location: KSU Stadium, Manhattan, Kansas
- Game attendance: 43,916

=== Baylor ===
Baylor at Nebraska [box score]

Team	1	2	3	4	Total
Baylor	0	0	0	0	0
• Nebraska	7	21	14	7	49

- Date: October 12
- Location: Memorial Stadium, Lincoln, Nebraska
- Game attendance: 75,478

=== Texas Tech ===
Nebraska at Texas Tech [box score]

Team	1	2	3	4	Total
• Nebraska	7	3	7	7	24
Texas Tech	7	3	0	0	10

- Date: October 19
- Location: Clifford B. and Audrey Jones Stadium, Lubbock, Texas
- Game attendance: 51,344

=== Kansas ===
Kansas at Nebraska [box score]

Team	1	2	3	4	Total
Kansas	0	7	0	0	7
• Nebraska	7	35	14	7	63

- Date: October 26
- Location: Memorial Stadium, Lincoln, Nebraska
- Game attendance: 75,158

=== Oklahoma ===
Nebraska at Oklahoma [box score]

Team	1	2	3	4	Total
• Nebraska	0	17	28	28	73
Oklahoma	0	0	0	21	21

- Date: November 2
- Location: Oklahoma Memorial Stadium, Norman, Oklahoma
- Game attendance: 75,004

=== Missouri ===
Missouri at Nebraska [box score]

Team	1	2	3	4	Total
Missouri	0	0	0	7	7
• Nebraska	7	16	28	0	51

- Date: November 9
- Location: Memorial Stadium, Lincoln, Nebraska
- Game attendance: 75,133

=== Iowa State ===
Nebraska at Iowa State [box score]

Team	1	2	3	4	Total
• Nebraska	20	8	14	7	49
Iowa State	0	0	7	7	14

- Date: November 16
- Location: Cyclone Stadium, Ames, Iowa
- Game attendance: 47,850

=== Colorado ===
Colorado at Nebraska [box score]

Team	1	2	3	4	Total
Colorado	6	0	3	3	12
• Nebraska	7	10	0	0	17

- Date: November 29
- Location: Memorial Stadium, Lincoln, Nebraska
- Game attendance: 75,695

=== Texas ===
Nebraska vs Texas [box score]

Team	1	2	3	4	Total
Nebraska	7	10	7	3	27
• Texas	7	13	3	14	37

- Date: December 7
- Location: Trans World Dome, St. Louis, Missouri
- Game attendance: 63,109

=== Virginia Tech ===
Virginia Tech vs Nebraska [box score]

Team	1	2	3	4	Total
Virginia Tech	7	7	7	0	21
• Nebraska	0	17	14	10	41

- Date: December 31
- Location: Pro Player Stadium, Miami Gardens, Florida
- Game attendance: 51,212

== Rankings ==
Ranking movements Legend: ██ Increase in ranking ██ Decrease in ranking
	Week																	
Poll	Pre	1	2	3	4	5	6	7	8	9	10	11	12	13	14	15	16	Final
AP	1	1	1	1	1	8	7	5	5	5	5	5	5	5	4	3	6	6
Coaches																		6

== Awards ==
Award	Name(s)
All-America 1st team	Aaron Taylor, Jared Tomich, Grant Wistrom
All-America 2nd team	Chris Dishman
Big 12 Defensive Player of the Year	Grant Wistrom
All-America Freshman 1st team	Ralph Brown
All-Big 12 1st team	Chris Dishman, Jon Hesse, Jared Tomich, Mike Minter, Jason Peter, Aaron Taylor, Grant Wistrom
All-Big 12 2nd team	Eric Anderson, Michael Booker, Kris Brown, Jeff Ogard, Jamel Williams
All-Big 12 3rd team	Scott Frost, Terrell Farley, Ahman Green
All-Big 12 honorable mention	Ralph Brown, DeAngelo Evans, Brendan Holbein, Vershan Jackson, Jesse Kosch, Brian Schuster, Eric Stokes, Jon Vedral, Jamel Williams
Big 12 coach of the Year	Tom Osborne

=== NFL and pro players ===
The following Nebraska players who participated in the 1996 season later moved on to the next level and joined a professional or semi-pro team as draftees or free agents.

Name	Team
Dan Alexander	Tennessee Titans
Eric Anderson	Amsterdam Admirals
Michael Booker	Atlanta Falcons
Kris Brown	Pittsburgh Steelers
Mike Brown	Chicago Bears
Ralph Brown	New York Giants
Chris Dishman	Arizona Cardinals
Clint Finley	Kansas City Chiefs
Jay Foreman	Buffalo Bills
Ahman Green	Seattle Seahawks
Jon Hesse	Green Bay Packers
Russ Hochstein	Tampa Bay Buccaneers
Sheldon Jackson	Buffalo Bills
Vershan Jackson	Kansas City Chiefs
Eric Johnson	Oakland Raiders
Chad Kelsay	Pittsburgh Steelers
Bill Lafleur	Barcelona Dragons
Joel Makovicka	Arizona Cardinals
Mike Minter	Carolina Panthers
Tony Ortiz	Scottish Claymores
Jason Peter	Carolina Panthers
Carlos Polk	San Diego Chargers
Mike Rucker	Carolina Panthers
Eric Stokes	Seattle Seahawks
Jared Tomich	New Orleans Saints
Larry Townsend	Berlin Thunder
Adam Treu	Oakland Raiders
Eric Warfield	Kansas City Chiefs
Steve Warren	Green Bay Packers
Jamel Williams	Washington Redskins
Jason Wiltz	New York Jets
Grant Wistrom	St. Louis Rams
Jon Zatechka	Berlin Thunder
