= 1996 Oklahoma Sooners football team =

American college football season

1996 Oklahoma Sooners football
- Conference: Big 12 Conference
- South Division
- Record: 3–8 (3–5 Big 12)
- Head coach: John Blake (1st season)
- Offensive coordinator: Dick Winder (1st season)
- Offensive scheme: Pro-style
- Defensive coordinator: Bill Young (1st season)
- Base defense: 4–3
- Captain: Game captains
- Home stadium: Oklahoma Memorial Stadium

1996 Big 12 Conference football standings
	Conf.			Overall
Team	W		L	W		L
North Division
No. 6 Nebraska x%	8	–	0	11	–	2
No. 8 Colorado	7	–	1	10	–	2
No. 17 Kansas State	6	–	2	9	–	3
Missouri	3	–	5	5	–	6
Kansas	2	–	6	4	–	7
Iowa State	1	–	7	2	–	9
South Division
No. 23 Texas x$	6	–	2	8	–	5
Texas Tech	5	–	3	7	–	5
Texas A&M	4	–	4	6	–	6
Oklahoma	3	–	5	3	–	8
Oklahoma State	2	–	6	5	–	6
Baylor	1	–	7	4	–	7
Championship: Texas 37, Nebraska 27
x – Division champion/co-champions; $ – Bowl Alliance representative as champion % – Bowl Alliance at-large representative; Rankings from AP Poll

The 1996 Oklahoma Sooners football team represented the University of Oklahoma during the 1996 NCAA Division I-A football season. They played their home games at Oklahoma Memorial Stadium and participated as members of the newly formed Big 12 Conference in the South Division. They were coached by John Blake.

== Schedule ==
Date	Time	Opponent	Site	TV	Result	Attendance
September 7	2:30 p.m.	TCU*	Oklahoma Memorial Stadium; Norman, OK	ABC	L 7–20	65,569
September 21	10:05 p.m.	at San Diego State*	Jack Murphy Stadium; San Diego, CA	KWTV	L 31–51	34,812
September 28	1:30 p.m.	Tulsa*	Oklahoma Memorial Stadium; Norman, OK		L 24–31	68,384
October 5	11:30 a.m.	Kansas	Oklahoma Memorial Stadium; Norman, OK	FSN	L 24–52	64,333
October 12	2:30 p.m.	vs. No. 25 Texas	Cotton Bowl; Dallas, TX (Red River Shootout)	ABC	W 30–27 ^{OT}	75,587
October 19	6:00 p.m.	at Baylor	Floyd Casey Stadium; Waco, TX		W 28–24	35,712
October 26	1:10 p.m.	at No. 16 Kansas State	KSU Stadium; Manhattan, KS		L 35–42	43,815
November 2	11:00 a.m.	No. 5 Nebraska	Oklahoma Memorial Stadium; Norman, OK (rivalry)	ABC	L 21–73	75,004
November 9	11:30 a.m.	at Oklahoma State	Lewis Field; Stillwater, OK (Bedlam Series)	FSN	W 27–17	51,416
November 16	2:30 p.m.	at Texas A&M	Kyle Field; College Station, TX	ABC	L 16–33	66,161
November 23	2:30 p.m.	Texas Tech	Oklahoma Memorial Stadium; Norman, OK	ABC	L 12–22	61,217
*Non-conference game; Rankings from AP Poll released prior to the game; All times are in Central time

== Roster ==
1996 Oklahoma Sooners football team roster
Players
Coaches
Offense

Pos.	#	Name	Class
TE	80	Stephen Alexander	Jr
RB	25	James Allen	Sr
TE	90	Matt Anderson	Fr
QB	2	John Barber	Fr
WR	83	Todd Barnes	Fr
OL	76	Al Baysinger	Fr
FL	24	Chris Blocker	So
OL	63	Jason Bronson	Jr
WR	3	Terrence Brown	Sr
OT	50	David Bullard	Sr
HB	34	Bennie Butler	So
OL	66	Chris Campbell	Sr
OL	68	Adam Carpenter	Fr
FB	32	Dwayne Chandler	Sr
OL	62	Ricky Clark	Fr
RB	8	Brandon Daniels	Fr
FB	30	Jermaine Fazande	So
TE	86	Jason Freeman	So
QB	12	Justin Fuente	Fr
OL	70	Barry Giles	Jr
OL	53	Fred Goodwin	Fr
WR	5	Steven Gortmaker	Jr
DB	23	Dennis Hubbard	Fr
OT	69	Robert Ingram	Jr
OL	60	Cornelius Jackson	Fr
WR	19	Jarrail Jackson	Fr
OL	72	Scott Kempenich	Fr
WR	18	Mo Little	Jr
OL	77	Tim Macias	So
OL	73	Bruce McClure	Jr
QB	1	Eric Moore	So
QB	17	Gary Don Moore	Fr
OL	54	Greg Moyer	So
OL	64	John Mulac	Jr
OL	67	Derrick Nelson	Jr
FB	38	Jason Newton	Fr
HB	33	De'Mond Parker	Fr
QB	16	Raphael Powers	Fr
DB	47	Rodney Rideaux	Fr
FB	20	Michael Rose	Jr
C	55	Able Simmons	So
OL	71	Jay Smith	So
WR	5	Seth Smith	So
QB	11	Jay Stuckey	So
WR	21	Michael Thompson	Sr
TE	88	Kevin Webster	Fr
OL	61	Taylor Wickersham	Jr
WR	10	Gerald Williams	So
OL	65	Sammy Williams	Jr
FB	85	Brent Wyatt	Fr

Defense

Pos.	#	Name	Class
LB	84	Dale Allen	So
DT	78	Ryan Allen	Fr
DE	99	Carlos Baker	So
DE	74	C.B. Baker	Fr
SS	32	Dan Beiseigel	Fr
DB	31	Brandon Berg	Fr
LB	57	Casey Bookout	Fr
DL	96	Shaq Brown	Jr
CB	21	Ramon Burroughs	Jr
DL	87	Cornelius Burton	Fr
DL	93	Martin Chase	Jr
CB	8	Chad Dainty	Fr
SS	42	Anthony Davis	Fr
FS	14	Cornelius Davis	Jr
DB	28	Derek Dorsey	Fr
DE	90	Aaron Findley	Fr
DL	75	Ryan Fisher	Sr
FS	9	Anthony Fogle	Sr
DT	97	Kelly Gregg	So
SS	17	Rod Henderson	Sr
FS	23	Ike Inyang	Fr
LB	43	Corey Ivy	Jr
LB	48	Sedric Jones	Sr
CB	29	Gana Joseph	So
LB	40	Chris Justice	Fr
LB	49	Terrance Malone	So
DE	85	Rod Manuel	Jr
DE	40	Matt McCormick	So
LB	44	Scott Ousley	Fr
ILB	45	Tyrell Peters	Sr
DE	91	Mike Phipps	Jr
OLB	92	Ed Pierce	Fr
DB	37	Steve Riddley	Jr
DE	54	Sabastien Roegiers	Jr
OLB	27	Collin Rosenberg	Sr
SS	26	David Rowe	So
FS	16	Rusty Rushing	Fr
OLB	51	Broderick Simpson	Sr
OLB	36	Travian Smith	Jr
CB	7	Cedric Stephens	So
DT	76	Barron Tanner	Sr
FS	39	Barry Vardeman	Fr
LB	35	Ryan Vardeman	Sr
CB	58	Ryan Wallis	Jr
SS	13	Terry White	So
DT	98	Steve Williams	Fr
DL	95	Scott Wilson	Jr
CB	4	Pee Wee Woods	Fr
DB	41	Mike Woods	Fr

Special teams

Pos.	#	Name	Class
K	15	Jeremy Alexander	Jr
K	36	Chad Cochell	Fr
K	6	Steve Daniels	Fr
K	45	Seth Hendrick	Fr
K	9	John Hillman	Fr
P	82	Brian Lewis	So
K	37	Nick Lynch	Jr

Head coach

- John Blake

Coordinators/assistant coaches

- Dick Winder – Offensive coordinator
- Joe Dickinson – Running backs
- Clarence James – Wide receivers
- Denver Johnson – Offensive line
- Bill Young – Defensive coordinator
- Kenith Pope – Defensive end
- Pete McGinnis – Linebackers
- Chris Thurmond – Defensive backs
- Chuck Langston – Graduate assistant

Legend

- (C) Team captain
- (S) Suspended
- (I) Ineligible
- Injured
- Redshirt

Roster

== Awards ==
- All-Big 12: LB Tyrell Peters

== 1997 NFL draft ==
The following Sooners were selected in the 1997 NFL draft.

Round	Pick	Player	Position	NFL team
5	145	Barron Tanner	Defensive tackle	Miami Dolphins
6	199	Rod Manuel	Defensive end	Pittsburgh Steelers
