= 1996 Holiday Bowl =

1996 Plymouth Holiday Bowl
Colorado Buffaloes	Washington Huskies
(9–2)	(9–2)
Big 12	Pac-10
33	21
Head coach: Rick Neuheisel	Head coach: Jim Lambright
AP / Coaches / BA; 8 / 8 / 8	AP / Coaches / BA; 13 / 12 / 12
	1	2	3	4	Total
Colorado	7	17	3	6	33
Washington	14	7	0	0	21
- Date: December 30, 1996
- Season: 1996
- Stadium: Jack Murphy Stadium
- Location: San Diego, California
- MVP: Offensive: Koy Detmer (Colorado); Defensive: Nick Ziegler (Colorado)
- Halftime show: Marching bands
- Attendance: 54,749
- Payout: US$1,433,883 per team

United States TV coverage
- Network: ESPN
- Announcers: Brad Nessler, Gary Danielson, and Adrian Karsten

The 1996 Holiday Bowl was a college football bowl game played December 30, 1996, in San Diego, California. It was part of the 1996 NCAA Division I-A football season. It featured the Colorado Buffaloes, and the Washington Huskies.

== Game summary ==
Washington scored first following a 2-yard touchdown run from running back Corey Dillon, and the Huskies opened up a 7–0 lead. Corey Dillon later scored on a 12-yard touchdown run, increasing Washington's lead to 14–0. 45 seconds later, Colorado quarterback Koy Detmer threw a 75-yard 'bullet' to wide receiver Rae Carruth to close Colorado to within 14–7.

In the second quarter, Nick Ziegler returned a Washington interception 31 yards for a touchdown, tying the game at 14. On the very next play, Jerome Pathon returned the kickoff 86 yards for a touchdown, and Washington reclaimed the lead at 21–14. Koy Detmer later threw a 7-yard touchdown pass to Darrin Chiaqverini for a 7-yard touchdown pass, and the score was tied at 21. Jeremy Aldrich kicked a 42-yard field goal before halftime, to put Colorado on top 24–21.

In the third quarter, Aldrich kicked a 36-yard field goal to increase Colorado's lead to 27–21. In the fourth quarter, Koy Detmer threw a 4-yard touchdown pass to Rae Carruth, but the 2-point conversion attempt was unsuccessful, and Colorado was up 33–21. They held on to that lead to win the game by that same margin. Koy Detmer went 25-for-45 for 371 yards and three touchdowns for Colorado. Defensive lineman Nick Ziegler was named defensive MVP.
