= 1996 Big 12 Championship Game =

- Inaugural Big 12 Championship Game
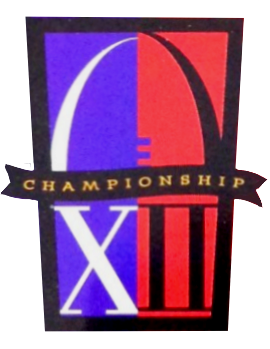
Nebraska Cornhuskers	Texas Longhorns
(10–1)	(7–4)
27	37
Head coach: Tom Osborne	Head coach: John Mackovic
AP / Coaches; 3 / 3
	1	2	3	4	Total
Nebraska	7	10	7	3	27
Texas	7	13	3	14	37
- Date: December 7, 1996
- Season: 1996
- Stadium: Trans World Dome
- Location: St. Louis, Missouri
- MVP: DeAngelo Evans (RB, Nebraska)
- Referee: John Laurie
- Attendance: 63,109

United States TV coverage
- Network: ABC
- Announcers: Brent Musburger and Dick Vermeil

1996 Big 12 Conference football standings
	Conf.			Overall
Team	W		L	W		L
North Division
No. 6 Nebraska x%	8	–	0	11	–	2
No. 8 Colorado	7	–	1	10	–	2
No. 17 Kansas State	6	–	2	9	–	3
Missouri	3	–	5	5	–	6
Kansas	2	–	6	4	–	7
Iowa State	1	–	7	2	–	9
South Division
No. 23 Texas x$	6	–	2	8	–	5
Texas Tech	5	–	3	7	–	5
Texas A&M	4	–	4	6	–	6
Oklahoma	3	–	5	3	–	8
Oklahoma State	2	–	6	5	–	6
Baylor	1	–	7	4	–	7
Championship: Texas 37, Nebraska 27
x – Division champion/co-champions; $ – Bowl Alliance representative as champion % – Bowl Alliance at-large representative; Rankings from AP Poll

The 1996 Big 12 Championship Game was a college football game played on Saturday, December 7, 1996, at Trans World Dome in St. Louis. This was the 1st Big 12 Championship Game and determined the 1996 champion of the Big 12 Conference. The game featured the Nebraska Cornhuskers, champions of the North division, and the Texas Longhorns, champions of the South division.

== Game summary ==
1996 Big 12 Championship Game

Quarter	1	2	3	4	Total
No. 3 Nebraska	7	10	7	3	27
Texas	7	13	3	14	37

at Trans World Dome • St. Louis, Missouri

- Date: December 7, 1996
- Game time: 12:00 p.m. CST
- TV announcers (ABC): Brent Musburger and Dick Vermeil
- Big 12 game summary

Game information

First quarter

- (11:25) TEX – Priest Holmes 5 yard run, Phil Dawson kick (Drive: 11 plays, 80 yards, 3:35; TEX 7–0)
- (0:14) NEB – DeAngelo Evans 2 yard run, Kris Brown kick (Drive: 12 plays, 80 yards, 5:45; Tied 7–7)

Second quarter

- (11:50) TEX – Phil Dawson 49 yard field goal (Drive: 4 plays, 5 yards, 0:49; TEX 10–7)
- (8:39) NEB – Kris Brown 51 yard field goal (Drive: 7 plays, 31 yards, 3:11; Tied 10–10)
- (7:24) TEX – Priest Holmes 61 yard run, Phil Dawson kick (Drive: 3 plays, 87 yards, 1:15; TEX 17–10)
- (2:23) NEB – DeAngelo Evans 23 yard run, Kris Brown kick (Drive: 11 plays, 80 yards, 5:01; Tied 17–17)
- (1:00) TEX – Phil Dawson 30 yard field goal (Drive: 9 plays, 63 yards, 1:23; TEX 20–17)

Third quarter

- (8:30) TEX – Phil Dawson 47 yard field goal (Drive: 6 plays, 52 yards, 2:29; TEX 23–17)
- (2:11) NEB – DeAngelo Evans 6 yard run, Kris Brown kick (Drive: 15 plays, 72 yards, 6:19; NEB 24–23)

Fourth quarter

- (10:11) NEB – Kris Brown 24 yard field goal (Drive: 13 plays, 46 yards, 5:22; NEB 27–23)
- (8:53) TEX – Wane McGarity 66 yard pass from James Brown, Phil Dawson kick (Drive: 3 plays, 80 yards, 1:18; TEX 30–27)
- (1:53) TEX – Priest Holmes 11 yard run, Phil Dawson kick (Drive: 7 plays, 93 yards, 2:13; TEX 37–27)

=== Statistics ===
Statistics	NEB	TEX
First downs	26	22
Plays–yards	87–398	57–503
Rushes–yards	63–243	28–150
Passing yards	155	353
Passing: comp–att–int	15–24–0	19–29–2
Time of possession	39:35	20:25

Team	Category	Player	Statistics
Nebraska	Passing	Scott Frost	15–24, 155 yds
Nebraska	Rushing	DeAngelo Evans	32 car, 130 yds, 3 TD
Nebraska	Receiving	Brendan Holbein	3 rec, 43 yds
Texas	Passing	James Brown	19–28, 353 yds, 1 TD, 2 INT
Texas	Rushing	Priest Holmes	9 car, 120 yds, 3 TD
Texas	Receiving	Mike Adams	6 rec, 92 yds
