= Anthony DeGrate =

American football player (born 1973)

Profile
- Position: Defensive tackle

Personal information
- Born: November 15, 1973 (age 52); Waco, Texas, U.S.

Career information
- College: Stephen F. Austin
- NFL draft: 1997: 7th round, 209th overall pick

Anthony DeGrate (born November 15, 1973) is an American former college football player who was a defensive tackle for the Stephen F. Austin Lumberjacks. He was selected by the Tampa Bay Buccaneers of the National Football League (NFL) in the seventh round of the 1997 NFL draft. He never played a season in the league.

== Biography ==
DeGrate was born in Waco, Texas and played college football at Stephen F. Austin State University. He was unable to play football for two years while at Stephen F. Austin for academic reasons. He was selected by the Tampa Bay Buccaneers in the seventh round of the 1997 NFL draft and was waived by Tampa Bay in August 1998. He did not play a game in the NFL.
