= 1996 Texas A&M Aggies football team =

American college football season

1996 Texas A&M Aggies football
- Conference: Big 12 Conference
- South Division
- Record: 6–6 (4–4 Big 12)
- Head coach: R. C. Slocum (8th season)
- Offensive coordinator: Steve Ensminger (3rd season)
- Offensive scheme: Pro-style
- Defensive coordinator: Phil Bennett (2nd season)
- Base defense: 4–3
- Home stadium: Kyle Field

1996 Big 12 Conference football standings
	Conf.			Overall
Team	W		L	W		L
North Division
No. 6 Nebraska x%	8	–	0	11	–	2
No. 8 Colorado	7	–	1	10	–	2
No. 17 Kansas State	6	–	2	9	–	3
Missouri	3	–	5	5	–	6
Kansas	2	–	6	4	–	7
Iowa State	1	–	7	2	–	9
South Division
No. 23 Texas x$	6	–	2	8	–	5
Texas Tech	5	–	3	7	–	5
Texas A&M	4	–	4	6	–	6
Oklahoma	3	–	5	3	–	8
Oklahoma State	2	–	6	5	–	6
Baylor	1	–	7	4	–	7
Championship: Texas 37, Nebraska 27
x – Division champion/co-champions; $ – Bowl Alliance representative as champion % – Bowl Alliance at-large representative; Rankings from AP Poll

The 1996 Texas A&M Aggies football team represented Texas A&M University as a member of the South Division of the newly-formed Big 12 Conference during the 1996 NCAA Division I-A football season. Led by eighth-year head coach R. C. Slocum, the Aggies compiled an overall record of 6–6 with a mark of 4–4 in conference play, placing third in the Big 12's South Division. Texas A&M played home games at Kyle Field in College Station, Texas.

== Schedule ==
Date	Time	Opponent	Rank	Site	TV	Result	Attendance	Source
August 24	11:00 am	at BYU*	No. 13	Cougar Stadium; Provo, UT (Pigskin Classic)	ABC	L 37–41	55,229	
September 14	7:00 pm	at Southwestern Louisiana*	No. 25	Cajun Field; Lafayette, LA		L 22–29	38,783	
September 21	4:00 pm	North Texas*		Kyle Field; College Station, TX		W 55–0	56,308	
September 28	2:30 pm	No. 12 Colorado		Kyle Field; College Station, TX	ABC	L 10–24	70,339	
October 5	4:00 pm	Louisiana Tech*		Kyle Field; College Station, TX		W 63–13	52,522	
October 12	11:30 am	at Iowa State		Cyclone Stadium; Ames, IA	FSN	W 24–21	44,950	
October 19	6:00 pm	No. 19 Kansas State		Kyle Field; College Station, TX	FSN	L 20–23	64,155	
October 26	11:30 am	Texas Tech		Kyle Field; College Station, TX (rivalry)	FSN	L 10–13	70,147	
November 2	2:00 pm	at Oklahoma State		Lewis Field; Stillwater, OK		W 38–19	41,250	
November 9	2:30 pm	at Baylor		Floyd Casey Stadium; Waco, TX (Battle of the Brazos)	ABC	W 24–7	45,112	
November 16	2:30 pm	Oklahoma		Kyle Field; College Station, TX	ABC	W 33–16	66,161	
November 29	10:00 am	at Texas		Darrell K Royal–Texas Memorial Stadium; Austin, TX (rivalry)	ABC	L 15–51	81,887	
*Non-conference game; Rankings from AP Poll released prior to the game; All times are in Central time

== Game summaries ==
=== BYU ===
	1	2	3	4	Total
#13 Texas A&M	10	10	14	3	37
BYU	6	14	6	15	41

=== Southwestern Louisiana ===
	1	2	3	4	Total
#25 Texas A&M	7	6	9	0	22
Southwestern Louisiana	14	7	0	8	29

The Cajuns upset then-25th-ranked Aggies.

=== North Texas ===
	1	2	3	4	Total
North Texas	0	0	0	0	0
Texas A&M	3	25	20	7	55

=== Colorado ===
	1	2	3	4	Total
#12 Colorado	7	14	3	0	24
Texas A&M	0	7	0	3	10

=== Louisiana Tech ===
	1	2	3	4	Total
Louisiana Tech	3	3	0	7	13
Texas A&M	14	28	14	7	63

=== Iowa State ===
	1	2	3	4	Total
Texas A&M	17	0	0	7	24
Iowa State	0	7	7	7	21

=== Kansas State ===
	1	2	3	4	Total
#21 Kansas State	13	7	3	0	23
Texas A&M	3	0	7	10	20

=== Texas Tech ===
	1	2	3	4	Total
Texas Tech	3	3	0	7	13
Texas A&M	0	3	7	0	10

=== Oklahoma State ===
	1	2	3	4	Total
Texas A&M	7	3	14	14	38
Oklahoma State	7	6	6	0	19

=== Baylor ===
	1	2	3	4	Total
Texas A&M	0	0	14	10	24
Baylor	7	0	0	0	7

=== Oklahoma ===
	1	2	3	4	Total
Oklahoma	0	16	0	0	16
Texas A&M	13	0	10	10	33

=== Texas ===
	1	2	3	4	Total
Texas A&M	0	9	0	6	15
Texas	10	7	20	14	51

== Roster ==
1996 Texas A&M Aggies football team roster
Players
Coaches
Offense

Pos.	#	Name	Class
RB	22	Eric Bernard	So
WR	24	Jason Bragg	Fr
WR	86	Darren Brinkley	So
TE	82	RoDerrick Broughton	Fr
OL	75	Don Brown	So
RB	33	Marc Broyles	So
WR	81	Matt Bumgardner	Fr
TE	89	Dan Campbell	So
WR	16	Chris Cole	Fr
OL	54	Calvin Collins	Sr
WR	80	Albert Connell	Sr
WR	80	Shannon Crenshaw	Fr
TE	83	Adren Dudley	Jr
OL	69	Koby Hackradt	Jr
RB	34	Dante Hall	Fr
RB	20	D'Andre Hardeman	So
QB	4	Thadd Hargett	Fr
WR	37	Donte Hawkins	So
OL	62	Semisi Heimuli	Fr
WR	88	Leroy Hodge	Fr
OL	79	Shea Holder	Fr
OL	68	Daniel Horn	So
OL	74	Brandon Houston	So
RB	25	Michael Jennings	Fr
QB	6	Shane Lechler	Fr
TE	84	Matt Mahone	So
OL	56	Toby McCarthy	Fr
QB	15	Randy McCown	Fr
OL	72	Steve McKinney	Jr
WR	1	Aaron Oliver	So
RB	8	Sirr Parker	So
OL	76	Chris Ruhman	Jr
OL	73	Cameron Spikes	So
TE	87	Derek Spiller	So
QB	7	Branndon Stewart	Jr
OL	53	Rex Tucker	So
OL	71	Chris Valetta	Fr
OL	78	Andy Vincent	Fr
RB	13	Michael Williams	So

Defense

Pos.	#	Name	Class
ILB	17	Ronnie Alexander	Fr
ILB	46	Cornelius Anthony	Fr
ILB	29	Quinton Brown	Jr
DB	48	Rich Coady	So
ILB	44	Sean Coryatt	Fr
DL	45	Brad Crowley	Jr
DB	18	Sedrick Curry	Fr
ILB	35	Dan Daniel	Fr
ILB	28	Trent Driver	Jr
DB	42	Paul Gage	Fr
DB	27	Donovan Greer	Sr
DL	97	Marcus Heard	Jr
OLB	43	Warrick Holdman	So
DB	21	Shun Horn	So
OLB	55	Jimmie Irby	Sr
DL	95	Edward Jasper	Sr
DB	30	Brandon Jennings	Fr
DB	5	Toya Jones	So
DL	92	Mike Kazmierski	Fr
CB	14	Justin Lucas	So
DL	98	David Maxwell	Jr
OLB	51	Phillip Meyers	Jr
DL	96	Brandon Mitchell	Sr
OLB	23	Keith Mitchell	Sr
ILB	9	Dat Nguyen	So
DB	36	Ronald Patton	Fr
DB	4	Michael Price	So
DL	94	Zerick Rollins	Jr
OLB	58	Chris Thierry	Fr
ILB	32	Larry Walker II	Jr
DB	39	Jason Webster	Fr
DB	26	Andre Williams	Sr
DL	99	Pat Williams	Sr
DB	38	Jeff Wilson	Fr
DB	40	Delvin Wright	Fr
DB	11	Sherrod Wyatt	Sr
DL	90	Stephen Young	Fr

Special teams

Pos.	#	Name	Class
K	3	Kyle Bryant	Jr
P	47	Bill Johnston	Jr
P	19	Shane Lechler	Fr
LS	63	Kyle Lednicky	So
K	41	Ryan Pillians	So
K	49	Manoli Venetoulias	Jr

Head coach

- R. C. Slocum (8th season)

Coordinators/assistant coaches

- Steve Ensminger – Offensive Coordinator
- Phil Bennett – Defensive Coordinator

Legend

- (C) Team captain
- (S) Suspended
- (I) Ineligible
- Injured
- Redshirt

Roster
Last update: 1996-11-19
