= Bob Simmons (American football coach) =

American football player and coach (1948–2026)

Biographical details
- Born: June 13, 1948; Livingston, Alabama, U.S.
- Died: June 9, 2026 (aged 77)

Playing career
- 1968–1970: Bowling Green
- Position: Linebacker

Coaching career (HC unless noted)
- 1976: Bowling Green (WR)
- 1977–1979: Toledo (OLB)
- 1980–1987: West Virginia (OLB)
- 1988–1991: Colorado (OLB)
- 1992–1994: Colorado (DL)
- 1995–2000: Oklahoma State
- 2002–2004: Notre Dame (LB)
- 2005–2007: Washington (TE/ST)
- 2013–2015: Boulder HS (CO)

Head coaching record
- Overall: 30–38 (college); 10–19 (high school)
- Bowls: 0–1

Accomplishments and honors

Awards
- Big 12 Coach of the Year (1997)

Bob Simmons (June 13, 1948 – June 9, 2026) was an American college football coach and player. He served as the head football coach at Oklahoma State University–Stillwater from 1995 to 2000, compiling a record of 30–38 and being named the Big 12 Conference Coach of the Year in 1997. In 2013, he was hired as the head football coach at Boulder High School in Boulder, Colorado.

Simmons died on June 9, 2026, at the age of 77.

== Head coaching record ==
=== College ===
| Year | Team | Overall | Conference | Standing | Bowl/playoffs | Coaches^{#} | AP^{°} |
|---|---|---|---|---|---|---|---|
Oklahoma State Cowboys (Big Eight Conference) (1995)
| 1995 | Oklahoma State | 4–8 | 2–5 | T–5th | | | |
Oklahoma State Cowboys (Big 12 Conference) (1996–2000)
| 1996 | Oklahoma State | 5–6 | 2–6 | 5th (South) | | | |
| 1997 | Oklahoma State | 8–4 | 5–3 | T–2nd (South) | L Alamo | 24 | 24 |
| 1998 | Oklahoma State | 5–6 | 3–5 | T–4th (South) | | | |
| 1999 | Oklahoma State | 5–6 | 3–5 | 5th (South) | | | |
| 2000 | Oklahoma State | 3–8 | 1–7 | 5th (South) | | | |
| Oklahoma State: | | 30–38 | 16–31 | | | | |
| Total: | | 30–38 | | | | | |
