= 1996 Kansas Jayhawks football team =

American college football season

1996 Kansas Jayhawks football
- Conference: Big 12 Conference
- North Division
- Record: 4–7 (2–6 Big 12)
- Head coach: Glen Mason (9th season)
- Offensive coordinator: Pat Ruel (9th season)
- Defensive coordinator: Mike Hankwitz (2nd season)
- Home stadium: Memorial Stadium

1996 Big 12 Conference football standings
	Conf.			Overall
Team	W		L	W		L
North Division
No. 6 Nebraska x%	8	–	0	11	–	2
No. 8 Colorado	7	–	1	10	–	2
No. 17 Kansas State	6	–	2	9	–	3
Missouri	3	–	5	5	–	6
Kansas	2	–	6	4	–	7
Iowa State	1	–	7	2	–	9
South Division
No. 23 Texas x$	6	–	2	8	–	5
Texas Tech	5	–	3	7	–	5
Texas A&M	4	–	4	6	–	6
Oklahoma	3	–	5	3	–	8
Oklahoma State	2	–	6	5	–	6
Baylor	1	–	7	4	–	7
Championship: Texas 37, Nebraska 27
x – Division champion/co-champions; $ – Bowl Alliance representative as champion % – Bowl Alliance at-large representative; Rankings from AP Poll

The 1996 Kansas Jayhawks football team represented the University of Kansas as a member of the North Division of the newly-=formed Big 12 Conference during the 1996 NCAA Division I-A football season. Led by Glen Mason in his ninth and final season as head coach, the Jayhawks compiled an overall record of 4–7 with a mark of 2–6 in conference play, placing fifth in the Big 12's North Division. The team played home games at Memorial Stadium in Lawrence, Kansas.

1996 was the Jayhawks' first season in the newly formed Big 12, which was formed from the eight schools from Big Eight Conference and four schools from Southwest Conference (SWC); both conferences dissolved following the 1995–96 academic year. Mason resigned at the end of the season to become the head football coach at the University of Minnesota.

== Schedule ==
Date	Time	Opponent	Rank	Site	TV	Result	Attendance
August 29	7:00 p.m.	Ball State*	No. 25	Memorial Stadium; Lawrence, KS		W 35–10	36,200
September 14	8:00 p.m.	at TCU*	No. 24	Amon G. Carter Stadium; Fort Worth, TX	ESPN2	W 52–17	37,512
September 28	8:00 p.m.	at Utah*	No. 20	Robert Rice Stadium; Salt Lake City, UT	ESPN2	L 42–45	32,519
October 5	11:30 a.m.	at Oklahoma		Oklahoma Memorial Stadium; Norman, OK	FSN	W 52–24	64,333
October 12	1:00 p.m.	Texas Tech		Memorial Stadium; Lawrence, KS		L 17–30	46,500
October 19	11:30 a.m.	No. 9 Colorado^{†}		Memorial Stadium; Lawrence, KS	FSN	L 7–20	48,500
October 26	6:00 p.m.	at No. 5 Nebraska		Memorial Stadium; Lincoln, NE (rivalry)	FSN	L 7–63	75,158
November 2	1:00 p.m.	at Iowa State		Cyclone Stadium; Ames, IA		W 34–31	37,850
November 9	1:00 p.m.	No. 13 Kansas State		Memorial Stadium; Lawrence, KS (rivalry)		L 12–38	48,800
November 16	11:30 a.m.	Texas		Memorial Stadium; Lawrence, KS	FSN	L 17–38	30,500
November 23	11:30 a.m.	at Missouri		Faurot Field; Columbia, MO (Border War)	FSN	L 25–42	36,821
*Non-conference game; ^{†}Homecoming; Rankings from AP Poll released prior to the game; All times are in Central time

== Rankings ==
Ranking movements Legend: ██ Increase in ranking ██ Decrease in ranking — = Not ranked RV = Received votes
	Week																	
Poll	Pre	1	2	3	4	5	6	7	8	9	10	11	12	13	14	15	16	Final
AP	24	25	RV	24	22	20	RV	RV	—	—	—	—	—	—	—	—	—	—
Coaches Poll	RV	RV	24	22	20	20	RV	RV	—	—	—	—	—	—	—	—	—	—

== Personnel ==
=== Coaching staff ===
Name	Position
Glen Mason	Head coach
Golden Pat Ruel	Offensive coordinator and offensive line
Mike Hankwitz	Defensive coordinator and inside linebackers
Dave Warner	Quarterbacks
Vic Adamle	Wide receivers
Mitch Browning	Tight ends
Reggie Mitchell	Running backs
David Gibbs	Defensive secondary
Dave Gillespie	Defensive line
Tim Phillips	Outside linebackers

=== Roster ===
1996 Kansas Jayhawks football roster
(starters in bold)
**Quarterbacks**: 7 Curtese Poole - Fr.; 8 **Ben Rutz** - Sr.; 14 Zac Wegner - RS-Fr.; 17 Hamilton Hill - So.; 18 **Matt Johner** - Jr.; **Running backs**: 20 **June Henley** - Sr; 25 Eric Vann - Jr.; 30 Eric Galbreath - Jr.; 32 Greg Davis - Fr.; 33 Paul Davis - Fr.-RS.; 34 **Mark Sanders** - Sr; 35 Julius Bruce - So.; 38 Charles Norris - Fr.-RS; 40 Tim Willis - Jr.; 44 Jonathan Macklin - So.; 88 Moran Norris - Fr.; **Wide receivers**: 1 **Isaac Byrd** - Sr.; 4 John Gordon - Fr.; 31 Luke Richesson - Sr.; 43 Tanner Hancock - Fr.; 80 **Andre Carter** - Sr.; 82 Chad Coellner - Fr.-RS; 86 Michael Chandler - Fr.-RS; **Tight ends**: 13 **Hosea Friday** - Sr.; 84 Brian Gray - So.; 85 Sean McDermott - Jr. and longsnapper; 89 **Jim Moore** - Sr.	**Offensive line** **Defensive line**	**Linebackers**: 46 **Ronnie Ward** - Sr.; 99 **Ron Warner** - Jr.; **Cornerbacks**: 28 **Tony Blevins** - Jr.; **Safeties** **Punters**: 41 **Dean Royal** - Jr.; **Kickers**: 15 Steffen Doelger - Fr.; 36 **Jeff McCord** - Jr.
