= 1996 Oklahoma State Cowboys football team =

College football season

1996 Oklahoma State Cowboys football
- Conference: Big 12 Conference
- South Division
- Record: 5–6 (2–6 Big 12)
- Head coach: Bob Simmons (2nd season)
- Offensive coordinator: Les Miles (2nd season)
- Defensive coordinator: Johnny Barr (1st season)
- Home stadium: Lewis Field

1996 Big 12 Conference football standings
	Conf.			Overall
Team	W		L	W		L
North Division
No. 6 Nebraska x%	8	–	0	11	–	2
No. 8 Colorado	7	–	1	10	–	2
No. 17 Kansas State	6	–	2	9	–	3
Missouri	3	–	5	5	–	6
Kansas	2	–	6	4	–	7
Iowa State	1	–	7	2	–	9
South Division
No. 23 Texas x$	6	–	2	8	–	5
Texas Tech	5	–	3	7	–	5
Texas A&M	4	–	4	6	–	6
Oklahoma	3	–	5	3	–	8
Oklahoma State	2	–	6	5	–	6
Baylor	1	–	7	4	–	7
Championship: Texas 37, Nebraska 27
x – Division champion/co-champions; $ – Bowl Alliance representative as champion % – Bowl Alliance at-large representative; Rankings from AP Poll

The 1996 Oklahoma State Cowboys football team represented Oklahoma State University as a member of the newly-formed Big 12 Conference during the 1996 NCAA Division I-A football season. Led by second-year head coach Bob Simmons, the Cowboys compiled an overall record of 5–6 with a mark of 2–6 in conference play, placing fifth in the Big 12's South Division. Oklahoma State played home games at Lewis Field in Stillwater, Oklahoma.

The Cowboys' victory against Southwest Missouri State in the season opener was NCAA Division I college football's first ever regular season game to finish in overtime.

== Schedule ==
Date	Time	Opponent	Site	TV	Result	Attendance	Source
August 31	6:00 p.m.	Southwest Missouri State*	Lewis Field; Stillwater, OK		W 23–20 ^{OT}	33,500	
September 7	11:30 a.m.	at Texas Tech	Texas Stadium; Irving, TX	FSN	L 3–31	30,269	
September 14	6:00 p.m.	Tulsa*	Lewis Field; Stillwater, OK (rivalry)		W 30–9	44,800	
September 21	6:00 p.m.	Utah State*	Lewis Field; Stillwater, OK		W 31–17	37,000	
October 5	6:00 p.m.	at No. 23 Texas	Darrell K Royal–Texas Memorial Stadium; Austin, TX	FSN	L 14–71	67,414	
October 12	9:00 p.m.	at No. 9 Colorado	Folsom Field; Boulder, CO	FSN	L 13–35	53,005	
October 19	2:00 p.m.	Iowa State^{†}	Lewis Field; Stillwater, OK		W 28–27	40,000	
October 26	1:00 p.m.	at Missouri	Faurot Field; Columbia, MO		L 28–35 ^{OT}	37,879	
November 2	2:00 p.m.	Texas A&M	Lewis Field; Stillwater, OK		L 19–38	41,250	
November 9	11:30 a.m.	Oklahoma	Lewis Field; Stillwater, OK (Bedlam Series)	FSN	L 17–27	51,416	
November 23	2:00 p.m.	Baylor	Lewis Field; Stillwater, Ok		W 37–17	21,000	
*Non-conference game; ^{†}Homecoming; Rankings from AP Poll released prior to the game; All times are in Central time

== Roster ==
1996 Oklahoma State Cowboys football team roster
Players
Coaches
Offense

Pos.	#	Name	Class
TE	85	Alonzo Mayes	Jr
OL	70	Jeremy Offutt	So
TE	16	Roger Pfieffer	Sr
QB	11	Joe Phears	Jr
WR	27	Alvin Porter	Fr
RB	25	Andre Richardson	Jr
WR	3	Terrance Richardson	So
RB	1	Nathan Simmons	Fr
DB	9	John Warren	Fr
QB	13	Rodney Smith	Fr
TE	86	Garrett Steggs	Fr
RB	24	Eric Steveson	Fr

Defense

Pos.	#	Name	Class
LB	2	Louis Adams	Sr
DB	31	Chris Carter	Fr
LB	22	Raymond Cato	Fr
DB	17	R. W. McQuarters	So

Special teams

Pos.	#	Name	Class

Head coach

- Bob Simmons

Coordinators/assistant coaches

Legend

- (C) Team captain
- (S) Suspended
- (I) Ineligible
- Injured
- Redshirt

Roster
