= 1996 Missouri Tigers football team =

American college football season

1996 Missouri Tigers football
- Conference: Big 12 Conference
- North Division
- Record: 5–6 (3–5 Big 12)
- Head coach: Larry Smith (3rd season)
- Offensive coordinator: Jerry Berndt (3rd season)
- Defensive coordinator: Moe Ankney (3rd season)
- Home stadium: Faurot Field

1996 Big 12 Conference football standings
	Conf.			Overall
Team	W		L	W		L
North Division
No. 6 Nebraska x%	8	–	0	11	–	2
No. 8 Colorado	7	–	1	10	–	2
No. 17 Kansas State	6	–	2	9	–	3
Missouri	3	–	5	5	–	6
Kansas	2	–	6	4	–	7
Iowa State	1	–	7	2	–	9
South Division
No. 23 Texas x$	6	–	2	8	–	5
Texas Tech	5	–	3	7	–	5
Texas A&M	4	–	4	6	–	6
Oklahoma	3	–	5	3	–	8
Oklahoma State	2	–	6	5	–	6
Baylor	1	–	7	4	–	7
Championship: Texas 37, Nebraska 27
x – Division champion/co-champions; $ – Bowl Alliance representative as champion % – Bowl Alliance at-large representative; Rankings from AP Poll

The 1996 Missouri Tigers football team represented the University of Missouri during the 1996 NCAA Division I-A football season. They played their home games at Faurot Field in Columbia, Missouri. They were members of the Big 12 Conference in the North Division. The team was coached by head coach Larry Smith.

== Schedule ==
Date	Time	Opponent	Site	TV	Result	Attendance	Source
August 31	7:00 pm	at No. 8 Texas	Darrell K Royal–Texas Memorial Stadium; Austin, TX	FSN	L 10–40	70,613	
September 14	7:00 pm	Memphis*	Faurot Field; Columbia, MO		L 16–19	41,543	
September 21	6:00 pm	Clemson*	Faurot Field; Columbia, MO	FSN	W 38–24	39,128	
September 28	1:00 pm	at Iowa State	Cyclone Stadium; Ames, IA (rivalry)		L 31–45	44,941	
October 3	7:00 pm	at SMU*	Cotton Bowl; Dallas, TX		W 27–26	23,132	
October 12	1:00 pm	No. 22 Kansas State	Faurot Field; Columbia, MO		L 10–35	45,211	
October 26	1:00 pm	Oklahoma State^{†}	Faurot Field; Columbia, MO		W 35–28 ^{OT}	37,879	
November 2	1:00 pm	No. 7 Colorado	Faurot Field; Columbia, MO	PPV	L 13–41	34,440	
November 9	1:00 pm	at No. 5 Nebraska	Memorial Stadium; Lincoln, NE (rivalry)		L 7–51	75,133	
November 16	1:00 pm	at Baylor	Floyd Casey Stadium; Waco, TX		W 49–42 ^{3OT}	22,705	
November 23	11:30 am	Kansas	Faurot Field; Columbia, MO (Border War)	FSN	W 42–25	36,821	
*Non-conference game; ^{†}Homecoming; Rankings from AP Poll released prior to the game; All times are in Central time

== Roster ==
1996 Missouri Tigers football team roster
Players
Coaches
Offense

Pos.	#	Name	Class
QB	7	Corby Jones	So
RB	27	Brock Olivo	Jr
OT	57	Craig Heimburger	So
WR	80	Torey Coleman	Jr
WR	81	Jay Murchison	Jr

Defense

Pos.	#	Name	Class
CB	5	Shad Criss	Jr
LB	39	Barry Odom	Fr

Special teams

Pos.	#	Name	Class

Head coach

- Larry Smith

Coordinators/assistant coaches

- Jerry Berndt – Offensive coordinator & quarterbacks
- Curtis Jones – Running backs & defensive line
- Andy Hill – Wide receivers
- Harry Hiestand – Offensive line
- Andy Moeller – offensive tackle, tight end & special teams coordinator
- Moe Ankney – Defensive coordinator
- Ricky Hunley – Defensive line & linebackers
- Jon Hoke – Defensive backs
- Skip Hall – assistant

Legend

- (C) Team captain
- (S) Suspended
- (I) Ineligible
- Injured
- Redshirt

Roster
Last update: 1996-12-21
