= Jamel Williams =

American football player (born 1973)

No. 22, 28
- Position: Safety

Personal information
- Born: December 22, 1973 (age 52); Gary, Indiana, U.S.
- Listed height: 6 ft 0 in (1.83 m)
- Listed weight: 205 lb (93 kg)

Career information
- High school: Merrillville (IN)
- College: Nebraska
- NFL draft: 1997: 5th round, 132nd overall pick

Career history
- Washington Redskins (1997–1999); Green Bay Packers (1999); Las Vegas Outlaws (2001)

Awards and highlights
- 2× National champion (1994, 1995)

Career NFL statistics
- Tackles: 24
- Stats at Pro Football Reference

Jamel Ishmael Williams (born December 22, 1973) is an American former professional football player who was a safety in the National Football League (NFL) for the Washington Redskins. He also played in the XFL for the Las Vegas Outlaws. He played college football at the University of Nebraska–Lincoln and was selected in the fifth round of the 1997 NFL draft.

== Early life ==
Williams was born in Gary, Indiana and attended Merrillville High School in Merrillville, Indiana. While at Merrillville, he played high school football, basketball, and participated in track and field. In football, Williams was a four-year letterman and helped lead Merrillville to a Class 5A regional title as he scored 45 touchdowns and rushed for 3,238 yards (5.7 per carry) in his high school career.

== College career ==
Williams attended and played college football from 1994 to 1996 for the Nebraska Cornhuskers. After sitting out during his freshman season, he helped Nebraska go undefeated in 1994 on their way to the National Title. Williams again helped the Cornhuskers go undefeated in 1995, with Nebraska securing a spot in the national title game against the Florida Gators in the 1996 Fiesta Bowl. During that game, Williams sacked Florida QB Danny Wuerffel for a safety early in the second quarter, part of a 29-point explosion by the Huskers. Nebraska went on to win 62–24, securing their second national title in a row. Nebraska's record during William's three years was 36–2.

== Professional career ==
Williams was selected in the fifth round of the 1997 NFL draft by the Washington Redskins, and played there from 1997 to 1999. He later played in the XFL for the Las Vegas Outlaws in 2001. Williams won the XFL's first opening scramble, used to determine which team would receive the opening kickoff instead of a coin toss, defeating Donnie Caldwell of the New York/New Jersey Hitmen.
