= Zerick Rollins =

American football player and coach (born 1975)

Personal information
- Born: June 20, 1975 (age 51); Houston, Texas, U.S.

Career information
- Position: Defensive lineman
- College: Texas A&M (1994–1997)

Career history
- Texas A&M (1998–2000) Graduate assistant; Seattle Seahawks (2001) Assistant defensive line coach; Seattle Seahawks (2002–2005) Defensive line coach; Seattle Seahawks (2006–2009) Linebackers coach

Zerick Rollins Sr. (born June 20, 1975) is an American football coach. He played college football at Texas A&M.

Zerick was a two-year starter at Texas A&M (1996–1997) where he helped the Aggies win the Big 12 South title in 1997. He also played in the 1998 Cotton Bowl against UCLA.

Zerick graduated from Texas A&M with a degree in economics and also earned a master's degree in Educational Administration, while also serving as a graduate assistant (1998–2000). Rollins started his career with the Seattle Seahawks, as a defensive line assistant in 2001. He was promoted to defensive line coach from 2002 to 2005. Rollins coached linebackers from 2006 to 2009 for the Seahawks. On January 16, 2010, it was announced by The Olympian that Rollins will not be offered a position on newly hired, Pete Carroll's staff.
