= Barron Tanner =

American football player (born 1973)

No. 72, 92
- Position: Defensive tackle

Personal information
- Born: September 14, 1973 (age 53); Athens, Texas, U.S.
- Listed height: 6 ft 3 in (1.91 m)
- Listed weight: 360 lb (163 kg)

Career information
- High school: Athens
- College: Oklahoma
- NFL draft: 1997: 5th round, 149th overall pick

Career history
- Miami Dolphins (1997–1998); Washington Redskins (1999); Arizona Cardinals (2000–2003)

Career NFL statistics
- Tackles: 118
- Sacks: 3
- Forced fumbles: 1
- Stats at Pro Football Reference

Barron Keith Tanner (born September 14, 1973) is an American former professional football player who was a defensive tackle in the National Football League (NFL) for the Miami Dolphins, Arizona Cardinals, and Washington Redskins. He played college football for the Oklahoma Sooners and was selected in the fifth round of the 1997 NFL draft.
