= 1996 Texas Tech Red Raiders football team =

American college football season

1996 Texas Tech Red Raiders football

Alamo Bowl, L 0–27 vs. Iowa
- Conference: Big 12 Conference
- South Division
- Record: 7–5 (5–3 Big 12)
- Head coach: Spike Dykes (10th season)
- Offensive coordinator: Rick Dykes (1st season)
- Offensive scheme: Spread
- Defensive coordinator: John Goodner (2nd season)
- Base defense: 4–2–5/4–4 hybrid
- Home stadium: Jones Stadium

1996 Big 12 Conference football standings
	Conf.			Overall
Team	W		L	W		L
North Division
No. 6 Nebraska x%	8	–	0	11	–	2
No. 8 Colorado	7	–	1	10	–	2
No. 17 Kansas State	6	–	2	9	–	3
Missouri	3	–	5	5	–	6
Kansas	2	–	6	4	–	7
Iowa State	1	–	7	2	–	9
South Division
No. 23 Texas x$	6	–	2	8	–	5
Texas Tech	5	–	3	7	–	5
Texas A&M	4	–	4	6	–	6
Oklahoma	3	–	5	3	–	8
Oklahoma State	2	–	6	5	–	6
Baylor	1	–	7	4	–	7
Championship: Texas 37, Nebraska 27
x – Division champion/co-champions; $ – Bowl Alliance representative as champion % – Bowl Alliance at-large representative; Rankings from AP Poll

The 1996 Texas Tech Red Raiders football team represented Texas Tech University as a member of the newly formed Big 12 Conference during the 1996 NCAA Division I-A football season. In their tenth season under head coach Spike Dykes, the Red Raiders compiled a 7–5 record (5–3 against Big 12 opponents), finished in second place in Southern Division of the Big 12, outscored opponents by a combined total of 323 to 232, and lost to Iowa in the 1996 Alamo Bowl. The team played its home games at Clifford B. and Audrey Jones Stadium in Lubbock, Texas.

== Schedule ==
Date	Time	Opponent	Site	TV	Result	Attendance	Source
August 31	2:30 pm	at No. 21 Kansas State	KSU Stadium; Manhattan, KS	ABC	L 14–21	43,143	
September 7	11:30 am	vs. Oklahoma State	Texas Stadium; Irving, TX	FSN	W 31–3	30,269	
September 21	5:30 pm	at Georgia*	Sanford Stadium; Athens, GA	ESPN2	L 12–15	73,116	
September 28	6:30 pm	Utah State*	Jones Stadium; Lubbock, TX		W 58–20	39,778	
October 5	6:30 pm	Baylor^{†}	Jones Stadium; Lubbock, TX (rivalry)		W 45–24	50,594	
October 12	1:00 pm	at Kansas	Memorial Stadium; Lawrence, KS		W 30–17	48,500	
October 19	2:30 pm	No. 5 Nebraska	Jones Stadium; Lubbock, TX	ABC	L 10–24	51,344	
October 26	11:30 am	at Texas A&M	Kyle Field; College Station, TX (rivalry)	FSN	W 13–10	70,147	
November 9	6:00 pm	Texas	Jones Stadium; Lubbock, TX (rivalry)	FSN	L 32–38	50,607	
November 16	1:00 pm	Southwestern Louisiana*	Jones Stadium; Lubbock, TX		W 56–21	38,097	
November 23	2:30 pm	at Oklahoma	Oklahoma Memorial Stadium; Norman, OK	ABC	W 22–12	61,127	
December 29	7:00 pm	vs. No. 21 Iowa*	Alamodome; San Antonio, TX (Alamo Bowl)	ESPN	L 0–27	55,677	
*Non-conference game; ^{†}Homecoming; Rankings from AP Poll released prior to the game; All times are in Central time

== Game summaries ==
=== At Kansas State ===
	1	2	3	4	Total
Red Raiders	3	0	0	11	14
No. 21 Wildcats	0	14	0	7	21

=== Vs. Oklahoma State ===
	1	2	3	4	Total
Cowboys	0	0	3	0	3
Red Raiders	10	12	0	9	31

=== At Georgia ===
	1	2	3	4	Total
Red Raiders	0	6	6	0	12
Bulldogs	0	7	0	8	15

=== Utah State ===
	1	2	3	4	Total
Aggies	7	6	7	0	20
Red Raiders	14	14	16	14	58

=== Baylor ===
	1	2	3	4	Total
Bears	0	10	7	7	24
Red Raiders	14	17	7	7	45

=== At Kansas ===
	1	2	3	4	Total
Red Raiders	7	0	7	16	30
Jayhawks	7	10	0	0	17

=== Nebraska ===
	1	2	3	4	Total
No. 5 Cornhuskers	7	3	7	7	24
Red Raiders	7	3	0	0	10

=== At Texas A&M ===
	1	2	3	4	Total
Red Raiders	3	3	0	7	13
Aggies	0	3	7	0	10

=== Texas ===
	1	2	3	4	Total
Longhorns	14	14	7	3	38
Red Raiders	3	8	14	7	32

=== Southwestern Louisiana ===
	1	2	3	4	Total
Ragin' Cajuns	0	7	7	7	21
Red Raiders	0	28	7	21	56

=== At Oklahoma ===
	1	2	3	4	Total
Red Raiders	0	0	16	6	22
Sooners	0	3	0	9	12

=== Vs. Iowa (Alamo Bowl) ===
	1	2	3	4	Total
Red Raiders	0	0	0	0	0
No. 21 Hawkeyes	6	11	0	10	27

== Roster ==
1996 Texas Tech Red Raiders football team roster
Players			Coaches
Offense 60 Jayson Hansen OG 6-4 297 Jr. Kelowna, B.C. 4 Byron Hanspard TB 6-0 193 Jr. DeSoto, Texas 82 Donnie Hart SE 6-1 187 So. 17 Malcolm McKenzie SE 6-2 211 Jr. San Antonio, Texas 6 Stacy Mitchell FL 5-5 150 Jr. DeSoto, Texas 42 Sammy Morris FB 6-0 212 Fr. San Antonio, Texas David Nichol WR 5-10 182 Fr. Dallas, Texas *Ahndre Patterson TE 6-4 250 Jr 78 J.T. Sprouse OG 6-2 286 Sr. Simi Valley, Calif. 16 Matt Tittle QB 6-3 209 So: Pos. / # / Name / Class; TE / 85 / Brad Spinks / Sr	Defense William Culpepper LB 6-0 222 Fr. Cleburne, Texas 46 Keith Cumby DE 5-10 209 So. Van, Texas 86 Tony Daniels DE 6-5 249 Jr. Odessa, Texas 11 Tony Darden CB 6-0 196 Jr: Pos. / # / Name / Class	Special teams: Pos. / # / Name / Class	Head coach: Spike Dykes; Coordinators/assistant coaches Legend: (C) Team captain; (S) Suspended; (I) Ineligible; Injured; Redshirt; Roster
