= 1996 Kansas State Wildcats football team =

American college football season

1996 Kansas State Wildcats football

Cotton Bowl Classic, L 15–19 vs. BYU
- Conference: Big 12 Conference
- North Division

Ranking
- Coaches: No. 17
- AP: No. 17
- Record: 9–3 (6–2 Big 12)
- Head coach: Bill Snyder (8th season)
- Offensive coordinator: Dana Dimel (2nd season)
- Offensive scheme: Pro-style
- Co-defensive coordinators: Bob Cope (1st season); Mike Stoops (1st season)
- Base defense: 4–3
- Home stadium: KSU Stadium

1996 Big 12 Conference football standings
	Conf.			Overall
Team	W		L	W		L
North Division
No. 6 Nebraska x%	8	–	0	11	–	2
No. 8 Colorado	7	–	1	10	–	2
No. 17 Kansas State	6	–	2	9	–	3
Missouri	3	–	5	5	–	6
Kansas	2	–	6	4	–	7
Iowa State	1	–	7	2	–	9
South Division
No. 23 Texas x$	6	–	2	8	–	5
Texas Tech	5	–	3	7	–	5
Texas A&M	4	–	4	6	–	6
Oklahoma	3	–	5	3	–	8
Oklahoma State	2	–	6	5	–	6
Baylor	1	–	7	4	–	7
Championship: Texas 37, Nebraska 27
x – Division champion/co-champions; $ – Bowl Alliance representative as champion % – Bowl Alliance at-large representative; Rankings from AP Poll

The 1996 Kansas State Wildcats football team represented Kansas State University as a member of the North Division of the newly-formed Big 12 Conference during the 1996 NCAA Division I-A football season. Led by eighth-year head coach Bill Snyder, the Wildcats compiled an overall record of 9–3 with a mark of 6–2 in conference play, placing third in the Big 12's North Division. Kansas's State season ended with a loss against fifth-ranked BYU in the Cotton Bowl Classic—the program's first appearance in a traditional New Year's Day bowl game. The team played home games at KSU Stadium in Manhattan, Kansas.

1996 was the first year of competition for the Big 12 Conference, and Kansas State's season opener against Texas Tech on August 31 was the first athletic event in Big 12 history.

== Schedule ==
Date	Time	Opponent	Rank	Site	TV	Result	Attendance
August 31	2:30 p.m.	Texas Tech	No. 21	KSU Stadium; Manhattan, KS	ABC	W 21–14	43,143
September 7	1:10 p.m.	Indiana State*	No. 21	KSU Stadium; Manhattan, KS		W 59–3	40,724
September 14	1:10 p.m.	Cincinnati*	No. 17	KSU Stadium; Manhattan, KS		W 35–0	43,111
September 21	7:00 p.m.	at Rice*	No. 16	Rice Stadium; Houston, TX		W 34–7	19,700
October 5	2:30 p.m.	No. 7 Nebraska	No. 16	KSU Stadium; Manhattan, KS (rivalry)	ABC	L 3–39	43,916
October 12	1:00 p.m.	at Missouri	No. 22	Faurot Field; Columbia, MO		W 35–10	45,211
October 19	6:00 p.m.	at Texas A&M	No. 21	Kyle Field; College Station, TX	FSN	W 23–20	64,155
October 26	1:10 p.m.	Oklahoma	No. 16	KSU Stadium; Manhattan, KS		W 42–35	43,815
November 9	1:00 p.m.	at Kansas	No. 13	Memorial Stadium; Lawrence, KS (rivalry)		W 38–12	48,800
November 16	6:00 p.m.	at No. 6 Colorado	No. 9	Folsom Field; Boulder, CO (rivalry)	FSN	L 0–12	53,500
November 23	6:10 p.m.	Iowa State^{†}	No. 14	KSU Stadium; Manhattan, KS (rivalry)	FSN	W 35–20	43,174
January 1	1:30 p.m.	vs. No. 5 BYU*	No. 14	Cotton Bowl; Dallas, TX (Cotton Bowl Classic)	CBS	L 15–19	71,928
*Non-conference game; ^{†}Homecoming; Rankings from AP Poll released prior to the game; All times are in Central time

== Rankings ==
Ranking movements Legend: ██ Increase in ranking ██ Decrease in ranking — = Not ranked
	Week																	
Poll	Pre	1	2	3	4	5	6	7	8	9	10	11	12	13	14	15	16	Final
AP	21	21	21	17	16	16	16	22	21	16	14	13	9	14	14	14	14	17
Coaches	18	—	15	14	14	13	12	21	19	14	12	11	9	16	16	15	14	17

== Game summaries ==
=== Texas Tech ===
Texas Tech at Kansas State

Team	1	2	3	4	Total
Texas Tech	3	0	0	11	14
• Kansas State	0	14	0	7	21

- Date: August 31
- Location: KSU Stadium, Manhattan, Kansas
- Game start: 2:30 pm CST
- Game attendance: 43,143
- Television network: ABC

=== Nebraska ===
Nebraska at Kansas State

Team	1	2	3	4	Total
• Nebraska	6	12	14	7	39
Kansas State	0	3	0	0	3

- Date: October 5
- Location: KSU Stadium, Manhattan, Kansas
- Game start: 11:30 am CST
- Game attendance: 43,916
- Television network: ABC

=== At Texas A&M ===
Kansas State at Texas A&M

Team	1	2	3	4	Total
• No. 19 Kansas State	13	7	3	0	23
Texas A&M	3	7	0	10	20

- Date: October 19
- Location: Kyle Field, College Station, Texas
- Game start: 6:00 pm CST
- Game attendance: 64,155
- Television network: FSN

=== Vs. BYU (Cotton Bowl Classic) ===
No. 14 Kansas State at No. 5 BYU

Team	1	2	3	4	Total
No. 14 Kansas State	0	8	7	0	15
• No. 5 BYU	5	0	0	14	19

- Date: January 1
- Location: Cotton Bowl, Dallas, Texas
- Game start: 1:30 pm CST
- Game attendance: 71,928
- Television network: CBS

== Roster ==
1996 Kansas State Wildcats football team roster
Players
Coaches
Offense

Pos.	#	Name	Class
RB	33	David Allen	Fr
WR	25	Andre Anderson	Jr
WR	22	Jimmy Dean	Sr
RB	24	Eric Hickson	Jr
C	64	Jason Johnson	Sr
WR	83	Kevin Lockett	Sr
TE	86	Justin Swift	So
OT	58	Todd Weiner	Jr
OT	76	Ryan Young	So

Defense

Pos.	#	Name	Class
DT	90	Kenneth Bouie	Jr
DE	94	Da'Von Brame	Fr
DE	53	Mike Bush	So
CB	2	Chris Canty	Jr
DL	91	Pat Curry	Fr
CB	29	Demetric Denmark	Jr
DB	14	Edwin Lin Dotson	Fr
DT	98	Jerome Evans	Jr
LB	8	DeShawn Fogle	Sr
LB	42	Mark Simoneau	Fr

Special teams

Pos.	#	Name	Class
K	38	Martin Gramatica	So

Head coach

- Bill Snyder

Coordinators/assistant coaches

- Dana Dimel – Offensive Coordinator
- Ron Hudson – Passing game Coordinator & quarterbacks
- Greg Peterson – Wide receivers
- Larry Kramer – Tight ends & Special Teams Coordinator
- Mike Stoops – co-Defensive Coordinator & defensive ends
- Bob Cope – co-Defensive Coordinator
- Mo Latimore – interior Defensive line
- Brent Venables – Linebackers
- Mark Mangino – Recruiting Game Coordinator

Legend

- (C) Team captain
- (S) Suspended
- (I) Ineligible
- Injured
- Redshirt

Roster
