= Jon Hesse =

American football player (born 1973)

No. 53, 50
- Position: Linebacker

Personal information
- Born: June 6, 1973 (age 53); Lincoln, Nebraska, U.S.
- Listed height: 6 ft 4 in (1.93 m)
- Listed weight: 250 lb (113 kg)

Career information
- High school: Lincoln Southeast
- College: Nebraska
- NFL draft: 1997: 7th round, 221st overall pick

Career history
- Jacksonville Jaguars (1997)*; Green Bay Packers (1997)*; Denver Broncos (1997)*; Oakland Raiders (1998)*; St. Louis Rams (1998); Scottish Claymores (1999-2000); Atlanta Falcons (2000)*
- * Offseason or practice squad member only

Awards and highlights
- 2× National champion (1994, 1995)

Career NFL statistics
- Games played: 5
- Stats at Pro Football Reference

Jonathan Andrew Hesse (born June 6, 1973) is an American former professional football player who was a linebacker in the National Football League (NFL). He played college football for the Nebraska Cornhuskers and was selected by the Jacksonville Jaguars in the seventh round of the 1997 NFL draft with the 221st overall pick. He would play linebacker with the St. Louis Rams in 1998. He also was included on the Denver Broncos Super Bowl XXXII roster following the 1997 NFL season.
