= 1996 Texas Longhorns football team =

American college football season

1996 Texas Longhorns football

Big 12 champion Big 12 South champion

Big 12 Championship Game, W 37–27 vs. Nebraska

Fiesta Bowl, L 15–38 vs. Penn State
- Conference: Big 12 Conference
- South Division

Ranking
- Coaches: No. 23
- AP: No. 23
- Record: 8–5 (6–2 Big 12)
- Head coach: John Mackovic (5th season)
- Offensive coordinator: Gene Dahlquist (5th season)
- Defensive coordinator: Gary Darnell (3rd season)
- Home stadium: Darrell K Royal–Texas Memorial Stadium

1996 Big 12 Conference football standings
	Conf.			Overall
Team	W		L	W		L
North Division
No. 6 Nebraska x%	8	–	0	11	–	2
No. 8 Colorado	7	–	1	10	–	2
No. 17 Kansas State	6	–	2	9	–	3
Missouri	3	–	5	5	–	6
Kansas	2	–	6	4	–	7
Iowa State	1	–	7	2	–	9
South Division
No. 23 Texas x$	6	–	2	8	–	5
Texas Tech	5	–	3	7	–	5
Texas A&M	4	–	4	6	–	6
Oklahoma	3	–	5	3	–	8
Oklahoma State	2	–	6	5	–	6
Baylor	1	–	7	4	–	7
Championship: Texas 37, Nebraska 27
x – Division champion/co-champions; $ – Bowl Alliance representative as champion % – Bowl Alliance at-large representative; Rankings from AP Poll

The 1996 Texas Longhorns football team represented the University of Texas at Austin as a member South Division of the newly-formed Big 12 Conference during the 1996 NCAA Division I-A football season. Led by fifth-year head coach John Mackovic, the Longhorns compiled an overall record of 8–5 with a mark of 6–2 in conference play, winning the Big 12's South Division title. Texas advanced to the Big 12 Championship Game, where the Longhorns upset Nebraska to secure the Big 12 Conference title. Texas was invited to the Fiesta Bowl, losing there to Penn State. The team played home games at Darrell K Royal–Texas Memorial Stadium in Austin, Texas.

== Schedule ==
Date	Time	Opponent	Rank	Site	TV	Result	Attendance	Source
August 31	7:00 p.m.	Missouri	No. 8	Darrell K Royal–Texas Memorial Stadium; Austin, TX	FSN	W 40–10	70,613	
September 7	6:00 p.m.	New Mexico State*	No. 8	Darrell K Royal–Texas Memorial Stadium; Austin, TX	PPV	W 41–7	69,762	
September 21	11:00 a.m.	No. 9 Notre Dame*	No. 6	Darrell K Royal–Texas Memorial Stadium; Austin, TX	ABC	L 24–27	83,312	
September 28	6:30 p.m.	at No. 19 Virginia*	No. 13	Scott Stadium; Charlottesville, VA	ESPN	L 13–37	45,100	
October 5	6:00 p.m.	Oklahoma State	No. 23	Darrell K Royal–Texas Memorial Stadium; Austin, TX	FSN	W 71–14	67,414	
October 12	2:30 p.m.	vs. Oklahoma	No. 25	Cotton Bowl; Dallas, TX (Red River Shootout)	ABC	L 27–30 ^{OT}	75,587	
October 26	1:30 p.m.	at No. 8 Colorado		Folsom Field; Boulder, CO	ABC	L 24–28	51,100	
November 2	2:30 p.m.	Baylor		Darrell K Royal–Texas Memorial Stadium; Austin, TX (rivalry)	ABC	W 28–23	75,482	
November 9	6:00 p.m.	at Texas Tech		Jones Stadium; Lubbock, TX (rivalry)	FSN	W 38–32	50,607	
November 16	11:30 a.m.	at Kansas		Memorial Stadium; Lawrence, KS	FSN	W 38–17	30,500	
November 29	10:00 a.m.	Texas A&M		Darrell K Royal–Texas Memorial Stadium; Austin, TX (rivalry)	ABC	W 51–15	81,887	
December 7	12:00 p.m.	vs. No. 3 Nebraska		Trans World Dome; St. Louis, MO (Big 12 Championship Game)	ABC	W 37–27	63,109	
January 1, 1997	7:30 p.m.	vs. No. 7 Penn State*	No. 20	Sun Devil Stadium; Tempe, AZ (Fiesta Bowl)	CBS	L 15–38	65,106	
*Non-conference game; Rankings from AP Poll released prior to the game; All times are in Central time

== Game summaries ==
=== Vs. Nebraska ===
Nebraska vs Texas

Team	1	2	3	4	Total
Cornhuskers	7	10	7	3	27
• Longhorns	7	13	3	14	37

- Date: December 7
- Location: Trans World Dome, St. Louis, Missouri
- Game attendance: 63,109

== Roster ==
1996 Texas Longhorns football team roster
Players
Coaches
Offense

Pos.	#	Name	Class
G	79	Ben Adams	So
WR	83	Mike Adams	Sr
QB	5	James Brown	Jr
RB	33	Priest Holmes	Sr
WR	8	Wane McGarity	So
G	69	Dan Neil	Sr
QB	9	Ryan O'Neill	So
C	63	Blake Powers	Jr
OL	66	Cory Quye	Fr
WR	22	Michael Watson	So
WR	1	John White	So
RB	11	Ricky Williams	So
QB	13	Bryan Willingham	Fr

Defense

Pos.	#	Name	Class
NG	96	Chris Akins	Jr
CB	2	Taje Allen	Sr
FS	16	Chris Carter	Sr
CB	30	Bryant Westbrook	Sr

Special teams

Pos.	#	Name	Class
PK	4	Phil Dawson	Jr

Head coach

- John Mackovic

Coordinators/assistant coaches

- Rusty Whitt (GA)

Legend

- (C) Team captain
- (S) Suspended
- (I) Ineligible
- Injured
- Redshirt

Roster
Last update: 1997-01-26
