= 1996 Iowa State Cyclones football team =

American college football season

1996 Iowa State Cyclones football
- Conference: Big 12 Conference
- North Division
- Record: 2–9 (1–7 Big 12)
- Head coach: Dan McCarney (2nd season)
- Offensive coordinator: Steve Loney (2nd season)
- Offensive scheme: Pro set
- Defensive coordinator: Larry Coyer (2nd season)
- Base defense: 4–3
- Home stadium: Cyclone Stadium

1996 Big 12 Conference football standings
| | Conf. | | | Overall |
| Team | W | | L | W | | L |
|---|---|---|---|---|---|---|
North Division
| No. 6 Nebraska x% | 8 | – | 0 | 11 | – | 2 |
| No. 8 Colorado | 7 | – | 1 | 10 | – | 2 |
| No. 17 Kansas State | 6 | – | 2 | 9 | – | 3 |
| Missouri | 3 | – | 5 | 5 | – | 6 |
| Kansas | 2 | – | 6 | 4 | – | 7 |
| Iowa State | 1 | – | 7 | 2 | – | 9 |
South Division
| No. 23 Texas x$ | 6 | – | 2 | 8 | – | 5 |
| Texas Tech | 5 | – | 3 | 7 | – | 5 |
| Texas A&M | 4 | – | 4 | 6 | – | 6 |
| Oklahoma | 3 | – | 5 | 3 | – | 8 |
| Oklahoma State | 2 | – | 6 | 5 | – | 6 |
| Baylor | 1 | – | 7 | 4 | – | 7 |
Championship: Texas 37, Nebraska 27
x – Division champion/co-champions; $ – Bowl Alliance representative as champion % – Bowl Alliance at-large representative; Rankings from AP Poll

The 1996 Iowa State Cyclones football team represented Iowa State University as a member of the North Division in the newly-formed Big 12 Conference during the 1996 NCAA Division I-A football season. Led by second-year head coach Dan McCarney, the Cyclones compiled an overall record of 2–9 with a mark of 1–7 in conference play, placing last out of six teams in the Big 12's North Division. Iowa State played home games at Cyclone Stadium in Ames, Iowa.

== Schedule ==
| Date | Time | Opponent | Site | TV | Result | Attendance | Source |
|---|---|---|---|---|---|---|---|
| September 7 | 6:00 p.m. | Wyoming* | Cyclone Stadium; Ames, IA | FSN | L 38–41 ^{OT} | 44,511 | |
| September 14 | 2:30 p.m. | at No. 21 Iowa* | Kinnick Stadium; Iowa City, IA (rivalry) | ABC | L 13–38 | 70,397 | |
| September 21 | 1:00 p.m. | No. 3 (I-AA) Northern Iowa* | Cyclone Stadium; Ames, IA | | W 42–23 | 40,122 | |
| September 28 | 1:00 p.m. | Missouri^{†} | Cyclone Stadium; Ames, IA (rivalry) | | W 45–31 | 44,941 | |
| October 12 | 11:30 a.m. | Texas A&M | Cyclone Stadium; Ames, IA | FSN | L 21–24 | 44,950 | |
| October 19 | 2:00 p.m. | at Oklahoma State | Lewis Field; Stillwater, OK | | L 27–28 | 40,000 | |
| October 26 | 1:00 p.m. | at Baylor | Floyd Casey Stadium; Waco, TX | | L 21–49 | 35,114 | |
| November 2 | 1:00 p.m. | Kansas | Cyclone Stadium; Ames, IA | | L 31–34 | 37,850 | |
| November 9 | 1:30 p.m. | at No. 7 Colorado | Folsom Field; Boulder, CO | | L 42–49 | 49,662 | |
| November 16 | 1:00 p.m. | No. 5 Nebraska | Cyclone Stadium; Ames, IA (rivalry) | | L 14–49 | 47,850 | |
| November 23 | 1:10 p.m. | at No. 14 Kansas State | KSU Stadium; Manhattan, KS (rivalry) | | L 20–35 | 43,174 | |
*Non-conference game; ^{†}Homecoming; Rankings from AP Poll released prior to the game; All times are in Central time

== Roster ==
1996 Iowa State Cyclones football team roster
Players
Coaches
Offense

| Pos. | # | Name | Class |
|---|---|---|---|
| FB | 29 | Jason Bales | Jr |
| QB | 17 | Todd Bandhauer | So |
| OL | 70 | Ben Beaudet | Fr |
| OL | 78 | Eugene Bernal | Jr |
| OL | 72 | Chad Billings | Jr |
| WR | 83 | Gerrick Bivins | Jr |
| OL | 79 | Charlie Bogwi | So |
| RB | | Troy Davis | Jr |
| QB | 7 | Todd Doxzon | Sr |

Defense

| Pos. | # | Name | Class |
|---|---|---|---|
| LB | 60 | Neville Campbell | Fr |
| DL | 59 | Chad Casavant | Fr |
| ILB | 11 | Derrik Clark | Jr |

Special teams

| Pos. | # | Name | Class |

Head coach

- Dan McCarney

Coordinators/assistant coaches

Legend

- (C) Team captain
- (S) Suspended
- (I) Ineligible
- Injured
- Redshirt

Roster
