= 1996 Baylor Bears football team =

American college football season

1996 Baylor Bears football
- Conference: Big 12 Conference
- South Division
- Record: 4–7 (1–7 Big 12)
- Head coach: Chuck Reedy (4th season)
- Co-offensive coordinators: Mike Gundy (1st season); Ron West (1st season)
- Offensive scheme: I formation
- Defensive coordinator: Andy McCollum (2nd season)
- Base defense: 3–4
- Home stadium: Floyd Casey Stadium

1996 Big 12 Conference football standings
	Conf.			Overall
Team	W		L	W		L
North Division
No. 6 Nebraska x%	8	–	0	11	–	2
No. 8 Colorado	7	–	1	10	–	2
No. 17 Kansas State	6	–	2	9	–	3
Missouri	3	–	5	5	–	6
Kansas	2	–	6	4	–	7
Iowa State	1	–	7	2	–	9
South Division
No. 23 Texas x$	6	–	2	8	–	5
Texas Tech	5	–	3	7	–	5
Texas A&M	4	–	4	6	–	6
Oklahoma	3	–	5	3	–	8
Oklahoma State	2	–	6	5	–	6
Baylor	1	–	7	4	–	7
Championship: Texas 37, Nebraska 27
x – Division champion/co-champions; $ – Bowl Alliance representative as champion % – Bowl Alliance at-large representative; Rankings from AP Poll

The 1996 Baylor Bears football team represented Baylor University as a member of the South Division of the Big 12 Conference during the 1996 NCAA Division I-A football season. Led by Chuck Reedy in his fourth and final season as head coach, the Bears compiled an overall record of 4–7 with a mark of 1–7 in conference play, placing last out of six teams in the Big 12's South Division. The team played home games at Floyd Casey Stadium in Waco, Texas.

Reedy was fired following the conclusion of the season.

== Schedule ==
Date	Time	Opponent	Site	TV	Result	Attendance	Source
September 7	7:00 p.m.	at Louisiana Tech*	Independence Stadium; Shreveport, LA		W 24–16	29,469	
September 14	2:00 p.m.	at Louisville*	Cardinal Stadium; Louisville, KY	FSN	W 14–13	38,756	
September 21	2:30 p.m.	Oregon State*	Floyd Casey Stadium; Waco, TX	ABC	W 42–10	42,327	
October 5	6:30 p.m.	at Texas Tech	Jones Stadium; Lubbock, TX (rivalry)		L 24–45	50,594	
October 12	1:00 p.m.	at No. 5 Nebraska	Memorial Stadium; Lincoln, NE		L 0–49	75,478	
October 19	6:00 p.m.	Oklahoma	Floyd Casey Stadium; Waco, TX		L 24–28	35,712	
October 26	1:00 p.m.	Iowa State^{†}	Floyd Casey Stadium; Waco, TX		W 49–21	35,114	
November 2	2:30 p.m.	at Texas	Darrell K Royal–Texas Memorial Stadium; Austin, TX (rivalry)	ABC	L 23–28	75,482	
November 9	2:30 p.m.	Texas A&M	Floyd Casey Stadium; Waco, TX (Battle of the Brazos)	ABC	L 7–24	45,112	
November 16	1:00 p.m.	Missouri	Floyd Casey Stadium; Waco, TX		L 42–49 ^{3OT}	22,705	
November 23	2:00 p.m.	at Oklahoma State	Lewis Field; Stillwater, OK		L 17–37	21,000	
*Non-conference game; ^{†}Homecoming; Rankings from AP Poll released prior to the game; All times are in Central time

== Roster ==
1996 Baylor Bears football team roster
Players
Coaches
Offense

Pos.	#	Name	Class
OT	79	David Davis	Sr
RB	22	Jerod Douglas	Jr
OT	78	Curtis Draper	Sr

Defense

Pos.	#	Name	Class
CB	5	George McCullough	Sr
FS	14	Rodney Smith	Fr

Special teams

Pos.	#	Name	Class
C, LB	40	Jody Littleton	Jr

Head coach

- Chuck Reedy

Coordinators/assistant coaches

Legend

- (C) Team captain
- (S) Suspended
- (I) Ineligible
- Injured
- Redshirt

Roster
Last update: 1996-12-25
