= 1996 Colorado Buffaloes football team =

American college football season

1996 Colorado Buffaloes football

Holiday Bowl champion

Holiday Bowl, W 33–21 vs. Washington
- Conference: Big 12 Conference
- North Division

Ranking
- Coaches: No. 8
- AP: No. 8
- Record: 10–2 (7–1 Big 12)
- Head coach: Rick Neuheisel (2nd season)
- Offensive coordinator: Karl Dorrell (2nd season)
- Offensive scheme: Multiple
- Defensive coordinator: A. J. Christoff (2nd season)
- Base defense: 4–3
- MVPs: Rae Carruth; Matt Russell
- Captain: Game captains
- Home stadium: Folsom Field

1996 Big 12 Conference football standings
	Conf.			Overall
Team	W		L	W		L
North Division
No. 6 Nebraska x%	8	–	0	11	–	2
No. 8 Colorado	7	–	1	10	–	2
No. 17 Kansas State	6	–	2	9	–	3
Missouri	3	–	5	5	–	6
Kansas	2	–	6	4	–	7
Iowa State	1	–	7	2	–	9
South Division
No. 23 Texas x$	6	–	2	8	–	5
Texas Tech	5	–	3	7	–	5
Texas A&M	4	–	4	6	–	6
Oklahoma	3	–	5	3	–	8
Oklahoma State	2	–	6	5	–	6
Baylor	1	–	7	4	–	7
Championship: Texas 37, Nebraska 27
x – Division champion/co-champions; $ – Bowl Alliance representative as champion % – Bowl Alliance at-large representative; Rankings from AP Poll

The 1996 Colorado Buffaloes football team represented the University of Colorado at Boulder as a member of the North Division of the newly-formed Big 12 Conference during the 1996 NCAA Division I FBS football season. Led by second-year head coach Rick Neuheisel, the Buffaloes compiled an overall record of 10–2 in a mark of 7–1 in conference play, placing second in the Big 12 North. Colorado was invited to the Holiday Bowl, where the Buffalos defeated Washington. The team played home games at Folsom Field in Boulder, Colorado.

With the bowl victory, Colorado recorded its third straight 10-win season for the first time in program history.

== Schedule ==
Date	Time	Opponent	Rank	Site	TV	Result	Attendance
August 31	1:30 pm	Washington State*	No. 5	Folsom Field; Boulder, CO	ABC	W 37–19	51,481
September 7	7:00 pm	at Colorado State*	No. 5	Hughes Stadium; Fort Collins, CO (Rocky Mountain Showdown)	ESPN2	W 48–34	36,371
September 14	1:30 pm	No. 11 Michigan*	No. 5	Folsom Field; Boulder, CO (College GameDay)	ABC	L 13–20	53,788
September 28	1:30 pm	at Texas A&M	No. 12	Kyle Field; College Station, TX	ABC	W 24–10	74,339
October 12	8:00 pm	Oklahoma State	No. 10	Folsom Field; Boulder, CO	Prime	W 35–13	53,005
October 19	10:30 am	at Kansas	No. 9	Memorial Stadium; Lawrence, KS	Prime	W 20–7	48,500
October 26	1:30 pm	Texas	No. 8	Folsom Field; Boulder, CO	ABC	W 28–24	51,100
November 2	12:00 pm	at Missouri	No. 7	Faurot Field; Columbia, MO	PPV	W 41–13	34,440
November 9	12:30 pm	Iowa State^{†}	No. 7	Folsom Field; Boulder, CO		W 49–42	49,662
November 16	5:00 pm	No. 9 Kansas State	No. 6	Folsom Field; Boulder, CO (rivalry)	FSN	W 12–0	53,550
November 29	12:30 pm	at No. 4 Nebraska	No. 5	Memorial Stadium; Lincoln, NE (rivalry)	ABC	L 12–17	75,695
December 30	6:00 pm	vs. No. 13 Washington*	No. 8	Jack Murphy Stadium; San Diego, CA (Holiday Bowl)	ESPN	W 33–21	54,749
*Non-conference game; ^{†}Homecoming; Rankings from AP Poll released prior to the game; All times are in Mountain time

== Roster ==
1996 Colorado Buffaloes football team roster
Players
Coaches
Offense

Pos.	#	Name	Class
QB	14	Koy Detmer	Sr
WR	21	Rae Carruth	Sr
G	62	Chris Morgan	Fr

Defense

Pos.	#	Name	Class
SS	6	Ryan Black	Jr
LB	16	Matt Russell	Jr

Special teams

Pos.	#	Name	Class

Head coach

- Rick Neuheisel

Coordinators/assistant coaches

Legend

- (C) Team captain
- (S) Suspended
- (I) Ineligible
- Injured
- Redshirt

Roster
