= Ronnie Ward =

American football player (born 1974)

No. 55, 57
- Position: Linebacker

Personal information
- Born: February 11, 1974 (age 52); St. Louis, Missouri, U.S.
- Listed height: 6 ft 0 in (1.83 m)
- Listed weight: 232 lb (105 kg)

Career information
- High school: St. Louis (MO) Hazelwood East
- College: Kansas
- NFL draft: 1997: 3rd round, 93rd overall pick

Career history
- Miami Dolphins (1997); Denver Broncos (1999)*
- * Offseason or practice squad member only
- Stats at Pro Football Reference

Ronnie Ward (born February 11, 1974) is an American former professional football linebacker. He played for the Miami Dolphins in 1997. He was selected in the third round of the 1997 NFL draft with the 93rd overall pick.
