= 1996 Big Ten Conference football season =

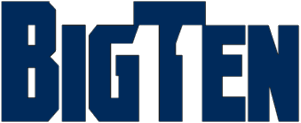
- League: NCAA Division I-A
- Sport: football
- Teams: 11
- Co-champions: Ohio State, Northwestern

Football seasons

1996 Big Ten Conference football standings
| | Conf. | | | Overall |
| Team | W | | L | W | | L |
|---|---|---|---|---|---|---|
| No. 2 Ohio State + | 7 | – | 1 | 11 | – | 1 |
| No. 15 Northwestern + | 7 | – | 1 | 9 | – | 3 |
| No. 7 Penn State | 6 | – | 2 | 11 | – | 2 |
| No. 18 Iowa | 6 | – | 2 | 9 | – | 3 |
| No. 20 Michigan | 5 | – | 3 | 8 | – | 4 |
| Michigan State | 5 | – | 3 | 6 | – | 6 |
| Wisconsin | 3 | – | 5 | 8 | – | 5 |
| Purdue | 2 | – | 6 | 3 | – | 8 |
| Minnesota | 1 | – | 7 | 4 | – | 7 |
| Indiana | 1 | – | 7 | 3 | – | 8 |
| Illinois | 1 | – | 7 | 2 | – | 9 |
+ – Conference co-champions; Rankings from AP Poll

The 1996 Big Ten Conference football season was the 101st season of college football played by the member schools of the Big Ten Conference and was a part of the 1996 NCAA Division I-A football season.

== Regular season ==
With 7-1 conference marks, Ohio State and Northwestern shared the Big Ten title in 1996. Since Northwestern had just represented the league in the Rose Bowl the year before, Ohio State was granted the opportunity to face Arizona State in the 1997 Rose Bowl, their first since the 1984 team. Ohio State would finish the season ranked No. 2 in the AP Poll and Northwestern at No. 15.

No. 7 Penn State and No. 18 Iowa tied for third with 6-2 conference records. No. 20 Michigan and Michigan State tied for fifth place at 5-3.

Wisconsin came in seventh at 3-5 (8-5 overall), followed by eighth-place Purdue at 2-6 (3-8 overall).

Minnesota, Indiana, and Illinois all went 1-7 in conference play, going 4-7, 3-8, and 2-9 overall, respectively.

== Bowl games ==
Seven Big Ten teams played in bowl games, going 4-3 overall. The conference did not participate in the Bowl Alliance:

| Rose Bowl: | No. 4 Ohio State | 20 | No. 2 Arizona St. | 17 | 1/1/97 |
| Fiesta Bowl: | No. 7 Penn State | 38 | No. 20 Texas | 15 | 1/1/97 |
| Florida Citrus Bowl: | No. 9 Tennessee | 48 | No. 11 Northwestern | 28 | 1/1/97 |
| Outback Bowl: | No. 16 Alabama | 17 | No. 15 Michigan | 14 | 1/1/97 |
| Sun Bowl: | Stanford | 38 | Michigan State | 0 | 12/31/96 |
| Alamo Bowl: | No. 21 Iowa | 27 | Texas Tech | 0 | 12/29/96 |
| Copper Bowl: | Wisconsin | 38 | Utah | 10 | 12/27/96 |

- *Note: shown rankings were prior to the bowl game matchups.
