= 1996 Alabama Crimson Tide football team =

American college football season

1996 Alabama Crimson Tide football

SEC Western Division co-champion Outback Bowl champion

SEC Championship Game, L 30–45 vs. Florida

Outback Bowl, W 17–14 vs. Michigan
- Conference: Southeastern Conference
- Western Division

Ranking
- Coaches: No. 11
- AP: No. 11
- Record: 10–3 (6–2 SEC)
- Head coach: Gene Stallings (7th season)
- Offensive coordinator: Woody McCorvey (1st season)
- Defensive coordinator: Mike DuBose (1st season)
- Home stadium: Bryant–Denny Stadium; Legion Field

1996 Southeastern Conference football standings
	Conf.			Overall
Team	W		L	W		L
Eastern Division
No. 1 Florida x$	8	–	0	12	–	1
No. 9 Tennessee	7	–	1	10	–	2
South Carolina	4	–	4	6	–	5
Kentucky	3	–	5	4	–	7
Georgia	3	–	5	5	–	6
Vanderbilt	0	–	8	2	–	9
Western Division
No. 11 Alabama xy	6	–	2	10	–	3
No. 12 LSU x	6	–	2	10	–	2
No. 24 Auburn	4	–	4	8	–	4
Mississippi State	3	–	5	5	–	6
Ole Miss	2	–	6	5	–	6
Arkansas	2	–	6	4	–	7
Championship: Florida 45, Alabama 30
$ – Conference champion; x – Division champion/co-champions; y – Championship game participant; Rankings from AP Poll

The 1996 Alabama Crimson Tide football team represented the University of Alabama as a member of the Western Division of the Southeastern Conference (SEC) during the 1996 NCAA Division I-A football season. Led by Gene Stallings in his seventh and final season as head coach, the Crimson Tide compiled an overall record of 10–3 with a mark of 6–2 in conference play, SEC's Western Division title with LSU. By virtue of a head-to-head win over Tigers, Alabama advanced to the SEC Championship Game, where the Crimson Tide lost to the eventual national champion Florida. Alabama was then invited to the Outback Bowl, defeating Michigan in the game. The team played home games at Bryant–Denny Stadium in Tuscaloosa, Alabama, and Legion Field in Birmingham, Alabama.

Alabama's loss to Mississippi State on November 16 broke a 15-game winning streak Alabama had in the series, and was the Crimson Tide's first loss to the Bulldogs since a dramatic upset that Bulldogs posted over the top-ranked Tide in 1980. Following a victory in the annual Iron Bowl on November 23, Stallings announced his retirement, effective at the end of the season.

== Schedule ==
Date	Time	Opponent	Rank	Site	TV	Result	Attendance	Source
August 31	2:00 p.m.	Bowling Green*	No. 13	Legion Field; Birmingham, AL	PPV	W 21–7	76,878	
September 7	11:30 a.m.	Southern Miss*	No. 14	Legion Field; Birmingham, AL	JPS	W 20–10	82,338	
September 14	5:00 p.m.	Vanderbilt	No. 13	Bryant–Denny Stadium; Tuscaloosa, AL	ESPN2	W 36–26	70,123	
September 21	11:30 a.m.	at Arkansas	No. 13	War Memorial Stadium; Little Rock, AR	JPS	W 17–7	54,827	
October 5	1:00 p.m.	Kentucky^{†}	No. 13	Bryant–Denny Stadium; Tuscaloosa, AL	PPV	W 35–7	70,123	
October 12	2:30 p.m.	at NC State*	No. 8	Carter–Finley Stadium; Raleigh, NC	ABC	W 24–19	50,750	
October 19	5:00 p.m.	Ole Miss	No. 7	Bryant–Denny Stadium; Tuscaloosa, AL (rivalry)	ESPN2	W 37–0	70,123	
October 26	2:30 p.m.	at No. 6 Tennessee	No. 7	Neyland Stadium; Knoxville, TN (Third Saturday in October)	CBS	L 13–20	106,700	
November 9	6:30 p.m.	at No. 11 LSU	No. 10	Tiger Stadium; Baton Rouge, LA (rivalry, College GameDay)	ESPN	W 26–0	80,290	
November 16	8:00 p.m.	at Mississippi State	No. 8	Scott Field; Starkville, MS (rivalry)	ESPN	L 16–17	40,050	
November 23	6:30 p.m.	Auburn	No. 15	Legion Field; Birmingham, AL (Iron Bowl, College GameDay)	ESPN	W 24–23	83,091	
December 7	8:00 p.m.	vs. No. 4 Florida	No. 11	Georgia Dome; Atlanta, GA (SEC Championship Game, rivalry)	ABC	L 30–45	74,132	
January 1, 1997	10:00 a.m.	vs. No. 15 Michigan*	No. 16	Houlihan's Stadium; Tampa, FL (Outback Bowl)	ESPN	W 17–14	53,161	
*Non-conference game; ^{†}Homecoming; Rankings from AP Poll released prior to the game; All times are in Central time

== Rankings ==
Ranking movements Legend: ██ Increase in ranking ██ Decrease in ranking т = Tied with team above or below
	Week																	
Poll	Pre	1	2	3	4	5	6	7	8	9	10	11	12	13	14	15	16	Final
AP	15	13	14	13	13т	14	13	8	7	7	10	10	8	15	15	11	16	11
Coaches	14		13	12	11	10	10	8	7	6	11	10	8	12	12	11	15	11

== Game summaries ==
=== Bowling Green ===
	1	2	3	4	Total
Falcons	0	0	0	7	7
No. 13 Crimson Tide	7	7	7	0	21

Alabama kicked off the season with a 21–7 victory over newly reclassified Division I opponent Bowling Green, extending the Tide’s streak to six consecutive season-opening wins.

Alabama used two quarterbacks in the first half as the coaching staff continued to evaluate the competition for the starting job, with Freddie Kitchens and Warren Foust sharing the workload. Both quarterbacks led scoring drives. Kitchens opened the game under center and engineered a 49-yard drive in the first quarter, capped by a one-yard touchdown run from Dennis Riddle to put Alabama on the board. Foust took over later in the half and led a 67-yard scoring drive late in the second quarter, finding Marcel West for a touchdown to give the Tide a 14–0 lead at halftime.

Kitchens returned to lead the offense to begin the second half and engineered a 97-yard scoring drive on Alabama’s opening possession of the third quarter. The drive was capped by a one-yard touchdown run from Curtis Alexander, extending the Tide’s lead to 21–0.

Bowling Green finally got on the scoreboard after a fumble by Hayden Stockton on a fake punt gave the Falcons a short field. The Falcons would have three more opportunities to score from Alabama territory, including possessions following an onside kick recovery and an interception of a Kitchens pass, but the Tide defense stood firm each time, keeping Bowling Green off the scoreboard on all three occasions.

Statistics	Bowling Green	Alabama
First downs	7	16
Total yards	177	316
Rushing yards	80	154
Passing yards	97	162
Turnovers	3	3
Time of possession	27:42	32:18

Team	Category	Player	Statistics
Bowling Green	Passing	Bob Niemet	9–19, 59 yards, 1 INT
Bowling Green	Rushing	Courtney Davis	13 carries, 54 yards, 1 TD
Bowling Green	Receiving	Jacque Rogers	4 receptions, 44 yards
Alabama	Passing	Freddie Kitchens	10–16, 156 yards, 1 INT
Alabama	Rushing	Curtis Alexander	6 carries, 63 yards, 1 TD
Alabama	Receiving	Michael Vaughn	5 receptions, 73 yards

=== Southern Miss ===
	1	2	3	4	Total
Golden Eagles	0	10	0	0	10
No. 14 Crimson Tide	10	7	3	0	20

Alabama’s defense dominated once again, holding Southern Miss to just 109 yards of offense as the Crimson Tide secured their sixth consecutive victory over the Golden Eagles.

Alabama took advantage of a fumbled exchange by Southern Miss punter Jamie Purder on the Golden Eagles’ first possession and turned the mistake into a 23-yard field goal by Brian Cunningham, the first of his career, to take an early 3–0 lead. After the defense forced another punt, Freddie Kitchens engineered a 61-yard scoring drive in seven plays, capping it with his first touchdown pass of the season to Patrick Hape to give the Tide a 10–0 advantage.

After turning the ball over three times in the first quarter, Southern Miss finally capitalized on a big play when Eric Booth broke loose for a 40-yard run on third-and-27, setting up a 37-yard field goal by Johnny Lomoro early in the second quarter to put the Golden Eagles on the board. Alabama answered immediately with a 75-yard scoring drive that covered nine plays and ended with Kitchens’ second touchdown pass of the afternoon, this time to Marcel West, extending the Tide’s lead to 17–3.

Southern Miss responded with an 85-yard scoring drive of its own, capped by Harold Shaw’s one-yard touchdown run, cutting Alabama’s lead to 17–10 heading into halftime.

Alabama received the ball to start the second half and drove 51 yards in 10 plays before settling for a 46-yard field goal by Cunningham, extending the Tide’s advantage to 20–10.

That would be all the offense Alabama needed, as the defense completely shut down the Golden Eagles in the second half. Southern Miss failed to complete a single pass after halftime and managed just negative-29 yards of total offense, allowing Alabama to cruise to victory.

Statistics	Southern Miss	Alabama
First downs	8	20
Total yards	109	304
Rushing yards	11	115
Passing yards	98	189
Turnovers	3	1
Time of possession	19:37	40:21

Team	Category	Player	Statistics
Southern Miss	Passing	Heath Graham	8–26, 98 yards, 2 INT's
Southern Miss	Rushing	Eric Booth	5 carries, 46 yards
Southern Miss	Receiving	Sherrod Gideon	2 receptions, 59 yards
Alabama	Passing	Freddie Kitchens	15–23, 180 yards, 2 TD's
Alabama	Rushing	Curtis Alexander	20 carries, 73 yards
Alabama	Receiving	Michael Vaughn	5 receptions, 70 yards

=== Vanderbilt ===
	1	2	3	4	Total
Commodores	7	8	11	0	26
No. 13 Crimson Tide	3	12	21	0	36

In the first home game of the 1996 season at Bryant-Denny Stadium, Alabama overcame an early deficit with a relentless 21-point surge in the third quarter, overpowering Vanderbilt and thrilling the home crowd on its way to a 36–26 victory.

Vanderbilt jumped on top early, marching 68 yards on its opening possession before Jason Dunnavant capped the drive with a seven-yard touchdown run to give the Commodores a 7–0 lead. Alabama responded on each of its first three possessions, driving deep into Vanderbilt territory each time but settling for field goals from Brian Cunningham of 28, 26, and 23 yards to take a 9–7 lead in the second quarter.

Vanderbilt answered with a stunning special-teams play on its next possession. Punter Bill Marinangel took the snap and raced straight up the middle untouched for an 81-yard touchdown, the longest touchdown run in Vanderbilt history at the time. The Commodores then converted a two-point pass to take a 15–9 lead.

Late in the first half, Alabama recovered a Damian Allen fumble, setting up its first touchdown of the night. Freddie Kitchens found Marcel West for a seven-yard touchdown strike, but a blocked extra point kept the game tied at 15 heading into halftime.

After Vanderbilt attempted a surprise onside kick to begin the second half, Alabama recovered the ball. However, the Commodores would quickly regain possession when DeReal Finklin intercepted Freddie Kitchens, setting up a drive into Alabama territory that ended with a 38-yard field goal by Brett Speakman to give Vanderbilt an 18–15 lead.

The Tide answered immediately. Kitchens led a scoring drive that he finished himself, breaking loose for a 15-yard touchdown run to put Alabama back in front, 22–18.

From there, Alabama took control. On Vanderbilt’s next possession, Kevin Jackson intercepted an Allen pass and returned it 44 yards for a touchdown, extending the Tide’s lead to 29–18. Vanderbilt then fumbled on the very next offensive play, and Alabama recovered, setting up a one-yard touchdown run by Curtis Alexander to push the lead to 36–18.

Vanderbilt added another special-teams touchdown late in the third quarter when Alvin Duke returned a punt 88 yards for a score. The Commodores converted another two-point attempt to cut Alabama’s lead to 10, but that would be as close as they would get. Alabama’s defense held firm the rest of the way, allowing the Tide to secure a hard-fought 36–26 victory.

Statistics	Vanderbilt	Alabama
First downs	11	23
Total yards	255	367
Rushing yards	116	160
Passing yards	139	207
Turnovers	5	3
Time of possession	23:47	36:13

Team	Category	Player	Statistics
Vanderbilt	Passing	Damian Allen	11–21, 139 yards, 3 INT's
Vanderbilt	Rushing	Bill Marinangel	1 carry, 81 yards, 1 TD
Vanderbilt	Receiving	Billy Miller	1 reception, 38 yards
Alabama	Passing	Freddie Kitchens	16–27, 209 yards, 1 TD, 3 INT's
Alabama	Rushing	Curtis Alexander	19 carries, 83 yards, 1 TD
Alabama	Receiving	Marcell West	3 receptions, 43 yards, 1 TD

=== Arkansas ===
	1	2	3	4	Total
No. 13 Crimson Tide	0	7	0	10	17
Razorbacks	0	0	0	7	7

A defensive struggle went the Crimson Tide’s way as Alabama avenged its loss to Arkansas from a year earlier with a hard-fought 17–7 victory.

After trading punts for most of the first half, Alabama finally put together a scoring drive in the waning minutes of the second quarter. Dennis Riddle capped the drive with a one-yard touchdown run to give the Tide a 7–0 lead heading into halftime.

The teams continued to trade punts for much of the third quarter, and Alabama appeared to be on the verge of punting again when it faced a third-and-21. Freddie Kitchens, however, found Michael Vaughn for a 29-yard completion to move the chains and take the Tide into Arkansas territory. The drive eventually ended with a 31-yard field goal by Brian Cunningham, extending Alabama’s lead to 10–0 early in the fourth quarter.

Alabama appeared poised to put the game away on Arkansas’ next possession when Cedric Samuel intercepted Pete Burks, giving the Tide the ball deep in Razorback territory. Two plays later, however, Riddle had the ball stripped by C.J. McLain, giving Arkansas possession back. The Razorbacks then fumbled an option pitch, which was recovered by Alabama’s Chris Hood and once again gave the Tide an opportunity to add to its lead. This time, Cunningham missed his first field-goal attempt of the season, a 45-yarder, keeping the score at 10–0.

Arkansas then appeared to be on its way to cutting into the deficit when Chrys Chukwuma broke through the middle on a perfectly timed draw play. Kevin Sigler chased him down from behind and punched the ball loose into the end zone, where Fernando Bryant recovered and returned it to the 15-yard line, ending the Razorbacks’ scoring threat.

After forcing an Alabama punt, Arkansas finally broke through. The Razorbacks benefited from two 15-yard penalties—one for pass interference and another against Gene Stallings for his reaction to the pass-interference call—which helped Arkansas drive deep into Alabama territory. Burks eventually connected with Anthony Eubanks for a touchdown, cutting the Tide’s lead to 10–7.

Alabama answered immediately with an 80-yard scoring drive, with Kitchens finding Vaughn for the second time that afternoon for a touchdown putting the Tide back in front by 10 and ultimately sealing the victory.

Statistics	Alabama	Arkansas
First downs	14	13
Total yards	288	206
Rushing yards	105	130
Passing yards	183	76
Turnovers	1	3
Time of possession	33:08	26:52

Team	Category	Player	Statistics
Alabama	Passing	Freddie Kitchens	14–28, 183 yards, 1 TD
Alabama	Rushing	Dennis Riddle	20 carries, 77 yards, 1 TD
Alabama	Receiving	Calvin Hall	3 receptions, 78 yards
Arkansas	Passing	Pete Burks	11–24, 76 yards, 1 TD, 1 INT
Arkansas	Rushing	Oscar Malone; Chrys Chukwuma	14 carries, 72 yards 9 carries, 72 yards
Arkansas	Receiving	Anthony Eubanks	3 receptions, 37 yards, 1 TD

=== Kentucky ===
	1	2	3	4	Total
Wildcats	0	7	0	0	7
No. 13 Crimson Tide	7	0	28	0	35

Former Alabama coach Bill Curry returned to Tuscaloosa for the first time since leaving Alabama for Kentucky following the 1989 season, but his return would end in a 35–7 loss to the Crimson Tide.

The Alabama defense got things going early when Ralph Staten stripped Kentucky running back Anthony White, giving Alabama the ball inside the Kentucky 20-yard line. A few plays later, Shaun Alexander scored his first collegiate touchdown against his home-state school to give Alabama an early 7–0 lead.

Alabama would force a Kentucky punt to get the ball back, but Freddie Kitchens fumbled, giving the Wildcats excellent field position in Alabama territory. The defense would once again rise to the occasion, stopping Kentucky on fourth down to regain possession. Alabama gave Kentucky another opportunity when Derone Fagan muffed a punt, but the Wildcats were unable to take advantage.

Early in the second quarter, Dennis Riddle fumbled a handoff, once again giving Kentucky great field position. Once again, however, Alabama's defense stood strong and forced a punt. After Alabama punted, Kentucky finally put together a sustained drive that culminated in a 41-yard touchdown run by Billy Jack Haskins. It was Kentucky's first touchdown since its season opener and tied the game at 7–7. That would remain the score at halftime, drawing a chorus of boos from the Homecoming crowd.

Alabama was forced to punt on its opening possessions of the second half, but the Tide defense continued to make plays. After one punt was downed at the Kentucky 1-yard line, Haskins threw an interception to Kevin Jackson, giving Alabama a first-and-goal opportunity. The Tide took advantage, with Riddle scoring on a 2-yard touchdown run to put Alabama back in front.

On the ensuing kickoff, Kentucky fumbled the ball back to Alabama, and the Crimson Tide made the Wildcats pay six plays later when Riddle scored again on a 1-yard touchdown run to extend the lead to 21–7. After another Kentucky punt and a strong return by Deshea Townsend, Kitchens found a wide-open Riddle for a 35-yard touchdown pass, pushing the lead to 28–7.

On Alabama's next possession, the Tide appeared to be forced to punt on fourth-and-2, but a Kentucky penalty kept the drive alive. Alabama took advantage when Kitchens found Calvin Hall deep for a 43-yard reception, setting up another first-and-goal opportunity. Riddle once again cashed in, this time from 6 yards out, to push the lead to 35–7.

Kentucky could do nothing offensively in the second half, failing to record a first down or a completion and managing just 31 yards of total offense. After a frustrating first half, Alabama's defense completely took over after halftime, while the offense turned Kentucky's mistakes into points to deliver a dominant 35–7 Homecoming victory.

Statistics	Kentucky	Alabama
First downs	4	17
Total yards	124	358
Rushing yards	75	168
Passing yards	49	190
Turnovers	3	5
Time of possession	27:10	32:50

Team	Category	Player	Statistics
Kentucky	Passing	Billy Jack Haskins	5–14, 49 yards, 1 INT
Kentucky	Rushing	Billy Jack Haskins	15 carries, 54 yards, 1 TD
Kentucky	Receiving	Craig Yeast	1 reception, 22 yards
Alabama	Passing	Freddie Kitchens	9–16, 152 yards, 1 TD
Alabama	Rushing	Shaun Alexander	9 carries, 54 yards, 1 TD
Alabama	Receiving	Calvin Hall	2 receptions, 52 yards

=== NC State ===
	1	2	3	4	Total
No. 8 Crimson Tide	7	0	7	10	24
Wolfpack	3	0	3	13	19

Despite giving up a season-high 418 yards of offense, the Crimson Tide survived a late scare on the road to remain undefeated, holding on for a 24–19 victory over NC State.

After exchanging punts on their opening possessions, NC State found success on its second drive as Marc Primanti connected on a 48-yard field goal to give the Wolfpack an early 3–0 lead. Alabama responded late in the first quarter with a nine-play, 71-yard scoring drive capped by a three-yard touchdown run from Dennis Riddle to give the Tide a 7–3 advantage.

Both teams had opportunities to add to the score in the second quarter. NC State was stopped on fourth-and-two from the Alabama 34-yard line, while Alabama recovered a fumbled option pitch at the NC State 20. However, Brian Cunningham’s 35-yard field-goal attempt was blocked, keeping the score 7–3 at halftime.

Alabama opened the second half with another impressive scoring drive, marching 79 yards in nine plays before Riddle found the end zone again, this time on a 14-yard touchdown run, to extend the Tide’s lead to 14–3. NC State answered with a drive of its own, reaching the Alabama 3-yard line before a huge sack stalled the possession and forced the Wolfpack to settle for another Primanti field goal, this one from 36 yards, cutting the deficit to 14–6.

Alabama responded with a long drive that carried into the early stages of the fourth quarter and ended with a 22-yard field goal by Jon Brock, restoring the Tide’s 11-point advantage.

The Wolfpack refused to go away, putting together an 80-yard scoring drive capped by a 25-yard touchdown run from Rod Brown. NC State attempted a two-point conversion but failed, cutting Alabama’s lead to 17–12.

Alabama answered with an 80-yard touchdown drive of its own, covering 13 plays and featuring three third-down conversions. Once again, Riddle finished the drive, scoring his third touchdown of the afternoon on a four-yard run to extend the Tide’s lead to 24–12 with less than five minutes remaining.

NC State still had one more answer. Jamie Barnette connected with Chris Coleman on a 72-yard touchdown pass, cutting the Alabama lead back to five. After a failed onside kick, the NC State defense forced an Alabama punt, giving the Wolfpack one final opportunity to complete the comeback.

NC State moved the ball to near midfield, but Barnette’s final pass was intercepted by Fernando Bryant, sealing a hard-fought 24–19 road victory for Alabama.

Statistics	Alabama	NC State
First downs	20	22
Total yards	353	418
Rushing yards	172	158
Passing yards	181	260
Turnovers	0	2
Time of possession	30:40	29:20

Team	Category	Player	Statistics
Alabama	Passing	Freddie Kitchens	13–24, 181 yards
Alabama	Rushing	Dennis Riddle	33 carries, 154 yards, 3 TD's
Alabama	Receiving	Michael Vaughn	6 receptions, 102 yards
NC State	Passing	Jamie Barnette	14–25, 260 yards, 1 TD, 1 INT
NC State	Rushing	Tremayne Stephens	22 carries, 105 yards
NC State	Receiving	Chris Coleman	1 reception, 72 yards, 1 TD

=== Ole Miss ===
	1	2	3	4	Total
Rebels	0	0	0	0	0
No. 7 Crimson Tide	3	7	14	13	37

The Crimson Tide put together its most complete performance of the 1996 season to date, rolling to a dominant 37–0 shutout victory over Ole Miss.

Alabama went three-and-out on its opening possession, but an Ole Miss personal foul on fourth down gave the Tide new life. Alabama took advantage, driving into Rebels territory before Jon Brock connected on a 30-yard field goal to give the Tide an early 3–0 lead.

After forcing an Ole Miss punt, Alabama again drove deep into Rebels territory, thanks in large part to a 29-yard run on a reverse by Shamari Buchanan. However, Freddie Kitchens had a pass intercepted in the end zone by Ronnie Heard, ending the scoring threat. Alabama would once again move into Ole Miss territory on its third possession following another Rebels punt, but the drive stalled on a failed fourth-down attempt, keeping the score at 3–0.

The Tide finally broke through on its next possession, marching 80 yards before Kitchens found Michael Vaughn for a 10-yard touchdown pass to extend the lead to 10–0. That score would stand as the only touchdown of the first half, sending Alabama into the locker room with the same 10-point advantage.

Kitchens threw his second interception of the night on Alabama’s opening possession of the second half, with Tim Strickland returning the pick 21 yards into Alabama territory. Ole Miss attempted to capitalize with a 57-yard field-goal attempt, but the kick fell well short. On the very next play, Kitchens found Vaughn again, this time for a 60-yard touchdown strike, extending Alabama’s lead to 17–0.

Later in the third quarter, Alabama put together a 69-yard scoring drive in eight plays, capped by a two-yard touchdown run from Dennis Riddle to push the lead to 24–0. The Tide found the end zone again on its next possession when Montoya Madden scampered five yards for a touchdown, giving Alabama a commanding 31–0 advantage.

Madden struck again on Alabama’s next possession, scoring from five yards out for his second touchdown of the night and putting the finishing touches on a dominant 37–0 victory.

The shutout was Alabama’s first of the 1996 season and capped the Tide’s most complete performance of the year to that point.

Statistics	Ole Miss	Alabama
First downs	9	28
Total yards	158	489
Rushing yards	26	273
Passing yards	132	216
Turnovers	0	3
Time of possession	25:53	34:07

Team	Category	Player	Statistics
Ole Miss	Passing	Stewart Patridge	10–22, 132 yards
Ole Miss	Rushing	Tony Cannion	9 carries, 37 yards
Ole Miss	Receiving	Ta'Boris Fisher	4 receptions, 49 yards
Alabama	Passing	Freddie Kitchens	13–33, 216 yards, 2 TD's, 2 INT's
Alabama	Rushing	Dennis Riddle	31 carries, 140 yards, 1 TD
Alabama	Receiving	Michael Vaughn	3 receptions, 89 yards, 2 TD's

=== Tennessee ===
	1	2	3	4	Total
No. 7 Crimson Tide	0	3	10	0	13
No. 6 Volunteers	0	0	6	14	20

Tennessee used 14 unanswered points in the fourth quarter to defeat Alabama for the second consecutive year and beat the Crimson Tide in Knoxville for the first time since 1984.

A crowd of 106,700 packed Neyland Stadium, the largest crowd to watch an Alabama game at the time, for this highly anticipated top-10 matchup. Both teams went three-and-out on their first two possessions before Tennessee finally picked up the game’s first first down on its third drive and moved into Alabama territory. However, an offensive pass interference penalty halted the drive and forced another punt, which pinned Alabama at its own 1-yard line.

Freddie Kitchens attempted to throw on third-and-nine, but his pass was intercepted by Ray Austin, giving Tennessee possession at the Alabama 32-yard line. The Volunteers were unable to capitalize, failing to pick up a first down, and Jeff Hall missed a 40-yard field-goal attempt wide right to keep the game scoreless.

Alabama picked up its first first down of the game on its next possession, but Kitchens threw his second interception of the afternoon, this time to Terry Fair. In the second quarter, Alabama moved into Tennessee territory thanks to a pair of long runs by Dennis Riddle. The drive stalled, however, as the Tide was stopped on fourth down, ending another scoring opportunity.

Tennessee attempted to build on the momentum by driving into Alabama territory on its next possession and setting up for a 48-yard field-goal attempt. A false-start penalty pushed the Volunteers back, and they elected to punt instead. On Tennessee’s following possession, Peyton Manning was sacked from behind and fumbled, with Alabama’s Chris Hood recovering to give the Tide first-and-goal at the Tennessee 4-yard line.

Alabama again failed to find the end zone, and Brian Cunningham’s field-goal attempt was blocked, keeping the game scoreless. After forcing another Tennessee punt, Alabama mounted a late drive into Volunteers territory before finally breaking through. Cunningham connected on a 36-yard field goal, giving the Tide a 3–0 lead heading into halftime.

Alabama opened the second half with its best drive of the game, marching 65 yards before Kitchens connected with Marcel West for a 40-yard touchdown pass to extend the Tide’s lead to 10–0. The Alabama defense seized on the momentum on Tennessee’s next possession when Deshea Townsend intercepted a pass from Manning that had been tipped, giving the Tide the ball at the Tennessee 14-yard line. Alabama could not find the end zone, but Cunningham converted a 25-yard field goal to push the lead to 13–0.

After the teams exchanged punts, Tennessee finally found some offense. On the second play of the drive, Manning audibled to a quick slant to Joey Kent, who broke free for a 54-yard touchdown. Hall missed the extra point, leaving Tennessee trailing 13–6.

After forcing another Alabama three-and-out, Tennessee got the ball back at the Alabama 21-yard line following a short punt and a personal-foul penalty against the Tide. The Alabama defense once again rose to the occasion, recovering a fumbled snap by Manning and preserving the 13–6 lead heading into the fourth quarter.

Alabama drove into Tennessee territory early in the fourth quarter, looking to extend its lead to two possessions. However, Kitchens threw his third interception of the afternoon, his second to Fair. Fair returned the interception all the way for what appeared to be a game-tying touchdown, but the score was wiped out by a clipping penalty during the return, giving Tennessee possession at the Alabama 43-yard line.

The Volunteers took advantage of the second chance, driving 43 yards in four plays before Jay Graham scored on a touchdown run. With Hall converting the extra point this time, Tennessee tied the game at 13.

After another exchange of punts, Alabama got the ball back with just over five minutes remaining and an opportunity to drive for the winning score. The Tide could not capitalize, however, and punted the ball back to Tennessee with just over three minutes remaining.

Starting from its own 22-yard line, Tennessee faced a second-and-12 when Graham broke through the Alabama defense and raced 80 yards for the go-ahead touchdown. Suddenly, the Volunteers had a 20–13 lead.

Alabama got the ball back with two minutes remaining and quickly moved into Tennessee territory, thanks in large part to a 58-yard reception by Michael Vaughn. The Tide appeared to have a chance to tie the game, but Kitchens missed a wide-open Patrick Hape in the end zone on third down. On fourth down, Kitchens was pressured and had the ball stripped by Leonard Little, sealing the victory for Tennessee.

Statistics	Alabama	Tennessee
First downs	15	10
Total yards	326	296
Rushing yards	189	120
Passing yards	137	176
Turnovers	4	3
Time of possession	36:28	23:22

Team	Category	Player	Statistics
Alabama	Passing	Freddie Kitchens	8–21, 137 yards, 1 TD, 3 INT's
Alabama	Rushing	Dennis Riddle	38 carries, 184 yards
Alabama	Receiving	Michael Vaughn	2 receptions, 65 yards
Tennessee	Passing	Peyton Manning	12–25, 176 yards, 1 TD, 1 INT
Tennessee	Rushing	Jay Graham	14 carries, 128 yards, 2 TD's
Tennessee	Receiving	Joey Kent	6 receptions, 125 yards, 1 TD

=== LSU ===
	1	2	3	4	Total
No. 10 Crimson Tide	0	7	12	7	26
No. 11 Tigers	0	0	0	0	0

For the second time in three games, Alabama’s defense shut out its opponent as the Crimson Tide rolled to a dominant 26–0 victory over LSU.

LSU received the opening kickoff and quickly moved the ball with two big pass plays that took the Tigers inside the Alabama 5-yard line with an opportunity to strike first. On first-and-goal, LSU quarterback Herb Tyler found David LaFleur wide open in the end zone for what appeared to be a touchdown. However, LSU was flagged for illegal participation, wiping the score off the board and moving the ball back to the Alabama 20-yard line. The Tigers were forced to settle for a 41-yard field-goal attempt by Wade Richey, which sailed wide right to keep the game scoreless.

Alabama took over and drove into LSU territory, thanks in large part to a couple of long runs by Dennis Riddle, but the drive stalled and the Tide was forced to punt. On LSU’s second possession, Tyler landed awkwardly on his arm and was forced to leave the game for good, bringing backup quarterback Bryan Sparacino into the game. Two plays later, Sparacino ran into his fullback and fumbled, giving the ball back to Alabama. The Crimson Tide was unable to take advantage of the turnover, however, and was forced to punt again.

After another Alabama punt, LSU gained good field position thanks to a strong return by Kevin Faulk and a 25-yard completion from Sparacino to Chris Beard that moved the Tigers into Alabama territory. Three plays later, Richey attempted a 45-yard field goal, but the kick sailed wide left, keeping the game scoreless.

In the second quarter, after another exchange of punts, Alabama finally put together a scoring drive, marching 51 yards in four plays. Shaun Alexander capped the drive with a 17-yard touchdown run on his first carry of the night, giving Alabama a 7–0 lead. Neither team threatened to score again before halftime, and the Tide carried the 7–0 advantage into the locker room.

After an exchange of punts to begin the second half, Alabama took over near midfield on its second possession of the half. Riddle fumbled on the first play, with LSU’s Booger McFarland recovering and giving the Tigers another opportunity to get on the scoreboard. LSU reached fourth down and attempted a fake field goal, but Faulk dropped the pass, turning the ball over on downs.

On the very next play, Alexander took the handoff and raced 73 yards for his second touchdown of the night. A blocked extra-point attempt kept the score at 13–0, but Alabama had seized control of the game.

Later in the third quarter, Alexander struck again, bursting through the LSU defense and racing 72 yards for his third touchdown of the night. Alabama’s failed two-point conversion kept the score at 19–0 heading into the fourth quarter.

LSU drove into Alabama territory early in the fourth quarter, but Sparacino’s pass was intercepted by Kevin Sigler, ending the threat. Later in the quarter, Alabama put together a 64-yard scoring drive in six plays, with Alexander once again finding the end zone for his fourth touchdown of the game.

The performance added to Alexander’s school-record 291-yard rushing effort, which remains the most rushing yards by an Alabama player in a single game. With the touchdown, Alabama extended its lead to 26–0. Sigler then intercepted Sparacino for the second time, putting the finishing touches on a dominant road victory and Alabama’s second shutout in three games.

Statistics	Alabama	LSU
First downs	19	9
Total yards	412	248
Rushing yards	351	52
Passing yards	61	196
Turnovers	1	3
Time of possession	35:58	24:02

Team	Category	Player	Statistics
Alabama	Passing	Freddie Kitchens	6–18, 61 yards
Alabama	Rushing	Shaun Alexander	20 carries, 291 yards, 4 TD's
Alabama	Receiving	Michael Vaughn	1 reception, 19 yards
LSU	Passing	Bryan Sparacino	8–35, 133 yards, 2 INT's
LSU	Rushing	Kevin Faulk	14 carries, 45 yards
LSU	Receiving	Larry Foster	3 receptions, 56 yards

=== Mississippi State ===
	1	2	3	4	Total
No. 8 Crimson Tide	0	13	0	3	16
Bulldogs	7	7	0	3	17

For the first time since 1980, and for the first time ever in Starkville, Alabama fell to Mississippi State in one of the biggest upsets of the Gene Stallings era.

Both teams traded punts on their first three possessions before Mississippi State finally broke through on its fourth. The Bulldogs marched 80 yards in 11 plays, with Robert Isaac capping the drive with a 17-yard touchdown run to give Mississippi State a 7–0 lead.

Alabama answered on its next possession, driving 65 yards in eight plays before Dennis Riddle scored on a three-yard touchdown run to tie the game at 7–7. After forcing a Mississippi State punt, Alabama had a chance to take control, but Freddie Kitchens made an ill-advised throw into coverage that was intercepted by Izell McGill, giving the Bulldogs possession inside the Alabama 20-yard line.

The Alabama defense nearly escaped the mistake, forcing Mississippi State into a third-and-23. Quarterback Derrick Taite threw a fade route that fell incomplete, but Alabama’s Kevin Jackson was flagged for pass interference, giving the Bulldogs a first down. On the very next play, Taite found Lamont Woodberry in the end zone for a 13-yard touchdown, putting Mississippi State back in front 14–7.

Warren Foust took over at quarterback on Alabama’s next possession and immediately led the Tide down the field. Alabama marched 11 plays before Shaun Alexander scored on a 12-yard touchdown run. Jon Brock missed the extra point wide right, however, leaving Alabama trailing 14–13 heading into halftime.

Alabama went three-and-out to open the second half, and Mississippi State took advantage by driving deep into Tide territory looking to extend its lead. The Bulldogs’ threat ended when Isaac fumbled the handoff, giving the ball back to Alabama and keeping the score 14–13.

The teams exchanged punts for the remainder of the third quarter, with Alabama failing to record a first down throughout the entire period.

Early in the fourth quarter, Alexander broke loose for a 40-yard run that moved Alabama into Mississippi State territory. The drive eventually stalled at the Bulldogs’ 25-yard line, but Brock connected on a 42-yard field goal to give Alabama its first lead of the night, 16–14.

Mississippi State answered immediately with its biggest play of the game. On the Bulldogs’ first play from scrimmage, Taite found Reggie Kelly for a 69-yard completion, moving Mississippi State deep into Alabama territory. The Tide defense stiffened and kept the Bulldogs out of the end zone, but Brian Hazelwood converted a 40-yard field goal to put Mississippi State back in front, 17–16, with less than nine minutes remaining.

Foust was intercepted by McGill on Alabama’s next possession, giving the Bulldogs another opportunity to put the game away. Hazelwood attempted to extend the lead with a 43-yard field goal, but the kick sailed badly wide left, keeping the deficit at just one point.

Kitchens returned at quarterback for Alabama’s next possession but was unable to move the offense, forcing the Tide to punt with 2:54 remaining. Alabama’s defense responded by forcing a three-and-out, giving the Tide one final opportunity with less than two minutes on the clock.

Alabama moved the ball into Mississippi State territory, but the comeback attempt ended at the Bulldogs’ 39-yard line when the Tide failed to convert on fourth down. Mississippi State took over and ran out the clock, securing a stunning 17–16 victory.

Statistics	Alabama	Mississippi State
First downs	16	16
Total yards	334	309
Rushing yards	229	157
Passing yards	105	152
Turnovers	2	1
Time of possession	27:55	32:05

Team	Category	Player	Statistics
Alabama	Passing	Freddie Kitchens	9–18, 93 yards, 1 INT
Alabama	Rushing	Shaun Alexander	15 carries, 106 yards, 1 TD
Alabama	Receiving	Calvin Hall	3 receptions, 27 yards
Mississippi State	Passing	Derrick Taite	8–20, 152 yards, 1 TD
Mississippi State	Rushing	Robert Isaac	21 carries, 96 yards, 1 TD
Mississippi State	Receiving	Reggie Kelly	1 reception, 69 yards

=== Auburn ===
	1	2	3	4	Total
Tigers	3	17	3	0	23
No. 15 Crimson Tide	17	0	0	7	24

Alabama used a dramatic last-minute drive to defeat Auburn 24–23, clinching the SEC West for the fourth time in five years in one of the most memorable Iron Bowl finishes of the Gene Stallings era.

Alabama got the ball to start the game and wasted little time finding the end zone, scoring on its fourth play from scrimmage. Freddie Kitchens connected with Curtis Alexander on a swing pass, and Alexander raced 63 yards for a touchdown to put Alabama on top 7–0.

After forcing a three-and-out, Alabama got the ball back and drove into Auburn territory, thanks in large part to a 32-yard completion from Kitchens to Marcel West that moved the Tide inside the Auburn 25-yard line. The Tigers’ defense stiffened, however, forcing Alabama to settle for a 37-yard field goal by Jon Brock to extend the lead to 10–0.

Auburn went three-and-out again, and Alabama took advantage by marching 61 yards in eight plays. The drive ended with Kitchens finding Michael Vaughn for a touchdown, giving the Tide a commanding 17–0 lead.

Auburn finally picked up its first first down of the game on a 42-yard run by Rusty Williams, which moved the Tigers inside the Alabama 20-yard line. The Tide defense held firm, forcing Auburn to settle for a 34-yard field goal by Jaret Holmes to put the Tigers on the board at 17–3.

After an Alabama punt, Auburn quarterback Dameyune Craig threw an interception to Fernando Bryant, giving Alabama possession at the Auburn 35-yard line and another opportunity to extend its lead. The Tide failed to pick up a first down and, rather than attempting a long field goal, elected to go for it on fourth-and-three. Shaun Alexander was tripped up in the backfield, however, turning the ball over on downs.

Auburn quickly capitalized on the momentum. Craig connected with Karsten Bailey for a 57-yard touchdown, capping a four-play scoring drive and cutting Alabama’s lead to 17–10.

Alabama moved back into Auburn territory on its next possession, but Dennis Riddle fumbled, ending the threat and giving the Tigers the ball back. After forcing an Auburn punt, Alabama was pinned deep at its own 5-yard line. On second down, Kitchens attempted to throw down the middle of the field to Calvin Hall, but the pass was intercepted by Brad Ware, who returned it 34 yards for a touchdown to tie the game at 17–17.

The Tide’s troubles continued on the ensuing kickoff when Marcel West fumbled, giving Auburn possession at the Alabama 20-yard line. Alabama’s defense once again prevented the Tigers from reaching the end zone, but Holmes converted a 33-yard field goal to give Auburn its first lead of the game, 20–17, heading into halftime.

Auburn received the ball to begin the second half and built on the momentum it had gained late in the first half, driving deep into Alabama territory and reaching the Tide’s 17-yard line. Alabama’s defense once again held firm, forcing Auburn to settle for another Holmes field goal, this one from 34 yards, to extend the Tigers’ lead to 23–17.

After an Alabama punt, Auburn attempted a play-action deep pass, but Kevin Jackson intercepted Craig’s pass to give the Tide possession. Auburn’s defense responded immediately, however, as Takeo Spikes intercepted Kitchens three plays later, giving the Tigers the ball in Alabama territory.

The Alabama defense once again came through, stopping Auburn and forcing a punt. Alabama moved into Auburn territory on its next possession, but Kitchens threw another interception, this time to Antwoine Nolan. The teams exchanged punts as the game moved into the fourth quarter, with Auburn holding a 23–17 lead.

Auburn’s second possession of the fourth quarter proved costly for Alabama, as the Tigers moved into Tide territory and used nearly five minutes of clock before eventually punting the ball back to Alabama.

The Tide moved into Auburn territory on its next possession, but a chop-block penalty followed by a sack on third-and-long pushed Alabama back and forced a punt with less than three minutes remaining.

Once again, Alabama’s defense answered the call, forcing Auburn into a three-and-out and giving the Tide one final opportunity to drive for the win.

With the game on the line, Alabama unveiled a formation it had not used in more than a year—the shotgun. After two incompletions, Kitchens got the drive moving by completing a pass to Shamari Buchanan for a first down. Two plays later, Kitchens found Riddle out of the backfield, and Riddle raced into Auburn territory for another first down. A short pass to Riddle on the following play moved the chains again.

Kitchens then scrambled out of the pocket and found a wide-open Vaughn near the back of the end zone. As the pass sailed toward Vaughn, Auburn’s Charles Ross tackled him in the end zone, drawing a pass-interference penalty and moving the ball inside the Auburn 20-yard line.

Kitchens scrambled for nine yards on the next play before connecting with Vaughn for a two-yard completion, setting up first-and-goal at the Auburn 6-yard line. After an incompletion on a swing pass to the right, Alabama went back to the same play to the left. This time, Riddle caught the pass, cut inside and crossed the goal line for the tying touchdown.

Jon Brock converted the extra point, giving Alabama a 24–23 lead with just 26 seconds remaining.

Auburn had one final opportunity to get into field-goal range, but the Tigers could not move the ball. Craig’s desperation Hail Mary on the final play of the game fell well short, sending Alabama to a dramatic 24–23 victory and clinching the SEC West championship.

After the game, Gene Stallings made another major announcement, telling reporters in his postgame press conference that he would retire at the end of the season.

Statistics	Auburn	Alabama
First downs	13	21
Total yards	296	434
Rushing yards	116	142
Passing yards	180	292
Turnovers	2	5
Time of possession	28:35	31:25

Team	Category	Player	Statistics
Auburn	Passing	Dameyune Craig	11–39, 180 yards, 1 TD, 2 INT's
Auburn	Rushing	Rusty Williams	17 carries, 89 yards
Auburn	Receiving	Karsten Bailey	5 receptions, 92 yards, 1 TD
Alabama	Passing	Freddie Kitchens	20–33, 292 yards, 3 TD's, 3 INT's
Alabama	Rushing	Dennis Riddle	21 carries, 131 yards
Alabama	Receiving	Curtis Alexander	1 reception, 63 yards, 1 TD

=== Florida ===
	1	2	3	4	Total
No. 11 Crimson Tide	7	7	14	2	30
No. 4 Gators	6	18	14	7	45

Florida captured its record-setting fourth consecutive SEC Championship, surviving a furious Alabama comeback before pulling away for a 45–30 victory.

The discussion during the two weeks leading up to the game centered less on the matchup itself and more on who would become Alabama’s next head coach. That question was answered in the Saturday morning newspaper, which reported that defensive coordinator Mike DuBose would be introduced as Alabama’s new head coach the following Monday.

Florida received the opening kickoff, but Alabama’s defense wasted no time making a big play. On the third play from scrimmage, a pass by Danny Wuerffel was batted into the air and intercepted by Ozell Powell, who returned it to the Florida 10-yard line to give Alabama excellent field position. The Gators’ defense held firm, however, and Jon Brock missed a 24-yard field goal wide right as the Tide failed to capitalize on the turnover.

After forcing a Florida three-and-out, Alabama got the ball back and took advantage of its second opportunity. Freddie Kitchens connected with Dennis Riddle for a 36-yard touchdown pass to give Alabama an early 7–0 lead.

Florida responded by driving into Alabama territory, but the Tide defense held and forced the Gators to punt. Alabama then went three-and-out, giving Florida another opportunity to attack. This time, Wuerffel connected with Ike Hilliard for a 46-yard touchdown pass. The extra-point attempt was blocked by Fernando Bryant, however, keeping Alabama in front 7–6.

Following another Alabama three-and-out, Florida carried its next drive into the second quarter and once again moved into Alabama territory. Wuerffel found Reidel Anthony for a 21-yard touchdown, and the Gators converted the two-point attempt to take their first lead of the game, 14–7.

Alabama went three-and-out once again, and Florida quickly made the Tide pay. The Gators marched 72 yards in just three plays, with Wuerffel connecting with Elijah Williams for a 45-yard touchdown to extend Florida’s lead to 21–7.

Another Alabama three-and-out gave Florida excellent field position as the Gators looked to add to their lead. Florida moved inside the Alabama 20-yard line, but the Tide defense stiffened and kept the Gators out of the end zone. Collins Cooper connected on a 35-yard field goal to extend Florida’s advantage to 24–7.

Alabama finally found some offensive rhythm on its next possession, picking up several first downs before eventually being forced to punt. This time, however, the Tide pinned Florida at its own 5-yard line. Alabama’s defense responded with a three-and-out, giving the offense one final opportunity to score before halftime.

The Tide took advantage, driving 50 yards before Kitchens connected with Michael Vaughn for an eight-yard touchdown pass to cut the deficit to 24–14. With less than 30 seconds remaining in the half, Wuerffel threw his second interception of the game, this time to Kevin Jackson. Alabama was unable to capitalize before time expired, and the score remained 24–14 at halftime.

Alabama opened the second half with the ball and moved into Florida territory, but the Gators once again prevented the Tide from scoring and forced a punt. Florida went three-and-out on the ensuing possession, but disaster struck on fourth down when punter Robby Stevenson dropped the snap and was tackled, fumbling the ball out of bounds at the 6-yard line. Alabama took advantage immediately, as Riddle scored on a six-yard touchdown run on the very next play to cut the deficit to 24–21.

Florida responded with a long drive of its own, moving into Alabama territory and converting a crucial fourth-and-five at the Alabama 30-yard line to keep the drive alive. Four plays later, Wuerffel found Anthony again, this time for a 13-yard touchdown pass to extend the Gators’ lead back to 31–21.

On the ensuing kickoff, Marcel West attempted to run the ball out of the end zone, but he was tackled at the 6-yard line, pinning Alabama deep in its own territory. Three plays later, Kitchens found a wide-open Vaughn behind the Florida defense, and Vaughn raced 94 yards for a touchdown. It was the longest play of the season and, at the time, the longest touchdown pass in SEC Championship Game history, cutting Florida’s lead to 31–28.

Florida answered immediately on its next possession. Wuerffel connected with Jacquez Green for an 85-yard touchdown pass, pushing the Gators’ lead back to 38–28.

After an Alabama punt, Wuerffel appeared to give the Tide another opportunity when he was stripped of the ball and Alabama’s Paul Pickett recovered. However, Alabama was flagged for being offsides, allowing Florida to retain possession. The Gators eventually capitalized, scoring on the first play of the fourth quarter when Wuerffel threw his sixth touchdown pass of the game—an SEC Championship Game record—and his third touchdown pass to Anthony. The score extended Florida’s lead to 45–28 and seemingly put the game out of reach.

Alabama refused to go quietly. After an Alabama punt, Florida attempted to run the ball and eat up the clock but fumbled an option pitch, giving the Tide possession at the Florida 32-yard line. Alabama drove all the way to the Florida 1-yard line, but the Gators’ defense made a goal-line stand and held Alabama out of the end zone, forcing a turnover on downs.

Florida was unable to move the ball from its own 1-yard line. Rather than risk punting from the end zone, the Gators took a safety, making the score 45–30.

Alabama’s final possession ended when Kitchens threw an interception to Fred Weary on fourth down. Florida then ran out the clock to secure the 45–30 victory and its fourth consecutive SEC Championship, a record that still stands today.

Statistics	Alabama	Florida
First downs	13	22
Total yards	296	470
Rushing yards	27	69
Passing yards	269	401
Turnovers	1	3
Time of possession	30:12	29:48

Team	Category	Player	Statistics
Alabama	Passing	Freddie Kitchens	19–45, 264 yards, 3 TD's, 1 INT
Alabama	Rushing	Dennis Riddle	17 carries, 42 yards, 1 TD
Alabama	Receiving	Michael Vaughn	5 receptions, 142 yards, 2 TD's
Florida	Passing	Danny Wuerffel	20–35, 401 yards, 6 TD's, 2 INT's
Florida	Rushing	Fred Taylor	23 carries, 83 yards
Florida	Receiving	Reidel Anthony	11 receptions, 171 yards, 3 TD's

=== Michigan ===
	1	2	3	4	Total
No. 16 Crimson Tide	3	0	0	14	17
No. 15 Wolverines	0	6	0	8	14

Two fourth-quarter touchdowns proved to be enough as Alabama secured its 10th win of the season and the 70th—and final—victory of Gene Stallings’ tenure as head coach.

Michigan received the opening kickoff and promptly went three-and-out. Paul Peristeris then shanked the punt, which rolled backward to the Michigan 27-yard line, giving Alabama excellent field position to begin its first drive. The Tide was unable to pick up a first down, but Jon Brock connected on a 44-yard field goal to give Alabama an early 3–0 lead.

After forcing another Michigan punt, Alabama drove into Wolverines territory, but Michigan’s defense stiffened and forced the Tide to punt. Michigan moved into Alabama territory on its next possession, thanks in large part to a 45-yard middle-screen pass from Brian Griese to Clarence Williams. Alabama’s defense once again held firm, forcing another Michigan punt.

The Wolverines moved into Alabama territory again on their next possession, this time finishing the drive with a 44-yard field goal by Remy Hamilton to tie the game at 3–3.

After the teams exchanged punts, Alabama quarterback Freddie Kitchens threw an interception on the second play of the Tide’s next possession, with Charles Woodson coming away with the pick and giving Michigan an opportunity to take the lead before halftime.

The Wolverines took advantage of the turnover, moving inside the Alabama 10-yard line after a successful fake field goal. Alabama’s defense once again prevented Michigan from reaching the end zone, forcing the Wolverines to settle for a 23-yard field goal by Hamilton. The kick gave Michigan a 6–3 lead heading into halftime.

After an Alabama punt to open the second half, Michigan drove into Alabama territory and appeared to have the perfect trick play dialed up for a touchdown. Griese threw a lateral to Woodson, who then threw the ball back to Griese with no defenders between him and the end zone. However, Griese stumbled after gaining just four yards, turning what looked like a sure touchdown into a missed opportunity. On the following play, Griese was sacked, forcing Michigan to punt.

After another Alabama punt, Michigan once again moved into Tide territory, but a third-down sack pushed the Wolverines backward and forced another punt. Alabama turned to Warren Foust at quarterback, and his mobility provided a spark to the offense as the Tide moved into Michigan territory. The drive came to an end, however, when Marcel West fumbled on a reverse, giving the ball back to Michigan.

The Wolverines drove into Alabama territory once again as the game moved into the fourth quarter, putting together their best scoring opportunity of the second half. Michigan moved inside the Alabama 10-yard line, but disaster struck on third down. Griese attempted to dump the ball off, but the pass was intercepted by Dwayne Rudd, who raced 87 yards for a touchdown to give Alabama its first lead of the game, 10–6.

Michigan attempted to answer immediately, driving back into Alabama territory and setting up a 48-yard field-goal attempt. Hamilton’s kick sailed wide right, however, keeping the score 10–6.

After forcing an Alabama punt, Michigan again moved into Tide territory, but Alabama’s defense stood strong once more and forced another Wolverine punt.

Then came Shaun Alexander.

Alexander took the handoff on five consecutive plays, helping Alabama march 77 yards down the field. He capped the drive with a 46-yard touchdown run with just over two minutes remaining, extending the Tide’s lead to 17–6.

Michigan refused to go quietly. The Wolverines drove 80 yards in nine plays, with Griese finding Russell Shaw for a touchdown. Michigan then converted the two-point attempt to cut Alabama’s lead to 17–14.

The Wolverines’ comeback attempt ended when Michigan failed to recover the ensuing onside kick. Alabama was able to run out the clock, securing a 17–14 victory and giving Stallings his 70th and final win as Alabama’s head coach.

The victory also gave Alabama its 10th win of the season, capping Stallings’ final regular season at the helm of the Crimson Tide.

Statistics	Alabama	Michigan
First downs	13	22
Total yards	247	415
Rushing yards	182	124
Passing yards	65	291
Turnovers	2	1
Time of possession	25:28	34:32

Team	Category	Player	Statistics
Alabama	Passing	Freddie Kitchens	9–18, 65 yards, 1 INT
Alabama	Rushing	Shaun Alexander	9 carries, 99 yards, 1 TD
Alabama	Receiving	Michael Vaughn	2 receptions, 27 yards
Michigan	Passing	Brian Griese	21–37, 287 yards, 1 TD, 1 INT
Michigan	Rushing	Clarence Williams	12 carries, 58 yards
Michigan	Receiving	Clarence Williams	5 receptions, 113 yards

== Coaching staff ==
Name	Position	Consecutive seasons at Alabama
Gene Stallings	Head coach	7th
Woody McCorvey	Offensive coordinator	7th
Dabo Swinney	Wide receivers and Tight end coach	4th
Danny Pearman	Offensive tackles coach/Special teams coordinator	6th
Jim Fuller	Offensive line Coach	13th
Randy Ross	Quarterbacks coach/recruiting coordinator	7th
Ivy Williams	Running backs coach	3rd
Mike DuBose	Defensive coordinator/defensive line	7th
Curley Hallman	Secondary coach	1st
Jeff Rouzie	Linebackers coach	6th
Mickey Conn	Graduate assistant	1st
