= 1997 Outback Bowl =

- 11th Outback Bowl
Alabama Crimson Tide	Michigan Wolverines
(9–3)	(8–3)
SEC	Big Ten
17	14
Head coach: Gene Stallings	Head coach: Lloyd Carr
AP / Coaches / BA; 16 / 15 / 15	AP / Coaches / BA; 15 / 17 / 17
	1	2	3	4	Total
Alabama	3	0	0	14	17
Michigan	0	6	0	8	14
- Date: January 1, 1997
- Season: 1996
- Stadium: Houlihan's Stadium
- Location: Tampa, Florida
- MVP: Dwayne Rudd, Alabama LB
- Referee: Michael Dover (ACC)
- Attendance: 53,161

United States TV coverage
- Network: ESPN
- Announcers: Ron Franklin, Mike Gottfried

The 1997 Outback Bowl, part of the 1996 bowl game season, took place on January 1, 1997, at Houlihan's Stadium in Tampa, Florida. The 11th edition of the Outback Bowl featured the Alabama Crimson Tide, representing the Southeastern Conference (SEC), and the Michigan Wolverines of the Big Ten Conference. Alabama was victorious in by a final score of 17–14.

== Teams ==
=== Alabama ===
The 1996 Alabama squad finished the regular season as the SEC Western Division champions with losses to Tennessee and Mississippi State. Following their victory against Auburn in the Iron Bowl, head coach Gene Stallings announced his retirement effective following the bowl game. One week later, Alabama lost to Florida in the SEC Championship Game, to finish the regular season with a 9–3 record. The following day, university officials announced a bid to play in the Outback Bowl was accepted. The appearance marked the second for Alabama in the Outback Bowl, and their 48th overall bowl game.

=== Michigan ===
The 1996 Michigan squad finished the regular season with losses to Northwestern, Purdue and Penn State to finish with a record of 8–3. Their appearance marked the third for Michigan in the Outback Bowl, and their 28th overall bowl game.

== Game summary ==
Alabama scored first on a 43-yard field goal from placekicker Jon Brock to take an early 3–0 lead. Remy Hamilton of Michigan answered in the second quarter with 44 and 22-yard field goals to take a 6–3 advantage at the half. In the fourth quarter, Michigan was driving for another touchdown, when Brian Griese threw a pass that was intercepted at the 12-yard line by Dwayne Rudd of Alabama, and returned 88-yards for a touchdown, and a 10–6 Alabama lead. Running back Shaun Alexander put the game out of reach with 2:46 left, by running for a 46-yard touchdown run, increasing Alabama's lead to 17–6. Griese threw a 9-yard touchdown pass to Russell Shaw to close the gap to 17–14, but that would be the final score.

Scoring summary

Quarter	Time	Drive			Team	Scoring information	Score	
Quarter	Time	Plays	Yards	TOP	Team	Scoring information	Alabama	Michigan
1	11:18		4 plays, 2 yards		Alabama	43-yard field goal by Jon Brock	3	0
2	8:03		11 plays, 43 yards		Michigan	44-yard field goal by Remy Hamilton	3	3
2	0:20		8 plays, 30 yards		Michigan	22-yard field goal by Remy Hamilton	3	6
4	12:13		1 play, 88 yards		Alabama	Interception returned 88 yards for touchdown by Dwayne Rudd, Jon Brock kick good	10	6
4	2:15		5 plays, 77 yards		Alabama	Shaun Alexander 46-yard touchdown run, Jon Brock kick good	17	6
4	1:16		9 plays, 80 yards		Michigan	Russell Shaw 9-yard touchdown reception from Brian Griese, 2-point run good	17	14
"TOP" = time of possession. For other American football terms, see Glossary of American football.							17	14
