= 1996 Kentucky Wildcats football team =

American college football season

1996 Kentucky Wildcats football
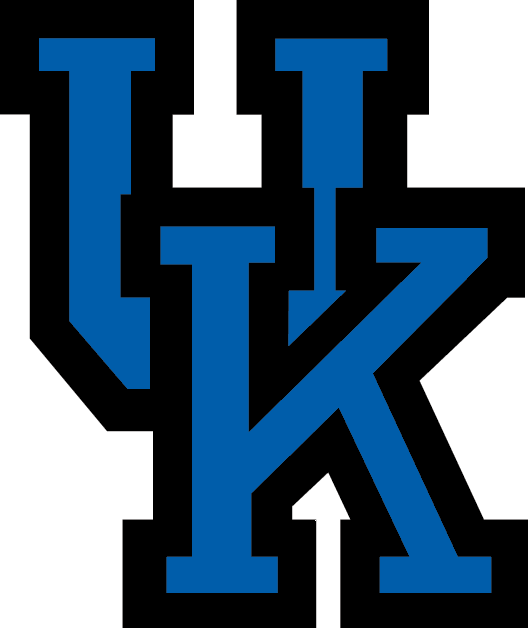
- Conference: Southeastern Conference
- Eastern Division
- Record: 4–7 (3–5 SEC)
- Head coach: Bill Curry (7th season)
- Offensive coordinator: Elliot Uzelac (2nd season)
- Offensive scheme: Multiple
- Defensive coordinator: Rick Smith (1st season)
- Base defense: 4–3
- Home stadium: Commonwealth Stadium

1996 Southeastern Conference football standings
	Conf.			Overall
Team	W		L	W		L
Eastern Division
No. 1 Florida x$	8	–	0	12	–	1
No. 9 Tennessee	7	–	1	10	–	2
South Carolina	4	–	4	6	–	5
Kentucky	3	–	5	4	–	7
Georgia	3	–	5	5	–	6
Vanderbilt	0	–	8	2	–	9
Western Division
No. 11 Alabama xy	6	–	2	10	–	3
No. 12 LSU x	6	–	2	10	–	2
No. 24 Auburn	4	–	4	8	–	4
Mississippi State	3	–	5	5	–	6
Ole Miss	2	–	6	5	–	6
Arkansas	2	–	6	4	–	7
Championship: Florida 45, Alabama 30
$ – Conference champion; x – Division champion/co-champions; y – Championship game participant; Rankings from AP Poll

The 1996 Kentucky Wildcats football team represented the University of Kentucky in the 1996 NCAA Division I-A football season. The Wildcats scored 138 points while allowing 322 points; they opened the season with 1 win and 6 losses, and then after the firing of head coach Bill Curry was announced, the Wildcats won three straight SEC games before losing their final game to finish 4–7.

Kentucky opened with a 38–14 loss to Louisville, then lost 24–3 at Cincinnati due to repeated special teams breakdowns. A game in a driving rainstorm against Indiana remained a scoreless tie until the final seconds when a Kentucky field goal led to a 3–0 win. A 65–0 loss at Florida and 35–7 loss at Alabama were followed by Kentucky blowing a second half lead to lose 25–14 to South Carolina. After a 41–14 loss at LSU, Kentucky stood at 1–5 on the season and the firing of head coach Bill Curry was announced. The Wildcats responded by reeling off three victories in a row: 24–17 against Georgia, 24–21 against Mississippi State and 25–0 against Vanderbilt. A 56–10 loss to Tennessee ended the season with the Wildcats at 4–7.

Kentucky's victories over Georgia and Mississippi State kept those two teams out of bowl games, as each finished 5–6 due to their losses to Kentucky. Kentucky's 25–0 shutout of Vanderbilt on November 16 was the team's first shutout since a 21–0 win against #25 Ole Miss on October 2, 1993. Kentucky played four road games against ranked teams in 1996. Kentucky's three game SEC win streak (Georgia, Mississippi State and Vanderbilt) was its first since 1993 (South Carolina, Ole Miss, LSU). This was the first college season for highly touted freshman quarterback Tim Couch, who later went on to be a finalist for the Heisman Trophy and was the #1 overall pick in the 1999 NFL draft.

== Schedule ==
Date	Time	Opponent	Site	TV	Result	Attendance	Source
August 31	6:30 p.m.	Louisville*	Commonwealth Stadium; Lexington, KY (Governor's Cup)		L 14–38	59,384	
September 7	3:30 p.m.	at Cincinnati*	Nippert Stadium; Cincinnati, OH		L 3–24	30,729	
September 21	7:00 p.m.	Indiana*	Commonwealth Stadium; Lexington, KY (rivalry)		W 3–0	40,500	
September 28	3:30 p.m.	at No. 1 Florida	Ben Hill Griffin Stadium; Gainesville, FL (rivalry)	CBS	L 0–65	85,422	
October 5	2:00 p.m.	at No. 13 Alabama	Bryant–Denny Stadium; Tuscaloosa, AL	PPV	L 7–35	70,123	
October 12	7:00 p.m.	South Carolina	Commonwealth Stadium; Lexington, KY		L 14–25	50,500	
October 19	8:00 p.m.	at No. 17 LSU	Tiger Stadium; Baton Rouge, LA	PPV	L 14–41	79,660	
October 26	7:00 p.m.	Georgia	Commonwealth Stadium; Lexington, KY		W 24–17	34,000	
November 9	1:30 p.m.	Mississippi State	Commonwealth Stadium; Lexington, KY		W 24–21	26,500	
November 16	12:30 p.m.	Vanderbilt	Commonwealth Stadium; Lexington, KY (rivalry)	JPS	W 25–0	33,000	
November 23	3:30 p.m.	at No. 9 Tennessee	Neyland Stadium; Knoxville, TN (rivalry)	CBS	L 10–56	102,534	
*Non-conference game; Rankings from AP Poll released prior to the game; All times are in Eastern time

== Roster ==
1996 Kentucky Wildcats football team roster
Players
Coaches
Offense

Pos.	#	Name	Class
QB	2	Tim Couch	Fr
QB	7	Billy Jack Haskins	Jr

Defense

Pos.	#	Name	Class
DB	17	Van Hiles	Jr
DE	47	Chris Ward	Sr

Special teams

Pos.	#	Name	Class

Head coach

- Bill Curry (Georgia Tech)

Coordinators/assistant coaches

- Elliot Uzelac
  Offensive Coordinator
- Rick Smith
  Defensive Coordinator

Legend

- (C) Team captain
- (S) Suspended
- (I) Ineligible
- Injured
- Redshirt

== Team players in the 1997 NFL draft ==
Player	Position	Round	Pick	NFL club
Van Hiles	Defensive back	5	141	Chicago Bears
Chris Ward	Defensive end	7	205	Baltimore Ravens

== Postseason ==
Leading rusher Derick Logan, the SEC Freshman Player of the Year, did not return. Head coach Bill Curry was replaced by Hal Mumme. Sometime-starting quarterback Billy Jack Haskins transferred to Rhode Island after Mumme announced that Tim Couch would take the starting spot.
