= Elijah Williams (defensive back) =

American football player (born 1975)

No. 21, 25
- Positions: Defensive back, running back

Personal information
- Born: August 20, 1975 (age 51); Milton, Florida, U.S.
- Listed height: 5 ft 10 in (1.78 m)
- Listed weight: 180 lb (82 kg)

Career information
- High school: Milton
- College: Florida (1994–1997)
- NFL draft: 1998: 6th round, 166th overall pick

Career history
- Atlanta Falcons (1998–2001)

Awards and highlights
- Bowl Alliance National Championship (1996)

Career NFL statistics
- Games played: 50
- Total tackles: 66
- Pass deflections: 6
- Interceptions: 1
- Return yards: 203
- Stats at Pro Football Reference

Elijah Elgebra Williams (born August 20, 1975) is an American former professional football player who was a defensive back and kick returner for four seasons with the Atlanta Falcons of the National Football League (NFL) during the late 1990s and early 2000s. Williams played college football for the Florida Gators, and thereafter he played in the NFL for the Falcons.

== Early life ==
Williams was born in Milton, Florida in 1975. He attended Milton High School, and played high school football for the Milton Panthers.

== College career ==
Williams accepted an athletic scholarship to attend the University of Florida in Gainesville, Florida, where he was a running back for coach Steve Spurrier's Florida Gators football teams from 1994 to 1997. Memorably, he ran for 109 yards versus LSU Tigers and 116 yards against the Auburn Tigers in 1996 Williams led the Gators in rushing yardage in 1995 and 1996, and finished his four-year college career with 3,023 all-purpose yards—2,181 rushing and 842 receiving. During his four college seasons, the Florida Gators won Southeastern conference (SEC) championships in 1994, 1995 and 1996, and the 1996 national championship when they defeated the Florida State Seminoles 52–20 in the Sugar Bowl. He was chosen as a senior team captain in 1997.

Williams returned to Gainesville when his NFL career was over, and graduated from the University of Florida with a bachelor's degree in health science education in 2003.

== Professional career ==
Pre-draft measurables
Height	Weight	Arm length	Hand span	Vertical jump	Broad jump	Bench press
5 ft 9 1/2 in (1.77 m)	178 lb (81 kg)	30 1/2 in (0.77 m)	9 5/8 in (0.24 m)	37.5 in (0.95 m)	10 ft 2 in (3.10 m)	10 reps

The Atlanta Falcons chose Williams in the sixth round (166th pick overall) in the 1998 NFL draft. He played for the Falcons in fifty games over four seasons from 1998 to 2001. He saw limited action as a running back, and played mostly on special teams as a kick returner and as a backup defensive back.

== Life after the NFL ==
Williams worked as a high school football coach from 2005 to 2012. He was formerly the head coach for the Oak Ridge Pioneers football team of Oak Ridge High School in Orlando, Florida. He was also an assistant coach at Astronaut high school in Titusville, Fl.

Williams is currently the head coach at Jones High School.

== See also ==
- Florida Gators football, 1990–99
- History of the Atlanta Falcons
- List of Florida Gators in the NFL draft
- List of University of Florida alumni
