= 1996 Clemson Tigers football team =

American college football season

1996 Clemson Tigers football

Peach Bowl, L 7–10 vs. LSU
- Conference: Atlantic Coast Conference
- Record: 7–5 (6–2 ACC)
- Head coach: Tommy West (3rd season)
- Offensive coordinator: Darrell Moody (1st season)
- Defensive coordinator: Ellis Johnson (1st season)
- Captain: Dexter McCleon
- Home stadium: Memorial Stadium

1996 Atlantic Coast Conference football standings
	Conf.			Overall
Team	W		L	W		L
No. 3 Florida State $	8	–	0	11	–	1
No. 10 North Carolina	6	–	2	10	–	2
Clemson	6	–	2	7	–	5
Virginia	5	–	3	7	–	5
Georgia Tech	4	–	4	5	–	6
Maryland	3	–	5	5	–	6
NC State	3	–	5	3	–	8
Wake Forest	1	–	7	3	–	8
Duke	0	–	8	0	–	11
$ – Conference champion; Rankings from AP Poll

The 1996 Clemson Tigers football team represented Clemson University as a member of the Atlantic Coast Conference (ACC) during the 1996 NCAA Division I-A football season. Led by third-year head coach Tommy West, the Tigers compiled an overall record of 7–5 with a mark of 6–2 in conference play, tying for second place in the ACC. Clemson was invited to the Peach Bowl, where the Tigers lost to LSU. The team played home games at Memorial Stadium in Clemson, South Carolina.

== Schedule ==
Date	Time	Opponent	Rank	Site	TV	Result	Attendance	Source
August 31	3:30 p.m.	at North Carolina		Kenan Memorial Stadium; Chapel Hill, NC	ABC	L 0–45	45,700	
September 7	12:00 p.m.	Furman*		Memorial Stadium; Clemson, SC	JPS	W 19–3	62,243	
September 21	7:00 p.m.	at Missouri*		Faurot Field; Columbia, MO	FSN	L 24–38	39,128	
September 28	12:00 p.m.	Wake Forest		Memorial Stadium; Clemson, SC	JPS	W 21–10	63,263	
October 5	7:00 p.m.	at No. 2 Florida State		Doak Campbell Stadium; Tallahassee, FL (rivalry)	ESPN	L 3–34	76,360	
October 12	12:00 p.m.	at Duke		Wallace Wade Stadium; Durham, NC	JPS	W 13–6	23,586	
October 19	3:30 p.m.	No. 22 Georgia Tech		Memorial Stadium; Clemson, SC (rivalry)	ABC	W 28–25	70,578	
November 2	3:30 p.m.	Maryland		Memorial Stadium; Clemson, SC	ABC	W 35–3	60,584	
November 9	3:30 p.m.	at No. 15 Virginia		Scott Stadium; Charlottesville, VA	ABC	W 24–16	39,100	
November 16	12:00 p.m.	NC State		Memorial Stadium; Clemson, SC (Textile Bowl)	JPS	W 40–17	63,796	
November 23	5:30 p.m.	South Carolina*	No. 22	Memorial Stadium; Clemson, SC (rivalry)	ESPN2	L 31–34	82,929	
December 28	8:00 p.m.	vs. No. 17 LSU*		Georgia Dome; Atlanta, GA (Peach Bowl)	ESPN	L 7–10	63,622	
*Non-conference game; Rankings from AP Poll released prior to the game; All times are in Eastern time

== Rankings ==
Ranking movements Legend: ██ Increase in ranking ██ Decrease in ranking — = Not ranked
	Week																	
Poll	Pre	1	2	3	4	5	6	7	8	9	10	11	12	13	14	15	16	Final
AP	25	—	—	—	—	—	—	—	—	—	—	—	—	22	—	—	—	—
Coaches	23		—	—	—	—	—	—	—	—	—	—	—	24	—	—	—	—

== Roster ==
1996 Clemson Tigers football team roster
Players
Coaches
Offense

Pos.	#	Name	Class
WR	2	Joe Woods	Sr
WR	3	Kenya Crooks	Jr
QB	13	Billy Luckie	Fr
QB	14	Brandon Streeter	Fr
QB	15	Nealon Greene	Jr
WR	16	Justin Watts	Fr
FB	18	Emory Smith	Sr
OT	61	Mark Landry	Jr
OL	62	Hamid Salim	Sr
OT	77	Matt Butler	So
OT	78	Ed Altman	Jr
OT	79	Jim Bundren	Jr
TE	82	Lamont Hall	Jr
TE	83	Will Clark	Fr

Defense

Pos.	#	Name	Class
FS	1	Antuan Edwards	So
DE	8	Trevor Pryce	Jr
CB	9	Dexter McCleon	Sr
SS	10	Michael Allen	So
SS	28	Andre Carter	GS
CB	29	Peter Ford	Sr
SS	31	Brad Pope	Sr
OLB	53	Rahim Abdullah	Fr
ILB	56	O. J. Childress	So
LB	57	Chris Jones	So
DL	59	Jason Martinelli	Fr
DL	91	Lorenzo Bromell	Fr

Special teams

Pos.	#	Name	Class

Head coach

- Tommy West

Coordinators/assistant coaches

- Charlie Harbison (defensive backs)
- Ellis Johnson (defensive coordinator / outside linebackers)

Legend

- (C) Team captain
- (S) Suspended
- (I) Ineligible
- Injured
- Redshirt

Roster
