= Kevin Jackson (American football) =

American football player (born 1973)

Profile
- Position: Safety

Personal information
- Born: October 27, 1973 (age 53); Dothan, Alabama, U.S.
- Listed height: 6 ft 2 in (1.88 m)
- Listed weight: 206 lb (93 kg)

Career information
- High school: Northview (Dothan)
- College: Alabama

Career history
- 1997: Arizona Cardinals*
- 1998: Tampa Bay Storm
- 1999, 2001: Buffalo Destroyers
- * Offseason or practice squad member only

Awards and highlights
- Unanimous All-American (1996); 2× First-team All-SEC (1995, 1996)

Kevin Jackson (born October 27, 1973) is an American former football safety. He played college football for the Alabama Crimson Tide football for the 1995 and 1996 seasons. After the 1996 season, he was recognized as a unanimous All-American. After going undrafted and signing briefly with the Arizona Cardinals of the National Football League (NFL), Jackson also played professionally with both the Tampa Bay Storm and Buffalo Destroyers of the Arena Football League (AFL).

== College career ==
Jackson originally committed to Alabama in 1992; however, he was not signed at that time as he was unable to qualify academically. Instead, he utilized his first two years of eligibility to play defensive back at Jones County Junior College in Ellisville, Mississippi. During his tenure at Jones County, Jackson compiled 105 tackles, five interceptions and blocked two kicks.

Starting at defensive back for the Crimson Tide for the 1995 squad, against Georgia Jackson had ten tackles and three interceptions and was named the SEC Defensive Player of the Week for his performance. The three interceptions in a single still remains tied for the most in a single game by an Alabama player. At the conclusion of the 1995 season, Jackson was named First-team All-SEC by The Birmingham News after he finished the season with 62 tackles and five interceptions.

For the 1996 season, Jackson had 72 tackles and led the SEC with his seven interceptions. In recognition for his on-field performance, he was recognized as a unanimous selection to the 1996 College Football All-America Team.

=== Career college statistics ===
Year	School	GP–GS	Tackles			Sacks	Pass defense		Fumbles		Blocked
Year	School	GP–GS	Solo	Ast	Total	No–Yards	Int–Yards	BU	Rcv–Yards	FF	Kick
1995	Alabama	12–12	38	24	62	0–0	5–?	2	0–0	0	0
1996	Alabama	12–12	43	29	72	4–19	7–44	5	0–0	0	0

== Professional career ==
After not being selected in the 1997 NFL draft, Jackson signed as an undrafted free agent by the Arizona Cardinals in April 1997. He was later waived by the team during training camp in August 1997. Jackson later signed with the Tampa Bay Storm of the Arena Football League in January 1998, but never played a game with the Storm after he was placed on injured reserve. After the season, he was left unprotected by the Storm and was taken by the Buffalo Destroyers in the 1998 expansion draft. Jackson then played two seasons with the Destroyers in 1999 and 2001.
