= 1996 Arkansas Razorbacks football team =

American college football season

1996 Arkansas Razorbacks football
- Conference: Southeastern Conference
- Western Division
- Record: 4–7 (2–6 SEC)
- Head coach: Danny Ford (4th season)
- Defensive coordinator: Miles Aldridge (1st season)
- Captains: Scott Rivers; Mark Smith
- Home stadium: Razorback Stadium; War Memorial Stadium

1996 Southeastern Conference football standings
	Conf.			Overall
Team	W		L	W		L
Eastern Division
No. 1 Florida x$	8	–	0	12	–	1
No. 9 Tennessee	7	–	1	10	–	2
South Carolina	4	–	4	6	–	5
Kentucky	3	–	5	4	–	7
Georgia	3	–	5	5	–	6
Vanderbilt	0	–	8	2	–	9
Western Division
No. 11 Alabama xy	6	–	2	10	–	3
No. 12 LSU x	6	–	2	10	–	2
No. 24 Auburn	4	–	4	8	–	4
Mississippi State	3	–	5	5	–	6
Ole Miss	2	–	6	5	–	6
Arkansas	2	–	6	4	–	7
Championship: Florida 45, Alabama 30
$ – Conference champion; x – Division champion/co-champions; y – Championship game participant; Rankings from AP Poll

The 1996 Arkansas Razorbacks football team represented the University of Arkansas as a member of the Western Division of the Southeastern Conference (SEC) during the 1996 NCAA Division I-A football season. Led by fourth-year head coach Danny Ford, the Razorbacks compiled an overall record of 4–7, with a mark of 2–6 in conference play, and finished tied for fifth in the SEC Western Division.

== Schedule ==
Date	Time	Opponent	Site	TV	Result	Attendance	Source
September 7	2:00 p.m.	SMU*	Razorback Stadium; Fayetteville, AR		L 10–23	44,695	
September 21	11:30 a.m.	No. 13 Alabama	War Memorial Stadium; Little Rock, AR	JPS	L 7–17	54,827	
September 28	6:00 p.m.	Northeast Louisiana*	War Memorial Stadium; Little Rock, AR		W 38–21	48,816	
October 5	11:30 a.m.	No. 1 Florida	Razorback Stadium; Fayetteville, AR	JPS	L 7–42	52,318	
October 12	6:00 p.m.	Louisiana Tech*	War Memorial Stadium; Little Rock, AR		W 38–21	46,341	
October 19	6:00 p.m.	at South Carolina	Williams–Brice Stadium; Columbia, SC		L 17–23	79,419	
November 2	6:00 p.m.	at No. 24 Auburn	Jordan-Hare Stadium; Auburn, AL	ESPN2	L 7–28	84,763	
November 9	1:00 p.m.	Ole Miss	Razorback Stadium; Fayetteville, AR (rivalry)		W 13–7	42,536	
November 16	11:30 a.m.	at No. 12 Tennessee	Neyland Stadium; Knoxville, TN	JPS	L 14–55	103,158	
November 23	1:30 p.m.	at Mississippi State	Scott Field; Starkville, MS		W 16–13 ^{OT}	30,103	
November 29	1:30 p.m.	No. 19 LSU	War Memorial Stadium; Little Rock, AR (rivalry)	CBS	L 7–17	22,329	
*Non-conference game; Rankings from AP Poll released prior to the game; All times are in Central time
