= 1996 LSU Tigers football team =

American college football season

1996 LSU Tigers football

SEC Western Division co-champion Peach Bowl champion

Peach Bowl, W 10–7 vs. Clemson
- Conference: Southeastern Conference
- Western Division

Ranking
- Coaches: No. 13
- AP: No. 12
- Record: 10–2 (6–2 SEC)
- Head coach: Gerry DiNardo (2nd season)
- Offensive coordinator: Morris Watts (2nd season)
- Offensive scheme: Multiple
- Defensive coordinator: Carl Reese (2nd season)
- Base defense: 4–3
- Home stadium: Tiger Stadium

1996 Southeastern Conference football standings
	Conf.			Overall
Team	W		L	W		L
Eastern Division
No. 1 Florida x$	8	–	0	12	–	1
No. 9 Tennessee	7	–	1	10	–	2
South Carolina	4	–	4	6	–	5
Kentucky	3	–	5	4	–	7
Georgia	3	–	5	5	–	6
Vanderbilt	0	–	8	2	–	9
Western Division
No. 11 Alabama xy	6	–	2	10	–	3
No. 12 LSU x	6	–	2	10	–	2
No. 24 Auburn	4	–	4	8	–	4
Mississippi State	3	–	5	5	–	6
Ole Miss	2	–	6	5	–	6
Arkansas	2	–	6	4	–	7
Championship: Florida 45, Alabama 30
$ – Conference champion; x – Division champion/co-champions; y – Championship game participant; Rankings from AP Poll

The 1996 LSU Tigers football team represented Louisiana State University (LSU) in the 1996 NCAA Division I-A football season. LSU finished with a 10–2 overall record (6–2 in SEC play) after defeating Clemson Tigers, 10–7, in the Peach Bowl. It was Gerry DiNardo's second season as head coach and the Tigers built upon the previous year's success with their first ten-win season and bowl win since 1987. The Tigers tied for the SEC West title with Alabama, but had lost to the Tide 26–0 in Baton Rouge in a game that was notable for being Shaun Alexander's breakout performance.

== Schedule ==
Date	Time	Opponent	Rank	Site	TV	Result	Attendance	Source
September 7	7:00 p.m.	Houston*	No. 17	Tiger Stadium; Baton Rouge, LA		W 35–34	80,303	
September 21	6:30 p.m.	at No. 13 Auburn	No. 21	Jordan-Hare Stadium; Auburn, AL (rivalry)	ESPN	W 19–15	85,214	
September 28	7:00 p.m.	New Mexico State*^{†}	No. 17	Tiger Stadium; Baton Rouge, LA		W 63–7	77,676	
October 5	7:00 p.m.	Vanderbilt	No. 14	Tiger Stadium; Baton Rouge, LA		W 35–0	80,142	
October 12	11:00 a.m.	at No. 1 Florida	No. 12	Ben Hill Griffin Stadium; Gainesville, FL (rivalry)	CBS	L 13–56	85,567	
October 19	7:00 p.m.	Kentucky	No. 17	Tiger Stadium; Baton Rouge, LA		W 41–14	79,660	
October 26	11:30 a.m.	Mississippi State	No. 13	Tiger Stadium; Baton Rouge, LA (rivalry)	JPS	W 28–20	79,594	
November 9	6:30 p.m.	No. 10 Alabama	No. 11	Tiger Stadium; Baton Rouge, LA (rivalry, College GameDay)	ESPN	L 0–26	80,290	
November 16	2:00 p.m.	at Ole Miss	No. 17	Vaught–Hemingway Stadium; Oxford, MS (rivalry)	PPV	W 39–7	44,436	
November 23	7:00 p.m.	Tulane*	No. 18	Tiger Stadium; Baton Rouge, LA (Battle for the Rag)		W 35–17	78,966	
November 29	1:30 p.m.	at Arkansas	No. 19	War Memorial Stadium; Little Rock, AR (rivalry)	CBS	W 17–7	22,329	
December 28	8:00 p.m.	vs. Clemson*	No. 17	Georgia Dome; Atlanta, GA (Peach Bowl)	ESPN	W 10–7	63,622	
*Non-conference game; ^{†}Homecoming; Rankings from AP Poll released prior to the game; All times are in Central time

== Roster ==
1996 LSU Tigers football team roster
Players
Coaches
Offense

Pos.	#	Name	Class
TB	1	Jermaine Sharp	Sr
RB	3	Kevin Faulk	So
TE	47	David LaFleur	Sr
G	66	Alan Faneca	So

Defense

Pos.	#	Name	Class
LB	48	Joe Wesley	So
DT	94	Booger McFarland	So
DE	98	Arnold Miller	So
DE	99	David Watkins	Fr

Special teams

Pos.	#	Name	Class

Head coach

- Gerry DiNardo (2nd season)

Coordinators/assistant coaches

- Morris Watts – Offensive coordinator/quarterbacks
- Michael Haywood – Running backs
- Bob McConnell – Wide receiver
- David Kelly – Tight ends
- Hal Hunter – Offensive line
- Carl Reese – Defensive coordinator/defensive backs
- Jerry Baldwin – Defensive ends
- Mike Tolleson – Defensive tackles
- Bill Elias Jr. – Linebackers
- Bo Davis – Graduate assistant

Legend

- (C) Team captain
- (S) Suspended
- (I) Ineligible
- Injured
- Redshirt

Roster
