= Rod Dowhower =

American football player and coach (born 1943)

Biographical details
- Born: April 15, 1943 (age 83); Ord, Nebraska, U.S.

Playing career
- 1963–1965: San Diego State
- Position: Quarterback

Coaching career (HC unless noted)
- 1966: San Diego State (GA)
- 1967: San Diego State (QB/WR)
- 1968–1972: San Diego State (OC)
- 1973: St. Louis Cardinals (QB/WR)
- 1974–1975: UCLA (OC)
- 1976: Boise State (OC)
- 1977–1978: Stanford (WR)
- 1979: Stanford
- 1980: Denver Broncos (OC)
- 1981–1982: Denver Broncos (WR)
- 1983–1984: St. Louis Cardinals (OC/QB)
- 1985–1986: Indianapolis Colts
- 1987–1989: Atlanta Falcons (OC)
- 1990–1992: Washington Redskins (QB)
- 1993: Washington Redskins (OC)
- 1994: Cleveland Browns (QB)
- 1995–1996: Vanderbilt
- 1997–1998: New York Giants (QB)
- 1999–2001: Philadelphia Eagles (OC)

Head coaching record
- Overall: 9–23–1 (college); 5–24 (NFL)

Accomplishments and honors

Championships
- Super Bowl champion (XXVI)

Rodney Douglas Dowhower (born April 15, 1943) is an American former football player and coach. He was the head coach at Stanford University and Vanderbilt University; in between he was the head coach of the Indianapolis Colts of the National Football League (NFL).

A graduate of Santa Barbara High School, Dowhower quarterbacked the Dons football team to the CIF Southern Section 4-A Division championship in 1960, defeating Centennial High School of Compton 19–6 at the Los Angeles Memorial Coliseum. Dowhower went on to star at San Diego State and later became an assistant for his coach Don Coryell, serving as Aztecs offensive coordinator for five seasons. When Coryell left to become head coach of the St. Louis Cardinals in 1973, Dowhower followed him and served one season as wide receivers coach. Returning to the college ranks, Dowhower served as offensive coordinator at UCLA for two seasons under Dick Vermeil, then spent one season in the same role at Boise State.

In 1977, Dowhower became wide receivers coach for Stanford under new head coach Bill Walsh. After two seasons on staff, Dowhower was promoted to head coach at Stanford on January 9, 1979, a day after Walsh announced his departure to lead the NFL's San Francisco 49ers, After leading the Cardinal to a 5–5–1 record in 1979, he left in January 1980 to become the offensive coordinator for the NFL's Denver Broncos under head coach Red Miller. With a change in ownership in February 1981, Dan Reeves became the head coach the following month; Dowhower stayed on staff as the receivers coach.

Dowhower was later the head coach for two seasons at Vanderbilt (1995, 1996), but won just four games for a career college football record of 9–23–1 (.288). Previously, he was the head coach of the NFL's Indianapolis Colts for two years (1985, 1986), where he tallied a record of 5–24 (.172), and was fired after losing the first thirteen games in 1986.

Dowhower attended San Diego State University, where he played quarterback for the Aztecs. He served as an assistant coach at San Diego State, UCLA, and Boise State. Dowhower was an assistant coach for seven NFL teams: the St. Louis Cardinals, Denver Broncos, Atlanta Falcons, Washington Redskins, Cleveland Browns (under Bill Belichick), New York Giants, and the Philadelphia Eagles.

== Head coaching record ==
=== College ===
Year	Team	Overall	Conference	Standing	Bowl/playoffs
Stanford Cardinals (Pacific-10 Conference) (1979)
1979	Stanford	5–5–1	3–3–1	6th	
Stanford:		5–5–1	3–3–1		
Vanderbilt Commodores (Southeastern Conference) (1995–1996)
1995	Vanderbilt	2–9	1–7	6th (Eastern)	
1996	Vanderbilt	2–9	0–8	6th (Eastern)	
Vanderbilt:		4–18	1–15		
Total:		9–23–1			

=== NFL ===
Team	Year	Regular season					Postseason			
Team	Year	Won	Lost	Ties	Win %	Finish	Won	Lost	Win %	Result
IND	1985	5	11	0	.313	4th in AFC East	–	–	–	–
IND	1986	0	13	0	.000	5th in AFC East	–	–	–	–
IND total		5	24	0	.172		–	–	–	
Total		5	24	0	.172					
