= 1996 South Carolina Gamecocks football team =

American college football season

1996 South Carolina Gamecocks football
- Conference: Southeastern Conference
- Eastern Division
- Record: 6–5 (4–4 SEC)
- Head coach: Brad Scott (3rd season)
- Offensive coordinator: John Eason (2nd season)
- Defensive coordinator: Wally Burnham (3rd season)
- Home stadium: Williams–Brice Stadium

1996 Southeastern Conference football standings
| | Conf. | | | Overall |
| Team | W | | L | W | | L |
|---|---|---|---|---|---|---|
Eastern Division
| No. 1 Florida x$ | 8 | – | 0 | 12 | – | 1 |
| No. 9 Tennessee | 7 | – | 1 | 10 | – | 2 |
| South Carolina | 4 | – | 4 | 6 | – | 5 |
| Kentucky | 3 | – | 5 | 4 | – | 7 |
| Georgia | 3 | – | 5 | 5 | – | 6 |
| Vanderbilt | 0 | – | 8 | 2 | – | 9 |
Western Division
| No. 11 Alabama xy | 6 | – | 2 | 10 | – | 3 |
| No. 12 LSU x | 6 | – | 2 | 10 | – | 2 |
| No. 24 Auburn | 4 | – | 4 | 8 | – | 4 |
| Mississippi State | 3 | – | 5 | 5 | – | 6 |
| Ole Miss | 2 | – | 6 | 5 | – | 6 |
| Arkansas | 2 | – | 6 | 4 | – | 7 |
Championship: Florida 45, Alabama 30
$ – Conference champion; x – Division champion/co-champions; y – Championship game participant; Rankings from AP Poll

The 1996 South Carolina Gamecocks football team represented the University of South Carolina as a member of the Eastern Division of the Southeastern Conference (SEC) during the 1996 NCAA Division I-A football season. Led by third-year head coach Brad Scott, the Gamecocks compiled an overall record of 6–5 with a mark of 4–4 in conference play, placing third in the SEC's Eastern Division. The team played home games at Williams–Brice Stadium in Columbia, South Carolina.

South Carolina's season was highlighted by an upset over win over rival No. 22 Clemson on the road in the season finale. It was the Gamecocks' third victory against the Tigers in five years. Running back Duce Staley had the fourth highest single-season rushing total in program history to that point.

== Schedule ==
| Date | Time | Opponent | Site | TV | Result | Attendance | Source |
|---|---|---|---|---|---|---|---|
| September 7 | 7:00 p.m. | UCF* | Williams–Brice Stadium; Columbia, SC | | W 33–14 | 76,411 | |
| September 14 | 7:45 p.m. | Georgia | Williams–Brice Stadium; Columbia, SC (rivalry) | ESPN | W 23–14 | 82,950 | |
| September 21 | 7:00 p.m. | East Carolina* | Williams–Brice Stadium; Columbia, SC | | L 7–23 | 79,806 | |
| September 28 | 12:30 p.m. | Mississippi State | Williams–Brice Stadium; Columbia, SC | JPS | L 10–14 | 75,014 | |
| October 5 | 3:30 p.m. | at No. 20 Auburn | Jordan–Hare Stadium; Auburn, AL | CBS | L 24–28 | 84,107 | |
| October 12 | 7:00 p.m. | at Kentucky | Commonwealth Stadium; Lexington, KY | | W 25–14 | 50,500 | |
| October 19 | 1:00 p.m. | Arkansas^{†} | Williams–Brice Stadium; Columbia, SC | | W 23–17 | 79,419 | |
| October 26 | 2:00 p.m. | at Vanderbilt | Vanderbilt Stadium; Nashville, TN | PPV | W 27–0 | 36,583 | |
| November 2 | 12:30 p.m. | No. 6 Tennessee | Williams–Brice Stadium; Columbia, SC (rivalry) | JPS | L 14–31 | 82,808 | |
| November 16 | 7:45 p.m. | at No. 1 Florida | Ben Hill Griffin Stadium; Gainesville, FL | ESPN | L 25–52 | 85,701 | |
| November 23 | 5:30 p.m. | at No. 22 Clemson* | Memorial Stadium; Clemson, SC (rivalry) | ESPN2 | W 34–31 | 82,929 | |
*Non-conference game; ^{†}Homecoming; Rankings from AP Poll released prior to the game; All times are in Eastern time

== Roster ==
1996 South Carolina Gamecocks football team roster
Players
Coaches
Offense

| Pos. | # | Name | Class |
|---|---|---|---|
| WR | 21 | Zola Davis | So |
| WR | 81 | Ben Fleming | Fr |
| QB | 16 | Joey Unitas | So |
| RB | 22 | Duce Staley | Sr |
| WR | | Jon-Eric Sullivan |
| QB | 1 | Anthony Wright | So |

Defense

| Pos. | # | Name | Class |
|---|---|---|---|
| DL | 95 | John Abraham | Fr |
| DB | 28 | Chris Abrams | Sr |
| LB | 58 | Corey Atkins | Fr |
| LB | 52 | Shane Burnham | Jr |
| LB | 45 | James McDougald | Jr |
| DE | 89 | Maynard Caldwell | Sr |
| DB | 5 | Terry Cousin | Sr |
| DB | 12 | Arthuro Freeman | So |
| LB | 18 | Darren Hambrick | Jr |
| LB | 92 | Ryan Koop | Jr |

Special teams

| Pos. | # | Name | Class |
|---|---|---|---|
| PK | 14 | Reed Morton | Sr |

Head coach

- Brad Scott

Coordinators/assistant coaches

Legend

- (C) Team captain
- (S) Suspended
- (I) Ineligible
- Injured
- Redshirt

Roster
