= 1996 Ole Miss Rebels football team =

American college football season

1996 Ole Miss Rebels football
- Conference: Southeastern Conference
- Western Division
- Record: 5–6 (2–6 SEC)
- Head coach: Tommy Tuberville (2nd season)
- Offensive coordinator: Noel Mazzone (2nd season)
- Offensive scheme: Pro-style
- Defensive coordinator: Art Kaufman (2nd season)
- Base defense: 4–3
- Home stadium: Vaught–Hemingway Stadium; Mississippi Veterans Memorial Stadium; Liberty Bowl Memorial Stadium

1996 Southeastern Conference football standings
	Conf.			Overall
Team	W		L	W		L
Eastern Division
No. 1 Florida x$	8	–	0	12	–	1
No. 9 Tennessee	7	–	1	10	–	2
South Carolina	4	–	4	6	–	5
Kentucky	3	–	5	4	–	7
Georgia	3	–	5	5	–	6
Vanderbilt	0	–	8	2	–	9
Western Division
No. 11 Alabama xy	6	–	2	10	–	3
No. 12 LSU x	6	–	2	10	–	2
No. 24 Auburn	4	–	4	8	–	4
Mississippi State	3	–	5	5	–	6
Ole Miss	2	–	6	5	–	6
Arkansas	2	–	6	4	–	7
Championship: Florida 45, Alabama 30
$ – Conference champion; x – Division champion/co-champions; y – Championship game participant; Rankings from AP Poll

The 1996 Ole Miss Rebels football team represented the University of Mississippi during the 1996 NCAA Division I-A football season. They participated as members of the Southeastern Conference in the West Division. Coached by Tommy Tuberville, the Rebels played most of their home games at Vaught–Hemingway Stadium in Oxford, Mississippi as well their final "home game" versus Tennessee at the Liberty Bowl in Memphis and their final game ever at Mississippi Veterans Memorial Stadium in Jackson, Mississippi.

The 1996 Rebels served the second of a two-year postseason bowl ban, part of the sanctions handed down by the NCAA in November 1994. Ole Miss was allowed to appear on television after a ban on Ole Miss appearing on television was bestowed by the NCAA in 1995.

== Schedule ==
Date	Time	Opponent	Site	TV	Result	Attendance	Source
August 31	7:00 p.m.	No. 17 (I-AA) Idaho State*	Vaught–Hemingway Stadium; Oxford, MS		W 38–14	28,140	
September 7	7:00 p.m.	VMI*	Mississippi Veterans Memorial Stadium; Jackson, MS		W 31–7	28,196	
September 14	11:30 a.m.	No. 15 Auburn	Vaught–Hemingway Stadium; Oxford, MS (rivalry)	ESPN2	L 28–45	40,458	
September 21	6:00 p.m.	at Vanderbilt	Vanderbilt Stadium; Nashville, TN (rivalry)		W 20–9	40,820	
October 3	6:30 p.m.	vs. No. 8 Tennessee	Liberty Bowl Memorial Stadium; Memphis, TN (rivalry)	ESPN	L 3–41	62,640	
October 19	5:00 p.m.	at No. 7 Alabama	Bryant–Denny Stadium; Tuscaloosa, AL (rivalry)	ESPN2	L 0–37	70,123	
October 26	6:00 p.m.	Arkansas State*^{†}	Vaught–Hemingway Stadium; Oxford, MS		W 38–21	28,176	
November 9	1:00 p.m.	at Arkansas	Razorback Stadium; Fayetteville, AR (rivalry)		L 7–13	42,356	
November 16	2:00 p.m.	No. 17 LSU	Vaught–Hemingway Stadium; Oxford, MS (rivalry)		L 7–39	44,436	
November 23	11:30 a.m.	at Georgia	Sanford Stadium; Athens, GA	JPS	W 31–27	76,511	
November 30	11:30 a.m.	Mississippi State	Vaught–Hemingway Stadium; Oxford, MS (Egg Bowl)	ESPN2	L 0–17	23,678	
*Non-conference game; ^{†}Homecoming; Rankings from AP Poll released prior to the game; All times are in Central time
