= 1996 Vanderbilt Commodores football team =

American college football season

1996 Vanderbilt Commodores football
- Conference: Southeastern Conference
- Record: 2–9 (0–8 SEC)
- Head coach: Rod Dowhower (2nd season)
- Defensive coordinator: Woody Widenhofer (2nd season)
- Home stadium: Vanderbilt Stadium

1996 Southeastern Conference football standings
	Conf.			Overall
Team	W		L	W		L
Eastern Division
No. 1 Florida x$	8	–	0	12	–	1
No. 9 Tennessee	7	–	1	10	–	2
South Carolina	4	–	4	6	–	5
Kentucky	3	–	5	4	–	7
Georgia	3	–	5	5	–	6
Vanderbilt	0	–	8	2	–	9
Western Division
No. 11 Alabama xy	6	–	2	10	–	3
No. 12 LSU x	6	–	2	10	–	2
No. 24 Auburn	4	–	4	8	–	4
Mississippi State	3	–	5	5	–	6
Ole Miss	2	–	6	5	–	6
Arkansas	2	–	6	4	–	7
Championship: Florida 45, Alabama 30
$ – Conference champion; x – Division champion/co-champions; y – Championship game participant; Rankings from AP Poll

The 1996 Vanderbilt Commodores football team represented Vanderbilt University as a member of the Eastern Division of the Southeastern Conference (SEC) during the 1996 NCAA Division I-A football season. Led by Rod Dowhower in his second and final season as head coach, the Commodores compiled an overall record of 2–9 with a mark of 0–8 in conference play, placing last out of six teams in the SEC's Eastern Division. The team played home games at Vanderbilt Stadium in Nashville, Tennessee.

== Schedule ==
Date	Time	Opponent	Site	TV	Result	Attendance	Source
September 5	7:00 p.m.	No. 6 Notre Dame*	Vanderbilt Stadium; Nashville, TN	ESPN	L 7–14	41,523	
September 14	5:00 p.m.	at No. 13 Alabama	Bryant–Denny Stadium; Tuscaloosa, AL	ESPN2	L 26–36	70,123	
September 21	6:00 p.m.	Ole Miss	Vanderbilt Stadium; Nashville, TN (rivalry)		L 9–20	40,820	
October 5	7:00 p.m.	at No. 14 LSU	Tiger Stadium; Baton Rouge, LA		L 0–35	80,142	
October 12	2:30 p.m.	at North Texas*	Fouts Field; Denton, TX		W 19–7	16,227	
October 19	11:30 a.m.	at Georgia	Sanford Stadium; Athens, GA (rivalry)	JPS	L 2–13	80,757	
October 26	1:00 p.m.	South Carolina	Vanderbilt Stadium; Nashville, TN	PPV	L 0–27	36,583	
November 2	1:00 p.m.	UAB*	Vanderbilt Stadium; Nashville, TN		W 31–15	30,153	
November 9	11:30 a.m.	No. 1 Florida	Vanderbilt Stadium; Nashville, TN	JPS	L 21–28	40,249	
November 16	11:30 a.m.	at Kentucky	Commonwealth Stadium; Lexington, KY (rivalry)	JPS	L 0–25	33,000	
November 30	6:00 p.m.	No. 9 Tennessee	Vanderbilt Stadium; Nashville, TN (rivalry)	ESPN	L 7–14	40,289	
*Non-conference game; Rankings from AP Poll released prior to the game; All times are in Central time

== Roster ==
1996 Vanderbilt Commodores football team roster
Players
Coaches
Offense

Pos.	#	Name	Class
QB	17	Damian Allen	Jr
C	51	Jim Anguiano	So
OT	75	Allen DeGraffenreid	Sr
RB	35	Marcus A. Williams	Jr
RB	23	Tyrone Yarbrough	So
WR	81	Todd Yoder	Fr

Defense

Pos.	#	Name	Class
CB	30	Damien Charley	So
CB	4	Corey Chavous	Jr
LB	49	Jamie Duncan	Jr
LB	34	Carlton Hall	Jr
SS	19	Eric Vance	Sr

Special teams

Pos.	#	Name	Class

Head coach

- Rod Dowhower

Coordinators/assistant coaches

Legend

- (C) Team captain
- (S) Suspended
- (I) Ineligible
- Injured
- Redshirt

Roster
Last update: 1997-01-10
