= 1996 Peach Bowl =

American college football game

- 29th Peach Bowl
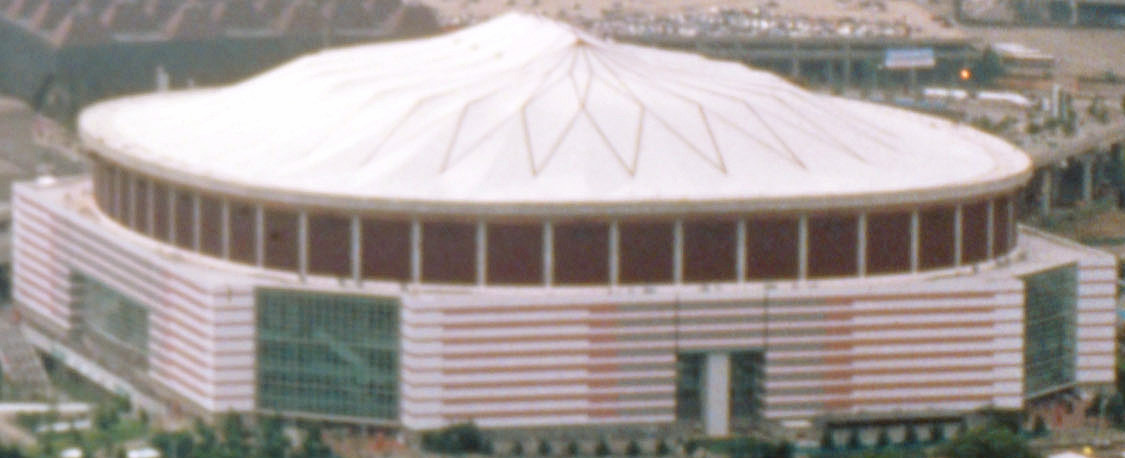
- The Georgia Dome in Atlanta, Georgia, hosted the Peach Bowl.
| Clemson Tigers | LSU Tigers |
| (7–4) | (9–2) |
| ACC | SEC |
| 7 | 10 |
| Head coach: Tommy West | Head coach: Gerry DiNardo |
| | AP / Coaches / BA; 17 / 16 / 16 |
| | 1 | 2 | 3 | 4 | Total |
|---|---|---|---|---|---|
| Clemson | 7 | 0 | 0 | 0 | 7 |
| LSU | 0 | 10 | 0 | 0 | 10 |
- Date: December 28, 1996
- Season: 1996
- Stadium: Georgia Dome
- Location: Atlanta, Georgia
- MVP: Herb Tyler, LSU
- Referee: Steve Usechek (Big 12)
- Attendance: 63,622

United States TV coverage
- Network: ESPN
- Announcers: Dave Barnett and Todd Christensen

The 1996 Peach Bowl featured the Clemson Tigers and LSU Tigers.

LSU scored the final 10 points of the game after Clemson took an early 7–0 lead. After an LSU turnover in the first quarter, Clemson quarterback Nealon Greene ran for a five-yard touchdown. LSU subsequently went on an 80-yard drive capped by Kevin Faulk's three-yard touchdown run. Wade Richey kicked a field goal late in the second quarter for LSU. Neither team was able to score in the second half.
