= 1996 Georgia Bulldogs football team =

American college football season

1996 Georgia Bulldogs football
- Conference: Southeastern Conference
- Eastern Division
- Record: 5–6 (3–5 SEC)
- Head coach: Jim Donnan (1st season)
- Offensive coordinator: Greg Briner (1st season)
- Offensive scheme: Pro-style
- Defensive coordinator: Joe Kines (2nd season)
- Base defense: 4–3
- Home stadium: Sanford Stadium

1996 Southeastern Conference football standings
	Conf.			Overall
Team	W		L	W		L
Eastern Division
No. 1 Florida x$	8	–	0	12	–	1
No. 9 Tennessee	7	–	1	10	–	2
South Carolina	4	–	4	6	–	5
Kentucky	3	–	5	4	–	7
Georgia	3	–	5	5	–	6
Vanderbilt	0	–	8	2	–	9
Western Division
No. 11 Alabama xy	6	–	2	10	–	3
No. 12 LSU x	6	–	2	10	–	2
No. 24 Auburn	4	–	4	8	–	4
Mississippi State	3	–	5	5	–	6
Ole Miss	2	–	6	5	–	6
Arkansas	2	–	6	4	–	7
Championship: Florida 45, Alabama 30
$ – Conference champion; x – Division champion/co-champions; y – Championship game participant; Rankings from AP Poll

The 1996 Georgia Bulldogs football team represented the University of Georgia as a member of the Eastern Division of the Southeastern Conference (SEC) during the 1996 NCAA Division I-A football season. Led by first-year head coach Jim Donnan, the Bulldogs compiled an overall record of 5–6, with a mark of 3–5 in conference play, and finished tied for fourth in the SEC Eastern Division.

As of 2026, this was the last time the Bulldogs did not qualify for a bowl game, and their last losing season until 2010.

== Schedule ==
Date	Time	Opponent	Site	TV	Result	Attendance	Source
August 31	4:00 p.m.	Southern Miss*	Sanford Stadium; Athens, GA	SS	L 7–11	81,067	
September 14	7:30 p.m.	at South Carolina	Williams–Brice Stadium; Columbia, SC (rivalry)	ESPN	L 14–23	82,950	
September 21	5:30 p.m.	Texas Tech*	Sanford Stadium; Athens, GA	ESPN2	W 15–12	73,116	
October 5	7:00 p.m.	at Mississippi State	Scott Field; Starkville, MS	ESPN2	W 38–19	32,247	
October 12	7:00 p.m.	No. 7 Tennessee	Sanford Stadium; Athens, GA (rivalry)	ESPN	L 17–29	86,117	
October 19	12:30 p.m.	Vanderbilt^{†}	Sanford Stadium; Athens, GA (rivalry)	JPS	W 13–2	80,757	
October 26	7:00 p.m.	at Kentucky	Commonwealth Stadium; Lexington, KY		L 17–24	34,000	
November 2	3:30 p.m.	vs. No. 1 Florida	Jacksonville Municipal Stadium; Jacksonville, FL (rivalry)	CBS	L 7–47	84,103	
November 16	3:30 p.m.	at No. 20 Auburn	Jordan-Hare Stadium; Auburn, AL (Deep South's Oldest Rivalry)	CBS	W 56–49 ^{4OT}	85,214	
November 23	12:30 p.m.	Ole Miss	Sanford Stadium; Athens, GA	JPS	L 27–31	76,511	
November 30	12:00 p.m.	Georgia Tech*	Sanford Stadium; Athens, GA (Clean, Old-Fashioned Hate)	CBS	W 19–10	78,062	
*Non-conference game; ^{†}Homecoming; Rankings from AP Poll released prior to the game; All times are in Eastern time

== Roster ==
1996 Georgia Bulldogs football team roster
Players
Coaches
Offense

Pos.	#	Name	Class
QB	14	Mike Bobo	Jr
OT	75	Jonas Jennings	Fr
WR	19	Hines Ward	Jr
OT	71	Adam Meadows	Sr

Defense

Pos.	#	Name	Class
FS	4	Kirby Smart	So
CB	42	Champ Bailey	Fr

Special teams

Pos.	#	Name	Class
K	41	Hap Hines	Fr

Head coach

- Jim Donnan

Coordinators/assistant coaches

Legend

- (C) Team captain
- (S) Suspended
- (I) Ineligible
- Injured
- Redshirt

Roster
