= Tommy West (American football) =

American football player and coach (born 1954)

Biographical details
- Born: July 31, 1954 (age 72); Carrollton, Georgia, U.S.

Playing career
- 1972–1975: Tennessee
- Position: Tight end

Coaching career (HC unless noted)
- 1979: Ole Miss (RB)
- 1980–1981: Appalachian State (WR/TE)
- 1982: Clemson (WR)
- 1983–1989: Clemson (LB)
- 1990: Tennessee (RB)
- 1991–1992: South Carolina (DC/LB)
- 1993: Chattanooga
- 1993–1998: Clemson
- 2000: Memphis (DC/LB)
- 2001–2009: Memphis
- 2011: UAB (DC/LB)
- 2012: Southern Miss (DC/LB)
- 2014–2023: Middle Tennessee (DL)

Head coaching record
- Overall: 84–96
- Bowls: 3–6

Accomplishments and honors

Awards
- Second-team All-SEC (1975)

Thomas Cleveland West (born July 31, 1954) is an American former college football player and coach. West served as head football coach at the University of Tennessee at Chattanooga (1993), Clemson University (1993–1998) and the University of Memphis (2001–2009), compiling a career head coaching record of 84–96. West was fired as head coach at Memphis on November 9, 2009 after beginning the season 2–7. West finished the season with Memphis. He was the defensive line coach at Middle Tennessee State University from 2014 to 2023.

West attended Gainesville High School in Gainesville, Georgia, from which he graduated in 1972. There he was a letterman in football, basketball, and baseball. In football, he was an All-American selection, and was also drafted in fifth round of the Major League Baseball Draft by the Chicago Cubs. He is married to the former Cyndie Smith of Germantown, Tennessee, and has one son, Turner West, who is an assistant at Buffalo Bills.

== Head coaching record ==
Year	Team	Overall	Conference	Standing	Bowl/playoffs	Coaches^{#}	AP^{°}
Chattanooga Mocs (Southern Conference) (1993)
1993	Chattanooga	4–7	2–6	5th			
Chattanooga:		4–7	2–6				
Clemson Tigers (Atlantic Coast Conference) (1993–1998)
1993	Clemson	1–0 (Note: Ken Hatfield resigned after the regular season. West coached Clemson in the Peach Bowl. Clemson credits the 1993 regular season to Hatfield and the Peach Bowl to West.)			W Peach	23	22
1994	Clemson	5–6	4–4	6th			
1995	Clemson	8–4	6–2	2nd	L Gator		
1996	Clemson	7–5	6–2	T–2nd	L Peach		
1997	Clemson	7–5	4–4	5th	L Peach		
1998	Clemson	3–8	1–7	T–9th			
Clemson:		31–28	21–19				
Memphis Tigers (Conference USA) (2001–2009)
2001	Memphis	5–6	3–4	7th			
2002	Memphis	3–9	2–6	9th			
2003	Memphis	9–4	5–3	T–3rd	W New Orleans		
2004	Memphis	8–4	5–3	T–2nd	L GMAC		
2005	Memphis	7–5	5–3	T–2nd (East)	W Motor City		
2006	Memphis	2–10	1–7	6th (East)			
2007	Memphis	7–6	6–2	T–2nd (East)	L New Orleans		
2008	Memphis	6–7	4–4	T–2nd (East)	L St. Petersburg		
2009	Memphis	2–10	1–7	6th (East)			
Memphis:		49–61	32–39				
Total:		84–96					
^{#}Rankings from final Coaches Poll.; ^{°}Rankings from final AP Poll.
