= Bill Elias Jr. =

American football coach

Bill Elias, Jr.
Biographical details
- Education: University of Massachusetts Amherst

Coaching career (HC unless noted)
- 1978–1980: Delaware (RB)
- 1981–1986: Eastern Michigan (GA/LB)
- 1987: Butler County (OC/OL)
- 1991–1993: Vanderbilt (OLB/DE)
- 1994–1997: LSU (RC)
- 1999–2006: Gannon
- 2009–2010: Miami (OH) (AHC/LB)
- 2016–2018: Texas Southern (AHC/LB/RC)

Administrative career (AD unless noted)
- 2006–2008: Gannon
- 2011–2015: Gannon (senior assoc. AD)

Head coaching record
- Overall: 31–51

Accomplishments and honors

Awards
- IFCA Coach of the Year (2003)

William T. Elias Jr. is an American former college football coach. He was the head football coach at Gannon University from 1999 to 2006, where he compiled a 31–51.

Elias served as the athletic director at Gannon for three years before taking his current position at Miami. A 1977 graduate of University of Massachusetts Amherst, he is the son of former Virginia and Navy head coach Bill Elias.

== Head coaching record ==
Year	Team	Overall	Conference	Standing	Bowl/playoffs
Gannon Golden Knights (NCAA Division II independent) (1999–2003)
1999	Gannon	1–9			
2000	Gannon	3–7			
2001	Gannon	5–4			
2002	Gannon	5–5			
2003	Gannon	9–1			
Gannon Golden Knights (Great Lakes Intercollegiate Athletic Conference) (2004–2006)
2004	Gannon	4–7	3–7	T–10th	
2005	Gannon	3–8	3–7	T–9th	
2006	Gannon	1–10	1–9	T–12th	
Gannon:		31–51	7–23		
Total:		31–51			
