= 1996 Mississippi State Bulldogs football team =

American college football season

1996 Mississippi State Bulldogs football
- Conference: Southeastern Conference
- Western Division
- Record: 5–6 (3–5 SEC)
- Head coach: Jackie Sherrill (6th season)
- Offensive coordinator: Lynn Amedee (1st season)
- Offensive scheme: Multiple
- Defensive coordinator: Joe Lee Dunn (1st season)
- Base defense: 3–3–5
- Home stadium: Scott Field

1996 Southeastern Conference football standings
	Conf.			Overall
Team	W		L	W		L
Eastern Division
No. 1 Florida x$	8	–	0	12	–	1
No. 9 Tennessee	7	–	1	10	–	2
South Carolina	4	–	4	6	–	5
Kentucky	3	–	5	4	–	7
Georgia	3	–	5	5	–	6
Vanderbilt	0	–	8	2	–	9
Western Division
No. 11 Alabama xy	6	–	2	10	–	3
No. 12 LSU x	6	–	2	10	–	2
No. 24 Auburn	4	–	4	8	–	4
Mississippi State	3	–	5	5	–	6
Ole Miss	2	–	6	5	–	6
Arkansas	2	–	6	4	–	7
Championship: Florida 45, Alabama 30
$ – Conference champion; x – Division champion/co-champions; y – Championship game participant; Rankings from AP Poll

The 1996 Mississippi State Bulldogs football team represented Mississippi State University as a member of the Western Division of the Southern Conference (SEC) during the 1996 NCAA Division I-A football season. Led by sixth-year head coach Jackie Sherrill, the Bulldogs compiled an overall record of 5–6 with a mark of 3–5 in conference play, placing fourth in the SEC's Western Division. Mississippi State played home games at Scott Field in Starkville, Mississippi.

On November 16, Mississippi State beat Alabama for the program's first win over the Crimson Tide since the 1980 season.

== Schedule ==
Date	Time	Opponent	Site	TV	Result	Attendance	Source
September 7	7:00 p.m.	at Memphis*	Liberty Bowl Memorial Stadium; Memphis, TN		W 31–10	38,388	
September 21	6:00 p.m.	Louisiana Tech*	Scott Field; Starkville, MS		L 23–38	33,194	
September 28	11:30 a.m.	at South Carolina	Williams–Brice Stadium; Columbia, SC	JPS	W 14–10	75,014	
October 5	6:00 p.m.	Georgia	Scott Field; Starkville, MS	ESPN2	L 19–38	32,247	
October 12	11:30 a.m.	No. 18 Auburn	Scott Field; Starkville, MS	JPS	L 15–49	40,728	
October 26	11:30 a.m.	at No. 13 LSU	Tiger Stadium; Baton Rouge, LA (rivalry)	JPS	L 20–28	79,594	
November 2	1:30 p.m.	Northeast Louisiana*^{†}	Scott Field; Starkville, MS		W 59–0	31,038	
November 9	12:30 p.m.	at Kentucky	Commonwealth Stadium; Lexington, KY		L 21–24	26,500	
November 16	8:00 p.m.	No. 8 Alabama	Scott Field; Starkville, MS (rivalry)	ESPN	W 17–16	40,050	
November 23	1:30 p.m.	Arkansas	Scott Field; Starkville, MS		L 13–16 ^{OT}	30,103	
November 30	11:30 a.m.	at Ole Miss	Vaught–Hemingway Stadium; Oxford, MS (Egg Bowl)	ESPN2	W 17–0	23,678	
*Non-conference game; ^{†}Homecoming; Rankings from AP Poll released prior to the game; All times are in Central time

== Roster ==
1996 Mississippi State Bulldogs football team roster
Players
Coaches
Offense

Pos.	#	Name	Class
G	59	Brad Ainsworth	Sr
C	53	Eric Allen	So
WR	19	Lorenzo Armstead	Fr
G	60	Burt Ashley	Jr

Defense

Pos.	#	Name	Class
DE	94	Terry Day	Sr

Special teams

Pos.	#	Name	Class

Head coach

- Jackie Sherrill

Coordinators/assistant coaches

Legend

- (C) Team captain
- (S) Suspended
- (I) Ineligible
- Injured
- Redshirt

Roster
Last update: 1996-12-25
