= 1996 Tennessee Volunteers football team =

American college football season

1996 Tennessee Volunteers football

Florida Citrus Bowl champion

Florida Citrus Bowl, W 48–28 vs. Northwestern
- Conference: Southeastern Conference
- Eastern Division

Ranking
- Coaches: No. 9
- AP: No. 9
- Record: 10–2 (7–1 SEC)
- Head coach: Phillip Fulmer (4th season)
- Offensive coordinator: David Cutcliffe (4th season)
- Offensive scheme: Pro-style
- Defensive coordinator: John Chavis (2nd season)
- Base defense: Multiple 4–3
- Captains: Raymond Austin; Jay Graham
- Home stadium: Neyland Stadium

1996 Southeastern Conference football standings
	Conf.			Overall
Team	W		L	W		L
Eastern Division
No. 1 Florida x$	8	–	0	12	–	1
No. 9 Tennessee	7	–	1	10	–	2
South Carolina	4	–	4	6	–	5
Kentucky	3	–	5	4	–	7
Georgia	3	–	5	5	–	6
Vanderbilt	0	–	8	2	–	9
Western Division
No. 11 Alabama xy	6	–	2	10	–	3
No. 12 LSU x	6	–	2	10	–	2
No. 24 Auburn	4	–	4	8	–	4
Mississippi State	3	–	5	5	–	6
Ole Miss	2	–	6	5	–	6
Arkansas	2	–	6	4	–	7
Championship: Florida 45, Alabama 30
$ – Conference champion; x – Division champion/co-champions; y – Championship game participant; Rankings from AP Poll

The 1996 Tennessee Volunteers football team represented the University of Tennessee as a member of the Eastern Division of the Southeastern Conference (SEC) during the 1996 NCAA Division I-A football season. Led by fourth-year head coach Phillip Fulmer, the Volunteers compiled an overall record of 10–2 with a mark of 7–1, placing second in the SEC's Eastern Division. Tennessee was invited to the Florida Citrus Bowl, where the Volunteers defeated Northwestern. The team played home games at Neyland Stadium in Knoxville, Tennessee.

Tennessee had lost to in-state rival Memphis for the first time ever. The Volunteers offense scored 437 points while the defense allowed only 185 points.

== Schedule ==
Date	Time	Opponent	Rank	Site	TV	Result	Attendance	Source
August 31	7:00 p.m.	UNLV*	No. 2	Neyland Stadium; Knoxville, TN	PPV	W 62–3	106,212	
September 7	3:30 p.m.	UCLA*	No. 2	Neyland Stadium; Knoxville, TN	CBS	W 35–20	106,297	
September 21	3:30 p.m.	No. 4 Florida	No. 2	Neyland Stadium; Knoxville, TN (rivalry, College GameDay)	CBS	L 29–35	107,608	
October 3	7:30 p.m.	vs. Ole Miss	No. 9	Liberty Bowl Memorial Stadium; Memphis, TN	ESPN	W 41–3	62,640	
October 12	7:00 p.m.	at Georgia	No. 7	Sanford Stadium; Athens, GA (rivalry)	ESPN	W 29–17	86,117	
October 26	3:30 p.m.	No. 7 Alabama	No. 6	Neyland Stadium; Knoxville, TN (Third Saturday in October)	CBS	W 20–13	106,700	
November 2	12:30 p.m.	at South Carolina	No. 6	Williams–Brice Stadium; Columbia, SC	JPS	W 31–14	82,808	
November 9	3:30 p.m.	at Memphis*	No. 6	Liberty Bowl Memorial Stadium; Memphis, TN	CBS	L 17–21	65,685	
November 16	12:30 p.m.	Arkansas	No. 12	Neyland Stadium; Knoxville, TN	JPS	W 55–14	103,158	
November 23	3:30 p.m.	Kentucky	No. 9	Neyland Stadium; Knoxville, TN (rivalry)	CBS	W 56–10	102,534	
November 30	7:00 p.m.	at Vanderbilt	No. 9	Vanderbilt Stadium; Nashville, TN (rivalry)	ESPN	W 14–7	40,289	
January 1	1:00 p.m.	vs. No. 11 Northwestern*	No. 9	Citrus Bowl; Orlando, FL (Florida Citrus Bowl)	ABC	W 48–28	63,467	
*Non-conference game; Rankings from AP Poll released prior to the game; All times are in Eastern time

== Rankings ==
Ranking movements Legend: ██ Increase in ranking ██ Decrease in ranking ( ) = First-place votes
	Week																	
Poll	Pre	1	2	3	4	5	6	7	8	9	10	11	12	13	14	15	16	Final
AP	2 (7)	2 (8)	2 (8)	2 (4)	2 (5)	9	9	7	6	6	6	6	12	9	9	9	9	9
Coaches	2 (6)		2 (4)	2 (1)	2 (2)	8	9	7	6	7	6	6	12	10	10	10	10	9

== Roster ==
1996 Tennessee Volunteers football team roster
Players
Coaches
Offense

Pos.	#	Name	Class
RB	25	Jay Graham	Sr
WR	83	Tyrone Graham	Fr
WR	11	Joey Kent	Sr
QB	16	Peyton Manning	Jr
QB	17	Tee Martin	Fr
WR	88	Andy McCullough	Jr
TE	86	Dustin Moore	Sr
WR	12	Marcus Nash	Jr
QB	10	Jason Price	Sr
WR	37	Peerless Price	So
WR	81	Benjie Shuler	Jr
C	70	Trey Teague	Jr

Defense

Pos.	#	Name	Class
LB	99	Eric Brown	Jr
DE	91	Jonathan Brown	Jr
DT	50	Bill Duff	Jr
DE	93	Shaun Ellis	Fr
DB	13	Terry Fair	Jr
S	30	Cory Gaines	Jr
S	9	Tori Noel	Jr
LB	27	Al Wilson	So

Special teams

Pos.	#	Name	Class

Head coach

- Phillip Fulmer

Coordinators/assistant coaches

- David Cutcliffe – Offensive coordinator/assistant head coach/quarterbacks
- Randy Sanders – Running backs/recruiting coordinator
- Pat Washington – Wide receivers
- Rodney Garner – Tight ends
- Mark Bradley – Offensive line
- John Chavis – Defensive coordinator/linebackers
- Dan Brooks – Defensive line
- Kevin Ramsey – Defensive backs
- Steve Caldwell – Special teams/defensive ends

Legend

- (C) Team captain
- (S) Suspended
- (I) Ineligible
- Injured
- Redshirt

Roster

== Team players drafted into the NFL ==
Tennessee had three players selected in the 1997 NFL Draft.

Player	Position	Round	Pick	NFL club
Joey Kent	Wide receiver	2	46	Tennessee Oilers
Jay Graham	Running back	3	64	Baltimore Ravens
Ray Austin	Cornerback	5	145	New York Jets
