= 1996 SEC Championship Game =

- Conference Championship
- 1996 SEC Championship logo
Alabama Crimson Tide	Florida Gators
(9–2)	(10–1)
30	45
Head coach: Gene Stallings	Head coach: Steve Spurrier
AP / Coaches; 11 / 11	AP / Coaches; 4 / 4
	1	2	3	4	Total
Alabama	7	7	14	2	30
Florida	6	18	14	7	45
- Date: December 7, 1996
- Season: 1996
- Stadium: Georgia Dome
- Location: Atlanta, Georgia
- MVP: QB Danny Wuerffel, Florida
- Favorite: Florida by 14½
- Referee: Aster Sizemore
- Attendance: 74,132

United States TV coverage
- Network: ABC
- Nielsen ratings: 7.0

1996 Southeastern Conference football standings
	Conf.			Overall
Team	W		L	W		L
Eastern Division
No. 1 Florida x$	8	–	0	12	–	1
No. 9 Tennessee	7	–	1	10	–	2
South Carolina	4	–	4	6	–	5
Kentucky	3	–	5	4	–	7
Georgia	3	–	5	5	–	6
Vanderbilt	0	–	8	2	–	9
Western Division
No. 11 Alabama xy	6	–	2	10	–	3
No. 12 LSU x	6	–	2	10	–	2
No. 24 Auburn	4	–	4	8	–	4
Mississippi State	3	–	5	5	–	6
Ole Miss	2	–	6	5	–	6
Arkansas	2	–	6	4	–	7
Championship: Florida 45, Alabama 30
$ – Conference champion; x – Division champion/co-champions; y – Championship game participant; Rankings from AP Poll

The 1996 SEC Championship Game was won by the Florida Gators 45–30 over the Alabama Crimson Tide. The game was played in the Georgia Dome in Atlanta, on December 7, 1996, and was televised to a national audience on ABC.
