= Van Hiles =

American football player (born 1975)

No. 48
- Position: Defensive back

Personal information
- Born: November 1, 1975 (age 51); Baton Rouge, Louisiana, U.S.
- Listed height: 6 ft 0 in (1.83 m)
- Listed weight: 195 lb (88 kg)

Career information
- High school: Episcopal (Baton Rouge)
- College: Kentucky
- NFL draft: 1997: 5th round, 141st overall pick

Career history
- Chicago Bears (1997); St. Louis Rams (1999)*
- * Offseason or practice squad member only

Career NFL statistics
- Tackles: 1
- Stats at Pro Football Reference

Van Hiles (born November 1, 1975) is an American former professional football player who was a defensive back for the Chicago Bears of the National Football League (NFL) in 1997. He played college football for the Kentucky Wildcats and was selected in the fifth round of the 1997 NFL draft.
