= Rick Smith (American football, born 1948) =

American football coach

Biographical details
- Born: March 13, 1948 (age 78); Tallahassee, Florida, U.S.
- Education: Florida State

Coaching career (HC unless noted)
- 1971–1973: Amos P. Godby HS (FL) (assistant)
- 1975–1976: Wakulla HS (FL)
- 1979–1981: East Tennessee State (DB)
- 1982: Marianna HS (FL)
- 1983–1985: Georgia Tech (LB)
- 1986: Alabama (DB)
- 1987–1989: Baylor (DB)
- 1990–1995: Kentucky (DB)
- 1996: Kentucky (DC/DB)
- 1997–1998: Tulane (DC)
- 1999–2000: Cincinnati (DC)
- 2001: Kentucky (AHC/DB/RC)
- 2002–2003: Louisiana Tech (co-DC/DB)
- 2004: Berlin Thunder (DB)
- 2005–2006: East Carolina (DB)
- 2007–2009: East Carolina (AHC/DB)
- 2010–2012: South Florida (AHC/DB)
- 2013–2015: East Carolina (DC/DB)
- 2016: East Carolina (DB)

Richard David Smith (born March 13, 1948) is a former American college football coach. He was formerly the defensive coordinator and secondary coach at East Carolina University (ECU), a position he held until December 2016 when he retired after 36 years as a coach.

== Early life and education ==
Smith is a graduate of Florida State University.

== Coaching career ==
Smith coached the Georgia Tech Yellow Jackets football team as head coach of the junior varsity team in 1977, then joined the staff at East Tennessee State University for the 1978 season before becoming a high school head coach. He then returned to Georgia Tech as linebackers coach in 1982 and as secondary and punters coach in 1983–1985. In 1986, Smith was the defensive backs coach for the University of Alabama and he held the same position at Baylor University from 1987 through 1989.

From 1990 through 1995, Smith was the defensive backs coach at the University of Kentucky and became defensive coordinator there in 1996 under head coach Bill Curry. From 1997 through 1998, he was the defensive coordinator for Tulane University, which went undefeated in 1998. Smith then became defensive coordinator at the University of Cincinnati in 1999 and 2000, before returning to Kentucky as defensive backs coach in 2001.

Smith then was the co-defensive coordinator at Louisiana Tech University in 2002 and 2003. He spent one year as the defensive backs coach for the Berlin Thunder of the NFL Europe in 2004; the Thunder won the World Bowl that season. Smith became the defensive secondary coach for East Carolina University in 2005 and followed head coach Skip Holtz to the University of South Florida in 2010.
