= Ray Austin (American football) =

American football player (born 1974)

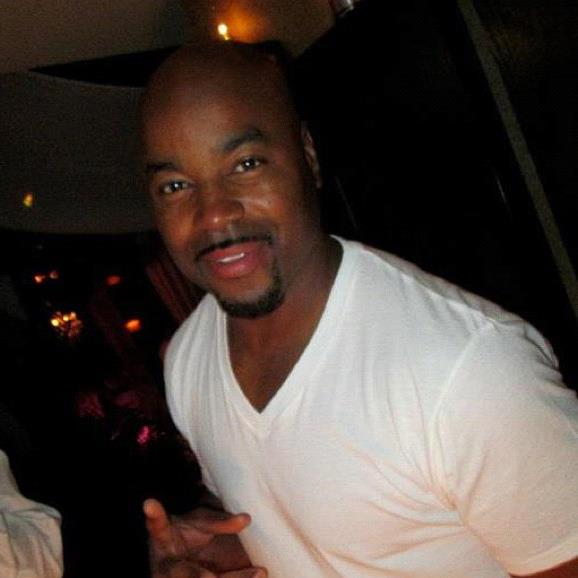
- Austin at the "100 Days Of Summer" premiere

No. 36
- Position: Safety

Personal information
- Born: December 21, 1974 (age 51); Greensboro, North Carolina, U.S.
- Listed height: 6 ft 1 in (1.85 m)
- Listed weight: 190 lb (86 kg)

Career information
- High school: Eisenhower (Lawton, Oklahoma)
- College: Tennessee
- NFL draft: 1997: 5th round, 145th overall pick

Career history
- New York Jets (1997); Chicago Bears (1998–1999); Chicago Enforcers (2001)

Career NFL statistics
- Tackles: 28
- Stats at Pro Football Reference

Raymond Demont Austin (born December 21, 1974) is an American former professional football player who was a safety in the National Football League (NFL). He played college football for the Tennessee Volunteers and was selected by the New York Jets in the fifth round of the 1997 NFL draft. He also played for the Chicago Bears in the NFL and the Chicago Enforcers of the XFL. In 2017, he started the Fan Controlled Sports League and is currently the league commissioner.

Besides his association with sports, he has been acting since 2005 with roles on Prison Break, Detroit 1-8-7, Chicago Fire, Chicago P.D. and Empire.

== Fan Controlled Sports & Entertainment ==
In 2017, Austin became one of the founders of Fan Controlled Football (FCF). FCF raised $3m from angels investors, $12m in a pre-seed, and $40m in a Series A in 2020 with Lightspeed Ventures leading the seed round, Animoca Brands and Delphi Digital leading the Series A. The league had its first season in 2021 with 4 teams playing 12 games each. In 2022, the league grew to 8 teams and announced a new broadcast deal with NBCUniversal subsidiary NBCLX and Peacock to broadcast every game of the 2022 season.

Austin currently serves as the FCF league commissioner.

== ATHLYT ==
Austin is a co-founder and Chief Brand Officer of ATHLYT, a startup looking to connect college athletes with advertisers. In 2022 the NCAA began allowing student athletes to profit from their name, image and, likeness (NIL) which allowed companies like ATHLYT to start helping college student athletes to start earning from their NIL.

== Filmography ==
| Year | Film | Role |
|---|---|---|
| 2005 | The Trouble with Dee Dee | Reggie Bailey |
| 2006 | Prison Break | Sally Port C.O. |
| 2009 | The Beast | Agent #1 / #3 / Agent |
| 2010 | Polish Bar | Rooney |
| 2010 | Detroit 1-8-7 | Dutch |
| 2011 | The Chicago Code | Beat Copper #2 |
| 2012 | Boss | Protest Sheriff |
| 2014 | Sirens | Wedding Guest #3 |
| 2014 | 100 Days of Summer | Self |
| 2012–2017 | Chicago Fire | Officer Hiller |
| 2016–2020 | Chicago P.D. | Officer Hiller / Joe Mason / Uni |
| 2016–2020 | Empire | John Holloway |
| 2021 | The Big Leap | Treyson |

== Career statistics ==
=== College ===
| Year | Team | Games | | Tackles | | | | Interceptions | | | | | | Fumbles | |
| Year | Team | GP | GS | Cmb | Solo | Ast | Sck | PD | Int | Yds | Avg | Lng | TD | FF | FR |
|---|---|---|---|---|---|---|---|---|---|---|---|---|---|---|---|
| 1993 | TEN | 11 | | | | | | | 1 | 4 | 4.0 | | 0 | | |
| 1995 | TEN | 11 | | | | | | | 3 | 5 | 1.7 | | 0 | | |
| 1996 | TEN | 11 | | | | | | | 4 | 54 | 13.5 | | 0 | | |
| Career | | 33 | | | | | | | 8 | 63 | 7.9 | | 0 | | |

=== NFL ===
| Year | Team | Games | | Tackles | | | | Interceptions | | | | | | Fumbles | |
| Year | Team | GP | GS | Cmb | Solo | Ast | Sck | PD | Int | Yds | Avg | Lng | TD | FF | FR |
|---|---|---|---|---|---|---|---|---|---|---|---|---|---|---|---|
| 1997 | NYJ | 16 | 0 | 12 | 8 | 4 | 0.0 | 0 | 0 | 0 | 0 | 0 | 0 | 0 | 0 |
| 1998 | CHI | 12 | 0 | 5 | 2 | 3 | 0.0 | 0 | 0 | 0 | 0 | 0 | 0 | 0 | 0 |
| 1999 | CHI | 15 | 0 | 11 | 7 | 4 | 0.0 | 0 | 0 | 0 | 0.0 | 0 | 0 | 0 | 0 |
| Career | | 43 | 0 | 28 | 17 | 11 | 0.0 | 0 | 0 | 0 | 0 | 0 | 0 | 0 | 0 |
