= 1997 Florida Citrus Bowl =

American college football game

1997 CompUSA Florida Citrus Bowl
Tennessee Volunteers	Northwestern Wildcats
(9–2)	(9–2)
SEC	Big Ten
48	28
Head coach: Phillip Fulmer	Head coach: Gary Barnett
AP / Coaches / BA; 9 / 10 / 10	AP / Coaches / BA; 11 / 11 / 11
	1	2	3	4	Total
Tennessee	21	10	7	10	48
Northwestern	0	21	0	7	28
- Date: January 1, 1997
- Season: 1996
- Stadium: Florida Citrus Bowl
- Location: Orlando, Florida
- Referee: Bill McCabe (WAC)
- Attendance: 63,467

United States TV coverage
- Network: ABC
- Announcers: Mark Jones, John Spagnola, and Dean Blevins

The 1997 Florida Citrus Bowl was a college football bowl game played on January 1, 1997, at the Florida Citrus Bowl in Orlando, Florida. The game featured the Northwestern Wildcats and the Tennessee Volunteers.

== Background ==
This was the Volunteers' fourth appearance in the Citrus Bowl and third in four seasons. Once again, they had finished second in the Eastern Division in the Southeastern Conference (SEC). This was Northwestern's second consecutive bowl game appearance after winning their second straight Big Ten Conference title. This was the Wildcats' first appearance in the Citrus Bowl.

== Game summary ==
Peyton Manning gave the Vols an early 21–0 lead with two touchdown passes and a touchdown run. But Northwestern responded with three touchdowns of their own, two of them from Darnell Autry on a run and a Steve Schnur touchdown pass to Brian Musso. But Manning threw another touchdown pass and Jeff Hall added in a field goal before time expired to give the Vols a 31–21 halftime lead. Tyrone Hines increased the lead when he intercepted a Schnur pass and returned it for a touchdown. After a Hall field goal, Schnur threw another touchdown pass to narrow the lead to 41–28. But Manning threw his fourth touchdown pass of day, this time to Dustin Moore, to seal the game for the Volunteers. Manning went 27 of 39 passes for 408 yards while Schnur went 25 for 45 for 228 yards but threw three interceptions.

- Tennessee – P. Price 43-yard touchdown pass from Manning (Hall kick)
- Tennessee – Manning 10-yard touchdown run (Hall kick)
- Tennessee – Kent 11-yard touchdown pass from Manning (Hall kick)
- Northwestern – D. Autry 2-yard touchdown run (Gowins kick)
- Northwestern – Musso 20-yard touchdown pass from Schnur (Gowins kick)
- Northwestern – D. Autry 28-yard touchdown run (Gowins kick)
- Tennessee – Kent 67-yard touchdown pass from Manning (Hall kick)
- Tennessee – Hall 19-yard field goal
- Tennessee – Hines 30-yard interception run (Hall kick)
- Tennessee – Hall 28-yard field goal
- Northwestern – Bates 22-yard touchdown pass from Schnur (Gowins kick)
- Tennessee – Moore 6-yard touchdown pass from Manning (Hall kick)

== Aftermath ==
Tennessee reached the Citrus Bowl four years later. Fulmer coached at Tennessee until 2008.

Barnett coach two more seasons for the Wildcats before resigning . Northwestern did not win their next bowl game until 2013.

== Statistics ==
Statistics	UT	NWU
First downs	29	22
Yards rushing	115	43
Yards passing	408	242
Total yards	523	285
Punts-Average	4–35.8	6–37.3
Fumbles-Lost	4–2	1–1
Interceptions	0	3
Penalties-Yards	13–112	5–40
