= Billy Jack Haskins =

American football player

No. 7
- Position: Quarterback

Career information
- College: Kentucky (1993–1996)

Billy Jack Haskins is an American former football quarterback for the University of Kentucky from 1993 through 1996.

Haskins won the Kentucky "Mr. Football" Award as a senior at Paducah Tilghman High School in 1992. At graduation, he had passed for more yardage than any player in Kentucky high school history.

At Kentucky during his sophomore year Haskins beat out incumbent starter Jeff Speedy during the 1995 season, starting the final nine of Kentucky's eleven games. That year, he completed 60.4% of his passes (a school record at the time) for 1,176 yards and four touchdowns. His 47-yard touchdown run against Tennessee in which he broke several tackles gave Kentucky a 31–27 lead and won multiple "Play of the Year" awards.

During the 1996 season, Haskins began splitting playing time with highly regarded freshman Tim Couch.

After the 1996 season Kentucky head coach Bill Curry was fired and replaced by Hal Mumme. Mumme installed a pass-oriented offense and announced that Couch would be the starting quarterback. Haskins transferred to the University of Rhode Island to finish his playing career.

== After football ==
As of 2019, Haskins has worked as an investment advisor in Alabama for 15 years. He is married and has 2 children.

| Preceded by Scott Russell | Kentucky "Mr. Football" Award Winner; 1992 | Succeeded by Jeremy Simpson |
