= 1996 Auburn Tigers football team =

American college football season

1996 Auburn Tigers football

Independence Bowl champion

Independence Bowl, W 32–29 vs. Army
- Conference: Southeastern Conference
- Western Division

Ranking
- Coaches: No. 25
- AP: No. 24
- Record: 8–4 (4–4 SEC)
- Head coach: Terry Bowden (4th season)
- Offensive coordinator: Tommy Bowden (6th season); Rodney Allison (bowl game)
- Defensive coordinator: Bill Oliver (1st season)
- Home stadium: Jordan–Hare Stadium

1996 Southeastern Conference football standings
	Conf.			Overall
Team	W		L	W		L
Eastern Division
No. 1 Florida x$	8	–	0	12	–	1
No. 9 Tennessee	7	–	1	10	–	2
South Carolina	4	–	4	6	–	5
Kentucky	3	–	5	4	–	7
Georgia	3	–	5	5	–	6
Vanderbilt	0	–	8	2	–	9
Western Division
No. 11 Alabama xy	6	–	2	10	–	3
No. 12 LSU x	6	–	2	10	–	2
No. 24 Auburn	4	–	4	8	–	4
Mississippi State	3	–	5	5	–	6
Ole Miss	2	–	6	5	–	6
Arkansas	2	–	6	4	–	7
Championship: Florida 45, Alabama 30
$ – Conference champion; x – Division champion/co-champions; y – Championship game participant; Rankings from AP Poll

The 1996 Auburn Tigers football team represented Auburn University in the 1996 NCAA Division I-A football season. Coached by Terry Bowden, they tallied an 8–4 record, played Army in the Independence Bowl, and finished the season ranked #22 in the AP Poll and #21 in the Coaches Poll.

== Schedule ==
Date	Time	Opponent	Rank	Site	TV	Result	Attendance	Source
August 31	5:30 p.m.	UAB*	No. 16	Jordan-Hare Stadium; Auburn, AL		W 29–0	80,645	
September 7	6:00 p.m.	Fresno State*	No. 18	Jordan-Hare Stadium; Auburn, AL	PPV	W 62–0	79,026	
September 14	11:30 a.m.	at Ole Miss	No. 15	Vaught–Hemingway Stadium; Oxford, MS (rivalry)	ESPN2	W 45–28	40,456	
September 21	6:30 p.m.	No. 21 LSU	No. 13	Jordan-Hare Stadium; Auburn, AL (rivalry)	ESPN	L 15–19	85,214	
October 5	2:30 p.m.	South Carolina	No. 20	Jordan-Hare Stadium; Auburn, AL	CBS	W 28–24	84,107	
October 12	11:30 a.m.	at Mississippi State	No. 18	Scott Field; Starkville, MS	JPS	W 49–15	40,728	
October 19	2:30 p.m.	at No. 1 Florida	No. 16	Ben Hill Griffin Stadium; Gainesville, FL (rivalry)	CBS	L 10–51	85,697	
November 2	6:00 p.m.	Arkansas	No. 24	Jordan-Hare Stadium; Auburn, AL	ESPN2	W 28–7	84,763	
November 9	1:00 p.m.	Northeast Louisiana*^{†}	No. 22	Jordan-Hare Stadium; Auburn, AL		W 28–24	78,309	
November 16	2:30 p.m.	Georgia	No. 20	Jordan-Hare Stadium; Auburn, AL (Deep South's Oldest Rivalry)	CBS	L 49–56 ^{4OT}	85,214	
November 23	6:30 p.m.	at No. 15 Alabama		Legion Field; Birmingham, AL (Iron Bowl, College GameDay)	ESPN	L 23–24	83,091	
December 31	2:30 p.m.	vs. No. 24 Army*		Independence Stadium; Shreveport, LA (Independence Bowl)	ESPN	W 32–29	41,366	
*Non-conference game; ^{†}Homecoming; Rankings from AP Poll released prior to the game; All times are in Central time

== Rankings ==
Ranking movements Legend: ██ Increase in ranking ██ Decrease in ranking — = Not ranked т = Tied with team above or below
	Week																	
Poll	Pre	1	2	3	4	5	6	7	8	9	10	11	12	13	14	15	16	Final
AP	17	16	18	15	13т	22	20	18	16	22	24	22	20	—	—	—	—	24
Coaches	17		17	16	15	22	20	19	16	—	25	24	21	—	—	—	—	25

== Roster ==
1996 Auburn Tigers football team roster
Players
Coaches
Offense

Pos.	#	Name	Class
WR	5	Karsten Bailey	So
WR		Robert Baker
QB	16	Dameyune Craig	Jr
OT	69	DeMarcus Curry	So
WR	83	Tyrone Goodson
QB	13	Todd Huerkamp	Fr
OT	78	Jeno James
C	52	James Kiger
TE	80	Jessie McCovery
FB	43	Kevin McLeod	Jr
G	68	Victor Riley	Jr
OT	73	Jim Roe
G	60	Leonard Thomas
RB	3	Rusty Williams

Defense

Pos.	#	Name	Class
CB	4	Jayson Bray
NT	96	Jimmy Brumbaugh
DE	91	Charles Dorsey
DE	95	Leonardo Carson
CB	9	Dan Evans	So
S	25	Martavius Houston
OLB	47	Marcellus Mostella
ILB	50	Ricky Neal
OLB	86	Quinton Reese
ILB	55	Takeo Spikes	So
S	27	Brad Ware
LB	82	Marcus Washington	Fr

Special teams

Pos.	#	Name	Class
K, P	19	Jaret Holmes	Jr

Head coach

- Terry Bowden

Coordinators/assistant coaches

- Tommy Bowden – Offensive coordinator
- Jimbo Fisher – Quarterbacks
- Joe Hortiz – Graduate assistant

Legend

- (C) Team captain
- (S) Suspended
- (I) Ineligible
- Injured
- Redshirt

Roster
Last update: 1996-12-21
