= Jay Graham =

American football player and coach (born 1975)

Personal information
- Born: July 14, 1975 (age 51); Concord, North Carolina, U.S.
- Listed height: 5 ft 11 in (1.80 m)
- Listed weight: 215 lb (98 kg)

Career information
- High school: Concord
- College: Tennessee
- NFL draft: 1997: 3rd round, 64th overall pick

Career history

Playing
- Baltimore Ravens (1997–1999); Seattle Seahawks (2001); Green Bay Packers (2002); Montreal Alouettes (2003)

Coaching
- Tennessee (2005) Graduate assistant; Chattanooga (2006) Running backs coach; UT Martin (2007) Running backs coach & recruiting coordinator; Miami (OH) (2008) Running backs coach; South Carolina (2009–2010) Running backs coach; South Carolina (2011) Running backs & tight ends coach; Tennessee (2012) Running backs coach; Florida State (2013) Running backs coach; Florida State (2014–2017) Running backs coach & special teams coach; Texas A&M (2018–2019) Running backs coach; Tennessee (2020) Running backs coach; Alabama (2021) Special teams coordinator & tight ends coach; East Tennessee State (2021) Special teams coordinator & offensive line quality control; East Tennessee State (2024) Special teams coordinator & tight ends coach

Awards and highlights
- As coach: BCS national champion (2013)

Career NFL statistics
- Rushing yards: 454
- Yards per carry: 3.5
- Rushing touchdowns: 2
- Receptions: 20
- Receiving yards: 104
- Stats at Pro Football Reference

Herman Jason "Jay" Graham (born July 14, 1975) is an American football coach and former running back who is formerly the special teams coordinator and tight ends coach at the University of Alabama.

== Playing career ==
Playing for Concord High School from 1990–92, Graham was a nationally recruited running back who broke school records in single-season and career rushing in his two and one half seasons with the Spiders. Named All-State and All-American, Graham signed a football scholarship with the University of Tennessee in 1992.

Graham rushed for 2,609 yards in his career (1993–96), ranking sixth on the Vols all-time rushing list. He is second on the all-time carries list with 540 and he scored 25 touchdowns in his four-year career as a Volunteer. Graham had season best totals in 1995 when he rushed for 1,438 yards on 272 carries putting him second in both categories in Vols school history. He tallied a career-best 211 yards against Vanderbilt. He also holds the single-season record for the most 100-yard rushing games with 10.

Graham was selected in the third round of the 1997 NFL draft. During his professional career he played for the Baltimore Ravens 1997-99, the Seattle Seahawks in 2001, and the Green Bay Packers for the 2002 season. He also played in the Canadian Football League (CFL)'s Montreal Alouettes during the 2003 season.

== Coaching career ==
Graham returned to his alma mater for the 2005 season as a Graduate Assistant before moving on to the UT-Chattanooga where he spent the 2006 season as their Running Backs coach. He moved again the next off season, this time to UT-Martin where he was the RB coach and Recruiting Coordinator. He changed locations again prior to the 2008 season when he became the RB coach for the Miami RedHawks. For the 2009 season he accepted a position with the South Carolina Gamecocks as the RB coach. After three seasons at South Carolina, he was named the new RB coach for the Volunteers, again returning to his alma mater. In February 2013, he left Tennessee to accept a similar position with the Florida State Seminoles. After the 2019 season he joined head coach Jeremy Pruitt and became the running backs coach at University of Tennessee.

Graham was hired as the special teams coordinator and tight ends coach at Alabama in 2021.

On March 24, 2021, Graham resigned and left Alabama after only two months with the program

Following his resignation at Alabama, Graham was hired as special teams and offensive line quality control coach at East Tennessee State in 2021. He rejoined East Tennessee State in 2024. He left to become the head coach at Centennial High School in Franklin, Tennessee in 2025.

== Prostitution Sting ==
In October 2025, Graham was placed under arrest during a prostitution sting for patronizing prostitution with a minor as well as solicitation of a minor for aggravated statutory rape. After ads were posted on adult escort websites, Graham engaged with the ads and began communication with an officer posing as a 16-year-old. After booking a hotel room and paying the officer $120, Graham was immediately taken into custody.
