= 1996–97 NCAA football bowl games =

College football postseason game series

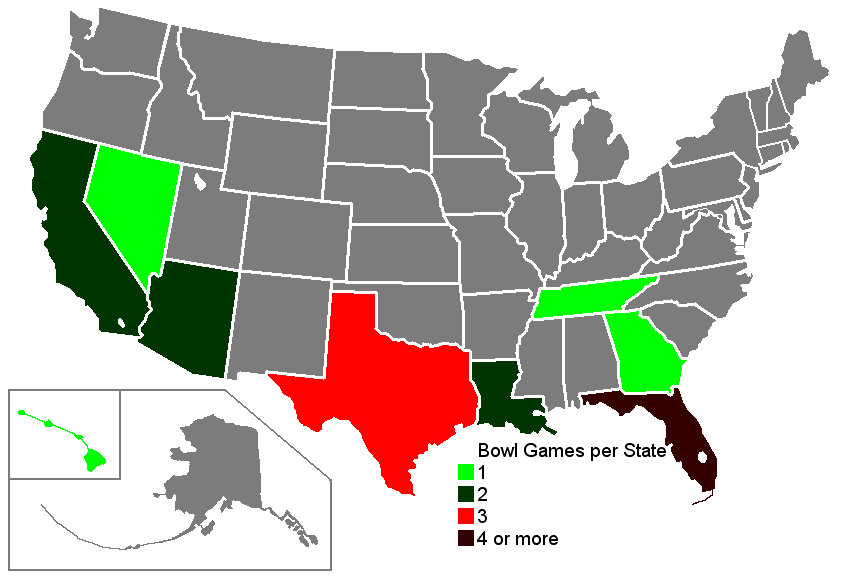
- Number of bowl games per state.
- Season: 1996
- Regular season: August 24–December 7
- Number of bowls: 18
- Bowl games: December 19, 1996 – January 2, 1997
- National Championship: 1997 Sugar Bowl
- Location of Championship: Louisiana Superdome, New Orleans, Louisiana
- Champions: Florida Gators
Bowl record by conference
Conference	Bowls	Record	Final AP poll
Big Ten	7	4–3 (0.571)	5
SEC	5	5–0 (1.000)	5
Big 12	5	2–3 (0.400)	4
Big East	4	2–2 (0.500)	3
ACC	4	1–3 (0.250)	2
Pac-10	4	1–3 (0.250)	2
Independents	2	1–1 (0.500)	2
WAC	2	1–1 (0.500)	2
Big West	1	1–0 (1.000)	0
Conference USA	1	0–1 (0.000)	0
MAC	1	0–1 (0.000)	0

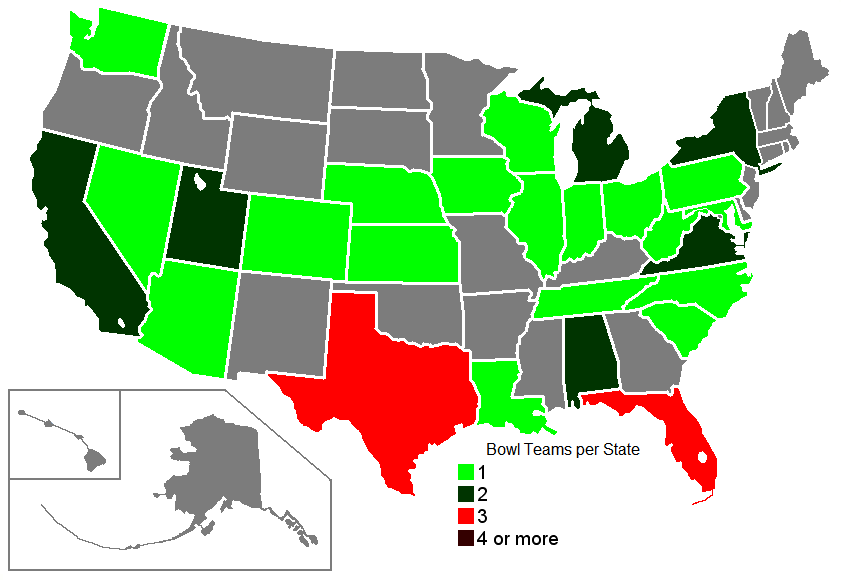
Number of bowl teams per state.

The 1996-97 NCAA College Football Bowl Games post-season schedule followed the 1996 NCAA Division I-A regular football season in college football and contained 18 bowl games. This started with the 4th annual Las Vegas Bowl and ended with the 1997 Sugar Bowl. The Sugar Bowl served as the Bowl Alliance national championship game for the 1996 season and occurred in the Louisiana Superdome in New Orleans. Featuring a rematch between the #1 Florida State Seminoles and the #3 Florida Gators, the Gators reversed the outcome of their regular season game with the Seminoles to capture both the AP and Bowl Alliance championships.

== Non-Bowl Alliance bowls ==
Date	Game	Site	Result	Ref.
Dec 19	1996 Las Vegas Bowl	Sam Boyd Stadium; Las Vegas, NV	Nevada 18, Ball State 15	
Dec 25	1996 Aloha Bowl	Aloha Stadium; Honolulu, HI	Navy 42, Cal 38	
Dec 27	1996 Carquest Bowl	Pro Player Stadium; Miami Gardens, FL	(19) Miami 31, Virginia 21	
Dec 27	1996 Liberty Bowl	Liberty Bowl Memorial Stadium; Memphis, TN	(23) Syracuse 30, Houston 17	
Dec 27	1996 Copper Bowl	Arizona Stadium; Tucson, AZ	Wisconsin 38, Utah 10	
Dec 28	1996 Peach Bowl	Georgia Dome; Atlanta, GA	(17) LSU 10, Clemson 7	
Dec 29	1996 Alamo Bowl	Alamodome; San Antonio, TX	(21) Iowa 27, Texas Tech 0	
Dec 30	1996 Holiday Bowl	Jack Murphy Stadium; San Diego, CA	(8) Colorado 33, (13) Washington 21	
Dec 31	1996 Independence Bowl	Independence Stadium; Shreveport, LA	Auburn 32, (24) Army 29	
Dec 31	1996 Sun Bowl	Sun Bowl; El Paso, TX	Stanford 38, Michigan State 0	
Jan 1	1997 Outback Bowl	Houlihan's Stadium; Tampa, FL	(16) Alabama 17, (15) Michigan 14	
Jan 1	1997 Cotton Bowl Classic	Cotton Bowl; Dallas, TX	(5) BYU 19, (14) Kansas State 15	
Jan 1	1997 Gator Bowl	Alltel Stadium; Jacksonville, FL	(12) North Carolina 20, (25) West Virginia 13	
Jan 1	1997 Rose Bowl	Rose Bowl; Pasadena, CA	(4) Ohio State 20, (2) Arizona State 17	
Jan 1	1997 Florida Citrus Bowl	Florida Citrus Bowl; Orlando, FL	(9) Tennessee 48, (11) Northwestern 28	
Rankings from AP Poll released prior to the game.

== Bowl Alliance games ==
Date	Game	Site	Result	Ref.
Dec 31	1996 Orange Bowl	Pro Player Stadium; Miami Gardens, FL	(6) Nebraska 41, (10) Virginia Tech 21	
Jan 1	1997 Fiesta Bowl	Sun Devil Stadium; Tempe, AZ	(7) Penn State 38, (20) Texas 15	
Jan 2	1997 Sugar Bowl (championship game)	Louisiana Superdome; New Orleans, LA	(3) Florida 52, (1) Florida State 20	
Rankings from AP Poll released prior to the game.

== Final rankings ==
=== AP Poll ===
1. Florida
2. Ohio State
3. Florida State
4. Arizona State
5. BYU
6. Nebraska
7. Penn State
8. Colorado
9. Tennessee
10. North Carolina
11. Alabama
12. LSU
13. Virginia Tech
14. Miami (FL)
15. Northwestern
16. Washington
17. Kansas State
18. Iowa
19. Notre Dame
20. Michigan
21. Syracuse
22. Wyoming
23. Texas
24. Auburn
25. Army

=== Coaches' Poll ===
1. Florida
2. Ohio State
3. Florida State
4. Arizona State
5. BYU
6. Nebraska
7. Penn State
8. Colorado
9. Tennessee
10. North Carolina
11. Alabama
12. Virginia Tech
13. LSU
14. Miami (FL)
15. Washington
16. Northwestern
17. Kansas State
18. Iowa
19. Syracuse
20. Michigan
21. Notre Dame
22. Wyoming
23. Texas
24. Auburn
25. Army
