= List of Big East Conference (1979–2013) football standings =

This is a list of yearly Big East Conference (1979–2013) football standings. The conference first began football play in 1991.

== Big East standings ==
1991 Big East Conference football standings
| | Conf. | | | | | Overall |
| Team | W | | L | | T | W | | L | | T |
|---|---|---|---|---|---|---|---|---|---|---|
| No. 11 Syracuse | 5 | – | 0 | – | 0 | 10 | – | 2 | – | 0 |
| No. 1 Miami (FL) | 2 | – | 0 | – | 0 | 12 | – | 0 | – | 0 |
| Virginia Tech | 1 | – | 0 | – | 0 | 5 | – | 6 | – | 0 |
| Pittsburgh | 3 | – | 2 | – | 0 | 6 | – | 5 | – | 0 |
| West Virginia | 3 | – | 4 | – | 0 | 6 | – | 5 | – | 0 |
| Rutgers | 2 | – | 3 | – | 0 | 6 | – | 5 | – | 0 |
| Boston College | 2 | – | 4 | – | 0 | 4 | – | 7 | – | 0 |
| Temple | 0 | – | 5 | – | 0 | 2 | – | 9 | – | 0 |
The Big East did not crown an official champion until 1993 when full league play began.; Rankings from AP Poll

1992 Big East Conference football standings
| | Conf. | | | | | Overall |
| Team | W | | L | | T | W | | L | | T |
|---|---|---|---|---|---|---|---|---|---|---|
| No. 3 Miami (FL) | 4 | – | 0 | – | 0 | 11 | – | 1 | – | 0 |
| No. 6 Syracuse | 6 | – | 1 | – | 0 | 10 | – | 2 | – | 0 |
| Rutgers | 4 | – | 2 | – | 0 | 7 | – | 4 | – | 0 |
| No. 21 Boston College | 2 | – | 1 | – | 1 | 8 | – | 3 | – | 1 |
| West Virginia | 2 | – | 3 | – | 1 | 5 | – | 4 | – | 2 |
| Pittsburgh | 1 | – | 3 | – | 0 | 3 | – | 9 | – | 0 |
| Virginia Tech | 1 | – | 4 | – | 0 | 2 | – | 8 | – | 1 |
| Temple | 0 | – | 6 | – | 0 | 1 | – | 10 | – | 0 |
The Big East did not crown an official champion until 1993 when full league play began.; Rankings from AP Poll

1993 Big East Conference football standings
| | Conf. | | | | | Overall |
| Team | W | | L | | T | W | | L | | T |
|---|---|---|---|---|---|---|---|---|---|---|
| No. 7 West Virginia $ | 7 | – | 0 | – | 0 | 11 | – | 1 | – | 0 |
| No. 15 Miami (FL) | 6 | – | 1 | – | 0 | 9 | – | 3 | – | 0 |
| No. 13 Boston College | 5 | – | 2 | – | 0 | 9 | – | 3 | – | 0 |
| No. 22 Virginia Tech | 4 | – | 3 | – | 0 | 9 | – | 3 | – | 0 |
| Syracuse | 3 | – | 4 | – | 0 | 6 | – | 4 | – | 1 |
| Pittsburgh | 2 | – | 5 | – | 0 | 3 | – | 8 | – | 0 |
| Rutgers | 1 | – | 6 | – | 0 | 4 | – | 7 | – | 0 |
| Temple | 0 | – | 7 | – | 0 | 1 | – | 10 | – | 0 |
$ – Conference champion; Rankings from AP Poll

1994 Big East Conference football standings
| | Conf. | | | | | Overall |
| Team | W | | L | | T | W | | L | | T |
|---|---|---|---|---|---|---|---|---|---|---|
| No. 6 Miami (FL) $ | 7 | – | 0 | – | 0 | 10 | – | 2 | – | 0 |
| Virginia Tech | 5 | – | 2 | – | 0 | 8 | – | 4 | – | 0 |
| Syracuse | 4 | – | 3 | – | 0 | 7 | – | 4 | – | 0 |
| West Virginia | 4 | – | 3 | – | 0 | 7 | – | 6 | – | 0 |
| No. 23 Boston College | 3 | – | 3 | – | 1 | 7 | – | 4 | – | 1 |
| Rutgers | 2 | – | 4 | – | 1 | 5 | – | 5 | – | 1 |
| Pittsburgh | 2 | – | 5 | – | 0 | 3 | – | 8 | – | 0 |
| Temple | 0 | – | 7 | – | 0 | 2 | – | 9 | – | 0 |
$ – Conference champion; Rankings from AP Poll

1995 Big East Conference football standings
| | Conf. | | | Overall |
| Team | W | | L | W | | L |
|---|---|---|---|---|---|---|
| No. 10 Virginia Tech + | 6 | – | 1 | 10 | – | 2 |
| No. 20 Miami (FL) + | 6 | – | 1 | 8 | – | 3 |
| No. 19 Syracuse | 5 | – | 2 | 9 | – | 3 |
| West Virginia | 4 | – | 3 | 5 | – | 6 |
| Boston College | 4 | – | 3 | 4 | – | 8 |
| Rutgers | 2 | – | 5 | 4 | – | 7 |
| Temple | 1 | – | 6 | 1 | – | 10 |
| Pittsburgh | 0 | – | 7 | 2 | – | 9 |
+ – Conference co-champions; Rankings from AP Poll

1996 Big East Conference football standings
| | Conf. | | | Overall |
| Team | W | | L | W | | L |
|---|---|---|---|---|---|---|
| No. 13 Virginia Tech + | 6 | – | 1 | 10 | – | 2 |
| No. 14 Miami (FL) + | 6 | – | 1 | 9 | – | 3 |
| No. 21 Syracuse + | 6 | – | 1 | 9 | – | 3 |
| West Virginia | 4 | – | 3 | 8 | – | 4 |
| Pittsburgh | 3 | – | 4 | 4 | – | 7 |
| Boston College | 2 | – | 5 | 5 | – | 7 |
| Rutgers | 1 | – | 6 | 2 | – | 9 |
| Temple | 0 | – | 7 | 1 | – | 10 |
+ – Conference co-champions; Rankings from AP Poll

1997 Big East Conference football standings
| | Conf. | | | Overall |
| Team | W | | L | W | | L |
|---|---|---|---|---|---|---|
| No. 21 Syracuse $ | 6 | – | 1 | 9 | – | 4 |
| No. 23 Virginia Tech | 5 | – | 2 | 7 | – | 5 |
| Pittsburgh | 4 | – | 3 | 6 | – | 6 |
| West Virginia | 4 | – | 3 | 7 | – | 5 |
| Miami (FL) | 3 | – | 4 | 5 | – | 6 |
| Temple | 3 | – | 4 | 3 | – | 8 |
| Boston College | 3 | – | 4 | 4 | – | 7 |
| Rutgers | 0 | – | 7 | 0 | – | 11 |
$ – Conference champion; Rankings from AP Poll

1998 Big East Conference football standings
| | Conf. | | | Overall |
| Team | W | | L | W | | L |
|---|---|---|---|---|---|---|
| No. 25 Syracuse $ | 6 | – | 1 | 8 | – | 4 |
| No. 20 Miami (FL) | 5 | – | 2 | 9 | – | 3 |
| No. 23 Virginia Tech | 5 | – | 2 | 9 | – | 3 |
| West Virginia | 5 | – | 2 | 8 | – | 4 |
| Boston College | 3 | – | 4 | 4 | – | 7 |
| Rutgers | 2 | – | 5 | 5 | – | 6 |
| Temple | 2 | – | 5 | 2 | – | 9 |
| Pittsburgh | 0 | – | 7 | 2 | – | 9 |
$ – BCS representative as conference champion; Rankings from AP Poll

1999 Big East Conference football standings
| | Conf. | | | Overall |
| Team | W | | L | W | | L |
|---|---|---|---|---|---|---|
| No. 2 Virginia Tech $ | 7 | – | 0 | 11 | – | 1 |
| No. 15 Miami (FL) | 6 | – | 1 | 9 | – | 4 |
| Boston College | 4 | – | 3 | 8 | – | 4 |
| Syracuse | 3 | – | 4 | 7 | – | 5 |
| West Virginia | 3 | – | 4 | 4 | – | 7 |
| Pittsburgh | 2 | – | 5 | 5 | – | 6 |
| Temple | 2 | – | 5 | 2 | – | 9 |
| Rutgers | 1 | – | 6 | 1 | – | 10 |
$ – BCS representative as conference champion; Rankings from AP Poll

2000 Big East Conference football standings
| | Conf. | | | Overall |
| Team | W | | L | W | | L |
|---|---|---|---|---|---|---|
| No. 2 Miami (FL) $ | 7 | – | 0 | 11 | – | 1 |
| No. 6 Virginia Tech | 6 | – | 1 | 11 | – | 1 |
| Pittsburgh | 4 | – | 3 | 7 | – | 5 |
| Syracuse | 4 | – | 3 | 6 | – | 5 |
| Boston College | 3 | – | 4 | 7 | – | 5 |
| West Virginia | 3 | – | 4 | 7 | – | 5 |
| Temple | 1 | – | 6 | 4 | – | 7 |
| Rutgers | 0 | – | 7 | 3 | – | 8 |
$ – BCS representative as conference champion; Rankings from AP Poll

2001 Big East Conference football standings
| | Conf. | | | Overall |
| Team | W | | L | W | | L |
|---|---|---|---|---|---|---|
| No. 1 Miami (FL) $# | 7 | – | 0 | 12 | – | 0 |
| No. 14 Syracuse | 6 | – | 1 | 10 | – | 3 |
| No. 18 Virginia Tech | 4 | – | 3 | 8 | – | 4 |
| No. 21 Boston College | 4 | – | 3 | 8 | – | 4 |
| Pittsburgh | 4 | – | 3 | 7 | – | 5 |
| Temple | 2 | – | 5 | 4 | – | 7 |
| West Virginia | 1 | – | 6 | 3 | – | 8 |
| Rutgers | 0 | – | 7 | 2 | – | 9 |
# – BCS National Champion; $ – BCS representative as conference champion; Rankings from AP Poll

2002 Big East Conference football standings
| | Conf. | | | Overall |
| Team | W | | L | W | | L |
|---|---|---|---|---|---|---|
| No. 2 Miami (FL) $ | 7 | – | 0 | 12 | – | 1 |
| No. 25 West Virginia | 6 | – | 1 | 9 | – | 4 |
| No. 19 Pittsburgh | 5 | – | 2 | 9 | – | 4 |
| No. 18 Virginia Tech | 3 | – | 4 | 10 | – | 4 |
| Boston College | 3 | – | 4 | 9 | – | 4 |
| Temple | 2 | – | 5 | 4 | – | 8 |
| Syracuse | 2 | – | 5 | 4 | – | 8 |
| Rutgers | 0 | – | 7 | 1 | – | 11 |
$ – BCS representative as conference champion; Rankings from AP Poll

2003 Big East Conference football standings
| | Conf. | | | Overall |
| Team | W | | L | W | | L |
|---|---|---|---|---|---|---|
| No. 5 Miami (FL) $+ | 6 | – | 1 | 11 | – | 2 |
| West Virginia + | 6 | – | 1 | 8 | – | 5 |
| Pittsburgh | 5 | – | 2 | 8 | – | 5 |
| Virginia Tech | 4 | – | 3 | 8 | – | 5 |
| Boston College | 3 | – | 4 | 8 | – | 5 |
| Syracuse | 2 | – | 5 | 6 | – | 6 |
| Rutgers | 2 | – | 5 | 5 | – | 7 |
| Temple | 0 | – | 7 | 1 | – | 11 |
$ – BCS representative as conference champion; + – Conference co-champions; Rankings from AP Poll

2004 Big East Conference football standings
| | Conf. | | | Overall |
| Team | W | | L | W | | L |
|---|---|---|---|---|---|---|
| No. 25 Pittsburgh $+ | 4 | – | 2 | 8 | – | 4 |
| No. 21 Boston College + | 4 | – | 2 | 9 | – | 3 |
| West Virginia + | 4 | – | 2 | 8 | – | 4 |
| Syracuse + | 4 | – | 2 | 6 | – | 6 |
| Connecticut | 3 | – | 3 | 8 | – | 4 |
| Rutgers | 1 | – | 5 | 4 | – | 7 |
| Temple | 1 | – | 5 | 2 | – | 9 |
$ – BCS representative as conference champion; + – Conference co-champions; Rankings from AP Poll

2005 Big East Conference football standings
| | Conf. | | | Overall |
| Team | W | | L | W | | L |
|---|---|---|---|---|---|---|
| No. 5 West Virginia $ | 7 | – | 0 | 11 | – | 1 |
| No. 19 Louisville | 5 | – | 2 | 9 | – | 3 |
| Rutgers | 4 | – | 3 | 7 | – | 5 |
| South Florida | 4 | – | 3 | 6 | – | 6 |
| Pittsburgh | 4 | – | 3 | 5 | – | 6 |
| Connecticut | 2 | – | 5 | 5 | – | 6 |
| Cincinnati | 2 | – | 5 | 4 | – | 7 |
| Syracuse | 0 | – | 7 | 1 | – | 10 |
$ – BCS representative as conference champion; Rankings from AP Poll

2006 Big East Conference football standings
| | Conf. | | | Overall |
| Team | W | | L | W | | L |
|---|---|---|---|---|---|---|
| No. 6 Louisville $ | 6 | – | 1 | 12 | – | 1 |
| No. 10 West Virginia | 5 | – | 2 | 11 | – | 2 |
| No. 12 Rutgers | 5 | – | 2 | 11 | – | 2 |
| South Florida | 4 | – | 3 | 9 | – | 4 |
| Cincinnati | 4 | – | 3 | 8 | – | 5 |
| Pittsburgh | 2 | – | 5 | 6 | – | 6 |
| Connecticut | 1 | – | 6 | 4 | – | 8 |
| Syracuse | 1 | – | 6 | 4 | – | 8 |
$ – BCS representative as conference champion; Rankings from AP Poll

2007 Big East Conference football standings
| | Conf. | | | Overall |
| Team | W | | L | W | | L |
|---|---|---|---|---|---|---|
| No. 6 West Virginia $+ | 5 | – | 2 | 11 | – | 2 |
| Connecticut + | 5 | – | 2 | 9 | – | 4 |
| No. 17 Cincinnati | 4 | – | 3 | 10 | – | 3 |
| South Florida | 4 | – | 3 | 9 | – | 4 |
| Rutgers | 3 | – | 4 | 8 | – | 5 |
| Louisville | 3 | – | 4 | 6 | – | 6 |
| Pittsburgh | 3 | – | 4 | 5 | – | 7 |
| Syracuse | 1 | – | 6 | 2 | – | 10 |
$ – BCS representative as conference champion; + – Conference co-champions; Rankings from AP Poll

2008 Big East Conference football standings
| | Conf. | | | Overall |
| Team | W | | L | W | | L |
|---|---|---|---|---|---|---|
| No. 17 Cincinnati $ | 6 | – | 1 | 11 | – | 3 |
| Pittsburgh | 5 | – | 2 | 9 | – | 4 |
| No. 23 West Virginia | 5 | – | 2 | 9 | – | 4 |
| Rutgers | 5 | – | 2 | 8 | – | 5 |
| Connecticut | 3 | – | 4 | 8 | – | 5 |
| South Florida | 2 | – | 5 | 8 | – | 5 |
| Louisville | 1 | – | 6 | 5 | – | 7 |
| Syracuse | 1 | – | 6 | 3 | – | 9 |
$ – BCS representative as conference champion; Rankings from AP Poll

2009 Big East Conference football standings
| | Conf. | | | Overall |
| Team | W | | L | W | | L |
|---|---|---|---|---|---|---|
| No. 8 Cincinnati $ | 7 | – | 0 | 12 | – | 1 |
| No. 25 West Virginia | 5 | – | 2 | 9 | – | 4 |
| No. 15 Pittsburgh | 5 | – | 2 | 10 | – | 3 |
| Rutgers | 3 | – | 4 | 9 | – | 4 |
| Connecticut | 3 | – | 4 | 8 | – | 5 |
| South Florida | 3 | – | 4 | 8 | – | 5 |
| Louisville | 1 | – | 6 | 4 | – | 8 |
| Syracuse | 1 | – | 6 | 4 | – | 8 |
$ – BCS representative as conference champion; Rankings from AP Poll

2010 Big East Conference football standings
| | Conf. | | | Overall |
| Team | W | | L | W | | L |
|---|---|---|---|---|---|---|
| Connecticut $+ | 5 | – | 2 | 8 | – | 5 |
| West Virginia + | 5 | – | 2 | 9 | – | 4 |
| Pittsburgh + | 5 | – | 2 | 8 | – | 5 |
| Syracuse | 4 | – | 3 | 8 | – | 5 |
| South Florida | 3 | – | 4 | 8 | – | 5 |
| Louisville | 3 | – | 4 | 7 | – | 6 |
| Cincinnati | 2 | – | 5 | 4 | – | 8 |
| Rutgers | 1 | – | 6 | 4 | – | 8 |
$ – BCS representative as conference champion; + – Conference co-champions; As of January 11, 2011; Rankings from AP Poll

2011 Big East Conference football standings
| | Conf. | | | Overall |
| Team | W | | L | W | | L |
|---|---|---|---|---|---|---|
| No. 17 West Virginia $+ | 5 | – | 2 | 10 | – | 3 |
| No. 25 Cincinnati + | 5 | – | 2 | 10 | – | 3 |
| Louisville + | 5 | – | 2 | 7 | – | 6 |
| Rutgers | 4 | – | 3 | 9 | – | 4 |
| Pittsburgh | 4 | – | 3 | 6 | – | 7 |
| Connecticut | 3 | – | 4 | 5 | – | 7 |
| South Florida | 1 | – | 6 | 5 | – | 7 |
| Syracuse | 1 | – | 6 | 5 | – | 7 |
$ – BCS representative as conference champion; + – Conference co-champions; As of January 11, 2012; Rankings from AP Poll

2012 Big East Conference football standings
| | Conf. | | | Overall |
| Team | W | | L | W | | L |
|---|---|---|---|---|---|---|
| No. 13 Louisville $+ | 5 | – | 2 | 11 | – | 2 |
| Cincinnati + | 5 | – | 2 | 10 | – | 3 |
| Rutgers + | 5 | – | 2 | 9 | – | 4 |
| Syracuse + | 5 | – | 2 | 8 | – | 5 |
| Pittsburgh | 3 | – | 4 | 6 | – | 7 |
| Connecticut | 2 | – | 5 | 5 | – | 7 |
| Temple | 2 | – | 5 | 4 | – | 7 |
| South Florida | 1 | – | 6 | 3 | – | 9 |
$ – BCS representative as conference champion; + – Conference co-champions; Rankings from AP Poll
