= 1996 Orange Bowl (December) =

1996 FedEx Orange Bowl
- 63rd Orange Bowl
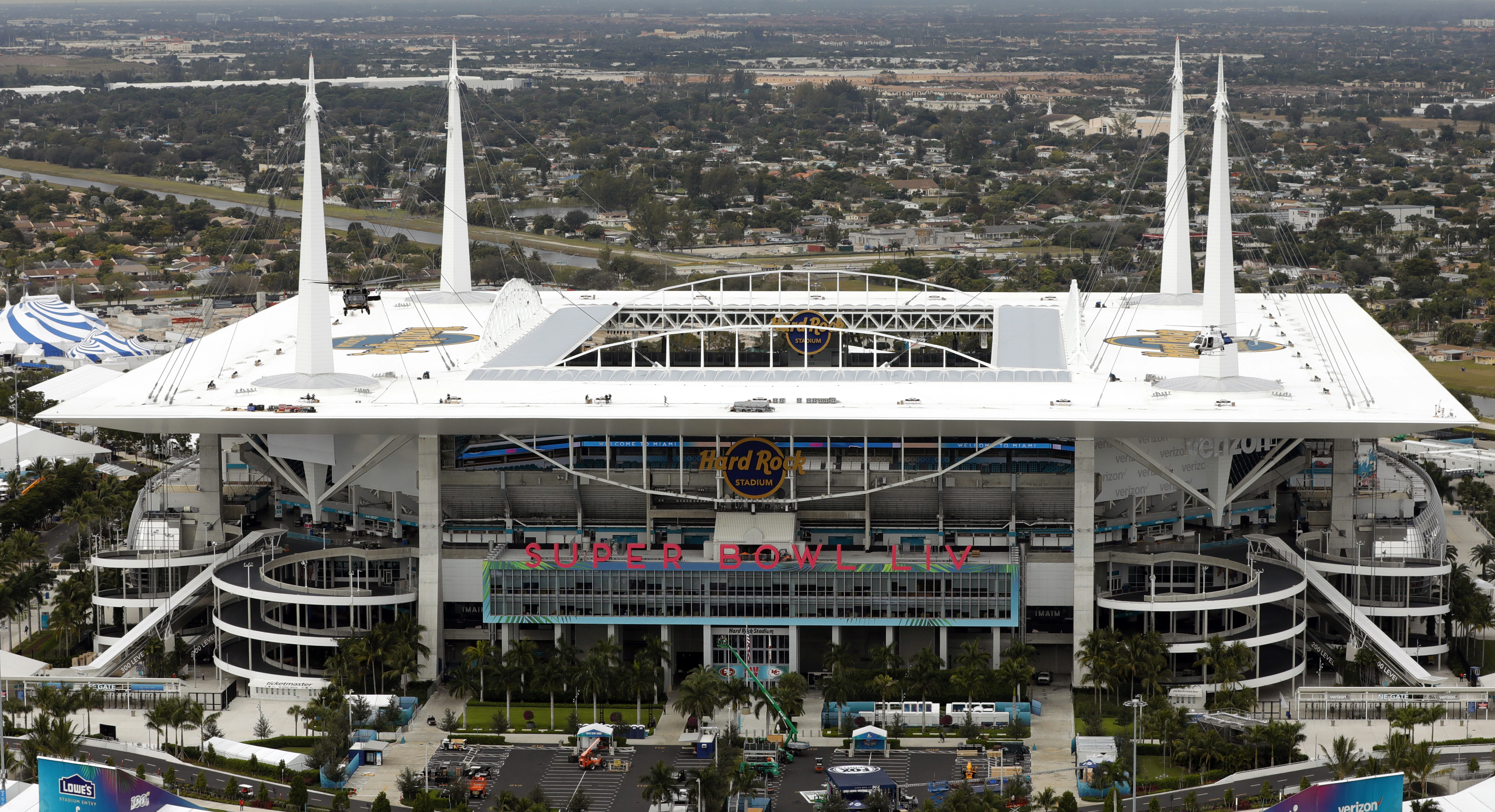
- Pro Player Stadium in Miami, Florida, hosted the Orange Bowl.
Virginia Tech Hokies	Nebraska Cornhuskers
(10–1)	(10–2)
Big East	Big 12
21	41
Head coach: Frank Beamer	Head coach: Tom Osborne
AP / Coaches / BA; 10 / 9 / 9	AP / Coaches / BA; 6 / 6 / 6
	1	2	3	4	Total
Virginia Tech	7	7	7	0	21
Nebraska	0	17	14	10	41
- Date: December 31, 1996
- Season: 1996
- Stadium: Pro Player Stadium
- Location: Miami, Florida
- MVP: Nebraska RB Damon Benning and Virginia Tech RB Ken Oxendine
- Favorite: Nebraska by 16 (46.5)
- Referee: Dick Honig (Big Ten)
- Attendance: 51,212

United States TV coverage
- Network: CBS
- Announcers: Sean McDonough, Mike Mayock, and Dave Logan
- Nielsen ratings: 7.8

The 63rd Orange Bowl, also known as the 1996 Orange Bowl, was a 1996–1997 Bowl Alliance game played on December 31, 1996, on New Year's Eve, between the Nebraska Cornhuskers and the Virginia Tech Hokies. Virginia Tech, champions of the Big East Conference, came into the game with a 10–1 record and #10 AP ranking, whereas Nebraska, members of the Big 12 Conference, came into the game with a 10–2 and No. 6 ranking. In a high-scoring affair, Nebraska defeated Virginia Tech, 41–21.

Due to Bowl Alliance (predecessor to the Bowl Championship Series) rules, the Orange Bowl following the 1996 season was played on December 31, instead of January 1 or later. This marked the first time that an Orange Bowl was played prior to New Year's Day: there were two Orange Bowls in the same calendar year—one in January, following the 1995 season, and the other in December, following the 1996 season. The Orange Bowl Committee, which had the fourth and sixth selections of eligible Bowl Alliance teams, selected Big East champions Virginia Tech and Nebraska, an at-large selection that appeared to be a national championship game contender before its loss to Texas in the inaugural Big 12 Championship Game.

The weeks before the game were filled with controversy, as both teams had multiple players arrested or charged with crimes. Despite having lost their last game before the Orange Bowl, Nebraska was heavily favored over Virginia Tech, as spread bettors favored the Cornhuskers by 16 or 17 points, depending on the source used. The Cornhuskers had won the 1994 and 1995 national championships, and presented an imposing history when compared with that of Virginia Tech, which had posted its most important win in school history at the end of the previous season, defeating Texas in the 1995 Sugar Bowl.

On December 31, the weather was clear and warm at the start of the game, though a light rain began to fall in the fourth quarter. Virginia Tech scored first, taking a 7–0 lead at the end of the first quarter—its only advantage in the game. In the second quarter, Nebraska scored three times for 17 points, taking a 17–7 lead before Virginia Tech quarterback Jim Druckenmiller threw a touchdown pass with 19 seconds remaining in the first half, cutting Nebraska's lead to 17–14. In the third quarter, the two teams alternated scores, with Nebraska maintaining a three or 10-point lead throughout. At the end of the third quarter, Nebraska had a 31–21 lead. In the final quarter of the game, Nebraska scored 10 unanswered points as the Cornhuskers used their large number of backup players to advantage. The final score was 41–21, Nebraska.

== Team selection ==
During the 1996 season, the Orange Bowl was a member of the Bowl Alliance, a precursor to the former Bowl Championship Series. The Bowl Alliance was formed prior to the 1995 college football season in an effort to match the No. 1 and No. 2 teams at the conclusion of the regular season while also ensuring other high-ranking teams were allowed to participate in high-profile bowl games. The Alliance included the Southeastern Conference, Big 12 Conference, Atlantic Coast Conference, and Big East Conference. As agreed, the champions of each conference would play in one of three Bowl Alliance games: the Orange Bowl, Sugar Bowl, and Fiesta Bowl. The Big Ten and Pac-10 conferences, which had a separate agreement with the Rose Bowl, were not included in the Bowl Alliance until 1998, when the Alliance became the Bowl Championship Series.

In 1996, the Orange Bowl had the fourth and sixth selections from eligible Bowl Alliance teams. The Sugar Bowl had the top two picks, while the Fiesta Bowl, which had the top picks in 1995, received the third and fifth picks. Due to Bowl Alliance restrictions, the Orange Bowl at the end of the 1996 season had to be played on December 31, marking the first time in the history of the Orange Bowl that the game was not played in January and that there were two Orange Bowls in the same year—one at the end of the 1995 season, and the other at the conclusion of the 1996 season. The only other time was in 2014, the first year of the college football playoffs.

=== Nebraska ===
The Nebraska Cornhuskers began the 1996 season having won the national championship in both 1994 and 1995. Though Nebraska was now a member of a new conference—the former Big Eight Conference had been merged with four Texas schools to become the Big 12—it was widely expected that Nebraska would repeat the performance for a third time in 1996.

Nebraska was ranked No. 1 in the Associated Press preseason poll, and lived up to the ranking in its first game of the season. On September 7, Nebraska overwhelmed the Michigan State Spartans, 55–14. After an off week, however, Nebraska fans were shocked by one of the first big national upsets of the season as Nebraska was shut out by No. 17 Arizona State, 19–0. The loss dropped Nebraska to No. 8 in the rankings, but as the season wore on, Nebraska rose through the ranks as the Cornhuskers won seven consecutive games. Nebraska's 10–1 record to that point earned it a trip to the first-ever Big 12 Championship Game in St. Louis, Missouri, against the Texas Longhorns.

Despite Nebraska's early-season loss, the Cornhuskers still had a chance to win a record-setting third consecutive national championship. A win against Texas would earn Nebraska a bid to the Sugar Bowl and a game against No. 1 Florida State to decide the national championship. Unfortunately for Nebraska, the underdog Longhorns upset heavily favored Nebraska, 37–27. Eight days after losing to Texas, Nebraska was awarded a bid to the Orange Bowl.

=== Virginia Tech ===
The Virginia Tech Hokies entered the 1996 season having ended 1995 with a victory over No. 9 Texas in the 1995 Sugar Bowl (December), considered to be the most important game in Virginia Tech history to that point. Following the victory, hopes were high that the Hokies would repeat the performance in the 1996 season.

Virginia Tech kicked off the 1996 season in Akron, Ohio, against the Akron Zips. The Hokies were nearly upset by the Zips, but eventually won the game, 21–18. Tech dropped in rank due to the close finish, and traveled next to Boston, Massachusetts, to play the Boston College Eagles. In a nationally televised game, Tech defeated the Eagles, 45–7. The Hokies followed that win with a home-opening victory against Rutgers, then traveled to Syracuse, New York, to play the Syracuse Orangemen. Though the Hokies lost, 21–52, they recovered to win their final seven games of the regular season, securing a Big East championship and a trip to the Orange Bowl.

There was no small amount of controversy generated by Virginia Tech's selection ahead of fifth-ranked, 13-1 BYU. The Cougars, who had just defeated a ranked Wyoming team to win the WAC championship and who had also upset then-thirteenth-ranked Texas A&M early in the season, were statistically more dominant than the Hokies and seen by many as more deserving of an Orange Bowl berth. They also featured All-American quarterback and NCAA passing leader Steve Sarkisian. A press conference held by the Orange Bowl selection committee attempted to explain the selection process, but was met with instantaneous ridicule from many sides, most notably Penn State's Joe Paterno, who publicly lamented the "political" nature of the selection process.

== Pregame buildup ==
"For Virginia Tech, this is the biggest game in their history.
They're starving for national recognition."

— CBS commentator Mike Mayock

Nebraska was heavily favored to win the contest, as the point spread favored Nebraska by 16 points to 17 points. Heading into the Orange Bowl, the two teams presented a study in contrasts. The Cornhuskers boasted a string of 28 seasons with nine or more victories, received 28 straight bowl bids, spent 256 consecutive weeks ranked in the AP poll, and had recorded 214 straight sellouts in their 75,000-capacity home stadium. Virginia Tech, meanwhile, had a bowl streak dating back just three years, to the 1993 Independence Bowl, and while the game was Nebraska's 16th Orange Bowl, it was Virginia Tech's first. Nebraska and Virginia Tech were among the winningest seven teams in Division I-A college football during the two seasons prior to the Orange Bowl. Virginia Tech had 20 wins in those two seasons, while Nebraska had 22 victories.

In the first weeks after the matchup was announced, Virginia Tech sold its allotment of 15,000 tickets, while Nebraska sales lagged, only reaching the 5,000 mark in the time it took Tech to sell its allotment. The slow Nebraska sales were largely due to fans who had booked trips to the Sugar Bowl in anticipation of a victory by the Cornhuskers in the Big 12 championship game. Disappointed by the loss, many people elected not to make the trip to Miami. By December 27, four days prior to the game, Tech had increased its total to 15,500, while Nebraska improved to 8,000 sold. The game was the first Orange Bowl to be played at Miami's professional football arena, Pro Player Stadium, instead of Orange Bowl stadium. The move was made in order to secure the Orange Bowl's place in the Bowl Alliance, as Pro Player Stadium was a more modern facility with a larger seating capacity.

=== Off-field problems ===
In the months, weeks and days prior to the Orange Bowl, the Virginia Tech football team was affected by multiple criminal incidents. In the 15 months immediately prior to the Orange Bowl, Virginia Tech players accumulated 22 arrests, six convictions, and four charges dropped. The most notable of these arrests came on December 16, slightly more than two weeks prior to the Orange Bowl, when Brian Edmonds, the Hokies' starting fullback, and James Crawford, a backup wide receiver, were arrested on charges of rape and attempted sodomy. The two players were immediately suspended from the football team. The day before the Orange Bowl, Virginia Tech coach Frank Beamer announced further suspensions, indicating that backup defensive tackle Nat Williams, backup linebacker Tyron Edmond, and backup receiver Angelo Harrison would not participate in the Orange Bowl. For Nebraska, linebacker Terrell Farley was arrested for DUI and six related misdemeanors on November 20, his second offense that season after being charged on August 30. He was thrown off the team after this second offense.

=== Offensive matchups ===
==== Nebraska offense ====
At the conclusion of the 1996 regular season, the Nebraska Cornhuskers boasted the No. 4 rushing offense in Division I-A college football, averaging 292 rushing yards per game and 422 overall yards per game. Despite those figures, the Cornhuskers' two leading rushers were hampered by injury and their participation was in doubt. Ahman Green, who led the Nebraska offense with 155 carries, 917 rushing yards, and seven touchdowns, suffered a stress fracture in his foot during the second-to-last Nebraska regular-season game. The No. 2 rusher, DeAngelo Evans, had 776 rushing yards and a team-high 14 rushing touchdowns, but was limited by a groin injury. Because of the injuries, Damon Benning, who earned 465 yards and seven touchdowns during the regular seasons, was anticipated to see significant playing time. Wide receiver Brenden Holbein also suffered an ankle injury in practice, but was able to play.

At quarterback, Nebraska had Scott Frost, a transfer player from Stanford who had 1,440 passing yards, 13 passing touchdowns, three interceptions, and 578 rushing yards in his first season with the team. Frost's three interceptions were the third-least in Division I-A; only Army and Ohio University had fewer. Overall, Nebraska totaled 5,069 yards of offense and 42.7 points per game, the most in the Big 12.

==== Virginia Tech offense ====
Virginia Tech was led on offense by quarterback Jim Druckenmiller. During the 1996 season, he completed 142 of his 250 pass attempts for 2,071 yards, 17 touchdowns, and five interceptions, boosting his career total to 4,383 yards and 34 touchdowns. Because of these numbers, he was considered one of the top quarterback prospects in the upcoming NFL draft. Despite Druckenmiller's success, it was the Hokies' rushing game that received most of the attention. The Hokies averaged 4.8 yards per rushing attempt and produced 2,504 yards rushing and 27 touchdowns during the regular season. Tech's 227.6-yards-per-game rushing average was No. 2 in the Big East Conference and No. 19 among 111 Division I-A schools.

Three players in particular contributed to that rushing success. Running backs Ken Oxendine, Marcus Parker, and Shyrone Stith combined for 1,831 yards of Tech's total. Oxendine, who missed 2½ games due to injury, accumulated career highs of 890 rushing yards and 13 touchdowns. Parker, who missed four games due to a discipline-related suspension, earned 467 yards and four touchdowns. Stith, meanwhile, had 474 yards and five touchdowns. Helping block the way for the rushers was center Billy Conaty, who was named an All-American by the Sporting News and who was playing in a then-school record 48th straight game.

=== Defensive matchups ===
==== Virginia Tech defense ====
The Hokies were led on defense by All-America defensive end selection Cornell Brown, who accumulated eight sacks, five other tackles for loss, 19 quarterback hurries, and 58 total tackles during the regular season and was named a first-team All-Big East selection, signifying his status as the best player at his position in that conference. This followed being named National Defensive Player of the Year at the end of the previous season. Tech's leading tackler was linebacker Brandon Semones, who accumulated 88 during the season. Free safety Torrian Gray also was a significant presence on the Virginia Tech defense. Gray ranked No. 1 on the team in solo tackles with 58, and was No. 3 in total tackles, with 76. He started every game for Tech during the three seasons immediately prior to the Orange Bowl and was a second-team All-Big East pick in 1996. Gray was supported in the defensive secondary by Antonio Banks, who caught a Tech-best four interceptions during the regular season.

In a December 26 practice, Virginia Tech linebacker Myron Newsome suffered an ankle injury that threatened to force him to sit out the Orange Bowl. Newsome, who had been a starter during the regular season, eventually recovered to participate in the game, but his injury was a point of media interest in the days prior to kickoff. Two other Virginia Tech defenders were injured during practice prior to the game. Cornell Brown suffered a minor leg injury, while defensive end John Engelberger broke his nose.

==== Nebraska defense ====
The Nebraska Cornhuskers' defense was ranked No. 5 in the country in rushing defense and scoring defense, allowing averages of just 83.8 rushing yards and 12.8 points per game. Nebraska also was ranked No. 7 in total defense, permitting just 255.4 yards per game. The cornerstones of that defense were Nebraska's two All-American defensive ends, Jared Tomich and Grant Wistrom. Tomich recorded five sacks, 10 tackles for loss, and a team-best 23 quarterback hurries during the 1996 regular season. In recognition of his performance, he was named a second-team AP All-American and was a finalist for the Lombardi Award. Wistrom, meanwhile, led Nebraska with 9.5 sacks and 20 tackles for loss. He was named a consensus All-American, indicating his selection as a first-team All-American by all the major selection panels. Neither man was Nebraska's leading tackler, however. That honor went to defensive tackle Jason Peter, who had 58 and was named a first-team All-Big 12 selection.

In the defensive secondary, defensive back Mike Minter led the Cornhuskers in interceptions, catching five and returning one for a touchdown during the regular season. Supporting Minter was cornerback Ralph Brown, who had 12 pass breakups.

== Game summary ==
The 1996 Orange Bowl kicked off on December 31, 1996, at 7:17 p.m. EST. The game's attendance was announced as 51,212, giving it the lowest attendance for an Orange Bowl since 1947. This poor attendance was despite the fact that more than 64,000 tickets were sold for the game. Many of the unused tickets were purchased in blocs by corporations that failed to use them. The game was televised on CBS, and Mike Mayock, Sean McDonough, and Dave Logan were the broadcasters. Approximately 8.8 million people tuned in to watch the game on television, earning the broadcast a Nielsen rating of 7.8. The temperature at kickoff was 75 degrees, and the weather was clear, with 75 percent humidity and wind from the east at six mph. Dick Honig was the referee, the umpire was Jim Augustyn, and the linesman was Ed Peters.

=== First quarter ===
Virginia Tech won the traditional pre-game coin toss and elected to kick off to Nebraska to begin the game. The Hokie kickoff was returned to the Nebraska 25-yard line, where the Cornhuskers ran the first play of the game. On that first play, Frost completed a five-yard pass to Brendan Holbein. This was followed by two rushes by Benning, who picked up 18 yards and a first down in the process. Benning then crossed into the Virginia Tech half of the field with a five-yard rush. Frost then threw an incomplete pass, and Benning was unable to pick up another first down after gaining two yards on a pass from Frost. Nebraska punter Jesse Kosch came on to the field to punt to Virginia Tech. The kick sailed into the end zone for a touchback, and Virginia Tech began its first possession at its 20-yard line.

Tech's first drive began inauspiciously for the Hokies. Druckenmiller threw an incomplete pass on the first Tech play, then was sacked for a four-yard loss. Facing third down, Druckenmiller evaded another sack and connected with Oxendine on a 41-yard pass that picked up a first down and pushed Tech into the Nebraska side of the field. Despite the gain, the Hokies were unable to gain another first down as Oxendine ran for one yard before Druckenmiller threw two successive incomplete passes. Virginia Tech punter Jimmy Kibble kicked the ball back to Nebraska, which returned it to its 15-yard line, and the Nebraska offense returned to the field.

With 9:28 remaining in the quarter, Nebraska's second possession of the game mirrored its first. The Cornhuskers picked up a first down on a Scott Frost throw, but were unable to gain another after being stopped for a loss on one play and had to punt. Following the kick, Virginia Tech took over at its 28-yard line. The Hokies performed better than their first possession, picking up a quick first down on two rushes by Oxendine. Druckenmiller then completed a first-down throw that pushed the Hokies into Nebraska territory for a second time. Druckenmiller rushed for eight yards on the next play, then ran an option with Oxendine that saw the players combine for 20 yards and a first down. Now at the Nebraska 20-yard line, Oxendine ran for a yard, pushing the Hokies into the red zone. On the first play inside the Nebraska red zone, Druckenmiller completed a 19-yard pass to Marcus Parker for a Virginia Tech touchdown—the game's first points. Virginia Tech placekicker Shayne Graham kicked the extra point, and Virginia Tech took a 7–0 lead with 3:14 remaining in the first quarter. The drive covered 72 yards and had taken eight plays and 4:06 of game time.

Following the post-touchdown kickoff and a short return, Nebraska's offense began work at its 21-yard line. Three rushes by as many different players—Joel Makovicka, Damon Benning, and Jay Sims—resulted in 11 yards and a first down. During Sims' run, Tech's Loren Johnson committed a 15-yard personal foul facemask penalty that pushed Nebraska to the Nebraska 47-yard line. From there, Frost threw an incomplete pass, then Sims ran twice for fifteen yards and a first down, crossing into the Virginia Tech half of the field in the process. Now at the Tech 38-yard line, Frost completed a 23-yard throw to Lance Brown, who picked up another first down at the Tech 15-yard line. With time running out in the quarter, the Cornhuskers executed a quick four-yard rush to the Tech 11-yard line. At the end of the first quarter, Virginia Tech led Nebraska, 7–0, but the Cornhuskers were in scoring position.

=== Second quarter ===
The second quarter began with Nebraska in possession of the ball at the Virginia Tech 11-yard line and facing a second down and needing six yards. On the first play of the quarter, Nebraska rusher Brian Schuster was tackled for a five-yard loss in a failed trick play, pushing Nebraska back to the 16-yard line. Sims rushed for eight yards on third down, but failed to pick up the first down and Nebraska sent kicker Kris Brown into the game. Brown's 25-yard field goal was successful, and Nebraska cut Virginia Tech's lead to 7–3 with 13:25 remaining before halftime.

The post-score kickoff rolled into the end zone for a touchback, and Virginia Tech began at its 20-yard line. On the first play, Nebraska committed a five-yard offsides penalty. Shyrone Stith and Parker then ran for a combined six yards on the next two plays, picking up a first down with the shortened yardage provided by the penalty. From the first down at the Tech 31-yard line, Druckenmiller threw three consecutive passes: The first was incomplete, the second gained one yard, and the third gained nine yards and a first down. After that gain, however, Tech lost yardage on a rush by Oxendine, Druckenmiller threw an incomplete pass, then was sacked for a loss of nine yards during the third down play. Kibble punted, and Nebraska began at the Tech 45-yard line after the kick was returned 26 yards by Michael Hawkes. The Cornhuskers took quick advantage of the good field position. Ahman Green ran 17 yards for a first down, then Frost passed for 23 yards to Kenny Cheatham, pushing Nebraska inside the Virginia Tech red zone. On just the third play after Virginia Tech's punt, Frost ran the remaining five yards, crossing the goal line for a touchdown. The extra point was good, and with 9:14 remaining, Nebraska took a 10–7 lead.

Before the subsequent kickoff, Virginia Tech committed a 15-yard personal foul penalty, allowing Nebraska to kick off from the 50-yard line instead of the regulation 35-yard line. The kick resulted in a touchback, and Tech started from its 20-yard line. Oxendine picked up nine yards on a rush, and Parker earned another seven yards for a first down at the Tech 36. Oxendine then ran three consecutive times for 17 yards and a first down. After Parker was stopped for no gain, Druckenmiller ran the ball himself for a seven-yard gain and a first down at the Nebraska 40-yard line. Oxendine gained one yard on a carry to the left, but on the next play, Druckenmiller was sacked for an 11-yard loss, negating the minor gain. Druckenmiller then completed a 24-yard pass to Oxendine, but the play was negated by a holding penalty against Virginia Tech, effectively resulting in a loss of 34 yards and pushing the Hokies back to their 33-yard line. On the first play after the holding penalty, Druckenmiller fumbled the football after he was jarred by Nebraska defender Mike Rucker. The loose ball was picked up by Cornhusker Jason Peter, who ran 31 yards for a defensive touchdown. The score gave Nebraska a 17–7 lead with 3:36 remaining in the first half.

Following the kickoff, Virginia Tech's offense began work to cut Nebraska's lead before halftime. The Hokies started at their 20-yard line after a touchback, and Druckenmiller completed a 20-yard throw to Bryan Jennings after Oxendine was stopped for no gain on a carry to the left. From the Tech 40-yard line, Oxendine carried the ball 39 yards for another first down deep inside Nebraska's half of the field. Nebraska committed a five-yard offsides penalty, but Virginia Tech was stopped for short gains on the two plays following the penalty. Virginia Tech was forced to use a timeout in order to stop the clock from moving and to allow time to plan the third-down play. With 57 seconds remaining in the first half, Parker ran the remaining two yards for a first down at the Nebraska 11-yard line. Druckenmiller then completed a five-yard pass to Cornelius White, but because White was unable to get out of bounds or cross the goal line, Tech was again forced to call a timeout to stop the clock with 25 seconds remaining. On the next play, Druckenmiller completed a six-yard pass to Shawn Scales for Tech's second touchdown of the game. The score came with 19 seconds remaining in the first half, and the extra point was good, cutting Nebraska's lead to 17–14.

With just a few seconds remaining in the first half, there appeared to be little chance that Nebraska would have a chance to score. But Nebraska received the kickoff at its 24-yard line and returned it to the Nebraska 42. Frost attempted a long pass to get Nebraska into position for a field goal attempt, but the throw fell incomplete. Instead of trying another long pass, Nebraska proceeded to run out the clock, and the Cornhuskers went into halftime with a 17–14 lead.

=== Third quarter ===
Because Nebraska received the ball to begin the game, Virginia Tech received the ball to begin the second half. Following the kickoff and return, Virginia Tech began at its 19-yard line. On the first play of the second half, Oxendine broke loose for a 36-yard run to the Nebraska 45-yard line and a first down. Despite that strong opening play, Tech was unable to gain another first down and was forced to punt after gaining only two additional yards. The Tech punt rolled out of bounds at the Nebraska 26-yard line.

The Cornhuskers' subsequent drive did not have the initial offensive explosion of Tech's drive, but it was in the end more successful. Benning rushed for five yards and Jeff Lake caught a 10-yard pass for a first down at the Nebraska 41-yard line. Frost then threw two incomplete passes and a nine-yard toss to Vershan Jackson. Facing fourth down and needing one yard, Nebraska head coach Tom Osborne elected to attempt to gain the yardage rather than punt the ball. Benning rushed for three yards, and Nebraska was able to convert the fourth down into another first down. Benning followed that success with another, breaking loose for a 33-yard run and the first touchdown of the second half. The extra point was good, and Nebraska extended its lead to 24–14 with 4:58 remaining in the quarter.

Following the Nebraska kickoff, Tech tried to answer the Cornhusker score with one of its own. The Hokies started at their 20-yard line after a touchback. Parker caught an eight-yard pass from Druckenmiller, then ran for three yards and a first down. With a first down at the Tech 31-yard line, Druckenmiller threw an incomplete pass. This was followed by a four-yard run by Oxendine and a ten-yard completion by Druckenmiller for another first down, this time to the Tech 45-yard line. Oxendine picked up three yards on two short runs, then Druckenmiller advanced the Hokies into the Nebraska side of the field with a 19-yard pass to Jennings. Oxendine was stopped for no gain and Druckenmiller threw an incompletion, but on third down, Druckenmiller connected with White for a 33-yard gain and Tech's first touchdown of the second half. The extra point was good, and the Hokies again trimmed Nebraska's lead to three points: 24–21. Tech's drive covered 80 yards in 12 plays and 4:56 of game time.

The Cornhuskers' offense returned to the field with 4:58 remaining in the third quarter. Nebraska began at its 39-yard line after the kickoff was returned 23 yards. Frost ran four yards, and Benning earned eight yards with two rushes, giving Nebraska a first down at the Tech 49-yard line. Frost's first pass of the drive fell incomplete, but Benning ran seven yards and Frost completed his second pass of the drive for nine yards and another first down, this time to the Tech 33-yard line. Three more rushes created 10 more yards and another first down, but a bigger loss came to the Tech defense when Hokie All-American Cornell Brown was injured. Nebraska's offense inexorably pressed onward, aided by a 15-yard pass interference penalty against Virginia Tech, and Nebraska capitalized on a six-yard rush by Benning, giving Nebraska a touchdown with 20 seconds remaining in the quarter. The extra point was good, and Nebraska returned to a 10-point lead, 31–21.

Nebraska's kickoff was returned to the Tech 19-yard line, and Oxendine ran one yard on the last play of the third quarter. With one quarter remaining in the game, Virginia Tech was in possession of the ball, but trailed, 31–21.

=== Fourth quarter ===
The fourth quarter began with Virginia Tech in possession of the ball and facing a second-and-nine at its 20-yard line. On the first play of the quarter, Druckenmiller completed a 20-yard pass to Oxendine for a first down at the Tech 40-yard line. Parker ran for three yards, but Tech was forced to call a timeout before the next play. During the timeout, a light rain began to fall that would last through the remainder of the game. Coming out of the timeout, Druckenmiller threw an incomplete pass, but made it up on the next play by rushing for 16 yards, picking up a first down at the 41-yard line of Nebraska. This was followed by another rush by Druckenmiller, this time for nine yards. The two gains were negated on the next play, however, as Virginia Tech committed a penalty that pushed the Hokies back to their 41-yard line. Druckenmiller then threw two incomplete passes, and Tech was forced to punt.

Nebraska began its possession at its five-yard line after the returner was tackled for a three-yard loss and the Cornhuskers were assessed six yards of penalties during the return. Frost threw an incomplete pass, Schuster ran for four yards, then Frost completed a 14-yard pass to Shevin Wiggins for a first down at the Nebraska 23-yard line. Frost continued the drive by earning nine yards on an option, then Schuster picked up three yards for another first down. Sims followed this by gaining 22 yards and two first downs on the next three plays. Frost then completed a 17-yard throw to Jeff Lake for a first down at Tech's 26-yard line. Just outside Tech's red zone, however, the drive petered out. Sims was stopped for a short loss, Frost ran for eight yards, and threw an incomplete pass, causing a fourth down. Kris Brown kicked his second field goal of the game, this time a 37-yard kick, which was successful. With 7:52 remaining in the game, Nebraska had a 34–21 lead.

With time running out, Virginia Tech's offense returned to the field needing to score. Nebraska's kickoff was downed in the end zone for a touchback, and the Hokies started at their 20-yard line. The Hokies' need for quick points was foiled by an injury to Druckenmiller, who left the game after throwing an incomplete pass on the first play of the drive. Backup quarterback Al Clark was unable to gain a first down, and neither was Druckenmiller, who returned to the game for third down. Tech punted back to Nebraska, which returned the kick to its 45-yard line.

Cornhusker Ahman Green, who had started most of Nebraska's games during the regular season, entered the game and ran three straight plays for 24 yards. On the third play, Green fumbled the ball, which was recovered by a Nebraska player. Frost then completed an 11-yard pass for a first down to the Tech 21-yard line. The Cornhuskers were stopped for losses on two consecutive running plays, but Frost broke free for a 22-yard touchdown run. The score and subsequent extra point gave the Cornhuskers a 41–21 lead with 3:26 remaining in the game.

The limited time left in the game meant there was little chance the Hokies could make good the 20-point deficit. Tech's hopes flared after Nebraska's kickoff was returned 67 yards to the Nebraska 25-yard line, providing a chance for a quick score. Druckenmiller completed a 14-yard pass after the long return, giving Tech a first down at the 11-yard line, but the Hokies were unable to advance the ball much further. Oxendine ran for five yards, but Druckenmiller threw three incomplete passes, turning the ball over on downs. With a firm lead, Nebraska proceeded to run four short rushes, running out the clock and bringing the game to an end. Nebraska won the 63rd Orange Bowl, 41–21.

== Statistical summary ==
Statistical comparison
	NU	VT
1st downs	25	22
Total yards	415	407
Passing yards	136	214
Rushing yards	279	193
Penalties	3–16	5–89
3rd-down conversions	11–16	6–16
4th-down conversions	1–1	0–1
Turnovers	0	1
Time of possession	28:58	31:02

From 1970 through 1998, the Orange Bowl Committee, organizers of the Orange Bowl, recognized two most valuable players. Following the 63rd Orange Bowl, Virginia Tech running back Ken Oxendine and Nebraska running back Damon Benning were awarded the honor. Oxendine carried the ball 20 times during the game for a total of 150 rushing yards—an average of 7.5 yards per carry. He also caught three passes for 60 yards, making him the game's leading receiver as well as its leading rusher. Benning, meanwhile, carried the ball 15 times for 96 yards and two touchdowns. He also caught one pass for two yards and returned one kickoff 23 yards.

Oxendine accounted for the majority of Virginia Tech's 193 total rushing yards, but Nebraska had many more players run the ball than just Benning, who accounted for just over one-third of Nebraska's 279-yard rushing total. Scott Frost carried the ball nine times for 62 yards and two touchdowns for the Cornhuskers, and Ahman Green, despite being hampered by his injured foot, managed seven carries for 52 yards. All told, seven Nebraska players managed to carry the ball at least once. Virginia Tech, on the other hand, saw just four players carry the ball, and its No. 2 rusher, Marcus Parker, had eight carries for 22 yards.

Though behind in the rushing game, Tech's passing offense finished ahead of Nebraska's. Hokie quarterback Jim Druckenmiller completed 16 of his 33 pass attempts, earning 214 passing yards and three touchdowns. On the opposite side of the ball, Nebraska quarterback Scott Frost earned just 136 passing yards from 11 completed passes and 22 attempts. Combining the rushing and passing totals results in a similar total offensive performance from both teams. Virginia Tech finished the game with 407 net yards from 72 offensive plays, while Nebraska eked 415 net yards from 71 offensive plays. The Hokies had a slight advantage in the time of possession, 31:02 to 28:58. The real statistical difference comes in penalties—Tech committed five for 89 yards, while Nebraska had just three for 16 yards—and turnovers. The sole turnover in the game was a Virginia Tech fumble returned for a touchdown. Neither quarterback threw an interception.

Oxendine's 150 rushing yards for Tech were the fifth-highest total in the history of the Orange Bowl to that point. Druckenmiller's three touchdown passes came behind only Notre Dame quarterback Danny Kanell's four touchdown passes in the previous season's Orange Bowl. Virginia Tech center Billy Conaty set a Virginia Tech record by making his 48th consecutive start in a game.

On defense, Virginia Tech's Torrian Gray led all defenders with 12 total tackles. Second was Nebraska's Mike Minter, who had 11 tackles and a pass breakup. Two Nebraska players had nine tackles apiece, and one of those players, Octavious McFarlin, recorded two tackles for loss. Nebraska recorded three sacks of Jim Druckenmiller, while the Virginia Tech defense was unable to sack Scott Frost. The Hokies did manage seven tackles for loss, compared to Nebraska's five.

== Postgame effects ==
Nebraska's win pushed it to a final 1996 record of 11–2, while Virginia Tech's loss dropped it to 10–2 on the season. In the final Associated Press poll of the season, the Hokies finished 13th nationally.

Thanks to its appearance in the Orange Bowl and a revenue-sharing agreement with other Big East schools, Virginia Tech earned $3.981 million for playing in the 1996 Orange Bowl. $3.5 million of that total came directly from the bowl, while the remaining $481,000 came from the revenue-sharing pool generated by all the Big East teams that participated in bowl games. The almost-$4 million payout made Virginia Tech's football team the wealthiest of the 36 schools that participated in bowl games after the 1996 season.

Multiple players from each team were selected in the 1997 NFL draft, which took place April 19–20, 1997. Nebraska had eight players selected: Michael Booker, Jared Tomich, Mike Minter, Adam Treu, Chris Dishman, Jamel Williams, Eric Stokes, and Jon Hesse.
