= 1996 Orange Bowl =

1996 Orange Bowl may refer to:

- 1996 Orange Bowl (January), between the Florida State Seminoles and the Notre Dame Fighting Irish
- 1996 Orange Bowl (December), between the Nebraska Cornhuskers and the Virginia Tech Hokies
