= 1996 Pittsburgh Panthers football team =

American college football season

1996 Pittsburgh Panthers football
- Conference: Big East Conference
- Record: 4–7 (3–4 Big East)
- Head coach: Johnny Majors (8th season)
- Offensive coordinator: Ken Karcher (4th season)
- Offensive scheme: Multiple
- Defensive coordinator: Chuck Driesbach (4th season)
- Base defense: Multiple 4–3
- Home stadium: Pitt Stadium

1996 Big East Conference football standings
	Conf.			Overall
Team	W		L	W		L
No. 13 Virginia Tech +	6	–	1	10	–	2
No. 14 Miami (FL) +	6	–	1	9	–	3
No. 21 Syracuse +	6	–	1	9	–	3
West Virginia	4	–	3	8	–	4
Pittsburgh	3	–	4	4	–	7
Boston College	2	–	5	5	–	7
Rutgers	1	–	6	2	–	9
Temple	0	–	7	1	–	10
+ – Conference co-champions; Rankings from AP Poll

The 1996 Pittsburgh Panthers football team represented the University of Pittsburgh in the 1996 NCAA Division I-A football season. The season proved to be a major disappointment as the Panthers finished 4–7, 8th in the Big East. They finished 3–4 within their conference and were 1–3 in non-conference affairs. In their 4th game, the Panthers were annihilated by Ohio State, 72–0. This was the worst loss in school history.

== Schedule ==
Date	Time	Opponent	Site	TV	Result	Attendance	Source
August 31	7:30 p.m.	West Virginia	Pitt Stadium; Pittsburgh, PA (Backyard Brawl)	ESPN	L 0–34	54,612	
September 7	7:00 p.m.	Kent State*	Pitt Stadium; Pittsburgh, PA		W 52–14	24,374	
September 14	7:00 p.m.	Houston*	Pitt Stadium; Pittsburgh, PA		L 35–42 ^{OT}	27,648	
September 21	12:30 p.m.	at No. 7 Ohio State*	Ohio Stadium; Columbus, OH	ESPN	L 0–72	93,959	
September 28	12:00 p.m.	at No. 10 Miami (FL)	Miami Orange Bowl; Miami, FL	ESPN Plus	L 0–45	32,747	
October 5	1:30 p.m.	Temple	Pitt Stadium; Pittsburgh, PA		W 53–52	30,054	
October 12	12:00 p.m.	at Syracuse	Carrier Dome; Syracuse, NY (rivalry)	ESPN Plus	L 7–55	45,103	
October 26	12:00 p.m.	at Virginia Tech	Lane Stadium; Blacksburg, VA	ESPN Plus	L 17–34	43,625	
October 31	8:00 p.m.	Boston College	Pitt Stadium; Pittsburgh, PA	ESPN	W 20–13	26,313	
November 16	2:30 p.m.	at No. 14 Notre Dame*	Notre Dame Stadium; Notre Dame, IN (rivalry)	NBC	L 6–60	59,075	
November 30	12:00 p.m.	Rutgers	Pitt Stadium; Pittsburgh, PA		W 24–9	21,772	
*Non-conference game; Rankings from AP Poll released prior to the game; All times are in Eastern time

== Coaching staff ==
1996 Pittsburgh Panthers football staff
Coaching staff: Johnny Majors – Head coach; Charlie Coe – Assistant head coach/running backs; Bob Babich – Linebackers/special teams; Curt Cignetti – Tight ends/recruiting coordinator; Joe D'Alessandris – Offensive line; Chuck Dreisbach – Defensive coordinator; Ken Karcher – Offensive coordinator/quarterbacks; Gary Nord – Wide receivers; Tony Pierce – Defensive backs; Tom Turchetta – Defensive line	Support staff: Jim Earle – Assistant Athletic Director/football operations; Brian Callahan – Graduate assistant; Andy Rondeau – Graduate assistant	Strength and conditioning staff: Tim Wilson – Strength and conditioning Coach; Mark Kostek – Assistant Strength and Conditioning Coach

== Roster ==
1996 Pittsburgh Panthers football team roster
Players
Coaches
Offense

Pos.	#	Name	Class
WR	21	Chiffon Allen	Fr
WR	23	Curtis Anderson	Sr
RB	39	Chris Beasley	Sr
OL	60	Jeff Craig	Sr
QB	1	Darnell Dinkins	Fr
QB	10	Pete Gonzalez	Jr
OL	74	Ben Kopp	Fr
QB	8	Matt Lytle	So
TE	88	Kirk McMullen	Fr

Defense

Pos.	#	Name	Class
DL	58	Jason Chavis	Sr
LB	95	Phil Clarke	So
LB	80	Ernest Coakley	Jr
DL	98	Mike Mohring	Sr

Special teams

Pos.	#	Name	Class

Head coach

- Johnny Majors

Coordinators/assistant coaches

Legend

- (C) Team captain
- (S) Suspended
- (I) Ineligible
- Injured
- Redshirt

Roster
Last update: 1996-12-19

== Team players drafted into the NFL ==
Player	Position	Round	Pick	NFL club
No Players Selected
