= Bowl Alliance =

Agreement among football bowl games

- In operation: 1995–1997
- Preceded by: Various contemporary and retroactive selectors (1869–1935); National polls (1936–1991); Bowl Coalition (1992–1994)
- Succeeded by: Bowl Championship Series (1998–2013); College Football Playoff and New Year's Six (2014–present)
- Number of Alliance games: 3 per season
- Championship trophy: Bowl Alliance Trophy
- Television partner(s): ABC and CBS
- Most Bowl Alliance appearances: Florida State and Nebraska (3)
- Most Bowl Alliance wins: Nebraska (3)
- Most Bowl Alliance championships: Nebraska (2)
- Conference with most appearances: Big 12 (4)
- Conference with most game wins: Big 12 (3)
- Conference with most championships: Big Eight, Big 12 and SEC (1)
- Last championship game: 1998 Orange Bowl
- Last champion: Nebraska

The Bowl Alliance was a scheduling agreement between college football conferences and three bowl games for the purpose of scheduling post-season games between the nation's top teams, with the goal of organizing a No. 1 vs. No. 2 national championship game in one of the participating bowls.

The Alliance branded the Sugar Bowl, Orange Bowl, and Fiesta Bowl as the season's Great Games. Under the Alliance system, the games were played on three different nights and no longer competed with each other for television audiences.

The agreement, which replaced the Bowl Coalition, was in place for the 1995, 1996, and 1997 seasons. Each participating team in the Bowl Alliance Championship received $8.5 million from the television sponsors.

== Background ==
In its beginnings, the Bowl Alliance involved the SEC, Big Eight, SWC, ACC, and Big East conference champions, as well as independent Notre Dame. Because of this, only one at-large slot was available for teams to vie for. With the disbanding of the Big Eight and SWC following the 1995 football season and the formation of the Big 12 Conference in its wake, an additional at-large bid became available. The Alliance bowls were held on three successive days in each of the three years of the Alliance's existence with one game played on New Year's Eve, one on New Year's Day, and one on January 2. A Bowl Alliance Poll was formed by adding together the point totals from AP Poll and Coaches' Poll. The top two ranked teams from the Alliance conferences met in the Bowl Alliance national championship game, which rotated between the three Alliance bowls and was always held on January 2.

Because the Big Ten and Pac-10 conferences were contractually tied to the Rose Bowl via automatic bids for their conference champions, their conference champions could not participate in the Alliance Bowls. Nevertheless, the conferences could be represented in the games if one of their teams procured an at-large bid to a Bowl Alliance game. This occurred twice, with Penn State playing in the 1997 Fiesta Bowl and Ohio State in the 1998 Sugar Bowl.

CBS and ABC split television coverage of the Bowl Alliance, with CBS acquiring the rights to the Orange and Fiesta Bowls from NBC following their 1995 playings and ABC already being in possession of the Sugar Bowl rights as they had been since 1970.

In the last two years of the Bowl Alliance, the possibility existed for a split national championship. In 1996, No. 1 Florida State played No. 3 Florida for the national championship in the Sugar Bowl while No. 2 Pac-10 champion Arizona State was locked into playing in the Rose Bowl against No. 4 Ohio State. Arizona State lost to Ohio State in the 1997 Rose Bowl, ending the possibility for a split national championship for that season.

In 1997, the same problem occurred but with the #1 team in both polls being locked out of the Bowl Alliance's championship game. Following the regular season, the top three teams in both polls' rankings were Michigan, Nebraska, and Tennessee. As the Big Ten champion, Michigan was contracted to play in the Rose Bowl on January 1. The Orange Bowl was to be played the next night between Nebraska and Tennessee, the top teams in the Alliance rankings, but only a Michigan loss to Washington State would result in an undisputed Bowl Alliance national championship game.

Following the 1997 season the Bowl Alliance's member conferences and bowls joined with the Big Ten and Pac-10 conferences and the Rose Bowl to form the Bowl Championship Series beginning with the 1998 college football season.

== Trophy ==
The Bowl Alliance awarded its own trophy to the winner of its designated national championship game.

Nebraska, winners of the 1996 Fiesta Bowl trophy, were also awarded the Great Games Trophy for the national championship. The trophy was a silver loving cup.

The 1997 season's Alliance trophy was a large crystal chalice. It was awarded to the winning coach Tom Osborne on the field immediately following the Alliance National Championship at the 1998 Orange Bowl.

== Demise ==
Because the Bowl Alliance failed to include the Pac-10, Big Ten (and thus the Rose Bowl), or any so-called mid-major conferences, the Bowl Alliance was reformed just three years after it began. BYU's performance opened the door for mid-major conferences to participate in upper-tier bowls as well. In 1996, despite 18 conference championships in 23 years, one of the winningest records in college football and a #5 ranking in the AP poll, BYU was excluded from a Bowl Alliance bowl and was relegated to the Cotton Bowl (which of the major bowls had been left out when the Bowl Coalition was reformed into the Bowl Alliance), beating Kansas State to finish the season 14–1. The Bowl Coalition was at risk of antitrust enforcement because of its monopoly limiting participation in the most recognized bowls to members of just a few conferences. LaVell Edwards, BYU's head coach, testified in Congress at that time about the inherent unfairness in recruiting for teams who were excluded from bowls simply because of conference affiliation. With the pressure of potential Congressional action, the Bowl Alliance reformed into the Bowl Championship Series that not only included the Big Ten and the Pac-10 conference but also cracked open the door to allow the possibility of a "mid-major" team's participation. BYU's rival Utah became the first mid-major team to participate in a BCS bowl game, the 2005 Fiesta Bowl.

== History and schedule ==
=== 1995–96 season ===
- December 31, 1995 – Sugar Bowl: #11 Virginia Tech (Big East champion) 28, #6 Texas (Southwest champion) 10
- January 1, 1996 – Orange Bowl: #9 Florida State (ACC champion) 31, #8 Notre Dame 26
- January 2, 1996 – Fiesta Bowl, (National Championship Game): #1 Nebraska (Big 8 champion) 62, #2 Florida (SEC champion) 24

=== 1996–97 season ===
- December 31, 1996 – Orange Bowl: #6 Nebraska 41, #9 Virginia Tech (Big East champion) 21
- January 1, 1997 – Fiesta Bowl: #7 Penn State 38, #20 Texas (Big 12 champion) 15
- January 2, 1997 – Sugar Bowl, (National Championship Game): #3 Florida (SEC champion) 52, #1 Florida State (ACC champion) 20

=== 1997–98 season ===
- December 31, 1997 – Fiesta Bowl: #10 Kansas State 35, #14 Syracuse (Big East champion) 18
- January 1, 1998 – Sugar Bowl: #4 Florida State (ACC Champion) 31, #9 Ohio State 14
- January 2, 1998 – Orange Bowl, (National Championship Game): #2 Nebraska (Big 12 champion) 42, #3 Tennessee (SEC champion) 17

Notes
Rankings are from the Bowl Alliance Poll prior to bowl games.
1996 Season: #2 Arizona State (11–0) lost to #4 Ohio State in the Rose Bowl on January 1, 1997.
1997 Season: #2 Nebraska (13–0) would win the Coaches' Poll National Championship, while #1 Michigan, (12–0) and winners of the Rose Bowl, won the Associated Press National Championship.

== Appearances ==
=== Bowl Alliance appearances by team ===
Appearances	School	W	L	Pct	Games
3	Nebraska	3	0	1.000	Won 1996 Fiesta Bowl+ Won 1996 Orange Bowl (December); Won 1998 Orange Bowl+
3	Florida State	2	1	.667	Won 1996 Orange Bowl (January); Lost 1997 Sugar Bowl+ Won 1998 Sugar Bowl
2	Virginia Tech	1	1	.500	Won 1995 Sugar Bowl (December); Lost 1996 Orange Bowl (December)
2	Florida	1	1	.500	Lost 1996 Fiesta Bowl+ Won 1997 Sugar Bowl+
2	Texas	0	2	.000	Lost 1995 Sugar Bowl (December); Lost 1997 Fiesta Bowl (January)
1	Kansas State	1	0	1.000	Won 1997 Fiesta Bowl (December)
1	Penn State	1	0	1.000	Won 1997 Fiesta Bowl (January)
1	Ohio State	0	1	.000	Lost 1998 Sugar Bowl
1	Tennessee	0	1	.000	Lost 1998 Orange Bowl+
1	Syracuse	0	1	.000	Lost 1997 Fiesta Bowl (December)
1	Notre Dame	0	1	.000	Lost 1996 Orange Bowl (January)

+ Denotes Bowl Alliance National Championship Game

=== Bowl Alliance National Championship Game appearances by team ===
Appearances	School	W	L	Pct	Games
2	Nebraska	2	0	1.000	Won 1996 Fiesta Bowl; Won 1998 Orange Bowl
2	Florida	1	1	.500	Lost 1996 Fiesta Bowl; Won 1997 Sugar Bowl
1	Florida State	0	1	.000	Lost 1997 Sugar Bowl
1	Tennessee	0	1	.000	Lost 1998 Orange Bowl

=== Bowl Alliance appearances by conference ===
Conference	Appearances	W	L	Pct	# Schools	School(s)
Big 12	4	3	1	.750	3	Nebraska (2–0); Kansas State (1–0); Texas (0–1)
ACC	3	2	1	.667	1	Florida State (2–1)
Big East	3	1	2	.333	2	Virginia Tech (1–1); Syracuse (0–1)
SEC	3	1	2	.333	2	Florida (1–1); Tennessee (0–1)
Big Ten	2	1	1	.500	2	Penn State (1–0); Ohio State (0–1)
Big 8	1	1	0	1.000	1	Nebraska (1–0)
Independent	1	0	1	.000	1	Notre Dame (0–1)
SWC	1	0	1	.000	1	Texas (0–1)

=== Bowl Alliance National Championship Game appearances by conference ===
Conference	Appearances	W	L	Pct	# Schools	School(s)
Big 8	1	1	0	1.000	1	Nebraska (1–0)
Big 12	1	1	0	1.000	1	Nebraska (1–0)
SEC	3	1	2	.333	2	Florida (1–1); Tennessee (0–1)
ACC	1	0	1	.000	1	Florida State (0–1)
