= 1996 Temple Owls football team =

American college football season

1996 Temple Owls football
- Conference: Big East Conference
- Record: 1–10 (0–7 Big East)
- Head coach: Ron Dickerson (4th season)
- Offensive coordinator: Nick Gasparsto (4th season)
- Defensive coordinator: Dale Strahm (3rd season)
- Home stadium: Veterans Stadium

1996 Big East Conference football standings
	Conf.			Overall
Team	W		L	W		L
No. 13 Virginia Tech +	6	–	1	10	–	2
No. 14 Miami (FL) +	6	–	1	9	–	3
No. 21 Syracuse +	6	–	1	9	–	3
West Virginia	4	–	3	8	–	4
Pittsburgh	3	–	4	4	–	7
Boston College	2	–	5	5	–	7
Rutgers	1	–	6	2	–	9
Temple	0	–	7	1	–	10
+ – Conference co-champions; Rankings from AP Poll

The 1996 Temple Owls football team represented Temple University as a member of the Big East Conference during the 1996 NCAA Division I-A football season. Led by fourth-year head coach Ron Dickerson, the Owls compiled an overall record of 1–10 with a mark of 0–7 in conference play, placing last out of eight teams in the Big East. Temple played home games at Veterans Stadium in Philadelphia.

== Schedule ==
Date	Time	Opponent	Site	Result	Attendance	Source
August 31		at Eastern Michigan*	Rynearson Stadium; Ypsilanti, MI	W 28–24		
September 7		Washington State*	Franklin Field; Philadelphia, PA	L 34–38	10,169	
September 14		at Bowling Green*	Doyt Perry Stadium; Bowling Green, OH	L 16–20		
September 21	12:00 p.m.	vs. No. 5 Penn State*	Giants Stadium; East Rutherford, NJ	L 0–41	24,847	
October 5		at Pittsburgh	Pitt Stadium; Pittsburgh, PA	L 52–53	30,054	
October 12	1:00 p.m.	at Virginia Tech	Lane Stadium; Blacksburg, VA	L 0–38	44,208	
October 19	1:30 p.m.	No. 15 West Virginia	Veterans Stadium; Philadelphia, PA	L 10–30	12,546	
October 26		at Rutgers	Rutgers Stadium; Piscataway, NJ	L 17–28		
November 2	12:00 p.m.	No. 22 Miami (FL)	Veterans Stadium; Philadelphia, PA	L 26–57	8,608	
November 16		at Boston College	Alumni Stadium; Chestnut Hill, MA	L 20–21		
November 23	12:00 p.m.	No. 16 Syracuse	Veterans Stadium; Philadelphia, PA	L 15–36	4,312	
*Non-conference game; Rankings from AP Poll released prior to the game

== Roster ==
1996 Temple Owls football team roster
Players
Coaches
Offense

Pos.	#	Name	Class
FB	44	Jason Alisauckas	So
QB	5	Charles Andrews	Fr
QB	14	Henry Burris	Sr
WR	16	Randy Canzater	Fr
C	60	Kevin Carozza	Sr
FB	2	Frank Carter	Sr
WR	80	Kenyatta Carter	So
OT	69	Roger Chanione	Sr
TE	84	Justin Collins	So

Defense

Pos.	#	Name	Class
CB	31	Lamond Adams	So
LB	28	Gregg Ascolese	So
NT	55	Mario Ayala	So
SS	42	Kobie Barnett	So
DE	7	Steve Simpkins	Jr
LB	94	Alshermond Singleton	Sr
DE	36	Tim Terry	Sr
DE	56	Michael Tripp	So

Special teams

Pos.	#	Name	Class

Head coach

- Ron Dickerson

Coordinators/assistant coaches

Legend

- (C) Team captain
- (S) Suspended
- (I) Ineligible
- Injured
- Redshirt

Roster
