= 1996 Rutgers Scarlet Knights football team =

American college football season

1996 Rutgers Scarlet Knights football
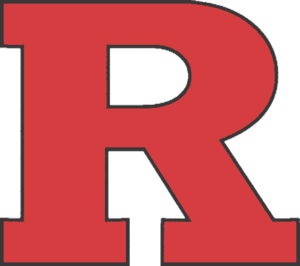
- Conference: Big East Conference
- Record: 2–9 (1–6 Big East)
- Head coach: Terry Shea (1st season)
- Offensive coordinator: Terry Shea (1st season)
- Defensive coordinator: Rod Sharpless (1st season)
- Home stadium: Rutgers Stadium; Giants Stadium

1996 Big East Conference football standings
	Conf.			Overall
Team	W		L	W		L
No. 13 Virginia Tech +	6	–	1	10	–	2
No. 14 Miami (FL) +	6	–	1	9	–	3
No. 21 Syracuse +	6	–	1	9	–	3
West Virginia	4	–	3	8	–	4
Pittsburgh	3	–	4	4	–	7
Boston College	2	–	5	5	–	7
Rutgers	1	–	6	2	–	9
Temple	0	–	7	1	–	10
+ – Conference co-champions; Rankings from AP Poll

The 1996 Rutgers Scarlet Knights football team represented Rutgers University in the 1996 NCAA Division I-A football season. In their first season under head coach Terry Shea, the Scarlet Knights compiled a 2–9 record, were outscored by opponents 380 to 143, and finished in seventh place in the Big East Conference. The team's statistical leaders included Mike Stephans with 918 passing yards, Chad Bosch with 523 rushing yards, and Steven Harper with 321 receiving yards.

== Schedule ==
Date	Time	Opponent	Site	TV	Result	Attendance	Source
August 31		Villanova*	Rutgers Stadium; Piscataway, NJ		W 38–28	27,307	
September 7		Navy*	Rutgers Stadium; Piscataway, NJ		L 6–10		
September 12	8:00 pm	No. 10 Miami (FL)	Rutgers Stadium; Piscataway, NJ	ESPN	L 0–33	29,379	
September 21	12:00 pm	at No. 18 Virginia Tech	Lane Stadium; Blacksburg, VA	ESPN Plus	L 14–30	47,204	
October 5	12:00 pm	at Syracuse	Carrier Dome; Syracuse, NY	ESPN Plus	L 0–42	48,112	
October 12	1:00 pm	Army*	Giants Stadium; East Rutherford, NJ		L 21–42	19,101	
October 19		at Boston College	Alumni Stadium; Chestnut Hill, MA		L 37–13		
October 26		Temple	Rutgers Stadium; Piscataway, NJ		W 28–17		
November 9	12:00 pm	West Virginia	Rutgers Stadium; Piscataway, NJ		L 14–55	21,024	
November 23	1:30 pm	at No. 10 Notre Dame*	Notre Dame Stadium; Notre Dame, IN	NBC	L 0–62	59,075	
November 30	12:00 pm	at Pittsburgh	Pitt Stadium; Pittsburgh, PA		L 9–24	21,772	
*Non-conference game; Rankings from Coaches' Poll released prior to the game; All times are in Eastern time

== Roster ==
1996 Rutgers Scarlet Knights football team roster
Players			Coaches
Offense: Pos. / # / Name / Class; QB / 18 / Darrell Buffington / Sr	Defense: Pos. / # / Name / Class; DB / 10 / Kevin Williams / Jr	Special teams: Pos. / # / Name / Class	Head coach: Terry Shea; Coordinators/assistant coaches Legend: (C) Team captain; (S) Suspended; (I) Ineligible; Injured; Redshirt
