= Phil Clarke (American football) =

American football player (born 1977)

No. 50 and 51
- Position: Linebacker

Personal information
- Born: January 19, 1977 (age 49); Miami, Florida, U.S.

Career information
- College: Pittsburgh
- NFL draft: 1999: undrafted

Career history
- New Orleans Saints (1999–2001)

Career NFL statistics
- Tackles: 57
- Sacks: 1
- Games played: 35
- Stats at Pro Football Reference

Phil Clarke (born January 19, 1977) is an American former professional football player who was a linebacker for the New Orleans Saints of the National Football League (NFL) from 1999 to 2002. He played college football for the Pittsburgh Panthers. He played 35 games in the NFL for the Saints.
