= 1996 Boston College Eagles football team =

American college football season

1996 Boston College Eagles football
- Conference: Big East Conference
- Record: 5–7 (2–5 Big East)
- Head coach: Dan Henning (3rd season)
- Offensive scheme: Pro-style
- Defensive coordinator: Phil Elmassian (1st season)
- Base defense: 4–3
- Captains: Stalin Colinet; Mark Nori; Daryl Porter; Omari Walker
- Home stadium: Alumni Stadium

1996 Big East Conference football standings
	Conf.			Overall
Team	W		L	W		L
No. 13 Virginia Tech +	6	–	1	10	–	2
No. 14 Miami (FL) +	6	–	1	9	–	3
No. 21 Syracuse +	6	–	1	9	–	3
West Virginia	4	–	3	8	–	4
Pittsburgh	3	–	4	4	–	7
Boston College	2	–	5	5	–	7
Rutgers	1	–	6	2	–	9
Temple	0	–	7	1	–	10
+ – Conference co-champions; Rankings from AP Poll

The 1996 Boston College Eagles football team represented Boston College in the 1996 NCAA Division I-A football season. The Eagles were led by third-year head coach Dan Henning, in his final year with the team, and played their home games at Alumni Stadium in Chestnut Hill, Massachusetts. They competed as members of the Big East Conference, finishing sixth with a conference record of 2–5.

== Schedule ==
Date	Time	Opponent	Site	TV	Result	Attendance	Source
August 31		at Hawaii*	Aloha Stadium; Halawa, HI		W 24–21	34,838	
September 14	12:30 p.m.	No. 19 Virginia Tech	Alumni Stadium; Chestnut Hill, MA (rivalry)	ESPN	L 7–45	44,500	
September 21	3:30 p.m.	at No. 8 Michigan*	Michigan Stadium; Ann Arbor, MI	ABC	L 14–20	105,291	
September 28		Navy*	Alumni Stadium; Chestnut Hill, MA		W 43–38	44,500	
October 5	3:30 p.m.	at No. 19 West Virginia	Mountaineer Field; Morgantown, WV	CBS	L 17–34	58,307	
October 12		at Cincinnati*	Nippert Stadium; Cincinnati, OH		W 24–17	20,673	
October 19		Rutgers	Alumni Stadium; Chestnut Hill, MA		W 37–13	44,500	
October 26	12:00 p.m.	Syracuse	Alumni Stadium; Chestnut Hill, MA	CBS	L 17–45	44,500	
October 31	8:00 p.m.	at Pittsburgh	Pitt Stadium; Pittsburgh, PA	ESPN	L 13–20	26,313	
November 9	3:30 p.m.	No. 17 Notre Dame*	Alumni Stadium; Chestnut Hill, MA (Holy War)	CBS	L 21–48	44,500	
November 16		Temple	Alumni Stadium; Chestnut Hill, MA		W 21–20	42,463	
November 23	12:00 p.m.	at No. 25 Miami (FL)	Miami Orange Bowl; Miami, FL	CBS	L 26–43	35,540	
*Non-conference game; Rankings from AP Poll released prior to the game; All times are in Eastern time

== Roster ==
1996 Boston College Eagles football team roster
Players
Coaches
Offense

Pos.	#	Name	Class
OL	74	Doug Brzezinski	So
RB	21	Mike Cloud	So
OL	73	Dan Collins	So
TE	83	Scott Dragos	Jr
QB	7	Matt Hasselbeck	Jr
OL	63	Damien Woody	Fr

Defense

Pos.	#	Name	Class
LB	44	Frank Chamberlin	Fr
DE	99	Stalin Colinet	Sr
DT	95	Chris Hovan	Fr
DL	88	Adam Newman	Fr
DB	44	Daryl Porter	Sr

Special teams

Pos.	#	Name	Class

Head coach

- Dan Henning

Coordinators/assistant coaches

Legend

- (C) Team captain
- (S) Suspended
- (I) Ineligible
- Injured
- Redshirt
