= 1996 North Carolina Tar Heels football team =

American college football season

1996 North Carolina Tar Heels football

Gator Bowl champion

Gator Bowl, W 20–13 vs. West Virginia
- Conference: Atlantic Coast Conference

Ranking
- Coaches: No. 10
- AP: No. 10
- Record: 10–2 (6–2 ACC)
- Head coach: Mack Brown (9th season)
- Offensive coordinator: Greg Davis (1st season)
- Offensive scheme: Multiple
- Defensive coordinator: Carl Torbush (9th season)
- Base defense: 4–3
- Captains: Greg Ellis; James Hamilton; Leon Johnson; Freddie Jones; Chris Keldorf; Jeff Saturday; Brian Simmons; Rick Terry
- Home stadium: Kenan Memorial Stadium

1996 Atlantic Coast Conference football standings
| | Conf. | | | Overall |
| Team | W | | L | W | | L |
|---|---|---|---|---|---|---|
| No. 3 Florida State $ | 8 | – | 0 | 11 | – | 1 |
| No. 10 North Carolina | 6 | – | 2 | 10 | – | 2 |
| Clemson | 6 | – | 2 | 7 | – | 5 |
| Virginia | 5 | – | 3 | 7 | – | 5 |
| Georgia Tech | 4 | – | 4 | 5 | – | 6 |
| Maryland | 3 | – | 5 | 5 | – | 6 |
| NC State | 3 | – | 5 | 3 | – | 8 |
| Wake Forest | 1 | – | 7 | 3 | – | 8 |
| Duke | 0 | – | 8 | 0 | – | 11 |
$ – Conference champion; Rankings from AP Poll

The 1996 North Carolina Tar Heels football team represented the University of North Carolina at Chapel Hill during the 1996 NCAA Division I-A football season. The Tar Heels played their home games at Kenan Memorial Stadium in Chapel Hill, North Carolina and competed in the Atlantic Coast Conference. The team was led by head coach Mack Brown.

== Schedule ==
| Date | Time | Opponent | Rank | Site | TV | Result | Attendance | Source |
|---|---|---|---|---|---|---|---|---|
| August 31 | 3:30 p.m. | Clemson | | Kenan Memorial Stadium; Chapel Hill, NC | ABC | W 45–0 | 47,500 | |
| September 7 | 6:00 p.m. | at No. 9 Syracuse* | No. 24 | Carrier Dome; Syracuse, NY | ESPN2 | W 27–10 | 48,097 | |
| September 21 | 3:30 p.m. | Georgia Tech | No. 11 | Kenan Memorial Stadium; Chapel Hill, NC | ABC | W 16–0 | 50,000 | |
| September 28 | 3:30 p.m. | at No. 2 Florida State | No. 11 | Doak Campbell Stadium; Tallahassee, FL | ABC | L 0–13 | 80,120 | |
| October 5 | 6:30 p.m. | at Wake Forest | No. 15 | Groves Stadium; Winston-Salem, NC (rivalry) | | W 45–6 | 25,681 | |
| October 12 | 7:00 p.m. | Maryland | No. 13 | Kenan Memorial Stadium; Chapel Hill, NC | ESPN2 | W 38–7 | 47,500 | |
| October 26 | 6:30 p.m. | at Houston* | No. 9 | Houston Astrodome; Houston, TX | | W 42–14 | 16,850 | |
| November 2 | 12:00 p.m. | NC State | No. 8 | Kenan Memorial Stadium; Chapel Hill, NC (rivalry) | JPS | W 52–20 | 47,000 | |
| November 9 | 1:30 p.m. | Louisville* | No. 8 | Kenan Memorial Stadium; Chapel Hill, NC | | W 28–10 | 46,000 | |
| November 16 | 3:30 p.m. | at No. 24 Virginia | No. 6 | Scott Stadium; Charlottesville, VA (South's Oldest Rivalry) | ABC | L 17–20 | 42,500 | |
| November 23 | 12:00 p.m. | at Duke | No. 13 | Wallace Wade Stadium; Durham, NC (Victory Bell) | JPS | W 27–10 | 30,264 | |
| January 1, 1997 | 12:30 p.m. | vs. No. 25 West Virginia* | No. 12 | Jacksonville Municipal Stadium; Jacksonville, FL (Gator Bowl) | NBC | W 20–13 | 52,103 | |
*Non-conference game; Rankings from AP Poll released prior to the game; All times are in Eastern time

== Rankings ==
Ranking movements Legend: ██ Increase in ranking ██ Decrease in ranking — = Not ranked т = Tied with team above or below
| | Week | | | | | | | | | | | | | | | | | |
| Poll | Pre | 1 | 2 | 3 | 4 | 5 | 6 | 7 | 8 | 9 | 10 | 11 | 12 | 13 | 14 | 15 | 16 | Final |
|---|---|---|---|---|---|---|---|---|---|---|---|---|---|---|---|---|---|---|
| AP | — | — | 24 | 12 | 11 | 11 | 15 | 13 | 11 | 9 | 8 | 8 | 6т | 13 | 13 | 13 | 12 | 10 |
| Coaches | — | | 22 | 13 | 13 | 11 | 17 | 14 | 11 | 9 | 8 | 8 | 7 | 14 | 14 | 14 | 13 | 10 |

== Roster ==
1996 North Carolina Tar Heels football team roster
Players
Coaches
Offense

| Pos. | # | Name | Class |
|---|---|---|---|
| WR | 4 | Ocatvus Barnes | Jr |
| FB | 6 | Chris Watson | Sr |
| TB | 12 | Leon Johnson | Sr |
| QB | 15 | Chris Keldorf | Jr |
| WR | 18 | Na Brown | So |
| WR | 23 | LC Stevens | So |
| RB | 27 | Jonathan Linton | Jr |
| OT | 51 | Mike Baxter | Jr |
| G | 63 | Mike Hobgood | Jr |
| C | 64 | Jeff Saturday | Jr |
| G | 74 | Jerness Gethers | Sr |
| OT | 75 | Byron Thomas | Sr |
| TE | 86 | Ebenezer Ekuban | So |
| TE | 92 | Freddie Jones | Sr |

Defense

| Pos. | # | Name | Class |
|---|---|---|---|
| S | 2 | Omar Brown | Jr |
| S | 3 | Greg Williams | Jr |
| LB | 9 | Keith Newman | So |
| CB | 29 | Robert Williams | So |
| CB | 31 | Dré Bly | Fr |
| LB | 41 | Brian Simmons | Jr |
| LB | 53 | Kivuusama Mays | Jr |
| LB | 54 | James Hamilton | Sr |
| DT | 70 | Andre Purvis | Sr |
| DT | 84 | Nate Hobgood-Chittick | Jr |
| DT | 85 | Chris Mintz | Fr |
| DE | 87 | Greg Ellis | Jr |
| DT | 90 | Vonnie Holliday | Jr |
| DE | 91 | Mike Pringley | So |
| DT | 94 | Rick Terry | Sr |
| DE | 96 | Russell Davis | So |

Special teams

| Pos. | # | Name | Class |
|---|---|---|---|
| P | 40 | David Secrest | Sr |

Head coach

- Mack Brown

Coordinators/assistant coaches

Legend

- (C) Team captain
- (S) Suspended
- (I) Ineligible
- Injured
- Redshirt

Roster
