= 1996 Florida State Seminoles football team =

American college football season

1996 Florida State Seminoles football

ACC champion

Sugar Bowl (BA NCG), L 20–52 vs. Florida
- Conference: Atlantic Coast Conference

Ranking
- Coaches: No. 3
- AP: No. 3
- Record: 11–1 (8–0 ACC)
- Head coach: Bobby Bowden (21st season)
- Offensive coordinator: Mark Richt (3rd season)
- Offensive scheme: Pro-style
- Defensive coordinator: Mickey Andrews (13th season)
- Base defense: 4–3
- Captains: Todd Fordham; Scott Bentley; Reinard Wilson
- Home stadium: Doak Campbell Stadium

1996 Atlantic Coast Conference football standings
	Conf.			Overall
Team	W		L	W		L
No. 3 Florida State $	8	–	0	11	–	1
No. 10 North Carolina	6	–	2	10	–	2
Clemson	6	–	2	7	–	5
Virginia	5	–	3	7	–	5
Georgia Tech	4	–	4	5	–	6
Maryland	3	–	5	5	–	6
NC State	3	–	5	3	–	8
Wake Forest	1	–	7	3	–	8
Duke	0	–	8	0	–	11
$ – Conference champion; Rankings from AP Poll

The 1996 Florida State Seminoles football team represented the Florida State University as a member of the Atlantic Coast Conference (ACC) during the 1996 NCAA Division I-A football season. Led by 21st-year head coach Bobby Bowden, the Seminoles compiled an overall record of 11–1 with a mark of 8–0 in conference play, winning the ACC title. Florida State was invited to the Sugar Bowl, the Bowl Alliance's national championship game, where the Seminoles lost to Florida. The team played home games at Doak Campbell Stadium in Tallahassee, Florida.

Florida State was selected as the national champion by Alderson. Florida State completed just their third undefeated regular season, and for the second straight season running back Warrick Dunn was a Heisman Trophy finalist.

== Schedule ==
Date	Time	Opponent	Rank	Site	TV	Result	Attendance	Source
September 7	3:30 p.m.	Duke	No. 3	Doak Campbell Stadium; Tallahassee, FL	ABC	W 44–7	80,032	
September 19	8:00 p.m.	at NC State	No. 3	Carter–Finley Stadium; Raleigh, NC	ESPN	W 51–17	45,700	
September 28	3:30 p.m.	No. 11 North Carolina	No. 2	Doak Campbell Stadium; Tallahassee, FL	ABC	W 13–0	80,120	
October 5	7:00 p.m.	Clemson	No. 2	Doak Campbell Stadium; Tallahassee, FL (rivalry)	ESPN	W 34–3	76,360	
October 12	3:30 p.m.	at No. 6 Miami (FL)*	No. 3	Miami Orange Bowl; Miami, FL (rivalry)	CBS	W 34–16	75,913	
October 26	3:30 p.m.	No. 14 Virginia^{†}	No. 3	Doak Campbell Stadium; Tallahassee, FL (Jefferson–Eppes Trophy)	ABC	W 31–24	80,237	
November 2	7:00 p.m.	at Georgia Tech	No. 3	Bobby Dodd Stadium; Atlanta, GA	ESPN	W 49–3	46,311	
November 9	12:00 p.m.	vs. Wake Forest	No. 3	Florida Citrus Bowl; Orlando, FL (Dowdy Aviation Classic)	JPS	W 44–7	34,974	
November 16	7:00 p.m.	No. 25 Southern Miss*	No. 3	Doak Campbell Stadium; Tallahassee, FL	ESPN	W 54–14	77,280	
November 23	3:30 p.m.	vs. Maryland	No. 3	Pro Player Stadium; Miami Gardens, FL	ABC	W 48–10	31,989	
November 30	12:00 p.m.	No. 1 Florida*	No. 2	Doak Campbell Stadium; Tallahassee, FL (rivalry, College GameDay)	ABC	W 24–21	80,932	
January 2	8:00 p.m.	vs. No. 3 Florida*	No. 1	Louisiana Superdome; New Orleans, LA (Sugar Bowl, College GameDay)	ABC	L 20–52	78,344	
*Non-conference game; ^{†}Homecoming; Rankings from AP Poll released prior to the game; All times are in Eastern time; Source:

== Rankings ==
Ranking movements Legend: ██ Increase in ranking ██ Decrease in ranking ( ) = First-place votes
	Week																	
Poll	Pre	1	2	3	4	5	6	7	8	9	10	11	12	13	14	15	16	Final
AP	3 (5)	3 (5)	3 (5)	3 (3)	3 (4)	2 (13)	2 (8)	3 (4)	3 (5)	3 (5)	3 (3)	3 (2)	3 (2)	3 (4)	2 (5)	1 (61)	1 (62)	3
Coaches	3 (6)		3 (3)	3 (1)	3 (1)	2 (22)	2 (9)	3 (6)	2 (7)	2 (5)	2 (5)	2 (5)	3 (8)	3 (7)	2 (7)	1 (56)	1 (57)	3

== Roster ==
1996 Florida State Seminoles football team roster
Players
Coaches
Offense

Pos.	#	Name	Class
WR	1	Andre Cooper	Sr
WR	9	Peter Warrick	Fr
QB	12	Thad Busby	Jr
WR	19	E. G. Green	Jr
RB	28	Warrick Dunn	Sr
OT	70	Tra Thomas	Jr
OT	71	Todd Fordham	Sr
OT	76	Walter Jones	Jr

Defense

Pos.	#	Name	Class
CB	2	Samari Rolle	Jr
CB	11	Dexter Jackson	So
CB	15	Mario Edwards	So
FS	16	Sean Key	So
CB	20	James Colzie	Sr
LB	40	Lamont Green	So
LB	45	Henri Crockett	Sr
LB	47	Vernon Crawford	Sr
DL	53	Corey Simon	Fr
DE	55	Reinard Wilson	Sr
LB	56	Sam Cowart	Sr
DE	58	Peter Boulware	Jr
DL	85	Andre Wadsworth	Jr
DE	90	Greg Spires	Jr

Special teams

Pos.	#	Name	Class
K	3	Scott Bentley	Sr
K	29	Bill Gramatica	Fr

Head coach

- Bobby Bowden

Coordinators/assistant coaches

Legend

- (C) Team captain
- (S) Suspended
- (I) Ineligible
- Injured
- Redshirt

Roster

== 1997 NFL draft ==
The following Seminoles were selected in the 1997 NFL draft, including four players taken in the first 14 picks.

Player	Position	Round	Overall	NFL team
Peter Boulware	Linebacker	1	4	Baltimore Ravens
Walter Jones	Offensive tackle	1	6	Seattle Seahawks
Warrick Dunn	Running back	1	12	Tampa Bay Buccaneers
Reinard Wilson	Linebacker	1	14	Cincinnati Bengals
Henri Crockett	Linebacker	4	100	Atlanta Falcons
Vernon Crawford	Linebacker	5	159	New England Patriots
Byron Capers	Cornerback	7	225	Philadelphia Eagles
