= 1996 Miami Hurricanes football team =

American college football season

1996 Miami Hurricanes football

Big East co-champion Carquest Bowl champion

Carquest Bowl, W 31–21 vs. Virginia
- Conference: Big East Conference

Ranking
- Coaches: No. 14
- AP: No. 14
- Record: 9–3 (6–1 Big East)
- Head coach: Butch Davis (2nd season)
- Offensive coordinator: Larry Coker (2nd season)
- Defensive coordinator: Bill Miller (2nd season)
- MVP: Tremain Mack
- Home stadium: Miami Orange Bowl

1996 Big East Conference football standings
	Conf.			Overall
Team	W		L	W		L
No. 13 Virginia Tech +	6	–	1	10	–	2
No. 14 Miami (FL) +	6	–	1	9	–	3
No. 21 Syracuse +	6	–	1	9	–	3
West Virginia	4	–	3	8	–	4
Pittsburgh	3	–	4	4	–	7
Boston College	2	–	5	5	–	7
Rutgers	1	–	6	2	–	9
Temple	0	–	7	1	–	10
+ – Conference co-champions; Rankings from AP Poll

The 1996 Miami Hurricanes football team represented the University of Miami during the 1996 NCAA Division I-A football season. It was the Hurricanes' 71st season of football and sixth as a member of the Big East Conference. The Hurricanes were led by second-year head coach Butch Davis and played their home games at the Orange Bowl. They finished the season 9–3 overall and 6–1 in the Big East to finish as conference co-champion. They were invited to the Carquest Bowl where they defeated Virginia, 31–21.

== Schedule ==
Date	Time	Opponent	Rank	Site	TV	Result	Attendance	Source
August 31	1:30 pm	at Memphis*	No. 11	Liberty Bowl Memorial Stadium; Memphis, TN	SUN	W 30–7	32,096	
September 7	4:00 pm	The Citadel*	No. 11	Miami Orange Bowl; Miami, FL		W 52–6	35,747	
September 12	8:00 pm	at Rutgers	No. 10	Rutgers Stadium; Piscataway, NJ	ESPN	W 33–0	29,379	
September 28	12:00 pm	Pittsburgh	No. 10	Miami Orange Bowl; Miami, FL	ESPN Plus	W 45–0	32,747	
October 12	3:30 pm	No. 3 Florida State*	No. 6	Miami Orange Bowl; Miami, FL (rivalry)	CBS	L 16–34	75,913	
October 19	7:00 pm	East Carolina*	No. 12	Miami Orange Bowl; Miami, FL	ESPN	L 6–31	31,909	
October 26	7:00 pm	at No. 12 West Virginia	No. 25	Mountaineer Field; Morgantown, WV	ESPN	W 10–7	66,948	
November 2	12:00 pm	at Temple	No. 22	Veterans Stadium; Philadelphia, PA	ESPN Plus	W 57–26	8,608	
November 16	3:30 pm	No. 21 Virginia Tech^{†}	No. 18	Miami Orange Bowl; Miami, FL (rivalry)	CBS	L 7–21	38,814	
November 23	12:00 pm	Boston College	No. 25	Miami Orange Bowl; Miami, FL	CBS	W 43–26	34,540	
November 30	3:30 pm	at No. 16 Syracuse	No. 23	Carrier Dome; Syracuse, NY	CBS	W 38–31	49,426	
December 27	7:30 pm	vs. Virginia*	No. 19	Pro Player Stadium; Miami, FL (Carquest Bowl)	TBS	W 31–21	46,418	
*Non-conference game; ^{†}Homecoming; Rankings from AP Poll released prior to the game; All times are in Eastern time

== Rankings ==
Ranking movements Legend: ██ Increase in ranking ██ Decrease in ranking
	Week																	
Poll	Pre	1	2	3	4	5	6	7	8	9	10	11	12	13	14	15	16	Final
AP	12	11	11	10	10	10	8	6	12	25	22	21	18	25	23	19	19	14
Coaches	16		12	11	10	9	8	6	13	23	22	21	18	25	23	20	19	14

== Personnel ==
=== Coaching staff ===
Name	Position	Seasons	Alma mater
Butch Davis	Head coach	2nd	Arkansas (1973)
Larry Coker	Offensive coordinator/quarterbacks	2nd	Northeastern State (OK) (1970)
Bill Miller	Defensive coordinator	2nd	Texas-Arlington (1978)
Rob Chudzinski	Tight ends	1st	Miami (1990)
Chuck Pagano	Defensive backs	2nd	Wyoming (1984)
Greg Mark	Defensive line	1st	Miami (1991)
Art Kehoe	offensive line	12th	Miami (1982)
Don Soldinger	Running backs	7th	Memphis (1967)
Randy Shannon	Linebackers	5th	Miami (1989)
Curtis Johnson	Wide receivers	1st	Idaho (1985)

=== Support staff ===
Name	Position	Seasons	Alma mater
Dale Hulett	Strength & Conditioning	2nd	SUNY-Cortland (1978)
Bobby Harden	Graduate Assistant	1st	Miami (1989)
Howie DeCristofaro	Graduate Assistant	1st	Florida (1980)

=== Roster ===
1996 Miami Hurricanes football team roster
Players
Coaches
Offense

Pos.	#	Name	Class
WR	7	Jammi German	Jr
QB	11	Scott Covington	So
QB	16	Ryan Clement	Jr
RB	32	Edgerrin James	Fr
C	63	K.C. Jones	Sr
C	64	Ty Wise	Fr
WR	87	Yatil Green	Jr

Defense

Pos.	#	Name	Class
SS	3	Tremain Mack	Jr
CB	4	Earl Little	Sr
DB	23	Duane Starks	Jr
LB	31	Nelson Rodriguez	Jr
LB	45	Twan Russell	Sr
LB	52	Nate Webster	Fr
DE	90	Kenny Holmes	Sr

Special teams

Pos.	#	Name	Class

Head coach

- Butch Davis

Coordinators/assistant coaches

Legend

- (C) Team captain
- (S) Suspended
- (I) Ineligible
- Injured
- Redshirt

Roster

== Statistics ==
=== Passing ===
Player	Cmp	Att	Pct	Yards	TD	INT
Ryan Clement	164	272	60.3	2,257	19	8
Scott Covington	73	125	58.4	919	4	4

=== Rushing ===
Player	Att	Yards	Avg	TD
Dyral McMillan	111	565	5.1	4
Danyell Ferguson	81	385	4.4	3
Trent Jones	86	374	4.3	5
Edgerrin James	71	446	6.3	2
Ryan Clement	36	-142	-3.9	1
Nick Williams	17	67	3.9	1
Scott Covington	13	-30	-2.3	1
Carlo Joseph	12	47	3.9	1
James Jackson	8	22	2.8	0
Magic Benton	1	22	22.0	0
Bryan Bippen	1	2	2.0	0
Tony Gaiter	1	-1	-1.0	0

=== Receiving ===
Player	Rec	Yards	Avg	TD
Yatil Green	44	746	17.0	4
Magic Benton	38	574	14.4	4
Tony Gaiter	30	671	22.4	7
Gerard Daphnis	19	173	9.1	0
Trent Jones	17	94	5.5	0
Jermaine Chambers	14	188	13.4	1
Nick Williams	12	149	12.4	1
Chris C. Jones	12	159	13.3	4
Mondriel Fulcher	12	149	12.4	2
Danyell Ferguson	11	52	4.7	0
Carlo Joseph	11	87	7.9	0
Dyral McMillan	8	44	5.5	0
Edgerrin James	6	90	15.0	0
James Jackson	1	7	7.0	0
Andy Atrio	1	12	12.0	0
Jeff Popovich	1	8	8.0	0
