= 1996 West Virginia Mountaineers football team =

American college football season

1996 West Virginia Mountaineers football

Gator Bowl, L 13–20 vs. North Carolina
- Conference: Big East Conference
- Record: 8–4 (4–3 Big East)
- Head coach: Don Nehlen (17th season)
- Offensive coordinator: Dan Simrell (2nd season)
- Defensive coordinator: Steve Dunlap (5th season)
- Home stadium: Mountaineer Field

1996 Big East Conference football standings
	Conf.			Overall
Team	W		L	W		L
No. 13 Virginia Tech +	6	–	1	10	–	2
No. 14 Miami (FL) +	6	–	1	9	–	3
No. 21 Syracuse +	6	–	1	9	–	3
West Virginia	4	–	3	8	–	4
Pittsburgh	3	–	4	4	–	7
Boston College	2	–	5	5	–	7
Rutgers	1	–	6	2	–	9
Temple	0	–	7	1	–	10
+ – Conference co-champions; Rankings from AP Poll

The 1996 West Virginia Mountaineers football team represented West Virginia University as a member of the Big East Conference during the 1996 NCAA Division I-A football season. Led by 17th-year head coach Don Nehlen, the Mountaineers compiled an overall record of 8–4 with a mark of 4–3 in conference play, placing fourth in the Big East. West Virginia was invited to the Gator Bowl, where the Mountaineers lost to North Carolina. The team played home games at Mountaineer Field in Morgantown, West Virginia.

== Schedule ==
Date	Time	Opponent	Rank	Site	TV	Result	Attendance	Source
August 31	7:30 p.m.	at Pittsburgh		Pitt Stadium; Pittsburgh, PA (Backyard Brawl)	ESPN	W 34–0	54,612	
September 7	12:00 p.m.	Western Michigan*		Mountaineer Field; Morgantown, WV	ESPN	W 34–9	47,938	
September 14	12:00 p.m.	East Carolina*		Mountaineer Field; Morgantown, WV	ESPN Plus	W 10–9	50,129	
September 21	7:00 p.m.	at Purdue*		Ross–Ade Stadium; West Lafayette, IN		W 20–6	40,642	
September 28	6:00 p.m.	Maryland*	No. 23	Mountaineer Field; Morgantown, WV (rivalry)	ESPN2	W 13–0	54,542	
October 5	3:30 p.m.	Boston College	No. 19	Mountaineer Field; Morgantown, WV	CBS	W 34–17	58,307	
October 19	1:30 p.m.	at Temple	No. 15	Veterans Stadium; Philadelphia, PA		W 30–10	12,546	
October 26	7:00 p.m.	No. 25 Miami (FL)	No. 12	Mountaineer Field; Morgantown, WV	ESPN	L 7–10	66,948	
November 2	3:30 p.m.	Syracuse	No. 18	Mountaineer Field; Morgantown, WV (rivalry)	CBS	L 7–30	56,312	
November 9	12:00 p.m.	at Rutgers		Rutgers Stadium; Piscataway, NJ		W 55–14	21,024	
November 23	12:00 p.m.	at No. 17 Virginia Tech	No. 23	Lane Stadium; Blacksburg, VA (rivalry)	ESPN2	L 14–31	50,086	
January 1	12:30 p.m.	vs. No. 12 North Carolina*	No. 25	Jacksonville Municipal Stadium; Jacksonville, FL (Gator Bowl)	NBC	L 13–20	52,103	
*Non-conference game; Rankings from AP Poll released prior to the game; All times are in Eastern time

== Rankings ==
Ranking movements Legend: ██ Increase in ranking ██ Decrease in ranking — = Not ranked
	Week																	
Poll	Pre	1	2	3	4	5	6	7	8	9	10	11	12	13	14	15	16	Final
AP	—	—	—	—	—	23	19	17	15	12	18	—	—	23	25	24	25	—
Coaches	—		—	—	—	23	19	15	14	11	17	—	24	21	25	24	25	—

== Roster ==
1996 West Virginia Mountaineers football team roster
Players
Coaches
Offense

Pos.	#	Name	Class
QB	8	Chad Johnston	Sr
QB	10	Marc Bulger	Fr
QB	17	Ja'Juan Seider	Fr
RB	20	Amos Zereoue	Fr
TE	82	Anthony Becht	Fr

Defense

Pos.	#	Name	Class
DB	23	Mike Logan	Sr
LB	57	Gary Stills	So
DT	78	Henry Slay	Jr
LB	91	Bernard Russ	Sr
DT	92	John Thornton	So
LB	98	Kevin Landolt	So

Special teams

Pos.	#	Name	Class

Head coach

- Don Nehlen

Coordinators/assistant coaches

Legend

- (C) Team captain
- (S) Suspended
- (I) Ineligible
- Injured
- Redshirt
