= 1996 Virginia Tech Hokies football team =

American college football season

1996 Virginia Tech Hokies football

Big East co-champion

Orange Bowl, L 21–41 vs. Nebraska
- Conference: Big East Conference

Ranking
- Coaches: No. 12
- AP: No. 13
- Record: 10–2 (6–1 Big East)
- Head coach: Frank Beamer (10th season)
- Offensive coordinator: Rickey Bustle (3rd season)
- Offensive scheme: Multiple
- Defensive coordinator: Bud Foster (2nd season)
- Base defense: 4–4
- Home stadium: Lane Stadium

1996 Big East Conference football standings
	Conf.			Overall
Team	W		L	W		L
No. 13 Virginia Tech +	6	–	1	10	–	2
No. 14 Miami (FL) +	6	–	1	9	–	3
No. 21 Syracuse +	6	–	1	9	–	3
West Virginia	4	–	3	8	–	4
Pittsburgh	3	–	4	4	–	7
Boston College	2	–	5	5	–	7
Rutgers	1	–	6	2	–	9
Temple	0	–	7	1	–	10
+ – Conference co-champions; Rankings from AP Poll

The 1996 Virginia Tech Hokies football team represented Virginia Tech (formally the Virginia Polytechnic Institute and State University) as a member of the Big East Conference during the 1996 NCAA Division I-A football season. Led by 10th-year head coach Frank Beamer, the Hokies compiled an overall record of 10–2, with a mark of 6–1 in conference play, finished as Big East co-champion, and lost the Orange Bowl against Nebraska. Virginia Tech played home games at Lane Stadium in Blacksburg, Virginia.

== Schedule ==
Date	Time	Opponent	Rank	Site	TV	Result	Attendance	Source
September 7	7:00 p.m.	at Akron*	No. 15	Rubber Bowl; Akron, OH		W 21–18	12,293	
September 14	12:30 p.m.	at Boston College	No. 19	Alumni Stadium; Chestnut Hill, MA (rivalry)	ESPN	W 45–7	44,500	
September 21	12:00 p.m.	Rutgers	No. 18	Lane Stadium; Blacksburg, VA	ESPN Plus	W 30–14	47,204	
September 28	3:30 p.m.	at Syracuse	No. 18	Carrier Dome; Syracuse, NY	CBS	L 21–52	49,069	
October 12	1:00 p.m.	Temple^{†}		Lane Stadium; Blacksburg, VA		W 38–0	44,208	
October 26	12:00 p.m.	Pittsburgh		Lane Stadium; Blacksburg, VA	ESPN Plus	W 34–17	43,625	
November 2	1:00 p.m.	Southwestern Louisiana*		Lane Stadium; Blacksburg, VA		W 47–16	35,643	
November 9	4:00 p.m.	East Carolina*	No. 25	Lane Stadium; Blacksburg, VA	ESPN2	W 35–14	49,128	
November 16	3:30 p.m.	at No. 18 Miami (FL)	No. 21	Miami Orange Bowl; Miami, FL (rivalry)	CBS	W 21–7	38,814	
November 23	12:00 p.m.	No. 23 West Virginia	No. 17	Lane Stadium; Blacksburg, VA (rivalry)	ESPN2	W 31–14	50,086	
November 29	2:30 p.m.	No. 20 Virginia*	No. 17	Lane Stadium; Blacksburg, VA (Commonwealth Cup)	CBS	W 26–9	50,128	
December 31	7:00 p.m.	vs. No. 6 Nebraska*	No. 10	Pro Player Stadium; Miami Gardens, FL (Orange Bowl)	CBS	L 21–41	51,212	
*Non-conference game; ^{†}Homecoming; Rankings from AP Poll released prior to the game; All times are in Eastern time

== Rankings ==
Ranking movements Legend: ██ Increase in ranking ██ Decrease in ranking — = Not ranked
	Week																	
Poll	Pre	1	2	3	4	5	6	7	8	9	10	11	12	13	14	15	16	Final
AP	16	14	15	19	18	18	—	—	—	—	—	25	21	17	17	15	10	13
Coaches Poll	15		14	19	16	16	22	23	23	21	20	17	13	9	9	9	9	12

== Roster ==
1996 Virginia Tech Hokies football team roster
Players
Coaches
Offense

Pos.	#	Name	Class
C	63	Bill Conaty	Sr
G	64	Gennaro DiNapoli	Jr
QB	16	Jim Druckenmiller	Sr
TE	81	Bryan Jennings	Sr
RB	28	Ken Oxendine	Jr
G	57	Dwight Vick	So
C	72	Tim Wade	Sr
OT	76	T.J. Washington	Sr
G	75	Todd Washington	Jr

Defense

Pos.	#	Name	Class
CB	9	Antonio Banks	Jr
DE	58	Cornell Brown	Sr
FS	1	Keion Carpenter	So
S	14	Torrian Gray	Sr
CB	20	Pierson Prioleau	So

Special teams

Pos.	#	Name	Class
P	3	John Thomas	So

Head coach

- Frank Beamer

Coordinators/assistant coaches

Legend

- (C) Team captain
- (S) Suspended
- (I) Ineligible
- Injured
- Redshirt

Roster
Last update: 1997-07-08

== Team players in the NFL ==
Player	Position	Round	Pick	NFL club
Jim Druckenmiller	Quarterback	1	26	San Francisco 49ers
Torrian Gray	Safety	2	49	Minnesota Vikings
Antonio Banks	Cornerback	4	113	Minnesota Vikings
Cornell Brown	Outside Linebacker	6	194	Baltimore Ravens
