= 1996 Syracuse Orangemen football team =

American college football season

1996 Syracuse Orangemen football

Big East co-champion Liberty Bowl champion

Liberty Bowl, W 30–17 vs. Houston
- Conference: Big East Conference

Ranking
- Coaches: No. 19
- AP: No. 21
- Record: 9–3 (6–1 Big East)
- Head coach: Paul Pasqualoni (6th season)
- Offensive coordinator: George DeLeone (10th season)
- Defensive coordinator: Norm Gerber (13th season)
- Captains: Kevin Abrams; Harvey Pennypacker; Malcolm Thomas
- Home stadium: Carrier Dome

1996 Big East Conference football standings
	Conf.			Overall
Team	W		L	W		L
No. 13 Virginia Tech +	6	–	1	10	–	2
No. 14 Miami (FL) +	6	–	1	9	–	3
No. 21 Syracuse +	6	–	1	9	–	3
West Virginia	4	–	3	8	–	4
Pittsburgh	3	–	4	4	–	7
Boston College	2	–	5	5	–	7
Rutgers	1	–	6	2	–	9
Temple	0	–	7	1	–	10
+ – Conference co-champions; Rankings from AP Poll

The 1996 Syracuse Orangemen football team represented Syracuse University as a member of the Big East Conference during the 1996 NCAA Division I-A football season. Led by sixth-year head coach Paul Pasqualoni, the Orangemen compiled an overall record of 9–3 with a mark of 6–1 in conference play, sharing the Big East title with the Miami Hurricanes and the Virginia Tech Hokies. Syracuse was invited to the Liberty Bowl, where the Orangemen defeated Houston. The team played home games at the Carrier Dome in Syracuse, New York.

== Schedule ==
Date	Time	Opponent	Rank	Site	TV	Result	Attendance	Source
September 7	6:00 pm	No. 24 North Carolina*	No. 9	Carrier Dome; Syracuse, NY	ESPN2	L 10–27	48,097	
September 21	7:30 pm	at Minnesota*	No. 23	Hubert H. Humphrey Metrodome; Minneapolis, MN	ESPN2	L 33–35	45,756	
September 28	3:30 pm	No. 18 Virginia Tech		Carrier Dome; Syracuse, NY	CBS	W 52–21	49,069	
October 5	12:00 pm	Rutgers		Carrier Dome; Syracuse, NY	ESPN Plus	W 42–0	48,112	
October 12	12:00 pm	Pittsburgh		Carrier Dome; Syracuse, NY (rivalry)	ESPN Plus	W 55–7	45,103	
October 26	12:00 pm	at Boston College		Alumni Stadium; Chestnut Hill, MA	CBS	W 45–17	44,500	
November 2	3:30 pm	at No. 18 West Virginia		Mountaineer Field; Morgantown, WV (rivalry)	CBS	W 30–7	56,312	
November 9	3:30 pm	at Tulane*	No. 24	Louisiana Superdome; New Orleans, LA		W 31–7	13,537	
November 16	6:00 pm	No. 22 Army*	No. 19	Carrier Dome; Syracuse, NY	ESPN	W 42–17	49,257	
November 23	12:00 pm	at Temple	No. 16	Veterans Stadium; Philadelphia, PA	ESPN Plus	W 36–15	4,312	
November 30	3:30 pm	No. 23 Miami (FL)	No. 16	Carrier Dome; Syracuse, NY	CBS	L 31–38	49,426	
December 27	3:00 pm	vs. Houston*	No. 23	Liberty Bowl Memorial Stadium; Memphis, TN (Liberty Bowl)	ESPN	W 30–17	49,163	
*Non-conference game; Rankings from AP Poll released prior to the game; All times are in Eastern time

== Rankings ==
Ranking movements Legend: ██ Increase in ranking ██ Decrease in ranking — = Not ranked
	Week																	
Poll	Pre	1	2	3	4	5	6	7	8	9	10	11	12	13	14	15	16	Final
AP	10	10	9	23	23	—	—	—	—	—	—	24	19	16	16	22	23	21
Coaches	13		11	24	24	—	—	—	—	—	—	23	19	17	17	22	22	19

== Roster ==
1996 Syracuse Orangemen football team roster
Players
Coaches
Offense

Pos.	#	Name	Class
WR	12	Kevin Johnson	So
FB	44	Rob Konrad	So
QB	5	Donovan McNabb	So

Defense

Pos.	#	Name	Class
DB	4	Kevin Abrams	Sr
LB	26	Mike Brown	Sr
LB	41	Nate Hemsley	Sr

Special teams

Pos.	#	Name	Class

Head coach

- Paul Pasqualoni

Coordinators/assistant coaches

Legend

- (C) Team captain
- (S) Suspended
- (I) Ineligible
- Injured
- Redshirt

Roster
