= 1996 NCAA Division I-A football rankings =

- Season: 1996
- Bowl season: 1996–97 bowl games
- Preseason No. 1: Nebraska
- End of season champions: Florida
- Conference with most teams in final AP poll: Big Ten, SEC (5)

Two human polls comprised the 1996 National Collegiate Athletic Association (NCAA) Division I-A football rankings. Unlike most sports, college football's governing body, the NCAA, does not bestow a national championship, instead that title is bestowed by one or more different polling agencies. There are two main weekly polls that begin in the preseason—the AP Poll and the Coaches Poll.

== Legend ==
	Increase in ranking
	Decrease in ranking
	Not ranked previous week
	National champion
(#–#)	Win–loss record
(Italics)	Number of first place votes
т	Tied with team above or below also with this symbol

== AP Poll ==
	Preseason Aug 12	Week 1 Aug 26	Week 2 Sep 2	Week 3 Sep 9	Week 4 Sep 16	Week 5 Sep 23	Week 6 Sep 30	Week 7 Oct 7	Week 8 Oct 14	Week 9 Oct 21	Week 10 Oct 28	Week 11 Nov 4	Week 12 Nov 11	Week 13 Nov 18	Week 14 Nov 25	Week 15 Dec 2	Week 16 Dec 9	Week 17 (Final) Jan 3	
1.	Nebraska (50)	Nebraska (0–0) (50)	Nebraska (0–0)	Nebraska (1–0) (57)	Nebraska (1–0) (58)	Florida (3–0) (52)	Florida (4–0) (57)	Florida (5–0) (38)	Florida (6–0) (54)	Florida (7–0) (57)	Florida (7–0) (59)	Florida (7–0) (59)	Florida (9–0) (46)	Florida (10–0) (54)	Florida (10–0) (59)	Florida State (11–0) (61)	Florida State (11–0) (62)	Florida (12–1) (65½)	1.
2.	Tennessee (7)	Tennessee (0–0) (8)	Tennessee (1–0) (8)	Tennessee (2–0) (4)	Tennessee (2–0) (5)	Florida State (2–0) (13)	Florida State (3–0) (8)	Ohio State (4–0) (24)	Ohio State (5–0) (7)	Ohio State (6–0) (4)	Ohio State (7–0) (4)	Ohio State (8–0) (5)	Ohio State (9–0) (17)	Ohio State (10–0) (7)	Florida State (10–0) (5)	Arizona State (11–0) (5)	Arizona State (11–0) (5)	Ohio State (11–1) (1½)	2.
3.	Florida State (5)	Florida State (0–0) (5)	Florida State (0–0) (5)	Florida State (1–0) (3)	Florida State (1–0) (4)	Penn State (4–0) (1)	Ohio State (3–0) (1)	Florida State (4–0) (4)	Florida State (5–0) (5)	Florida State (5–0) (5)	Florida State (6–0) (3)	Florida State (7–0) (2)	Florida State (8–0) (2)	Florida State (9–0) (4)	Arizona State (11–0) (3)	Nebraska (10–1) (1)	Florida (11–1)	Florida State (11–1)	3.
4.	Florida (1)	Florida (0–0)	Florida (1–0) (1)	Florida (2–0)	Florida (2–0)	Ohio State (2–0)	Penn State (5–0)	Arizona State (5–0) (1)	Arizona State (6–0) (1)	Arizona State (7–0) (1)	Arizona State (8–0) (1)	Arizona State (9–0) (1)	Arizona State (10–0) (2)	Arizona State (10–0) (2)	Nebraska (9–1)	Florida (10–1)	Ohio State (10–1)	Arizona State (11–1)	4.
5.	Colorado (3)	Colorado (0–0) (3)	Colorado (1–0) (3)	Colorado (2–0) (3)	Penn State (3–0)	Notre Dame (3–0)	Arizona State (4–0) (1)	Nebraska (3–1)	Nebraska (4–1)	Nebraska (5–1)	Nebraska (6–1)	Nebraska (7–1)	Nebraska (8–1)	Nebraska (9–1)	Colorado (9–1)	Ohio State (10–1)	BYU (13–1)	BYU (14–1)	5.
6.	Notre Dame (1)	Notre Dame (0–0) (1)	Notre Dame (0–0) (1)	Penn State (2–0)	Texas (2–0)	Arizona State (3–0) (1)	Michigan (4–0)	Miami (FL) (4–0)	Tennessee (4–1)	Tennessee (4–1)	Tennessee (5–1)	Tennessee (6–1)	Colorado (8–1) T	Colorado (9–1)	Ohio State (10–1)	BYU (12–1)	Nebraska (10–2)	Nebraska (11–2)	6.
7.	USC	Penn State (1–0)	Penn State (1–0)	Texas (2–0)	Ohio State (1–0)	Michigan (3–0)	Nebraska (2–1)	Tennessee (3–1)	Alabama (6–0)	Alabama (7–0)	Colorado (6–1)	Colorado (7–1)	North Carolina (8–1) T	Penn State (9–2)	BYU (12–1)	Colorado (9–2)	Penn State (10–2)	Penn State (11–2)	7.
8.	Texas	Texas (0–0)	Texas (1–0)	Ohio State (1–0)	Michigan (2–0)	Nebraska (1–1)	Miami (FL) (4–0)	Alabama (5–0)	Notre Dame (4–1)	Colorado (5–1)	North Carolina (6–1)	North Carolina (7–1)	Alabama (8–1)	BYU (11–1)	Penn State (10–2)	Penn State (10–2)	Colorado (9–2)	Colorado (10–2)	8.
9.	Ohio State	Ohio State (0–0)	Syracuse (0–0)	Notre Dame (1–0) (1)	Notre Dame (2–0)	Tennessee (2–1)	Tennessee (2–1)	Colorado (3–1)	Colorado (4–1)	North Carolina (5–1)	Michigan (6–1)	Michigan (7–1)	Kansas State (8–1)	Tennessee (7–2)	Tennessee (8–2)	Tennessee (9–2)	Tennessee (9–2)	Tennessee (10–2)	9.
10.	Syracuse	Syracuse (0–0)	Ohio State (0–0)	Miami (FL) (2–0)	Miami (FL) (3–0)	Miami (FL) (3–0)	Colorado (3–1)	Penn State (5–1)	Penn State (6–1)	Michigan (5–1)	Alabama (7–1)	Alabama (7–1)	BYU (10–1)	Notre Dame (7–2)	Notre Dame (8–2)	Northwestern (9–2)	Virginia Tech (10–1)	North Carolina (10–2)	10.
11.	Penn State	Miami (FL) (0–0)	Miami (FL) (1–0)	Michigan (1–0)	North Carolina (2–0)	North Carolina (3–0)	Notre Dame (3–1)	Notre Dame (3–1)	North Carolina (5–1)	Northwestern (6–1)	Northwestern (7–1)	LSU (7–1)	Penn State (8–2)	Northwestern (9–2)	Northwestern (9–2)	Alabama (9–2)	Northwestern (9–2)	Alabama (10–3)	11.
12.	Miami (FL)	Michigan (0–0)	Michigan (1–0)	North Carolina (2–0)	Colorado (2–1)	Colorado (2–1)	Virginia (4–0)	LSU (4–0)	Miami (FL) (4–1)	West Virginia (7–0)	LSU (6–1)	BYU (9–1)	Tennessee (6–2)	Washington (8–2)	Washington (9–2)	Washington (9–2)	North Carolina (9–2)	LSU (10–2)	12.
13.	Texas A&M	Alabama (0–0)	Northwestern (0–0)	Alabama (2–0)	Alabama (3–0) T	Texas (2–1)	Alabama (4–0)	North Carolina (4–1)	Michigan (4–1)	LSU (5–1)	BYU (8–1)	Kansas State (8–1)	Northwestern (8–2)	North Carolina (8–2)	North Carolina (9–2)	North Carolina (9–2)	Washington (9–2)	Virginia Tech (10–2)	13.
14.	Michigan	Virginia Tech (0–0)	Alabama (1–0)	BYU (2–0)	Auburn (3–0) T	Alabama (4–0)	LSU (3–0)	Michigan (4–1)	Northwestern (5–1)	Virginia (5–1)	Kansas State (7–1)	Penn State (8–2)	Notre Dame (6–2)	Kansas State (8–2)	Kansas State (9–2)	Kansas State (9–2)	Kansas State (9–2)	Miami (FL) (9–3)	14.
15.	Alabama	Northwestern (0–0)	Virginia Tech (0–0)	Auburn (2–0)	USC (2–1)	USC (3–1)	North Carolina (3–1)	Northwestern (4–1)	West Virginia (6–0)	BYU (7–1)	Penn State (7–2)	Virginia (6–2)	Washington (7–2)	Alabama (8–2)	Alabama (9–2)	Virginia Tech (9–2)	Michigan (8–3)	Northwestern (9–3)	15.
16.	Virginia Tech	Auburn (0–0)	BYU (2–0)	USC (1–1)	Kansas State (3–0)	Kansas State (4–0)	Kansas State (4–0)	Washington (3–1)	Auburn (5–1)	Kansas State (6–1)	Virginia (5–2)	Wyoming (9–0)	Michigan (7–2)	Syracuse (7–2)	Syracuse (8–2)	Michigan (8–3)	Alabama (9–3)	Washington (9–3)	16.
17.	Auburn	USC (0–1)	LSU (0–0)	Kansas State (2–0)	Arizona State (2–0)	LSU (2–0)	USC (3–1)	West Virginia (6–0)	LSU (4–1)	Penn State (6–2)	Wyoming (8–0)	Notre Dame (5–2)	LSU (6–2)	Virginia Tech (8–1)	Virginia Tech (9–1)	LSU (9–2)	LSU (9–2)	Kansas State (9–3)	17.
18.	Northwestern	LSU (0–0)	Auburn (1–0)	Arizona State (1–0)	Virginia Tech (2–0)	Virginia Tech (3–0)	Washington (2–1)	Auburn (4–1)	BYU (6–1)	Wyoming (8–0)	West Virginia (7–1)	Northwestern (7–2)	Miami (FL) (6–2)	LSU (7–2)	Michigan (8–3)	Notre Dame (8–3)	Notre Dame (8–3)	Iowa (9–3)	18.
19.	LSU	BYU (1–0)	USC (0–1)	Virginia Tech (1–0)	Iowa (2–0)	Virginia (3–0)	West Virginia (5–0)	BYU (5–1)	California (5–0)	Notre Dame (4–2)	Notre Dame (4–2)	Washington (6–2)	Syracuse (6–2)	Virginia (7–3)	LSU (8–2)	Miami (FL) (8–3)	Miami (FL) (8–3)	Notre Dame (8–3)	19.
20.	Arizona State	Arizona State (0–0)	Arizona State (0–0)	LSU (1–0)	Virginia (2–0)	Kansas (2–0)	Auburn (3–1)	Virginia (4–1)	Virginia (4–1)	Iowa (5–1)	Utah (7–1)	Southern Miss (8–2)	Auburn (7–2)	Wyoming (10–1)	Virginia (7–3)	Wyoming (10–1)	Texas (8–4)	Michigan (8–4)	20.
21.	Kansas State	Kansas State (0–0)	Kansas State (1–0)	Iowa (1–0)	LSU (1–0)	Washington (2–1)	BYU (4–1)	California (5–0)	Kansas State (5–1)	Utah (6–1)	Washington (5–2)	Miami (FL) (6–2)	Virginia Tech (7–1)	Michigan (7–3)	Wyoming (10–1)	Iowa (8–3)	Iowa (8–3)	Syracuse (9–3)	21.
22.	Iowa	Iowa (0–0)	Iowa (0–0)	Virginia (1–0)	Kansas (2–0)	Auburn (3–1)	Northwestern (3–1)	Kansas State (4–1)	Georgia Tech (4–1)	Auburn (5–2)	Miami (FL) (5–2)	Auburn (6–2)	Army (9–0)	Clemson (7–3)	Iowa (8–3)	Syracuse (8–3)	Wyoming (10–2)	Wyoming (10–2)	22.
23.	Virginia	Texas A&M (0–1)	Virginia (0–0)	Syracuse (0–1)	Syracuse (0–1)	West Virginia (4–0)	Texas (2–2)	Georgia Tech (4–1)	Wyoming (7–0)	Washington (4–2)	Southern Miss (7–1)	Iowa (6–2)	Wyoming (9–1)	West Virginia (8–2)	Miami (FL) (7–3)	Army (9–1)	Syracuse (8–3)	Texas (8–5)	23.
24.	Kansas	Virginia (0–0)	North Carolina (1–0)	Kansas (1–0)	Washington (1–1)	BYU (3–1)	Utah (4–1)	Wyoming (6–0)	Utah (5–1)	Southern Miss (6–1)	Auburn (5–2)	Syracuse (5–2)	Virginia (6–3)	Iowa (7–3)	Army (9–1)	West Virginia (8–3)	Army (10–1)	Auburn (8–4)	24.
25.	Clemson	Kansas (0–0)	Texas A&M (0–1)	Texas A&M (0–1)	Oregon (3–0)	Northwestern (2–1)	Wyoming (5–0)	Texas (3–2)	Washington (3–2)	Miami (FL) (4–2)	Iowa (5–2)	Virginia Tech (6–1)	Southern Miss (8–2)	Miami (FL) (6–3)	West Virginia (8–3)	Virginia (7–4)	West Virginia (8–3)	Army (10–2)	25.
	Preseason Aug 12	Week 1 Aug 26	Week 2 Sep 2	Week 3 Sep 9	Week 4 Sep 16	Week 5 Sep 23	Week 6 Sep 30	Week 7 Oct 7	Week 8 Oct 14	Week 9 Oct 21	Week 10 Oct 28	Week 11 Nov 4	Week 12 Nov 11	Week 13 Nov 18	Week 14 Nov 25	Week 15 Dec 2	Week 16 Dec 9	Week 17 (Final) Jan 3	
		Dropped: Clemson	Dropped: Kansas	Dropped: Northwestern	Dropped: BYU; Texas A&M	Dropped: Iowa; Syracuse; Oregon	Dropped: Virginia Tech; Kansas	Dropped: USC; Utah	Dropped: Texas	Dropped: California; Georgia Tech	None	Dropped: West Virginia; Utah	Dropped: Iowa	Dropped: Auburn; Army; Southern Miss	Dropped: Clemson	None	Dropped: Virginia	Dropped: West Virginia	

== Coaches Poll ==
	Preseason Aug 12	Week 2 Sep 3	Week 3 Sep 9	Week 4 Sep 16	Week 5 Sep 23	Week 6 Sep 30	Week 7 Oct 7	Week 8 Oct 14	Week 9 Oct 21	Week 10 Oct 28	Week 11 Nov 4	Week 12 Nov 11	Week 13 Nov 18	Week 14 Nov 25	Week 15 Dec 2	Week 16 Dec 9	Week 17 (Final) Jan 3	
1.	Nebraska (47)	Nebraska (0–0) (51)	Nebraska (1–0) (57)	Nebraska (1–0) (58)	Florida (3–0) (38)	Florida (4–0) (48)	Florida (5–0) (36)	Florida (6–0) (53)	Florida (7–0) (56)	Florida (7–0) (53)	Florida (8–0) (53)	Florida (9–0) (37)	Florida (10–0) (46)	Florida (10–0) (52)	Florida State (11–0) (56)	Florida State (11–0) (57)	Florida (12–1) (58)	1.
2.	Tennessee (6)	Tennessee (1–0) (4)	Tennessee (2–0) (1)	Tennessee (2–0) (2)	Florida State (2–0) (22)	Florida State (3–0) (9)	Ohio State (4–0) (20)	Florida State (5–0) (7)	Florida State (5–0) (5)	Florida State (6–0) (5)	Florida State (7–0) (5)	Ohio State (9–0) (16)	Ohio State (10–0) (9)	Florida State (10–0) (7)	Arizona State (11–0) (6)	Arizona State (11–0) (5)	Ohio State (11–1) (4)	2.
3.	Florida State (6)	Florida State (0–0) (3)	Florida State (1–0) (1)	Florida State (1–0) (1)	Penn State (4–0)	Ohio State (3–0) (5)	Florida State (4–0) (6)	Ohio State (5–0) (2)	Ohio State (6–0) (1)	Ohio State (7–0) (4)	Ohio State (8–0) (4)	Florida State (8–0) (8)	Florida State (9–0) (7)	Arizona State (11–0) (3)	Nebraska (10–1)	Florida (11–1)	Florida State (11–1)	3.
4.	Florida (3)	Florida (1–0) (3)	Florida (2–0) (3)	Florida (2–0) (1)	Ohio State (2–0) (2)	Penn State (5–0)	Nebraska (3–1)	Nebraska (4–1)	Arizona State (7–0)	Arizona State (8–0)	Arizona State (9–0)	Arizona State (10–0) (1)	Arizona State (10–0)	Nebraska (9–1)	Florida (10–1)	Ohio State (10–1)	Arizona State (11–1)	4.
5.	Colorado	Colorado (1–0)	Colorado (2–0)	Penn State (3–0)	Notre Dame (3–0)	Michigan (4–0)	Arizona State (5–0)	Arizona State (6–0)	Nebraska (5–1)	Nebraska (6–1)	Nebraska (7–1)	Nebraska (8–1)	Nebraska (9–1)	Colorado (9–1)	Ohio State (10–1)	BYU (13–1)	BYU (14–1)	5.
6.	USC	Penn State (1–0) (1)	Penn State (2–0)	Ohio State (1–0)	Michigan (3–0)	Nebraska (2–1)	Miami (FL) (4–0)	Tennessee (4–1)	Alabama (7–0)	Tennessee (5–1)	Tennessee (6–1)	Colorado (8–1)	Colorado (9–1)	Ohio State (10–1)	BYU (12–1)	Nebraska (10–2)	Nebraska (11–2)	6.
7.	Notre Dame	Notre Dame (0–0)	Ohio State (1–0)	Michigan (2–0)	Nebraska (1–1)	Arizona State (4–0)	Tennessee (3–1)	Alabama (6–0)	Tennessee (4–1)	Colorado (6–1)	Colorado (7–1)	North Carolina (8–1)	BYU (11–1)	BYU (12–1)	Penn State (10–2)	Penn State (10–2)	Penn State (11–2)	7.
8.	Penn State	Texas (1–0)	Texas (2–0)	Texas (2–0)	Tennessee (2–1)	Miami (FL) (4–0)	Alabama (5–0)	Penn State (6–1)	Colorado (5–1)	North Carolina (6–1)	North Carolina (7–1)	Alabama (8–1)	Penn State (9–2)	Penn State (10–2)	Colorado (9–2)	Colorado (9–2)	Colorado (10–2)	8.
9.	Texas	Ohio State (0–0)	Michigan (1–0)	Notre Dame (2–0)	Miami (FL) (3–0)	Tennessee (2–1)	Penn State (5–1)	Notre Dame (4–1)	North Carolina (5–1)	Michigan (6–1)	Michigan (7–1)	Kansas State (8–1)	Virginia Tech (8–1)	Virginia Tech (9–1)	Virginia Tech (10–1)	Virginia Tech (10–1)	Tennessee (10–2)	9.
10.	Ohio State	Michigan (1–0)	Notre Dame (1–0)	Miami (FL) (3–0)	Alabama (4–0)	Alabama (4–0)	Colorado (3–1)	Colorado (4–1)	Michigan (5–1)	Northwestern (7–1)	Alabama (7–1)	BYU (10–1)	Tennessee (7–2)	Tennessee (8–2)	Tennessee (10–2)	Tennessee (9–2)	North Carolina (10–2)	10.
11.	Michigan	Syracuse (0–0)	Miami (FL) (2–0)	Alabama (3–0)	North Carolina (3–0)	Virginia (4–0)	LSU (4–0)	North Carolina (5–1)	West Virginia (7–0)	Alabama (7–1)	Kansas State (7–1)	Penn State (8–2)	Northwestern (9–2)	Northwestern (9–2)	Alabama (9–2)	Northwestern (9–2)	Alabama (10–3)	11.
12.	Texas A&M	Miami (FL) (1–0)	Alabama (2–0)	Colorado (2–1)	Arizona State (3–0)	Kansas State (4–0)	Notre Dame (3–1)	Michigan (4–1)	Northwestern (6–1)	Kansas State (7–1)	BYU (9–1)	Tennessee (6–2)	Alabama (8–2)	Alabama (9–2)	Northwestern (9–2)	Washington (9–2)	Virginia Tech (10–2)	12.
13.	Syracuse	Alabama (1–0)	North Carolina (2–0)	North Carolina (2–0)	Kansas State (4–0)	Colorado (3–1)	Michigan (4–1)	Miami (FL) (4–1)	Virginia (5–1)	LSU (6–1)	LSU (6–1)	Virginia Tech (7–1)	Notre Dame (7–2)	Notre Dame (8–2)	Washington (9–2)	North Carolina (9–2)	LSU (10–2)	13.
14.	Alabama	Virginia Tech (0–0)	Kansas State (2–0)	Kansas State (3–0)	Texas (2–1)	Notre Dame (3–1)	North Carolina (4–1)	West Virginia (6–0)	Kansas State (6–1)	BYU (8–1)	Penn State (8–2)	Northwestern (8–2)	North Carolina (8–2)	North Carolina (9–2)	North Carolina (9–2)	Kansas State (9–2)	Miami (FL) (9–3)	14.
15.	Virginia Tech	Kansas State (1–0)	BYU (2–0)	Auburn (3–0)	Colorado (2–1)	LSU (3–0)	West Virginia (6–0)	Northwestern (5–1)	LSU (5–1)	Penn State (7–2)	Wyoming (9–0)	Notre Dame (6–2)	Washington (8–2)	Washington (9–2)	Kansas State (9–2)	Alabama (9–3)	Washington (9–3)	15.
16.	Miami (FL)	BYU (2–0)	Auburn (2–0)	Virginia Tech (2–0)	Virginia Tech (3–0)	USC (3–1)	Washington (3–1)	Auburn (5–1)	BYU (7–1)	Wyoming (8–0)	Virginia (6–2)	Michigan (7–2)	Kansas State (8–2)	Kansas State (9–2)	LSU (9–2)	LSU (9–2)	Northwestern (9–3)	16.
17.	Auburn	Auburn (1–0)	Virginia (1–0)	Virginia (2–0)	Virginia (3–0)	North Carolina (3–1)	Virginia (4–1)	Virginia (4–1)	Penn State (6–2)	West Virginia (7–1)	Virginia Tech (6–1)	Washington (7–2)	Syracuse (7–2)	Syracuse (8–2)	Michigan (8–3)	Michigan (8–3)	Kansas State (9–3)	17.
18.	Kansas State	Northwestern (0–0)	USC (1–1)	USC (2–1)	USC (3–1)	Washington (2–1)	Northwestern (4–1)	LSU (4–1)	Wyoming (8–0)	Virginia (5–2)	Northwestern (7–2)	Miami (FL) (6–2)	LSU (7–2)	LSU (8–2)	Notre Dame (8–3)	Notre Dame (8–3)	Iowa (9–3)	18.
19.	Northwestern	LSU (0–0)	Virginia Tech (1–0)	Iowa (2–0)	LSU (2–0)	West Virginia (5–0)	Auburn (4–1)	Kansas State (5–1)	Iowa (5–1)	Utah (7–1)	Notre Dame (5–2)	Syracuse (6–2)	Virginia (7–3) т	Michigan (8–3)	Wyoming (10–1)	Miami (FL) (8–3)	Syracuse (9–3)	19.
20.	LSU	Virginia (0–0)	LSU (1–0)	Kansas (2–0)	Kansas (2–0)	Auburn (3–1)	BYU (5–1)	BYU (6–1)	Notre Dame (4–2)	Virginia Tech (5–1)	Washington (6–2)	LSU (6–2)	Wyoming (10–1) т	Wyoming (10–1)	Miami (FL) (8–3)	Texas (8–4)	Michigan (8–4)	20.
21.	Virginia	USC (0–1)	Iowa (1–0)	LSU (1–0)	Washington (2–1)	BYU (4–1)	Kansas State (4–1)	California (5–0)	Virginia Tech (4–1)	Notre Dame (4–2)	Miami (FL) (6–2)	Auburn (7–2)	West Virginia (8–2)	Virginia (7–3)	Iowa (8–3)	Iowa (8–3)	Notre Dame (8–3)	21.
22.	Washington	North Carolina (1–0)	Kansas (1–0)	Arizona State (2–0)	Auburn (3–1)	Virginia Tech (3–1)	California (5–0)	Wyoming (7–0)	Utah (6–1)	Miami (FL) (5–2)	Southern Miss (8–1)	Wyoming (9–1)	Michigan (7–3)	Iowa (8–3)	Syracuse (8–3)	Syracuse (8–3)	Wyoming (10–2)	22.
23.	Clemson	Washington (0–0)	Arizona State (1–0)	Washington (1–1)	West Virginia (4–0)	Texas (2–2)	Virginia Tech (3–1)	Virginia Tech (4–1)	Miami (FL) (4–2)	Washington (5–2)	Syracuse (5–2)	Army (9–0)	Iowa (7–3)	Miami (FL) (7–3)	Army (9–1)	Wyoming (10–2)	Texas (8–5)	23.
24.	Kansas	Kansas (1–0)	Syracuse (0–1)	Syracuse (0–1)	BYU (3–1)	Utah (4–1)	Wyoming (6–0)	Georgia Tech (4–1)	Washington (4–2)	Southern Miss (7–1)	Auburn (6–2)	West Virginia (8–2)	Clemson (7–3)	Army (9–1)	West Virginia (8–3)	Army (10–1)	Army (10–2)	24.
25.	Iowa	Texas A&M (0–1)	Texas A&M (0–1)	BYU (2–1)	Iowa (2–1)	Wyoming (5–0)	Texas (3–2)	Utah (5–1)	California (5–1)	Auburn (5–2)	Iowa (6–2)	Virginia (6–3)	Miami (FL) (6–3)	West Virginia (8–3)	Virginia (7–4)	West Virginia (8–3)	Auburn (8–4)	25.
	Preseason Aug 12	Week 2 Sep 3	Week 3 Sep 9	Week 4 Sep 16	Week 5 Sep 23	Week 6 Sep 30	Week 7 Oct 7	Week 8 Oct 14	Week 9 Oct 21	Week 10 Oct 28	Week 11 Nov 4	Week 12 Nov 11	Week 13 Nov 18	Week 14 Nov 25	Week 15 Dec 2	Week 16 Dec 9	Week 17 (Final) Jan 3	
		Dropped: Clemson; Iowa	Dropped: Northwestern; Washington	Dropped: Texas A&M	Dropped: Syracuse	Dropped: Kansas; Iowa	Dropped: USC; Utah	Dropped: Washington; Texas	Dropped: Auburn; Georgia Tech	Dropped: Iowa; California	Dropped: West Virginia; Utah	Dropped: Southern Miss; Iowa	Dropped: Auburn; Army	Dropped: Clemson	None	Dropped: Virginia	Dropped: West Virginia	
