= 1996 Air Force Falcons football team =

American college football season

1996 Air Force Falcons football
- Conference: Western Athletic Conference
- Pacific Division
- Record: 6–5 (5–3 WAC)
- Head coach: Fisher DeBerry (13th season)
- Offensive coordinator: Paul Hamilton (7th season)
- Offensive scheme: Wishbone triple option
- Co-defensive coordinators: Richard Bell (2nd season); Cal McCombs (7th season)
- Base defense: 3–4
- Captains: Chris Gizzi; Lee Guthrie; Beau Morgan
- Home stadium: Falcon Stadium

1996 Western Athletic Conference football standings
	Conf.			Overall
Team	W		L	W		L
Mountain Division
No. 5 BYU x$	8	–	0	14	–	1
Utah	6	–	2	8	–	4
Rice	6	–	2	7	–	4
SMU	4	–	4	5	–	6
New Mexico	3	–	5	6	–	5
TCU	3	–	5	4	–	7
Tulsa	2	–	6	4	–	7
UTEP	0	–	8	2	–	9
Pacific Division
No. 22 Wyoming x	7	–	1	10	–	2
San Diego State	6	–	2	8	–	3
Colorado State	6	–	2	7	–	5
Air Force	5	–	3	6	–	5
Fresno State	3	–	5	4	–	7
San Jose State	3	–	5	3	–	9
Hawaii	1	–	7	2	–	10
UNLV	1	–	7	1	–	11
Championship: BYU 28, Wyoming 25 ^{OT}
$ – Conference champion; x – Division champion/co-champions; Rankings from AP Poll

The 1996 Air Force Falcons football team represented the United States Air Force Academy as a member of the Pacific Division of the Western Athletic Conference (WAC) during the 1996 NCAA Division I-A football season. Led by 13th-year head coach Fisher DeBerry, the Falcons compiled an overall record of 6–5 with a mark of 5–3 in conference play, placing fourth the WAC's Pacific Division. The team played home games at Falcon Stadium in Colorado Springs, Colorado

== Schedule ==
Date	Time	Opponent	Site	TV	Result	Attendance
August 31		San Jose State	Falcon Stadium; Colorado Springs, CO		W 45–0	
September 7		at UNLV	Sam Boyd Stadium; Whitney, NV		W 65–17	22,945
September 21	1:00 p.m.	at Wyoming	War Memorial Stadium; Laramie, WY		L 19–22	31,009
September 28		Rice	Falcon Stadium; Colorado Springs, CO		W 45–17	
October 12		Navy*	Falcon Stadium; Colorado Springs, CO (Commander-in-Chief's Trophy)		L 17–20	
October 19	12:30 p.m.	at No. 8 Notre Dame*	Notre Dame Stadium; Notre Dame, IN (rivalry)		W 20–17 ^{OT}	59,075
October 26		Hawaii	Falcon Stadium; Colorado Springs, CO (rivalry)		W 34–7	36,454
November 2		Colorado State	Falcon Stadium; Colorado Springs, CO (rivalry)		L 41–42	51,116
November 9	1:30 p.m.	at Army*	Michie Stadium; West Point, NY (Commander-in-Chief's Trophy)	ABC	L 7–23	41,251
November 16		at Fresno State	Bulldog Stadium; Fresno, CA		W 44–38 ^{OT}	39,112
November 28		at San Diego State	Jack Murphy Stadium; San Diego, CA	ESPN2	L 23–28	18,353
*Non-conference game; Rankings from AP Poll released prior to the game; All times are in Mountain time

== Roster ==
1996 Air Force Falcons football team roster
Players
Coaches
Offense

Pos.	#	Name	Class
TE	87	Matt Brancato	So
RB	15	Floyd Brazier	Jr
OT	60	Scott Breece	Jr
QB	2	Tom Brown	Sr
OT	64	Jason Campbell	Sr
OT	73	Joe Cashman	So
OL	74	Frank Mindrup	So
QB	12	Beau Morgan	Sr
QB	11	Blane Morgan	So

Defense

Pos.	#	Name	Class
LB	56	Steve Fernandez	Jr
LB	91	Sean Finnan	Jr
DT	70	Craig Fisher	So
LB	51	Chris Gizzi	Jr

Special teams

Pos.	#	Name	Class
K		Dallas Thompson

Head coach

- Fisher DeBerry

Coordinators/assistant coaches

Legend

- (C) Team captain
- (S) Suspended
- (I) Ineligible
- Injured
- Redshirt

Roster

== NFL draft ==
The following Falcon was selected in the 1997 NFL draft following the season.

Round	Pick	Player	Position	NFL team
6	178	Daniel Palmer	Center	San Diego Chargers
