= 1996 WAC Championship Game =

- Inaugural WAC Championship Game
| BYU Cougars | Wyoming Cowboys |
| (12–1) | (10–1) |
| 28 | 25 |
| Head coach: LaVell Edwards | Head coach: Joe Tiller |
| AP / Coaches; 6 / 6 | AP / Coaches; 20 / 19 |
| | 1 | 2 | 3 | 4 | OT | Total |
|---|---|---|---|---|---|---|
| BYU | 3 | 10 | 0 | 12 | 3 | 28 |
| Wyoming | 0 | 0 | 10 | 15 | 0 | 25 |
- Date: December 7, 1996
- Season: 1996
- Stadium: Sam Boyd Stadium
- Location: Whitney, Nevada
- Attendance: 41,238

United States TV coverage
- Network: ABC

1996 Western Athletic Conference football standings
| | Conf. | | | Overall |
| Team | W | | L | W | | L |
|---|---|---|---|---|---|---|
Mountain Division
| No. 5 BYU x$ | 8 | – | 0 | 14 | – | 1 |
| Utah | 6 | – | 2 | 8 | – | 4 |
| Rice | 6 | – | 2 | 7 | – | 4 |
| SMU | 4 | – | 4 | 5 | – | 6 |
| New Mexico | 3 | – | 5 | 6 | – | 5 |
| TCU | 3 | – | 5 | 4 | – | 7 |
| Tulsa | 2 | – | 6 | 4 | – | 7 |
| UTEP | 0 | – | 8 | 2 | – | 9 |
Pacific Division
| No. 22 Wyoming x | 7 | – | 1 | 10 | – | 2 |
| San Diego State | 6 | – | 2 | 8 | – | 3 |
| Colorado State | 6 | – | 2 | 7 | – | 5 |
| Air Force | 5 | – | 3 | 6 | – | 5 |
| Fresno State | 3 | – | 5 | 4 | – | 7 |
| San Jose State | 3 | – | 5 | 3 | – | 9 |
| Hawaii | 1 | – | 7 | 2 | – | 10 |
| UNLV | 1 | – | 8 | 1 | – | 11 |
Championship: BYU 28, Wyoming 25 ^{OT}
$ – Conference champion; x – Division champion/co-champions; Rankings from AP Poll

The 1996 WAC Championship Game was a college football game played on Saturday, December 7, 1996, at Sam Boyd Stadium in Whitney, Nevada. This was the 1st WAC Championship Game and determined the 1996 champion of the Western Athletic Conference. The game featured the BYU Cougars, champions of the Mountain division, and the Wyoming Cowboys, champions of the Pacific division. BYU would win the game 28–25 in overtime and secure the program's 19th and last-ever WAC championship.

== Game summary ==
1996 WAC Championship Game

| Quarter | 1 | 2 | 3 | 4 | OT | Total |
|---|---|---|---|---|---|---|
| No. 6 BYU | 3 | 10 | 0 | 12 | 3 | 28 |
| No. 20 Wyoming | 0 | 0 | 10 | 15 | 0 | 25 |

at Sam Boyd Stadium • Whitney, Nevada

- Date: December 7, 1996
- Game time: 2:30 p.m. CST
- TV: ABC
- WAC game summary

Game information

First quarter

- (9:04) BYU – Ethan Pochman 30 yard field goal (Drive: 3 plays, 9 yards, 2:19; BYU 3–0)

Second quarter

- (11:53) BYU – Brian McKenzie 11 yard run, Ethan Pochman kick (Drive: 8 plays, 72 yards, 3:56; BYU 10–0)
- (0:55) BYU – Ethan Pochman 47 yard field goal (Drive: 9 plays, 45 yards, 5:21; BYU 13–0)

Third quarter

- (12:53) WYO – Jay Jenkins 25 fumble return, Cory Wedel kick (Drive: 1 plays, 25 yards, 0:00; BYU 13–7)
- (6:27) WYO – Cory Wedel 20 yard field goal (Drive: 9 plays, 77 yards, 4:34; BYU 13–10)

Fourth quarter

- (13:28) WYO – David Saraf 7 yard pass from Josh Wallwork, Cory Wedel kick (Drive: 10 plays, 92 yards, 2:03; WYO 17–13)
- (11:28) BYU – Chad Lewis 13 yard pass from Steve Sarkisian, Ethan Pochman kick (Drive: 3 plays, 44 yards, 1:18; BYU 20–17)
- (9:24) WYO – David Saraf 14 yard pass from Josh Wallwork, Josh Wallwork–Todd Grosskopf pass (Drive: 6 plays, 80 yards, 2:04; WYO 25–20)
- (1:56) BYU – Team Safety (Drive: 4 plays, -2 yards, 1:01; WYO 25–22)
- (0:00) BYU – Ethan Pochman 20 yard field goal (Drive: 7 plays, 57 yards, 1:56; Tied 25–25)

Overtime

- (0:00) BYU – Ethan Pochman 32 yard field goal (Drive: 3 plays, 9 yards, 0:00; BYU 28–25)

=== Statistics ===
| Statistics | BYU | WYO |
|---|---|---|
| First downs | 19 | 17 |
| Plays–yards | 73–354 | 63–367 |
| Rushes–yards | 36–104 | 29–85 |
| Passing yards | 250 | 282 |
| Passing: comp–att–int | 26–37–0 | 16–34–3 |
| Time of possession | 36:58 | 23:02 |

| Team | Category | Player | Statistics |
|---|---|---|---|
| BYU | Passing | Steve Sarkisian | 26–37, 250 yds, 1 TD |
| BYU | Rushing | Brian McKenzie | 17 car, 64 yds, 1 TD |
| BYU | Receiving | Dustin Johnson | 7 rec, 69 yds |
| Wyoming | Passing | Josh Wallwork | 16–34, 282 yds, 2 TD, 3 INT |
| Wyoming | Rushing | Len Sexton | 10 car, 38 yds |
| Wyoming | Receiving | Marcus Harris | 6 rec, 118 yds |
