= Fred von Appen =

American football player and coach (born 1942)

Biographical details
- Born: March 22, 1942 (age 84); Eugene, Oregon, U.S.

Playing career
- 1960–1963: Linfield
- Positions: Linebacker, guard

Coaching career (HC unless noted)
- 1964: Linfield (assistant)
- 1969: Arkansas (assistant)
- 1970: UCLA (assistant)
- 1971: Virginia Tech (assistant)
- 1972–1976: Oregon (DC/DL)
- 1977–1978: Stanford (DL)
- 1979: Green Bay Packers (DL)
- 1981: Arkansas (DL)
- 1982: Stanford (DC)
- 1983–1988: San Francisco 49ers (ST)
- 1989: Stanford (DC)
- 1990–1991: Pittsburgh (AHC/DC)
- 1992–1994: Stanford (DC)
- 1995: Colorado (DL)
- 1996–1998: Hawaii
- 2000: Minnesota Vikings (DL)
- 2001: New York Giants (ST)
- 2003: Montana (AHC/DE)

Head coaching record
- Overall: 5–31

Frederick Martin von Appen (born March 22, 1942) is an American former football player and coach. He served as the head coach at the University of Hawaiʻi at Mānoa from 1996 to 1998, compiling a record of 5–31. He also served as an assistant on a number of college football and National Football League (NFL) coaching staffs over a 40-year period.

== Playing career ==
Von Appen was a linebacker and guard at Linfield College in McMinnville, Oregon, where he was a three-time all-conference selection. He was briefly in the San Diego Chargers camp in 1964.

== Coaching career ==
Von Appen began his coaching career in 1964 at his alma mater, Linfield. He earned a master's degree in secondary education at Linfield in 1965. After leaving Linfield, von Appen served in the United States Army before resuming his coaching career at the University of Arkansas in 1969. He moved on to UCLA in 1970, Virginia Tech in 1971, and then the University of Oregon from 1972 to 1976. Von Appen made the first of four stints at Stanford University from 1977 to 1978.

von Appen spent the 1979 season as the Green Bay Packers' defensive line coach. He resigned during the 1980 preseason in protest of head coach Bart Starr's lenient punishment of defensive end Ezra Johnson, who was caught eating a hot dog on the sidelines during an exhibition game. von Appen returned to Arkansas in 1981, where he was the defensive line coach under Lou Holtz. He returned to Stanford in 1982 for a season. Former Stanford head coach Bill Walsh brought Von Appen to the San Francisco 49ers from 1983 to 1988, where his duties included special teams.

In 1989, von Appen returned again to Stanford as the defensive coordinator under head coach Dennis Green. From 1990 to 1991, von Appen was the defensive coordinator and assistant head coach at the University of Pittsburgh. When Walsh became Stanford's head coach for the second time in 1992, he brought von Appen back as defensive coordinator. Von Appen was the defensive line coach at the University of Colorado at Boulder before becoming the head coach at the University of Hawaii. He was fired from his post at Hawaii after his third season in 1998, a winless campaign.

Von Appen spent the 2000 season as the defensive line coach for the Minnesota Vikings and the 2001 season as the special teams coach for the New York Giants. He retired briefly after the 2001 season, but returned to coaching to serve as the defensive ends coach and assistant head coach at the University of Montana. He retired for good after the 2003 season.

== Head coaching record ==
Year	Team	Overall	Conference	Standing	Bowl/playoffs
Hawaii Rainbow Warriors (Western Athletic Conference) (1996–1998)
1996	Hawaii	2–10	1–7	T–7th (Pacific)	
1997	Hawaii	3–9	1–7	8th (Pacific)	
1998	Hawaii	0–12	0–8	8th (Pacific)	
Hawaii:		5–31	2–22		
Total:		5–31			
