= 1996 Wyoming Cowboys football team =

American college football season

1996 Wyoming Cowboys football

WAC Pacific Division champion

WAC Championship Game, L 25–28 ^{OT} vs. BYU
- Conference: Western Athletic Conference
- Pacific Division

Ranking
- Coaches: No. 22
- AP: No. 22
- Record: 10–2 (7–1 WAC)
- Head coach: Joe Tiller (6th season)
- Offensive coordinator: Larry Korpitz (6th season)
- Defensive coordinator: Brock Spack (2nd season)
- Home stadium: War Memorial Stadium

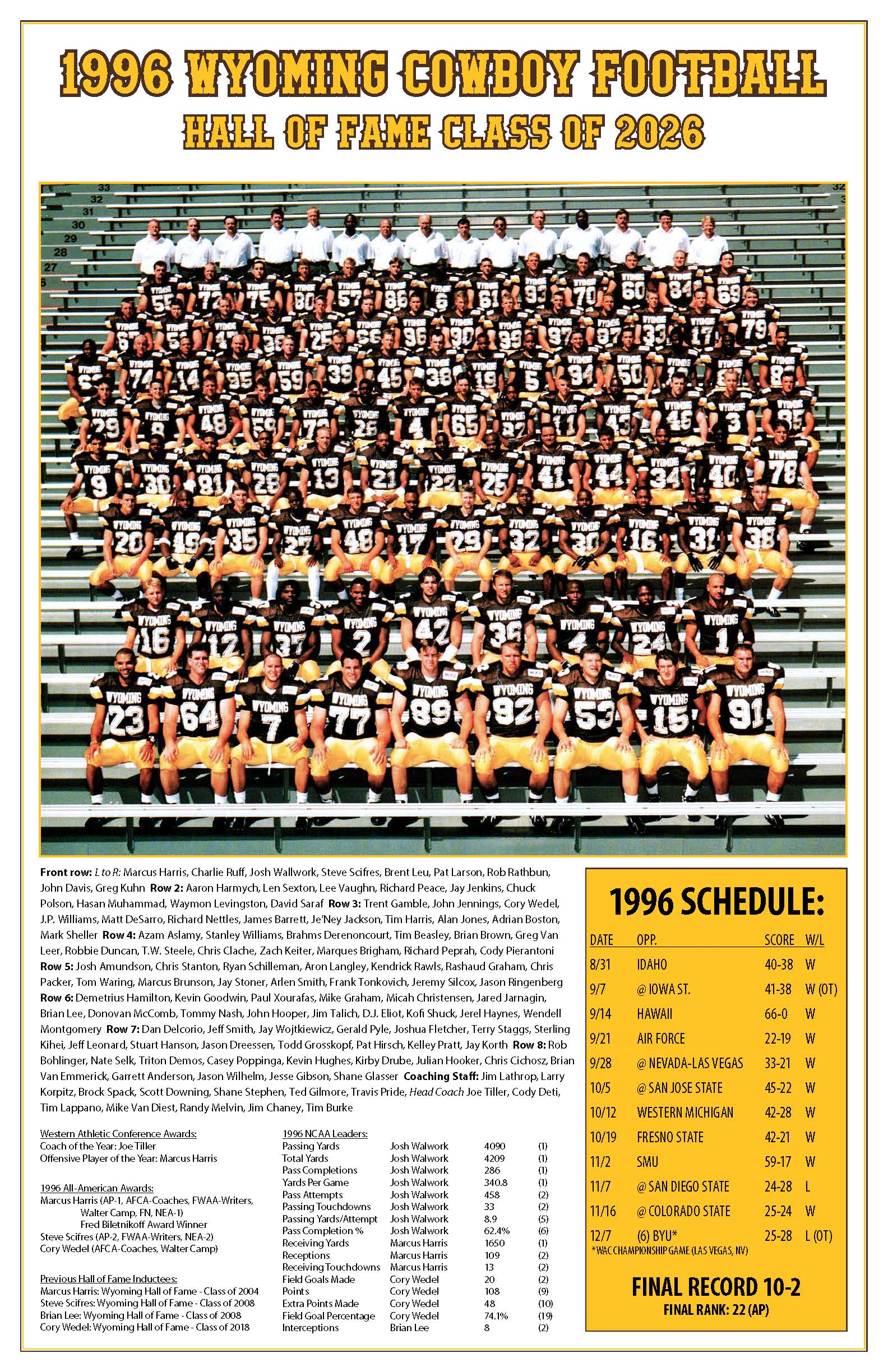

1996 Western Athletic Conference football standings
	Conf.			Overall
Team	W		L	W		L
Mountain Division
No. 5 BYU x$	8	–	0	14	–	1
Utah	6	–	2	8	–	4
Rice	6	–	2	7	–	4
SMU	4	–	4	5	–	6
New Mexico	3	–	5	6	–	5
TCU	3	–	5	4	–	7
Tulsa	2	–	6	4	–	7
UTEP	0	–	8	2	–	9
Pacific Division
No. 22 Wyoming x	7	–	1	10	–	2
San Diego State	6	–	2	8	–	3
Colorado State	6	–	2	7	–	5
Air Force	5	–	3	6	–	5
Fresno State	3	–	5	4	–	7
San Jose State	3	–	5	3	–	9
Hawaii	1	–	7	2	–	10
UNLV	1	–	7	1	–	11
Championship: BYU 28, Wyoming 25 ^{OT}
$ – Conference champion; x – Division champion/co-champions; Rankings from AP Poll

The 1996 Wyoming Cowboys football team represented the University of Wyoming in the 1996 NCAA Division I-A football season. It was the Cowboys' 100th season and they competed as a member of the Pacific Division in the Western Athletic Conference (WAC). The team was led by head coach Joe Tiller, in his sixth year, and played their home games at War Memorial Stadium in Laramie, Wyoming. They finished with a record of ten wins and two losses (10–2, 7–1 WAC). Despite winning the Pacific Division and their double-digit victory total, the Cowboys were not invited to a postseason bowl game. Their season ended with a loss against BYU in the inaugural WAC Championship Game. The Cowboys offense scored 464 points while the defense allowed 284 points.

In 2026 the entire team was inducted into the University of Wyoming athletics hall of fame.

== Schedule ==
Date	Time	Opponent	Rank	Site	TV	Result	Attendance
August 31	1:00 pm	Idaho*		War Memorial Stadium; Laramie, WY		W 40–38	17,279
September 7	5:00 pm	at Iowa State*		Cyclone Stadium; Ames, IA	FSN	W 41–38 ^{OT}	44,511
September 14	1:00 pm	Hawaii		War Memorial Stadium; Laramie, WY		W 66–0	15,182
September 21	1:00 pm	Air Force		War Memorial Stadium; Laramie, WY		W 22–19	31,009
September 28	2:00 pm	at UNLV		Sam Boyd Stadium; Whitney, NV		W 33–21	12,564
October 5	2:30 pm	at San Jose State	No. 25	Spartan Stadium; San Jose, CA		W 45–22	8,756
October 12	1:00 pm	Western Michigan*	No. 24	War Memorial Stadium; Laramie, WY		W 42–28	22,813
October 19	12:00 pm	Fresno State	No. 23	War Memorial Stadium; Laramie, WY		W 42–21	14,446
November 2	1:00 pm	SMU	No. 17	War Memorial Stadium; Laramie, WY		W 59–17	17,268
November 7	6:00 pm	at San Diego State	No. 16	Jack Murphy Stadium; San Diego, CA	ESPN	L 24–28	38,679
November 16	8:00 pm	at Colorado State	No. 23	Hughes Stadium; Fort Collins, CO (Border War)	ESPN2	W 25–24	33,701
December 7	2:30 pm	vs. No. 6 BYU	No. 20	Sam Boyd Stadium; Whitney, NV (WAC Championship Game)	ABC	L 25–28 ^{OT}	41,238
*Non-conference game; Rankings from AP Poll released prior to the game; All times are in Mountain time

== Roster ==
1996 Wyoming Cowboys football team roster
Players
Coaches
Offense

Pos.	#	Name	Class
RB	29	Josh Amundson	So
OT	70	Garrett Anderson	Fr
RB	28	Tim Beasley	Fr
OT	55	Rob Bohlinger	Jr
WR	23	Marcus Harris	Sr
C	53	Rob Rathbun	Sr
WR	85	Jason Ringenberg	Fr
C	64	Charlie Ruff	Sr
C	57	Kevin Hughes	Fr
FB	41	Chris Clache	Fr
WR	1	David Saraf	Sr
OT	77	Steve Scifres	Sr
G	72	Nate Selk	Fr
RB	12	Len Sexton	Sr
WR	18	Kofi Shuck	Fr
WR	16	Alan Jones	Fr
QB	3	Jeremy Silcox	Jr
TE	91	Greg Kuhn	Sr
RB	43	Arlen Smith	Fr
G	51	Jeff Smith	So
G	66	Terry Staggs	So

Defense

Pos.	#	Name	Class
DT	92	Pat Larson	Sr
DT	95	Michael Graham	Jr
SS	45	Brian Lee	Jr
DE	90	Jeff Leonard	Jr
DT	89	Brent Leu	Sr
CB	24	Waymon Levingston	Sr

Special teams

Pos.	#	Name	Class

Head coach

- Joe Tiller

Coordinators/assistant coaches

- Tim Burke (defensive backs)

Legend

- (C) Team captain
- (S) Suspended
- (I) Ineligible
- Injured
- Redshirt

Roster

== Awards and honors ==
- Marcus Harris: Fred Biletnikoff Award

== Team players in the NFL ==
The following were selected in the 1997 NFL draft.

Player	Position	Round	Overall	NFL team
Steve Scifres	Guard	3	83	Dallas Cowboys
Lee Vaughn	Defensive back	6	187	Dallas Cowboys
Marcus Harris	Wide receiver	7	232	Detroit Lions
