= 1996 San Jose State Spartans football team =

American college football season

1996 San Jose State Spartans football
- Conference: Western Athletic Conference
- Pacific Division
- Record: 3–9 (3–5 WAC)
- Head coach: John Ralston (4th season)
- Offensive coordinator: Roger Theder (4th season)
- Defensive coordinator: Mike Church (2nd season)
- Home stadium: Spartan Stadium

1996 Western Athletic Conference football standings
	Conf.			Overall
Team	W		L	W		L
Mountain Division
No. 5 BYU x$	8	–	0	14	–	1
Utah	6	–	2	8	–	4
Rice	6	–	2	7	–	4
SMU	4	–	4	5	–	6
New Mexico	3	–	5	6	–	5
TCU	3	–	5	4	–	7
Tulsa	2	–	6	4	–	7
UTEP	0	–	8	2	–	9
Pacific Division
No. 22 Wyoming x	7	–	1	10	–	2
San Diego State	6	–	2	8	–	3
Colorado State	6	–	2	7	–	5
Air Force	5	–	3	6	–	5
Fresno State	3	–	5	4	–	7
San Jose State	3	–	5	3	–	9
Hawaii	1	–	7	2	–	10
UNLV	1	–	7	1	–	11
Championship: BYU 28, Wyoming 25 ^{OT}
$ – Conference champion; x – Division champion/co-champions; Rankings from AP Poll

The 1996 San Jose State Spartans football team represented San Jose State University during the 1996 NCAA Division I-A football season as a member of the Western Athletic Conference. 1996 was the first year San Jose State was a member of the Western Athletic Conference. They had previously been a member of the Big West Conference since its formation in 1969 as the Pacific Coast Athletic Association (PCAA).

The team was led by head coach John Ralston, in his fourth year as head coach at San Jose State. They played home games at Spartan Stadium in San Jose, California. The Spartans finished the 1996 season with a record of three wins and nine losses (3–9, 3–5 WAC).

== Schedule ==
Date	Opponent	Site	TV	Result	Attendance	Source
August 31	at Air Force	Falcon Stadium; Colorado Springs, CO		L 0–45		
September 7	California*	Spartan Stadium; San Jose, CA		L 25–45	22,647	
September 14	at Stanford*	Stanford Stadium; Stanford, CA (rivalry)		L 2–25	34,150	
September 21	UTEP	Spartan Stadium; San Jose, CA		W 26–25	10,433	
September 28	at Washington State*	Martin Stadium; Pullman, WA		L 16–52	24,195	
October 5	No. 25 Wyoming	Spartan Stadium; San Jose, CA		L 22–45	8,756	
October 12	at Fresno State	Bulldog Stadium; Fresno, California (rivalry)		L 18–28	8,526	
October 19	at Colorado State	Hughes Stadium; Fort Collins, CO		L 13–36	27,041	
November 2	San Diego State^{†}	Spartan Stadium; San Jose, CA	ABC	L 20–49	11,483	
November 9	at Hawaii	Aloha Stadium; Halawa, HI (rivalry)		W 38–17	30,300	
November 16	at No. 15 Washington*	Husky Stadium; Seattle, WA		L 10–53	70,063	
November 23	UNLV	Spartan Stadium; San Jose, CA		W 31–28	7,358	
*Non-conference game; ^{†}Homecoming; Rankings from AP Poll released prior to the game

== Game summaries ==
=== At Air Force ===
	1	2	3	4	Total
Spartans	0	0	0	0	0
Falcons					0

=== California ===
	1	2	3	4	Total
Golden Bears					0
Spartans					0

=== At Stanford ===
	1	2	3	4	Total
Spartans					0
Cardinal					0

=== UTEP ===
	1	2	3	4	Total
Miners					0
Spartans					0

=== At Washington State ===
	1	2	3	4	Total
Spartans					0
Cougars					0

=== No. 25 Wyoming ===
	1	2	3	4	Total
No. 25 Cowboys					0
Spartans					0

=== At Fresno State ===
	1	2	3	4	Total
Spartans					0
Bulldogs					0

=== At Colorado State ===
	1	2	3	4	Total
Spartans					0
Rams					0

=== San Diego State ===
	1	2	3	4	Total
Aztecs					0
Spartans					0

=== At Hawaii ===
	1	2	3	4	Total
Spartans					0
Rainbow Warriors					0

=== At No. 15 Washington ===
	1	2	3	4	Total
Spartans					0
No. 15 Huskies					0

=== UNLV ===
	1	2	3	4	Total
Rebels					0
Spartans					0

== Roster ==
1996 San Jose State Spartans football team roster
Players
Coaches
Offense

Pos.	#	Name	Class
WR	81	Windrell Hayes	So
OT	75	Scott Herzing	So
FB	28	James Hodgins	So

Defense

Pos.	#	Name	Class

Special teams

Pos.	#	Name	Class

Head coach

- John Ralston

Coordinators/assistant coaches

Legend

- (C) Team captain
- (S) Suspended
- (I) Ineligible
- Injured
- Redshirt

Roster
