= 1996 TCU Horned Frogs football team =

American college football season

1996 TCU Horned Frogs football
- Conference: Western Athletic Conference
- Mountain Division
- Record: 4–7 (3–5 WAC)
- Head coach: Pat Sullivan (5th season)
- Offensive coordinator: Pete Hoener (5th season)
- Defensive coordinator: Pat Henderson (3rd season)
- Home stadium: Amon G. Carter Stadium

1996 Western Athletic Conference football standings
	Conf.			Overall
Team	W		L	W		L
Mountain Division
No. 5 BYU x$	8	–	0	14	–	1
Utah	6	–	2	8	–	4
Rice	6	–	2	7	–	4
SMU	4	–	4	5	–	6
New Mexico	3	–	5	6	–	5
TCU	3	–	5	4	–	7
Tulsa	2	–	6	4	–	7
UTEP	0	–	8	2	–	9
Pacific Division
No. 22 Wyoming x	7	–	1	10	–	2
San Diego State	6	–	2	8	–	3
Colorado State	6	–	2	7	–	5
Air Force	5	–	3	6	–	5
Fresno State	3	–	5	4	–	7
San Jose State	3	–	5	3	–	9
Hawaii	1	–	7	2	–	10
UNLV	1	–	7	1	–	11
Championship: BYU 28, Wyoming 25 ^{OT}
$ – Conference champion; x – Division champion/co-champions; Rankings from AP Poll

The 1996 TCU Horned Frogs football team represented Texas Christian University (TCU) in the 1996 NCAA Division I-A football season. The Horned Frogs finished the season 4–7 overall and 3–5 in the Western Athletic Conference. The team was coached by Pat Sullivan, in his fifth year as head coach. The Frogs played their home games in Amon G. Carter Stadium, which is located on campus in Fort Worth, Texas.

== Schedule ==
Date	Time	Opponent	Site	TV	Result	Attendance	Source
September 7	2:30 p.m.	at Oklahoma*	Oklahoma Memorial Stadium; Norman, OK	ABC	W 20–7	65,569	
September 14	8:00 p.m.	No. 24 Kansas*	Amon G. Carter Stadium; Fort Worth, TX	ESPN2	L 17–52	37,512	
September 28		at New Mexico	University Stadium; Albuquerque, NM		L 7–27		
October 5		at Tulane*	Louisiana Superdome; New Orleans, LA		L 7–35	14,341	
October 12		UTEP	Amon G. Carter Stadium; Fort Worth, TX		W 18–0		
October 19	12::00 p.m.	at No. 24 Utah	Robert Rice Stadium; Salt Lake City, UT		L 7–21	28,786	
October 26	1:00 p.m.	No. 15 BYU	Amon G. Carter Stadium; Fort Worth, TX	KSL-TV	L 21–45	28,961	
November 2		UNLV	Amon G. Carter Stadium; Fort Worth, TX		W 42–34		
November 9		at Tulsa	Skelly Stadium; Tulsa, OK		W 31–24	17,203	
November 16		Rice	Amon G. Carter Stadium; Fort Worth, TX		L 17–30		
November 20	8:00 p.m.	vs. SMU	Cotton Bowl; Dallas, TX (rivalry)	ESPN	L 24–27	21,141	
*Non-conference game; Rankings from AP Poll released prior to the game; All times are in Central time
