= 1996 San Diego State Aztecs football team =

American college football season

1996 San Diego State Aztecs football
- Conference: Western Athletic Conference
- Pacific Division
- Record: 8–3 (6–2 WAC)
- Head coach: Ted Tollner (3rd season)
- Offensive coordinator: Tom Craft (3rd season)
- Offensive scheme: Spread
- Defensive coordinator: Claude Gilbert (6th season)
- Base defense: 4–3
- Home stadium: Jack Murphy Stadium

1996 Western Athletic Conference football standings
	Conf.			Overall
Team	W		L	W		L
Mountain Division
No. 5 BYU x$	8	–	0	14	–	1
Utah	6	–	2	8	–	4
Rice	6	–	2	7	–	4
SMU	4	–	4	5	–	6
New Mexico	3	–	5	6	–	5
TCU	3	–	5	4	–	7
Tulsa	2	–	6	4	–	7
UTEP	0	–	8	2	–	9
Pacific Division
No. 22 Wyoming x	7	–	1	10	–	2
San Diego State	6	–	2	8	–	3
Colorado State	6	–	2	7	–	5
Air Force	5	–	3	6	–	5
Fresno State	3	–	5	4	–	7
San Jose State	3	–	5	3	–	9
Hawaii	1	–	7	2	–	10
UNLV	1	–	7	1	–	11
Championship: BYU 28, Wyoming 25 ^{OT}
$ – Conference champion; x – Division champion/co-champions; Rankings from AP Poll

The 1996 San Diego State Aztecs football team represented San Diego State University as a member of the Pacific Division of the Western Athletic Conference (WAC) during the 1996 NCAA Division I-A football season. Led by third-year head coach Ted Tollner, the Aztecs compiled an overall record of 8–3 with a mark of 6–2 conference play, tying for second place in the WAC's Pacific Division. The team played home games at Jack Murphy Stadium in San Diego.

== Schedule ==
Date	Opponent	Site	TV	Result	Attendance
September 7	Idaho*	Jack Murphy Stadium; San Diego, CA		W 40–21	29,449
September 14	at California*	California Memorial Stadium; Berkeley, CA		L 37–42	37,000
September 21	Oklahoma*	Jack Murphy Stadium; San Diego, CA		W 51–31	34,812
October 11	Hawaii	Jack Murphy Stadium; San Diego, CA		W 56–8	27,098
October 19	at New Mexico	University Stadium; Albuquerque, NM		W 48–42	27,444
October 26	at Colorado State	Hughes Stadium; Fort Collins, CO	PSN	L 18–27	25,013
November 2	at San Jose State	Spartan Stadium; San Jose, CA	ABC	W 49–20	11,483
November 7	No. 16 Wyoming	Jack Murphy Stadium; San Diego, CA	ESPN	W 28–24	28,679
November 16	at UNLV	Sam Boyd Stadium; Whitney, NV	Fox West	L 42–44	11,594
November 23	Fresno State^{†}	Jack Murphy Stadium; San Diego, CA (rivalry)		W 31–21	32,107
November 28	Air Force	Jack Murphy Stadium; San Diego, CA	ESPN2	W 28–23	18,353
*Non-conference game; ^{†}Homecoming; Rankings from AP Poll released prior to the game

== Team players in the NFL ==
The following were selected in the 1997 NFL draft.

Player	Position	Round	Overall	NFL team
Will Blackwell	Wide receiver	2	53	Pittsburgh Steelers
Nate Jacquet	Wide receiver	5	150	Indianapolis Colts
George Jones	Running back	5	154	Pittsburgh Steelers
Ricky Parker	Defensive back	6	201	Chicago Bears

The following finished their college career in 1996, were not drafted, but played in the NFL.

Player	Position	First NFL team
Obafemi Ayanbadejo	Running back	1998 Minnesota Vikings

== Team awards ==
Award	Player
Most Valuable Player (John Simcox Memorial Trophy)	Billy Blanton
Outstanding Players (Byron H. Chase Memorial Trophy)	Kyle Turley, OT; Adriam Ioja, DE; George Jones, RB; Will Blackwell, WR; Craigus Thompson, LB; Jason Moore, DB
Team captains Dr. R. Hardy / C.E. Peterson Memorial Trophy	Billy Blanton, Off; Adrian Ioja, Def; Craigus Thompson, Def; Freddie Edwards, Special Teams
Most Inspirational Player	Craigus Thompson
