= 1996 UNLV Rebels football team =

American college football season

1996 UNLV Rebels football
- Conference: Western Athletic Conference
- Pacific Division
- Record: 1–11 (1–7 WAC)
- Head coach: Jeff Horton (3rd season)
- Offensive coordinator: Charlie Stubbs (1st season)
- Defensive coordinator: Stan Eggen (3rd season)
- Home stadium: Sam Boyd Stadium

1996 Western Athletic Conference football standings
	Conf.			Overall
Team	W		L	W		L
Mountain Division
No. 5 BYU x$	8	–	0	14	–	1
Utah	6	–	2	8	–	4
Rice	6	–	2	7	–	4
SMU	4	–	4	5	–	6
New Mexico	3	–	5	6	–	5
TCU	3	–	5	4	–	7
Tulsa	2	–	6	4	–	7
UTEP	0	–	8	2	–	9
Pacific Division
No. 22 Wyoming x	7	–	1	10	–	2
San Diego State	6	–	2	8	–	3
Colorado State	6	–	2	7	–	5
Air Force	5	–	3	6	–	5
Fresno State	3	–	5	4	–	7
San Jose State	3	–	5	3	–	9
Hawaii	1	–	7	2	–	10
UNLV	1	–	7	1	–	11
Championship: BYU 28, Wyoming 25 ^{OT}
$ – Conference champion; x – Division champion/co-champions; Rankings from AP Poll

The 1996 UNLV Rebels football team was an American football team that represented the University of Nevada, Las Vegas (UNLV) as a member of the Western Athletic Conference (WAC) during the 1996 NCAA Division I-A football season. In their third year under head coach Jeff Horton, the Rebels compiled an overall record of 1–11 with mark of 1–7 in conference play, tying for seventh place at the bottom of the standings in the WAC's Pacific Division. The team played home games at Sam Boyd Stadium in Whitney, Nevada.

== Schedule ==
Date	Opponent	Site	Result	Attendance	Source
August 31	at No. 2 Tennessee*	Neyland Stadium; Knoxville, TN	L 3–62	106,212	
September 7	Air Force	Sam Boyd Stadium; Whitney, NV	L 17–66	22,945	
September 14	Wisconsin*	Sam Boyd Stadium; Whitney, NV	L 17–52	40,091	
September 21	at Colorado State	Hughes Stadium; Fort Collins, CO	L 16–35	24,011	
September 28	Wyoming	Sam Boyd Stadium; Whitney, NV	L 21–33	12,564	
October 5	Nevada*	Sam Boyd Stadium; Whitney, NV (Fremont Cannon)	L 17–54	20,230	
October 12	at No. 19 BYU*	Cougar Stadium; Provo, UT	L 28–63	64,872	
October 19	at Hawaii	Aloha Stadium; Halawa, HI	L 28–38	29,536	
October 26	Fresno State	Sam Boyd Stadium; Whitney, NV	L 23–34	11,319	
November 2	at TCU	Amon G. Carter Stadium; Fort Worth, TX	L 34–42	27,047	
November 16	San Diego State	Sam Boyd Stadium; Whitney, NV	W 44–42	11,594	
November 23	at San Jose State	Spartan Stadium; San Jose, CA	L 28–31	7,358	
*Non-conference game; Rankings from Coaches' Poll released prior to the game
