= 1996 Fresno State Bulldogs football team =

American college football season

1996 Fresno State Bulldogs football
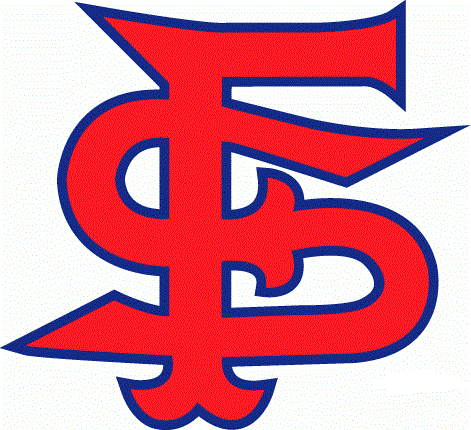
- Conference: Western Athletic Conference
- Pacific Division
- Record: 4–7 (3–5 WAC)
- Head coach: Jim Sweeney (19th season)
- Offensive coordinator: Jeff Tedford (4th season)
- Defensive coordinator: Robin Ross (1st season)
- Home stadium: Bulldog Stadium

1996 Western Athletic Conference football standings
	Conf.			Overall
Team	W		L	W		L
Mountain Division
No. 5 BYU x$	8	–	0	14	–	1
Utah	6	–	2	8	–	4
Rice	6	–	2	7	–	4
SMU	4	–	4	5	–	6
New Mexico	3	–	5	6	–	5
TCU	3	–	5	4	–	7
Tulsa	2	–	6	4	–	7
UTEP	0	–	8	2	–	9
Pacific Division
No. 22 Wyoming x	7	–	1	10	–	2
San Diego State	6	–	2	8	–	3
Colorado State	6	–	2	7	–	5
Air Force	5	–	3	6	–	5
Fresno State	3	–	5	4	–	7
San Jose State	3	–	5	3	–	9
Hawaii	1	–	7	2	–	10
UNLV	1	–	7	1	–	11
Championship: BYU 28, Wyoming 25 ^{OT}
$ – Conference champion; x – Division champion/co-champions; Rankings from AP Poll

The 1996 Fresno State Bulldogs football team represented California State University, Fresno as a member of the Pacific Division of the Western Athletic Conference (WAC) during the 1996 NCAA Division I-A football season. Led by Jim Sweeney in his 19th and final season as head coach, Fresno State compiled an overall record of 4–7 with a mark of 3–5 in conference play, tying for fifth place in the WAC's Pacific Division. The Bulldogs played their home games at Bulldog Stadium in Fresno, California.

== Schedule ==
Date	Opponent	Site	Result	Attendance
August 31	Oregon*	Bulldog Stadium; Fresno, CA	L 27–30 ^{OT}	39,312
September 7	at No. 18 Auburn*	Jordan–Hare Stadium; Auburn, AL	L 0–62	79,026
September 21	at Utah*	Robert Rice Stadium; Salt Lake City, UT	L 17–45	32,539
September 28	Hawaii	Bulldog Stadium; Fresno, CA (rivalry)	W 20–0	36,428
October 12	San Jose State*	Bulldog Stadium; Fresno, CA (rivalry)	W 28–18	38,276
October 19	at No. 23 Wyoming	War Memorial Stadium; Laramie, WY	L 21–42	14,446
October 26	at UNLV	Sam Boyd Stadium; Whitney, NV	W 34–23	11,319
November 2	Boise State	Bulldog Stadium; Fresno, CA (rivalry)	W 41–7	36,099
November 9	Colorado State	Bulldog Stadium; Fresno, CA	L 20–42	35,009
November 16	Air Force	Bulldog Stadium; Fresno, CA	L 38–44 ^{OT}	39,112
November 23	at San Diego State	Jack Murphy Stadium; San Diego, CA (rivalry)	L 21–31	32,107
*Non-conference game; Rankings from AP Poll released prior to the game

== Roster ==
1996 Fresno State Bulldogs football team roster
Players
Coaches
Offense

Pos.	#	Name	Class
G	73	Donte Addision	So
TE	87	Chris Alex	Fr
QB	16	Jim Arellanes	Sr
OT	78	Chris Conrad	Jr
QB	10	Richie Donati	Sr
WR	22	Corey Fields	Jr
FB	43	Grant Parnagian	Jr
TB	4	Michael Pittman	Jr
RB	34	Jaime Kimbrough	So

Defense

Pos.	#	Name	Class
LB	47	Joe Barnes	Jr
LB	20	Chris Bayne	Sr
CB	7	Mustafah Muhammad	Sr
DE	54	Ryan Negrete	Jr
DT	93	Bryan Robinson	Sr
SS	5	Omar Stoutmire	Sr
CB	2	Rio Wells	Sr

Special teams

Pos.	#	Name	Class

Head coach

- Jim Sweeney

Coordinators/assistant coaches

Legend

- (C) Team captain
- (S) Suspended
- (I) Ineligible
- Injured
- Redshirt

Roster

== Team players in the NFL ==
The following were selected in the 1997 NFL draft.

Player	Position	Round	Overall	NFL team
Chris Bayne	Defensive back	7	222	Atlanta Falcons
Omar Stoutmire	Defensive back	7	224	Dallas Cowboys

The following finished their college career in 1996, were not drafted, but played in the NFL.

Player	Position	First NFL team
Bryan Robinson	Defensive tackle, defensive end	1997 St. Louis Rams
Mustafah Muhammad	Defensive back	1999 Indianapolis Colts
