= 1996 Colorado State Rams football team =

American college football season

1996 Colorado State Rams football
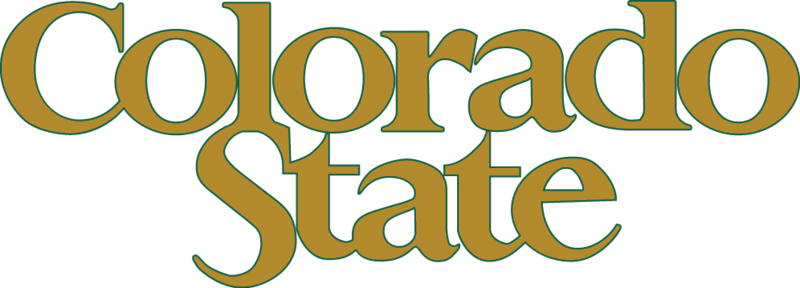
- Conference: Western Athletic Conference
- Pacific Division
- Record: 7–5 (6–2 WAC)
- Head coach: Sonny Lubick (4th season)
- Offensive coordinator: Dave Lay (6th season)
- Defensive coordinator: Larry Kerr (4th season)
- Home stadium: Hughes Stadium

1996 Western Athletic Conference football standings
| | Conf. | | | Overall |
| Team | W | | L | W | | L |
|---|---|---|---|---|---|---|
Mountain Division
| No. 5 BYU x$ | 8 | – | 0 | 14 | – | 1 |
| Utah | 6 | – | 2 | 8 | – | 4 |
| Rice | 6 | – | 2 | 7 | – | 4 |
| SMU | 4 | – | 4 | 5 | – | 6 |
| New Mexico | 3 | – | 5 | 6 | – | 5 |
| TCU | 3 | – | 5 | 4 | – | 7 |
| Tulsa | 2 | – | 6 | 4 | – | 7 |
| UTEP | 0 | – | 8 | 2 | – | 9 |
Pacific Division
| No. 22 Wyoming x | 7 | – | 1 | 10 | – | 2 |
| San Diego State | 6 | – | 2 | 8 | – | 3 |
| Colorado State | 6 | – | 2 | 7 | – | 5 |
| Air Force | 5 | – | 3 | 6 | – | 5 |
| Fresno State | 3 | – | 5 | 4 | – | 7 |
| San Jose State | 3 | – | 5 | 3 | – | 9 |
| Hawaii | 1 | – | 7 | 2 | – | 10 |
| UNLV | 1 | – | 7 | 1 | – | 11 |
Championship: BYU 28, Wyoming 25 ^{OT}
$ – Conference champion; x – Division champion/co-champions; Rankings from AP Poll

The 1996 Colorado State Rams football team represented Colorado State University as a member of the Western Athletic Conference (WAC) during the 1996 NCAA Division I-A football season. Led by fourth-year head coach Sonny Lubick, the Rams compiled an overall record of 7–5 with a mark of 6–2 in conference play, tying for second place in the WAC's Mountain Division. Colorado State played home games at Hughes Stadium in Fort Collins, Colorado.

== Schedule ==
| Date | Opponent | Site | Result | Attendance | Source |
|---|---|---|---|---|---|
| August 31 | Chattanooga* | Hughes Stadium; Fort Collins, CO | W 61–19 | 27,171 | |
| September 7 | No. 5 Colorado* | Hughes Stadium; Fort Collins, CO (Rocky Mountain Showdown) | L 34–48 | 36,371 | |
| September 14 | at Oregon* | Autzen Stadium; Eugene, OR | L 28–35 | 39,605 | |
| September 21 | UNLV | Hughes Stadium; Fort Collins, CO | W 35–16 | 24,011 | |
| September 28 | at No. 8 Nebraska* | Memorial Stadium; Lincoln, NE | L 9–65 | 75,575 | |
| October 5 | at Hawaii | Aloha Stadium; Halawa, HI | W 28–16 | 32,010 | |
| October 12 | at Tulsa | Skelly Stadium; Tulsa, OK | L 14–20 | 24,556 | |
| October 19 | San Jose State | Hughes Stadium; Fort Collins, CO | W 36–13 | 27,041 | |
| October 26 | San Diego State | Hughes Stadium; Fort Collins, CO | W 31–24 | 25,013 | |
| November 2 | Air Force | Falcon Stadium; Colorado Springs, CO (rivalry) | W 42–41 | 51,116 | |
| November 9 | at Fresno State | Bulldog Stadium; Fresno, CA | W 42–20 | 35,009 | |
| November 16 | at No. 23 Wyoming | Hughes Stadium; Fort Collins, CO (Border War) | L 24–25 | 33,701 | |
*Non-conference game; Rankings from AP Poll released prior to the game
