= 1996 UTEP Miners football team =

American college football season

1996 UTEP Miners football
- Conference: Western Athletic Conference
- Mountain Division
- Record: 2–9 (0–8 WAC)
- Head coach: Charlie Bailey (4th season)
- Offensive coordinator: Darrell Dickey (3rd season)
- Defensive coordinator: Ronnie Jones (1st season)
- Home stadium: Sun Bowl

1996 Western Athletic Conference football standings
	Conf.			Overall
Team	W		L	W		L
Mountain Division
No. 5 BYU x$	8	–	0	14	–	1
Utah	6	–	2	8	–	4
Rice	6	–	2	7	–	4
SMU	4	–	4	5	–	6
New Mexico	3	–	5	6	–	5
TCU	3	–	5	4	–	7
Tulsa	2	–	6	4	–	7
UTEP	0	–	8	2	–	9
Pacific Division
No. 22 Wyoming x	7	–	1	10	–	2
San Diego State	6	–	2	8	–	3
Colorado State	6	–	2	7	–	5
Air Force	5	–	3	6	–	5
Fresno State	3	–	5	4	–	7
San Jose State	3	–	5	3	–	9
Hawaii	1	–	7	2	–	10
UNLV	1	–	7	1	–	11
Championship: BYU 28, Wyoming 25 ^{OT}
$ – Conference champion; x – Division champion/co-champions; Rankings from AP Poll

The 1996 UTEP Miners football team was an American football team that represented the University of Texas at El Paso in the Western Athletic Conference during the 1996 NCAA Division I-A football season. In their fourth year under head coach Charlie Bailey, the team compiled a 2–9 record.

== Schedule ==
Date	Opponent	Site	Result	Attendance
August 31	at Arizona*	Arizona Stadium; Tucson, AZ	L 3–23	40,388
September 14	New Mexico State*	Sun Bowl; El Paso, TX (rivalry)	W 14–7	31,654
September 21	at San Jose State	Spartan Stadium; San Jose, CA	L 25–26	10,433
September 28	at Northern Illinois*	Huskie Stadium; DeKalb, IL	W 37–6	10,229
October 5	No. 24 Utah	Sun Bowl; El Paso, TX	L 27–34	28,271
October 12	at TCU	Amon G. Carter Stadium; Fort Worth, TX	L 0–18	25,384
October 26	Rice^{†}	Sun Bowl; El Paso, TX	L 21–48	19,336
November 2	at No. 13 BYU	Cougar Stadium; Provo, UT	L 18–40	64,988
November 9	SMU	Sun Bowl; El Paso, TX	L 0–30	14,590
November 16	Tulsa	Sun Bowl; El Paso, TX	L 21–38	14,293
November 23	at New Mexico	University Stadium; Albuquerque, NM	L 17–44	19,510
*Non-conference game; ^{†}Homecoming; Rankings from AP Poll released prior to the game
