= 1996 Hawaii Rainbow Warriors football team =

American college football season

1996 Hawaii Rainbow Warriors football
- Conference: Western Athletic Conference
- Record: 2–10 (1–7 WAC)
- Head coach: Fred von Appen (1st season)
- Offensive coordinator: Guy Benjamin (1st season)
- Offensive scheme: Pro-style
- Defensive coordinator: Don Lindsey (1st season)
- Base defense: 4–3
- Home stadium: Aloha Stadium

1996 Western Athletic Conference football standings
	Conf.			Overall
Team	W		L	W		L
Mountain Division
No. 5 BYU x$	8	–	0	14	–	1
Utah	6	–	2	8	–	4
Rice	6	–	2	7	–	4
SMU	4	–	4	5	–	6
New Mexico	3	–	5	6	–	5
TCU	3	–	5	4	–	7
Tulsa	2	–	6	4	–	7
UTEP	0	–	8	2	–	9
Pacific Division
No. 22 Wyoming x	7	–	1	10	–	2
San Diego State	6	–	2	8	–	3
Colorado State	6	–	2	7	–	5
Air Force	5	–	3	6	–	5
Fresno State	3	–	5	4	–	7
San Jose State	3	–	5	3	–	9
Hawaii	1	–	7	2	–	10
UNLV	1	–	7	1	–	11
Championship: BYU 28, Wyoming 25 ^{OT}
$ – Conference champion; x – Division champion/co-champions; Rankings from AP Poll

The 1996 Hawaii Rainbow Warriors football team represented the University of Hawaiʻi at Mānoa in the Western Athletic Conference during the 1996 NCAA Division I-A football season. In their first season under head coach Fred von Appen, the Rainbow Warriors compiled a 2–10 record.

== Schedule ==
Date	Opponent	Site	Result	Attendance
August 31	Boston College*	Aloha Stadium; Halawa, HI	L 21–24	37,402
September 7	Ohio*	Aloha Stadium; Halawa, HI	L 10–21	32,069
September 14	at Wyoming	War Memorial Stadium; Laramie, WY (rivalry)	L 0–66	15,182
September 21	Boise State*	Aloha Stadium; Halawa, HI	W 20–14	35,497
September 28	at Fresno State	Bulldog Stadium; Fresno, CA (rivalry)	L 0–20	36,428
October 5	Colorado State	Aloha Stadium; Halawa, HI	L 16–28	32,010
October 11	at San Diego State	Jack Murphy Stadium; San Diego, CA	L 8–56	27,098
October 19	UNLV	Aloha Stadium; Halawa, HI	W 38–28	29,536
October 26	at Air Force	Falcon Stadium; Colorado Springs, CO (rivalry)	L 7–34	36,454
November 9	San Jose State^{†}	Aloha Stadium; Halawa, HI (Dick Tomey Legacy Game)	L 17–38	30,300
November 16	No. 10 BYU	Aloha Stadium; Halawa, HI	L 14–45	32,445
November 30	Wisconsin*	Aloha Stadium; Halawa, HI	L 10–59	34,727
*Non-conference game; ^{†}Homecoming; Rankings from AP Poll released prior to the game
