= 1996 New Mexico Lobos football team =

American college football season

1996 New Mexico Lobos football
- Conference: Western Athletic Conference
- Mountain Division
- Record: 6–5 (3–5 WAC)
- Head coach: Dennis Franchione (5th season)
- Offensive coordinator: Dennis Darnell (3rd season)
- Offensive scheme: Multiple
- Defensive coordinator: Gary Patterson (1st season)
- Base defense: 4–2–5
- Home stadium: University Stadium

1996 Western Athletic Conference football standings
	Conf.			Overall
Team	W		L	W		L
Mountain Division
No. 5 BYU x$	8	–	0	14	–	1
Utah	6	–	2	8	–	4
Rice	6	–	2	7	–	4
SMU	4	–	4	5	–	6
New Mexico	3	–	5	6	–	5
TCU	3	–	5	4	–	7
Tulsa	2	–	6	4	–	7
UTEP	0	–	8	2	–	9
Pacific Division
No. 22 Wyoming x	7	–	1	10	–	2
San Diego State	6	–	2	8	–	3
Colorado State	6	–	2	7	–	5
Air Force	5	–	3	6	–	5
Fresno State	3	–	5	4	–	7
San Jose State	3	–	5	3	–	9
Hawaii	1	–	7	2	–	10
UNLV	1	–	7	1	–	11
Championship: BYU 28, Wyoming 25 ^{OT}
$ – Conference champion; x – Division champion/co-champions; Rankings from AP Poll

The 1996 New Mexico Lobos football team was an American football team that represented the University of New Mexico in the Western Athletic Conference (WAC) during the 1996 NCAA Division I-A football season. In their fifth season under head coach Dennis Franchione, the Lobos compiled a 6–5 record (3–5 against WAC opponents) and outscored opponents by a total of 331 to 280. The team's statistical leaders included Donald Sellers with 2,048 passing yards, Lennox Gordon with 1,008 rushing yards, Jeremy Banks with 538 receiving yards, and kicker Colby Cason with 62 points scored.

== Schedule ==
Date	Opponent	Site	Result	Attendance	Source
August 29	at New Mexico State*	Aggie Memorial Stadium; Las Cruces, NM (Rio Grande Rivalry)	W 28–7		
September 7	Northern Arizona*	University Stadium; Albuquerque, NM	W 49–33	24,892	
September 14	UCF*	University Stadium; Albuquerque, NM	W 17–7	18,317	
September 21	at BYU	Cougar Stadium; Provo, UT	L 14–17	63,587	
September 28	TCU^{†}	University Stadium; Albuquerque, NM	W 27–7		
October 5	at Rice	Rice Stadium; Houston, TX	L 21–38		
October 19	San Diego State	University Stadium; Albuquerque, NM	L 42–48	27,444	
October 26	at SMU	Cotton Bowl; Dallas, YX	L 31–52	24,024	
November 2	at Tulsa	Skelly Stadium; Tulsa, OK	W 34–23	19,897	
November 9	Utah	University Stadium; Albuquerque, NM	L 24–31	22,241	
November 23	UTEP	University Stadium; Albuquerque, NM	W 44–17	19,510	
*Non-conference game; ^{†}Homecoming

== Roster ==
1996 New Mexico Lobos football team roster
Players
Coaches
Offense

Pos.	#	Name	Class

Defense

Pos.	#	Name	Class
WS	6	Scott McGarrahan	Jr
SS, P	10	Danny Gonzales	So
FS	16	Billy Austin	Jr
LB	23	Brian Urlacher	Fr

Special teams

Pos.	#	Name	Class

Head coach

- Dennis Franchione

Coordinators/assistant coaches

Legend

- (C) Team captain
- (S) Suspended
- (I) Ineligible
- Injured
- Redshirt

Roster
Last update: 1996-12-23
