= 1996 Tulsa Golden Hurricane football team =

American college football season

1996 Tulsa Golden Hurricane football
- Conference: Western Athletic Conference
- Mountain Division
- Record: 4–7 (2–6 WAC)
- Head coach: David Rader (9th season)
- Offensive coordinator: Mark Thomas (4th season)
- Defensive coordinator: Mike Knoll (8th season)
- Home stadium: Skelly Stadium

1996 Western Athletic Conference football standings
	Conf.			Overall
Team	W		L	W		L
Mountain Division
No. 5 BYU x$	8	–	0	14	–	1
Utah	6	–	2	8	–	4
Rice	6	–	2	7	–	4
SMU	4	–	4	5	–	6
New Mexico	3	–	5	6	–	5
TCU	3	–	5	4	–	7
Tulsa	2	–	6	4	–	7
UTEP	0	–	8	2	–	9
Pacific Division
No. 22 Wyoming x	7	–	1	10	–	2
San Diego State	6	–	2	8	–	3
Colorado State	6	–	2	7	–	5
Air Force	5	–	3	6	–	5
Fresno State	3	–	5	4	–	7
San Jose State	3	–	5	3	–	9
Hawaii	1	–	7	2	–	10
UNLV	1	–	7	1	–	11
Championship: BYU 28, Wyoming 25 ^{OT}
$ – Conference champion; x – Division champion/co-champions; Rankings from AP Poll

The 1996 Tulsa Golden Hurricane football team represented the University of Tulsa during the 1996 NCAA Division I-A football season. In their ninth year under head coach David Rader, the Golden Hurricane compiled a 4–7 record. In the team's first season as members of the Western Athletic Conference the team finished seventh in the Mountain Divsision with a 2–6 conference record. The team's statistical leaders included quarterback Troy DeGar with 1,336 passing yards, Reggie Williams with 759 rushing yards, and Wes Caswell with 817 receiving yards.

== Schedule ==
Date	Time	Opponent	Site	TV	Result	Attendance
August 31		at SMU	Cotton Bowl; Dallas, TX		L 10–17	12,177
September 14	6:00 p.m.	at Oklahoma State*	Lewis Field; Stillwater, OK (rivalry)		L 9–30	44,800
September 21		No. 19 Iowa*	Skelly Stadium; Tulsa, OK	ESPN Plus	W 27–20	27,788
September 28		at Oklahoma*	Oklahoma Memorial Stadium; Norman, OK		W 31–24	68,384
October 12		Colorado State	Skelly Stadium; Tulsa, OK		W 20–14	24,556
October 19		No. 18 BYU^{†}	Skelly Stadium; Tulsa, OK	ESPN2	L 30–55	34,624
October 26		at No. 21 Utah	Rice Stadium; Salt Lake City, UT		L 19–45	29,047
November 2		New Mexico	Skelly Stadium; Tulsa, OK		L 23–34	19,897
November 9		TCU	Skelly Stadium; Tulsa, OK		L 24–31	17,203
November 16		at UTEP	Sun Bowl; El Paso, TX		W 38–21	14,293
November 23		at Rice	Rice Stadium; Houston, TX		L 14–42	19,200
*Non-conference game; ^{†}Homecoming; Rankings from AP Poll released prior to the game; All times are in Central time

== After the season ==
=== 1997 NFL draft ===
The following Golden Hurricane player was selected in the 1997 NFL draft following the season.

Round	Pick	Player	Position	NFL club
6	179	Muadianvita Kazadi	Linebacker	St. Louis Rams
