= 1996 Utah Utes football team =

American college football season

1996 Utah Utes football

Copper Bowl, L 10–38 vs. Wisconsin
- Conference: Western Athletic Conference
- Mountain Division
- Record: 8–4 (6–2 WAC)
- Head coach: Ron McBride (7th season)
- Offensive coordinator: Fred Graves (2nd season)
- Offensive scheme: Pro-style
- Defensive coordinator: Kyle Whittingham (2nd season)
- Base defense: 4–3
- Home stadium: Robert Rice Stadium

1996 Western Athletic Conference football standings
	Conf.			Overall
Team	W		L	W		L
Mountain Division
No. 5 BYU x$	8	–	0	14	–	1
Utah	6	–	2	8	–	4
Rice	6	–	2	7	–	4
SMU	4	–	4	5	–	6
New Mexico	3	–	5	6	–	5
TCU	3	–	5	4	–	7
Tulsa	2	–	6	4	–	7
UTEP	0	–	8	2	–	9
Pacific Division
No. 22 Wyoming x	7	–	1	10	–	2
San Diego State	6	–	2	8	–	3
Colorado State	6	–	2	7	–	5
Air Force	5	–	3	6	–	5
Fresno State	3	–	5	4	–	7
San Jose State	3	–	5	3	–	9
Hawaii	1	–	7	2	–	10
UNLV	1	–	7	1	–	11
Championship: BYU 28, Wyoming 25 ^{OT}
$ – Conference champion; x – Division champion/co-champions; Rankings from AP Poll

The 1996 Utah Utes football team represented the University of Utah as a member of the Mountain Division of the Western Athletic Conference (WAC) during the 1996 NCAA Division I-A football season. In their seventh season under head coach Ron McBride, the Utes compiled an overall record of 8–4 record with a mark of 6–2 against conference opponents, tying for second place in the WAC's Mountain Division. Utah was invited the Copper Bowl, where they lost to Wisconsin. The Utes outscored their opponents 313 to 309. The team played home games at Robert Rice Stadium in Salt Lake City.

Utah open the season with a loss at Utah State, but won the next seven game and climbed to a No. 20 ranking in the AP Poll. The winning-streak came to a halt when the Utes suffered their worst loss in six years, to the Rice Owls, giving up 496 yards rushing. Utah lost three of their final four games, allowing a total 1,439 yards rushing in these four games (359.75 average per game), including a 38–10 loss to the Wisconsin in the Copper Bowl.

== Schedule ==
Date	Time	Opponent	Rank	Site	TV	Result	Attendance
August 31	7:00 pm	at Utah State*		Romney Stadium; Logan, UT (Battle of the Brothers)		L 17–20	30,257
September 7	5:00 pm	at Stanford*		Stanford Stadium; Stanford, CA	ABC	W 17–10	34,587
September 14	6:00 pm	at SMU		Ownby Stadium; Dallas, TX	KJZZ	W 21–17	22,614
September 21	7:00 pm	Fresno State		Robert Rice Stadium; Salt Lake City, UT		W 45–17	32,539
September 28	7:00 pm	No. 20 Kansas*		Rice Stadium; Salt Lake City, UT	ESPN2	W 45–42	32,519
October 5	1:00 pm	at UTEP	No. 24	Sun Bowl; El Paso, TX		W 34–27	28,271
October 19	12:00 pm	TCU	No. 24	Rice Stadium; Salt Lake City, UT		W 21–7	28,786
October 26	12:00 pm	Tulsa^{†}	No. 21	Rice Stadium; Salt Lake City, UT		W 45–19	29,047
November 2	1:00 pm	at Rice	No. 20	Rice Stadium; Houston, TX		L 10–51	23,250
November 9	8:00 pm	at New Mexico		University Stadium; Albuquerque, NM	ESPN2	W 31–24	22,241
November 23	10:30 am	No. 8 BYU		Rice Stadium; Salt Lake City, UT (Holy War)	ESPN	L 17–37	35,378
December 27	7:00 pm	vs. Wisconsin*		Arizona Stadium; Tucson, AZ (Copper Bowl)	ESPN	L 10–38	42,122
*Non-conference game; ^{†}Homecoming; Rankings from AP Poll released prior to the game; All times are in Mountain time

== Rankings ==
Ranking movements Legend: ██ Increase in ranking ██ Decrease in ranking — = Not ranked
	Week																	
Poll	Pre	1	2	3	4	5	6	7	8	9	10	11	12	13	14	15	16	Final
AP	—	—	—	—	—	—	24	—	24	21	20	—	—	—	—	—	—	—
Coaches	—		—	—	—	—	24	—	25	22	19	—	—	—	—	—	—	—

== Roster ==
1996 Utah Utes football team roster
Players
Coaches
Offense

Pos.	#	Name	Class
WR	1	Kevin Dyson	Jr
WR	11	David Kozlowski	Sr

Defense

Pos.	#	Name	Class
DL		Richard Seals

Special teams

Pos.	#	Name	Class

Head coach

- Ron McBride

Coordinators/assistant coaches

Legend

- (C) Team captain
- (S) Suspended
- (I) Ineligible
- Injured
- Redshirt

== CFL draft ==
Chad Folk was selected first overall in the 1997 CFL draft.
