= 1996 Rice Owls football team =

American college football season

1996 Rice Owls football
- Conference: Western Athletic Conference
- Mountain Division
- Record: 7–4 (6–2 WAC)
- Head coach: Ken Hatfield (3rd season)
- Offensive coordinator: David Lee (3rd season)
- Defensive coordinator: Wally Ake (3rd season)
- Home stadium: Rice Stadium

1996 Western Athletic Conference football standings
	Conf.			Overall
Team	W		L	W		L
Mountain Division
No. 5 BYU x$	8	–	0	14	–	1
Utah	6	–	2	8	–	4
Rice	6	–	2	7	–	4
SMU	4	–	4	5	–	6
New Mexico	3	–	5	6	–	5
TCU	3	–	5	4	–	7
Tulsa	2	–	6	4	–	7
UTEP	0	–	8	2	–	9
Pacific Division
No. 22 Wyoming x	7	–	1	10	–	2
San Diego State	6	–	2	8	–	3
Colorado State	6	–	2	7	–	5
Air Force	5	–	3	6	–	5
Fresno State	3	–	5	4	–	7
San Jose State	3	–	5	3	–	9
Hawaii	1	–	7	2	–	10
UNLV	1	–	7	1	–	11
Championship: BYU 28, Wyoming 25 ^{OT}
$ – Conference champion; x – Division champion/co-champions; Rankings from AP Poll

The 1996 Rice Owls football team was an American football team that represented Rice University in the Western Athletic Conference during the 1996 NCAA Division I-A football season. In their third year under head coach Ken Hatfield, the team compiled a 7–4 record.

== Schedule ==
Date	Opponent	Site	Result	Attendance	Source
September 7	at No. 10 Ohio State*	Ohio Stadium; Columbus, OH	L 7–70	93,479	
September 14	at Tulane*	Louisiana Superdome; New Orleans, LA	W 21–14	38,839	
September 21	No. 16 Kansas State*	Rice Stadium; Houston, TX	L 7–34	19,700	
September 28	at Air Force	Falcon Stadium; Colorado Springs, CO	L 17–45		
October 5	New Mexico	Rice Stadium; Houston, TX	W 38–21		
October 19	SMU	Rice Stadium; Houston, TX (rivalry)	W 35–17	20,100	
October 26	at UTEP	Sun Bowl; El Paso, TX	W 48–21	19,336	
November 2	No. 20 Utah	Rice Stadium; Houston, TX	W 51–10	23,250	
November 9	at No. 12 BYU	Cougar Stadium; Provo, UT	L 0–49	65,732	
November 16	at TCU	Amon G. Carter Stadium; Fort Worth, TX	W 30–17		
November 23	Tulsa	Rice Stadium; Houston, TX	W 42–14	19,200	
*Non-conference game; Rankings from AP Poll released prior to the game
