= 1996 SMU Mustangs football team =

American college football season

1996 SMU Mustangs football
- Conference: Western Athletic Conference
- Mountain Division
- Record: 5–6 (4–4 WAC)
- Head coach: Tom Rossley (6th season)
- Offensive coordinator: Clovis Hale (2nd season)
- Offensive scheme: Run and shoot
- Defensive coordinator: David Knaus (2nd season)
- Base defense: 4–3
- Home stadium: Cotton Bowl

1996 Western Athletic Conference football standings
| | Conf. | | | Overall |
| Team | W | | L | W | | L |
|---|---|---|---|---|---|---|
Mountain Division
| No. 5 BYU x$ | 8 | – | 0 | 14 | – | 1 |
| Utah | 6 | – | 2 | 8 | – | 4 |
| Rice | 6 | – | 2 | 7 | – | 4 |
| SMU | 4 | – | 4 | 5 | – | 6 |
| New Mexico | 3 | – | 5 | 6 | – | 5 |
| TCU | 3 | – | 5 | 4 | – | 7 |
| Tulsa | 2 | – | 6 | 4 | – | 7 |
| UTEP | 0 | – | 8 | 2 | – | 9 |
Pacific Division
| No. 22 Wyoming x | 7 | – | 1 | 10 | – | 2 |
| San Diego State | 6 | – | 2 | 8 | – | 3 |
| Colorado State | 6 | – | 2 | 7 | – | 5 |
| Air Force | 5 | – | 3 | 6 | – | 5 |
| Fresno State | 3 | – | 5 | 4 | – | 7 |
| San Jose State | 3 | – | 5 | 3 | – | 9 |
| Hawaii | 1 | – | 7 | 2 | – | 10 |
| UNLV | 1 | – | 7 | 1 | – | 11 |
Championship: BYU 28, Wyoming 25 ^{OT}
$ – Conference champion; x – Division champion/co-champions; Rankings from AP Poll

The 1996 SMU Mustangs football team represented Southern Methodist University (SMU) as a member of the Mountain Division of the Western Athletic Conference (WAC) during the 1996 NCAA Division I-A football season. Led by Tom Rossley in his sixth and final season as head coach, the Mustangs compiled an overall record of 5–6 with a mark of 4–4 in conference play, placing fourth in the WAC's Mountain Division. This was SMU's first season as a member of the WAC after playing in the Southwest Conference (SWC) since 1918.

== Schedule ==
| Date | Time | Opponent | Site | TV | Result | Attendance | Source |
|---|---|---|---|---|---|---|---|
| August 31 | 7:00 p.m. | Tulsa | Cotton Bowl; Dallas, TX | | W 17–10 | 12,177 | |
| September 7 | 2:00 p.m. | at Arkansas* | Razorback Stadium; Fayetteville, AR | | W 23–10 | 44,695 | |
| September 14 | 7:00 p.m. | Utah | Cotton Bowl; Dallas, TX | | L 17–21 | 22,614 | |
| September 21 | 6:00 p.m. | at Navy* | Navy–Marine Corps Memorial Stadium; Annapolis, MD | | L 17–19 | 26,798 | |
| September 28 | 1:00 p.m. | at No. 24 BYU | Cougar Stadium; Provo, UT | | L 3–31 | 62,537 | |
| October 5 | 7:00 p.m. | Missouri* | Cotton Bowl; Dallas, TX | | L 26–27 | 23,132 | |
| October 19 | 2:00 p.m. | at Rice | Rice Stadium; Houston, TX (rivalry) | | L 17–35 | 20,100 | |
| October 26 | 7:00 p.m. | New Mexico | Cotton Bowl; Dallas, TX | | W 52–31 | 24,024 | |
| November 2 | 2:00 p.m. | at No. 17 Wyoming | War Memorial Stadium; Laramie, WY | | L 17–59 | 17,268 | |
| November 9 | 8:00 p.m. | at UTEP | Sun Bowl Stadium; El Paso, TX | | W 30–0 | 14,590 | |
| November 21 | 8:00 p.m. | TCU | Cotton Bowl; Dallas, TX (rivalry) | ESPN | W 27–24 | 21,141 | |
*Non-conference game; Rankings from AP Poll released prior to the game; All times are in Central time

== Roster ==
1996 SMU Mustangs football team roster
Players
Coaches
Offense

| Pos. | # | Name | Class |
|---|---|---|---|
| C | 70 | Austin Adami | So |
| RB | 21 | Kelsey Adams | So |
| QB | 8 | Ramon Flanigan | Sr |
| OL | 78 | Bill Holder | Fr |
| OT | 77 | Jason Holz | Sr |
| QB | 7 | Mark Humble | Jr |
| WR | 5 | Albert Johnson | So |
| RB | 46 | Jeff Pennington | Fr |
| RB | 28 | Rodnick Phillips | Fr |
| QB | 12 | Chris Sanders | Fr |
| WR | 83 | Kevin Thornal | Sr |
| WR | 11 | David Visinsky | Jr |

Defense

| Pos. | # | Name | Class |
|---|---|---|---|
| CB | 18 | Steve Bancroft | Jr |
| LB | 42 | Chris Bordano | Jr |
| DB | 25 | Chris Campbell | Jr |
| CB | 26 | Donald Mitchell | So |
| CB | 3 | Coby Rhinehart | So |
| LB | 97 | Jon Wilson | Jr |

Special teams

| Pos. | # | Name | Class |
|---|---|---|---|
| K | 10 | Daniel Hernandez | Jr |

Head coach

- Tom Rossley

Coordinators/assistant coaches

Legend

- (C) Team captain
- (S) Suspended
- (I) Ineligible
- Injured
- Redshirt

Roster
