= 1996 NCAA Division I-A football season =

American college football season

1996 NCAA Division I-A season
- Number of teams: 111
- Preseason AP No. 1: Nebraska

Postseason
- Bowl games: 18
- Heisman Trophy: Florida quarterback Danny Wuerffel

Bowl Alliance Championship
- 1997 Sugar Bowl
- Site: Louisiana Superdome, New Orleans, Louisiana
- Champion(s): Florida (AP, Coaches, FWAA)

Division I-A football seasons
- ← 1995 1997 →

The 1996 NCAA Division I-A football season ended with the Florida Gators being crowned National Champions after defeating rival Florida State in the Sugar Bowl, which was the season's designated Bowl Alliance national championship game. Florida had faced Florida State earlier in the year, when they were ranked No. 1 and No. 2, and lost 24–21. However, unranked Texas's upset of No. 3 Nebraska in the first ever Big 12 Championship Game set up the rematch of in-state rivals in New Orleans. In the Sugar Bowl, Florida's Heisman Trophy-winning senior quarterback Danny Wuerffel and head coach Steve Spurrier led the Gators to a 52–20 victory and their first national championship.

Because the Pac-10 and Big Ten Conferences were not yet part of the Bowl Alliance, their champions met in the Rose Bowl as they had for decades. In 1996, these conference champions were potential national title contenders in No. 2 Arizona State and No. 4 Ohio State. In a close Rose Bowl contest, Arizona State's Jake Plummer ran for a touchdown with 1:40 left to play to give his team the lead, but Ohio State responded with its own touchdown drive led by backup quarterback Joe Germaine and won 20–17. Ohio State finished No. 2 in the final AP poll behind No. 1 Florida, and Arizona State finished No. 4 behind Florida State. The poll results helped push the Pac-10 and Big Ten to give up their Rose Bowl tradition. Before the 1998 season, they both agreed to join an expanded Bowl Championship Series (BCS) agreement, giving their programs a chance to play in a national championship game. Another controversy that led to the creation of the BCS was that No. 5 BYU was not invited to a major bowl game but were snubbed in favor of lower ranked teams from Bowl Alliance conferences.

The 1996 season saw ongoing realignment of many conferences. One of the most notable developments was the creation of the Big 12 Conference, which consisted of programs from the old Big 8 along with four former members of the dissolved Southwest Conference, namely Texas, Texas A&M, Texas Tech, and Baylor. The Big 12 began play as a two division conference, with Oklahoma and Oklahoma State joining the South Division, breaking up the classic Nebraska–Oklahoma rivalry, but making the Texas–Oklahoma rivalry, known as the Red River Shootout into a conference game. The first Big 12 football game featured Texas Tech and Kansas State. Kansas State won by a score of 21–14.

The 1996 season was also notable as it marked the end of ties in college football, as an overtime system was put into place across all of Division I. Though it has been modified slightly, the "Kansas Playoff" overtime rules have been used ever since. (The 1995 season also had overtime rules, but only for postseason games. These rules were first used in the 1995 Las Vegas Bowl between Toledo and Nevada.)

== Rule changes ==
- The overtime system adopted in the 1995 season for bowl games was expanded for all Division I-A games.
- On punts and field goal attempts, the defense cannot touch the center/long snapper for one second after the snap. Violators are penalized 15 yards and an automatic first down.
- Officials were instructed to more strictly enforce intentional grounding rules.

== Conference realignment ==
Four teams upgraded from Division I-AA prior to the season and one university dropped its football program. As such, the total number of Division I-A schools increased to 111.

- The Big 12 Conference began play this season after a merger between the Big 8 Conference and four members of the former Southwest Conference (Texas, Texas A&M, Texas Tech, and Baylor). The new 12-member conference was divided into two, six-team divisions.
- Conference USA was formed prior to the season after a merger between two conferences that had previously not sponsored football, the Metro Conference and the Great Midwest Conference. Members of the new league included SWC member Houston (from the former Southwest Conference) and five long-time independents: Cincinnati, Louisville, Memphis, Southern Miss, and Tulane.
  - C-USA was given a tie-in with the Liberty Bowl for its league champion.
- The Western Athletic Conference, in turn, accepted TCU, SMU, and Rice from the SWC, UNLV and San Jose State from the Big West, and independent Tulsa. These moves pushed the WAC's membership to 16 and resulted in the creation of two divisions (Pacific and Mountain) and a league championship game.
- The Big West Conference also saw Arkansas State, Louisiana Tech, Northern Illinois, and Southwestern Louisiana (now Louisiana–Lafayette) depart to become independents. All four teams had joined the Big West in football only in 1993, remaining in more geographically-appropriate conferences for other sports.
- Pacific dropped their football team after the 1995 season. The Tigers had been a member of the Big West.
- Four teams upgraded from Division I-AA prior to the season: Alabama–Birmingham (UAB), Boise State, Central Florida, and Idaho.
  - Boise State, Idaho, and previously independent North Texas joined the Big West, while UAB and UCF became Division I-A independents.

=== Conference changes ===
School	1995 Conference	1996 Conference
Alabama–Birmingham Blazers	I-AA Independent	I-A Independent
Arkansas State Indians	Big West	I-A Independent
Baylor Bears	SWC	Big 12
Boise State Broncos	Big Sky (I-AA)	Big West (I-A)
Central Florida Knights	I-AA Independent	I-A Independent
Colorado Buffaloes	Big 8	Big 12
Cincinnati Bearcats	I-A Independent	Conference USA
Houston Cougars	SWC	Conference USA
Idaho Vandals	Big Sky (I-AA)	Big West (I-A)
Iowa State Cyclones	Big 8	Big 12
Kansas Jayhawks	Big 8	Big 12
Kansas State Wildcats	Big 8	Big 12
Louisiana Tech Bulldogs	Big West	I-A Independent
Louisville Cardinals	I-A Independent	Conference USA
Memphis Tigers	I-A Independent	Conference USA
Missouri Tigers	Big 8	Big 12
Nebraska Cornhuskers	Big 8	Big 12
North Texas Mean Green	I-A Independent	Big West
Northern Illinois Huskies	Big West	I-A Independent
Oklahoma Sooners	Big 8	Big 12
Oklahoma State Cowboys	Big 8	Big 12
Pacific Tigers	Big West	Dropped Program
Rice Owls	SWC	WAC
San Jose State Spartans	Big West	WAC
SMU Mustangs	SWC	WAC
Southern Miss Golden Eagles	I-A Independent	Conference USA
Southwestern Louisiana Ragin' Cajuns	Big West	I-A Independent
TCU Horned Frogs	SWC	WAC
Texas Longhorns	SWC	Big 12
Texas A&M Aggies	SWC	Big 12
Texas Tech Red Raiders	SWC	Big 12
Tulane Green Wave	I-A Independent	Conference USA
Tulsa Golden Hurricane	I-A Independent	WAC
UNLV Rebels	Big West	WAC

== Regular season ==
=== August–September ===
Two-time defending champion Nebraska was heavily favored to win a third straight national title, and the Cornhuskers were followed in the preseason AP Poll by No. 2 Tennessee, No. 3 Florida State, No. 4 Florida, and No. 5 Colorado.

August 31: No. 1 Nebraska and No. 3 Florida State had not begun their schedules. No. 2 Tennessee overwhelmed UNLV 62-3, No. 4 Florida defeated Southwestern Louisiana 55-21, and No. 5 Colorado beat Washington State 37-19. The top five remained the same in the next poll.

September 7: No. 1 Nebraska opened with a 55-14 win over Michigan State, No. 2 Tennessee beat UCLA 35-20, No. 3 Florida State defeated Duke 44-7, No. 4 Florida prevailed 62-14 over Georgia Southern, and No. 5 Colorado won 48-34 at Colorado State. The top five again remained the same.

September 14: The only top-five team active this weekend was No. 5 Colorado, who committed 14 penalties (one of which nullified a game-tying touchdown) in a 20-13 loss to No. 11 Michigan. No. 6 Penn State shut out Northern Illinois 49-0 and moved up in the next poll: No. 1 Nebraska, No. 2 Tennessee, No. 3 Florida State, No. 4 Florida, and No. 5 Penn State.

September 19–21: No. 1 Nebraska took a 26-game winning streak into their matchup with No. 17 Arizona State, a team they had defeated by 49 points the previous year. However, the Sun Devils completely neutralized the Cornhuskers’ offense in a 19-0 shutout win, Nebraska’s first loss since the 1993 national title game. In a matchup of SEC contenders, No. 4 Florida took a 35-0 second-quarter lead over No. 2 Tennessee and held off a Volunteers comeback for a 35-29 victory. No. 3 Florida State won 51-17 at North Carolina State, No. 5 Penn State shut out Temple 41-0, No. 7 Ohio State blanked Pittsburgh 72-0, and No. 9 Notre Dame beat No. 6 Texas 27-24 on a field goal as time expired. The next poll featured No. 1 Florida, No. 2 Florida State, No. 3 Penn State, No. 4 Ohio State, and No. 5 Notre Dame.

September 28: No. 1 Florida dominated Kentucky 65-0, and No. 2 Florida State shut out No. 11 North Carolina 13-0. No. 3 Penn State earned a 23-20 win at Wisconsin, but No. 4 Ohio State was more impressive in a 29-16 victory at No. 5 Notre Dame. No. 6 Arizona State beat Oregon 48-27 to move into the top five: No. 1 Florida, No. 2 Florida State, No. 3 Ohio State, No. 4 Penn State, and No. 5 Arizona State.

=== October ===
October 5: No. 1 Florida won 42-7 at Arkansas, and No. 2 Florida State defeated Clemson 34-3. In their second top-five matchup in two weeks, No. 3 Ohio State looked dominant in a 38-7 rout of No. 4 Penn State. No. 5 Arizona State beat Boise State 56-7, and No. 7 Nebraska overwhelmed No. 16 Kansas State 39-3 to move back into the top five: No. 1 Florida, No. 2 Ohio State, No. 3 Florida State, No. 4 Arizona State, and No. 5 Nebraska.

October 12: No. 1 Florida defeated No. 12 LSU 56-13. After two straight wins over highly-ranked opponents, No. 2 Ohio State needed a fourth-quarter comeback to escape unranked Wisconsin 17-14. No. 3 Florida State visited No. 6 Miami and beat their rivals 34-16. No. 4 Arizona State came back from a 21-point deficit to win 42-34 at UCLA. No. 5 Nebraska shut out Baylor 49-0, and the top five remained the same in the next poll.

October 19: No. 1 Florida dominated another ranked SEC opponent, winning 51-10 over No. 16 Auburn. No. 2 Ohio State won 42-14 at Purdue. No. 3 Florida State was idle. No. 4 Arizona State fell behind again and again in their game against USC but made three game-tying drives in regulation and another one in overtime. After taking their first lead of the game in double overtime, the Sun Devils put the game away with an 85-yard fumble return for a 48-35 final score. No. 5 Nebraska defeated Texas Tech 24-10, and the top five again remained the same.

October 26: No. 1 Florida was idle. No. 2 Ohio State visited No. 20 Iowa for a 38-26 win. No. 3 Florida State faced No. 14 Virginia, who had defeated them in a major upset the previous year, and the Seminoles got their revenge with a 31-24 victory. No. 4 Arizona State won 41-9 at Stanford, and No. 5 Nebraska beat Kansas 63-7. The top five again remained the same.

=== November–December ===
November 2: No. 1 Florida defeated Georgia 47-7, No. 2 Ohio State blanked Minnesota 45-0, No. 3 Florida State won 49-3 at Georgia Tech, No. 4 Arizona State visited Oregon State for a 29-14 victory, and No. 5 Nebraska blasted Oklahoma 73-21. The top five were the same yet again.

November 9: With all of the top-ranking teams on long winning streaks, several conference races were effectively over by early November. No. 1 Florida had an unexpectedly hard time with last-place Vanderbilt, but held on for a 28-21 win which clinched the SEC Eastern Division title for the Gators. No. 2 Ohio State posted their second straight shutout, 48-0 at Illinois. No. 3 Florida State wrapped up the ACC title with a 44-7 victory at Wake Forest, while No. 4 Arizona State earned the Pac-10 crown with a 35-7 defeat of California. No. 5 Nebraska beat Missouri 51-7, and the top five continued to stay the same.

November 16: No. 1 Florida defeated South Carolina 52-25, No. 2 Ohio State clinched the Big Ten title with a 27-17 win at Indiana, and No. 3 Florida State beat No. 25 Southern Mississippi 54-14. No. 4 Arizona State was idle, while No. 5 Nebraska won 49-14 at Iowa State. The top five remained unchanged for the fifth consecutive week.

November 23: No. 1 Florida and No. 3 Florida State were idle as they prepared for their upcoming game against each other. For the third time in four years, No. 2 Ohio State was undefeated going into their season-ending contest with archrival Michigan. In both 1993 and 1995, the Wolverines had spoiled the Buckeyes’ perfect record—and the result was the same in 1996, as No. 21 Michigan held OSU without a touchdown in a 13-9 come-from-behind victory which dropped Ohio State coach John Cooper’s career record against Michigan to 1-7-1. No. 4 Arizona State, soon to be the Buckeyes’ opponent in the Rose Bowl, did manage to complete a perfect regular season with a 56-14 win at Arizona. No. 5 Nebraska and No. 6 Colorado, who would play each other the following week, were both idle. The next poll featured No. 1 Florida, No. 2 Florida State, No. 3 Arizona State, No. 4 Nebraska, and No. 5 Colorado.

November 29–30: No. 1 Florida and No. 2 Florida State, both undefeated, met with a spot in the national title game seemingly on the line. The Seminoles jumped out to a 17-0 lead in the first quarter and held off a late Gators comeback to earn a 24-21 victory. No. 3 Arizona State, the only other undefeated team, had finished their schedule. No. 4 Nebraska and No. 5 Colorado, both with one loss, faced each other for the championship of the new Big 12 Northern Division, and the Cornhuskers prevailed 17-12 on a rain-soaked field. The next poll featured No. 1 Florida State, No. 2 Arizona State, No. 3 Nebraska, No. 4 Florida, and No. 5 Ohio State.

No. 1 Florida State and No. 2 Arizona State, the only two undefeated teams at the end of the regular season, could not play each other for the national title; as the winner of the Pac-10, Arizona State was contractually obligated to meet Big Ten champ Ohio State in the Rose Bowl. In previous years, No. 3 Nebraska would have been the next team in line to face Florida State. However, due to the recent merger between the Big 8 and SWC, the Cornhuskers needed to play one more game before heading into the bowls. In the first-ever Big 12 Championship Game on December 7, Nebraska faced off against Texas. The unranked Longhorns trailed in the fourth quarter, but scored two late touchdowns to pull off a 37-27 upset. Later that day, No. 4 Florida beat No. 11 Alabama, 45–30, in the SEC Championship Game to move back ahead of Nebraska in the final pre-bowl poll. No. 6 Brigham Young, with a 28-25 overtime defeat of No. 20 Wyoming in the WAC Championship Game, also moved up: No. 1 Florida State, No. 2 Arizona State, No. 3 Florida, No. 4 Ohio State, and No. 5 Brigham Young.

Therefore, just a month after their previous meeting, Florida State and Florida were set for a rematch in the Sugar Bowl. The Rose Bowl between Arizona State and Ohio State would also have national title implications, especially if the Seminoles lost and the Sun Devils won. The major games were rounded out by No. 5 Brigham Young and No. 14 Kansas State in the Cotton Bowl, No. 6 Nebraska and No. 10 Virginia Tech in the Orange, and No. 7 Penn State and No. 20 Texas in the Fiesta.

== Conference standings ==
1996 Atlantic Coast Conference football standings
	Conf.			Overall
Team	W		L	W		L
No. 3 Florida State $	8	–	0	11	–	1
No. 10 North Carolina	6	–	2	10	–	2
Clemson	6	–	2	7	–	5
Virginia	5	–	3	7	–	5
Georgia Tech	4	–	4	5	–	6
Maryland	3	–	5	5	–	6
NC State	3	–	5	3	–	8
Wake Forest	1	–	7	3	–	8
Duke	0	–	8	0	–	11
$ – Conference champion; Rankings from AP Poll

1996 Big 12 Conference football standings
	Conf.			Overall
Team	W		L	W		L
North Division
No. 6 Nebraska x%	8	–	0	11	–	2
No. 8 Colorado	7	–	1	10	–	2
No. 17 Kansas State	6	–	2	9	–	3
Missouri	3	–	5	5	–	6
Kansas	2	–	6	4	–	7
Iowa State	1	–	7	2	–	9
South Division
No. 23 Texas x$	6	–	2	8	–	5
Texas Tech	5	–	3	7	–	5
Texas A&M	4	–	4	6	–	6
Oklahoma	3	–	5	3	–	8
Oklahoma State	2	–	6	5	–	6
Baylor	1	–	7	4	–	7
Championship: Texas 37, Nebraska 27
x – Division champion/co-champions; $ – Bowl Alliance representative as champion % – Bowl Alliance at-large representative; Rankings from AP Poll

1996 Big East Conference football standings
	Conf.			Overall
Team	W		L	W		L
No. 13 Virginia Tech +	6	–	1	10	–	2
No. 14 Miami (FL) +	6	–	1	9	–	3
No. 21 Syracuse +	6	–	1	9	–	3
West Virginia	4	–	3	8	–	4
Pittsburgh	3	–	4	4	–	7
Boston College	2	–	5	5	–	7
Rutgers	1	–	6	2	–	9
Temple	0	–	7	1	–	10
+ – Conference co-champions; Rankings from AP Poll

1996 Big Ten Conference football standings
	Conf.			Overall
Team	W		L	W		L
No. 2 Ohio State +	7	–	1	11	–	1
No. 15 Northwestern +	7	–	1	9	–	3
No. 7 Penn State	6	–	2	11	–	2
No. 18 Iowa	6	–	2	9	–	3
No. 20 Michigan	5	–	3	8	–	4
Michigan State	5	–	3	6	–	6
Wisconsin	3	–	5	8	–	5
Purdue	2	–	6	3	–	8
Minnesota	1	–	7	4	–	7
Indiana	1	–	7	3	–	8
Illinois	1	–	7	2	–	9
+ – Conference co-champions; Rankings from AP Poll

1996 Big West Conference football standings
	Conf.			Overall
Team	W		L	W		L
Nevada +	4	–	1	9	–	3
Utah State +	4	–	1	6	–	5
Idaho	3	–	2	6	–	5
North Texas	3	–	2	5	–	6
Boise State	1	–	4	2	–	10
New Mexico State	0	–	5	1	–	10
+ – Conference co-champions

1996 Conference USA football standings
	Conf.			Overall
Team	W		L	W		L
Houston +	4	–	1	7	–	5
Southern Miss +	4	–	1	8	–	3
Cincinnati	2	–	3	6	–	5
Louisville	2	–	3	5	–	6
Memphis	2	–	3	4	–	7
Tulane	1	–	4	2	–	9
+ – Conference co-champions; Rankings from AP Poll

1996 Mid-American Conference football standings
	Conf.			Overall
Team	W		L	W		L
Ball State $	7	–	1	8	–	4
Toledo	6	–	2	7	–	4
Miami (OH)	6	–	2	6	–	5
Ohio	5	–	3	6	–	6
Central Michigan	4	–	4	5	–	6
Akron	3	–	5	4	–	7
Bowling Green	3	–	5	4	–	7
Eastern Michigan	3	–	5	3	–	8
Western Michigan	2	–	6	2	–	9
Kent State	1	–	7	2	–	9
$ – Conference champion

1996 Pacific-10 Conference football standings
	Conf.			Overall
Team	W		L	W		L
No. 4 Arizona State $	8	–	0	11	–	1
No. 16 Washington	7	–	1	9	–	3
Stanford	5	–	3	7	–	5
UCLA	4	–	4	5	–	6
Oregon	3	–	5	6	–	5
California	3	–	5	6	–	6
USC	3	–	5	6	–	6
Arizona	3	–	5	5	–	6
Washington State	3	–	5	5	–	6
Oregon State	1	–	7	2	–	9
$ – Conference champion; Rankings from AP Poll

1996 Southeastern Conference football standings
	Conf.			Overall
Team	W		L	W		L
Eastern Division
No. 1 Florida x$	8	–	0	12	–	1
No. 9 Tennessee	7	–	1	10	–	2
South Carolina	4	–	4	6	–	5
Kentucky	3	–	5	4	–	7
Georgia	3	–	5	5	–	6
Vanderbilt	0	–	8	2	–	9
Western Division
No. 11 Alabama xy	6	–	2	10	–	3
No. 12 LSU x	6	–	2	10	–	2
No. 24 Auburn	4	–	4	8	–	4
Mississippi State	3	–	5	5	–	6
Ole Miss	2	–	6	5	–	6
Arkansas	2	–	6	4	–	7
Championship: Florida 45, Alabama 30
$ – Conference champion; x – Division champion/co-champions; y – Championship game participant; Rankings from AP Poll

1996 Western Athletic Conference football standings
	Conf.			Overall
Team	W		L	W		L
Mountain Division
No. 5 BYU x$	8	–	0	14	–	1
Utah	6	–	2	8	–	4
Rice	6	–	2	7	–	4
SMU	4	–	4	5	–	6
New Mexico	3	–	5	6	–	5
TCU	3	–	5	4	–	7
Tulsa	2	–	6	4	–	7
UTEP	0	–	8	2	–	9
Pacific Division
No. 22 Wyoming x	7	–	1	10	–	2
San Diego State	6	–	2	8	–	3
Colorado State	6	–	2	7	–	5
Air Force	5	–	3	6	–	5
Fresno State	3	–	5	4	–	7
San Jose State	3	–	5	3	–	9
Hawaii	1	–	7	2	–	10
UNLV	1	–	7	1	–	11
Championship: BYU 28, Wyoming 25 ^{OT}
$ – Conference champion; x – Division champion/co-champions; Rankings from AP Poll

1996 NCAA Division I-A independents football records
	Conf.			Overall
Team	W		L	W		L
No. 25 Army		–		10	–	2
Navy		–		9	–	3
No. 19 Notre Dame		–		8	–	3
East Carolina		–		8	–	3
Louisiana Tech		–		6	–	5
UAB		–		5	–	6
UCF		–		5	–	6
Southwestern Louisiana		–		5	–	6
Northeast Louisiana		–		5	–	6
Arkansas State		–		4	–	7
Northern Illinois		–		1	–	10
Rankings from AP Poll

== I-AA team wins over I-A teams ==
Italics denotes I-AA teams.

Date	Visiting team	Home team	Site	Result	Attendance	Ref.
August 29	No. 25 (I-AA) Eastern Illinois	Western Michigan	Waldo Stadium • Kalamazoo, Michigan	28–20		
September 7	No. 2 (I-AA) Montana	Oregon State	Parker Stadium • Corvallis, Oregon	35–14	28,166	
September 7	Western Illinois	Northern Illinois	Huskie Stadium • DeKalb, Illinois	17–0	21,370	
September 14	Eastern Washington	Boise State	Bronco Stadium • Boise, Idaho	27–21	18,595	
September 21	Cal State Northridge	New Mexico State	Aggie Memorial Stadium • Las Cruces, New Mexico	33–0	12,259	
September 28	No. 22 (I-AA) Northwestern State	Boise State	Bronco Stadium • Boise, Idaho	20–16	18,893	
September 28	Idaho	Southwest Texas State	Bobcat Stadium • San Marcos, Texas	21–27	7,047	
^{#}Rankings from AP Poll released prior to game.

== Bowl Alliance first and seconds ==
The Bowl Alliance did not include the Pacific-10 and Big 10 conferences, whose champions played in the Rose Bowl. Thus, Arizona State and Ohio State (who met in the Rose Bowl) were excluded from the Bowl Alliance championship.

WEEKS	First	Conf.	Second	Conf.	Event	Date
PRE-4	Nebraska	Big 12	Tennessee	SEC	Arizona St. 19, Nebraska 0	September 21
5-6	Florida	SEC	Florida State	ACC	Ohio State 38, Penn State 7	October 5
7-14	Florida	SEC	No. 3 Florida State	ACC	Florida St. 24, Florida 21	November 30
15	Florida State	ACC	No. 3 Nebraska	Big 12	Texas 37, Nebraska 27	December 7
16	Florida State	ACC	No. 3 Florida	SEC	Florida 52, Florida State 20	January 1

== Bowl games ==
Sugar Bowl	No. 3 Florida	52	No. 1 Florida St.	20	1/2/97
Rose Bowl:	No. 4 Ohio State	20	No. 2 Arizona St.	17	1/1/97
Cotton Bowl Classic:	No. 5 Brigham Young	19	No. 14 Kansas St.	15	1/1/97
Fiesta Bowl:	No. 7 Penn State	38	No. 20 Texas	15	1/1/97
Florida Citrus Bowl:	No. 9 Tennessee	48	No. 11 Northwestern	28	1/1/97
Gator Bowl:	No. 12 North Carolina	20	No. 25 West Virginia	13	1/1/97
Outback Bowl:	No. 16 Alabama	17	No. 15 Michigan	14	1/1/97
Orange Bowl:	No. 6 Nebraska	41	No. 10 Virginia Tech	21	12/31/96
Sun Bowl:	Stanford	38	Michigan State	0	12/31/96
Independence Bowl	Auburn	32	No. 24 Army	29	12/31/96
Holiday Bowl:	No. 8 Colorado	33	No. 13 Washington	21	12/30/96
Alamo Bowl:	No. 21 Iowa	27	Texas Tech	0	12/29/96
Peach Bowl	No. 17 LSU	10	Clemson	7	12/28/96
Carquest Bowl	No. 19 Miami (FL)	31	Virginia	21	12/27/96
Liberty Bowl	No. 23 Syracuse	30	Houston	17	12/27/96
Copper Bowl:	Wisconsin	38	Utah	10	12/27/96
Aloha Bowl	Navy	42	California	38	12/25/96
Las Vegas Bowl	Nevada	18	Ball State	15	12/18/96

== Final AP Poll ==
1. Florida
2. Ohio St.
3. Florida St.
4. Arizona St.
5. BYU
6. Nebraska
7. Penn St.
8. Colorado
9. Tennessee
10. North Carolina
11. Alabama
12. LSU
13. Virginia Tech
14. Miami (FL)
15. Northwestern
16. Washington
17. Kansas St.
18. Iowa
19. Notre Dame
20. Michigan
21. Syracuse
22. Wyoming
23. Texas
24. Auburn
25. Army

Others receiving votes: 26. West Virginia; 27. East Carolina; 28. Southern Mississippi; 29. Stanford; 30. Wisconsin; 31. San Diego St.; 32. Virginia; 33. Clemson

== Final Coaches Poll ==
1. Florida
2. Ohio St.
3. Florida St.
4. Arizona St.
5. Brigham Young
6. Nebraska
7. Penn St.
8. Colorado
9. Tennessee
10. North Carolina
11. Alabama
12. Virginia Tech
13. LSU
14. Miami (FL)
15. Washington
16. Northwestern
17. Kansas St.
18. Iowa
19. Syracuse
20. Michigan
21. Notre Dame
22. Wyoming
23. Texas
24. Army
25. Auburn

== Heisman Trophy voting ==
The Heisman Trophy is given to the year's most outstanding player

Player	School	Position	1st	2nd	3rd	Total
Danny Wuerffel	Florida	QB	300	158	147	1,363
Troy Davis	Iowa State	RB	209	206	135	1,174
Jake Plummer	Arizona State	QB	116	113	111	685
Orlando Pace	Ohio State	OT	87	101	136	599
Warrick Dunn	Florida State	RB	40	76	69	341
Byron Hanspard	Texas Tech	RB	15	68	70	251
Darnell Autry	Northwestern	RB	9	10	20	85
Peyton Manning	Tennessee	QB	4	23	23	81
Marcus Harris	Wyoming	WR	7	7	18	53
Beau Morgan	Air Force	QB	3	3	11	26

== Other major awards ==
- Maxwell Award (College Player of the Year) - Danny Wuerffel, Florida
- Walter Camp Award (Player of the Year) - Danny Wuerffel, Florida
- Davey O'Brien Award (Quarterback) - Danny Wuerffel, Florida
- Johnny Unitas Golden Arm Award (Senior Quarterback) - Danny Wuerffel, Florida
- Doak Walker Award (Running Back) - Byron Hanspard, Texas Tech
- Fred Biletnikoff Award (Wide Receiver) - Marcus Harris, Wyoming
- Bronko Nagurski Trophy (Defensive Player) - Pat Fitzgerald, Northwestern
- Dick Butkus Award (Linebacker) - Matt Russell, Colorado
- Lombardi Award (Lineman or Linebacker) - Orlando Pace, Ohio State
- Outland Trophy (Interior Lineman) - Orlando Pace, OT, Ohio State
- Jim Thorpe Award (Defensive Back) - Lawrence Wright, Florida
- Lou Groza Award (Placekicker) - Tony DeGiovanni, University of Miami
- Paul "Bear" Bryant Award - Bruce Snyder, Arizona St.

== Attendances ==
Average home attendance top 3:

Rank	Team	Average
1	Michigan Wolverines	105,932
2	Tennessee Volunteers	105,418
3	Penn State Nittany Lions	96,167
