= 1996 BYU Cougars football team =

American college football season

1996 BYU Cougars football

WAC champion WAC Mountain Division champion Cotton Bowl Classic champion

WAC Championship Game, W 28–25 ^{OT} vs. Wyoming

Cotton Bowl Classic, W 19–15 vs. Kansas State
- Conference: Western Athletic Conference
- Mountain Division

Ranking
- Coaches: No. 5
- AP: No. 5
- Record: 14–1 (8–0 WAC)
- Head coach: LaVell Edwards (25th season)
- Co-offensive coordinators: Norm Chow (1st season); Roger French (16th season)
- Offensive scheme: Pro spread
- Defensive coordinator: Ken Schmidt (6th season)
- Base defense: 4–3
- Home stadium: Cougar Stadium

1996 Western Athletic Conference football standings
	Conf.			Overall
Team	W		L	W		L
Mountain Division
No. 5 BYU x$	8	–	0	14	–	1
Utah	6	–	2	8	–	4
Rice	6	–	2	7	–	4
SMU	4	–	4	5	–	6
New Mexico	3	–	5	6	–	5
TCU	3	–	5	4	–	7
Tulsa	2	–	6	4	–	7
UTEP	0	–	8	2	–	9
Pacific Division
No. 22 Wyoming x	7	–	1	10	–	2
San Diego State	6	–	2	8	–	3
Colorado State	6	–	2	7	–	5
Air Force	5	–	3	6	–	5
Fresno State	3	–	5	4	–	7
San Jose State	3	–	5	3	–	9
Hawaii	1	–	7	2	–	10
UNLV	1	–	7	1	–	11
Championship: BYU 28, Wyoming 25 ^{OT}
$ – Conference champion; x – Division champion/co-champions; Rankings from AP Poll

The 1996 Brigham Young Cougars football team represented the Brigham Young University in the 1996 NCAA Division I-A football season. They were the first team during the so-called "Modern era" (post 1937) to play 15 games in a season, and the only one to do it when Division I-A teams normally played 11 regular season games. Firstly, a team was able to play a designated "kickoff" opening game and not have it count against the allowed game total, then they played at Hawaii which did not count against the allowed total. That allowed BYU to play 13 regular season games. They then played a conference championship game and a bowl game in the Cotton Bowl Classic bringing the total to 15 games.

During the 2002 and 2003 seasons teams were allowed to schedule 12 games as well as a "kickoff" game. As a result, the 2003 Kansas State Wildcats became only the second team to play a 15-game season, finishing with an 11-4 record. The kickoff game exemption was eliminated in 2005, but the Hawaii exemption remains in place.

Since 2014, it has again been possible for teams to play a 15-game schedule without playing in Hawaii because of the 4 team playoff system. The next team to do this without the aid of the playoff would be the 2019 Hawaii Rainbow Warriors.

== Schedule ==
Date	Time	Opponent	Rank	Site	TV	Result	Attendance
August 24	10:00 am	No. 13 Texas A&M*		Cougar Stadium; Provo, UT (Pigskin Classic)	ABC	W 41–37	55,229
August 31	7:00 pm	Arkansas State*	No. 19	Cougar Stadium; Provo, UT	KSL	W 58–9	63,681
September 14	1:30 pm	at Washington*	No. 14	Husky Stadium; Seattle, WA	ABC	L 17–29	71,165
September 21	12:00 pm	New Mexico		Cougar Stadium; Provo, UT	KSL	W 17–14	63,587
September 28	12:00 pm	SMU	No. 24	Cougar Stadium; Provo, UT	KSL	W 31–3	62,537
October 4	7:00 pm	at Utah State*	No. 21	Romney Stadium; Logan, UT (The Old Wagon Wheel)	KUTV	W 45–17	33,119
October 12	12:00 pm	UNLV*	No. 19	Cougar Stadium; Provo, UT	KSL	W 63–28	64,872
October 19	7:00 pm	at Tulsa	No. 18	Skelly Stadium; Tulsa, OK	ESPN2	W 55–30	34,624
October 26	1:00 pm	at TCU	No. 15	Amon G. Carter Stadium; Fort Worth, TX	KSL	W 45–21	28,961
November 2	12:00 pm	UTEP	No. 13	Cougar Stadium; Provo, UT	KSL	W 40–18	64,938
November 9	12:00 pm	Rice	No. 12	Cougar Stadium; Provo, UT	KSL	W 49–0	65,732
November 16	10:00 pm	at Hawaii	No. 10	Aloha Stadium; Halawa, HI	KSL	W 45–14	16,468
November 23	10:30 am	at Utah	No. 8	Robert Rice Stadium; Salt Lake City, UT (Holy War)	ESPN	W 37–17	35,378
December 7	2:30 pm	vs. No. 20 Wyoming	No. 6	Sam Boyd Stadium; Whitney, NV (WAC Championship Game)	ABC	W 28–25 ^{OT}	41,328
January 1	12:30 pm	vs. No. 14 Kansas State*	No. 5	Cotton Bowl; Dallas, TX (Cotton Bowl Classic)	CBS	W 19–15	71,928
*Non-conference game; Rankings from AP Poll released prior to the game; All times are in Mountain time

== Rankings ==
Ranking movements Legend: ██ Increase in ranking ██ Decrease in ranking — = Not ranked
	Week																	
Poll	Pre	1	2	3	4	5	6	7	8	9	10	11	12	13	14	15	16	Final
AP	—	19	16	14	—	24	21	19	18	15	13	12	10	8	7	6	5	5
Coaches	—		16	15	25	24	21	20	20	16	14	12	10	7	7	6	5	5

== Roster ==
1996 BYU Cougars football team roster
Players
Coaches
Offense

Pos.	#	Name	Class
OL	79	Jason Andersen	Jr
WR	85	R. J. Anderson	Jr
FB	35	Donny Atuaia	Fr
RB	22	Mark Atuaia	Sr
OL	73	Eric Bateman	So
QB	12	Steve Sarkisian	Sr
OL	78	Greg Hoagland	Sr
WR	14	Margin Hooks	Fr
WR	88	Ben Horton	Fr
OT	68	Scott Fannin	Sr
TE	96	Chad Lewis	Sr
WR	80	Kaipo McGuire	Sr
TE	88	Itula Mili	Sr
OL	75	John Tait	Fr

Defense

Pos.	#	Name	Class
DL	90	Harland Ah You	Jr
LB	39	Joe Ambrosius	Jr
DB	9	Jason Anderson	Jr
LB	44	Rob Morris	Fr
LB	46	Shay Muirbrook (C)	Jr

Special teams

Pos.	#	Name	Class

Head coach

- LaVell Edwards

Coordinators/assistant coaches

- Robbie Bosco (quarterbacks)
- Norm Chow (associate head coach / offensive coordinator / quarterbacks / receivers)
- Roger French (offensive live / offensive coordinator)
- Barry Lamb (safeties)
- Brian Mitchell (cornerbacks)
- Chris Pella (recruiting coordinator / kickers / tight ends)
- Tom Ramage (defensive line / special teams)
- Lance Reynolds (running backs)
- Ken Schmidt (defensive coordinator / linebackers)
- Mike Empey (graduate assistant)
- Nathan Gibbs (graduate assistant)

Legend

- (C) Team captain
- (S) Suspended
- (I) Ineligible
- Injured
- Redshirt

Roster
