= 1997 Cotton Bowl Classic =

1997 Southwestern Bell Cotton Bowl Classic
- 61st Cotton Bowl Classic
- Southwestern Bell Cotton Bowl Classic logo
Kansas State Wildcats	BYU Cougars
(9–2)	(13–1)
Big 12	WAC
15	19
Head coach: Bill Snyder	Head coach: LaVell Edwards
AP / Coaches / BA; 14 / 14 / 14	AP / Coaches / BA; 5 / 5 / 5
	1	2	3	4	Total
Kansas State	0	8	7	0	15
BYU	5	0	0	14	19
- Date: January 1, 1997
- Season: 1996
- Stadium: Cotton Bowl
- Location: Dallas, Texas
- MVP: WR Kevin Lockett (Kansas State); QB Steve Sarkisian (BYU); LB Shay Muirbrook (BYU)
- Referee: Courtney Mauzy (ACC)
- Attendance: 71,928

United States TV coverage
- Network: CBS
- Announcers: Tim Ryan, Phil McConkey and Steve Davis

The Cotton Bowl in Dallas, Texas, hosted the Cotton Bowl Classic.

The 1997 Southwestern Bell Cotton Bowl Classic was a college football bowl game played on January 1, 1997, at the Cotton Bowl in Dallas, Texas, USA. The Cotton Bowl Classic was part of the 1996 NCAA Division I-A football season. The bowl game featured the Kansas State Wildcats from the Big 12 and the BYU Cougars from the Western Athletic Conference. The game was televised on CBS.

== Game summary ==
BYU's defense had kept the Cougars in range, limiting Kansas State to 199 yards of offense through three quarters, with 113 of them coming on two plays, a Hail Mary, tipped touchdown pass to Andre Anderson at the end of the first half and a 72-yard catch and run by Kevin Lockett early in the third quarter for another touchdown.

BYU was trailing, 15–5, in the fourth quarter when Kansas State's All-America cornerback, Chris Canty, was helped off the field because of cramps caused by dehydration. When Joe Gordon moved to the short side of the field to take Canty's place, reserve cornerback Demetric Denmark entered on the wide side.

BYU immediately attacked the less experienced player when James Dye caught a 32-yard touchdown catch over Denmark in the end zone to cut K-State's lead to 15–12.

Canty was still off the field two possessions later when BYU began what would prove to be the winning 60-yard drive. When Gordon also came off the field on a third-and-seven at the K-State 28, freshman cornerback Lamar Chapman was thrown into the game for the first time.

Again, BYU picked up on the substitution and Steve Sarkisian hit K.O. Kealaluhi, who had a step on Chapman, in the left corner of the end zone for the go-ahead touchdown. With the extra-point kick, BYU had a 19–15 lead with three minutes, 39 seconds left.

An important part of the touchdown, according to Bill Snyder, was that his defense was on the field for 17:30 of the second half, five minutes longer than BYU's defense.

After BYU took the lead, Kansas State still had one last chance to win and drove from its own 28 to the BYU 17 with 1:34 remaining in the game.

But that's when BYU's cornerbacks stepped up.

K-State quarterback Brian Kavanagh threw to Lockett in back of the end zone, but McTyer hit Lockett in the air and drove him out of bounds before he could get his feet down.

Two plays later, Kavanagh tried a pass to Jimmy Dean on a slant pattern. But BYU's Morgan broke on the ball and tipped it to himself for the game-saving interception.
