= Steve Sarkisian =

American football player and coach (born 1974)

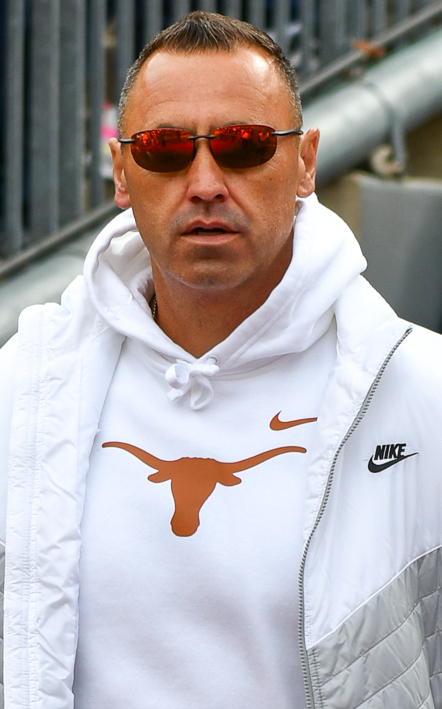
- Sarkisian in 2024

Texas Longhorns
- Title: Head coach

Personal information
- Born: March 8, 1974 (age 52); Torrance, California, U.S.

Career information
- Position: Quarterback (No. 12)
- High school: West (Torrance)
- College: El Camino (1993–1994); BYU (1995–1996)
- CFL draft: 1997: undrafted

Career history

Playing
- Saskatchewan Roughriders (1997–1999)

Coaching
- El Camino (2000) Quarterbacks coach; USC (2001–2003) Quarterbacks coach; Oakland Raiders (2004) Quarterbacks coach; USC (2005–2008); Quarterbacks coach (2005–2006); Assistant head coach, offensive coordinator & quarterbacks coach (2007–2008); Washington (2009–2013) Head coach; USC (2014–2015) Head coach; Alabama (2016) Offensive assistant/Interim offensive coordinator; Atlanta Falcons (2017–2018) Offensive coordinator; Alabama (2019–2020) Offensive coordinator / quarterbacks coach; Texas (2021–present) Head coach

Awards and highlights
- Playing: Sammy Baugh Trophy (1996); NCAA passer rating leader (1996); NCAA completion percentage leader (1996); WAC Offensive Player of the Year (1996); Coaching As a head coach: Big 12 champion (2023); AP Big 12 Coach of the Year (2023); As an assistant coach: 2× National champion (2003, 2020); 3× Pac-10 champion (2002), (2007–2008); 2× SEC champion (2016, 2020); Broyles Award (2020); PFF Offensive Coordinator of the Year (2020)

Head coaching record
- Regular season: 99–52 (.656)
- Postseason: 4–5 (.444)
- Career: 103–57 (.644)

Stephen Ambrose Sarkisian (/sɑːrˈkiːʒən/; born March 8, 1974) is an Armenian-American football coach and former player who is the head football coach at the University of Texas. He previously was the head football coach at the University of Washington from 2009 to 2013 and the University of Southern California (USC) from 2014 to 2015.

Sarkisian played college football as a quarterback at Brigham Young University (BYU) and professionally with the Saskatchewan Roughriders of the Canadian Football League (CFL). Sarkisian was the offensive coordinator for the Atlanta Falcons of the National Football League (NFL) from 2017 to 2018 and at the University of Alabama from 2019 to 2020.

== Playing career ==
=== USC and El Camino College baseball ===
After a standout baseball and football career at West High School in Torrance, California, Sarkisian's size (6'0" and 165 lb) did not attract any college football offers. He began his collegiate athletic career in 1992 at the University of Southern California (USC) as a non-scholarship middle infielder on the Trojans baseball team. He struggled playing NCAA Division I baseball and transferred after a semester to El Camino College, a two-year community college adjacent to his hometown of Torrance, where he played shortstop.

=== El Camino College football ===
At the urging of El Camino head football coach John Featherstone, one of his instructors, Sarkisian restarted his football career. As a redshirt freshman in 1993, Sarkisian earned All-Mission Conference honors. In his sophomore season, he was named a junior college All-American after setting national junior college records in passer efficiency rating of 203.8 and completion percentage (72.4%).

=== BYU football ===
==== 1995 ====
As a junior, Sarkisian transferred to Brigham Young University in Provo, Utah, for the 1995 season. He was recruited by DeWayne Walker, then an assistant coach for the BYU Cougars. Although Kansas State and Washington State showed interest, Sarkisian chose BYU primarily because the school boasted more combined Davey O'Brien- and Heisman-winning quarterbacks in the last decade than any other had in the previous 50 years of Division I-A. The previous BYU starting quarterback, John Walsh, was also from Torrance and a friend of Sarkisian. Walsh left school a year early to enter the 1995 NFL draft, creating a void in the depth chart; Sarkisian accepted a scholarship with BYU in December 1994.

At BYU, Sarkisian was coached by offensive coordinator Norm Chow under head coach LaVell Edwards. As a junior, Sarkisian passed for 3,437 yards and 20 touchdowns, earning All-Western Athletic Conference honors. Sarkisian finished the season by completing 31 of 34 passes for 399 yards and three touchdowns in BYU's 45–28 victory over Fresno State. His completion percentage in the game (91.2 percent) set an NCAA record at that time.

==== 1996 ====
As a senior, Sarkisian opened BYU's 1996 season by passing for 536 yards and six touchdowns in the Cougars' 41–37 upset victory over Texas A&M in the Pigskin Classic. The 536 yards passing were the most ever by a player against Texas A&M. Sarkisian finished the game with a 46-yard touchdown pass to K. O. Kealaluhi to seal the victory.

BYU finished the regular season with a 13–1 record, defeating Wyoming, 28–25, in the WAC Championship Game. Sarkisian passed for 4,027 yards and 33 touchdowns during the regular season. His 68.8% completion percentage and 173.6 passer rating led the NCAA. For his efforts, he was named WAC Offensive Player of the Year and second-team All-American by The Football News. Sarkisian was also awarded the Sammy Baugh Trophy as the nation's top passer, making him the seventh BYU quarterback to win the honor. He was also featured on the cover of TV Guide in December 1996.

BYU finished the season with 19–15 win over Kansas State in the Cotton Bowl Classic. Sarkisian threw a pair of touchdown passes in the fourth quarter to lead the Cougars to a come-from-behind victory. BYU finished the season with a 14–1 record and ranked fifth in the nation in both the AP Poll and Coaches' Poll. The Cougars became the first Division I-A team in NCAA history to win 14 games in a single season. Sarkisian's 162.0 career passing efficiency rating is 18th on the all-time NCAA list.

Sarkisian earned a bachelors degree in sociology from BYU in 1997 after receiving an associate degree in general studies from El Camino in 1994.

=== Canadian Football League ===
Sarkisian played professionally for three seasons, 1997 to 1999, for the Saskatchewan Roughriders in the Canadian Football League (CFL). He was a starter in the 1999 season, finishing with 16 touchdown passes and 21 interceptions. His team finished with a dismal 3–15 record, prompting Sarkisian to end his playing career.

Season	Passing								Rushing			
Season	Comp	Att	Pct	Yds	Avg	TD	Int	Rate	Att	Yds	Avg	TD
1998	52	92	56.5	604	6.6	4	4	72.9	6	32	5.3	0
1999	175	290	60.3	2,290	7.9	16	21	73.5	39	169	4.3	1
Career	227	382	59.4	2,894	7.6	20	25	73.4	45	201	4.5	1

== Coaching career ==
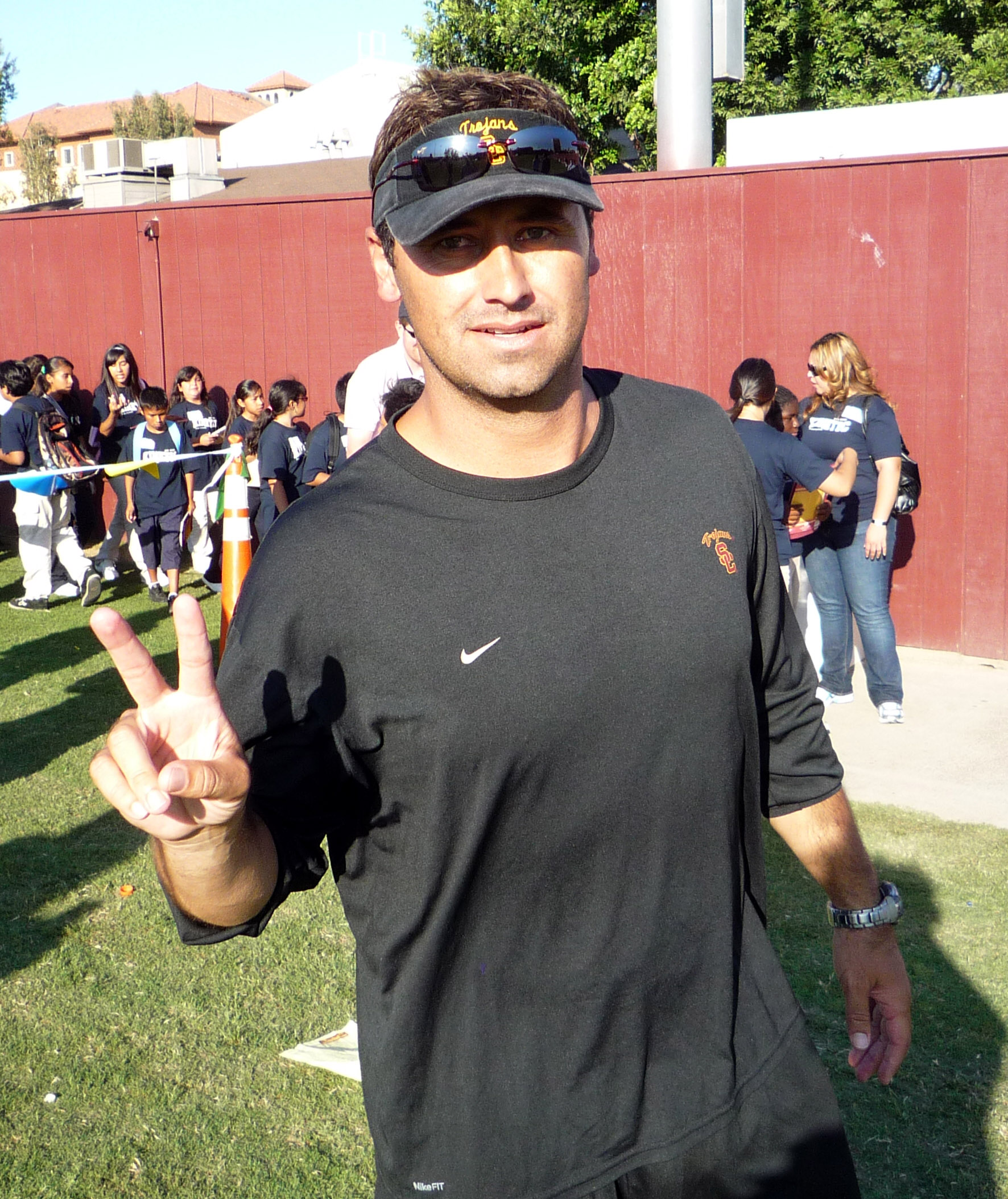
Sarkisian making USC's traditional "V-for-victory" sign after a 2008 fall practice

=== El Camino College ===
Sarkisian's coaching career began in 2000 when he returned to El Camino College as its quarterbacks coach.

=== USC and Oakland Raiders ===
The following season, Sarkisian joined his former coach, Norm Chow, at USC. Chow was hired as USC's offensive coordinator by new head coach Pete Carroll. Sarkisian worked as an offensive assistant in 2001 and then as quarterbacks coach in 2002 and 2003. In 2004, Sarkisian moved to the professional ranks as quarterbacks coach for the Oakland Raiders of the NFL. Oakland compiled more than 4,000 passing yards, ranking eighth out of 32 NFL teams in passing yardage. Sarkisian returned to USC for the 2005 season with the title of assistant head coach added to his duties as quarterbacks coach. In January 2007, Sarkisian interviewed with the Raiders for their vacant head coaching position, but pulled himself out of the running to stay at USC. Sarkisian was named to replace Lane Kiffin as USC's offensive coordinator when Kiffin took the head coaching job with the Raiders.

=== Washington ===
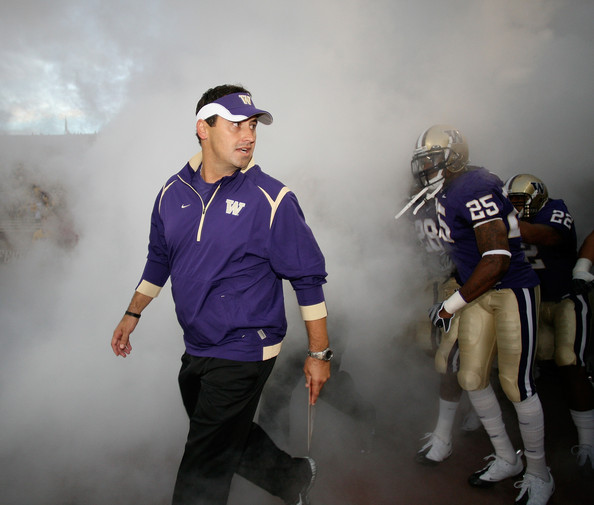
Sarkisian leading the Huskies onto the field

Following the completion of a winless 2008 season, the University of Washington introduced Sarkisian as its 23rd head football coach during a press conference in the Don James Center at Husky Stadium on December 8, 2008. Sarkisian signed a contract that paid him $1.75 million in 2009, with a salary increasing to $2.3 million by 2013. Down in Los Angeles, John Morton succeeded Sarkisian as offensive coordinator at USC.

In Sarkisian's first year as head coach in 2009, Washington scored a huge upset of Sarkisian's former team, defeating #3 USC 16–13 with a last second field goal. Washington then lost six of their next seven games, but finished the season in strong fashion, dominating rival Washington State, 30–0, to claim the Apple Cup, and scoring another upset with a rout of #19 California, 42–10. Washington finished the year with a 5–7 record, a dramatic improvement over the previous season, a winless 0–12.

With Pete Carroll's departure from USC to coach the Seattle Seahawks on January 9, 2010, Sarkisian was discussed in the media as a potential replacement, but Sarkisian stated that he had not received an offer to become head coach of the Trojans. Despite his public comments, Sarkisian was still considered a top candidate for the position by USC athletic director Mike Garrett. However, Sarkisian expressed reservations about leaving Washington after one year, and decided not to pursue the position. Ultimately, Lane Kiffin was hired for the position.

In Sarkisian's second season as head coach of Washington, the Huskies went 6–6 in 2010. The Huskies defeated USC again with a game-ending field goal, this time in Los Angeles. At mid-season, UW had alternated losses and wins and was 3–3, then were outscored 138–30 in the next three games, all losses against Arizona, Stanford, and Oregon. They fell to 3–6, but finished the year on a high note with three consecutive wins and were bowl eligible for the first time since the 2002 season. The Huskies concluded the season with a stunning 19–7 victory over #18 Nebraska in the Holiday Bowl, avenging a 56–21 blowout home loss to the Huskers in September. It was their first winning season in nine years.

With star quarterback Jake Locker departing to the NFL, many expected the Huskies to regress in the 2011 season, Sarkisian's third. The Huskies started out a surprising 6–2 and were undefeated in conference play at the halfway point of the season; at one point, they were ranked in all major polls for the first time during his short tenure. However, they then went 1–3 in their remaining conference games, with blowout defeats to Oregon, USC, and Oregon State. The Huskies subsequently lost in the Alamo Bowl to Baylor, 67–56, to finish 7–6 on the season.

In 2012, Washington finished 7–6 again following a 28–26 loss to Boise State in the Maaco Bowl Las Vegas. As his previous campaigns had gone, Sarkisian's 2012 Washington team defeated most of the lower-level Pac-12 teams but were blown out by the upper-level ones. Sarkisian's consecutive seven-win seasons earned him the mocking nickname "Seven Win Steve". Sarkisian would go on to win eight games in 2013 before taking the head coaching job at USC prior to Washington's bowl game.

==== New contract ====
Sarkisian's original contract in 2009 was for five years and paid $1.75 million in guaranteed money for the first year, rising to $2.0 million in 2011 and $2.3 million in 2013. Following the 2010 season and bowl victory, he signed a new five-year contract that paid $2.25 million in guaranteed money in 2011, rising to $2.85 million in 2015.

=== Return to USC ===
On December 2, 2013, Sarkisian chose to return to USC, accepting the head coaching position. Sarkisian's goal was to get USC back to its winning ways with NCAA sanctions finally ending. Like Lane Kiffin, Sarkisian called all plays on offense and served as the de facto offensive coordinator.

Sarkisian dealt with some controversy before his first game as head coach, when defensive captain Josh Shaw told the team he suffered two high ankle sprains when he jumped from a balcony to save his drowning nephew. After numerous calls questioning the authenticity of the story, Shaw admitted he lied to the athletic department. Sarkisian suspended Shaw indefinitely.

On September 8, 2014, Sarkisian and USC athletic director Pat Haden were reprimanded by Pac-12 Conference commissioner Larry Scott for attempting "to influence the officiating, and ultimately the outcome of a contest" during the September 6 game with Stanford. Haden was fined $25,000.

==== 2015 leave of absence and termination ====
On October 11, 2015, Haden announced Sarkisian would take an indefinite leave of absence. Haden contacted Sarkisian after he learned that Sarkisian had not shown up to a scheduled practice on October 11. During his conversation with Sarkisian, Haden said he became aware that Sarkisian was "not healthy" and asked Sarkisian to take an indefinite leave of absence. Offensive coordinator Clay Helton would serve as interim head coach in Sarkisian's absence. ESPN later reported that Sarkisian came to a pre-practice meeting, only to have his assistants tell him to go home when he appeared to be intoxicated. Scott Wolf, the USC beat writer for the Los Angeles Daily News, reported on Twitter that several players smelled alcohol on Sarkisian's breath.

On October 12, Haden announced that Sarkisian had been fired and named Helton as interim head coach for the remainder of the season (the "interim" tag was removed after the season). He subsequently revealed that he had tried to call Sarkisian to notify him personally, but by then Sarkisian was on his way to an out-of-state rehab facility and could not be reached.

According to ESPN, Haden had placed Sarkisian on a zero-tolerance policy regarding alcohol use after Sarkisian claimed to have mixed alcohol with medication, despite the fact that he appeared simply to have drunk far too heavily before giving a drunken and profanity-laced speech at a booster club event (Sarkisian apologized after the incident before the 2015 season began). The apparent intoxication at practice would have been grounds for termination. However, multiple reports said that Sarkisian's assistants believed he was drunk during a game against Arizona State.

Hours before Sarkisian's firing, the Los Angeles Times reported that Sarkisian had been involved in numerous alcohol-related incidents while at the University of Washington. Haden admitted that he had not done a public-records check on Sarkisian prior to hiring him.

Sarkisian filed a $30 million wrongful termination lawsuit against USC, but later agreed to move it to private arbitration. He eventually lost the suit and did not appeal, stating that he would respect the result and move on.

=== Alabama ===
In September 2016, Alabama hired Sarkisian as an analyst for their football team.

Following Lane Kiffin's departure to become the head coach at Florida Atlantic, Sarkisian was promoted to the Alabama offensive coordinator position on January 2, 2017. He stepped into the role in the national championship game against Clemson. The Tide would lose narrowly to the Tigers in his first and only game of the 2016 season as offensive coordinator.

=== Atlanta Falcons ===
On February 7, 2017, Sarkisian was hired as offensive coordinator for the Atlanta Falcons, taking over for the recently departed Kyle Shanahan who left to become the head coach of the 49ers. The offense's scoring output, under his guidance, dropped from 33.8 points per game (leading the NFL in 2016) to 22.1 points per game in 2017. In 2018, the offense's scoring improved to 25.9 points per game. On December 31, 2018, he was fired as offensive coordinator.

=== Alabama (second stint) ===
In January 2019, Alabama re-hired Sarkisian as the offensive coordinator. In 2020, Sarkisian served as interim head coach for Alabama's 42–13 victory over Auburn after Nick Saban had to be quarantined due to COVID-19 protocols.

During his second stint at Alabama, Sarkisian coached quarterbacks Mac Jones and Tua Tagovailoa. He won the Broyles Award, given to the nation's top coaching assistant, for his coaching during the 2020 season. He also won the FootballScoop Offensive Coordinator of the Year award, voted on by previous winners of the award.

=== Texas ===
On January 2, 2021, Sarkisian was named the 31st head football coach at the University of Texas at Austin. His initial contract at Texas was for six years and $34.2 million.

==== 2021 season ====
At the beginning of Sarkisian's first season as the head football coach at Texas, the Longhorns were ranked No. 21 in the AP Poll. Sarkisian began the year by leading the Longhorns to a 38–18 victory over the No. 23 ranked Louisiana Ragin' Cajuns. In Week 2 of the 2021 season, the Longhorns were defeated 40–21 by the Arkansas Razorbacks, in the first matchup in the Arkansas–Texas football rivalry since the 2014 Texas Bowl. In the following weeks, Sarkisian led the Longhorns to a 58–0 victory over Rice, a 70–35 victory over Texas Tech, and a 32–27 victory over TCU. The Longhorns then proceeded to lose six consecutive games, which the program had not seen since the 1956 season. Though Sarkisian and the Longhorns finished the season with a disappointing 5–7 record, some bright spots included the second best offense in the Big 12 with 35.3 points per game and wide receiver Xavier Worthy receiving True Freshman All-American honors as well as being elected Big 12 Offensive Freshman of the Year and earning a spot on the 2021 All-Big 12 First Team.

==== 2022 season ====
The Longhorns were unranked in the AP Poll to start Sarkisian's second year. After dominating the UL-Monroe Warhawks 52–10, Texas lost a close game to #1 Alabama in a game that saw star QB Quinn Ewers leave with injury as well as some questionable referee calls. After winning vs UTSA 41–20 in front of a record crowd at home, Sarkisian suffered an upset loss in OT to Texas Tech 34–31. After this loss, the Longhorns under Sarkisian would win six of their next eight games to finish the regular season 8–4, with the team's only losses coming to #11 Oklahoma State and #6 TCU by one score each. The highlight of the Longhorns' season would be a 49-0 domination of Oklahoma in the Red River Rivalry.

After losing in the Alamo Bowl to Washington 27–20, Sarkisian's Texas Longhorns finished the 2022 season 8-5 and ranked #25 in the AP Poll, a drastic improvement over the year prior.

==== 2023 season ====
Heading into the 2023 season (Texas's final year in the Big 12 before they headed to the Southeastern Conference), the Longhorns were ranked at #11 in the AP preseason poll. However, after a stunning victory over #3 Alabama in Week 2, they shot up to #4 in the polls. Succeeding thanks to an offense led by QB Quinn Ewers and a thriving defense, the Longhorns would go 5–0 before losing a nail-biter to Oklahoma in the Red River Rivalry 34–30. After that loss, Sarkisian's Longhorns would win the rest of their regular season games and then proceed to win the Big 12 Championship against Oklahoma State 49–21 in convincing fashion. Making the College Football Playoff as the #3 seed, Sarkisian led the Longhorns in a rematch against the Washington Huskies in the Sugar Bowl, losing in an incredibly close 37–31 game that came down to a deflected pass to the end zone by Quinn Ewers. The Longhorns finished the season ranked #3 in the AP Poll.

==== 2024 season ====
On February 22, 2024, Steve Sarkisian was given a four-year contract extension through 2030 that also increased his salary for the 2024 season to $10.3 million. He found success in the regular season, having an 11–1 record, and leading the Longhorns to the Southeastern Conference championship game, losing to Georgia. Sarkisian would guide Texas back to the now-expanded College Football Playoff, losing in the national semifinal to Ohio State, the eventual national champion.

==== 2025 season ====
Texas came into the season ranked atop the preseason polls. The Longhorns lost their season opener on the road, a highly anticipated game against the defending national champion, Ohio State. Viewership for the game reached 16.1 million, making it the most-watched Week 1 game in college football history. Subsequent losses to Florida and Georgia kept Texas out of the 2025–26 College Football Playoff.

== Personal life ==
Born in Torrance, California, Sarkisian is the youngest of seven children; he is of Armenian and Irish ancestry. Sarkisian is Catholic. His father, Seb Sarkisian, was born in Tehran and immigrated to the United States at the age of 18, while his mother Sally was raised in Boston.

In April 2015, it was reported that Sarkisian and his first wife, Stephanie, filed for divorce. Sarkisian and his ex-wife have three children, two daughters and a son. Sarkisian married Loreal Smith, a former collegiate track star and coach, in 2020. Sarkisian and Smith announced they jointly filed for divorce in July 2024 but have since reconciled their differences. They have one son together.

== Head coaching record ==
Year	Team	Overall	Conference	Standing	Bowl/playoffs	Coaches^{#}	AP^{°}
Washington Huskies (Pacific-10/Pac-12 Conference) (2009–2013)
2009	Washington	5–7	4–5	7th			
2010	Washington	7–6	5–4	4th	W Holiday		
2011	Washington	7–6	5–4	3rd (North)	L Alamo		
2012	Washington	7–6	5–4	4th (North)	L Maaco		
2013	Washington	8–4 (Note: Sarkisian was Washington's head coach for the 12 regular season games of the 2013 season, but resigned before the Fight Hunger Bowl. Marques Tuiasosopo was appointed interim head coach for the bowl game, which Washington won. The Huskies finished the season with an overall record of 9–4.)	5–4	3rd (North)	Fight Hunger		25
Washington:		34–29	24–21				
USC Trojans (Pac-12 Conference) (2014–2015)
2014	USC	9–4	6–3	T–2nd (South)	W Holiday	21	20
2015	USC	3–2 (Note: Sarkisian was USC's head coach for the first five games of the 2015 season. October 11, 2015, Clay Helton was named interim head coach after Sarkisian took an indefinite leave of absence and was fired a day later. USC finished the year with an overall record of 8–6 with a conference mark of 6–3, tying for first in the Pac-12 Conference's South Division. The Trojans lost the 2015 Pac-12 Football Championship Game and the 2015 Holiday Bowl.)	1–2	(South)			
USC:		12–6	7–5				
Texas Longhorns (Big 12 Conference) (2021–2023)
2021	Texas	5–7	3–6	T–7th			
2022	Texas	8–5	6–3	3rd	L Alamo	25	25
2023	Texas	12–2	8–1	1st	L Sugar^{†}	4	3
Texas Longhorns (Southeastern Conference) (2024–present)
2024	Texas	13–3	7–1	1st	W CFP First Round^{†}, W Peach^{†}, L Cotton^{†}	3	4
2025	Texas	10–3	6–2	T–5th	W Citrus	13	12
2026	Texas	9–2	6–2				
Texas:		57–22	35–15				
Total:		103–57					
National championship Conference title Conference division title or championship game berth
^{†}Indicates CFP / New Years' Six bowl.; ^{#}Rankings from final Coaches Poll.; ^{°}Rankings from final AP Poll.

== See also ==
- List of NCAA major college football yearly passing leaders
