= Lee Vaughn =

American gridiron football player (born 1974)

Profile
- Position: Cornerback

Personal information
- Born: November 27, 1974 (age 51); Little Rock, Arkansas, U.S.
- Listed height: 5 ft 11 in (1.80 m)
- Listed weight: 184 lb (83 kg)

Career information
- High school: East (WY)
- College: Wyoming
- NFL draft: 1997: 6th round, 187th overall pick

Career history
- Dallas Cowboys (1997); Amsterdam Admirals (1999)*; Grand Rapids Rampage (2001)*; BC Lions (2001); Wichita Stealth (2003)
- * Offseason or practice squad member only

Awards and highlights
- All-WAC (1996)

Career CFL statistics
- Games played: 9

Lee Vaughn (born November 27, 1974) is an American former football cornerback in the National Football League (NFL) for the Dallas Cowboys. He also was a member of the BC Lions in the Canadian Football League (CFL). He played college football at the University of Wyoming.

== Early life ==
Vaughn attended East High School in Cheyenne, Wyoming, where he practiced football, basketball and track. As a senior, he received All-state honors at cornerback and return specialist. He also was named the Class 4A Back of the Year.

In track as a senior, he broke the state records in the 100 metres, 200 metres and long jump (originally set in 1963). He also received the Milward Simpson award, given annually to the state's outstanding prep athlete.

== College career ==
Vaughn accepted a football scholarship from the University of Wyoming. As a freshman, he was a backup player, making 10 tackles. As a sophomore, he started 11 games at free safety, tallying 65 tackles, one interception and 3 pass deflections. He also contributed to the team winning the WAC title with an 8–4 record.

As a junior, he was moved to the starting right cornerback position, registering 70 tackles (3 for loss), 3 interceptions, 14 pass deflections, one sack and one quarterback pressure.

As a senior, he registered 75 tackles (51 solo), one interception, 10 pass deflections and 2 fumble recoveries. He contributed to the team achieving a 10–1 regular season record, the WAC's Pacific title and a 22 ranking in the AP Poll. He finished his college career with 220 tackles (4 for loss), 5 interceptions and 27 pass deflections.

== Professional career ==
=== Dallas Cowboys ===
Vaughn was selected by the Dallas Cowboys in the sixth round (187th overall) of the 1997 NFL draft. On July 23, he tore the anterior cruciate ligament in his right knee and was placed on the injured reserve list on August 14. He was waived on August 24, 1998.

=== Amsterdam Admirals (NFLEL) ===
Vaughn was selected by the Amsterdam Admirals in the 19th round (111th overall) of the 1999 NFL Europe Draft. He was released on March 29.

=== Grand Rapids Rampage (AFL) ===
On July 3, 2001, he was signed by the Grand Rapids Rampage of the Arena Football League. He was released on July 6.

=== BC Lions (CFL) ===
On May 24, 2001, he was signed by the BC Lions of the Canadian Football League. He posted 38 defensive tackles, 2 special teams tackles, one interception and 2 fumble recoveries. He was released on October 1.

=== Wichita Stealth (AF2) ===
In 2003, he was signed by the Wichita Stealth of the AF2 League. In June, he suffered a torn anterior cruciate ligament and was placed on the injured reserve list.
