= Chris Gizzi =

American football player and coach (born 1975)

No. 57
- Position: Linebacker

Personal information
- Born: March 8, 1975 (age 51); Brunswick, Ohio, U.S.
- Listed height: 6 ft 0 in (1.83 m)
- Listed weight: 235 lb (107 kg)

Career information
- High school: St. Ignatius (Cleveland, Ohio)
- College: Air Force
- NFL draft: 1998: undrafted

Career history

Playing
- Denver Broncos (1998–1999); Green Bay Packers (2000–2001)

Coaching
- North Carolina (2013) Strength and conditioning assistant; Green Bay Packers (2014–2018) Strength and conditioning assistant; Green Bay Packers (2019–2024) Strength and conditioning coordinator

Awards and highlights
- Third-team All-American (1997)

Career NFL statistics
- Tackles: 28
- Forced fumbles: 1
- Stats at Pro Football Reference

Christopher Aaron Gizzi (born March 8, 1975) is an American football coach and former linebacker who was the strength and conditioning coordinator for the Green Bay Packers of the National Football League (NFL). He played for two seasons with the Packers with one start. Gizzi carried out the American flag for the Packers on the next game following the September 11 attacks and its ten-year anniversary.

== Early life ==
Gizzi was born on March 8, 1975, in Brunswick, Ohio. He is of Italian descent. He attended St. Ignatius High School where he was a two sport athlete, excelling in wrestling and football. His father is a retired English teacher at Center Middle School in Strongsville, Ohio.

== College career ==
Gizzi went to college at the United States Air Force Academy where he lettered in football in 1994, 1996, and 1997. He was named as the Western Athletic Conference Defensive Player of the Year in 1996 and 1997.

== Professional career ==
Gizzi was signed as an undrafted free agent by the Denver Broncos in 1998. He was listed on the Bronco's inactive roster while fulfilling his military obligation with the Air Force during the 1998 and 1999 football seasons.

Gizzi made the Green Bay Packers squad in 2000, playing in eleven games. He played in twelve games and had one start in 2001. He recorded five tackles, four assists, and one forced fumble that year. It was his final season in the league as a player.

During his time with the Packers, Gizzi led the team onto the field while carrying the American flag before the team's first game following the September 11 Attacks. Gizzi was a member of the U.S. Air Force Reserve at the time.

Gizzi, though out of the league for quite a few years, was honored by the Packers and carried the American flag on to the field during pregame ceremonies for the NFL season opener between the Saints and Packers held at Lambeau Field on September 8, 2011.

== NFL career statistics ==
=== Regular season ===
Year	Team	GP	GS	Tackles				Fumbles		Interceptions					
Year	Team	GP	GS	Comb	Solo	Ast	Sack	FF	FR	Int	Yds	Avg	Lng	TD	PD
2000	GB	11	0	8	7	1	0.0	0	0	0	0	0	0	0	0
2001	GB	12	1	20	15	5	0.0	1	0	0	0	0	0	0	0
Career		23	1	28	22	6	0.0	1	0	0	0	0	0	0	0

== Coach ==
Gizzi was the Strength and Conditioning Coach for the University of North Carolina football team in 2013. He founded and ran a strength and conditioning business called Atlas Performance in downtown Chicago in 2010 with his wife, Jennifer Gizzi. He had a brief stint at the University of North Carolina as a Strength and Conditioning assistant before he was then named as the Green Bay Packers coach of the same role on February 7, 2014. On February 18, 2019, Gizzi was promoted to Strength & Conditioning Coordinator for the Packers. The Packers relieved Gizzi of his duties on January 25, 2024.
