= Marcus Harris (wide receiver, born 1974) =

American football player (born 1974)

No. 23
- Position: Wide receiver

Personal information
- Born: October 11, 1974 (age 52); St. Paul, Minnesota, U.S.
- Listed height: 6 ft 1 in (1.85 m)
- Listed weight: 213 lb (97 kg)

Career information
- High school: Brooklyn Center (Brooklyn Center, Minnesota)
- College: Wyoming
- NFL draft: 1997: 7th round, 232nd overall pick

Career history
- Detroit Lions (1997)*
- * Offseason or practice squad member only

Awards and highlights
- Fred Biletnikoff Award (1996); Paul Warfield Trophy (1996); Consensus All-American (1996); First-team All-American (1995)

Marcus Harris (born October 11, 1974) is an American former college football player who was a wide receiver for the Wyoming Cowboys. He was a two-time All-American, including a consensus selection in 1996, when he also won the Fred Biletnikoff Award as the season's outstanding college football receiver.

== Early life ==
Harris was born in 1974. He attended Brooklyn Center High School in Brooklyn Center, Minnesota, where he was a star running back for the Brooklyn Center Centaurs high school football team.

== College career ==
Harris received an athletic scholarship to attend the University of Wyoming, and he played for the Wyoming Cowboys football team from 1993 to 1996. As a senior in 1996, Harris was recognized as a consensus first-team All-American and won the Biletnikoff Award. He finished his career at Wyoming with 259 receptions, 4,518 receiving yards, and 38 touchdown catches. Harris was inducted into the Wyoming Athletics Hall of Fame on September 24, 2004.

=== Statistics ===
Wyoming Cowboys
Season	Receiving					Rushing			Punt returns			
Season	Rec	Yards	Avg	Yds/G	TD	Att	Yards	TD	Att	Yards	Avg	TD
1993	1	14	14.0	1.3	0	0	0	0	0	0	--	0
1994	71	1,431	20.2	119.3	11	2	-1	0	0	0	--	0
1995	78	1,423	18.2	129.4	14	4	14	0	0	0	--	0
1996	109	1,650	15.1	137.5	13	0	0	0	20	187	9.4	0
Career	259	4,518	17.4	98.2	38	6	13	0	20	187	9.4	0

== Professional career ==
Pre-draft measurables
Height	Weight	Arm length	Hand span	40-yard dash	10-yard split	20-yard split	20-yard shuttle	Three-cone drill	Vertical jump
6 ft 1 3/8 in (1.86 m)	213 lb (97 kg)	32 3/4 in (0.83 m)	9 7/8 in (0.25 m)	4.68 s	1.62 s	2.72 s	4.09 s	7.42 s	34.0 in (0.86 m)

He was drafted by the Detroit Lions in the seventh round (232nd overall pick) of the 1997 NFL draft. He is the only Biletnikoff Award winner to never play in a National Football League (NFL) regular season game and Harris never played professional football in any league.

He is currently head coach for the football, softball, and girls basketball teams at the Breck School.

== See also ==
- List of NCAA major college football yearly receiving leaders
