= WAC Championship Game =

Annual college football game

WAC football championship game
- Conference football championship
- Sport: Football
- Conference: Western Athletic Conference
- Played: 1996–1998
- Last contest: 1998
- Most championships: Air Force, BYU, Colorado State (1)
- TV partner: ESPN on ABC

Host stadiums
- Sam Boyd Stadium (1996–1998)

Host locations
- Whitney, Nevada (1996–1998)

The Western Athletic Conference football championship game was an annual postseason college football game played to determine the champion of the Western Athletic Conference (WAC).

== History ==
The Western Athletic Conference staged a conference title football game during the three years (1996–1998) the league consisted of sixteen members. During this time, the league was split into two divisions, Pacific and Mountain, with eight teams in each division. The top finisher in each division played for the championship, which was held at Sam Boyd Stadium in the Las Vegas Valley. When conference membership was cut in half in 1999 with the formation of the Mountain West Conference, both the championship game and two-division format were discontinued. All participants in the three title games were among the defections to Mountain West.

== Results ==
=== Results by year ===
Below are the results from all WAC Football Championship Games played. The winning team appears in bold font, on a background of their primary team color. Rankings are from the AP Poll released prior to the game.

Year	Mountain		Pacific		Site	Attendance	Ref
1996	6 **BYU**	**28**	20 Wyoming	25 (OT)	Sam Boyd Stadium • Whitney, NV	41,238	
1997	New Mexico	13	20 Colorado State	**41**	Sam Boyd Stadium • Whitney, NV	12,706	
1998	17 **Air Force**	**20**	BYU	13	Sam Boyd Stadium • Whitney, NV	32,745	

=== Results by team ===
Team	Appearances	Record	PCT.	PF	PA
BYU	2	1–1	.500	41	45
Air Force	1	1–0	1.000	20	13
Colorado State	1	1–0	1.000	41	13
New Mexico	1	0–1	.000	13	41
Wyoming	1	0–1	.000	25	28

=== No results by team ===
School
Fresno State
Hawaii
Rice
San Diego State
San Jose State
SMU
TCU
Tulsa
UNLV
Utah
UTEP

== See also ==
- List of NCAA Division I FBS conference championship games
