= List of Maryland Terrapins starting quarterbacks =

This is a list of the individuals who have played college football as a starting quarterback at the University of Maryland. The Maryland Terrapins have produced several prominent quarterbacks. Starting with three consecutive Atlantic Coast Conference (ACC) championships from 1983 to 1985, the program was sometimes referred to as "Quarterback U". Since then, Maryland quarterbacks Boomer Esiason, Frank Reich, Stan Gelbaugh, Neil O'Donnell, Scott Zolak, and Scott Milanovich have been considered part of that tradition.

== Quarterbacks ==
Players are listed in order of game experience. The number of games the player started during the season is listed to the right of their name from seasons 2014–2024. In years prior, individuals who started at least one game in a season are denoted with their name in boldface text.

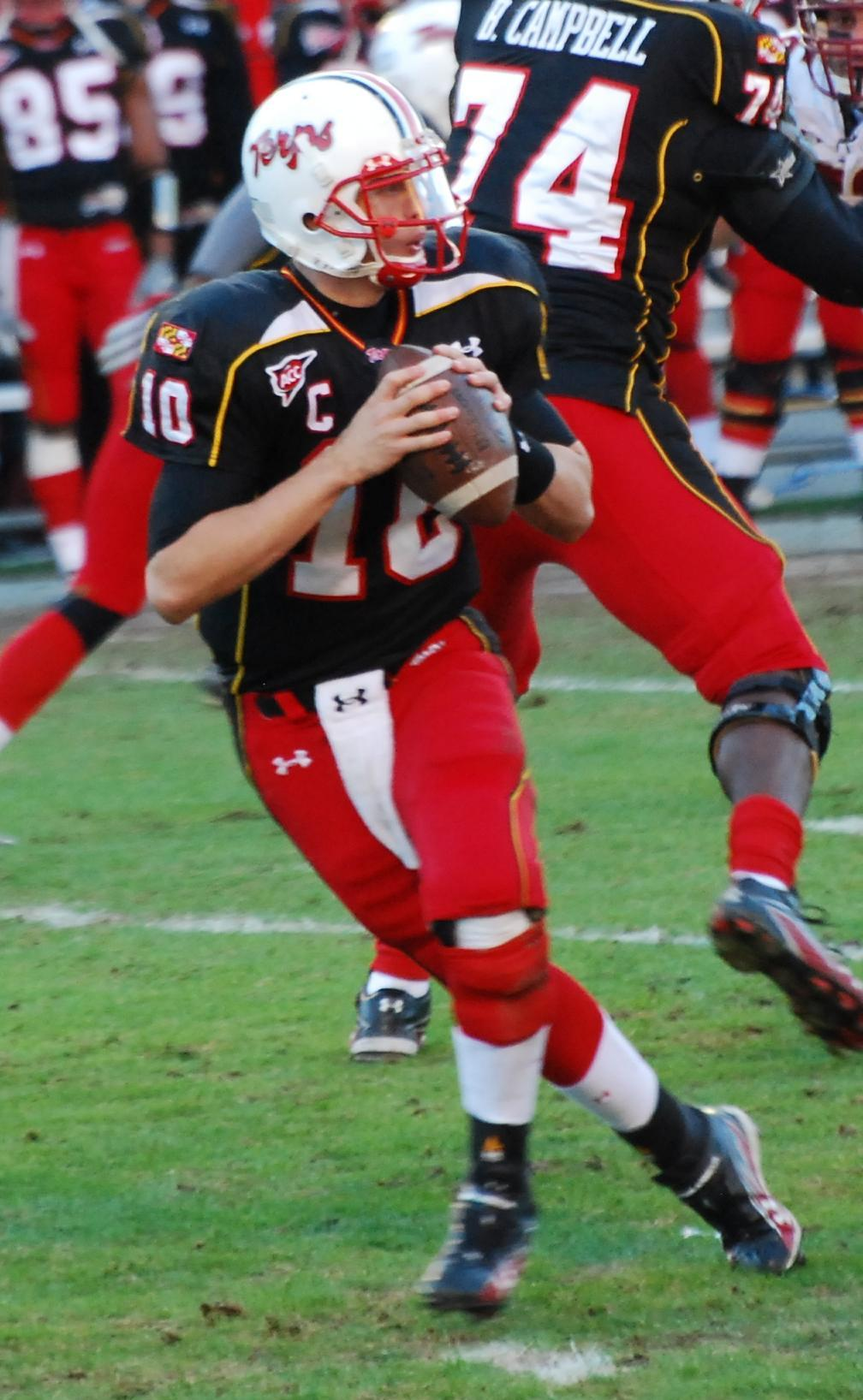
Chris Turner, 2007–2009

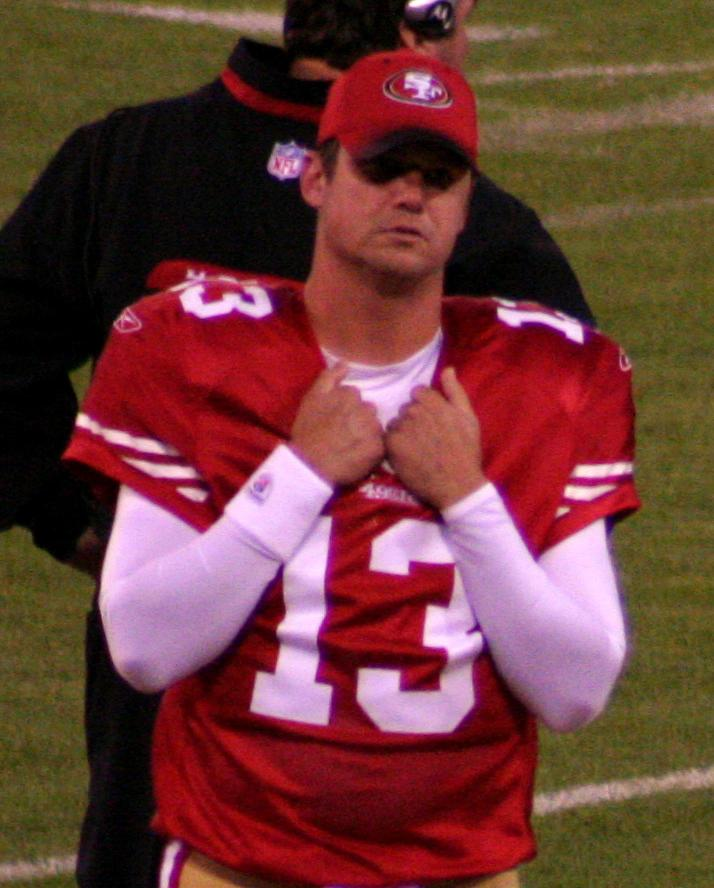
Shaun Hill, 2000–2001

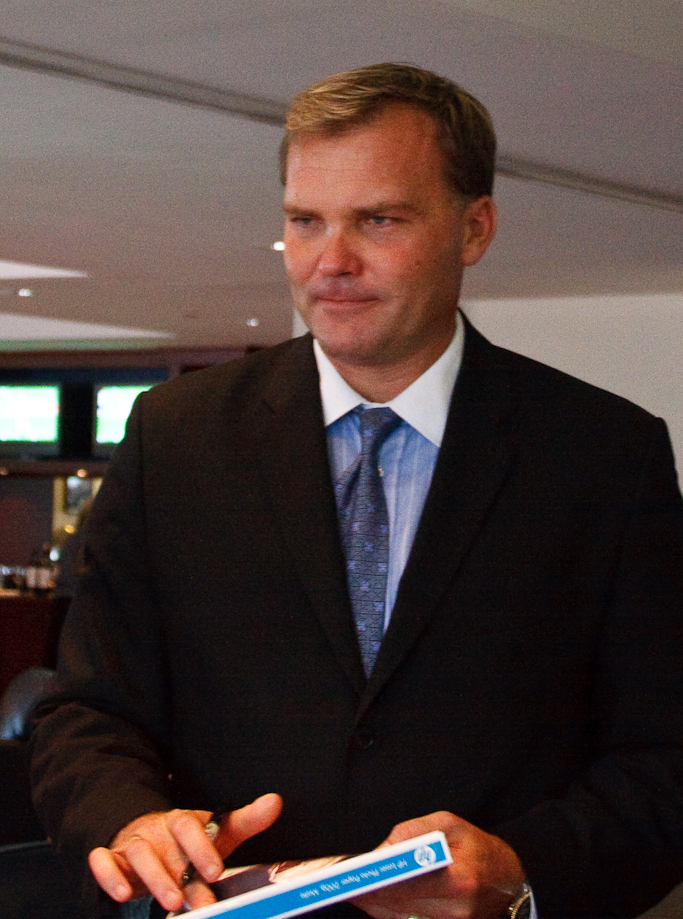
Scott Zolak, 1989–1990

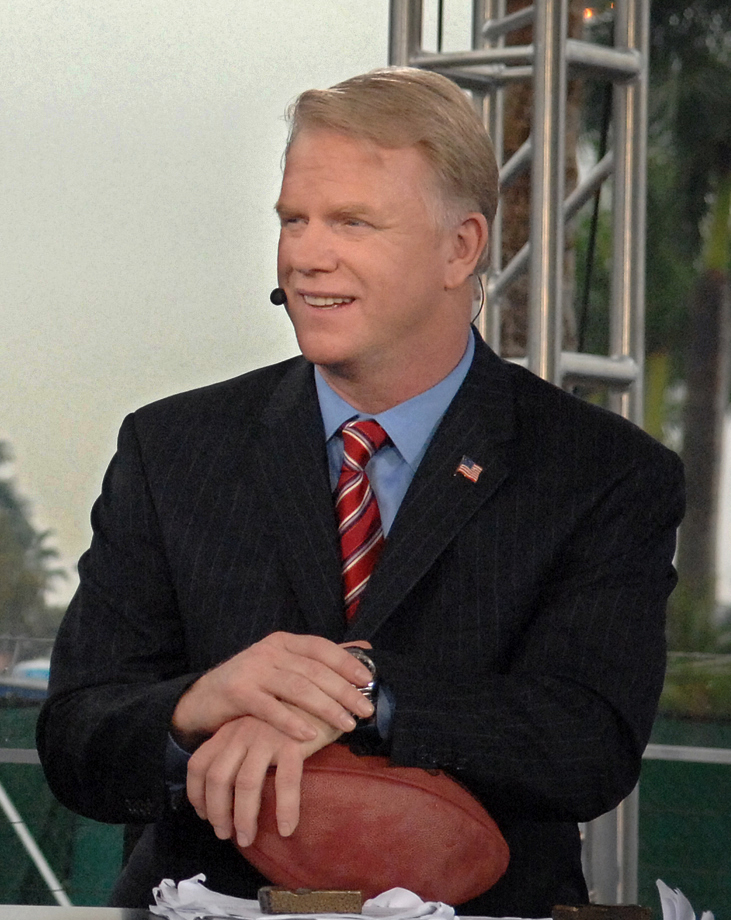
Boomer Esiason, 1981–1983

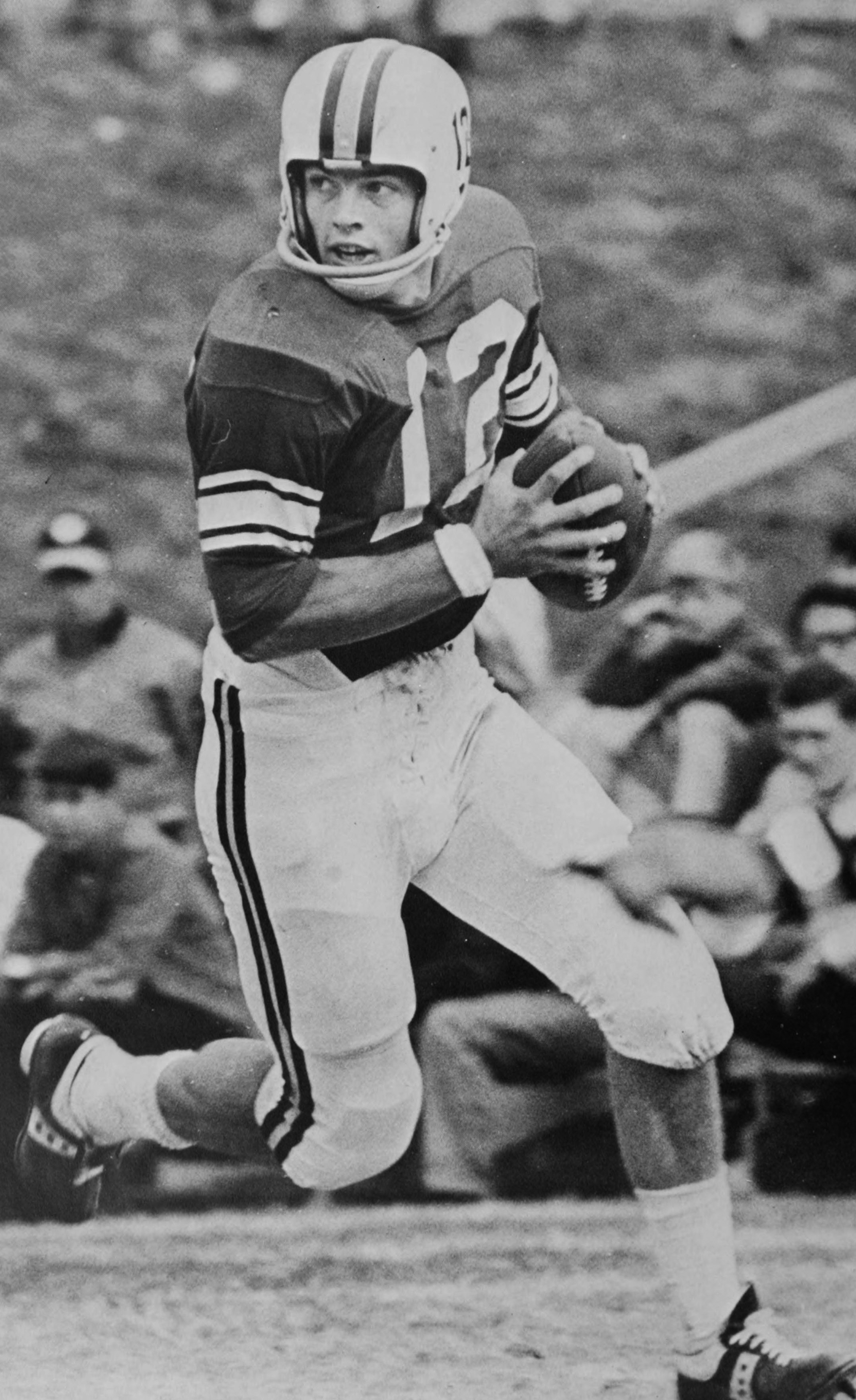
Alan Pastrana, 1966–1968

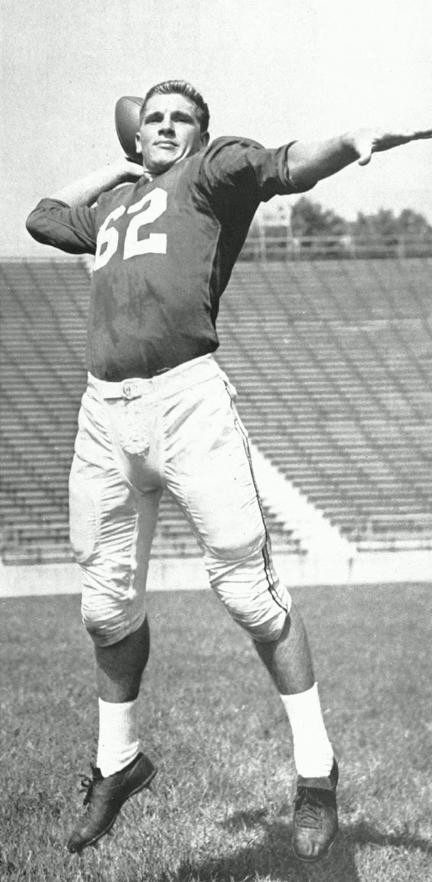
Jack Scarbath, 1950–1952

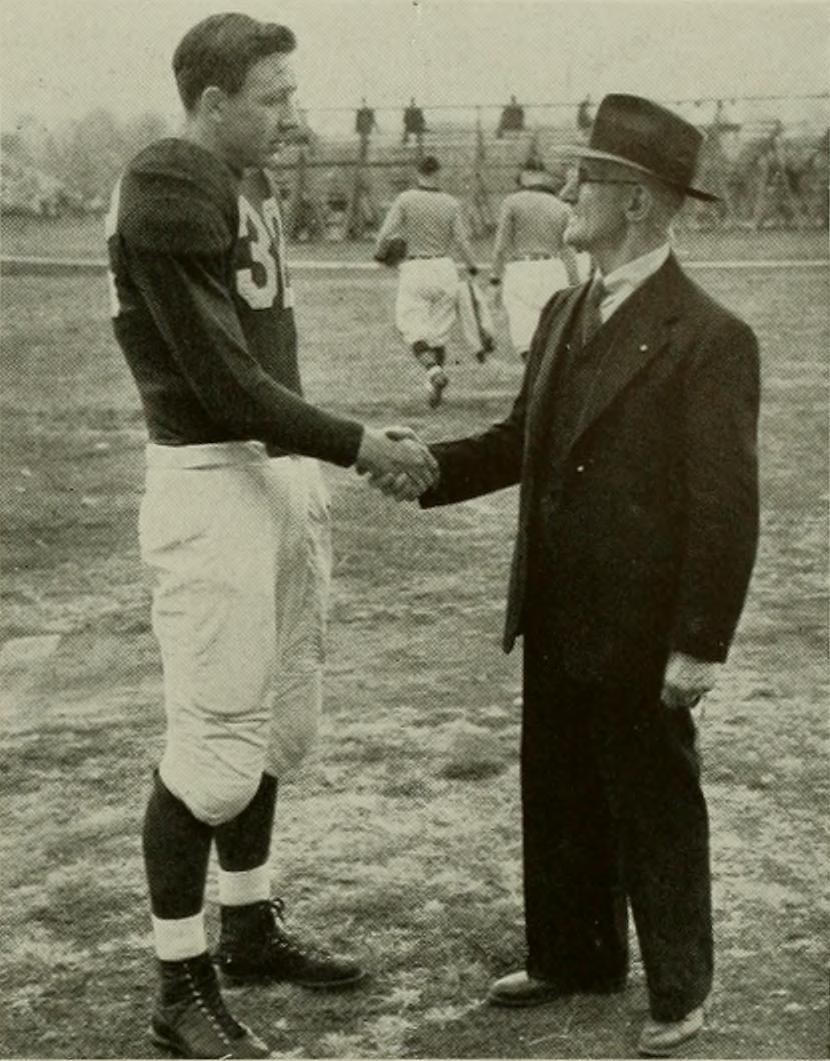
Tommy Mont, 1941–1942 and 1946, and William W. Skinner, 1892

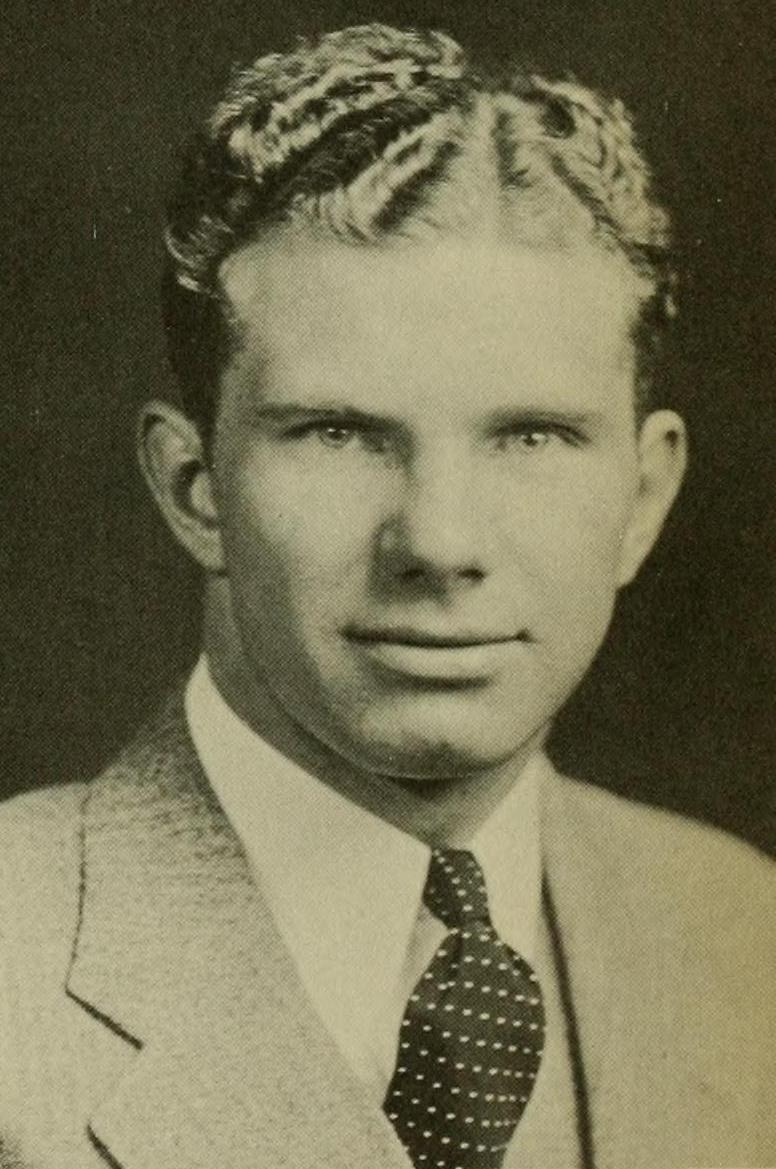
Ray Poppelman, 1930–1932

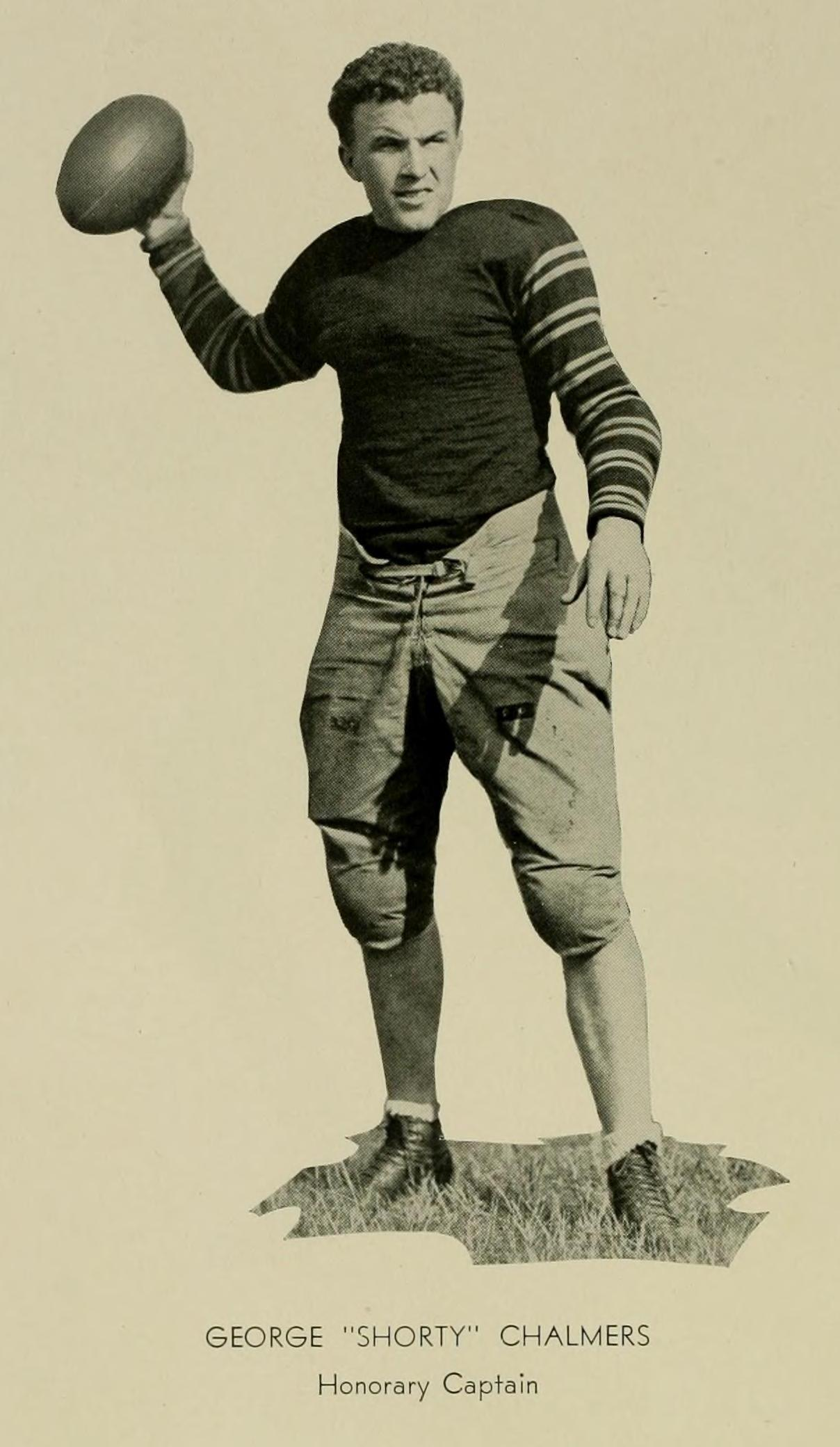
George V. Chalmers, 1929–1931

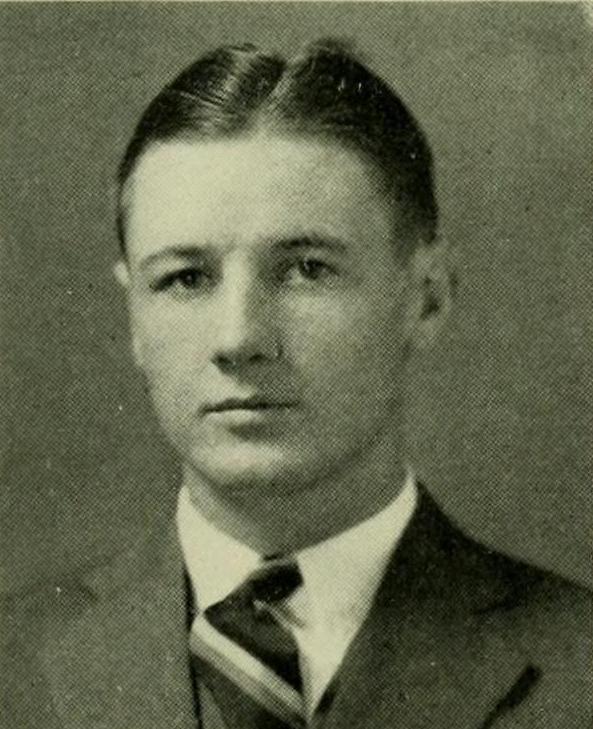
William W. Evans, 1928 and 1930

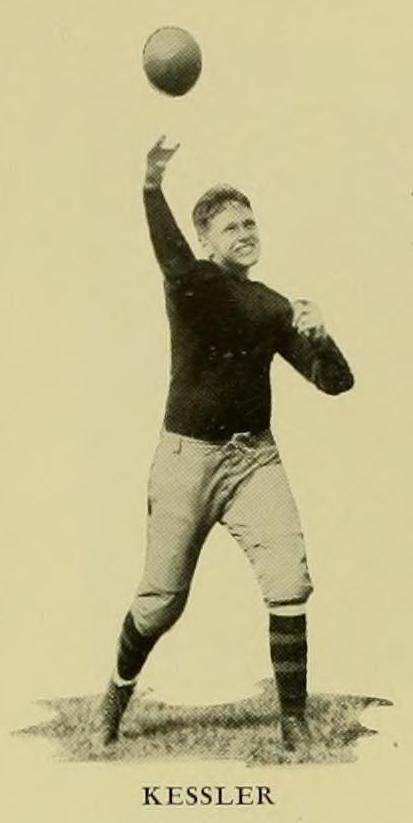
Gordon Kessler, 1926–1928

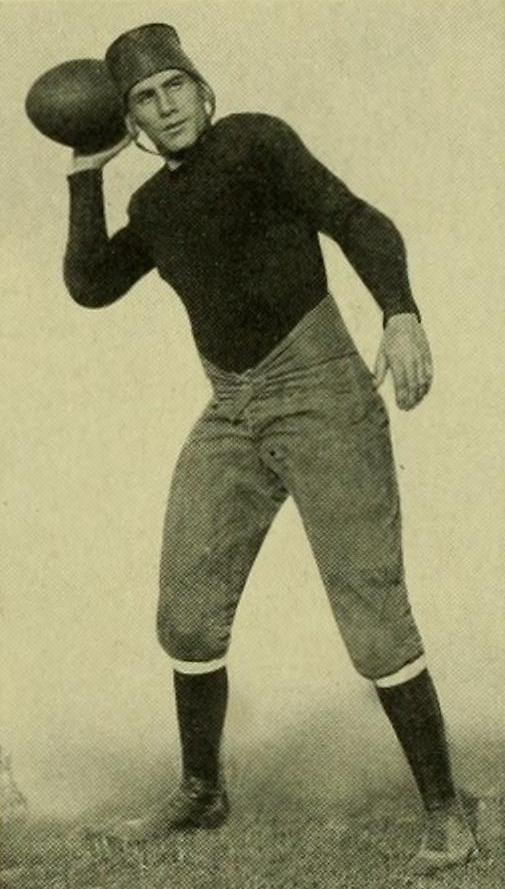
Kirkland Besley, 1923–1924

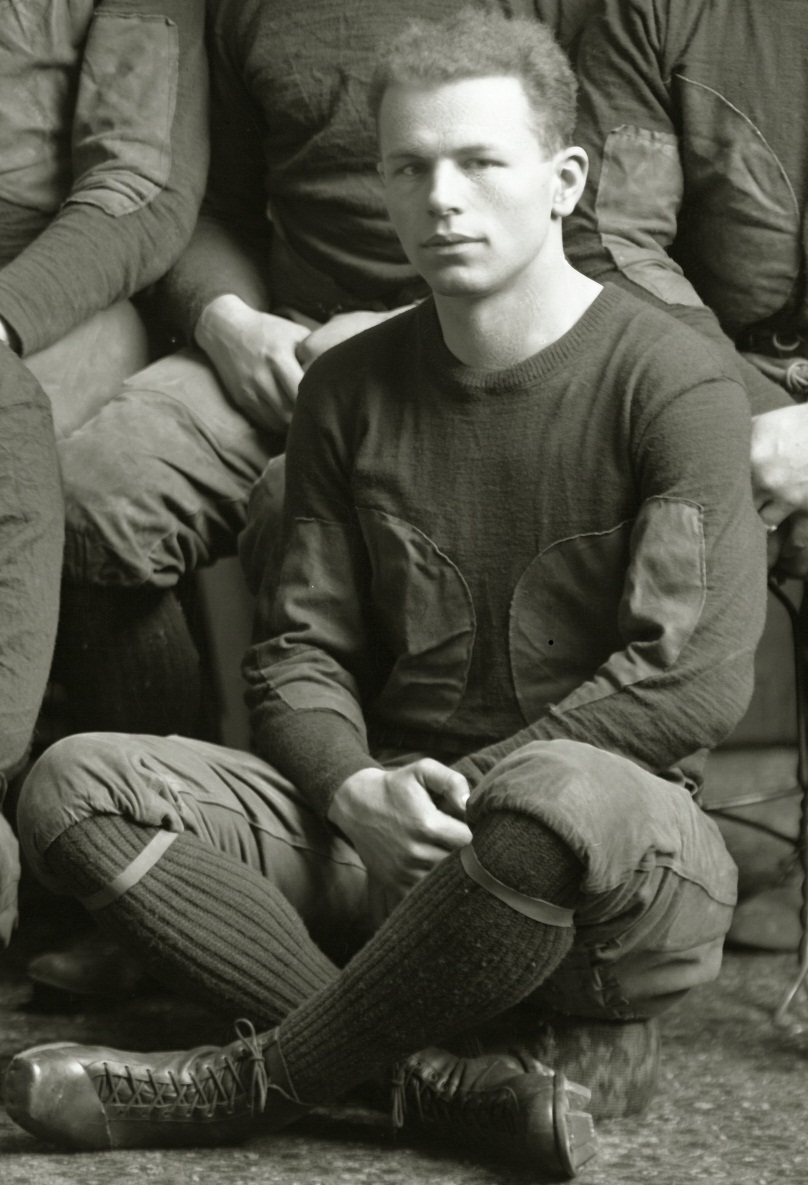
R. T. Knode, 1916–1919

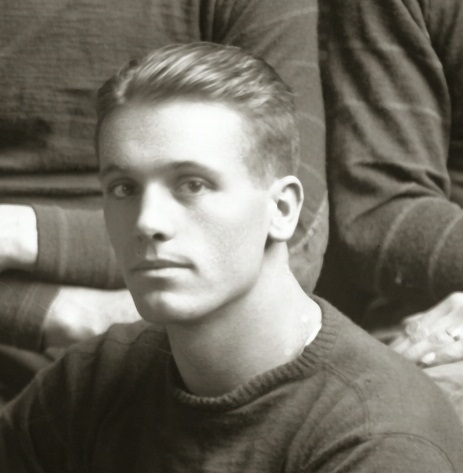
Kenneth T. Knode, 1911–1915

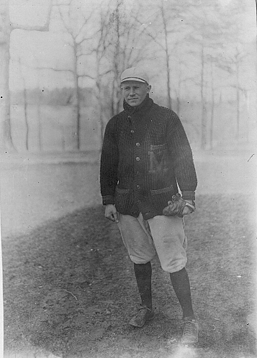
Burton Shipley, 1908–1913

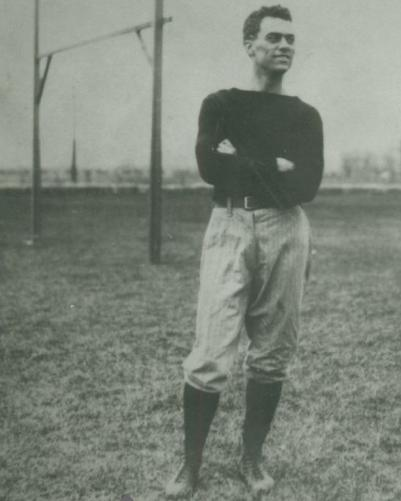
Curley Byrd, 1906–1907

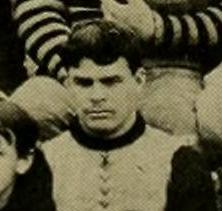
Frank Kenly, 1896–1898

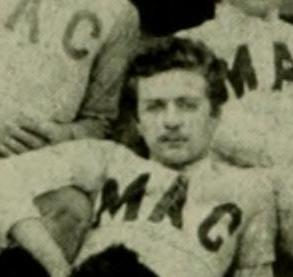
William W. Skinner, 1892

Year	Name	Notes
2025	Malik Washington (12)	First true freshman to start for Maryland since 2012, ninth overall.
2024	Billy Edwards Jr. (11)	Started first eleven games of the season.
2024	MJ Morris (1)	Started final game of the season.
2023	Taulia Tagovailoa (12)	Second-team All-Big Ten. Polynesian Collegiate Football Player of the Year.
2023	Billy Edwards Jr. (1)	Music City Bowl MVP.
2022	Taulia Tagovailoa (11)	Second-team All Big Ten.
2022	Billy Edwards Jr. (2)	Made first career start against Northwestern.
2021	Taulia Tagovailoa (13)	Started every game of the season. Pinstripe Bowl MVP. Backup Reece Udinski made four appearances.
2020	Taulia Tagovailoa (4)	Started first four games of the season.
2020	Lance LeGendre (1)	Started final game of the season.
2019	Josh Jackson (9)	
2019	Tyrrell Pigrome (3)	
2018	Kasim Hill (10)	
2018	Tyrrell Pigrome (2)	
2017	Tyrrell Pigrome (1)	Started season opener against Texas.
2017	Kasim Hill (2)	Started games two and three. First career start was against Towson.
2017	Max Bortenschlager (8)	Started games 4–9, 11–12.
2017	Ryan Brand (1)	Made first career start against Michigan in game ten.
2016	Perry Hills (11)	Started eleven games at quarterback.
2016	Tyrrell Pigrome (1)	Made first career start against Minnesota.
2016	Max Bortenschlager (1)	Made first career start against Nebraska.
2015	Perry Hills (8)	Started eight of 12 games, including season opener.
2015	Caleb Rowe (4)	Appeared in 10 games, making four starts at quarterback and also serving as holder.
2014	C. J. Brown (13)	Started every game of the season.
2013	**C. J. Brown**	Played in all but two games.
2013	**Caleb Rowe**	Saw mid-season starting duties in injury relief.
2013	Ricardo Young	Made rushing attempts in two games.
2012	**Perry Hills**	Started first six games, before suffering a season-ending injury against NC State.
2012	**Shawn Petty**	Linebacker (played quarterback in high school); started final four games.
2012	**Caleb Rowe**	Appeared against NC State and started against Boston College, before suffering a season-ending injury in that game.
2012	Devin Burns	Appeared against Virginia and NC State, before suffering a season-ending injury in that game.
2012	C. J. Brown	Injured before the opening game; lost for the season.
2011	**Danny O'Brien**	Started against Miami, West Virginia, Temple, Towson, and Georgia Tech
2011	**C. J. Brown**	Started against Clemson; appeared against Temple, Towson, and Georgia Tech
2010	**Danny O'Brien**	Started ten games after Robinson suffered a shoulder injury; remained starter for remainder of the season. Named ACC Rookie of the Year.
2010	**Jamarr Robinson**	Started against Navy, Morgan State, and West Virginia.
2010	C. J. Brown	Saw action against Morgan State, in which he broke his clavicle.
2010	Tony Logan	Wide receiver; lined up as wildcat quarterback against FIU.
2009	**Chris Turner**	Started first nine games, before suffering an injury against NC State.
2009	**Jamarr Robinson**	Appeared against California and NC State. Started last three games in place of Turner.
2009	Torrey Smith	Wide receiver; lined up as wildcat quarterback against Virginia.
2008	**Chris Turner**	Started 12 of 13 games.
2008	**Jordan Steffy**	Started season-opener against Delaware, suffered season-ending broken thumb on throwing hand.
2008	Josh Portis	Saw limited game action of 38 snaps, mostly in a "change of pace" role due to dual-threat ability.
2008	Da'Rel Scott	Running back; limited role as a wildcat quarterback.
2007	**Chris Turner**	Started last eight games after Steffy was injured.
2007	**Jordan Steffy**	Started first five games, but suffered a season-ending concussion against Rutgers.
2006	**Sam Hollenbach**	Started all 13 games. Champs Sports Bowl MVP.
2006	Jordan Steffy	Saw limited game action, with five pass attempts against William & Mary.
2005	**Sam Hollenbach**	Started ten out of eleven games.
2005	**Joel Statham**	Started against Florida State as a replacement for injured Hollenbach, and saw action in a total of three games.
2004	**Joel Statham**	Started ten games.
2004	**Sam Hollenbach**	Started one game, participated in three total.
2004	Jordan Steffy	Saw action as a back-up in six games.
2004	Ryan Mitch	Saw action in one game with one completion on one pass attempt.
2003	**Scott McBrien**	Started all 13 games. Gator Bowl MVP.
2003	Joel Statham	Saw action in six games.
2003	Orlando Evans	Saw action in five games.
2002	**Scott McBrien**	Started all 14 games. Peach Bowl Offensive MVP.
2002	Chris Kelley	Saw action as a back-up in ten games.
2002	Orlando Evans	Saw limited game action with one incomplete pass attempt.
2001	**Shaun Hill**	Started all 12 games. Second team All-ACC.
2001	Latrez Harrison	Saw action in four games; converted to wide receiver for the 2002 and 2003 seasons.
2000	**Calvin McCall**	Started first eight games.
2000	**Shaun Hill**	Started the opener, in which he sprained his shoulder and missed much of the season. He returned to start the last two games.
1999	**Calvin McCall**	Started nine games.
1999	**Latrez Harrison**	Started last two games, replaced McCall after he suffered a torn MCL.
1999	Trey Evans	
1999	Randall Jones	Saw action in season-opener as quarterback, then converted to a safety. Moved back to quarterback to replace Harrison in the finale.
1998	**Ken Mastrole**	Started seven games.
1998	**Randall Jones**	Started four games in a change of pace role due in part to Mastrole's ineffectiveness. Jones was the first true freshman to start at quarterback for Maryland.
1997	**Brian Cummings**	
1997	Ken Mastrole	
1997	Trey Evans	
1996	**Brian Cummings**	
1996	**Ken Mastrole**	First-ever redshirt freshman quarterback to start at Maryland, started three games, suffered broken clavicle against Duke.
1996	Keon Russell	Sophomore transfer from American International College, saw action against Duke after Mastrole was injured.
1995	**Brian Cummings**	Started six games.
1995	**Scott Milanovich**	Started five games after four-game NCAA suspension for gambling on college sports.
1995	Orlando Strozier	Appeared against Tulane in relief of Cummings who suffered a sprained ankle
1994	**Scott Milanovich**	Maryland ranked 10th in the nation in passing. Second team All-ACC.
1994	**Kevin Foley**	Started against Wake Forest, appeared against West Virginia. Transferred to Boston University at end of season. Younger brother of Glenn Foley.
1994	Brian Cummings	Saw action in six games, but did not attempt a pass. Used in goal-line situations.
1993	**Scott Milanovich**	Third team All-ACC. Set Maryland single-season passing records at 3,499 yards and 26 touchdowns.
1993	**Kevin Foley**	Saw game action versus top ranked Florida State, where he ran for a touchdown.
1992	**John Kaleo**	Set Maryland single-season passing record at 3,392 yards.
1991	**Jim Sandwisch**	Suffered elbow injury on throwing arm against Syracuse, which reduced playing time. Originally a walk-on punter in 1987.
1991	**John Kaleo**	Kaleo started against West Virginia in place of Sandwisch.
1991	Tony Scarpino	
1990	**Scott Zolak**	Four-time ACC Offensive Back of the Week (Virginia Tech, West Virginia, Duke, and Virginia).
1990	Jim Sandwisch	Saw limited action as back-up to Zolak.
1989	**Neil O'Donnell**	
1989	Scott Zolak	Appeared in eight games.
1988	**Neil O'Donnell**	
1988	Scott Zolak	Appeared in four games. Replaced injured O'Donnell in finale against Virginia.
1987	**Dan Henning**	
1987	Neil O'Donnell	
1986	**Dan Henning**	Set Maryland single-season passing record at 2,725 yards.
1985	**Stan Gelbaugh**	Cherry Bowl MVP. Set Maryland single-season passing record at 2,475 yards.
1985	Dan Henning	
1984	**Frank Reich**	Started the first four games until he suffered a shoulder separation against Wake Forest. Against Miami, Reich came off the bench to lead Maryland to the greatest comeback in college football history; he later repeated the feat in the NFL.
1984	**Stan Gelbaugh**	Replaced Reich after he was injured against Wake Forest
1983	**Boomer Esiason**	Finished tenth in Heisman Trophy voting. Second-team All-American. Set Maryland single-season passing record at 2,322 yards.
1983	Frank Reich	
1982	**Boomer Esiason**	Set Maryland single-season passing record at 2,302 yards and 18 touchdowns.
1981	**Boomer Esiason**	Became the starter after Dewitz and Milkovich suffered injuries in season opener
1981	**Brent Dewitz**	Started against Vanderbilt, and replaced by Milkovich after suffering sprained knee
1981	Bob Milkovich	
1980	**Mike Tice**	
1980	Bob Milkovich	Replaced Tice after a bruised hip against Wake Forest.
1980	Brent Dewitz	Appeared in 11 games: Navy,
1979	**Mike Tice**	
1979	**Bob Milkovich**	Started over Tice against Wake Forest.
1978	**Tim O'Hare**	
1978	Mike Tice	
1977	**Larry Dick**	
1977	**Mark Manges**	Pre-season Heisman Trophy candidate, broke his hand mid-season.
1976	**Mark Manges**	First team All-ACC.
1975	**Larry Dick**	Started six games, while Manges convalesced from shoulder injury.
1975	**Mark Manges**	Started first two games, suffered shoulder separation against Tennessee.
1974	**Bob Avellini**	Set Maryland single-season passing record at 1,648 yards.
1974	Mark Manges	
1974	Ben Kinard	
1973	**Al Neville**	
1973	Bob Avellini	
1973	Ben Kinard	
1972	**Bob Avellini**	
1972	Al Neville	
1971	**Al Neville**	
1971	Jeff Shugars	
1970	**Jeff Shugars**	Started first three games, but lost starting job for four games midseason; became starter again against Clemson
1970	**Bob Tucker**	Started against Miami, NC State South Carolina, and Syracuse; first black quarterback to start for Maryland; moved to safety in 1971.
1969	Jeff Shugars	
1969	**Dennis O'Hara**	Converted to tight end.
1968	**Alan Pastrana**	
1968	Chuck Drimal	
1968	Dennis O'Hara	
1967	**Chuck Drimal**	Five quarterbacks saw action during the season, including three starters. Pastrana sat out the season with a knee injury suffered in spring practice. Most efficient passer, 26–43 for 287 yards.
1967	**Jim Sniscak**	54–123 for 669 yards; started finale against Virginia.
1967	Joe Tomcho	
1967	?	
1967	?	
1966	**Alan Pastrana**	Set ACC record with 14 passing touchdowns. Set school passing record with 1,499 yards. Set Maryland single-season passing record at 1,499 yards.
1965	**Phil Petry**	
1964	**Ken Ambrusko**	Mobile quarterback, entered season as centerpiece of the offense, but dislocated elbow in season-opener against Oklahoma.
1964	**Phil Petry**	Drop-back passer, sophomore reserve, played most of the season after Ambrusko's injury.
1963	**Dick Shiner**	
1962	**Dick Shiner**	Set Maryland single-season passing record at 1,324 yards.
1962	Don White	
1962	King Corcoran	
1961	**Dick Shiner**	
1961	**Dick Novak**	
1960	**Dale Betty**	
1960	**Dick Novak**	
1959	**Dale Betty**	
1959	**Dick Novak**	
1958	**Bob Rusevlyan**	
1958	Dale Betty	
1958	Dick Scarbath	
1957	**Bob Rusevlyan**	
1957	John Fritsch	
1956	**John Fritsch**	In addition to being season passing leader, Fritsch set a school record with an 88-yard punt again Miami.
1956	Bob Rusevlyan	
1956	Dickie Lewis	
1955	**Frank Tamburello**	
1955	Lynn Beightol	
1955	John Fritsch	
1954	**Charlie Boxold**	
1954	Frank Tamburello	Saw significant playing time as a reserve.
1954	Lynn Beightol	
1953	**Bernie Faloney**	Injured mid-season, replaced by Boxold as starter. Finished fourth in Heisman Trophy voting. First-team All-American.
1953	**Charlie Boxold**	
1953	Lynn Beightol	
1952	**Jack Scarbath**	Runner-up in Heisman Trophy voting. First team All-American by unanimous consensus. Set Maryland single-season passing record at 1,149 yards.
1952	Bernie Faloney	
1952	Bob DeStefano	
1951	**Jack Scarbath**	
1951	Bernie Faloney	
1951	Lynn Beightol	
1950	**Jack Scarbath**	
1950	**Bob DeStefano**	Filled in for injured Scarbath against George Washington, North Carolina, West Virginia, and Virginia Tech.
1949	**Stan Lavine**	
1949	Joe Tucker	
1948	**Vic Turyn**	
1948	Stan Lavine	
1948	Joe Tucker	
1947	**Vic Turyn**	
1947	Joe Tucker	
1946	**Vic Turyn**	
1946	Tommy Mont	
1945	**Vic Turyn**	
1944	**Sal Fastuca**	
1943	**Joe Makar**	
1942	**Tommy Mont**	
1941	**Tommy Mont**	
1941	Mearle DuVall	
1940	**Mearle DuVall**	
1940	Joe Murphy	
1939	**Mearle DuVall**	
1939	Joe Murphy	
1938	**Charlie Weidinger**	
1937	**Charlie Weidinger**	
1936	**Charlie Weidinger**	
1935	**Jack Stonebraker**	
1935	**Coleman Headley**	
1934	**Norwood Sothoron**	
1934	Jack Stonebraker	
1934	Earl Widmyer	
1933	**Richard "Dick" Nelson**	Started against VMI, Johns Hopkins, Tulane.
1933	Earl Widmyer	
1933	Joseph Crecca	Substituted for Nelson in Duke game. Played against Johns Hopkins.
1932	**Ray Poppelman**	Started against Virginia, Navy, and Washington College.
1932	**Al Woods**	Started against St. John's.
1932	Norwood Sothoron	Substituted for Poppelman against Navy and Washington College.
1931	**Ray Poppelman**	
1931	**George "Shorty" Chalmers**	
1931	**Al Woods**	Started against Western Maryland
1930	**Ray Poppelman**	Started against Navy.
1930	**Al Woods**	Started against Western Maryland, Yale.
1930	**Bill "Moon" Evans**	Started against Johns Hopkins. Substituted for Poppelman in Navy game.
1930	George "Shorty" Chalmers	Starting halfback, but frequent passer in Byrd's double-wing offense.
1929	**Bill "Moon" Evans**	
1929	Augie Robertson	Reserve quarterback.
1929	George "Shorty" Chalmers	Starting halfback, but frequent passer in Byrd's double-wing offense.
1928	**Gordon Kessler**	Regular starter.
1928	**Bill "Moon" Evans**	Started in place of Kessler for the Yale game.
1927	**Gordon Kessler**	
1927	Augie Roberts	
1926	**Gordon Kessler**	Started against Johns Hopkins.
1926	Edward Tenney	
1925	**Edward Tenney**	Started against Yale and Rutgers.
1924	**Arthur Kirkland "Kirk" Besley**	All-Maryland selection.
1924	**Bill Supplee**	Started against Yale.
1924	George Heine	Reserve quarterback, saw action "in nearly every game".
1923	**Johnny "Boots" Groves**	Started against Yale.
1923	Cecil "Tubby" Branner	
1923	Arthur Kirkland "Kirk" Besley	
1922	**Johnny "Boots" Groves**	Started against Yale.
1922	Henry Gurevitch	Substituted for Groves against Yale.
1922	Eddie Semler	
1921	**Johnny "Boots" Groves**	Started against Syracuse.
1921	Eddie Semler	
1920	**Johnny "Boots" Groves**	Started against Syracuse.
1920	Herbert "Herb" Gilbert	
1920	Eddie Semler	
1919	**R. T. "Bobby" Knode**	Brother of Kenneth Knode, Maryland quarterback (1911–1915). Started against Johns Hopkins.
1919	Johnny "Boots" Groves	
1918	**R. T. "Bobby" Knode**	
1917	**R. T. "Bobby" Knode**	
1916	**R. T. "Bobby" Knode**	
1916	**Jamie Smith**	Started game against NYU.
1915	**Ken Knode**	Second team Spalding's All-Maryland Eleven.
1914	**Ken Knode**	
1913	Ken Knode	
1913	Lynn Loomis	
1912	Burton Shipley	
1912	Ken Knode	
1912	Lynn Loomis	
1911	Burton Shipley	
1911	Ken Knode	
1911	Walter Furst	
1910	Burton Shipley	
1909	Burton Shipley	
1909	Jimmy Burns	
1908	Ernest Cory	
1908	Jack Crapster	
1907	**Curley Byrd**	
1906	**Curley Byrd**	The forward pass was legalized this season. As a grad student at Georgetown, Byrd later became "the first quarterback in the East to master the forward pass".
1906	Guy Firor	
1905	Harold John Caul	
1905	Pete Galt	
1904	J. V. Gill	
1903	Edmund C. Mayo	
1902	Joshua Marsh Matthews	
1901	T. E. "Tom" Bryan	
1901	J. Marsh Matthews	
1900	E. DuVal Dickey	
1900	J. Marsh Matthews	
1899	**Earl Neilson Sappington**	Also served as manager.
1899	Andy Grayson	
1898	**J. Frank Kenly**	Also served as team captain/coach.
1898	Andy Grayson	
1897	**J. Frank Kenly**	
1896	J. Frank Kenly	
1896	Hanson Mitchell	
1895	N/A	No team fielded.
1894	George Harris	
1893	Howard Strickler	
1892	**Will Skinner**	Quarterback and player-coach for Maryland's first officially recognized football team.
1892	Clifton Fuller	
1892	Pearse Prough	
1891	Jack Brooks	
1890	Jack Brooks	
