= 1996 Maryland Terrapins football team =

American college football season

1996 Maryland Terrapins football
- Conference: Atlantic Coast Conference
- Record: 5–6 (3–5 ACC)
- Head coach: Mark Duffner (5th season)
- Offensive coordinator: Dan Dorazio (5th season)
- Defensive coordinator: Kevin Coyle (3rd season)
- Home stadium: Byrd Stadium

1996 Atlantic Coast Conference football standings
	Conf.			Overall
Team	W		L	W		L
No. 3 Florida State $	8	–	0	11	–	1
No. 10 North Carolina	6	–	2	10	–	2
Clemson	6	–	2	7	–	5
Virginia	5	–	3	7	–	5
Georgia Tech	4	–	4	5	–	6
Maryland	3	–	5	5	–	6
NC State	3	–	5	3	–	8
Wake Forest	1	–	7	3	–	8
Duke	0	–	8	0	–	11
$ – Conference champion; Rankings from AP Poll

The 1996 Maryland Terrapins football team represented the University of Maryland in the 1996 NCAA Division I-A football season. In their fifth season under head coach Mark Duffner, the Terrapins compiled a 5–6 record, finished in sixth place in the Atlantic Coast Conference, and were outscored by their opponents 239 to 187. The team's statistical leaders included Brian Cummings with 1,127 passing yards, Brian Underwood with 449 rushing yards, and Geroy Simon with 534 receiving yards.

== Schedule ==
Date	Time	Opponent	Site	TV	Result	Attendance	Source
August 31	7:00 p.m.	Northern Illinois*	Byrd Stadium; College Park, MD		W 30–6	32,517	
September 7	7:00 p.m.	UAB*	Byrd Stadium; College Park, MD		W 39–15	30,057	
September 14	12:00 p.m.	at No. 22 Virginia	Scott Stadium; Charlottesville, VA (rivalry)	JPS	L 3–21	39,200	
September 28	6:00 p.m.	No. 23 West Virginia*	Mountaineer Field; Morgantown, WV (rivalry)	ESPN2	L 0–13	54,542	
October 5	12:00 p.m.	NC State	Byrd Stadium; College Park, MD		L 8–34	32,550	
October 12	7:00 p.m.	at No. 13 North Carolina	Kenan Memorial Stadium; Chapel Hill, NC	ESPN2	L 7–38	47,500	
October 19	2:00 p.m.	Wake Forest	Byrd Stadium; College Park, MD		W 52–0	30,212	
October 26	12:00 p.m.	at Duke	Wallace Wade Stadium; Durham, NC	JPS	W 22–19	18,751	
November 2	3:30 p.m.	at Clemson	Memorial Stadium; Clemson, SC	ABC	L 3–35	60,584	
November 14	8:00 p.m.	Georgia Tech	Byrd Stadium; College Park, MD	ESPN	W 13–10	22,510	
November 23	8:00 p.m.	vs. No. 3 Florida State	Pro Player Stadium; Miami Gardens, FL	ABC	L 10–48	31,989	
*Non-conference game; Rankings from AP Poll released prior to the game; All times are in Eastern time

== Roster ==
1996 Maryland Terrapins football team roster
Players
Coaches
Offense

Pos.	#	Name	Class
QB	9	Brian Cummings	Jr
QB	5	Trey Evans	Fr
OT	66	John Feugill	So
TE	97	Craig Fitzgerald	Sr
RB	13	Shawn Forte	Fr

Defense

Pos.	#	Name	Class
S	43	Jason Apolenis	So
S	2	Henry Baker	Jr
LB	44	Eric Barton	So
DB	25	Clifton Crosby	So
DE	90	Eric Hicks	Jr
DE	42	Eric Ogbogu	Jr
LB	32	Kendall Ogle	Jr
DB	12	Chad Scott	Sr
LB	46	Ratcliff Thomas	Sr

Special teams

Pos.	#	Name	Class
K	16	Joe O'Donnell	Sr

Head coach

- Mark Duffner

Coordinators/assistant coaches

Legend

- (C) Team captain
- (S) Suspended
- (I) Ineligible
- Injured
- Redshirt

Roster
