= Ray Poppelman =

American Marine and athlete (1907–2003)

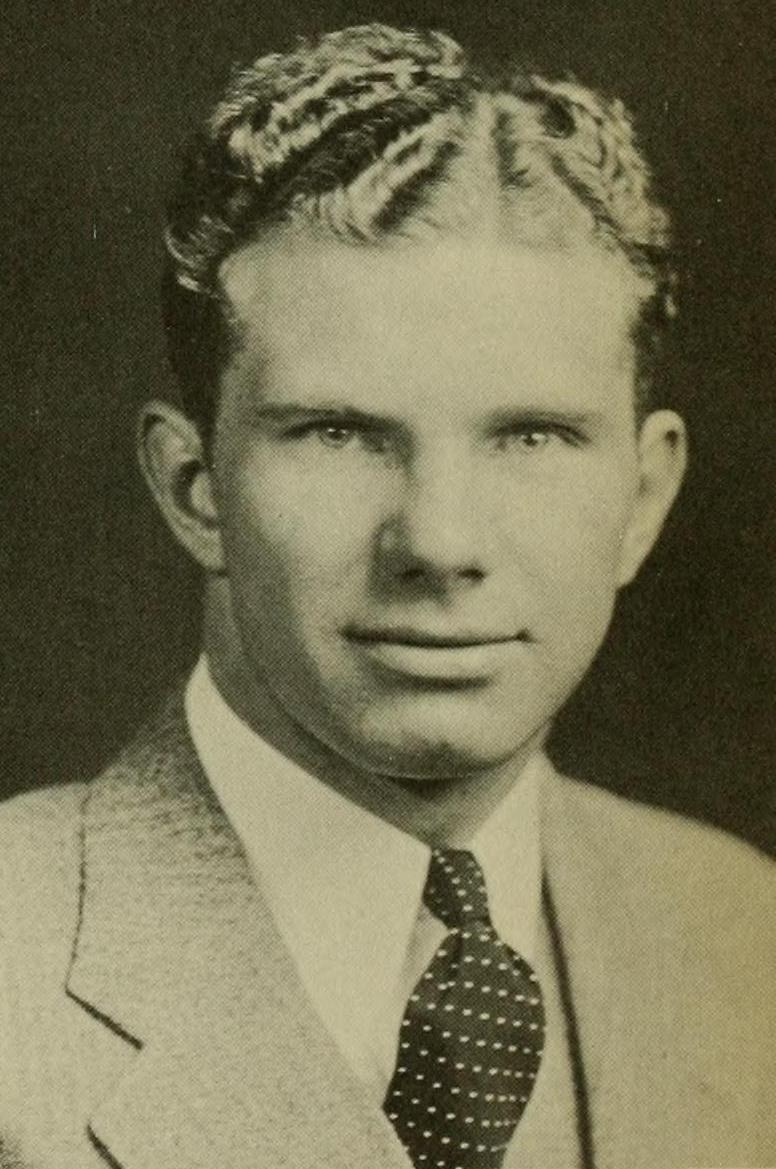
Poppelman at the University of Maryland in 1933

Raymond J. Poppelman (March 6, 1907 – February 28, 2003) was an American Marine and athlete. He attended the University of Maryland, where he played on the football and lacrosse teams. Poppelman was inducted into the University of Maryland Athletic Hall of Fame in 1988.

== Biography ==
A native of San Fernando, California, Poppelman served in the United States Marine Corps as an enlistedman, and was stationed in Shanghai during the 1920s. He played on the football team at Quantico in 1927. The talents of Poppelman and Albert Woods, a Quantico teammate, attracted the attention of Maryland's head coach, Curley Byrd. Byrd dispatched scouts to watch all of Quantico's game, and according to Kings of American Football: The University of Maryland, 1890–1952, the base soon "was referred to as Maryland's 'farm team' and the Southern Conference passed a rule making play with a service team count in eligibility the same as play with another college."

Poppelman at Maryland ahead of the 1932 season.

Poppelman attended the University of Maryland, where he played on the football team from 1930 to 1932 as a quarterback, fullback, and halfback, and on the lacrosse team as an attackman in 1931 and 1932. He also played one season of basketball and competed on the track team. To entice him to attend the school, Byrd arranged for Poppelman, who was dissatisfied with the standard dorm bunks, to receive a special bed. In 1930, Poppelman scored twice in the 41–7 rout of Washington & Lee, and he tallied once in the 13–7 victory over Virginia Tech.

In 1931, Poppelman helped Maryland beat Navy, 6–0, on a double reverse where he pitched the ball to Paul Kiernan, who in turn passed to George Chalmers. Chalmers ran the ball 20 yards to the Midshipmen 30-yard line, which set up the Terrapin score on the following play. Poppelman scored twice himself on rushes against Virginia Tech, which helped the Terrapins to a 20–0 win. The following week, he scored against Vanderbilt in Maryland's only loss of the season, 39–12. Poppelman accounted for both touchdowns against Washington & Lee, 13–7. Maryland secured the state football championship with a defeat, 41–6, of Western Maryland. In that game, Poppelman tallied three times on carries of 31, 50, and 56 yards, "in addition to picking up much yardage on other excursions." Poppelman finished the season with 1,350 rushing yards, which surpassed the previous school record of 1,255 set by Gerald Snyder in 1928. He was named an honorable mention All-American. The Baltimore Sun selected the entire Terrapins backfield, including Poppelman, for its All-Maryland team. It reasoned the unprecedented nature of that selection was due to the "complete dominance of State football by the University of Maryland during 1931" and "the manner in which that team swept aside all opposition in this territory".

In 1932, he was credited with leading Maryland to a 63–0 rout of Washington College. During the season, he struck a freshman player in a scrimmage and was dismissed from the team by Curley Byrd. Byrd reinstated him after Poppelman issued an apology before the game against VMI. Against the Keydets, Poppelman put Maryland ahead to win, 12–7, in the fourth quarter with a 52-yard run. He scored the deciding points against Washington & Lee, 6–0, and tallied once against Johns Hopkins, 23–0.

After the season, he was named to the All-South Atlantic team as a halfback and the team captain by "virute of being the only player to have made the mythical team previously". The selectors called Poppelman a "triple threat ace" and "to Maryland what John Cain was to Alabama. Poppelman was a member of the Sigma Nu fraternity. He graduated from Maryland in 1933 with a Bachelor of Arts degree.

He was inducted into the University of Maryland Athletic Hall of Fame in 1988.

== Published works ==
- More Than Luck: The Memoirs of Raymond J. Poppelman (2002)
