= Kirkland Besley =

American football player and hospital administrator (1902–1994)

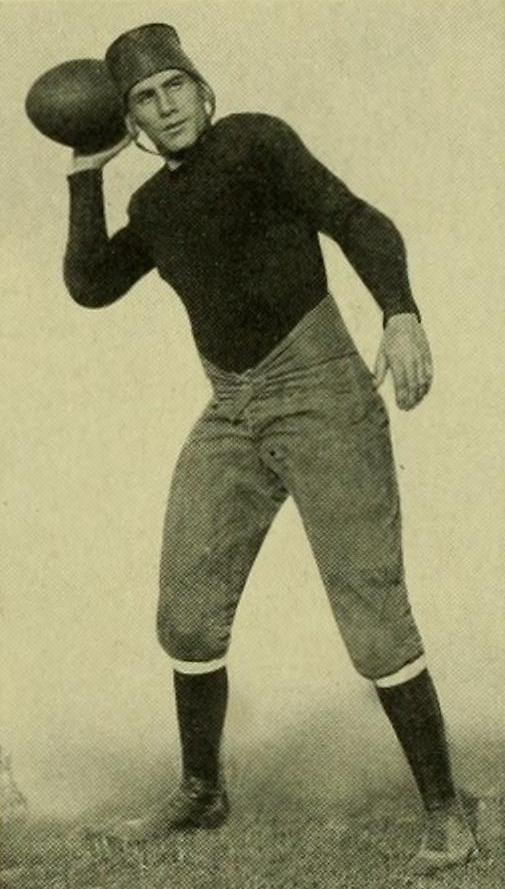
Besley at Maryland in 1924

Arthur Kirkland Besley (November 9, 1902 – September 17, 1994) was an American hospital administrator and college football player. He played as a quarterback and halfback at the University of Maryland.

== Biography ==
He was born to Maryland state forester Frederick Wilson Besley and Bertha née Simonds on November 9, 1902 in Washington, D.C. Besley attended the University of Maryland where he gained his first football experience at any level with the varsity team. He played as a halfback in 1922 and 1925 and as a quarterback in 1923 and 1924. Besley received from Maryland a Bachelor of Science degree in 1923, a Master of Science degree in 1924, and in 1931, a Doctor of Philosophy degree with a dissertation on "The Effect of Ozone on the Vitamin Content of Cod Liver Oil." He was a member of the Beta Kappa chapter of the Kappa Alpha Order .

From 1943 to 1949, Besley served as the superintendent of the Prince George's General Hospital in Cheverly, Maryland. In September 1949, he became the assistant superintendent of the Western Pennsylvania Hospital in Pittsburgh. In 1953, he was appointed as the head of the Norwegian American Hospital in Chicago. On July 22, 1956, Besley witnessed the murder of Margaret Mary Gallagher in Lincoln Park from his apartment through a pair of binoculars, which prompted the media to dub it the "spyglass murder". He flagged down a motorcycle patrolman and directed him to the scene of the crime, but he was unable to identify the murderer because he could not see his face from his vantage point.

== See also ==
- List of Maryland Terrapins quarterbacks
