= Chris Turner (American football) =

American football player (born 1987)

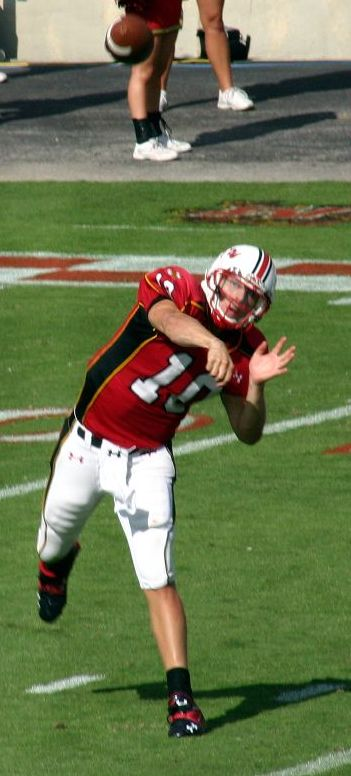
- Turner throwing a pass, October 2007

No. 10
- Position: Quarterback

Personal information
- Born: September 8, 1987 (age 39); Simi Valley, California
- Listed height: 6 ft 4 in (1.93 m)
- Listed weight: 220 lb (100 kg)

Career information
- High school: Chaminade College Preparatory (Los Angeles, California)
- College: Maryland
- NFL draft: 2010: undrafted

Career history
- Georgia Force (2011)*
- * Offseason or practice squad member only

Awards and highlights
- Pontiac Game-Changing Performance (Week 12, 2008)
- Stats at ArenaFan.com

Christopher Evenson Turner (born September 8, 1987) is an American football player. He was a quarterback for the Maryland Terrapins at the University of Maryland from 2007 to 2009. Turner began his career at Maryland as a redshirt in 2005 and then served as a reserve quarterback before he earned the starting position.

After a redshirt season in 2005, Turner saw no playing time as the third-string quarterback the following year. In 2007, he replaced the injured starter during the game against 10th-ranked Rutgers and led the Terrapins to an upset victory. After that, he remained as the team's leader for the remainder of the season, and against eighth-ranked Boston College, engineered another upset victory. Turner also helped Maryland secure an appearance in the Emerald Bowl. At the start of the 2008 season, he was relegated to backup status, but soon regained the starting position. That year, he led Maryland in wins over four of their five ranked opponents and to an appearance in the Humanitarian Bowl. He returned as the starter for the 2009 season, but suffered a knee injury and was replaced by Jamarr Robinson.

== Early life ==
Turner was born in Simi Valley, California to parents John and Grace Turner. His father was the original drummer of the glam metal band Ratt. Chris Turner attended high school at the Chaminade College Preparatory School, where he was a three-year letterwinner and starting quarterback in football and pitcher in baseball. As a sophomore, he was on the junior varsity football team until midseason when the varsity quarterback suffered an injury against Valencia High School, a regional powerhouse. Turner described the incident as the last time that he was nervous during a game and said, "It got pretty ugly to be honest. Ever since then, I've always thought to myself, 'It can't get worse than that.'"

At Chaminade, he led a pass-oriented offense that saw him explode onto the recruiting scene when he eclipsed the 3,000 yard passing mark during his junior year, throwing for 3,391 yards, 30 touchdowns, and 12 interceptions in only 12 games. During his senior year, he led a much more balanced offensive attack when he accumulated 139 completions on 265 attempts, 2,047 yards, 16 touchdowns, and 11 interceptions, while also averaging 8 yards every time he carried the ball. He was named to the All-California Interscholastic Federation (CIF) second team as a senior and the All-Mission League first team as both a junior and senior. SuperPrep picked him as a Far West all-region selection and PrepStar as an all-region selection. Turner was assessed as a Rivals.com three-star and Scout.com two-star recruit. He received scholarship offers from Boise State, Illinois, Louisville, Maryland, Oregon, Utah, and UTEP. Maryland offered him after another Californian recruit, Josh Portis, chose Florida instead—although Portis later transferred to Maryland and served as a backup alongside Turner. Turner ultimately chose Maryland, which is located just outside Washington, D.C., partly due to his interest in politics.

== College career ==
=== Experience ===
Turner sat out his true freshman year during the 2005 season on redshirt status. In 2006, he served as the third-team quarterback behind starter Sam Hollenbach and reserve Jordan Steffy, but Turner saw no playing time during that season.

==== 2007 season ====
In 2007, as the second-string quarterback, he saw his first action against Villanova when he was substituted for injured starter Jordan Steffy. Turner executed a scoring drive and completed four of six passes, but also threw two interceptions. He sat out the next two games and then took one snap against Wake Forest. When the unranked Terps faced 10th-ranked Rutgers, Steffy suffered a concussion and Turner again filled in. He led drives for two touchdowns and two field goals in an upset of the Scarlet Knights, 34–24. About the then relatively unknown Turner, Rutgers head coach Greg Schiano said, "I wish I would have seen this guy before." Turner started for the remaining eight games of the season. In his career-first start, he passed for 255 yards in a win against Georgia Tech, 28–26. In the game, he threw a 78-yard touchdown pass, which was caught by tight end Jason Goode rather than his intended receiver, Darrius Heyward-Bey. After a three-game losing streak, Turner led another upset win over a top-ten team, this time against eighth-ranked Boston College, 42–35. In the 24–16 loss to Florida State, Turner had his worst performance of the season. Late in the second quarter, he was benched and replaced by Steffy for two possessions. Turner said, "I didn't know that my leash was that short in the first place, to be honest. I didn't think it would come to this. I guess I should have." After an uneven performance by Steffy, Turner played the entire second half and showed improvement. The following week Maryland played their regular season finale against NC State and both teams needed an additional win to attain bowl eligibility. Maryland led in the second quarter, 3–0, but was struggling offensively. Turner, a generally immobile pocket quarterback, invigorated the offense when he executed a 41-yard option run for a first down. He completed 19 of 24 passes for 206 yards and led a shutout of NC State, 37–0. With the sixth win, Maryland was invited to the Emerald Bowl, where they were beaten by Oregon State, 21–14. Turner finished the season as the third-most efficient passer in the Atlantic Coast Conference (ACC).

==== 2008 season ====
In 2008, Maryland hired a new offensive coordinator, James Franklin, who installed a West Coast offense. That season started with some controversy when head coach Ralph Friedgen initially selected senior Jordan Steffy as the starting quarterback. Turner considered returning home with a transfer to a Californian school, but ultimately decided against it. When Steffy was injured again in the season-opener against Delaware, Turner was awarded the starting job for the rest of the season. After Maryland defeated 21st-ranked Wake Forest, 26–0, Turner was voted the ACC Player of the Week and ESPN named him an "On the Mark" quarterback. Against 16th-ranked North Carolina, Turner's split-second decision to hold onto the ball for a nine-yard run on fourth down and five put the team within range for the game-winning field goal, 17–15. For that, he was nominated for the week's Pontiac Game Changing Performance. The win improved Maryland's record to 7–3 and reasserted control over their ACC championship destiny, although they lost the next game against Florida State, 37–3, which ended the Terrapins' title hopes. The following week against Boston College, Turner set career highs with 33 completions, 57 attempts, and 360 passing yards, but the effort fell short and Maryland lost, 28–21. In the postseason, the Terrapins played Nevada in the Humanitarian Bowl where Turner threw for 198 yards, one interception, two touchdowns including a 59-yard long, and a two-point conversion. At the end of the season, Maryland had beaten four out of their five Top 25-ranked opponents, a feat that was surpassed only by the teams in the BCS Championship Game: Florida and Oklahoma.

==== 2009 season ====
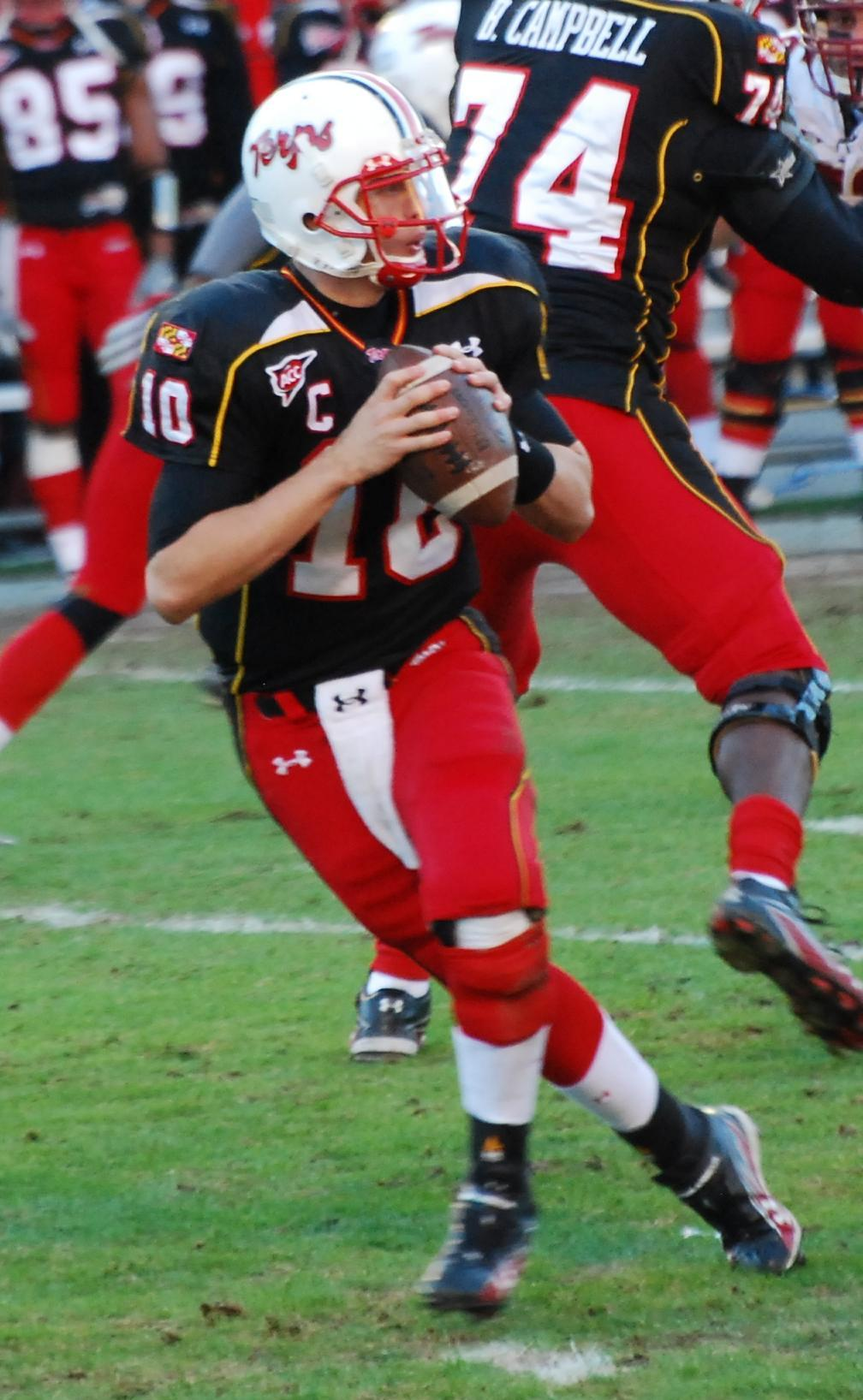
Turner in the pocket against Boston College

Fifth-year senior Turner entered the 2009 season as the uncontested starter at quarterback for the first time in his career. He was backed-up by sophomore Jamarr Robinson and true freshmen C. J. Brown and Danny O'Brien. Turner's seniority was called critical for the performance of the team's relatively youthful offensive line. Head coach Friedgen said, "If I had to choose between a veteran offensive line and an inexperienced quarterback, or an inexperienced line with a veteran quarterback, I think I'd go with the veteran quarterback." Upon the conclusion of preseason camp, the coaching staff praised his progress, particularly his game-planning, for which he had been criticized in the past. Turner said, "Mentally, I am way further ahead than where I was last year." Physically, he dropped 16 pounds by adding muscle and losing body fat, and weighed 220 pounds before the start of the season. Offensive coordinator Franklin said, "You look at him, he was kind of mushy last year. You look at him now and he's muscular and shaped. He looks more athletic."

Before the season, Turner was added to the watch list for the Johnny Unitas Golden Arm Award, an annual honor bestowed upon the nation's top senior quarterback. At that time, he ranked as the school's fourth all-time quarterback in terms of completion percentage, fifth in completions, seventh in total offensive yards, and he is tied for 11th in number of touchdown passes. In June 2009, Turner stated that he wanted to leave a "legacy" at Maryland in his final season. He also expressed a desire to pursue a professional playing career in the National Football League (NFL) if possible.

Pre-draft measurables
Height	Weight	40-yard dash	10-yard split	20-yard split	20-yard shuttle	Three-cone drill	Vertical jump	Broad jump	Bench press
6 ft 3 5/8 in (1.92 m)	212 lb (96 kg)	5.20 s	1.61 s	3.05 s	4.68 s	7.88 s	28.0 in (0.71 m)	8 ft 7 in (2.62 m)	11 reps
All values from Pro Day

The NFL Draft Scout assessed Turner as the 16th-ranked quarterback out of the 135 available for the 2010 NFL draft and projected him as a potential seventh-round selection.

=== Playing style and personality ===
Prior to his senior year, Jeff Barker of The Baltimore Sun noted that Turner's strengths were "poise, smarts, [and] toughness," while he had room for improvement in arm strength and mobility. Barker said, "He's a bit streaky—he calls himself a 'rhythm' passer … But he doesn't quit when things go poorly. His coolness can be mistaken for apathy." Turner typically confines himself to the pocket, as his ability to run the ball himself is limited by his speed. He has made light of his own lack of quickness by saying that he runs a "flat 5.0"-second 40-yard dash. The CBS Sports-affiliated NFL Draft Scout records his actual time as ranging from a low of 4.89 to a high of 5.16 seconds, while Scout.com reports his 40-yard time as 4.8 seconds. Turner's supposedly one-dimensional nature, however, has occasionally allowed him to make unexpected plays with his feet. The most noteworthy of these were the momentum-changing 41-yard option run against NC State in 2007, and the fourth-down nine-yard scramble into field goal range against North Carolina in 2008.

Pundits and coaches sometimes characterized Turner as a quarterback who did not excel during practices, but executed well on game-day. Maryland head coach Ralph Friedgen said "He's pretty go-with-the-flow. And that's his greatest strength and maybe his greatest weakness. The bottom line is, he plays well in games." The Baltimore Sun wrote that he "seems to play his best when it counts—and his worst when it doesn't." Regarding the 2008 summer practices, offensive coordinator James Franklin said Turner ranked in the middle compared with Jordan Steffy and Josh Portis in terms of completion percentage, fewest interceptions, and "explosive" plays that gained 16 yards or more. Turner conceded that Steffy was a better game-planner during practices. Head coach Ralph Friedgen who had offered critical or subdued assessments of Turners' practice, said his intensity grew after losing the starting position to Steffy prior to the 2008 season. Turner said, "It lit a fire in me in the sense that I had to be ready."

Among his Maryland teammates and coaches, Turner earned a reputation as an archetypal "laid-back" Californian and for remaining calm under pressure. After the 2007 win over Rutgers, offensive tackle Scott Burley described his roommate Turner as "real calm [in the huddle] . . . He would say, 'Guys, are you ready to score again? Are you ready to run the ball on these guys?' And we're like, 'Yeah, let's do that.'" Turner received the nicknames "Sunshine" and "Napoleon Dynamite", in reference to his similar appearance to the fictional characters in the films Remember the Titans and Napoleon Dynamite, respectively.

== Personal life ==
Turner graduated from the University of Maryland in May 2009 with a bachelor's degree in government and politics. His strong interest in politics factored into his decision on where to attend college. He chose the University of Maryland partly based on its close proximity to Washington, D.C. Turner's political views are liberal; he is registered as a Democrat, and has described himself as an idealist.

During the 2008 season, political discussions were common in the Maryland locker room because of the presidential election. Turner and fellow quarterback Jordan Steffy, a conservative and supporter of presidential candidate Senator John McCain, were the most frequent debaters, while defensive tackle Dean Muhtadi was described as the primary instigator. During the summer of 2009, Turner held an internship on Capitol Hill working for Democratic Representative Steny Hoyer, the House Majority Leader and Maryland's fifth district congressman. Turner had previously considered volunteering for the presidential campaign of Barack Obama, which he said probably annoyed his conservative father, John Turner. Describing his experience during the internship, Turner said, "It's funny to compare how serious politics is and how serious football is. Depending on who you talk to, they're both pretty big deals . . . There's more to life than football."

Turner's favorite sport, incidentally, is soccer, not football. He is also interested in foreign cultures and expressed regret at being unable to spend a semester abroad because of college football. Turner said that, dependent upon the outcome of his football career, he would like to attend the 2010 World Cup in South Africa. He was able to attend that event and also got to meet his childhood idol David Beckham.

== Statistics ==
Maryland			Passing								Rushing
Season	GP	GS	Rating	Att	Cmp	%	Yds	Lng	TD	Int	Att	Sack	Yds	Lng	TD
2007	11	8	135.50	241	153	63.5	1,958	78	7	7	44	21	−26	41	0
2008	13	12	119.31	374	214	57.2	2,516	80	13	11	43	27	−154	13	1
2009	10	10	121.05	303	180	59.4	2,069	67	10	10	84	25	22	15	2
Totals	34	30	124.15	918	547	59.6	6,544	80	30	28	171	73	−158	41	3
