= Brian Cummings (American football) =

American football player (born 1975)

Maryland Terrapins
- Position: Quarterback

Personal information
- Born: September 1975 (age 51)

Career information
- College: Maryland (1994–1997)

Brian Cummings (born September 1975) is an American former football player. He played college football as a quarterback for the University of Maryland from 1994 to 1997.

== Early life ==
A native of Westchester County, Cummings attended the Iona Preparatory School in New Rochelle, New York. He played as a quarterback on the football team which ran a run and shoot offense. In October 1992, he led the Catholic High School Football League with eight touchdown passes. Maryland quarterback coach Rob Spence, who coached at Iona Prep in the 1980s, said many people told Cummings he was not fit for a Division I quarterback due to his size and height (5 ft, 11 in, 195 pounds). Maryland was the only major college football program to offer Cummings a scholarship. He was selected in the 50th round of the 1993 Major League Baseball draft by the Montreal Expos. His brother, Craig Cummings, played college football at Delaware.

Known better to his friends as "The Commish".

== College career ==
Cummings attended the University of Maryland, and played on the football team, which also employed the run-and-shoot under head coach Mark Duffner. As a freshman in 1994, he was third on the depth chart at quarterback and considered transferring to a small college or focusing on his baseball career. He saw action in six games, but did not attempt a pass. Cummings was responsible for running Maryland's short-yardage offense and he rushed 15 times for 63 yards and four touchdowns. In the spring, Cummings played as a pitcher on the baseball team, which he led in pitching wins. During the summer, he pitched for an All-American Amateur Baseball Association under-20 team, the Maryland Bombers. Cummings became the backup after Kevin Foley lost out on the starting position and transferred to Boston University.

In 1995, he played in seven games and completed 98 of 166 pass attempts for 1,193 yards, five touchdowns, and four interceptions. Before the season, Cummings was named the starter after senior Scott Milanovich received a four-game suspension for gambling. He led the Terrapins to a surprising 4–0 start after the team had been picked to finish seventh in the Atlantic Coast Conference. Cummings was knocked out of the season opener against Tulane with a sprained ankle in the first quarter, and was replaced by Orlando Strozier. Cummings returned to start in a 32–18 upset over North Carolina, and completed ten passes on 18 attempts for 180 yards despite his ankle injury.

Against Duke, he threw for a career-high 299 yards. Wide receiver Jermaine Lewis said, "Brian won the first four games and the team tends to really rally around him... I guess we tend to have a lot of confidence with him in there." Cummings suffered a broken toe on his right foot and bruised shoulder and Milanovich returned to his starting role after his suspension. Cummings saw no action in Maryland's fifth game, a 31–3 loss to Georgia Tech, which knocked the team out of the Top 25 rankings. At Wake Forest, Cummings came off the bench in relief of Milanovich, who had struggled reading the blitz, and played the last 39 minutes. He completed 20 passes on 30 attempts for 222 yards. He led three drives that culminated in a field goal, touchdown, and a final series which used eight minutes of the game clock in the 9–6 victory. After the game, head coach Mark Duffner praised Cummings' play, but stopped shy of naming him the starter. Cummings started against Clemson and Louisville, but the offense struggled and Milanovich started the last three games, while Cummings nursed a sore shoulder. Duffner said of Cummings, "One of our kids said he's a linebacker playing quarterback. On a scramble, when he can slide to get down, he'll try to run over a kid for extra yards. We've still got to get some of that out of him, but you've got to love that toughness." Because he felt his arm needed the rest, Cummings did not play college or amateur baseball in 1996 for the first time since he was ten years old.

In 1996, he played in nine games and completed 92 of 173 attempts for 1,127 yards, seven touchdowns, and nine interceptions. With the graduation of Milanovich, Cummings became the uncontested starter backed up by redshirt freshman Ken Mastrole. Cummings suffered a concussion and separated shoulder when hit by three Virginia defenders. He returned to start at West Virginia with a separated shoulder, but played poorly and reaggravated his injury. Against Wake Forest, Cummings played "a brilliant first half", but suffered another concussion. During halftime, he collapsed in the locker room. He was hospitalized and suffered a 24-hour bout of uncontrollable vomiting. Mastrole served as his replacement for two games until breaking his collarbone against Duke. Keon Russell, a transfer from American International College who intended to switch to receiver, filled in as the quarterback. In the season finale against Florida State, Cummings was knocked down 19 times, including eight sacks, and pulled himself from the game. Maryland finished the season with either zero or one touchdowns in seven of its last nine games, and Duffner was fired with a 20–35 record. He was replaced by Ron Vanderlinden who installed a multiple offense.

In 1997, he played in eleven games and completed 154 of 255 attempts for 1,760 yards, ten touchdowns, and six interceptions. In 1997, Cummings again entered the season atop the depth chart, selected by the new coaching staff over Mastrole because of his greater game experience. Vanderlinden said, "Brian Cummings is good enough for us to win with. Ken Mastrole will be." Wake Forest head coach Jim Caldwell said, "One of my favorite players to watch in the ACC is (Maryland's) Brian Cummings. He is a tough competitor. That first half he almost beat us by himself. He ran around, was elusive and tough to handle." Against Wake, Cummings recorded career-highs in completions (27) and attempts (47).
