= William W. Skinner =

American chemist, conservationist, and college football coach (1874–1953)

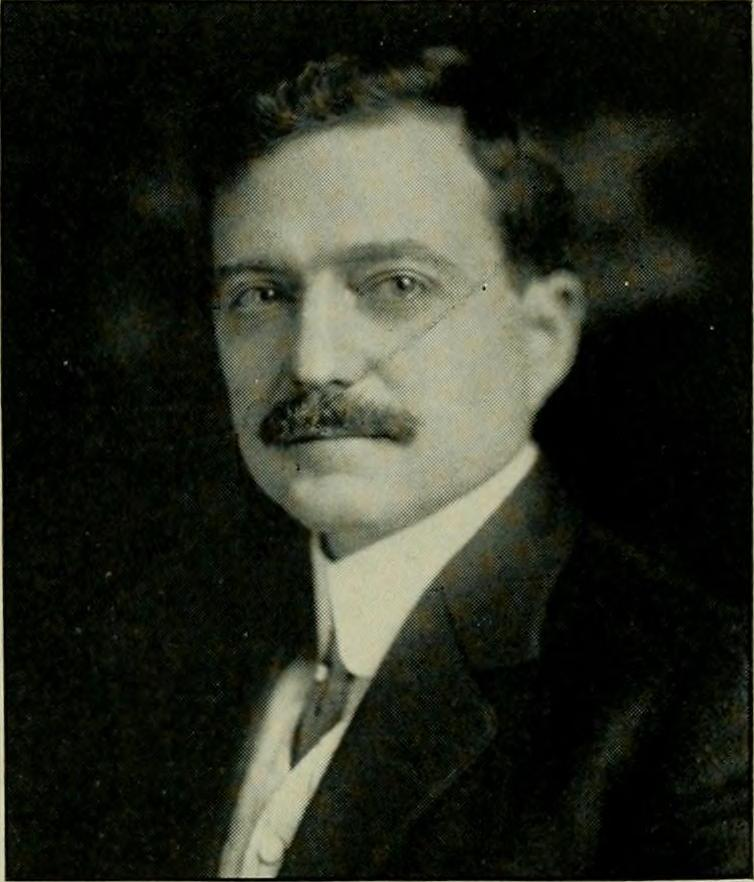
- Skinner as an instructor at Maryland in 1917

Biographical details
- Born: March 28, 1874; Baltimore, Maryland, U.S.
- Died: March 10, 1953 (aged 78); Baltimore, Maryland, U.S.

Playing career
- 1892: Maryland
- Position: Quarterback

Coaching career (HC unless noted)
- 1892: Maryland
- 1900–1901: Arizona

Head coaching record
- Overall: 7–5

William Woolford Skinner (March 28, 1874 – March 10, 1953) was an American chemist, conservationist, and college football coach. He served as the head coach at Maryland Agricultural College—now known as the University of Maryland, College Park—in 1892 and the University of Arizona from 1900 to 1901.

== Early life and college ==
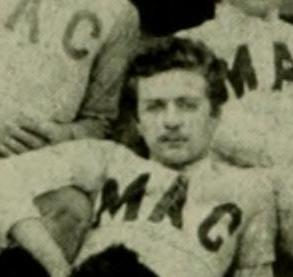
Skinner poses for the team photograph in 1892.

Skinner was born in Baltimore on March 28, 1874, and raised in Cambridge, Maryland. He enrolled at the Maryland Agricultural College in 1891. In 1892, he became the football team's first quarterback and head coach. During that inaugural season, Maryland went scoreless to finish with a 0–3 record. In 1894, he was instrumental in the formation of the Maryland Intercollegiate Football Association, which was created to award the state football championship. In 1895, Skinner graduated from the MAC as the valedictorian. He earned a B.S. through its "Agricultural-Scientific" course.

== Professional career ==
Upon graduation, Skinner took a job at his alma mater as an assistant chemist, and enrolled in graduate school at Columbian University (now the George Washington University) in 1896. He graduated with an M.S. from Columbian in 1898. In 1899, Skinner married Georgia née Mitchell, with whom he later had a daughter. From 1899 to 1901, he served in an assistant chemist post at the University of Arizona. While there, he also studied geology and coached the football team in 1900 and 1901. He guided Arizona to 3–1 and 4–1 records, respectively.

In 1904, Skinner studied botany and physical chemistry at the University of California. That summer, he worked as a chemist at the University of Arizona School of Mines. Following that, he took a job as a food inspection chemist with the Bureau of Chemistry of the United States Department of Agriculture, where he worked until 1908. Skinner then became the chief of the bureau's Water Laboratory. In 1911, the Maryland Agriculture College awarded him an honorary M.S. degree. As of 1914, Skinner was living in Kensington, Maryland and continuing his work as the chief of the Water Laboratory.

The Baltimore Sun described Skinner as "a nationally prominent agricultural chemist and one of the nation's foremost conservationists, who was one of the first researchers to study pollution in the Chesapeake Bay."

Skinner served on the board of regents at the University of Maryland from 1916 to 1941, including as its chairman from 1935 onward.

== Later life ==
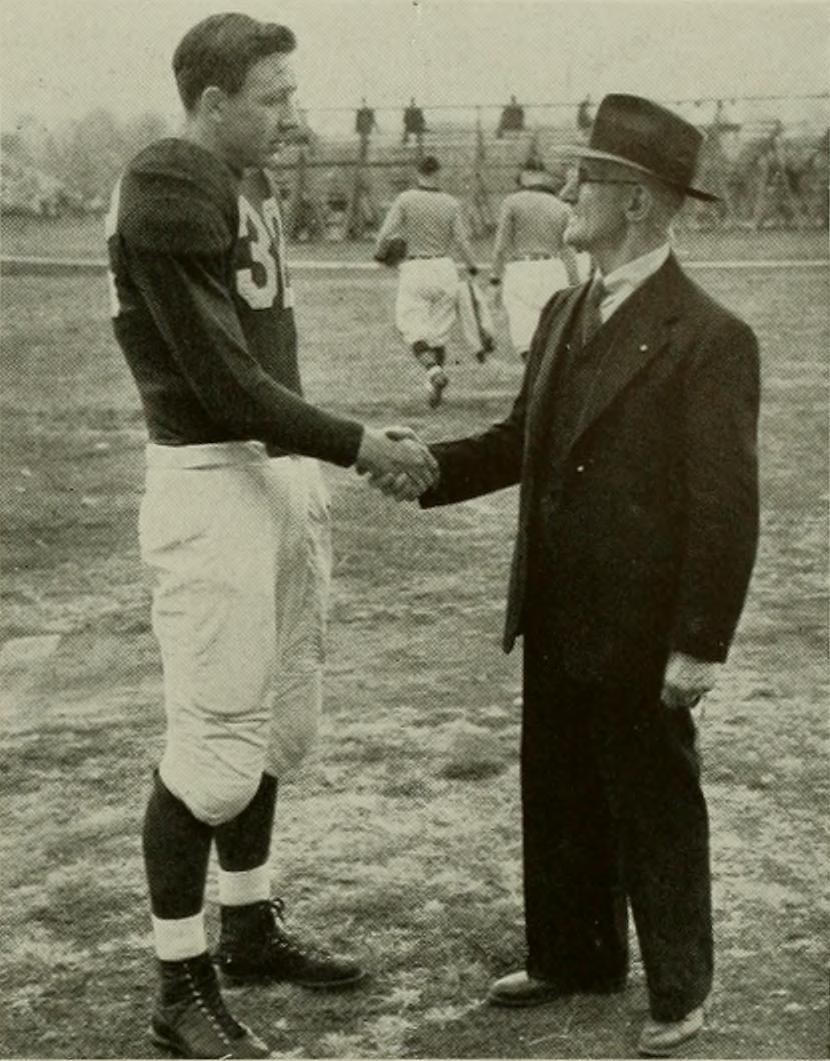
Skinner meets Maryland quarterback Tommy Mont in 1942.

In 1942, while associate chief of the Bureau of Agricultural Chemistry and Engineering, Skinner attended a meeting to discuss food dehydration as a means to reduce the logistical burden of transporting war supplies. The Sheboygan Press noted that he was not called upon during the meeting, and remained quiet until its participants began to disperse. He then spoke up:

I have been a student of dehydration for many years, but I don't suppose that counts. Old fellows like me don't get much attention. The accent is on youth in these times—so much so that I think it wouldn't be out of place to design another flag for the Capitol in addition to Old Glory. Yes, gentlemen, I recommend a background of bright green, with a pair of diapers rampant.

Skinner was promoted to chief of the Bureau in November 1942.

He died on March 10, 1953. Skinner was posthumously inducted into the inaugural class of the University of Maryland Alumni Hall of Fame in 1995. The Skinner Building, constructed on the school's campus in 1915, is named in his honor.

== Head coaching record ==
Year	Team	Overall	Conference	Standing	Bowl/playoffs
Maryland Aggies (Independent) (1892)
1892	Maryland	0–3			
Maryland:		0–3			
Arizona (Independent) (1900–1901)
1900	Arizona	3–1			
1901	Arizona	4–1			
Arizona:		7–2			
Total:		7–5			
