= William W. Evans =

American attorney, Marine Corps officer, and athlete

William W. "Moon" Evans
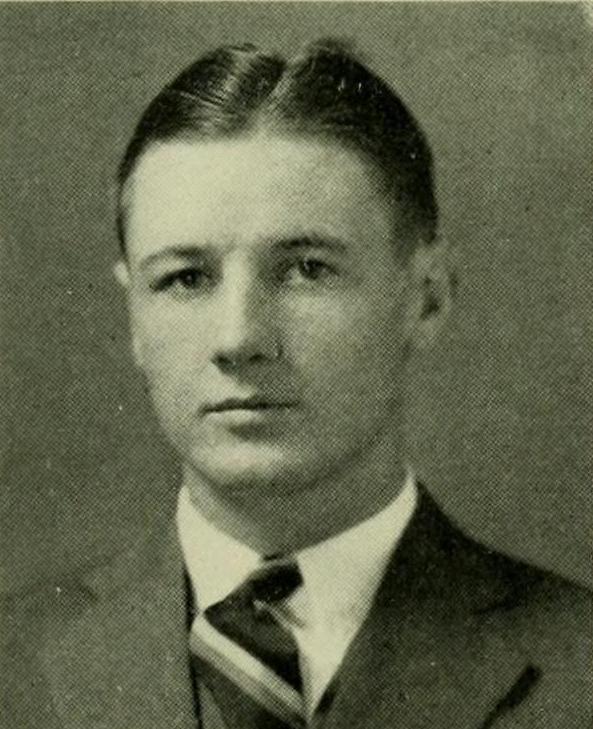
- Evans as a senior at Maryland in 1930
- Born: 1908
- Died: August 18, 1963 (aged 54–55)
- Known for: American attorney, Marine Corps officer, and athlete

William W. "Moon" Evans (c. 1908 – August 18, 1963) was an American attorney, Marine Corps officer, and athlete. He played college football, basketball, and lacrosse at the University of Maryland. In lacrosse, Evans led the nation in scoring in 1929 and 1930. He was inducted into the National Lacrosse Hall of Fame in 1966 and the University of Maryland Athletic Hall of Fame in 1983.

== College career ==
Evans was a native of Chevy Chase, Maryland. He attended the Business High School in Washington, D.C., and graduated in 1926. He went on to college at the University of Maryland. In football, Evans received a freshman letter in 1927, and varsity letters in 1928, 1929, and 1930. He was a quarterback in Curley Byrd's pass-oriented version of the double-wing formation. In 1929, Evans was one of "the heroes of Maryland's dramatic finish" in which it tied a heavily favored 1929 Yale Bulldogs football team, 13–13. An "intricate triple pass" from Evans to Shorty Chalmers to Boze Berger scored the game's final points in the closing minutes to ensure the stalemate.

Evans also starred on the Maryland Terrapins men's lacrosse team. He received a freshman letter in 1927, and varsity letters in 1928, 1929, 1930. He served as the team captain in 1930. In 1929, Evans scored 37 goals, which made him the nation's leading scorer, and he earned that title again the following year. He was named to the United States Intercollegiate Lacrosse Association All-America first team at the "in home" position in 1929, and the "out home" position in 1930. According to his National Lacrosse Hall of Fame biography, Evans was considered the best all-around lacrosse player of his time and the best player of the decade. In basketball, Evans received a freshman letter in 1927, and varsity letters in 1928, 1929, 1930. He was the team captain during the 1929–1930 season.

Evans was a member of the Omicron Delta Kappa honor society and the Kappa Alpha Order. He graduated from Maryland in 1930 with a Bachelor of Arts degree, and was voted the "Best Senior Athlete", finishing ahead of Julius J. Radice and Albert Heagy. Evans continued his postgraduate studies at the school in 1931.

== Professional career ==
In 1932, Evans played box lacrosse for the Baltimore club in the Box Lacrosse League, and led his team to an undefeated record as its highest scorer. He finished his graduate studies at the George Washington University Law School, from which he received a Bachelor of Laws degree in 1934. In 1935, he began practicing law in Rockville, Maryland. In 1942, Evans enlisted in the United States Marine Corps and fought in the Battle of Peleliu and Battle of Okinawa. After the war, he resigned from the military with the rank of captain, and returned to practicing law in Montgomery County, Maryland, until his death in 1963.

== Death ==
Evans died on August 18, 1963, at his home in Norbeck, Maryland. He was inducted into the Maryland Athletic Hall of Fame in 1961. Evans was posthumously inducted into the National Lacrosse Hall of Fame in 1966, and into the University of Maryland Athletic Hall of Fame in 1983.
