= Maryland–Virginia football rivalry =

American college football rivalry

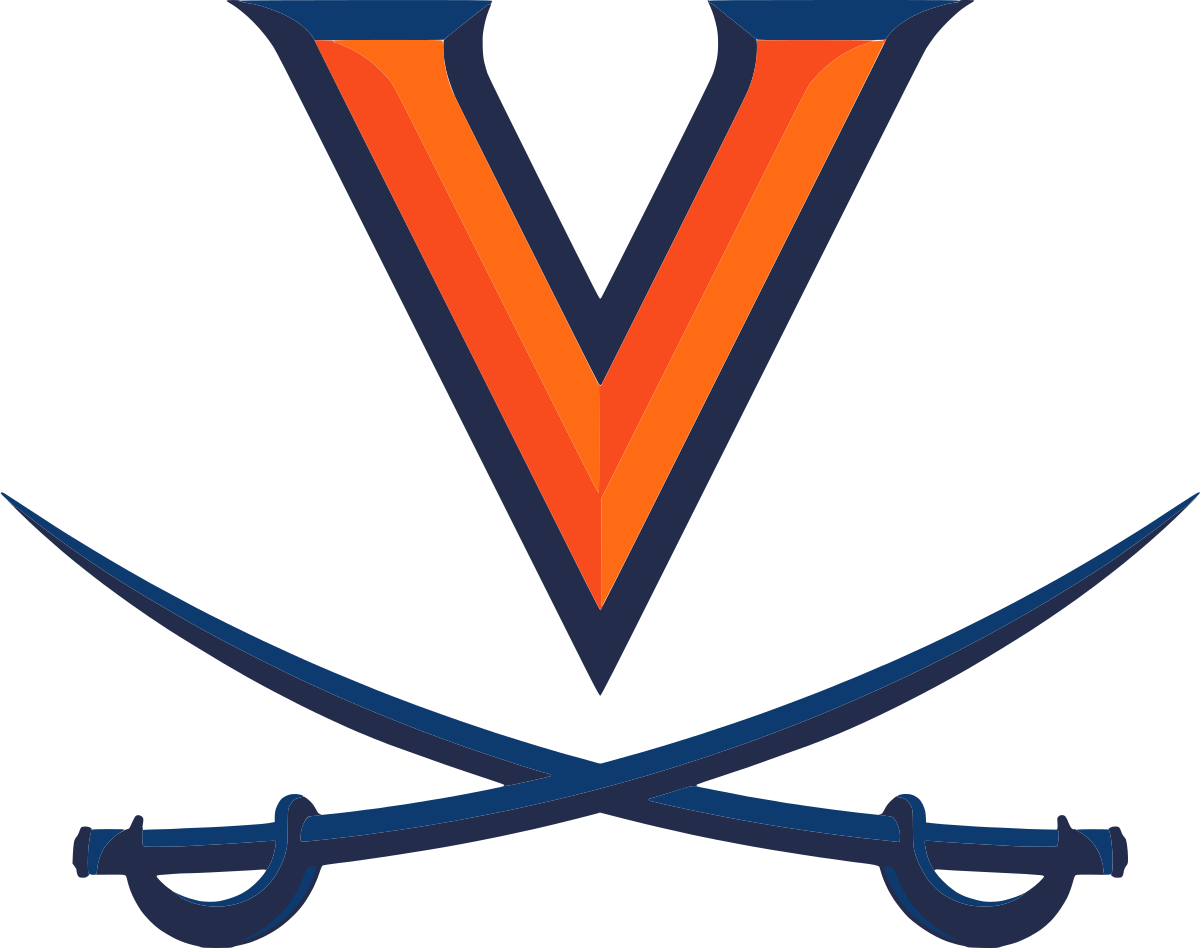
- Maryland Terrapins Virginia Cavaliers
- First meeting: October 11, 1919; Maryland, 13–0
- Latest meeting: September 14, 2024; Maryland, 27–13
- Next meeting: TBD
- Trophy: Tydings Trophy (1920s–1945)

Statistics
- Total meetings: 80
- All-time series: Maryland leads, 46–32–2
- Largest victory: Maryland: 55–12 (1959); Virginia: 45–0 (1997)
- Longest win streak: Maryland, 16 (1972–1987)
- Current win streak: Maryland, 4 (2012–present)

Locations of Maryland and Virginia

The Maryland–Virginia football rivalry is an American college football rivalry between the Maryland Terrapins and Virginia Cavaliers. The Terrapins and Cavaliers first met in 1919 and the series was played annually from 1957 through 2013, before Maryland left the Atlantic Coast Conference (ACC) for the Big Ten Conference in 2014.

Maryland leads the series 46–32–2, although Virginia is 15–9 since 1991. Maryland possesses the longest winning streak of the series, sixteen games between 1972 and 1987, while Virginia has the second longest streak with nine consecutive wins ending in 2000.

The schools jointly announced a home-home series in 2017 that would be played during the 2023 and 2024 seasons.

== Background ==
=== Contributing factors ===
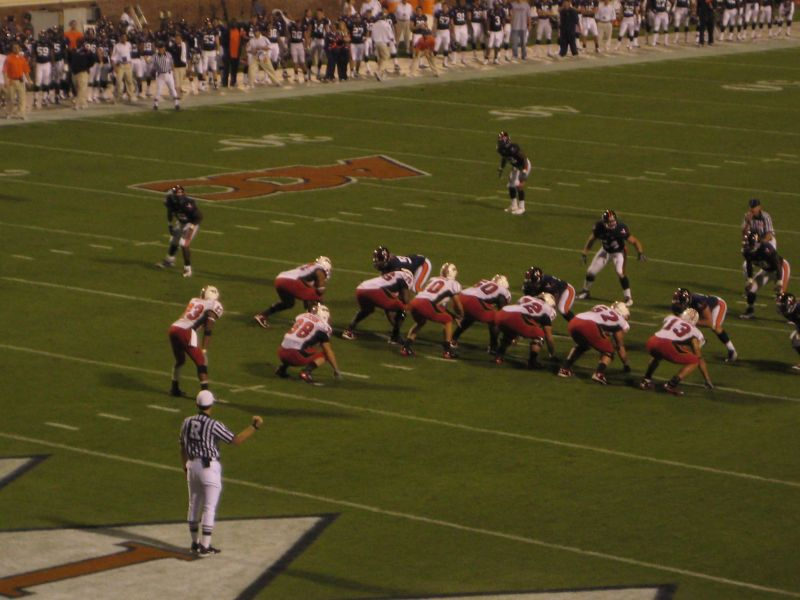
Maryland lines up against Virginia in Charlottesville in 2008. Maryland was held scoreless in the game, losing 31–0.

Several factors contribute to the intensity of the rivalry. The two states, and their eponymous flagship universities based in Charlottesville, Virginia and College Park, Maryland, respectively, share close historical and cultural ties. The schools are located in relatively close geographic proximity, separated by about 129 miles (208 km). Due in large part to this proximity, the schools aggressively compete for recruits in the Mid-Atlantic region. Former Maryland coach Ralph Friedgen expressed the importance of the rivalry by stating, "It's a potential rivalry in every sport we play. They're border states. We compete for students, not just athletes."

The two are both long-time members of the Atlantic Coast Conference, with Maryland becoming a founding member in 1953 and Virginia joining later in that same year. When the conference reorganized in 2005, Maryland and Virginia were placed in separate divisions, but designated as cross-divisional rivals that continue to meet annually. The intensity of the rivalry is increased by a long history in the series of comebacks, shutouts, and spoilers that prevented one team from securing a conference championship or bowl game appearance. From the 1920s until 1945, the teams competed for the Tydings Trophy, named for former politician and Maryland alum Millard Tydings who had several friends amongst the professors at Virginia. In 2003, the schools discussed reviving the trophy tradition, but it was ultimately rejected by Virginia, due to concerns over the reorganization of the ACC.

Before and after their meeting in 2010, players from both schools attributed the importance of the game to the negative feelings the programs have for each other. Virginia center Anthony Mihota said "I guess it's because we don't like them very much. Something about them that gets under our skin". After Maryland's victory, Terp linebacker Adrian Moten commented, "This was a big win in the rivalry. They hate us. We hate them."

The high academic standing of the University of Virginia in a national publication has added to the competitiveness between the two. In 2003, University of Maryland president C.D. Mote asserted that, in academic terms, Virginia was "highly overrated these days ... U.S. News & World Report places them at the top of the pile with Berkeley, which is ridiculous." Mote further stated that students from the state of Maryland paying a higher tuition cost to attend the University of Virginia "don't know any better." While the University of Virginia president, John Casteen, said such remarks can be taken out of context, Virginia board of visitors member, William H. Goodwin, responded in The Cavalier Daily, "I certainly think a college president should have more class, but you have to expect that from Maryland."

=== Relative importance ===
Former Virginia head coach Al Groh stopped short of calling the game with Maryland a 'rivalry', but said that "it is a very important game to our team and it is our annual game. So that certainly designates it as being different from the other games." Maryland head coach Ralph Friedgen conceded that "[Virginia has] Virginia Tech as an in-state rivalry, but I think we're their out-of-state rivalry."

Maryland–Virginia is the second most played out-of-state rivalry for Virginia, after the longest standing rivalry in the ACC, the South's Oldest Rivalry between Virginia and North Carolina. It is the fourth most played for the Cavaliers overall, after North Carolina, Virginia Tech (Commonwealth Cup), and Virginia Military Institute. In contrast, Maryland–Virginia is the most-played historical series for Maryland.

== Noteworthy games ==
=== 1945 ===
Maryland 19, Virginia 13

In 1945, the two teams met for a neutral site match-up at Griffith Stadium in Washington, D.C. Head coach Frank Murray, a future Hall of Fame inductee, had led 13th-ranked Virginia to a perfect 7–0 record. The Cavaliers also held an undefeated streak of fourteen games. Bear Bryant was in his only year as Maryland's head coach. Maryland's Sam Behr broke away for a 90-yard touchdown run, but Virginia held the lead in the fourth quarter. In the final seconds of play, Terrapin freshman tailback Bill "Red" Poling completed a forward pass to end Don Gleasner for a 50-yard score. With the win, Maryland tied the all-time series record. The 19–13 loss to Maryland ended Virginia's perfect season and they fell to 20th place in the AP Poll. After this game, the series went on hiatus for 11 years, and it was the last year the Tydings Trophy was awarded.

=== 1961 ===
Virginia 28, Maryland 16

Tom Nugent's Terps entered their last season game boasting a 7–2 record that included a win over seventh-ranked Syracuse with Heisman Trophy-winner Ernie Davis and the only victory over Penn State until 2014. They faced a Virginia team that started off their season by breaking a three-year, 28-game losing streak against William & Mary. The Cavaliers had lost the last three meetings against Maryland by an average of 38 points. With a win against Virginia, the Terps would secure the ACC title and a trip to the Gator Bowl. After Maryland scored for an early lead, Virginia quarterback Gary Cuozzo tossed three short touchdown passes to third-string receiver John Hepler. Defensive back Ted Rzempoluch returned an interception 95 yards for a touchdown, and sealed the Terps' fate to go bowl-less. The other three-loss team in the ACC, Duke, won the conference.

=== 1988 ===
Virginia 24, Maryland 23

In the final minutes of the game, with the Terps trailing the Cavaliers 24–17, Maryland quarterback Neil O'Donnell was injured and taken out of the game. He was replaced by a young second-stringer Scott Zolak. Zolak led a drive which culminated with a three-yard option run for a touchdown narrowing the deficit to a point. With 1:09 left in the game, Maryland went for two. Zolak threw into the endzone to running back Ricky Johnson. Johnson appeared to catch the ball before being hit by defensive back Keith McMeans, knocking the ball loose. An official in the endzone immediately signaled for a catch, before others waved it as incomplete. After the game, the usually level-headed Terps head coach Joe Krivak ran to the official who made the initial call, following him to the locker room, and then ran over to yell at referee Don Safrit. Several witnesses claim he said to the officials that "If it takes every ounce of energy, I'm going to get you out of this league." Virginia (7–4) broke their 16-game losing streak in the series and finished second in the conference. Maryland (5–6) failed to achieve a winning season for the third consecutive year. However, the Cavaliers failed to secure a bowl game berth, while N.C. State with a worse record went on to the Peach Bowl.

=== 1990 ===
Maryland 35, Virginia 30

Besieged Maryland head coach Joe Krivak, with a 17–25 record, led his Terps (5–5) to a sold-out Scott Stadium in Charlottesville for their final regular season game. George Welsh's eighth-ranked Virginia (8–1) had spent three weeks atop the AP poll at number-one until a loss against Georgia Tech. At halftime, Maryland trailed 21–7. Then freshman reserve running back Mark Mason put the Terps back in the game with a 59-yard touchdown breakaway, and a team best run for the year. Maryland quarterback Scott Zolak threw for two more touchdowns and Mason scored the go-ahead with an 8-yard rush to put the Terps ahead 35–30. With the win, Maryland secured a bowl berth for the first time since Bobby Ross left four seasons prior. Virginia took a nose-dive in the AP rankings to 17th, and after another loss to Virginia Tech settled for the Sugar Bowl where they were edged by Tennessee, 23–22.

=== 1999 ===
Virginia 34, Maryland 30

After starting 5–2, Maryland suffered a three-game losing streak before their finale at Byrd Stadium. Maryland needed to beat Virginia to finish with a winning season and likely secure a berth in the Aloha Bowl or Oahu Bowl. At the end of the first quarter, Virginia led 17–0. Maryland's freshman quarterback Latrez Harrison was pulled and replaced by former safety Randall Jones. Jones along with Heisman prospect running back LaMont Jordan led the Terps to tie it at 17 before halftime. In the third quarter, Jordan ran 90 yards to make it 24–17, but the Cavaliers tied it soon after. With 5:18 left, Terps kicker Brian Kopka made a field goal to make it 30–27. In the next series, Virginia went for it on fourth down but a Dan Ellis pass was incomplete. The Terps took over on downs with 1:40 left. Victory seemed assured, but Maryland failed to convert a first down and the inexperienced Randall Jones ran out of bounds on third down, which stopped the clock when Virginia had no time-outs. The Cavaliers got the ball on their own 24-yard line. In nine plays and just 46 seconds, Dan Ellis led a 76-yard drive that culminated with a touchdown pass to Billy McMullen to win the game with 26 seconds left. The 34–30 loss dashed the Terrapins' hopes for their first bowl game since 1990. After the game, Maryland coach Ron Vanderlinden remarked "Devastating. The worst loss I've ever been associated with because of what was on the line."

=== 2002 ===
Virginia 48, Maryland 13

After Terps head coach Ralph Friedgen stated Maryland expected to "beat teams like Duke and Virginia", the Cavs sought vindication for the comparison to ACC football's perpetual underdog. While Maryland's Scott McBrien passed for a touchdown in the first series, Virginia went on to score 20 unanswered points in the second quarter with two Matt Schaub passes and two field goals. In the second half, the Cavaliers delivered four more touchdowns: another Schaub pass, a pass by receiver Billy McMullen, and two short rushing scores. The Terps only managed to use Nick Novak to make two field goals. The loss broke Maryland's eight-game winning streak, and prevented them from sharing a piece of the ACC championship. Instead, Florida State finished with a better conference record (7–1), and secured the title outright.

=== 2003 ===
Maryland 27, Virginia 17

With leading rusher Bruce Perry out due to a sprained ankle, Terps running back Josh Allen adeptly filled in, and racked up 257 yards and two touchdowns. Virginia quarterback Matt Schaub threw for a touchdown and ran for another, but his second-half comeback attempt ultimately fell short. In the game, Schaub overtook Shawn Moore's career passing record at the school. There was also some excitement even before the game started. Maryland assistant coach James Franklin and Virginia head coach Al Groh had a heated exchange after a Cavaliers player interrupted the Terps' warm up drills. Then, after Virginia won the coin toss, Al Groh infamously elected to kick off to start both halves. Immediately after the decision, the entire Maryland team rushed the field in celebration and was given a 15-yard unsportsmanlike conduct penalty before the opening kickoff. The win kept the Terps' ACC title hopes alive, but Florida State narrowly beat N.C. State 50–44 to win the conference outright. Maryland finished second-place in the ACC.

=== 2006 ===
Maryland 28, Virginia 26

After giving up 255 yards, the Terps trailed 20–0 at halftime. Cavaliers punt returner Emmanuel Byers muffed a third-quarter punt to give Maryland possession on the Virginia one-yard line. Lance Ball rushed for a touchdown on the next play, and the Terps went on to score another 21 points in the final quarter to include a 56-yard breakaway by Keon Lattimore and a 45-yard pick-six by linebacker Erin Henderson. With 2:37 left on the clock, the Cavaliers responded with a 44-yard touchdown pass to Kevin Ogletree, to pull to 28–26. Virginia attempted a two-point conversion to send the game into overtime. Cornerback Josh Wilson, who was scored on twice earlier, broke up the pass to clinch the win for the Terps.

=== 2007 ===
Virginia 18, Maryland 17

Reserve sophomore running back Mikell Simpson racked up 119 yards rushing and two touchdowns to go along with 152 receiving yards, for 271 all-purpose yards, as 19th-ranked Virginia came from behind to defeat Maryland. The game ended when, with 16 seconds left, Simpson dived into the endzone as the ball was knocked out of his hands. It was ruled a touchdown and Virginia defeated Maryland. Terps coach Ralph Friedgen said "I saw the ball come out on the goal line. I saw it and I don't think he had possession." Simpson himself stated, "It crossed the line. I knew I scored because I looked down and saw the yellow line and I saw the ball cross [before] they hit it out." With the victory, the Cavaliers reached seven consecutive wins for the first time since 1990 and for only the fourth time in school history. They also accomplished the feat in 1914 and 1949. That season, Virginia won an NCAA record of five games by two points or less, with the other edged teams being North Carolina, Middle Tennessee State, Connecticut, and Wake Forest.

== Game results ==
Maryland victories	Virginia victories	Tie games

No.	Date	Location	Winner	Score
1	October 11, 1919	Charlottesville, VA	Maryland	13–0
2	October 24, 1925	Charlottesville, VA	Virginia	6–0
3	November 13, 1926	College Park, MD	Tie	6–6
4	November 12, 1927	Charlottesville, VA	Virginia	21–0
5	November 17, 1928	College Park, MD	Maryland	18–2
6	November 2, 1929	College Park, MD	Tie	13–13
7	November 1, 1930	Charlottesville, VA	Maryland	14–6
8	October 3, 1931	College Park, MD	Maryland	7–6
9	October 1, 1932	Charlottesville, VA	Virginia	7–6
10	November 4, 1933	Charlottesville, VA	Virginia	6–0
11	November 3, 1934	College Park, MD	Maryland	20–0
12	November 2, 1935	Charlottesville, VA	Maryland	14–7
13	October 17, 1936	Charlottesville, VA	Maryland	21–0
14	October 16, 1937	Charlottesville, VA	Maryland	3–0
15	October 22, 1938	College Park, MD	Virginia	27–19
16	October 14, 1939	Charlottesville, VA	Virginia	12–7
17	October 12, 1940	College Park, MD	Virginia	19–6
18	November 14, 1942	Charlottesville, VA	Maryland	27–12
19	November 6, 1943	Charlottesville, VA	Virginia	39–0
20	November 4, 1944	Washington, D.C.	Virginia	18–7
21	November 24, 1945	Washington, D.C.	Maryland	19–13
22	November 23, 1957	College Park, MD	Maryland	12–0
23	November 22, 1958	Charlottesville, VA	Maryland	44–6
24	November 21, 1959	College Park, MD	Maryland	55–12
25	November 19, 1960	Charlottesville, VA	Maryland	44–12
26	November 25, 1961	Charlottesville, VA	Virginia	28–16
27	November 24, 1962	College Park, MD	Maryland	40–18
28	November 23, 1963	College Park, MD	Maryland	21–6
29	November 21, 1964	Charlottesville, VA	Maryland	10–0
30	November 20, 1965	College Park, MD	Virginia	33–27
31	November 19, 1966	Charlottesville, VA	Virginia	41–17
32	November 25, 1967	College Park, MD	Virginia	12–7
33	November 23, 1968	Charlottesville, VA	Virginia	28–23
34	November 22, 1969	College Park, MD	Maryland	17–14
35	November 21, 1970	Charlottesville, VA	Maryland	17–14
36	November 20, 1971	College Park, MD	Virginia	29–27
37	October 28, 1972	Charlottesville, VA	Maryland	24–23
38	November 10, 1973	College Park, MD	Maryland	33–0
39	November 23, 1974	Charlottesville, VA	Maryland	10–0
40	November 22, 1975	College Park, MD	Maryland	62–24
41	November 20, 1976	Charlottesville, VA	Maryland	28–0

No.	Date	Location	Winner	Score
42	November 19, 1977	College Park, MD	Maryland	28–0
43	November 11, 1978	Charlottesville, VA	Maryland	17–7
44	November 24, 1979	College Park, MD	Maryland	17–7
45	November 22, 1980	Charlottesville, VA	Maryland	31–0
46	November 21, 1981	College Park, MD	Maryland	48–7
47	November 20, 1982	Charlottesville, VA	Maryland	45–14
48	October 1, 1983	College Park, MD	Maryland	23–3
49	November 24, 1984	Charlottesville, VA	Maryland	45–34
50	November 29, 1985	College Park, MD	Maryland	33–21
51	November 28, 1986	Charlottesville, VA	Maryland	42–10
52	September 12, 1987	College Park, MD	Maryland	21–19
53	November 19, 1988	Charlottesville, VA	Virginia	24–23
54	November 18, 1989	College Park, MD	No. 16 Virginia	48–21
55	November 17, 1990	Charlottesville, VA	Maryland	35–30
56	September 7, 1991	College Park, MD	Maryland	17–6
57	September 5, 1992	Charlottesville, VA	No. 25 Virginia	28–15
58	September 4, 1993	College Park, MD	Virginia	43–29
59	November 12, 1994	Charlottesville, VA	No. 21 Virginia	46–21
60	November 11, 1995	College Park, MD	No. 14 Virginia	21–18
61	September 14, 1996	Charlottesville, VA	No. 22 Virginia	21–3
62	November 1, 1997	College Park, MD	Virginia	45–0
63	September 12, 1998	Charlottesville, VA	No. 12 Virginia	31–19
64	November 20, 1999	College Park, MD	Virginia	34–30
65	October 7, 2000	Charlottesville, VA	Virginia	31–23
66	October 6, 2001	College Park, MD	No. 25 Maryland	41–21
67	November 23, 2002	Charlottesville, VA	Virginia	48–13
68	November 13, 2003	College Park, MD	No. 24 Maryland	27–17
69	November 6, 2004	Charlottesville, VA	No. 12 Virginia	16–0
70	October 1, 2005	College Park, MD	Maryland	45–33
71	October 14, 2006	Charlottesville, VA	Maryland	28–26
72	October 20, 2007	College Park, MD	No. 24 Virginia	18–17
73	October 4, 2008	Charlottesville, VA	Virginia	31–0
74	October 17, 2009	College Park, MD	Virginia	20–9
75	November 14, 2010	Charlottesville, VA	Maryland	42–23
76	November 5, 2011	College Park, MD	Virginia	31–13
77	October 13, 2012	Charlottesville, VA	Maryland	27–20
78	October 12, 2013	College Park, MD	Maryland	27–26
79	September 15, 2023	College Park, MD	Maryland	42–14
80	September 14, 2024	Charlottesville, VA	Maryland	27–13
Series: Maryland leads 46–32–2

== See also ==
- List of NCAA college football rivalry games
- Maryland–Virginia lacrosse rivalry
- Maryland–Virginia men's soccer rivalry
