= 1996 Virginia Cavaliers football team =

American college football season

1996 Virginia Cavaliers football

Carquest Bowl, L 21–31 vs. Miami (FL)
- Conference: Atlantic Coast Conference
- Record: 7–5 (5–3 ACC)
- Head coach: George Welsh (15th season)
- Offensive coordinator: Tom O'Brien (6th season)
- Defensive coordinator: Rick Lantz (6th season)
- Captains: Tiki Barber; Todd White
- Home stadium: Scott Stadium

1996 Atlantic Coast Conference football standings
	Conf.			Overall
Team	W		L	W		L
No. 3 Florida State $	8	–	0	11	–	1
No. 10 North Carolina	6	–	2	10	–	2
Clemson	6	–	2	7	–	5
Virginia	5	–	3	7	–	5
Georgia Tech	4	–	4	5	–	6
Maryland	3	–	5	5	–	6
NC State	3	–	5	3	–	8
Wake Forest	1	–	7	3	–	8
Duke	0	–	8	0	–	11
$ – Conference champion; Rankings from AP Poll

The 1996 Virginia Cavaliers football team represented the University of Virginia as a member of the Atlantic Coast Conference (ACC) during the 1996 NCAA Division I-A football season. Led by 15th-year head coach George Welsh, the Cavaliers compiled an overall record of 7–5 with a mark of 5–3 in conference play, placing fourth in the ACC. Virginia was invited to the Carquest Bowl, where the Cavaliers were defeated by the Miami Hurricanes. The team played home games at Scott Stadium in Charlottesville, Virginia.

== Schedule ==
Date	Time	Opponent	Rank	Site	TV	Result	Attendance	Source
September 7	7:00 pm	Central Michigan*	No. 23	Scott Stadium; Charlottesville, VA		W 55–21	41,300	
September 14	12:00 pm	Maryland	No. 22	Scott Stadium; Charlottesville, VA (rivalry)	JPS	W 21–3	39,200	
September 21	12:00 pm	at Wake Forest	No. 20	Groves Stadium; Winston-Salem, NC	JPS	W 42–7	23,220	
September 28	7:30 pm	No. 13 Texas*^{†}	No. 19	Scott Stadium; Charlottesville, VA	ESPN	W 37–13	45,200	
October 5	3:30 pm	at Georgia Tech	No. 12	Bobby Dodd Stadium; Atlanta, GA	ABC	L 7–13	44,900	
October 19	12:00 pm	NC State	No. 20	Scott Stadium; Charlottesville, VA	JPS	W 62–14	40,300	
October 26	3:30 pm	at No. 3 Florida State	No. 14	Doak Campbell Stadium; Tallahassee, FL (Jefferson–Eppes Trophy)	ABC	L 24–31	80,237	
November 2	1:30 pm	at Duke	No. 16	Wallace Wade Stadium; Durham, NC		W 27–3	28,276	
November 9	3:30 pm	Clemson	No. 15	Scott Stadium; Charlottesville, VA	ABC	L 16–24	39,100	
November 16	3:30 pm	No. 6 North Carolina	No. 24	Scott Stadium; Charlottesville, VA (South's Oldest Rivalry)	ABC	W 20–17	42,500	
November 29	2:30 pm	at No. 17 Virginia Tech*	No. 20	Lane Stadium; Blacksburg, VA (rivalry)	CBS	L 9–26	50,290	
December 27	7:30 pm	vs. No. 19 Miami (FL)*		Pro Player Stadium; Miami Gardens, FL (Carquest Bowl)	TBS	L 21–31	46,418	
*Non-conference game; ^{†}Homecoming; Rankings from AP Poll released prior to the game; All times are in Eastern time

== Roster ==
1996 Virginia Cavaliers football team roster
Players
Coaches
Offense

Pos.	#	Name	Class
RB	21	Tiki Barber	Sr
G	63	Trevor Britton	Jr
QB	11	Aaron Brooks	So
WR	17	Germane Crowell	Jr
RB, WR	28	Terrence Wilkins	So

Defense

Pos.	#	Name	Class
DT	85	Maurice Anderson	Fr
DE	94	Duane Ashman	Sr
DB	19	Ronde Barber	Jr
LB	42	James Farrior	Sr
DE	98	Jon Harris	Sr
DE	58	Patrick Kerney	So
LB	44	Wali Rainer	So
LB	33	Jamie Sharper	Sr
LB	9	Shannon Taylor	Fr

Special teams

Pos.	#	Name	Class

Head coach

- George Welsh

Coordinators/assistant coaches

Legend

- (C) Team captain
- (S) Suspended
- (I) Ineligible
- Injured
- Redshirt

Roster
