= Ken Mastrole =

American football player and coach (born 1977)

Profile
- Position: Quarterback

Personal information
- Born: February 25, 1977 (age 49); Fort Lauderdale, Florida, U.S.
- Listed height: 6 ft 3 in (1.91 m)
- Listed weight: 245 lb (111 kg)

Career information
- High school: Cardinal Gibbons (Fort Lauderdale)
- College: Maryland (1996–1998); Rhode Island (1999)
- NFL draft: 2000: undrafted

Career history

Playing
- Florida Bobcats (2001)*; Florida Firecats (2001); Chicago Bears (2002)*; Amsterdam Admirals (2002)*; Scottish Claymores (2002); Amsterdam Admirals (2002); Chicago Rush (2003)*; Detroit Fury (2003); Florida Firecats (2003); Detroit Fury (2004)*; Dallas Desperadoes (2004); Florida Firecats (2004)
- * Offseason or practice squad member only

Coaching
- Florida Firecats (2005–2008) (OC)

Awards and highlights
- ArenaCup champion (2004)

Ken Mastrole (born February 25, 1977) is an American former football player. He played as a quarterback in the National Football League (NFL), NFL Europe, and intercollegiate football at the University of Maryland and University of Rhode Island.

== Early life ==
Mastrole was born on February 25, 1977, and raised in Fort Lauderdale, Florida. He attended Cardinal Gibbons High School where he played football. He was highly recruited out of high school, with interest from Duke, Miami, Clemson, and Virginia Tech. He ultimately chose to attend Maryland. His high school coach said that "he liked everything about Maryland—the atmosphere, the school, the curriculum, the football program."

== College career ==
=== Maryland ===
Mastrole sat out his true freshman year in 1995 on redshirt status. During the following two seasons, he served as the back-up behind starting quarterback Brian Cummings.

In 1996, he saw action in eight games, including three starts. Mastrole was the first redshirt freshman to ever start as a quarterback at Maryland. He recorded a total of 36 completions in 89 attempts for 354 yards and one touchdown. Against Virginia, starting quarterback Brian Cummings separated his right shoulder, and Mastrole relieved him. He recorded nine completions on 15 attempts for 66 yards and two interceptions. Mastrole started against West Virginia in place of an injured Brian Cummings, and became the first quarterback in Maryland history to start as a freshman. The following week, he started against NC State, where he completed 15 of 28 pass attempts for 140 yards and one interception. In that game, he completed a career-best 52-yard pass to Geroy Simon in the fourth quarter and then connected with tight end Tim Brown for a two-point conversion. He started against Duke in place of Cummings who had suffered a concussion the previous week. Mastrole completed five of 17 passes for 106 yards including his career first touchdown pass, but suffered a fractured right clavicle which ended his season.

In 1997, he saw action in seven games as a backup and threw 19 passes. Against Florida State, he saw action in the Terrapins' last two series, where he completed one pass for nine yards and made two rushing attempts. Against Virginia, he completed three of 11 pass attempts for 47 yards.

In 1998, Mastrole shared playing time with Randall Jones. Mastrole started against West Virginia, but was held to three completions on nine passes for 27 yards, before being replaced by Jones in the third quarter. In the fourth game of the season, against Temple, Mastrole completed a 39-yard pass for his first touchdown since the 1996 season.

=== Rhode Island ===
After Maryland head coach Ron Vanderlinden changed the offensive scheme to the option, Mastrole, a drop-back passer, decided to transfer. For his senior season in 1999, he transferred to the University of Rhode Island, which employed a three-receiver offense. There, he completed 202 passes on 374 attempts for 2,113 yards, ten interceptions, and seven touchdowns. He also rushed for a net gain of 90 yards. Rhode Island compiled a 1–10 record that season.

== Professional career ==
=== Florida Bobcats ===
Mastrole signed with the Florida Bobcats on February 9, 2001. He was waived by the Bobcats on April 10, 2001.

=== Florida Firecats ===
Mastrole then signed with the Florida Firecats of the af2 in April 2001 and played for the team during the 2001 season. In November 2001, he auditioned for the Carolina Panthers, who needed a quarterback after injuries to Chris Weinke and Dameyune Craig.

=== Chicago Bears ===
==== Amsterdam Admirals ====
Mastrole was allocated by the Chicago Bears to the Amsterdam Admirals in the NFL Europe. He was cut on March 31, 2002.

==== Scottish Claymores ====
On May 3, Mastrole was signed by the Scottish Claymores as a reserve behind starter Scott Dreisbach and backup James Brown.

==== Amsterdam Admirals (second stint) ====
On May 16, Mastrole was activated from the Amsterdam practice squad to serve as the second-string quarterback, and saw action against Barcelona. With Amsterdam, Mastrole completed 12 of 28 passes for 147 yards, two interceptions, and one touchdown. In 2002, he competed for the Bears third-string quarterback position. In the preseason game against St. Louis Rams, Mastrole led an 81-yard drive for the game-winning touchdown. He lost out to Henry Burris.

=== Chicago Rush ===
Mastrole signed with the Chicago Rush on December 3, 2002. He was waived by the Rush on January 24, 2003.

=== Detroit Fury ===
Mastrole later signed with the Detroit Fury. He was waived from the Fury's practice squad on May 5, 2003.

=== Florida Firecats (second stint) ===
Mastrole then returned to the Firecats in May 2003, throwing for 2,284 yards and 55 touchdowns in 11 games. Mastrole said "I could have stayed in Detroit, but I left on my own terms" and that "I figured I'd take a pay cut and go play."

=== Detroit Fury (second stint) ===
Mastrole signed with the Fury in November 2003.

=== Dallas Desperadoes ===
In January 2004, Mastrole was traded to the Dallas Desperadoes for future considerations.

=== Florida Firecats (third stint) ===
Mastrole served as a back-up for the Desperadoes before requesting his release to return to the Firecats. During the 2004 season, he recorded 59 completions on 94 attempts for 733 yards, four interceptions, and 15 touchdowns. He led Florida to the ArenaCup, where they defeated the Peoria Pirates, 39–26.

== Coaching career ==
In 2005, Mastrole became the Florida Firecats offensive coordinator and served in that role through the 2008 season. Over those four years, he directed the league's number-one scoring offense, the number-one rated quarterback, and three 1,000-yard wide receivers.

== Personal life ==
He lives in Florida with his wife, Kim, and stepson, Dylan. Mastrole now runs his own football training camp in Florida, the Mastrole Passing Academy.
