= Latrez Harrison =

American football player (born 1980)

Latrez Harrison (born July 30, 1980, in Atlanta, Georgia) is a former Arena Football League wide receiver/defensive back for the New York Dragons. He attended the University of Maryland. Harrison played quarterback at Maryland as a true freshman in 1999 and again in 2001 as a redshirt sophomore. He was converted into a wide receiver for his junior and senior seasons.

He attended Booker T. Washington High School in Atlanta, Georgia where he was named an honorable mention All-American by USA Today.
