= Sam Hollenbach =

American football player (born 1983)

No. 3
- Position: Quarterback

Personal information
- Born: September 9, 1983 (age 43); Doylestown, Pennsylvania, U.S.
- Listed height: 6 ft 5 in (1.96 m)
- Listed weight: 232 lb (105 kg)

Career information
- High school: Perkasie (PA) Pennridge
- College: Maryland
- NFL draft: 2007: undrafted

Career history
- Washington Redskins (2007)

Awards and highlights
- Champ Sports Bowl MVP (2006)

Samuel Hollenbach (/ˈhɒlɛnbɑːk/; born September 9, 1983) is an American former professional football quarterback. He was signed by the Washington Redskins as an undrafted free agent in 2007. He played college football for the Maryland Terrapins.

== Early life ==
While attending Pennridge High School, Hollenbach's coach was his father, Jeff, a former Illinois quarterback.

== College career ==
During his college career, Hollenbach went 15-9 in games he started at Quarterback. He completed 417 of 679 passes for 5,139 yards with 28 touchdowns and 26 interceptions in the Atlantic Coast Conference.
