= George V. Chalmers =

American athlete (1907–1984)

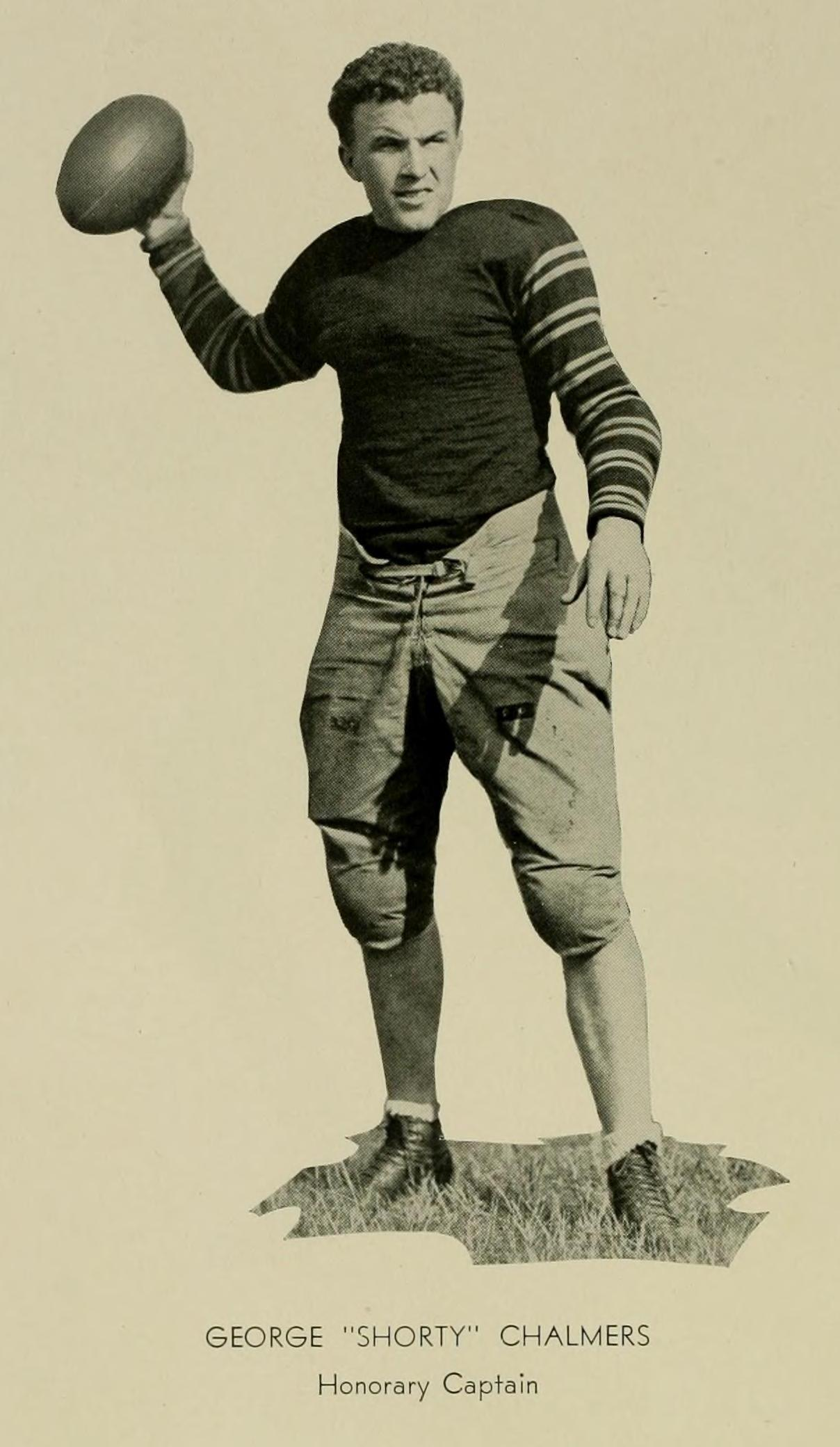
- Chalmers at Maryland in 1931

Maryland Terrapins
- Position: Quarterback

Career information
- College: Maryland (1929–1931)

George V. "Shorty" Chalmers (November 19, 1907 – March 1984) was an American college athlete. He served as the quarterback of the University of Maryland football team from 1929 to 1931. Chalmers also played basketball and baseball at Maryland. He has been inducted into the Delaware Sports Hall of Fame and the University of Maryland Athletic Hall of Fame.

== College career ==
A native of New Castle, Delaware, Chalmers attended the University of Maryland, where he was a multi-sport athlete. He competed in football as a back, basketball as a forward, and baseball as an infielder. On the football team, Chalmers was a wingback and played a pivotal passing role in head coach Curley Byrd's high-powered double-wing offense, with his primary receiver being Boze Berger. In Tales From The Maryland Terrapins, author David Ungrady called that tandem "one of the most dangerous pass-catch combinations in Maryland history."

Chalmers played on the freshman football team in 1928 before he "graduated" to the varsity, where he helped replace the loss of Gerald Snyder and Gordon Kessler to graduation. During the 1929 season, he was one of the "heroes of Maryland's dramatic finish" in its upset 13–13 tie against Yale, alongside Moon Evans and Bosey Berger. Chalmers tallied one of the Old Liners' touchdowns on a pass to Berger.

In 1931, Chalmers and Berger helped lead the Old Liners to an 8–1–1 record, and one of the best seasons of Coach Byrd's 24-year tenure. That season, Chalmers was one of four Maryland backs named to The Baltimore Sun's All-Maryland team. The paper noted, "Complete dominance of State football by the University of Maryland during 1931 is reflected in the naming of The Sun's All-Maryland team. While selection of all four backs from a single team is unprecedented, so is the manner in which that team swept aside all opposition in this territory." The Sun called him "one of Maryland's triple threats", as a player capable of advancing the ball through the forward pass, the rush, or by tallying points through kicking, and considered him the best forward passer in the South.

He graduated from Maryland in 1932 with a Bachelor of Arts degree from the College of Education. He earned a total of 12 letters during his college tenure, four each in football, basketball, and baseball. Chalmers was a member of the Sigma Nu fraternity, the Omicron Delta Kappa honor society, the Student Congress, and the "M" Club athletic alumni organization. The school yearbook named him the "Best Senior Athlete" in 1932. As a student, Chalmers raised pigeons as a hobby, and at one point boasted more than 110 of the birds.

== Later life ==
After graduation, Chalmers remained involved in football in the Maryland area as a referee. In 1932, he served as head coach of the independent Newark Yellow Jackets. In 1933, he was signed by the Philadelphia-based professional football team, the Frankford Legion.

He was inducted into the Delaware Sports Hall of Fame in 1981. Chalmers was also inducted into the University of Maryland Athletic Hall of Fame in 1983.
