= 1999 Houston Cougars football team =

American college football season

1999 Houston Cougars football
- Conference: Conference USA
- Record: 7–4 (3–3 C-USA)
- Head coach: Kim Helton (7th season)
- Offensive coordinator: Les Koenning (1st season)
- Offensive scheme: Multiple
- Defensive coordinator: Dick Bumpas (1st season)
- Base defense: 4–3
- Captains: Ketric Sanford; Mike James; Jeff Medford
- Home stadium: Robertson Stadium

1999 Conference USA football standings
	Conf.			Overall
Team	W		L	W		L
No. 14 Southern Miss $	6	–	0	9	–	3
East Carolina	4	–	2	9	–	3
Louisville	4	–	2	7	–	5
UAB	4	–	2	5	–	6
Memphis	4	–	2	5	–	6
Houston	3	–	3	7	–	4
Army	1	–	5	3	–	8
Tulane	1	–	5	3	–	8
Cincinnati	0	–	6	3	–	8
$ – Conference champion; Rankings from AP Poll

The 1999 Houston Cougars football team, also known as the Houston Cougars, Houston, or UH represented the University of Houston in the 1999 NCAA Division I-A football season. It was the 54th year of season play for Houston. The team was coached by Kim Helton. The team played its home games at Robertson Stadium, a 32,000-person capacity stadium on-campus in Houston.

== Schedule ==
Date	Time	Opponent	Site	TV	Result	Attendance	Source
September 4	7:00 pm	Rice*	Robertson Stadium; Houston, TX (rivalry)		W 28–3	31,784	
September 11	11:30 am	at No. 21 Alabama*	Legion Field; Birmingham, AL	JPS	L 10–37	80,110	
September 18	7:00 pm	Louisiana–Lafayette*	Robertson Stadium; Houston, TX		W 45–0	15,686	
September 25	6:00 pm	at UAB	Legion Field; Birmingham, AL		L 10–29	28,573	
October 9	2:30 pm	Cincinnati^{†}	Robertson Stadium; Houston, TX		W 23–20	22,315	
October 16	12:30 pm	at North Carolina*	Kenan Memorial Stadium; Chapel Hill, NC		W 20–12	38,000	
October 23	1:00 pm	at Louisville	Papa John's Cardinal Stadium; Louisville, KY		L 33–39	27,261	
October 30	2:30 pm	No. 17 East Carolina	Robertson Stadium; Houston, TX	FSN	L 3–19	14,221	
November 6	2:30 pm	Tulane	Robertson Stadium; Houston, TX		W 36–31	16,008	
November 13	7:00 pm	at LSU*	Tiger Stadium; Baton Rouge, LA		W 20–7	76,671	
November 20	12:00 pm	at Army	Michie Stadium; West Point, NY		W 26–14	35,526	
*Non-conference game; ^{†}Homecoming; Rankings from AP Poll released prior to the game; All times are in Central time

== Roster ==
1999 Houston Cougars football team roster
Players
Coaches
Offense

Pos.	#	Name	Class
RB	1	Joffrey Reynolds	Fr
RB	2	Mike Green	Sr
QB	11	Bubba Teague	Fr
QB	13	Brian Thiebaud	Jr
WR	14	Damien Montgomery	Jr
QB	15	Tyson Helton	Sr
QB	16	Jason McKinley	Jr
OT	71	Josh Lovelady	Jr

Defense

Pos.	#	Name	Class
S	19	Micah Malone	Sr
DB	20	Alvin Lee	Jr
CB	35	William Fields	Sr
S	46	David Williams	Jr
DT	90	Adriano Belli	Sr
DL	91	Nikia Adderston	Jr
DT	92	Mike Knepper	Sr
LB	93	Jason Hoelscher	Jr
DT	94	Kevin Payne	So
DE	95	Grover Thompson	Jr
DT	96	Robin Tremblay	So

Special teams

Pos.	#	Name	Class

Head coach

- Kim Helton

Coordinators/assistant coaches

Legend

- (C) Team captain
- (S) Suspended
- (I) Ineligible
- Injured
- Redshirt

Roster
Last update: 2000-09-02

== Team players in the NFL ==
Player	Position	Round	Pick	NFL club
Mike Green	Running back	7	213	Tennessee Titans
