= 1996 Southern Miss Golden Eagles football team =

American college football season

1996 Southern Miss Golden Eagles football

Conference USA co-champion
- Conference: Conference USA
- Record: 8–3 (4–1 C-USA)
- Head coach: Jeff Bower (7th season)
- Offensive coordinator: Norman Joseph (3rd season)
- Offensive scheme: Multiple
- Defensive coordinator: John Thompson (5th season)
- Base defense: Multiple
- Home stadium: M. M. Roberts Stadium

1996 Conference USA football standings
	Conf.			Overall
Team	W		L	W		L
Houston +	4	–	1	7	–	5
Southern Miss +	4	–	1	8	–	3
Cincinnati	2	–	3	6	–	5
Louisville	2	–	3	5	–	6
Memphis	2	–	3	4	–	7
Tulane	1	–	4	2	–	9
+ – Conference co-champions; Rankings from AP Poll

The 1996 Southern Miss Golden Eagles football team represented the University of Southern Mississippi in the 1996 NCAA Division I-A football season. The Golden Eagles were led by seventh-year head coach Jeff Bower and played their home games at M. M. Roberts Stadium. In the inaugural season of Conference USA, Southern Miss claimed a share of the conference championship with Houston after finishing 4–1 in conference, and 8–3 overall.

== Schedule ==
Date	Opponent	Rank	Site	Result	Attendance	Source
August 31	at Georgia*		Sanford Stadium; Athens, GA	W 11–7	81,067	
September 7	at No. 14 Alabama*		Legion Field; Birmingham, AL	L 10–20	82,338	
September 14	Utah State*		M. M. Roberts Stadium; Hattiesburg, MS	W 31–24	24,307	
September 21	Southwestern Louisiana*		M. M. Roberts Stadium; Hattiesburg, MS	W 52–27	23,169	
September 28	at Louisville		Cardinal Stadium; Louisville, KY	W 24–7	36,462	
October 10	at East Carolina*		Dowdy–Ficklen Stadium; Greenville, NC	W 28–7	34,480	
October 19	Memphis		M. M. Roberts Stadium; Hattiesburg, MS (Black and Blue Bowl)	W 16–0	25,601	
October 26	at Tulane	No. 24	Louisiana Superdome; New Orleans, LA (rivalry)	W 31–28	20,394	
November 2	Cincinnati^{†}	No. 23	M. M. Roberts Stadium; Hattiesburg, MS	W 21–17	25,241	
November 9	at Houston	No. 20	Robertson Stadium; Houston, TX	L 49–56	18,107	
November 16	at No. 3 Florida State*	No. 25	Doak Campbell Stadium; Tallahassee, FL	L 14–54	77,280	
*Non-conference game; ^{†}Homecoming; Rankings from AP Poll released prior to the game

== Rankings ==
Ranking movements Legend: ██ Increase in ranking ██ Decrease in ranking — = Not ranked
	Week																	
Poll	Pre	1	2	3	4	5	6	7	8	9	10	11	12	13	14	15	16	Final
AP	—	—	—	—	—	—	—	—	—	24	23	20	25	—	—	—	—	—
Coaches	—		—	—	—	—	—	—	—	—	24	22	—	—	—	—	—	—

== Roster ==
1996 Southern Miss Golden Eagles football team roster
Players
Coaches
Offense

Pos.	#	Name	Class
TE	86	Matt Coghlan	Jr
WR	80	Todd Pinkston	Fr
OL	79	Brian Bell	Fr

Defense

Pos.	#	Name	Class
DB	24	Terrence Parrish	Fr
DB	20	Perry Phenix	So
DL	99	Quantrelis Phillips	Jr
DE	53	Adalius Thomas	Fr
CB	3	Rod Thomas	Sr

Special teams

Pos.	#	Name	Class

Head coach

- Jeff Bower

Coordinators/assistant coaches

- Dave Wommack – Defensive backs

Legend

- (C) Team captain
- (S) Suspended
- (I) Ineligible
- Injured
- Redshirt

Roster
