= 1999 Louisville Cardinals football team =

American college football season

1999 Louisville Cardinals football

Humanitarian Bowl, L 31–34 vs. Boise State
- Conference: Conference USA
- Record: 7–5 (4–2 C–USA)
- Head coach: John L. Smith (2nd season)
- Offensive coordinator: Scott Linehan (1st season)
- Offensive scheme: Pro-style
- Defensive coordinator: Chris Smeland (2nd season)
- Base defense: 4–3
- Home stadium: Papa John's Cardinal Stadium

1999 Conference USA football standings
	Conf.			Overall
Team	W		L	W		L
No. 14 Southern Miss $	6	–	0	9	–	3
East Carolina	4	–	2	9	–	3
Louisville	4	–	2	7	–	5
UAB	4	–	2	5	–	6
Memphis	4	–	2	5	–	6
Houston	3	–	3	7	–	4
Army	1	–	5	3	–	8
Tulane	1	–	5	3	–	8
Cincinnati	0	–	6	3	–	8
$ – Conference champion; Rankings from AP Poll

The 1999 Louisville Cardinals football team represented the University of Louisville as a member of Conference USA (C-USA) during the 1999 NCAA Division I-A football season. Led by second-year head coach John L. Smith, the Cardinals compiled an overall record of 7–5 with a mark of 4–2 in conference play, placing in a four-way tie for second in C-USA. Louisville was invited to the Humanitarian Bowl, where the Cardinals lost to Boise State. The team played home game at Papa John's Cardinal Stadium in Louisville, Kentucky.

== Schedule ==
Date	Time	Opponent	Site	TV	Result	Attendance	Source
September 4	3:30 pm	at Kentucky*	Commonwealth Stadium; Lexington, KY (Governor's Cup)	FSN	W 56–28	70,692	
September 11	7:00 pm	Chattanooga*	Papa John's Cardinal Stadium; Louisville, KY		W 58–30	38,147	
September 18	7:00 pm	Illinois*	Papa John's Cardinal Stadium; Louisville, KY		L 36–41	40,332	
September 25	3:30 pm	Oklahoma*	Papa John's Cardinal Stadium; Louisville, KY	FSN	L 21–42	41,214	
October 2	7:00 pm	Eastern Michigan*	Papa John's Cardinal Stadium; Louisville, KY		W 45–10	33,879	
October 7	7:00 pm	at Army*	Michie Stadium; West Point, NY	FSN	L 52–59 ^{2OT}	26,535	
October 16	8:00 pm	at Memphis	Liberty Bowl Memorial Stadium; Memphis, TN (rivalry)		W 32–31	30,315	
October 23	2:00 pm	Houston	Papa John's Cardinal Stadium; Louisville, KY		W 39–33	27,261	
October 30	2:00 pm	UAB	Papa John's Cardinal Stadium; Louisville, KY		W 23–14	34,786	
November 6	3:30 pm	at Cincinnati	Nippert Stadium; Cincinnati, OH (The Keg of Nails)		W 23–13	26,399	
November 20	3:00 pm	No. 18 Southern Miss	Papa John's Cardinal Stadium; Louisville, KY	FSN	L 27–30	41,826	
December 30	3:00 pm	vs. Boise State*	Bronco Stadium; Boise, ID (Humanitarian Bowl)	ESPN2	L 31–34	29,283	
*Non-conference game; Rankings from AP Poll released prior to the game; All times are in Eastern time

== Roster ==
1999 Louisville Cardinals football team roster
Players
Coaches
Offense

Pos.	#	Name	Class
TE	6	Ibn Green	Sr
QB	7	Chris Redman	Sr
WR	9	Deion Branch	So
WR	10	Arnold Jackson	Sr
WR	12	LaVell Boyd	Sr
QB	15	Dave Ragone	Fr
RB	32	Frank Moreau	Sr
RB	44	Henry Miller	Fr
G	61	Aaron Dardzinski	So
OT	65	Anthony Bird	Sr
OL	66	Eric Wampler	Fr
G	67	Scott Graham	Fr
OL	68	Dan Koons	Fr
OL	69	Jason Hilliard	Fr
OT	71	Mark Grivna	Sr
C	73	Jason Padget	Jr
G	75	Geoff McBarnette	Sr
OT	76	Rob Eble	So
G	77	Joe O'Shaughnessy	Jr
OL	78	Brian Devine	Fr
WR	80	Zek Parker	Jr

Defense

Pos.	#	Name	Class
CB	2	Rashad Holman	Jr
CB	3	Antonio Roundtree	Jr
DE	58	Dewayne White	Fr
DT	79	Donovan Arp	Jr

Special teams

Pos.	#	Name	Class
K	23	Jon Hilbert	Sr

Head coach

- John L. Smith

Coordinators/assistant coaches

- Mike Cox (LB)
- Johnny Nansen (GA)

Legend

- (C) Team captain
- (S) Suspended
- (I) Ineligible
- Injured
- Redshirt

Roster
Last update: 1999-11-27

== Team players in the NFL ==
Player	Position	Round	Pick	NFL club
Chris Redman	Quarterback	3	75	Baltimore Ravens
