= 1999 Army Black Knights football team =

American college football season

1999 Army Black Knights football
- Conference: Conference USA
- Record: 3–8 (1–5 C-USA)
- Head coach: Bob Sutton (9th season)
- Offensive coordinator: Ed Warinner (2nd season)
- Offensive scheme: Triple option
- Defensive coordinator: Denny Doornbos (9th season)
- Base defense: 4–3
- Captains: Shaun Castillo; Nate Hunterton
- Home stadium: Michie Stadium

1999 Conference USA football standings
	Conf.			Overall
Team	W		L	W		L
No. 14 Southern Miss $	6	–	0	9	–	3
East Carolina	4	–	2	9	–	3
Louisville	4	–	2	7	–	5
UAB	4	–	2	5	–	6
Memphis	4	–	2	5	–	6
Houston	3	–	3	7	–	4
Army	1	–	5	3	–	8
Tulane	1	–	5	3	–	8
Cincinnati	0	–	6	3	–	8
$ – Conference champion; Rankings from AP Poll

The 1999 Army Black Knights football team was an American football team that represented the United States Military Academy as a member of Conference USA (C-USA) in the 1999 NCAA Division I-A football season. In their ninth season under head coach Bob Sutton, the Black Knights compiled a 3–8 record and were outscored by their opponents by a combined total of 317 to 225. In the annual Army–Navy Game, the Black Knights lost to Navy, 19–9.

== Schedule ==
Date	Time	Opponent	Site	TV	Result	Attendance	Source
September 11	12:00 p.m.	Wake Forest*	Michie Stadium; West Point, NY	FSN	L 15–34	29,646	
September 18	6:00 p.m.	at Tulane	Louisiana Superdome; New Orleans, LA		L 28–48	22,277	
September 25		Ball State*	Michie Stadium; West Point, NY		W 41–21	30,082	
October 2	12:00 p.m.	No. 19 East Carolina	Michie Stadium; West Point, NY	FSN	L 14–33	36,769	
October 7	7:00 p.m.	Louisville	Michie Stadium; West Point, NY	FSN	W 59–52 ^{OT}	26,535	
October 16		at No. 25 Southern Miss	M. M. Roberts Stadium; Hattiesburg, MS		L 0–24	26,054	
October 23		New Mexico State*	Michie Stadium; West Point, NY		W 35–18	39,381	
November 6		at Air Force*	Falcon Stadium; Colorado Springs, CO (Commander-in-Chief's Trophy)		L 0–28	53,155	
November 13	2:00 p.m.	at Memphis	Liberty Bowl Memorial Stadium; Memphis, TN		L 10–14	22,869	
November 20	1:00 p.m.	Houston	Michie Stadium; West Point, NY		L 14–26	35,526	
December 4		vs. Navy*	Veterans Stadium; Philadelphia, PA (Army–Navy Game)	CBS	L 9–19	70.049	
*Non-conference game; Rankings from AP Poll released prior to the game; All times are in Eastern time

== Game summaries ==
=== vs Navy ===
Army Black Knights (3–7) vs. Navy Midshipmen (4–7)

Quarter	1	2	3	4	Total
Navy	7	6	3	3	19
Army	0	3	0	6	9

at Veterans Stadium, Philadelphia, Pennsylvania

- Date: December 4, 1999
- Game attendance: 70,049
- TV announcers (CBS): Sean McDonough, Todd Blackledge, Michele Tafoya, and Ed Cunningham
- Box Score

Game information

First quarter

- NAVY – Brian Madden 2-yard run (Tim Shubzda kick). Navy 7–0.

Second quarter

- NAVY – Tim Shubzda 35-yard field goal. Navy 10–0.
- ARMY – Matt Parker 44-yard field goal. Navy 10–3.
- NAVY – Tim Shubzda 34-yard field goal. Navy 13–3.

Third quarter

- NAVY – Tim Shubzda 37-yard field goal. Navy 16–3.

Fourth quarter

- NAVY – Tim Shubzda 38-yard field goal. Navy 19–3.
- ARMY – Shaun Castillo 2-yard pass from Joe Gerena (two-point conversion failed). Navy 19–9.

Top passers

- NAVY – Brian Madden – 3/4, 27 yards
- ARMY – Joe Gerena – 7/19, 95 yards, TD, INT

Top rushers

- NAVY – Brian Madden – 41 rushes, 177 yards, TD
- ARMY – Michael Wallace – 25 rushes, 76 yards

Top receivers

- NAVY – Matt O'Donnell – 2 receptions, 19 yards
- ARMY – Grady Jett – 2 receptions, 26 yards

100th meeting (75th in Philadelphia)

- Roger Staubach, Joe Bellino, and Pete Dawkins appeared for the ceremonial coin toss

External videos
- Full game

== Roster ==
1999 Army Black Knights football team roster
Players
Coaches
Offense

Pos.	#	Name	Class
WR		Brian Bowdish
OL		Brandon Calhoun
RB		Vaughn Carpenter
WR		Shaun Castillo
RB		Brandon Dickens
WR		Clint Dodson
RB		Reno Ferri
QB		Joe Gerena	Jr
OL		John Gonzalez
QB		Chad Jenkins	So
WR		Grady Jett
RB		John Johnson
OL		Mike Larkin
RB		Lawrence Lewis
RB		Alton McCallum
OL		Randy Overstreet
OL		Dustin Plumadore
RB		Walter Rittger
RB		Brandan Rooney
RB		Calvin Smith
RB		Omari Thompson
QB		John Thurman
RB		Michael Wallace
WR		Gary Williams

Defense

Pos.	#	Name	Class
DB	17	Tony Coaxum	Sr
DB		Brent Dial
LB		Jason Frazier
DB		Derrick Goodwin
DL		David Hageman
LB		Nate Hunterton
DL		Zac Hurst
LB		Brandon Kelley
DL		Brian King
DL		Scott Kozak
DB		Derick McNally
DL		Ron Sporer
LB	6	Lyle Weaver	Jr
DB		Brian Zickefoose

Special teams

Pos.	#	Name	Class
K		Matt Parker
P		Graham White

Head coach

- Bob Sutton

Coordinators/assistant coaches

Legend

- (C) Team captain
- (S) Suspended
- (I) Ineligible
- Injured
- Redshirt
