= 1999 East Carolina Pirates football team =

American college football season

1999 East Carolina Pirates football

Mobile Alabama Bowl, L 14–28 vs. TCU
- Conference: Conference USA
- Record: 9–3 (4–2 C-USA)
- Head coach: Steve Logan (8th season)
- Offensive coordinator: Doug Martin (4th season)
- Offensive scheme: Spread
- Defensive coordinator: Tim Rose (1st season)
- Base defense: 4–3
- Home stadium: Dowdy–Ficklen Stadium

1999 Conference USA football standings
	Conf.			Overall
Team	W		L	W		L
No. 14 Southern Miss $	6	–	0	9	–	3
East Carolina	4	–	2	9	–	3
Louisville	4	–	2	7	–	5
UAB	4	–	2	5	–	6
Memphis	4	–	2	5	–	6
Houston	3	–	3	7	–	4
Army	1	–	5	3	–	8
Tulane	1	–	5	3	–	8
Cincinnati	0	–	6	3	–	8
$ – Conference champion; Rankings from AP Poll

The 1999 East Carolina Pirates football team was an American football team that represented East Carolina University as a member of Conference USA during the 1999 NCAA Division I-A football season. In their eighth season under head coach Steve Logan, the team compiled a 9–3 record. The Pirates offense scored 333 points while the defense allowed 225 points.

== Schedule ==
Date	Time	Opponent	Rank	Site	TV	Result	Attendance	Source
September 4	3:00 pm	vs. West Virginia*		Ericsson Stadium; Charlotte, NC	ESPN2	W 30–23	47,860	
September 11	3:30 pm	Duke*		Dowdy–Ficklen Stadium; Greenville, NC	FSN	W 27–9	42,052	
September 18	7:00 pm	at South Carolina*		Williams–Brice Stadium; Columbia, SC	TWC30	W 21–3	82,605	
September 25	6:00 pm	No. 9 Miami (FL)*		Carter–Finley Stadium; Raleigh, NC^{[a]}	ESPN2	W 27–23	45,900	
October 2	12:00 pm	at Army	No. 19	Michie Stadium; West Point, NY	FSN	W 33–14	36,769	
October 9	3:30 pm	Southern Miss	No. 16	Dowdy–Ficklen Stadium; Greenville, NC	FSN	L 22–39	39,418	
October 23	4:00 pm	Tulane^{†}	No. 20	Dowdy–Ficklen Stadium; Greenville, NC	FSS	W 52–7	35,021	
October 30	3:30 pm	at Houston	No. 17	Robertson Stadium; Houston, TX	FSN	W 19–3	14,221	
November 6	2:00 pm	at UAB	No. 18	Legion Field; Birmingham, AL		L 17–36	18,062	
November 13	3:30 pm	Cincinnati	No. 24	Dowdy–Ficklen Stadium; Greenville, NC	FSN	W 48–34	33,912	
November 20	12:00 pm	NC State*	No. 23	Dowdy–Ficklen Stadium; Greenville, NC (rivalry)	TWC30	W 23–6	50,092	
December 22	7:30 pm	vs. TCU*	No. 20	Ladd–Peebles Stadium; Mobile, AL (Mobile Alabama Bowl)	ESPN2	L 14–28	34,200	
*Non-conference game; ^{†}Homecoming; Rankings from AP Poll released prior to the game; All times are in Eastern time

^{^[a]}The game was moved from Greenville to Raleigh due to Hurricane Floyd.
