= 1999 Southern Miss Golden Eagles football team =

American college football season

1999 Southern Miss Golden Eagles football

Conference USA champion Liberty Bowl champion

Liberty Bowl, W 23–17 vs. Colorado State
- Conference: Conference USA

Ranking
- Coaches: No. 13
- AP: No. 14
- Record: 9–3 (6–0 C-USA)
- Head coach: Jeff Bower (10th season)
- Offensive coordinator: Larry Kueck (3rd season)
- Offensive scheme: Pro-style
- Defensive coordinator: Dave Wommack (1st season)
- Base defense: 4–3
- Home stadium: M. M. Roberts Stadium

1999 Conference USA football standings
	Conf.			Overall
Team	W		L	W		L
No. 14 Southern Miss $	6	–	0	9	–	3
East Carolina	4	–	2	9	–	3
Louisville	4	–	2	7	–	5
UAB	4	–	2	5	–	6
Memphis	4	–	2	5	–	6
Houston	3	–	3	7	–	4
Army	1	–	5	3	–	8
Tulane	1	–	5	3	–	8
Cincinnati	0	–	6	3	–	8
$ – Conference champion; Rankings from AP Poll

The 1999 Southern Miss Golden Eagles football team represented the University of Southern Mississippi in the 1999 NCAA Division I-A football season. The Golden Eagles were led by head coach Jeff Bower and played their home games at M. M. Roberts Stadium. They secured their third Conference USA conference championship after finishing 6–0 in conference play. Their overall record was 9–3, and they were invited to play in the 1999 Liberty Bowl, where they defeated Colorado State, 23–17. In the final AP Poll of the year, the Golden Eagles were ranked 14th, which is to date the highest finish in school history.

== Schedule ==
Date	Opponent	Rank	Site	TV	Result	Attendance	Source
September 6	Tulane		M. M. Roberts Stadium; Hattiesburg, MS (Battle for the Bell)		W 48–14	30,098	
September 11	Northwestern State*		M. M. Roberts Stadium; Hattiesburg, MS		W 40–6	24,871	
September 18	at No. 4 Nebraska*		Memorial Stadium; Lincoln, NE		L 13–20	77,826	
September 25	at No. 5 Texas A&M*		Kyle Field; College Station, TX	ABC	L 6–23	65,264	
October 9	at No. 16 East Carolina		Dowdy–Ficklen Stadium; Greenville, NC		W 39–22	39,418	
October 16	Army	No. 25	M. M. Roberts Stadium; Hattiesburg, MS		W 24–0	26,054	
October 23	Cincinnati	No. 21	M. M. Roberts Stadium; Hattiesburg, MS		W 28–20	24,012	
October 30	at No. 14 Alabama*	No. 20	Bryant–Denny Stadium; Tuscaloosa, AL		L 14–35	83,818	
November 6	at Memphis	No. 25	Liberty Bowl Memorial Stadium; Memphis, TN (Black and Blue Bowl)		W 20–5	23,635	
November 13	Louisiana–Lafayette*^{†}	No. 21	M. M. Roberts Stadium; Hattiesburg, MS		W 48–0	24,133	
November 20	at Louisville	No. 18	Papa John's Cardinal Stadium; Louisville, KY		W 30–27	41,826	
December 31	vs. Colorado State*	No. 16	Liberty Bowl Memorial Stadium; Memphis, TN (Liberty Bowl)	ESPN	W 23–17	56,570	
*Non-conference game; ^{†}Homecoming; Rankings from AP Poll released prior to the game

== Roster ==
1999 Southern Miss Golden Eagles football team roster
Players
Coaches
Offense

Pos.	#	Name	Class
QB	17	Jeff Kelly	So
RB	43	Derrick Nix	So
OL	55	Billy Clay	Jr
OL	79	Brian Bell	Sr
WR	80	Todd Pinkston	Sr
WR	81	Dannye Fowler	So
WR	82	LeRoy Handy	Fr
WR	83	Shawn Mills	Jr
TE	84	Orlando Dantzler	So
WR	85	Antonio Gray	So
WR	86	Kevin Thompson	Sr
TE	88	Buck Miciotto	Fr
TE	89	Kenderick Key	Jr

Defense

Pos.	#	Name	Class
CB	19	Raymond Walls	Jr
DL	90	Daleroy Stewart	Jr
DL	91	Roamie Williams	Fr
DL	92	Travis Dorsey	Fr
DL	93	Gerald Mumford	Jr
DL	94	Paul Ulrich	So
DL	95	Marchene Hatchett	Jr
DL	96	Cedric Scott	Jr
DE	97	Adalius Thomas	Sr
DL	98	John Nix	Jr

Special teams

Pos.	#	Name	Class

Head coach

- Jeff Bower

Coordinators/assistant coaches

- Dave Wommack – Assistant head coach / defensive backs

Legend

- (C) Team captain
- (S) Suspended
- (I) Ineligible
- Injured
- Redshirt
