= Kim Helton =

American football player and coach (born 1948)

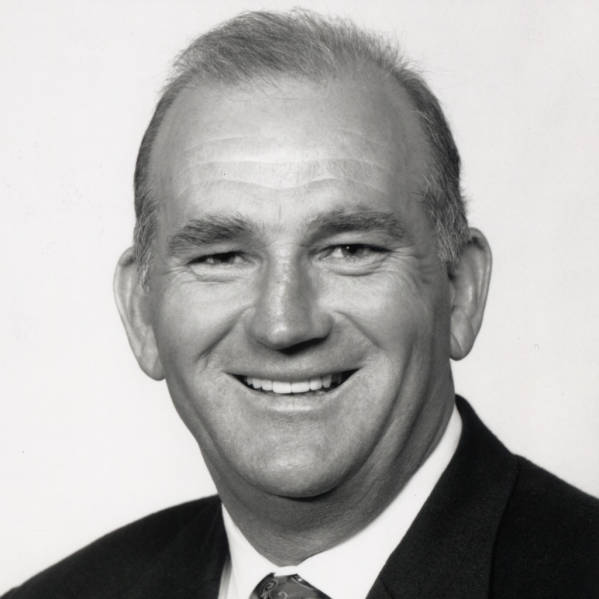

Biographical details
- Born: July 28, 1948 (age 78); Pensacola, Florida, U.S.

Playing career
- 1967–1969: Florida
- Position: Center

Coaching career (HC unless noted)
- 1970–1971: Eastside HS (FL)
- 1972: Florida (GA)
- 1973–1978: Florida (OL)
- 1979–1982: Miami (FL) (OC)
- 1983–1986: Tampa Bay Buccaneers (OL)
- 1987–1989: Houston Oilers (OL)
- 1990–1992: Los Angeles Raiders (OL)
- 1993–1999: Houston
- 2002–2003: Washington Redskins (OL)
- 2004–2006: Toronto Argonauts (RB)
- 2007–2011: UAB (OC)
- 2019: Western Kentucky (offensive analyst)

Head coaching record
- Overall: 24–53–1
- Bowls: 0–1

Accomplishments and honors

Championships
- 1 C-USA (1996)

Awards
- C-USA Coach of the Year (1996)

Charles Kimberlin Helton (born July 28, 1948) is an American college and professional football coach. He served as the head football coach of the University of Houston from 1993 to 1999, compiling a record of 24–53–1. His sons Clay and Tyson Helton both rose to also become college football head coaches.

== Early years ==
Helton was born in Pensacola, Florida. He attended Gainesville High School and the University of Florida in Gainesville, Florida, where he played center for coach Ray Graves' Florida Gators football team from 1967 to 1969. He graduated from Florida with a bachelor's degree in physical education in 1970.

== Coaching career ==
Helton began his coaching career as head coach at Eastside High School in Gainesville in 1970. After two seasons there, Helton became a graduate assistant at the University of Florida in 1972. Later, Helton became the offensive line coach under new Gators head coach Doug Dickey, a position he held from 1973 to 1978. In 1979, he was hired by Howard Schnellenberger to serve as the offensive coordinator for the Miami Hurricanes.

In 1982 Helton moved to the National Football League (NFL), becoming offensive line coach under head coaches John McKay and Leeman Bennett with the Tampa Bay Buccaneers. He later held similar positions with the Houston Oilers and Los Angeles Raiders. In early 1993, Helton agreed to join the Miami Dolphins as offensive line coach, but was offered the head coaching position at the University of Houston before starting with the Dolphins.

In seven years at Houston, Helton had two winning seasons and one bowl game appearance. He was fired in November 1999, after a 7–4 season. After a few years out of coaching, Helton was hired by fellow Florida alumnus Steve Spurrier to coach the Washington Redskins offensive line. After Spurrier's dismissal as Redskins head coach in 2003, Helton became the running backs coach for the CFL's Toronto Argonauts. In January 2007, he was hired as offensive coordinator at UAB by Neil Callaway who had served as offensive coordinator himself under Helton at Houston. Callaway and his staff were fired following the 2011 season.

After Helton's son, Tyson Helton, was named head football coach at Western Kentucky University, he joined the coaching staff as an offensive analyst in the spring of 2019.

Helton was inducted in the University of Florida Athletic Hall of Fame as a "Distinguished Letter Winner" in 2001.

== Head coaching record ==
Year	Team	Overall	Conference	Standing	Bowl/playoffs
Houston Cougars (Southwest Conference) (1993–1995)
1993	Houston	1–9–1	1–5–1	T–7th	
1994	Houston	1–10	1–6	6th	
1995	Houston	2–9	2–5	5th	
Houston Cougars (Conference USA) (1996–1999)
1996	Houston	7–5	4–1	T–1st	L Liberty
1997	Houston	3–8	2–4	T–4th	
1998	Houston	3–8	2–4	T–5th	
1999	Houston	7–4	3–3	6th	
Houston:		24–53–1	15–28–1		
Total:		24–53–1			
National championship Conference title Conference division title or championship game berth

== See also ==
- List of University of Florida alumni
- List of University of Florida Athletic Hall of Fame members
