= 1996 Houston Cougars football team =

American college football season

1996 Houston Cougars football

C-USA co-champion

Liberty Bowl, L 17–30 vs. Syracuse
- Conference: Conference USA
- Record: 7–5 (4–1 C-USA)
- Head coach: Kim Helton (4th season)
- Offensive coordinator: Neil Callaway (4th season)
- Offensive scheme: Pro-style
- Defensive coordinator: Gene Smith (4th season)
- Base defense: 4–3
- Captains: Gary Haynes; Antowain Smith; Charles West
- Home stadium: Houston Astrodome; Robertson Stadium

1996 Conference USA football standings
	Conf.			Overall
Team	W		L	W		L
Houston +	4	–	1	7	–	5
Southern Miss +	4	–	1	8	–	3
Cincinnati	2	–	3	6	–	5
Louisville	2	–	3	5	–	6
Memphis	2	–	3	4	–	7
Tulane	1	–	4	2	–	9
+ – Conference co-champions; Rankings from AP Poll

The 1996 Houston Cougars football team, also known as the Houston Cougars, Houston, or UH represented the University of Houston in the 1996 NCAA Division I-A football season. It was the 51st year of season play for Houston and the first season as a member of Conference USA following the breakup of the Southwest Conference. The team was coached by Kim Helton. The team split its home games between the Houston Astrodome and Robertson Stadium. The Cougars became inaugural conference champions and were invited to the 1996 Liberty Bowl, their first bowl game since 1988. Houston won their conference for the first time since 1984.

== Schedule ==
Houston did not play Rice for the first time since 1970.

Date	Time	Opponent	Site	TV	Result	Attendance	Source
August 31		Sam Houston State*	Robertson Stadium; Houston TX		W 43–25	14,110	
September 7	7:00 pm	at No. 17 LSU*	Tiger Stadium; Baton Rouge, LA		L 34–35	80,303	
September 14	6:00 pm	at Pittsburgh*	Pitt Stadium; Pittsburgh, PA		W 42–35 ^{OT}	27,648	
September 21	2:30 pm	No. 15 USC*	Houston Astrodome; Houston, TX	FOX	L 9–26	21,035	
October 5		at Southwestern Louisiana*	Cajun Field; Lafayette, LA		W 31–24	18,247	
October 12	7:00 pm	Memphis	Houston Astrodome; Houston, TX		W 37–20	15,553	
October 19		at Cincinnati	Nippert Stadium; Cincinnati, Ohio		L 20–31	19,064	
October 26	5:30 pm	No. 9 North Carolina*	Houston Astrodome; Houston, TX	FOX Sports Net	L 14–42	16,850	
November 2		at Tulane	Louisiana Superdome; New Orleans, LA		W 20–17	14,474	
November 9		No. 20 Southern Miss^{†}	Robertson Stadium; Houston, TX		W 56–49	18,107	
November 16		Louisville	Houston Astrodome; Houston, TX	FOX Sports Net	W 38–7	19,651	
December 27	2:00 pm	vs. No. 23 Syracuse*	Liberty Bowl Memorial Stadium; Memphis, TN (Liberty Bowl)	ESPN	L 17–30	49,163	
*Non-conference game; ^{†}Homecoming; Rankings from AP Poll released prior to the game

== Roster ==
1996 Houston Cougars football team roster
Players
Coaches
Offense

Pos.	#	Name	Class
QB	12	Chuck Clements	Sr
C	66	Ben Fricke	Jr
RB	23	Antowain Smith	Sr
WR	84	Justin Davis	So
QB	15	Tyson Helton	Fr
WR	32	Halley Spencer	Fr
OT	79	Marcus Spriggs	Sr
G	78	Justin Stille	Fr
QB	13	Brian Thiebaud	Fr
WR	6	Charles West	Sr
RB	34	Jermaine Williams	Sr

Defense

Pos.	#	Name	Class
LB	46	John Autenreith	Sr
LB	48	Keon Banks	Jr
DE	90	Adriano Belli	Fr
DT	60	Matthew Elam	So
DT	99	Delondo Fields	Jr
CB	35	William Fields	Fr
LB	25	Freddie Fisher	So
SS	24	Stedmon Forman	So
DE	93	Rusty Foster	Jr

Special teams

Pos.	#	Name	Class
KS	97	Sebastian Villarreal	Jr

Head coach

- Kim Helton

Coordinators/assistant coaches

Legend

- (C) Team captain
- (S) Suspended
- (I) Ineligible
- Injured
- Redshirt

Roster
