= 1999 UAB Blazers football team =

American college football season

1999 UAB Blazers football
- Conference: Conference USA
- Record: 5–6 (4–2 C-USA)
- Head coach: Watson Brown (5th season)
- Offensive coordinator: Pat Sullivan (1st season)
- Offensive scheme: Multiple
- Defensive coordinator: Bill Clay (3rd season)
- Base defense: 4–3
- Home stadium: Legion Field

1999 Conference USA football standings
	Conf.			Overall
Team	W		L	W		L
No. 14 Southern Miss $	6	–	0	9	–	3
East Carolina	4	–	2	9	–	3
Louisville	4	–	2	7	–	5
UAB	4	–	2	5	–	6
Memphis	4	–	2	5	–	6
Houston	3	–	3	7	–	4
Army	1	–	5	3	–	8
Tulane	1	–	5	3	–	8
Cincinnati	0	–	6	3	–	8
$ – Conference champion; Rankings from AP Poll

The 1999 UAB Blazers football team represented the University of Alabama at Birmingham (UAB) as a member of the Conference USA (C-USA) during the 1999 NCAA Division I-A football season. Led by fifth-year head coach Watson Brown, the Blazers compiled an overall record of 5–6 with a mark of 4–2 in conference play, placing in a four-way tie for second in C-USA. UAB played home games at Legion Field in Birmingham, Alabama.

The 1999 season was UAB's first as a member of a conference.

== Schedule ==
Date	Time	Opponent	Site	TV	Result	Attendance	Source
September 4	2:30 p.m.	at Missouri*	Faurot Field; Columbia, MO	FSN	L 28–31	50,356	
September 11	1:00 p.m.	at No. 11 Virginia Tech*	Lane Stadium; Blacksburg, VA		L 10–31	51,907	
September 25	6:00 p.m.	Houston	Legion Field; Birmingham, AL		W 29–10	28,573	
October 2	6:00 p.m.	Louisiana–Monroe*	Legion Field; Birmingham, AL		W 47–0	18,762	
October 9	6:00 p.m.	Memphis^{†}	Legion Field; Birmingham, AL (Battle for the Bones)		L 14–38	18,176	
October 16	2:30 p.m.	at Cincinnati	Nippert Stadium; Cincinnati, OH		W 24–21 ^{OT}	17,033	
October 23	2:30 p.m.	at Wake Forest*	Groves Stadium; Winston-Salem, NC		L 3–47	20,578	
October 30	1:00 p.m.	at Louisville	Papa John's Cardinal Stadium; Louisville, KY		L 14–23	34,786	
November 6	1:00 p.m.	No. 17 East Carolina	Legion Field; Birmingham, AL		W 36–17	18,062	
November 13	1:00 p.m.	Louisiana Tech*	Legion Field; Birmingham, AL		L 20–41	18,672	
November 20	5:00 p.m.	at Tulane	Louisiana Superdome; New Orleans, LA		W 23–20 ^{OT}	18,592	
*Non-conference game; ^{†}Homecoming; Rankings from AP Poll released prior to the game; All times are in Central time
