= 1996 Louisville Cardinals football team =

American college football season

1996 Louisville Cardinals football
- Conference: Conference USA
- Record: 5–6 (2–3 C–USA)
- Head coach: Ron Cooper (2nd season)
- Offensive coordinator: Bret Ingalls (2nd season)
- Defensive coordinator: Everett Withers (2nd season)
- Home stadium: Cardinal Stadium

1996 Conference USA football standings
	Conf.			Overall
Team	W		L	W		L
Houston +	4	–	1	7	–	5
Southern Miss +	4	–	1	8	–	3
Cincinnati	2	–	3	6	–	5
Louisville	2	–	3	5	–	6
Memphis	2	–	3	4	–	7
Tulane	1	–	4	2	–	9
+ – Conference co-champions; Rankings from AP Poll

The 1996 Louisville Cardinals football team represented the University of Louisville as a member of the newly-formed Conference USA (C-USA) during the 1996 NCAA Division I-A football season. Led by second-year head coach Ron Cooper, the Cardinals compiled an overall record of 5–6 with a mark of 2–3 in conference play, placing in a three-way tie for third in C-USA. The team played home games in Cardinal Stadium in Louisville, Kentucky.

== Schedule ==
Date	Time	Opponent	Site	TV	Result	Attendance	Source
August 31	6:30 pm	at Kentucky*	Commonwealth Stadium; Lexington, KY (Governor's Cup)		W 38–14	59,384	
September 7	3:30 pm	at No. 7 Penn State*	Beaver Stadium; University Park, PA	ABC	L 7–24	95,670	
September 14	3:30 pm	Baylor*	Cardinal Stadium; Louisville, KY	FSN	L 13–14	38,756	
September 21	1:00 pm	at Michigan State*	Spartan Stadium; East Lansing, MI		W 30–20	70,311	
September 28		Southern Miss	Cardinal Stadium; Louisville, KY		L 7–24	36,462	
October 12		at Tulane	Louisiana Superdome; New Orleans, LA		W 23–20	17,561	
October 19	2:00 pm	Northern Illinois	Cardinal Stadium; Louisville, KY		W 27–3	36,467	
October 26		Cincinnati	Cardinal Stadium; Louisville, KY (The Keg of Nails)		L 7–10		
November 2		Memphis	Cardinal Stadium; Louisville, KY (rivalry)		W 13–10	33,512	
November 9	1:30 pm	at No. 8 North Carolina*	Kenan Memorial Stadium; Chapel Hill, NC		L 10–28	46,000	
November 16		at Houston	Houston Astrodome; Houston, TX		L 7–38	19,651	
*Non-conference game; Rankings from AP Poll released prior to the game; All times are in Central time

== Roster ==
1996 Louisville Cardinals football team roster
Players
Coaches
Offense

Pos.	#	Name	Class
QB	7	Chris Redman	Fr

Defense

Pos.	#	Name	Class
CB	13	Sam Madison	Sr
LB	52	Tyrus McCloud	Sr
DE	51	Carl Powell	Sr

Special teams

Pos.	#	Name	Class

Head coach

- Ron Cooper

Coordinators/assistant coaches

Legend

- (C) Team captain
- (S) Suspended
- (I) Ineligible
- Injured
- Redshirt
