= 1996 Liberty Bowl =

1996 St. Jude Liberty Bowl
- 38th Liberty Bowl
Houston Cougars	Syracuse Orangemen
(7–4)	(8–3)
C-USA	Big East
17	30
Head coach: Kim Helton	Head coach: Paul Pasqualoni
	AP / Coaches / BA; 23 / 22 / 23
	1	2	3	4	Total
Houston	7	7	0	3	17
Syracuse	7	9	0	14	30
- Date: December 27, 1996
- Season: 1996
- Stadium: Liberty Bowl Memorial Stadium
- Location: Memphis, Tennessee
- MVP: Malcolm Thomas, Syracuse RB
- Attendance: 49,163

United States TV coverage
- Network: ESPN
- Announcers: Craig Bolerjack and Rod Gilmore

The 1996 Liberty Bowl was a college football bowl game played on December 27, 1996, in Memphis, Tennessee. The 38th edition of the Liberty Bowl, it matched the Houston Cougars and the Syracuse Orangemen.

== Background ==
Syracuse, who had finished as co-champion of the Big East Conference (alongside Virginia Tech and Miami, who went to the Orange and Carquest Bowls, respectively), was invited to play in the Liberty Bowl, their first Liberty Bowl since 1961. This was their fifth bowl game in the decade, and 8th in the past 10 seasons. As for Houston, they had finished as co-champion of Conference USA (along with Southern Miss) in the inaugural year of the conference. This was their first bowl game since 1988.

== Game summary ==
The game found two future first rounders and Super Bowl participants: Syracuse's Donovan McNabb and Houston's Antowain Smith. Although only completing four of ten pass attempts, McNabb rushed for 49 yards and two touchdowns. Smith rushed for 119 yards and a touchdown, as well as receiving for 44 yards and a touchdown. Orangemen running back Malcolm Thomas ran for 201 yards and a touchdown earning MVP honors.

== Scoring summary ==
- Syracuse – Donovan McNabb 1 yard touchdown run (Trout kick) – 13:16 remaining in the 1st quarter
- Houston – Justin Davis 21 yard touchdown pass from Chuck Clements (Villarreal kick) – 11:48 remaining in the 1st quarter
- Syracuse – Rob Konrad 2 yard touchdown run (Trout kick) – 9:02 remaining in the 2nd quarter
- Syracuse – Team safety (snap sailed over the head of punter Ignacio Sauceda, landing in the end zone) – 3:58 remaining in the 2nd quarter
- Houston – Justin Davis 3 yard touchdown run (Villarreal kick) – 0:30 remaining in the 2nd quarter
- Syracuse – Donovan McNabb 2 yard touchdown run (Trout kick) – 13:52 remaining in the 4th quarter
- Houston – Sebastian Villarreal 23 yard field goal – 10:50 remaining in the 4th quarter
- Syracuse – Malcolm Thomas 6 yard touchdown run (Trout kick) – 5:29 remaining in the 4th quarter

== Statistics ==
Statistics	Houston	Syracuse
First downs	13	25
Rushing yards	124	396
Passing yards	217	76
Passing (C–A–I)	14–28–1	4–10–0
Total offense	341	472
Return yards	148	80
Punts–average	3–35.0	4–42.5
Fumbles–lost	0–0	0–0
Third-down conversions	3–11	9–15
Penalties–yards	5–30	5–41
Time of possession	21:59	38:01
