= 1996 Cincinnati Bearcats football team =

American college football season

1996 Cincinnati Bearcats football
- Conference: Conference USA
- Record: 6–5 (2–3 C-USA)
- Head coach: Rick Minter (3rd season)
- Offensive coordinator: Greg Seamon (2nd season)
- Offensive scheme: Pro-style
- Defensive coordinator: Rex Ryan (1st season)
- Base defense: 3–4 or 4–3
- Home stadium: Nippert Stadium

1996 Conference USA football standings
	Conf.			Overall
Team	W		L	W		L
Houston +	4	–	1	7	–	5
Southern Miss +	4	–	1	8	–	3
Cincinnati	2	–	3	6	–	5
Louisville	2	–	3	5	–	6
Memphis	2	–	3	4	–	7
Tulane	1	–	4	2	–	9
+ – Conference co-champions; Rankings from AP Poll

The 1996 Cincinnati Bearcats football team represented University of Cincinnati during 1996 NCAA Division I-A football season.

== Schedule ==
Date	Opponent	Site	Result	Attendance	Source
August 30	Tulane	Nippert Stadium; Cincinnati, OH	L 14–34	26,493	
September 7	Kentucky*	Nippert Stadium; Cincinnati, OH	W 24–3	30,729	
September 14	at Kansas State*	KSU Stadium; Manhattan, KS	L 0–35	43,111	
September 28	Miami (OH)*	Nippert Stadium; Cincinnati, OH (Victory Bell)	W 30–23		
October 5	at Memphis	Liberty Bowl Memorial Stadium; Memphis, TN (rivalry)	L 16–18	19,511	
October 12	Boston College*	Nippert Stadium; Cincinnati, OH	L 17–24	20,673	
October 19	Houston	Nippert Stadium; Cincinnati, OH	W 31–20	19,064	
October 26	at Louisville	Cardinal Stadium; Louisville, KY (The Keg of Nails)	W 10–7		
November 2	at Southern Miss	M. M. Roberts Stadium; Hattiesburg, MS	L 17–21	25,241	
November 16	at UAB*	Legion Field; Birmingham, AL	W 34–14	15,000	
November 23	Northeast Louisiana*	Nippert Stadium; Cincinnati, OH	W 35–13	17,686	
*Non-conference game

== Roster ==
1996 Cincinnati Bearcats football team roster
Players
Coaches
Offense

Pos.	#	Name	Class
OT	78	Pierre Brilliant	Jr
G	68	Robert Robinson	Sr
C	75	Brian Uhl	So
G	61	Joel Dolinski	Jr
OT	67	Jason Fabini	Jr
TE	88	Josh Anderson	So
QB	4	Chad Plummer	So
RB	20	Orlando Smith	Jr
FB	36	Landon Smith	Jr
WR	18	Anthony Ladd	Sr
WR	2	Robert Tate	Sr

Defense

Pos.	#	Name	Class
DE	53	Terry Grooms	Sr
DT	95	Derrick Ransom	Jr
DT	99	John Kabolka	Jr
DE	91	Darrius Felder	Sr
OLB	3	Brad Jackson	Jr
MLB	45	Phil Curry	Jr
OLB	48	Hassan Champion	Jr
CB	6	Jermaine Trent	Sr
FS	9	Chris Hewitt	Sr
SS	7	Sam Garnes	Sr
CB	21	Artrell Hawkins	Jr

Special teams

Pos.	#	Name	Class

Head coach

- Rick Minter

Coordinators/assistant coaches

- Kim Dameron (Defensive backs)

Legend

- (C) Team captain
- (S) Suspended
- (I) Ineligible
- Injured
- Redshirt

Roster
