= 1999 Liberty Bowl =

1999 AXA Liberty Bowl
- 41st Liberty Bowl
Colorado State Rams	Southern Miss Golden Eagles
(8–3)	(8-3)
Mountain West	C-USA
17	23
Head coach: Sonny Lubick	Head coach: Jeff Bower
	AP / Coaches; 16 / 14
	1	2	3	4	Total
Colorado State	3	14	0	0	17
Southern Miss	13	7	3	0	23
- Date: December 31, 1999
- Season: 1999
- Stadium: Liberty Bowl Memorial Stadium
- Location: Memphis, Tennessee
- MVP: Adalius Thomas (DE, Southern Miss)
- Referee: Jack Childress (ACC)
- Attendance: 56,570

United States TV coverage
- Network: ESPN
- Announcers: Steve Levy, Todd Christensen, and Holly Rowe

The 1999 Liberty Bowl was a college football postseason bowl game played on December 31, 1999, at Liberty Bowl Memorial Stadium in Memphis, Tennessee. The 41st edition of the Liberty Bowl matched the Colorado State Rams and the Southern Miss Golden Eagles. The game was sponsored by the Axa Equitable Life Insurance Company and was branded as the AXA Liberty Bowl. Southern Miss won the game 23–17; the game was highlighted by Southern Miss's strong defense, which scored two touchdowns and held Colorado State scoreless in the second half.
