= 1996 Memphis Tigers football team =

American college football season

1996 Memphis Tigers football
- Conference: Conference USA
- Record: 4–7 (2–3 C-USA)
- Head coach: Rip Scherer (2nd season)
- Offensive coordinator: Sparky Woods (2nd season)
- Defensive coordinator: Jim Pletcher (2nd season)
- Home stadium: Liberty Bowl Memorial Stadium

1996 Conference USA football standings
	Conf.			Overall
Team	W		L	W		L
Houston +	4	–	1	7	–	5
Southern Miss +	4	–	1	8	–	3
Cincinnati	2	–	3	6	–	5
Louisville	2	–	3	5	–	6
Memphis	2	–	3	4	–	7
Tulane	1	–	4	2	–	9
+ – Conference co-champions; Rankings from AP Poll

The 1996 Memphis Tigers football team represented the University of Memphis in the 1996 NCAA Division I-A football season. Memphis competed as a member of Conference USA. The team was led by head coach Rip Scherer. The Tigers played their home games at the Liberty Bowl Memorial Stadium.

== Schedule ==
Date	Opponent	Site	TV	Result	Attendance	Source
August 31	No. 11 Miami (FL)*	Liberty Bowl Memorial Stadium; Memphis, TN	SUN	L 7–30	32,096	
September 7	Mississippi State*	Liberty Bowl Memorial Stadium; Memphis, TN		L 10–31	38,388	
September 14	at Missouri*	Faurot Field; Columbia, MO		W 19–16	41,543	
September 21	Tulane	Liberty Bowl Memorial Stadium; Memphis, TN		W 17–10	27,386	
October 5	Cincinnati^{†}	Liberty Bowl Memorial Stadium; Memphis, TN (rivalry)		W 18–16	19,511	
October 12	at Houston	Robertson Stadium; Houston, TX		L 20–37	19,064	
October 19	at Southern Miss	M. M. Roberts Stadium; Hattiesburg, MS (Black and Blue Bowl)		L 18–42	17,243	
October 26	at Southwestern Louisiana*	Cajun Field; Lafayette, LA		L 9–13	10,555	
November 2	Louisville	Cardinal Stadium; Louisville, KY (rivalry)		L 10–13	33,512	
November 9	No. 6 Tennessee*	Liberty Bowl Memorial Stadium; Memphis, TN	CBS	W 21–17	65,685	
November 23	East Carolina*	Liberty Bowl Memorial Stadium; Memphis, TN		L 10–20	25,059	
*Non-conference game; ^{†}Homecoming; Rankings from AP Poll released prior to the game
