= 1999 Tulane Green Wave football team =

American college football season

1999 Tulane Green Wave football
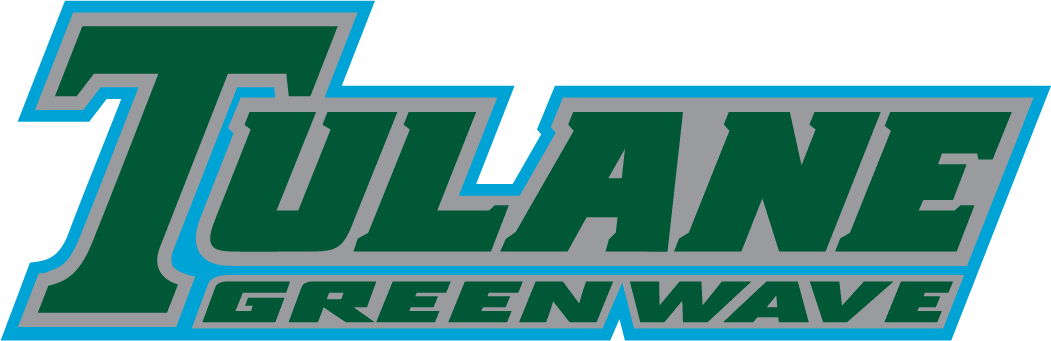
- Conference: Conference USA
- Record: 3–8 (1–5 C-USA)
- Head coach: Chris Scelfo (1st season)
- Offensive scheme: Multiple
- Defensive coordinator: Pete McGinnis (1st season)
- Base defense: 4–3
- Home stadium: Louisiana Superdome

1999 Conference USA football standings
	Conf.			Overall
Team	W		L	W		L
No. 14 Southern Miss $	6	–	0	9	–	3
East Carolina	4	–	2	9	–	3
Louisville	4	–	2	7	–	5
UAB	4	–	2	5	–	6
Memphis	4	–	2	5	–	6
Houston	3	–	3	7	–	4
Army	1	–	5	3	–	8
Tulane	1	–	5	3	–	8
Cincinnati	0	–	6	3	–	8
$ – Conference champion; Rankings from AP Poll

The 1999 Tulane Green Wave football team represented Tulane University in the 1999 NCAA Division I-A football season. The Green Wave played their home games at the Louisiana Superdome. They competed in Conference USA. The team was coached by head coach Chris Scelfo.

== Schedule ==
Date	Time	Opponent	Site	TV	Result	Attendance	Source
September 6	2:00 pm	at Southern Miss	M. M. Roberts Stadium; Hattiesburg, MS (Battle for the Bell)	FSN	L 14–48	30,098	
September 11	5:00 pm	SMU*	Louisiana Superdome; New Orleans, LA		W 53–19	20,097	
September 18	5:00 pm	Army	Louisiana Superdome; New Orleans, LA		W 48–28	22,277	
October 2	12:30 pm	at No. 22 Syracuse*	Carrier Dome; Syracuse, NY		L 17–47	48,286	
October 9	1:00 pm	at Ole Miss*	Vaught–Hemingway Stadium; Oxford, MS		L 13–20	40,914	
October 16	2:30 pm	Louisiana–Lafayette*^{†}	Louisiana Superdome; New Orleans, LA		W 48–32	24,407	
October 23	3:00 pm	at East Carolina	Dowdy–Ficklen Stadium; Greenville, NC	FSN	L 7–52	35,021	
October 30	5:00 pm	Memphis	Louisiana Superdome; New Orleans, LA		L 7–49	17,847	
November 6	2:30 pm	at Houston	Robertson Stadium; Houston, TX		L 31–36	16,008	
November 13	11:00 am	at Navy*	Navy–Marine Corps Memorial Stadium; Annapolis, MD	WNOL	L 21–45	32,840	
November 20	5:00 pm	UAB	Louisiana Superdome; New Orleans, LA		L 20–23 ^{OT}	18,592	
*Non-conference game; ^{†}Homecoming; Rankings from AP Poll released prior to the game; All times are in Central time

== Roster ==
1999 Tulane Green Wave football team roster
Players
Coaches
Offense

Pos.	#	Name	Class
QB	7	Patrick Ramsey	So
WR	20	JaJuan Dawson	Sr
OL	60	Seth Zaunbrecher	Fr
OT	74	Bernard Robertson	Jr

Defense

Pos.	#	Name	Class
DB	3	Jeff Sanchez	Fr
S	13	Burl Burns	Fr
DB	14	Adrian Mitchell	Fr
CB	15	Tim Carter	Jr
DE	58	Cory Green	Jr
DT	59	Ryan Brewer	So

Special teams

Pos.	#	Name	Class
K	47	Seth Marler	Fr
P	36	Casey Roussel	So

Head coach

- Chris Scelfo

Coordinators/assistant coaches

Legend

- (C) Team captain
- (S) Suspended
- (I) Ineligible
- Injured
- Redshirt

Roster
Last update: 1999-10-06

== Team players in the NFL ==
Player	Position	Round	Pick	NFL club
JaJuan Dawson	Wide Receiver	3	79	Cleveland Browns
