= 1996 Tulane Green Wave football team =

American college football season

1996 Tulane Green Wave football
- Conference: Conference USA
- Record: 2–9 (1–4 C-USA)
- Head coach: Buddy Teevens (5th season)
- Offensive coordinator: Frank Monica (2nd as OC, 10th overall season)
- Defensive coordinator: Vic Eumont (3rd season)
- Home stadium: Louisiana Superdome

1996 Conference USA football standings
	Conf.			Overall
Team	W		L	W		L
Houston +	4	–	1	7	–	5
Southern Miss +	4	–	1	8	–	3
Cincinnati	2	–	3	6	–	5
Louisville	2	–	3	5	–	6
Memphis	2	–	3	4	–	7
Tulane	1	–	4	2	–	9
+ – Conference co-champions; Rankings from AP Poll

The 1996 Tulane Green Wave football team was an American football team that represented Tulane University during the 1996 NCAA Division I-A football season as a member of Conference USA. In their fifth year under head coach Buddy Teevens, the team compiled an overall record of 2–9, with a mark of 1–4 in conference play, placing sixth in C-USA.

== Schedule ==
Date	Opponent	Site	Result	Attendance	Source
August 30	at Cincinnati	Nippert Stadium; Cincinnati, OH	W 34–14	26,493	
September 14	Rice*	Louisiana Superdome; New Orleans, LA	L 14–21	38,839	
September 21	at Memphis	Liberty Bowl Memorial Stadium; Memphis, TN	L 10–17	27,386	
October 5	TCU*	Louisiana Superdome; New Orleans, LA	W 35–7	14,341	
October 12	Louisville	Louisiana Superdome; New Orleans, LA	L 20–23	17,561	
October 19	at Army*	Michie Stadium; West Point, NY	L 10–34	35,971	
October 26	No. 24 Southern Miss	Louisiana Superdome; New Orleans, LA (rivalry)	L 28–31	20,394	
November 2	Houston	Louisiana Superdome; New Orleans, LA	L 17–20	14,474	
November 9	No. 24 Syracuse*	Louisiana Superdome; New Orleans, LA	L 7–31	13,537	
November 16	at Navy*	Navy–Marine Corps Memorial Stadium; Annapolis, MD	L 21–35	24,952	
November 23	at No. 18 LSU*	Tiger Stadium; Baton Rouge, LA (Battle for the Rag)	L 17–35	78,966	
*Non-conference game; Rankings from AP Poll released prior to the game

== Roster ==
1996 Tulane Green Wave football team roster
Players
Coaches
Offense

Pos.	#	Name	Class
WR	2	Jeff Liggon	Sr
WR	7	Derrick Franklin	Sr
WR	8	P. J. Franklin	So
QB	10	Shaun King	So
QB	14	Jeff Curtis	So
WR	20	JaJuan Dawson	Fr
TB	33	Jerald Sowell	Sr
G	63	Chris Anderson	Fr
WR	82	Jon Donohue	Jr
TE	85	Cory Geason	Jr

Defense

Pos.	#	Name	Class
CB	1	Alphonso Roundtree	So
CB	4	Tellius Carr	So
S	5	Elijah Freeman	Sr
CB	6	Michael Jordan	So
MLB	50	Brain Williams	Jr
DT	65	Dennis O'Sullivan	So
DE	96	Brent Hamilton	Fr
DT	97	Mitch Mouton	Fr
DE	98	Shane Marshall	Jr
DT	99	Terence Cook	Jr

Special teams

Pos.	#	Name	Class
K	3	Brad Palazzo	So
H	14	Jeff Curtis	So

Head coach

- Buddy Teevens

Coordinators/assistant coaches

Legend

- (C) Team captain
- (S) Suspended
- (I) Ineligible
- Injured
- Redshirt

Roster
Last update: 1997-05-02
