= 1999 Cincinnati Bearcats football team =

American college football season

1999 Cincinnati Bearcats football
- Conference: Conference USA
- Record: 3–8 (0–6 C-USA)
- Head coach: Rick Minter (6th season)
- Offensive coordinator: Jimbo Fisher (1st season)
- Offensive scheme: Pro-style
- Defensive coordinator: Rick Smith (1st season)
- Base defense: 4–3
- Home stadium: Nippert Stadium

1999 Conference USA football standings
	Conf.			Overall
Team	W		L	W		L
No. 14 Southern Miss $	6	–	0	9	–	3
East Carolina	4	–	2	9	–	3
Louisville	4	–	2	7	–	5
UAB	4	–	2	5	–	6
Memphis	4	–	2	5	–	6
Houston	3	–	3	7	–	4
Army	1	–	5	3	–	8
Tulane	1	–	5	3	–	8
Cincinnati	0	–	6	3	–	8
$ – Conference champion; Rankings from AP Poll

The 1999 Cincinnati Bearcats football team represented the University of Cincinnati in the 1999 NCAA Division I-A football season. The team, coached by Rick Minter, played their home games in Nippert Stadium, as it has since 1924.

== Schedule ==
Date	Time	Opponent	Site	TV	Result	Attendance	Source
September 4	4:30 p.m.	Kent State*	Nippert Stadium; Cincinnati, OH		W 41–3	17,210	
September 11		No. 10 (I-AA) Troy State*	Nippert Stadium; Cincinnati, OH		L 24–31	16,091	
September 18	2:16 p.m.	No. 9 Wisconsin*	Nippert Stadium; Cincinnati, OH	FSN	W 17–12	27,721	
September 25	12:00 p.m.	at No. 12 Ohio State*	Ohio Stadium; Columbus, OH	ESPN Plus	L 20–34	93,407	
October 9	2:30 p.m.	at Houston	Robertson Stadium; Houston, TX		L 20–23	22,315	
October 16		UAB	Nippert Stadium; Cincinnati, OH	ESPN Plus	L 21–24 ^{OT}	17,033	
October 23		at No. 21 Southern Miss	M. M. Roberts Stadium; Hattiesburg, MS		L 20–28	24,012	
October 30	12:30 p.m.	at Miami (OH)*	Yager Stadium; Oxford, OH (Victory Bell)		W 52–42	22,469	
November 6	3:30 p.m.	Louisville	Nippert Stadium; Cincinnati, OH (The Keg of Nails)	FSN	L 13–23	26,399	
November 13	3:30 p.m.	at No. 24 East Carolina	Dowdy–Ficklen Stadium; Greenville, NC		L 34–48	33,912	
November 20	3:30 p.m.	Memphis	Nippert Stadium; Cincinnati, OH (rivalry)		L 13–21	14,058	
*Non-conference game; Rankings from AP Poll released prior to the game; All times are in Eastern time

== Roster ==
1999 Cincinnati Bearcats football team roster
Players
Coaches
Offense

Pos.	#	Name	Class
G	66	Ken Biggs	Sr
WR	1	Antonio Chatman	Jr
WR	2	Jason Collins-Baker	Jr
RB	33	Robert Cooper	Sr
WR	3	Tye Keith	Fr
QB	7	Deontey Kenner	Jr
G	70	Jason Lisek	Jr
OT	77	Mike Love	Jr
C	50	Doug Rosfeld	Jr
WR	81	Tim Walker	So

Defense

Pos.	#	Name	Class
CB	8	Jeff Burrow	Sr
LB	48	Troy Evans	Jr
FS	22	DeJuan Gossett	Jr
CB	4	LaVar Glover	So
SS	21	Frank Lang	Fr
DE	98	Greg Lee	Jr
CB	31	Melvin Lewis	So
LB	59	Clarence Lindsey	Jr
DT	90	Mario Monds	Jr
LB	83	Antwan Peek	So

Special teams

Pos.	#	Name	Class
K	13	Joe Judge	Sr
LS	53	Chad Vordem Esche	Jr

Head coach

- Rick Minter

Coordinators/assistant coaches

Legend

- (C) Team captain
- (S) Suspended
- (I) Ineligible
- Injured
- Redshirt

Roster
