= 1999 Memphis Tigers football team =

American college football season

1999 Memphis Tigers football
- Conference: Conference USA
- Record: 5–6 (4–3 C-USA)
- Head coach: Rip Scherer (5th season)
- Co-offensive coordinators: Rusty Burns (3rd season); Mac McWhorter (1st season)
- Defensive coordinator: John Thompson (1st season)
- Home stadium: Liberty Bowl Memorial Stadium

1999 Conference USA football standings
	Conf.			Overall
Team	W		L	W		L
No. 14 Southern Miss $	6	–	0	9	–	3
East Carolina	4	–	2	9	–	3
Louisville	4	–	2	7	–	5
UAB	4	–	2	5	–	6
Memphis	4	–	2	5	–	6
Houston	3	–	3	7	–	4
Army	1	–	5	3	–	8
Tulane	1	–	5	3	–	8
Cincinnati	0	–	6	3	–	8
$ – Conference champion; Rankings from AP Poll

The 1999 Memphis Tigers football team represented the University of Memphis in the 1999 NCAA Division I-A football season. Memphis competed as a member of the Conference USA and were coached by Rip Scherer. The Tigers played their home games at the Liberty Bowl Memorial Stadium.

== Schedule ==
Date	Time	Opponent	Site	TV	Result	Attendance	Source
September 4	7:00 pm	Ole Miss*	Liberty Bowl Memorial Stadium; Memphis, TN (rivalry)		L 0–3	57,523	
September 11	7:30 pm	at Mississippi State*	Scott Field; Starkville, MS	FSN	L 10–13	32,010	
September 18	7:00 pm	Arkansas State*	Liberty Bowl Memorial Stadium; Memphis, TN (Paint Bucket Bowl)		W 31–26	21,454	
September 25	3:00 pm	at No. 7 Tennessee*	Neyland Stadium; Knoxville, TN	PPV	L 16–17	107,261	
October 2	2:30 pm	Missouri*	Liberty Bowl Memorial Stadium; Memphis, TN	FSN	L 17–27	29,248	
October 9	6:00 pm	at UAB	Legion Field; Birmingham, AL (Battle for the Bones)		W 38–14	18,176	
October 16	7:00 pm	Louisville	Liberty Bowl Memorial Stadium; Memphis, TN (rivalry)		L 31–32	30,315	
October 30	5:00 pm	at Tulane	Louisiana Superdome; New Orleans, LA		W 49–7	17,847	
November 6	2:00 pm	No. 25 Southern Miss	Liberty Bowl Memorial Stadium; Memphis, TN (Black and Blue Bowl)	FSN	L 5–20	23,635	
November 13	1:00 pm	Army	Liberty Bowl Memorial Stadium; Memphis, TN		W 14–10	22,869	
November 20	3:30 pm	at Cincinnati	Nippert Stadium; Cincinnati, OH (rivalry)		W 21–13	14,058	
*Non-conference game; Rankings from AP Poll released prior to the game; All times are in Central time
