= Perry Phenix =

American football player (born 1974)

No. 35, 20
- Position: Safety

Personal information
- Born: November 14, 1974 (age 51); Monroe, Louisiana, U.S.
- Listed height: 5 ft 11 in (1.80 m)
- Listed weight: 210 lb (95 kg)

Career information
- High school: Hillcrest (Dallas, Texas)
- College: Trinity Valley CC (1994-1995) Southern Miss (1996–1997)
- NFL draft: 1998: undrafted

Career history
- Tennessee Oilers/Titans (1998–2000); Carolina Panthers (2001); Cleveland Browns (2001); Tennessee Titans (2001); Atlanta Falcons (2002)*
- * Offseason or practice squad member only

Career NFL statistics
- Tackles: 192
- Interceptions: 1
- Fumble recoveries: 2
- Stats at Pro Football Reference

Perry Lee Phenix (born November 14, 1974) is an American former professional football player who was a safety for the Tennessee Oilers/Titans and the Carolina Panthers of the National Football League (NFL). He played college football for the Southern Miss Golden Eagles.
