= Houston Cougars football =

Football team of the University of Houston

2026 Houston Cougars football team
- First season: 1946; 80 years ago
- Athletic director: Eddie Nuñez
- Head coach: Willie Fritz; 3rd season, 22–14 (.611)
- Location: Houston, Texas
- Stadium: TDECU Stadium (capacity: 40,000)
- Field: John O'Quinn Field
- NCAA division: Division I FBS
- Conference: Big 12
- Colors: Scarlet and white
- All-time record: 494–408–15 (.547)
- Bowl record: 14–16–1 (.468)

Conference championships
- MVC: 1952, 1956, 1957, 1959 SWC: 1976, 1978, 1979, 1984 C-USA: 1996, 2006 AAC: 2015

Division championships
- C-USA West: 2006, 2007, 2009, 2011 AAC West: 2015, 2018
- Heisman winners: Andre Ware – 1989
- Consensus All-Americans: 10
- Rivalries: Baylor (rivalry); Rice (rivalry); SMU (rivalry); Texas Tech (rivalry)
- Fight song: Cougar Fight Song
- Mascot: Shasta
- Marching band: Spirit of Houston
- Website: uhcougars.com

The Houston Cougars football program is an NCAA Division I FBS football team that represents the University of Houston. The team is commonly referred to as "Houston" or "U of H". The UH football program is a member of the Big 12 Conference. Since the 2014 season, the Cougars have played their home games on campus at TDECU Stadium, which was built on the site formerly occupied by Robertson Stadium, where they played home games from 1941 to 1950 and from 1994 to 2012. Over the history of the program, the Cougars have won 11 conference championships and have had several players elected to the College Football Hall of Fame, including a Heisman Trophy winner.

== History ==
=== Early history (1946–1961) ===
In 1941, Johnny Goyen, then sports editor for The Cougar, and Jack Valenti, president of the sophomore class, began a petition for an official intercollegiate football team at the university. The next year, the two called a student body meeting to organize another petition. This petition's purpose was to challenge Rice Institute (later known as Rice University) to a football game. The Rice Owls were an established program, having played since 1919 as a member of the Southwest Conference. In August 1945, the University of Houston announced that the school would field a football team for the first time. Following the announcement, the Lone Star Conference, spearheaded by Theron J. Fouts of North Texas and Puny Wilson of Sam Houston State, extended an invitation for Houston to join on October 25, 1945.

In September 1946, the team became a reality after Harry Fouke, UH's first athletic director, hired successful high school coach Jewell Wallace, and tryouts were held. One hundred thirty students showed up, only ten of whom had actually played college football before. Many of the married students lived on-campus at a makeshift village for World War II veterans, while some others lived in the university's recreation center in bunks for naval recruits training at UH during the war. Prior to joining the Cougars, Wallace served as head coach for San Angelo High School. During the spring training for the first team, Goyen and Valenti's petition was finally answered, as Coach Wallace arranged a small practice game between Rice and Houston. The meeting was to be at Rice. When the team arrived at the field in their practice uniforms, they realized that the game was much more serious. Officials were there, and the stadium was full of spectators. The game ended with Rice demolishing the Houston Cougars. The game had an attendance of 11,000. It wouldn't be until 1971 that the Cougars and Owls competed again.

Playing in Houston Public School Stadium as a part of the Lone Star Conference on September 21, 1946, the Cougars played their first official game against Southwestern Louisiana Institute (later known as the University of Louisiana at Lafayette) using the Split-T offensive strategy. Although Charlie Manichia, the Cougars' starting quarterback, scored the first touchdown of the game (and in Cougar history), the team lost to SLI 13–7. The next game, the Cougars played against West Texas State Teachers College (later known as West Texas A&M University), and won their first game 14–12. The Cougars finished up their first season with a 4–6–0 record. Wallace continued as head coach for the Cougars until the end of the 1947 season, when Clyde Lee took over.

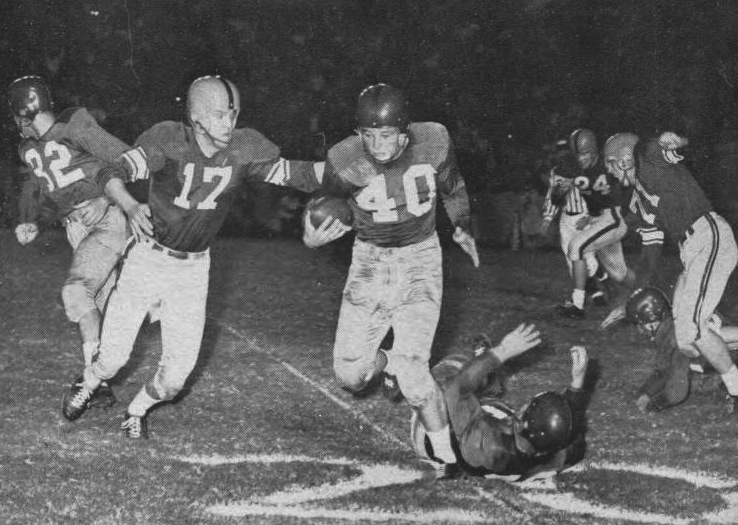
Ole Miss Rebels at Houston during the 1952 season under Lee

Clyde Lee, a University of Tulsa assistant coach, became Houston's second head coach in February 1948. To replace the remainder of Wallace's team that didn't return, Lee turned to junior colleges for the majority of his recruiting. At this time, the University of Houston, along with Texas Tech University, attempted to join the established Southwest Conference, but were rejected. In response, several universities from the Lone Star Conference formed the Gulf Coast Conference. This marked the Cougars' first time playing as an NCAA University division team (later known as simply Division I), and the first time Houston offered athletics scholarships. Also during this time, Lee set up formal housing facilities for students. The 1949 season was prefaced with an act of vandalism from Houston fans on the campus of The College of William & Mary. William & Mary was the opening game of the season between both schools.

In 1951, the Cougars began playing in the Missouri Valley Conference, moved into Houston Stadium, and made it to their first bowl game. The 1952 season proved to be a breakout one for the Cougars, and the team claimed the conference title. In addition to being ranked No. 19 in the nation by UPI (the first time the Cougars were nationally ranked), 1952 also marked the first meetings between UH and Texas A&M University, University of Arkansas, and Ole Miss. J.D. Kimmel, a former player for the Army Cadets, became Houston's first All-American when the Associated Press chose him for the 1952 team. The year after, UH met with the University of Texas at Austin for the first time in football. Such events proved that the team was growing quickly. However, in 1954, Lee retired from coaching after a 37–32–2 overall record. Lee was credited with having transitioned the Cougars from a small-time team to a legitimate collegiate force in football.

After a 45-day search for a head coach replacement, Bill Meek, a successful head coach from Kansas State University, signed a contract with the Cougars and was appointed as Houston's head coach on January 19, 1955. The Cougars' 1955 opening game against the University of Montana marked a 54–12 victory, the first opening victory since 1948. It was during this season that UH attempted to gain a membership to the Southeastern Conference (SEC). Ole Miss, UH's sponsor to the conference, had played the Cougars in their ninth game of the season, and although the Cougars lost, Ole Miss felt the team was worthwhile. The SEC decided to wait a year to determine whether UH would be a member of the conference. The 1956 season was thus an important one for the team. The Cougars won the Missouri Valley Conference title for the second time, and tied with the Southwest Conference's nationally ranked Texas A&M Aggies during their meeting. However, UH lost to both SEC scheduled teams during the season. Both Southwest Conference and Southeastern Conference bids by the Cougars were once again rejected. During the next season, Meek left UH for Southern Methodist University.

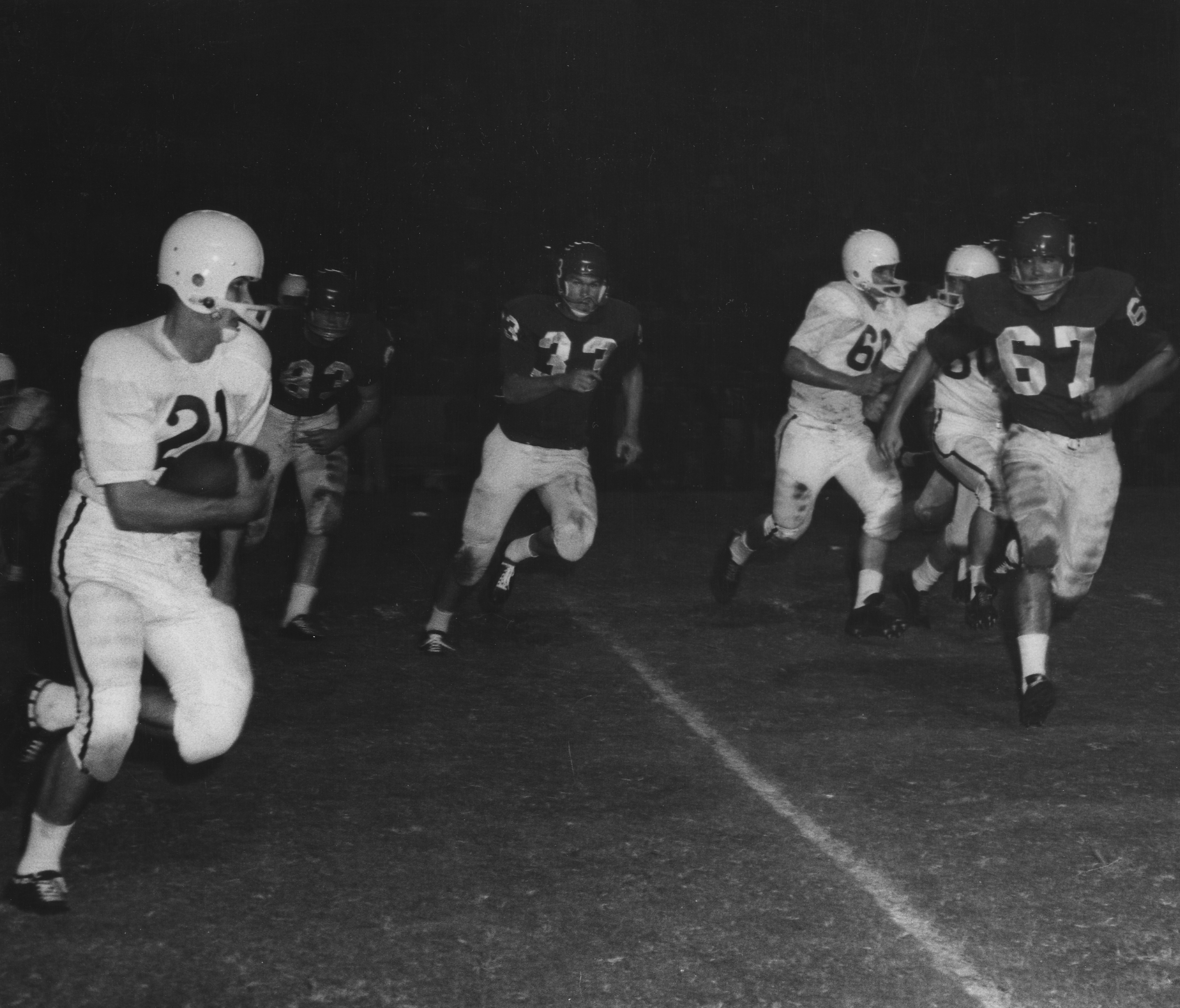
Houston versus Texas A&M during the 1958 season under Lahar

Hal Lahar was announced as Houston's next head coach on January 18, 1957. Lahar came from Colgate University, where he had served as head coach for five seasons. In college, Lahar had played for the Oklahoma Sooners, where he was a part of the school's first bowl team. Under Lahar, during the 1958 season, the Cougars became a nationally recognized offensive leader, as the team scored a combined 117 points in their first three games. Lahar's offensive strategy was best characterized as Split-T. After winning the Missouri Valley Conference titles again in 1957 and 1959, Lahar left UH in 1961 and headed back to Colgate University.

=== Bill Yeoman era (1962–1986) ===
Under Hall of Fame coach Bill Yeoman, the Cougars compiled a record of 160–108–8. His 160 victories rank 51st on the NCAA all-time list and make him the winningest coach in Cougar history. He used the Veer offense in 1964, an offense which he pioneered, and quickly helped lead the Cougars to national prominence. Yeoman's Cougars finished the season ranked in the top 5 twice, four times in the Top 10, and ten times in the Top 20. Yeoman is considered one of the all-time greatest college football coaches and led Houston to sustained success over his 25 years as head coach.

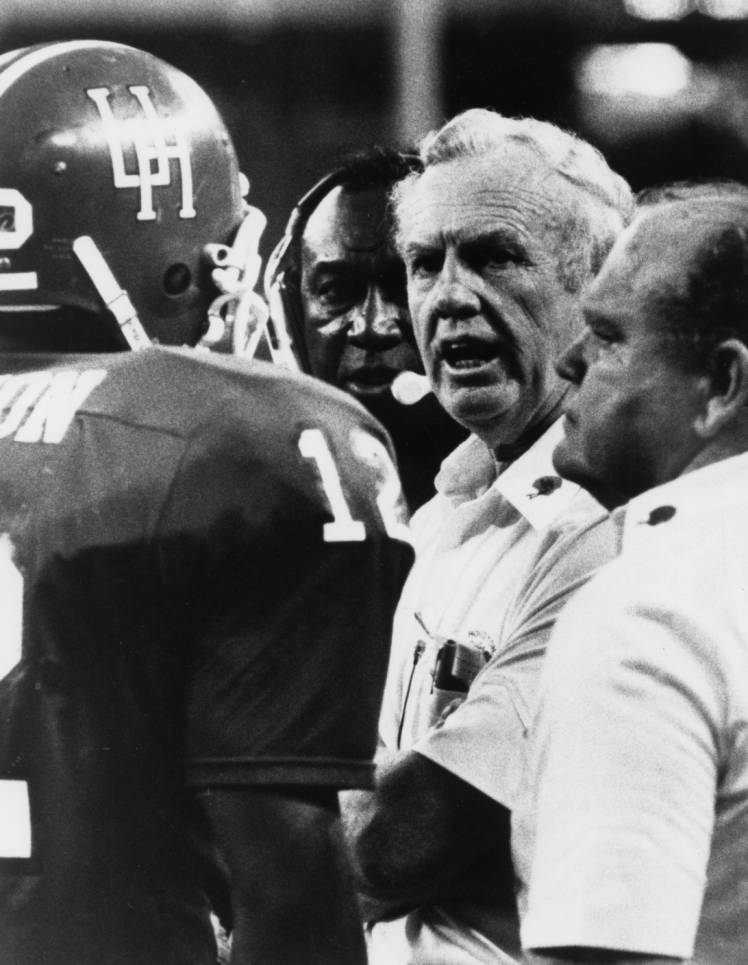
Yeoman coaching the Cougars on the sidelines

In 1964, Yeoman broke the color barrier for major Texas football programs when the University of Houston signed San Antonio's Warren McVea to a scholarship. On September 11, 1965, the Cougars played their first nationally televised game on NBC against Tulsa.

For three straight years Houston led the nation in total offense, averaging 437 yards a game in 1966, 427 in 1967, and 562 in 1968. The 1968 total was an NCAA record at the time. Houston also led the nation in scoring with 42.5 points per game that year, including a 100–6 rattling of Tulsa that set several records for UH: largest point differential in a win (94), most points scored (100), and being the last team in Division I to date to score 100 points in a single game and the last in any NCAA division until Rockford College scored 105 in 2003.

He guided the Cougars to four Southwest Conference Championships—1976, 1978, 1979, and 1984—and a 6–4–1 record in bowl games including Cotton Bowl Classic victories over the Maryland Terrapins in the 1976 season and the Nebraska Cornhuskers in the 1979 season. In 1976, Houston's first year as a member of the SWC, Yeoman was named Texas Coach of the Year and runner-up for National Coach of the Year. Yeoman was elected to the College Football Hall of Fame in 2001 and the Texas Sports Hall of Fame in 2003. He coached 46 All-Americans and 69 NFL players. In 1978, the NCAA subdivided the Division I into Division I-A and Division I-AA with Houston being a part of the former (now known as Division I FBS).

However, his career was not without controversy. In 1986, allegations surfaced regarding illegal recruiting inducements and extra benefits for his players. Due in part to these revelations, Yeoman was forced to retire at the end of the 1986 season after a 1–10 campaign.

Yeoman is the longest-serving coach in Cougar history, having been with the team from 1962 to 1986. After retiring as head coach, Yeoman remained with the Cougars as a fundraiser, a position he held until his death.

=== Jack Pardee era (1987–1989) ===
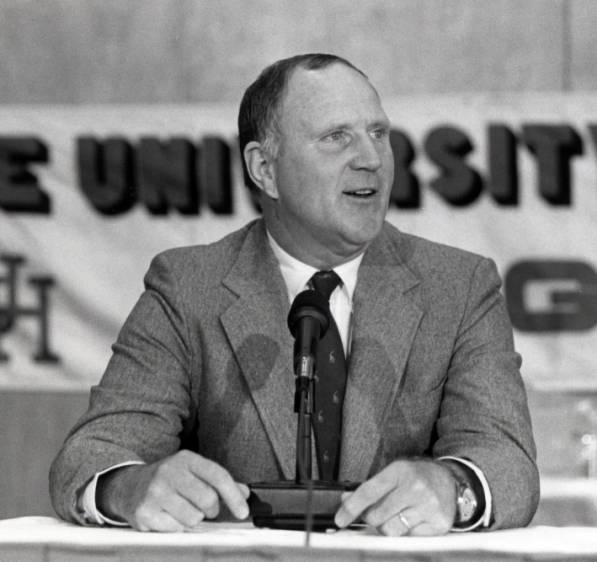
Jack Pardee as head coach of the Houston Cougars

Following Yeoman's retirement, Houston hired Jack Pardee to be the program's sixth head coach. Pardee was a former NFL All-Pro linebacker who had previously held head coaching positions with the Chicago Bears, Washington Redskins and the USFL's Houston Gamblers. Pardee brought with him the Run & Shoot offense and a young offensive coordinator named John Jenkins. The Run & Shoot offense was a strongly pass-oriented system that called for throwing the ball on most downs and in almost any situation. The Cougars would become one of the top offensive teams in the country during the Run & Shoot years.

In 1987, Pardee's first season, the team struggled in adjusting to the new system but scored a 60–40 home upset of the Texas Longhorns on the way to a 4–6–1 finish. The 1988 season saw great improvement in all aspects of team play with the Cougars posting a 9–3 mark, ultimately finishing 2nd in the Southwest Conference standings. The team played in the Aloha Bowl but fell 24–22 to Washington State. The Cougars' offense was led by quarterback Andre Ware, who had been originally recruited to UH by Bill Yeoman as a Veer-option quarterback. UH finished the 1988 regular season at No. 18 in the AP Poll.

In 1988, the NCAA announced that it would levy sanctions against the Houston football program for numerous major rules violations during the Yeoman era. The university was charged with around 250 violations and was assessed some of the most severe penalties for a program at the time. The program was placed on probation for five years, banned from playing in bowl games for two years, and kicked off live television during the 1989 season. However, the most damaging penalty in the long run was a reduction to 15 scholarships for the 1989 season. Draconian as these penalties were, the NCAA said that they would have been even harsher (including being limited to 20 scholarships for 1990 and 50 paid recruiting visits for 1989) had Yeoman still been coach. The lack of television exposure in 1989 was a setback but ultimately did not dampen the accolades UH would garner in a record-setting season.

The 1989 season was one of the most memorable in UH football history. Andre Ware continued his dramatic development as a passer and posted unprecedented passing statistics en route to winning the 1989 Heisman Trophy. Ware passed for 4,699 yards and threw 46 touchdown passes on the season. He posted one of his finest performances with 475 yards passing in the Cougars' 47–9 rout of archrival Texas in the Astrodome. The Cougars set many offensive records during the season. The Cougars finished the 1989 season at 9–2 and 2nd in the Southwest Conference but could not go to a bowl game. UH finished the season ranked No. 14 in the AP poll.

After the 1989 season, Pardee was hired as the head coach of the Houston Oilers and Jenkins was named his successor. The Pardee era at UH had been the most successful period in Cougar football since the late 1970s. The program enjoyed consistent success on the field, and helped to usher in the explosion of passing offense in college football. The Cougars' prolific offense and Andre Ware's Heisman Trophy raised the program to a level of national recognition that it had perhaps never enjoyed before. Pardee was later considered as a returning head coach for the Cougars after Art Briles left the program, but was eventually passed over in favor of Kevin Sumlin. Pardee had not coached since 1995.

=== John Jenkins era (1990–1992) ===
Jenkins received recognition for his contribution to the creation and deployment of the Run & Shoot offense. The statistical output of his offensive system was highest in the year 1990.

Led by new quarterback David Klingler, the Cougars' offense put up even more eye-popping numbers in the 1990 season than they had a year before. Klingler set a record by throwing 11 touchdown passes in a single game during an 84–21 rout of Eastern Washington University at the Astrodome. In a final-game victory over Arizona State University in the Coca-Cola Classic played in the Tokyo Dome in Tokyo, Japan, the two teams combined for 107 points and over 1,000 yards passing.

The Cougars achieved a high ranking of No. 3 in the AP poll but fell out of national championship contention following a late-season loss to the No. 14 Texas Longhorns. The Cougars finished the 1990 season with a 10–1 record and a No. 10 national ranking, again good for only 2nd in the conference standings. Klingler finished 3rd in Heisman balloting behind BYU's Ty Detmer and Notre Dame's Raghib Ismail. The program was serving its final season of probation and was again ineligible to play in a bowl game.

Despite returning David Klingler and several other stars, the 1991 season saw a significant downturn from the Cougars' previous four-year arc of improvement. The season began in rousing fashion with a 73–3 home rout of Louisiana Tech, but the second game marked what would in hindsight be the end of an era. In a game nationally televised on ESPN that had been billed as an intersectional meeting of powers, the 12th-ranked Cougars faced the second-ranked Miami Hurricanes at the Orange Bowl. Miami blitzed early and often, keeping the Cougars' high-powered offense from getting any momentum. The Cougars not only lost the game 40–10, but also lost a good deal of the mystique surrounding their offense. The Cougars' other opponents saw that relentless blitzing could throw the Cougars off their rhythm. A week later against Illinois saw more of the same; they lost that contest 51–10 and fell out of the polls altogether. Although the Cougars beat Texas for the fourth time in five years, they finished seventh in the conference with a 3–5 record and a 4–7 overall record. After the season, Klingler was selected No. 6 overall in the 1992 NFL draft, while defensive end Glenn Cadrez was picked No. 154 overall by the New York Jets. This came around the time that the sanctions imposed in 1989, especially the reduced complement of scholarships, began taking their full effect. The 1991 season marked the start of what would be a decade-long fall from the successes of the late 1980s. From 1991 to 2004, the Cougars would have only three winning seasons.

The 1992 season saw the program continue its slide. New quarterback Jimmy Klingler posted impressive performances against inferior competition, but the Cougars struggled against the better teams on the schedule. The defense also struggled, often giving up so many points that even the prolific offense couldn't keep up. Jenkins increasingly came under fire for his teams' poor defensive performance and his propensity to "run up the score" in an unsportsmanlike manner against weaker opponents. The '92 season ended with the Cougars finishing 4–7 yet again.

The controversial Jenkins resigned under pressure on April 17, 1993, after a group of departing players including Trey Hooper, Tim Woods, Geoff Tait, Christopher Tuffin and star receiver Tracy Good contacted legendary sports columnist Dick Schaap, who arranged for an investigative team from ESPN to look into long-rumored NCAA violations allegedly being committed by their former head coach (the story went on to win ESPN a 1993 Sports Emmy). Jenkins finished his tenure with an 18–15 overall record, though in his final two years he only won a total of eight games overall and five games in Southwest Conference play. In the chaos surrounding the sudden resignation of Jenkins, Houston athletic director Bill Carr hired Los Angeles Raiders offensive line coach Kim Helton to become the eighth head coach in the history of the program.

=== Kim Helton era (1993–1999) ===
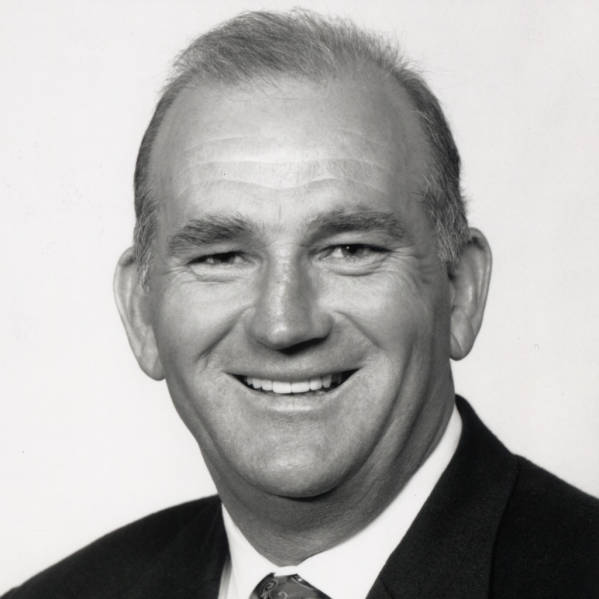
Former Houston head coach Kim Helton

After the controversy and NCAA sanctions of the late 1980s and early 1990s, the UH athletics administration was determined to remake the football program into one founded on sound discipline and transparency. Helton seemed to fit this blueprint perfectly. The tough-talking, no-nonsense Helton was nearly the diametric opposite of the brash, innovative Jenkins. Where Jenkins believed in the primacy of passing offense above all else, Helton preached a hard-nosed brand of football centered on fundamentals that was a throwback to the 1970s.

Despite returning all 11 starters on offense for the 1993 season, Helton discarded the high-powered Run & Shoot offense in favor of a more traditional run-based attack. However, the players already on the roster had been mostly recruited by Pardee and Jenkins. They found it hard to adjust to Helton's new scheme. Additionally, the team was still reeling from the loss of scholarships due to the sanctions imposed in 1988; the Cougars would not have a full complement of scholarships until 1994. The team struggled mightily under the weight of the offensive sea change and the scholarship limits. In Helton's first three seasons (1993–95), the Cougars limped to a combined 4–28–1 record for a winning percentage of just .125, including an 0–12 mark in nonconference play.

Helton eschewed the program's long-time reliance on local talent and instead began heavily recruiting junior college players from Florida, Georgia and Mississippi. By doing so, Helton effectively severed the program's ties to the local high schools that had long been the lifeblood of UH football. Indeed, many local high school coaches claimed that they never even saw Helton during his seven-year tenure as head coach. This was a dramatic change for a program that had historically featured national powers built around Houston-area talent.

In 1994, four schools from the Southwest Conference announced they would join the members of the Big Eight Conference to form what would become the Big 12 Conference. Houston, along with TCU, SMU, and Rice, would not be invited to join the new conference. After over 80 years of SWC play including 21 successful years of UH membership, the SWC ceased to exist at the end of the 1995 season.

UH joined the newly formed Conference USA for the 1996 season. In the inaugural season of C-USA play, led by future NFL running back Antowain Smith and quarterback Chuck Clements, the Cougars went 7–5—their first winning season in six years. They also went 4–1 in conference play to win a share of the inaugural C-USA title, their first "official" conference title of any sort in 13 years. UH won that season's pivotal game against Southern Miss 56–49 in overtime. As part of a new trend, the game was played at on-campus Robertson Stadium rather than at their long-time home, the Astrodome. The Cougars also played in their first bowl game since 1988, losing to No. 21 Syracuse 30–17 in the Liberty Bowl.

This did not last, and the Cougars regressed to consecutive 3–8 records in the 1997 and 1998 seasons. In 1999, the Cougars went 7–4, scoring an impressive late-season win at LSU. Four-year starter Ketric Sanford broke many Houston rushing records, but a 3–3 record in C-USA kept the Cougars out of a bowl. Despite the winning season, Helton was dismissed as head coach after the season. In his seven years at UH, Helton had compiled a 24–53 overall record.

The decade of the 1990s had not been a good one for UH football. After the almost magical 10–1 season of 1990 in which they held a No. 3 ranking into November, the Cougars had fallen out of the polls the following year and never returned in the decade. They had also gone to only one bowl game and tallied only one other winning season. The team's poor on-field performance had not been kind to fan interest. Attendance had slipped slowly downward throughout the decade, and the team often played in front of home crowds of fewer than 20,000 fans—a total that looked even smaller in the cavernous Astrodome. Perhaps worst of all, Houston had lost major conference membership after the SWC collapse, and now were once again a mid-major team. The program also lacked stability in the athletic department after several changes at athletic director. Clearly, significant change was needed for the program to break out of its cycle of apathy. In a move to alleviate the financial burden of paying rent to the Astrodome's operators, athletic director Chet Gladchuk began a drive to renovate Robertson Stadium to modern standards and move all home football games back to campus for the first time since the 1940s. This idea became a reality in the 1998 season. The following year, the stadium was heavily renovated to bring it up to Division I-A standards.

Also in 1999, the Houston–Rice rivalry was renewed after a three-year hiatus when the Southwest Conference disbanded. The Cougars defeated the Owls in that season's Bayou Bucket Classic.

Hoping to inject vitality into the program on the field, UH hired the successful 37-year-old head coach of Wyoming, Dana Dimel, to take over the program in late 1999.

=== Dana Dimel era (2000–2002) ===
After coaching at Kansas State as an assistant under the legendary Bill Snyder, Dana Dimel was selected as the 9th headman of the Houston Cougars after a successful stint as the head coach at Wyoming. Dimel took over the program with fan support at an all-time low. The program's relationship and standing with local high school coaches was also at a nadir as a result of Helton's often dismissive attitude toward local programs. As part of Dimel's rebuilding program, he vowed to bring back the aggressive passing attack that the Cougars had featured during the successful Pardee/Jenkins years.

In the 2000 season, the Cougars opened with a 3–4 stretch, but didn't win another game for the remainder of the season as they finished 3–8. During the off-season, Dimel brought in one of the program's best-rated recruiting classes in decades, and he began reestablishing positive relationships with local high school programs.

Despite the positive attention surrounding Dimel's first recruiting class, the 2001 season was an unmitigated disaster. The Cougars went 0–11 on the season—to date, the only winless campaign in the history of the program. Despite the poor season, Dimel again brought in the top-rated recruiting class in Conference USA. The class featured a number of players who would form the nucleus of future winning teams, players such as Jackie Battle, Willie Gaston, Will Gulley and Roshawn Pope.

The Cougars fared better in the 2002 season, but new athletic director Dave Maggard made it clear that he expected significant progress in the program's performance on the field. Late in the year, with the Cougars holding a 4–7 record, Maggard informed Dimel that he would not be asked to return as head coach for the 2003 season. The final game of the 2002 season was a rousing 27–10 upset win over Louisville that spoiled the Cardinals' chances of winning the conference title, but UH finished with a 5–7 record which was good for only 8th best in Conference USA. Despite landing some highly rated recruits, the Dimel era featured tremendous disappointment. Dimel had an 8–26 record in three years.

=== Art Briles era (2003–2007) ===
Seeking a sense of stability in the coaching staff, athletic director Dave Maggard began the search for a new head coach who would stay and build the program over the long term. To this end, Maggard began searching for coaches with close ties to UH and Texas football in general. The candidate who jumped to the fore was Art Briles, a former Cougar player under Bill Yeoman and assistant at Texas Tech. Briles had earned a reputation as a top-flight offensive coach while the head coach at Stephenville High School of Stephenville, Texas, where he led the team to multiple state titles running his unique version of the spread offense. Briles became the 10th head coach in Cougar football history, and the first former UH player to hold the position.

Briles inherited a program that had lost its way on the field but was stocked with young talent from Dimel's exceptional recruiting classes. The Cougars had only won eight games in Dimel's three-year tenure, but things were about to change. In his first season, Briles led the Cougars to a 7–5 record and their first bowl appearance since the 1996 season. The Cougars lost the Sheraton Hawaii Bowl to the Hawaii Warriors 54–48 in triple overtime on Christmas Day, 2003.

After a successful inaugural season under Briles, the Cougars fell back to 3–8 in 2004. Briles guided the Cougars to a 6–6 season in 2005 and an appearance in the Fort Worth Bowl. The Cougars' hopes for a winning season were ended in a 42–13 bowl-game rout at the hands of the Kansas Jayhawks.

The 2006 season was the most successful for UH in over 15 years. Led by senior quarterback Kevin Kolb, the Cougars romped to a 9–3 regular season record and a spot in the Conference USA Championship game against Southern Miss. The Cougars hosted the nationally televised game at Robertson Stadium and won 34–20 to claim the school's second C-USA Championship and 10th conference title overall. The Cougars finished the season with a loss to the South Carolina Gamecocks in the Liberty Bowl that gave them a final won–loss record of 10–4.

In 2007, the Cougars went 8–4 and finished second in the Conference USA West Division to the Tulsa Golden Hurricane. In late November the Cougars accepted an invitation to the Texas Bowl. Two days later, Art Briles interviewed for the vacant Baylor Bears head coaching position and was hired the next day. Despite criticism from many Houston fans, Briles promptly left Houston for Waco and did not return to coach the Cougars for their bowl game in December. Cornerbacks coach Chris Thurmond was named interim coach for the bowl game which the Cougars lost to TCU, 20–13.

Despite the rancor surrounding the departure of Art Briles, his coaching tenure had been the most successful at UH since Jack Pardee departed for the NFL almost 20 years before. Briles had recruited well and coached his teams to on-field success, compiling a 34–28 record in his five seasons. More importantly, Briles had helped to return the program to respectability, most notably with the 2006 C-USA Championship. Briles's close ties with Texas high school coaches helped him to strengthen the program's ties to its primary talent base, and several of his players had been prominent selections in the NFL draft. Fan interest increased in the Briles era, and talk began of expanding Robertson Stadium beyond its current capacity. It is not too much to say that Art Briles brought the program to heights it had not seen since the 1980s.

=== Kevin Sumlin era (2008–2011) ===
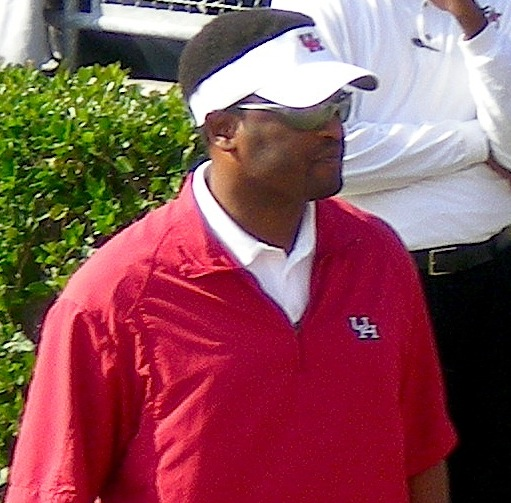
Kevin Sumlin in 2008

On December 14, 2007, Kevin Sumlin, a co-offensive coordinator for the Oklahoma Sooners, was named as the Houston Cougars' 11th head football coach. Sumlin became the first African-American head coach in Cougar history, and the eighth in the NCAA's Football Bowl Subdivision.

Sumlin's first season in 2008 began with a rocky start as Houston lost consecutive games to Oklahoma State, Air Force, and Colorado State but rebounded to finish with a promising 8–5 record and achieved a bowl-game victory in a rematch with Air Force in the Armed Forces Bowl. At the start of the 2008 season Coach Kevin Sumlin named sophomore Case Keenum as the starting quarterback for the Cougars and implemented a high-octane pass-based offense. Keenum would throw for over 5,000 yards that season. In 2008, under Coach Sumlin, Houston ended its twenty-eight-year bowl game losing streak as they won the 2008 Armed Forces Bowl

In the 2009 season, the Sumlin-led Cougars defeated No. 5-ranked Oklahoma State in Stillwater to capture its first victory over a top-10 opponent in 21 years, and first victory over a top-5 opponent in 25 years. After the victory, the Cougars were ranked (No. 21 in the AP Top 25) for the first time since September 17, 1991. In the following game, in front of a sold-out crowd at Robertson Stadium, Houston defeated Texas Tech 29–28 following a furious final-minute comeback. Overall, Houston went on to compile a 10–4 record and lost to East Carolina in the C-USA Championship game, which was followed by an uninspired performance against Air Force in the Armed Forces Bowl. The Cougars reached No. 12 in the major polls before losing their final two games.

There was great promise as Houston was ranked to begin the 2010 season, having not seen a preseason ranking since the early 1990s. After the Cougars routed their first two opponents, star quarterback Case Keenum suffered a season-ending ACL injury, and backup QB Cotton Turner was also lost for the season, being injured in the same game against UCLA. The 2010 season resulted in a disappointing 5–7 record, but the NCAA granted quarterback Case Keenum a sixth year of eligibility, which allowed the record-setting passer to return for the 2011 season.

In 2011, after compiling a 12–0 record and reaching No. 6 in the BCS rankings, Houston was on the verge of becoming a so-called "BCS Buster", needing only a home win over Southern Mississippi in the C-USA Championship game to clinch a bid to the Sugar Bowl and a $17 million BCS Bowl payout. But the Cougars' dreams were dashed as the Golden Eagles defeated UH 49–28 at Robertson Stadium, amid rumors that Sumlin was already being courted and had accepted the head-coaching position at Texas A&M. Sumlin was announced as the new head coach of Texas A&M University on December 10, 2011. Houston finished the season 13–1 and was ranked in the final major-college football polls (No. 18 AP/ No. 14 USA Today Coaches, No. 19 BCS) for the first time since the 1990 season.

The Kevin Sumlin era saw Houston return to prominence behind the arm of the NCAA's all-time leading passer, Case Keenum, and an air-raid offense designed by offensive coordinator Dana Holgorsen. Under Coach Sumlin, Houston was known for its offensive prowess, leading the NCAA in yards per game in 2009 and 2011, scoring on average over 50 points-per-game in the 2011 regular season. Houston scored over 70 points three times during Sumlin's tenure and broke numerous offensive passing records behind the NCAA's all-time leading passer, Case Keenum. Kevin Sumlin won more games in his first four seasons than any other Houston head coach in history.

=== Tony Levine era (2011–2014) ===
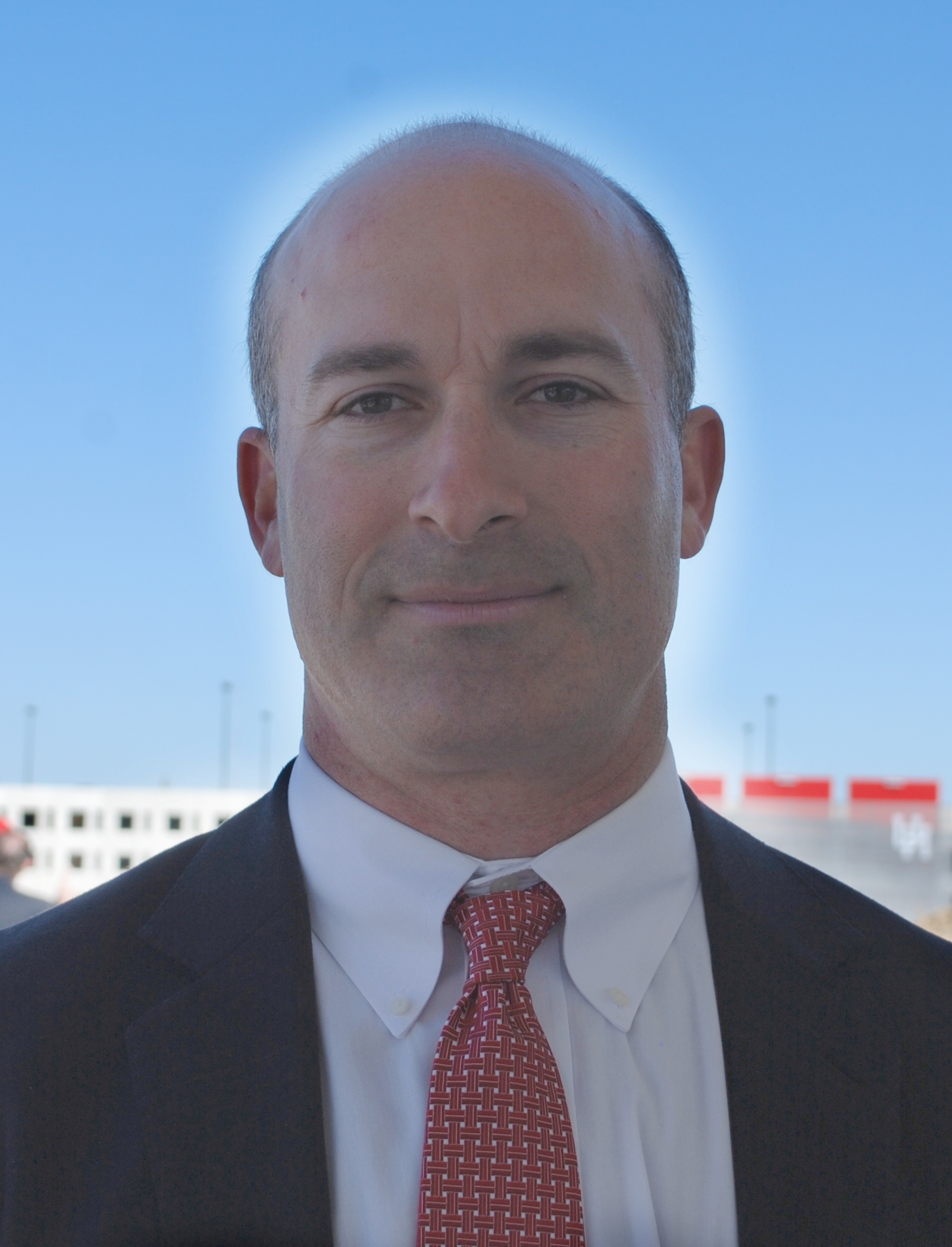
Tony Levine

Tony Levine was named interim head coach for the 2012 TicketCity Bowl in which the Cougars defeated Penn State 30–14. Following a ten-day coaching search during which eight candidates were considered, Levine was promoted to permanent head coach of the University of Houston football team. Additionally, Houston announced that it would break ground in December 2012 on a new state-of-the-art football stadium.

In Levine's first season as a head coach, Houston suffered a crushing home loss to the Texas State Bobcats, who were playing in their first game as a Division I FBS team. In the fallout of the loss, coach Mike Nesbitt resigned his position as offensive coordinator for the Cougars. Assistant coach Travis Bush assumed play-calling duties for the Cougars for the rest of the season. The Cougars would finish the season at 5–7, miss out on a bowl bid, and suffer a defeat at SMU in which the Cougars allowed the most points to an opponent in school history and gave up a school record nine turnovers.

The 2013 season saw a turnaround, and the Cougars began play in a new conference, the American Athletic Conference. The Cougars were forced to play off campus at Reliant Stadium and BBVA Compass Stadium while the new on-campus stadium was built. After shooting out to a 5–0 record, the Cougars regressed towards the end of the season, but managed to finish their season by defeating SMU 34–0, Houston's first shutout win since 1999. They finished the season 8–4 which garnered the Coogs a berth in the 2014 BBVA Compass Bowl versus Vanderbilt, where they lost 41–24. After the season, the offensive coordinator, Doug Meacham, left the program, making way for Travis Bush to take over as offensive coordinator a second time. The Houston Cougars returned to campus and the newly christened TDECU Stadium, for the 2014 season.

In the 2014 season, the long-awaited opening of TDECU Stadium was marred by a loss to UTSA. The Cougars struggled out of the gate in 2014 going 2–3 with poor production on offense until Greg Ward, Jr. took over at the quarterback position. The Cougars would rebound, winning five of the seven final games to finish the season, primarily due to Ward's playmaking ability and the standout defense of defensive coordinator, David Gibbs. Despite the turnaround, Levine would not be able to recover from the backlash of the home opener against UTSA, and on December 8, 2014, Levine was fired after three seasons of presiding over the Cougars. The Cougars faced the Pitt Panthers in the Armed Forces Bowl, where defensive coordinator, David Gibbs, was acting head coach. The Cougars were dominated for the first three quarters, but with less than 11 minutes left on the game clock and Houston trailing Pittsburgh by 25 points, the Cougars stormed back and won the game by a score of 35–34. It was the largest fourth quarter comeback in bowl history.

=== Tom Herman era (2015–2016) ===
Tom Herman was hired on December 15, 2014, to replace Levine, after winning the Broyles Award as the nation's top assistant coach while serving under Urban Meyer at Ohio State. Herman led the Cougars in his first season as head coach to its first conference championship since 2006 by beating rival Temple 24–13 in the inaugural American Athletic Conference Championship, ending the regular season 12–1. The 2015 Houston Cougars football team was selected to play in the Peach Bowl, where, on December 31, 2015, they defeated the Florida State Seminoles 38–24. UH finished ranked 8th in the AP Top 25 Poll. A finalist for the Eddie Robinson and Bear Bryant Coach of the Year Awards, Herman was named the Football Writers Association of America First-Year Coach of the Year and the American Athletic Conference Co-Coach of the Year. In Herman's first semester at Houston, the Houston Cougars Football program set the mark for most hours passed per student-athlete in a spring semester with an average of 13.5 hours per student-athlete. The team recorded its highest semester GPA in the last four years, and third-highest spring semester GPA in program history, to bolster its cumulative GPA to the second-highest mark in program history.

The excitement surrounding Houston football reached a fever pitch in the Fall of 2016 with a top 6 ranked Cougar team that was simultaneously touted as the leading Big 12 expansion candidate. Tom Herman enjoyed extreme popularity among Houston and College football fans and national media entering his second season with Houston's with perhaps the most promising roster ever for this football team that included returning starters Greg Ward and a loaded defense that featured highly recruited five star Defensive Lineman Ed Oliver. Tom Herman led the Cougars to a convincing opening-game win over the third-ranked Oklahoma Sooners at the AdvoCare Texas Kickoff in Houston. The team went on a five-game winning streak, earning national recognition and prospects of competing in the 2016 College Football Playoffs, until losing to Navy and later to the SMU Mustangs in early October during the same week the Big 12 denied Houston entrance into the Conference. it would later be found out that the Texas Longhorns were already courting Tom Herman and this leaked to the locker room, likely contributing to the inconsistent play on the field. The Cougars ended the regular season with a disappointing 9–3 record. Before losing at Memphis, Houston re-entered the rankings and achieved a resounding second signature win over the fifth-ranked Louisville Cardinals in mid-November before a packed home crowd. On November 26, 2016, moments after losing to Memphis it was announced that Herman would leave the University of Houston to take on the role of head football coach at Houston rival and Big 12 power in the University of Texas at Austin. Defensive Coordinator Todd Orlando was named interim head coach that same day.

=== Major Applewhite era (2016–2018) ===
On December 9, 2016, Major Applewhite was named head coach following the departure of Tom Herman. Applewhite had served as the Cougars' offensive coordinator under Herman. He was given a five-year contract. Applewhite made his Houston coaching debut in the Las Vegas Bowl with a skeleton staff, which the Cougars lost to the San Diego State Aztecs by a score of 34–10. Houston finished the 2016 season with a 9–4 record.

The 2017 Houston Cougar season's opening game against UTSA was canceled due to Hurricane Harvey, which caused severe flooding and damage to the city of Houston and the Gulf Coast. The Cougars instead opened on the road against Arizona winning in a low scoring game, 19–16. The Cougars would finish 2017 at 7–4. The Cougars earned a bowl bid to the 2017 Hawai'i Bowl, where they lost to the resurgent Fresno State Bulldogs, 33–27.

The 2018 season saw Houston get off to a 7–1 start, but ended with the Cougars losing four of their final five games due to mounting injuries, including All-American defensive lineman, Ed Oliver. Despite their slide, at 8–4, the Coogs were tied for first place in the American West Division with the Memphis Tigers, but would miss out on the conference championship game due to a head-to-head record tie-breaker. Houston, with a depleted roster and staff, lost 70–14 to a historically good Army team in the Armed Forces Bowl to post a final record of 8–5. On December 30, Houston fired Applewhite after two seasons and a 15–11 record.

=== Dana Holgorsen era (2019–2023) ===
On January 2, 2019, former West Virginia head coach Dana Holgorsen was named head coach following the firing of Major Applewhite. He was given a five-year contract. Holgorsen had long been courted to Houston by billionaire booster and chairman of the board of regents, Tilman Fertitta, a close friend. Holgorsen had previously served as an assistant under Kevin Sumlin with the Cougars.

Holgorsen went 4–8 in his first season and tied for last in the West Division of the American Athletic Conference. The 2019 season was tied for Houston's worst record since their winless 2001 season under Dimel. Holgorsen made national news for redshirting star players during the season in the hope of improving roster depth and talent for the 2020 season; it was suggested by this move that Holgorsen "tanked" the 2019 season.

In 2020, the COVID-19 pandemic limited Houston to seven regular season games in which they posted a 3–4 record. Despite a losing season for Holgorsen and the Coogs, Houston was selected to play in the 2020 New Mexico Bowl. This was possible, because the six-win requirement for bowl eligibility was waived for the 2020 season due to the pandemic. The Cougars lost that game 28–14 to finish the season with a 3–5 record, leaving Holgorsen at 7–13 after two years.

On September 10, 2021, the Houston Cougars accepted an invitation to join the Big 12 Conference, which was later realized on July 1, 2023. The 2021 season would be the first winning campaign of Holgorsen's tenure at UH. Starting QB, Clayton Tune, led a prolific offense against overmatched opponents. After losing the Texas Kickoff Classic at NRG Stadium against Texas Tech, the Cougars would rattle off 11 consecutive wins and earn their first bid to the AAC conference championship since the 2015 season. The Coogs would play the undefeated and #4 ranked Cincinnati Bearcats in the championship at Nippert Stadium. They lost to the Bearcats 20–35, but earned an invite to the Birmingham Bowl against the Auburn Tigers. The Coogs would end the season on a high, beating the Tigers in their backyard, 17–13; making it the first bowl win of the Holgorsen era.

The hype, returning talent, and positive end to 2021 led Houston to be projected as the conference favorites in their last year playing in the American Athletic and a preseason ranking in the top 25. However, inconsistent play and a more difficult schedule resulted in a lower than expected record in 2022. The Coogs would finish the regular season 7–5, missing out on their last opportunity to make the AAC Championship game. as a consolation, they would get their first-ever invite to the Independence Bowl to play against the Louisiana Ragin’ Cajuns, where they would end 2022 victorious in frigid conditions, winning 23–16 and ending the season 8–5. This was the last season in the AAC, as Houston joined the Big 12 Conference in 2023.

After a disappointing 4–8 record in their inaugural year of Big 12 play, Houston fired Holgorsen on November 26, 2023. He was 31–28 in five years at Houston.

=== Willie Fritz era (2024–present) ===
Following Dana Holgorsen's firing, former Tulane head coach Willie Fritz was hired as head coach on December 3, 2023. He was given a five-year contract.

His first season was a 4–8 campaign, although they did get an upset victory over #16 Kansas State at home.

In 2025, Houston saw much improvement over the previous season. The Cougars finished the season 10–3 (6–3 in Big 12 play) with losses to Texas Tech, West Virginia, and TCU. They were invited to the Texas Bowl, where they defeated LSU 38–35, in front of a crowd of 63,867 (the highest attendance for that bowl since 2019). This was the first 10-win season since 2021. Houston also finished ranked for the first time in 4 years; they were #22 in the final AP Poll and #19 in the Coaches Poll.

== Conference affiliations ==
The Houston Cougars football program started the same year as its basketball program in 1946. The Cougars played in the Lone Star Conference for their first few seasons through 1948. The university then decided to leave for the Gulf Coast Conference. From 1951 to 1959 Houston played in the Missouri Valley Conference. In 1956, when the NCAA split into divisions, the team began playing as a part of the University Division (later known as Division I). From 1960 to 1976 the Houston Cougars were a major independent, achieving six straight final Top-25 finishes (eight total while independent) and five bowl appearances. In 1976, the Cougars joined the now-defunct Southwest Conference, their first athletic conference membership since 1959. The Cougars became the only Texas university to ever win a pre-existing conference in their first year, doing so that same year. After the breakup of the SWC in 1996, Houston became a charter member of the newly formed Conference USA.

In October 2011, Houston was extended an invitation to join the Big East Conference in all sports. This invitation was significant because the Big East was an Automatic Qualifying conference in football, meaning that the conference champion automatically was invited to play in a lucrative BCS bowl. The invitation was motivated by the departures of Syracuse and Pittsburgh from the Big East to the Atlantic Coast Conference and was part of an effort by the Big East to shore up its strength in football. The board of regents of the University of Houston voted to authorize Houston president Renu Khator to take whatever action she deemed beneficial regarding conference realignment. On December 7, 2011, the University of Houston was officially announced as one of the newest members of the Big East Conference, effective July 2013. However, further membership turnover led to the Big East splitting into football-sponsoring and non-football conferences. The football-sponsoring conference, after selling the Big East name to the non-football conference, announced that it would operate as the American Athletic Conference after the split. In September 2021 the Houston Cougars announced they would accept their invitation to join the Big 12. This was part of the Big 12's attempts to regain strength after losing Texas and Oklahoma to the Southeastern Conference. The Cougars began play in the Big 12 in September 2023.

- Lone Star Conference (1946–1948)
- Gulf Coast Conference (1949)
- Independent (1950)
- Missouri Valley Conference (1951–1959)
- Independent (1960–1975)
- Southwest Conference (1976–1995)
- Conference USA (1996–2012)
- American Athletic Conference (2013–2022)
- Big 12 Conference (2023–present)

== Championships ==
=== Conference championships ===
The Cougars have won 11 conference championships in their history, six of which were outright championships. From 1960 to 1975, the Cougars were not eligible for a conference championship as they were not affiliated with any conference.

Year	Conference	Coach	Overall record	Conference record
1952	Missouri Valley Conference	Clyde Lee	8–2	3–0
1956	Missouri Valley Conference	Bill Meek	7–2–1	4–0
1957	Missouri Valley Conference	Hal Lahar	5–4–1	3–0
1959†	Missouri Valley Conference	Hal Lahar	3–7	3–1
1976†	Southwest Conference	Bill Yeoman	10–2	7–1
1978	Southwest Conference	Bill Yeoman	9–3	7–1
1979†	Southwest Conference	Bill Yeoman	11–1	7–1
1984†	Southwest Conference	Bill Yeoman	7–5	6–2
1996†	Conference USA	Kim Helton	7–5	4–1
2006	Conference USA	Art Briles	10–4	7–1
2015	American Athletic Conference	Tom Herman	13–1	7–1

† Co-champions

=== Division championships ===
Houston has won 6 division championships in two conferences.

Year	Division	Coach	CG opponent	CG result
2006	C-USA West	Art Briles	Southern Miss	W 34–20
2007†	C-USA West	Art Briles	N/A lost tie-breaker to Tulsa	
2009†	C-USA West	Kevin Sumlin	East Carolina	L 32–38
2011	C-USA West	Kevin Sumlin	Southern Miss	L 28–49
2015†	AAC West	Tom Herman	Temple	W 24–13
2018†	AAC West	Major Applewhite	N/A lost tie-breaker to Memphis	

† Co-champions

== Head coaches ==
Head coaches of the Houston Cougars. Willie Fritz became head coach in 2024.

Coach	Tenure	Overall Record	Conference Record
Jewell Wallace	1946–1947	7–14 (.333)	1–10 (.091)
Clyde Lee	1948–1954	37–32–2 (.535)	13–10 (.565)
Bill Meek	1955–1956	13–6–1 (.675)	6–2 (.750)
Hal Lahar	1957–1961	24–23–2 (.510)	8–3 (.727)
Bill Yeoman	1962–1986	160–108–8 (.594)	51–35–2 (.591)
Jack Pardee	1987–1989	22–11–1 (.662)	13–8–1 (.614)
John Jenkins	1990–1992	18–15 (.545)	12–11 (.522)
Kim Helton	1993–1999	24–53–1 (.314)	15–28–1 (.352)
Dana Dimel	2000–2002	8–26 (.235)	5–17 (.227)
Art Briles	2003–2007	34–28 (.548)	24–16 (.600)
Chris Thurmond (interim)	2007	0–1 (.000)	–
Kevin Sumlin	2008–2011	35–17 (.673)	24–8 (.750)
Tony Levine	2011–2014	21–17 (.553)	14–10 (.583)
David Gibbs (interim)	2014	1–0 (1.000)	–
Tom Herman	2015–2016	22–4 (.846)	12–4 (.750)
Major Applewhite	2016–2018	15–11 (.577)	10–6 (.625)
Dana Holgorsen	2019–2023	31–28 (.525)	20–19 (.513)
Willie Fritz	2024–present	14–11 (.560)	9–9 (.500)
Total		486–405–15 (.545)	

Note: Through 2025 season.

== Bowl games ==
Houston has participated in 31 bowl games, with the Cougars garnering a record of 14–16–1.

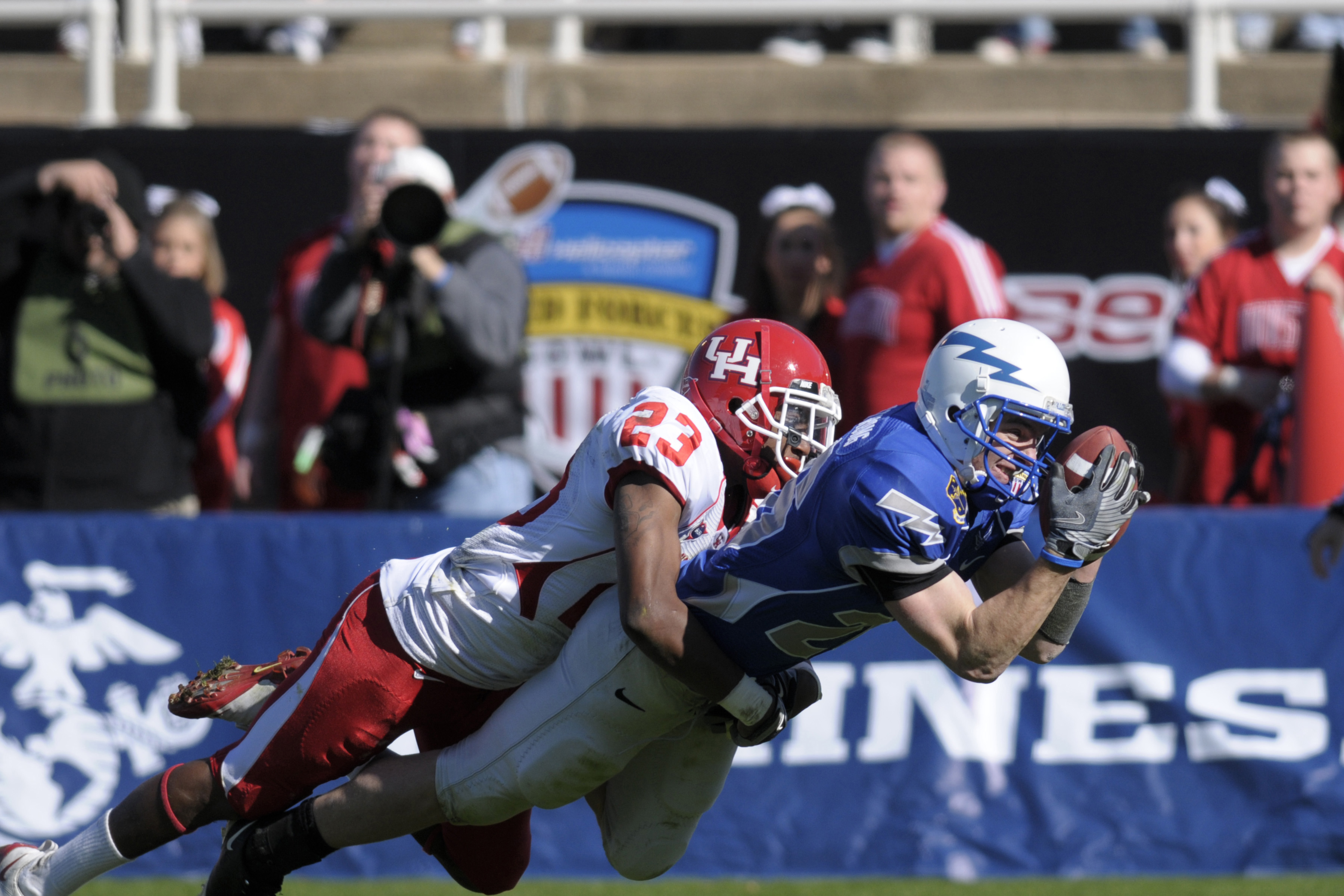
Houston defeats Air Force in the 2008 Armed Forces Bowl, ending their eight bowl game losing streak

Prior to Houston's 2008 Armed Forces Bowl win against Air Force, the Cougars had not won a bowl game since the 1980 Garden State Bowl. This put the Cougars in second place behind the Notre Dame Fighting Irish for the all-time longest bowl-game losing streak. Overall Houston has made 31 bowl appearances during its history, including four Cotton Bowls, in which Houston holds a 2–2 record with wins over Nebraska and Maryland. On January 2, 2012, Houston matched up with Penn State of the Big Ten in the TicketCity Bowl and won 30–14. The 2015 Armed Forces Bowl victory over Pittsburgh featured the largest fourth-quarter comeback in bowl history, as UH scored 25 total points in under 11 minutes and 22 unanswered points in the last six minutes. Houston was invited to its first New Year's Six bowl game in 2015, where they upset Florida State 38–24 in the Peach Bowl.

Season	Coach	Bowl	Opponent	Result
1951	Clyde Lee	Salad Bowl	Dayton	W 26–21
1962	Bill Yeoman	Tangerine Bowl	Miami (OH)	W 49–21
1969	Bill Yeoman	Astro-Bluebonnet Bowl	Auburn	W 37–7
1971	Bill Yeoman	Astro-Bluebonnet Bowl	Colorado	L 17–29
1973	Bill Yeoman	Astro-Bluebonnet Bowl	Tulane	W 47–7
1974	Bill Yeoman	Astro-Bluebonnet Bowl	NC State	T 31–31
1976	Bill Yeoman	Cotton Bowl Classic	Maryland	W 30–21
1978	Bill Yeoman	Cotton Bowl Classic	Notre Dame	L 34–35
1979	Bill Yeoman	Cotton Bowl Classic	Nebraska	W 17–14
1980	Bill Yeoman	Garden State Bowl	Navy	W 35–0
1981	Bill Yeoman	Sun Bowl	Oklahoma	L 14–40
1984	Bill Yeoman	Cotton Bowl Classic	Boston College	L 28–45
1988	Jack Pardee	Aloha Bowl	Washington State	L 22–24
1996	Kim Helton	Liberty Bowl	Syracuse	L 17–30
2003	Art Briles	Hawaii Bowl	Hawaii	L 48–54
2005	Art Briles	Fort Worth Bowl	Kansas	L 13–42
2006	Art Briles	Liberty Bowl	South Carolina	L 36–44
2007	Chris Thurmond (Note: Chris Thurmond served as interim head coach for the 2007 Texas Bowl after Art Briles resigned his position to take the head coach position with the Baylor Bears.)	Texas Bowl	TCU	L 13–20
2008	Kevin Sumlin	Armed Forces Bowl	Air Force	W 34–28
2009	Kevin Sumlin	Armed Forces Bowl	Air Force	L 20–47
2011	Tony Levine	TicketCity Bowl	Penn State	W 30–14
2013	Tony Levine	BBVA Compass Bowl	Vanderbilt	L 24–41
2014	David Gibbs (Note: David Gibbs served as interim head coach for the 2015 Armed Forces Bowl after Tony Levine was fired from his position as head coach.)	Armed Forces Bowl	Pittsburgh	W 35–34
2015	Tom Herman	Peach Bowl †	Florida State	W 38–24
2016	Major Applewhite	Las Vegas Bowl	San Diego State	L 10–34
2017	Major Applewhite	Hawaii Bowl	Fresno State	L 27–33
2018	Major Applewhite	Armed Forces Bowl	Army	L 14–70
2020	Dana Holgorsen	New Mexico Bowl	Hawaii	L 14–28
2021	Dana Holgorsen	Birmingham Bowl	Auburn	W 17–13
2022	Dana Holgorsen	Independence Bowl	Louisiana	W 23–16
2025	Willie Fritz	Texas Bowl	LSU	W 38–35

† New Year's Six

== Top 25 finishes ==
The Houston Cougars have finished ranked in the AP Poll, Coaches Poll, or the BCS/CFP rankings 19 times in the program's history, with the highest-ranked finishes being No. 4 in 1976, No. 5 in 1979, and No. 8 in 2015. Note: The AP Poll began in 1936, and the Coaches' Poll began in 1950. Before 1990, only the top 20 teams were ranked in the AP Poll before it was expanded to 25.

In addition to the major polls, the BCS produced rankings from 1998 to 2013 which helped select teams for the BCS Bowls. Then, starting in 2014, the CFP committee began issuing rankings to determine which teams were selected for the playoffs. Lastly, the Dokter-Entropy and Howell computer polls have been run since the 1940s. The best Cougar computer poll ranking is noted below.

Season	Record	Major Polls		Others
Season	Record	AP Poll	Coaches Poll	BCS (1998–2013) or CFP (2014–present)
1952	8–2		19	
1966	8–2		17	
1967	7–3		19	
1968	6–2–2	18	20	
1969	9–2	12	16	
1970	8–3	19	13	
1971	9–3	17	14	
1973	11–1	9	13	
1974	8–3–1	19	11	
1976	10–2	4	4	
1978	9–3	10	11	
1979	11–1	5	5	
1988	9–3	18		
1989	9–2	14		
1990	10–1	10		
2011	13–1	18	14	19
2015	13–1	8	8	18
2021	12–2	17	17	20
2025	10–3	22	19	21

== Facilities ==
=== Houston Public School Stadium • Jeppesen Stadium • Robertson Stadium ===
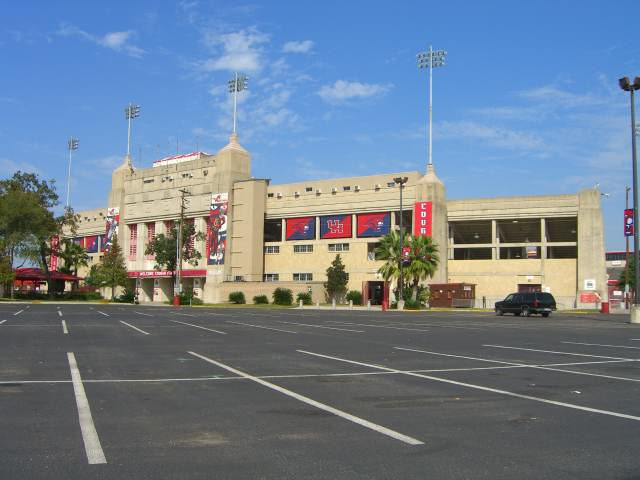
Robertson Stadium, the Cougars' former home stadium

From the program's inception until the end of the 1950 season, the Cougars played their home games in the Houston Public School Stadium, which would later be renamed to Jeppesen Stadium, and eventually Robertson Stadium in 1980 until its demolition. However, with the exception of occasional single games in the 1995 and 1996 seasons, the Cougars did not return to the stadium until the 1998 season following renovations. This remained their home stadium through the 2012 season; demolition began shortly afterwards to make way for a new stadium at the same site. From 2006 to 2011, the stadium was also home to Houston's Major League Soccer team, the Houston Dynamo.

=== Houston Stadium • Rice Stadium ===
In 1951, Houston Stadium, later known as Rice Stadium, a stadium subsidized by the city of Houston, opened. Until 1964, the Cougars played their home games at Rice Stadium along with Rice University. During this time, President John F. Kennedy gave his famous address regarding the nation's space effort at the stadium.

=== Astrodome ===
In 1965, the Astrodome was officially opened, and the Cougars moved in the same year. In 1968, the Bluebonnet Bowl also changed its location to the stadium, and the Cougars regularly began to participate in the bowl. After the 1997 season, following renovations, the Cougars moved back into Robertson Stadium. The Astrodome remains the team's longest serving home stadium.

=== Reliant Stadium • NRG Stadium ===
While TDECU Stadium was under construction during the 2013 season, the Cougars played five of their seven home games at Reliant Stadium (also known as NRG Stadium). The other two home games in 2013 were played at BBVA Compass Stadium. In 2016, Houston again played at NRG Stadium, where they defeated Oklahoma in front of a crowd of 71,016. The Cougars lost to Washington State in 2019 as part of the AdvoCare Texas Kickoff in front of a crowd of 40,523.

=== TDECU Stadium ===
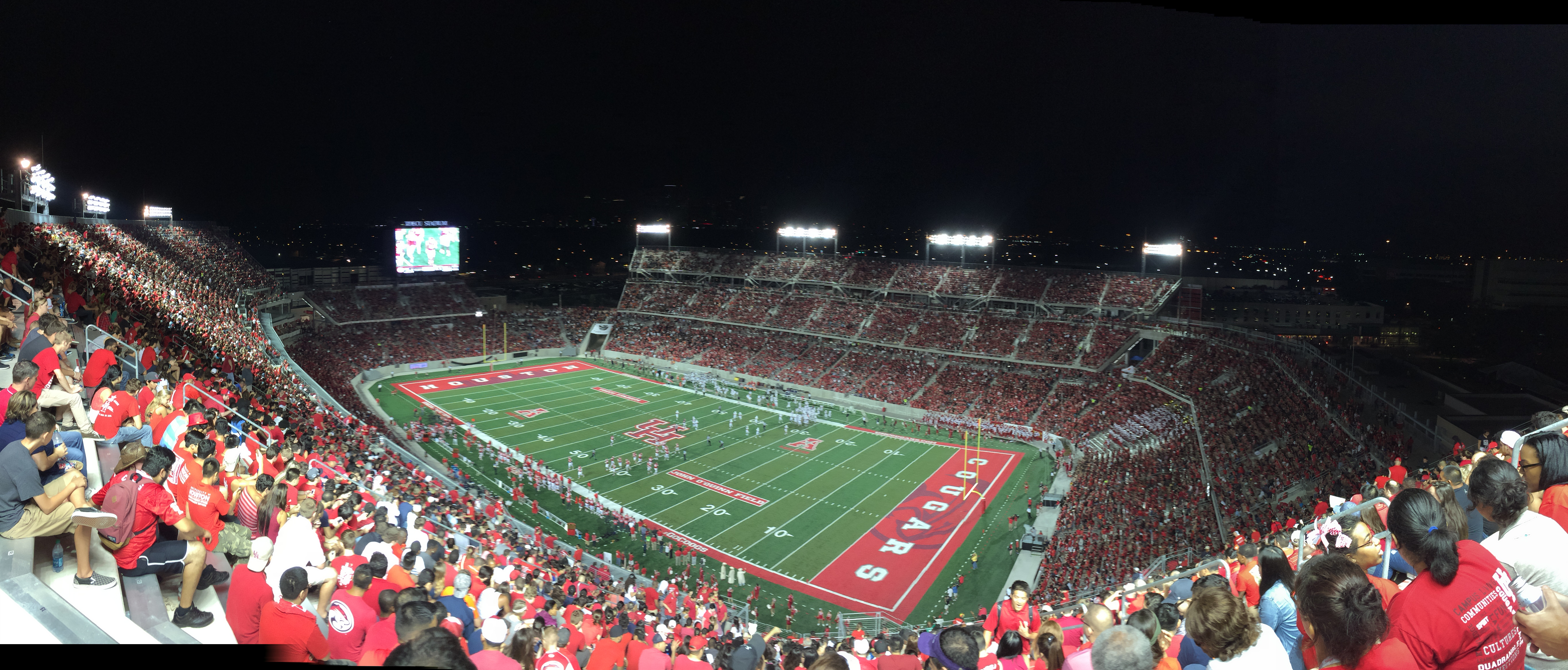
Night panorama of TDECU Stadium

TDECU Stadium is the Cougars' present stadium. The groundbreaking for the project occurred on February 8, 2013, and the Cougars moved in for the 2014 season. The cost to build the stadium was $128 million. It was built upon the former Robertson Stadium site.

== History and traditions ==
=== The Cougar Paw ===
The Cougar hand-sign's (known as the Cougar Paw) origin dates back to 1953 and the rivalry with the University of Texas. While traveling to Austin, the live Cougar mascot "Shasta" had a toe severed in a cage door. Prior to the game, several opposing players and fans noticed the injury and began taunting UH players by holding up their hands with the ring finger bent to their palm, suggesting the Cougars were weak opponents. The Cougar faithful, remembering the defeat 15 years later, utilized the hand sign in a 20–20 tie in 1968 and believed it played a major role in the contest. When UH entered the Southwest Conference in 1976, the Cougars defeated the Longhorns in Austin, 30–0, cementing the rally cry for the Cougars. Tradition tells Cougar faithful the paw is extended on the right hand to demonstrate pride amongst the University of Houston community.

== Uniforms ==
Houston has traditionally stayed consistent with their uniform design—scarlet jerseys, white pants, and a scarlet helmet with an interlocking UH logo. However, they switched from adidas to Nike in 2008 and then in 2011 began rolling out alternate uniform designs. For the 2011 homecoming, Houston wore a "throwback" uniform against Marshall to honor the Bill Yeoman era during the Golden Age of Houston football. The uniforms were auctioned after the game and raised nearly $60,000 for the Cougar Pride and UH Alumni Association. For the 2012 homecoming football game, Houston wore gray football uniforms for the first time in school history and every helmet had a new Cougar head logo and the number 2 on it to honor the injured D. J. Hayden.

In 2013, Houston revealed a new uniform template that was drastically different from previous designs with shoulders that were the opposite color of the jersey. For the first time in school history, UH released new white helmets for the 2013 season. Houston also had a Thursday night game on ESPN against the USF Bulls that happened to fall on Halloween and Nike designed a special alternate Halloween uniform for the game.

== Rivalries ==
Rice is Houston's closest rival, with the Bayou Bucket trophy being awarded to the winner of the crosstown rivalry game. They are also Houston's most played opponent. More recently, over the years in C-USA and the AAC, a rivalry has developed with Memphis.

Other rivals include former Southwest Conference foes TCU, Texas, and Texas A&M.

=== Rice ===
Houston leads Rice in the series 35–12 through the 2025 season. The first official game between the teams was played in 1971 when Houston joined the now-defunct Southwest Conference of which Rice was also a member. The teams previously met in a 1946 scrimmage marking Houston's inaugural season. For many years the competition included an annual regular-season football game between the schools. The winner of the game receives the Bayou Bucket, which is a full-sized trophy with a golden bucket on top.

=== Texas Tech ===
The series is tied 18–18–1 through the 2026 season. After having received an invitation in September 2021, Houston announced that they would join the Big 12 Conference on July 1, 2023, which meant that the rivalry would resume as a conference game for the first time since the breakup of the Southwest Conference.

=== Baylor ===
The series is tied 15–15–1 through the 2025 season.

=== Dormant Rivalries ===
==== SMU ====
Houston leads SMU in the series 22–14–1 through the 2025 season. Later, with the two schools moving to separate conferences due to the 2020s conference realignment — Houston to the Big 12 Conference in 2023 and SMU to the Atlantic Coast Conference in 2024 — the future of the rivalry is now dormant for the time being.

== Individual awards ==
=== National Coach of the Year award winners ===
Football Writers Association of America First-Year Coach of the Year Award

- Tom Herman – 2015

=== National Player award winners ===
Heisman Trophy

- Andre Ware – 1989

Davey O'Brien Award

- Andre Ware – 1989

UPI College Football Player of the Year

- Andre Ware – 1989

Sammy Baugh Trophy

- David Klingler – 1990
- Case Keenum – 2009 & 2011

Paul Hornung Award

- Marcus Jones – 2021

Jet Award

- Marcus Jones – 2021

Knute Rockne Memorial Trophy

- Wilson Whitley – 1976

Lombardi Award

- Wilson Whitley – 1976

Earl Campbell Tyler Rose Award

- Greg Ward Jr. – 2015

Bill Willis Trophy

- Ed Oliver – 2016

Outland Trophy

- Ed Oliver – 2017

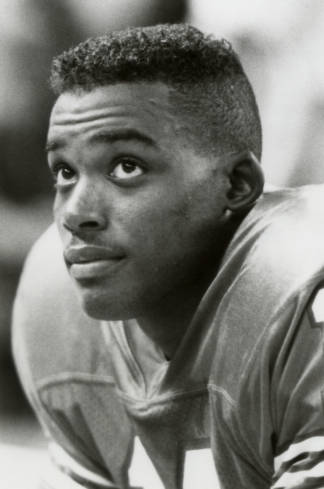
Andre Ware, Houston's Heisman Trophy winner, and a College Football Hall of Fame inductee

=== First-team All-Americans ===
The NCAA recognizes All-Americans selected by the Associated Press (AP), American Football Coaches Association (AFCA), Football Writers Association of America (FWAA), The Sporting News (TSN), and the Walter Camp Football Foundation (WCFF) to determine if a player is regarded as a Consensus or Unanimous All-American. To be selected a Consensus All-American, a player must be chosen to the first team on at least three of the five official selectors as recognized by the NCAA. If a player is named an All-American by all five organizations, he is recognized as a Unanimous All-American. Houston players have been honored 23 times as First-Team All-Americans and 10 times as Consensus All-Americans. No Houston players have been honored as Unanimous All-Americans yet.

==== Key ====
^{‡}	Unanimous selection
^{†}	Consensus selection

AFCA	American Football Coaches Association	NEA	Newspaper Enterprise Association
AP	Associated Press	TSN	The Sporting News
CP	Central Press Association	UPI	United Press International
FWAA	Football Writers Association of America	WC/WCFF	Walter Camp Football Foundation

Year	Player	Position	Selector(s)
1952	J. D. Kimmel	DT	AP
1958	Hogan Wharton	OT	AFCA
1967	Ken Hebert	WR	FWAA
1967	Rich Stotter†	OG	AFCA, AP, CP, NEA, UPI
1968	Paul Gipson	RB	AFCA, NEA
1969	Bill Bridges†	OG	AFCA, AP, FWAA
1970	Elmo Wright†	WR	AP, FWAA, NEA
1974	Robert Giblin	DB	AFCA
1974	Mack Mitchell	DE	WC
1976	Wilson Whitley†	DT	AFCA, AP, FWAA
1979	David Hodge	LB	AFCA
1979	Melvin Jones	OG	AFCA
1980	Leonard Mitchell†	DT	AFCA, AP, UPI
1980	Hosea Taylor	DT	FWAA
1988	Jason Phillips†	WR	AFCA, AP, UPI, FWAA
1989	Manny Hazard	WR	AP
1989	Andre Ware†	QB	AP, FWAA, UPI, WCFF
1997	Ben Fricke	C	FWAA
2016	Ed Oliver	DT	AP, TSN
2017	Ed Oliver†	DT	AFCA, FWAA, WCFF
2018	Ed Oliver†	DT	FWAA, WCFF
2020	Marcus Jones	AP/RS	FWAA
2021	Marcus Jones†	DB/AP/RS	AP, FWAA, TSN

=== Conference Offensive Player of the Year ===
Year	Player	Position	Conference
1978	Danny Davis	QB	Southwest
1988†	Jason Phillips	WR	Southwest
1989	Andre Ware	QB	Southwest
1990	David Klingler	QB	Southwest
1996	Antowain Smith	RB	C-USA
2006	Kevin Kolb	QB	C-USA
2008	Case Keenum	QB	C-USA
2011	Patrick Edwards	WR	C-USA

† co-Offensive Player of the Year

=== Conference Defensive Player of the Year ===
Year	Player	Position	Conference
1976	Wilson Whitley	DT	Southwest
2000†	Wayne Rogers	LB	C-USA
2008	Phillip Hunt	DE	C-USA
2017	Ed Oliver	DT	The American

† co-Defensive Player of the Year

=== Conference Coach of the Year ===
Year	Coach	Conference
1956	Bill Meek	Missouri Valley
1957	Hal Lahar	Missouri Valley
1976†	Bill Yeoman	Southwest
1979	Bill Yeoman	Southwest
1984	Bill Yeoman	Southwest
1996	Kim Helton	C-USA
2006†	Art Briles	C-USA
2009	Kevin Sumlin	C-USA
2011	Kevin Sumlin	C-USA
2015†	Tom Herman	The American

† co-Coach of the Year

=== Conference Special Teams Player of the Year ===
Year	Player	Position	Conference
2011	Tyron Carrier	RS	C-USA
2013†	Demarcus Ayers	RS	The American
2019†	Dane Roy	P	The American
2021	Marcus Jones	RS	The American

† co-Special Teams Player of the Year

== Individual honors ==
=== College Football Hall of Fame inductees ===
The following Houston players and coaches have been enshrined in the College Football Hall of Fame.

Year Inducted	Name	Position	Tenure	Ref.
2001	Bill Yeoman	Coach	1962–1986	
2004	Andre Ware	QB	1987–1989	
2007	Wilson Whitley	DT	1973–1976	
2020	Elmo Wright	WR	1968–1970	

== Retired numbers ==
The Cougars have retired three numbers. Each of the four players has met at least one of the requirements (induction into the College Football Hall of Fame, winning a major national award, being a Consensus All-American, selection as Most Valuable Player/Player of the Year in his conference, winning an All-Conference First Team honor for three years, or holding at least five NCAA records for at least ten years).

Houston Cougars retired numbers
No.	Player	Pos.	Tenure	Ref.
7	David Klingler	QB	1988–1991	
7	Case Keenum	QB	2006–2011	
11	Andre Ware	QB	1987–1989	
23	Elmo Wright	WR	1968–1970	
78	Wilson Whitley	DT	1973–1976	

== Future non-conference opponents ==
Announced schedules as of April 25, 2025.

2026	2027	2028	2029	2030	2031
Oregon State	vs LSU	Sam Houston		at Boise State	Boise State
Southern	Prairie View A&M	at UNLV			
at Georgia Southern	Georgia Southern	Oklahoma			
