= Tulane Green Wave football statistical leaders =

List of statistical leaders of the Tulane Green Wave football program

The Tulane Green Wave football statistical leaders are individual statistical leaders of the Tulane Green Wave football program in various categories, including passing, rushing, receiving, total offense, defensive stats, and kicking. Within those areas, the lists identify single-game, single-season, and career leaders. The Green Wave represent Tulane University in the NCAA Division I FBS American Conference.

Although Tulane began competing in intercollegiate football in 1893, the school's official record book considers the "modern era" to have begun in 1939. Records from before this year are often incomplete and inconsistent, and they are generally not included in these lists.

These lists are dominated by more recent players for several reasons:

- Since 1939, seasons have increased from 10 games to 11 and then 12 games in length.
- The NCAA didn't allow freshmen to play varsity football until 1972 (with the exception of the World War II years), allowing players to have four-year careers.
- Bowl games only began counting toward single-season and career statistics in 2002. The Green Wave have since played in seven bowl games and will play an eighth in 2024, giving players in those seasons an extra game to accumulate statistics.
- Tulane played in the American Conference championship game in 2022 and 2023, and will play again in 2024, giving players in those seasons yet another game to amass statistics.
- Eight of Tulane's nine highest seasons in total offensive yards have come since 1998.

These lists are updated through the 2025 regular season.

== Passing ==
=== Passing yards ===
Career
Rank	Player	Yards	Years
1	Michael Pratt	9,603	2020 2021 2022 2023
2	Patrick Ramsey	9,205	1998 1999 2000 2001
3	Ryan Griffin	9,026	2009 2010 2011 2012
4	Shaun King	8,419	1995 1996 1997 1998
5	Terrence Jones	7,684	1985 1986 1987 1988
6	J. P. Losman	6,754	2000 2001 2002 2003
7	Lester Ricard	6,608	2004 2005 2006
8	Roch Hontas	5,669	1976 1977 1978 1979
9	Deron Smith	4,190	1987 1988 1989 1990
10	Justin McMillan	3,748	2018 2019

Single season
Rank	Player	Yards	Year
1	Patrick Ramsey	3,410	1999
2	Shaun King	3,232	1998
3	Jake Retzlaff	3,168	2025
4	J. P. Losman	3,077	2003
5	Michael Pratt	3,010	2022
6	Patrick Ramsey	2,935	2001
7	Patrick Ramsey	2,833	2000
8	Lester Ricard	2,795	2006
9	Ryan Griffin	2,771	2012
10	Darian Mensah	2,723	2024

Single game
Rank	Player	Yards	Year	Opponent
1	Ryan Griffin	476	2012	Rice
2	Ryan Griffin	466	2012	UAB
3	Patrick Ramsey	447	1999	Army
4	Patrick Ramsey	442	2001	Navy
5	Lester Ricard	417	2004	UAB
6	Ryan Griffin	412	2010	Tulsa
7	Lester Ricard	409	2006	Army
8	Patrick Ramsey	404	1999	SMU
9	Patrick Ramsey	403	2000	UL-Lafayette
10	Patrick Ramsey	396	1999	UL-Lafayette

=== Passing touchdowns ===
Career
Rank	Player	TDs	Years
1	Michael Pratt	90	2020 2021 2022 2023
2	Patrick Ramsey	72	1998 1999 2000 2001
3	Shaun King	70	1995 1996 1997 1998
4	J. P. Losman	60	2000 2001 2002 2003
5	Ryan Griffin	56	2009 2010 2011 2012
6	Lester Ricard	55	2004 2005 2006
7	Terrence Jones	46	1985 1986 1987 1988
8	Roch Hontas	39	1976 1977 1978 1979
9	Deron Smith	37	1987 1988 1989 1990
10	Justin McMillan	27	2018 2019

Single season
Rank	Player	TDs	Year
1	Shaun King	36	1998
2	J. P. Losman	33	2003
3	Michael Pratt	27	2022
4	Patrick Ramsey	25	1999
5	Shaun King	24	1997
	Patrick Ramsey	24	2000
7	Patrick Ramsey	22	2001
	Michael Pratt	22	2023
	Darian Mensah	22	2024
10	Roch Hontas	21	1979
	Nickie Hall	21	1980
	Lester Ricard	21	2004
	Michael Pratt	21	2021

Single game
Rank	Player	TDs	Year	Opponent
1	Lester Ricard	6	2004	UAB
2	Fred Dempsey	5	1952	Louisiana College
	Nickie Hall	5	1980	Rice
	Deron Smith	5	1989	Memphis
	Shaun King	5	1998	Houston
	Patrick Ramsey	5	1999	UL-Lafayette
	Patrick Ramsey	5	2000	Navy
	J. P. Losman	5	2002	Navy
	J. P. Losman	5	2003	Army
	Ryan Griffin	5	2012	UAB

== Rushing ==
=== Rushing yards ===
Career
Rank	Player	Yards	Years
1	Mewelde Moore	4,364	2000 2001 2002 2003
2	Matt Forte	4,265	2004 2005 2006 2007
3	Eddie Price	3,095	1946 1947 1948 1949
4	Orleans Darkwa	2,953	2010 2011 2012 2013
5	Tyjae Spears	2,910	2019 2020 2021 2022
6	Makhi Hughes	2,779	2023 2024
7	Bill Banker	2,516	1927 1928 1929
8	Don Zimmerman	2,369	1930 1931 1932
9	Jamaican Dartez	2,284	1995 1996 1997 1998
10	Marvin Christian	2,152	1977 1978 1979

Single season
Rank	Player	Yards	Year
1	Matt Forte	2,127	2007
2	Tyjae Spears	1,581	2022
3	Mewelde Moore	1,421	2001
4	Makhi Hughes	1,401	2024
5	Makhi Hughes	1,378	2023
6	Eddie Price	1,178	1948
7	Mewelde Moore	1,138	2002
8	Eddie Price	1,137	1949
9	Darius Bradwell	1,134	2018
10	André Anderson	1,016	2009

Single game
Rank	Player	Yards	Year	Opponent
1	Matt Forte	342	2007	SMU
2	Matt Forte	303	2007	Southeastern Louisiana
3	Matt Forte	278	2007	Memphis
4	Tyjae Spears	264	2021	Memphis
5	André Anderson	255	2008	UTEP
6	Mewelde Moore	249	2001	Cincinnati
7	David Abercrombie	246	1970	N.C. State
8	Eddie Price	238	1949	Navy
9	André Anderson	219	2008	SMU
10	Matt Forte	216	2004	Army

=== Rushing touchdowns ===
Career
Rank	Player	TDs	Years
1	Matt Forte	39	2004 2005 2006 2007
	Orleans Darkwa	39	2010 2011 2012 2013
3	Bill Banker	31	1927 1928 1929
	Tyjae Spears	31	2019 2020 2021 2022
5	Eddie Price	30	1946 1947 1948 1949
6	Michael Pratt	28	2020 2021 2022 2023
7	Jamaican Dartez	25	1995 1996 1997 1998
8	Charles Flournoy	24	1923 1924 1925
	Don Zimmerman	24	1930 1931 1932
	Terrence Jones	24	1985 1986 1987 1988

Single season
Rank	Player	TDs	Year
1	Matt Forte	23	2007
2	Tyjae Spears	19	2022
3	Jake Retzlaff	16	2025
4	Makhi Hughes	15	2024
5	Orleans Darkwa	13	2011
6	Orleans Darkwa	12	2013
	Justin McMillan	12	2019
	Cameron Carroll	12	2020
9	Eddie Price	11	1949
	Orleans Darkwa	11	2010
	Darius Bradwell	11	2018

Single game
Rank	Player	TDs	Year	Opponent
1	Matt Forte	5	2007	Southeastern Louisiana
	Matt Forte	5	2007	Rice
3	Charles Flournoy	4	1925	Louisiana Tech
	Toney Converse	4	1998	Louisiana Tech
	Matt Forte	4	2007	SMU
	André Anderson	4	2009	McNeese State
	Tyjae Spears	4	2022	USC (Cotton Bowl)
	Jake Retzlaff	4	2025	Duke

== Receiving ==
=== Receptions ===
Career
Rank	Player	Rec	Years
1	Marc Zeno	236	1984 1985 1986 1987
2	JaJuan Dawson	234	1996 1997 1998 1999
3	Roydell Williams	215	2000 2001 2002 2003
4	Jeremy Williams	197	2006 2007 2008 2009
5	Ryan Grant	196	2009 2010 2011 2012
6	Mewelde Moore	189	2000 2001 2002 2003
7	Wil Ursin	188	1990 1991 1992 1993
8	Adrian Burnette	170	1997 1998 1999 2000
9	Terrell Harris	166	1998 1999 2000 2001
10	P.J. Franklin	158	1995 1996 1997 1998

Single season
Rank	Player	Rec	Year
1	JaJuan Dawson	96	1999
2	Jeremy Williams	84	2009
3	Adrian Burnette	79	1999
4	Marc Zeno	77	1987
	Ryan Grant	77	2013
6	Ryan Grant	76	2012
7	P.J. Franklin	74	1998
	Adrian Burnette	74	2000
9	Marc Zeno	73	1985
10	Wil Ursin	70	1991

Single game
Rank	Player	Rec	Year	Opponent
1	JaJuan Dawson	16	1999	SMU
2	Wil Ursin	15	1991	East Carolina
	JaJuan Dawson	15	1999	Mississippi
4	Ryan Grant	14	2013	South Alabama
5	Marc Zeno	13	1985	LSU
	Roydell Williams	13	2001	East Carolina
	Ryan Grant	13	2012	Houston
8	Marc Zeno	12	1985	Mississippi
	Marc Zeno	12	1987	UL-Lafayette
	P.J. Franklin	12	1998	Rutgers
	Adrian Burnette	12	2000	Louisville

=== Receiving yards ===
Career
Rank	Player	Yards	Years
1	Marc Zeno	3,725	1984 1985 1986 1987
2	Roydell Williams	3,207	2000 2001 2002 2003 2004
3	JaJuan Dawson	3,048	1996 1997 1998 1999
4	Jeremy Williams	2,807	2006 2007 2008 2009
5	Ryan Grant	2,769	2009 2010 2011 2012 2013
6	Darnell Mooney	2,572	2016 2017 2018 2019
7	Wil Ursin	2,466	1990 1991 1992 1993
8	Adrian Burnette	2,459	1997 1998 1999 2000
9	P.J. Franklin	2,260	1995 1996 1997 1998
10	Jerome McIntosh	2,109	1986 1987 1988 1989

Single season
Rank	Player	Yards	Year
1	Marc Zeno	1,206	1987
2	P.J. Franklin	1,174	1998
3	Ryan Grant	1,149	2012
4	Marc Zeno	1,137	1985
5	Jeremy Williams	1,113	2009
6	Adrian Burnette	1,095	1999
7	Adrian Burnette	1,075	2000
8	Roydell Williams	1,066	2003
9	JaJuan Dawson	1,051	1999
10	Ryan Grant	1,039	2013

Single game
Rank	Player	Yards	Year	Opponent
1	Jerome McIntosh	271	1989	Vanderbilt
2	Marc Zeno	238	1987	UL-Lafayette
3	Jeremy Williams	222	2009	McNeese State
4	JaJuan Dawson	218	1999	SMU
5	Marc Zeno	208	1985	LSU
6	Wil Ursin	206	1991	East Carolina
7	JaJuan Dawson	204	1997	Syracuse
8	Marc Zeno	191	1986	TCU
9	Adrian Burnette	191	2000	UL-Lafayette
10	Jeremy Williams	188	2007	UTEP

=== Receiving touchdowns ===
Career
Rank	Player	TDs	Years
1	Roydell Williams	35	2000 2001 2002 2003 2004
2	JaJuan Dawson	31	1996 1997 1998 1999
3	Marc Zeno	25	1984 1985 1986 1987
4	Adrian Burnette	24	1997 1998 1999 2000
5	Jerome McIntosh	23	1986 1987 1988 1989
6	Ryan Grant	21	2009 2010 2011 2012 2013
	P.J. Franklin	21	1995 1996 1997 1998
8	Jeremy Williams	19	2006 2007 2008 2009
	Darnell Mooney	19	2016 2017 2018 2019
10	Wil Ursin	17	1990 1991 1992 1993
	Duece Watts	17	2020 2021 2022
	Jha'Quan Jackson	17	2019 2020 2021 2022 2023

Single season
Rank	Player	TDs	Year
1	Adrian Burnette	14	2000
2	Marc Zeno	13	1987
3	JaJuan Dawson	12	1998
	Roydell Williams	12	2004
5	P.J. Franklin	11	1998
	Roydell Williams	11	2001
7	Robert Griffin	10	1980
	JaJuan Dawson	10	1997
9	Wil Ursin	9	1991
	Roydell Williams	9	2003
	Ryan Grant	9	2013

Single game
Rank	Player	TDs	Year	Opponent
1	Jerome McIntosh	3	1998	Florida State
	Wil Ursin	3	1991	East Carolina
	Wil Ursin	3	1991	Navy
	JaJuan Dawson	3	1997	Army
	Adrian Burnette	3	1999	SMU
	Adrian Burnette	3	2000	Memphis
	Roydell Williams	3	2001	Navy
	Mewelde Moore	3	2003	Northwestern State
	Roydell Williams	3	2004	Memphis
	Roydell Williams	3	2004	UAB
	Terren Encalade	3	2016	Louisiana-Lafayette

== Total offense ==
Total offense is the sum of passing and rushing statistics. It does not include receiving or returns.

=== Total offense yards ===
Career
Rank	Player	Yards	Years
1	Michael Pratt	10,748	2020 2021 2022 2023
2	Shaun King	9,468	1995 1996 1997 1998
3	Terrence Jones	9,445	1985 1986 1987 1988
4	Patrick Ramsey	9,075	1998 1999 2000 2001
5	Ryan Griffin	8,684	2009 2010 2011 2012
6	J. P. Losman	6,995	2000 2001 2002 2003
7	Lester Ricard	6,406	2004 2005 2006
8	Roch Hontas	5,668	1976 1977 1978 1979
9	Deron Smith	5,120	1987 1988 1989 1990
10	Mewelde Moore	4,378	2000 2001 2002 2003

Single season
Rank	Player	Yards	Year
1	Jake Retzlaff	3,802	2025
2	Shaun King	3,764	1998
3	Michael Pratt	3,488	2022
4	Patrick Ramsey	3,349	1999
5	J. P. Losman	3,157	2003
6	Shaun King	3,078	1997
7	Terrence Jones	2,934	1987
8	Patrick Ramsey	2,886	2000
9	Darian Mensah	2,855	2024
10	Patrick Ramsey	2,820	2001

Single game
Rank	Player	Yards	Year	Opponent
1	Terrence Jones	484	1986	TCU
2	Ryan Griffin	469	2012	UAB
3	Shaun King	465	1998	Army
	Ryan Griffin	465	2012	Rice
5	Patrick Ramsey	461	1999	Army
6	Michael Pratt	442	2022	UCF (American Conference Championship Game)
7	Patrick Ramsey	439	2001	Navy
8	Lester Ricard	433	2004	UAB
9	Shaun King	422	1998	Louisiana Tech
10	Lester Ricard	419	2006	Army

=== Touchdowns responsible for ===
"Touchdowns responsible for" is the NCAA's official term for combined passing and rushing touchdowns.

Career
Rank	Player	TDs	Years
1	Michael Pratt	118	2020 2021 2022 2023
2	Shaun King	89	1995 1996 1997 1998
3	Patrick Ramsey	76	1998 1999 2000 2001
4	J. P. Losman	70	2000 2001 2002 2003
	Terrence Jones	70	1985 1986 1987 1988
6	Ryan Griffin	57	2009 2010 2011 2012
7	Lester Ricard	55	2004 2005 2006
8	Roch Hontas	44	1976 1977 1978 1979
9	Deron Smith	43	1987 1988 1989 1990
10	Matt Forte	39	2004 2005 2006 2007
	Orleans Darkwa	39	2010 2011 2012 2013

Single season
Rank	Player	TDs	Year
1	Shaun King	46	1998
2	Michael Pratt	37	2022
3	J. P. Losman	35	2003
4	Jake Retzlaff	31	2025
5	Shaun King	29	1997
6	Nickie Hall	28	1980
	Terrence Jones	28	1987
	Michael Pratt	28	2020
9	Michael Pratt	27	2023
10	Patrick Ramsey	26	1999
	Patrick Ramsey	26	2000
	Michael Pratt	26	2021

Single game
Rank	Player	TDs	Year	Opponent
1	Shaun King	6	1998	Rutgers
	Shaun King	6	1998	Army
	Lester Ricard	6	2004	UAB
	Michael Pratt	6	2022	SMU

== Defense ==
=== Interceptions ===
Career
Rank	Player	Ints	Years
1	Paul Ellis	18	1969 1970 1971
2	Lorenzo Doss	15	2012 2013 2014
3	Lynaris Elpheage	14	2000 2001 2002
4	Mitchell Price	13	1987 1988 1989
5	Don Zimmerman	12	1930 1931 1932
	Ellsworth Kingery	12	1949 1950 1951
7	David Skehan	11	2005 2006 2007 2008
8	Lou Thomas	10	1940 1941 1942
	Bobby Jones	10	1947 1948 1949 1950
	Homer Dedeaux	10	1947 1948 1949 1950

Single season
Rank	Player	Ints	Year
1	Jimmy Glisson	9	1949
	Paul Ellis	9	1970
3	Les Kennedy	8	1951
	Joe Bullard	8	1970
	Lynaris Elpheage	8	2002
6	Lorenzo Doss	7	2013
7	George Kinek	6	1950
	Parry Nickerson	6	2014

Single game
Rank	Player	Ints	Year	Opponent
1	Jimmy Glisson	4	1949	Virginia

=== Tackles ===
Career
Rank	Player	Tackles	Years
1	Burnell Dent	492	1982 1983 1984 1985
2	Mike Staid	481	1991 1992 1993 1994
3	Frank Robinson	442	1977 1978 1979 1980
4	Anthony Cannon	437	2002 2003 2004 2005
5	Wilfred Simon	413	1977 1978 1979 1980
6	Marty Wetzel	392	1977 1978 1979 1980
7	Ray Hester	369	1968 1969 1970
8	Brian Williams	367	1994 1995 1996 1997
9	Rick Kingrea	351	1968 1969 1970
10	Jerry Phillips	344	1997 1998 1999 2000

Single season
Rank	Player	Tackles	Year
1	Burnell Dent	172	1983
2	Rick Kingrea	171	1970
3	Frank Robinson	167	1980
4	Jim Gueno	166	1975
5	David Jackson	163	1983
6	Mike Mullen	162	1971
7	John Ammerman	161	1976
8	Rusty Chambers	153	1973
9	Ray Hester	152	1970
10	Rick Kingrea	145	1969

=== Sacks ===
Career
Rank	Player	Sacks	Years
1	Patrick Johnson	24.5	2017 2018 2019 2020
2	Kenan Blackmon	22.5	1999 2000 2001 2002
3	Floyd Dorsey	21.5	1999 2000 2001 2002
4	Royce LaFrance	20.0	2012 2013 2014 2015
5	Darius Hodges	18.5	2020 2021 2022 2023
6	Mark Olivari	16.0	1973 1974 1975
7	Dezman Moses	15.5	2010 2011
8	Brian Douglas	15.0	1978 1979 1980 1981
9	Julius Warmsley	14.5	2010 2011 2012 2013
10	Antonio Harris	14.0	2004 2005 2006 2007
	Logan Kelley	14.0	2006 2007 2008 2009

Single season
Rank	Player	Sacks	Year
1	Mark Olivari	14.0	1973
2	Brian Douglas	11.0	1981
3	Patrick Johnson	10.5	2018
4	Patrick Johnson	10.0	2020
5	Floyd Dorsey	9.5	2002
	Dezman Moses	9.5	2011
7	Keaton Cromartie	9.0	1997
8	Fred Davis	8.0	1987
	Kenan Blackmon	8.0	2001
	Harvey Dyson	8.0	2025

== Kicking ==
=== Field goals made ===
Career
Rank	Player	FGs	Years
1	Seth Marler	66	1999 2000 2001 2002
2	Cairo Santos	61	2010 2011 2012 2013
3	Brad Palazzo	48	1995 1996 1997 1998
4	Merek Glover	46	2017 2018 2019 2020 2021
5	Eddie Murray	45	1976 1977 1978 1979
6	Tony Wood	42	1981 1982 1983 1984
7	Ross Thevenot	40	2006 2007 2008 2009
8	Todd Wiggins	34	1987 1988 1989
9	Valentino Ambrosio	32	2022 2023
10	Andrew DiRocco	27	2014 2015 2016
	Patrick Durkin	27	2024 2025

Single season
Rank	Player	FGs	Year
1	Patrick Durkin	25	2025
2	Brad Palazzo	23	1997
3	Cairo Santos	21	2012
	Valentino Ambrosio	21	2023
5	Seth Marler	20	2002
6	Seth Marler	16	2000
	Cairo Santos	16	2013
8	Wayne Clements	15	1985
	Seth Marler	15	1999
	Seth Marler	15	2001

Single game
Rank	Player	FGs	Year	Opponent
1	Bart Baldwin	5	1994	East Carolina
	Brad Palazzo	5	1997	Louisville
	Cairo Santos	5	2013	Rice
	Patrick Durkin	5	2025	Temple

=== Field goal percentage ===
Tulane's record book specifies a minimum of 10 made to qualify for its career leaderboard, and a minimum of 7 made to qualify for its season leaderboard.

Career
Rank	Player	FG%	Years
1	Patrick Durkin	84.4%	2024 2025
2	Valentino Ambrosio	84.2%	2022 2023
3	Cairo Santos	78.2%	2010 2011 2012 2013
4	Brad Palazzo	72.7%	1995 1996 1997 1998
5	Seth Marler	72.5%	1999 2000 2001 2002
6	Merek Glover	70.8%	2017 2018 2019 2020 2021
7	Tony Wood	66.7%	1981 1982 1983 1984
8	Andrew DiRocco	65.9%	2014 2015 2016
9	Eddie Murray	61.6%	1976 1977 1978 1979
10	Ross Thevenot	60.6%	2006 2007 2008 2009

Single season
Rank	Player	FG%	Year
1	Cairo Santos	100.0%	2012
2	Seth Marler	93.8%	2001
3	Valentino Ambrosio	91.7%	2022
4	Andrew DiRocco	90.0%	2015
5	Patrick Durkin	89.3%	2025
6	Merek Glover	88.9%	2017
7	Brad Palazzo	82.1%	1997
8	Cairo Santos	81.3%	2010
9	Valentino Ambrosio	80.6%	2023
10	Brad Palazzo	80.0%	1996
