= List of Tulane Green Wave in the NFL draft =

The Tulane Green Wave football team, representing Tulane University, has had 140 players drafted into the National Football League (NFL) since the league began holding drafts in 1936. (Note: Because of the NFL–AFL merger agreement, the history of the AFL is officially recognized by the NFL and therefore this list includes the AFL draft (1960–1966) and the common draft (1967–1969).) This includes four players taken in the first round, and one overall number one pick, Tommy Mason in 1961.

Each NFL franchise seeks to add new players through the annual NFL Draft. The NFL draft rules were last updated in 2009. The team with the worst record the previous year picks first, the next-worst team second, and so on. Teams that did not make the playoffs are ordered by their regular-season record with any remaining ties broken by strength of schedule. Playoff participants are sequenced after non-playoff teams, based on their round of elimination (wild card, division, conference, and Super Bowl).

Before 1966, the American Football League (AFL) operated in direct competition with the NFL and held a separate draft. This led to a massive bidding war over top prospects between the two leagues. As part of the merger agreement on June 8, 1966, the two leagues would hold a multiple round "common draft". Once the AFL officially merged with the NFL in 1970, the "common draft" simply became the NFL Draft.

Notably, this list does not include undrafted Tulane players that have played for the NFL (such as Rob Kelley or Cairo Santos).

== Key ==
B	Back	K	Kicker	NT	Nose tackle
C	Center	LB	Linebacker	FB	Fullback
DB	Defensive back	P	Punter	HB	Halfback
DE	Defensive end	QB	Quarterback	WR	Wide receiver
DT	Defensive tackle	RB	Running back	G	Guard
E	End	T	Offensive tackle	TE	Tight end

== Selections ==
Year	Round	Pick	Overall	Player	Team	Position
1937	4	2	32	Bucky Bryan	Chicago Cardinals	B
1939	8	3	63	Bronco Brunner	Cleveland Rams	B
1939	20	10	190	Lyle Smith	New York Giants	G
1940	2	2	12	Ralph Wenzel	Pittsburgh Steelers	E
1940	3	8	23	Buddy Banker	Washington Redskins	B
1940	5	8	38	Bill Kirchem	Washington Redskins	T
1940	7	9	59	Millard White	Green Bay Packers	T
1941	6	8	48	Tommy O'Boyle	Chicago Bears	G
1942	5	3	33	Ernie Blandin	Philadelphia Eagles	T
1942	6	6	46	Harley McCollum	Washington Redskins	T
1942	6	8	48	Bob Glass	New York Giants	B
1942	12	7	107	Jim Thibaut	Brooklyn Dodgers	FB
1943	5	4	34	Marty Comer	Brooklyn Dodgers	DE
1943	10	10	90	Walt McDonald	Washington Redskins	B
1943	12	3	103	Lou Thomas	Brooklyn Dodgers	B
1943	25	10	240	Roman Bentz	Washington Redskins	G
1944	5	11	43	Larry Rice	Boston Yanks	C
1945	1	3	3	Joe Renfroe	Boston Yanks	B
1945	8	6	71	Art Porter	Washington Redskins	E
1945	17	7	171	O. J. Key	Detroit Lions	B
1945	23	7	237	Ray Olsen	Detroit Lions	B
1946	1	2	2	Dub Jones	Chicago Cardinals	B
1946	5	2	32	Gaston Bourgeois	Boston Yanks	B
1946	22	2	202	Ike Iglehart	Boston Yanks	B
1947	30	1	276	Howard McAfee	Detroit Lions	T
1948	28	9	264	Bennie Ellender	Philadelphia Eagles	B
1949	17	6	167	Dick Sheffield	Los Angeles Rams	E
1950	2	6	20	Eddie Price	New York Giants	FB
1950	3	2	29	Bill Svoboda	Chicago Cardinals	LB
1950	9	7	112	Max Druen	Pittsburgh Steelers	T
1950	15	9	192	Jimmy Glisson	Chicago Bears	B
1950	17	10	219	Cliff Van Meter	San Francisco 49ers	B
1950	23	2	289	Dick Sheffield	New York Bulldogs	E
1951	2	3	18	Don Joyce	Chicago Cardinals	DE
1951	3	12	38	Jerry Helluin	Cleveland Browns	DT
1951	4	8	48	George Kinek	Los Angeles Rams	E
1951	6	12	74	Dan Rogas	Cleveland Browns	G
1951	7	10	84	Paul Lea	Chicago Bears	DT
1951	9	5	104	Denny Doyle	Philadelphia Eagles	G
1951	15	1	172	Joe Ernst	Green Bay Packers	B
1951	17	7	202	Hal Waggoner	Philadelphia Eagles	B
1951	30	8	359	Joe Shinn	New York Yanks	E
1952	5	2	51	Dick Fugler	Chicago Cardinals	T
1952	10	2	111	Art Kleinschmidt	Green Bay Packers	G
1952	25	12	301	Len Teeuws	Los Angeles Rams	DT
1953	14	7	164	Roy Bailey	Philadelphia Eagles	B
1953	23	1	266	Mike Housepian	Baltimore Colts	G
1953	23	10	275	Ronnie Kent	Cleveland Browns	B
1954	5	2	54	Max McGee	Green Bay Packers	B
1954	13	11	156	George Cummins	Cleveland Browns	T
1954	28	4	329	Jim Partridge	New York Giants	B
1955	16	6	187	Charley Coates	Los Angeles Rams	T
1955	30	3	352	Bob Saia	Green Bay Packers	B
1956	6	3	64	Tony Sardisco	San Francisco 49ers	G
1956	27	1	314	Bryan Burnthorne	Detroit Lions	G
1957	3	4	29	Dalton Truax	Green Bay Packers	T
1957	21	7	248	Fred Wilcox	San Francisco 49ers	B
1957	22	2	255	Ronnie Quillian	Green Bay Packers	QB
1957	26	12	313	Emmett Zelenka	New York Giants	G
1958	21	8	249	Charlie Hansen	New York Giants	C
1959	2	9	21	Richie Petitbon	Chicago Bears	DB
1959	6	9	69	Dave Painter	Los Angeles Rams	C
1959	28	11	335	Pete Abadie	Cleveland Browns	E
1959	29	4	340	Don Lockwood	Washington Redskins	G
1960	N/A	N/A	N/A	Bernie Darre	Denver Broncos	G
1960	N/A	N/A	N/A	Pete Abadie	New York Titans	E
1960	15	4	172	Bernie Darre	Washington Redskins	G
1961	1	1	1	Tommy Mason	Minnesota Vikings	RB
1961	1	2	2	Tommy Mason	Boston Patriots	RB
1961	3	12	40	Phil Nugent	Green Bay Packers	DB
1961	4	14	56	Joe LeSage	Green Bay Packers	G
1962	6	7	77	Gus Gonzales	Philadelphia Eagles	G
1962	7	7	55	Gus Gonzales	Houston Oilers	G
1962	8	7	105	Ed Reynolds	Chicago Bears	T
1962	9	1	65	Phil Nugent	Denver Broncos	DB
1962	12	1	155	Terry Terrebonne	Washington Redskins	RB
1962	12	13	167	Larry Thompson	Philadelphia Eagles	C
1962	19	7	259	Bill Kellum	Chicago Bears	T
1962	26	4	204	Ed Reynolds	Buffalo Bills	T
1963	13	14	182	Bill Kellum	Green Bay Packers	T
1963	17	4	228	Gordon Rush	Philadelphia Eagles	B
1966	8	1	111	Bill Goss	Atlanta Falcons	LB
1967	5	4	111	Pete Johns	Houston Oilers	DB
1968	3	15	70	Bobby Duhon	New York Giants	RB
1968	11	21	294	Tom Nosewicz	Kansas City Chiefs	DE
1969	2	16	42	Warren Bankston	Pittsburgh Steelers	RB
1971	11	24	284	Mike Walker	Minnesota Vikings	DE
1971	13	20	332	David Abercrombie	Detroit Lions	RB
1971	14	14	352	Rick Kingrea	Cleveland Browns	LB
1971	15	2	366	Bart Graves	New Orleans Saints	T
1972	6	4	134	Joe Bullard	Houston Oilers	DB
1972	11	16	276	Bob Waldron	Detroit Lions	DT
1972	14	7	345	Steve Barrios	New Orleans Saints	WR
1972	15	9	372	Rusty Lachaussee	New Orleans Saints	QB
1973	10	2	236	Randy Lee	Minnesota Vikings	DB
1973	12	26	312	Mike Mullen	Miami Dolphins	LB
1974	10	8	242	Tommy Thibodeaux	New Orleans Saints	G
1974	13	8	320	Mike Truax	New Orleans Saints	LB
1975	4	21	99	Charlie Hall	New Orleans Saints	DE
1975	8	18	199	Steve Foley	Denver Broncos	DB
1975	8	23	204	John Washington	Los Angeles Rams	DB
1976	9	8	245	Jim Gueno	Green Bay Packers	LB
1976	12	6	325	Nathaniel Bell	New England Patriots	DT
1976	17	7	466	Darwin Willie	New York Jets	TE
1977	6	19	158	Martin Mitchell	Philadelphia Eagles	DB
1978	4	22	106	Eric Laakso	Miami Dolphins	T
1979	10	11	259	Ricky Smith	Oakland Raiders	DB
1979	12	12	315	Dewitt Methvin	Cleveland Browns	C
1980	7	1	166	Eddie Murray	Detroit Lions	K
1980	11	4	281	Alton Alexis	Cincinnati Bengals	WR
1981	10	3	251	Marty Wetzel	New York Jets	LB
1981	10	7	255	Nickie Hall	Green Bay Packers	QB
1982	3	27	82	Rodney Holman	Cincinnati Bengals	TE
1982	6	3	142	Marvin Lewis	New Orleans Saints	RB
1982	7	1	168	Jeff Roberts	New England Patriots	LB
1983	4	19	103	Lionel Washington	St. Louis Cardinals	DB
1984u	2	1	29	Don Maggs	Houston Oilers	T
1984u	9	26	250	Jim Boyle	Miami Dolphins	T
1984	11	23	303	Elton Veals	Pittsburgh Steelers	RB
1985	11	27	307	Mike Jones	Miami Dolphins	RB
1985	12	12	320	Treg Songy	New Orleans Saints	DB
1986	6	5	143	Burnell Dent	Green Bay Packers	LB
1987	2	21	49	Eric Thomas	Cincinnati Bengals	DB
1988	7	17	182	Marc Zeno	Pittsburgh Steelers	WR
1988	11	17	294	Marvin Allen	New England Patriots	RB
1989	7	28	195	Terrence Jones	San Diego Chargers	QB
1989	11	26	305	Richard Harvey	Buffalo Bills	LB
1990	9	14	234	Mitchell Price	Cincinnati Bengals	DB
1991	6	21	160	Mike Riley	New York Jets	DB
1994	6	14	175	Ruffin Hamilton	Green Bay Packers	LB
1997	7	30	231	Jerald Sowell	Green Bay Packers	FB
1999	2	19	50	Shaun King	Tampa Bay Buccaneers	QB
2000	3	17	79	JaJuan Dawson	Cleveland Browns	WR
2001	5	7	138	Bernard Robertson	Chicago Bears	T
2002	1	32	32	Patrick Ramsey	Washington Redskins	QB
2004	1	22	22	J. P. Losman	Buffalo Bills	QB
2004	4	23	119	Mewelde Moore	Minnesota Vikings	RB
2005	4	35	136	Roydell Williams	Tennessee Titans	WR
2006	7	39	247	Anthony Cannon	Detroit Lions	LB
2008	2	13	44	Matt Forté	Chicago Bears	RB
2009	4	35	135	Troy Kropog	Tennessee Titans	T
2014	5	2	145	Ryan Grant	Washington Redskins	WR
2015	5	28	164	Lorenzo Doss	Denver Broncos	DB
2015	7	34	251	Taurean Nixon	Denver Broncos	DB
2017	6	5	189	Tanzel Smart	Los Angeles Rams	DT
2018	6	5	179	Parry Nickerson	New York Jets	DB
2018	6	43	218	Ade Aruna	Minnesota Vikings	DE
2019	7	7	221	Donnie Lewis	Cleveland Browns	DB
2020	5	27	173	Darnell Mooney	Chicago Bears	WR
2020	7	23	237	BoPete Keyes	Kansas City Chiefs	DB
2021	4	6	111	Cameron Sample	Cincinnati Bengals	DE
2021	7	6	234	Patrick Johnson	Philadelphia Eagles	DE
2023	3	18	81	Tyjae Spears	Tennessee Titans	RB
2023	3	28	91	Dorian Williams	Buffalo Bills	LB
2024	6	6	182	Jha'Quan Jackson	Tennessee Titans	WR
2024	7	25	245	Michael Pratt	Green Bay Packers	QB
2025	3	24	88	Caleb Ransaw	Jacksonville Jaguars	DB
2025	7	21	237	Micah Robinson	Green Bay Packers	DB

== Notable undrafted players ==
Note: No drafts held before 1920

Year	Player	Position	Debut Team	Notes
1957	Ed Khayat	DT	Washington Redskins	—
1971	Ray Hester	LB	New Orleans Saints	—
1975	Rusty Chambers	LB	New Orleans Saints	—
1979	Mark Olivari	LB	Pittsburgh Steelers	—
1981	Marcus Anderson	WR	Los Angeles Rams	—
1981	Chuck Pitcock	C	Philadelphia Eagles	—
1981	Joe Silipo	T	Kansas City Chiefs	—
1982	Nolan Franz	WR	Buffalo Bills	—
1982	Sylvester McGrew	DT	New York Giants	—
1983	Jerry Baker	DT	Denver Broncos	—
1986	James Campen	C	New Orleans Saints	—
1986	Joe Caravello	TE	Atlanta Falcons	—
1986	Ken Karcher	QB	Denver Broncos	—
1986	Ron Tilton	G	Washington Redskins	—
1987	Curt Baham	LB	Seattle Seahawks	—
1987	Jeff Wenzel	T	Philadelphia Eagles	—
1991	Lonnie Marts	LB	Kansas City Chiefs	—
1991	Darin Shoulders	T	Indianapolis Colts	—
1994	Michael Batiste	G	Dallas Cowboys	—
1996	Corey Dowden	DB	Green Bay Packers	—
1999	P. J. Franklin	WR	New Orleans Saints	—
1999	Cory Geason	TE	Pittsburgh Steelers	—
1999	Dennis O'Sullivan	LS	New York Jets	—
1999	Brad Palazzo	K	Green Bay Packers	—
2001	Tim Carter	DB	New Orleans Saints	—
2003	Seth Marler	K	Jacksonville Jaguars	—
2003	Jeff Sanchez	DB	Dallas Cowboys	—
2007	Lester Ricard	QB	Jacksonville Jaguars	—
2010	Andre' Anderson	RB	Buffalo Bills	—
2012	Dezman Moses	LB	Green Bay Packers	—
2013	Ryan Griffin	QB	New Orleans Saints	—
2014	Orleans Darkwa	RB	Miami Dolphins	—
2014	Cairo Santos	K	Kansas City Chiefs	—
2016	Robert Kelley	RB	Washington Redskins	—
2018	Dontrell Hilliard	RB	Cleveland Browns	—
2019	John Leglue	T	Denver Broncos	—
2022	Ryan Wright	P	Minnesota Vikings	—
2023	Duece Watts	WR	Green Bay Packers	—
2024	Sincere Haynesworth	C	New Orleans Saints	—
2024	Darius Hodges	DE	Carolina Panthers	—
2024	Lawrence Keys	WR	Buffalo Bills	—
2024	Jarius Monroe	CB	New York Jets	—
2024	Lance Robinson	CB	Cincinnati Bengals	—
2025	Reggie Brown	TE	Chicago Bears	—
2025	Johnathan Edwards	DB	Indianapolis Colts	—
2025	Dontae Fleming	WR	Minnesota Vikings	—
2025	Adin Huntington	DT	Cleveland Browns	—
2025	Patrick Jenkins	DT	Arizona Cardinals	—
2025	Vincent Murphy	OL	Chicago Bears	—
2025	Mario Williams	WR	Los Angeles Rams	—
