= 1985 All-South Independent football team =

American college football season

The 1985 All-South Independent football team consists of American football players chosen by the Associated Press for their All-South independent teams for the 1985 NCAA Division I-A football season.

== Offense ==
=== Quarterbacks ===
- Vinny Testaverde, Miami (AP-1)
- Danny Sparkman, Memphis (AP-2)

=== Running backs ===
- Vincent Alexander, Southern Miss (AP-1)
- Tony Baker, East Carolina (AP-1)
- Victor Floyd, Florida State (AP-2)
- Maurice Williams, Virginia Tech (AP-2)

=== Wide receivers ===
- Hassan Jones, Florida State (AP-1)
- Ernest Givens, Louisville (AP-1)
- Michael Irvin, Miami (AP-2)
- Marc Zeno, Tulane (AP-2)

=== Tight ends ===
- Willie Smith, Miami (AP-1)
- Danny Thomas, Louisville (AP-2)

=== Offensive tackles ===
- John Ionata, Florida State (AP-1)
- Jeff Walker, Memphis (AP-1)
- Paul Berlucelli, Miami (AP-2)
- Pat Tomberlin, Florida State (AP-2)

=== Offensive guards ===
- Jamie Dukes, Florida State (AP-1)
- Tom Mehr, Virginia Tech (AP-1)
- Kent Thomas, Virginia Tech (AP-2)
- Dave Alekna, Miami (AP-2)

=== Centers ===
- Gregg Rakoczy, Miami (AP-1)
- Mark Johnson, Virginia Tech (AP-2)

== Defense ==
=== Defensive ends ===
- John McVeigh, Miami (AP-1)
- Morgan Roane, Virginia Tech (AP-1)
- Tony Guyton, South Carolina (AP-2)
- Steve Spinella, Louisiana-Lafayette (AP-2)

=== Defensive tackles ===
- Jerome Brown, Miami (AP-1)
- Isaac Williams, Florida State (AP-1)
- Kip Smith, Southern Miss (AP-2)
- Gerald Nichols, Florida State (AP-2)
- Tracy Oakley, Southern Miss (AP-2)

=== Linebackers ===
- Paul McGowan, Florida State (AP-1)
- George Mira Jr., Miami (AP-1)
- Burnell Dent, Tulane (AP-1)
- Eric Fairs, Memphis (AP-1)
- Matt Battaglia, Louisville (AP-2)
- Paul Nelson, Virginia Tech (AP-2)
- Onesimus Henry, Southern Miss (AP-2)

=== Defensive backs ===
- Greg Philpot, South Carolina (AP-1)
- Kevin Walker, East Carolina (AP-1)
- Selwyn Brown, Miami (AP-1)
- Carter Wiley, Virginia Tech (AP-2)
- Martin Mayhew, Florida State (AP-2)
- Tim Smith, Southern Miss (AP-2)

== Special teams ==
=== Kickers ===
- Derek Schmidt, Florida State (AP-1)
- Wayne Clements, Tulane (AP-2)

=== Punters ===
- Louis Berry, Florida State (AP-1)
- Tom O'Connor, South Carolina (AP-2)
