= 1970 All-South Independent football team =

American college football season

The 1970 All-South Independent football team consists of American football players chosen by the Associated Press for their All-South independent teams for the 1970 NCAA University Division football season.

== Offense ==
Quarterback

- Tommy Warren, Florida State
  - Honorable Mention: Rick Donegan, Southern Mississippi

Running backs

- Dave Abercrombie, Tulane
- Brent Cunningham, Georgia Tech
  - Honorable Mentions: Larry Moulton, Southern Mississippi; Tom Sullivan, Miami

Wide receivers

- Steve Barrios, Tulane
- Rhett Dawson, Florida State
  - Honorable Mention: Larry Studdard, Georgia Tech

Tight end

- Joe Schmidt, Miami

Tackles

- Rick Lantz, Georgia Tech
- Richard Gardner, Georgia Tech
  - Honorable Mentions: Chipp Dewitt, Tulane; Mike Paul, Tulane

Guards

- Allen Wilkenfeld, Tulane

Center

- Allen Dees, Florida State

== Defense ==
Defensive linemen

- Rock Perdoni, Georgia Tech
- Robert McEachern, Florida State
- Mike Walker, Tulane
- Hugh Eggersman, Southern Mississippi
  - Honorable Mentions: Mike Barnes, Miami; Jack Chauvet, Miami

Linebackers

- Dickey Surace, Southern Mississippi
- Rick Kingrea, Tulane
- Bill Flowers, Georgia Tech
  - Honorable Mentions: Ball Davis, Southern Mississippi; Ray Hester, Tulane; Bo Dunn, Miami; Bill Lohse, Florida State

Defensive backs

- James Thomas, Florida State
- Joe Bullard, Tulane
- Jeff Ford, Georgia Tech
- Paul Ellis, Tulane
  - Honorable Mentions: Rick Lewis, Georgia Tech; Eddie McMillan, Florida State

== Special teams ==
Kicker

- Ray Guy, Southern Mississippi
  - Honorable Mention: Frank Fontes, Florida State

Punter

- Ray Guy, Southern Mississippi
