= Selwyn Brown =

Selwyn Brown may refer to:

- Selwyn Brown (musician), keyboard player with Steel Pulse
- Selwyn Brown (American football) (born 1965), American football defensive back
