= Patrick Durcan =

Patrick Durcan may refer to:

- Patrick Durcan (politician) (born 1951), Irish judge and politician
- Patrick Durcan (bishop) (1790–1875), Irish Roman Catholic clergyman

== See also ==
- Paddy Durcan (born 1994), Gaelic footballer
- Patrick Durkin (1956–2020), American businessman and public official
