= Ryan Griffin =

Ryan Griffin may refer to:

- Ryan Griffin (tight end) (born 1990), American football tight end for the Chicago Bears
- Ryan Griffin (quarterback) (born 1989), American football quarterback for the Tampa Bay Buccaneers

== See also ==
- Ryan Griffen, Australian footballer
