= JaJuan Dawson =

American football player (1977–2015)

No. 88, 87
- Position: Wide receiver

Personal information
- Born: November 5, 1977; Houston, Texas, U.S.
- Died: July 12, 2015 (aged 37); Lavon Lake, Texas, U.S.
- Listed height: 6 ft 1 in (1.85 m)
- Listed weight: 197 lb (89 kg)

Career information
- High school: Gray (LA) H. L. Bourgeois
- College: Tulane
- NFL draft: 2000: 3rd round, 79th overall pick

Career history
- Cleveland Browns (2000–2001); Houston Texans (2002); Indianapolis Colts (2003); New York Giants (2004)*
- * Offseason or practice squad member only

Career NFL statistics
- Receptions: 52
- Receiving yards: 664
- Touchdowns: 2
- Stats at Pro Football Reference

JaJuan LaTroy Dawson (November 5, 1977 – July 12, 2015) was an American professional football player who was a wide receiver in the National Football League (NFL) from 2000 to 2002. He played for the Cleveland Browns and Houston Texans. He was selected by the Browns in the third round of the 2000 NFL draft with the 79th overall pick.

He was a 1995 graduate of H.L. Bourgeois High School in Gray, Louisiana. He played collegiately at Tulane University, alongside future NFL quarterbacks Shaun King and Patrick Ramsey. He also played in an offensive system under then OC Rich Rodriguez in 1997 and 1998.

Dawson was reported to have fallen overboard while on a boating trip with family on July 12, 2015. Reports surfaced that he drowned in Lavon Lake, Texas, and his body was recovered on July 14. Dawson was not wearing a lifejacket.

== College statistics ==
- 1996: 18 catches for 211 yards and 1 touchdown.
- 1997: 52 catches for 839 yards and 10 touchdowns.
- 1998: 74 catches for 1030 yards and 12 touchdowns.
- 1999: 96 catches for 1051 yards and 8 touchdowns. 1 carry for 3 yards. 14 kick returns for 328 yards.

In 2001, he had 22 catches for 281 yards and 1 touchdown while playing for the Cleveland Browns. He joined the Houston Texans in 2002 and had 21 catches for 286 yards.

== NFL career statistics ==
Legend
**Bold**	Career high

Year	Team	Games		Receiving					
Year	Team	GP	GS	Tgt	Rec	Yds	Avg	Lng	TD
2000	CLE	2	**2**	14	9	97	10.8	26	**1**
2001	CLE	**14**	0	34	**22**	281	12.8	**44**	**1**
2002	HOU	**14**	**2**	**39**	21	**286**	**13.6**	28	0
		30	4	87	52	664	12.8	44	2
