= Martez Wilson =

American gridiron football player (born 1988)

No. 95, 56, 52
- Position: Linebacker

Personal information
- Born: September 21, 1988 (age 38); Chicago, Illinois, U.S.
- Listed height: 6 ft 4 in (1.93 m)
- Listed weight: 252 lb (114 kg)

Career information
- High school: Simeon (Chicago)
- College: Illinois
- NFL draft: 2011: 3rd round, 72nd overall pick

Career history
- New Orleans Saints (2011–2013); Oakland Raiders (2013); Dallas Cowboys (2013); Toronto Argonauts (2015)

Awards and highlights
- First-team All-Big Ten (2010)

Career NFL statistics
- Games played: 38
- Total tackles: 33
- Sacks: 5.0
- Forced fumbles: 1
- Fumble recoveries: 1
- Stats at Pro Football Reference

Martez Jerome Wilson (born September 21, 1988) is an American former professional football player who was a linebacker in the National Football League (NFL) for the New Orleans Saints, Oakland Raiders and Dallas Cowboys. He also was a member of the Toronto Argonauts in the Canadian Football League (CFL). He played college football at the University of Illinois.

== Early life ==
Wilson attended Simeon Career Academy in Chicago, Illinois, where he was classmates with NBA MVP, Derrick Rose. Wilson played on the football team as a defensive end. As a junior, he collected 99 tackles (20 for loss), 18 sacks, 7 forced fumbles and one interception, while receiving All-metro honors.

As a senior, he recorded 240 tackles, 7 sacks, one interception, one forced fumble, one fumble recovery, 42 receptions for 1,005 yards and 9 touchdowns. He was an All-Public League, All-Area, All-State, All-American by USA Today, Parade, SuperPrep, PrepStar and also played in the 2007 U.S. Army All-American Bowl. Regarded as a five-star recruit by Rivals.com, Wilson was listed as the No. 2 weakside defensive end in the class of 2007.

He also competed in the 100 and 200 metres.

College recruiting
Name	Hometown	School	Height	Weight	40^{‡}	Commit date
Martez Wilson; DE	Chicago, IL	Simeon	6 ft 4 in (1.93 m)	228 lb (103 kg)	4.5	Dec 21, 2006
Martez Wilson; DE	Recruit ratings: Scout: Rivals: (87)					
Overall recruit ranking: Scout: 28 Rivals: 26 ESPN: 5
Note: In many cases, Scout, Rivals, 247Sports, On3, and ESPN may conflict in their listings of height and weight.; In these cases, the average was taken. ESPN grades are on a 100-point scale.; Sources: "Illinois Football Commitment List". Rivals.; "2007 Illinois Football Commits". Scout.; "2007 PLAYER COMMITS". ESPN.; "Scout.com Team Recruiting Rankings". Scout.; "2007 Team Ranking". Rivals.com.

== College career ==
Wilson accepted a football scholarship from the University of Illinois. As a freshman, he appeared in 13 games as a backup at strongside linebacker, making 29 tackles (15 solo), 2 sacks, 3 tackles for loss and one pass defensed, while receiving Freshman All-American honorable-mention honors by Scout.com. He had 13 tackles (8 solo) against the University of Minnesota.

As a sophomore, he played in 7 of 11 games at strongside linebacker, recording 73 tackles (third on the team), 3 sacks, 5.5 tackles for loss, 3 passes defensed, one forced fumble, 2 fumble recoveries and one blocked punt.

In the season opener of his junior year in 2009, although he had 9 tackles (2 solo), he suffered a herniated disc in his neck, which forced him to miss the remainder of the season.

He was granted a medical hardship waiver and retained a year of eligibility. By 2010, he evolved into one of the best linebackers in the Big Ten Conference, ranking second in the conference in tackles (9.1 tackles per game) midway through the season.

As a senior, he was switched to middle linebacker and started 13 games. He collected 112 tackles (led the team), 11.5 tackles for losses, 4 sacks, one interception, 4 passes defensed, 3 forced fumbles, one fumble recovery and one blocked punt. He finished his college career with 21 starts in 38 games, 223 tackles (102 solo), 20 tackles for loss, 9 sacks, one interception, 8 passes defensed, 4 forced fumbles and 3 fumble recoveries.

== Professional career ==
=== Pre-draft ===
Wilson announced his decision to forgo his senior season, and enter the 2011 NFL draft, on January 10, 2011.

Pre-draft measurables
Height	Weight	Arm length	Hand span	Wingspan	40-yard dash	10-yard split	20-yard split	20-yard shuttle	Three-cone drill	Vertical jump	Broad jump	Bench press
6 ft 3 3/4 in (1.92 m)	250 lb (113 kg)	34 5/8 in (0.88 m)	9 3/4 in (0.25 m)	6 ft 11 7/8 in (2.13 m)	4.46 s	1.59 s	2.63 s	4.28 s	7.04 s	36.0 in (0.91 m)	10 ft 4 in (3.15 m)	23 reps
All values from NFL Combine

=== New Orleans Saints ===
Wilson was selected by the New Orleans Saints in the 3rd round (72nd overall) of the 2011 NFL draft. The pick used to select him was traded from the Washington Redskins in exchange for Jammal Brown. As a rookie, he appeared in 13 games with one start at strongside linebacker, making 5 tackles, one sack and one forced fumble. His best game came in the NFC Divisional Playoffs 36-32 loss against the San Francisco 49ers, when he had 1.5 sacks. He was declared inactive in 2 games with a shoulder injury.

In 2012, he appeared in 16 games as a backup defensive end, registering 18 tackles (12 solo), 3 sacks, 2 passes defensed, one forced fumble, one fumble recovery, 13 special teams tackles (tied for second on the team) and one blocked punt.

In 2013, the team switched to a 3-4 defense, but it didn't improve his playing time and was also injured to start the season. He was active in only 4 games as a backup and was declared inactive in Week 6. He was released to make room for quarterback Ryan Griffin on October 22. He had 3 tackles, one sack and one special teams tackle.

=== Oakland Raiders ===
On October 23, 2013, he was claimed off waivers by the Oakland Raiders. He appeared in 3 games and did not record a tackle. On November 19, he was released by the Oakland Raiders to make room to activate linebacker Miles Burris from reserve/physically unable to perform list.

=== Dallas Cowboys ===
On November 26, 2013, he signed as a free agent with the Dallas Cowboys, to replace Everett Dawkins and provide depth because of injuries. He appeared in 2 games, had one quarterback pressure and was declared inactive in the last 3 games of the season.

In 2014, he was switched from linebacker to defensive end during training camp. He was released on August 24.

=== Toronto Argonauts ===
On May 13, 2015, he was signed as a free agent by the Toronto Argonauts of the Canadian Football League, to play as a defensive end. He suffered a neck injury in his debut and was lost for the year. He was not re-signed after the season.
