= Tom O'Connor (American football) =

American football player (born 1963)

No. 14
- Position: Punter

Personal information
- Born: November 8, 1963 (age 62); Patchogue, New York, U.S.
- Listed height: 6 ft 1 in (1.85 m)
- Listed weight: 190 lb (86 kg)

Career information
- High school: Patchogue-Medford
- College: South Carolina
- NFL draft: 1986: undrafted

Career history
- Miami Dolphins (1986)*; New York Jets (1987)
- * Offseason or practice squad member only

Career NFL statistics
- Punts: 18
- Punt yards: 602
- Average: 33.4
- Stats at Pro Football Reference

Thomas L. O'Connor (born November 8, 1963) is an American former professional football player who was a punter for three games with the New York Jets of the National Football League (NFL). 1985 second team all south Independent
