= Bernie Darre =

American football player (1939–2006)

No. 66, 67
- Position: Guard

Personal information
- Born: November 8, 1939; New Orleans, Louisiana, U.S.
- Died: April 26, 2006 (aged 66); Cincinnati, Ohio, U.S.
- Listed height: 6 ft 2 in (1.88 m)
- Listed weight: 230 lb (104 kg)

Career information
- High school: Alcee Fortier (LA)
- College: Tulane
- NFL draft: 1960: 15th round, 172nd overall pick
- AFL draft: 1960

Career history
- Washington Redskins (1961)

Career NFL statistics
- Games played: 12
- Stats at Pro Football Reference

Bernard John Darre (November 8, 1939 – April 26, 2006) was an American professional football guard in the National Football League (NFL) for the Washington Redskins. He played college football at Tulane University and was selected 172nd overall in the 15th round of the 1960 NFL draft.

Darre quit football in 1962 to attend graduate school. He earned a Ph.D. in chemistry at Ohio State University in 1966, and was an industrial chemist in Baton Rouge, Louisiana and Cincinnati, Ohio. He became president of the Shepherd Chemical Company in 1985. He was inducted into Tulane's Athletic Hall of Fame in 1990.

Darre married Beatrice Fry in 1966, and they had three children. Their son John died in 1992. Darre died in 2006, at the age of 66, in Cincinnati.
