= Patrick Ramsey =

American football player (born 1979)

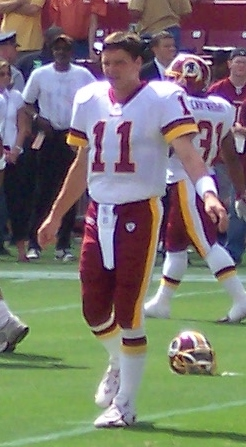
- Ramsey with the Washington Redskins in 2005

No. 11, 14, 7, 8, 9
- Position: Quarterback

Personal information
- Born: February 14, 1979 (age 47); Ruston, Louisiana, U.S.
- Listed height: 6 ft 2 in (1.88 m)
- Listed weight: 225 lb (102 kg)

Career information
- High school: Ruston
- College: Tulane (1997–2001)
- NFL draft: 2002: 1st round, 32nd overall pick

Career history
- Washington Redskins (2002–2005); New York Jets (2006); Denver Broncos (2007–2008); Tennessee Titans (2009); Detroit Lions (2009); New Orleans Saints (2010)*; Jacksonville Jaguars (2010); Miami Dolphins (2010); Minnesota Vikings (2010)
- * Offseason or practice squad member only

Career NFL statistics
- Passing attempts: 913
- Passing completions: 511
- Completion percentage: 56.0%
- TD–INT: 35–30
- Passing yards: 5,930
- Passer rating: 74.9
- Stats at Pro Football Reference

Patrick Allen Ramsey (born February 14, 1979) is an American former professional football player who was a quarterback in the National Football League (NFL). He played college football for the Tulane Green Wave and was selected by the Washington Redskins in the first round of the 2002 NFL draft. Ramsey was also a member of the New York Jets, Denver Broncos, Tennessee Titans, Detroit Lions, New Orleans Saints, Jacksonville Jaguars, Miami Dolphins, and Minnesota Vikings.

== Early life ==
Ramsey was born on February 14, 1979, in Ruston, Louisiana. He attended Ruston High School, where he was a two-year starter quarterback, and was also state champion in the javelin throw. His best friend was the son of Bert Jones, a Ruston native who had gone on to a distinguished career as an NFL quarterback, and the elder Jones became Ramsey's mentor.

== College career ==
Ramsey attended Tulane University and had an outstanding collegiate career as a "scholar athlete", being named five times to the Conference USA Commissioner's honor roll, and was the National Football Foundation/College Football Hall of Fame Scholar-Athlete of the Year, in 2001.

During Ramsey's 1999 season, he set 20 Tulane passing records, including single season records for passing yards, attempts, and completions. In that season he threw for 25 touchdowns, the second-most ever for a Tulane player. In 2000, he led the third-best passing offense in the nation. He also made the All-Conference USA second-team, leading the conference in most meaningful passing statistics. In his senior season in 2001 he started 11 games and threw for 22 touchdowns. He set a school record, having at least one touchdown pass in 31 consecutive games. Upon graduating, he had the top five passing games in school history. His career totals at Tulane were surpassed only (in various individual statistics, none overall) by Shaun King, Mike McKay, Roch Hontas, and Terrence Jones.

Ramsey graduated with degrees in accounting and finance.

== Professional career ==
Pre-draft measurables
Height	Weight	Arm length	Hand span	20-yard shuttle	Three-cone drill	Vertical jump	Broad jump	Wonderlic
6 ft 2 1/2 in (1.89 m)	219 lb (99 kg)	31 1/8 in (0.79 m)	10 in (0.25 m)	4.09 s	7.12 s	33.5 in (0.85 m)	9 ft 4 in (2.84 m)	32
All values from NFL Combine

=== Washington Redskins ===
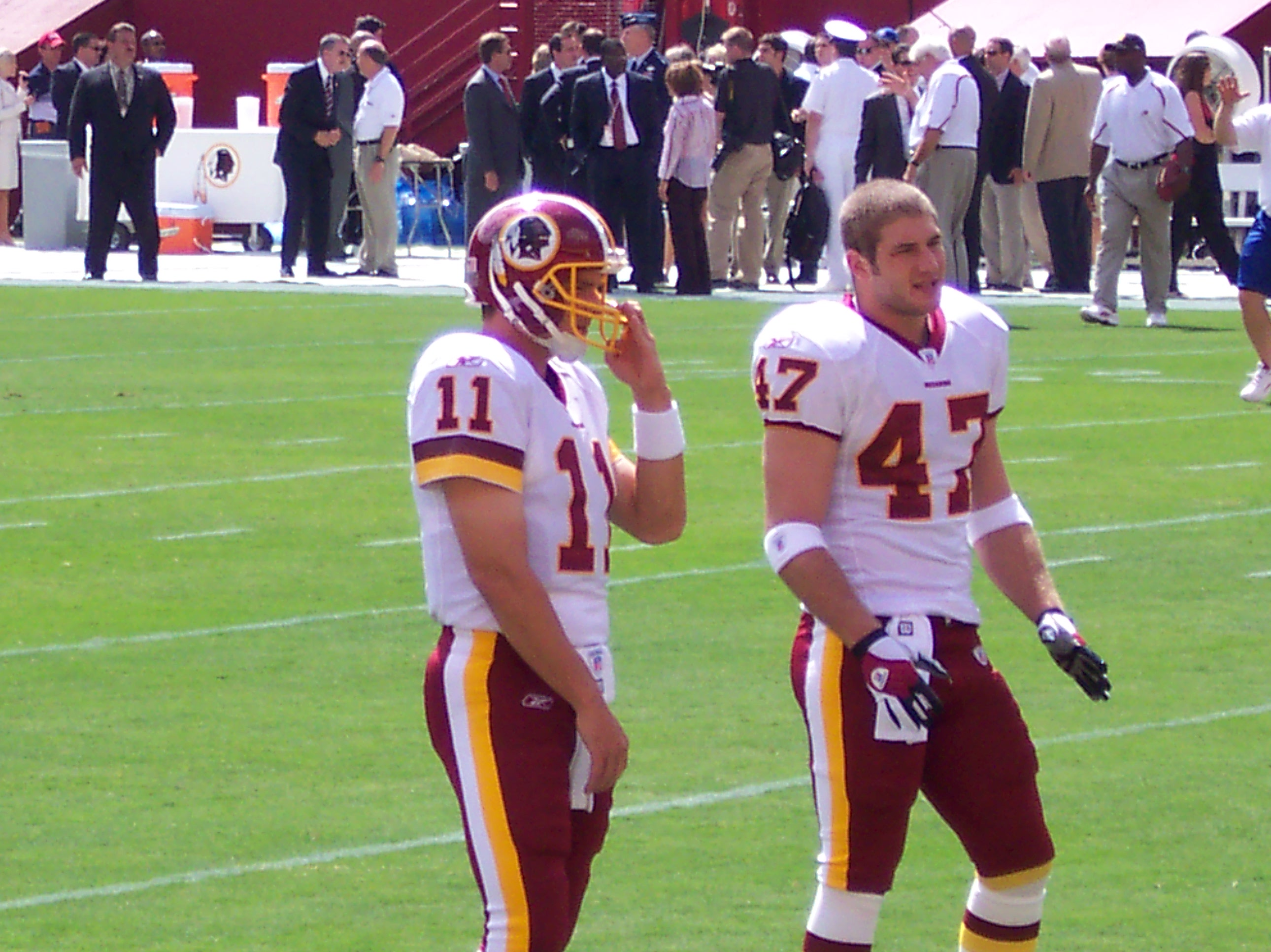
Ramsey and Chris Cooley in 2005 with the Washington Redskins.

Ramsey was selected in the first round with the 32nd overall pick in the 2002 NFL draft by the Washington Redskins, to replace Tony Banks as quarterback.

On October 13, 2002, the Redskins hosted the team from Ramsey's home state, the New Orleans Saints. Ramsey threw four interceptions as the Saints won 43–27.

The 2003 season, Ramsey's first full season as a starter was even more difficult. He was one of the most sacked quarterbacks in the NFL that year, which was also Spurrier's last season as head coach. In 2004, Joe Gibbs returned to coach the team after a prolonged absence; he originally traded for Mark Brunell as the starting quarterback (and then quickly signed him to a long term extension) but replaced him with Ramsey in November. A month later, Gibbs named Ramsey as the starting quarterback for the 2005 season.

In the Redskins' first game against the Chicago Bears, Ramsey suffered a minor neck injury after a clothesline hit by Chicago Bears linebacker Lance Briggs. Gibbs demoted Ramsey to the role of Brunell's back-up for the second game versus the Dallas Cowboys. It was reported that Ramsey requested a trade from the Redskins, following announcement of his demotion. This report was later claimed to be false by Ramsey and the Redskins organization.

=== New York Jets ===
In March 2006, Ramsey was traded to the New York Jets for a 6th round pick in the 2006 NFL draft. After failing to earn the starting quarterback position from incumbent Chad Pennington, he was cut after the 2006 season. He only threw a single pass for the Jets.

=== Denver Broncos ===
Following the season, Ramsey signed with the Denver Broncos, serving as the backup to starter Jay Cutler. He was released in the beginning of free agency in March 2009.

=== Tennessee Titans ===
Ramsey signed a one-year contract with the Tennessee Titans on April 3, 2009, serving as the third quarterback on the depth chart after Kerry Collins and Vince Young. He was released on October 3 when cornerback Cary Williams was activated from the practice squad.

=== Detroit Lions ===
Ramsey was signed by the Detroit Lions on December 26, 2009, after quarterback Matthew Stafford was placed on injured reserve.

=== New Orleans Saints ===
Ramsey signed a one-year contract with the New Orleans Saints on July 28, 2010; he was projected to serve as a veteran backup for the Saints' starting quarterback, Drew Brees, filling the role vacated by Mark Brunell who was not re-signed after the 2009 season. On September 3, Ramsey was released as part of final cuts before the start of the 2010 NFL season, with Chase Daniel having won the backup spot.

=== Jacksonville Jaguars ===
Due to the Jacksonville Jaguars' quarterback injury problems in early 2010, Ramsey was brought on as a potential temporary backup for the team. He was released from the team shortly after on October 29, 2010.

=== Miami Dolphins ===
On November 15, 2010, it was reported that he was signed by the Miami Dolphins following injuries to Chad Pennington and Chad Henne. He was released on waivers November 30, 2010.

=== Minnesota Vikings ===
On December 15, 2010, Ramsey signed a contract with the Minnesota Vikings but did not play any games that year and was not on the Vikings' 2011 roster.

== Personal life ==
Ramsey married his wife, Virginia, on April 13, 2002, the week before the 2002 NFL draft. The couple has two daughters, Virginia and Jane. He and his wife had their third child in the fall of 2011, Grey.
