= Patrick Johnson (defensive end) =

American football player (born 1998)

No. 93 – Las Vegas Raiders
- Position: Defensive end
- Roster status: Injured reserve

Personal information
- Born: January 10, 1998 (age 28); Chattanooga, Tennessee, U.S.
- Listed height: 6 ft 2 in (1.88 m)
- Listed weight: 248 lb (112 kg)

Career information
- High school: Notre Dame (Chattanooga)
- College: Tulane (2017–2020)
- NFL draft: 2021: 7th round, 234th overall pick

Career history
- Philadelphia Eagles (2021–2024); New York Giants (2024); Philadelphia Eagles (2025)*; New England Patriots (2025)*; Las Vegas Raiders (2026–present)
- * Offseason or practice squad member only

Awards and highlights
- Second-team All-American (2020); First-team All-AAC (2020); 2× Second-team All-AAC (2018, 2019)

Career NFL statistics as of 2025
- Total tackles: 39
- Forced fumbles: 1
- Fumble recoveries: 1
- Stats at Pro Football Reference

Patrick Johnson (born January 10, 1998) is an American professional football defensive end for the Las Vegas Raiders of the National Football League (NFL). He played college football for the Tulane Green Wave. He has previously played for the Philadelphia Eagles and New York Giants.

== Early life ==
Johnson grew up in Chattanooga, Tennessee and attended Notre Dame High School.

== College career ==
Johnson played for the Tulane Green Wave for four seasons. After serving as a reserve outside linebacker as a freshman, he became a starting edge rusher going into his sophomore year and was named second-team All-American Athletic Conference (AAC) after leading the team with 10.5 sacks, 16 tackles for loss and four forced fumbles. Johnson was named second-team All-AAC for a second straight season after recording four sacks and 8.5 tackles for loss with four passes broken up as a junior. Johnson was named first-team All-AAC after finishing his senior season with 39 tackles, 14.5 tackles for loss, 10 sacks with two forced fumbles. He was also named a second-team All-American by the Walter Camp Football Foundation, The Sporting News, and the Football Writers Association of America. Johnson finished his collegiate career as Tulane's career leader in sacks with 24.5.

== Professional career ==
Pre-draft measurables
Height	Weight	Arm length	Hand span	Wingspan	40-yard dash	10-yard split	20-yard split	20-yard shuttle	Three-cone drill	Vertical jump	Broad jump	Bench press
6 ft 2 in (1.88 m)	240 lb (109 kg)	32 in (0.81 m)	10 in (0.25 m)	6 ft 5 3/4 in (1.97 m)	4.66 s	1.62 s	2.71 s	4.45 s	6.96 s	35.0 in (0.89 m)	9 ft 11 in (3.02 m)	16 reps
All values from Pro Day

=== Philadelphia Eagles (first stint) ===
Johnson was selected in the seventh round with the 234th overall pick of the 2021 NFL draft by the Philadelphia Eagles.

On September 16, 2024, Johnson was waived by the Eagles.

=== New York Giants ===
On September 17, 2024, Johnson was claimed off waivers by the New York Giants.

=== Philadelphia Eagles (second stint) ===
On March 14, 2025, Johnson signed a one-year contract with the Philadelphia Eagles. He was released on August 26 as part of final roster cuts and re-signed to the practice squad the next day. Johnson was elevated from the practice squad ahead of the Eagles' season opener against the Dallas Cowboys, then signed to the active roster on September 8. He was released on November 4. Johnson re-signed with the Eagles' practice squad the following day.

=== New England Patriots ===
On January 28, 2026, Johnson was signed to the New England Patriots' practice squad.

=== Las Vegas Raiders ===
On July 27, 2026, Johnson signed with the Las Vegas Raiders.
