= Lester Ricard =

American football player (born 1983)

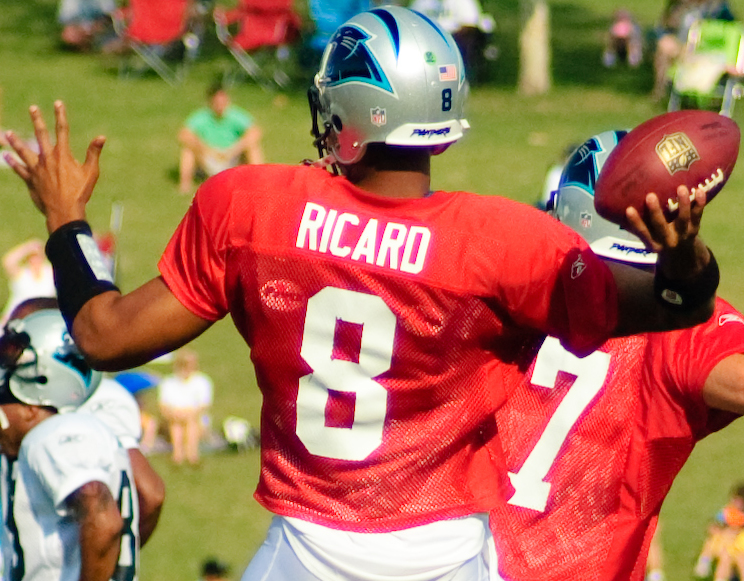
- Ricard with the Carolina Panthers in 2008

No. 8, 12
- Position: Quarterback

Personal information
- Born: December 11, 1983 (age 42); Denham Springs, Louisiana, U.S.
- Listed height: 6 ft 4 in (1.93 m)
- Listed weight: 228 lb (103 kg)

Career information
- College: Tulane
- NFL draft: 2007: undrafted

Career history
- Jacksonville Jaguars (2007)*; Carolina Panthers (2008)*; Edmonton Eskimos (2009)*; New Orleans VooDoo (2011)*; New Orleans Jazz (2011); Team Louisiana (2012)
- * Offseason or practice squad member only

Lester Ray Ricard Jr. (born December 11, 1983) is an American former football player. He played college football for the Tulane Green Wave. Ricard was signed by the Jacksonville Jaguars of the National Football League (NFL) as an undrafted free agent in 2007. He was also a member of the Carolina Panthers and Edmonton Eskimos.

== Early life ==
Lester Ricard attended Amite High School in Amite, Louisiana, and was a letterman in football, basketball, and track. In football, as a senior, he passed for 2,421 yards and 23 touchdowns, led his team to the semi-finals of the Class 3A playoffs, was named the District's Most Valuable Player, earned All-America honors from Parade Magazine, was a SuperPrep All-American, and named as a third-team All-South selection by BorderWars.

After his senior season, he was rated as the nation's No. 5 quarterback by Rivals.com, selected as a member of the Baton Rouge Advocate Super Dozen as well as the Dallas Morning News Super Southern 100. In basketball, he was a four-year varsity letterman. Ricard graduated from Amite High School in 2002 with a 3.0 GPA.

== College career ==
Ricard signed with LSU out of high school and redshirted in 2002. At the end of fall camp in August 2003, Ricard transferred to Tulane University. He played at Tulane through the 2006 season.

== Professional career ==
=== Jacksonville Jaguars ===
In the 2007 preseason game against the Miami Dolphins, Ricard completed 6 of 9 passes for 80 yards. Ricard was a member of the Jaguars' practice squad until he was waived on April 30, 2008.

=== Carolina Panthers ===
On May 19, 2008, Ricard was signed by the Carolina Panthers. He was later released by the Panthers to cut down the roster.

=== Edmonton Eskimos ===
Ricard was signed by the Edmonton Eskimos on May 13, 2009. He was a final cut on June 25, 2009.

=== Semi-pro football ===
After a poor performance for the New Orleans VooDoo in a March 2011 scrimmage, Ricard signed with the New Orleans Jazz of the Stars Football League in summer 2011. Ricard served as the Jazz's starting quarterback. The Jazz played only two games during the league's abortive 2011 season, with Ricard leading the team to two victories.

After the Jazz franchise was mothballed, Ricard signed with Team Louisiana of the Exclusive Football League. Much like its SFL predecessor, the EFL team in Louisiana was also quick to disband, breaking away from the league after one game (a 25–20 win over the EFL's Texas squad).

== Coaching career ==
In 2014, Ricard was on the football coaching staff at De La Salle High School (New Orleans) as quarterbacks coach. On March 20, 2014, Ricard was named head football coach at St. Martin's High School in Metairie, Louisiana. In 2016, he accepted a teacher position at Hahnville High School. In 2017, Ricard was named head coach at Walker High School in Walker, Louisiana and in September 2018, resigned from the position.
