= Nickie Hall =

American gridiron football player (born 1959)

No. 10, 12
- Position: Quarterback

Personal information
- Born: August 1, 1959; Lake Charles, Louisiana, U.S.
- Died: October 23, 2024 (aged 65)
- Listed height: 6 ft 4 in (1.93 m)
- Listed weight: 205 lb (93 kg)

Career information
- High school: Marion (Lake Charles)
- College: Tulane (1977–1980)
- NFL draft: 1981: 10th round, 255th overall pick

Career history
- 1981: Green Bay Packers
- 1982–1983: Winnipeg Blue Bombers
- 1983–1984: Saskatchewan Roughriders

Carl Nicholas Hall (August 1, 1959 – October 23, 2024), nicknamed Long Ball Hall, was an American football quarterback. He played college football for the Tulane Green Wave and was selected by the Green Bay Packers in the tenth round of the 1981 NFL draft. He played two seasons in the Canadian Football League (CFL) with the Winnipeg Blue Bombers and Saskatchewan Roughriders.

== Early life ==
Carl Nicholas Hall was born on August 1, 1959, in Lake Charles, Louisiana. He attended Marion High School in Lake Charles and graduated in 1977.

== College career ==
Hall was a four-year letterman for the Tulane Green Wave of Tulane University from 1977 to 1980. He completed 11 of 31 passes (35.5%) for 169 yards and two interceptions in 1978. He recorded nine completions on 17 passing attempts (52.9%) for 121 yards and three touchdowns during the 1979 season. After the departure of Roch Hontas, Hall became the team's starter in 1980. Hall completed 159 of 322 passes (49.4%) for 2,039 yards, 21 touchdowns, and 17 interceptions in 1980 while also rushing for 259 yards and seven touchdowns. His 28 total touchdowns in 1980 were the third most in the country behind Jim McMahon and John Elway. He was inducted in the Tulane Athletics Hall of Fame in 1999.

== Professional career ==
Hall was selected by the Green Bay Packers in the tenth round, with the 255th overall pick, of the 1981 NFL draft. On July 2, it was reported that he had officially signed with the team. He was placed on injured reserve with a shoulder injury on August 18, 1981, and missed the entire 1981 season. Hall was cut by the Packers the next year on August 9, 1982.

Hall then signed with the Winnipeg Blue Bombers of the Canadian Football League (CFL) in 1982 but did not dress in any games that year. He dressed in 12 games, starting four, for the Blue Bombers in 1983, completing 66 of 145 passes (45.5%) for 1,092 yards, four touchdowns, and four interceptions while also rushing 27 times for 193 yards.

In early October 1983, Hall, Nate Johnson, and Jason Riley were traded to the Saskatchewan Roughriders for John Hufnagel and J. C. Pelusi. Hall dressed in one game for the Roughriders during the 1983 season, totaling two completions on two attempts for 19 yards. He dressed in six games in 1984, completing 16 of 47 passes (34.0%) for 213 yards and two interceptions.

== Personal life ==
Hall later worked for the Coca Cola Bottling Co. and Kraft Foods before retiring in 2014. He also spent time volunteering for several non-profits in Louisiana. He died on October 23, 2024.

His brother, Charlie Hall, was inducted into the Tulane Athletics Hall of Fame in 1981.
