= Dezman Moses =

American football player (born 1989)

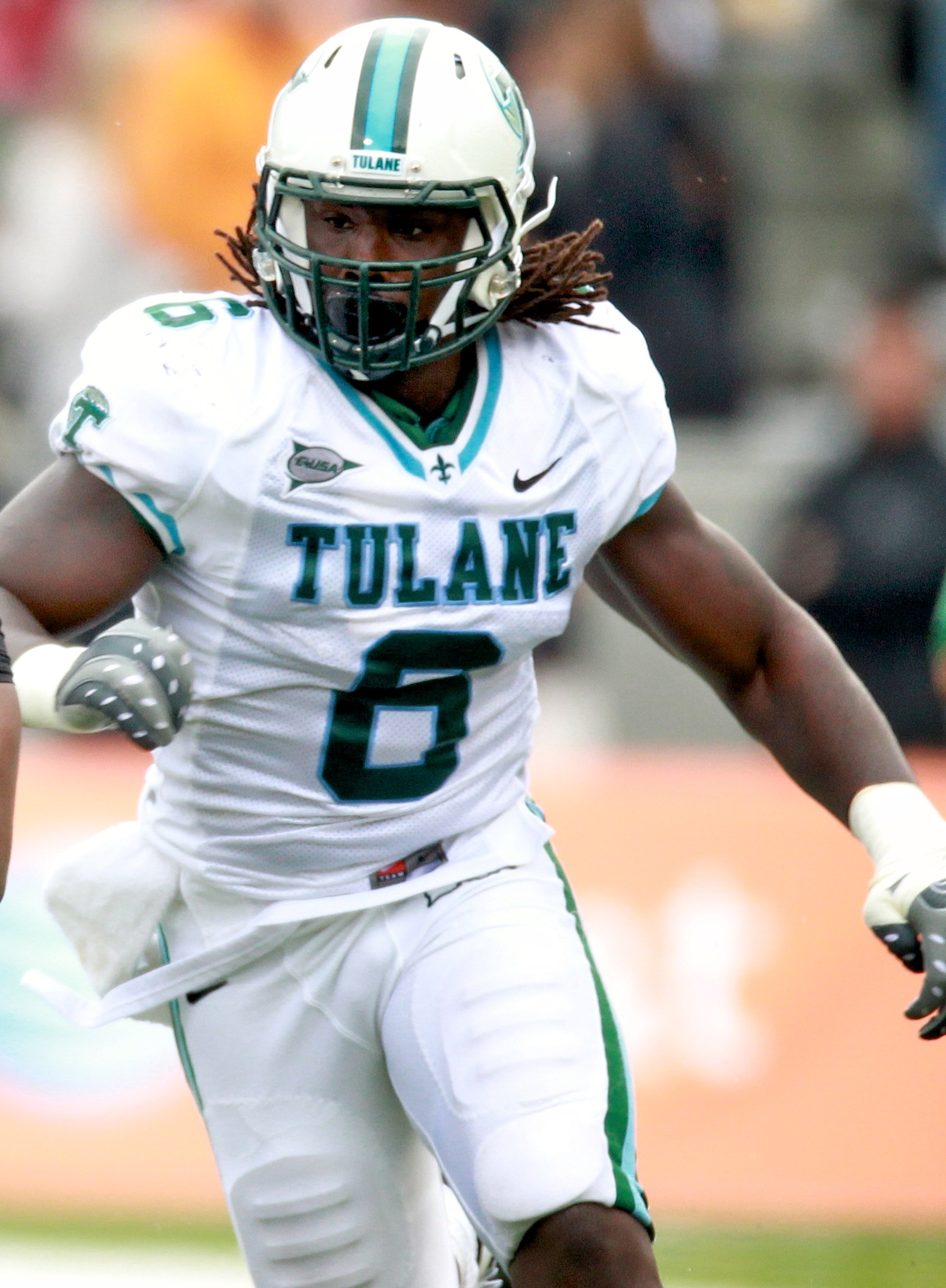
- Moses with the Tulane Green Wave in 2011

No. 54
- Position: Linebacker

Personal information
- Born: January 4, 1989 (age 37); Willingboro, New Jersey, U.S.
- Listed height: 6 ft 2 in (1.88 m)
- Listed weight: 249 lb (113 kg)

Career information
- High school: Willingboro
- College: Tulane
- NFL draft: 2012: undrafted

Career history
- Green Bay Packers (2012); Kansas City Chiefs (2013–2016)

Awards and highlights
- Second-team All-C-USA (2011)

Career NFL statistics
- Total tackles: 40
- Sacks: 4.0
- Forced fumbles: 1
- Stats at Pro Football Reference

Dezman Mirrill Moses (born January 4, 1989) is an American former professional football player who was a linebacker in the National Football League (NFL). He played college football for the Tulane Green Wave after transferring from the Iowa Hawkeyes. He was signed by the Green Bay Packers as an undrafted free agent in 2012. He also played for the Kansas City Chiefs.

== Early life ==
Born in Willingboro Township, New Jersey, Moses was a standout defensive end at Willingboro High School. As a senior, Moses garnered first-team all-county, all-conference, and all-South Jersey honors after being honored second-team all-county and all-conference as a junior. As a freshman and sophomore, he was named to third-team all-conference.

== Professional career ==
=== Green Bay Packers ===
After going undrafted in the 2012 NFL draft, Moses signed with the Green Bay Packers on May 11, 2012. He earned a spot on the Packers' 53-man roster in 2012. On October 28, Moses scored his first career touchdown by returning a blocked punt.

=== Kansas City Chiefs ===
Moses was claimed off waivers by the Kansas City Chiefs on September 1, 2013. On August 10, 2014, Moses was placed on the waived/injured list and after he cleared waivers; he was placed on injured reserve on August 12.

On September 10, 2016, Moses was released by the Chiefs. He was signed again by the Chiefs on September 14. Moses was released on October 7.
