= Ryan Grant (wide receiver) =

American football player (born 1990)

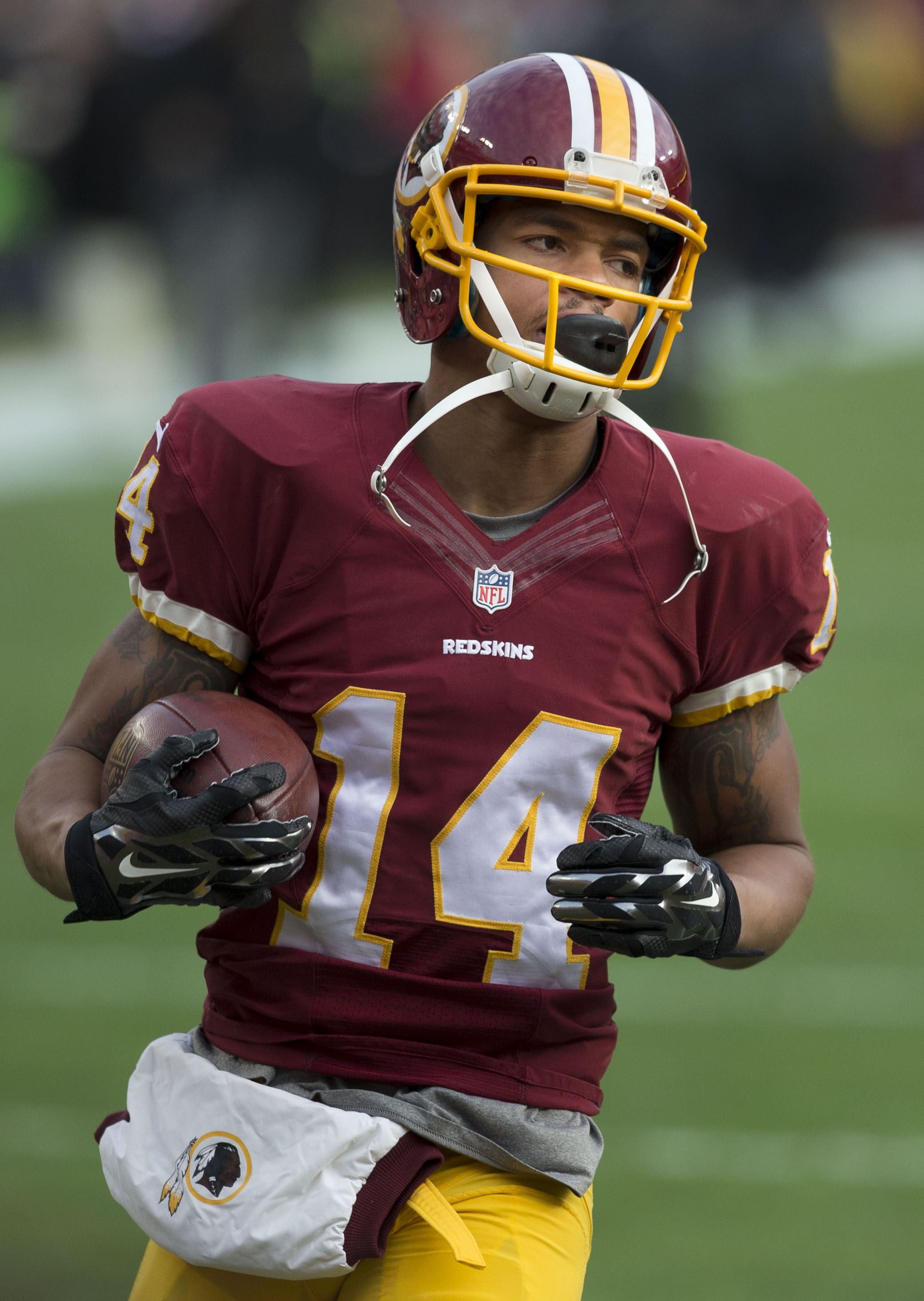
- Grant with the Washington Redskins in 2014

No. 14, 11, 19
- Position: Wide receiver

Personal information
- Born: December 19, 1990 (age 35); Beaumont, Texas, U.S.
- Listed height: 6 ft 0 in (1.83 m)
- Listed weight: 194 lb (88 kg)

Career information
- High school: West Brook (Beaumont)
- College: Tulane
- NFL draft: 2014: 5th round, 142nd overall pick

Career history
- Washington Redskins (2014–2017); Indianapolis Colts (2018); Oakland Raiders (2019); Green Bay Packers (2019); Calgary Stampeders (2021)*
- * Offseason or practice squad member only

Awards and highlights
- 2× First-team All-C-USA (2012, 2013)

Career NFL statistics
- Receptions: 123
- Receiving yards: 1,333
- Receiving touchdowns: 7
- Stats at Pro Football Reference

Ryan Joseph Grant (born December 19, 1990) is an American former professional football player who was a wide receiver in the National Football League (NFL). He played college football for the Tulane Green Wave and was selected by the Washington Redskins in the fifth round of the 2014 NFL draft.

== Early life ==
Grant was born in Beaumont, Texas and attended West Brook Senior High School, where he was a three-year letterman. He helped the Bruins win the District 21-5A title as a senior and advance to the state playoffs all three years. He was named first-team all-district as a senior after hauling in 42 receptions for 717 yards and seven touchdowns. As a junior, he caught 41 passes for 658 yards and four scores.

He was considered a two-star recruit by Rivals.com.

== College career ==
Grant attended Tulane University from 2009 to 2013. During his career, he played in 47 games, catching 196 passes for 2,769 yards and 21 touchdowns. In the 2012 season, he led the Conference USA (C-USA) in receiving yards with 1,149. He was named a first-team All-C-USA selection twice, receiving the honor consecutively between his junior and senior seasons.

== Professional career ==
Pre-draft measurables
Height	Weight	Arm length	Hand span	Wingspan	40-yard dash	10-yard split	20-yard split	20-yard shuttle	Three-cone drill	Vertical jump	Broad jump	Bench press
6 ft 0 3/8 in (1.84 m)	199 lb (90 kg)	31 in (0.79 m)	9 5/8 in (0.24 m)	6 ft 3 in (1.91 m)	4.53 s	1.59 s	2.53 s	4.11 s	6.68 s	35.5 in (0.90 m)	9 ft 11 in (3.02 m)	8 reps
All values from NFL Combine/Pro Day

=== Washington Redskins ===
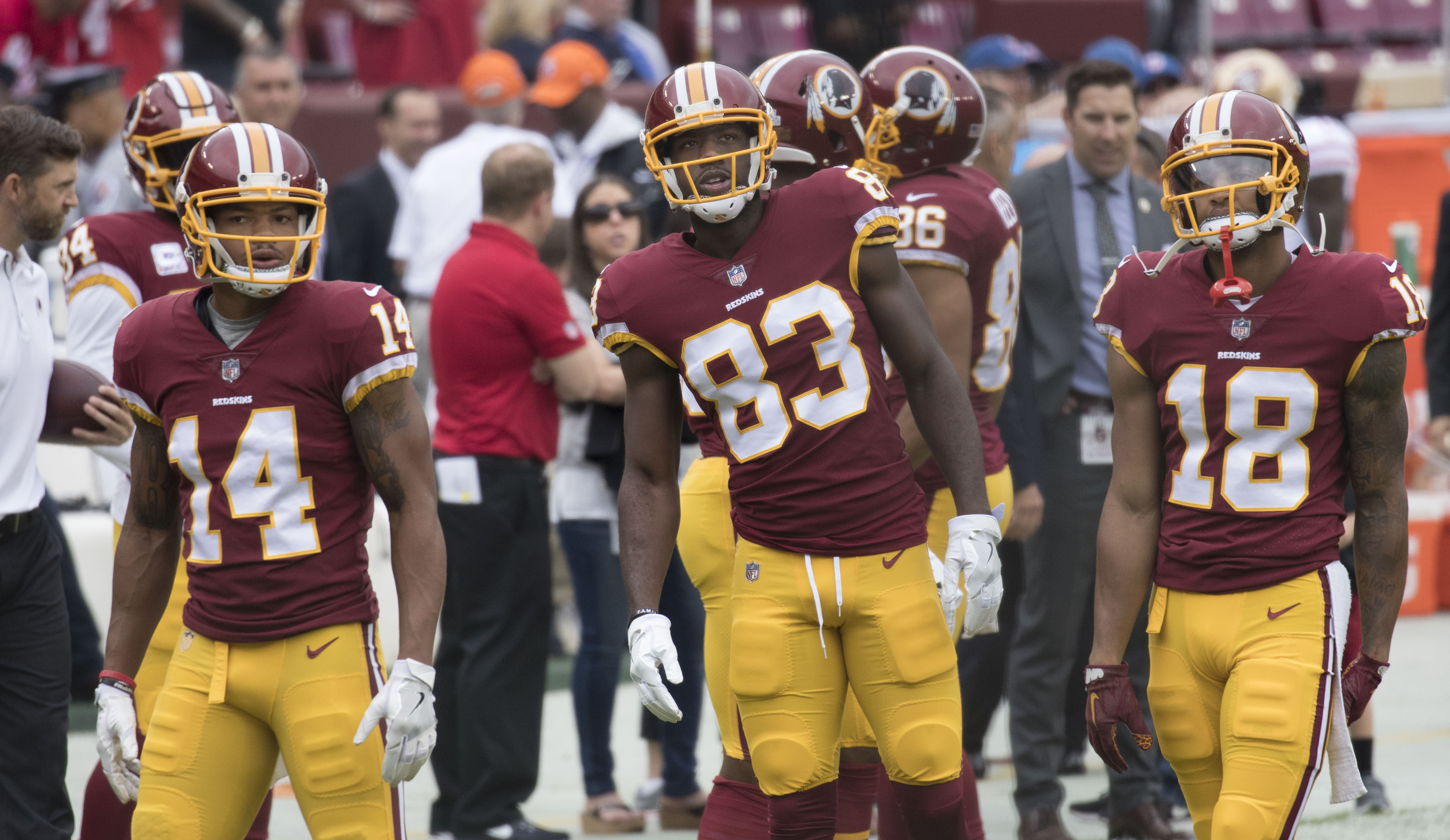
Grant standing with Brian Quick (83) and Josh Doctson (18) in a game against the San Francisco 49ers

Grant was selected by the Washington Redskins in the fifth round (142nd overall) of the 2014 NFL draft. On May 16, 2014, he signed a four-year, $2.36 million contract with the Redskins.

In 2015, Grant recorded his first career touchdown in the Week 7 win against the Tampa Bay Buccaneers which helped the Redskins comeback by its biggest deficit in Redskins franchise history. In the last game of the regular season against the Dallas Cowboys, Grant recorded his second career touchdown. In a Week 2 game against the Los Angeles Rams in September 2017, Grant caught a touchdown pass from quarterback Kirk Cousins late in the fourth quarter, helping the Redskins win by a score of 27–20.

=== Indianapolis Colts ===
On March 13, 2018, the Baltimore Ravens announced their intention to sign Grant to a four-year, $29 million contract with $14.5 million guaranteed. However, he failed his physical the next day, and the deal was voided making him a free agent. Grant ended up passing the Indianapolis Colts' physical and signed a one-year, $5 million contract with them on March 20. In 2018, Grant appeared in 14 contests and made a career-high 10 starts for the Colts. In the regular season, he tallied 35 receptions for 334 yards, marks that each ranked fifth on the squad, while adding one receiving touchdown.

=== Oakland Raiders ===
On April 3, 2019, Grant signed with the Oakland Raiders. Grant made his debut with the Raiders in Week 1 against the Denver Broncos. In the game, Grant made three catches for 16 yards in the 24–16 win. He was released by Oakland on September 25.

=== Green Bay Packers ===
On October 16, 2019, Grant signed with the Green Bay Packers.

=== Calgary Stampeders ===
On February 3, 2021, Grant signed with the Calgary Stampeders of the Canadian Football League. He was placed on the suspended list on July 10. Grant was released by the Stampeders on August 2.

== NFL career statistics ==
Regular season statistics
Year	Team	GP	GS	Receiving					Fumbles	
Year	Team	GP	GS	Rec	Yds	Avg	Lng	TD	FUM	Lost
2014	WAS	16	2	7	68	9.7	21	0	0	0
2015	WAS	16	5	23	268	11.7	35	2	0	0
2016	WAS	16	1	9	76	8.4	17	0	0	0
2017	WAS	16	7	45	573	12.7	40	4	0	0
2018	IND	14	10	35	334	9.5	23	1	0	0
2019	OAK	2	1	4	14	3.5	9	0	0	0
Total		80	26	123	1,333	10.8	40	7	0	0
Source: NFL.com
