= Patrick Durkin =

American businessman (1956–2020)

Patrick J. Durkin
- Education: Middlebury College; Dartmouth College
- Occupation: Businessman
- Employer: Barclays Capital

Patrick Durkin (December 26, 1956 – July 27, 2020) was an American businessman and senior staff level political and public official. He was the managing director at Barclays and co-head of government relations and public policy. Prior to that he was a managing director in asset management and banking at Credit Suisse and Donaldson Lufkin and Jenrette.

== Personal life and education ==
Durkin received his bachelor's degree from Middlebury College and an MBA from Dartmouth College. He was married to Kristen Staples and had three children, Kate, Austin, and Luke. Durkin lived in New York in his later life and grew up in Greenwich, CT.

== Business and political career ==
Durkin served as a legislative assistant in the U.S. House of Representatives, and later worked as a speech writer for Secretary of the Treasury Donald Regan during the Reagan Administration. Durkin worked at Credit Suisse for 23 years, ending his tenure as managing director of the Investment Management and Investment Banking Divisions. Durkin last served as managing director for Barclays Capital, and was a high-ranking lobbyist for Barclays.

Durkin served on the boards of the National Fish and Wildlife Foundation, the American Red Cross of Greater New York, and the Cancer Research Institute. Durkin was a member of the Council on Foreign Relations, and was a member of the Council for Excellence in Government.

== Political activities ==
In 2012, Durkin and Barclays were criticized by British MPs for raising money for Romney in the midst of the Libor scandal; Durkin raised over $1 million. Durkin's former boss, Bob Diamond, was mentioned as a possible Secretary of the Treasury in a Romney administration, in part due to Durkin's backing. Politico named Durkin one of the Republican "Money Men to Watch" for the 2016 presidential election.
