= Selwyn Brown (American football) =

American football player (born 1965)

No. 28
- Position: Defensive back

Personal information
- Born: September 28, 1965 (age 61); St. Petersburg, Florida, U.S.
- Listed height: 5 ft 11 in (1.80 m)
- Listed weight: 205 lb (93 kg)

Career information
- High school: St. Petersburg (FL) Northeast
- College: Miami (FL)
- NFL draft: 1988: undrafted

Career history
- Miami Dolphins (1988)*; Tampa Bay Buccaneers (1988)
- * Offseason or practice squad member only
- Stats at Pro Football Reference

Selwyn Brown (born September 28, 1965) is an American former professional football defensive back. He played for the Tampa Bay Buccaneers in 1988.

Brown, a former college defensive back, won a national title with the Miami Hurricanes in 1987. He was a 1985 First Team All-South Independent.
