= Roydell Williams (wide receiver) =

American football player (born 1981)

No. 86, 87
- Position: Wide receiver

Personal information
- Born: March 14, 1981 (age 45); New Orleans, Louisiana, U.S.
- Listed height: 6 ft 0 in (1.83 m)
- Listed weight: 178 lb (81 kg)

Career information
- High school: East St. John (Reserve, Louisiana)
- College: Tulane
- NFL draft: 2005: 4th round, 136th overall pick

Career history
- Tennessee Titans (2005–2007); Washington Redskins (2009–2010)

Career NFL statistics
- Receptions: 92
- Receiving yards: 1,248
- Receiving touchdowns: 6
- Stats at Pro Football Reference

Roydell Williams (born March 14, 1981) is an American former professional football player who was a wide receiver in the National Football League (NFL). He played college football for the Tulane Green Wave and was selected by the Tennessee Titans in the fourth round of the 2005 NFL draft with the 136th overall pick.

Williams also played for the Washington Redskins.

== Early life ==
Williams attended East St. John High School in Reserve, Louisiana. He was named All-Metro, All-River Parish, and All-State Blue Chip while catching 53 passes for 1,101 yards and 23 touchdowns. He was also All-District in basketball and All-State in baseball. Williams was drafted by the Cincinnati Reds in the fifth round of the 2000 Major League Baseball draft.

== College career ==
Williams owns the Tulane school record as well as the Conference USA career receiving touchdown record of 35. Williams is currently enrolled at George Washington University studying to get his Masters of Exercise Science.

== Professional career ==
Pre-draft measurables
| Height | Weight | 40-yard dash | Vertical jump |
|---|---|---|---|
| 6 ft 1 3/8 in (1.86 m) | 195 lb (88 kg) | 4.52 s | 38.0 in (0.97 m) |
All values from NFL Combine/Pro Day

In the 2005 season, Williams had 21 receptions for 299 yards and two touchdowns as a rookie.
