= Lorenzo Doss =

American football player (born 1994)

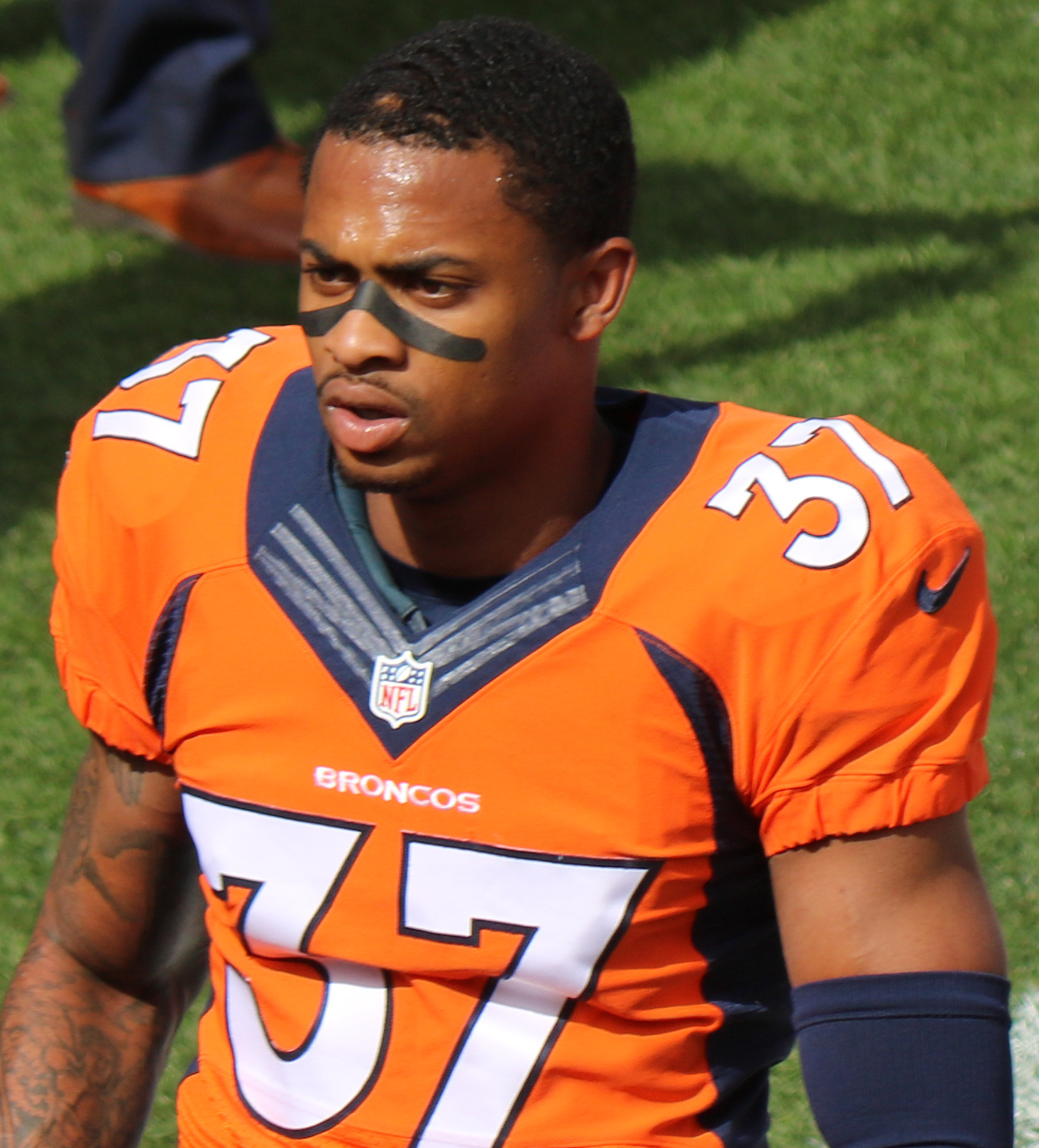
- Doss with the Denver Broncos in 2016

No. 37, 31
- Position: Cornerback

Personal information
- Born: April 22, 1994 (age 32); New Orleans, Louisiana, U.S.
- Listed height: 5 ft 11 in (1.80 m)
- Listed weight: 185 lb (84 kg)

Career information
- High school: St. Augustine (New Orleans)
- College: Tulane
- NFL draft: 2015: 5th round, 164th overall pick

Career history
- Denver Broncos (2015–2017); Buffalo Bills (2017)*; Carolina Panthers (2018)
- * Offseason or practice squad member only

Awards and highlights
- Super Bowl champion (50); First-team All-C-USA (2013)

Career NFL statistics
- Total tackles: 6
- Pass deflections: 2
- Stats at Pro Football Reference

Lorenzo Doss (born April 22, 1994) is an American former professional football player who was a cornerback in the National Football League (NFL). He played college football for the Tulane Green Wave before being selected by the Denver Broncos in the fifth round of the 2015 NFL draft. Doss was on the Broncos Super Bowl 50 championship team.

== Early life ==
Doss attended St. Augustine High School in New Orleans, Louisiana, where he was a letterman in football, baseball and track. A teammate of Leonard Fournette, Doss helped lead the Purple Knights to a combined 26–18 record with a pair of state playoff appearances, including a district title as a senior. As a junior, he was named first-team All-District 10-5A and second-team All-metro after catching 23 passes for 352 yards and three touchdowns. He was named honorable-mention 4A All-state and first-team All-District 10-4A as a senior after catching 15 passes for 330 yards (22.0 avg.) while running four times for 35 yards (4.8 avg.). He was selected to represent Orleans Parish in the 2011 Lake Pontchartrain All-Star Classic. Off the field, was a member of the Honor Roll.

Doss also lettered twice in track & field. He competed as a sprinter, and posted bests of 11.2 in the 100 meters, 22.67 in the 200 meters and 51.44 in the 400 meters. He was also a member of the 4x400 relay.

Doss was tabbed the No. 30 recruit in Louisiana by 247Sports.com and No. 76 recruit in the state by ESPN.com. He was listed as the No. 65 athlete in the nation by 247Sports.com, No. 164 wide receiver in the country by Scout.com and No. 233 receiver nationally by ESPN.com. He received an 85 Sports Rating from 247Sports.com and a 70 Scout Grade from ESPN.com. He was rated as a three-star recruit by Rivals.com, Scout.com, and 247Sports.com. In June 2011, he committed to Tulane University to play college football.

== College career ==
Doss became a cornerback at Tulane after playing wide receiver in high school. As a freshman in 2012, he started nine of 12 games, recording 44 tackles and five interceptions. As a sophomore in 2013, he started all 13 games, recording 34 tackles and seven interceptions. As a junior in 2014, Doss had 48 tackles and three interceptions. He was also a member of Tulane's track and field program where he competed in the 100 meter, 4x100 meter relay and 4x400 meter relay team.

On December 11, 2014, Doss announced that he would forgo his senior season and enter the 2015 NFL draft. He finished his career with 126 tackles and 15 interceptions.

== Professional career ==
=== Denver Broncos ===
Doss was selected by the Denver Broncos in the fifth round, 164th overall, in the 2015 NFL draft.

On February 7, 2016, Doss was part of the Broncos team that won Super Bowl 50. In the game, the Broncos defeated the Carolina Panthers by a score of 24–10. He was inactive for the game.

On November 23, 2017, Doss was waived by the Broncos for being late to a meeting on Thanksgiving.

=== Buffalo Bills ===
On November 27, 2017, Doss was signed to the practice squad of the Buffalo Bills. He was released on December 30, 2017.

=== Carolina Panthers ===
On January 2, 2018, Doss signed a futures contract with the Panthers. He was waived on September 1, 2018, but was re-signed the next day. Doss was waived again on September 27, 2018 and was re-signed to the practice squad. He was promoted to the active roster on November 27, 2018.

Doss was released during final roster cuts on August 30, 2019.

Doss was selected by the New York Guardians of the XFL in the 2nd round during phase four in the 2020 XFL draft.
