= André Anderson (American football, born 1988) =

American football player (born 1988)

Profile
- Position: Running back

Personal information
- Born: May 1, 1988 (age 38); Ft. Lauderdale, Florida, U.S.
- Listed height: 6 ft 0 in (1.83 m)
- Listed weight: 212 lb (96 kg)

Career information
- High school: Stephenson (Stone Mountain, Georgia)
- College: Tulane
- NFL draft: 2010: undrafted

Career history
- Buffalo Bills (2010); Seattle Seahawks (2010)*
- * Offseason or practice squad member only

Career NFL statistics
- Games played: 2
- Stats at Pro Football Reference

André Anthony Anderson (born May 1, 1988) is an American former professional football player who was a running back in the National Football League (NFL). He played his college football for the Tulane Green Wave.

== Professional career ==
Anderson went undrafted in the 2010 NFL draft. On April 24, Anderson signed a contract with the Buffalo Bills. He was cut by the Bills during final cuts on September 4, 2010, but was re-signed to their practice squad on September 21, 2010. On October 6, 2010, Anderson was promoted to the Bills' 53-man active roster.
