= Terrence Jones (gridiron football) =

American gridiron football player (born 1966)

No. 6, 9
- Position: Quarterback

Personal information
- Born: June 18, 1966 (age 60); New Orleans, Louisiana, U.S.
- Listed height: 6 ft 1 in (1.85 m)
- Listed weight: 210 lb (95 kg)

Career information
- College: Tulane
- NFL draft: 1989: 7th round, 195th overall pick

Career history
- Calgary Stampeders (1989–1991); Ottawa Rough Riders (1992–1993); Shreveport Pirates (1994–1995); Connecticut Coyotes (1996)

Career CFL statistics
- Comp. / Att.: 232 / 521
- Passing yards: 3,611
- TD–INT: 12-36
- Passer rating: 47
- Rushing TD: 10

Career AFL statistics
- Comp. / Att.: 41 / 85
- Passing yards: 568
- TD–INT: 10 - 3
- Passer rating: 84.83
- Rushing TD: 0
- Stats at ArenaFan.com

Terrence Jones (born June 18, 1966) is a former quarterback in the Canadian Football League (CFL), where he played from 1989 to 1995 for three teams. Jones played college football at Tulane University, where he was a 1987 2nd team All-South Independent selection. He was selected by the San Diego Chargers in the 1989 NFL draft. The Chargers wanted him to move to defensive back. He moved to the CFL to play quarterback.

In 2004, he was an English teacher at Marion Abramson High School in New Orleans.

Pre-draft measurables
Height	Weight	40-yard dash	10-yard split	20-yard split	20-yard shuttle	Vertical jump
6 ft 1 1/4 in (1.86 m)	209 lb (95 kg)	4.64 s	1.61 s	2.71 s	4.34 s	34.0 in (0.86 m)
