= Rick Kingrea =

American football player (born 1949)

No. 58, 54, 53
- Position: Linebacker

Personal information
- Born: July 18, 1949 (age 77); Pearisburg, Virginia, U.S.
- Listed height: 6 ft 1 in (1.85 m)
- Listed weight: 233 lb (106 kg)

Career information
- High school: Baton Rouge (LA)
- College: Tulane
- NFL draft: 1971: 14th round, 352nd overall pick

Career history
- Cleveland Browns (1971–1972); Buffalo Bills (1973); New Orleans Saints (1973–1978)

Awards and highlights
- Second-team All-American (1970)

Career NFL statistics
- Sacks: 1
- Fumble recoveries: 8
- Interceptions: 1
- Stats at Pro Football Reference

Richard Owen Kingrea (born July 18, 1949) is an American former professional football player who was a linebacker for eight seasons in the National Football League (NFL) for the Cleveland Browns, Buffalo Bills, and the New Orleans Saints. He played college football for the Tulane Green Wave. After football, Kingrea became an attorney and served as City Councilman in Fairhope, Alabama.
