= Marc Zeno =

American football player (born 1965)

No. 11, 2
- Position: Wide receiver

Personal information
- Born: June 21, 1965 (age 61); New Orleans, Louisiana, U.S.
- Listed height: 6 ft 3 in (1.91 m)
- Listed weight: 205 lb (93 kg)

Career information
- High school: Lutcher (Lutcher, Louisiana)
- College: Tulane (1984–1987)
- NFL draft: 1988: 7th round, 182nd overall pick

Career history
- Pittsburgh Steelers (1988)*; Green Bay Packers (1989)*; Calgary Stampeders (1989); Toronto Argonauts (1990)*; BC Lions (1990); Raleigh-Durham Skyhawks (1991)*; Tampa Bay Storm (1991); Shreveport Pirates (1994)*
- * Offseason or practice squad member only

Awards and highlights
- ArenaBowl champion (1991)
- Stats at ArenaFan.com

Marc Zeno (born May 21, 1965) is an American former professional football player who was a wide receiver in the Canadian Football League (CFL). He played college football for the Tulane Green Wave.

== College ==
Zeno attended Tulane University from 1984 to 1987, where he played wide receiver and broke the National Collegiate Athletic Association career receiving record with 3,725 yards. He was a 1985 Second Team All-South independent, 1986 First Team all-South Independent and named to the 1987 All-American team.

== Professional career ==
In 1988, Zeno was selected in the seventh round (182nd overall) of the 1988 NFL draft by the Pittsburgh Steelers. Zeno's draft valued dropped from its original expectation because his poor performance at the National Football league combined with off-season knee injuries. He ran a 4.8 40-yard dash. Zeno responded to his performance by saying "I'm capable of running a 4.6 in the 40, but I'm not capable of running a 4.3 or 4.4, and they should know that. I'm a football player, not a track star." In 1989, he was a member of the Green Bay Packers training camp but was released on July 27, 1989. Later he signed with the Calgary Stampeders. In 1990, he was a member of the British Columbia Lions. In 1991, he was the 80th wide receiver drafted in the WLAF Draft by the Raleigh–Durham Skyhawks. In 1991, he played for the Tampa Bay Storm of the Arena Football League.
