= Ryan Griffin (quarterback) =

American football player and coach (born 1989)

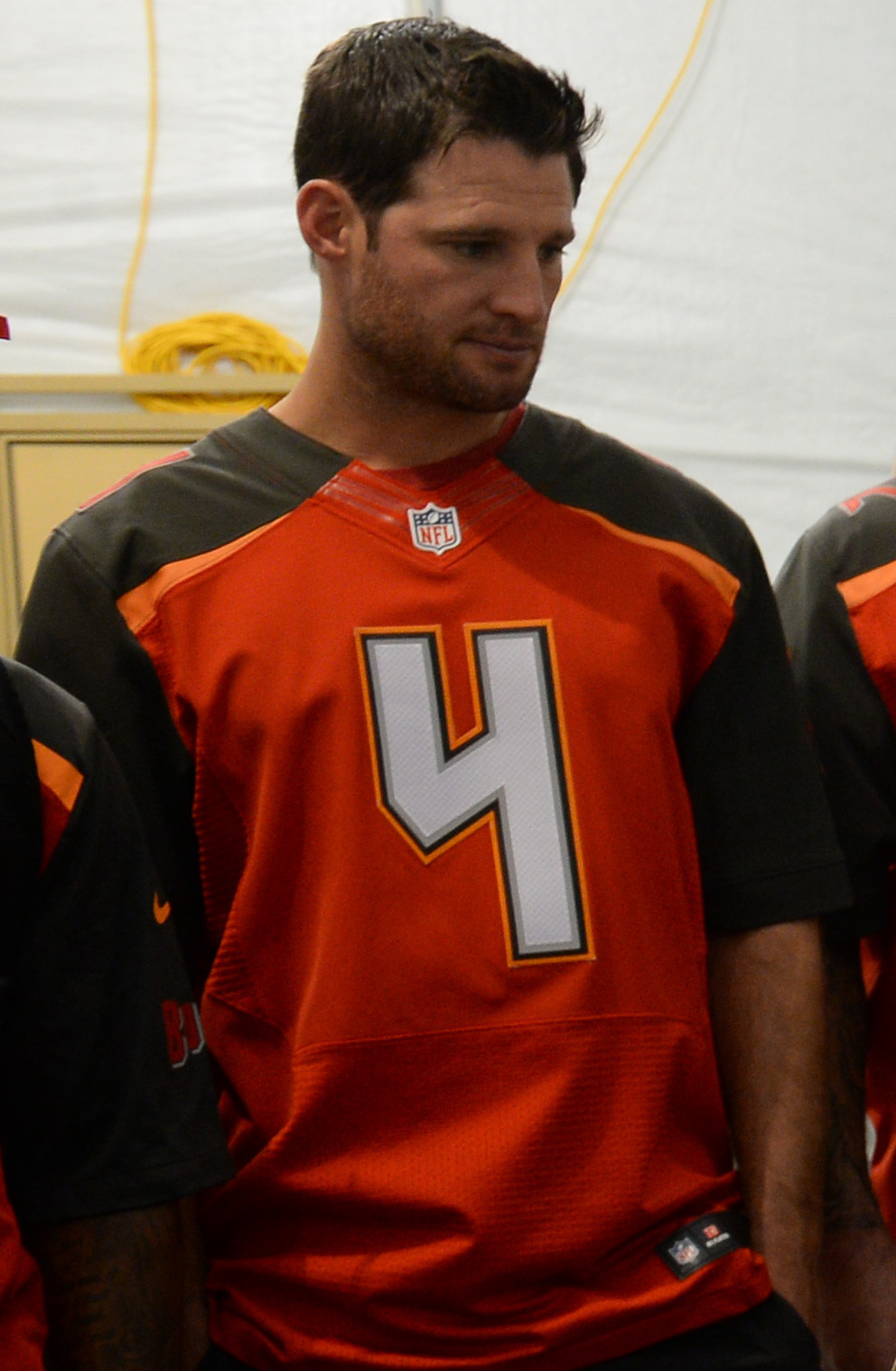
- Griffin with the Tampa Bay Buccaneers in 2017

No. 4
- Position: Quarterback

Personal information
- Born: November 17, 1989 (age 37); Santa Monica, California, U.S.
- Listed height: 6 ft 4 in (1.93 m)
- Listed weight: 218 lb (99 kg)

Career information
- High school: Chaminade College Preparatory (Los Angeles, California)
- College: Tulane (2008–2012)
- NFL draft: 2013: undrafted

Career history

Playing
- New Orleans Saints (2013–2014); Tampa Bay Buccaneers (2015–2022); Skorpions Varese (2024)

Coaching
- Chicago Bears (2024) Offensive Assistant QB/WR

Awards and highlights
- Super Bowl champion (LV); All Conference USA (2012); Italian Football League MVP (2024)

Career NFL statistics
- TD–INT: 0–0
- Passing yards: 18
- QB rating: 62.5
- Completion percentage: 50.0
- Stats at Pro Football Reference

Ryan Walsh Griffin (born November 17, 1989) is an American former professional football player who was a quarterback in the National Football League (NFL). He played college football for the Tulane Green Wave. He was signed by the New Orleans Saints as an undrafted free agent in 2013. Griffin earned a Super Bowl ring with the Tampa Bay Buccaneers for the 2020 season. He was signed by the Skorpions Varese of the Italian Football League (IFL) as quarterback/Offensive Coordinator in the spring of 2024. After the season Griffin joined the Chicago Bears coaching staff as an Offensive Assistant QB/WR Coach.

== College career ==
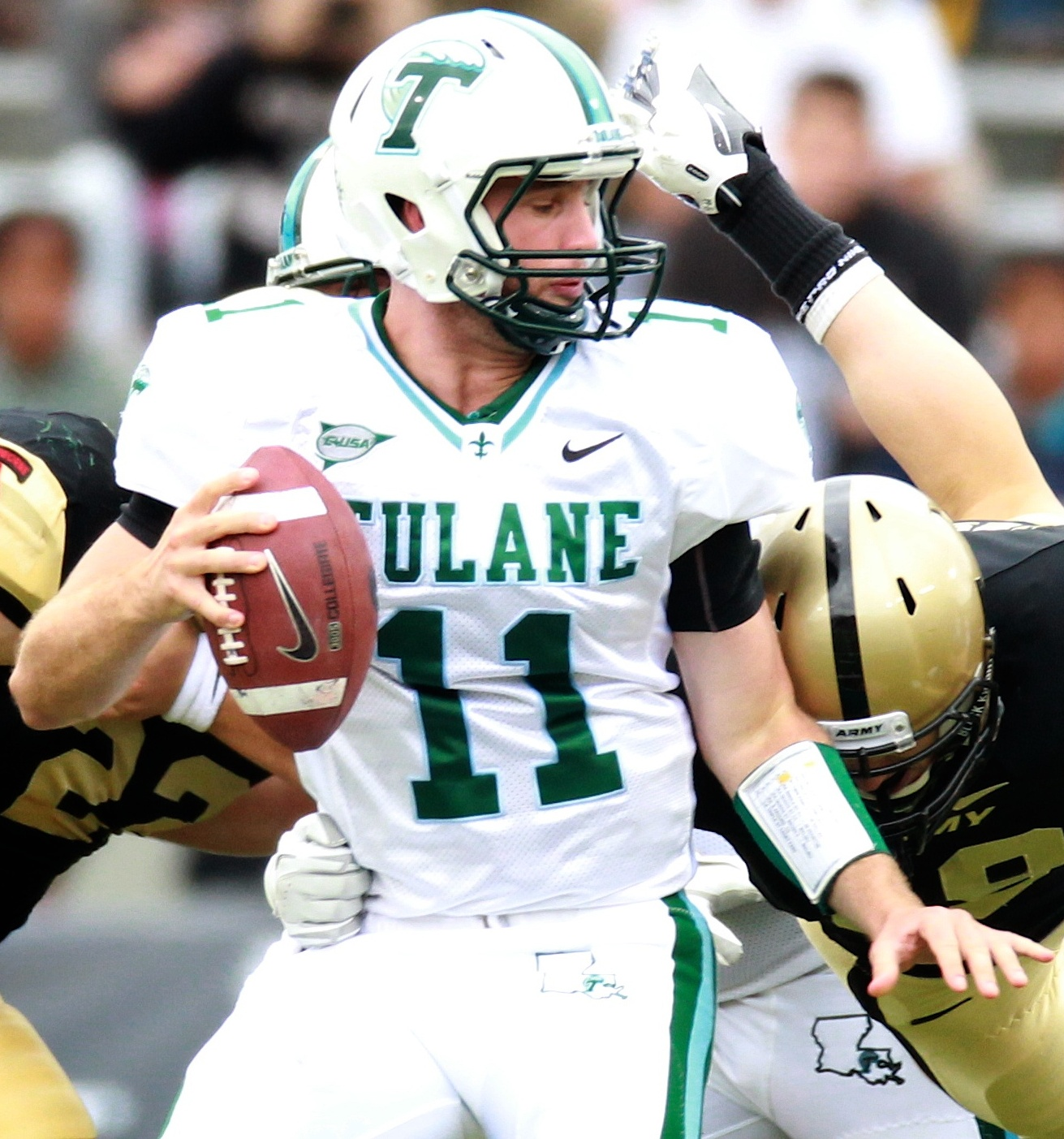
Griffin with Tulane in 2011

At Tulane, after redshirting for the 2008 season, Ryan Griffin played in nine games of the 2009 season. He led the team in total offense, passing attempts, completions, passing yards, and touchdown passes, while finishing 2nd in completion percentage and passing efficiency. All of his offensive numbers stand as Tulane records for a freshman quarterback.

Griffin started all 11 games he played in as a sophomore in the 2010 season, and ranked 6th in Conference USA in passing yards per game, 8th in total offensive yards per game, and 10th in passing efficiency. He gained more than 300 yards in 3 games, including a season-best 412 yards against Tulsa.

In the 2011 season, he started all 13 games and once again led the team in total offense, pass attempts, completions, passing yards, touchdown passes, and passing efficiency.

As a senior in the 2012 season, he started all nine games he played in and was given an honorable-mention spot on the All-Conference USA team. He finished the season ranked 2nd in C-USA in passing yards per game and yards of total offense per game, and 5th in passing efficiency. Griffin threw for 300-plus yards 5 times with two 400-plus yard games, and twice set the school single-game passing record. He set the record the first time with 466 yards and a career-best 5 touchdown passes vs UAB and surpassed that with 476 yards and 4 touchdowns vs Rice. Griffin holds the Tulane career records in pass attempts, completions, and completion percentage. He is 2nd in passing yards, passing yards per game, pass attempts per game, completions per game, and 300-yard passing games. Griffin finished his college career with 9,026 yards, 56 touchdowns, and 35 interceptions.

=== Statistics ===
Season	Passing							
Season	Cmp	Att	Pct	Yds	Avg	TD	Int	Rtg
2009	142	222	63.5	1,382	6.2	9	6	123.8
2010	223	372	59.9	2,371	6.4	14	8	121.6
2011	227	408	55.6	2,502	6.1	13	10	112.8
2012	245	394	62.3	2,771	7.0	20	11	132.4
Career	836	1,396	59.9	9,026	6.5	56	35	122.4

== Professional playing career ==
Pre-draft measurables
Height	Weight	Arm length	Hand span	40-yard dash	10-yard split	20-yard split	20-yard shuttle	Three-cone drill	Vertical jump	Broad jump
6 ft 3 7/8 in (1.93 m)	221 lb (100 kg)	31 1/4 in (0.79 m)	9 3/8 in (0.24 m)	5.20 s	1.82 s	3.02 s	4.78 s	7.64 s	25.5 in (0.65 m)	8 ft 5 in (2.57 m)
All values from Pro Day

=== New Orleans Saints ===
Griffin signed with the New Orleans Saints as an undrafted free agent following the 2013 NFL draft. He was released on August 31, 2013. On September 1, 2013, Griffin re-signed to the Saints' Practice Squad. He was placed on the active roster on October 22, 2013, only after the St. Louis Rams offered Griffin an opportunity to sign with them. To facilitate Griffin's signing to the active roster, linebacker Martez Wilson was waived.

On September 2, 2014, it was announced that the Saints had waived Griffin and re-signed kicker Shayne Graham to the 53-man roster. After clearing waivers on September 3, 2014, Griffin was re-signed to the Saints practice squad. To make room for Griffin, linebacker Todd Davis was released from the practice squad.

Griffin was released on September 5, 2015, for final roster cuts before the start of the season.

=== Tampa Bay Buccaneers ===
On September 6, 2015, Griffin was claimed off waivers by the Buccaneers. In 2015 and 2016, Griffin was the Buccaneers' third-string quarterback behind Jameis Winston and Mike Glennon, and did not see any game action.

On August 30, 2017, Griffin signed a one-year contract extension with the Buccaneers. He was placed on injured reserve on September 4, after suffering a shoulder injury in the preseason. Griffin was activated off injured reserve to the active roster on November 7, to back up Ryan Fitzpatrick after starter Winston was sidelined with an injury.

On March 12, 2019, Griffin signed a two-year contract extension with the Buccaneers. In Week 14 of the 2019 season against the Indianapolis Colts, he made his NFL debut, starting the second half for the Buccaneers as Winston suffered a hand injury late in the second quarter. Griffin completed 2 of 4 passes for 18 yards on a 6-play drive that resulted in a Bradley Pinion punt. Winston returned to the game on the next Buccaneers possession and finished the game for a 38–35 victory.

Griffin re-signed with the Buccaneers again on April 20, 2021.

On August 31, 2021, Griffin was released by the Buccaneers and re-signed to the practice squad the next day.

On March 31, 2022, the Buccaneers re-signed Griffin. He was released on August 30, and re-signed to the team's practice squad the following day.

=== Skorpions Varese ===
On November 10, 2023, Griffin signed with the Skorpions Varese in the Italian Football League (IFL) to play quarterback and be the team's Offensive Coordinator. Griffin led the Scorpions to an 8–0 regular season before losing 24–7 in the semi final of the playoffs to the Parma Panthers. In the regular season, he passed for 1,974 yards and 25 touchdowns against 4 interceptions. Leading the league in passing efficiency. The league awarded him the Italian Football League MVP for the season.

== Professional coaching career ==
On February 23, 2024, the Chicago Bears hired Griffin as an offensive assistant specifically working with the team's quarterbacks and wide receivers.
