= Burnell Dent =

American football player (born 1963)

No. 56
- Position: Linebacker

Personal information
- Born: March 16, 1963 (age 63); New Orleans, Louisiana, U.S.
- Listed height: 6 ft 1 in (1.85 m)
- Listed weight: 236 lb (107 kg)

Career information
- High school: Destrehan (Destrehan, Louisiana)
- College: Tulane
- NFL draft: 1986: 6th round, 143rd overall pick

Career history
- Green Bay Packers (1986–1992); Detroit Lions (1993)*; New York Giants (1993)
- * Offseason or practice squad member only

Career NFL statistics
- Sacks: 4.5
- Interceptions: 1
- Fumble recoveries: 2
- Stats at Pro Football Reference

Burnell Joseph Dent (born March 16, 1963) is an American former professional football player who was a linebacker in the National Football League (NFL). He played college football for the Tulane Green Wave.

== Playing career ==
=== High school career ===
Dent from St. Rose, Louisiana, played high school football at Destrehan High School in Destrehan, Louisiana, where he became the school's all-time leading tackler and was named All-State in 1981.

=== College career ===
Dent played collegiately at Tulane University from 1982 to 1985. He finished his career as the Green Wave's all-time leader in career tackles with 492 and tackles in a season with 172. He was a 1984 Second Team All-South Independent, 1985 First Team All-South Independent Selection. In 1998, Dent was inducted into the Tulane Athletics Hall of Fame.

=== Professional career ===
Dent was selected in the sixth round of the 1986 NFL draft by the Green Bay Packers. He played linebacker for the Packers from 1986 to 1992 and the New York Giants in 1993. He played in 95 games in his NFL career, with a total of 4.5 sacks and an interception.
