= Ray Hester =

American football player (1949–1977)

Profile
- Position: Linebacker

Personal information
- Born: March 31, 1949; New Orleans, Louisiana, U.S.
- Died: May 15, 1977 (aged 28); New Orleans, Louisiana, U.S.

Career information
- High school: Holy Cross (LA)
- College: Tulane
- NFL draft: 1971

Career history
- 1971–1973: New Orleans Saints
- 1974: The Hawaiians
- Stats at Pro Football Reference

Ray Hester (March 31, 1949 – May 15, 1977) was an American professional football player who played linebacker for the New Orleans Saints from 1971 to 1973, and The Hawaiians of the WFL in 1974. He was diagnosed with leukemia in 1975. He died from leukemia at the age of 28.
