= Shaun King (American football) =

American football player and coach (born 1977)

No. 10, 4
- Position: Quarterback

Personal information
- Born: May 29, 1977 (age 49); St. Petersburg, Florida, U.S.
- Listed height: 6 ft 1 in (1.85 m)
- Listed weight: 228 lb (103 kg)

Career information
- High school: Gibbs (St. Petersburg)
- College: Tulane (1995–1998)
- NFL draft: 1999: 2nd round, 50th overall pick

Career history

Playing
- Tampa Bay Buccaneers (1999–2003); Arizona Cardinals (2004); Detroit Lions (2006)*; Indianapolis Colts (2006)*; Las Vegas Gladiators (2007); Hamilton Tiger-Cats (2007)*
- * Offseason or practice squad member only

Coaching
- Gibbs HS (FL) (2006) Assistant head coach & quarterbacks coach; Gibbs HS (FL) (2008) Quarterbacks coach; South Florida (2016) Quarterbacks coach; South Florida (2017–2019) Running backs coach

Awards and highlights
- Super Bowl champion (XXXVII); 2× C-USA Offensive Player of the Year (1997, 1998)

Career NFL statistics
- Passing attempts: 738
- Passing completions: 415
- Completion percentage: 56.2%
- TD–INT: 27–24
- Passing yards: 4,566
- Passer rating: 73.4
- Rushing yards: 454
- Rushing touchdowns: 5
- Stats at Pro Football Reference

Career AFL statistics
- Comp. / Att.: 132 / 228
- Passing yards: 1,635
- TD–INT: 27–8
- Passer rating: 95.19
- Rushing touchdowns: 2
- Stats at ArenaFan.com

Shaun Earl King (born May 29, 1977) is an American former professional football player who was a quarterback in the National Football League (NFL). He played college football for the Tulane Green Wave and was selected in the second round of the 1999 NFL draft by the Tampa Bay Buccaneers. King was also a member of the NFL's Arizona Cardinals, Indianapolis Colts, and Detroit Lions, as well as the Las Vegas Gladiators of the Arena Football League (AFL) and Hamilton Tiger-Cats of the Canadian Football League (CFL).

After his playing career, he was an assistant college coach for the South Florida Bulls. He later became an afternoon co-host on the Las Vegas sports wagering channel, VSiN.

== College career ==
After graduating from Gibbs High School in 1995, King played college football at Tulane University from 1995 to 1998, leading Tulane to an undefeated season and a win over Brigham Young University in the Liberty Bowl, in the process setting the then single-season NCAA Division I-A record for passing efficiency in 1998 of 183.3. In the same year he became the first player in NCAA history to both pass for 300 yards and rush for 100 yards in the same game against Army on November 14. His quarterback coach was Rich Rodriguez and his head coach was Tommy Bowden. He finished 10th in voting for the 1998 Heisman Trophy. King is a member of Kappa Alpha Psi fraternity. King co-captained the 1998 12–0 Green Wave along with right tackle Dennis O'Sullivan. The style of offense that King ran at Tulane under Bowden was the Spread offense which is now a very popular style in NCAA football.

=== College statistics ===
Season	Team	GP	Passing							Rushing			
Season	Team	GP	Cmp	Att	Pct	Yds	TD	Int	Rtg	Att	Yds	Avg	TD
1995	Tulane	8	92	199	46.2	1,046	2	7	86.7	46	−10	−0.2	3
1996	Tulane	11	132	273	48.4	1,574	8	7	101.3	43	16	0.4	1
1997	Tulane	11	199	363	54.8	2,567	24	14	128.3	124	511	4.1	5
1998	Tulane	11	223	328	68.0	3,232	36	6	183.3	140	532	3.8	10
College career		41	646	1,163	55.5	8,419	70	34	130.4	353	1,049	3.0	19

== Professional career ==
Pre-draft measurables
Height	Weight	Arm length	Hand span	40-yard dash	10-yard split	20-yard split	20-yard shuttle	Vertical jump	Wonderlic
6 ft 0 in (1.83 m)	221 lb (100 kg)	30 1/2 in (0.77 m)	9 1/4 in (0.23 m)	4.77 s	1.65 s	2.73 s	4.29 s	33.0 in (0.84 m)	25
All values from NFL Combine

=== Tampa Bay Buccaneers ===
King was drafted in the second round of the 1999 NFL draft by the Tampa Bay Buccaneers, his hometown team. King was labeled as inactive for the first seven games of the season and did not play in any of the first ten games of the 1999 season. He was thrust into playing when Trent Dilfer suffered an injury to his right collarbone against the Seattle Seahawks. King went 3-of-7 and threw his first touchdown pass in a 16–3 victory. Dilfer was soon found to have broken his collarbone and was ruled to be out for the rest of the season. With Eric Zeier nursing a rib injury, King was thrust into the starting quarterback role for the rest of the season. King started his first game against the Minnesota Vikings on December 6, going 11-of-19 for 93 yards with two touchdowns and an interception in a 24–17 victory. King won four of his five starts as the Buccaneers won the NFC Central title and won a first-round bye.

In the Divisional Round, they were matched against Washington Redskins, with King being the first rookie quarterback to start a postseason game since Todd Marinovich in 1991. In the game, King went 15-of-32 for 157 yards with a touchdown and an interception while being sacked twice as the Buccaneers rallied from a 13–0 deficit in the fourth quarter to take a late lead before a bobbled snap on a field goal attempt ended the game with a 14–13 victory for Tampa Bay. In addition to being the first rookie quarterback to win a playoff game since Pat Haden in 1976, King became the first rookie quarterback in the Super Bowl era to start a Conference Championship game. The Buccaneers were matched up against the St. Louis Rams in the NFC Championship Game that was a tight defensive affair. A high snap on a routine play resulted in King having to bat the ball into the end zone, resulting a safety. The Buccaneers led in the fourth quarter before an interception on a King pass gave the ball to St. Louis at Tampa Bay's 47. St. Louis converted it into a go-ahead touchdown drive to give Tampa Bay an 11–6 deficit with under five minutes remaining. The Buccaneers managed to drive into St. Louis territory before a late sack made it 2nd and 23 at the 35-yard line. King threw a pass to Bert Emanuel that was thought to be a catch at the 22-yard line before the officials decided to view a replay. They subsequently ruled that the tip of the ball hit the ground and therefore was not a catch despite Emanuel maintaining possession of the ball (in the offseason, the NFL instituted a rule that came to be known as the "Bert Emanuel Rule" in which the ball can touch the ground on a catch as long as the receiver maintains control of the ball through the process). Two plays later, Tampa Bay failed to convert on a fourth and 23 in Rams territory that ended Tampa Bay's season. In total, King went 13-of-29 for 163 yards while throwing two interceptions.

King was tabbed as the starter for the team for 2000, and he would start each game that year. A thrilling rematch against the Rams on Monday Night Football proved to be one of King's most memorable games. Trailing 35–31 with 1:21 remaining, Tampa Bay faced a 4th and 4 at the 29-yard line. King was tripped up but scrambled 6 yards for a first down. Four plays later, Tampa Bay scored the game-winning touchdown, the seventh lead change of the game, and clinched a playoff berth. A win in week 17 would clinch a second consecutive division title and a first-round bye in the playoffs, potentially propelling Tampa Bay to their first Super Bowl appearance. Facing the Green Bay Packers, King did his part leading the offense into position for a game-winning field goal at the end of regulation but Martín Gramática missed the kick in a game that was decided by a field goal that Green Bay made to win 17–14 that dropped Tampa Bay to 10–6 and second place in the Central. The Buccaneers faced the Philadelphia Eagles in the Wild Card round. The Eagles routed the Buccaneers 21–3 in which King went 17-of-31 for 171 yards while being sacked four times and losing a fumble. In total, King threw for 2,769 yards with 18 touchdowns to 13 interceptions with a passer rating of 75.8.

After the disappointing end to the 2000 NFL season, King was replaced by Brad Johnson for 2001 when the Buccaneers elected to sign Johnson in free agency on a five-year contract. King was relegated to a backup role for the following three seasons. In the 2002 season, Brad Johnson was injured and missed a game against the Carolina Panthers. Rob Johnson started at quarterback, but struggled to lead the offense, which managed to tie the game at 9–9 late in the fourth quarter. After a hard hit, Rob Johnson had to sit out a play on the final drive, prompting a cold-off-the-bench Shaun King to run in suddenly and throw an unexpected and decisive first down. A few plays later, Martín Gramática scored the game winning field goal.

A few weeks later, starter Brad Johnson was injured once again, and King was placed as the starter against the Pittsburgh Steelers on Monday Night Football. After some fanfare, King had a dismal first half, falling behind 14–0 after two quick turnovers. King was benched, and Rob Johnson salvaged a 17–7 loss. King would not play another down for the Buccaneers that season, as they advanced to the postseason. He suited up as the #3 quarterback for Tampa Bay's victory in Super Bowl XXXVII but did not play in the game. King returned as the backup quarterback in 2003, but only appeared in three games, starting none. His final game as a Buccaneer was in the final week against the Titans. The Buccaneers, already eliminated from playoff contention, had fallen behind early, and King took over in the second half to wind up the disappointing season.

=== After Tampa Bay ===
In 2004, King signed with the Arizona Cardinals as a free agent, he started only two games and was released at the end of the season. In his first start against the Carolina Panthers he threw for 343 yards which was a season high for the Cardinals.

King signed a free agent contract with the Detroit Lions in spring 2006, but asked to be released after the Lions signed Josh McCown and Jon Kitna. On Friday June 2, 2006, he signed a free agent contract with the Indianapolis Colts, but was then released as a free agent on September 3.

On Friday November 29, 2006, King signed with the Las Vegas Gladiators of the Arena Football League. He threw 10 touchdowns against the Grand Rapids Rampage on March 8, 2007, but was released by the team after a 1–5 start on April 10 of the same year.

On May 30, 2007, King signed with the Hamilton Tiger-Cats of the Canadian Football League. King was released eighteen days later, so he could pursue a career in broadcasting.

== Post-playing ==
The Shaun King Foundation, headquartered in Winter Haven, Florida, is the principal supporter for the Kings Kids program in partnership with Boys & Girls Clubs of the Suncoast, St. Petersburg, Florida

King has worked as an NFL and college football analyst for NBC Sports and Yahoo. In July 2008, King, working as an ESPN analyst, commented that it was "outside of normal" that recently released African-American NFL quarterbacks like Daunte Culpepper, Aaron Brooks, Byron Leftwich and himself were not signed to new teams.

King has 4 children with his former wife Faith King.

In 2016, King joined the coaching staff of the South Florida Bulls a member of the American Athletic Conference. In 2016 as quarterback coach, he helped Quinton Flowers to his best season and AAC player of the year recognition. In 2017, Charlie Strong arrived and King was moved to coach the running backs at USF. where he helped D'Ernest Johnson to his best collegiate season. 247 Sports named King as Recruiter of the Year.

In 2021, King started to work as a host for VSiN, in Las Vegas, Nevada. He co-hosts the show, "The Night Cap," with Tim Murray weeknights from 10 pm to 1 am ET.

King also works as an analyst next to play-by-play man Ben Wilson on the television broadcasts of the Vegas Knight Hawks of the Indoor Football League.

== See also ==
- List of NCAA major college football yearly passing leaders
- List of Arena Football League and National Football League players
