= Maryland Terrapins football statistical leaders =

The Maryland Terrapins football statistical leaders are individual statistical leaders of the Maryland Terrapins football program in various categories, including passing, rushing, receiving, total offense, defensive stats, and kicking. Within those areas, the lists identify single-game, single-season, and career leaders. The Terrapins represent the University of Maryland, College Park in the NCAA's Big Ten Conference.

Although Maryland began competing in intercollegiate football in 1892, the school's official record book has no entries before 1949, as records from before this year are often incomplete and inconsistent.

These lists are dominated by more recent players for several reasons:

- Since the 1950s, seasons have increased from 10 games to 11 and then 12 games in length.
- The NCAA didn't allow freshmen to play varsity football until 1972 (with the exception of the World War II years), allowing players to have four-year careers.
- Bowl games only began counting toward single-season and career statistics in 2002. The Terrapins have played in nine bowl games since this decision, giving players on many recent teams an extra game to accumulate statistics.

These lists are updated through the end of the 2025 season.

== Passing ==
=== Passing yards ===
Career
Rank	Player	Yards	Years
1	Taulia Tagovailoa	11,256	2020 2021 2022 2023
2	Scott Milanovich	7,301	1992 1993 1994 1995
3	Chris Turner	6,543	2007 2008 2009
4	Boomer Esiason	6,259	1981 1982 1983
5	C.J. Brown	5,372	2010 2011 2013 2014
6	Scott McBrien	5,169	2002 2003
7	Sam Hollenbach	5,139	2003 2004 2005 2006
8	Malik Washington	5,029	2025 2026
9	Neil O'Donnell	4,989	1987 1988 1989
10	Dan Henning	4,560	1985 1986 1987

Single season
Rank	Player	Yards	Year
1	Taulia Tagovailoa	3,860	2021
2	Scott Milanovich	3,499	1993
3	John Kaleo	3,392	1992
4	Taulia Tagovailoa	3,377	2023
5	Taulia Tagovailoa	3,008	2022
6	Malik Washington	2,963	2025
7	Billy Edwards	2,881	2024
8	Dan Henning	2,725	1986
9	Scott McBrien	2,672	2003
10	Scott Zolak	2,589	1990

Single game
Rank	Player	Yards	Year	Opponent
1	Scott Milanovich	498	1993	Virginia Tech
2	Malik Washington	459	2025	Michigan State
3	Scott Milanovich	451	1993	West Virginia
4	Taulia Tagovailoa	419	2021	Indiana
5	John Kaleo	418	1992	Clemson
6	Danny O'Brien	417	2010	North Carolina State
7	Scott Milanovich	416	1993	Wake Forest
8	John Kaleo	415	1992	Pittsburgh
9	Scott Milanovich	414	1993	Duke
10	John Kaleo	405	1992	Wake Forest
	Scott Milanovich	405	1993	North Carolina

=== Passing touchdowns ===
Career
Rank	Player	TDs	Years
1	Taulia Tagovailoa	76	2020 2021 2022 2023
2	Scott Milanovich	49	1992 1993 1994 1995
3	Boomer Esiason	42	1981 1982 1983
4	Scott McBrien	34	2002 2003
5	C.J. Brown	33	2010 2011 2013 2014
6	Chris Turner	30	2007 2008 2009
7	Danny O'Brien	29	2010 2011
	Perry Hills	29	2012 2014 2015 2016
9	Sam Hollenbach	28	2003 2004 2005 2006
	Malik Washington	28	2025 2026

Single season
Rank	Player	TDs	Year
1	Scott Milanovich	26	1993
	Taulia Tagovailoa	26	2021
3	Taulia Tagovailoa	25	2023
4	Danny O'Brien	22	2010
5	Scott Milanovich	20	1994
6	Scott McBrien	19	2003
7	Boomer Esiason	18	1982
	Taulia Tagovailoa	18	2022
9	Alan Pastrana	17	1966
	John Kaleo	17	1992
	Malik Washington	17	2025

Single game
Rank	Player	TDs	Year	Opponent
1	John Kaleo	5	1992	Clemson
	Scott Milanovich	5	1993	North Carolina
	Scott Milanovich	5	1993	West Virginia
	Scott Milanovich	5	1993	Wake Forest
	Scott Milanovich	5	1994	North Carolina State
	Taulia Tagovailoa	5	2023	Indiana

== Rushing ==
=== Rushing yards ===
Career
Rank	Player	Yards	Years
1	LaMont Jordan	4,147	1997 1998 1999 2000
2	Charlie Wysocki	3,317	1978 1979 1980 1981
3	Steve Atkins	2,971	1975 1976 1977 1978
4	Ty Johnson	2,635	2015 2016 2017 2018
5	Brandon Ross	2,543	2012 2013 2014 2015
6	Lance Ball	2,487	2004 2005 2006 2007
7	Bruce Perry	2,424	1999 2001 2002 2003
8	Rick Badanjek	2,417	1982 1983 1984 1985
9	Davin Meggett	2,411	2008 2009 2010 2011
10	Da'Rel Scott	2,401	2007 2008 2009 2010

Single season
Rank	Player	Yards	Year
1	LaMont Jordan	1,632	1999
2	Charlie Wysocki	1,359	1980
3	Steve Atkins	1,261	1978
4	Bruce Perry	1,242	2001
5	Chris Downs	1,154	2002
6	Charlie Wysocki	1,140	1979
7	Da'Rel Scott	1,133	2008
8	Willie Joyner	1,039	1982
9	Anthony McFarland	1,034	2018
10	Ty Johnson	1,004	2016

Single game
Rank	Player	Yards	Year	Opponent
1	LaMont Jordan	306	1999	Virginia
2	Anthony McFarland	298	2018	Ohio State
3	Bruce Perry	276	2001	Wake Forest
4	Josh Allen	257	2003	Virginia
5	Brandon Ross	250	2015	Indiana
6	Willie Joyner	240	1982	North Carolina
7	George Scott	237	1977	Villanova
	Bruce Perry	237	2003	Wake Forest
9	LaMont Jordan	227	1999	Duke
10	Charlie Wysocki	222	1979	Louisville

=== Rushing touchdowns ===
Career
Rank	Player	TDs	Years
1	Rick Badanjek	44	1982 1983 1984 1985
2	LaMont Jordan	36	1997 1998 1999 2000
3	Steve Atkins	31	1975 1976 1977 1978
4	Charlie Wysocki	26	1978 1979 1980 1981
	Lance Ball	26	2004 2005 2006 2007
6	Louis Carter	25	1972 1973 1974
	C.J. Brown	25	2010 2011 2013 2014
8	Roman Hemby	22	2021 2022 2023 2024
9	Ed Modzelewski	21	1949 1950 1951
	Josh Allen	21	2002 2003 2005 2006

Single season
Rank	Player	TDs	Year
1	LaMont Jordan	16	1999
2	Bob Shemonski	15	1950
	Rick Badanjek	15	1984
4	Ed Vereb	14	1955
	Louis Carter	14	1973
6	Chris Downs	13	2002
	Keon Lattimore	13	2007
8	Rick Badanjek	12	1985
	Lance Ball	12	2007
	C.J. Brown	12	2013

Single game
Rank	Player	TDs	Year	Opponent
1	Bob Shemonski	5	1950	Virginia Tech
2	Charlie Wysocki	4	1981	Virginia
	LaMont Jordan	4	1999	Clemson
	Chris Downs	4	2002	North Carolina
	Mario Merrills	4	2005	Temple
	D. J. Adams	4	2010	East Carolina

== Receiving ==
=== Receptions ===
Career
Rank	Player	Rec	Years
1	Jermaine Lewis	193	1992 1993 1994 1995
2	Geroy Simon	185	1993 1994 1995 1996
3	Tai Felton	172	2021 2022 2023 2024
4	Torrey Smith	152	2008 2009 2010
5	Jeshaun Jones	151	2018 2020 2021 2022 2023
6	Stefon Diggs	150	2012 2013 2014
7	D. J. Moore	146	2015 2016 2017
8	Darrius Heyward-Bey	138	2006 2007 2008
9	Frank Wycheck	134	1990 1991 1992
10	Levern Jacobs	130	2012 2013 2015 2016

Single season
Rank	Player	Rec	Year
1	Tai Felton	96	2024
2	D. J. Moore	80	2017
3	Geroy Simon	77	1994
4	Marcus Badgett	75	1992
5	Russ Weaver	69	1993
6	Torrey Smith	67	2010
7	Jermaine Lewis	66	1995
8	Stefon Diggs	62	2014
	Rakim Jarrett	62	2021
	Chris Durr	62	2026

Single game
Rank	Player	Rec	Year	Opponent
1	Geroy Simon	16	1995	Florida State
2	Frank Wycheck	14	1990	Virginia Tech
	Russ Weaver	14	1993	Wake Forest
	Torrey Smith	14	2010	North Carolina State
	Tai Felton	14	2024	Villanova
6	Jermaine Lewis	13	1995	Georgia Tech
7	Frank Wycheck	12	1990	North Carolina State
	D. J. Moore	12	2017	Northwestern
	Chig Okonkwo	12	2021	Penn State
	Chris Durr Jr.	12	2026	Virginia Tech

=== Receiving yards ===
Career
Rank	Player	Yards	Years
1	Jermaine Lewis	2,932	1992 1993 1994 1995
2	Stefon Diggs	2,227	2012 2013 2014
3	Torrey Smith	2,215	2008 2009 2010
4	Tai Felton	2,207	2021 2022 2023 2024
5	Darrius Heyward-Bey	2,089	2006 2007 2008
6	Geroy Simon	2,059	1993 1994 1995 1996
7	Jeshaun Jones	2,040	2018 2020 2021 2022 2023
8	D. J. Moore	2,027	2015 2016 2017
9	Dontay Demus	2,008	2018 2019 2020 2021 2022
10	Azizuddin Abdur-Ra'oof	1,895	1984 1985 1986 1987

Single season
Rank	Player	Yards	Year
1	Marcus Badgett	1,240	1992
2	Tai Felton	1,124	2024
3	Torrey Smith	1,055	2010
4	D. J. Moore	1,033	2017
5	Jermaine Lewis	957	1993
6	Jermaine Lewis	937	1995
7	Geroy Simon	891	1994
8	Vernon Davis	871	2005
9	Stefon Diggs	848	2012
10	Rakim Jarrett	829	2021

Single game
Rank	Player	Yards	Year	Opponent
1	Marcus Badgett	251	1992	Pittsburgh
2	Jermaine Lewis	250	1993	North Carolina
3	Torrey Smith	224	2010	North Carolina State
4	James Milling	220	1986	North Carolina
5	Marcus Badgett	218	1992	Duke
6	D. J. Moore	210	2017	Northwestern
7	Jermaine Lewis	205	1995	Duke
8	Jermaine Lewis	189	1995	Georgia Tech
9	Russell Davis	188	1982	Penn State
10	Marcus Badgett	187	1992	Wake Forest

=== Receiving touchdowns ===
Career
Rank	Player	TDs	Years
1	Jermaine Lewis	21	1992 1993 1994 1995
2	Torrey Smith	19	2008 2009 2010
3	Greg Hill	18	1982 1983 1984
4	D. J. Moore	17	2015 2016 2017
	Tai Felton	17	2021 2022 2023 2024
6	Stefon Diggs	14	2012 2013 2014
	Dontay Demus	14	2018 2019 2020 2021 2022
	Jeshaun Jones	14	2018 2020 2021 2022 2023
9	Darrius Heyward-Bey	13	2006 2007 2008
	Guilian Gary	13	1998 1999 2000 2001

Single season
Rank	Player	TDs	Year
1	Torrey Smith	12	2010
2	Marcus Badgett	9	1992
	Jermaine Lewis	9	1994
	Tai Felton	9	2024
5	Dan Bungori	8	1971
	D. J. Moore	8	2017
7	Darryl Hill	7	1963
	Billy Van Heusen	7	1966
	Greg Hill	7	1982
	Greg Hill	7	1983
	Jermaine Lewis	7	1993
	Guilian Gary	7	2000

Single game
Rank	Player	TDs	Year	Opponent
1	Torrey Smith	4	2010	North Carolina State
2	James Milling	3	1986	North Carolina
	Jermaine Lewis	3	1993	West Virginia
	Guilian Gary	3	2000	Georgia Tech
	Vernon Davis	3	2004	Duke
	Tai Felton	3	2023	Indiana

== Total offense ==
Total offense is the sum of passing and rushing statistics. It does not include receiving or returns.

=== Total offense yards ===
Career
Rank	Player	Yards	Years
1	Taulia Tagovailoa	11,459	2020 2021 2022 2023
2	Scott Milanovich	7,111	1992 1993 1994 1995
3	C.J. Brown	7,073	2010 2011 2013 2014
4	Chris Turner	6,385	2007 2008 2009
5	Boomer Esiason	6,081	1981 1982 1983
6	Scott McBrien	5,712	2002 2003
7	Sam Hollenbach	5,114	2003 2004 2005 2006
8	Neil O'Donnell	5,060	1987 1988 1989
9	Perry Hills	4,516	2012 2014 2015 2016
10	Dan Henning	4,463	1985 1986 1987

Single season
Rank	Player	Yards	Year
1	Taulia Tagovailoa	3,937	2021
2	John Kaleo	3,472	1992
3	Scott Milanovich	3,437	1993
4	Taulia Tagovailoa	3,395	2023
5	Malik Washington	3,266	2025
6	Taulia Tagovailoa	3,072	2022
7	Billy Edwards	3,031	2024
8	Scott McBrien	2,931	2003
9	C.J. Brown	2,827	2014
10	C.J. Brown	2,818	2013

=== Total touchdowns ===
Career
Rank	Player	TDs	Years
1	Taulia Tagovailoa	89	2020 2021 2022 2023
2	C.J. Brown	58	2010 2011 2013 2014
3	Scott Milanovich	53	1992 1993 1994 1995
4	Scott McBrien	47	2002 2003
5	Boomer Esiason	44	1981 1982 1983
	Rick Badanjek	44	1982 1983 1984 1985
7	Perry Hills	39	2012 2014 2015 2016
8	LaMont Jordan	38	1997 1998 1999 2000
9	Jack Scarbath	35	1950 1951 1952
10	Chris Turner	33	2007 2008 2009
	Danny O'Brien	33	2010 2011

Single season
Rank	Player	TDs	Year
1	Taulia Tagovailoa	30	2023
2	Scott Milanovich	29	1993
3	Taulia Tagovailoa	28	2021
4	Scott McBrien	25	2003
	C.J. Brown	25	2013
6	Danny O'Brien	24	2010
7	John Kaleo	22	1992
	Taulia Tagovailoa	22	2022
	Scott McBrien	22	2002
10	Alan Pastrana	21	1966
	C.J. Brown	21	2014
	Malik Washington	21	2025

== Defense ==
=== Interceptions ===
Career
Rank	Player	Ints	Years
1	Tom Brown	17	1960 1961 1962
2	Lendell Jones	14	1980 1981 1982 1983
3	Bob Sullivan	13	1962 1963
4	Bernie Faloney	12	1951 1952 1953
	Bob Smith	12	1972 1973 1974
	A.J. Johnson	12	1993 1994 1995 1996
7	Ken Schroy	10	1972 1973 1974
	Lloyd Burruss	10	1976 1977 1978 1980
	Ralph Lary	10	1977 1978 1979 1980
	Howard Eubanks	10	1979 1980 1981 1982
	Lewis Sanders	10	1996 1997 1998 1999
	Curome Cox	10	2002 2003 2004

Single season
Rank	Player	Ints	Year
1	Bob Sullivan	10	1965
2	Tom Brown	8	1961
3	Bob Smith	7	1972
	Ralph Lary	7	1979
	Lendell Jones	7	1982
	Clarence Baldwin	7	1983

Single game
Rank	Player	Ints	Year	Opponent
1	Lendell Jones	4	1982	Duke

=== Tackles ===
Career
Rank	Player	Tackles	Years
1	Eric Wilson	481	1981 1982 1983 1984
2	E.J. Henderson	473	1999 2000 2001 2002
3	Chuck Faucette	466	1983 1984 1985 1986
4	D'Qwell Jackson	447	2002 2003 2004 2005
5	Ratcliff Thomas	424	1993 1994 1995 1996
6	Eric Barton	417	1995 1996 1997 1998
7	Mike Jarmolowich	414	1989 1990 1991 1992
8	Brad Carr	386	1974 1975 1976 1977
9	Scott Saylor	382	1987 1988 1989
10	Alex Wujciak	381	2008 2009 2010

Single season
Rank	Player	Tackles	Year
1	Neal Olkewicz	188	1978
2	Ted Klaube	186	1977
3	Eric Wilson	178	1983
4	E.J. Henderson	175	2002
5	Harry Walters	173	1974
6	Kevin Walker	172	1987
7	Eric Wilson	160	1984
8	Brian Matera	159	1979
	Eric Barton	159	1998
10	Brad Carr	157	1976

=== Sacks ===
Career
Rank	Player	Sacks	Years
1	Andre Monroe	25.0	2011 2012 2013 2014
2	Michael Corvino	24.0	1979 1980 1981 1982
3	Shawne Merriman	22.0	2002 2003 2004
4	Yannick Ngakoue	21.5	2013 2014 2015
5	Charles Johnson	19.0	1976 1977 1978
	Bruce Palmer	19.0	1976 1977 1978
	Mark Duda	19.0	1979 1980 1981 1982
8	Eric Ogbogu	18.5	1994 1995 1996 1997
9	Gurnest Brown	18.0	1979 1980 1981 1982
	Bruce Mesner	18.0	1983 1984 1985 1986
	E.J. Henderson	18.0	1999 2000 2001 2002

Single season
Rank	Player	Sacks	Year
1	Yannick Ngakoue	13.5	2015
2	Bruce Palmer	13.0	1978
	Mark Duda	13.0	1982
4	Randy White	12.0	1974
	Charles Johnson	12.0	1978
	Bruce Mesner	12.0	1985
7	Marlin Van Horn	11.0	1979
	Mike Corvino	11.0	1981
9	Andre Monroe	10.5	2014
10	Gurnest Brown	10.0	1981
	Jack Bradford	10.0	1990
	Kris Jenkins	10.0	2000

== Kicking ==
=== Field goals made ===
Career
Rank	Player	FGs	Years
1	Nick Novak	80	2001 2002 2003 2004
2	Jess Atkinson	60	1981 1982 1983 1984
3	Brad Craddock	57	2012 2013 2014 2015
4	Dan Plocki	47	1985 1986 1987 1988
5	Brian Kopka	42	1997 1998 1999 2000
6	Steve Mike-Mayer	37	1972 1973 1974
	Dan Ennis	37	2003 2004 2005 2006
8	Dan DeArmas	32	1988 1989 1990 1991
	Obi Egekeze	32	2006 2007 2008
10	Joseph Petrino	31	2018 2019 2020 2021

Single season
Rank	Player	FGs	Year
1	Nick Novak	24	2002
	Nick Novak	24	2003
3	Brad Craddock	21	2013
	Sean O'Haire	21	2025
5	Dan Ennis	20	2006
6	Obi Egekeze	19	2007
	Chad Ryland	19	2022
8	Nick Ferrara	18	2009
	Brad Craddock	18	2014
10	Dale Castro	17	1979
	Jess Atkinson	17	1984
	Dan Plocki	17	1988
	Dan Ennis	17	2005

=== Field goal percentage ===
Career
Rank	Player	FG%	Years
1	Sean O'Haire	87.5%	2025
2	Chad Ryland	82.6%	2022
3	Brad Craddock	81.4%	2012 2013 2014 2015
4	Joe O'Donnell	77.8%	1994 1995 1996
5	Nick Novak	74.8%	2001 2002 2003 2004
6	Dan Plocki	74.6%	1985 1986 1987 1988
7	Dan DeArmas	74.4%	1988 1989 1990 1991
8	Dan Ennis	74.0%	2003 2004 2005 2006
9	Jess Atkinson	73.2%	1981 1982 1983 1984
10	Dale Castro	69.2%	1979 1980

Single season
Rank	Player	FG%	Year
1	Brad Craddock	94.7%	2014
2	Sean O'Haire	87.5%	2025
3	Nick Novak	85.7%	2002
	Joseph Petrino	85.7%	2018
5	Jess Atkinson	85.0%	1984
6	Dan Plocki	84.6%	1985
7	Brad Craddock	84.0%	2013
8	Chad Ryland	82.6%	2022
9	Dale Castro	81.0%	1979
10	Dan Ennis	80.0%	2006
