= 2013 Military Bowl =

NCAA football bowl game

2013 Military Bowl presented by Northrop Grumman
- 6th Military Bowl
Marshall Thundering Herd	Maryland Terrapins
(9–4)	(7–5)
C-USA	ACC
31	20
Head coach: John "Doc" Holliday	Head coach: Randy Edsall
	1	2	3	4	Total
Marshall	14	3	0	14	31
Maryland	7	6	0	7	20
- Date: December 27, 2013
- Season: 2013
- Stadium: Navy–Marine Corps Memorial Stadium
- Location: Annapolis, Maryland
- MVP: QB Rakeem Cato (Marshall)
- Favorite: Marshall by 2½
- Referee: Dan Romeo (Mtn. West)
- Attendance: 30,163
- Payout: US$1 million

United States TV coverage
- Network: ESPN
- Announcers: Mike Patrick (play-by-play); Ed Cunningham (analyst); Jeannine Edwards (sidelines)

The 2013 Military Bowl was an American college football bowl game that was played on December 27, 2013, at Navy–Marine Corps Memorial Stadium in Annapolis, Maryland. It was one of the 2013–14 bowl games that concluded the 2013 FBS football season. The sixth edition of the Military Bowl, it featured the Marshall Thundering Herd of Conference USA against the Maryland Terrapins (based in nearby College Park) from the Atlantic Coast Conference. The game began at 2:30 p.m. EST and aired on ESPN. It was sponsored by aerospace and defense technology company Northrop Grumman, and was officially known as the Military Bowl Presented by Northrop Grumman. Marshall defeated Maryland by a score of 31–20.

The Thundering Herd finished the regular season with a 9–4 record (7–1 C-USA), champions of the Conference USA East Division. The Terrapins had a record of 7–5 (3–5 ACC).

This was the first Military Bowl to be played at Navy–Marine Corps Memorial Stadium. The first five were played at RFK Stadium in Washington, D.C.

== Teams ==
The game featured the Marshall Thundering Herd of Conference USA against Maryland Terrapins from the Atlantic Coast Conference. This was the first meeting between Marshall and Maryland.

=== Marshall Thundering Herd ===
The Thundering Herd improved on last season's 5–7 finish, winning the Conference USA East Division Championship and advancing to the 2013 Conference USA Football Championship Game. After their 41–24 defeat at the hands of the Rice Owls, bowl director Steve Beck extended an invitation to the Herd to play in the game.

In addition to being Marshall's first Military Bowl, this is set to be the last Military Bowl to feature representation from Conference USA, as that tie-in will go to the American Athletic Conference from 2014 until at least 2019.

=== Maryland Terrapins ===
The Terrapins got back to their winning ways after finishing 7–5 overall and 3–5 in-conference. They are making their first bowl appearance since they played in the 2010 edition of this game where they faced another Conference USA opponent in East Carolina. At season's end, bowl director Steve Beck extended an invitation to the Terps to play in the game.

This will mark as the Terps' final game as a member of the Atlantic Coast Conference before moving to the Big Ten Conference for 2014.

== Game summary ==
=== First quarter ===
The first quarter started very slow. The first 4 drives all resulted in 3 and outs, but the next 3 resulted in touchdowns. On 2nd and Goal from the Maryland Terrapins 1 yard line, Marshall Thundering Herd quarterback Rakeem Cato threw a touchdown pass to Tommy Shuler. On the next drive, Maryland Terrapins quarterback C. J. Brown threw a touchdown pass to Levern Jacobs. The last scoring play of the first quarter occurred when Cato had another touchdown pass, this time to Gator Hoskins. After the first quarter, the score was 14–7 in favor of Marshall.

=== Second quarter ===
The second quarter started just like how the first quarter ended. Maryland's kicker, Brad Craddock, converted an early field goal from 25 yards. Marshall's next drive would also result in points, as their own kicker, Justin Haig, would make a 27-yard field goal. After the two teams traded punts, Maryland converted another scoring opportunity. Craddock made another field goal, this time from 31 yards away. After the field goal, Marshall had another opportunity to score, but had limited time. With 9 seconds left and facing a 4th down and 10 from the Maryland 33, Marshall coach Doc Holliday decided to go for it. Quarterback Rakeem Cato completed the pass to Essray Taliaferro, but they were not able to score nor were they able to get another play off in time. After the second quarter, the score was 17–13 in favor of Marshall.

=== Scoring summary ===
Scoring summary

Quarter	Time	Drive			Team	Scoring information	Score	
Quarter	Time	Plays	Yards	TOP	Team	Scoring information	Marshall	Maryland
1	6:21	5	37	1:48	MARSH	Tommy Shuler 1-yard touchdown reception from Rakeem Cato, Justin Haig kick good	7	0
1	3:25	7	75	2:56	MD	Levern Jacobs 29-yard touchdown reception from C. J. Brown, Brad Craddock kick good	7	7
1	0:34	7	70	2:51	MARSH	Gator Hoskins 8-yard touchdown reception from Cato, Haig kick good	14	7
2	11:36	10	68	3:58	MD	25-yard field goal by Craddock	14	10
2	9:26	9	64	2:10	MARSH	27-yard field goal by Haig	17	10
2	1:20	9	81	3:50	MD	33-yard field goal by Craddock	17	13
4	14:56	17	99	7:44	MD	Dave Stinebaugh 2-yard touchdown reception from Brown, Craddock kick good	17	20
4	12:05	9	63	2:51	MARSH	Essray Taliaferro 7-yard touchdown run, Haig kick good	24	20
4	3:42	6	50	2:11	MARSH	Hoskins 8-yard touchdown reception from Cato, Haig kick good	31	20
"TOP" = time of possession. For other American football terms, see Glossary of American football.							31	20
