= Taulia Tagovailoa =

American football player (born 2000)

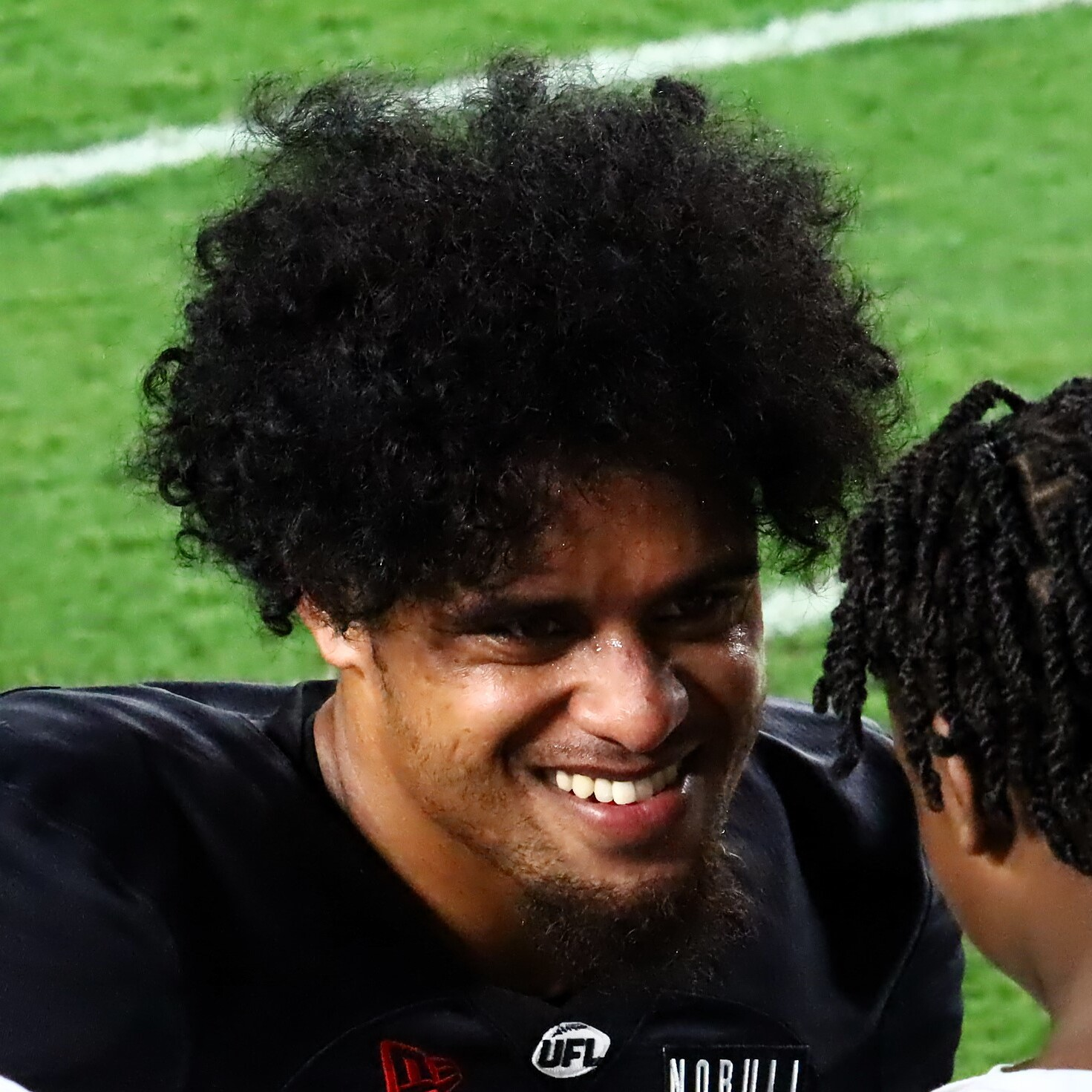
- Tagovailoa with the Houston Gamblers in 2026

Profile
- Position: Quarterback

Personal information
- Born: February 15, 2000 (age 26) ʻEwa Beach, Hawaii, U.S.
- Listed height: 5 ft 11 in (1.80 m)
- Listed weight: 200 lb (91 kg)

Career information
- High school: Thompson (Alabaster, Alabama)
- College: Alabama (2019); Maryland (2020–2023)
- NFL draft: 2024: undrafted

Career history
- Hamilton Tiger-Cats (2024); Hamburg Sea Devils (2025); Massachusetts Pirates (2025); Houston Gamblers (2026)

Awards and highlights
- Polynesian College Football Player of the Year (2023); 2× second-team All-Big Ten (2022, 2023); Pinstripe Bowl MVP (2021); Polynesian High School Football Player of the Year (2018)

Career CFL statistics
- Passing completions: 1
- Passing attempts: 1
- Passing yards: 6
- TD–INT: 0–0
- Rushing touchdowns: 1
- Stats at CFL.ca

Taulia Tagovailoa (born February 15, 2000) (/ˌtʌŋoʊvaɪˈloʊə/ TUNG-oh-vy-LOH-ə) is an American professional football quarterback. He played college football for the Maryland Terrapins and Alabama Crimson Tide. He holds the Big Ten Conference record for most all-time passing yards and holds the Maryland single-season and career school records for both completions and passing yards, as well as a tie for Maryland's single-season touchdowns record. He is the younger brother of Atlanta Falcons quarterback Tua Tagovailoa.

== College career ==
=== Alabama ===
Tagovailoa spent his true freshman season at Alabama in 2019 as a backup to his older brother, Tua Tagovailoa, and Mac Jones. He saw his first collegiate action in the season opener against Duke but did not record any stats. On September 21, 2019, Tagovailoa completed his first career pass for a gain of 20 yards against Southern Miss, finishing 1-for-1 on the day. He entered in the third quarter against the Arkansas Razorbacks on October 26, 2019, for his most extensive action to date, finishing 6-of-8 passing for 45 yards while adding one rush for no gain. He came in late for the Tide against Mississippi State, handing the ball off to run out the clock in Starkville. Tagovailoa finished 2-of-3 for 35 yards against Western Carolina with his first career touchdown. He finished the season 9-of-12 for 100 yards and one touchdown.

=== Maryland ===
==== 2020 season ====
On May 15, 2020, Tagovailoa announced he would be transferring to the University of Maryland.

He started all four games in which he played, only missing the final game vs. Rutgers. In his 4 games, he led Maryland to a 2–2 record, in which he beat Penn State and Minnesota. He broke the 5-game losing streak Maryland had against Penn State. He threw 75-of-122 passing for 1,011 yards, seven touchdowns and seven interceptions. He ranked top five in the Big Ten in multiple passing categories: first in yards per completion (13.48), second in passing efficiency (138.5), second in yards per pass attempt (8.29), third in passing yards per game (252.8) and third in total offense (263.8). At the end of the season, Tagovailoa was named All-Big Ten Honorable Mention.

==== 2021 season ====
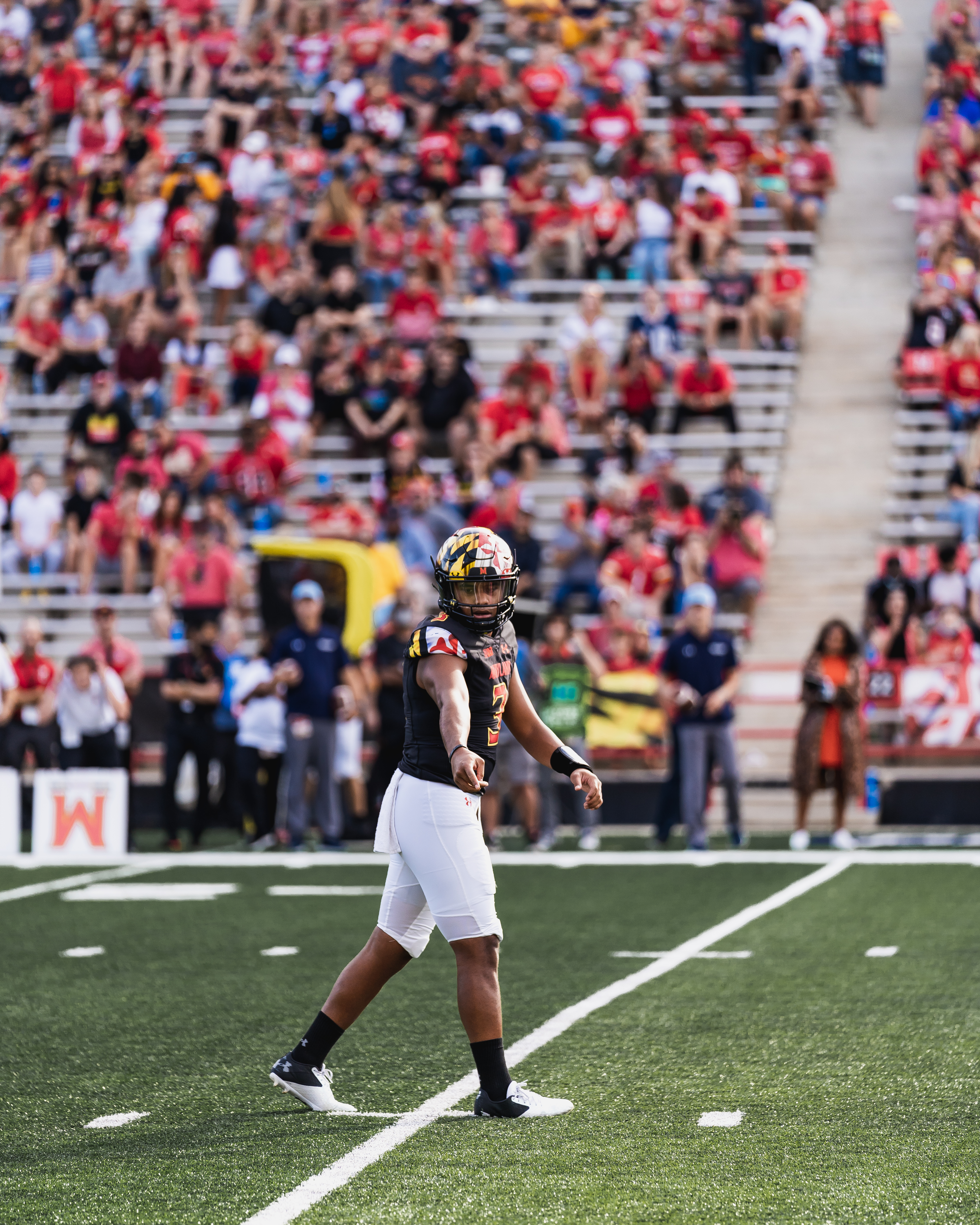
Tagovailoa with Maryland in 2021.

Tagovailoa returned to Maryland as the team's starting quarterback in 2021, starting in all 13 games and again earning All-Big Ten Honorable Mention. He led Maryland to the program's first winning season since 2014 and the program's first bowl bid since 2016, beating West Virginia, Howard, Illinois, Kent State, Indiana, Rutgers, and Virginia Tech. He broke the 1992 single-season completion record set by John Kaleo in a loss against Michigan and then the 1993 single-season passing yards record set by Scott Milanovich in the subsequent win against Rutgers, then tied Milanovich's 1993 single-season touchdowns record in the bowl win. Tagovailoa was named MVP of the 2021 Pinstripe Bowl against Virginia Tech where he went 20-of-24 with 265 passing yards and two touchdowns, along with 42 rushing yards on four carries in their 54-10 win. He led Maryland to the program's first bowl win since 2010.

==== 2022 season ====
Despite missing one game with a knee injury, Tagovailoa passed for 3,008 yards and 18 touchdowns along with eight interceptions in 2022. He set a school record for career passing yards during the season and earned second-team All-Big Ten Conference honors. Despite leading Maryland to an 8–5 record and an appearance in the 2022 Duke's Mayo Bowl, Tagovailoa was benched for the opening drive of the game due to a minor team rule violation. He returned to play the remainder of the game, which the Terrapins won.

==== 2023 season ====
On January 18, 2023, Tagovailoa announced he would forgo entering the NFL draft and return to Maryland to play his senior season. In a week 5 matchup against Indiana, Tagovailoa threw for a career-high 5 touchdown passes with 352 passing yards as well as a rushing touchdown. He was subsequently named Big Ten Offensive Player of the Week. In the season finale, Tagovailoa passed Curtis Painter to become the Big Ten's all–time passing leader with 11,256 passing yards.

=== College statistics ===
Legend
| | Led the Big Ten |
| **Bold** | Career high |

| Year | Team | Games | | | Passing | | | | | | | | Rushing | | | |
| Year | Team | GP | GS | Record | Cmp | Att | Pct | Yds | Avg | TD | Int | Rtg | Att | Yds | Avg | TD |
|---|---|---|---|---|---|---|---|---|---|---|---|---|---|---|---|---|
| 2019 | Alabama | 5 | 0 | — | 9 | 12 | **75.0** | 100 | **8.3** | 1 | 0 | **172.5** | 1 | -2 | -2.0 | 0 |
| 2020 | Maryland | 4 | 4 | 2−2 | 75 | 122 | 61.5 | 1,011 | **8.3** | 7 | 7 | 138.5 | 26 | 44 | **1.7** | 2 |
| 2021 | Maryland | **13** | **13** | 7−6 | **328** | **474** | 69.2 | **3,860** | 8.1 | **26** | **11** | 151.1 | 80 | **81** | 1.0 | 2 |
| 2022 | Maryland | 12 | 11 | 6−5 | 262 | 391 | 67.0 | 3,008 | 7.7 | 18 | 8 | 142.7 | **87** | 64 | 0.7 | 4 |
| 2023 | Maryland | 12 | 12 | **7–5** | 290 | 437 | 66.4 | 3,377 | 7.7 | 25 | **11** | 145.1 | 68 | 18 | 0.3 | **5** |
| Career | | 46 | 40 | 22–18 | 964 | 1,436 | 67.1 | 11,356 | 7.9 | 77 | 37 | 146.1 | 262 | 205 | 0.8 | 13 |

=== Records ===
==== Big Ten records ====
- Most passing yards, career: 11,256
- Highest completion percentage (min. 875 attempts), career: 67.1%

==== Maryland records ====
- Most completions, career: 955
- Most passing attempts, career: 1,424
- Highest completion percentage (min. 200 attempts), career: 67.1%
- Most passing yards, career: 11,256
- Most passing touchdowns, career: 76
- Most interceptions thrown, career: 37
- Highest passer rating (min. 200 attempts), career: 145.9
- Most 300-yard passing games, career: 15
- Most total offensive yards, career: 11,473
- Most touchdowns responsible for, career: 89
- Most completions, season: 328 (2021)
- Most completions, sophomore season: 328 (2021)
- Most completions, junior season: 262 (2022)
- Most passing attempts, sophomore season: 474 (2021)
- Most passing attempts, junior season: 391 (2022)
- Highest completion percentage, season: 69.2% (2021)
- Highest completion percentage, sophomore season: 69.2% (2021)
- Most passing yards, season: 3,860 (2021)
- Most passing yards, sophomore season: 3,860 (2021)
- Most passing yards, junior season: 3,008 (2022)
- Most passing touchdowns, season: 26 (2021)
  - Tied with Scott Milanovich (1993)
- Most passing touchdowns, sophomore season: 26 (2021)
  - Tied with Scott Milanovich (1993)
- Highest passer rating, season: 151.06 (2021)
- Highest passer rating, sophomore season: 151.06 (2021)
- Most 300-yard passing games, season: 7 (2021)
- Most consecutive 300-yard passing games, season: 3 (2021)
- Most total offensive plays, sophomore season: 554 (2021)
- Most total offensive plays, junior season: 469 (2022)
- Most total offensive yards, season: 3,941 (2021)
- Most total offensive yards, sophomore season: 3,941 (2021)
- Most total offensive yards, junior season: 3,069 (2022)
- Most touchdowns responsible for, junior season: 22 (2022)
  - Tied with Scott McBrien (2002)

== Professional career ==
Pre-draft measurables
| Height | Weight | Arm length | Hand span |
|---|---|---|---|
| 5 ft 10 3/4 in (1.80 m) | 185 lb (84 kg) | 30 3/4 in (0.78 m) | 9 5/8 in (0.24 m) |
All values from Pro Day

Tagovailoa went undrafted in the 2024 NFL draft, but was invited to the Seattle Seahawks minicamp for a tryout. The Seahawks did not sign him after camp ended.

=== Hamilton Tiger-Cats ===
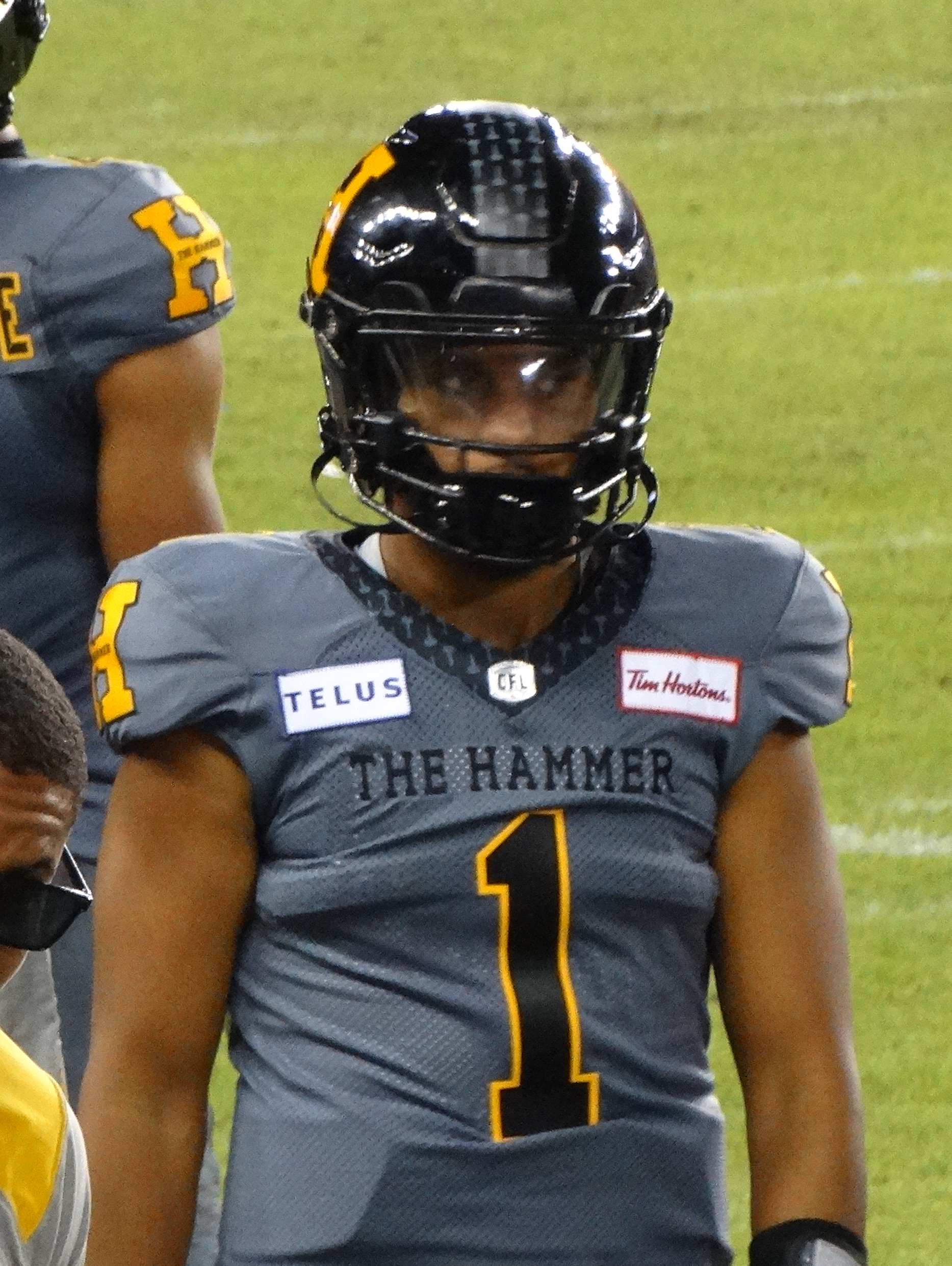
Tagovailoa with the Hamilton Tiger-Cats in 2024

On June 10, 2024, Tagovailoa signed with the Hamilton Tiger-Cats of the Canadian Football League. He spent nine games on the practice roster before making his professional debut on August 23, 2024, against the Winnipeg Blue Bombers, as the third-string quarterback. In the next game, on September 2, 2024, Tagovailoa recorded his first career touchdown on a three-yard rush against the Toronto Argonauts during the annual Labour Day Classic game. He dressed in eight games in 2024 where he completed one pass for six yards and had three carries for 10 yards and one touchdown. In 2025, he was released in first round of cuts at end of rookie camp as main training camp opened on May 11, 2025.

=== Hamburg Sea Devils ===
On May 22, 2025, it was announced that Tagovailoa had signed with the Hamburg Sea Devils. On June 14, Tagovailoa was released by the Sea Devils.

=== Massachusetts Pirates ===
On June 25, 2025, Tagovailoa signed with the Massachusetts Pirates of the Indoor Football League (IFL).

On November 25, 2025, Tagovailoa re-signed with the team, now rebranded as the Orlando Pirates.

=== Houston Gamblers ===
On March 22, 2026, Tagovailoa signed with the Houston Gamblers of the United Football League (UFL). Gamblers head coach, Kevin Sumlin, served as his co-offensive coordinator at Maryland during the 2023 season. Tagovailoa made his UFL debut during the Gamblers' Week 3 matchup against the defending champions DC Defenders, in which he completed 21/40 passes for 171 yards to go along with one touchdown and an interception that was returned for a touchdown as the Gamblers lost 45–7, the worst loss in UFL history. He was released by the Gamblers on May 5.

== Career statistics ==
Legend
| **Bold** | Career high |

=== CFL ===
==== Regular season ====
| Year | Team | Games | | | Passing | | | | | | | | | | Rushing | | | | |
| Year | Team | GP | GS | Record | Cmp | Att | Pct | Yds | Y/A | Y/G | Lng | TD | Int | Rtg | Att | Yds | Avg | Lng | TD |
|---|---|---|---|---|---|---|---|---|---|---|---|---|---|---|---|---|---|---|---|
| 2024 | HAM | 8 | 0 | — | 1 | 1 | 100.0 | 6 | 6.0 | 0.8 | 6 | 0 | 0 | 91.7 | 3 | 10 | 3.3 | 7 | 1 |
| Career | | 8 | 0 | — | 1 | 1 | 100.0 | 6 | 6.0 | 6.0 | 6 | 0 | 0 | 91.7 | 3 | 10 | 3.3 | 7 | 1 |

=== ELF ===
==== Regular season ====
| Year | Team | Games | | | Passing | | | | | | | | | Rushing | | | |
| Year | Team | GP | GS | Record | Cmp | Att | Pct | Yds | Y/A | Y/G | TD | Int | Rtg | Att | Yds | Avg | TD |
|---|---|---|---|---|---|---|---|---|---|---|---|---|---|---|---|---|---|
| 2025 | HAM | 2 | 2 | 1–1 | 20 | 46 | 43.5 | 315 | 6.8 | 157.5 | 3 | 2 | 70.5 | 10 | 46 | 4.6 | 0 |
| Career | | 2 | 2 | 1–1 | 20 | 46 | 43.5 | 315 | 6.8 | 157.5 | 3 | 2 | 70.5 | 10 | 46 | 4.6 | 0 |

=== IFL ===
==== Regular season ====
| Year | Team | Games | | | Passing | | | | | | | | | | Rushing | | | | |
| Year | Team | GP | GS | Record | Cmp | Att | Pct | Yds | Y/A | Y/G | Lng | TD | Int | Rtg | Att | Yds | Avg | Lng | TD |
|---|---|---|---|---|---|---|---|---|---|---|---|---|---|---|---|---|---|---|---|
| 2025 | MASS | 2 | 1 | 0–1 | 8 | 20 | 40.0 | 55 | 2.8 | 27.5 | 17 | 1 | 3 | 49.6 | 10 | 68 | 6.8 | 19 | 2 |
| Career | | 2 | 1 | 0–1 | 8 | 20 | 40.0 | 55 | 2.8 | 27.5 | 17 | 1 | 3 | 49.6 | 10 | 68 | 6.8 | 19 | 2 |

=== UFL ===
==== Regular season ====
| Year | Team | Games | | | Passing | | | | | | | | | | Rushing | | | | |
| Year | Team | GP | GS | Record | Cmp | Att | Pct | Yds | Y/A | Y/G | Lng | TD | Int | Rtg | Att | Yds | Avg | Lng | TD |
|---|---|---|---|---|---|---|---|---|---|---|---|---|---|---|---|---|---|---|---|
| 2026 | HOU | 4 | 1 | 0–1 | 34 | 64 | 53.1 | 300 | 4.7 | 75.0 | 23 | 2 | 1 | 69.8 | 8 | 43 | 5.4 | 14 | 1 |
| Career | | 4 | 1 | 0–1 | 34 | 64 | 53.1 | 300 | 4.7 | 75.0 | 23 | 2 | 1 | 69.8 | 8 | 43 | 5.4 | 14 | 1 |

== Flag Football ==
In 2026 he led the American Samoan Flag Football team to a victory over the United States at the IFAF Men's Flag Football World Championship. It was their first loss since 2012.
