= Perry Hills =

American football quarterback (born 1993)

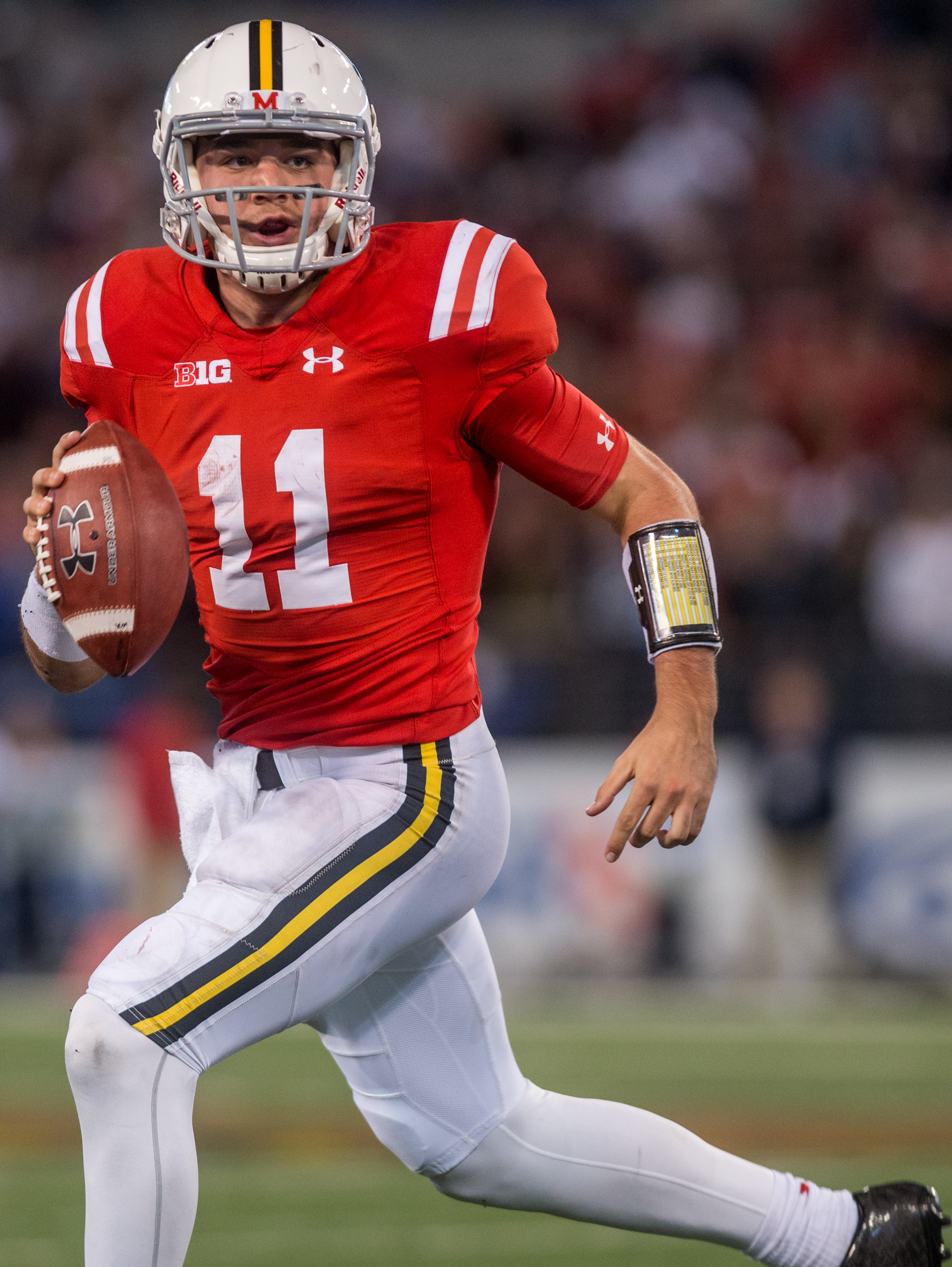

No. 11
- Position: Quarterback

Personal information
- Born: April 21, 1993 (age 33); Pittsburgh, Pennsylvania, U.S.
- Listed height: 6 ft 2 in (1.88 m)
- Listed weight: 213 lb (97 kg)

Career information
- High school: Central Catholic (Pittsburgh)
- College: Maryland
- NFL draft: 2017: undrafted

Awards and highlights
- School single-game rushing record by a quarterback (2015); Academic All-Big Ten (2015); ACC Rookie of the Week (2012)

Perry Hills (born April 21, 1993) is an American former college football player who was a quarterback for the Maryland Terrapins. He was their starting quarterback for most of the 2012, 2015, and 2016 seasons. In 2015, Hills broke the school's single-game rushing record for a quarterback with 170 yards against No. 1 Ohio State.

== Early life ==
Born in Pittsburgh, Pennsylvania, Perry Hills attended Central Catholic High School, where he starred both on the gridiron and the wrestling mat. As a senior, Hills threw for over 2,000 yards, with 13 touchdowns to only 2 interceptions. Hills was also recognized as an all-state wrestler, winning the state title in his weight class.

== College career ==
=== Statistics ===
Year	Team	Games			Passing								Rushing			
Year	Team	GP	GS	Record	Cmp	Att	Pct	Yds	Avg	TD	INT	Rtg	Att	Yds	Avg	TD
2012	Maryland	7	7	4–3	97	169	57.4	1,336	7.9	8	7	131.1	70	−14	-0.2	3
2013	Maryland	Redshirt														
2014	Maryland	2	0	—	5	10	50.0	86	8.6	1	0	155.2	3	15	5.0	0
2015	Maryland	9	8	2–6	90	180	50.0	1,001	5.6	8	13	96.9	109	535	4.9	3
2016	Maryland	11	11	6–5	122	197	61.9	1,464	7.4	12	4	140.4	91	93	1.0	4
Career		29	26	12–14	314	556	56.6	3,887	7.0	29	24	123.8	273	629	2.3	10
