= Charlie Wysocki =

American football player

Profile
- Position: Running back

Personal information
- Born: c. 1960; Wilkes-Barre, Pennsylvania, U.S.

Career information
- High school: Meyers (Wilkes-Barre, PA)
- College: Maryland (1978–1981)

Charlie Wysocki (born c. 1960), born Charles DeGraffenreid, is a former American football running back. He played college football for the Maryland Terrapins football team from 1978 to 1981.

Wysocki was born as the 13th of 14 children in a poor family in Wilkes-Barre, Pennsylvania. As a boy, he was adopted by Stan and Pat Wysocki, a white couple. He attended Meyers High School in Wilkes-Barre where he broke school records for yardage and scoring.

At the University of Maryland, he had consecutive seasons with over 1,000 rushing yards, tallying 1,140 yards in 1979 and 1,359 yards in 1980. His 1980 yardage ranked fifth nationally among major-college football players. Over his four years at Maryland, he tallied 17 100-yard and three 200-yard rushing games, 3,317 total rushing yards, and 26 touchdowns. He received first-team All-America honors in 1979 and 1980 and was inducted in 2014 into the University of Maryland Athletics Hall of Fame.

Wysocki attended training camp with the Dallas Cowboys for one week, but undiagnosed bipolar disorder resulted in his hospitalization in the Clarks Summit State Hospital. He later became an advocate, author and public speaker on mental health issues.

== See also ==
- Maryland Terrapins football statistical leaders#Rushing
