= Dale Castro =

American football player and coach (born 1959)

Dale Castro (born November 26, 1959) is a former American college and professional football player and coach. He played college football for the University of Maryland as a record-setting placekicker and All-American. Castro had a brief professional career in the Arena Football League, and then spent two decades coaching high school football.

== Early life and college ==
Castro was born in 1959 and grew up in Shady Side, Maryland. He attended the University of Maryland with the intention of earning a scholarship as a baseball pitcher, but contracted mononucleosis during his first semester which caused him to miss the try-outs. After he recuperated, Castro decided to try out for the football team as a walk-on placekicker, a position he had played in high school. During his sophomore year, he was offered a scholarship. He joined another Maryland walk-on that season who gained national recognition, Charlie Wysocki, who was the nation's rushing leader in 1979.

In 1979, Castro tied the NCAA record for most field goals in a half, with four against Mississippi State. In the fourth quarter of that game, he made a fifth field goal. He set a then-NCAA record when he made his first 16 field goal attempts. In total, he made 17 field goals during the season. Castro was named a consensus first-team All-American by the NCAA selectors: the Walter Camp Football Foundation, United Press International, Football Writers Association of America, and The Sporting News. He concluded his collegiate career in 1980, and as the end of 2008 season, he remains the school's fourth-ranked player in career punting yards (8,584), seventh-ranked in field goal percentage (69.2%), and tenth-ranked in career field goals (27).

== Professional career ==
Drafted and then cut by the Dallas Cowboys after the 1981 pre-season, Castro had a tryout with the Seattle Seahawks in 1982. In 1983, he played for the Washington Federals in the United States Football League. He recorded three field goals on six attempts and two extra points on three attempts. He also played one season in the Arena Football League for the Washington Commandos in 1987. That season, he made 12 field goals on 21 attempts and 16 extra points on 31 attempts and was named Second Team All-Arena.

From 1981 to 1986, he served as an assistant coach at Southern High School in Anne Arundel County, Maryland. From 1987 to 1989, he was the offensive coordinator for DuVal High School in Prince George's County, Maryland. In 1990, Castro was hired as an assistant coach at High Point High School. He served as High Point's head football coach for the next 12 years, and also as its baseball coach. He resigned in 2001 in order to take some time off from coaching, but remained at his position in the school's guidance department.

In 2003, Castro left High Point to become the head football coach at Annapolis High School. He resigned after one season when he could not secure a full-time position as a guidance counselor at the school. Castro said, "I think the Annapolis High football program needs a coach who works in the building. The kids deserve a full-time coach." In 2009, he was inducted into the University of Maryland Athletic Hall of Fame. In 1997, he was inducted into the Anne Arundel County Sports Hall of Fame.
