= C. J. Brown (American football) =

American football player (born 1991)

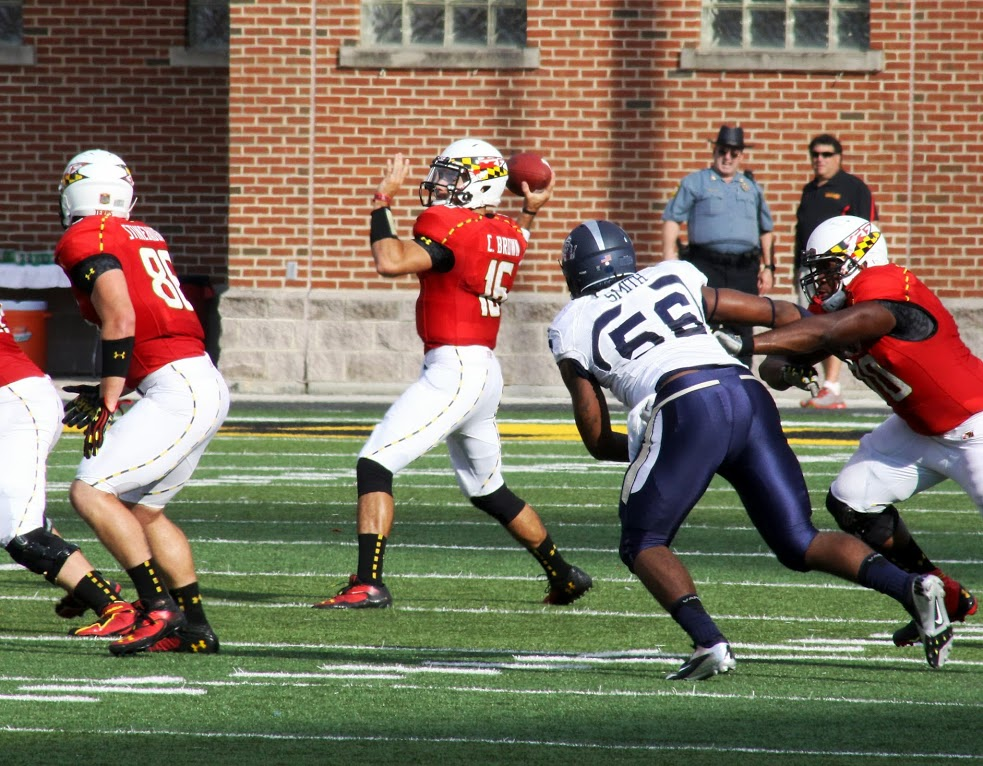
- Brown passes during Maryland's win over Old Dominion in September 2013

No. 16
- Position: Quarterback

Personal information
- Born: June 27, 1991 (age 35); Troy, Michigan, U.S.
- Listed height: 6 ft 3 in (1.91 m)
- Listed weight: 210 lb (95 kg)

Career information
- High school: Seneca Valley S.H.S.
- College: Maryland (2009–2014)
- Stats at ESPN

Clark "C. J." David Brown Jr. (born June 27, 1991) is an American former football quarterback. He played college football for the Maryland Terrapins as their starting quarterback in 2011, 2013 and 2014. In 2011, Brown broke the school's 61-year-old single-game rushing record for a quarterback with 162 yards against No. 8 Clemson.

== Early life ==
Brown was born on June 27, 1991 in Troy, Michigan to Clark and Kimberley Brown, Sr., the eldest of their three children. His father attended Michigan State University, where he played as a quarterback on the football team. The family later relocated to Cranberry Township, Pennsylvania, and Brown attended Seneca Valley Senior High School.

At Seneca Valley, Brown earned three letters on both the basketball and football teams. He said that basketball was his preferred sport, but felt that he had a brighter future on the gridiron. As a junior, he averaged 12.0 points per game in basketball, and according to the Pittsburgh Post-Gazette was athletic enough to execute a 360-degree dunk. Brown served two seasons as the football team captain, and ran Seneca Valley's spread offense. Brown set the school records with 3,845 passing yards and 26 touchdowns over the course of his interscholastic career, and also set the school single-season for passing yards in his senior season.

As a freshman, he played quarterback for the first time, and showed early promise before suffering a broken collarbone. As a sophomore in 2006, Brown rushed for 586 yards and five touchdowns. He was named an honorable mention All-Northern Six Conference player. As a junior in 2007, he passed for 1,567 yards and 11 ;touchdowns, and was the team's second leading rusher with 443 yards and five touchdowns. The Pittsburgh Post-Gazette named him to its "Fab 22". As a senior in 2008, he passed for 2,154 yards and 14 touchdowns and rushed for 680 yards and 12 touchdowns. The Pittsburgh Post-Gazette again selected him for its "Fab 22", and the Pittsburgh Tribune-Review named him to its "Fantastic 25". Brown twice selected unanimously as an All-Northern Six Conference player.

Rivals.com rated Brown a three-star prospect, and ranked him as the 17th-best dual-threat quarterback in the nation and 14th-best prospect in the state of Pennsylvania. Scout.com also rated him a three-star prospect, and ranked him the 67th best quarterback prospect in his class. Brown received scholarship offers from Maryland and Akron. Indiana, Michigan State, Northwestern, Penn State, Pittsburgh, Virginia, and West Virginia also showed interest in Brown. After Brown verbally committed to Maryland in April 2008, the Pittsburgh and Penn State coaching staffs said they would be interested if he reopened his recruitment.

== College career ==
Brown enrolled at the University of Maryland, College Park, and served a redshirt season in 2009. In 2010, he saw action in four plays against Morgan State. On his first snap, he gained 12 yards on an option run, and lowered his shoulder into two opposing tacklers. He suffered a broken collarbone on the run, but remained in the game for three more plays. The injury ended his season. During his convalescence, head coach Ralph Friedgen said, "I just told him he has to hang in there, he has to sit in the meetings and learn as much as you can. That's an area where he was coming on. I still think he's got the potential to be a very, very good quarterback. He's very mobile and he has a strong arm and [he is] a smart guy. He's just further behind because of his high school development." During the season, fellow redshirt sophomore Danny O'Brien captured the starting position and finished with ACC Rookie of the Year honors. Friedgen was fired after the season and replaced by Connecticut head coach Randy Edsall, who selected Gary Crowton as offensive coordinator and quarterbacks coach.

During the spring, Edsall said "C. J. Brown is putting pressure on Danny [O'Brien]. C.J. Brown is playing very well. I think we're in a good situation." O'Brien entered the 2011 season as the established starter at quarterback, but the staff hoped to use Brown because of his mobility and athleticism. Brown recorded a 4.42-second 40-yard dash. Wide receiver Kevin Dorsey said, "You watched today and you watched him outrunning linebackers. Before today, he outran a safety, which seems crazy. Crazy athletic. Both [quarterbacks] are definitely going to play." Against No. 12 Georgia Tech, O'Brien struggled, completing one pass on six attempts and throwing an interception. Brown came off the bench to relieve O'Brien, and while he also struggled passing, going 4-for-17 for 36 yards and an interception, he rushed for 124 yards, including a 77-yard touchdown off of a zone-option read. After the game, he said, "I know the passing game in and out, just like I'm supposed to ... It might not have showed today, but I knew I was making the correct reads. Maybe the balls weren't there on time, and I was a little off ... I'll get better week to week." Maryland head coach Randy Edsall stated the starting quarterback for the following week's game against No. 8 Clemson would be a game-time decision. Brown started against Clemson, and played the duration of the 56–45 loss. He recorded 17 completions on 35 attempts for 177 yards, three touchdowns, and an interception. He also rushed for a touchdown. Brown carried the ball 22 times for 162 yards, which set the single-game rushing yards record for a Maryland quarterback. The record was previously held by Jack Scarbath, who rushed for 132 yards against Georgetown in 1950.

Brown missed the 2012 season with an ACL injury. He returned to be the starting quarterback in the 2013 season. For the season he passed for 2,242 yards with 13 passing touchdowns and rushed for 576 yards with 12 rushing touchdowns. Brown remained the starter his senior season in 2014, passing for 2,288 yards and 13 touchdowns.

=== Statistics ===
Through the end of the 2014 regular season, Brown's statistics are as follows:

| Year | Team | Games | Games started | Record | Passing | | | | | | | Rushing | | | |
| Year | Team | Games | Games started | Record | Comp | Att | Yards | Pct. | TD | Int | QB rating | Att | Yards | Avg | TD |
|---|---|---|---|---|---|---|---|---|---|---|---|---|---|---|---|
| 2009 | Maryland | Redshirt | | | | | | | | | | | | | |
| 2010 | Maryland | 1 | 0 | 0–0 | 0 | 1 | 0 | 0.0 | 0 | 0 | 0.0 | 1 | 12 | 12.0 | 0 |
| 2011 | Maryland | 10 | 5 | 0–5 | 82 | 166 | 842 | 49.4 | 7 | 6 | 98.7 | 79 | 574 | 7.3 | 5 |
| 2012 | Maryland | Redshirt | | | | | | | | | | | | | |
| 2013 | Maryland | 11 | 11 | 6–5 | 166 | 282 | 2,242 | 58.9 | 13 | 7 | 135.9 | 140 | 576 | 4.1 | 12 |
| 2014 | Maryland | 12 | 12 | 7–5 | 174 | 327 | 2,083 | 53.2 | 13 | 9 | 114.3 | 148 | 569 | 3.8 | 7 |
| Totals | | 33 | 33 | 13–15 | 422 | 776 | 5,167 | 54.4 | 33 | 22 | 118.7 | 368 | 1,731 | 4.7 | 24 |
