= Tai Felton =

American football player (born 2003)

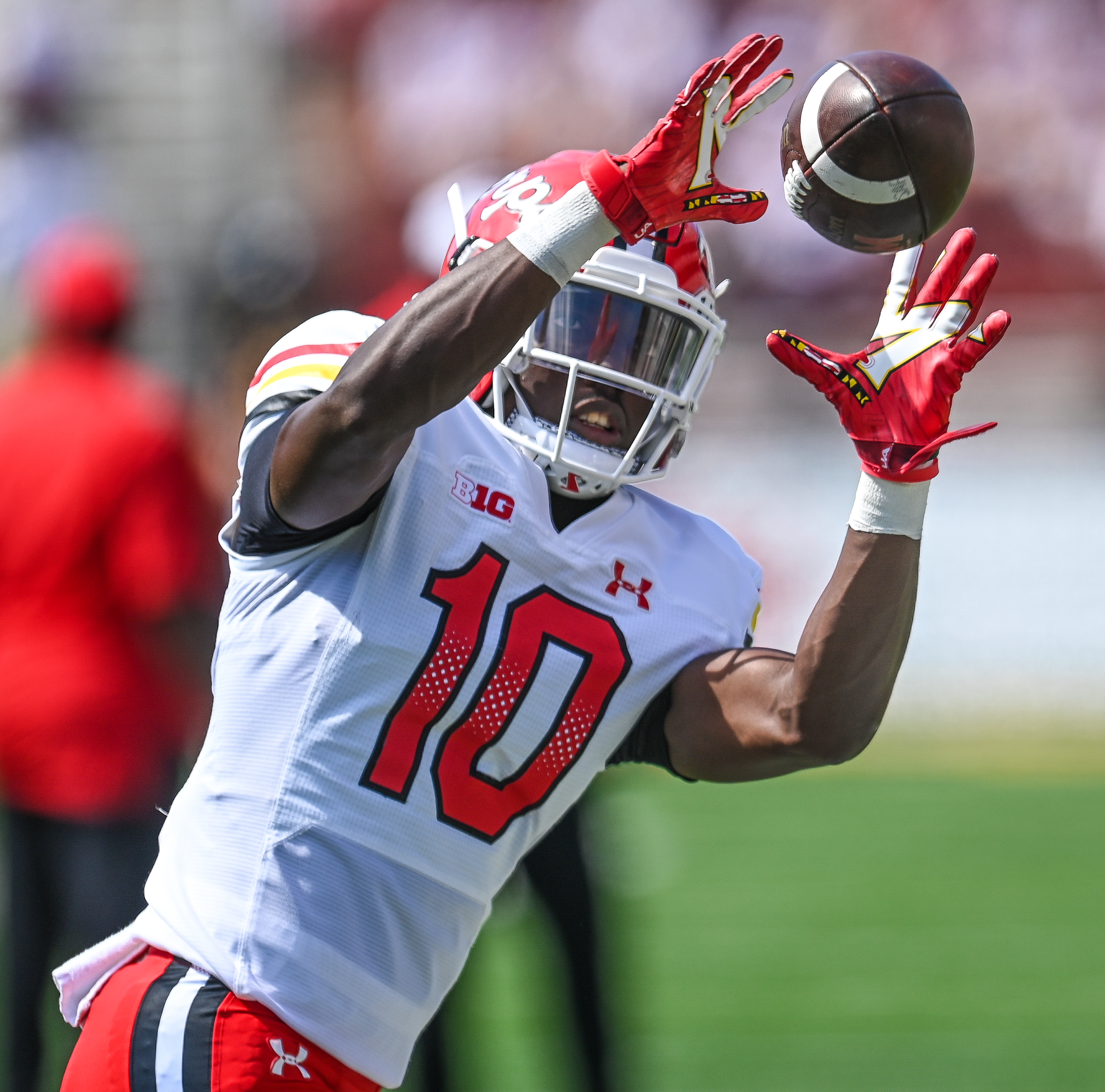
- Felton with the Maryland Terrapins in 2021

No. 13 – Minnesota Vikings
- Position: Wide receiver
- Roster status: Active

Personal information
- Born: March 15, 2003 (age 23); Ashburn, Virginia, U.S.
- Listed height: 6 ft 1 in (1.85 m)
- Listed weight: 186 lb (84 kg)

Career information
- High school: Stone Bridge (Ashburn)
- College: Maryland (2021–2024)
- NFL draft: 2025: 3rd round, 102nd overall pick

Career history
- Minnesota Vikings (2025–present)

Awards and highlights
- First-team All-Big Ten (2024); Third-team All-Big Ten (2023)

Career NFL statistics as of Week 10, 2026
- Receptions: 9
- Receiving yards: 99
- Return yards: 178
- Stats at Pro Football Reference

Tai'shar Felton (born March 15, 2003) is an American professional football wide receiver and kickoff returner for the Minnesota Vikings of the National Football League (NFL). He played college football for the Maryland Terrapins and was selected by the Vikings in the third round of the 2025 NFL draft.

== Early life ==
Felton was born on March 15, 2003, in Ashburn, Virginia. He was a three-star rated recruit at Stone Bridge High School and originally committed to play college football for the Hokies at Virginia Tech before suffering an ACL injury as a senior and re-committing to play for the Terrapins at the University of Maryland.

== College career ==
During Felton's freshman season in 2021, he played in eight games as a wide receiver, finishing the season with five total receptions for 51 yards. During the 2022 season, he played in all 13 games and started six of them at wide receiver, finishing the season with 23 receptions for 309 yards and two touchdowns.

During the 2023 season, he played in and started all 13 games at wide receiver, finishing the season with 48 receptions for 723 yards and six touchdowns, along with a rushing attempt for 16 yards. Felton earned first-team All-Big Ten and third-team All-American honors for the 2024 season after catching 96 passes, a single-season school record, for 1,124 yards and 9 touchdowns.

== Professional career ==
Pre-draft measurables
Height	Weight	Arm length	Hand span	Wingspan	40-yard dash	10-yard split	20-yard split	20-yard shuttle	Vertical jump	Broad jump	Bench press
6 ft 1 1/8 in (1.86 m)	183 lb (83 kg)	30 in (0.76 m)	9 in (0.23 m)	6 ft 0 3/8 in (1.84 m)	4.37 s	1.51 s	2.56 s	4.27 s	39.5 in (1.00 m)	10 ft 10 in (3.30 m)	12 reps
All values from NFL Combine/Pro Day

Felton was selected by the Minnesota Vikings with the 102nd pick in the third round of the 2025 NFL draft.
