= 2013 Maryland Terrapins football team =

American college football season

2013 Maryland Terrapins football

Military Bowl, L 20–31 vs. Marshall
- Conference: Atlantic Coast Conference
- Atlantic Division
- Record: 7–6 (3–5 ACC)
- Head coach: Randy Edsall (3rd season)
- Offensive coordinator: Mike Locksley (2nd season)
- Offensive scheme: Multiple
- Defensive coordinator: Brian Stewart (2nd season)
- Base defense: 3–4
- Home stadium: Byrd Stadium

2013 Atlantic Coast Conference football standings
	Conf.			Overall
Team	W		L	W		L
Atlantic Division
No. 1 Florida State x$#	8	–	0	14	–	0
No. 8 Clemson %	7	–	1	11	–	2
Boston College	4	–	4	7	–	6
Syracuse	4	–	4	7	–	6
Maryland	3	–	5	7	–	6
Wake Forest	2	–	6	4	–	8
NC State	0	–	8	3	–	9
Coastal Division
No. 23 Duke x	6	–	2	10	–	4
Miami (FL)	5	–	3	9	–	4
Virginia Tech	5	–	3	8	–	5
Georgia Tech	5	–	3	7	–	6
North Carolina	4	–	4	7	–	6
Pittsburgh	3	–	5	7	–	6
Virginia	0	–	8	2	–	10
Championship: Florida State 45, Duke 7
# – BCS National Champion; $ – BCS representative as conference champion; % – BCS at-large representative; x – Division champion/co-champions; Rankings from AP Poll

The 2013 Maryland Terrapins football team represented the University of Maryland, College Park in the 2013 NCAA Division I FBS football season. The Terrapins were led by third-year head coach Randy Edsall and play their home games at Byrd Stadium. This marked the Terrapins' 61st and final season as a member of the Atlantic Coast Conference (ACC) and their ninth season in the ACC's Atlantic Division. They finished the season 7–6 overall and 3–5 in ACC play to place fifth in the Atlantic Division. They were invited to the Military Bowl, where they lost to Marshall.

== Before the season ==
On June 25, 2013 top ranked recruit and high school All-American, Derwin Gray, was declared academically ineligible for the 2013 season and will not enroll in school. He is planning to explore options with prep schools and junior colleges and eventually return to Maryland.

On August 3, 2013 sophomore running back Wes Brown was suspended for one year. He will miss the entire 2013 season but he may be reinstated in time to join spring practices in 2014 should he comply with certain guidelines. The suspension was handed out in conjunction with a series of offseason transgressions to include being a suspect in a shooting in Baltimore.

== Schedule ==
Date	Time	Opponent	Rank	Site	TV	Result	Attendance
August 31	12:30 pm	FIU*		Byrd Stadium; College Park, MD	ACCRSN	W 43–10	36,321
September 7	4:00 pm	Old Dominion*		Byrd Stadium; College Park, MD	ESPNews	W 47–10	38,377
September 14	7:30 pm	at UConn*		Rentschler Field; East Hartford, CT	ESPN3	W 32–21	38,916
September 21	3:30 pm	vs. West Virginia*		M&T Bank Stadium; Baltimore, MD (rivalry)	ESPNU	W 37–0	55,677
October 5	12:00 pm	at No. 8 Florida State	No. 25	Doak Campbell Stadium; Tallahassee, FL	ESPN	L 0–63	74,909
October 12	3:30 pm	Virginia		Byrd Stadium; College Park, MD (rivalry)	ESPNU	W 27–26	41,077
October 19	3:30 pm	at Wake Forest		BB&T Field; Winston-Salem, NC	ESPNU	L 10–34	27,807
October 26	3:30 pm	No. 9 Clemson		Byrd Stadium; College Park, MD	ESPN	L 27–40	48,134
November 9	3:30 pm	Syracuse		Byrd Stadium; College Park, MD	ACCRSN	L 3–20	37,213
November 16	12:30 pm	at Virginia Tech		Lane Stadium; Blacksburg, VA	ACCN	W 27–24 ^{OT}	64,686
November 23	3:30 pm	Boston College		Byrd Stadium; College Park, MD	ACCRSN	L 26–29	32,147
November 30	12:30 pm	at NC State		Carter–Finley Stadium; Raleigh, NC	ACCN	W 41–21	43,023
December 27	2:30 pm	vs. Marshall*		Navy–Marine Corps Memorial Stadium; Annapolis, MD (Military Bowl)	ESPN	L 20–31	30,163
*Non-conference game; Rankings from AP Poll released prior to the game; All times are in Eastern time

== Rankings ==
Ranking movements Legend: ██ Increase in ranking ██ Decrease in ranking — = Not ranked RV = Received votes
	Week																
Poll	Pre	1	2	3	4	5	6	7	8	9	10	11	12	13	14	15	Final
AP	—	—	—	—	RV	25	—	—	—	—	—	—	—	—	—	—	—
Coaches	—	—	—	—	RV	—	—	—	—	—	—	—	—	—	—	—	—
Harris	Not released							—	—	—	—	—	—	—	—	—	Not released
BCS	Not released								—	—	—	—	—	—	—	—	Not released

== Game summaries ==
Games are broadcast on radio stations that are part of the Terrapin Sports Radio Network. Long-time broadcaster Johnny Holliday covers play-by-play, Tim Strachan provides color commentary, and former Terrapin quarterback Scott McBrien is the sideline reporter.

=== Florida International ===
FIU vs. Maryland

Team	1	2	3	4	Total
Panthers	3	7	0	0	10
• Terrapins	13	27	0	3	43

- Date: August 31, 2013
- Location: Byrd Stadium • College Park, Maryland
- Game start: 12:30 p.m.
- Elapsed time: 3:10
- Game attendance: 36,321
- Game weather: Sunny, 87 °F (31 °C), Wind 6 mph (9.7 km/h) SSE
- Referee: Ken Antee
- TV announcers (RSN): Wes Durham (play-by-play), Brian Stann (color), Jenn Hildreth (sidelines)

Scoring summary
1	11:48	MD	Brad Craddock 20-yard field goal	MD 3–0
1	10:15	MD	Brad Craddock 25-yard field goal	MD 6–0
1	7:33	FIU	Sergio Sroka 32-yard field goal	MD 6–3
1	5:50	MD	C.J. Brown 29-yard run (Brad Craddock kick)	MD 13–3
2	14:54	MD	Deon Long 25-yard pass from C.J. Brown (Brad Craddock kick)	MD 20–3
2	8:30	FIU	L. Caldwell 1-yard run (Sergio Sroka kick)	MD 20–10
2	7:46	MD	Kenneth Goins 17-yard pass from C.J. Brown (Brad Craddock kick failed)	MD 26–10
2	5:58	MD	Stefon Diggs 66-yard pass from C.J. Brown (Brad Craddock kick)	MD 33–10
2	1:16	MD	C.J. Brown 11-yard run (Brad Craddock kick)	MD 40–10
4	12:40	MD	Brad Craddock 23-yard field goal	MD 43–10

Maryland began its season at home taking on the FIU Panthers. Prior to this game, Maryland had won all of the previous three meetings between the two schools. The fourth meeting would have the same result.

C.J. Brown returned to quarterback the Terps for his first game since 2011, having missed all of 2012 with an ACL injury. He dominated against FIU, completing 20 of 23 passes, passing for 281 yards and 3 touchdowns, and rushing for 105 yards and two touchdowns. 98 of those passing yards went to sophomore Stefon Diggs, whose day included a 66-yard touchdown reception. Junior college transfer Deon Long made also his presence known with 110 receiving yards and a touchdown.

While C.J. Brown was the leading rusher, other players also contributed to the ground game. Running backs Albert Reid, Brandon Ross and Jaquille Veii had at least 8 carries each, and their contributions helped the Terps amass 251 yards on the ground. Kicker Brad Craddock connected on three field goals and was 4 for 5 on PAT attempts. The Maryland defense combined for five sacks and limited FIU to just ten points, all in the first half.

FIU quarterbacks Jack Medlock and E.J. Hilliard were able to combine for only 80 yards and no touchdowns, completing 10 of 22 pass attempts. The Panthers were able to score a touchdown with 8:30 left in the 2nd quarter and pull within 10 points, but Maryland responded and scored three more touchdowns before halftime to secure a 40–10 lead at the break. Craddock would add his third field goal early in the 4th quarter for the final margin of victory.

=== Old Dominion ===
Old Dominion vs. Maryland

Team	1	2	3	4	Total
Monarchs	3	0	0	7	10
• Terrapins	17	14	14	2	47

- Date: September 7, 2013
- Location: Byrd Stadium • College Park, Maryland
- Game start: 4:06 p.m.
- Elapsed time: 3:08
- Game attendance: 38,377
- Game weather: Sunny, 81 °F (27 °C), Wind 7 mph (11 km/h) SE
- Referee: Pat Garvey
- TV announcers (ESPNews): Beth Mowins (play-by-play), Joey Galloway (color), Paul Carcaterra (sideline)

Scoring summary
1	11:14	MD	Brad Craddock 32-yard field goal	MD 3–0
1	7:55	ODU	J. Brown 35-yard field goal	tied 3–3
1	5:18	MD	Brandon Ross 5-yard run (Brad Craddock kick)	MD 10–3
1	2:58	MD	C.J. Brown 5-yard run (Brad Craddock kick)	MD 17–3
2	5:19	MD	Stefon Diggs 41-yard pass from C.J. Brown (Brad Craddock kick)	MD 24–3
2	1:33	MD	Albert Ried 27-yard run (Brad Craddock kick)	MD 31–3
3	6:56	MD	C.J. Brown 31-yard run (Brad Craddock kick)	MD 38–3
3	0:15	MD	Nigel King 4-yard pass from C.J. Brown (Brad Craddock kick)	MD 45–3
4	12:09	MD	Darius Kilgo safety	MD 47–3
4	5:05	ODU	C. Boyd 3-yard run (J. Brown kick)	MD 47–10

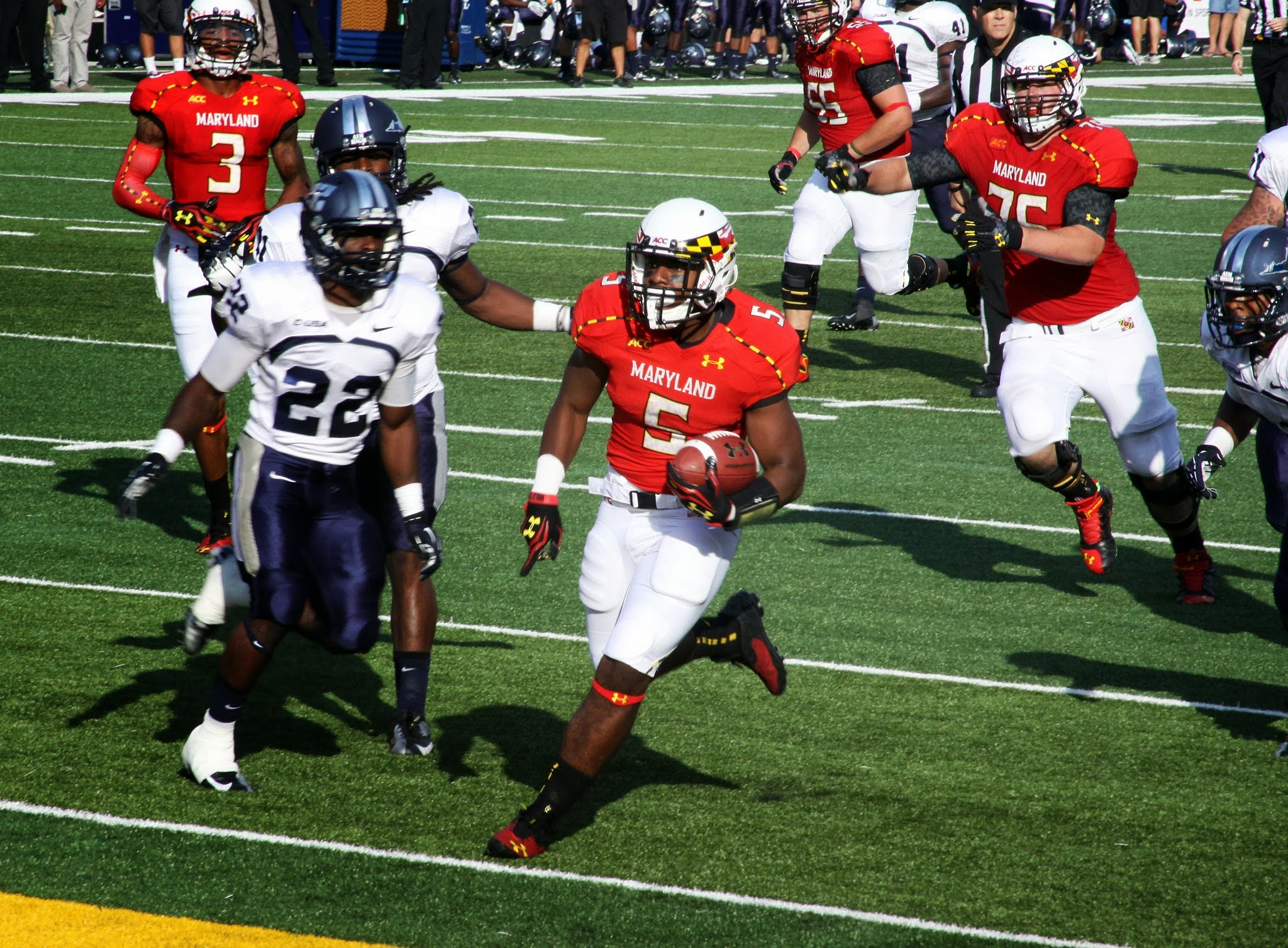
Maryland running back Albert Reid finds the endzone on a 27-yard run during the Terps 47–10 win over Old Dominion on September 7, 2013.

=== Connecticut ===
Maryland vs. Connecticut

Team	1	2	3	4	Total
• Terrapins	0	13	14	5	32
Huskies	7	3	3	8	21

- Date: September 14, 2013
- Location: Rentschler Field • East Hartford, Connecticut
- Game start: 7:34 p.m.
- Elapsed time: 3:16
- Game attendance: 38,916
- Game weather: Overcast, 62 °F (17 °C), Wind 5 mph (8.0 km/h) NW
- Referee: Jeff Flanagan
- TV announcers (ESPN3): Bob Picozzi (play-by-play), K. C. Keeler (color), John Brickley (sideline)

Scoring summary
1	10:21	UConn	Lyle McCombs 5-yard run (Chad Christen kick)	UConn 7–0
2	11:10	MD	C.J. Brown 41-yard run (Brad Craddock kick)	tied 7–7
2	7:44	MD	Brad Craddock 29-yard field goal	MD 10–7
2	4:05	UConn	Chad Christen 33-yard field goal	tied 10–10
2	0:00	MD	Brad Craddock 21-yard field goal	MD 13–10
3	9:04	MD	Stefon Diggs 12-yard pass from C.J. Brown (Brad Craddock kick)	MD 20–10
3	6:02	UConn	Chad Christen 34-yard field goal	MD 20–13
3	2:07	MD	Dexter McDougle 49-yard interception return (Brad Craddock kick)	MD 27–13
4	8:43	MD	team safety	MD 29–13
4	4:48	MD	Brad Craddock 40-yard field goal	MD 32–13
4	4:26	UConn	Shak. Phillips 75-yard pass from Chan. Whitmer (Geremy Davis pass from Chan. Whitmer conversion)	MD 32–21

On September 16, Coach Randy Edsall announced that starting cornerback Dexter McDougle would miss the rest of the season following a shoulder injury suffered against Connecticut on September 14. McDougle, a 5th year senior with no medical redshirt option, will see his playing career with the Terrapins come to an end.

=== West Virginia ===
West Virginia vs. Maryland

Team	1	2	3	4	Total
Mountaineers	0	0	0	0	0
• Terrapins	14	16	0	7	37

- Date: September 21, 2013
- Location: M&T Bank Stadium • Baltimore, Maryland
- Game start: 3:30 p.m.
- Elapsed time: 3:10
- Game attendance: 55,677
- Game weather: Cloudy, 76 °F (24 °C), Wind 13 mph (21 km/h) SW
- Referee: Dan Romeo
- TV announcers (ESPNU): Anish Shroff (play-by-play), Kelly Stouffer (color)

Scoring summary
1	4:41	MD	Dave Stinebaugh 6-yard pass from C.J. Brown (Brad Craddock kick)	MD 7–0
1	3:53	MD	A.J. Hendy 28-yard interception return (Brad Craddock kick)	MD 14–0
2	11:06	MD	Brad Craddock kick 50-yard field goal	MD 17–0
2	7:08	MD	Brad Craddock kick 36-yard field goal	MD 20–0
2	1:35	MD	Brad Craddock kick 30-yard field goal	MD 23–0
2	0:18	MD	C.J. Brown 1-yard run (Brad Craddock kick)	MD 30–0
4	4:18	MD	Brandon Ross 3-yard run (Brad Craddock kick)	MD 37–0

=== Florida State ===
Maryland vs. Florida State

Team	1	2	3	4	Total
Terrapins	0	0	0	0	0
• Seminoles	7	14	21	21	63

- Date: October 5, 2013
- Location: Doak Campbell Stadium • Tallahassee, Florida
- Game start: 12:00 p.m.
- TV announcers (ESPN): Dave Pasch (play-by-play), Brian Griese (color), Tom Luginbill (sidelines)

== Personnel ==
=== Coaches ===
Name	Position(s)	Year at Maryland	Alma mater	Sources
Randy Edsall	Head coach	3rd	Syracuse (1980)	
Mike Locksley	Offensive coordinator / quarterbacks	8th (Note: Mike Locksley was previously an assistant coach at Maryland from 1997–2002. He rejoined the Maryland coaching staff in 2012.)	Towson (1992)	
Brian Stewart	Defensive coordinator / defensive backs	2nd	Northern Arizona (1995)	
Tom Brattan	Offensive line	13th	Delaware (1972)	
Greg Gattuso	Assistant head coach / defensive line	3rd	Penn State (1983)	
Keith Dudzinski	Inside Linebackers	3rd	New Haven (1991)	
John Dunn	Tight Ends / recruiting coordinator	3rd	North Carolina (2005)	
Lee Hull	Wide receivers	6th	Holy Cross (1988)	
Lyndon Johnson	outside linebackers	3rd	Connecticut (1992)	
Andre Powell	Special teams coordinator / running backs	3rd	Indiana (1989)	
Drew Wilson	Director of strength and conditioning	3rd	King's College (2000)	
Justin Lima	Assistant strength and conditioning coach	2nd	Bridgewater State	
Alan Weber	Assistant strength and conditioning coach	3rd	Iowa	
Wes Robinson	Head Trainer	7th	Morehead State (1995)	

=== Roster ===
(to be added)

=== Depth chart ===
Defense

FS
Sean Davis
A. J. Hendy
Elvis Dennah

WLB	ILB	ILB	SLB
Matt Robinson	Cole Farrand	L. A. Goree	⋅
Alex Twine	Bradley Johnson	Abner Logan	⋅
Avery Thompson	Shawn Petty	Brock Dean	⋅

SS
Anthony Nixon
Zach Dancel
Undray Clark

CB
Dexter McDougle
Alvin Hill
Jarrett Ross

DE	NT	DE
Quinton Jefferson	Darious Kilgo	Keith Bowers
Roman Braglio	Nate Clarke	Zeke Riser
Andre Monroe	Alex Walker	Ty Tucker

CB
Jeremiah Johnson
Isaac Goins
William Likely

Offense

WR
Stefon Diggs
Levern Jacobs
DeAndre Lane

WR
Nigel King
Malcolm Culmer
Tyrek Cheeseboro

LT	LG	C	RG	RT
Mike Madaras	De'Onte Arnett	Sal Conaboy	Michael Dunn	Ryan Doyle
Jake Wheeler	Silvano Altamirano	Evan Mulrooney	Andrew Zeller	Moise Larose
⋅	⋅	⋅	⋅	⋅

TE
Dave Stinebaugh
P. J. Gallo
Brian McMahon

WR
Deon Long
Amba Etta-Tawo
Daniel Adams

QB
C. J. Brown
Caleb Rowe
Ricardo Young

Special teams
PK Brad Craddock
PK Adam Greene
P Nathan Renfro
P Michael Tart
KR Stefon Diggs
KRWilliam Likely
PR Stefon Diggs
PR William Likely
LS Greg Parcher

RB
Brandon Ross
Albert Reid
Jacquille Veii
