= Randy Edsall =

American football coach (born 1958)

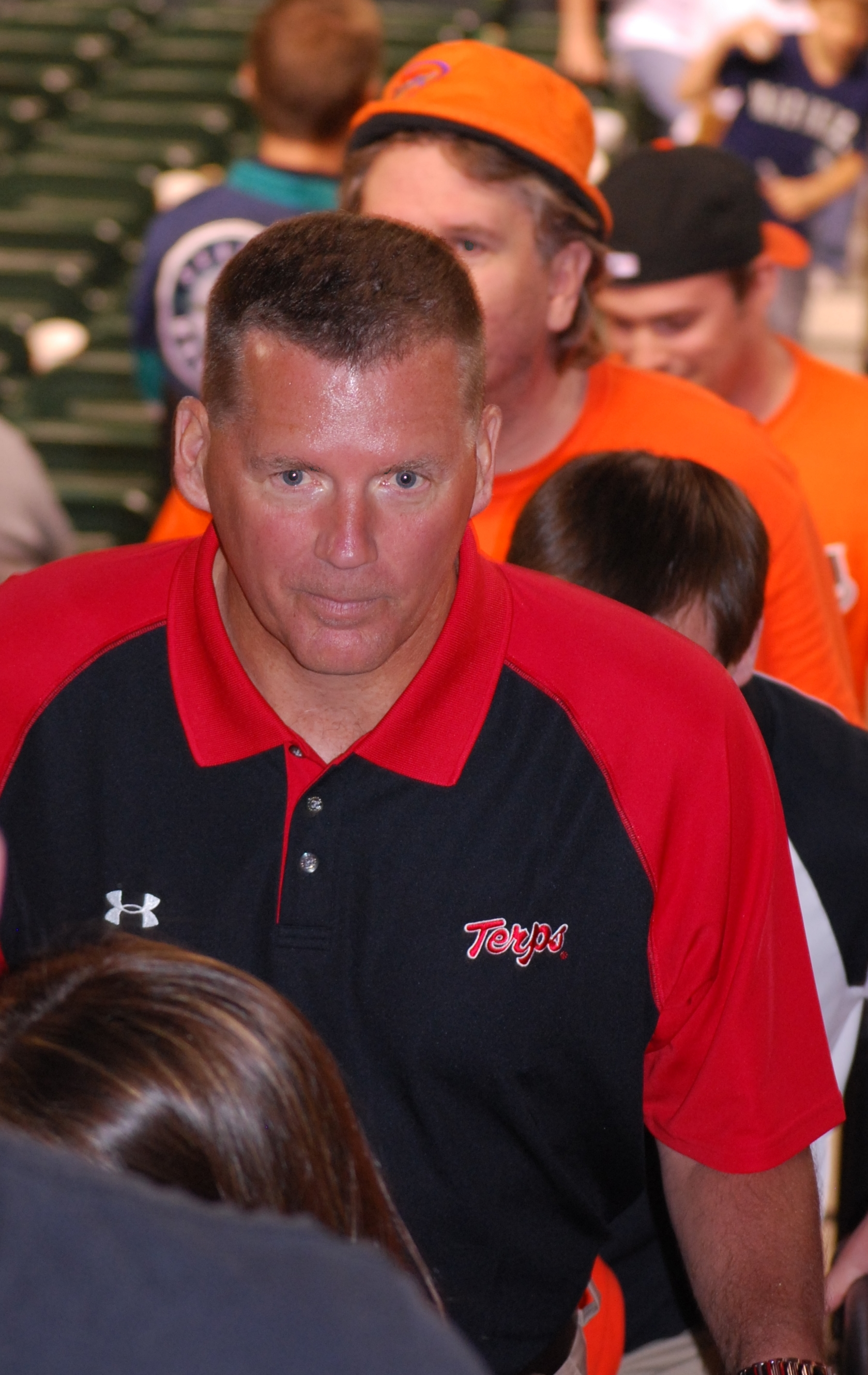
- Edsall in 2011

Biographical details
- Born: August 27, 1958 (age 68); Glen Rock, Pennsylvania, U.S.

Playing career
- 1976–1979: Syracuse
- Position: Quarterback

Coaching career (HC unless noted)
- 1980–1982: Syracuse (GA)
- 1983–1984: Syracuse (RB)
- 1985: Syracuse (TE)
- 1986: Syracuse (RB)
- 1987–1988: Syracuse (DB)
- 1989–1990: Syracuse (DB/RC)
- 1991–1993: Boston College (DB)
- 1994–1997: Jacksonville Jaguars (DB)
- 1998: Georgia Tech (DC/DB)
- 1999–2010: UConn
- 2011–2015: Maryland
- 2017–2021: UConn

Administrative career (AD unless noted)
- 2016: Detroit Lions (Director of football research)

Head coaching record
- Overall: 102–136
- Bowls: 3–4

Accomplishments and honors

Championships
- 2 Big East (2007, 2010)

Awards
- Big East Coach of the Year (2010)

Randy Douglas Edsall (born August 27, 1958) is an American former football coach who recently served as the head football coach for Connecticut from 1999 to 2010 and again from 2017 until his abrupt retirement in 2021. He also served as the head coach for Maryland from 2011 to 2015 and as the director of football research and special projects for the Detroit Lions of the National Football League (NFL) in 2016. During his first stint at UConn, he oversaw the program's promotion from the NCAA Division I-AA level to Division I-A. He is the program's all-time leader in wins and games coached.

== Coaching career ==
=== Early years ===
A native of Glen Rock, Pennsylvania, Edsall attended Susquehannock High School. He is a protege of former New York Giants head coach Tom Coughlin. Edsall played for Coughlin at Syracuse University and later coached under him at Syracuse, at Boston College, and with the Jacksonville Jaguars.

==== Syracuse ====
Edsall spent the first 14 years of his adult life at Syracuse as a player and coach. He played quarterback for the Orangemen from 1976 to 1979, with Coughlin as his position coach. He then coached at Syracuse under Frank Maloney and Dick MacPherson from 1980 to 1990 and was a part of the 1987 team that went 11–0–1, including a tie in the Sugar Bowl.

==== Boston College ====
He then went on to coach at Boston College with Tom Coughlin and was a part of a turnaround at BC. In 1993, they defeated No. 1 ranked Notre Dame in South Bend.

==== Jacksonville Jaguars ====
He then followed Coughlin to the Jacksonville Jaguars. The Jaguars made it to the AFC Championship Game in their second year as a franchise in 1996 and made the playoffs in 1997.

==== Georgia Tech ====
In 1998, he became the defensive coordinator at Georgia Tech and saw his defense improve greatly from the season before, including a co-ACC championship and a Gator Bowl victory over Notre Dame.

=== University of Connecticut (first stint) ===
==== 1999–2003 ====
Edsall was named the 27th head football coach at the University of Connecticut on December 21, 1998, and led the Huskies from Division I-AA into Division I-A. UConn was the first school to ever move from the FCS to the Bowl Championship Series as a member of the Big East. In what has been considered one of the best and fastest building jobs in recent memory, Randy Edsall oversaw a period of unprecedented success at the University of Connecticut. UConn went from Division I-AA into Division I-A, and in only their first year as a full member of the FBS in 2002, Edsall guided the 2002 team to a 6–6 record in its first year with a full Division I-A complement of 85 scholarships. UConn ended the 2002 season impressively with four-straight wins to reach the .500 mark, including season-ending road wins at Navy and at bowl-bound Iowa State of the Big 12 Conference led by Seneca Wallace that was ranked as high as 9th in the country that year, 49–37.

==== 2003 ====
The excitement for Edsall and his team continued to swell in 2003 as the Huskies moved into their new home, Rentschler Field, and enjoyed the nation's largest attendance increase with a gain of 21,252 fans per game. Finishing with a 9–3 record, many national media outlets, including Bristol-based ESPN, proclaimed that UConn should have received a bowl berth, a feat highly uncommon for an independent team. Also in 2003, UConn was the only public I-A school to graduate at least 90 percent of its football players.

==== 2004 ====
With their membership in the Big East for the 2004 season, another strong campaign by the Huskies resulted in a bowl berth. UConn went 8–4 against a challenging slate that fall as the program gained its highest ever level of exposure. Behind one of the best players in Connecticut history in Dan Orlovsky, the Huskies capped their historic season with a resounding 39–10 win over Mid-American Conference champion Toledo in the Motor City Bowl. That year saw 2 players get drafted, Dan Orlovsky, and Alfred Fincher.

==== 2005–2006 ====
The 2005–2006 seasons saw a period of transition for the program. After graduating many impactful seniors after the 2004 season, the Huskies finished the 2005 season 5–6. More of the same happened in the 2006 season as the Huskies finished 4–8.

==== 2007 ====
The 2007 season witnessed a new level of excitement in Storrs as the Huskies earned their first ever national rankings, peaking at No. 13 in the BCS standings on November 5. UConn became just the second Big East team to ever go 7–0 at home and defeated three teams there which were ranked in the Top 10 at some point during the season. That year they also beat their first ranked opponent in school history by beating #11 South Florida on October 27, 2007, 22–15. The Huskies finished that season at 9–4 with a berth in the Meineke Car Care Bowl, earning Edsall New England Division I Coach of the Year accolades.

==== 2008 ====
The 2008 season was also very successful. After a 5–0 start and a return to the top 25 rankings, the Huskies finished the season at 8–5 and defeated Buffalo in the International Bowl in Toronto, Canada, 38–20. After a record breaking year, Donald Brown became the first first round draft pick in school history.

==== 2009 ====
The 2009 season saw both great success and great tragedy. After defeating Louisville on October 17, 2009, Jasper Howard, a cornerback on the team was stabbed to death the next day outside of a school dance at the UConn Student Union. After this, the Huskies lost 3 games to West Virginia, Rutgers and Cincinnati by a combined 8 points. After a bye week, Edsall's Huskies won their final three regular season games in 2009 – including a historic double-overtime win over Notre Dame on November 21 at Notre Dame Stadium, 33–30. In their Bowl game they defeated South Carolina 20–7 in the PapaJohns.com Bowl. UConn posted a 7–5 regular season record facing the 25th-toughest regular season schedule in the country and with their bowl win they finished 8–5.

==== 2010 ====
On September 11, 2010, Edsall became the winningest coach in Connecticut football history with a 62–3 victory over Texas Southern. His 67th victory placed him ahead of the 66 wins compiled by J. Orlean Christian between 1934 and 1949. Edsall led the Huskies to a 33–19 record over his last four seasons there as UConn became the first program ever to go from FBS newcomer to BCS bowl participant in just seven seasons. After a 3–4 start, the Huskies beat West Virginia 13–10 in overtime for their first win over the Mountaineers in program history. UConn won their last five games of the regular season to earn a share of the Big East title, Edsall's second as head coach and UConn's second in four years. By virtue of their overtime win over the Mountaineers, the Huskies represented the Big East in the BCS, the first major bowl appearance in school history. UConn went on to play in the Fiesta Bowl against Oklahoma, losing 48–20. Edsall was named 2010 Big East Coach of the Year, however, the nature of his unannounced departure for another program clouded this triumph.

=== University of Maryland ===
==== 2011–2013 ====
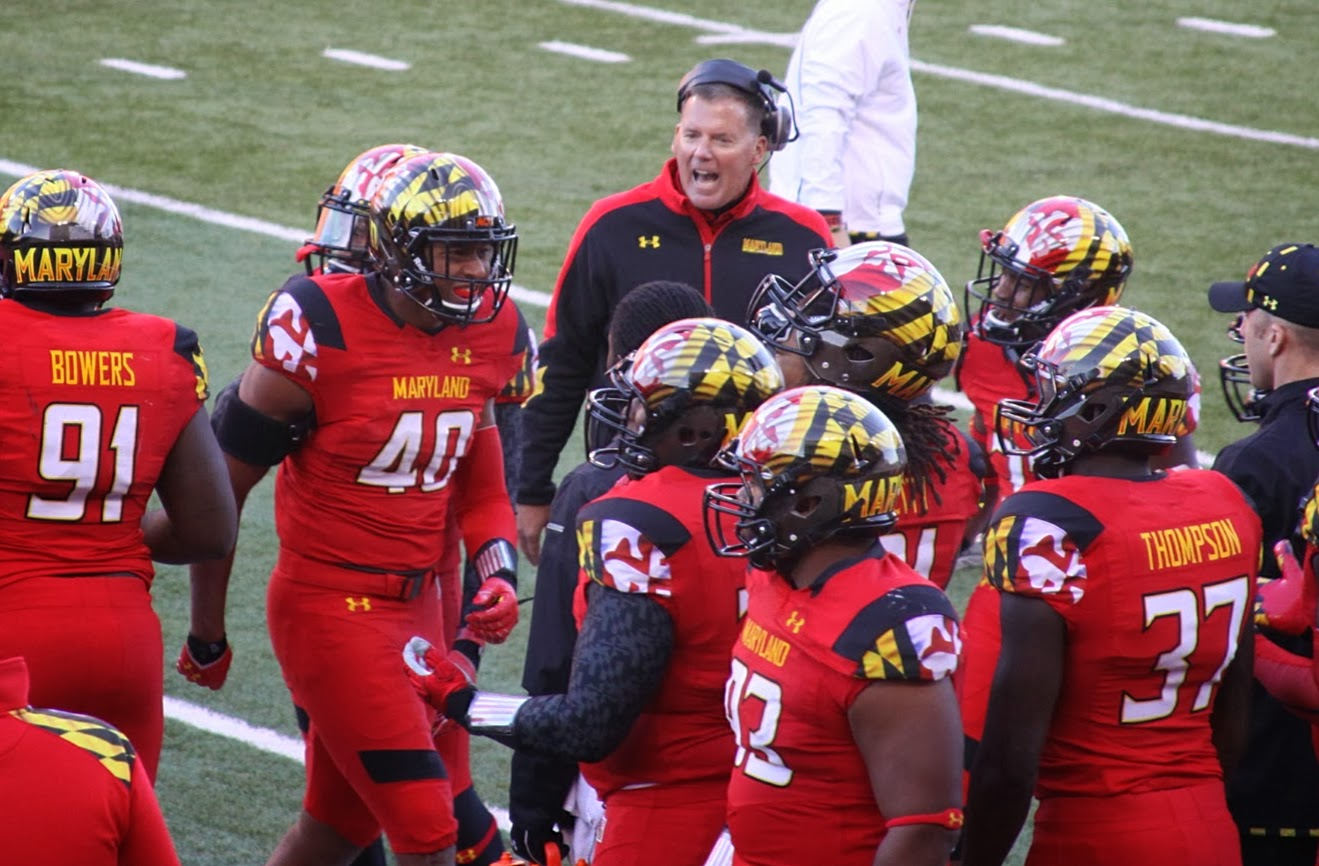
Randy Edsall along the sideline during the Terps' 2013 game vs. the Clemson Tigers.

Edsall was hired in 2011 in the midst of his leading the University of Connecticut to its first appearance in a BCS bowl game. In Edsall's inaugural season, the Terrapins finished with a record of 2–10. In 2012, the Terrapins finished with a 4–8 record. On November 19, 2012, the school announced it was leaving the Atlantic Coast Conference, a conference Maryland co-founded in 1953 with Clemson, Duke, North Carolina, North Carolina State, South Carolina and Wake Forest, and joining the Big Ten Conference. The Big Ten is a revenue-sharing conference that, thanks to the success of the Big Ten Network, in recent years, has generated more revenue than any other conference, distributing that money among its members.

In 2013, his third season as head coach, after one of the program's biggest wins over West Virginia, Edsall led his 4–0 team into the Associated Press top 25 poll, entering at #25. They fell out of the rankings the following week after a road loss to eventual National Champion Florida State, then ranked #8. The highlight of the season came in Lane Stadium at Virginia Tech. The Terrapins had multiple starters out due to injury heading into the game. Maryland stunned Virginia Tech and all but ended their ACC Championship hopes by beating them in overtime, 27–24. The victory also made the Terrapins bowl eligible. It was the first time since 1949 that the Terrapins won in Lane Stadium and the first time since 1990 that Maryland had beaten Virginia Tech, though until Tech's entry into the ACC, the teams had played only rarely. The Terrapins finished the regular season 7–5, earning bowl eligibility. In the Terrapins final game of the regular season, the team ended on a high note: winning their final conference game as a member of the ACC, 41–21 on the road against NC State. The Terrapins were invited to the Military Bowl in Annapolis, which they lost, 31–20, to Marshall.

==== 2014 ====
In 2014, Edsall guided the Terrapins to a third-place finish in the Big Ten East, finishing behind Michigan State and the eventual National Champion Ohio State Buckeyes. After a 3–1 start, the Terrapins won their inaugural Big Ten game with a victory at Indiana 37–15. They then went on to win their first game at home in the Big Ten, defeating the Iowa Hawkeyes 38–31. The Terrapins' biggest win of the season and one of the biggest wins in program history came on November 1, 2014, when they traveled to State College, Pennsylvania to play the Penn State Nittany Lions. Previously, Penn State had dominated the series and the rivalry with a record of 35–1–1 against Maryland and the Terrapins had never won in Beaver Stadium. Maryland's lone win had come at Byrd Stadium in 1961. Brad Craddock, the eventual Lou Groza Award winner, kicked a 43-yard field goal with 51 seconds left to give the Terrapins their first win at Beaver Stadium and their first win over the Nittany Lions since 1961. Trying to build this old regional rivalry back up, in a post-game interview Randy Edsall said "let the rivalry begin". A few weeks later saw another milestone for the Maryland Football program. Maryland had never beaten Michigan in football in 3 prior meetings with the Wolverines. On November 22, 2014, the Terrapins ended that streak by beating Michigan in the Big House 23–16, which assured the Terrapins of back-to-back winning seasons for just the third time in the past 30 years. The Terrapins finished their inaugural Big Ten season 7–5 (4–4) with a third-place finish in the East division. They posted the conference's best road record at 5–1. The Terrapins also made it to back-to-back bowl games as they were invited to the Foster Farms Bowl in Santa Clara, California, where they lost to Stanford, 45–21.

==== 2015 ====
On June 30, 2015, it was announced that the University of Maryland and Edsall had agreed upon a three-year extension through 2019 worth $7.5 million. After a 2–4 start, Edsall was fired on October 11, 2015, with offensive coordinator Mike Locksley named interim head coach for the rest of the season.

=== Detroit Lions ===
==== 2016 ====
On January 31, 2016, Edsall was named director of football research, special projects, for the Detroit Lions of the National Football League (NFL). Lions general manager Bob Quinn was a graduate assistant in the Connecticut athletic department when Edsall was the head coach for the Huskies in 1999.

=== University of Connecticut (second stint) ===
==== 2017 ====
After a year of being away from college football, Edsall returned to Connecticut where he had previously been the head coach for 12 years. During his first month back, Edsall created a media backlash by withdrawing a scholarship from linebacker Ryan Dickens, who had verbally committed to Connecticut under fired head coach Bob Diaco, two weeks before signing day. Dickens later ended up at Lafayette, a lower-level FCS school.

==== 2018 ====
In 2018, Edsall was involved in a controversy over nepotism in the football program and favoritism in the State General Assembly. The Hartford Courant reported that Public Act 18–175, a bill about state management of online data, included a one-paragraph amendment to the end of the 11-page bill that read, "A state employee who is employed at a constituent unit of the state system of higher education and a member of the immediate family of such state employee may be employed in the same department or division of such constituent unit." It was alleged that this legislation had been introduced on behalf of Edsall so that he could employ his own son, Corey Edsall, against the recommendations of the State Ethics Committee. The plan was reportedly hatched during the Carmen Cozza all-state high school football banquet at the Aqua Turf Club in Southington. Joe Aresimowicz introduced the legislation that created a loophole for Edsall's son after Edsall spoke to him about the matter. Aresimowicz didn't deny that this was the motivation behind the legislation commented that "As a head coach for over 20 years I've talked to other coaches who say Corey is a first class coach and knows what he is doing," he told the Hartford Courant. "I believe that UConn has the checks and balances in place to ensure that no one is taking advantage of this situation." In 2017, UConn and Edsall appealed the CT State Ethics Board ruling saying they violated the state's nepotism laws by hiring his son as an assistant coach. After the change in legislation, the appeal continued on its own merits.

In November 2018, a Superior Court judge ruled that UConn did not violate state ethics codes when it hired Corey Edsall to be a coach on his father's football staff. In a 41-page ruling, Judge Joseph Shortall said the state ethics board "abused its discretion" and was "clearly erroneous" in its key ruling in the case.

=== 2021 ===
On September 5, 2021, Edsall announced he would retire after the conclusion of the 2021 season after an 0–2 start. The following day, he stepped aside immediately as the result of a "mutual decision" between him and school administration.

== Personal life ==
Edsall has two children, a son Corey, who is an offensive quality control assistant at Stanford after spending six seasons at UConn and the previous two years on the staff at Colorado, and a daughter, with his wife.

He is a graduate of Syracuse University, where he played as a quarterback. His brother, Duke, is an NCAA basketball official.

== Head coaching record ==
Year	Team	Overall	Conference	Standing	Bowl/playoffs
Connecticut Huskies (Atlantic 10 Conference) (1999)
1999	Connecticut	4–7	3–5	T–6th	
Connecticut Huskies (NCAA Division I-A independent) (2000–2003)
2000	Connecticut	3–8			
2001	Connecticut	2–9			
2002	Connecticut	6–6			
2003	Connecticut	9–3			
Connecticut Huskies (Big East Conference) (2004–2011)
2004	Connecticut	8–4	3–3	5th	W Motor City
2005	Connecticut	5–6	2–5	T–6th	
2006	Connecticut	4–8	1–6	T–7th	
2007	Connecticut	9–4	5–2	T–1st	L Meineke Car Care
2008	Connecticut	8–5	3–4	5th	W International
2009	Connecticut	8–5	3–4	T–4th	W PapaJohns.com
2010	Connecticut	8–5	5–2	T–1st	L Fiesta^{†}
Maryland Terrapins (Atlantic Coast Conference) (2011–2013)
2011	Maryland	2–10	1–7	6th (Atlantic)	
2012	Maryland	4–8	2–6	5th (Atlantic)	
2013	Maryland	7–6	3–5	5th (Atlantic)	L Military
Maryland Terrapins (Big Ten Conference) (2014–2015)
2014	Maryland	7–6	4–4	3rd (East)	L Foster Farms
2015	Maryland	2–4 (Note: Edsall served as Maryland's head coach for the first six games of the 2015 season before he was fired. Mike Locksley was named interim head coach and led the team for the final six games of the season. The Terrapins finished the year 3–9 overall and 1–7 in conference play, tying for sixth place in the Big Ten's East Division.)	0–2		
Maryland:		22–34	10–24		
UConn Huskies (American Athletic Conference) (2017–2019)
2017	UConn	3–9	2–6	T–4th (East)	
2018	UConn	1–11	0–8	6th (East)	
2019	UConn	2–10	0–8	6th (East)	
UConn Huskies (NCAA Division I FBS independent) (2020–2021)
2020	No team—COVID-19				
2021	UConn	0–2			
UConn:		80–102	24–47		
Total:		102–136			
National championship Conference title Conference division title or championship game berth
^{†}Indicates BCS bowl.
