= Bruce Perry =

American football player (born 1981)

No. 35
- Positions: Running back, cornerback

Personal information
- Born: March 22, 1981 (age 45); Philadelphia, Pennsylvania, U.S.
- Listed height: 5 ft 7 in (1.70 m)
- Listed weight: 200 lb (91 kg)

Career information
- College: Maryland
- NFL draft: 2004: 7th round, 242nd overall pick

Career history
- Philadelphia Eagles (2004–2006); Montreal Alouettes (2007)

Awards and highlights
- Second-team All-American (2001); ACC Offensive Player of the Year (2001); First-team All-ACC (2001)

Career NFL statistics
- Rushing attempts: 16
- Rushing yards: 74
- Return yards: 330
- Stats at Pro Football Reference

Bruce Perry (born March 22, 1981) is an American former professional football player who was a running back in the National Football League (NFL) for the Philadelphia Eagles and in the Canadian Football League (CFL) for the Montreal Alouettes. He played college football for the Maryland Terrapins, earning Atlantic Coast Conference Offensive Player of the Year honors as just a sophomore in 2001. The rest of his college and pro career was hampered by numerous injuries.

== Early life ==
Perry is a Philadelphia native and attended George Washington High School. He also attended Cardinal Dougherty High School in Philadelphia.

== College career ==
Perry played college football at the University of Maryland, College Park, and started all 11 games as a sophomore. That year, he rushed 219 times for 1,242 yards and ten touchdowns in addition to catching 40 passes for 359 yards and two touchdowns, leading Maryland to an ACC Championship and an appearance in the 2002 Orange Bowl. He won ACC Offensive Player of the Year as the second non-senior to do so and was a second-team All-American. Perry was also a first-team All ACC selection and was a finalist for the Doak Walker Award. Perry ranked 19th in the NCAA in rushing yards per game and ninth in all purpose yards per game. Against Wake Forest, Perry rushed for 276 yards.

In his junior year, Perry was out with an injury until an October game against Duke. He immediately injured himself in the Duke game, and did not start again for the rest of the season. Perry appeared in five more games in 2002, averaging 4.7 yards per carry on the season.

As a senior, Perry started four games and played in nine. He finished with 646 rushing yards despite being hampered by injuries all season. Against Wake Forest, Perry had 25 carries for 237 yards and three touchdowns. He finished his college career ranked fourth among Maryland's career rushing leaders.

== Professional career ==
=== Philadelphia Eagles ===
Perry was selected by the Eagles in the seventh round of the 2004 NFL draft. He spent his entire rookie season on injured reserve. After the 2005 pre-season, he was placed on the practice squad. Later in the season, he was activated and saw his first start in the final game of the regular season.

Perry appeared in the 2006 pre-season and sustained a serious concussion in the game. Even though Perry made the team, he was converted to cornerback and then was cut in September when the Eagles signed veteran Dexter Wynn for depth at cornerback. The team re-signed Perry to the practice squad. He was released on January 2, 2007.

=== Montreal Alouettes ===
Perry signed with the Montreal Alouettes in 2007 but on July 12, 2007, it was announced that he had suffered a season-ending injury.
