= John Kaleo =

American football player and coach (born 1971)

No. 3
- Position: Quarterback

Personal information
- Born: February 5, 1971 (age 55); Bowie, Maryland, U.S.
- Listed height: 6 ft 0 in (1.83 m)
- Listed weight: 210 lb (95 kg)

Career information
- High school: Bowie
- College: Maryland
- NFL draft: 1993: undrafted

Career history

Playing
- Sacramento Gold Miners (1993)*; Toronto Argonauts (1993)*; Albany Firebirds (1993); Cleveland Thunderbolts (1994); Memphis Pharaohs (1995)*; St. Louis Stampede (1995–1996); San Jose SaberCats (1997); Anaheim Piranhas (1997); New England Sea Wolves (1999); Tampa Bay Storm (2000–2003); Austin Wranglers (2004); Los Angeles Avengers (2005); Columbus Destroyers (2006); Tampa Bay Storm (2007)
- * Offseason or practice squad member only

Coaching
- Iona (QB/OC) (2007–2008); Towson (QB) (2009–2010); Tampa Bay Storm (OC) (2011)

Awards and highlights
- ArenaBowl champion (2003); All-American (1990); NJCAA Player of the Year (1990); Montgomery College HoF (1998); NJCAA Hall of Fame (1999)

Career AFL statistics
- Comp. / Att.: 2,929 / 4,880
- Passing yards: 35,335
- TD–INT: 581–146
- Passer rating: 99.57
- Rushing TD: 59
- Stats at ArenaFan.com

John Kaleo (born February 5, 1971) is an American former professional football quarterback who played in the Arena Football League (AFL) for the Albany Firebirds (1993), Cleveland Thunderbolts (1994), St. Louis Stampede (1995–1996), Anaheim Piranhas (1997), San Jose SaberCats (1997), New England Sea Wolves (1999), Tampa Bay Storm (2000–2003, 2007), Austin Wranglers (2004), Los Angeles Avengers (2005), and Columbus Destroyers (2006). He won ArenaBowl XVII with the Storm in 2003. He retired from playing after the 2007 season.

== Early life ==
John Kaleo attended South River High School in Edgewater, Maryland and Bowie High School in Bowie, Maryland. He was a one-year varsity starter at South River High School and two-year starter at quarterback on the Bowie High football team, and also played basketball, track & field, and baseball.

== College career ==
Kaleo attended Montgomery College for two years. As a sophomore, he was a Junior College All-American, the NJCAA Player of the Year, and was voted the JUCO Player of the Year by the Washington, D.C. Touchdown Club.

Kaleo then transferred to the University of Maryland for his final two seasons. As a senior, he set single-season school records in passing yards (3,392), completions (286), attempts (482), total yards (3,472) as well as single-game touchdown passes with five. After his senior year, he participated in the Blue–Gray Football Classic.

== Coaching career ==
Kaleo served two seasons, 2007 and 2008, as the offensive coordinator and quarterbacks coach for the Iona College Gaels. In 2009, newly hired Towson head coach Rob Ambrose selected Kaleo as his quarterbacks coach.

Kaleo was named the offensive coordinator for the Tampa Bay Storm in 2011.
