= 2014 Maryland Terrapins football team =

American college football season

2014 Maryland Terrapins football

Foster Farms Bowl, L 21–45 vs. Stanford
- Conference: Big Ten Conference
- East Division
- Record: 7–6 (4–4 Big Ten)
- Head coach: Randy Edsall (4th season)
- Offensive coordinator: Mike Locksley (3rd season)
- Offensive scheme: Multiple
- Defensive coordinator: Brian Stewart (3rd season)
- Base defense: 3–4
- Home stadium: Byrd Stadium

2014 Big Ten Conference football standings
	Conf.			Overall
Team	W		L	W		L
East Division
No. 1 Ohio State x$#^	8	–	0	14	–	1
No. T–5 Michigan State	7	–	1	11	–	2
Maryland	4	–	4	7	–	6
Rutgers	3	–	5	8	–	5
Michigan	3	–	5	5	–	7
Penn State	2	–	6	7	–	6
Indiana	1	–	7	4	–	8
West Division
No. 13 Wisconsin x	7	–	1	11	–	3
Minnesota	5	–	3	8	–	5
Nebraska	5	–	3	9	–	4
Iowa	4	–	4	7	–	6
Illinois	3	–	5	6	–	7
Northwestern	3	–	5	5	–	7
Purdue	1	–	7	3	–	9
Championship: Ohio State 59, Wisconsin 0
# – College Football Playoff champion; ^ – College Football Playoff participant; $ – Conference champion; x – Division champion/co-champions; Rankings from AP Poll

The 2014 Maryland Terrapins football team represented the University of Maryland, College Park in the 2014 NCAA Division I FBS football season. The Terrapins were led by fourth-year head coach Randy Edsall and played their home games at Byrd Stadium. This marked the Terrapins' inaugural season as a member of the Big Ten Conference and the Big Ten East Division after 61 seasons as a member of the Atlantic Coast Conference.

The non-conference slate included a game against Syracuse, who joined the ACC in 2013 and was part of the Atlantic Division with Maryland in the Terrapins' final season in the ACC, and regional rival West Virginia, in the schools' 51st contest. Maryland finished with a 4–4 record in Big Ten play, placing third in the East Division behind ranked teams Ohio State and Michigan State. Ending the regular season at 7–5, Maryland accepted an invitation to the Foster Farms Bowl, where Stanford defeated the Terrapins, 45–21.

== Schedule ==
Date	Time	Opponent	Site	TV	Result	Attendance
August 30	3:30 pm	James Madison*	Byrd Stadium; College Park, MD	BTN	W 52–7	45,080
September 6	3:30 pm	at South Florida*	Raymond James Stadium; Tampa, FL	CBSSN	W 24–17	28,915
September 13	12:00 pm	West Virginia*	Byrd Stadium; College Park, MD (rivalry)	BTN	L 37–40	48,154
September 20	12:30 pm	at Syracuse*	Carrier Dome; Syracuse, NY	ACCN	W 34–20	40,511
September 27	1:30 pm	at Indiana	Memorial Stadium; Bloomington, IN	BTN	W 37–15	44,313
October 4	12:00 pm	No. 20 Ohio State	Byrd Stadium; College Park, MD	ABC	L 24–52	51,802
October 18	12:00 pm	Iowa^{†}	Byrd Stadium; College Park, MD	ESPN2	W 38–31	48,373
October 25	12:00 pm	at Wisconsin	Camp Randall Stadium; Madison, WI	BTN	L 7–52	80,336
November 1	12:00 pm	at Penn State	Beaver Stadium; University Park, PA (rivalry)	ESPN2	W 20–19	103,969
November 15	8:00 pm	No. 12 Michigan State	Byrd Stadium; College Park, MD	BTN	L 15–37	51,802
November 22	3:30 pm	at Michigan	Michigan Stadium; Ann Arbor, MI	BTN	W 23–16	101,717
November 29	3:30 pm	Rutgers	Byrd Stadium; College Park, MD	ESPNU	L 38–41	36,673
December 30	10:00 pm	vs. Stanford*	Levi's Stadium; Santa Clara, CA (Foster Farms Bowl)	ESPN	L 21–45	34,780
*Non-conference game; ^{†}Homecoming; Rankings from AP Poll released prior to the game; All times are in Eastern time

== Roster ==
2014 Maryland Terrapins football team roster
Players
Coaches
Offense

Pos.	#	Name	Class
WR	1	Stefon Diggs	Sr
WR	6	Deon Long	Sr
QB	11	Perry Hills	So
QB	16	C. J. Brown	Sr

Defense

Pos.	#	Name	Class
S	21	Sean Davis	Jr
DT	97	Darius Kilgo	Sr
DL	99	Quinton Jefferson	Jr

Special teams

Pos.	#	Name	Class
K	3	Adam Greene	Fr

Head coach

- Randy Edsall

Coordinators/assistant coaches

- Mike Locksley (offensive coordinator / quarterbacks)
- Keith Dudzinski (inside linebackers)
- John Dunn (tight ends / recruiting coordinator)
- Lyndon Johnson (assistant head coach / outside linebackers)
- Keenan McCardell (wide receivers)
- Greg Studrawa (offensive line)
- Chad Wilt (defensive line)

Legend

- (C) Team captain
- (S) Suspended
- (I) Ineligible
- Injured
- Redshirt

Roster

== Season summary ==
=== Penn State ===
Team	1	2	3	4	Total
• Maryland	0	7	0	13	20
Penn St	3	6	7	3	19

- Date: November 1
- Location: Beaver Stadium
- Game start: 12:00 p.m. EST
- TV announcers (ESPN2): Beth Mowins, Joey Galloway, Paul Carcaterra

Scoring summary
Q1	10:56	PSU	Ficken 47 yard field goal	PSU 3–0
Q2	13:52	MD	Gallo 2 yard pass from C. Brown (Craddock kick)	MD 7–3
Q2	5:06	PSU	Ficken 25 yard field goal	MD 7–6
Q2	1:30	PSU	Ficken 46 yard field goal	PSU 9–7
Q3	3:18	PSU	James 8 yard pass from Hackenberg (Ficken kick)	PSU 16–7
Q4	13:11	MD	Craddock 25 yard field goal	PSU 16–10
Q4	11:30	MD	W. Brown 1 yard run (Craddock kick)	MD 17–16
Q4	6:52	PSU	Ficken 48 yard field goal	PSU 19–17
Q4	:51	MD	Craddock 43 yard field goal	MD 20–19
