= Brad Craddock =

Australian gridiron football player (born 1992)

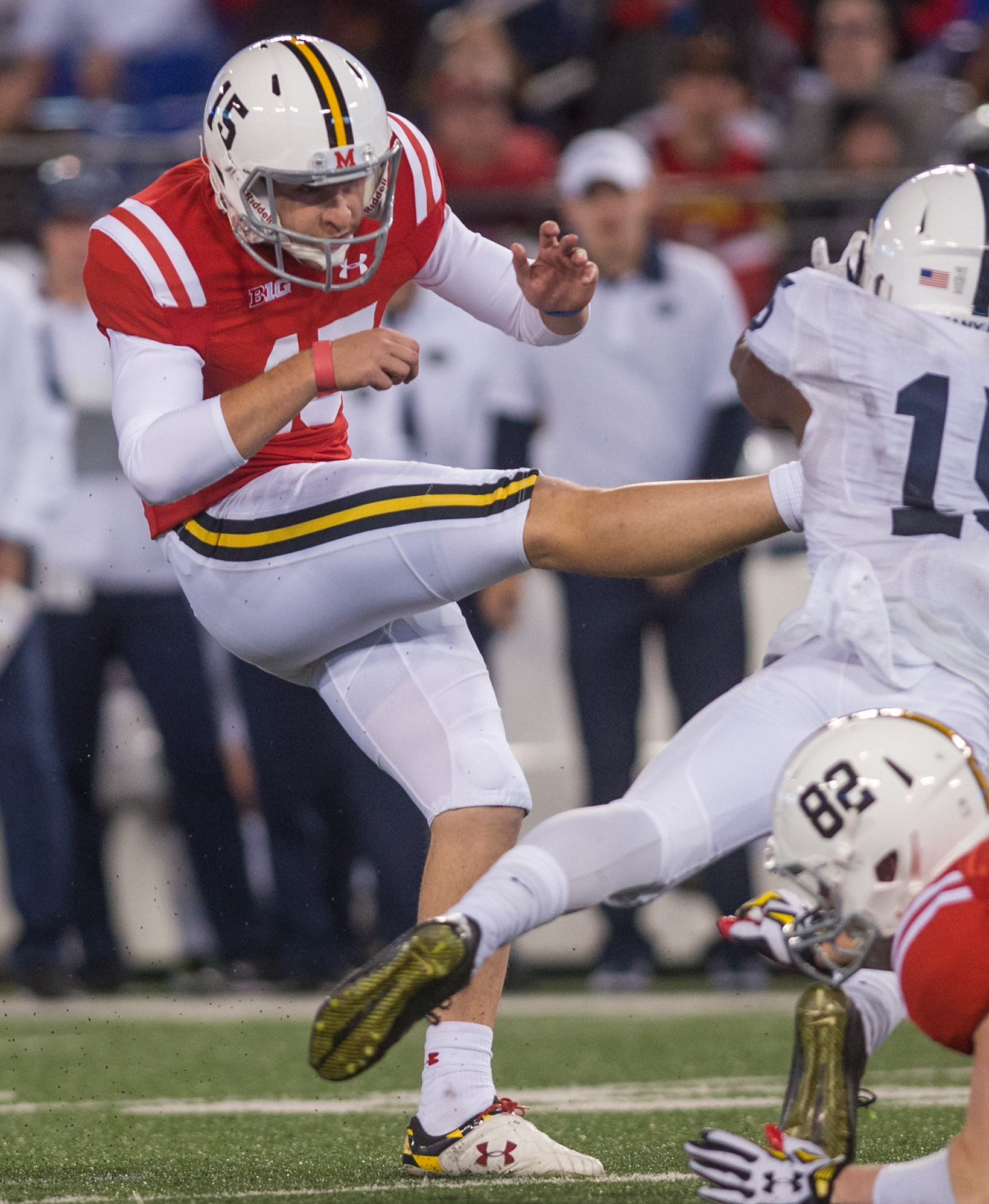
- Craddock with the Maryland Terrapins in 2015

No. 15
- Position: Placekicker

Personal information
- Born: 24 June 1992 (age 34); Adelaide, Australia
- Listed height: 6 ft 0 in (1.83 m)
- Listed weight: 186 lb (84 kg)

Career information
- High school: Tabor Christian College (South Plympton, South Australia)
- College: Maryland (2012–2015)
- NFL draft: 2016: undrafted

Career history
- Cleveland Browns (2016)*
- * Offseason or practice squad member only

Awards and highlights
- Lou Groza Award (2014); First-team All-American (2014); Big Ten Kicker of the Year (2014); First-team All-Big Ten (2014)
- Stats at Pro Football Reference

Brad Craddock (born 24 June 1992) is an Australian former college football player who was a placekicker for the Maryland Terrapins. He was a first-team All-American, winning the Lou Groza Award in 2014.

== Early life ==
Craddock was born in Adelaide to Raymond and Leonie Craddock. He attended Tabor Christian College. He began learning to punt at the age of 8 while playing Australian rules football. Craddock attended OzPunt, a developmental program for aspiring punters, placekickers, and holders in American football. He left the program with a 4.5/5 rating and as the top kicking prospect in Australia in 2012. Craddock enrolled in the University of Maryland, College Park soon after graduating the program.

== College career ==
At 6-foot (1.8 m) tall, Craddock was initially supposed to play as a punter with the Maryland Terrapins. Instead, he was moved to the position of placekicker. As a result, he encountered many difficulties in his first year with the team. He finished the season with only 10 of 16 field goals made, posting a 62.5 success rate, and 3 of 5 successful attempts at field goals beyond 40 yards (37 meters), including one from beyond 50 yards (46 meters). He also handled kickoff duties for the Terrapins.

Under the tutelage of former Pro Bowl kicker and Baltimore Ravens player Matt Stover, Craddock's stats improved greatly in his second season with the Terrapins. In one of his career highlights, Craddock converted 3 field goals, including one from 50 yards (46 meters), help the Terrapins to a 37–0 win over West Virginia University.

Craddock entered the Big Ten along with the Terrapins. In a game against Pennsylvania State University, Craddock kicked a 43-yard (39-meter) field goal with less than a minute to go for the Terrapins to take the lead. The Terrapins won 20–19 and became bowl-eligible. After the kick, Maryland head coach Randy Edsall summarized the game with one quote, "Let the rivalry begin." He finished the year having made 18 of 19 field goals for a 94.7 percent success rate. He posted a long of 57 yards (52 meters) and his lone miss came on his last kick of the season from 54 yards (49 meters) out. Craddock earned national recognition as a 2nd team All American award, and received the Lou Groza Award, awarded annually to the United States's most effective collegiate placekicker.

=== Records ===
In his three years of collegiate football, Craddock has accrued several records. As of 2014, he has scored the most consecutive field goals in the history of the Maryland Terrapins and the entire Big Ten Conference (24 field goals), as well as the longest field goal in Terrapins history (57 yards (52 meters) against Ohio State University). Craddock also recorded the highest per-season conversion rate in the school's history (94.7%) as well as the highest career field goal conversion rate (81.7%).

== Professional career ==
After going unselected in the 2016 NFL draft, Craddock signed with the Cleveland Browns on 5 May 2016. He was waived by the team on 18 May 2016.

== Personal life ==
Brad Craddock has two siblings: Alanah and Jacqui. He majored in agricultural and resource economics with a focus on agribusiness.

Craddock grew up in his home town of Adelaide, Australia, the namesake of his nickname, The Adelaide Kid.

== Statistics ==
Through the end of the 2014 regular season, Craddock's statistics are as follows:

Maryland Terrapins
Season	Games	Games Started	Kicking									Extra Points		Total
Season	Games	Games Started	FGM	FGA	PCT	1–19	20–29	30–39	40–49	50–59	Long	XPM	XPA	PTS
2012	9	9	10	16	62.5	0–0	3–5	3–5	3–5	1–1	52	23	25	53
2013	12	12	21	25	84.0	0–0	8–8	8–9	4–5	1–3	50	37	38	100
2014	12	12	18	19	94.7	0–0	3–3	4–4	9–9	2–3	57	41	41	95
2015	9	9	8	10	80.0	0–0	4–4	3–3	1–1	0–2	44	22	23	46
