= New Mexico State Aggies football statistical leaders =

The New Mexico State Aggies football statistical leaders are individual statistical leaders of the New Mexico State Aggies football program in various categories, including passing, rushing, receiving, total offense, defensive stats, and kicking. Within those areas, the lists identify single-game, single-season, and career leaders. The Aggies represent New Mexico State University in the NCAA Division I FBS Conference USA (CUSA).

Although New Mexico State began competing in intercollegiate football in 1894, the school's official record book considers the "modern era" to have begun in 1954. Records from before this year are often incomplete and inconsistent, and they are generally not included in these lists.

These lists are dominated by more recent players for several reasons:

- Since 1954, seasons have increased from 10 games to 11 and then 12 games in length.
- Additionally, NCAA rules allow teams that play at Hawaii to schedule an extra game in that season. The Aggies most recently played at Hawaii in 2023, which allowed them to play 13 regular-season games instead of the standard 12.
- The NCAA didn't allow freshmen to play varsity football until 1972 (with the exception of the World War II years), allowing players to have four-year careers.
- Bowl games only began counting toward single-season and career statistics in 2002. At that time, the Aggies had not played in a bowl game since 1960, and they have only played in three since then (2017, 2022, 2023). Nevertheless, this gave players in those seasons an extra game in which to compile statistics.
- The Aggies accumulated many yards of offense during Hal Mumme's four-year stint as head coach from 2005 through 2008.
- Since 2018, players have been allowed to participate in as many as four games in a redshirt season; previously, playing in even one game "burned" the redshirt. Since 2024, postseason games have not counted against the four-game limit. These changes to redshirt rules have given very recent players several extra games to accumulate statistics.
- CUSA has held a championship game since 2005. New Mexico State appeared in this game in its first CUSA season in 2023, giving players in that season yet another game to compile statistics.
- Due to COVID-19 issues, the NCAA ruled that the 2020 season would not count against the athletic eligibility of any football player, giving everyone who played in that season the opportunity for five years of eligibility instead of the normal four.

These lists are updated through the end of the 2025 season.

== Passing ==
=== Passing yards ===
Career
Rk	Player	Yards	Years
1	Chase Holbrook	11,846	2006 2007 2008
2	Tyler Rogers	10,372	2014 2015 2016 2017
3	Cody Ledbetter	7,480	1991 1993 1994 1995
4	Joe Pisarcik	5,770	1971 1972 1973
5	K. C. Enzminger	5,416	1998 1999 2000 2001
6	Tyler Adkins	5,151	2018 2019
7	Buck Pierce	4,927	2001 2002 2003 2004
8	Jamie McAlister	4,864	1979 1980 1981 1982
9	Diego Pavia	4,423	2022 2023
10	Andrew Manley	4,260	2010 2011 2012

Single season
Rk	Player	Yards	Year
1	Chase Holbrook	4,619	2006
2	Tyler Rogers	4,016	2017
3	Chase Holbrook	3,866	2007
4	Cody Ledbetter	3,501	1995
5	Chase Holbrook	3,361	2008
6	Diego Pavia	2,973	2023
7	Charles Puleri	2,788	1992
8	Tyler Rogers	2,779	2014
9	Andrew Manley	2,764	2012
10	Jonah Johnson	2,705	2021

Single game
Rk	Player	Yards	Year	Opponent
1	Cody Ledbetter	546	1995	UNLV
2	David Spriggs	536	1978	Southern Illinois
3	Chase Holbrook	529	2006	Boise State
4	Chase Holbrook	514	2006	Louisiana Tech
5	Chase Holbrook	506	2006	UTEP
6	Chase Holbrook	486	2008	Louisiana Tech
7	Chase Holbrook	475	2006	New Mexico
8	Tyler Rogers	474	2017	Texas State
9	Chase Holbrook	473	2007	New Mexico
10	Tyler Rogers	451	2017	South Alabama

=== Passing touchdowns ===
Career
Rk	Player	TDs	Years
1	Chase Holbrook	85	2006 2007 2008
2	Tyler Rogers	69	2014 2015 2016 2017
3	Cody Ledbetter	55	1991 1993 1994 1995
4	Charley Johnson	40	1958 1959 1960
	Sal Olivas	40	1964 1965 1966 1967
6	K. C. Enzminger	39	1998 1999 2000 2001
	Diego Pavia	39	2022 2023
8	Jamie McAlister	36	1979 1980 1981 1982
9	Ty Houghtaling	31	1996 1997 1998 1999
10	Joe Pisarcik	30	1971 1972 1973
	Buck Pierce	30	2001 2002 2003 2004

Single season
Rk	Player	TDs	Year
1	Chase Holbrook	34	2006
2	Cody Ledbetter	30	1995
3	Tyler Rogers	27	2017
4	Chase Holbrook	26	2007
	Diego Pavia	26	2023
6	Chase Holbrook	25	2008
7	Ty Houghtaling	20	1998
8	Sal Olivas	19	1967
	Tyler Rogers	19	2014
10	Charley Johnson	18	1959
	Andrew Manley	18	2012

Single game
Rk	Player	TDs	Year	Opponent
1	Sal Olivas	5	1967	Northern Arizona
	Sal Olivas	5	1967	New Mexico
	Joe Pisarcik	5	1971	West Texas State
	Cody Ledbetter	5	1995	Louisiana Tech
	Chase Holbrook	5	2008	UTEP

== Rushing ==
=== Rushing yards ===
Career
Rk	Player	Yards	Years
1	Denvis Manns	4,692	1995 1996 1997 1998
2	Larry Rose III	4,558	2014 2015 2016 2017
3	Ron “Po” James	3,885	1968 1969 1970 1971
4	Preacher Pilot	2,971	1961 1962 1963
5	Jim Bohl	2,858	1964 1965 1966
6	James Hebert	2,447	1981 1982 1983 1984
7	Jason Huntley	2,182	2016 2017 2018 2019
8	Joe Kelly	2,141	1955 1956 1957 1958
9	Kenton Keith	2,134	1998 1999 2000 2001
10	Kim Locklin	2,119	1981 1982 1983 1984

Single season
Rk	Player	Yards	Year
1	Larry Rose III	1,651	2015
2	Denvis Manns	1,469	1998
3	Bob Gaiters	1,338	1960
4	Ron “Po” James	1,291	1968
5	Preacher Pilot	1,278	1961
6	Preacher Pilot	1,247	1962
7	Jim Bohl	1,192	1965
8	Ron “Po” James	1,182	1969
9	Jim Bohl	1,148	1966
10	Chris Barnes	1,131	2000

Single game
Rk	Player	Yards	Year	Opponent
1	Preacher Pilot	319	1961	Hardin-Simmons
2	Preacher Pilot	262	1962	North Texas
3	Larry Rose III	260	2015	New Mexico
4	Ron “Po” James	256	1968	Wichita State
5	Jim Bohl	252	1965	Eastern New Mexico
6	Pervis Atkins	237	1959	New Mexico
7	Chris Barnes	233	2000	Tulsa
8	Larry Rose III	229	2014	Louisiana-Monroe
9	Jim Germany	228	1974	Drake
10	Denvis Manns	221	1997	Cal State Northridge

=== Rushing touchdowns ===
Career
Rk	Player	TDs	Years
1	Preacher Pilot	37	1961 1962 1963
2	Ron “Po” James	33	1968 1969 1970 1971
3	Bob Gaiters	31	1959 1960
4	Larry Rose III	27	2014 2015 2016
5	Jim Bohl	24	1964 1965 1966
6	Jim Germany	23	1972 1973 1974
	Denvis Manns	23	1995 1996 1997 1998
8	Kim Locklin	20	1981 1982 1983 1984
	Paul Dombrowski	20	2002 2003 2004 2005
10	Pervis Atkins	19	1958 1959 1960

Single season
Rk	Player	TDs	Year
1	Bob Gaiters	23	1960
2	Preacher Pilot	20	1961
3	Preacher Pilot	15	1962
4	Pervis Atkins	14	1959
	Jim Germany	14	1974
	Larry Rose III	14	2015
7	Jim Bohl	13	1966
8	Ron “Po” James	12	1968
9	Lawrence Truehill	11	1992
	Kenton Keith	11	2001

Single game
Rk	Player	TDs	Year	Opponent
1	Robert Foster	7	1917	New Mexico

== Receiving ==
=== Receptions ===
Career
Rk	Player	Rec	Years
1	A. J. Harris	269	2005 2006 2007 2008
2	Chris Williams	246	2005 2006 2007 2008
3	OJ Clark	200	2016 2017 2018
4	Duane Gregory	181	1994 1995 1996 1997
5	Austin Franklin	160	2011 2012 2013
6	Ryan Shaw	153	1996 1997 1998 1999
7	Lucious Davis	147	1992 1993 1994 1995
8	Derek Dubois	136	2005 2006 2007
9	Jason Huntley	134	2016 2017 2018 2019
10	Brandon Allen	132	2004 2005 2006 2007

Single season
Rk	Player	Rec	Year
1	Chris Williams	92	2006
2	Chris Williams	86	2008
3	A. J. Harris	81	2007
4	Paul Dombrowski	78	2005
	A. J. Harris	78	2008
6	Jaleel Scott	76	2017
7	Teldrick Morgan	75	2014
8	Austin Franklin	74	2012
9	A. J. Harris	71	2006
10	Duane Gregory	68	1996

Single game
Rk	Player	Rec	Year	Opponent
1	Paul Dombrowski	16	2005	San Jose State
2	Jeff Evans	15	1978	Southern Illinois
3	Duane Gregory	13	1996	Idaho
	Chris Williams	13	2006	Boise State
	Austin Franklin	13	2013	Louisiana-Lafayette
6	Ryan Shaw	12	1998	Idaho
	Chris Williams	12	2006	Louisiana Tech
	A. J. Harris	12	2007	Utah State
	Chris Williams	12	2008	San Jose State

=== Receiving yards ===
Career
Rk	Player	Yards	Years
1	Chris Williams	3,555	2005 2006 2007 2008
2	Lucious Davis	2,769	1992 1993 1994 1995
3	Duane Gregory	2,641	1994 1995 1996 1997
4	A. J. Harris	2,561	2005 2006 2007 2008
5	Austin Franklin	2,439	2011 2012 2013
6	Ryan Shaw	2,315	1996 1997 1998 1999
7	Derek Dubois	1,881	2005 2006 2007
8	OJ Clark	1,807	2016 2017 2018 2019
9	Alvin Warren	1,780	1987 1988 1989 1990
10	P. J. Winston	1,724	1999 2000 2001 2002

Single season
Rk	Player	Yards	Year
1	Chris Williams	1,425	2006
2	Chris Williams	1,271	2008
3	Austin Franklin	1,245	2012
4	Hank Cook	1,111	1973
5	Jaleel Scott	1,079	2017
6	Taveon Rogers	1,048	2011
7	Lucious Davis	1,018	1995
8	Lucious Davis	985	1994
9	Taveon Rogers	975	2011
10	Ronshay Jenkins	928	2003

Single game
Rk	Player	Yards	Year	Opponent
1	Jeff Evans	310	1978	Southern Illinois
2	Ryan Shaw	240	1998	Boise State
3	Austin Franklin	236	2012	Sacramento State
4	Chris Williams	221	2007	UTEP
	Chris Williams	221	2008	Hawaii
6	Tyrian Taylor	206	2015	Georgia State
7	Taveon Rogers	203	2011	Nevada
8	Lucious Davis	202	1993	UNLV
	Teldrick Morgan	202	2014	UTEP
10	Ronshay Jenkins	200	2003	New Mexico

=== Receiving touchdowns ===
Career
Rk	Player	TDs	Years
1	Chris Williams	32	2005 2006 2007 2008
2	Lucious Davis	31	1992 1993 1994 1995
3	Ryan Shaw	22	1996 1997 1998 1999
4	Austin Franklin	19	2011 2012 2013
5	A. J. Harris	16	2005 2006 2007 2008
6	Mike Carroll	15	1965 1966 1967
7	Duane Gregory	14	1994 1995 1996 1997
	David Patterson	14	1995 1996 1997 1998
	Derek Dubois	14	2005 2006 2007
	Jaleel Scott	14	2016 2017

Single season
Rk	Player	TDs	Year
1	Ryan Shaw	13	1998
2	Lucious Davis	12	1995
	Chris Williams	12	2006
4	Lucious Davis	11	1994
	Chris Williams	11	2007
6	Trent Hudson	10	2023
7	Mike Carroll	9	1966
	Chris Williams	9	2008
	Marcus Anderson	9	2008
	Taveon Rogers	9	2011
	Austin Franklin	9	2012

Single game
Rk	Player	TDs	Year	Opponent
1	Lucious Davis	4	1993	UNLV

== Total offense ==
Total offense is the sum of passing and rushing statistics. It does not include receiving or returns.

=== Total offense yards ===
Career
Rk	Player	Yards	Years
1	Chase Holbrook	11,557	2006 2007 2008
2	Cody Ledbetter	8,207	1991 1993 1994 1995
3	Tyler Rogers	6,955	2014 2015 2016
4	K. C. Enzminger	6,776	1998 1999 2000 2001
5	Diego Pavia	5,854	2022 2023
6	Buck Pierce	5,661	2001 2002 2003 2004
7	Joe Pisarcik	5,582	1971 1972 1973
8	Tyler Adkins	5,309	2018 2019
9	Jamie McAlister	4,890	1979 1980 1981 1982
10	Ty Houghtaling	4,778	1996 1997 1998 1999

Single season
Rk	Player	Yards	Year
1	Chase Holbrook	4,541	2006
2	Diego Pavia	3,896	2023
3	Chase Holbrook	3,871	2007
4	Cody Ledbetter	3,724	1995
5	Tyler Rogers	3,206	2016
6	Chase Holbrook	3,165	2008
7	Tyler Rogers	2,979	2014
8	Jonah Johnson	2,871	2021
9	David Spriggs	2,802	1978
10	Andrew McDonald	2,753	2013

Single game
Rk	Player	Yards	Year	Opponent
1	Cody Ledbetter	559	1995	UNLV
2	Chase Holbrook	518	2006	Louisiana Tech
3	Chase Holbrook	517	2006	Boise State
4	David Spriggs	510	1978	Southern Illinois
5	Chase Holbrook	482	2006	UTEP
6	Tyler Rogers	470	2016	Troy
7	Matt Christian	467	2011	Nevada
8	Chase Holbrook	463	2007	New Mexico
9	Chase Holbrook	453	2006	New Mexico
10	Jonah Johnson	450	2021	UMass

=== Touchdowns responsible for ===
"Touchdowns responsible for" is the NCAA's official term for combined passing and rushing touchdowns.

Career
Rk	Player	TDs	Years
1	Chase Holbrook	93	2006 2007 2008
2	Cody Ledbetter	68	1991 1993 1994 1995
3	K. C. Enzminger	55	1998 1999 2000 2001
4	Diego Pavia	52	2022 2023
5	Sal Olivas	49	1964 1965 1966 1967
	Tyler Rogers	49	2014 2015 2016
7	Buck Pierce	44	2001 2002 2003 2004
8	Charley Johnson	43	1958 1959 1960
9	Jamie McAlister	40	1979 1980 1981 1982
10	Preacher Pilot	37	1961 1962 1963
	Ty Houghtaling	37	1996 1997 1998 1999

Single season
Rk	Player	TDs	Year
1	Chase Holbrook	38	2006
2	Diego Pavia	33	2023
3	Cody Ledbetter	32	1995
4	Chase Holbrook	28	2007
5	Chase Holbrook	27	2008
6	Bob Gaiters	23	1960
7	Sal Olivas	22	1967
	K. C. Enzminger	22	1999
9	Preacher Pilot	21	1961
	Ty Houghtaling	21	1998
	Tyler Rogers	21	2014

Single game
Rk	Player	TDs	Year	Opponent
1	Robert Foster	7	1917	New Mexico

== Defense ==
=== Interceptions ===
Career
Rk	Player	Ints	Years
1	Hartwell Menefee	16	1961 1964 1965
	Abelardo Alba	16	1965 1966 1967
3	Kelly Olive	15	1965 1966 1967 1968
4	Tommy Feezel	14	1964 1965 1966
5	Jascon Willis	12	1997 1998 1999 2000
6	James Ferebee	11	1978 1979 1980 1981
	Calvin Henry	11	1983 1984 1985 1987
	Davon House	11	2007 2008 2009 2010
	Jaden Wright	11	2014 2015 2016 2017
10	Donald Stowers	10	1990 1991 1992 1993

Single season
Rk	Player	Ints	Year
1	Abelardo Alba	8	1966
	Jim Miller	8	1985
3	Tommy Feezel	6	1965
	Hartwell Menefee	6	1965
	Kelly Olive	6	1966
	Loy Hayes	6	1967
	Donyae Coleman	6	2011

Single game
Rk	Player	Ints	Year	Opponent
1	Abelardo Alba	3	1966	Wichita State
	Abelardo Alba	3	1967	New Mexico
	Rory Palmore	3	1977	UTEP
	Donald Stowers	3	1992	UNLV

=== Tackles ===
Career
Rk	Player	Tackles	Years
1	Darryl Ford	511	1984 1985 1986 1988
2	Sam Dickey	473	1986 1987 1988 1989
3	Jim Cottrell	463	2002 2003 2004 2005
4	Fredd Young	393	1980 1981 1982 1983
5	Dalton Harrington	391	2014 2015 2016 2017
6	Leo Barker	378	1979 1980 1981 1982 1983
	Rodney Butler	378	2013 2014 2015 2016
8	Bob Kinder	373	1983 1984 1985 1986
9	Dwayne Taylor	364	1998 1999 2000 2001
10	Cedric Walton	345	1992 1993 1994 1995

Single season
Rk	Player	Tackles	Year
1	Jim Cottrell	179	2005
2	Sam Dickey	169	1989
3	Steve Campbell	165	1991
	Rodney Butler	165	2016
5	Darryl Ford	164	1988
6	Tim Mauck	158	1993
7	Darryl Ford	154	1985
8	Mark Thompson	151	1976
9	Matt Griebel	149	2005
10	Sam Dickey	147	1988

Single game
Rk	Player	Tackles	Year	Opponent
1	Sam Dickey	26	1989	New Mexico

=== Sacks ===
Career
Rk	Player	Sacks	Years
1	Joe Campbell	26.0	1984 1985 1986 1987
2	Terry Shively	24.0	1972 1973 1974
3	Bill Stuersel	23.0	1987 1988 1989 1990
4	Cedric Wilcots II	19.5	2016 2017 2018 2019
5	Andre Anderson	16.0	1975 1976 1977

Single season
Rk	Player	Sacks	Year
1	Joe Campbell	19.0	1986
2	Terry Shively	16.0	1973
3	Bill Stuersel	13.0	1989
4	Fredd Young	12.0	1983
5	Kim Spears	11.0	1977

Single game
Rk	Player	Sacks	Year	Opponent
1	Fredd Young	6.0	1983	Louisiana Tech

== Kicking ==
=== Field goals made ===
Career
Rk	Player	FGs	Years
1	Dario Aguiniga	47	2000 2001 2002 2003
	Ethan Albertson	47	2020 2021 2022 2023
3	Dat Ly	40	1987 1988 1989 1990
4	Skip Vernon	39	1975 1976 1977 1978
5	Dylan Brown	33	2017 2018 2019
6	Andy Weiler	32	1983 1984 1985
7	Bubba Culin	31	1992 1993 1994 1995
8	Nick Cecava	27	1996 1997 1998 1999
9	Tyler Stampler	25	2010 2011 2012
	Parker Davidson	25	2015 2016

Single season
Rk	Player	FGs	Year
1	Ethan Albertson	19	2023
2	Abraham Montano	18	2024
3	Dat Ly	17	1988
	Ethan Albertson	17	2021
5	Tyler Stampler	16	2010
	Ryan Hawk	16	2025
7	Parker Davidson	15	2016
8	Andy Weiler	14	1985
9	Nick Cecava	13	1998
	Dylan Brown	13	2019

Single game
Rk	Player	FGs	Year	Opponent
1	Dat Ly	5	1988	Kansas

=== Field goal percentage ===
Career
Rk	Player	FG%	Years
1	Ethan Albertson	78.3%	2020 2021 2022 2023
2	Abraham Montano	78.3%	2024
3	Ryan Hawk	72.7%	2025
4	Dat Ly	70.2%	1987 1988 1989 1990
5	Parker Davidson	69.4%	2015 2016
6	Nick Cecava	69.2%	1996 1997 1998 1999
7	Dylan Brown	68.8%	2017 2018 2019
8	Maxwell Johnson	65.4%	2012 2013 2014
9	Bubba Culin	62.0%	1992 1993 1994 1995
10	Dario Aguiniga	61.8%	2000 2001 2002 2003

Single season
Rk	Player	FG%	Year
1	Nick Cecava	92.9%	1998
2	Tyler Stampler	84.2%	2010
3	Maxwell Johnson	83.3%	2013
4	Dat Ly	81.0%	1988
5	Ethan Albertson	80.8%	2021
6	Ethan Albertson	79.2%	2023
7	Parker Davidson	78.9%	2016
8	Abraham Montano	78.3%	2024
9	Dat Ly	76.9%	1978
	Skip Vernon	76.9%	1990
