= List of New Mexico State Aggies in the NFL draft =

This is a list of New Mexico State Aggies football players in the NFL draft.

== Key ==
B	Back	K	Kicker	NT	Nose tackle
C	Center	LB	Linebacker	FB	Fullback
DB	Defensive back	P	Punter	HB	Halfback
DE	Defensive end	QB	Quarterback	WR	Wide receiver
DT	Defensive tackle	RB	Running back	G	Guard
E	End	T	Offensive tackle	TE	Tight end

== Selections ==
Year	Round	Pick	Overall	Player	Team	Position
1948	3	7	20	Jerry Nuzum	Pittsburgh Steelers	B
1954	26	3	304	Jesus Esparza	Baltimore Colts	T
1959	11	8	128	Joe Kelly	Los Angeles Rams	B
1960	3	6	30	Pervis Atkins	Los Angeles Rams	RB
1960	10	1	109	Charley Johnson	St. Louis Cardinals	QB
1961	1	1	1	Bob Gaiters	Denver Broncos	B
1961	2	3	17	Bob Gaiters	New York Giants	B
1961	15	7	203	E. A. Sims	Baltimore Colts	E
1961	19	4	256	Lou Zivkovich	Los Angeles Rams	T
1962	2	5	19	Bob Jackson	St. Louis Cardinals	RB
1963	5	9	65	Jim Pilot	San Francisco 49ers	B
1965	11	6	146	Willie Adams	Washington Redskins	G
1966	13	4	189	Jim Bohl	Philadelphia Eagles	RB
1966	17	14	259	Gene Modzelewski	Cleveland Browns	T
1967	7	19	178	Bob Crenshaw	Philadelphia Eagles	G
1968	4	13	96	Joe Schniesing	St. Louis Cardinals	LB
1968	7	9	174	Doug Dalton	Pittsburgh Steelers	RB
1968	14	16	370	Harold Gargus	Chicago Bears	DT
1969	4	18	96	Roy Gerela	Houston Oilers	P
1969	4	22	100	Ruby Jackson	Oakland Raiders	T
1969	7	6	162	Rick Hackley	Boston Patriots	T
1969	12	19	305	Howard Taylor	St. Louis Cardinals	RB
1969	14	18	356	Bill Ackman	San Diego Chargers	DT
1971	5	18	122	George Wells	San Francisco 49ers	LB
1972	4	14	92	Ron James	Philadelphia Eagles	RB
1972	6	9	139	Joey Jackson	New York Jets	DE
1972	14	6	344	Pat McTeer	St. Louis Cardinals	K
1973	4	15	93	Andy Dorris	Cleveland Browns	LB
1975	2	20	46	Jim Germany	St. Louis Cardinals	RB
1976	3	20	80	Duriel Harris	Miami Dolphins	WR
1976	10	14	279	Bill Bowerman	Detroit Lions	DB
1977	2	14	42	Walt Williams	Detroit Lions	DB
1977	5	16	128	Cliff Olander	San Diego Chargers	QB
1978	9	24	246	Andre Anderson	Los Angeles Rams	DE
1978	11	2	280	Ray Milo	Kansas City Chiefs	DB
1982	6	6	145	Kerry Locklin	Los Angeles Rams	TE
1982	11	20	299	Anthony Watson	San Diego Chargers	DB
1983	9	23	247	Bobby Humphery	New York Jets	WR
1984	3	20	76	Fredd Young	Seattle Seahawks	LB
1984	7	9	177	Leo Barker	Cincinnati Bengals	LB
1985	7	4	172	Kim Locklin	Cincinnati Bengals	RB
1985	12	14	322	Louis Garza	Cincinnati Bengals	T
1988	4	9	91	Joe Campbell	San Diego Chargers	DE
1991	10	27	277	Tony DeLorenzo	Buffalo Bills	G
1994	5	6	137	Aaron Laing	San Diego Chargers	TE
1995	6	6	177	Troy Sienkiewicz	San Diego Chargers	G
1996	7	30	239	Sean Manuel	San Francisco 49ers	TE
1996	7	45	254	Sam Manuel	San Francisco 49ers	LB
2001	5	30	161	Chris Barnes	Baltimore Ravens	RB
2003	7	32	246	Siddeeq Shabazz	Oakland Raiders	DB
2011	4	34	131	Davon House	Green Bay Packers	DB
2012	6	26	196	Jonte Green	Detroit Lions	DB
2013	7	2	208	Jeremy Harris	Jacksonville Jaguars	DB
2018	4	32	132	Jaleel Scott	Baltimore Ravens	WR
2020	5	26	172	Jason Huntley	Detroit Lions	RB
