= Hank Cook =

Former American football wide receiver

Profile
- Position: Wide receiver

Personal information
- Born: January 12, 1952 (age 74); Murfreesboro, Tennessee, U.S.
- Listed height: 6 ft 0 in (1.83 m)
- Listed weight: 182 lb (83 kg)

Career information
- High school: Cabrillo (Lompoc, California)
- College: Allan Hancock JC (1971); New Mexico State (1972–1973)

Awards and highlights
- Third-team All-American (1973)

Henry Gray Cook (born January 12, 1952) is an American former college football player who was a wide receiver for the New Mexico State Aggies. Despite being blind in his left eye, he set New Mexico State's career and single-season receiving records in 1973 and received third-team All-America honors from the Associated Press.

== Early life ==
The son of Aubrey Cook and Mary Cook, Henry "Hank" Gray Cook was born at Rutherford Hospital on January 12, 1952, in Murfreesboro, Tennessee. He grew up in Lompoc, California. Somewhere between age three and age five, he was blinded in his left eye in "a freak neighborhood accident". Cook and a cousin were throwing walnuts at each other, and one struck Cook's eye, detaching the retina. He attended Cabrillo High School where he graduated in 1970.

== College football ==
Cook played college football at Allan Hancock Junior College in Santa Maria, California. In 1971, he won all-league honors and led Hancock's football team to a conference championship.

Cook transferred after his sophomore year and played for the New Mexico State Aggies in 1972 and 1973. As a senior in 1973, he led the Missouri Valley Conference and ranked second nationally with 65 receptions and 1,111 receiving yards. During the 1973 season, he also broke New Mexico State career and season receiving records.

Cook accomplshed these feats despite being blind in one eye. Asked whether the blindness hampered his play, Cook responded: "I've learned to compensate for it over the years. I suppose I might turn my head a little more, one way or the other, but it really doesn't bother me."

At the end of the 1973 season, he became the second New Mexico State player to receive All-America honors, as he was selected by the Associated Press (AP) to its third team. Cook was also selected in December 1973 as New Mexico State's most valuable player.

== Later life ==
Cook was not selected in the 1974 NFL draft. In February 1974, Cook signed a one-year contract as a free agent with the Chicago Bears. The Bears placed Cook on waivers on September 13, two days before the team's first regular-season game.

Cook completed his degree at New Mexico State University in the summer of 1976, and was part of the 1977 graduating class. After his football career ended, he had a career in law, real estate development, and sports apparel.

== See also ==
- New Mexico State Aggies football statistical leaders
