= Chase Holbrook =

American football player and coach (born 1985)

Current position
- Title: Offensive Analyst
- Team: Colorado State Rams
- Conference: Mountain West

Biographical details
- Born: September 27, 1985 (age 41); Lubbock, Texas, U.S.

Playing career
- 2004: Southeastern Louisiana
- 2005–2008: New Mexico State
- Position: Quarterback

Coaching career (HC unless noted)
- 2009–2013: McMurry (RB/QB/OC)
- 2014: New Mexico Highlands (OC/QB)
- 2015: Tarleton State (PGC/QB)
- 2016: Washington State (OQC)
- 2017: New Mexico State (TE)
- 2018–2021: New Mexico State (QB)
- 2022–2024: Colorado State (Analyst)
- 2025: Colorado State (QB)
- 2026: Baylor (Director of Football Strategy)

Chase Andrew Cole Holbrook (born September 27, 1985) is an American football coach who is currently the director of football strategy for the Baylor Bears. He previously served as the quarterbacks coach at Colorado State. Holbrook played college football starting in 2004 as a backup quarterback for Southeastern Louisiana under Hal Mumme. Upon Mumme accepting the head coaching job at New Mexico State, Holbrook soon followed and spent his final three seasons as the starting quarterback for the Aggies.

== Early life ==
Holbrook attended L. D. Bell High School in Hurst, Texas. While at Bell, Holbrook was an option style quarterback. Due to his high school's offense, Holbrook was receiving scholarship offers from colleges that wanted him to play tight end.

== College career ==
Holbrook received offers from Missouri, TCU and Tulsa, but turned down their offers at a chance to be a quarterback at Southeastern Louisiana. Holbrook appeared in 10 games as a true freshman for the Lions, completing 7 of 9 passes from 75 yards, in Hal Mumme's pass friendly offense. Following the 2004 season, Mumme took the head coaching job at New Mexico State, and Holbrook followed him still wanting to play quarterback. Holbrook sat out the 2005 season due to NCAA transfer rules. Holbrook was named the starting quarterback for the Aggies the following fall. During his collegiate career Holbrook played a total of 44 games, completing 1,093 of 1,575 attempts for a total of 11,921 yards with 85 touchdowns and 41 interceptions. In his first year at NMSU he threw for 4,619 yards and had 4,541 yards of total offense, setting an NCAA single-season record. That same season he scored 34 touchdowns with only 9 interceptions, breaking many of the school's single-season records in the process.

=== College career statistics ===
Season	Passing							Rushing			
Season	Cmp	Att	Yds	Pct	TD	Int	QBR	Att	Yds	Avg	TD
Southeastern Louisiana Lions
2004	7	9	75	77.8	0	0	147.7	2	3	1.5	0
New Mexico State Aggies
2005	Redshirted										
2006	396	566	4,619	70.0	34	9	155.2	80	−78	−1.0	4
2007	381	543	3,866	70.2	26	18	139.1	55	5	0.1	2
2008	309	457	3,361	67.6	25	14	141.3	81	−196	−2.4	2
Career	1,093	1,575	11,921	69.4	85	41	145.6	218	-266	-1.2	8

== Professional career ==
Holbrook received a tryout with the Dallas Cowboys after going undrafted in 2009.

== Coaching career ==
=== McMurry ===
In 2009, Holbrook followed coach Mumme to McMurry University, where he was named the running backs coach. After two seasons as the running backs coach, Holbrook was named quarterbacks coach in 2011. Holbrook added offensive coordinator to his duties in 2013.

=== New Mexico Highlands ===
Holbrook was named the offensive coordinator and quarterbacks coach at New Mexico Highlands University in 2014.

=== Tarleton State ===
In February 2015, Holbrook was hired as the passing game coordinator and quarterbacks coach for Tarleton State University.

=== Washington State ===
Holbrook spent the 2017 season as an offensive quality control coach on Mike Leach's staff at Washington State.

=== Return to New Mexico State ===
In 2018, Holbrook returned to New Mexico State as the tight ends coach on Doug Martin's staff. Prior to the 2019 season, Holbrook shifted to coaching quarterbacks, where he remained through the 2021 season.

=== Colorado State ===
In January 2022, Holbrook was announced as an offensive analyst at Colorado State working for head coach Jay Norvell.

=== Baylor ===
On March 10, 2026, Holbrook was tapped to serve as Baylor's director of football strategy under head coach Dave Aranda and offensive coordinator Jake Spavital.
