= 1996 Idaho Vandals football team =

American college football season

1996 Idaho Vandals football
- Conference: Big West Conference
- Record: 6–5 (3–2 Big West)
- Head coach: Chris Tormey (2nd season)
- Offensive coordinator: George Yarno (2nd season)
- Offensive scheme: Pro-style
- Defensive coordinator: Nick Holt (3rd season)
- Base defense: 4–3
- Home stadium: Kibbie Dome

1996 Big West Conference football standings
| | Conf. | | | Overall |
| Team | W | | L | W | | L |
|---|---|---|---|---|---|---|
| Nevada + | 4 | – | 1 | 9 | – | 3 |
| Utah State + | 4 | – | 1 | 6 | – | 5 |
| Idaho | 3 | – | 2 | 6 | – | 5 |
| North Texas | 3 | – | 2 | 5 | – | 6 |
| Boise State | 1 | – | 4 | 2 | – | 10 |
| New Mexico State | 0 | – | 5 | 1 | – | 10 |
+ – Conference co-champions

The 1996 Idaho Vandals football team represented the University of Idaho in the 1996 NCAA Division I-A football season. The Vandals, led by second-year head coach Chris Tormey, were members of the Big West Conference and played their home games at the Kibbie Dome, an indoor facility on campus in Moscow, Idaho. Idaho was 6–5 overall and 3–2 in conference play.

Idaho's home winning streak in the Kibbie Dome extended to seventeen games this season, winning all five home games, but they had only one road victory. That was over rival Boise State in the season finale in Boise, the fourteenth win over the Broncos in the last fifteen seasons.

With the move up to Division I-A this season, Idaho changed its uniforms' shade of gold from yellow to metallic.

== Schedule ==
| Date | Time | Opponent | Site | Result | Attendance | Source |
|---|---|---|---|---|---|---|
| August 31 | 12:07 pm | at Wyoming* | War Memorial Stadium; Laramie, WY | L 38–40 | 17,279 | |
| September 7 | 6:05 pm | at San Diego State* | Jack Murphy Stadium; San Diego, CA | L 21–40 | 29,449 | |
| September 14 | 3:00 pm | Saint Mary's* | Kibbie Dome; Moscow, ID | W 52–17 | 10,558 | |
| September 28 | 5:00 pm | at Southwest Texas State* | Bobcat Stadium; San Marcos, TX | L 21–27 | 7,047 | |
| October 5 | 3:05 pm | Cal Poly*^{†} | Kibbie Dome; Moscow, ID | W 38–33 | 14,579 | |
| October 19 | 12:05 pm | at Nevada | Kibbie Dome; Moscow, ID | W 24–15 | 11,042 | |
| October 26 | 1:05 pm | at Utah State | Romney Stadium; Logan, UT | L 28–35 | 13,712 | |
| November 2 | 3:05 pm | No. 20 (I-AA) Eastern Washington* | Kibbie Dome; Moscow, ID | W 37–27 | 10,107 | |
| November 9 | 3:05 pm | New Mexico State | Kibbie Dome; Moscow, ID | W 34–19 | 9,494 | |
| November 16 | 12:00 pm | at North Texas | Fouts Field; Denton, TX | L 17–24 | 7,000 | |
| November 23 | 12:30 pm | at Boise State | Bronco Stadium; Boise, ID (rivalry) | W 64–19 | 22,323 | |
*Non-conference game; ^{†}Homecoming; Rankings from The Sports Network Poll released prior to the game; All times are in Pacific time

== Roster ==
1996 Idaho Vandals football team roster
Players
Coaches
Offense

| Pos. | # | Name | Class |
|---|---|---|---|
| RB | | Willie Alderson | Fr |
| LB | 37 | Nick Alexakos | So |
| WR | 8 | Jerome Allen | Jr |
| WR | 24 | Kimiko Bandy | Sr |
| WR | 80 | Rocky Barlow | So |
| RB | | Vern Bernard | Fr |
| WR | 5 | Chad Berry | Jr |
| QB | 11 | Brian Brennan | Jr |
| OL | | Casey Campbell | Fr |
| TE | | William Cole | Fr |
| RB | 20 | Pierre Erick | Fr |
| QB | 12 | Ryan Fien | Sr |
| WR | 7 | Tom Gamelin | Sr |
| TE | 31 | Andy Gilroy | Sr |
| WR | 33 | David Griffin | Sr |
| OL | 62 | Robert Horbaczewski | Fr |
| RB | | Khalid Hurst | Fr |
| OL | | Mort Kelley | Fr |
| TE | | Ryan Lapointe | Jr |
| OL | | Jon Love | Fr |
| C | 67 | Nathan Lundquist | Fr |
| OT | 77 | Justin Meek | Jr |
| OL | | Brett Morton | Fr |
| TE | 84 | Jeff Pankratz | Jr |
| QB | 16 | Darick Pope | Fr |
| WR | 21 | Ryan Prestimonico | Fr |
| WR | 17 | Deon Price | Jr |
| TE | | Mike Roberg | Fr |
| WR | 4 | Robert Scott | So |
| OL | 72 | Jeff Senkevich | Fr |
| OL | | Ryan Schienle | Fr |
| OL | | Brian Smith | Fr |
| OL | 78 | Jason Stark | So |
| TE | | Travis Stombaugh | Fr |
| OT | 65 | Crosby Tajan | Jr |
| WR | | Jesse Taylor | Fr |
| RB | 32 | Jerome Thomas | So |
| RB | 1 | Joel Thomas | Jr |
| C | 76 | Bill Verdonk | Jr |
| RB | 19 | Ozzie Wallace | Sr |
| WR | | Linc Way | Fr |
| RB | 27 | Marcelle Williams | Jr |
| WR | 3 | Antonio Wilson | Jr |
| G | 69 | Dan Zeamer | Sr |
| OT | 71 | Steven Zenk | Sr |
| G | 60 | Richard Zenk | Sr |

Defense

| Pos. | # | Name | Class |
|---|---|---|---|
| DE | 92 | Eric Balzer | Fr |
| DL | | Kevin Bowman | Fr |
| DB | | Jaquwan Brackernridge | Fr |
| DT | 93 | Mike DeGraw | Sr |
| DL | | Rick Demulling | Fr |
| LB | 40 | James Durrough | Fr |
| DL | | Lani Emerson | Fr |
| LB | | Wayne Emerson | Fr |
| LB | | Jared Erickson | Fr |
| FS | 10 | Bryson Gardner | Fr |
| DB | | Dennis Gibbs | Fr |
| LB | | Bryan Grey | So |
| DB | 23 | Arnold Gunn | Jr |
| LB | 46 | John Harper | Jr |
| DB | | Bennie Herron | Jr |
| SS | 42 | Kevin Hill | So |
| LB | | Casey Hills | Fr |
| LB | 82 | Jeff James | Fr |
| DB | 2 | Tommy James | Sr |
| LB | 35 | Matt Jasik | Fr |
| DL | | James Johnson | Fr |
| DE | 99 | Matt Kramer | Fr |
| DT | 94 | John LaJeunesse | Jr |
| DB | 34 | Whitney Mayer | Jr |
| DB | | James McDaniel | Fr |
| CB | 14 | Ryan McGinnis | Jr |
| DE | 89 | Barry Mitchell | Sr |
| DE | 87 | Garner Moody | Jr |
| DE | 90 | Robert Mulder | Sr |
| LB | | Sidney Murphy | Fr |
| DB | | Tom Pace | Fr |
| DB | | Anthony Parson | Fr |
| DE | 96 | Ryan Phillips | Sr |
| DB | 28 | Tom Rayner | Jr |
| LB | 7 | Jevez Robinson | Fr |
| DB | | Chris Rogers | Fr |
| LB | 43 | Jason Shelt | Sr |
| LB | 44 | Ryan Skinner | So |
| DL | | Cade Smith | Fr |
| DE | | Ryan Smith | Sr |
| DE | 98 | Chad Stalder | Fr |
| DB | 49 | Tony Uranga | Jr |
| CB | 22 | Yaphet Warren | So |
| DB | | Jasper Williams | Jr |
| DT | 95 | Tim Wilson | Jr |
| DL | | Jake Wimer | Fr |

Special teams

| Pos. | # | Name | Class |
|---|---|---|---|
| P | 29 | Greg Debolt | Fr |
| K | 57 | Troy Scott | Jr |

Head coach

- Chris Tormey (2nd year)

Coordinators/assistant coaches

- George Yarno (OC)
- Nick Holt (DC)

Legend

- (C) Team captain
- (S) Suspended
- (I) Ineligible
- Injured
- Redshirt

Roster

== NFL draft ==
One Vandal senior was selected in the 1997 NFL draft, which lasted seven rounds (240 selections).

| Player | Position | Round | Overall | Franchise |
| Ryan Phillips | Linebacker | 3rd | 68 | New York Giants |
