= 2018 New Mexico State Aggies football team =

American college football season

2018 New Mexico State Aggies football
- Conference: Independent
- Record: 3–9
- Head coach: Doug Martin (6th season)
- Associate head coach: Oliver Soukup (2nd season)
- Offensive scheme: Air raid
- Defensive coordinator: Frank Spaziani (3rd season)
- Base defense: 3–3–5
- Home stadium: Aggie Memorial Stadium

2018 NCAA Division I FBS independents football records
	Conf.			Overall
Team	W		L	W		L
No. 5 Notre Dame ^		–		12	–	1
No. 19 Army		–		11	–	2
BYU		–		7	–	6
Liberty		–		6	–	6
UMass		–		4	–	8
New Mexico State		–		3	–	9
^ – College Football Playoff participant; Rankings from AP Poll

The 2018 New Mexico State Aggies football team represented New Mexico State University as an independent during the 2018 NCAA Division I FBS football season. Led by sixth-year head coach Doug Martin, the Aggies compiled a record of 3–9. New Mexico State played home games at Aggie Memorial Stadium in Las Cruces, New Mexico.

== Preseason ==
=== Award watch lists ===
Listed in the order that they were released

Award	Player	Position	Year
Butkus Award	Terrill Hanks	LB	JR
Paul Hornung Award	Jason Huntley	RB/KR	JR
Wuerffel Trophy	Jamin Smith	OL	SR
Earl Campbell Tyler Rose Award	Jason Huntley	RB	JR

== Schedule ==
Date	Time	Opponent	Site	TV	Result	Attendance
August 25	8:00 p.m.	Wyoming	Aggie Memorial Stadium; Las Cruces, NM	ESPN2	L 7–29	20,322
August 30	5:00 p.m.	at Minnesota	TCF Bank Stadium; Minneapolis, MN	BTN	L 10–48	41,291
September 8	6:00 p.m.	at Utah State	Maverik Stadium; Logan, UT	Stadium	L 13–60	18,223
September 15	6:00 p.m.	New Mexico	Aggie Memorial Stadium; Las Cruces, NM (Rio Grande Rivalry)	ELVN	L 25–42	20,673
September 22	5:30 p.m.	at UTEP	Sun Bowl; El Paso, TX (Battle of I-10)	ESPN3	W 27–20	19,412
October 6	6:00 p.m.	Liberty^{†}	Aggie Memorial Stadium; Las Cruces, NM	AV	W 49–41	8,337
October 13	3:00 p.m.	at Louisiana	Cajun Field; Lafayette, LA	ESPN+	L 38–66	18,131
October 20	2:00 p.m.	Georgia Southern	Aggie Memorial Stadium; Las Cruces, NM	AV	L 31–48	7,300
October 27	5:00 p.m.	at Texas State	Bobcat Stadium; San Marcos, TX	ESPN3	L 20–27	15,045
November 3	2:00 p.m.	Alcorn State	Aggie Memorial Stadium; Las Cruces, NM	AV	W 52–42	11,897
November 17	8:15 p.m.	at BYU	LaVell Edwards Stadium; Provo, UT	ESPN2	L 10–45	47,505
November 24	12:00 p.m.	at Liberty	Williams Stadium; Lynchburg, VA	ESPN3	L 21–28	16,022
^{†}Homecoming; All times are in Mountain time

== Game summaries ==
=== Wyoming ===
	1	2	3	4	Total
Cowboys	9	6	7	7	29
Aggies	0	0	0	7	7

Scoring summary

Quarter	Time	Drive			Team	Scoring information	Score	
Quarter	Time	Plays	Yards	TOP	Team	Scoring information	WYO	NMSU
1	6:34	9	60	4:37	WYO	Nico Evans 24-yard touchdown run, Cooper Rothe kick good	7	0
1	6:16				WYO	Jason Huntley rush for a loss of 2 yards, safety	9	0
2	11:49	13	49	6:27	WYO	36-yard field goal by Cooper Rothe	12	0
2	10:48	5	44	1:58	WYO	39-yard field goal by Cooper Rothe	15	0
3	7:13	1	56	0:12	WYO	Nico Evans 56-yard touchdown run, Cooper Rothe kick good	22	0
4	10:07	12	71	7:00	WYO	Jevon Bigelow 23-yard touchdown run, Cooper Rothe kick good	29	0
4	1:16	10	93	2:52	NMSU	Drew Dan 31-yard touchdown reception from Matt Romero, Dylan Brown kick good	29	7
"TOP" = time of possession. For other American football terms, see Glossary of American football.							29	7

=== At Minnesota ===
	1	2	3	4	Total
Aggies	7	3	0	0	10
Golden Gophers	7	28	3	10	48

=== At Utah State ===
	1	2	3	4	Total
NMSU Aggies	7	3	3	0	13
USU Aggies	16	17	14	13	60

=== New Mexico ===
	1	2	3	4	Total
Lobos	7	14	7	14	42
Aggies	17	0	0	8	25

=== At UTEP ===
	1	2	3	4	Total
Aggies	10	7	7	3	27
Miners	7	3	7	3	20

=== Liberty ===
	1	2	3	4	Total
Flames	7	7	14	13	41
Aggies	7	14	14	14	49

=== At Louisiana ===
	1	2	3	4	Total
Aggies	14	7	10	7	38
Ragin' Cajuns	28	17	7	14	66

=== Georgia Southern ===
	1	2	3	4	Total
Eagles	10	14	21	3	48
Aggies	14	3	7	7	31

=== At Texas State ===
	1	2	3	4	Total
Aggies	0	13	7	0	20
Bobcats	13	7	7	0	27

=== Alcorn State ===
	1	2	3	4	Total
Braves	7	7	7	21	42
Aggies	14	21	3	14	52

=== At BYU ===
	1	2	3	4	Total
Aggies	7	0	3	0	10
Cougars	7	24	7	7	45

=== At Liberty ===
	1	2	3	4	Total
Aggies	14	0	0	7	21
Flames	17	11	0	0	28
