= 1996 North Texas Mean Green football team =

American college football season

1996 North Texas Mean Green football
- Conference: Big West Conference
- Record: 5–6 (3–2 Big West)
- Head coach: Matt Simon (3rd season)
- Defensive coordinator: Fred Bleil (1st season)
- Home stadium: Fouts Field

1996 Big West Conference football standings
| | Conf. | | | Overall |
| Team | W | | L | W | | L |
|---|---|---|---|---|---|---|
| Nevada + | 4 | – | 1 | 9 | – | 3 |
| Utah State + | 4 | – | 1 | 6 | – | 5 |
| Idaho | 3 | – | 2 | 6 | – | 5 |
| North Texas | 3 | – | 2 | 5 | – | 6 |
| Boise State | 1 | – | 4 | 2 | – | 10 |
| New Mexico State | 0 | – | 5 | 1 | – | 10 |
+ – Conference co-champions

The 1996 North Texas Mean Green football team represented the University of North Texas in the 1996 NCAA Division I-A football season. The Mean Green played their home games at the Fouts Field in Denton, Texas, and competed in the Big West Conference. They were led by third-year head coach Matt Simon. The team finished the regular season with a 5–6 overall record with a 3–2 mark in Big West play.

The 1996 campaign marked the first time North Texas had been in a Division I-A conference since leaving the Missouri Valley Conference after the 1974 season. The Mean Green had competed as a Division I-A independent from 1975 to 1982, before dropping down to the Division I-AA Southland Conference from 1983 to 1994. North Texas spent the 1995 season as a transitional Division I-A member and competed as an independent.

== Schedule ==
| Date | Opponent | Site | Result | Attendance | Source |
|---|---|---|---|---|---|
| September 7 | Illinois State* | Fouts Field; Denton, TX | W 20–14 | 15,617 | |
| September 14 | at No. 18 Arizona State* | Sun Devil Stadium; Tempe, AZ | L 7–52 | 46,173 | |
| September 21 | at Texas A&M* | Kyle Field; College Station, TX | L 0–55 | 56,308 | |
| September 28 | vs. Army* | Texas Stadium; Irving, TX | L 10–27 | 20,413 | |
| October 5 | at Northern Illinois* | Huskie Stadium; DeKalb, IL | W 24–21 | 16,549 | |
| October 12 | Vanderbilt* | Fouts Field; Denton, TX | L 7–19 | 16,227 | |
| October 19 | New Mexico State | Fouts Field; Denton, TX | W 13–0 | | |
| October 26 | Nevada^{†} | Fouts Field; Denton, TX | L 13–40 | | |
| November 2 | at Utah State | Romney Stadium; Logan, UT | L 13–21 | 11,892 | |
| November 9 | at Boise State | Bronco Stadium; Boise, ID | W 30–27 | 18,119 | |
| November 16 | Idaho | Fouts Field; Denton, TX | W 24–17 | 7,000 | |
*Non-conference game; ^{†}Homecoming; Rankings from AP Poll released prior to the game

== Roster ==
1996 North Texas Mean Green football team roster
Players
Coaches
Offense

| Pos. | # | Name | Class |
|---|---|---|---|
| RB | 38 | James Allred | So |
| OL | 67 | Phil Armour | So |
| QB | 18 | Jason Attaway | So |
| RB | 35 | Starsky Banks | Fr |
| OL | 72 | Warren Barber | Fr |
| OL | 70 | Jayson Blaine | Sr |
| RB | 20 | Michael Boone | So |
| WR | 83 | Fred McKinney | Fr |
| RB | 31 | David Medina | So |
| QB | 14 | Jason Mills | Jr |
| OL | 62 | David Morgan | Fr |
| OL | 65 | Robert Waddle | Jr |

Defense

| Pos. | # | Name | Class |
|---|---|---|---|
| DE | 60 | Anthony Coleman | Sr |

Special teams

| Pos. | # | Name | Class |
|---|---|---|---|
| P | 19 | Toby Gowin | Sr |
| PK | 11 | Jeff Graham | Sr |

Head coach

Matt Simon

Coordinators/assistant coaches

Legend

- (C) Team captain
- (S) Suspended
- (I) Ineligible
- Injured
- Redshirt

Roster
