= Matt Simon (American football, born 1953) =

American football player and coach

Current position
- Title: Offensive coordinator
- Team: Alfred
- Conference: Empire 8

Biographical details
- Born: December 6, 1953 (age 72); Akron, Ohio, U.S.

Playing career
- 1972–1975: Eastern New Mexico
- Position: Linebacker

Coaching career (HC unless noted)
- 1977: Eastern New Mexico (GA)
- 1978: Borger HS (TX) (assistant)
- 1979–1981: UTEP (TE/LB)
- 1982–1991: Washington (RB/K)
- 1992–1993: New Mexico (OC/QB)
- 1994–1997: North Texas
- 1999–2005: Baltimore Ravens (RB)
- 2007–2008: San Diego Chargers (RB)
- 2009–2010: Gilmour Academy
- 2011–2016: Buffalo (RB)
- 2017–2018: Delaware (OC/QB)
- 2022–2023: Maryland (DQC)
- 2024–2025: Ohio Northern (OC/QB)
- 2026–present: Alfred (OC)

Head coaching record
- Overall: 18–26–1 (college)
- Tournaments: 0–1 (NCAA D-I-AA playoffs)

Accomplishments and honors

Championships
- 1 Southland (1994)

Matthew Simon (born December 6, 1953) is an American football coach and former player. He is the offensive coordinator for Alfred University, a position he has held since 2026. Simon has previously coached in the collegiate ranks, most notably as head coach at the University of North Texas from 1994 to 1997 and the offensive coordinator for the Delaware Fightin' Blue Hens football program, from 2017 to 2019. Simon is one of only ten football coaches to win both an NCAA Division I-A/FBS national championship (with Washington in 1991) and a Super Bowl (with the Baltimore Ravens in 2000).

Born in Akron, Ohio, Simon grew up in El Paso, Texas. He attended Burges High School where he was a three-sport standout in football, track and wrestling. He earned four letters as a linebacker for the Eastern New Mexico University Greyhounds and was later inducted into the ENMU Hall of Honors. Immediately following his playing career, Simon began his coaching career as a graduate assistant at his alma mater. After one year as an assistant at Borger High School, Simon coached the tight end and linebacker positions at the University of Texas at El Paso under head coach Bill Michael.

In 1982, he became running backs and placekickers coach at the University of Washington. The Huskies went to nine bowl games over a span of ten seasons. In 1991, the Huskies tied the Miami Hurricanes for the national championship. In 1997, Simon was inducted into the University of Washington's Hall of Fame. Simon left Washington in 1992 for the offensive coordinator position at New Mexico under head coach Dennis Franchione. The Lobos averaged 413 yards and 30.5 points per game during that span. They ranked 13th in the country in 1992 and improved to 8th the following year.

Simon succeeded Dennis Parker as head coach at North Texas in 1994, becoming only the 10th African American to lead a Division I-A football squad. In his first season, Simon guided North Texas to the Southland Conference Championship. He was named Southland Conference Coach of the Year, Black Coaches Association National Football Coach of the Year and AFCA Region 4 Coach of the Year. Simon resigned in January, 1998 because of scheduling differences with the athletic administration. Simon believed the proposed 1998 non conference schedule put too many North Texas football players at risk for injury.

After coaching at the Denver Broncos training camp and volunteering through the 1998–1999 season, Simon began his pro coaching career with the Baltimore Ravens. Under his guidance, Baltimore rushed for an average of 1,985 yards per season and defeated the New York Giants in Super Bowl XXXV following the 2000 NFL season. In 2004, the Ravens’ ground attack produced 2,063 total yards and ranked 9th in the NFL. It was Jamal Lewis's fourth 1,000-yard rushing season under Simon. Baltimore rushed for at least 2,000 yards in three different seasons under Simon, including a team-record 2,674 yards in 2003 when Jamal Lewis was named NFL Offensive Player of the Year, and Associated Press All-Pro and selected to the AFC Pro Bowl. In 2006, Matt Simon resigned from the Ravens to pursue other opportunities in the NFL because of uncertainties with former head coach Brian Billick's tenor with the team.

Simon's success with running backs continued during his time with the San Diego Chargers in the 2007–08 season. He helped lead LaDainian Tomlinson to his second NFL rushing title while coaching Pro Bowl Fullback, Lorenzo Neal and RB, Darren Sproles.

In 2011 Simon joined the coaching staff at the University at Buffalo, and served from 2011 to 2016. During his tenure at UB, Simon coached three All-Conference Running Backs and two All-Conference Punters and Kickers. One of those All-Conference running backs, Branden Oliver, broke James Starks' single season school rushing record at the University at Buffalo in 2011 with Simon as his coach. A team highlight came when Buffalo played in only their second bowl game in team history, when they played in the 2013 Famous Idaho Potato Bowl.

From 2017 to 2018, Simon served as the Offensive Coordinator/Quarterbacks Coach for the Delaware Fightin' Blue Hens. Delaware finished 7-4 both seasons, while the 2018 team qualified for the FCS Division I Playoffs.

Simon serves (2022-Current) as the Defensive Quality Control Coach for the Maryland Tarrapins, helping then win the 2022 Duke's Mayo Bowl, and the 2023 Music City Bowl.

== Head coaching record ==
Year	Team	Overall	Conference	Standing	Bowl/playoffs
North Texas Mean Green (Southland Conference) (1994)
1994	North Texas	7–4–1	5–0–1	1st	L NCAA Division I-AA First Round
North Texas Mean Green (NCAA Division I-A independent) (1995)
1995	North Texas	2–9			
North Texas Mean Green (Big West Conference) (1996–1997)
1996	North Texas	5–6	3–2	T–3rd	
1997	North Texas	4–7	2–3	T–4th	
North Texas:		18–26–1	10–5–1		
Total:		18–26–1			
National championship Conference title Conference division title or championship game berth
