= 1996 Nevada Wolf Pack football team =

American college football season

1996 Nevada Wolf Pack football

Big West co-champion Las Vegas bowl champion

Las Vegas Bowl, W 18–15 vs. Ball State
- Conference: Big West Conference
- Record: 9–3 (4–1 Big West)
- Head coach: Jeff Tisdel (1st season)
- Offensive coordinator: Steve Mooshagian (1st season)
- Offensive scheme: Pro-style
- Co-defensive coordinators: Ken Flajole (1st season); Ken Wilson (1st season)
- Base defense: 3–4
- Home stadium: Mackay Stadium

1996 Big West Conference football standings
	Conf.			Overall
Team	W		L	W		L
Nevada +	4	–	1	9	–	3
Utah State +	4	–	1	6	–	5
Idaho	3	–	2	6	–	5
North Texas	3	–	2	5	–	6
Boise State	1	–	4	2	–	10
New Mexico State	0	–	5	1	–	10
+ – Conference co-champions

The 1996 Nevada Wolf Pack football team represented the University of Nevada, Reno during the 1996 NCAA Division I-A football season. Nevada competed as a member of the Big West Conference (BWC). The Wolf Pack were led by first–year head coach Jeff Tisdel and played their home games at Mackay Stadium.

== Schedule ==
Date	Time	Opponent	Site	TV	Result	Attendance	Source
September 7	1:00 p.m.	at Oregon*	Autzen Stadium; Eugene, OR		L 30–44	41,606	
September 14		Montana State*	Mackay Stadium; Reno, NV		W 31–7	23,210	
September 21		at California*	California Memorial Stadium; Berkeley, CA		L 15–33	38,000	
September 28		Kent State*	Mackay Stadium; Reno, NV		W 63–42	24,430	
October 5		at UNLV*	Sam Boyd Stadium; Whitney, NV (Fremont Cannon)		W 54–17		
October 12		Boise State^{†}	Mackay Stadium; Reno, NV (rivalry)		W 66–28	25,330	
October 19	12:00 p.m.	at Idaho	Kibbie Dome; Moscow, ID		L 15–24	11,042	
October 26		at North Texas	Fouts Field; Denton, TX		W 40–13		
November 2		New Mexico State	Mackay Stadium; Reno, NV		W 63–14	22,815	
November 9		at Utah State	Romney Stadium; Logan, UT		W 54–27		
November 16		Arkansas State*	Mackay Stadium; Reno, NV		W 66–14	18,733	
December 19		vs. Ball State*	Sam Boyd Stadium; Whitney, NV (Las Vegas Bowl)	ESPN	W 18–15	10,118	
*Non-conference game; ^{†}Homecoming; All times are in Pacific time

== Roster ==
1996 Nevada Wolf Pack football team roster
Players
Coaches
Offense

Pos.	#	Name	Class
QB	11	John Dutton	Sr
WR	87	Trevor Insley	Fr

Defense

Pos.	#	Name	Class
DT	97	James Cannida	Jr
CB	31	Don Morgan	So
LB	30	DeShone Myles	Jr

Special teams

Pos.	#	Name	Class

Head coach

- Jeff Tisdel

Coordinators/assistant coaches

Legend

- (C) Team captain
- (S) Suspended
- (I) Ineligible
- Injured
- Redshirt

Roster
