= Preacher Pilot =

American football player (1941–1991)

Profile
- Position: Halfback

Personal information
- Born: January 22, 1941; Kleberg County, Texas, U.S.
- Died: January 2, 1991 (aged 49); Fort Wayne, Indiana, U.S.
- Listed height: 5 ft 11 in (1.80 m)
- Listed weight: 195 lb (88 kg)

Career information
- High school: Kingsville HS
- College: New Mexico State
- NFL draft: 1963: 5th round, 63rd overall pick
- AFL draft: 1963: 14th round, 112th overall pick

Career history
- 1964–1966: Indianapolis Warriors / Fort Wayne Warriors / Montreal Beavers
- 1966: Norfolk Neptunes

Awards and highlights
- NCAA rushing leader (1961, 1962); Second-team All-American (1962)

James Isaac "Preacher" Pilot Jr. (January 22, 1941 – January 2, 1991) was an American professional football player.

== Early life ==
Pilot was born in Kleberg County, Texas, in 1941. He grew up in Kingsville, Texas, and attended Kingsville High School.

== College career ==
Pilot enrolled at the University of Kansas on a basketball scholarship in 1959. After one year, he transferred to New Mexico State. He played for the New Mexico State Aggies football team from 1961 to 1963, playing tailback on offense and cornerback on defense.

As a sophomore during the 1961 season, Pilot led the country's major colleges in both rushing yards (1,278 yards) and scoring (138 points on 21 touchdowns). He was the third consecutive New Mexico State back to win the national rushing and scoring titles, following Pervis Atkins in 1959 and Bob Gaiters in 1960. He set a school record with 182 rushing yards against Texas Western on October 28 and then broke his own record three weeks later with 319 rushing yards on 40 carries (7.98 yards per carry) against Hardin–Simmons. He also scored 30 points on three touchdowns and six two-point conversions against Hardin–Simmons. His six successful runs for two-point conversions set a major college record, and his 319 yards was the most in one game in 13 years.

As a junior in 1962, Pilot again led college football with 1,247 rushing yards. He was the first player since Tom Harmon to lead the country in rushing yardage in consecutive years. He was not able to defend his national scoring title, finishing in a tie for second place with 92 points on 15 touchdowns and a two-point conversion in 1962. (Jerry Logan led the country with 110 points.) Pilot's two-year tally of 2,525 rushing yards was the third most recorded to that point by a major college player.

As a senior in 1963, pulled a hamstring muscle 10 days before the opening game and missed several games. When he returned to the lineup, he lacked the "quick start" that was a feature of his game the prior two seasons. He finished the 1963 season with only 446 rushing yards and 12 points scored.

== Professional football ==
Pilot was drafted by the San Francisco 49ers in the fifth round (65th overall pick) of the 1963 NFL draft. He instead signed with the Kansas City Chiefs of the American Football League, appeared in preseason games, but was released prior to the regular season. He played for the Indianapolis Warriors of the United Football League in 1964 and spent the next two years in the Atlantic Coast Football League with the Fort Wayne Warriors (1965), Montreal Beavers (1966), and Norfolk Neptunes (1966). He tallied 698 rushing yards for Indianapolis in 1964 and 622 yards for Fort Wayne in 1965.

== Later years and honors ==
Pilot died in 1991 at age 49 in Fort Wayne, Indiana. Pilot was posthumously inducted into the New Mexico State Athletics Hall of Fame in 1995.

== See also ==
- List of NCAA major college football yearly rushing leaders
- List of NCAA major college football yearly scoring leaders
