= 1996 Boise State Broncos football team =

American college football season

1996 Boise State Broncos football
- Conference: Big West Conference
- Record: 2–10 (1–4 Big West)
- Head coach: Pokey Allen (4th season; final 2 games); Tom Mason (interim, first 10 games)
- Defensive coordinator: Tom Mason (4th season)
- Home stadium: Bronco Stadium

1996 Big West Conference football standings
	Conf.			Overall
Team	W		L	W		L
Nevada +	4	–	1	9	–	3
Utah State +	4	–	1	6	–	5
Idaho	3	–	2	6	–	5
North Texas	3	–	2	5	–	6
Boise State	1	–	4	2	–	10
New Mexico State	0	–	5	1	–	10
+ – Conference co-champions

The 1996 Boise State Broncos football team represented Boise State University in the 1996 NCAA Division I-A football season, their first in Division I-A. The Broncos competed in the Big West Conference and played their home games on campus at Bronco Stadium in Boise, Idaho. Led by fourth-year head coach Pokey Allen and interim head coach Tom Mason, Boise State finished the season at 2–10 (1–4 in Big West, fifth).

Diagnosed with a rare and aggressive muscle cancer (rhabdomyosarcoma) shortly after the 1994 season, Allen underwent surgery in August 1996, then returned to coach the final two games of the season. While visiting relatives in Montana over the holidays, Allen's condition worsened and he died in Missoula on December 30.

== Schedule ==
Date	Time	Opponent	Site	Result	Attendance	Source
August 31	7:05 pm	Central Michigan*	Bronco Stadium; Boise, ID	L 21–42	19,258	
September 7	7:05 pm	Portland State*	Bronco Stadium; Boise, ID	W 33–22	19,445	
September 14	7:05 pm	Eastern Washington*	Bronco Stadium; Boise, ID	L 21–27	18,595	
September 21	11:05 pm	at Hawaii*	Aloha Stadium; Honolulu, HI	L 14–20	29,140	
September 28	7:05 pm	No. 22 (I-AA) Northwestern State*	Bronco Stadium; Boise, ID	L 16–20	18,893	
October 5	8:00 pm	at No. 5 Arizona State*	Sun Devil Stadium; Tempe, AZ	L 7–56	49,108	
October 12	2:05 pm	at Nevada	Mackay Stadium; Reno, NV (rivalry)	L 28–66	25,330	
October 19	7:05 pm	Utah State^{†}	Bronco Stadium; Boise, ID	L 14–39	18,168	
November 2	6:00 pm	at Fresno State*	Bulldog Stadium; Fresno, CA (rivalry)	L 7–41	36,099	
November 9	1:05 pm	North Texas	Bronco Stadium; Boise, ID	L 27–30	18,119	
November 16	1:30 pm	at New Mexico State	Aggie Memorial Stadium; Las Cruces, NM	W 33–32	4,153	
November 23	1:30 pm	Idaho	Bronco Stadium; Boise, ID (rivalry)	L 19–64	22,323	
*Non-conference game; ^{†}Homecoming; Rankings from AP Poll released prior to the game; All times are in Mountain time
