= 1996 New Mexico State Aggies football team =

American college football season

1996 New Mexico State Aggies football
- Conference: Big West Conference
- Record: 1–10 (0–5 Big West)
- Head coach: Jim Hess (7th season)
- Home stadium: Aggie Memorial Stadium

1996 Big West Conference football standings
	Conf.			Overall
Team	W		L	W		L
Nevada +	4	–	1	9	–	3
Utah State +	4	–	1	6	–	5
Idaho	3	–	2	6	–	5
North Texas	3	–	2	5	–	6
Boise State	1	–	4	2	–	10
New Mexico State	0	–	5	1	–	10
+ – Conference co-champions

The 1996 New Mexico State Aggies football team was an American football team that represented New Mexico State University in the Big West Conference during the 1996 NCAA Division I-A football season. In their seventh year under head coach Jim Hess, the Aggies compiled a 1–10 record. The team played its home games at Aggie Memorial Stadium in Las Cruces, New Mexico.

== Schedule ==
Date	Opponent	Site	Result	Attendance	Source
August 29	New Mexico*	Aggie Memorial Stadium; Las Cruces, NM (rivalry)	L 7–28		
September 7	at No. 8 Texas*	Darrell K Royal–Texas Memorial Stadium; Austin, TX	L 7–41	69,762	
September 14	at UTEP*	Sun Bowl; El Paso, TX (rivalry)	L 7–14	31,654	
September 21	Cal State Northridge*	Aggie Memorial Stadium; Las Cruces, NM	L 0–33	12,259	
September 28	at No. 17 LSU*	Tiger Stadium; Baton Rouge, LA	L 7–63	77,676	
October 12	Utah State	Aggie Memorial Stadium; Las Cruces, NM	L 21–53	7,839	
October 19	at North Texas	Fouts Field; Denton, TX	L 0–13		
October 26	Southern Utah*	Aggie Memorial Stadium; Las Cruces, NM	W 52–21		
November 2	at Nevada	Mackay Stadium; Reno, NV	L 14–63	22,815	
November 9	at Idaho	Kibbie Dome; Moscow, ID	L 19–34	9,494	
November 16	Boise State	Aggie Memorial Stadium; Las Cruces, NM	L 32–33	4,153	
*Non-conference game; Rankings from AP Poll released prior to the game
