= Jeff Tisdel =

American football player and coach (born 1956)

Biographical details
- Born: January 10, 1956 (age 70); Sacramento, California, U.S.

Playing career
- 1974–1977: Nevada
- Position: Quarterback

Coaching career (HC unless noted)
- 1978: Nevada (GA)
- 1980–1985: Christian Brothers HS (CA)
- 1986–1988: Saint Mary's (CA) (assistant)
- 1988: Nevada (assistant)
- 1989–1993: Sacramento City
- 1994–1995: Nevada (AHC)
- 1996–1999: Nevada
- 2000–2005: Sierra
- 2007–2012: Sierra

Head coaching record
- Overall: 23–22 (college); 121–48–1 (junior college)
- Bowls: 1–0 (college); 6–4 (junior college)

Accomplishments and honors

Championships
- 1 Camino Norte Conference (1989); 2 NCFL (1991–1992); 2 Big West Conference (1996–1997); 2 Bay Valley Conference (2002–2003); 1 Mid-Empire Conference (2004); 3 Valley Conference (2007–2009)

Jeffrey Michael Tisdel (born January 10, 1956) is an American former football coach. He served as the head football coach at the University of Nevada, Reno from 1996 to 1999, compiling a record of 23–22. Tisdel has two stints as the head football coach at Sierra College, a junior college in Rocklin, California, from 2000 to 2005 and from 2007 to 2012. His accomplishments include coaching the Nevada Wolf Pack in its first NCAA Division I-A bowl game victory, in the 1996 Las Vegas Bowl, and leading Sierra to a nation-leading 37-game winning streak between 2002 and 2005. Tisdel was also the first quarterback for Nevada to play in Division I-AA, moving up from Division II in 1978 and the first quarterback to play for Chris Ault, who became a member of the College Football Hall of Fame in 2002. After taking the 2006 season off, Tisdel returned to coaching his Sierra College team which ended the 2007 season ranked fifth in the nation by JCGridiron.com.

== Coaching career ==
Tisdel experienced his greatest successes at the junior college level, especially at Sierra College, where he brought a relative no-name program to national prominence at its level of competition by collecting three conference championships and, in his first year there, brought Sierra College to second place in the Bay Valley Conference. He also had success in his first head coaching position at Sacramento City College, where his teams won three Northern California Athletic League championships.

Tisdel's head coaching record at the college level was more mixed. In 1996, he was hired as the head football coach at the University of Nevada, Reno. His 1996 team compiled a 9–3 record, secured the Big West Conference title, and won the 1996 Las Vegas Bowl, Nevada's first victory in an NCAA Division I-A bowl game. Tisdel's subsequent Nevada teams were mediocre until, in the 1999 season, he coached Nevada to its worst record since 1975 at 3–8. Tisdel announced his resignation prior to the final game of the 1999 season. His successor, Chris Tormey, coached Nevada to an even more futile 2–10 record the next year, the program's worst record since Dick Trachok's 1–9 season in 1964, and was fired after the end of the 2003 season.

== Head coaching record ==
=== College ===
Year	Team	Overall	Conference	Standing	Bowl/playoffs
Nevada Wolf Pack (Big West Conference) (1996–1999)
1996	Nevada	9–3	4–1	T–1st	W Las Vegas
1997	Nevada	5–6	4–1	T–1st	
1998	Nevada	6–5	3–2	T–2nd	
1999	Nevada	3–8	2–4	6th	
Nevada:		23–22	13–8		
Total:		23–22			
National championship Conference title Conference division title or championship game berth

=== Junior college ===
Year	Team	Overall	Conference	Standing	Bowl/playoffs
Sacramento City Panthers (Camino Norte Conference) (1989)
1989	Sacramento City	8–3	4–1	T–1st	L Bay Bowl
Sacramento City Panthers (Northern California Football League) (1990)
1990	Sacramento City	4–5	3–3	T–4th	
1991	Sacramento City	8–2	5–1	T–1st	
1992	Sacramento City	10–0–1	6–0	1st	W Elks Bowl
1993	Sacramento City	8–2	4–2	3rd	
Sacramento City:		39–12–1	22–7		
Sierra Wolverines (Bay Valley Conference) (2000–2003)
2000	Sierra	5–5	3–2	T–2nd	
2001	Sierra	6–5	1–3	4th	L Capital Shrine Bowl
2002	Sierra	10–1	5–0	1st	W Capital Shrine Bowl
2003	Sierra	11–0	5–0	1st	W Capital Shrine Bowl
Sierra Wolverines (Mid-Empire Conference) (2004–2005)
2004	Sierra	11–0	5–0	1st	W Capital Shrine Bowl
2005	Sierra	9–2	3–2	3rd	W Holiday Bowl
Sierra Wolverines (Valley Conference) (2007–2012)
2007	Sierra	9–2	5–0	1st	L Hawaiian Punch Bowl
2008	Sierra	10–1	4–1	T–1st	W Premier West Bank Bowl
2009	Sierra	5–6	3–2	T–1st	L Premier West Bank Bowl
2010	Sierra	3–7	0–5	6th	
2011	Sierra	3–7	2–3	T–4th	
Sierra:		82–36	36–18		
Total:		121–48–1			
National championship Conference title Conference division title or championship game berth
