= Jim Bohl =

No. 13
- Position: Tailback

Personal information
- Born: October 13, 1942; Lompoc, California, U.S.
- Died: March 24, 2015 (aged 72); Atascadero, California, U.S.
- Listed height: 5 ft 10 in (1.78 m)
- Listed weight: 190 lb (86 kg)

Career information
- High school: Lompoc (CA)
- College: New Mexico State (1964–1966)

Career history
- Philadelphia Eagles (1967)*
- * Offseason or practice squad member only

Jim Winston Bohl (October 13, 1942 - March 24, 2015) was an American football tailback. He played college football for the New Mexico State Aggies from 1964 to 1966. He ranked third nationally in rushing yardage among major-college players for two consecutive years with 1,191 yards in 1965 (6.5 yards per average) and 1,148 yards in 1966 (5.3 yards per carry). He was also ranked second in scoring in 1966 (90 points) and 1967 (90 points). In three years of college football, Bohl tallied 2,858 rushing yards, 359 receiving yards, 374 passing yards, and 26 touchdowns.

Bohl was drafted by the Philadelphia Eagles in the 1966 NFL draft and by the Miami Dolphins in the redshirt portion of the 1967 NFL/AFL draft. He signed with the Eagles in December 1966 and played with the club in the 1967 preseason, but he was released before the season started.

Bohl later operated Baskin Robbins franchises for 37 years. Bohl was inducted into the New Mexico State Athletics Hall of Fame in 1995. Bohl died in March 2015 at age 72. He died in 2015 at age 72.

== See also ==
- New Mexico State Aggies football statistical leaders#Rushing
