= Austin Franklin =

American football player (born 1992)

No. 15, 16
- Position: Wide receiver

Personal information
- Born: December 6, 1992 (age 33); Dallas, Texas
- Listed height: 5 ft 11 in (1.80 m)
- Listed weight: 193 lb (88 kg)

Career information
- High school: Dallas (TX) Kimball
- College: New Mexico State
- NFL draft: 2014: undrafted

Career history
- St. Louis Rams (2014); Los Angeles Kiss (2015); Texas Stealth (2016); Wichita Falls Nighthawks (2016)

Awards and highlights
- First-team All-WAC (2012)

Career AFL statistics
- Receptions: 4
- Receiving yards: 36
- Receiving TDs: 2
- Tackles: 1
- Stats at ArenaFan.com
- Stats at Pro Football Reference

Austin Franklin (born December 6, 1992) is an American former football wide receiver. He played college football at New Mexico State University, and played for the St. Louis Rams in National Football League (NFL) as an undrafted free agent in 2014. Franklin later played in the Arena Football League (AFL) with the LA Kiss.

== Early life ==
Franklin was a two-sport star at Kimball High School in Dallas, playing football and basketball. He was named the Most Valuable Player of the 4A District 14 Dallas City League for basketball. Franklin was a member and starter of the 2011 4A UIL Basketball State Championship. During Franklin's football career, he played wildcat quarterback and wide receiver, and also returned punts and kickoffs.

== College career ==
Franklin played football for New Mexico State University after being recruited by Utah, Wyoming, Colorado State, New Mexico, Utah State and Vanderbilt. In his sophomore year in 2012, Franklin managed to accumulate 74 catches for 1,245 yards and was also first team all WAC selection. He was one of ten nominated as a Semifinalist for the 2012 Bilentnikoff Award. Franklin was also named an SI.com Honorable Mention All-American and became the 13th Aggie to earn All-American Honors. After sitting out 4 games due to grades he still managed 52 receptions for 670 receiving yards. Over his career he managed 160 receptions, 2,439 receiving yards and 19 touchdowns averaging 15.2 yards a carry. Franklin decided to skip his senior year to declare for the 2014 NFL Draft.

== Professional career ==
Pre-draft measurables
| Height | Weight | 40-yard dash | 10-yard split | 20-yard split | 20-yard shuttle | Three-cone drill | Vertical jump | Broad jump | Bench press |
|---|---|---|---|---|---|---|---|---|---|
| 5 ft 11 in (1.80 m) | 193 lb (88 kg) | 4.56 s | 1.58 s | 2.55 s | 4.28 s | 7.07 s | 36 in (0.91 m) | 10 ft 4 in (3.15 m) | 9 reps |
All values from Pro Day
