= Andrew Manley =

American football player and coach (born 1991)

Moanalua Menehune
- Title: Head coach

Personal information
- Born: May 22, 1991 (age 35); Wahiawa, Hawaii, U.S.
- Listed height: 6 ft 6 in (1.98 m)
- Listed weight: 265 lb (120 kg)

Career information
- High school: Wahiawa (HI) Leilehua
- College: New Mexico State (2010–2012); Eastern Illinois (2013–2014)
- NFL draft: 2015: undrafted

Career history

Playing
- Montreal Alouettes (2015)*
- * Offseason or practice squad member only

Coaching
- Kapolei HS (HI) (2016) Assistant offensive coordinator; Leilehua HS (HI) (2017–2022) Offensive coordinator; Moanalua HS (HI) (2023–present) Head coach

Head coaching record
- Career: 4–8–1 (.346)

Andrew Manley (born May 22, 1991) is an American high school football coach and former quarterback. He is the head football coach for Moanalua High School, a position he has held since 2023. He also coached for Kapolei High School and Leilehua High School. He played college football for New Mexico State and Eastern Illinois. He played professionally for the Montreal Alouettes of the Canadian Football League (CFL).

Manley began his coaching career as the assistant offensive coordinator for coach June Jones at Kapolei High School on Oahu for one season. He was named the head football coach at Moanalua High School in January 2023.

== Head coaching record ==
| Year | Team | Overall | Conference | Standing | Bowl/playoffs |
|---|---|---|---|---|---|
Moanalua Menehune () (2023–present)
| 2023 | Moanalua | 1–7–1 | 1–4–1 | 5th | |
| 2024 | Moanalua | 3–1 | 1–0 | | |
| Moanalua: | | 4–8–1 | 2–4–1 | | |
| Total: | | 4–8–1 | | | |
