= 1996 Las Vegas Bowl =

- 5th Las Vegas Bowl
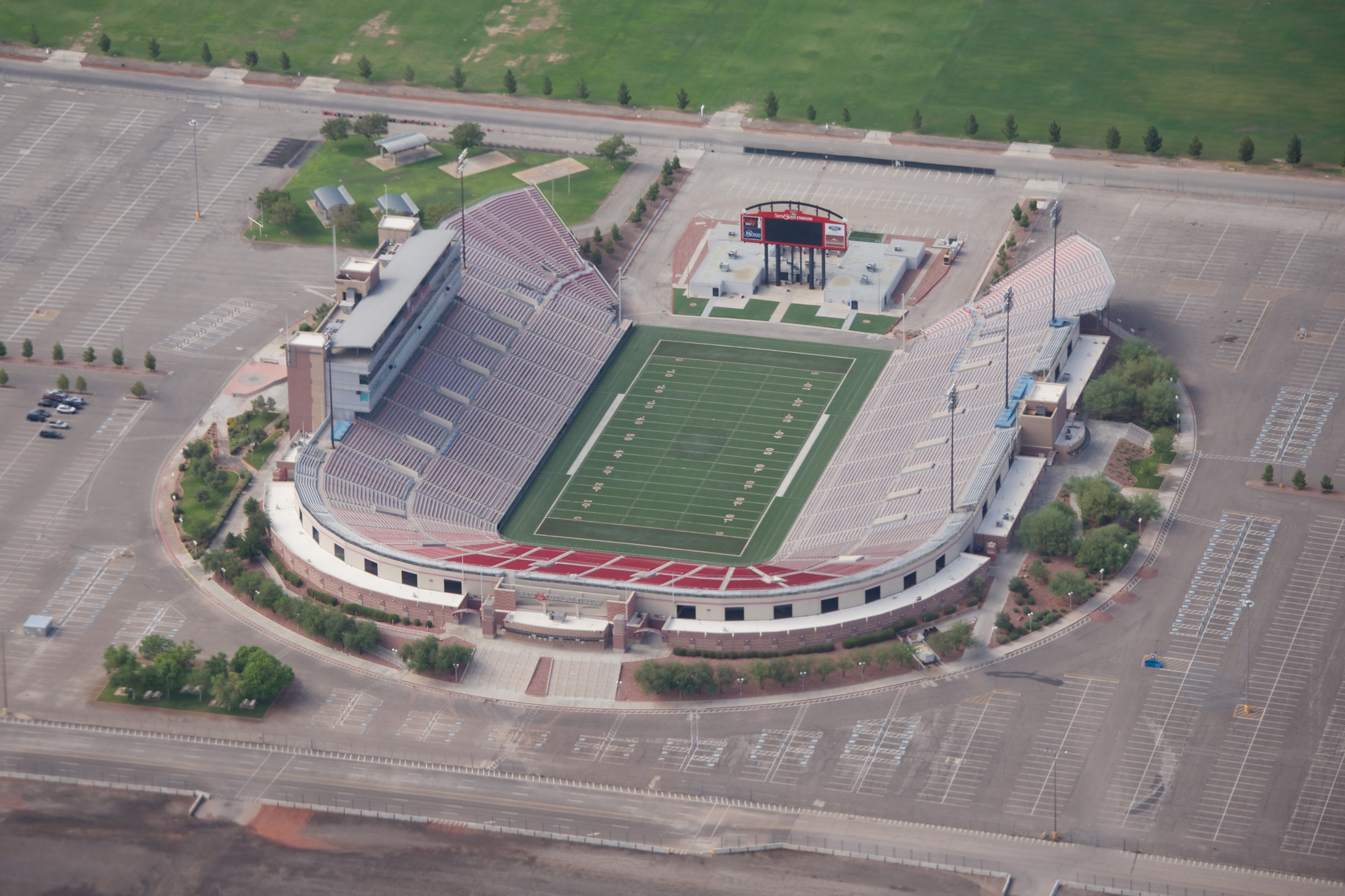
- Sam Boyd Stadium in Whitney, Nevada, hosted the Las Vegas Bowl.
Nevada Wolf Pack	Ball State Cardinals
(8–3)	(8–3)
Big West	MAC
18	15
Head coach: Jeff Tisdel	Head coach: Bill Lynch
	1	2	3	4	Total
Nevada	9	3	0	6	18
Ball State	0	7	0	8	15
- Date: December 19, 1996
- Season: 1996
- Stadium: Sam Boyd Stadium
- Location: Whitney, Nevada
- MVP: Mike Crawford
- Payout: US$150,000 per team

The 1996 Las Vegas Bowl was the fifth edition of the annual college football bowl game. It featured the Nevada Wolf Pack, the champions of the Big West Conference, and the Ball State Cardinals, the champions of the Mid-American Conference.

This bowl was the last to feature the Big West and MAC champions as automatic qualifiers, ending a tradition that had begun in 1981, when the California Bowl was founded. Two additional bowls were added to accommodate the conferences, with the Big West champion receiving an automatic berth in the Humanitarian Bowl in Boise and the MAC champion receiving an automatic berth in the Motor City Bowl in Detroit.

== Game summary ==
Nevada scored first following a 16-yard touchdown pass from quarterback John Dutton to Damond Wilkins, but the extra point attempt failed leaving the score 6–0 Nevada. Damon Shea made up for his missed extra point by kicking a 22-yard field goal making it 9–0 Nevada in the first quarter.

In the second quarter, LeAndre Moore rushed 62 yards for a touchdown for Ball State, to cut the lead to 9–7. Damon Shea's 33-yard field goal attempt with 44 seconds left in the first half made the halftime score 12–7, Nevada. The teams would go scoreless in the third quarter.

In the fourth quarter, Eric Bennett threw an 11-yard touchdown pass to Damond Wilkins, but the ensuing two-point conversion attempt failed, making the score 18–7 Nevada. Brent Baldwin threw a 27-yard touchdown pass to Adrian Reese, and the two-point conversion attempt was successful leaving the score 18–15 Nevada. Nevada ran out the clock on its next possession.

Nevada linebacker Mike Crawford was named MVP due to his 14 tackles, one forced fumble and an interception.
