= 1996 Utah State Aggies football team =

American college football season

1996 Utah State Aggies football

Big West co-champion
- Conference: Big West Conference
- Record: 6–5 (4–1 Big West)
- Head coach: John L. Smith (2nd season)
- Offensive coordinator: Bobby Petrino (2nd season)
- Defensive coordinator: Chris Smeland (2nd season)
- Home stadium: Romney Stadium

1996 Big West Conference football standings
	Conf.			Overall
Team	W		L	W		L
Nevada +	4	–	1	9	–	3
Utah State +	4	–	1	6	–	5
Idaho	3	–	2	6	–	5
North Texas	3	–	2	5	–	6
Boise State	1	–	4	2	–	10
New Mexico State	0	–	5	1	–	10
+ – Conference co-champions

The 1996 Utah State Aggies football team represented Utah State University as a member of the Big West Conference the 1996 NCAA Division I-A football season. The Aggies were led by head coach John L. Smith in his second year in charge. The Aggies played their home games at Romney Stadium in Logan, Utah. Utah State finished with a 6–5 record and a share of the Big West championship, but was not invited to a bowl game.

== Schedule ==
Date	Opponent	Site	Result	Attendance	Source
August 31	Utah*	Romney Stadium; Logan, UT (Battle of the Brothers, Beehive Boot)	W 20–17	30,257	
September 7	Cal State Northridge*	Romney Stadium; Logan, UT	W 57–27	20,120	
September 14	at Southern Miss*	M. M. Roberts Stadium; Hattiesburg, MS	L 24–31	24,307	
September 21	at Oklahoma State*	Lewis Field; Stillwater, OK	L 17–31	37,000	
September 28	at Texas Tech*	Jones Stadium; Lubbock, TX	L 20–58	39,778	
October 4	No. 21 BYU*	Romney Stadium; Logan, UT (rivalry)	L 17–45	33,119	
October 12	at New Mexico State	Aggie Memorial Stadium; Las Cruces, NM	W 53–21	7,839	
October 19	at Boise State	Bronco Stadium; Boise, ID	W 39–14	18,168	
October 26	Idaho	Romney Stadium; Logan, UT	W 35–28	13,712	
November 2	North Texas	Romney Stadium; Logan, UT	W 21–13	11,892	
November 9	Nevada	Romney Stadium; Logan, UT	L 27–54	20,106	
*Non-conference game; Rankings from AP Poll released prior to the game

== Season summary ==
Utah State opened the season with back-to-back victories for the first time since the 1978 season as they defeated bitter rivals Utah and Division I-AA Cal State Northridge in a pair of home games. The victory over Utah was the first since 1987 when the Aggies had upset the Utes in Salt Lake City.

After an encouraging set of wins, the Aggies faced four difficult games in four weeks. They would fall in competitive road games to Southern Mississippi and Oklahoma State, before suffering less competitive losses on the road to Texas Tech and then at home to #21 BYU. The home game against BYU set the record for the largest crowd ever at Romney Stadium, with 33,119 spectators in attendance.

Moving into Big West play, the Aggies won each of their first four conference games by an average margin of 18 points. Having reached bowl eligibility, the Aggies hosted the Nevada Wolf Pack for a chance to win an outright Big West conference championship and secure a bowl berth. However, Nevada would win the game in Logan comfortably, beating the Aggies 54–27. The 1996 contest between the two teams constituted Nevada's fifth consecutive victory, a streak that would end the following year in Reno as the teams again played for a conference championship.

On offense, the Aggies built on the previous season's success under coordinator Bobby Petrino and incorporated a few new names alongside returning rushing leader Abu Wilson. Matt Sauk, a junior college transfer from Orange Coast College, stepped into a competitive quarterback room that included previous year starter Patrick Mullins. By the end of the season, Sauk had become the starter and threw for over 2,400 yards (including three 300+ passing yard performances). The 1996 season marks the most passing yards per game ever for an Aggie team (317.5). The top target for Sauk and Mullins in 1996 was Nakia Jenkins, who hauled in 82 receptions for 1,397 yards and 8 touchdowns.

Abu Wilson once again led the Aggies rushing attack, accumulating 840 yards and 16 touchdowns (a school record at the time). Wilson finished his career with 40 total rushing touchdowns, which remains a school record shared with Robert Turbin. Joining Wilson in the backfield was freshman Demario Brown, who would add 700 yards and 8 touchdowns. Brown would eventually become the leading rusher in Utah State history, and shares the record for most rushing attempts with Wilson. After the season, Abu Wilson was named to the Blue-Gray All-Star Game as acknowledgement for his record-setting career. Both Wilson and Brown were named to the All-Big West Conference team.

Defensively, the Aggies were led once again by senior linebacker David Gill. For the third consecutive year, Gill led the team in tackles (150 total, 16 shy of his 1995 mark). Gill would finish his Aggie career second all-time in tackles behind Del Lyles (1988–91), and still holds two of the top five spots for tackles in a season (1995 and 1996). He has since been surpassed by Bobby Wagner for all-time tackles, who finished tied with Lyles at 446. Other leaders for the Aggie defense in 1996 included Dwayne Nelson, Danilo Robinson, Ben Crosland, Spencer Waggoner, and Mike Hudson.

== Roster ==
1996 Utah State Aggies football team roster
Players			Coaches
Offense: Pos. / # / Name / Class	Defense: Pos. / # / Name / Class; FS / 3 / Johndale Carty / So	Special teams: Pos. / # / Name / Class; K / 19 / Micah Knorr / Sr	Head coach: John L. Smith; Coordinators/assistant coaches: Mike Cox (LB); Legend: (C) Team captain; (S) Suspended; (I) Ineligible; Injured; Redshirt; Roster

== Awards and honors ==
The Aggies had 16 players named to either the first or second all-conference team in the Big West.

Player	Position	Team
David Gill	LB	1ST
Nakia Jenkins	WR	1ST
Mauricio Jourdan	OL	1ST
Dwayne Nelson	CB	1ST
Abu Wilson	RB	2ND
Demario Brown	RB	2ND
Guillermo Chavez	TE	2ND
Mark Rommel	OL	2ND
Ken Watts	OL	2ND
Brandon Dyson	OL	2ND
Danilo Robinson	DL	2ND
Ben Crosland	DL	2ND
Spencer Waggonner	LB	2ND
Mike Hudson	S	2ND
Micah Knorr	PK	2ND
Nathan Morreale	P	2ND
