= 2013 Idaho Vandals football team =

American college football season

2013 Idaho Vandals football
- Conference: Independent
- Record: 1–11
- Head coach: Paul Petrino (1st season)
- Offensive coordinator: Kris Cinkovich (1st season)
- Offensive scheme: Multiple
- Defensive coordinator: Ronnie Lee (1st season)
- Base defense: 4–3
- Home stadium: Kibbie Dome

2013 NCAA Division I FBS independents football records
	Conf.			Overall
Team	W		L	W		L
No. 20 Notre Dame*		–		9	–	4
Navy		–		9	–	4
BYU		–		8	–	5
Army		–		3	–	9
New Mexico State		–		2	–	10
Idaho		–		1	–	11
*All wins for Notre Dame (9–4) in the 2013 season were later vacated; Rankings from AP Poll

The 2013 Idaho Vandals football team represented the University of Idaho in the 2013 NCAA Division I FBS football season. The Vandals were led by first year head coach Paul Petrino and played their home games at the Kibbie Dome. This was Idaho's first and only season as an independent. They became a football only member of the Sun Belt Conference in 2014.

== Schedule ==
Date	Time	Opponent	Site	TV	Result	Attendance
August 31	4:00 pm	at North Texas	Apogee Stadium; Denton, TX		L 6–40	21,975
September 7	1:00 pm	at Wyoming	War Memorial Stadium; Laramie, WY	RTNW	L 10–42	22,030
September 14	2:00 pm	Northern Illinois	Kibbie Dome; Moscow, ID		L 35–45	14,071
September 21	7:30 pm	at Washington State	Martin Stadium; Pullman, WA (Battle of the Palouse)	P12N	L 0–42	31,521
September 28	2:00 pm	Temple^{†}	Kibbie Dome; Moscow, ID	ALT	W 26–24	15,323
October 5	2:00 pm	No. 23 Fresno State	Kibbie Dome; Moscow, ID		L 14–61	14,747
October 12	4:00 pm	at Arkansas State	Liberty Bank Stadium; Jonesboro, AR		L 24–48	26,781
October 26	4:30 pm	at Ole Miss	Vaught–Hemingway Stadium; Oxford, MS	ESPN3	L 14–59	57,870
November 2	2:00 pm	Texas State	Kibbie Dome; Moscow, ID	ALT	L 21–37	15,088
November 9	2:00 pm	Old Dominion	Kibbie Dome; Moscow, ID		L 38–59	14,489
November 23	12:30 pm	at No. 2 Florida State	Doak Campbell Stadium; Tallahassee, FL	ESPNU	L 14–80	65,061
November 30	12:30 pm	at New Mexico State	Aggie Memorial Stadium; Las Cruces, NM	ALT	L 16–24	14,661
^{†}Homecoming; Rankings from AP Poll released prior to the game; All times are in Pacific time

== Game summaries ==
=== At North Texas ===
Idaho Vandals at North Texas Mean Green – Game summary

Quarter	1	2	3	4	Total
Vandals	6	0	0	0	6
Mean Green	14	12	7	7	40

at Apogee Stadium, Denton, Texas

- Date: August 31
- Game time: 6:00 p.m. CDT
- Game weather: Clear, 103 °F (39 °C)
- Game attendance: 21,975
- Referee: Jerry Banks
- TV: NTTV
- Box score

Game information
First quarter
- IDHO – Jake Manley 6-yard pass from Chad Chalich (kick blocked), 13:00. Vandals 6–0. Drive: 3 plays, 5 yards, 0:40.
- UNT – Brandin Byrd 1-yard run (Zach Olen kick), 8:05. Mean Green 7–6. Drive: 9 plays, 75 yards, 2:54.
- UNT – Brelan Chancellor 85-yard pass from Derek Thompson (Zach Olen kick), 5:17. Mean Green 14–6. Drive: 3 plays, 81 yards, 1:21.

Second quarter

- UNT – Mark Lewis 1-yard run (kick failed), 6:34. Mean Green 20–6. Drive: 15 plays, 49 yards, 6:13.
- UNT – Brandin Byrd 27-yard run (kick blocked), 2:46. Mean Green 26–6. Drive: 2 plays, 38 yards, 0:27.

Third quarter

- UNT – Reggie Pegram 2-yard run (Zach Paul kick), 3:28. Mean Green 33–6. Drive: 9 plays, 89 yards, 3:16.

Fourth quarter

- UNT – Darius Terrell 30-yard pass from Derek Thompson (Zach Paul kick), 11:17. Mean Green 40–6. Drive: 10 plays, 90 yards, 3:34.

Statistics	IDHO	UNT
First downs	14	27
Total yards	369	591
Rushing yards	139	187
Passing yards	230	404
Turnovers	3	2
Time of possession	28:41	31:19

Team	Category	Player	Statistics
Idaho	Passing	Chad Chalich	19/27, 230 yards, TD
Idaho	Rushing	Jerrel Brown	6 rushes, 70 yards
Idaho	Receiving	Dezmon Epps	8 receptions, 94 yards
North Texas	Passing	Derek Thompson	23/27, 349 yards, 2 TD
North Texas	Rushing	Brandin Byrd	7 rushes, 57 yards, 2 TD
North Texas	Receiving	Brelan Chancellor	6 receptions, 135 yards, TD

=== At Wyoming ===
	1	2	3	4	Total
Vandals	0	0	0	10	10
Cowboys	0	21	21	0	42

=== Northern Illinois ===
	1	2	3	4	Total
Huskies	7	14	14	10	45
Vandals	14	14	0	7	35

=== At Washington State ===
	1	2	3	4	Total
Vandals	0	0	0	0	0
Cougars	7	21	7	7	42

=== Temple ===
	1	2	3	4	Total
Owls	3	0	7	14	24
Vandals	7	10	3	6	26

=== Fresno State ===
	1	2	3	4	Total
#23 Bulldogs	28	19	7	7	61
Vandals	0	0	0	14	14

=== At Arkansas State ===
	1	2	3	4	Total
Vandals	7	0	10	7	24
Red Wolves	14	10	7	17	48

=== At Ole Miss ===
	1	2	3	4	Total
Vandals	0	7	7	0	14
Rebels	17	7	21	14	59

=== Texas State ===
	1	2	3	4	Total
Bobcats	7	16	7	7	37
Vandals	7	7	0	7	21

=== Old Dominion ===
	1	2	3	4	Total
Monarchs	17	14	14	14	59
Vandals	21	10	7	0	38

=== At Florida State ===
	1	2	3	4	Total
Vandals	0	7	0	7	14
Seminoles	21	21	17	21	80

=== At New Mexico State ===
	1	2	3	4	Total
Vandals	0	13	3	0	16
Aggies	7	3	7	7	24
