= 2013 New Mexico State Aggies football team =

American college football season

2013 New Mexico State Aggies football
- Conference: Independent
- Record: 2–10
- Head coach: Doug Martin (1st season)
- Offensive coordinator: Gregg Brandon (1st season)
- Offensive scheme: Air raid
- Defensive coordinator: David Elson (2nd season)
- Base defense: 3–4
- Home stadium: Aggie Memorial Stadium

2013 NCAA Division I FBS independents football records
	Conf.			Overall
Team	W		L	W		L
No. 20 Notre Dame*		–		9	–	4
Navy		–		9	–	4
BYU		–		8	–	5
Army		–		3	–	9
New Mexico State		–		2	–	10
Idaho		–		1	–	11
*All wins for Notre Dame (9–4) in the 2013 season were later vacated; Rankings from AP Poll

The 2013 New Mexico State Aggies football team represented New Mexico State University as an independent during the 2013 NCAA Division I FBS football season. Led by first-year head coach Doug Martin, the Aggies compiled a record of 2–10. New Mexico State played home games at Aggie Memorial Stadium in Las Cruces, New Mexico.

New Mexico State was a football-only member of the Sun Belt Conference from 2014 to 2017.

== Schedule ==
Date	Time	Opponent	Site	TV	Result	Attendance
August 31	6:00 pm	at No. 15 Texas	Darrell K Royal–Texas Memorial Stadium; Austin, TX	LHN	L 7–56	99,623
September 7	6:00 pm	Minnesota	Aggie Memorial Stadium; Las Cruces, NM	AV	L 21–44	16,418
September 14	6:00 pm	UTEP	Aggie Memorial Stadium; Las Cruces, NM (Battle of I-10)	AV	L 21–42	18,366
September 21	8:30 pm	at No. 13 UCLA	Rose Bowl; Pasadena, CA	P12N	L 13–59	58,263
September 28	6:00 pm	San Diego State	Aggie Memorial Stadium; Las Cruces, NM	AV	L 16–26	16,113
October 5	5:00 pm	at New Mexico	University Stadium; Albuquerque, NM (Rio Grande Rivalry)	RTRM	L 17–66	29,749
October 19	6:00 pm	Rice	Aggie Memorial Stadium; Las Cruces, NM	AV	L 19–45	16,164
October 26	6:00 pm	Abilene Christian^{†}	Aggie Memorial Stadium; Las Cruces, NM	AV	W 34–29	15,628
November 2	3:00 pm	at Louisiana–Lafayette	Cajun Field; Lafayette, LA	ESPN3	L 35–49	30,028
November 9	1:30 pm	Boston College	Aggie Memorial Stadium; Las Cruces, NM	AV	L 34–48	14,997
November 23	1:00 pm	at Florida Atlantic	FAU Stadium; Boca Raton, FL		L 55–10	12,253
November 30	1:30 pm	Idaho	Aggie Memorial Stadium; Las Cruces, NM	AV	W 24–16	14,661
^{†}Homecoming; Rankings from AP Poll released prior to the game; All times are in Mountain time

Aggie Vision affiliates, by game:

Minnesota- FCS Pacific [JIP], Comcast New Mexico, FS Arizona+, Altitude2, BTN2Go
UTEP- Comcast New Mexico, Altitude2, KASY
San Diego State- Comcast New Mexico, Altitude, FS Arizona+, KASY, KVIA, FS San Diego, ESPN3
Rice- Comcast New Mexico, Altitude [JIP], Comcast Houston+, KVIA, ESPN3
Abilene Christian- FCS Pacific [JIP], Comcast New Mexico, Altitude, FS Arizona+, KVIA, ESPN3
Boston College- Comcast New Mexico, Altitude2, FS Arizona+, Comcast Houston+, KASY, KVIA, ESPN3
Idaho- Comcast New Mexico, Altitude, Comcast Houston+, KASY, KVIA, ESPN3

== Game summaries ==
=== at No. 15 Texas ===
	1	2	3	4	Total
Aggies	0	7	0	0	7
No. 15 Longhorns	0	14	21	21	56

=== Minnesota ===
	1	2	3	4	Total
Golden Gophers	3	24	3	14	44
Aggies	0	7	7	7	21

=== UTEP ===
	1	2	3	4	Total
Miners	14	7	7	14	42
Aggies	14	0	7	0	21

=== at No. 13 UCLA ===
	1	2	3	4	Total
Aggies	0	0	0	13	13
No. 13 Bruins	7	24	14	14	59

=== San Diego State ===
	1	2	3	4	Total
Aztecs	0	5	6	15	26
Aggies	10	6	0	0	16

=== at New Mexico ===
	1	2	3	4	Total
Aggies	0	14	3	0	17
Lobos	21	21	10	14	66

=== Rice ===
	1	2	3	4	Total
Owls	21	7	7	10	45
Aggies	3	9	7	0	19

=== Abilene Christian ===
	1	2	3	4	Total
Wildcats	3	19	0	7	29
Aggies	7	14	0	13	34

=== at Louisiana–Lafayette ===
	1	2	3	4	Total
Aggies	21	7	0	7	35
Ragin' Cajuns	7	7	13	22	49

=== Boston College ===
	1	2	3	4	Total
Eagles	13	7	7	21	48
Aggies	3	14	7	10	34

=== at Florida Atlantic ===
	1	2	3	4	Total
Aggies	0	7	3	0	10
Owls	14	14	14	13	55

=== Idaho ===
	1	2	3	4	Total
Vandals	0	13	3	0	16
Aggies	7	3	7	7	24
