= Denvis Manns =

American football player (born 1976)

No. 33 – New Mexico State Aggies
- Position: Running back

Personal information
- Born: July 21, 1976

Career information
- High school: Lufkin
- College: New Mexico State

Awards and highlights
- 3x First-team All-Big West (1996-1998); Big West Co-Offensive Player of the Year (1998); Aggie Hall of Fame

Denvis Manns (born July 21, 1976) was the third ever NCAA running back to rush for 1,000 yards in four consecutive seasons after Tony Dorsett (University of Pittsburgh, 1973–1977) and Amos Lawrence (University of North Carolina, 1977–1980).

Manns graduated from Lufkin High School in 1995 where he rushed for 2,000 yards his senior year and led the Panthers to the 1994 5A quarterfinals. Manns’ number (#33) is the first (and currently the only) football number to ever be retired at Lufkin High School. He then played football for New Mexico State University 1995-1998 where he achieved his NCAA rushing record and still holds the school's career rushing record with 4,692 yards. Manns is one of only five players in NCAA Division I-A history to rush for at least 1,000 yards in four consecutive seasons.

== College ==
As a senior at New Mexico State University (in Las Cruces, NM) in 1998, Manns was the co-offensive Big West Conference MVP after rushing for a school record 1,469 yards. On Oct.31, 1998, Manns ran for 131 yards against Utah State to become just the third player in NCAA Division I-A history to surpass 1,000 yards in four consecutive seasons.

As a junior, Manns was a first team all-league pick after rushing for 1,017 yards despite missing a game due to injury and played hobbled in the final three games of the season. He ran for a career-high 221 yards in the Aggies’ 28–18 win over Cal State Northridge. It was his third 200-yard game of his career, setting a school record.

During his sophomore season, Manns put together his second 1,000-yard season by rushing for Big West Conference leading 1,086 yards. His most productive game was a 205-yard day in a 52–21 win over Southern Utah. He was a first team All-Big West Conference pick.

In his debut season as an Aggie, Manns concluded the season with 1,120 rushing yards and seven touchdowns. He had the most yards rushing for any true freshman in the nation, led all freshmen by averaging 153 all-purpose yards per game and set a Big West Conference record for rushing yards by a freshman.

Manns also set the Big West Conference record for average yards per carry at 7.1. He was the first player at NMSU to rush for over 1,000 yards in 21 years.

In 2005, at the age of 28, Manns was inducted into the Aggie Hall of Fame. In 2008, Manns will be inducted into the Aggie Ring of Honor, alongside fellow Aggie standouts Pervis Atkins and Walt Williams.

== Personal ==
In June 2002 Denvis and his longtime girlfriend Tamie welcomed their first daughter Maliyah Jenea. In September 2004 Denvis and Tamie were married in a small ceremony. In March 2005 the couple welcomed their second daughter, Marleigh Jade. The Manns family currently lives in Los Lunas, NM.

== Professional ==
Manns attended the Dallas Cowboys' training camp in both 1999 and 2001 as a free agent. He played in NFL Europa for the Barcelona Dragons in 2000 and the Frankfurt Galaxy in 2001. In 2005, Manns was inducted into the NMSU Athletics Hall of Fame. In 2002 Manns switched gears and began to teach and coach football as an assistant at Los Lunas High School. Five years later, in 2007, Manns became the interim head football coach at Los Lunas High School and this past season he was named the head football coach for the Los Lunas Tigers in Los Lunas, New Mexico. Manns is also the head track coach at Los Lunas High School. The Tigers did not go to the playoffs after Manns took over as head coach just prior to the start of the 2007–08 season, but he did lead the team to four wins, one more than the team had in 2006–07, including an exciting 30–27 overtime win over Rio Grande High School on Oct. 11, 2007.
