= Cody Ledbetter =

American gridiron football player (1973–2015)

No. 11
- Position: Quarterback

Personal information
- Born: July 9, 1973; Stephenville, Texas, U.S.
- Died: September 5, 2015 (aged 42); Aledo, Texas, U.S.
- Listed height: 6 ft 2 in (1.88 m)
- Listed weight: 205 lb (93 kg)

Career information
- High school: Stephenville (TX)
- College: New Mexico State
- NFL draft: 1996: undrafted

Career history
- Edmonton Eskimos (1996); Hamilton Tiger-Cats (1998–2001)

Awards and highlights
- Grey Cup champion (1999); NCAA total offense leader (1995)

Career CFL statistics
- Comp. / Att.: 94 / 208
- Passing yards: 1,245
- TD–INT: 7–10
- Rushing yards: 277
- Rushing TD: 1

Cody Ledbetter (July 9, 1973 – September 5, 2015) was an American football player. He played college football for the New Mexico State Aggies football team in 1991 and from 1993 to 1995. As a senior in 1995, he led all NCAA major college players in total offense yards (3,724), passing attempts (453), and interceptions (20).

Ledbetter later played in the Canadian Football League (CFL) as a backup quarterback for the Edmonton Eskimos in 1996 and the Hamilton Tiger-Cats from 1998 to 2001.

He fled from Texas back to Canada while on probation for having an improper relationship with a student while he was a teacher, and awaiting sentencing in a similar case. He was eventually extradited back to Texas in 2010 and sentenced to 12 years. He was paroled 18 months later and died on September 5, 2015, in a suicide in Aledo, Texas. He left behind his wife and two step-children.

== See also ==
- List of NCAA major college football yearly total offense leaders
