= Mike Roberg =

American football player (born 1977)

No. 89, 85
- Position: Tight end

Personal information
- Born: September 18, 1977 (age 49); Kent, Washington, U.S.
- Listed height: 6 ft 4 in (1.93 m)
- Listed weight: 263 lb (119 kg)

Career information
- High school: University (Spokane Valley, Washington)
- College: Idaho (1998-2000)
- NFL draft: 2001: 7th round, 227th overall pick

Career history
- Carolina Panthers (2001)*; Tampa Bay Buccaneers (2001); Indianapolis Colts (2002)
- * Offseason or practice squad member only

Career NFL statistics
- Receptions: 2
- Receiving yards: 17
- Touchdowns: 1
- Stats at Pro Football Reference

Michael Roberg (born September 18, 1977) is an American former professional football player who was a tight end in the National Football League (NFL). He played college football for the Idaho Vandals. He was selected by the Carolina Panthers in the seventh round of the 2001 NFL draft (227th overall). He did not play for the team. He played for the Tampa Bay Buccaneers and the Indianapolis Colts.
