= Joe Kelly (Canadian football) =

Canadian football player (1937–2022)

Profile
- Position: Halfback

Personal information
- Born: July 1, 1937
- Died: May 25, 2022 (aged 84)
- Listed height: 5 ft 11 in (1.80 m)
- Listed weight: 203 lb (92 kg)

Career information
- High school: Carlsbad (Carlsbad, New Mexico)
- College: New Mexico State
- NFL draft: 1959: 11th round, 128th overall pick

Career history
- 1959–1961: Ottawa Rough Riders

Awards and highlights
- Grey Cup champion (1960)

Joe Kelly Sr. (July 1, 1937 – May 25, 2022) was an American professional football player who played for the Ottawa Rough Riders. He won the Grey Cup with them in 1960. He played college football for the New Mexico State University.

Kelly died on May 25, 2022, at the age of 87. He is the father of Joe Kelly Jr., who played in the National Football Legue (NFL).
