= Po James =

American football player (born 1949)

No. 27, 33
- Position: Running back

Personal information
- Born: March 19, 1949 (age 77); New Brighton, Pennsylvania, U.S.
- Listed height: 6 ft 1 in (1.85 m)
- Listed weight: 202 lb (92 kg)

Career information
- College: New Mexico State
- NFL draft: 1972: 4th round, 92nd overall pick

Career history
- Philadelphia Eagles (1972–1975); Seattle Seahawks (1976)*
- * Offseason or practice squad member only

Career NFL statistics
- Rushing yards: 1,215
- Average: 3.7
- Rushing touchdowns: 4
- Receptions: 102
- Receiving yards: 747
- Receiving TDs: 2
- Stats at Pro Football Reference

Ronald "Po" James (born March 19, 1949) is an American former professional football player who was a running back for four seasons in the National Football League (NFL) for the Philadelphia Eagles from 1972–1975. He was selected by the Eagles in the fourth round of the 1972 NFL draft. He played college football for the New Mexico State Aggies.

== Early life ==
James attended New Brighton High School in New Brighton, Pennsylvania, where he lettered in football for three years. He started playing football during his sophomore year, rushing for 625 yards. He did not play as a junior, but as a senior, he rushed for 1,422 yards, along with 2,211 yards of total offense. He set the Beaver County scoring record for football with 200 points during his senior season, which stood for 22 years. He was a unanimous all-state selection during his senior season. He played in the Big 33 Football Classic as a senior in 1968.

James was inducted into the Beaver County Sports Hall of Fame in 1982. He was inducted into the Western Pennsylvania Interscholastic Athletic League (WPIAL) Hall of Fame in 2008.

== College career ==
James played college football at New Mexico State University. In his debut for the Aggies against Utah State, James rushed for 106 yards on 15 carries and had a 49-yard touchdown run. He rushed for over 100 yards in each of his first eight games during his freshman season, becoming the first freshman to do so. He ran for 185 yards against Lamar Tech. He rushed for 1,291 yards in his first season and earned honorable mention All-America honors. He set an NCAA freshman record for rushing yards with 1,291 yards, which was broken by Tony Dorsett in 1973. In his sophomore season, he ran for 1,182 yards.

== Professional career ==
=== Philadelphia Eagles ===
James was selected by the Philadelphia Eagles in the fourth round of the 1972 NFL draft. He led the Eagles in rushing as a rookie in 1972 with 565 rushing yards along with 20 receptions for 156 yards. He set a team rookie record for carries with 182. In 1975, he played in all 14 games and rushed for 196 yards on 43 carries and two touchdowns. He also had a team-best 4.6 yards per carry average. He caught 32 receptions for 267 yards and one touchdown. He returned 13 kickoffs for 311 yards and had a 23.9 average. He was waived on August 1, 1976 after the Eagles hired a new head coach, Dick Vermeil.

=== Seattle Seahawks ===
James was claimed off waivers from the Eagles by the Seattle Seahawks, which began its inaugural season in 1976. He was released prior to the start of the 1976 season.

== After football ==
After he was released from the Eagles, James became the director of the Baptist Children's Services. He also worked for the Mobil Chemical Company in Stratford, Connecticut.

== Shooting incident ==
James was shot six times on April 7, 1993, while in a sauna of the Bridgeport, Connecticut, YMCA, right after an argument following a pickup game of basketball. He was shot twice in the abdomen and four times in the legs.

== Personal ==
James' nickname, "Po", comes from the title character in the comic strip Pogo, Pogo Possum. When asked how he got the nickname, he would often joke "because growing up, that's what we were - po!" He now resides in Delaware, where he enjoys fishing and recording with different artist from Philly. Po has one daughter, Danielle, who lives in Delaware who he loves to spend time with and he also has a son Todd D. Land who currently resides in Virginia Beach, Virginia.
