= Doug Martin (American football coach) =

American football player and coach (born 1963)

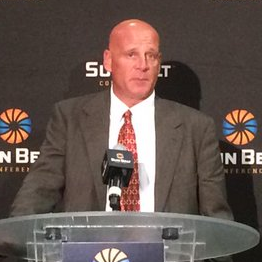
- Martin at the 2015 Sun Belt Media Day

Current position
- Title: Offensive coordinator & quarterbacks coach
- Team: Elon
- Conference: CAA

Biographical details
- Born: February 4, 1963 (age 63); Oak Ridge, Tennessee, U.S.

Playing career
- 1981–1984: Kentucky
- Position: Quarterback

Coaching career (HC unless noted)
- 1986–1987: Kentucky (GA)
- 1988: East Tennessee State (RB)
- 1989–1991: East Tennessee State (OC/QB/WR)
- 1992–1993: East Carolina (ST/TE)
- 1994–1995: East Carolina (WR)
- 1996–2002: East Carolina (OC/WR)
- 2003: Kent State (OC/QB)
- 2004–2010: Kent State
- 2011: New Mexico State (OC/QB)
- 2012: Boston College (OC/QB)
- 2013–2021: New Mexico State
- 2023: New Orleans Breakers (OC/WR)
- 2024: Memphis Showboats (OC/WR)
- 2025–present: Elon (OC/QB)

Head coaching record
- Overall: 54–127
- Bowls: 1–0

Douglas Franklin Martin (born February 4, 1963) is an American football coach and former quarterback. He is the offensive coordinator and quarterbacks coach for the Elon Phoenix, positions he has held since 2025. He was the head football coach for Kent State University from 2004 to 2010 and New Mexico State University from 2013 to 2021. He played college football at Kentucky for coach Fran Curci and Jerry Claiborne from 1981 to 1984.

== Coaching career ==
=== East Carolina ===
In 1992, Martin became an assistant coach at East Carolina University. He coached the Pirates tight ends and special teams his first two years and then took over the wide receivers. In 1996, he was promoted to offensive coordinator, a position he held until 2002.

=== Kent State ===
In 2004, Martin succeeded Dean Pees as head coach of the Kent State Golden Flashes football team. In his seven seasons in Kent, Martin had an overall record of 29–53. He resigned after the 2010 season finale win against Ohio University.

=== New Mexico State ===
Martin was announced as offensive coordinator and quarterbacks coach for the New Mexico State Aggies on March 9, 2011.

=== Boston College ===
Martin was named offensive coordinator and quarterbacks coach at Boston College by head coach Frank Spaziani on December 22, 2011.

=== Return to New Mexico State ===
In 2013, Martin was named head coach of the Aggies. In his first season, he led them to a 2-10 record, a one-game improvement from the previous year. He led them to the same record the following year. He led them to 3-9 records in 2015 and 2016. In 2017, he led them to a 6-6 record. This was the first time the Aggies were bowl eligible since 2002. The Aggies were invited to the 2017 Arizona Bowl, their first bowl game appearance since 1960. Of the 18 head coaches of the program over its history, he is only the eighth to have lasted five full seasons and the first in the 21st century. In 2017, Martin ended the 57-year bowl drought at NMSU by defeating Utah State at the Arizona Bowl. In 2021, Aggies athletic director Mario Moccia said after New Mexico State (2-10) ended its regular season by beating UMass that Martin's contract, which is set to expire after the season, would not be renewed.

=== Memphis Showboats ===
Martin became the Offensive Coordinator for the Memphis Showboats on January 4, 2024.

=== Elon ===
On December 20, 2024, Martin was named as the offensive coordinator for the Elon Phoenix.

== Head coaching record ==
Year	Team	Overall	Conference	Standing	Bowl/playoffs
Kent State Golden Flashes (Mid-American Conference) (2004–2010)
2004	Kent State	5–6	4–4	5th (East)	
2005	Kent State	1–10	0–8	6th (East)	
2006	Kent State	6–6	5–3	2nd (East)	
2007	Kent State	3–9	1–7	7th (East)	
2008	Kent State	4–8	3–5	T–4th (East)	
2009	Kent State	5–7	4–4	4th (East)	
2010	Kent State	5–7	4–4	4th (East)	
Kent State:		29–53	21–35		
New Mexico State Aggies (NCAA Division I FBS independent) (2013)
2013	New Mexico State	2–10			
New Mexico State Aggies (Sun Belt Conference) (2014–2017)
2014	New Mexico State	2–10	1–7	T–9th	
2015	New Mexico State	3–9	3–5	T–5th	
2016	New Mexico State	3–9	2–6	T–8th	
2017	New Mexico State	7–6	4–4	T–5th	W Arizona
New Mexico State Aggies (NCAA Division I FBS independent) (2018–2021)
2018	New Mexico State	3–9			
2019	New Mexico State	2–10			
2020	New Mexico State	1–1			
2021	New Mexico State	2–10			
New Mexico State:		25–74	10–22		
Total:		54–127			
