= Pervis Atkins =

American football player (1935–2017)

No. 27, 25, 39
- Positions: Return specialist, running back, wide receiver

Personal information
- Born: November 24, 1935; Ruston, Louisiana, U.S.
- Died: December 22, 2017 (aged 82); Los Angeles, California, U.S.
- Listed height: 6 ft 1 in (1.85 m)
- Listed weight: 195 lb (88 kg)

Career information
- High school: Oakland Tech (Oakland, California)
- College: New Mexico State
- NFL draft: 1960: 3rd round, 30th overall pick
- AFL draft: 1960: Second Selectionsth round

Career history
- Los Angeles Rams (1961–1963); Washington Redskins (1964–1965); Oakland Raiders (1965–1966)

Awards and highlights
- First-team All-American (1960)

Career NFL/AFL statistics
- Rushing yards: 201
- Rushing average: 2.7
- Receptions: 64
- Receiving yards: 675
- Return yards: 2,416
- Total touchdowns: 3
- Stats at Pro Football Reference
- College Football Hall of Fame

Pervis R. Atkins Jr. (November 24, 1935 – December 22, 2017) was an American football player and actor.

A collegiate star with New Mexico State University, Atkins still holds team records as a running back and punt returner for the Aggies' football squad. He later played professionally with the Los Angeles Rams and Washington Redskins of the National Football League and the Oakland Raiders of the American Football League, retiring after the 1966 AFL season.

In 2009, Atkins was elected to the College Football Hall of Fame.

== Early life ==
Atkins was born in Ruston, Louisiana, and raised in Oakland, California. He graduated from Oakland Technical High School in 1953. He is a member of the Oakland Tech Hall of Honor. He was teammates on Oakland Tech’s championship football team with future NFL quarterback John Brodie and future NFL lineman Proverb Jacobs.

== College ==
Atkins attended Santa Ana Junior College where he was a multidisciplinary contributor to the school's track and field team, participating at a high level in the 100-yard dash, 220-yard dash, pole vault, high jump, and discus. He joined the Dons' football team for the 1958 season, scoring two touchdowns in the team's conference opener — once on a 10-yard rush and the other on a 60-yard interception return. Atkins hit for a 65-yard touch down run in one game, followed by a three touchdown effort in the next, leading the Dons to an undefeated start and sixth place in the National Junior College rankings.

He enrolled at New Mexico State University for the 1959 season, seeing time as halfback, flanker, and placekicker. He led the team to an 11–0 record and the Border Conference title. That year he became the first of four straight New Mexico State University players to lead the nation in rushing yardage with 130 carries for 971 yards, followed by Bob Gaiters (1,338 yards in 1960) and Preacher Pilot (1,278 yards in 1961 and 1,247 yards in 1962). He was the first New Mexico State University football player to be named to the Associated Press All-America first team. He was selected All-Border Conference in 1959-60.

In 1959, Atkins led the nation in rushing yards (971), yards per carry (7.5), rushing touchdowns (13), touchdowns (16), total points (107 or 96), and yards per punt return (17.7). As of the beginning of the 2023 season, he still held New Mexico State University's records for yards per carry for a career (8.1), punt return average for a season (21.8), and punt return average for a career (15.1).

In 1960, Atkins gained 611 rushing yards in only 65 attempts (a 9.4 yards per carry average), and 468 yards receiving on 26 catches (18 yards per catch). He averaged 11.9 yards per play from scrimmage. He scored two rushing touchdowns and six receiving touchdowns. He was ninth in Heisman Trophy voting that year.

Atkins led the nation in all-purpose yards in both 1959 and 1960. He scored the first touchdown on a 44-yard pass reception in the 1959 Sun Bowl, a 28–8 New Mexico State victory. He also caught a touchdown pass in the 1960 Sun Bowl, a 20–13 New Mexico State victory. Both passes were thrown by future NFL 15-year quarterback Charley Johnson. Atkins also participated in the College All Star Game in 1961.

On April 30, 2009, Atkins was elected to the College Football Hall of Fame. He was inducted into the New Mexico State Athletics Hall of Fame in 1970. New Mexico State retired his number 27. In 2014, New Mexico State began presenting the annual Pervis Atkins Spirit Award.

== Professional football ==
Atkins was drafted in the third round of the 1960 NFL draft, the 30th pick overall by the Los Angeles Rams. His rookie campaign was spent backing up the Rams' star halfback Ollie Matson. He was sparingly used in his rookie campaign as a receiver out of the backfield, catching five balls for a total of 67 yards during the 1961 NFL season. He was less effective as a runner, garnering just 19 yards on 5 carries.

Atkins' aptitude catching the football, combined with his sprinter's speed (he had run 9.6 seconds for the 100 yard dash on multiple occasions as a track athlete), made him a prime candidate for conversion to "flanker back," forerunner of the modern wide receiver. He also came into his own as a kickoff return specialist, taking over that role for the Rams effective with the 1962 season. Atkins would finish the 1962 NFL season with 35 receptions for nearly 400 yards as a receiver with a kickoff return average of just over 24 yards per attempt.

Atkins fell into disfavor with the Rams as a receiver midway through the 1963 NFL season, with his last of 14 catches coming in Week 8 against the Minnesota Vikings. He remained a reliable returner of kickoffs and punts, averaging nearly 22.6 yards and 3.0 yards per return, respectively.

The 1964 NFL season saw Atkins move to the Washington Redskins, who initially used him exclusively as a kickoff and punt return man. In Week 10 he was returned to the backfield as a reserve running back, however, and he would finish the year with 25 carries for 98 yards and a touchdown, also catching 8 balls for 35 additional yards.

Atkins would take the field for the Redskins again in 1965, but he was replaced as a kick returner. After four largely ineffective games running the ball, gaining just 44 yards on 18 carries, the Redskins and Atkins parted ways. Atkins landed with the Oakland Raiders of the rival American Football League, playing only in the Week 11 game against the Denver Broncos, during which he caught one ball for just 6 yards.

In his final season in professional football, 1966, Atkins served as the primary kickoff returner for the Raiders, averaging nearly 21 yards per return for the season. Atkins finished his six year career with just three touchdowns scored, crossing the goal line one time each in the 1962, 1963, and 1964 NFL campaigns.

== Entertainment career ==
Also an actor and producer, Atkins appeared in the 1974 feature film The Longest Yard, the made-for-TV movie The Desperate Miles, and the 1976 pilot for the TV series Delvecchio, as well as a guest-starring role in an episode of The Six Million Dollar Man. He resided in Los Angeles until his death.

Year	Title	Role	Notes
1974	The Longest Yard	Mawabe	

== Death ==
On December 22, 2017, Atkins died in the Los Angeles area. He had been in an assisted-living facility and had suffered from dementia. He was 82 years old.

== See also ==
- List of American Football League players
- List of NCAA major college football yearly rushing leaders
- List of NCAA major college football yearly scoring leaders
- List of NCAA major college yearly punt and kickoff return leaders
