= Bob Gaiters =

American gridiron football player (1938–2024)

No. 35, 28, 20, 31, 33, 24
- Position: Halfback

Personal information
- Born: February 26, 1938; Zanesville, Ohio, U.S.
- Died: January 5, 2024 (aged 85)
- Listed height: 5 ft 11 in (1.80 m)
- Listed weight: 210 lb (95 kg)

Career information
- High school: Zanesville
- College: New Mexico State
- NFL draft: 1961: 2nd round, 17th overall pick
- AFL draft: 1961: 1st round, 4th overall pick

Career history
- New York Giants (1961–1962); San Francisco 49ers (1962); Denver Broncos (1963); Baltimore Colts (1964)*; Hamilton Tiger-Cats (1964); Newark Bears (1965); Hartford Charter Oaks (1966); Orange County Ramblers (1967)
- * Offseason or practice squad member only

Career NFL/AFL statistics
- Rushing yards: 673
- Rushing average: 4
- Receptions: 17
- Receiving yards: 175
- Total touchdowns: 8
- Stats at Pro Football Reference

Robert James Gaiters (February 26, 1938 – January 5, 2024) was an American professional football player who was a halfback in the National Football League (NFL).

Gaiters attended Santa Ana Junior College, and transferred to New Mexico State University in 1959. He was a star player on their Aggies football team. A fast tailback weighing over two hundred pounds (91 kg), Gaiters helped lead the Aggies during their undefeated season in 1960, and claimed the collegiate national championships in rushing and scoring.

Gaiters was drafted by the Denver Broncos in the 1961 American Football League draft and by the New York Giants in the 1961 NFL draft. He played two seasons in the NFL, spending time with the Giants and San Francisco 49ers. Gaiters spent the 1963 season with the Broncos of the AFL. He then played for the Hamilton Tiger-Cats of the Canadian Football League in 1964.

Gaiters finished his career in the Continental Football League where he played for the Newark Bears in 1965, the Hartford Charter Oaks in 1966 and the Orange County Ramblers in 1967.

Gaiters died on January 5, 2024, at the age of 85.

== See also ==
- List of NCAA major college football yearly rushing leaders
- List of NCAA major college football yearly scoring leaders
