= New Mexico State Aggies football =

Football team

2026 New Mexico State Aggies football team
- First season: 1893; 133 years ago
- Athletic director: Joe Fields
- Head coach: Tony Sanchez; 2nd season, 7–18 (.280)
- Location: Las Cruces, New Mexico
- Stadium: Aggie Memorial Stadium (capacity: 28,853)
- NCAA division: Division I FBS
- Conference: Conference USA
- Colors: Crimson and white
- All-time record: 462–689–30 (.404)
- Bowl record: 4–1–1 (.750)

Conference championships
- Border: 1938, 1960 MVC: 1976, 1978
- Rivalries: New Mexico (rivalry); UTEP (rivalry)
- Marching band: The "PRIDE" of New Mexico
- Website: NMStatesports.com

The New Mexico State Aggies football team represents New Mexico State University in NCAA Division I Football Bowl Subdivision (FBS) college football as a member of Conference USA.

New Mexico State spent the 2013 season as an independent and from 2014 to 2017 as a football–only member of the Sun Belt Conference, New Mexico State began playing as an independent again with the 2018 football season. On November 5, 2021, New Mexico State announced it would be joining Conference USA in all sports including football starting in 2023. New Mexico State has one of the longest droughts among all current FBS teams of being ranked in the AP Poll, having previously being ranked in 1960.

== History ==
=== Early history (1893–1985) ===
One of New Mexico State's earliest football games was the first match-up against in-state rival New Mexico on January 1, 1894. From 1914 to 1916, Clarence Russell served as head football coach of the Aggies, compiling a 7–2–6 record. Dutch Bergman served as head coach from 1920 to 1922, compiling a record of 12–1–5. R. R. Brown served as the head football coach of the Aggies from 1923 to 1925. He led the 1923 team to an undefeated 9–0 record, including victories over Hardin–Simmons, and rival teams New Mexico, and UTEP. Jerry Hines began coaching the Aggies in 1929, and was also coach of the men's basketball team. Hines’ teams competed well in the new Border Conference. Between 1934 and 1938, the football record was 31–10–6, and the team was invited to the first Sun Bowl in 1936 where they tied the powerful Hardin–Simmons Cowboys 14–14. Hines's coaching career ended with his induction into military service during World War II. Julius H. Johnston took over the Aggies football team after Hines's resignation, and led the Aggies for three seasons before departing to serve in World War II. In his absence, assistant coach Maurice Moulder led the team. Johnston's record was 6–21. The Aggies did not field a football team from 1944 to 1945 because of the events surrounding World War II. From 1946 to 1947, Ray Curfman was the head coach of the Aggies, then in the Border Conference. Curfman's Aggies compiled an 8–11 record. He resigned in December 1947 to work in the sporting goods industry in Texas. From 1948 to 1957, NMSU compiled a dismal 21–74 record under four head coaches (Vaughn Corley, Joseph Coleman, James Patton and Anthony Cavallo) that were either fired or forced to resign in succession. Fan support and attendance declined, recruiting was becoming more difficult and alumni and administration support was drying up. This would be a sign of things to come for the Aggie football program.

=== Warren B. Woodson era (1958–1967) ===
Future College Football Hall of Fame inductee Warren B. Woodson took over as head coach in 1958. He previously had success at the Conway Teachers College (now Central Arkansas) and Hardin–Simmons. In his second season at New Mexico State, Woodson's team defeated North Texas in the 1959 Sun Bowl. The following year, Woodson guided the Aggies to an 11–0 finish, the only perfect season in school history. That year, New Mexico State defeated Utah State, 20–13, in the 1960 Sun Bowl and attained a final AP Poll ranking of 17th. Quarterback Charley Johnson won the bowl MVP honors both years becoming the first and still only player in NCAA history to win the MVP award from the same bowl game in back-to-back years. Johnson went on to play in the National Football League for 15 years with the St. Louis Cardinals, Houston Oilers and Denver Broncos. During his NFL career he managed to complete a Doctorate in Chemical Engineering making him one of only a handful of NFL player to earn a Ph.D. Dr. Johnson subsequently retired as a professor and department head of the Chemical Engineering school at NMSU. The Aggies continued to fare well under Woodson through the 1967 season. However at the end of that season, university administration, with whom Woodson had a contentious relationship throughout his career, invoked a clause requiring state employees to retire at age 65. Thus Woodson, who would turn 65 that offseason, was essentially forced out despite a 7–2–1 1967 campaign that ended with a 54–7 shellacking of archrival New Mexico.

Despite some impressive single game wins and individual player stats, the Aggies have struggled as a team in the days since Warren Woodson. Since his departure Aggie football has spiraled into an abyss of perennial futility that some Aggie fans have begun to refer to as the "Woodson Curse." In the 49 seasons between Woodson's firing and 2016, NMSU amassed just four winning seasons while failing to appear in a single bowl game until the 2017 Arizona Bowl.

=== A new conference and struggles (1968–1985) ===
From 1968 to 1985, NMSU's football program declined, failing to reach a single bowl game and struggling to win football games. The Aggies joined the Missouri Valley Conference under coach Jim Wood in 1971. Jim Bradley, Gil Krueger and Fred Zechman also led the Aggies football program during these years and they failed to produce any winning seasons as they were fired as a result. In 1978, Krueger and the Aggies went 6–5 and won the Missouri Valley Conference, their only winning season between 1967 and 1992.

=== Mike Knoll era (1986–1989) ===
In December 1985, Miami linebackers coach and former Aggies linebackers coach Mike Knoll was named NMSU's new head coach, replacing the fired Zechman. Under Knoll, the Aggies were abysmal, compiling a 4–40 record that included a 17-game losing streak at the end. In each of Knoll's four seasons, the Aggies were outscored by at least 200 points. Knoll was fired after a winless 1989 season.

=== Jim Hess era (1990–1996) ===
NMSU, hoping for a positive change in results, hired Jim Hess away from Stephen F. Austin in December 1989. In November 1990, the Aggies managed to snap their 27-game losing streak, the longest active losing streak at the time, when they defeated Cal State Fullerton 43–9. Fullerton dropped its football program following the 1992 season. The 1988–90 NMSU team is ranked the ninth worst college football team of all time by ESPN. The Aggies were also featured in the August 31, 1992, issue of Sports Illustrated in a piece that chronicles a tradition of losing games. Overall, the same subpar results remained under Hess, leading to his firing after seven seasons. Hess' record at NMSU was 22–55. However, Hess did lead the Aggies to their first winning season in 14 years in 1992, a 6–5 campaign.

=== Tony Samuel era (1997–2004) ===
Nebraska defensive ends coach Tony Samuel took over the Aggies football program in December 1996. Under Samuel's guidance, New Mexico State compiled a 34–57 record. The highlight of Samuel's tenure was on September 18, 1999, when the Aggies traveled to Tempe and upset No. 22 ranked Arizona State by a shocking 35–7 score, bringing much-needed attention to the football program. Running back Denvis Manns became the third college football player to rush for 1,000 yards each of his four seasons. At that time the only other backs that had accomplished the feat at that time were Tony Dorsett (Pittsburgh) and Amos Lawrence (North Carolina). Although Samuel would lead the Aggies to winning records in 1999 and 2002, the Aggies failed to win a conference title or receive a bowl game bid under his leadership and his contract was not renewed following a 5–6 season in 2004.

=== Hal Mumme era (2005–2008) ===
NMSU turned to former Kentucky head coach Hal Mumme to turn around the moribund program in December 2004. Mumme brought his high-scoring, pass-oriented offense known as the "Air Raid" to NMSU. Under Mumme, the Aggies compiled an 11–38 record. At the end of the 2008 season the Aggies ended their fourth season under Mumme at 3–9 (1–7 WAC) with a disappointing 47–2 loss to Utah State. The following Tuesday, December 2, Mumme was fired. The 15-year NFL veteran quarterback Charley Johnson, who an alumnus and was then a chemical engineering professor at New Mexico State, was appointed as interim head coach during the search for a replacement.

=== DeWayne Walker era (2009–2012) ===
UCLA defensive coordinator DeWayne Walker was named NMSU's head coach on December 31, 2008, signifying a new direction for the pass offense-oriented squad. Under Walker's tutelage, NMSU compiled a 10–40 record, failing to win more than four games in a given season. Walker, facing mounting pressure from administration, alumni and fans, resigned as head coach and departed NMSU to serve as defensive backs coach for the NFL's Jacksonville Jaguars.

=== Doug Martin era (2013–2021) ===
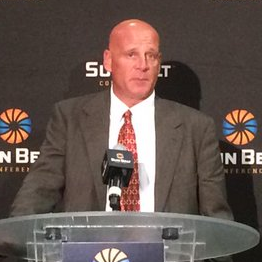
Doug Martin

NMSU hired Boston College offensive coordinator and former Kent State head coach Doug Martin as the program's 34th head coach in February 2013. Martin had previously been offensive coordinator at NMSU during the 2011 season helping obtain the school's first victory over a Big Ten team (Minnesota) before being hired away by Boston College. In Martin's first season at the helm, the Aggies compiled a 2–10 record. The 2015 season saw the Aggies finish with a 3–9 win–loss record, with all three wins coming in Sun Belt Conference play, where the Aggies finished tied for 5th. The results included a loss to local rival UTEP in The Battle of I-10 by a score of 50–47 in OT, marking the 7th straight loss to the Miners in the series. On December 2, 2017, the Aggies defeated South Alabama 22–17 at Aggie Memorial Stadium to finish the regular season at 6–6 and advance to its first bowl game in 57 years, where they would play in the Arizona Bowl at Arizona Stadium in Tucson on December 29, 2017. New Mexico State defeated Utah State 26–20 in overtime in front of a loud partisan crowd for New Mexico State. It was the first winning season for the Aggies since 2002.

=== Jerry Kill era (2022–2023) ===
On November 28, 2021, former Minnesota head coach Jerry Kill was officially named the next head coach for the Aggies. Kill, a successful former head coach who stepped away due to health issues, signed a five-year contract that pays $550,000 per year. In Kill's first season in 2022 the Aggies stumbled to a 1–5 start before a midseason turnaround saw them win five of their last six games to finish the regular season 6–6 and receive a bid to the Quick Lane Bowl where they defeated Bowling Green 24–19.

On November 18, 2023, during Coach Kill's second season, the Aggies delivered a 31-10 beatdown to the Auburn University Tigers of the SEC, in an historic upset victory. The win marked head coach Jerry Kill's second consecutive victory over Auburn head coach Hugh Freeze, who was the head coach of Liberty University when the Flames lost to the Aggies in 2022.

=== Tony Sanchez era (2024–present) ===
On January 4, 2024, former UNLV head coach and New Mexico State player Tony Sanchez was officially named head coach for the Aggies, after coach Jerry Kill stepped down. He signed a five-year contract that will pay him $600,000 in his first year, but increases each year by $25,000 reaching $700,000 in 2028. Additional bonus will be added for reaching a bowl game and/or winning six or more games.

== Conference affiliations ==
- Independent (1893–1930)
- Border Conference (1931–1961)
- Independent (1962–1970)
- Missouri Valley Conference (1971–1983)
- Big West Conference (1984–2000)
- Sun Belt Conference (2001–2004)
- Western Athletic Conference (2005–2012)
- Independent (2013)
- Sun Belt (2014–2017)
- Independent (2018–2022)
- Conference USA (2023–present)

=== WAC realignment and Sun Belt era, 2010–2017 ===
From 2010 to 2013, the Western Athletic Conference (WAC) underwent a major realignment, which would leave the conference with only two football-playing members as of the 2013 season (NMSU and Idaho). As a result, the WAC could no longer sponsor football as a conference sport.

On September 12, 2012, New Mexico State announced that it would stay in the Football Bowl Subdivision (FBS) and become an independent for 2013, while exploring potential conference affiliations for future seasons. In 2014, New Mexico State's football team returned to the Sun Belt Conference (of which the school was formerly a full member) as an "associate member" for that sport only, while keeping its other sports in the WAC. However, on March 1, 2016, the Sun Belt Conference announced via teleconference that New Mexico State's football-only associate membership would not be renewed following the 2017 FBS season because it, along with fellow football-only member Idaho, were too far from the Sun Belt's geographic "footprint" in the Southeastern United States. New Mexico State football then resumed its independent status at the start of the 2018 season.

On November 5, 2021, New Mexico State announced it would be joining Conference USA in all sports including football starting in 2023. It joined alongside new members Sam Houston State, Jacksonville State, and Liberty. Also, it will be joining Battle of I-10 rival UTEP in the conference.

=== Conference USA realignment 2021–2023 ===

In 2021, the New Mexico State Aggies were accepted to join Conference USA and would start by 2023. The Aggies, coming off a Quick Lane Bowl winning season, were hungry to join a conference, and after being independent for years, they finally had a chance. In 2023, the Aggies put together a 10–3 regular season and earned a spot in the 2023 CUSA Championship against the Liberty Flames, also making their debut in the conference and its championship game.

== Conference championships ==
New Mexico State has won four conference championships, two shared.

Year	Conference	Coach	Overall record	Conference record
1938†	Border Conference	Jerry Hines	7–2	4–1
1960	Border Conference	Warren B. Woodson	11–0	4–0
1976†	Missouri Valley Conference	Jim Bradley	4–6–1	2–1–1
1978	Missouri Valley Conference	Gil Krueger	6–5	5–1

† Co-championship

== Bowl games ==
The Aggies have a 4–1–1 record in their bowl games.

The Aggies went 57 seasons between bowl appearances (December 31, 1960 – December 29, 2017), which had been the longest current drought by an FBS team.

Season	Coach	Bowl	Opponent	Result
1935	Jerry Hines	Sun Bowl	Hardin–Simmons	T 14–14
1959	Warren B. Woodson	Sun Bowl	North Texas State	W 28–8
1960	Warren B. Woodson	Sun Bowl	Utah State	W 20–13
2017	Doug Martin	Arizona Bowl	Utah State	W 26–20 OT
2022	Jerry Kill	Quick Lane Bowl	Bowling Green	W 24–19
2023	Jerry Kill	New Mexico Bowl	Fresno State	L 10–37

== Rivalries ==
=== New Mexico ===
NMSU's biggest rival is in-state foe New Mexico. The series, known as the Rio Grande Rivalry, dates back to January 1, 1894 – eighteen years before the state of New Mexico achieved statehood – when the schools met in a football contest in Albuquerque. While it is clear that New Mexico won that first game, school records seem to disagree on the score. According to New Mexico media guides the final score was 25–5 but according to New Mexico State media guides the score was 18–6. By the time New Mexico entered the union in 1912 UNM and New Mexico A&M (as NMSU was known prior to 1959) had already met on the gridiron six times. Beginning in 1993, the two universities played for the Maloof Trophy, but it was short-lived; the trophy was retired in 2000.

Until 1937, the series was competitive with the Aggies holding a 15–12–4 lead over the Lobos. Since 1938 the Lobos have dominated the series 61–20–1 except during 1959–1968 when the Aggies won 7 of 10 meetings. The Lobos' all-time advantage is 73–35–5; however, the rivalry remains spirited. The September 26, 2009, game when the Aggies won 20–17 in Albuquerque was the 100th time the teams had played each other. Including that 100th meeting, the series is even at 7 wins each over the past 14 meetings.

=== UTEP ===
The Aggies also hold a rivalry with UTEP, known as the Battle of I-10. Although UTEP holds the series lead at 57–38–2, this is largely due to dominance in the series from the 1920s to the 1960s. From 1969 through 2000, each team acquired 16 victories each. However, UTEP's advantage is now 13–6 in the last 19 games.

The winner of the annual matchup receives a pair of traveling trophies. The older of the two is known as the Silver Spade. It is a replica of an old prospector's shovel found in an abandoned mine in the Organ Mountains near Las Cruces and has been traded between the schools since 1955. A second trophy, officially titled the Mayor's Cup but commonly nicknamed the Brass Spittoon, was added in 1982.

Due to the close proximity of the campuses it was natural for a rivalry to develop. The Texas College of Mines played its first ever game against a collegiate opponent versus New Mexico A&M on October 31, 1914, and with few exceptions, including during World War I and World War II, the teams would meet again every year. Following World War II the series resumed on an annual basis from 1946 until 2001, when UTEP's administration made the controversial decision to cancel their scheduled trip to Las Cruces in favor of scheduling an additional home contest against a Division I-AA opponent. The schools agreed to meet again in 2002 (a 49–14 NMSU win, their biggest blowout of the Miners since 1922), but did not play again until 2004 in El Paso when the Miners exacted revenge for their blowout loss two years prior with a 45–0 pasting of the Aggies, the most lopsided result in the series in 55 years. The blowout marked the beginning of a three-game winning streak for UTEP in the rivalry. The tide of the series then seemingly turned back in the Aggies' favor, as NMSU defeated UTEP the next two years, their first back-to-back wins over UTEP since 1994 and 1995. The Aggies edged the Miners 34–33 on September 20, 2008, at the Sun Bowl for their first win in El Paso since 1994. However, the most recent three games in the series have gone back to the Miners, with UTEP defeating NMSU at Aggie Memorial Stadium 38–12 on September 19, 2009 (only their second win in the Mesilla Valley since 1991), topping the Aggies 42–10 at the Sun Bowl on September 18, 2010, and again defeating the Aggies 16–10 on September 17, 2011, in Las Cruces for their first back-to-back road wins in the series since winning four straight games in Las Cruces between 1986 and 1991.

== National award winners ==
- AFCA Coach of the Year

AFCA Coach of the Year
Year	Name	Division
1960	Warren B. Woodson	NCAA Division II

- National Football Foundation National Scholar-Athlete Award

NFF National Scholar-Athlete Award
Year	Name	Position
1975	Ralph Jackson	OL

- College Football Network Freshman Interior Defender of the Year

CFN Freshman Interior Defender of the Year
Year	Name	Position
2024	Malaki Ta’ase	DT

== Conference Awards ==
- Diego Pavia, QB, 2023 Conference USA Offensive Player of the Year
- Diego Pavia, QB, 2023 Second Team All-Conference USA
- Shiyazh Pete, OT, 2023 First Team All-Conference USA

== All-Americans ==
- Pervis Atkins, HB- 1960 (AP-1st; NEA-1st; UPI-3rd)
- Jim Pilot, HB- 1962 (NEA-2nd)
- Jim Bohl, HB- 1966 (FN- 1st)
- Manny Rodriguez, OT- 1969 (CP-3rd)
- Hank Cook, WR- 1973 (AP-3rd)
- Carl Dean, G- 1974 (AP-3rd)
- Carl Dean, G- 1975 (AP-3rd)
- Larry Rose III, HB- 2015 (AP-3rd)
- Malaki Ta’ase, DT- 2024 (CFN Freshman All-American)
- Ezra Christensen, DL- 2025 First Team All-American (PFSN and HERO)

== Future non-conference opponents ==
Announced schedules as of December 1, 2025.

2026	2027	2028	2029	2030	2031	2032	2033	2034
at Florida State	at Texas	New Mexico	at New Mexico	at Louisiana		at Wyoming		at Tulsa
Mercyhurst	Hawaii	at UMass						
at Hawaii	at New Mexico							
New Mexico								
