= List of Monmouth Hawks football seasons =

This is a list of seasons completed by the Monmouth Hawks football team. Representing Monmouth University in West Long Branch, New Jersey, the Hawks compete in the Big South Conference as a member of the NCAA Division I FCS. Since its inception in 1992, the Monmouth football program has been led by head coach Kevin Callahan, the first and only head coach in Monmouth football history. The team plays its home games at the 3,200-seat Kessler Field.

Monmouth has captured five conference titles, all of which came during its tenure in the Northeast Conference from 1996 to 2012. They have played in two lower-level bowl games, and made the NCAA Division I FCS playoffs for the first time in program history in 2017.

== Seasons ==
Legend

†National Champions
^{†} Conference champions
^{‡} Division champions
^Bowl game berth/Playoff Result

List of Monmouth Hawks football seasons
Season	Team	Head coach	Conference	Division	Regular season results							Postseason results	Final ranking	
Season	Team	Head coach	Conference	Division	Overall			Conference				Bowl game/Playoff result	TSN/STATS Poll	Coaches' Poll
Season	Team	Head coach	Conference	Division	Win	Loss	Tie	Win	Loss	Tie	Finish	Bowl game/Playoff result	TSN/STATS Poll	Coaches' Poll
Monmouth Hawks
1993	1993	Kevin Callahan	Independent	—	2	5	0				—	—	—	—
1994	1994	Kevin Callahan	Independent	—	7	2	0				—	—	—	—
1995	1995	Kevin Callahan	Independent	—	7	3	0				—	—	—	—
1996 (Note: Overtime rules were added to college football in 1996, thereby eliminating ties.)	1996^{†}	Kevin Callahan	Northeast	—	7	3		3	1		T–1st^{†}	—	—	—
1997	1997	Kevin Callahan	Northeast	—	5	4		3	1		2nd	—	—	—
1998	1998^{†}	Kevin Callahan	Northeast	—	5	5		4	1		T–1st^{†}	—	—	—
1999	1999	Kevin Callahan	Northeast	—	2	8		2	5		6th	—	—	—
2000	2000	Kevin Callahan	Northeast	—	5	6		4	4		5th	—	—	—
2001	2001	Kevin Callahan	Northeast	—	7	3		5	2		T–3rd	—	—	—
2002	2002	Kevin Callahan	Northeast	—	2	8		2	5		6th	—	—	—
2003	2003^{†}	Kevin Callahan	Northeast	—	10	2		6	1		T–1st^{†}	Lost 2003 ECAC Bowl against Duquesne, 10–12 ^	—	—
2004	2004^{†}	Kevin Callahan	Northeast	—	10	1		6	1		T–1st^{†}	—	—	—
2005	2005	Kevin Callahan	Northeast	—	6	4		4	3		T–3rd	—	—	—
2006	2006^{†}	Kevin Callahan	Northeast	—	10	2		6	1		1st^{†}	Lost 2006 Gridiron Classic against San Diego, 7–27 ^	—	—
2007	2007	Kevin Callahan	Northeast	—	4	6		3	3		T–3rd	—	—	—
2008	2008	Kevin Callahan	Northeast	—	7	4		6	1		2nd	—	—	—
2009	2009	Kevin Callahan	Northeast	—	5	6		4	4		5th	—	—	—
2010	2010	Kevin Callahan	Northeast	—	3	8		3	5		6th	—	—	—
2011	2011	Kevin Callahan	Northeast	—	5	6		4	4		4th	—	—	—
2012	2012	Kevin Callahan	Northeast	—	5	5		4	3		3rd	—	—	—
2013	2013	Kevin Callahan	Independent	—	6	6						—	—	—
2014	2014	Kevin Callahan	Big South	—	6	5		1	4		5th	—	—	—
2015	2015	Kevin Callahan	Big South	—	5	6		3	3		T–3rd	—	—	—
2016	2016	Kevin Callahan	Big South	—	4	7		0	5		6th	—	—	—
2017	2017	Kevin Callahan	Big South	—	9	3		4	1		2nd	NCAA Division I FCS Playoffs – First Round ^	—	—
2018	2018	Kevin Callahan	Big South	—	8	3		4	1		2nd	—	—	—
2019	2019^{†}	Kevin Callahan	Big South	—	11	3		6	0		1st^{†}	NCAA Division I FCS Playoffs – Second Round ^	12	13
2020	2020^{†}	Kevin Callahan	Big South	—	3	1		3	0		1st^{†}	NCAA Division I FCS Playoffs – First Round ^	11	10
2021	2021	Kevin Callahan	Big South	—	7	4		6	1		2nd	—	—	—
2022	2022	Kevin Callahan	CAA	—	5	6		3	5		9th	—	—	—
2023	2023	Kevin Callahan	CAA	—	4	7		3	5		T–11th	—	—	—
2024	2024	Kevin Callahan	CAA	—	6	6		4	4		T–9th	—	—	—
2025	2025	Kevin Callahan	CAA	—	9	3		6	2		T–3rd	—	22	20
Totals					All-time: 197–151–0 (.566)			Conference: 111–76–0 (.594)			—	Postseason: 1–5 (.167)	—	—
