= 1996 Richmond Spiders football team =

American college football season

1996 Richmond Spiders football
- Conference: Yankee Conference
- Record: 2–9 (1–7 Yankee)
- Head coach: Jim Reid (2nd season)
- Defensive coordinator: John Zamberlin (2nd season)
- Home stadium: University of Richmond Stadium

1996 Yankee Conference football standings
| | Conf. | | | Overall |
| Team | W | | L | W | | L |
|---|---|---|---|---|---|---|
New England Division
| No. 18 New Hampshire x | 6 | – | 2 | 8 | – | 3 |
| Maine | 5 | – | 3 | 7 | – | 4 |
| UMass | 4 | – | 4 | 6 | – | 5 |
| Connecticut | 3 | – | 5 | 4 | – | 6 |
| Rhode Island | 2 | – | 6 | 4 | – | 6 |
| Boston University | 0 | – | 8 | 1 | – | 10 |
Mid-Atlantic Division
| No. 7 William & Mary x$^ | 7 | – | 1 | 10 | – | 3 |
| No. 14 Villanova ^ | 6 | – | 2 | 8 | – | 4 |
| No. 11 Delaware ^ | 6 | – | 2 | 8 | – | 4 |
| No. 23 James Madison | 5 | – | 3 | 7 | – | 4 |
| Northeastern | 3 | – | 5 | 6 | – | 5 |
| Richmond | 1 | – | 7 | 2 | – | 9 |
$ – Conference champion; x – Division champion/co-champions; ^ – NCAA Division I-AA playoff participant; Rankings from The Sports Network poll

The 1996 Richmond Spiders football team was an American football team that represented the University of Richmond as a member of the Yankee Conference during the 1996 NCAA Division I-AA football season. In its second season under head coach Jim Reid, the team compiled a 2–9 record (1–7 against Yankee Conference opponents) and played its home games at University of Richmond Stadium in Richmond, Virginia.

== Schedule ==
| Date | Time | Opponent | Site | Result | Attendance | Source |
|---|---|---|---|---|---|---|
| September 7 | | Colgate* | University of Richmond Stadium; Richmond, VA | W 13–0 | 11,089 | |
| September 14 | | at The Citadel* | Johnson Hagood Stadium; Charleston, SC | L 10–13 | 13,069 | |
| September 21 | 1:00 p.m. | UMass | University of Richmond Stadium; Richmond, VA | L 17–23 ^{OT} | 15,237 | |
| September 28 | | at Boston University | Nickerson Field; Boston, MA | W 37–7 | | |
| October 5 | | at Northeastern | Parsons Field; Brookline, MA | L 10–27 | 5,500 | |
| October 12 | | Delaware | University of Richmond Stadium; Richmond, VA | L 7–14 | 7,814 | |
| October 19 | | James Madison | University of Richmond Stadium; Richmond, VA (rivalry) | L 27–31 | | |
| October 26 | | Villanova | University of Richmond Stadium; Richmond, VA | L 3–20 | 8,841 | |
| November 2 | | at New Hampshire | Wildcat Stadium; Durham, NH | L 13–14 | 2,837 | |
| November 9 | | at VMI* | Alumni Memorial Field; Lexington, VA (rivalry) | L 7–10 | | |
| November 16 | | William & Mary | University of Richmond Stadium; Richmond, VA (I-64 Bowl) | L 13–28 | 11,204 | |
*Non-conference game; All times are in Eastern time

== Roster ==
1996 Richmond Spiders football team roster
Players
Coaches
Offense

| Pos. | # | Name | Class |
|---|---|---|---|
| OL | 57 | David Cooney | Jr |
| WR | 20 | Aaron Cooper | Fr |
| OL | 77 | Don Cunningham | So |
| TE | 85 | Matt Davis | Fr |
| QB | 19 | Joe Elrod | Sr |
| RB | 44 | Matt Snider | So |

Defense

| Pos. | # | Name | Class |
|---|---|---|---|
| LB, DB | 47 | Paris Lenon | Fr |
| DL | 54 | Marc Megna | So |
| DB | 6 | Keith Middleton | Jr |

Special teams

| Pos. | # | Name | Class |

Head coach

- Al Bagnoli

Coordinators/assistant coaches

Legend

- (C) Team captain
- (S) Suspended
- (I) Ineligible
- Injured
- Redshirt

Roster
