= 1996 Sam Houston State Bearkats football team =

American college football season

1996 Sam Houston State Bearkats football
- Conference: Southland Conference
- Record: 4–7 (3–3 Southland)
- Head coach: Ron Randleman (15th season)
- Defensive coordinator: Mike Lucas (7th season)
- Home stadium: Bowers Stadium

1996 Southland Football League standings
	Conf.			Overall
Team	W		L	W		L
No. 5 Troy State $^	5	–	1	12	–	2
No. 19 Nicholls State ^	4	–	2	8	–	4
No. 22 Stephen F. Austin	3	–	3	7	–	4
Northwestern State	3	–	3	6	–	5
Sam Houston State	3	–	3	4	–	7
Southwest Texas State	2	–	4	5	–	6
McNeese State	1	–	5	3	–	8
$ – Conference champion; ^ – NCAA Division I-AA playoff participant; Rankings from The Sports Network poll

The 1996 Sam Houston State Bearkats football team represented Sam Houston State University as a member of the Southland Conference during the 1996 NCAA Division I-AA football season. Led by 15th-year head coach Ron Randleman, the Bearkats compiled an overall record of 4–7 with a mark of 3–3 in conference play, and finished tied for third in the Southland.

== Schedule ==
Date	Opponent	Site	Result	Attendance	Source
August 31	at Houston*	Robertson Stadium; Houston, TX	L 25–43	14,110	
September 7	Central State (OH)*	Bowers Stadium; Huntsville, TX	W 27–20		
September 14	at Texas A&M–Kingsville*	Javelina Stadium; Kingsville, TX	L 17–41		
September 21	at Northeast Louisiana*	Malone Stadium; Monroe, LA	L 31–34	12,148	
September 28	Texas Southern*	Bowers Stadium; Huntsville, TX	L 20–26		
October 12	at No. 4 Stephen F. Austin	Homer Bryce Stadium; Nacogdoches, TX (Battle of the Piney Woods)	W 14–10		
October 19	at No. 22 Northwestern State	Harry Turpin Stadium; Natchitoches, LA	L 21–38		
October 26	McNeese State	Bowers Stadium; Huntsville, TX	W 30–25		
November 9	at Nicholls State	John L. Guidry Stadium; Thibodaux, LA	L 10–20	2,684	
November 16	No. 5 Troy State	Bowers Stadium; Huntsville, TX	L 14–35	5,014	
November 23	Southwest Texas State	Bowers Stadium; Huntsville, TX (rivalry)	W 29–17		
*Non-conference game; Rankings from The Sports Network Poll released prior to the game
