= Mike Hodges (American football) =

American football player and coach (born 1945)

Biographical details
- Born: November 14, 1945 (age 80)

Playing career
- 1965–1966: Maine
- Position: Guard

Coaching career (HC unless noted)
- 1978–1991: UMass (assistant/DC)
- 1992–1997: UMass
- 1998–2011: UMass (DFO)

Head coaching record
- Overall: 35–30

Accomplishments and honors

Awards
- New England Division I Coach of the Year (1992)

Mike Hodges (born November 14, 1945) is a former American college football coach and former player. He served as the head football coach at the University of Massachusetts Amherst from 1992 to 1997, compiling a record of 35–30.

== Coaching career ==
Hodges served as an assistant coach and a defensive coordinator at UMass for 14 years, under three different head coaches. Following the 1991 season he was named the school's head coach after Jim Reid resigned following budget disagreements with administration.

As head coach, Hodges compiled a 35–30 overall record with four winning seasons. His 35 wins were the fifth most in UMass history at the time, and he still ranks 7th on the UMass all-time win list. During his head coaching tenure, Hodges coached eight All-Americans and 39 All-Conference selections (Yankee Conference, Atlantic 10), including Walter Payton Award finalist and current ESPN analyst Rene Ingoglia. Hodges resigned after a 2–9 season in 1997.

After resigning as head coach, Hodges served as the Director of Football Operations for UMass until his retirement in 2011. Although Hodges did not make the postseason as head coach of the Minutemen, many fans of the school appreciated his contributions to the program. Hodges kept the Minutemen competitive at a time when huge budget cuts ravaged the Athletic Department. Also, many of his recruits were prominent members of the 1998 UMass team that won the Division 1AA National Championship.

== Head coaching record ==
Year	Team	Overall	Conference	Standing	Bowl/playoffs
UMass Minutemen (Yankee Conference) (1992–1996)
1992	UMass	7–3	5–3	3rd	
1993	UMass	9–2	6–2	2nd (New England)	
1994	UMass	5–6	4–4	3rd (New England)	
1995	UMass	6–5	3–5	4th (New England)	
1996	UMass	6–5	4–4	3rd (New England)	
UMass Minutemen (Atlantic 10 Conference) (1992–1996)
1997	UMass	2–9	1–7	5th (New England)	
UMass:		35–30	23–25		
Total:		35–30			
