= 1996 Texas Southern Tigers football team =

American college football season

1996 Texas Southern Tigers football
- Conference: Southwestern Athletic Conference
- Record: 7–4 (5–2 SWAC)
- Head coach: William A. Thomas (3rd season)
- Home stadium: Astrodome; Rice Stadium

1996 Southwestern Athletic Conference football standings
	Conf.			Overall
Team	W		L	W		L
No. T–8 Jackson State $^	6	–	1	10	–	2
Southern	5	–	2	7	–	5
Mississippi Valley State	5	–	2	7	–	4
Texas Southern	5	–	2	7	–	4
Alcorn State	3	–	4	4	–	7
Grambling State	2	–	5	3	–	8
Alabama State	2	–	5	3	–	8
Prairie View A&M	0	–	7	0	–	11
$ – Conference champion; ^ – NCAA Division I-AA playoff participant; Rankings from The Sports Network Poll

The 1996 Texas Southern Tigers football team represented Texas Southern University as a member of the Southwestern Athletic Conference (SWAC) during the 1996 NCAA Division I-AA football season. Led by third-year head coach William A. Thomas, the Tigers compiled an overall record of 7–4, with a mark of 5–2 in conference play, and finished tied for second in the SWAC.

== Schedule ==
Date	Opponent	Site	Result	Source
August 31	Prairie View A&M	Astrodome; Houston, TX (Labor Day Classic)	W 42–24	
September 7	at Alabama State	Cramton Bowl; Montgomery, AL	W 10–3	
September 21	vs. Lane*	Kermit Courville Stadium; Galveston, TX (Island Classic)	L 18–20	
September 28	at Sam Houston State*	Bowers Stadium; Huntsville, TX	W 26–20	
October 5	at No. 6 Jackson State	Mississippi Veterans Memorial Stadium; Jackson, MS	L 14–31	
October 12	vs. Arkansas–Pine Bluff*	Texas Stadium; Irving, TX (Mobil Gridiron Classic)	L 10–21	
October 19	at Alcorn State	Jack Spinks Stadium; Lorman, MS	W 28–17	
October 26	Mississippi Valley State	Rice Stadium; Houston, TX	L 17–23	
November 2	Grambling State	Astrodome; Houston, TX	W 20–7	
November 9	Morgan State*	Rice Stadium; Houston, TX	W 42–3	
November 16	at Southern	A. W. Mumford Stadium; Baton Rouge, LA	W 34–30	
*Non-conference game; Rankings from The Sports Network Poll released prior to the game
