= 1996 Prairie View A&M Panthers football team =

American college football season

1996 Prairie View A&M Panthers football
- Conference: Southwestern Athletic Conference
- Record: 0–11 (0–7 SWAC)
- Head coach: Hensley Sapenter (2nd season)
- Home stadium: Edward L. Blackshear Field; Robertson Stadium

1996 Southwestern Athletic Conference football standings
	Conf.			Overall
Team	W		L	W		L
No. T–8 Jackson State $^	6	–	1	10	–	2
Southern	5	–	2	7	–	5
Mississippi Valley State	5	–	2	7	–	4
Texas Southern	5	–	2	7	–	4
Alcorn State	3	–	4	4	–	7
Grambling State	2	–	5	3	–	8
Alabama State	2	–	5	3	–	8
Prairie View A&M	0	–	7	0	–	11
$ – Conference champion; ^ – NCAA Division I-AA playoff participant; Rankings from The Sports Network Poll

The 1996 Prairie View A&M Panthers football team represented Prairie View A&M University as a member of the Southwestern Athletic Conference (SWAC) during the 1996 NCAA Division I-AA football season. Led by second-year head coach Hensley Sapenter, the Panthers compiled an overall record of 0–11, with a mark of 0–7 in conference play, and finished eighth in the SWAC.

== Schedule ==
Date	Opponent	Site	Result	Attendance	Source
August 31	at Texas Southern	Astrodome; Houston, TX (Labor Day Classic)	L 24–42		
September 7	Abilene Christian*	Edward L. Blackshear Field; Prairie View, TX	L 14–30		
September 14	at Hardin–Simmons*	Shelton Stadium; Abilene, TX	L 12–42		
September 21	Southern	Robertson Stadium; Houston, TX	L 0–63		
September 28	vs. Grambling State	Cotton Bowl; Dallas, TX (State Fair Classic)	L 12–54	57,335	
October 5	at Langston*	Anderson Stadium; Langston, OK	L 20–37		
October 12	Alcorn State	Edward L. Blackshear Field; Prairie View, TX	L 0–24		
October 19	Alabama State	Edward L. Blackshear Field; Prairie View, TX	L 15–31		
November 2	at Mississippi Valley State	Magnolia Stadium; Itta Bena, MS	L 0–20		
November 9	Midwestern State*	Edward L. Blackshear Field; Prairie View, TX	L 14–20	8,451	
November 16	at No. 9 Jackson State	Mississippi Veterans Memorial Stadium; Jackson, MS	L 20–76	4,020	
*Non-conference game; Rankings from The Sports Network Poll released prior to the game
