= 1996 Mississippi Valley State Delta Devils football team =

American college football season

1996 Mississippi Valley State Delta Devils football
- Conference: Southwestern Athletic Conference
- Record: 7–4 (5–2 SWAC)
- Head coach: Larry Dorsey (7th season)
- Home stadium: Magnolia Stadium

1996 Southwestern Athletic Conference football standings
	Conf.			Overall
Team	W		L	W		L
No. T–8 Jackson State $^	6	–	1	10	–	2
Southern	5	–	2	7	–	5
Mississippi Valley State	5	–	2	7	–	4
Texas Southern	5	–	2	7	–	4
Alcorn State	3	–	4	4	–	7
Grambling State	2	–	5	3	–	8
Alabama State	2	–	5	3	–	8
Prairie View A&M	0	–	7	0	–	11
$ – Conference champion; ^ – NCAA Division I-AA playoff participant; Rankings from The Sports Network Poll

The 1996 Mississippi Valley State Delta Devils football team represented Mississippi Valley State University as a member of the Southwestern Athletic Conference (SWAC) during the 1996 NCAA Division I-AA football season. Led by seventh-year head coach Larry Dorsey, the Delta Devils compiled an overall record of 7–4, with a conference record of 5–2, and finished tied for second in the SWAC.

== Schedule ==
Date	Opponent	Site	Result	Attendance	Source
September 1	vs. Morris Brown*	Georgia Dome; Atlanta, GA (Labor Day Classic)	W 13–3		
September 7	Arkansas–Pine Bluff*	Magnolia Stadium; Itta Bena, MS	L 20–33	6,750	
September 21	at Chattanooga*	Chamberlain Field; Chattanooga, TN	L 7–26	2,917	
September 28	at No. 6 Jackson State	Mississippi Veterans Memorial Stadium; Jackson, MS	L 13–39	16,687	
October 5	at Southern	A. W. Mumford Stadium; Baton Rouge, LA	L 0–24		
October 12	Grambling State	Magnolia Stadium; Itta Bena, MS	W 19–10	6,500	
October 19	Lane*^{†}	Magnolia Stadium; Itta Bena, MS	W 24–22	10,100	
October 26	at Texas Southern	Rice Stadium; Houston, TX	W 23–17		
November 2	Prairie View A&M	Magnolia Stadium; Itta Bena, MS	W 20–0		
November 9	Alcorn State	Magnolia Stadium; Itta Bena, MS	W 16–9		
November 16	at Alabama State	Cramton Bowl; Montgomery, AL	W 25–20		
*Non-conference game; ^{†}Homecoming; Rankings from The Sports Network Poll released prior to the game
