= 1996 Southwest Texas State Bobcats football team =

American college football season

1996 Southwest Texas State Bobcats football
- Conference: Southland Football League
- Record: 5–6 (2–4 Southland)
- Head coach: Jim Bob Helduser (5th season)
- Home stadium: Bobcat Stadium

1996 Southland Football League standings
	Conf.			Overall
Team	W		L	W		L
No. 5 Troy State $^	5	–	1	12	–	2
No. 19 Nicholls State ^	4	–	2	8	–	4
No. 22 Stephen F. Austin	3	–	3	7	–	4
Northwestern State	3	–	3	6	–	5
Sam Houston State	3	–	3	4	–	7
Southwest Texas State	2	–	4	5	–	6
McNeese State	1	–	5	3	–	8
$ – Conference champion; ^ – NCAA Division I-AA playoff participant; Rankings from The Sports Network poll

The 1996 Southwest Texas State Bobcats football team was an American football team that represented Southwest Texas State University (now known as Texas State University) during the 1996 NCAA Division I-AA football season as a member of the Southland Football League. In their fifth year under head coach Jim Bob Helduser, the team compiled an overall record of 5–6 with a mark of 2–4 in conference play.

== Schedule ==
Date	Opponent	Site	Result	Attendance	Source
August 31	Grand Valley State*	Bobcat Stadium; San Marcos, TX	W 19–14		
September 14	No. 8 Hofstra*	Bobcat Stadium; San Marcos, TX	W 28–13	6,609	
September 21	at Eastern Washington*	Woodward Field; Cheney, WA	L 7–38		
September 28	Idaho*	Bobcat Stadium; San Marcos, TX	W 27–21	7,047	
October 12	at Southern Utah*	Eccles Coliseum; Cedar City, UT	L 27–41		
October 19	at No. 6 Troy State	Veterans Memorial Stadium; Troy, AL	L 13–24		
October 26	Nicholls State	Bobcat Stadium; San Marcos, TX (rivalry)	L 36–49 ^{5OT}		
November 2	Northwestern State	Bobcat Stadium; San Marcos, TX	L 0–49		
November 9	at McNeese State	Cowboy Stadium; Lake Charles, LA	W 16–13		
November 16	No. 7 Stephen F. Austin	Bobcat Stadium; San Marcos, TX	W 31–19		
November 23	at Sam Houston State	Bowers Stadium; Huntsville, TX (rivalry)	L 17–29		
*Non-conference game; Rankings from The Sports Network Poll released prior to the game
