= 1996 Grambling State Tigers football team =

American college football season

1996 Grambling State Tigers football
- Conference: Southwestern Athletic Conference
- Record: 3–8 (2–5 SWAC)
- Head coach: Eddie Robinson (54th season)
- Home stadium: Eddie G. Robinson Memorial Stadium

1996 Southwestern Athletic Conference football standings
	Conf.			Overall
Team	W		L	W		L
No. T–8 Jackson State $^	6	–	1	10	–	2
Southern	5	–	2	7	–	5
Mississippi Valley State	5	–	2	7	–	4
Texas Southern	5	–	2	7	–	4
Alcorn State	3	–	4	4	–	7
Grambling State	2	–	5	3	–	8
Alabama State	2	–	5	3	–	8
Prairie View A&M	0	–	7	0	–	11
$ – Conference champion; ^ – NCAA Division I-AA playoff participant; Rankings from The Sports Network Poll

The 1996 Grambling State Tigers football team represented Grambling State University as a member of the Southwestern Athletic Conference (SWAC) during the 1996 NCAA Division I-AA football season. Led by 54th-year head coach Eddie Robinson, the Tigers compiled an overall record of 3–8 and a mark of 2–5 in conference play, and finished tied for sixth in the SWAC.

== Schedule ==
Date	Opponent	Site	Result	Attendance	Source
September 7	Alcorn State	Eddie G. Robinson Memorial Stadium; Grambling, LA	L 6–31	21,787	
September 14	vs. Central State (OH)*	Pontiac Silverdome; Pontiac, MI (Motor City Classic)	L 7–20	8,000	
September 21	Langston*	Eddie G. Robinson Memorial Stadium; Grambling, LA	L 14–15	4,924	
September 28	vs. Prairie View A&M	Cotton Bowl; Dallas, TX (rivalry)	W 54–12	57,335	
October 12	at Mississippi Valley State	Magnolia Stadium; Itta Bena, MS	L 10–19	6,500	
October 19	vs. Arkansas–Pine Bluff*	Independence Stadium; Shreveport. LA (Red River Classic)	W 32–15	27,000	
October 26	Jackson State	Eddie G. Robinson Memorial Stadium; Grambling, LA	L 0–52	8,042	
November 2	at Texas Southern	Houston Astrodome; Houston, TX	L 7–20		
November 9	Alabama State^{†}	Eddie G. Robinson Memorial Stadium; Grambling, LA	W 7–0	14,974	
November 16	at North Carolina A&T*	Aggie Stadium; Greensboro, NC	L 12–17	9,770	
November 30	vs. Southern	Louisiana Superdome; New Orleans, LA (Bayou Classic)	L 12–17	69,387	
*Non-conference game; ^{†}Homecoming
