= 1996 Alabama State Hornets football team =

American college football season

1996 Alabama State Hornets football
- Conference: Southwestern Athletic Conference
- Record: 3–8 (2–5 SWAC)
- Head coach: Houston Markham (10th season)
- Home stadium: Cramton Bowl

1996 Southwestern Athletic Conference football standings
	Conf.			Overall
Team	W		L	W		L
No. T–8 Jackson State $^	6	–	1	10	–	2
Southern	5	–	2	7	–	5
Mississippi Valley State	5	–	2	7	–	4
Texas Southern	5	–	2	7	–	4
Alcorn State	3	–	4	4	–	7
Grambling State	2	–	5	3	–	8
Alabama State	2	–	5	3	–	8
Prairie View A&M	0	–	7	0	–	11
$ – Conference champion; ^ – NCAA Division I-AA playoff participant; Rankings from The Sports Network Poll

The 1996 Alabama State Hornets football team represented Alabama State University as a member of the Southwestern Athletic Conference (SWAC) during the 1996 NCAA Division I-AA football season. Led by tenth-year head coach Houston Markham, the Hornets compiled an overall record of 3–8, with a mark of 2–5 in conference play, and finished tied for sixth in the SWAC.

== Schedule ==
Date	Opponent	Site	Result	Attendance	Source
September 1	vs. No. 15 Jackson State	Legion Field; Birmingham, AL (Labor Day Classic)	L 0–40	47,359	
September 7	Texas Southern	Cramton Bowl; Montgomery, AL	L 3–10		
September 14	at Southern	A. W. Mumford Stadium; Baton Rouge, LA	W 16–14		
September 21	at Alcorn State	Jack Spinks Stadium; Lorman, MS	L 7–31		
October 3	at No. 9 Troy State*	Veterans Memorial Stadium; Troy, AL	L 6–37		
October 12	vs. Clark Atlanta*	Ladd Stadium; Mobile, AL (Gulf Coast Classic)	W 35–28		
October 19	at Prairie View A&M	Edward L. Blackshear Field; Prairie View, TX	W 31–15		
October 26	vs. Alabama A&M*	Legion Field; Birmingham, AL (Magic City Classic)	L 3–20		
November 9	at Grambling State	Eddie G. Robinson Memorial Stadium; Grambling, LA	L 0–7	14,974	
November 16	Mississippi Valley State	Cramton Bowl; Montgomery, AL	L 20–25		
November 28	Tuskegee*	Cramton Bowl; Montgomery, AL (Turkey Day Classic)	L 14–21		
*Non-conference game; Rankings from The Sports Network Poll released prior to the game
