= 1996 UMass Minutemen football team =

American college football season

1996 UMass Minutemen football
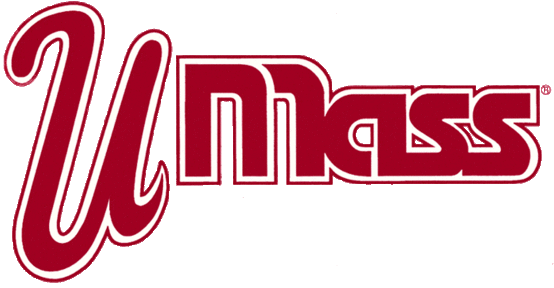
- Conference: Yankee Conference
- New England Division
- Record: 6–5 (4–4 Yankee)
- Head coach: Mike Hodges (5th season)
- Defensive coordinator: Ted Roof (2nd season)
- Home stadium: Warren McGuirk Alumni Stadium

1996 Yankee Conference football standings
	Conf.			Overall
Team	W		L	W		L
New England Division
No. 18 New Hampshire x	6	–	2	8	–	3
Maine	5	–	3	7	–	4
UMass	4	–	4	6	–	5
Connecticut	3	–	5	4	–	6
Rhode Island	2	–	6	4	–	6
Boston University	0	–	8	1	–	10
Mid-Atlantic Division
No. 7 William & Mary x$^	7	–	1	10	–	3
No. 14 Villanova ^	6	–	2	8	–	4
No. 11 Delaware ^	6	–	2	8	–	4
No. 23 James Madison	5	–	3	7	–	4
Northeastern	3	–	5	6	–	5
Richmond	1	–	7	2	–	9
$ – Conference champion; x – Division champion/co-champions; ^ – NCAA Division I-AA playoff participant; Rankings from The Sports Network poll

The 1996 UMass Minutemen football team represented the University of Massachusetts Amherst in the 1996 NCAA Division I-AA football season as a member of the Atlantic 10 Conference. The team was coached by Mike Hodges and played its home games at Warren McGuirk Alumni Stadium in Hadley, Massachusetts. UMass finished the season with a record of 6–5 overall and 4–4 in conference play.

== Schedule ==
Date	Time	Opponent	Site	Result	Attendance	Source
September 7	1:00 p.m.	at Villanova	Villanova Stadium; Villanova, PA	L 14–50	6,207	
September 14	1:00 p.m.	at Holy Cross*	Fitton Field; Worcester, MA	W 28–10	8,770	
September 21	1:00 p.m.	at Richmond	UR Stadium; Richmond, VA	W 23–17 ^{OT}	15,237	
September 28	12:00 p.m.	Northeastern	Warren McGuirk Alumni Stadium; Hadley, MA	W 21–14	12,206	
October 5	1:00 p.m.	at Rhode Island	Meade Stadium; Kingston, RI	L 21–41	5,390	
October 12	1:00 p.m.	Boston University	Warren McGuirk Alumni Stadium; Hadley, MA	W 43–12	15,201	
October 19	1:00 p.m.	Buffalo*^{†}	Warren McGuirk Alumni Stadium; Hadley, MA (rivalry)	W 41–20	8,819	
October 26	12:30 p.m.	at No. 24 New Hampshire	Cowell Stadium; Durham, NH (rivalry)	L 7–40	5,317	
November 2	12:30 p.m.	Maine	Warren McGuirk Alumni Stadium; Hadley, MA	L 14–22	6,251	
November 9	1:00 p.m.	at No. 13 William & Mary	Zable Stadium; Williamsburg, VA	L 6–30	6,867	
November 16	12:30 p.m.	Connecticut	Warren McGuirk Alumni Stadium; Hadley, MA (rivalry)	W 39–38	7,216	
*Non-conference game; ^{†}Homecoming; Rankings from The Sports Network Poll released prior to the game; All times are in Eastern time
