= 1996 Maine Black Bears football team =

American college football season

1996 Maine Black Bears football
- Conference: Yankee Conference
- Record: 7–4 (5–3 Yankee)
- Head coach: Jack Cosgrove (4th season)
- Offensive coordinator: Joe Gilbert (1st season)
- Defensive coordinator: Neil McGrath (2nd season)
- Captains: Mike Flynn; Mitch Maury; Todd Williamson
- Home stadium: Alumni Field

1996 Yankee Conference football standings
	Conf.			Overall
Team	W		L	W		L
New England Division
No. 18 New Hampshire x	6	–	2	8	–	3
Maine	5	–	3	7	–	4
UMass	4	–	4	6	–	5
Connecticut	3	–	5	4	–	6
Rhode Island	2	–	6	4	–	6
Boston University	0	–	8	1	–	10
Mid-Atlantic Division
No. 7 William & Mary x$^	7	–	1	10	–	3
No. 14 Villanova ^	6	–	2	8	–	4
No. 11 Delaware ^	6	–	2	8	–	4
No. 23 James Madison	5	–	3	7	–	4
Northeastern	3	–	5	6	–	5
Richmond	1	–	7	2	–	9
$ – Conference champion; x – Division champion/co-champions; ^ – NCAA Division I-AA playoff participant; Rankings from The Sports Network poll

The 1996 Maine Black Bears football team represented the University of Maine in the 1996 NCAA Division I-AA football season. They were led by fourth-year head coach Jack Cosgrove and finished the season with record of 7–4 and a 5–3 mark in the Yankee Conference.

== Schedule ==
Date	Time	Opponent	Site	Result	Attendance	Source
August 29		at Northeastern	Parsons Field; Brookline, MA	L 21–22		
September 7		at Fordham*	Coffey Field; Bronx, NY	W 24–13	3,725	
September 14		Boston University	Alumni Field; Orono, ME	W 45–8		
September 21		Rhode Island	Alumni Field; Orono, ME	W 58–19		
September 28		No. 11 Delaware	Alumni Field; Orono, ME	L 17–27		
October 5		at No. 23 James Madison	Bridgeforth Stadium; Harrisonburg, VA	L 7–31		
October 12		at No. 18 Connecticut	Memorial Stadium; Storrs, CT	W 17–16		
October 19		No. 18 New Hampshire	Alumni Field; Orono, ME (Battle for the Brice–Cowell Musket)	W 34–20		
November 2	12:30 p.m.	at UMass	Warren McGuirk Alumni Stadium; Hadley, MA	W 22–14	6,251	
November 9		at Hofstra*	James M. Shuart Stadium; Hempstead, NY	W 9–7		
November 16	1:30 p.m.	Buffalo*	Alumni Field; Orono, ME	L 31–35	3,107	
*Non-conference game; Rankings from The Sports Network Poll released prior to the game; All times are in Eastern time

== Roster ==
1996 Maine Black Bears football team roster
Players
Coaches
Offense

Pos.	#	Name	Class
TE	85	Brad Bolduc	So
C	68	Billy Cole	So
QB	11	Mickey Fein	So
OT	70	Mike Flynn	Sr
WR	1	Drew O'Connor	Jr
WR	7	John Tennett	Jr

Defense

Pos.	#	Name	Class
SS	16	Mike Long	Jr

Special teams

Pos.	#	Name	Class

Head coach

- Jack Cosgrove

Coordinators/assistant coaches

- Jow Gilbert OC/OL
- Ben Sirmans (RB/RC)

Legend

- (C) Team captain
- (S) Suspended
- (I) Ineligible
- Injured
- Redshirt

Roster
Last update: 1996-12-25

== Team players in the NFL ==
No Maine players were selected in the 1997 NFL draft.

The following finished their college career in 1996, were not drafted, but played in the NFL.

Player	Position	First NFL team
Mike Flynn	Tackle	Baltimore Ravens
