= Alex Wood (American football) =

American football player and coach (born 1955)

John Carroll Blue Streaks
- Title: Tight ends coach

Personal information
- Born: March 14, 1955 (age 71); Massillon, Ohio, U.S.

Career information
- College: Iowa (1975–1977)
- NFL draft: 1978: undrafted

Career history
- Iowa (1978) Graduate assistant; Kent State (1979–1980) Wide receivers coach; Southern Illinois (1981) Defensive backs coach; Southern (1982–1984) Defensive coordinator; Wyoming (1985–1986) Wide receivers coach & tight ends coach; Washington State (1987–1988) Tight ends coach; Miami (FL) (1989–1992) Running backs coach; Wake Forest (1993–1994) Offensive coordinator & quarterbacks coach; James Madison (1995–1998) Head coach; Minnesota Vikings (1999–2002) Quarterbacks coach; Cincinnati Bengals (2003) Wide receivers coach; Arizona Cardinals (2004) Offensive coordinator; Arkansas (2006–2007) Quarterbacks coach; Miami (OH) (2010) Wide receivers coach; Buffalo (2011–2014) Offensive coordinator, quarterbacks coach & wide receivers coach; Buffalo (2014) Interim head coach; Florida A&M (2015–2017) Head coach; Delaware (2018–2020) Quarterbacks coach & wide receivers coach; Pittsburgh Maulers (2023–2024) Wide receivers coach; Delaware (2024–2025) Quarterbacks coach & wide receivers coach; John Carroll (2026–present) Tight ends coach

Head coaching record
- Regular season: 32–47 (.405)
- Postseason: 0–0 (–)
- Career: 32–47 (.405)

Alexander Von Wood (born March 14, 1955) is an American football coach. He is the tight ends coach for John Carroll University, a position he has held since 2026. Wood served as the head football coach at James Madison University from 1995 to 1998 and Florida A&M University from 2015 to 2017. He won two national championships as an assistant coach at the University of Miami in 1989 and 1991.

Wood played for the Iowa Hawkeyes from 1975 to 1977 as a running back and special teams player. He graduated from Iowa in 1979 with a degree in secondary education and social studies. He also began his coaching career as a student assistant at his alma mater in 1978. He has over 30 years in coaching experience at both the college and National Football League (NFL) ranks.

== Personal life ==
Wood, from Massillon, Ohio, played football and wrestled at Massillon Washington High School. He and his wife, Rosa, have three children – Jerrel, Alex and Natalie.

== Head coaching record ==
Year	Team	Overall	Conference	Standing	Bowl/playoffs
James Madison Dukes (Yankee Conference) (1995–1996)
1995	James Madison	8–4	6–2	T–2nd (Mid-Atlantic)	
1996	James Madison	7–4	5–3	T–5th (Mid-Atlantic)	
James Madison Dukes (Atlantic 10 Conference) (1997–1998)
1997	James Madison	5–6	3–5	10th (Mid-Atlantic)	
1998	James Madison	3–8	2–6	T–10th (Mid-Atlantic)	
James Madison:		23–22	16–16		
Buffalo Bulls (Note: Wood served as interim head coach after Jeff Quinn was fired during the season.) (Mid-American Conference) (2014)
2014	Buffalo	2–2	2–2	3rd (East)	
Buffalo:		2–2	2–2		
Florida A&M Rattlers (Mid-Eastern Athletic Conference) (2015–2017)
2015	Florida A&M	1–10	1–7	T–8th	
2016	Florida A&M	4–7	4–4	T–5th	
2017	Florida A&M	3–8	2–6	T–8th	
Florida A&M:		8–25	7–17		
Total:		33–49			
