= 1996 Boston University Terriers football team =

American college football season

1996 Boston University Terriers football
- Conference: Yankee Conference
- New England Division
- Record: 1–10 (0–8 Yankee)
- Head coach: Tom Masella (1st season)
- Home stadium: Nickerson Field

1996 Yankee Conference football standings
	Conf.			Overall
Team	W		L	W		L
New England Division
No. 18 New Hampshire x	6	–	2	8	–	3
Maine	5	–	3	7	–	4
UMass	4	–	4	6	–	5
Connecticut	3	–	5	4	–	6
Rhode Island	2	–	6	4	–	6
Boston University	0	–	8	1	–	10
Mid-Atlantic Division
No. 7 William & Mary x$^	7	–	1	10	–	3
No. 14 Villanova ^	6	–	2	8	–	4
No. 11 Delaware ^	6	–	2	8	–	4
No. 23 James Madison	5	–	3	7	–	4
Northeastern	3	–	5	6	–	5
Richmond	1	–	7	2	–	9
$ – Conference champion; x – Division champion/co-champions; ^ – NCAA Division I-AA playoff participant; Rankings from The Sports Network poll

The 1996 Boston University Terriers football team was an American football team that represented Boston University as a member of the Yankee Conference during the 1996 NCAA Division I-AA football season. The Terriers compiled a 1–10 record (0–8 against conference opponents), finished last in the Yankee Conference's New England Division, and were outscored by a total of 373 to 119.

The school hired Tom Masella as its head football coach in December 1995. He had previously been an assistant coach under Dan Allen before leaving in 1995 to become head football coach at Fairfield University.

== Schedule ==
Date	Opponent	Site	Result	Attendance	Source
September 7	at Saint Mary's	Saint Mary's Stadium; Moraga, CA	L 23–27		
September 14	at Maine	Alumni Field; Orono, ME	L 8–45		
September 21	No. 23 James Madison	Nickerson Field; Boston, MA	L 7–38		
September 28	Richmond	Nickerson Field; Boston, MA	L 7–37		
October 5	at No. 5 Delaware	Delaware Stadium; Newark, DE	L 16–50		
October 12	at UMass	Warren McGuirk Alumni Stadium; Hadley, MA	L 12–43	15,201	
October 19	Hofstra	Nickerson Field; Boston, MA	W 16–9		
October 26	at Rhode Island	Meade Stadium; Kingston, RI	L 7–38		
November 2	Connecticut	Nickerson Field; Boston, MA	L 10–45		
November 9	Northeastern	Nickerson Field; Boston, MA	L 3–10		
November 16	No. 15 New Hampshire	Nickerson Field; Boston, MA	L 10–31		
Rankings from The Sports Network Poll released prior to the game
