= Ben Sirmans =

American football player and coach (born 1970)

Green Bay Packers
- Title: Running backs coach

Personal information
- Born: October 17, 1970 (age 56); East Orange, New Jersey, U.S.

Career information
- Position: Running back
- High school: Immaculate Conception
- College: Maine

Career history
- Barringer HS (NJ) (1993–1995) Assistant head coach & offensive coordinator; Maine (1996–1999) Running backs coach & recruiting coordinator; Kent State (2000–2004) Running backs coach; Michigan State (2005) Running backs coach; Michigan State (2006) Special teams coordinator & running backs coach; Boston College (2007–2011) Running backs coach; St. Louis Rams (2012–2015) Running backs coach; Green Bay Packers (2016–present) Running backs coach

Ben Sirmans (born October 17, 1970) is an American football coach and former running back who is the running backs coach for the Green Bay Packers of the National Football League (NFL).

Raised in East Orange, New Jersey, Sirmans played prep football at Immaculate Conception High School.

== Playing career ==
Sirmans was the starting running back for the Black Bears from 1990 to 1993 playing three of those seasons under coach Kirk Ferentz. During his senior season he ran for over 1,000 yards and earned all-conference and All-New England honors. He graduated from with a degree in physical education, health and recreation.

== Coaching career ==
=== College ===
After three years of working as the assistant head coach at Barringer High School in Newark, New Jersey (where he also coached the offense and special teams), Sirmans returned to his alma mater. Between 1996 and 1999 he was the Black Bear's running backs coach and recruiting coordinator under Jack Cosgrove. In 2000 he went to Kent State to be the Golden Flashes' running backs coach under Dean Pees, and was retained by Doug Martin for the 2004 season. On February 9, 2005 it was announced that Sirmans would be going to Michigan State to serve as the running backs coach replacing Reggie Mitchell. In 2006 he was given the additional title of special teams coordinator. Sirmans would then go on to Boston College in 2007 staying there until 2011 as running backs coach. During his time with the Eagles one of the players he recruited was Luke Kuechly. In 2012 it was announced that he was becoming Rutgers running backs coach, however it never came into fruition, because Sirmans made the jump to the NFL.

=== NFL ===
In 2012 joined the St. Louis Rams as the team's running backs coach. However he would not make the move to Los Angeles with them as he left the organization after the 2015 season. He was the hired by the Green Bay Packers on February 17, 2016. With the changing of coaching staff he was retained by Matt LaFleur on January 31, 2019.

== Personal life ==
Ben is married to Letia Thompson of Akron, Ohio and the couple has a son named Marcus.
