= 1996 Alcorn State Braves football team =

American college football season

1996 Alcorn State Braves football
- Conference: Southwestern Athletic Conference
- Record: 4–7 (3–4 SWAC)
- Head coach: Cardell Jones (6th season)
- Home stadium: Jack Spinks Stadium

1996 Southwestern Athletic Conference football standings
	Conf.			Overall
Team	W		L	W		L
No. T–8 Jackson State $^	6	–	1	10	–	2
Southern	5	–	2	7	–	5
Mississippi Valley State	5	–	2	7	–	4
Texas Southern	5	–	2	7	–	4
Alcorn State	3	–	4	4	–	7
Grambling State	2	–	5	3	–	8
Alabama State	2	–	5	3	–	8
Prairie View A&M	0	–	7	0	–	11
$ – Conference champion; ^ – NCAA Division I-AA playoff participant; Rankings from The Sports Network Poll

The 1996 Alcorn State Braves football team represented Alcorn State University as a member of the Southwestern Athletic Conference (SWAC) during the 1996 NCAA Division I-AA football season. Led by sixth-year head coach Cardell Jones, the Braves compiled an overall record of 4–7, with a conference record of 3–4, and finished fifth in the SWAC.

== Schedule ==
Date	Opponent	Site	Result	Attendance	Source
August 31	No. 10 Troy State*	Jack Spinks Stadium; Lorman, MS	L 7–61		
September 7	at Grambling State	Eddie G. Robinson Memorial Stadium; Grambling, LA	W 31–6	21,787	
September 14	at Western Illinois*	Hanson Field; Macomb, IL	L 17–34	6,498	
September 21	Alabama State	Jack Spinks Stadium; Lorman, MS	W 31–7		
September 28	at Samford*	Seibert Stadium; Homewood, AL	L 13–14		
October 5	Arkansas–Pine Bluff*	Jack Spinks Stadium; Lorman, MS	W 19–2		
October 12	at Prairie View A&M	Edward L. Blackshear Field; Prairie View, TX	W 24–0		
October 19	Texas Southern	Jack Spinks Stadium; Lorman, MS	L 17–28		
October 26	Southern	Jack Spinks Stadium; Lorman, MS	L 14–21		
November 9	at Mississippi Valley State	Magnolia Stadium; Itta Bena, MS	L 9–16		
November 23	at No. 8 Jackson State	Mississippi Veterans Memorial Stadium; Jackson, MS (Capital City Classic)	L 17–27	62,512	
*Non-conference game; Rankings from The Sports Network Poll released prior to the game
