= 1996 Tennessee State Tigers football team =

American college football season

1996 Tennessee State Tigers football
- Conference: Ohio Valley Conference
- Record: 4–7 (3–5 OVC)
- Head coach: L. C. Cole (1st season)
- Offensive coordinator: Johnnie Cole (1st season)
- Defensive coordinator: Jake Cabell (1st season)
- Home stadium: Hale Stadium; Vanderbilt Stadium

1996 Ohio Valley Conference football standings
	Conf.			Overall
Team	W		L	W		L
No. 4 Murray State $^	8	–	0	11	–	2
No. 16 Eastern Illinois ^	6	–	2	8	–	4
Eastern Kentucky	6	–	2	6	–	5
Middle Tennessee	4	–	4	6	–	5
Tennessee Tech	4	–	4	5	–	6
Tennessee State	3	–	5	4	–	7
Southeast Missouri State	3	–	5	3	–	8
Austin Peay	1	–	7	1	–	10
Tennessee–Martin	1	–	7	1	–	10
$ – Conference champion; ^ – NCAA Division I-AA playoff participant; Rankings from The Sports Network poll

The 1996 Tennessee State Tigers football team represented Tennessee State University as a member of the Ohio Valley Conference (OVC) during the 1996 NCAA Division I-AA football season. Led by first-year head coach L. C. Cole, the Tigers compiled an overall record of 4–7, with a conference record of 3–5, and finished tied for sixth in the OVC.

== Schedule ==
Date	Opponent	Site	Result	Attendance	Source
August 31	Florida A&M*	Vanderbilt Stadium; Nashville, TN	L 20–35	31,782	
September 7	No. 18 Middle Tennessee	Hale Stadium; Nashville, TN	W 24–14		
September 14	vs. No. 10 Jackson State*	Liberty Bowl Memorial Stadium; Memphis, TN (Southern Heritage Classic)	L 14–21	55,212	
September 28	vs. Southern*	Georgia Dome; Atlanta, GA (Atlanta Football Classic)	L 18–19	45,894	
October 5	Lane*	Hale Stadium; Nashville, TN	W 43–26		
October 19	Tennessee–Martin^{†}	Hale Stadium; Nashville, TN	W 37–14	21,331	
October 26	Austin Peay	Hale Stadium; Nashville, TN	W 38–14		
November 2	at Eastern Kentucky	Roy Kidd Stadium; Richmond, KY	L 10–30	9,300	
November 9	at Tennessee Tech	Tucker Stadium; Cookeville, TN	L 19–21		
November 16	at No. 4 Murray State	Roy Stewart Stadium; Murray, KY	L 14–50	6,917	
November 23	Southeast Missouri State	Hale Stadium; Nashville, TN	L 21–24	3,718	
*Non-conference game; ^{†}Homecoming; Rankings from The Sports Network Poll released prior to the game
