= 1996 Dayton Flyers football team =

American college football season

1996 Dayton Flyers football

PFL champion
- Conference: Pioneer Football League

Ranking
- Sports Network: No. 24
- Record: 11–0 (5–0 PFL)
- Head coach: Mike Kelly (16th season)
- Home stadium: Welcome Stadium

1996 Pioneer Football League standings
	Conf.			Overall
Team	W		L	W		L
No. 24 Dayton $	5	–	0	11	–	0
Drake	4	–	1	8	–	3
Evansville	2	–	3	5	–	5
Butler	2	–	3	3	–	7
San Diego	1	–	4	4	–	6
Valparaiso	1	–	4	4	–	6
$ – Conference champion; Rankings from The Sports Network poll

The 1996 Dayton Flyers football team represented the University of Dayton as a member of the Pioneer Football League (PFL) during the 1996 NCAA Division I-AA football season. The team was led by 16th-year head coach Mike Kelly and played their home games at Welcome Stadium in Dayton, Ohio. The Flyers compiled an overall record of 11–0, with a mark of 5–0 in conference play, and finished as PFL champion.

== Schedule ==
Date	Opponent	Site	Result	Attendance	Source
September 7	Morehead State*	Welcome Stadium; Dayton, OH	W 52–6	7,243	
September 14	Georgetown (KY)*	Welcome Stadium; Dayton, OH	W 49–6	7,728	
September 21	Wisconsin–Platteville*	Welcome Stadium; Dayton, OH	W 49–27		
September 28	at Towson State*	Minnegan Stadium; Towson, MD	W 24–17	2,688	
September 3	at Evansville	Arad McCutchan Stadium; Evansville, IN	W 42–0		
October 12	Robert Morris*	Welcome Stadium; Dayton, OH	W 31–21	7,364	
October 19	at Butler	Butler Bowl; Indianapolis, IN	W 30–10		
October 26	Drake	Welcome Stadium; Dayton, OH	W 19–16	8,102	
November 2	at Valparaiso	Brown Field; Valparaiso, IN	W 37–35	3,589	
November 9	Wofford*	Welcome Stadium; Dayton, OH	W 38–14	5,497	
November 16	at San Diego	Torero Stadium; San Diego, CA	W 40–34		
*Non-conference game
