= 1996 Delaware Fightin' Blue Hens football team =

American college football season

1996 Delaware Fightin' Blue Hens football

NCAA Division I-AA First Round, L 14–59 at Marshall
- Conference: Yankee Conference
- Mid-Atlantic Division

Ranking
- Sports Network: No. 11
- Record: 8–4 (6–2 Yankee)
- Head coach: Tubby Raymond (31st season)
- Offensive coordinator: Ted Kempski (29th season)
- Offensive scheme: Delaware Wing-T
- Defensive coordinator: Bob Sabol (6th season)
- Base defense: 4–3
- Home stadium: Delaware Stadium

1996 Yankee Conference football standings
	Conf.			Overall
Team	W		L	W		L
New England Division
No. 18 New Hampshire x	6	–	2	8	–	3
Maine	5	–	3	7	–	4
UMass	4	–	4	6	–	5
Connecticut	3	–	5	4	–	6
Rhode Island	2	–	6	4	–	6
Boston University	0	–	8	1	–	10
Mid-Atlantic Division
No. 7 William & Mary x$^	7	–	1	10	–	3
No. 14 Villanova ^	6	–	2	8	–	4
No. 11 Delaware ^	6	–	2	8	–	4
No. 23 James Madison	5	–	3	7	–	4
Northeastern	3	–	5	6	–	5
Richmond	1	–	7	2	–	9
$ – Conference champion; x – Division champion/co-champions; ^ – NCAA Division I-AA playoff participant; Rankings from The Sports Network poll

The 1996 Delaware Fightin' Blue Hens football team represented the University of Delaware as a member of the Mid-Atlantic Division of the Yankee Conference during the 1996 NCAA Division I-AA football season. Led by 31st-year head coach Tubby Raymond, the Fightin' Blue Hens compiled an overall record of 8–4 with a mark of 6–2 in conference play, tying for second place in the Yankee Conference's Mid-Atlantic Division. Delaware advanced to the NCAA Division I-AA Football Championship playoffs, where the Fightin' Blue Hens lost to the eventual national champion, Marshall, in the first round. The team played home games at Delaware Stadium in Newark, Delaware.

== Schedule ==
Date	Opponent	Rank	Site	Result	Attendance	Source
September 7	Lehigh*	No. 5	Delaware Stadium; Newark, DE (rivalry)	W 49–7	15,520	
September 14	at Villanova	No. 4	Villanova Stadium; Villanova, PA (Battle of the Blue)	L 0–27	12,079	
September 21	No. 8 (D-II) West Chester*	No. 11	Delaware Stadium; Newark, DE (rivalry)	W 24–17		
September 28	at Maine	No. 11	Alumni Field; Orono, ME	W 27–17		
October 5	Boston University	No. 11	Delaware Stadium; Newark, DE	W 50–16		
October 12	at Richmond	No. 11	University of Richmond Stadium; Richmond, VA	W 14–7	7,814	
October 19	Northeastern^{†}	No. 10	Delaware Stadium; Newark, DE	W 24–14		
October 26	No. 10 James Madison	No. 7	Delaware Stadium; Newark, DE (rivalry)	W 27–13		
November 2	at No. 15 William & Mary	No. 6	Zable Stadium; Williamsburg, VA (rivalry)	L 7–10 ^{OT}	8,117	
November 9	at Navy*	No. 12	Navy–Marine Corps Memorial Stadium; Annapolis, MD	L 14–30		
November 16	Rhode Island	No. 13	Delaware Stadium; Newark, DE	W 43–27	14,341	
November 30	at No. 1 Marshall*	No. 11	Marshall University Stadium; Huntington, WV (NCAA Division I-AA First Round)	L 14–59	15,429	
*Non-conference game; ^{†}Homecoming; Rankings from The Sports Network Poll released prior to the game
