= 1996 Murray State Racers football team =

American college football season

1996 Murray State Racers football

OVC champion

NCAA Division I-AA Quarterfinal, L 3–31 vs. Troy State
- Conference: Ohio Valley Conference
- Record: 11–2 (8–0 OVC)
- Head coach: Houston Nutt (4th season)
- Home stadium: Roy Stewart Stadium

1996 Ohio Valley Conference football standings
	Conf.			Overall
Team	W		L	W		L
No. 4 Murray State $^	8	–	0	11	–	2
No. 16 Eastern Illinois ^	6	–	2	8	–	4
Eastern Kentucky	6	–	2	6	–	5
Middle Tennessee	4	–	4	6	–	5
Tennessee Tech	4	–	4	5	–	6
Tennessee State	3	–	5	4	–	7
Southeast Missouri State	3	–	5	3	–	8
Austin Peay	1	–	7	1	–	10
Tennessee–Martin	1	–	7	1	–	10
$ – Conference champion; ^ – NCAA Division I-AA playoff participant; Rankings from The Sports Network poll

The 1996 Murray State Racers football team represented Murray State University in the 1996 NCAA Division I-AA football season. The team was led by fourth-year head coach Houston Nutt and played their home games at Roy Stewart Stadium in Murray, Kentucky. The Racers finished the season with an 11–2 record overall and an undefeated 8–0 record in Ohio Valley Conference games, making them conference champions. They qualified for the NCAA Division I-AA playoffs, where they lost in the quarterfinals to Troy State.

== Schedule ==
Date	Opponent	Rank	Site	Result	Attendance	Source
September 7	Western Kentucky*	No. 9	Roy Stewart Stadium; Murray, KY (Battle for the Red Belt)	L 41–44 ^{OT}	14,123	
September 14	Southern Illinois*	No. 13	Roy Stewart Stadium; Murray, KY	W 43–38	8,023	
September 21	at Southeast Missouri State	No. 12	Houck Stadium; Cape Girardeau, MO	W 16–0	7,538	
September 28	Middle Tennessee	No. 10	Roy Stewart Stadium; Murray, KY	W 34–7	8,612	
October 5	Austin Peay^{†}	No. 10	Roy Stewart Stadium; Murray, KY	W 51–7	14,315	
October 12	at Tennessee–Martin	No. 9	Pacer Stadium; Martin, TN	W 28–14	4,783	
October 19	at No. 14 Eastern Illinois	No. 8	O'Brien Stadium; Charleston, IL	W 35–28	9,387	
November 2	Tennessee Tech	No. 5	Roy Stewart Stadium; Murray, KY	W 41–3	6,193	
November 9	at Eastern Kentucky	No. 4	Roy Kidd Stadium; Richmond, KY	W 17–14	10,400	
November 16	Tennessee State	No. 4	Roy Stewart Stadium; Murray, KY	W 50–14	6,917	
November 23	West Virginia Tech	No. 4	Roy Stewart Stadium; Murray, KY	W 65–0	3,367	
November 30	No. 10 Western Illinois*	No. 4	Roy Stewart Stadium; Murray, KY (NCAA Division I-AA First Round)	W 34–6	2,753	
December 7	at No. 5 Troy State*	No. 4	Veterans Memorial Stadium; Troy, AL (NCAA Division I-AA Quarterfinal)	L 3–31	6,100	
*Non-conference game; ^{†}Homecoming; Rankings from The Sports Network Poll released prior to the game
