= 1996 Villanova Wildcats football team =

American college football season

1996 Villanova Wildcats football

NCAA Division I-AA First Round, L 29–35 at East Tennessee State
- Conference: Yankee Conference

Ranking
- Sports Network: No. 14
- Record: 8–4 (6–2 Yankee)
- Head coach: Andy Talley (12th season)
- Offensive coordinator: Dave Clawson (1st season)
- Defensive coordinator: Dan MacNeill (9th season)
- Home stadium: Villanova Stadium

1996 Yankee Conference football standings
	Conf.			Overall
Team	W		L	W		L
New England Division
No. 18 New Hampshire x	6	–	2	8	–	3
Maine	5	–	3	7	–	4
UMass	4	–	4	6	–	5
Connecticut	3	–	5	4	–	6
Rhode Island	2	–	6	4	–	6
Boston University	0	–	8	1	–	10
Mid-Atlantic Division
No. 7 William & Mary x$^	7	–	1	10	–	3
No. 14 Villanova ^	6	–	2	8	–	4
No. 11 Delaware ^	6	–	2	8	–	4
No. 23 James Madison	5	–	3	7	–	4
Northeastern	3	–	5	6	–	5
Richmond	1	–	7	2	–	9
$ – Conference champion; x – Division champion/co-champions; ^ – NCAA Division I-AA playoff participant; Rankings from The Sports Network poll

The 1996 Villanova Wildcats football team was an American football team that represented the Villanova University as a member of the Yankee Conference during the 1996 NCAA Division I-AA football season. In their 12th year under head coach Andy Talley, the team compiled a 8–4 record.

== Schedule ==
Date	Opponent	Rank	Site	Result	Attendance	Source
August 31	at Rutgers*		Rutgers Stadium; Piscataway, NJ	L 28–38	27,307	
September 7	UMass		Villanova Stadium; Villanova, PA	W 50–14	6,207	
September 14	No. 4 Delaware		Villanova Stadium; Villanova, PA (rivalry)	W 27–0	12,079	
September 21	Fordham*	No. 18	Villanova Stadium; Villanova, PA	W 49–10	12,357	
October 5	at No. 15 Connecticut	No. 13	Memorial Stadium; Storrs, CT	W 38–27	13,596	
October 12	at Northeastern	No. 12	Parsons Field; Brookline, MA	W 42–31	3,100	
October 19	No. 19 William & Mary	No. 9	Villanova Stadium; Villanova, PA	L 21–30	4,733	
October 26	at Richmond	No. 17	University of Richmond Stadium; Richmond, VA	W 20–3	8,841	
November 2	Rhode Island	No. 16	Villanova Stadium; Villanova, PA	W 34–16	7,648	
November 9	at No. 18 New Hampshire	No. 16	Cowell Stadium; Durham, NH	L 0–34	1,231	
November 16	at No. 18 James Madison	No. 21	Bridgeforth Stadium; Harrisonburg, VA	W 40–23	9,500	
November 30	at No. 8 East Tennessee State*	No. 11	Memorial Center; Johnson City, TN (NCAA Division I-AA First Round)	L 29–35	4,939	
*Non-conference game; Rankings from The Sports Network Poll released prior to the game
