= 1996 Northwestern State Demons football team =

American college football season

1996 Northwestern State Demons football
- Conference: Southland Conference
- Record: 6–5 (3–3 SLC)
- Head coach: Sam Goodwin (14th season)
- Offensive coordinator: Steve Mullins (3rd as OC, 7th overall season)
- Defensive coordinator: Bradley Dale Peveto (1st season)
- Home stadium: Harry Turpin Stadium

1996 Southland Football League standings
	Conf.			Overall
Team	W		L	W		L
No. 5 Troy State $^	5	–	1	12	–	2
No. 19 Nicholls State ^	4	–	2	8	–	4
No. 22 Stephen F. Austin	3	–	3	7	–	4
Northwestern State	3	–	3	6	–	5
Sam Houston State	3	–	3	4	–	7
Southwest Texas State	2	–	4	5	–	6
McNeese State	1	–	5	3	–	8
$ – Conference champion; ^ – NCAA Division I-AA playoff participant; Rankings from The Sports Network poll

The 1996 Northwestern State Demons football team was an American football team that represented Northwestern State University as a member of the Southland Conference during the 1996 NCAA Division I-AA football season. In their 14th year under head coach Sam Goodwin, the team compiled an overall record of 6–5, with a mark of 3–3 in conference play, and finished tied for third in the Southland.

== Schedule ==
Date	Time	Opponent	Rank	Site	Result	Attendance	Source
September 7		Southern*		Harry Turpin Stadium; Natchitoches, LA	W 27–10	16,222	
September 21		No. 4 (D-II) Texas A&M–Commerce*		Harry Turpin Stadium; Natchitoches, LA	W 33–7	11,256	
September 28	8:05 p.m.	at Boise State*	No. 22	Bronco Stadium; Boise, ID	W 20–16	18,893	
October 5		at Northeast Louisiana*	No. 19	Malone Stadium; Monroe, LA (rivalry)	L 10–13		
October 12		at Nicholls State	No. 19	John L. Guidry Stadium; Thibodaux, LA (rivalry)	L 7–19		
October 19		Sam Houston State	No. 22	Harry Turpin Stadium; Natchitoches, LA	W 38–21		
October 26		at Youngstown State*	No. 19	Stambaugh Stadium; Youngstown, OH	L 14–24		
November 2		at Southwest Texas State		Bobcat Stadium; San Marcos, TX	W 49–0		
November 9		No. 5 Troy State	No. 19	Harry Turpin Stadium; Natchitoches, LA	L 13–26		
November 16		McNeese State	No. 25	Harry Turpin Stadium; Natchitoches, LA (rivalry)	L 3–20	8,100	
November 23		at No. 14 Stephen F. Austin		Homer Bryce Stadium; Nacogdoches, TX (rivalry)	W 17–10		
*Non-conference game; Rankings from The Sports Network Poll released prior to the game; All times are in Central time
