= 1996 Robert Morris Colonials football team =

American college football season

1996 Robert Morris Colonials football

NEC co-champion ECAC Bowl champion

ECAC Bowl, W 28–26 vs. Duquesne
- Conference: Northeast Conference
- Record: 9–2 (3–1 NEC)
- Head coach: Joe Walton (3rd season)
- Defensive coordinator: Dan Radakovich (2nd season)
- Home stadium: Moon Stadium

1996 Northeast Conference football standings
	Conf.			Overall
Team	W		L	W		L
Robert Morris +	3	–	1	9	–	2
Monmouth +	3	–	1	7	–	3
Central Connecticut State	2	–	2	3	–	7
Wagner	2	–	2	5	–	5
Saint Francis (PA)	0	–	4	3	–	7
+ – Conference co-champions

The 1996 Robert Morris Colonials football team represented Robert Morris College, now Robert Morris University, as a member of the Northeast Conference (NEC) during the 1996 NCAA Division I-AA football season. The Colonials were led by 3rd-year head coach Joe Walton and played their home games at Moon Stadium on the campus of Moon Area High School. The Colonials finished the 1996 season with a share of the NEC championship in their first year in the conference, and an ECAC Bowl victory in only the third year of the program's existence.

== Schedule ==
Date	Opponent	Site	Result	Attendance	Source
September 7	at Mercyhurst*	Mercyhurst Field; Erie, PA	W 20–0	1,850	
September 14	Butler*	Moon Stadium; Moon Township, PA	W 38–0	2,116	
September 21	Towson State*	Moon Stadium; Moon Township, PA	W 7–0	3,756	
September 28	at Central Connecticut State	Arute Field; New Britain, CT	W 35–13	1,875	
October 5	Gannon*	Moon Stadium; Moon Township, PA	W 40–7	2,944	
October 12	at Dayton*	Welcome Stadium; Dayton, OH	L 21–31	7,364	
October 26	Monmouth	Moon Stadium; Moon Township, PA	W 43–6	2,681	
November 2	at Wagner	Wagner College Stadium; Staten Island, NY	L 35–38	551	
November 9	at Saint Francis	Pine Bowl; Loretto, PA	W 16–15	475	
November 16	C.W. Post*	Moon Stadium; Moon Township, PA	W 35–6	964	
November 23	at Duquesne*	Rooney Field; Pittsburgh, PA (ECAC Bowl)	W 28–26	4,321	
*Non-conference game
