= 1996 Troy State Trojans football team =

American college football season

1996 Troy State Trojans football

Southland champion

NCAA Division I-AA Semifinal, L 7–70 at Montana
- Conference: Southland Football League

Ranking
- Sports Network: No. 5
- Record: 12–2 (5–1 Southland)
- Head coach: Larry Blakeney (6th season)
- Offensive coordinator: Don Jacobs (6th season)
- Defensive coordinator: Steve Davis (2nd season)
- Base defense: 4–3
- Home stadium: Veterans Memorial Stadium

1996 Southland Football League standings
	Conf.			Overall
Team	W		L	W		L
No. 5 Troy State $^	5	–	1	12	–	2
No. 19 Nicholls State ^	4	–	2	8	–	4
No. 22 Stephen F. Austin	3	–	3	7	–	4
Northwestern State	3	–	3	6	–	5
Sam Houston State	3	–	3	4	–	7
Southwest Texas State	2	–	4	5	–	6
McNeese State	1	–	5	3	–	8
$ – Conference champion; ^ – NCAA Division I-AA playoff participant; Rankings from The Sports Network poll

The 1996 Troy State Trojans football team represented Troy State University—now known as Troy University—as a member of the Southland Football League during the 1996 NCAA Division I-AA football season. Led by sixth-year head coach Larry Blakeney, the Trojans compiled an overall record of 12–2 with a mark of 5–1 in conference play, winning the Southland title. For the fourth consecutive season, Troy State advanced to the NCAA Division I-AA Football Championship playoffs, where the Trojans beat Florida A&M in the first round and Murray State in the quarterfinals before losing to Montana in the semifinals. They Trojans finished the season ranked No. 5 in the Sports Network poll. The team played home games at Veterans Memorial Stadium in Troy, Alabama.

== Schedule ==
Date	Opponent	Rank	Site	Result	Attendance	Source
August 31	at Alcorn State*	No. 10	Jack Spinks Stadium; Lorman, MS	W 61–7		
September 7	at No. 10 Eastern Kentucky*	No. 8	Roy Kidd Stadium; Richmond, KY	W 40–38		
September 21	Nicholls State	No. 4	Veterans Memorial Stadium; Troy, AL	W 37–7		
September 28	at No. 7 Stephen F. Austin	No. 3	Homer Bryce Stadium; Nacogdoches, TX	L 10–13		
October 3	Alabama State*	No. 9	Veterans Memorial Stadium; Troy, AL	W 37–6		
October 12	McNeese State	No. 8	Veterans Memorial Stadium; Troy, AL	W 16–12	9,500	
October 19	Southwest Texas State	No. 6	Veterans Memorial Stadium; Troy, AL	W 24–13		
October 26	at Jacksonville State*	No. 4	Snow Stadium; Jacksonville, AL (rivalry)	W 31–21	11,500	
November 9	at No. 19 Northwestern State	No. 5	Harry Turpin Stadium; Natchitoches, LA	W 26–13		
November 16	at Sam Houston State	No. 5	Elliot T. Bowers Stadium; Huntsville, TX	W 35–14	5,014	
November 21	Samford*	No. 5	Veterans Memorial Stadium; Troy, AL	W 50–10		
November 30	No. 12 Florida A&M*	No. 5	Veterans Memorial Stadium; Troy, AL (NCAA Division I-AA First Round)	W 29–25	10,200	
December 7	No. 4 Murray State*	No. 5	Veterans Memorial Stadium; Troy, AL (NCAA Division I-AA Quarterfinal)	W 31–3	6,100	
December 14	at No. 2 Montana*	No. 5	Washington–Grizzly Stadium; Missoula, MT (NCAA Division I-AA Semifinal)	L 7–70	18,367	
*Non-conference game; Rankings from The Sports Network Poll released prior to the game
