= 1996 Wagner Seahawks football team =

American college football season

1996 Wagner Seahawks football
- Conference: Northeast Conference
- Record: 5–5 (2–2 NEC)
- Head coach: Walt Hameline (16th season)
- Home stadium: Wagner College Stadium

1996 Northeast Conference football standings
	Conf.			Overall
Team	W		L	W		L
Robert Morris +	3	–	1	9	–	2
Monmouth +	3	–	1	7	–	3
Central Connecticut State	2	–	2	3	–	7
Wagner	2	–	2	5	–	5
Saint Francis (PA)	0	–	4	3	–	7
+ – Conference co-champions

The 1996 Wagner Seahawks football team represented Wagner College in the 1996 NCAA Division I-AA football season as a member of the Northeast Conference (NEC). This year was the team's first season as a member of the Northeast Conference after their transition from being an NCAA Division I-AA independent program. The Seahawks were led by 16th-year head coach Walt Hameline and played their home games at Wagner College Stadium. Wagner finished the season 5–5 overall and 2–2 in NEC play to tie for second place.

== Schedule ==
Date	Opponent	Site	Result	Attendance	Source
September 14	at Iona*	Mazzella Field; New Rochelle, NY	W 27–0		
September 21	C. W. Post*	Wagner College Stadium; Staten Island, NY	W 6-24		
September 28	Marist*	Wagner College Stadium; Staten Island, NY	L 27–28		
October 5	at Saint Francis (PA)	Pine Bowl; Loretto, PA	W 24–6		
October 12	Monmouth	Wagner College Stadium; Staten Island, NY	L 10–23		
October 19	Saint Peter's*	Wagner College Stadium; Staten Island, NY	W 41–12		
October 26	at Central Connecticut State	Arute Field; New Britain, CT	L 41–49		
November 2	Robert Morris	Wagner College Stadium; Staten Island, NY	W 38–35		
November 9	at Stony Brook*	Seawolves Field; Stony Brook, NY	W 27–20	505	
November 16	at Towson State*	Johnny Unitas Stadium; Towson, MD	L 11–35		
*Non-conference game
