= 1996 Stephen F. Austin Lumberjacks football team =

American college football season

1996 Stephen F. Austin Lumberjacks football
- Conference: Southland Conference

Ranking
- Sports Network: No. 22
- Record: 7–4 (3–3 SLC)
- Head coach: John Pearce (5th season)
- Home stadium: Homer Bryce Stadium

1996 Southland Football League standings
| | Conf. | | | Overall |
| Team | W | | L | W | | L |
|---|---|---|---|---|---|---|
| No. 5 Troy State $^ | 5 | – | 1 | 12 | – | 2 |
| No. 19 Nicholls State ^ | 4 | – | 2 | 8 | – | 4 |
| No. 22 Stephen F. Austin | 3 | – | 3 | 7 | – | 4 |
| Northwestern State | 3 | – | 3 | 6 | – | 5 |
| Sam Houston State | 3 | – | 3 | 4 | – | 7 |
| Southwest Texas State | 2 | – | 4 | 5 | – | 6 |
| McNeese State | 1 | – | 5 | 3 | – | 8 |
$ – Conference champion; ^ – NCAA Division I-AA playoff participant; Rankings from The Sports Network poll

The 1996 Stephen F. Austin Lumberjacks football team was an American football team that represented Stephen F. Austin State University as a member of the Southland Conference during the 1996 NCAA Division I-AA football season. In their fifth year under head coach John Pearce, the team compiled an overall record of 7–4, with a mark of 3–3 in conference play, and finished tied for third in the Southland.

== Schedule ==
| Date | Opponent | Rank | Site | Result | Attendance | Source |
|---|---|---|---|---|---|---|
| August 29 | Eastern New Mexico* | No. 5 | Homer Bryce Stadium; Nacogdoches, TX | W 49–13 | | |
| September 7 | Delta State* | No. 4 | Homer Bryce Stadium; Nacogdoches, TX | W 47–16 | | |
| September 14 | at No. 5 Northern Iowa* | No. 3 | UNI-Dome; Cedar Falls, IA | L 12–38 | 11,078 | |
| September 28 | No. 3 Troy State | No. 7 | Homer Bryce Stadium; Nacogdoches, TX | W 13–10 | | |
| October 12 | Sam Houston State | No. 4 | Homer Bryce Stadium; Nacogdoches, TX (rivalry) | L 10–14 | | |
| October 19 | Nicholls State | No. 12 | John L. Guidry Stadium; Thibodaux, LA | W 27–11 | | |
| October 26 | Samford* | No. 12 | Homer Bryce Stadium; Nacogdoches, TX | W 43–14 | | |
| October 29 | at McNeese State | No. 11 | Cowboy Stadium; Lake Charles, LA | W 38–37 | 7,901 | |
| November 9 | Jacksonville State* | No. 9 | Homer Bryce Stadium; Nacogdoches, TX | W 42–10 | 6,217 | |
| November 16 | at Southwest Texas State | No. 7 | Bobcat Stadium; San Marcos, TX | L 19–31 | | |
| November 23 | Northwestern State | No. 14 | Homer Bryce Stadium; Nacogdoches, TX (rivalry) | L 10–17 | | |
*Non-conference game; Rankings from The Sports Network Poll released prior to the game
