= 1996 Rhode Island Rams football team =

American college football season

1996 Rhode Island Rams football
- Conference: Yankee Conference
- New England Division
- Record: 4–6 (2–5 Yankee)
- Head coach: Floyd Keith (4th season)
- Defensive coordinator: Joe Bottiglieri (1st season)
- Home stadium: Meade Stadium

1996 Yankee Conference football standings
	Conf.			Overall
Team	W		L	W		L
New England Division
No. 18 New Hampshire x	6	–	2	8	–	3
Maine	5	–	3	7	–	4
UMass	4	–	4	6	–	5
Connecticut	3	–	5	4	–	6
Rhode Island	2	–	6	4	–	6
Boston University	0	–	8	1	–	10
Mid-Atlantic Division
No. 7 William & Mary x$^	7	–	1	10	–	3
No. 14 Villanova ^	6	–	2	8	–	4
No. 11 Delaware ^	6	–	2	8	–	4
No. 23 James Madison	5	–	3	7	–	4
Northeastern	3	–	5	6	–	5
Richmond	1	–	7	2	–	9
$ – Conference champion; x – Division champion/co-champions; ^ – NCAA Division I-AA playoff participant; Rankings from The Sports Network poll

The 1996 Rhode Island Rams football team was an American football team that represented the University of Rhode Island in the Yankee Conference during the 1996 NCAA Division I-AA football season. In their fourth season under head coach Floyd Keith, the Rams compiled a 4–6 record (2–5 against conference opponents) and finished fourth in the New England Division of the Yankee Conference.

== Schedule ==
Date	Opponent	Rank	Site	Result	Attendance	Source
August 31	American International*	No. 23	Meade Stadium; Kingston, RI	W 49–3	3,719	
September 7	William & Mary	No. 22	Meade Stadium; Kingston, RI	L 16–23	2,131	
September 14	New Hampshire		Meade Stadium; Kingston, RI	L 26–35	2,570	
September 21	at Maine		Alumni Stadium; Orono, ME	L 19–58	3,525	
September 28	Brown*		Meade Stadium; Kingston, RI (rivalry)	W 28–13	3,750	
October 5	UMass		Meade Stadium; Kingston, RI	W 41–21	5,390	
October 19	at No. 24 Connecticut		Memorial Stadium; Storrs, CT	Cancelled		
October 26	Boston University^{†}		Meade Stadium; Kingston, RI	W 38–7	5,000	
November 2	at No. 16 Villanova		Villanova Stadium; Villanova, PA	L 16–34	7,648	
November 16	at No. 13 Delaware		Delaware Stadium; Newark, DE	L 27–43	14,341	
November 23	at Hofstra*		James M. Shuart Stadium; Hempstead, NY	L 0–21	2,451	
*Non-conference game; ^{†}Homecoming; Rankings from The Sports Network Poll released prior to the game
