= 1996 Middle Tennessee Blue Raiders football team =

American college football season

1996 Middle Tennessee Blue Raiders football
- Conference: Ohio Valley Conference
- Record: 6–5 (4–4 OVC)
- Head coach: Boots Donnelly (18th season)
- Offensive coordinator: Tom Fiveash (3rd season)
- Defensive coordinator: Todd Tanney (2nd as DC, 3rd overall season)
- Home stadium: Johnny "Red" Floyd Stadium

1996 Ohio Valley Conference football standings
	Conf.			Overall
Team	W		L	W		L
No. 4 Murray State $^	8	–	0	11	–	2
No. 16 Eastern Illinois ^	6	–	2	8	–	4
Eastern Kentucky	6	–	2	6	–	5
Middle Tennessee	4	–	4	6	–	5
Tennessee Tech	4	–	4	5	–	6
Tennessee State	3	–	5	4	–	7
Southeast Missouri State	3	–	5	3	–	8
Austin Peay	1	–	7	1	–	10
Tennessee–Martin	1	–	7	1	–	10
$ – Conference champion; ^ – NCAA Division I-AA playoff participant; Rankings from The Sports Network poll

The 1996 Middle Tennessee Blue Raiders football team represented Middle Tennessee State University in the 1996 NCAA Division I-AA football season

== Schedule ==
Date	Opponent	Rank	Site	Result	Attendance	Source
August 31	at Louisiana Tech*	No. 13	Joe Aillet Stadium; Ruston, LA	L 0–20	17,912	
September 7	at Tennessee State	No. 18	Hale Stadium; Nashville, TN	L 14–24		
September 14	Chattanooga*		Johnny "Red" Floyd Stadium; Murfreesboro, TN	L 17–26	13,571	
September 28	at No. 10 Murray State		Roy Stewart Stadium; Murray, KY	W 7–34	8,612	
October 5	at Jacksonville State*		Paul Snow Stadium; Jacksonville, AL	W 30–23	12,013	
October 12	Austin Peay State		Johnny "Red" Floyd Stadium; Murfreesboro, TN	W 50–14		
October 19	Eastern Kentucky		Johnny "Red" Floyd Stadium; Murfreesboro, TN	L 13–20		
October 26	at Southeast Missouri State		Houck Stadium; Cape Girardeau, MO	L 13–16 ^{OT}		
November 9	at Tennessee–Martin		Graham Stadium; Martin, TN	W 30–12		
November 16	No. 14 Eastern Illinois		Johnny "Red" Floyd Stadium; Murfreesboro, TN	W 31–24		
November 23	Tennessee Tech		Johnny "Red" Floyd Stadium; Murfreesboro, TN	W 16–10		
*Non-conference game; Rankings from The Sports Network Poll released prior to the game
