= Jack Cosgrove (American football) =

American football player and coach (born 1956)

Current position
- Title: Head coach
- Team: Colby
- Conference: NESCAC
- Record: 26–36

Biographical details
- Born: October 30, 1956 (age 69); Sharon, Massachusetts, U.S.

Playing career
- 1974–1977: Maine
- Position: Quarterback

Coaching career (HC unless noted)
- 1978–1980: Maine (GA)
- 1981–1984: Stoughton HS (MA)
- 1985–1986: Boston College (OA)
- 1987–1988: Maine (QB/WR)
- 1989–1992: Maine (OC)
- 1993–2015: Maine
- 2018–present: Colby

Head coaching record
- Overall: 154–171 (college)
- Tournaments: 3–5 (NCAA D-I-AA/D-I playoffs)

Accomplishments and honors

Championships
- 2 A-10 (2001–2002); 1 CAA (2013)

Awards
- 2× A-10 Coach of the Year (1996, 2001)

Jack Cosgrove (born October 30, 1956) is an American college football coach. He is the head football coach for Colby College, a position he has held since 2018. Cosgrove served as the head football coach at the University of Maine from 1993 to 2015. He is an alumnus of Maine and played college football as a quarterback on the Maine Black Bears football team. Prior to receiving the head coaching position as his alma mater, Cosgrove served as an assistant at Maine and Boston College and was head coach at Stoughton High School.

== Head coaching record ==
=== College ===
Year	Team	Overall	Conference	Standing	Bowl/playoffs	TSN^{#}	Coaches^{°}
Maine Black Bears (Yankee Conference) (1993–1996)
1993	Maine	0–11	0–8	6th (New England)			
1994	Maine	3–8	2–6	T–5th (New England)			
1995	Maine	3–8	1–7	T–5th (New England)			
1996	Maine	7–4	5–3	2nd (New England)			
Maine Black Bears (Atlantic 10 Conference) (1997–2006)
1997	Maine	5–6	4–4	T–2nd (New England)			
1998	Maine	6–5	3–5	T–3rd (New England)			
1999	Maine	4–7	3–5	T–6th			
2000	Maine	5–6	3–5	T–7th			
2001	Maine	9–3	7–2	T–1st	L NCAA Division I-AA Quarterfinal	10	
2002	Maine	11–3	7–2	T–1st	L NCAA Division I-AA Quarterfinal	6	
2003	Maine	6–5	4–4	T–5th			
2004	Maine	5–6	3–5	T–5th			
2005	Maine	5–6	3–5	4th (North)			
2006	Maine	6–5	5–3	T–2nd (North)			
Maine Black Bears (Colonial Athletic Association) (2007–2015)
2007	Maine	4–7	3–5	4th (North)			
2008	Maine	8–5	5–3	2nd (North)	L NCAA Division I First Round		
2009	Maine	5–6	4–4	2nd (North)			
2010	Maine	4–7	3–5	T–8th			
2011	Maine	9–4	6–2	T–2nd	L NCAA Division I Quarterfinal	13	13
2012	Maine	5–6	4–4	7th			
2013	Maine	10–3	7–1	1st	L NCAA Division I Second Round	12	11
2014	Maine	5–6	4–4	T–5th			
2015	Maine	3–8	3–5	T–7th			
Maine:		128–135	89–97				
Colby Mules (New England Small College Athletic Conference) (2018–present)
2018	Colby	3–6	3–6	T–7th			
2019	Colby	2–7	2–7	T–8th			
2020–21	No team—COVID-19						
2021	Colby	4–5	4–5	T–5th			
2022	Colby	4–5	4–5	5th			
2023	Colby	3–5	3–5	7th			
2024	Colby	4–5	4–5	6th			
2025	Colby	6–3	6–3	3rd			
2026	Colby	0–0	0–0				
Colby:		26–36	26–36				
Total:		154–171					
National championship Conference title Conference division title or championship game berth
