= 1996 Connecticut Huskies football team =

American college football season

1996 Connecticut Huskies football
- Conference: Yankee Conference
- New England
- Record: 5–6 (3–5 Yankee)
- Head coach: Skip Holtz (3rd season)
- Offensive coordinator: Todd Fitch (1st season)
- Defensive coordinator: Nick Rapone (2nd season)
- Home stadium: Memorial Stadium

1996 Yankee Conference football standings
	Conf.			Overall
Team	W		L	W		L
New England Division
No. 18 New Hampshire x	6	–	2	8	–	3
Maine	5	–	3	7	–	4
UMass	4	–	4	6	–	5
Connecticut	3	–	5	4	–	6
Rhode Island	2	–	6	4	–	6
Boston University	0	–	8	1	–	10
Mid-Atlantic Division
No. 7 William & Mary x$^	7	–	1	10	–	3
No. 14 Villanova ^	6	–	2	8	–	4
No. 11 Delaware ^	6	–	2	8	–	4
No. 23 James Madison	5	–	3	7	–	4
Northeastern	3	–	5	6	–	5
Richmond	1	–	7	2	–	9
$ – Conference champion; x – Division champion/co-champions; ^ – NCAA Division I-AA playoff participant; Rankings from The Sports Network poll

The 1996 Connecticut Huskies football team represented the University of Connecticut in the 1996 NCAA Division I-AA football season. The Huskies were led by third-year head coach Skip Holtz, and completed the season with a record of 4–6.

== Schedule ==
Date	Opponent	Rank	Site	Result	Attendance	Source
September 7	at Buffalo*	No. 15	University at Buffalo Stadium; Amherst, NY	W 20–3	4,509	
September 14	Northeastern	No. 12	Memorial Stadium; Storrs, CT	W 21–19		
September 21	at New Hampshire	No. 8	Cowell Stadium; Durham, NH	L 13–21		
September 28	at Yale*	No. 16	Yale Bowl; New Haven, CT	W 42–6	27,624	
October 5	No. 13 Villanova	No. 15	Memorial Stadium; Storrs, CT	L 27–38	13,596	
October 12	Maine	No. 18	Memorial Stadium; Storrs, CT	L 16–17		
October 19	Rhode Island	No. 24	Memorial Stadium; Storrs, CT (rivalry)	W 1–0 (Note: Rhode Island forfeited the game due to the suspension of several players. The game did not count in the overall records for either team, although it did count for conference records.)		
October 26	Hofstra*	No. 23	Memorial Stadium; Storrs, CT	L 16–24		
November 2	at Boston University		Nickerson Field; Boston, MA	W 45–10		
November 9	at No. 22 James Madison		Memorial Stadium; Storrs, CT	L 6–14		
November 16	at UMass		Warren McGuirk Alumni Stadium; Amherst, MA (rivalry)	L 38–39	7,216	
*Non-conference game; Rankings from The Sports Network Poll released prior to the game
