= 1996 Eastern Illinois Panthers football team =

American college football season

1996 Eastern Illinois Panthers football

NCAA Division I-AA First Round, L 14–21 vs. Northern Iowa
- Conference: Ohio Valley Conference

Ranking
- Sports Network: No. 16
- Record: 8–4 (6–2 OVC)
- Head coach: Bob Spoo (10th season)
- Offensive coordinator: Roy Wittke (7th season)
- Home stadium: O'Brien Stadium

1996 Ohio Valley Conference football standings
	Conf.			Overall
Team	W		L	W		L
No. 4 Murray State $^	8	–	0	11	–	2
No. 16 Eastern Illinois ^	6	–	2	8	–	4
Eastern Kentucky	6	–	2	6	–	5
Middle Tennessee	4	–	4	6	–	5
Tennessee Tech	4	–	4	5	–	6
Tennessee State	3	–	5	4	–	7
Southeast Missouri State	3	–	5	3	–	8
Austin Peay	1	–	7	1	–	10
Tennessee–Martin	1	–	7	1	–	10
$ – Conference champion; ^ – NCAA Division I-AA playoff participant; Rankings from The Sports Network poll

The 1996 Eastern Illinois Panthers football team represented Eastern Illinois University as a member of the Ohio Valley Conference (OVC) during the 1996 NCAA Division I-AA football season. Led by tenth-year head coach Bob Spoo, the Panthers compiled and overall record of 8–4 with a mark of 6–2 in conference play, tying for second place in the OVC. Eastern Illinois was invited to the NCAA Division I-AA Football Championship playoffs, where they lost to Northern Iowa in the first round.

== Schedule ==
Date	Opponent	Rank	Site	Result	Attendance	Source
August 29	at Western Michigan*	No. 25	Waldo Stadium; Kalamazoo, MI	W 28–20		
September 7	No. 2 (D-II) Pittsburg State*	No. 24	O'Brien Stadium; Charleston, IL	W 41–31		
September 14	Indiana State*	No. 17	O'Brien Stadium; Charleston, IL	W 35–16		
September 28	at Tennessee–Martin	No. 9	Graham Stadium; Martin, TN	W 38–0		
October 12	Western Illinois*	No. 7	O'Brien Stadium; Charleston, IL	L 7–10	10,133	
October 19	No. 8 Murray State	No. 14	O'Brien Stadium; Charleston, IL	L 28–35	9,387	
October 26	at Tennessee Tech	No. 18	Tucker Stadium; Cookeville, TN	W 35–27		
November 2	at Austin Peay	No. 17	Fortera Stadium; Clarksville, TN	W 42–7		
November 9	at Southeast Missouri State	No. 17	Houck Stadium; Cape Girardeau, MO	W 41–21		
November 16	at Middle Tennessee	No. 14	Johnny "Red" Floyd Stadium; Murfreesboro, TN	L 24–31		
November 23	Eastern Kentucky	No. 19	O'Brien Stadium; Charleston, IL	W 45–21		
November 30	at No. 3 Northern Iowa*	No. 16	UNI-Dome; Cedar Falls, IA (NCAA Division I-AA First Round)	L 14–21		
*Non-conference game; Rankings from The Sports Network Poll released prior to the game
