= 1996 James Madison Dukes football team =

American college football season

1996 James Madison Dukes football
- Conference: Yankee Conference
- Mid-Atlantic Division

Ranking
- Sports Network: No. 23
- Record: 7–4 (5–3 Yankee)
- Head coach: Alex Wood (2nd season)
- Offensive coordinator: Kent Schoolfield (2nd season)
- Defensive coordinator: Tim Pendergast (2nd season)
- Home stadium: Bridgeforth Stadium

1996 Yankee Conference football standings
	Conf.			Overall
Team	W		L	W		L
New England Division
No. 18 New Hampshire x	6	–	2	8	–	3
Maine	5	–	3	7	–	4
UMass	4	–	4	6	–	5
Connecticut	3	–	5	4	–	6
Rhode Island	2	–	6	4	–	6
Boston University	0	–	8	1	–	10
Mid-Atlantic Division
No. 7 William & Mary x$^	7	–	1	10	–	3
No. 14 Villanova ^	6	–	2	8	–	4
No. 11 Delaware ^	6	–	2	8	–	4
No. 23 James Madison	5	–	3	7	–	4
Northeastern	3	–	5	6	–	5
Richmond	1	–	7	2	–	9
$ – Conference champion; x – Division champion/co-champions; ^ – NCAA Division I-AA playoff participant; Rankings from The Sports Network poll

The 1996 James Madison Dukes football team represented James Madison University in the 1996 NCAA Division I-AA football season.

== Schedule ==
Date	Opponent	Site	Result	Source
September 7	Shippensburg*	Bridgeforth Stadium; Harrisonburg, VA	W 30–0	
September 14	at McNeese State*	Cowboy Stadium; Lake Charles, LA	W 24–10	
September 21	at Boston University	Nickerson Field; Boston, MA	W 38–7	
September 28	New Hampshire	Bridgeforth Stadium; Harrisonburg, VA	L 22–39	
October 5	Maine	Bridgeforth Stadium; Harrisonburg, VA	W 31–7	
October 12	William & Mary	Bridgeforth Stadium; Harrisonburg, VA	W 26–21	
October 19	at Richmond	City Stadium; Richmond, VA	W 31–27	
October 26	at Delaware	Delaware Stadium; Newark, DE	L 13–27	
November 2	Northeastern	Bridgeforth Stadium; Harrisonburg, VA	L 7–31	
November 9	at Connecticut	Memorial Stadium; Storrs, CT	W 14–9	
November 16	Villanova	Bridgeforth Stadium; Harrisonburg, VA	L 23–40	
*Non-conference game

== Roster ==
1996 James Madison Dukes football team roster
Players
Coaches
Offense

Pos.	#	Name	Class
WR	82	Matt Brown	Jr
OT	63	David Byerly	Sr
FB	35	Akiba Byrd	Sr
WR	17	Macey Brooks	Sr
QB	14	Willie Gonzalez	Sr
TE	89	Ed Perry	Sr

Defense

Pos.	#	Name	Class
LB	11	Tony Jordan	Sr
CB	45	Jeff Judy	Jr
SS	8	David Lee	Sr
DT	96	David Forbes	Sr

Special teams

Pos.	#	Name	Class

Head coach

- Alex Wood

Coordinators/assistant coaches

Legend

- (C) Team captain
- (S) Suspended
- (I) Ineligible
- Injured
- Redshirt

Roster
Last update: 1996-12-25
