= 1996 McNeese State Cowboys football team =

American college football season

1996 McNeese State Cowboys football
- Conference: Southland Conference
- Record: 3–8 (1–5 Southland)
- Head coach: Bobby Keasler (7th season)
- Offensive coordinator: Mike Santiago (7th season)
- Defensive coordinator: Kirby Bruchhaus (7th season)
- Home stadium: Cowboy Stadium

1996 Southland Football League standings
	Conf.			Overall
Team	W		L	W		L
No. 5 Troy State $^	5	–	1	12	–	2
No. 19 Nicholls State ^	4	–	2	8	–	4
No. 22 Stephen F. Austin	3	–	3	7	–	4
Northwestern State	3	–	3	6	–	5
Sam Houston State	3	–	3	4	–	7
Southwest Texas State	2	–	4	5	–	6
McNeese State	1	–	5	3	–	8
$ – Conference champion; ^ – NCAA Division I-AA playoff participant; Rankings from The Sports Network poll

The 1996 McNeese State Cowboys football team was an American football team that represented McNeese State University as a member of the Southland Conference (Southland) during the 1996 NCAA Division I-AA football season. In their seventh year under head coach Bobby Keasler, the team compiled an overall record of 3–8, with a mark of 1–5 in conference play, and finished seventh in the Southland.

== Schedule ==
Date	Opponent	Rank	Site	Result	Attendance	Source
September 7	No. 3 Southwest Missouri State*	No. 21	Cowboy Stadium; Lake Charles, LA	L 7–12	14,059	
September 14	James Madison*		Cowboy Stadium; Lake Charles, LA	L 10–24	12,543	
September 21	Angelo State*		Cowboy Stadium; Lake Charles, LA	W 37–23	8,679	
September 28	at No. 5 Northern Iowa*		UNI-Dome; Cedar Falls, IA	L 10–43	14,692	
October 5	Arkansas–Monticello*		Cowboy Stadium; Lake Charles, LA	W 49–3	6,866	
October 12	at No. 8 Troy State		Veterans Memorial Stadium; Troy, AL	L 12–16	9,500	
October 26	at Sam Houston State		Bowers Stadium; Huntsville, TX	L 25–30		
October 29	No. 11 Stephen F. Austin		Cowboy Stadium; Lake Charles, LA	L 37–38	7,901	
November 9	Southwest Texas State		Cowboy Stadium; Lake Charles, LA	L 13–16		
November 16	at No. 25 Northwestern State		Harry Turpin Stadium; Natchitoches, LA (rivalry)	W 20–3	8,100	
November 23	No. 22 Nicholls State		Cowboy Stadium; Lake Charles, LA	L 16–17	6,121	
*Non-conference game; Rankings from The Sports Network Poll released prior to the game
