= Kevin Callahan =

American football player and coach (born 1955)

Current position
- Title: Special assistant to athletic director
- Team: Monmouth
- Conference: CAA

Biographical details
- Born: February 18, 1955 (age 71); Elmira, New York, U.S.

Playing career
- 1973–1976: Rochester

Coaching career (HC unless noted)
- 1977: Albany (RB)
- 1978–1979: Albany (OLB)
- 1980: Syracuse (RB)
- 1981–1984: Wagner (DC)
- 1984–1991: Colgate (DC)
- 1991: Colgate (AHC)
- 1992–2025: Monmouth

Administrative career (AD unless noted)
- 2026–present: Monmouth (Special Asst. to AD)

Head coaching record
- Overall: 197–151
- Bowls: 0–2
- Tournaments: 1–3 (NCAA D-I playoffs)

Accomplishments and honors

Championships
- 5 NEC (1996, 1998, 2003–2004, 2006); 2 Big South (2019–2020)

Awards
- 2× Big South Coach of the Year (2019–2020)

Kevin Callahan (born February 18, 1955) is an American former college football coach. He was the head football coach at Monmouth University in West Long Branch, New Jersey from 1992 until 2025. The team's first season was in 1993 and Callahan led them to a 2–5 record.

== Head coaching record ==
Year	Team	Overall	Conference	Standing	Bowl/playoffs	STATS^{#}	Coaches^{°}
Monmouth Hawks (NCAA Division I-AA independent) (1993–1995)
1993	Monmouth	2–5					
1994	Monmouth	7–2					
1995	Monmouth	7–3					
Monmouth Hawks (Northeast Conference) (1996–2012)
1996	Monmouth	7–3	3–1	T–1st			
1997	Monmouth	5–4	3–1	2nd			
1998	Monmouth	5–5	4–1	T–1st			
1999	Monmouth	2–8	2–5	6th			
2000	Monmouth	5–6	4–4	5th			
2001	Monmouth	7–3	5–2	T–3rd			
2002	Monmouth	2–8	2–5	T–6th			
2003	Monmouth	10–2	6–1	T–1st	L ECAC Bowl		
2004	Monmouth	10–1	6–1	T–1st			
2005	Monmouth	6–4	4–3	T–3rd			
2006	Monmouth	10–2	6–1	1st	L Gridiron Classic		
2007	Monmouth	4–6	3–3	T–3rd			
2008	Monmouth	7–4	6–1	2nd			
2009	Monmouth	5–6	4–4	T–5th			
2010	Monmouth	3–8	3–5	T–6th			
2011	Monmouth	5–6	4–4	T–4th			
2012	Monmouth	5–5	4–3	3rd			
Monmouth Hawks (NCAA Division I FCS independent) (2013)
2013	Monmouth	6–6					
Monmouth Hawks (Big South Conference) (2014–2021)
2014	Monmouth	6–5	1–4	5th			
2015	Monmouth	5–6	3–3	T–3rd			
2016	Monmouth	4–7	0–5	6th			
2017	Monmouth	9–3	4–1	2nd	L NCAA Division I First Round		
2018	Monmouth	8–3	4–1	2nd			
2019	Monmouth	11–3	6–0	1st	L NCAA Division I Second Round	12	13
2020	Monmouth	3–1	3–0	1st	L NCAA Division I First Round	10	10
2021	Monmouth	7–4	6–1	2nd			
Monmouth Hawks (Colonial Athletic Association) (2022)
2022	Monmouth	5–6	3–5	9th			
Monmouth Hawks (Coastal Athletic Association Football Conference) (2023–2025)
2023	Monmouth	4–7	3–5	T–11th			
2024	Monmouth	6–6	4–4	T–9th			
2025	Monmouth	9–3	6–2	T–3rd		22	20
Monmouth:		197–151	112–75				
Total:		197–151					
National championship Conference title Conference division title or championship game berth
