= 1996 New Hampshire Wildcats football team =

American college football season

1996 New Hampshire Wildcats football

Yankee New England Division champion
- Conference: Yankee Conference
- New England Division

Ranking
- Sports Network: No. 18
- Record: 8–3 (6–2 Yankee)
- Head coach: Bill Bowes (25th season)
- Offensive coordinator: Sean McDonnell (3rd season)
- Home stadium: Cowell Stadium

1996 Yankee Conference football standings
	Conf.			Overall
Team	W		L	W		L
New England Division
No. 18 New Hampshire x	6	–	2	8	–	3
Maine	5	–	3	7	–	4
UMass	4	–	4	6	–	5
Connecticut	3	–	5	4	–	6
Rhode Island	2	–	6	4	–	6
Boston University	0	–	8	1	–	10
Mid-Atlantic Division
No. 7 William & Mary x$^	7	–	1	10	–	3
No. 14 Villanova ^	6	–	2	8	–	4
No. 11 Delaware ^	6	–	2	8	–	4
No. 23 James Madison	5	–	3	7	–	4
Northeastern	3	–	5	6	–	5
Richmond	1	–	7	2	–	9
$ – Conference champion; x – Division champion/co-champions; ^ – NCAA Division I-AA playoff participant; Rankings from The Sports Network poll

The 1996 New Hampshire Wildcats football team was an American football team that represented the University of New Hampshire as a member of the New England Division of the Yankee Conference during the 1996 NCAA Division I-AA football season. In its 25th year under head coach Bill Bowes, the team compiled an 8–3 record (6–2 against conference opponents) and finished in first place in the New England Division.

== Schedule ==
Date	Opponent	Rank	Site	Result	Attendance	Source
September 14	at Rhode Island		Meade Stadium; Kingston, RI	W 35–26	3,719	
September 21	No. 8 Connecticut		Cowell Stadium; Durham, NH	W 21–13		
September 28	at James Madison	No. 25	Bridgeforth Stadium; Harrisonburg, VA	W 39–22		
October 5	at No. 17 William & Mary	No. 20	Zable Stadium; Williamsburg, VA	L 7–31	7,256	
October 12	Lehigh*	No. 24	Cowell Stadium; Durham, NH	W 42–27	7,335	
October 19	at Maine	No. 18	Alumni Stadium; Orono, ME (Battle for the Brice–Cowell Musket)	L 20–34		
October 26	UMass	No. 24	Cowell Stadium; Durham, NH (rivalry)	W 40–7	5,317	
November 2	Richmond	No. 20	Cowell Stadium; Durham, NH	W 14–13	2,837	
November 9	No. 16 Villanova	No. 18	Cowell Stadium; Durham, NH	W 34–0	1,231	
November 16	at Boston University	No. 15	Nickerson Field; Boston, MA	W 31–10		
November 23	at Northeastern	No. 12	Parsons Field; Brookline, MA	L 28–30		
*Non-conference game; Rankings from The Sports Network Poll released prior to the game

== Roster ==
1996 New Hampshire Wildcats football team roster
Players
Coaches
Offense

Pos.	#	Name	Class
QB	14	Mike Apple	Fr
RB	25	Jerry Azumah	So
WR	18	Alister Barrow	Sr

Defense

Pos.	#	Name	Class
DE	91	Matt Champion	Fr
DE	90	Steve Charbonneau	Jr
LB	59	Peter Christopher	Sr

Special teams

Pos.	#	Name	Class

Head coach

- Bill Bowes

Coordinators/assistant coaches

Legend

- (C) Team captain
- (S) Suspended
- (I) Ineligible
- Injured
- Redshirt
