= 1996 William & Mary Tribe football team =

American college football season

1996 William & Mary Tribe football

Yankee champion Yankee Mid-Atlantic Division champion Lambert Cup winner

NCAA Division I-AA Quarterfinal, L 35–38 at Northern Iowa
- Conference: Yankee Conference
- Mid-Atlantic Division

Ranking
- Sports Network: No. 7
- Record: 10–3 (7–1 Yankee)
- Head coach: Jimmye Laycock (17th season)
- Offensive coordinator: Zbig Kepa (4th season)
- Defensive coordinator: Russ Huesman (1st season)
- Captains: Josh Beyer; Stefon Moody; Mike McGowan
- Home stadium: Zable Stadium

1996 Yankee Conference football standings
	Conf.			Overall
Team	W		L	W		L
New England Division
No. 18 New Hampshire x	6	–	2	8	–	3
Maine	5	–	3	7	–	4
UMass	4	–	4	6	–	5
Connecticut	3	–	5	4	–	6
Rhode Island	2	–	6	4	–	6
Boston University	0	–	8	1	–	10
Mid-Atlantic Division
No. 7 William & Mary x$^	7	–	1	10	–	3
No. 14 Villanova ^	6	–	2	8	–	4
No. 11 Delaware ^	6	–	2	8	–	4
No. 23 James Madison	5	–	3	7	–	4
Northeastern	3	–	5	6	–	5
Richmond	1	–	7	2	–	9
$ – Conference champion; x – Division champion/co-champions; ^ – NCAA Division I-AA playoff participant; Rankings from The Sports Network poll

The 1996 William & Mary Tribe football team represented the College of William & Mary as member of the Mid-Atlantic Division of the Yankee Conference during the 1996 NCAA Division I-AA football season. Led by Jimmye Laycock in his 17th year as head coach, William & Mary finished the season with an overall record of 10–3 and a mark of 7–1 in conference play, winning the Yankee Conference and Mid-Atlantic Division titles. They were ranked No. 5 in the final Sports Network poll. The Tribe qualified for the NCAA Division I-AA playoffs, beating Jackson State in the first round before losing to Northern Iowa in the quarterfinals.

== Schedule ==
Date	Opponent	Rank	Site	Result	Attendance	Source
August 29	at UCF*		Florida Citrus Bowl; Orlando, FL	L 33–39	18,013	
September 7	at No. 22 Rhode Island		Meade Stadium; Kingston, RI	W 23–16	2,131	
September 14	VMI*	No. 23	Zable Stadium; Williamsburg, VA (rivalry)	W 40–21	9,614	
September 21	at Bucknell*	No. 22	Christy Mathewson–Memorial Stadium; Lewisburg, PA	W 47–0	4,429	
October 5	No. 20 New Hampshire	No. 17	Zable Stadium; Williamsburg, VA	W 31–7	7,256	
October 12	at No. 17 James Madison	No. 15	Bridgeforth Stadium; Harrisonburg, VA (rivalry)	L 21–26	10,500	
October 19	at No. 9 Villanova	No. 19	Villanova Stadium; Villanova, PA	W 30–21	4,733	
October 26	Northeastern	No. 16	Zable Stadium; Williamsburg, VA	W 21–14	11,373	
November 2	No. 6 Delaware	No. 15	Zable Stadium; Williamsburg, VA (rivalry)	W 10–7 ^{OT}	8,177	
November 9	UMass	No. 13	Zable Stadium; Williamsburg, VA	W 30–6	6,867	
November 16	at Richmond	No. 10	University of Richmond Stadium; Richmond, VA (I-64 Bowl)	W 28–13	11,204	
November 30	No. T–8 Jackson State*	No. 7	Zable Stadium; Williamsburg, VA (NCAA Division I-AA First Round)	W 45–6	4,057	
December 7	at No. 3 Northern Iowa*	No. 7	UNI-Dome; Cedar Falls, IA (NCAA Division I-AA Quarterfinal)	L 35–38	10,796	
*Non-conference game; Rankings from The Sports Network Poll released prior to the game
