= 1996 Southern Jaguars football team =

American college football season

1996 Southern Jaguars football

Heritage Bowl, L 24–27 vs. Howard
- Conference: Southwestern Athletic Conference
- Record: 7–5 (5–2 SWAC)
- Head coach: Pete Richardson (4th season)
- Home stadium: A. W. Mumford Stadium

1996 Southwestern Athletic Conference football standings
	Conf.			Overall
Team	W		L	W		L
No. T–8 Jackson State $^	6	–	1	10	–	2
Southern	5	–	2	7	–	5
Mississippi Valley State	5	–	2	7	–	4
Texas Southern	5	–	2	7	–	4
Alcorn State	3	–	4	4	–	7
Grambling State	2	–	5	3	–	8
Alabama State	2	–	5	3	–	8
Prairie View A&M	0	–	7	0	–	11
$ – Conference champion; ^ – NCAA Division I-AA playoff participant; Rankings from The Sports Network Poll

The 1996 Southern Jaguars football team represented Southern University as a member of the Southwestern Athletic Conference (SWAC) during the 1996 NCAA Division I-AA football season. Led by fourth-year head coach Pete Richardson, the Jaguars compiled an overall record of 7–5, with a conference record of 5–2, and finished tied for second in the SWAC.

== Schedule ==
Date	Opponent	Rank	Site	Result	Attendance	Source
September 7	at Northwestern State*		Harry Turpin Stadium; Natchitoches, LA	L 10–27	16,222	
September 14	Alabama State		A. W. Mumford Stadium; Baton Rouge, LA	L 14–16		
September 21	at Prairie View A&M		Robertson Stadium; Houston, TX	W 63–0		
September 28	vs. Tennessee State*		Georgia Dome; Atlanta, GA (Atlanta Football Classic)	W 19–18	45,894	
October 5	Mississippi Valley State		A. W. Mumford Stadium; Baton Rouge, LA	W 24–0		
October 19	No. 4 Jackson State		A. W. Mumford Stadium; Baton Rouge, LA (rivalry)	W 27–16	24,600	
October 26	at Alcorn State		Jack Spinks Stadium; Lorman, MS	W 21–14		
November 2	at Nicholls State*	No. 25	John L. Guidry Stadium; Thibodaux, LA	L 0–14		
November 9	No. 13 Florida A&M*		A. W. Mumford Stadium; Baton Rouge, LA	W 21–17	15,969	
November 16	Texas Southern		A. W. Mumford Stadium; Baton Rouge, LA	L 30–34		
November 30	vs. Grambling State		Louisiana Superdome; New Orleans, LA (Bayou Classic)	W 17–12	69,387	
December 21	vs. No. 20 Howard*		Georgia Dome; Atlanta, GA (Heritage Bowl)	L 24–27	18,126	
*Non-conference game; Rankings from The Sports Network Poll released prior to the game
