= 1996 Nicholls State Colonels football team =

American college football season

1996 Nicholls State Colonels football

NCAA Division I-AA First Round, L 3–48 vs. Montana
- Conference: Southland Football League
- Record: 8–4 (4–2 Southland)
- Head coach: Darren Barbier (2nd season)
- Defensive coordinator: Manny Michel (2nd season)
- Home stadium: John L. Guidry Stadium

1996 Southland Football League standings
	Conf.			Overall
Team	W		L	W		L
No. 5 Troy State $^	5	–	1	12	–	2
No. 19 Nicholls State ^	4	–	2	8	–	4
No. 22 Stephen F. Austin	3	–	3	7	–	4
Northwestern State	3	–	3	6	–	5
Sam Houston State	3	–	3	4	–	7
Southwest Texas State	2	–	4	5	–	6
McNeese State	1	–	5	3	–	8
$ – Conference champion; ^ – NCAA Division I-AA playoff participant; Rankings from The Sports Network poll

The 1996 Nicholls State Colonels football team represented Nicholls State University as a member of the Southland Football League during the 1996 NCAA Division I-AA football season. Led by second-year head coach Darren Barbier, the Colonels compiled an overall record of 8–4 with mark of 4–2 in conference play, placing second in the Southland. Nicholls State advanced to the NCAA Division I-AA Football Championship playoffs, losing in the first round to eventual national runner-up, Montana. The team played home games at John L. Guidry Stadium in Thibodaux, Louisiana.

== Schedule ==
Date	Opponent	Rank	Site	Result	Attendance	Source
August 29	at Northeast Louisiana*		Malone Stadium; Monroe, LA	L 12–14	13,012	
September 14	Jacksonville State*		John L. Guidry Stadium; Thibodaux, LA	W 21–8	5,749	
September 21	at No. 4 Troy State		Veterans Memorial Stadium; Troy, AL	L 7–37		
October 5	at Samford*		Seibert Stadium; Homewood, AL	W 10–3		
October 12	No. 19 Northwestern State		John L. Guidry Stadium; Thibodaux, LA (rivalry)	W 19–7		
October 19	No. 12 Stephen F. Austin		John L. Guidry Stadium; Thibodaux, LA	L 11–27		
October 26	at Southwest Texas State		Bobcat Stadium; San Marcos, TX (rivalry)	W 49–36 ^{5OT}		
November 2	No. 25 Southern*		John L. Guidry Stadium; Thibodaux, LA	W 14–0		
November 9	Sam Houston State		John L. Guidry Stadium; Thibodaux, LA	W 20–10	2,684	
November 16	Harding*	No. 22	John L. Guidry Stadium; Thibodaux, LA	W 29–19		
November 23	at McNeese State	No. 22	Cowboy Stadium; Lake Charles, LA	W 17–16	6,121	
November 30	at No. 2 Montana	No. 19	Washington–Grizzly Stadium; Missoula, MT (NCAA Division I-AA First Round)	L 3–48	13,428	
*Non-conference game; Rankings from The Sports Network Poll released prior to the game
