= 1996 Jackson State Tigers football team =

American college football season

1996 Jackson State Tigers football

Black college national champion SWAC champion

NCAA Division I-AA First Round, L 6–45 vs. William & Mary
- Conference: Southwestern Athletic Conference

Ranking
- Sports Network: No. T–8
- Record: 10–2 (6–1 SWAC)
- Head coach: James Carson (5th season)
- Home stadium: Mississippi Veterans Memorial Stadium

1996 Southwestern Athletic Conference football standings
	Conf.			Overall
Team	W		L	W		L
No. T–8 Jackson State $^	6	–	1	10	–	2
Southern	5	–	2	7	–	5
Mississippi Valley State	5	–	2	7	–	4
Texas Southern	5	–	2	7	–	4
Alcorn State	3	–	4	4	–	7
Grambling State	2	–	5	3	–	8
Alabama State	2	–	5	3	–	8
Prairie View A&M	0	–	7	0	–	11
$ – Conference champion; ^ – NCAA Division I-AA playoff participant; Rankings from The Sports Network Poll

The 1996 Jackson State Tigers football team represented Jackson State University as a member of the Southwestern Athletic Conference (SWAC) during the 1996 NCAA Division I-AA football season. Led by 5th-year head coach James Carson, the Tigers compiled an overall record of 10–2 and a mark of 6–1 in conference play, and finished as SWAC co-champion. Jackson State finished their season with a loss against William & Mary in the Division I-AA playoffs. At the conclusion of the season, the Tigers were also recognized as black college national champion.

== Schedule ==
Date	Opponent	Rank	Site	Result	Attendance	Source
September 1	vs. Alabama State	No. 15	Legion Field; Birmingham, AL (Labor Day Classic)	W 40–0	47,359	
September 14	vs. Tennessee State*	No. 10	Liberty Bowl Memorial Stadium; Memphis, TN (Southern Heritage Classic)	W 21–14	55,212	
September 21	No. 22 Florida A&M*	No. 6	Mississippi Veterans Memorial Stadium; Jackson, MS	W 16–9	38,500	
September 28	Mississippi Valley State	No. 6	Mississippi Veterans Memorial Stadium; Jackson, MS	W 39–13	16,687	
October 5	Texas Southern	No. 6	Mississippi Veterans Memorial Stadium; Jackson, MS	W 31–14	38,005	
October 19	at Southern	No. 4	A. W. Mumford Stadium; Baton Rouge, LA (rivalry)	L 16–27	24,600	
October 26	at Grambling State	No. 11	Eddie G. Robinson Memorial Stadium; Grambling, LA	W 52–0	8,042	
November 2	at Arkansas–Pine Bluff	No. 10	War Memorial Stadium; Little Rock, AR	W 31–10	21,973	
November 9	Central State (OH)*	No. 8	Mississippi Veterans Memorial Stadium; Jackson, MS	W 41–14	7,000	
November 16	Prairie View A&M	No. 9	Mississippi Veterans Memorial Stadium; Jackson, MS	W 76–20	4,020	
November 23	Alcorn State	No. 8	Mississippi Veterans Memorial Stadium; Jackson, MS (Capital City Classic)	W 27–17	62,512	
November 30	at No. 7 William & Mary*	No. T–8	Zable Stadium; Williamsburg, VA (NCAA Division I-AA First Round)	L 6–45	4,057	
*Non-conference game; Rankings from The Sports Network Poll released prior to the game
