= 1996 Monmouth Hawks football team =

American college football season

1996 Monmouth Hawks football

NEC co-champion
- Conference: Northeast Conference
- Record: 7–3 (3–1 NEC)
- Head coach: Kevin Callahan (4th season)
- Offensive coordinator: Terry Dow (4th season)
- Offensive scheme: Multiple
- Defensive coordinator: Andy Bobik (3rd season)
- Base defense: 4–3
- Home stadium: Kessler Field

1996 Northeast Conference football standings
	Conf.			Overall
Team	W		L	W		L
Robert Morris +	3	–	1	9	–	2
Monmouth +	3	–	1	7	–	3
Central Connecticut State	2	–	2	3	–	7
Wagner	2	–	2	5	–	5
Saint Francis (PA)	0	–	4	3	–	7
+ – Conference co-champions

The 1996 Monmouth Hawks football team represented Monmouth University in the 1996 NCAA Division I-AA football season as a first-year member of the Northeast Conference (NEC). It was Monmouth's first year as a member of a conference after their transition from being an NCAA Division I-AA independent program. The Hawks were led by fourth-year head coach Kevin Callahan and played their home games at Kessler Field. They finished the season 5–4 overall and 3–1 in NEC play to share the conference championship with Robert Morris. They were not invited to participate in the Division I-AA postseason.

== Schedule ==
Date	Opponent	Site	Result	Attendance
September 7	Southern Connecticut*	Kessler Field; West Long Branch, NJ	L 0–27	
September 14	Saint Francis (PA)	Kessler Field; West Long Branch, NJ	W 46–17	
September 21	Pace*	Kessler Field; West Long Branch, NJ	W 48–0	
September 28	at C.W. Post*	Brookville, NY	W 14–7	
October 5	at Mercyhurst*	Saxon Stadium; Erie, PA	W 28–14	
October 12	at Wagner	Wagner College Stadium; Staten Island, NY	W 23–10	
October 19	Towson State*	Kessler Field; West Long Branch, NJ	L 6–15	
October 26	at Robert Morris	Moon Stadium; Moon Township, PA	L 6–43	2,681
November 9	Siena*	Kessler Field; West Long Branch, NJ	W 43–10	
November 16	Central Connecticut State	Kessler Field; West Long Branch, NJ	W 33–27	
*Non-conference game
