= 1996 NCAA Division I-AA football season =

American college football season

1996 NCAA Division I-AA season

Regular season
- Number of teams: 117
- Duration: August–November
- Payton Award: Archie Amerson (RB, Northern Arizona)
- Buchanan Award: Dexter Coakley (LB, Appalachian State)

Playoff
- Duration: November 30–December 21
- Championship date: December 21, 1996
- Championship site: Marshall University Stadium; Huntington, West Virginia
- Champion: Marshall

NCAA Division I-AA football seasons
- «1995 1997»

The 1996 NCAA Division I-AA football season, part of college football in the United States organized by the National Collegiate Athletic Association at the Division I-AA level, began in August 1996, and concluded with the 1996 NCAA Division I-AA Football Championship Game on December 21, 1996, at Marshall University Stadium in Huntington, West Virginia. The Marshall Thundering Herd won their second I-AA championship, defeating the defending national champion Montana Grizzlies by a score of 49–29.

== Conference changes and new programs ==
- The American West Conference disbanded following the 1995 season and its four remaining members either became independents (Cal Poly, Sacramento State, and Southern Utah) or joined the Big Sky (Cal State Northridge).
- Prior to the season, the Northeast Conference, a preexisting Division I conference, announced it would add football for its five members that sponsored the sport.

School	1995 Conference	1996 Conference
Boise State	Big Sky	Big West (I-A)
Cal State Northridge	American West	Big Sky
Cal Poly	American West	I-AA Independent
Central Connecticut State	I-AA Independent	Northeast
Central Florida	I-AA Independent	I-A Independent
Eastern Illinois	Gateway	Ohio Valley
Fairfield	New Program	MAAC
Hampton	I-AA Independent	MEAC
Idaho	Big Sky	Big West (I-A)
Monmouth	I-AA Independent	Northeast
Morehead State	Ohio Valley	I-AA Independent
Portland State	D-II Independent	Big Sky (I-AA)
Robert Morris	I-AA Independent	Northeast
Sacramento State	American West	Big Sky
St. Francis (PA)	I-AA Independent	Northeast
Southern Utah	American West	I-AA Independent
Troy State	I-AA Independent	Southland
UAB	I-AA Independent	I-A Independent
Wagner	I-AA Independent	Northeast

== Conference standings ==
1996 Big Sky Conference football standings
	Conf.			Overall
Team	W		L	W		L
No. 2 Montana $^	7	–	0	14	–	1
No. 6 Northern Arizona ^	6	–	1	9	–	3
Cal State Northridge	4	–	3	7	–	4
Weber State	4	–	3	7	–	4
Eastern Washington	3	–	4	6	–	5
Montana State	3	–	4	6	–	5
Idaho State	1	–	6	4	–	7
Sacramento State	0	–	7	1	–	10
Portland State	0	–	0	3	–	8
$ – Conference champion; ^ – NCAA Division I-AA playoff participant; Portland State games did not count in conference standings; Rankings from The Sports Network poll

1996 Gateway Football Conference standings
	Conf.			Overall
Team	W		L	W		L
No. 3 Northern Iowa $^	5	–	0	12	–	2
No. 10 Western Illinois ^	3	–	2	9	–	3
No. 21 Southwest Missouri State	3	–	2	7	–	4
Indiana State	3	–	2	6	–	5
Southern Illinois	1	–	4	5	–	6
Illinois State	0	–	5	3	–	8
$ – Conference champion; ^ – NCAA Division I-AA playoff participant; Rankings from The Sports Network poll

1996 Ivy League football standings
	Conf.			Overall
Team	W		L	W		L
No. 17 Dartmouth $	7	–	0	10	–	0
Columbia	5	–	2	8	–	2
Brown	4	–	3	5	–	5
Cornell	4	–	3	4	–	6
Penn	3	–	4	5	–	5
Harvard	2	–	5	4	–	6
Princeton	2	–	5	3	–	7
Yale	1	–	6	2	–	8
$ – Conference champion; Rankings from The Sports Network poll

1996 Metro Atlantic Athletic Conference football standings
	Conf.			Overall
Team	W		L	W		L
Duquesne $	8	–	0	10	–	1
Georgetown	7	–	1	7	–	3
Marist	6	–	2	7	–	3
St. John's	5	–	3	6	–	4
Canisius	4	–	4	5	–	4
Saint Peter's	2	–	6	2	–	7
Siena	2	–	6	2	–	7
Fairfield	1	–	7	1	–	8
Iona	1	–	7	1	–	9
$ – Conference champion

1996 Mid-Eastern Athletic Conference football standings
	Conf.			Overall
Team	W		L	W		L
No. 12 Florida A&M $^	7	–	0	9	–	3
No. 20 Howard	6	–	1	10	–	2
North Carolina A&T	4	–	3	8	–	3
South Carolina State	4	–	3	4	–	6
Hampton	3	–	4	5	–	6
Morgan State	2	–	5	4	–	7
Delaware State	2	–	5	3	–	8
Bethune–Cookman	0	–	7	2	–	9
$ – Conference champion; ^ – NCAA Division I-AA playoff participant; Rankings from The Sports Network poll

1996 Northeast Conference football standings
	Conf.			Overall
Team	W		L	W		L
Robert Morris +	3	–	1	9	–	2
Monmouth +	3	–	1	7	–	3
Central Connecticut State	2	–	2	3	–	7
Wagner	2	–	2	5	–	5
Saint Francis (PA)	0	–	4	3	–	7
+ – Conference co-champions

1996 Ohio Valley Conference football standings
	Conf.			Overall
Team	W		L	W		L
No. 4 Murray State $^	8	–	0	11	–	2
No. 16 Eastern Illinois ^	6	–	2	8	–	4
Eastern Kentucky	6	–	2	6	–	5
Middle Tennessee	4	–	4	6	–	5
Tennessee Tech	4	–	4	5	–	6
Tennessee State	3	–	5	4	–	7
Southeast Missouri State	3	–	5	3	–	8
Austin Peay	1	–	7	1	–	10
Tennessee–Martin	1	–	7	1	–	10
$ – Conference champion; ^ – NCAA Division I-AA playoff participant; Rankings from The Sports Network poll

1996 Patriot League football standings
	Conf.			Overall
Team	W		L	W		L
Bucknell $	4	–	1	6	–	5
Colgate	3	–	2	6	–	5
Lehigh	3	–	2	5	–	6
Lafayette	2	–	2	5	–	5
Fordham	1	–	3	2	–	8
Holy Cross	1	–	4	2	–	9
$ – Conference champion

1996 Pioneer Football League standings
	Conf.			Overall
Team	W		L	W		L
No. 24 Dayton $	5	–	0	11	–	0
Drake	4	–	1	8	–	3
Evansville	2	–	3	5	–	5
Butler	2	–	3	3	–	7
San Diego	1	–	4	4	–	6
Valparaiso	1	–	4	4	–	6
$ – Conference champion; Rankings from The Sports Network poll

1996 Southern Conference football standings
	Conf.			Overall
Team	W		L	W		L
No. 1 Marshall $^	8	–	0	15	–	0
No. T–8 East Tennessee State ^	7	–	1	10	–	3
No. 13 Furman ^	6	–	2	9	–	4
No. 25 Appalachian State	5	–	3	7	–	4
The Citadel	3	–	5	4	–	7
Georgia Southern	2	–	6	4	–	7
VMI	2	–	6	3	–	8
Chattanooga	2	–	6	3	–	8
Western Carolina	1	–	7	4	–	7
$ – Conference champion; Rankings from The Sports Network poll

1996 Southland Football League standings
	Conf.			Overall
Team	W		L	W		L
No. 5 Troy State $^	5	–	1	12	–	2
No. 19 Nicholls State ^	4	–	2	8	–	4
No. 22 Stephen F. Austin	3	–	3	7	–	4
Northwestern State	3	–	3	6	–	5
Sam Houston State	3	–	3	4	–	7
Southwest Texas State	2	–	4	5	–	6
McNeese State	1	–	5	3	–	8
$ – Conference champion; ^ – NCAA Division I-AA playoff participant; Rankings from The Sports Network poll

1996 Southwestern Athletic Conference football standings
	Conf.			Overall
Team	W		L	W		L
No. T–8 Jackson State $^	6	–	1	10	–	2
Southern	5	–	2	7	–	5
Mississippi Valley State	5	–	2	7	–	4
Texas Southern	5	–	2	7	–	4
Alcorn State	3	–	4	4	–	7
Grambling State	2	–	5	3	–	8
Alabama State	2	–	5	3	–	8
Prairie View A&M	0	–	7	0	–	11
$ – Conference champion; ^ – NCAA Division I-AA playoff participant; Rankings from The Sports Network Poll

1996 Yankee Conference football standings
	Conf.			Overall
Team	W		L	W		L
New England Division
No. 18 New Hampshire x	6	–	2	8	–	3
Maine	5	–	3	7	–	4
UMass	4	–	4	6	–	5
Connecticut	3	–	5	4	–	6
Rhode Island	2	–	6	4	–	6
Boston University	0	–	8	1	–	10
Mid-Atlantic Division
No. 7 William & Mary x$^	7	–	1	10	–	3
No. 14 Villanova ^	6	–	2	8	–	4
No. 11 Delaware ^	6	–	2	8	–	4
No. 23 James Madison	5	–	3	7	–	4
Northeastern	3	–	5	6	–	5
Richmond	1	–	7	2	–	9
$ – Conference champion; x – Division champion/co-champions; ^ – NCAA Division I-AA playoff participant; Rankings from The Sports Network poll

1996 NCAA Division I-AA independents football standings
	Conf.			Overall
Team	W		L	W		L
Buffalo		–		8	–	3
No. 15 Youngstown State		–		8	–	3
Saint Mary's		–		7	–	3
Western Kentucky		–		7	–	4
Davidson		–		6	–	4
Towson		–		6	–	4
Samford		–		6	–	5
Wofford		–		6	–	5
Cal Poly		–		5	–	6
Hofstra		–		5	–	6
Liberty		–		5	–	6
Southern Utah		–		4	–	7
Charleston Southern		–		2	–	8
Morehead State		–		2	–	8
Jacksonville State		–		1	–	9
^ – NCAA Division I-AA playoff participant; Rankings from The Sports Network poll

== Conference champions ==
Conference Champions

Big Sky Conference – Montana
Gateway Football Conference – Northern Iowa
Ivy League – Dartmouth
Metro Atlantic Athletic Conference – Duquesne
Mid-Eastern Athletic Conference – Florida A&M
Northeast Conference – Monmouth and Robert Morris
Ohio Valley Conference – Murray State
Patriot League – Bucknell
Pioneer Football League – Dayton
Southern Conference – Marshall
Southland Football League – Troy State
Southwestern Athletic Conference – Jackson State
Yankee Conference – William & Mary

== Postseason ==
The location of the title game, Marshall University Stadium, was determined before the playoffs started.

=== NCAA Division I-AA playoff bracket ===
First Round; November 30; Campus sites
16	Nicholls State	3
1	Montana*	48
11	Villanova	29
6	East Tennessee State*	35
13	Florida A&M	25
4	Troy State*	29
12	Western Illinois	6
5	Murray State*	34
15	Delaware	14
2	Marshall*	59
10	Furman	42
7	Northern Arizona*	31
14	Eastern Illinois	14
3	Northern Iowa*	21
9	Jackson State	6
8	William & Mary*	45

Quarterfinals; December 7 Campus sites
1	Montana*	44
6	East Tennessee State	14
4	Troy State*	31
5	Murray State	3
2	Marshall*	54
10	Furman	0
3	Northern Iowa*	38
8	William & Mary	35

Semifinals; December 14; Campus sites
1	Montana*	70
4	Troy State	7
2	Marshall*	31
3	Northern Iowa	14

National Championship Game; December 21; Marshall University Stadium; Huntington, West Virginia
1	Montana	29
2	Marshall	49

* Denotes host institution
