= 1996 NCAA Division I-AA football rankings =

The 1996 NCAA Division I-AA football rankings are from the Sports Network poll of Division I-AA head coaches, athletic directors, sports information directors and media members. This is for the 1996 season.

== Legend ==
	Increase in ranking
	Decrease in ranking
	Not ranked previous week
(#–#)	Win–loss record
(Italics)	Number of first place votes
т	Tied with team above or below also with this symbol

== The Sports Network poll ==
	Preseason	Week 1 Sept 3	Week 2 Sept 10	Week 3 Sept 17	Week 4 Sept 24	Week 5 Oct 1	Week 6 Oct 8	Week 7 Oct 15	Week 8 Oct 22	Week 9 Oct 29	Week 10 Nov 5	Week 11 Nov 12	Week 12 Nov 19	Week 13 Nov 26	
1.	Marshall (44)	Marshall (0–0) (49)	Marshall (1–0) (53)	Marshall (2–0) (59)	Marshall (3–0) (75)	Marshall (4–0) (62)	Marshall (5–0) (64)	Marshall (6–0) (62)	Marshall (7–0) (72)	Marshall (8–0) (68)	Marshall (9–0) (69)	Marshall (10–0) (67)	Marshall (11–0) (71)	Marshall (11–0) (50)	1.
2.	Montana (1)	Montana (0–0) (5)	Montana (1–0) (25)	Montana (2–0) (33)	Montana (2–0) (23)	Montana (3–0) (23)	Montana (4–0) (25)	Montana (5–0) (24)	Montana (6–0) (20)	Montana (7–0) (22)	Montana (8–0) (23)	Montana (9–0) (24)	Montana (10–0) (23)	Montana (11–0) (15)	2.
3.	McNeese State (1)	McNeese State (0–0) (1)	Stephen F. Austin (2–0) (4)	Northern Iowa (3–0)	Troy State (3–0) (2)	Northern Iowa (4–1)	Northern Iowa (4–1)	Northern Iowa (5–1)	Northern Iowa (6–1)	Northern Iowa (7–1)	Northern Iowa (8–1)	Northern Iowa (9–1)	Northern Iowa (10–1)	Northern Iowa (10–1)	3.
4.	Appalachian State	Stephen F. Austin (1–0) (2)	Delaware (1–0) (1)	Troy State (2–0) (2)	Appalachian State (2–1)	Appalachian State (3–1)	Stephen F. Austin (3–1)	Jackson State (5–0) (2)	Troy State (6–1)	Troy State (7–1)	Murray State (7–1)	Murray State (8–1)	Murray State (9–1)	Murray State (10–1)	4.
5.	Stephen F. Austin (3)	Delaware (0–0) (2)	Northern Iowa (2–0)	Appalachian State (1–1)	Northern Iowa (3–1)	Stephen F. Austin (3–1)	Jackson State (5–0) (2)	SW Missouri State (5–1)	Murray State (6–1)	Murray State (6–1)	Troy State (7–1)	Troy State (8–1)	Troy State (9–1)	Troy State (10–1)	5.
6.	Delaware	Northern Iowa (1–0)	Troy State (2–0)	Jackson State (2–0) (1)	Jackson State (3–0) (2)	Jackson State (4–0) (1)	SW Missouri State (5–1)	Troy State (5–1)	Northern Arizona (7–1)	Delaware (7–1)	Northern Arizona (8–2)	Northern Arizona (9–2)	Northern Arizona (9–2)	Northern Arizona (9–2)	6.
7.	Northern Iowa	Appalachian State (0–1)	Appalachian State (1–1)	Stephen F. Austin (2–1)	Stephen F. Austin (2–1)	SW Missouri State (4–1)	Eastern Illinois (4–0)	Northern Arizona (6–1)	Delaware (6–1)	SW Missouri State (6–2)	East Tennessee State (8–1)	Stephen F. Austin (7–2)	William & Mary (9–2)	William & Mary (9–2)	7.
8.	Murray State	Troy State (1–0)	Hofstra (1–0)	Connecticut (2–0)	SW Missouri State (3–1)	Eastern Illinois (4–0)	Troy State (4–1)	Murray State (5–1)	Furman (6–1)	Northern Arizona (7–2)	Jackson State (7–1)	Western Illinois (9–1)	Jackson State (9–1)	Jackson State (10–1) т	8.
9.	Eastern Kentucky	Murray State (0–0)	McNeese State (0–1)	Eastern Illinois (3–0)	Eastern Illinois (3–0)	Troy State (3–1)	Murray State (4–1)	Villanova (5–1) (1)	SW Missouri State (5–2)	East Tennessee State (7–1)	Stephen F. Austin (6–2)	Jackson State (8–1)	East Tennessee State (9–2)	East Tennessee State (9–2) т	9.
10.	Troy State	Eastern Kentucky (0–0)	Jackson State (1–0)	SW Missouri State (2–1)	Murray State (2–1)	Murray State (3–1)	Northern Arizona (5–1)	Delaware (5–1)	James Madison (6–1)	Jackson State (6–1)	Western Illinois (8–1)	William & Mary (8–2)	Delaware (8–3)	Western Illinois (9–2)	10.
11.	Hofstra	Hofstra (0–0)	Eastern Kentucky (0–1)	Delaware (1–1)	Delaware (2–1)	Delaware (3–1)	Delaware (4–1)	Furman (5–1)	Jackson State (5–1)	Stephen F. Austin (5–2)	Florida A&M (7–1)	East Tennessee State (8–2)	Western Illinois (9–2)	Delaware (8–3)	11.
12.	Southern	Southern (0–0)	Connecticut (1–0)	Murray State (1–1)	Western Kentucky (4–0)	Northern Arizona (4–1)	Villanova (4–1) (2)	Stephen F. Austin (3–2)	Stephen F. Austin (4–2)	Florida A&M (6–1)	Delaware (7–2)	Furman (7–2)	New Hampshire (8–2)	Florida A&M (9–2)	12.
13.	Middle Tennessee State	Jackson State (1–0)	Murray State (0–1)	Georgia Southern (1–1)	Northern Arizona (3–1)	Villanova (3–1) (2)	Furman (4–1)	James Madison (5–1)	Florida A&M (6–1)	Western Illinois (7–1)	William & Mary (7–2)	Delaware (7–3)	Florida A&M (8–2)	Furman (8–3)	13.
14.	Liberty	Georgia Southern (1–0)	SW Missouri State (1–1)	Hofstra (1–1)	Weber State (3–0)	Furman (3–1)	Appalachian State (3–2)	Eastern Illinois (4–1)	East Tennessee State (6–1)	Furman (6–2)	SW Missouri State (6–3)	Eastern Illinois (7–2)	Stephen F. Austin (7–3)	Villanova (8–3)	14.
15.	Jackson State	Connecticut (0–0)	Georgia Southern (1–1)	Western Kentucky (3–0)	Villanova (3–1) (2)	Connecticut (3–1)	William & Mary (4–1)	Florida A&M (5–1)	Western Illinois (6–1)	William & Mary (6–2)	Furman (6–2)	New Hampshire (7–2)	Furman (7–3)	Youngstown State (8–3)	15.
16.	Connecticut	Northern Arizona (1–0)	Northern Arizona (1–1)	Northern Arizona (2–1)	Connecticut (2–1)	Western Kentucky (4–1)	Florida A&M (4–1)	East Tennessee State (6–1)	William & Mary (5–2)	Villanova (6–2)	Villanova (7–2)	Florida A&M (7–2)	Youngstown State (8–3)	Eastern Illinois (8–3)	16.
17.	Idaho State	Liberty (0–1)	Eastern Illinois (2–0)	Weber State (2–0)	Idaho State (2–1)	William & Mary (3–1)	James Madison (4–1)	Western Illinois (5–1)	Villanova (5–2)	Eastern Illinois (5–2)	Eastern Illinois (6–2)	Youngstown State (7–3)	Villanova (8–3)	Dartmouth (10–0)	17.
18.	Georgia Southern	Middle Tennessee State (0–1)	Southern (0–1)	Villanova (2–1)	Furman (2–1)	Weber State (3–1)	Connecticut (3–2)	New Hampshire (4–1)	Eastern Illinois (4–2)	James Madison (6–2)	New Hampshire (6–2)	James Madison (7–3)	Dartmouth (9–0)	New Hampshire (8–3)	18.
19.	Furman	Furman (0–0)	Idaho State (1–1)	Idaho State (1–1)	William & Mary (3–1)	Northwestern State (4–0)	Northwestern State (4–1)	William & Mary (4–2)	Northwestern State (5–2)	Eastern Washington (6–2)	Northwestern State (5–3)	Dartmouth (8–0)	Eastern Illinois (7–3)	Nicholls State (8–3)	19.
20.	Northern Arizona	Idaho State (0–1)	Weber State (1–0)	Furman (1–1)	James Madison (3–0)	New Hampshire (3–0)	Western Kentucky (4–2)	Eastern Washington (5–1)	Appalachian State (4–3)	New Hampshire (5–2)	Eastern Washington (6–3)	SW Missouri State (6–4)	SW Missouri State (7–4)	Howard (9–2)	20.
21.	SW Missouri State	SW Missouri State (0–1)	Furman (0–1)	Florida A&M (2–0)	Florida A&M (2–1)	Florida A&M (3–1)	Weber State (3–2)	Appalachian State (3–3)	Indiana State (6–2)	Youngstown State (6–2)	Indiana State (6–3)	Villanova (7–3)	Howard (8–2)	SW Missouri State (7–4)	21.
22.	Weber State	Rhode Island (1–0)	Florida A&M (2–0)	William & Mary (2–1)	Northwestern State (3–0)	Western Illinois (4–0)	East Tennessee State (5–1)	Northwestern State (4–2)	Eastern Washington (5–2)	Northwestern State (5–3)	James Madison (6–3)	Nicholls State (6–3)	Nicholls State (7–3)	Stephen F. Austin (7–4)	22.
23.	Rhode Island	Weber State (0–0)	William & Mary (1–1)	James Madison (2–0)	Georgia Southern (1–2)	James Madison (3–1)	Idaho State (3–2)	Indiana State (5–2)	Connecticut (4–3)	Indiana State (6–3)	Youngstown State (6–3)	Howard (7–2)	James Madison (7–4)	James Madison (7–4)	23.
24.	Indiana State	Eastern Illinois (1–0)	Western Kentucky (2–0)	McNeese State (0–2)	Western Illinois (4–0)	Idaho State (2–2)	New Hampshire (3–1)	Connecticut (3–3)	New Hampshire (4–2)	Columbia (6–0)	Eastern Kentucky (5–3)	Eastern Washington (6–4)	Dayton (11–0)	Dayton (11–0)	24.
25.	Eastern Illinois	Indiana State (1–0)	Youngstown State (2–0)	Eastern Kentucky (0–2)	New Hampshire (2–0)	Georgia Southern (1–3)	Western Illinois (4–1)	Idaho State (3–3)	Idaho State (3–3)	Southern (5–2)	Dartmouth (7–0)	Northwestern State (5–4)	Appalachian State (6–4) т	Appalachian State (7–4)	25.
26.													Buffalo (8–3) т		26.
	Preseason	Week 1 Sept 3	Week 2 Sept 10	Week 3 Sept 17	Week 4 Sept 24	Week 5 Oct 1	Week 6 Oct 8	Week 7 Oct 15	Week 8 Oct 22	Week 9 Oct 29	Week 10 Nov 5	Week 11 Nov 12	Week 12 Nov 19	Week 13 Nov 26	
		None	Dropped: 17 Liberty; 18 Middle Tennessee State; 22 Rhode Island; 25 Indiana State	Dropped: 18 Southern; 25 Youngstown State	Dropped: 14 Hofstra; 24 McNeese State; 25 Eastern Kentucky	None	Dropped: 25 Georgia Southern	Dropped: 20 Western Kentucky; 21 Weber State	None	Dropped: 20 Appalachian State; 23 Connecticut; 25 Idaho State	Dropped: 24 Columbia; 25 Southern	Dropped: 21 Indiana State; 24 Eastern Kentucky	Dropped: 24 Eastern Washington; 25 Northwestern State	Dropped: 25 Buffalo	
