= 1996 Davidson Wildcats football team =

American college football season

1996 Davidson Wildcats football
- Conference: Independent
- Record: 6–4
- Head coach: Tim Landis (4th season)
- Home stadium: Richardson Stadium

1996 NCAA Division I-AA independents football standings
	Conf.			Overall
Team	W		L	W		L
Buffalo		–		8	–	3
No. 15 Youngstown State		–		8	–	3
Saint Mary's		–		7	–	3
Western Kentucky		–		7	–	4
Davidson		–		6	–	4
Towson		–		6	–	4
Samford		–		6	–	5
Wofford		–		6	–	5
Cal Poly		–		5	–	6
Hofstra		–		5	–	6
Liberty		–		5	–	6
Southern Utah		–		4	–	7
Charleston Southern		–		2	–	8
Morehead State		–		2	–	8
Jacksonville State		–		1	–	9
^ – NCAA Division I-AA playoff participant; Rankings from The Sports Network poll

The 1996 Davidson Wildcats football team was an American football team that represented Davidson College as an independent during the 1996 NCAA Division I-AA football season. Led by fourth-year head coach Tim Landis, the team compiled a 6–4 record.

== Schedule ==
Date	Opponent	Site	Result	Attendance	Source
September 14	at Maryville	Honaker Field; Maryville, TN	W 24–14		
September 21	at Sewanee	McGee Field; Sewanee, TN	L 16–17		
September 28	Emory and Henry^{†}	Richardson Stadium; Davidson, NC	L 17–24	3,126	
October 5	Guilford	Richardson Stadium; Davidson, NC	W 13–10	2,319	
October 12	Washington and Lee	Richardson Stadium; Davidson, NC	W 23–12		
October 19	at Methodist	Monarch Stadium; Fayetteville, NC	L 13–42		
October 26	Randolph–Macon	Richardson Stadium; Davidson, NC	L 24–31	2,358	
November 2	at Hampden–Sydney	Hundley Stadium; Hampden Sydney, VA	W 24–21		
November 9	Centre	Richardson Stadium; Davidson, NC	W 42–21		
November 16	at Bridgewater	Jopson Athletic Complex; Bridgewater, VA	W 27–24		
^{†}Homecoming
