= 1996 Cal State Northridge Matadors football team =

American college football season

1996 Cal State Northridge Matadors football
- Conference: Big Sky Conference
- Record: 7–4 (4–3 Big Sky)
- Head coach: Dave Baldwin (2nd season)
- Defensive coordinator: Ron Ponciano (2nd season)
- Home stadium: North Campus Stadium

1996 Big Sky Conference football standings
	Conf.			Overall
Team	W		L	W		L
No. 2 Montana $^	7	–	0	14	–	1
No. 6 Northern Arizona ^	6	–	1	9	–	3
Cal State Northridge	4	–	3	7	–	4
Weber State	4	–	3	7	–	4
Eastern Washington	3	–	4	6	–	5
Montana State	3	–	4	6	–	5
Idaho State	1	–	6	4	–	7
Sacramento State	0	–	7	1	–	10
Portland State	0	–	0	3	–	8
$ – Conference champion; ^ – NCAA Division I-AA playoff participant; Portland State games did not count in conference standings; Rankings from The Sports Network poll

The 1996 Cal State Northridge Matadors football team represented California State University, Northridge as a member of the Big Sky Conference during the 1996 NCAA Division I-AA football season. Cal State Northridge and Sacramento State competed for the first time in the Big Sky Conference in 1996. Both teams has been members of the American West Conference (AWC), which folded after the 1995 season. Led by Dave Baldwin in his second and final season as head coach, Cal State Northridge compiled an overall record of 7–4 with a mark of 4–3 in conference play, tying for third place in the Big Sky. Two of the Matador's conference wins came against ranked opponents, Weber State and Eastern Washington. The team outscored its opponents 407 to 313 for the season. The Matadors played home games at North Campus Stadium in Northridge, California.

== Schedule ==
Date	Opponent	Site	Result	Attendance	Source
September 7	at Utah State*	Romney Stadium; Logan, UT	L 27–57	20,210	
September 14	No. 16 (D-II) UC Davis*	North Campus Stadium; Northridge, CA	W 56–31	4,264	
September 21	at New Mexico State*	Aggie Memorial Stadium; Las Cruces, NM	W 33–0	12,259	
September 28	at No. 13 Northern Arizona	Walkup Skydome; Flagstaff, AZ	L 14–32	9,028	
October 5	Portland State	North Campus Stadium; Northridge, CA	W 46–14	3,083	
October 12	at No. 21 Weber State	Wildcat Stadium; Ogden, UT	W 35–28	10,503	
October 19	Montana State	North Campus Stadium; Northridge, CA	L 17–24	5,631	
October 26	at Sacramento State	Hornet Stadium; Sacramento, CA	W 52–17	4,007	
November 2	No. 2 Montana	North Campus Stadium; Northridge, CA	L 36–43	4,217	
November 9	at Idaho State	Holt Arena; Pocatello, ID	W 42–40	6,006	
November 16	No. 24 Eastern Washington	North Campus Stadium; Northridge, CA	W 49–27		
*Non-conference game; Rankings from The Sports Network Poll released prior to the game
