= 1996 Humboldt State Lumberjacks football team =

American college football season

1996 Humboldt State Lumberjacks football
- Conference: Northern California Athletic Conference
- Record: 3–7 (1–3 NCAC)
- Head coach: Fred Whitmire (6th season)
- Home stadium: Redwood Bowl

1996 Northern California Athletic Conference football standings
| | Conf. | | | Overall |
| Team | W | | L | W | | L |
|---|---|---|---|---|---|---|
| Chico State $ | 3 | – | 1 | 5 | – | 5 |
| Sonoma State | 2 | – | 2 | 2 | – | 8 |
| Humboldt State | 1 | – | 3 | 3 | – | 7 |
$ – Conference champion

The 1996 Humboldt State Lumberjacks football team represented Humboldt State University—now known as California State Polytechnic University, Humboldt—as a member of the Northern California Athletic Conference (NCAC) during the 1996 NCAA Division II football season. Led by sixth-year head coach Fred Whitmire, the Lumberjacks compiled an overall record of 3–7 with a mark of 1–3 in conference play, placing last out of three teams in the NCAC. The team was outscored its by opponents 258 to 159 for the season. Humboldt State played home games at the Redwood Bowl in Arcata, California.

== Schedule ==
| Date | Opponent | Site | Result | Attendance | Source |
|---|---|---|---|---|---|
| September 7 | at Montana Tech* | Butte, MT | L 7–20 | | |
| September 14 | Western Montana* | Redwood Bowl; Arcata, CA | W 36–6 | 2,956 | |
| September 21 | at Azusa Pacific* | Cougar Athletic Stadium; Azusa, CA | W 37–35 | 3,133 | |
| October 5 | No. 20 UC Davis* | Redwood Bowl; Arcata, CA | L 13–50 | 4,232–4,323 | |
| October 12 | Sonoma State | Redwood Bowl; Arcata, CA | L 10–24 | 2,642 | |
| October 19 | at Chico State | University Stadium; Chico, CA | L 14–39 | 5,226 | |
| October 26 | at Sonoma State | Cossacks Stadium; Rohnert Park, CA | W 21–6 | 1,196 | |
| November 2 | Colorado Mines* | Redwood Bowl; Arcata, CA | L 6–16 | 1,458 | |
| November 9 | Chico State | Redwood Bowl; Arcata, CA | L 9–13 | 1,900 | |
| November 16 | at Saint Mary's* | Saint Mary's Stadium; Moraga, CA | L 6–49 | 1,683 | |
*Non-conference game; Rankings from NCAA Division II Football Committee Poll released prior to the game
