= 1996 Sonoma State Cossacks football team =

American college football season

1996 Sonoma State Cossacks football
- Conference: Northern California Athletic Conference
- Record: 2–8 (2–2 NCAC)
- Head coach: Frank Scalercio (4th season)
- Home stadium: Cossacks Stadium

1996 Northern California Athletic Conference football standings
	Conf.			Overall
Team	W		L	W		L
Chico State $	3	–	1	5	–	5
Sonoma State	2	–	2	2	–	8
Humboldt State	1	–	3	3	–	7
$ – Conference champion

The 1996 Sonoma State Cossacks football team represented Sonoma State University as a member of the Northern California Athletic Conference (NCAC) during the 1996 NCAA Division II football season. Led by fourth-year head coach Frank Scalercio, Sonoma State compiled an overall record of 2–8 with a mark of 2–2 in conference play, placing second in the NCAC. The team was outscored by its opponents 280 to 134 for the season. The average score in the eight losses was 44–7. The Cossacks played home games at Cossacks Stadium (Note: Cossacks Stadium was renamed in 2002 to Seawolf Stadium when the University changed the name of the mascot to Seawolves.) in Rohnert Park, California.

1996 was the last year Sonoma State played intercollegiate football. On December 9, the school announced it was dropping the football program citing budget constraints. Scalercio finished his tenure at Sonoma State with an overall record of 7–30–1, for a winning percentage of .197.

== Schedule ==
Date	Opponent	Site	Result	Attendance	Source
September 7	Western Montana*	Cossacks Stadium; Rohnert Park, CA	L 17–34	1,362	
September 14	at Portland State*	Civic Stadium; Portland, OR	L 7–25	7,043	
September 21	Saint Mary's*	Cossacks Stadium; Rohnert Park, CA	L 14–28	1,172	
September 28	La Verne*	Cossacks Stadium; Rohnert Park, CA	L 23–33	734	
October 12	at Humboldt State	Redwood Bowl; Arcata, CA	W 24–10	2,642	
October 19	at Chapman*	Chapman stadium; Orange, CA	L 7–48	3,358	
October 26	Humboldt State	Cossacks Stadium; Rohnert Park, CA	L 6–21	1,196	
November 2	Chico State	Cossacks Stadium; Rohnert Park, CA	W 9–7	567	
November 9	No. 17 UC Davis*	Cossacks Stadium; Rohnert Park, CA	L 7–49	1,205	
November 16	at Chico State	University Stadium; Chico, CA	L 20–25	787	
*Non-conference game; Rankings from NCAA Division II Football Committee Poll released prior to the game
