= 1996 Western Kentucky Hilltoppers football team =

American college football season

1996 Western Kentucky Hilltoppers football
- Conference: Independent
- Record: 7–4
- Head coach: Jack Harbaugh (8th season)
- Home stadium: L. T. Smith Stadium

1996 NCAA Division I-AA independents football standings
	Conf.			Overall
Team	W		L	W		L
Buffalo		–		8	–	3
No. 15 Youngstown State		–		8	–	3
Saint Mary's		–		7	–	3
Western Kentucky		–		7	–	4
Davidson		–		6	–	4
Towson		–		6	–	4
Samford		–		6	–	5
Wofford		–		6	–	5
Cal Poly		–		5	–	6
Hofstra		–		5	–	6
Liberty		–		5	–	6
Southern Utah		–		4	–	7
Charleston Southern		–		2	–	8
Morehead State		–		2	–	8
Jacksonville State		–		1	–	9
^ – NCAA Division I-AA playoff participant; Rankings from The Sports Network poll

The 1996 Western Kentucky Hilltoppers football team represented Western Kentucky University in the 1996 NCAA Division I-AA football season and were led by quarterback Willie Taggart and head coach Jack Harbaugh. The team was an independent and primarily ran an option offense. Their schedule included top-ranked and eventual undefeated NCAA Division I-AA champion, Marshall. Western Kentucky's roster featured future National Football League (NFL) player Ben Wittman. Joey Stockton and Mike Mills were named to All-American teams. The I-AA Independent All-Star Team included Antwan Floyd, Trae Hackett, Stockton, Turner Goodwin, and Mills.

== Schedule ==
Date	Opponent	Rank	Site	Result	Attendance	Source
August 29	Kentucky Wesleyan		L. T. Smith Stadium; Bowling Green, KY	W 66–0	9,600	
September 7	at No. 9 Murray State		Roy Stewart Stadium; Murray, KY (Battle for the Red Belt)	W 44–41 ^{OT}	14,123	
September 14	No. 11 Eastern Kentucky	No. 24	L. T. Smith Stadium; Bowling Green, KY (Battle of the Bluegrass)	W 14–7	17,600	
September 21	at Austin Peay	No. 15	Fortera Stadium; Clarksville, TN	W 34–2	5,011	
September 28	at No. 1 Marshall	No. 12	Marshall University Stadium; Huntington, WV	L 3–37	20,755	
October 5	at UAB	No. 16	Legion Field; Birmingham, AL	L 0–24	14,107	
October 12	at Jacksonville State	No. 20	JSU Stadium; Jacksonville, AL	L 20–34	4,334	
October 19	Liberty		L. T. Smith Stadium; Bowling Green, KY	L 14–23	7,100	
October 26	No. 21 Indiana State^{†}		L. T. Smith Stadium; Bowling Green, KY	W 27–20	8,200	
November 2	Southern Illinois		L. T. Smith Stadium; Bowling Green, KY	W 51–37	5,800	
November 9	at Morehead State		Jayne Stadium; Morehead, KY	W 31–26	1,500	
^{†}Homecoming; Rankings from The Sports Network Poll released prior to the game
