= 1996 Western Illinois Leathernecks football team =

American college football season

1996 Western Illinois Leathernecks football

NCAA Division I-AA First Round, L 6–34 at Murray State
- Conference: Gateway Football Conference

Ranking
- Sports Network: No. 10
- Record: 9–3 (3–2 Gateway)
- Head coach: Randy Ball (7th season)
- Home stadium: Hanson Field

1996 Gateway Football Conference standings
| | Conf. | | | Overall |
| Team | W | | L | W | | L |
|---|---|---|---|---|---|---|
| No. 3 Northern Iowa $^ | 5 | – | 0 | 12 | – | 2 |
| No. 10 Western Illinois ^ | 3 | – | 2 | 9 | – | 3 |
| No. 21 Southwest Missouri State | 3 | – | 2 | 7 | – | 4 |
| Indiana State | 3 | – | 2 | 6 | – | 5 |
| Southern Illinois | 1 | – | 4 | 5 | – | 6 |
| Illinois State | 0 | – | 5 | 3 | – | 8 |
$ – Conference champion; ^ – NCAA Division I-AA playoff participant; Rankings from The Sports Network poll

The 1996 Western Illinois Leathernecks football team represented Western Illinois University as a member of the Gateway Football Conference during the 1996 NCAA Division I-AA football season. They were led by seventh-year head coach Randy Ball and played their home games at Hanson Field. The Leathernecks finished the season with a 9–3 record overall and a 3–2 record in conference play. The team received an at-large bid to the NCAA Division I-AA Football Championship playoffs, where they lost to Murray State in the first round.

== Schedule ==
| Date | Opponent | Rank | Site | Result | Attendance | Source |
|---|---|---|---|---|---|---|
| August 29 | Northwestern Oklahoma State* | | Hanson Field; Macomb, IL | W 44–21 | | |
| September 7 | at Northern Illinois* | | Huskie Stadium; DeKalb, IL | W 17–0 | 21,370 | |
| September 14 | Alcorn State* | | Hanson Field; Macomb, IL | W 34–17 | 6,498 | |
| September 21 | at No. 14 Hofstra* | | Hofstra Stadium; Hempstead, NY | W 18–9 | 3,719 | |
| October 5 | Indiana State | No. 22 | Hanson Field; Macomb, IL | L 7–10 | | |
| October 12 | at No. 7 Eastern Illinois* | No. 25 | O'Brien Field; Charleston, IL | W 10–7 | 10,133 | |
| October 19 | at Southern Illinois | No. 17 | McAndrew Stadium; Carbondale, IL | W 26–19 | 11,300 | |
| October 26 | Cal Poly* | No. 15 | Hanson Field; Macomb, IL | W 51–10 | | |
| November 2 | at No. 7 Southwest Missouri State | No. 13 | Robert W. Plaster Stadium; Springfield, MO | W 23–17 | 15,878 | |
| November 9 | Illinois State | No. 10 | Hanson Field; Macomb, IL | W 28–11 | 5,714 | |
| November 16 | at No. 3 Northern Iowa | No. 8 | UNI-Dome; Cedar Falls, IA | L 6–30 | 15,476 | |
| November 30 | at No. 4 Murray State* | No. 10 | Roy Stewart Stadium; Murray, KY (NCAA Division I-AA First Round) | L 6–34 | 2,753 | |
*Non-conference game; Rankings from The Sports Network Poll released prior to the game
