= 1996 Cal Poly Mustangs football team =

American college football season

1996 Cal Poly Mustangs football
- Conference: Independent
- Record: 5–6
- Head coach: Andre Patterson (3rd season)
- Home stadium: Mustang Stadium

1996 NCAA Division I-AA independents football standings
	Conf.			Overall
Team	W		L	W		L
Buffalo		–		8	–	3
No. 15 Youngstown State		–		8	–	3
Saint Mary's		–		7	–	3
Western Kentucky		–		7	–	4
Davidson		–		6	–	4
Towson		–		6	–	4
Samford		–		6	–	5
Wofford		–		6	–	5
Cal Poly		–		5	–	6
Hofstra		–		5	–	6
Liberty		–		5	–	6
Southern Utah		–		4	–	7
Charleston Southern		–		2	–	8
Morehead State		–		2	–	8
Jacksonville State		–		1	–	9
^ – NCAA Division I-AA playoff participant; Rankings from The Sports Network poll

The 1996 Cal Poly Mustangs football team represented California Polytechnic State University, San Luis Obispo as an independent during the 1996 NCAA Division I-AA football season. Led by Andre Patterson in his third and final season as head coach, Cal Poly compiled a record of 5–6. The team was outscored by its opponents 356 to 308 for the season. The Mustangs played home games at Mustang Stadium in San Luis Obispo, California.

Patterson finished his three-year tenure as head coach with a record of 17–16, for a .515 winning percentage.

== Schedule ==
Date	Opponent	Site	Result	Attendance	Source
September 7	at No. 20 Idaho State	Holt Arena; Pocatello, ID	L 32–35 ^{OT}		
September 14	at No. 2 Montana	Washington–Grizzly Stadium; Missoula, MT	L 0–43	18,169	
September 21	No. 17 Weber State	Mustang Stadium; San Luis Obispo, CA	L 20–30		
September 28	Central Washington	Mustang Stadium; San Luis Obispo, CA	W 49–14		
October 5	at Idaho	Kibbie Dome; Moscow, ID	L 33–38	14,579	
October 12	Saint Mary's	Mustang Stadium; San Luis Obispo, CA	W 34–33		
October 19	Southern Utah	Mustang Stadium; San Luis Obispo, CA	W 45–34		
October 26	at No. 15 Western Illinois	Hanson Field; Macomb, IL	L 10–51		
November 2	No. 12 (D-II) UC Davis	Mustang Stadium; San Luis Obispo, CA (rivalry)	W 17–13	8,216	
November 9	at Montana State	Reno H. Sales Stadium; Bozeman, MT	L 20–37	3,607	
November 23	at Sacramento State	Hornet Stadium; Sacramento, CA	W 48–28	3,398	
Rankings from The Sports Network Poll released prior to the game
