= Circle City Classic =

Annual college football classic held between historically black colleges

- Stadium: Lucas Oil Stadium
- Location: Indianapolis, Indiana
- Previous stadiums: RCA Dome
- Operated: 1984–present

The Circle City Classic is an annual American football game featuring two historically black colleges/universities (HBCUs) and played in Indianapolis, Indiana. The event was established in 1984 by Indiana Black Expo and has been played every year except 2020, when it was canceled due to the COVID-19 pandemic. No game was played for the 2022 Circle City Classic. The game was held from 1984 to 2007 in the RCA Dome and was moved to the new Lucas Oil Stadium in 2008. In addition to the weekend game, there is also a parade, The Classic Coronation, and concert related to the Classic.

== Game results ==
Year	Winning team		Losing team		Source
1984	Mississippi Valley State	48	Grambling State	36	
1985	Mississippi Valley State	28	Tennessee State	13	
1986	Central State (OH)	41	Florida A&M	3	
1987	Central State (OH)	31	Tennessee State	28	
1988*	Florida A&M	10*	Jackson State	10*	
1989	Jackson State	27	Bethune–Cookman	7	
1990	Grambling State	27	Alabama A&M	20	
1991	Alcorn State	46	Howard	27	
1992	Central State (OH)	34	Alabama State	13	
1993	South Carolina State	34	Jackson State	33	
1994	North Carolina A&T	22	Southern	21	
1995	Alcorn State	46	Howard	27	
1996	Florida A&M	59	Hampton	58	
1997	North Carolina A&T	49	Tennessee State	37	
1998	Howard	32	Bethune–Cookman	25	
1999	Southern	21	Hampton	6	
2000	Grambling State	12	Florida A&M	10	
2001	Tennessee State	45	Howard	0	
2002	Alabama A&M	27	Southern	11	
2003	Florida A&M	28	Jackson State	14	
2004	South Carolina State	30	Tennessee State	13	
2005	North Carolina A&T	16	Tennessee State	3	
2006	Central State (OH)	42	Hampton	3	
2007	Winston-Salem State	27	Florida A&M	23	
2008	Tuskegee	34	Alabama A&M	24	
2009	Alabama A&M	35	Tuskegee	15	
2010	Tennessee State	37	North Carolina A&T	7	
2011	Albany State	57	Kentucky State	31	
2012	North Carolina Central	40	South Carolina State	10	
2013	Alcorn State	48	Grambling State	0	
2014	Kentucky State	31	Central State (OH)	24	
2015	Kentucky State	21	Central State (OH)	17	
2016	Kentucky State	17	Central State (OH)	14	
2017	Kentucky State	34	Central State (OH)	22	
2018	Howard	41	Bethune–Cookman	35	
2019	Kentucky State	33	Jackson State	25	
2020	Game canceled due to Pandemic				
2021	Kentucky State	34	Benedict	28	
2022	No game				
2023	North Carolina Central	45	Mississippi Valley State	3	
2024	North Carolina Central	37	Norfolk State	10	

* Denotes a tie

== See also ==
- List of black college football classics
- List of attractions and events in Indianapolis
