= 1996 Weber State Wildcats football team =

American college football season

1996 Weber State Wildcats football
- Conference: Big Sky Conference
- Record: 7–4 (4–3 Big Sky)
- Head coach: Dave Arslanian (8th season)
- Home stadium: Wildcat Stadium

1996 Big Sky Conference football standings
| | Conf. | | | Overall |
| Team | W | | L | W | | L |
|---|---|---|---|---|---|---|
| No. 2 Montana $^ | 7 | – | 0 | 14 | – | 1 |
| No. 6 Northern Arizona ^ | 6 | – | 1 | 9 | – | 3 |
| Cal State Northridge | 4 | – | 3 | 7 | – | 4 |
| Weber State | 4 | – | 3 | 7 | – | 4 |
| Eastern Washington | 3 | – | 4 | 6 | – | 5 |
| Montana State | 3 | – | 4 | 6 | – | 5 |
| Idaho State | 1 | – | 6 | 4 | – | 7 |
| Sacramento State | 0 | – | 7 | 1 | – | 10 |
| Portland State | 0 | – | 0 | 3 | – | 8 |
$ – Conference champion; ^ – NCAA Division I-AA playoff participant; Portland State games did not count in conference standings; Rankings from The Sports Network poll

The 1996 Weber State Wildcats football team represented Weber State University as a member of the Big Sky Conference during the 1996 NCAA Division I-AA football season. Led by eighth-year head coach Dave Arslanian, the Wildcats compiled an overall record of 7–4, with a mark of 4–3 in conference play, and finished tied for third in the Big Sky.

== Schedule ==
| Date | Time | Opponent | Rank | Site | Result | Attendance | Source |
|---|---|---|---|---|---|---|---|
| September 7 | | Eastern Washington | No. 23 | Wildcat Stadium; Ogden, UT | W 22–20 | 11,794 | |
| September 14 | | Western State (CO)* | No. 20 | Wildcat Stadium; Ogden, UT | W 36–3 | 8,713 | |
| September 21 | | at Cal Poly* | No. 17 | Mustang Stadium; San Luis Obispo, CA | W 30–20 | | |
| September 28 | | at Toledo* | No. 14 | Glass Bowl; Toledo, OH | L 24–31 | 23,927 | |
| October 5 | | at No. 12 Northern Arizona | No. 18 | Walkup Skydome; Flagstaff, AZ | L 45–59 | 13,877 | |
| October 12 | | Cal State Northridge | No. 21 | Wildcat Stadium; Ogden, UT | L 28–35 | 10,503 | |
| October 19 | | at Portland State | | Civic Stadium; Portland, OR | W 35–10 | 8,194 | |
| November 2 | | Montana State | | Wildcat Stadium; Ogden, UT | W 17–7 | 6,102 | |
| November 9 | | at Sacramento State | | Hornet Stadium; Sacramento, CA | W 41–31 | 2,164 | |
| November 16 | 12:05 p.m. | No. 2 Montana | | Wildcat Stadium; Ogden, UT | L 10–24 | 7,816 | |
| November 23 | | at Idaho State | | Holt Arena; Pocatello, ID | W 37–22 | 5,011 | |
*Non-conference game; Rankings from The Sports Network Poll released prior to the game
