= 1996 Southwest Missouri State Bears football team =

American college football season

1996 Southwest Missouri State Bears football
- Conference: Gateway Football Conference
- Record: 7–4 (3–2 GFC)
- Head coach: Del Miller (2nd season)
- Offensive coordinator: Mitch Ware (1st season)
- Defensive coordinator: Mike Kolling (5th season)
- Captains: Michael Cosey; Earnest Grayson; Mike Miano; Jeremy Hoog; Paxton Parker; Travis Richardson
- Home stadium: Plaster Sports Complex

1996 Gateway Football Conference standings
	Conf.			Overall
Team	W		L	W		L
No. 3 Northern Iowa $^	5	–	0	12	–	2
No. 10 Western Illinois ^	3	–	2	9	–	3
No. 21 Southwest Missouri State	3	–	2	7	–	4
Indiana State	3	–	2	6	–	5
Southern Illinois	1	–	4	5	–	6
Illinois State	0	–	5	3	–	8
$ – Conference champion; ^ – NCAA Division I-AA playoff participant; Rankings from The Sports Network poll

The 1996 Southwest Missouri State Bears football team represented Southwest Missouri State University (now known as Missouri State University) as a member of the Gateway Football Conference (GFC) during the 1996 NCAA Division I-AA football season. Led by second-year head coach Del Miller, the Bears compiled an overall record of 7–4, with a mark of 3–2 in conference play, and finished tied for second in the GFC.

== Schedule ==
Date	Time	Opponent	Rank	Site	Result	Attendance	Source
August 31	6:00 p.m.	at Oklahoma State*		Lewis Field; Stillwater, OK	L 20–23 ^{OT}	33,500	
September 7		at No. 3 McNeese State*	No. 21	Cowboy Stadium; Lake Charles, LA	W 12–7	14,059	
September 14		Truman State*	No. 14	Plaster Sports Complex; Springfield, MO	W 44–13	15,097	
September 21		at Tennessee–Martin*	No. 10	Graham Stadium; Martin, TN	W 39–7		
September 28	7:00 p.m.	Jacksonville State*	No. 8	Plaster Sports Complex; Springfield, MO	W 34–9	13,061	
October 5		Southern Illinois	No. 7	Plaster Sports Complex; Springfield, MO	W 24–17	14,906	
October 19		at No. 3 Northern Iowa	No. 5	UNI-Dome; Cedar Falls, IA	L 31–38	14,727	
October 26		at Illinois State	No. 9	Hancock Stadium; Normal, IL	W 24–13	9,552	
November 2		No. 13 Western Illinois	No. 7	Plaster Sports Complex; Springfield, MO	L 17–23	15,878	
November 9		No. 23 Youngstown State*	No. 14	Plaster Sports Complex; Springfield, MO	L 13–17	6,963	
November 16		at Indiana State	No. 20	Memorial Stadium; Terre Haute, IN	W 27–12		
*Non-conference game; Rankings from The Sports Network Poll released prior to the game; All times are in Central time
