= 1996 South Carolina State Bulldogs football team =

American college football season

1996 South Carolina State Bulldogs football
- Conference: Mid-Eastern Athletic Conference
- Record: 4–6 (4–3 MEAC)
- Head coach: Willie Jeffries (14th season)
- Home stadium: Oliver C. Dawson Stadium

1996 Mid-Eastern Athletic Conference football standings
	Conf.			Overall
Team	W		L	W		L
No. 12 Florida A&M $^	7	–	0	9	–	3
No. 20 Howard	6	–	1	10	–	2
North Carolina A&T	4	–	3	8	–	3
South Carolina State	4	–	3	4	–	6
Hampton	3	–	4	5	–	6
Morgan State	2	–	5	4	–	7
Delaware State	2	–	5	3	–	8
Bethune–Cookman	0	–	7	2	–	9
$ – Conference champion; ^ – NCAA Division I-AA playoff participant; Rankings from The Sports Network poll

The 1996 South Carolina State Bulldogs football team represented South Carolina State University as a member of the Mid-Eastern Athletic Conference (MEAC) during the 1996 NCAA Division I-AA football season. Led by 14th-year head coach Willie Jeffries, the Bulldogs compiled an overall record of 4–6, with a mark of 4–3 in conference play, and finished tied for third in the MEAC.

== Schedule ==
Date	Opponent	Site	Result	Attendance	Source
August 31	No. 18 Georgia Southern*	Oliver C. Dawson Stadium; Orangeburg, SC	L 14–21	9,526	
September 7	at Charleston Southern*	Buccaneer Field; North Charleston, SC	Canceled (Note: The game against Charleston Southern scheduled for September 7 was canceled due to the impacts of Hurricane Fran.)		
September 14	at No. 21 Furman*	Paladin Stadium; Greenville, SC	L 13–27	12,225	
September 28	Johnson C. Smith*	Oliver C. Dawson Stadium; Orangeburg, SC	L 21–38		
October 5	Morgan State	Oliver C. Dawson Stadium; Orangeburg, SC	W 27–20	5,789	
October 19	Bethune–Cookman	Oliver C. Dawson Stadium; Orangeburg, SC	W 20–18	19,648	
October 26	Hampton	Oliver C. Dawson Stadium; Orangeburg, SC	L 14–20	4,787	
November 2	at Delaware State	Alumni Stadium; Dover, DE	W 34–14		
November 9	Howard	Oliver C. Dawson Stadium; Orangeburg, SC	L 3–23	5,561	
November 16	vs. No. 16 Florida A&M	Georgia Dome; Atlanta, GA (Budweiser Super Showdown)	L 6–20	24,800	
November 23	vs. North Carolina A&T	American Legion Memorial Stadium; Charlotte, NC (Carolinas Classic, rivalry)	W 35–0	21,282	
*Non-conference game; Rankings from The Sports Network Poll released prior to the game
