= 1996 Howard Bison football team =

American college football season

1996 Howard Bison football

Black college national champion

Heritage Bowl, W 27–24 vs. Southern
- Conference: Mid-Eastern Athletic Conference
- Record: 10–2 (6–1 MEAC)
- Head coach: Steve Wilson (8th season)
- Home stadium: William H. Greene Stadium; RFK Stadium

1996 Mid-Eastern Athletic Conference football standings
	Conf.			Overall
Team	W		L	W		L
No. 12 Florida A&M $^	7	–	0	9	–	3
No. 20 Howard	6	–	1	10	–	2
North Carolina A&T	4	–	3	8	–	3
South Carolina State	4	–	3	4	–	6
Hampton	3	–	4	5	–	6
Morgan State	2	–	5	4	–	7
Delaware State	2	–	5	3	–	8
Bethune–Cookman	0	–	7	2	–	9
$ – Conference champion; ^ – NCAA Division I-AA playoff participant; Rankings from The Sports Network poll

The 1996 Howard Bison football team represented Howard University as a member of the Mid-Eastern Athletic Conference (MEAC) during the 1996 NCAA Division I-AA football season. Led by eighth-year head coach Steve Wilson, the Bison compiled an overall record of 10–2, with a conference record of 6–1, and finished second in the MEAC. At the conclusion of the season, the Bison were also recognized as black college national champion after they defeated Southern in the Heritage Bowl.

== Schedule ==
Date	Opponent	Rank	Site	Result	Attendance	Source
September 7	at No. 1 Marshall*		Marshall University Stadium; Huntington, WV	L 27–55	26,054	
September 13	Hampton		RFK Stadium; Washington, DC (rivalry)	W 26–7	22,569	
September 21	Virginia State*		William H. Greene Stadium; Washington, DC	W 31–7		
September 28	at No. 21 Florida A&M		Bragg Memorial Stadium; Tallahassee, FL	L 20–21	7,741	
October 12	Bethune–Cookman		William H. Greene Stadium; Washington, DC	W 61–21	9,869	
October 19	at Morehouse*		B. T. Harvey Stadium; Atlanta, GA	W 49–0	12,123	
October 26	North Carolina A&T		RFK Stadium; Washington, DC	W 38–3	21,357	
November 2	Norfolk State*		William H. Greene Stadium; Washington, DC	W 42–14	14,169	
November 9	at South Carolina State		Oliver C. Dawson Stadium; Orangeburg, SC	W 23–3	5,561	
November 16	Morgan State	No. 23	William H. Greene Stadium; Washington, DC (rivalry)	W 49–0	3,501	
November 23	Delaware State	No. 21	William H. Greene Stadium; Washington, DC	W 48–23		
December 21	Southern*	No. 20	Georgia Dome; Atlanta, GA (Heritage Bowl)	W 27–24	18,126	
*Non-conference game; Rankings from The Sports Network Poll released prior to the game
