= 1996 Morgan State Bears football team =

American college football season

1996 Morgan State Bears football
- Conference: Mid-Eastern Athletic Conference
- Record: 4–7 (2–5 MEAC)
- Head coach: Stump Mitchell (1st season)
- Home stadium: Hughes Stadium

1996 Mid-Eastern Athletic Conference football standings
	Conf.			Overall
Team	W		L	W		L
No. 12 Florida A&M $^	7	–	0	9	–	3
No. 20 Howard	6	–	1	10	–	2
North Carolina A&T	4	–	3	8	–	3
South Carolina State	4	–	3	4	–	6
Hampton	3	–	4	5	–	6
Morgan State	2	–	5	4	–	7
Delaware State	2	–	5	3	–	8
Bethune–Cookman	0	–	7	2	–	9
$ – Conference champion; ^ – NCAA Division I-AA playoff participant; Rankings from The Sports Network poll

The 1996 Morgan State Bears football team represented Morgan State University as a member of the Mid-Eastern Athletic Conference (MEAC) during the 1996 NCAA Division I-AA football season. Led by first-year head coach Stump Mitchell, the Bears compiled an overall record of 4–7, with a mark of 2–5 in conference play, and finished tied for sixth in the MEAC.

== Schedule ==
Date	Opponent	Site	Result	Attendance	Source
August 31	vs. Central State (OH)*	Ohio Stadium; Columbus, OH (Capital City Classic)	L 17–18	12,500	
September 14	Bethune–Cookman	Hughes Stadium; Baltimore, MD	W 13–6		
September 21	Liberty*	Hughes Stadium; Baltimore, MD	W 34–28 ^{OT}	1,558	
September 28	vs. Cheyney*	Drexel University Field; Philadelphia, PA (Wade Wilson Classic)	W 29–0	1,500	
October 5	at South Carolina State	Oliver C. Dawson Stadium; Orangeburg, SC	L 20–27	5,789	
October 19	at North Carolina A&T	Aggie Stadium; Greensboro, NC	L 7–55		
October 26	Delaware State	Hughes Stadium; Baltimore, MD	L 14–35	7,686	
November 3	at No. 12 Florida A&M	Bragg Memorial Stadium; Tallahassee, FL	L 12–83		
November 9	at Texas Southern*	Rice Stadium; Houston, TX	L 3–42		
November 16	at No. 23 Howard	William H. Greene Stadium; Washington, DC (rivalry)	L 0–49	3,501	
November 23	Hampton	Hughes Stadium; Baltimore, MD	W 23–22	1,275	
*Non-conference game; Rankings from The Sports Network Poll released prior to the game
