= 1996 Bethune–Cookman Wildcats football team =

American college football season

1996 Bethune–Cookman Wildcats football
- Conference: Mid-Eastern Athletic Conference
- Record: 2–9 (0–7 MEAC)
- Head coach: Cy McClairen (15th season)
- Home stadium: Municipal Stadium

1996 Mid-Eastern Athletic Conference football standings
| | Conf. | | | Overall |
| Team | W | | L | W | | L |
|---|---|---|---|---|---|---|
| No. 12 Florida A&M $^ | 7 | – | 0 | 9 | – | 3 |
| No. 20 Howard | 6 | – | 1 | 10 | – | 2 |
| North Carolina A&T | 4 | – | 3 | 8 | – | 3 |
| South Carolina State | 4 | – | 3 | 4 | – | 6 |
| Hampton | 3 | – | 4 | 5 | – | 6 |
| Morgan State | 2 | – | 5 | 4 | – | 7 |
| Delaware State | 2 | – | 5 | 3 | – | 8 |
| Bethune–Cookman | 0 | – | 7 | 2 | – | 9 |
$ – Conference champion; ^ – NCAA Division I-AA playoff participant; Rankings from The Sports Network poll

The 1996 Bethune–Cookman Wildcats football team represented Bethune–Cookman College (now known as Bethune–Cookman University) as a member of the Mid-Eastern Athletic Conference (MEAC) during the 1996 NCAA Division I-AA football season. Led by 15th-year head coach Cy McClairen, the Wildcats compiled an overall record of 2–9, with a mark of 0–7 in conference play, and finished eighth in the MEAC.

== Schedule ==
| Date | Opponent | Site | Result | Attendance | Source |
|---|---|---|---|---|---|
| August 31 | Morehouse* | Municipal Stadium; Daytona Beach, FL | L 20–24 | | |
| September 7 | Morris Brown* | Municipal Stadium; Daytona Beach, FL | W 23–16 | | |
| September 14 | at Morgan State | Hughes Stadium; Baltimore, MD | L 6–13 | | |
| September 21 | vs. Norfolk State* | Gator Bowl Stadium; Jacksonville, FL (Gateway Classic) | L 29–41 | | |
| October 5 | Delaware State | Municipal Stadium; Daytona Beach, FL | L 12–34 | | |
| October 12 | at Howard | William H. Greene Stadium; Washington, DC | L 21–61 | 9,869 | |
| October 19 | at South Carolina State | Oliver C. Dawson Stadium; Orangeburg, SC | L 18–20 | 19,648 | |
| November 2 | at North Carolina A&T | Aggie Stadium; Greensboro, NC | L 7–73 | | |
| November 9 | at Hampton | Armstrong Stadium; Hampton, VA | L 24–38 | | |
| November 16 | Valparaiso* | Municipal Stadium; Daytona Beach, FL | W 28–23 | | |
| November 23 | vs. No. 13 Florida A&M | Houlihan's Stadium; Tampa, FL (Florida Classic) | L 7–41 | | |
*Non-conference game; Rankings from The Sports Network Poll released prior to the game
