= 1996 Florida A&M Rattlers football team =

American college football season

1996 Florida A&M Rattlers football

MEAC champion

NCAA Division I-AA First Round, L 25–29 vs. Troy State
- Conference: Mid-Eastern Athletic Conference

Ranking
- Sports Network: No. 12
- Record: 9–3 (7–0 MEAC)
- Head coach: Billy Joe (3rd season)
- Offensive scheme: Gulf Coast
- Home stadium: Bragg Memorial Stadium

1996 Mid-Eastern Athletic Conference football standings
	Conf.			Overall
Team	W		L	W		L
No. 12 Florida A&M $^	7	–	0	9	–	3
No. 20 Howard	6	–	1	10	–	2
North Carolina A&T	4	–	3	8	–	3
South Carolina State	4	–	3	4	–	6
Hampton	3	–	4	5	–	6
Morgan State	2	–	5	4	–	7
Delaware State	2	–	5	3	–	8
Bethune–Cookman	0	–	7	2	–	9
$ – Conference champion; ^ – NCAA Division I-AA playoff participant; Rankings from The Sports Network poll

The 1996 Florida A&M Rattlers football team represented Florida A&M University as a member of the Mid-Eastern Athletic Conference (MEAC) during the 1996 NCAA Division I-AA football season. Led by third-year head coach Billy Joe, the Rattlers compiled an overall record of 9–3, with a mark of 7–0 in conference play, and finished as MEAC champion. Florida A&M completed their season with a loss against Troy State in the NCAA Division I-AA First Round.

== Schedule ==
Date	Opponent	Rank	Site	Result	Attendance	Source
August 31	at Tennessee State*		Vanderbilt Stadium; Nashville, TN	W 35–20	31,782	
September 7	Tuskegee*		Bragg Memorial Stadium; Tallahassee, FL	W 56–0	24,726	
September 21	at No. 6 Jackson State*	No. 22	Mississippi Veterans Memorial Stadium; Jackson, MS	L 9–16	38,500	
September 28	Howard	No. 21	Bragg Memorial Stadium; Tallahassee, FL	W 21–20	7,741	
October 5	vs. Hampton	No. 21	RCA Dome; Indianapolis, IN (Circle City Classic)	W 59–58 ^{6OT}	62,037	
October 12	North Carolina A&T	No. 16	Bragg Memorial Stadium; Tallahassee, FL	W 24–23		
October 19	at Delaware State	No. 15	Alumni Stadium; Dover, DE	W 47–26		
November 3	Morgan State	No. 12	Bragg Memorial Stadium; Tallahassee, FL	W 83–12		
November 9	at Southern*	No. 13	A. W. Mumford Stadium; Baton Rouge, LA	L 17–21	15,969	
November 16	vs. South Carolina State	No. 16	Georgia Dome; Atlanta, GA (Budweiser Super Showdown)	W 20–6	24,800	
November 23	vs. Bethune–Cookman	No. 13	Houlihan's Stadium; Tampa, FL (Florida Classic)	W 41–7		
November 30	at No. 5 Troy State*	No. 12	Veterans Memorial Stadium; Troy, AL (NCAA Division I-AA First Round)	L 29–25	10,200	
*Non-conference game; Rankings from NCAA Division I-AA Football Committee Poll released prior to the game
