= 1996 Montana Grizzlies football team =

American college football season

1996 Montana Grizzlies football

Big Sky champion

NCAA Division I-AA Championship, L 29–49 vs. Marshall
- Conference: Big Sky Conference

Ranking
- Sports Network: No. 2
- Record: 14–1 (8–0 Big Sky)
- Head coach: Mick Dennehy (1st season)
- Offensive coordinator: Brent Pease (1st season)
- Defensive coordinator: Jerome Souers (7th season)
- Home stadium: Washington–Grizzly Stadium

1996 Big Sky Conference football standings
	Conf.			Overall
Team	W		L	W		L
No. 2 Montana $^	7	–	0	14	–	1
No. 6 Northern Arizona ^	6	–	1	9	–	3
Cal State Northridge	4	–	3	7	–	4
Weber State	4	–	3	7	–	4
Eastern Washington	3	–	4	6	–	5
Montana State	3	–	4	6	–	5
Idaho State	1	–	6	4	–	7
Sacramento State	0	–	7	1	–	10
Portland State	0	–	0	3	–	8
$ – Conference champion; ^ – NCAA Division I-AA playoff participant; Portland State games did not count in conference standings; Rankings from The Sports Network poll

The 1996 Montana Grizzlies football team represented the University of Montana in the 1996 NCAA Division I-AA football season. The Grizzlies were led by first-year head coach Mick Dennehy and played their home games on campus in Missoula at Washington–Grizzly Stadium.

== Schedule ==
Date	Time	Opponent	Rank	Site	TV	Result	Attendance	Source
September 7	2:00 pm	at Oregon State*	No. 2	Parker Stadium; Corvallis, OR		W 35–14	28,166	
September 14	1:05 pm	Cal Poly*	No. 2	Washington–Grizzly Stadium; Missoula, MT		W 43–0	18,169	
September 28	7:05 pm	at Sacramento State	No. 2	Hornet Stadium; Sacramento, CA		W 35–17	7,423	
October 5	1:05 pm	Southern Utah*	No. 2	Washington–Grizzly Stadium; Missoula, MT		W 44–13	16,035	
October 12	1:05 pm	No. 23 Idaho State^{†}	No. 2	Washington–Grizzly Stadium; Missoula, MT		W 43–19	18,868	
October 19	2:05 pm	at No. 20 Eastern Washington	No. 2	Woodward Field; Cheney, WA (rivalry)		W 34–30	6,605	
October 26	12:05 pm	No. 6 Northern Arizona	No. 2	Washington–Grizzly Stadium; Missoula, MT	PSN	W 48–32	18,847	
November 2	6:05 pm	at Cal State Northridge	No. 2	North Campus Stadium; Northridge, CA		W 43–36	4,217	
November 9	12:05 pm	Portland State	No. 2	Washington–Grizzly Stadium; Missoula, MT	PSN	W 63–6	15,961	
November 16	12:05 pm	at Weber State	No. 2	Wildcat Stadium; Ogden, UT		W 24–10	7,816	
November 23	12:05 pm	Montana State	No. 2	Washington–Grizzly Stadium; Missoula, MT (rivalry)		W 35–14	19,042	
November 30	12:05 pm	No. 19 Nicholls State*	No. 2	Washington–Grizzly Stadium; Missoula, MT (NCAA Division I-AA First Round)		W 48–3	13,428	
December 7	12:05 pm	No. 9 East Tennessee State*	No. 2	Washington–Grizzly Stadium; Missoula, MT (NCAA Division I-AA Quarterfinal)		W 44–14	15,025	
December 14	12:05 pm	No. 5 Troy State*	No. 2	Washington–Grizzly Stadium; Missoula, MT (NCAA Division I-AA Semifinal)		W 70–7	18,367	
December 21	12:05 pm	at No. 1 Marshall*	No. 2	Marshall University Stadium; Huntington, WV (NCAA NCAA Division I-AA Championship Game)	ESPN	L 29–49	30,052	
*Non-conference game; ^{†}Homecoming; Rankings from The Sports Network Poll released prior to the game; All times are in Mountain time
