= 1996 Hampton Pirates football team =

American college football season

1996 Hampton Pirates football
- Conference: Mid-Eastern Athletic Conference
- Record: 5–6 (3–4 MEAC)
- Head coach: Joe Taylor (5th season)
- Home stadium: Armstrong Stadium

1996 Mid-Eastern Athletic Conference football standings
	Conf.			Overall
Team	W		L	W		L
No. 12 Florida A&M $^	7	–	0	9	–	3
No. 20 Howard	6	–	1	10	–	2
North Carolina A&T	4	–	3	8	–	3
South Carolina State	4	–	3	4	–	6
Hampton	3	–	4	5	–	6
Morgan State	2	–	5	4	–	7
Delaware State	2	–	5	3	–	8
Bethune–Cookman	0	–	7	2	–	9
$ – Conference champion; ^ – NCAA Division I-AA playoff participant; Rankings from The Sports Network poll

The 1996 Hampton Pirates football team represented Hampton University as a member of the Mid-Eastern Athletic Conference (MEAC) during the 1996 NCAA Division I-AA football season. Led by fifth-year head coach Joe Taylor, the Pirates compiled an overall record of 5–6, with a mark of 3–4 in conference play, and finished fifth in the MEAC.

== Schedule ==
Date	Opponent	Site	Result	Attendance	Source
September 1	at Clark Atlanta*	Georgia Dome; Atlanta, GA	W 13–6	12,000	
September 13	at Howard	RFK Stadium; Washington, DC (rivalry)	L 7–26	22,569	
September 21	North Carolina A&T	Armstrong Stadium; Hampton, VA	L 20–24	10,961	
September 28	vs. Virginia State*	Giants Stadium; East Rutherford, NJ (XXVI New York Urban League Football Classic)	W 14–10	43,289	
October 5	vs. No. 21 Florida A&M	RCA Dome; Indianapolis, IN (Circle City Classic)	L 58–59 ^{6OT}	62,037	
October 12	at Delaware State	Alumni Stadium; Dover, DE	W 37–7	3,600	
October 26	at South Carolina State	Oliver C. Dawson Stadium; Orangeburg, SC	W 20–14	4,787	
November 2	Liberty*	Armstrong Stadium; Hampton, VA	L 30–34	2,059	
November 9	Bethune–Cookman	Armstrong Stadium; Hampton, VA	W 38–24		
November 16	Norfolk State*	Armstrong Stadium; Hampton, VA (rivalry)	L 7–14		
November 23	at Morgan State	Hughes Stadium; Baltimore, MD	W 22–23	1,275	
*Non-conference game; Rankings from The Sports Network Poll released prior to the game
