= 1996 UC Davis Aggies football team =

American college football season

1996 UC Davis Aggies football

NCAA Division II Semifinal, L 26–29 at Carson–Newman
- Conference: Independent
- Record: 8–5
- Head coach: Bob Biggs (4th season)
- Offensive coordinator: Mike Moroski (4th season)
- Home stadium: Toomey Field

1996 NCAA Division II independents football records
	Conf.			Overall
Team	W		L	W		L
Saint Joseph's (IN)		–		9	–	2
No. 17 UC Davis ^		–		8	–	5
Albany		–		7	–	3
New Haven		–		7	–	3
Southern Connecticut State		–		7	–	4
American International		–		6	–	4
Pace		–		6	–	4
Mercyhurst		–		4	–	5
Mississippi College		–		4	–	6
Western New Mexico		–		3	–	6
Wayne State (NE)		–		3	–	7
Kentucky Wesleyan		–		3	–	8
Gannon		–		2	–	8
Quincy		–		1	–	8
^ – NCAA Division II playoff participant; Rankings from NCAA Division II Football Committee poll

The 1996 UC Davis football team represented the University of California, Davis as an independent during the 1996 NCAA Division II football season. Led by fourth-year head coach Bob Biggs, UC Davis compiled an overall record of 8–5. 1996 was the 27th consecutive winning season for the Aggies. UC Davis was ranked No. 17 in the NCAA Division II poll at the end of the regular season and advanced to the NCAA Division II Football Championship playoffs, where they upset top-ranked Texas A&M–Kingsville in Kingsville, Texas in the first round. In the quarterfinals, the Aggies upset ninth-ranked Central Oklahoma at home. In the semifinals, they were defeated by sixth-ranked Carson–Newman in Jefferson City, Tennessee. The team outscored its opponents 369 to 240 for the season. The Aggies played home games at Toomey Field in Davis, California.

== Schedule ==
Date	Time	Opponent	Rank	Site	Result	Attendance	Source
September 14		at Cal State Northridge	No. 16	North Campus Stadium; Northridge, CA	L 31–56	4,264	
September 21		Sacramento State		Toomey Field; Davis, CA (Causeway Classic)	L 24–27	11,140	
September 28		at Chico State		University Stadium; Chico, CA	W 20–6	6,325–7,130	
October 5		at Humboldt State	No. 20	Redwood Bowl; Arcata, CA	W 50–13	4,232–4,323	
October 12		at Portland State	No. 17	Civic Stadium; Portland, OR	L 27–32	7,738	
October 19		Western New Mexico		Toomey Field; Davis, CA	W 29–3	7,738	
October 26		Saint Mary's	No. 17	Toomey Field; Davis, CA	W 31–10	7,840	
November 2		at Cal Poly	No. 12	Mustang Stadium; San Luis Obispo, CA (rivalry)	L 13–17	8,216	
November 9		at Sonoma State	No. 17	Cossacks Stadium (Note: Seawolf Stadium was known as Cossacks Stadium until 2002 when the University changed the mascot from Cossacks to Seawolves.); Rohnert Park, CA	W 49–7	1,205	
November 16		Southern Utah	No. 17	Toomey Field; Davis, CA	W 26–19	2,250	
November 23	11:00 a.m.	at No. 1 Texas A&M–Kingsville	No. 17	Javelina Stadium; Kingsville, TX (NCAA Division II First Round)	W 17–14	8,500	
November 30	1:00 p.m.	No. 9 Central Oklahoma	No. 17	Toomey Field; Davis, CA (NCAA Division II Quarterfinal)	W 26–7	7,339	
December 7	10:00 a.m.	at No. 6 Carson–Newman	No. 17	Burke–Tarr Stadium; Jefferson City, TN (NCAA Division II Semifinal)	L 26–29	3,214	
Rankings from NCAA Division II Football Committee Poll released prior to the game; All times are in Pacific time
