= 1996 Montana State Bobcats football team =

American college football season

1996 Montana State Bobcats football
- Conference: Big Sky Conference
- Record: 6–5 (3–4 Big Sky)
- Head coach: Cliff Hysell (5th season)
- Home stadium: Sales Stadium

1996 Big Sky Conference football standings
	Conf.			Overall
Team	W		L	W		L
No. 2 Montana $^	7	–	0	14	–	1
No. 6 Northern Arizona ^	6	–	1	9	–	3
Cal State Northridge	4	–	3	7	–	4
Weber State	4	–	3	7	–	4
Eastern Washington	3	–	4	6	–	5
Montana State	3	–	4	6	–	5
Idaho State	1	–	6	4	–	7
Sacramento State	0	–	7	1	–	10
Portland State	0	–	0	3	–	8
$ – Conference champion; ^ – NCAA Division I-AA playoff participant; Portland State games did not count in conference standings; Rankings from The Sports Network poll

The 1996 Montana State Bobcats football team was an American football team that represented Montana State University in the Big Sky Conference (Big Sky) during the 1996 NCAA Division I-AA football season. In their fifth season under head coach Cliff Hysell, the Bobcats compiled a 6–5 record (3–4 against Big Sky opponents) and tied for fifth place in the Big Sky.

== Schedule ==
Date	Opponent	Site	Result	Attendance	Source
September 14	at Nevada*	Mackay Stadium; Reno, NV	L 7–31	23,210	
September 21	Minnesota–Duluth*	Sales Stadium; Bozeman, MT	W 37–0	8,207	
September 28	No. 17 Idaho State	Sales Stadium; Bozeman, MT	W 17–13	9,607	
October 5	at Eastern Washington	Woodward Field; Cheney, WA	L 13–20	5,027	
October 12	No. 10 Northern Arizona^{†}	Sales Stadium; Bozeman, MT	L 19–48	12,967	
October 19	at Cal State Northridge	North Campus Stadium; Northridge, CA	W 24–17	5,631	
October 26	Portland State	Sales Stadium; Bozeman, MT	W 24–6	4,227	
November 2	at Weber State	Wildcat Stadium; Ogden, UT	L 7–17	6,102	
November 9	Cal Poly*	Sales Stadium; Bozeman, MT	W 37–20	3,607	
November 16	at Sacramento State	Hornet Stadium; Sacramento, CA	W 49–14	2,107	
November 23	at No. 2 Montana	Washington–Grizzly Stadium; Missoula, MT (rivalry)	L 14–35	19,042	
*Non-conference game; ^{†}Homecoming; Rankings from The Sports Network Poll released prior to the game

== Roster ==
1996 Montana State Bobcats football team roster
Players
Coaches
Offense

Pos.	#	Name	Class
WR	1	Kenyatte Morgan	Jr
QB	2	Duncan McLean	Fr

Defense

Pos.	#	Name	Class

Special teams

Pos.	#	Name	Class

Head coach

- Cliff Hysell

Coordinators/assistant coaches

Legend

- (C) Team captain
- (S) Suspended
- (I) Ineligible
- Injured
- Redshirt

Roster
