= 1996 Northern Colorado Bears football team =

American college football season

1996 Northern Colorado Bears football

NCAA Division II champion

NCAA Division II Championship Game, W 23–14 vs. Carson–Newman
- Conference: North Central Conference
- Record: 12–3 (6–3 NCC)
- Head coach: Joe Glenn (8th season)
- Home stadium: Nottingham Field

1996 North Central Conference football standings
	Conf.			Overall
Team	W		L	W		L
No. T–4 Nebraska–Omaha $^	8	–	1	10	–	2
No. 15 Northern Colorado ^	6	–	3	12	–	3
No. 19 North Dakota	6	–	3	7	–	3
South Dakota State	6	–	3	7	–	4
North Dakota State	5	–	4	6	–	4
South Dakota	4	–	5	6	–	5
Mankato State	4	–	5	5	–	6
St. Cloud State	4	–	5	5	–	6
Augustana (SD)	2	–	7	3	–	8
Morningside	0	–	9	1	–	10
$ – Conference champion; ^ – NCAA Division II playoff participant; Rankings from NCAA Division II Football Committee poll

The 1996 Northern Colorado Bears football team was an American football team that won the 1996 NCAA Division II national championship.

The team represented the University of Northern Colorado in the North Central Conference (NCC) during the 1996 NCAA Division II football season. In their eighth season under head coach Joe Glenn, the Bears compiled a 12–3 record (6–3 against conference opponents), outscored opponents by a total of 435 to 254, and tied for second place in the NCC. The team advanced to the playoffs and won the national championship by defeating Carson–Newman in the championship game.

The team played its home games at Nottingham Field in Greeley, Colorado.

== Schedule ==
Date	Opponent	Rank	Site	Result	Attendance	Source
September 7	Western State (CO)*	No. 14	Nottingham Field; Greeley, CO	W 43–0	4,814	
September 14	at Mesa State*	No. 13	Stocker Stadium; Grand Junction, CO	W 59–14	600	
September 21	No. 5 North Dakota	No. 11	Nottingham Field; Greeley, CO	W 21–6	5,821	
September 28	at No. 19 South Dakota	No. 5	DakotaDome; Vermillion, SD	L 24–27 ^{OT}	7,834	
October 5	Mankato State		Nottingham Field; Greeley, CO	W 44–27	6,318	
October 12	North Dakota State	No. 19	Nottingham Field; Greeley, CO	W 38–36	4,521	
October 19	at No. 13 Nebraska–Omaha	No. 20	Al F. Caniglia Field; Omaha, NE	L 14–15	5,100	
October 26	at St. Cloud State		St. Cloud, MN	L 20–30	2,937	
November 2	South Dakota State		Nottingham Field; Greeley, CO	W 21–6	3,074	
November 9	at Morningside	No. T–17	Sioux City, IA	W 17–7	1.201	
November 16	at Augustana (SD)	No. 15	Sioux Falls, SD	W 41–7	500	
November 23	at No. 7 Pittsburg State*	No. 15	Carnie Smith Stadium; Pittsburg, KS (NCAA Division II first round)	W 24–21		
November 30	No. 2 Northwest Missouri State*	No. 15	Nottingham Field; Greeley, CO (NCAA Division II quarterfinal)	W 27–26		
December 7	at No. 8 Clarion*	No. 15	Clarion, PA (NCAA Division II semifinal)	W 19–18	4,000	
December 14	vs. No. 6 Carson–Newman*	No. 15	Braly Municipal Stadium; Florence, AL (NCAA Division II Championship Game)	W 23–14	5,745	
*Non-conference game; Rankings from NCAA Division II Football Committee Poll released prior to the game
