= 1996 Eastern Washington Eagles football team =

American college football season

1996 Eastern Washington Eagles football
- Conference: Big Sky Conference
- Record: 6–5 (3–4 Big Sky)
- Head coach: Mike Kramer (3rd season)
- Home stadium: Woodward Field

1996 Big Sky Conference football standings
	Conf.			Overall
Team	W		L	W		L
No. 2 Montana $^	7	–	0	14	–	1
No. 6 Northern Arizona ^	6	–	1	9	–	3
Cal State Northridge	4	–	3	7	–	4
Weber State	4	–	3	7	–	4
Eastern Washington	3	–	4	6	–	5
Montana State	3	–	4	6	–	5
Idaho State	1	–	6	4	–	7
Sacramento State	0	–	7	1	–	10
Portland State	0	–	0	3	–	8
$ – Conference champion; ^ – NCAA Division I-AA playoff participant; Portland State games did not count in conference standings; Rankings from The Sports Network poll

The 1996 Eastern Washington Eagles football team represented Eastern Washington University as a member of the Big Sky Conference during the 1996 NCAA Division I-AA football season. Led by third-year head coach Mike Kramer, the Eagles compiled an overall record of 6–5, with a mark of 3–4 in conference play, and finished tied for fifth in the Big Sky.

== Schedule ==
Date	Time	Opponent	Rank	Site	Result	Attendance	Source
September 7		at No. 23 Weber State		Wildcat Stadium; Ogden, UT	L 20–22	11,794	
September 14	6:05 p.m.	at Boise State*		Bronco Stadium; Boise, ID	W 27–21	18,595	
September 21		Southwest Texas State*		Woodward Field; Cheney, WA	W 38–7		
September 28		Portland State		Woodward Field; Cheney, WA	W 24–7	4,120	
October 5		Montana State		Woodward Field; Cheney, WA	W 20–13	5,027	
October 12		at Sacramento State		Hornet Stadium; Sacramento, CA	W 51–34	4,262	
October 19		No. 2 Montana	No. 20	Woodward Field; Cheney, WA (EWU–UM Governors Cup)	L 30–34	6,605	
October 26		at No. 25 Idaho State	No. 22	Holt Arena; Pocatello, ID	W 31–17		
November 2	3:05 p.m.	at Idaho*	No. 20	Kibbie Dome; Moscow, ID	L 27–37	10,107	
November 9		No. 6 Northern Arizona	No. 20	Woodward Field; Cheney, WA	L 10–13	3,915	
November 16		at Cal State Northridge	No. 24	North Campus Stadium; Northridge, CA	L 27–49		
*Non-conference game; Rankings from The Sports Network Poll released prior to the game
