= 1996 Northern Arizona Lumberjacks football team =

American college football season

1996 Northern Arizona Lumberjacks football

NCAA Division I-AA First Round, L 31–42 vs. Furman
- Conference: Big Sky Conference

Ranking
- Sports Network: No. 6
- Record: 9–3 (6–1 Big Sky)
- Head coach: Steve Axman (7th season)
- Defensive coordinator: Bill Busch (1st season)
- Home stadium: Walkup Skydome

1996 Big Sky Conference football standings
	Conf.			Overall
Team	W		L	W		L
No. 2 Montana $^	7	–	0	14	–	1
No. 6 Northern Arizona ^	6	–	1	9	–	3
Cal State Northridge	4	–	3	7	–	4
Weber State	4	–	3	7	–	4
Eastern Washington	3	–	4	6	–	5
Montana State	3	–	4	6	–	5
Idaho State	1	–	6	4	–	7
Sacramento State	0	–	7	1	–	10
Portland State	0	–	0	3	–	8
$ – Conference champion; ^ – NCAA Division I-AA playoff participant; Portland State games did not count in conference standings; Rankings from The Sports Network poll

The 1996 Northern Arizona Lumberjacks football team was an American football team that represented Northern Arizona University (NAU) as a member of the Big Sky Conference (Big Sky) during the 1996 NCAA Division I-AA football season. The team compiled a 9–3 record and was No. 6 in the NCAA Division I-AA playoff participant rankings. Running back Archie Amerson won the Walter Payton Award as the most outstanding offensive player in NCAA Division I-AA football.

== Schedule ==
Date	Opponent	Rank	Site	Result	Attendance	Source
August 31	Western New Mexico*	No. 20	Walkup Skydome; Flagstaff, AZ	W 75–0		
September 7	at New Mexico*	No. 16	University Stadium; Albuquerque, NM	L 33–49	24,892	
September 14	Southern Utah*	No. 16	Walkup Skydome; Flagstaff, AZ (rivalry)	W 43–13	8,021	
September 21	at Portland State	No. 16	Civic Stadium; Portland, OR	W 38–24	10,137	
September 28	Cal State Northridge	No. 13	Walkup Skydome; Flagstaff, AZ	W 32–14	9,028	
October 5	No. 18 Weber State^{†}	No. 12	Walkup Skydome; Flagstaff, AZ	W 59–45	13,877	
October 12	at Montana State	No. 10	Sales Stadium; Bozeman, MT	W 49–18	12,967	
October 19	Sacramento State	No. 7	Walkup Skydome; Flagstaff, AZ	W 51–32	14,471	
October 26	at No. 2 Montana	No. 6	Washington–Grizzly Stadium; Missoula, MT	L 32–48	18,847	
November 2	Idaho State	No. 8	Walkup Skydome; Flagstaff, AZ	W 50–38 ^{OT}	9,689	
November 9	at No. 20 Eastern Washington	No. 6	Woodward Field; Cheney, WA	W 13–10	3,915	
November 30	No. 13 Furman*	No. 6	Walkup Skydome; Flagstaff, AZ (NCAA Division I-AA First Round)	L 31–42	8,700	
*Non-conference game; ^{†}Homecoming; Rankings from The Sports Network Poll released prior to the game

== Season overview ==
In their seventh year under head coach Steve Axman, the Lumberjacks compiled a 9–3 record (6–1 against conference opponents), outscored opponents by a total of 506 to 333, and finished second out of nine teams in the Big Sky. The team played its home games at the J. Lawrence Walkup Skydome, commonly known as the Walkup Skydome, in Flagstaff, Arizona.

During the regular season, the team lost only two games, one against Division I-A New Mexico (33–49) and the other to No. 2 Montana (32–48).

The Lumberjacks were invited to play in the 1996 NCAA Division I-AA playoffs. In the program's first ever Division I-AA playoff game, they lost to Furman by a 42–31 score before a crowd of 8,700 at the Walkup Skydome.

== Statistical leaders and records ==
The team was led on offense by running back Archie Amerson. He rushed for 2,079 yards and 25 rushing touchdowns (both NAU records) and received the Walter Payton Award as the most outstanding offensive player in NCAA Division I-AA football. He had six 200-yard rushing games during the 1996 season, and his single-game totals of 289 yards against Portland State and 281 yards against Weber State rank among the top 10 rushing games in NAU history. His seven rushing touchdowns against Weber State established a Division I-AA record.

Quarterback Travis Brown also had a record-breaking season with 3,398 passing yards (then a school record) and also set NAU single-game records with 474 passing yards against Montana and seven passing touchdowns against Sacramento State.

Ricky Pearsall also set a Division I-AA record with 216 punt return yards against Western New Mexico.

The 1996 team also set the school's single-season scoring record with 63 touchdowns. Its 75-0 win over Western New Mexico was the largest point total and largest margin of victory in school history.
