= 1996 Portland State Vikings football team =

American college football season

1996 Portland State Vikings football
- Conference: Big Sky Conference
- Record: 3–8 (1–7 Big Sky)
- Head coach: Tim Walsh (4th season)
- Offensive scheme: Option
- Home stadium: Civic Stadium

1996 Big Sky Conference football standings
	Conf.			Overall
Team	W		L	W		L
No. 2 Montana $^	7	–	0	14	–	1
No. 6 Northern Arizona ^	6	–	1	9	–	3
Cal State Northridge	4	–	3	7	–	4
Weber State	4	–	3	7	–	4
Eastern Washington	3	–	4	6	–	5
Montana State	3	–	4	6	–	5
Idaho State	1	–	6	4	–	7
Sacramento State	0	–	7	1	–	10
Portland State	0	–	0	3	–	8
$ – Conference champion; ^ – NCAA Division I-AA playoff participant; Portland State games did not count in conference standings; Rankings from The Sports Network poll

The 1996 Portland State Vikings football team was an American football team that represented Portland State University during the 1996 NCAA Division I-AA football season as a member of the Big Sky Conference. In their fourth year under head coach Tim Walsh, the team compiled a 3–8 record.

The season marked the program's return to NCAA Division I-AA. The Vikings had previously played at the division I-AA level from 1978 to 1980.

== Schedule ==
Date	Opponent	Site	Result	Attendance	Source
September 7	at Boise State*	Bronco Stadium; Boise, ID	L 22–33	19,445	
September 14	Sonoma State*	Civic Stadium; Portland, OR	W 25–7	7,043	
September 21	No. 16 Northern Arizona	Civic Stadium; Portland, OR	L 24–38	10,137	
September 28	at Eastern Washington	Woodward Field; Cheney, WA	L 7–24	4,120	
October 5	at Cal State Northridge	North Campus Stadium; Northridge, CA	L 14–46	3,083	
October 12	UC Davis*	Civic Stadium; Portland, OR	W 32–27	7,738	
October 19	Weber State	Civic Stadium; Portland, OR	L 10–35	8,194	
October 26	at Montana State	Sales Stadium; Bozeman, MT	L 6–24	4,227	
November 2	Sacramento State	Civic Stadium; Portland, OR	W 38–31	8,030	
November 9	at No. 2 Montana	Washington–Grizzly Stadium; Missoula, MT	L 6–63	15,961	
November 16	Idaho State	Civic Stadium; Portland, OR	L 12–31	7,105	
*Non-conference game; Rankings from The Sports Network Poll released prior to the game
