= 1996 Illinois State Redbirds football team =

American college football season

1996 Illinois State Redbirds football
- Conference: Gateway Football Conference
- Record: 3–8 (0–5 GFC)
- Head coach: Todd Berry (1st season)
- Home stadium: Hancock Stadium

1996 Gateway Football Conference standings
	Conf.			Overall
Team	W		L	W		L
No. 3 Northern Iowa $^	5	–	0	12	–	2
No. 10 Western Illinois ^	3	–	2	9	–	3
No. 21 Southwest Missouri State	3	–	2	7	–	4
Indiana State	3	–	2	6	–	5
Southern Illinois	1	–	4	5	–	6
Illinois State	0	–	5	3	–	8
$ – Conference champion; ^ – NCAA Division I-AA playoff participant; Rankings from The Sports Network poll

The 1996 Illinois State Redbirds football team represented Illinois State University as a member of the Gateway Football Conference (GFC) during the 1996 NCAA Division I-AA football season. In their first year under head coach Todd Berry, the Redbirds compiled an overall record of 3–8, with a mark of 0–5 in conference play, and finished sixth in the GFC. Illinois State played home games at Hancock Stadium in Normal, Illinois.

== Schedule ==
Date	Opponent	Site	Result	Attendance	Source
August 29	at Buffalo*	University at Buffalo Stadium; Amherst, NY	L 35–41	8,291	
September 7	at North Texas*	Fouts Field; Denton, TX	L 14–20	15,617	
September 14	Southeast Missouri State*	Hancock Stadium; Normal, IL	W 29–0	7,688	
September 21	Youngstown State*	Hancock Stadium; Normal, IL	W 31–28 ^{2OT}	7,020	
September 28	Southern Illinois	Hancock Stadium; Normal, IL	L 35–38	11,630	
October 12	at No. 3 Northern Iowa	UNI-Dome; Cedar Falls, IA	L 10–47	14,522	
October 19	at No. 23 Indiana State	Memorial Stadium; Terre Haute, IN	L 7–23	7,049	
October 26	No. 9 Southwest Missouri State	Hancock Stadium; Normal, IL	L 13–24	9,552	
November 2	at UCF*	Florida Citrus Bowl; Orlando, FL	L 15–42	17,639	
November 9	at No. 10 Western Illinois	Hanson Field; Macomb, IL	L 11–28	5,714	
November 16	Tennessee Tech*	Hancock Stadium; Normal, IL	W 26–15	4,588	
*Non-conference game; Rankings from The Sports Network Poll released prior to the game
