= 1996 Youngstown State Penguins football team =

American college football season

1996 Youngstown State Penguins football
- Conference: Independent

Ranking
- Sports Network: No. 15
- Record: 8–3
- Head coach: Jim Tressel (11th season)
- Home stadium: Stambaugh Stadium

1996 NCAA Division I-AA independents football standings
| | Conf. | | | Overall |
| Team | W | | L | W | | L |
|---|---|---|---|---|---|---|
| Buffalo | | – | | 8 | – | 3 |
| No. 15 Youngstown State | | – | | 8 | – | 3 |
| Saint Mary's | | – | | 7 | – | 3 |
| Western Kentucky | | – | | 7 | – | 4 |
| Davidson | | – | | 6 | – | 4 |
| Towson | | – | | 6 | – | 4 |
| Samford | | – | | 6 | – | 5 |
| Wofford | | – | | 6 | – | 5 |
| Cal Poly | | – | | 5 | – | 6 |
| Hofstra | | – | | 5 | – | 6 |
| Liberty | | – | | 5 | – | 6 |
| Southern Utah | | – | | 4 | – | 7 |
| Charleston Southern | | – | | 2 | – | 8 |
| Morehead State | | – | | 2 | – | 8 |
| Jacksonville State | | – | | 1 | – | 9 |
^ – NCAA Division I-AA playoff participant; Rankings from The Sports Network poll

The 1996 Youngstown State Penguins football team was an American football team that represented Youngstown State University as an independent during the 1996 NCAA Division I-AA football season. Led by 11th-year head coach Jim Tressel, the team compiled a 8–3 record.

== Schedule ==
| Date | Opponent | Rank | Site | Result | Attendance | Source |
|---|---|---|---|---|---|---|
| August 29 | Wofford | | Stambaugh Stadium; Youngstown, OH | W 28–0 | 11,133 | |
| September 7 | Slippery Rock | | Stambaugh Stadium; Youngstown, OH | W 22–0 | | |
| September 14 | at Kent State | No. 25 | Dix Stadium; Kent, OH | L 12–28 | 23,158 | |
| September 21 | at Illinois State | | Hancock Stadium; Normal, IL | L 28–31 ^{2OT} | 7,020 | |
| September 28 | Clarion | | Stambaugh Stadium; Youngstown, OH | W 51–10 | | |
| October 12 | at Buffalo | | University at Buffalo Stadium; Amherst, NY | W 17–6 | 5,149 | |
| October 19 | Ashland | | Stambaugh Stadium; Youngstown, OH | W 38–3 | | |
| October 26 | No. 19 Northwestern State | | Stambaugh Stadium; Youngstown, OH | W 24–14 | | |
| November 2 | No. 3 Northern Iowa | No. 21 | Stambaugh Stadium; Youngstown, OH | L 10–23 | 12,507 | |
| November 9 | at No. 14 Southwest Missouri State | No. 23 | Plaster Sports Complex; Springfield, MO | W 16–13 | 6,963 | |
| November 16 | at Hofstra | No. 17 | Hofstra Stadium; Hempstead, NY | W 14–3 | 2,783 | |
Rankings from The Sports Network Poll released prior to the game
