= 1996 Sacramento State Hornets football team =

American college football season

1996 Sacramento State Hornets football
- Conference: Big Sky Conference
- Record: 1–10 (0–7 Big Sky)
- Head coach: John Volek (2nd season)
- Home stadium: Hornet Stadium

1996 Big Sky Conference football standings
	Conf.			Overall
Team	W		L	W		L
No. 2 Montana $^	7	–	0	14	–	1
No. 6 Northern Arizona ^	6	–	1	9	–	3
Cal State Northridge	4	–	3	7	–	4
Weber State	4	–	3	7	–	4
Eastern Washington	3	–	4	6	–	5
Montana State	3	–	4	6	–	5
Idaho State	1	–	6	4	–	7
Sacramento State	0	–	7	1	–	10
Portland State	0	–	0	3	–	8
$ – Conference champion; ^ – NCAA Division I-AA playoff participant; Portland State games did not count in conference standings; Rankings from The Sports Network poll

The 1996 Sacramento State Hornets football team represented California State University, Sacramento as a member of the Big Sky Conference during the 1996 NCAA Division I-AA football season. Led by second-year head coach John Volek, Sacramento State compiled an overall record of 1–10 with a mark of 0–7 in conference play, placing last out of eight teams in the Big Sky. The team was outscored by its opponents 466 to 248 for the season. The Hornets played home games at Hornet Stadium in Sacramento, California.

Sacramento State competed for the first time in the Big Sky Conference in 1996. They had been a member of the American West Conference (AWC) from 1993 to 1995.

== Schedule ==
Date	Opponent	Site	Result	Attendance	Source
September 7	at No. 11 Hofstra*	James M. Shuart Stadium; Hempstead, NY	L 3–33	4,486	
September 21	at UC Davis*	Toomey Field; Davis, CA (Causeway Classic)	W 27–24	11,140	
September 28	No. 2 Montana	Hornet Stadium; Sacramento, CA	L 17–35	7,423	
October 5	at No. 24 Idaho State	Holt Arena; Pocatello, ID	L 14–44	6,130	
October 12	Eastern Washington	Hornet Stadium; Sacramento, CA	L 34–51	4,262	
October 19	at No. 6 Northern Arizona	Walkup Skydome; Flagstaff, AZ	L 32–51	14,471	
October 26	Cal State Northridge	Hornet Stadium; Sacramento, CA	L 17–52	4,007	
November 2	at Portland State*	Civic Stadium; Portland, OR	L 31–38	8,030	
November 9	Weber State	Hornet Stadium; Sacramento, CA	L 31–41	2,164	
November 16	at Montana State	Reno H. Sales Stadium; Bozeman, MT	L 14–49	2,107	
November 23	Cal Poly*	Hornet Stadium; Sacramento, CA	L 28–48	3,398	
*Non-conference game; Rankings from The Sports Network Poll released prior to the game

== Team players in the NFL ==
The following Sacramento State players were selected in the 1997 NFL draft.

Player	Position	Round	Overall	NFL team
Daimon Shelton	Fullback	6	184	Jacksonville Jaguars
Tony Corbin	Quarterback	7	237	San Diego Chargers
