= 1996 Southern Illinois Salukis football team =

American college football season

1996 Southern Illinois Salukis football
- Conference: Gateway Football Conference
- Record: 5–6 (1–4 Gateway)
- Head coach: Shawn Watson (3rd season)
- Home stadium: McAndrew Stadium

1996 Gateway Football Conference standings
	Conf.			Overall
Team	W		L	W		L
No. 3 Northern Iowa $^	5	–	0	12	–	2
No. 10 Western Illinois ^	3	–	2	9	–	3
No. 21 Southwest Missouri State	3	–	2	7	–	4
Indiana State	3	–	2	6	–	5
Southern Illinois	1	–	4	5	–	6
Illinois State	0	–	5	3	–	8
$ – Conference champion; ^ – NCAA Division I-AA playoff participant; Rankings from The Sports Network poll

The 1996 Southern Illinois Salukis football team represented Southern Illinois University as a member of the Gateway Football Conference during the 1996 NCAA Division I-AA football season. They were led by third-year head coach Shawn Watson and played their home games at McAndrew Stadium in Carbondale, Illinois. The Salukis finished the season with a 5–6 record overall and a 1–4 record in conference play.

== Schedule ==
Date	Opponent	Site	Result	Attendance	Source
August 31	Central Arkansas*	McAndrew Stadium; Carbondale, IL	W 24–12	7,500	
September 7	Tennessee–Martin*	McAndrew Stadium; Carbondale, IL	W 27–14	5,000	
September 14	at No. 13 Murray State*	Roy Stewart Stadium; Murray, KY	L 38–48	8,023	
September 21	Winston-Salem State*	McAndrew Stadium; Carbondale, IL	W 48–18	5,200	
September 28	at Illinois State	Hancock Stadium; Normal, IL	W 38–35	11,630	
October 5	at No. 7 Southwest Missouri State	Plaster Sports Complex; Springfield, MO	L 17–24	14,906	
October 12	Indiana State	McAndrew Stadium; Carbondale, IL	L 13–24	10,300	
October 19	No. 17 Western Illinois^{†}	McAndrew Stadium; Carbondale, IL	L 19–26	11,300	
October 26	No. 3 Northern Iowa	McAndrew Stadium; Carbondale, IL	L 7–33	2,400	
November 2	at Western Kentucky*	L. T. Smith Stadium; Bowling Green, KY	L 37–51	5,800	
November 16	Southeast Missouri State*	McAndrew Stadium; Carbondale, IL	W 34–17	1,500	
*Non-conference game; ^{†}Homecoming; Rankings from The Sports Network Poll released prior to the game
