= 1996 Jacksonville State Gamecocks football team =

American college football season

1996 Jacksonville State Gamecocks football
- Conference: Independent
- Record: 1–9
- Head coach: Bill Burgess (12th season)
- Offensive coordinator: Charles Kelly (1st season)
- Defensive coordinator: Roland Houston (5th season)
- Home stadium: Paul Snow Stadium

1996 NCAA Division I-AA independents football standings
	Conf.			Overall
Team	W		L	W		L
Buffalo		–		8	–	3
No. 15 Youngstown State		–		8	–	3
Saint Mary's		–		7	–	3
Western Kentucky		–		7	–	4
Davidson		–		6	–	4
Towson		–		6	–	4
Samford		–		6	–	5
Wofford		–		6	–	5
Cal Poly		–		5	–	6
Hofstra		–		5	–	6
Liberty		–		5	–	6
Southern Utah		–		4	–	7
Charleston Southern		–		2	–	8
Morehead State		–		2	–	8
Jacksonville State		–		1	–	9
^ – NCAA Division I-AA playoff participant; Rankings from The Sports Network poll

The 1996 Jacksonville State Gamecocks football team represented Jacksonville State University as an independent during the 1996 NCAA Division I-AA football season. Led by Bill Burgess in his 12th and final season as head coach, the Gamecocks compiled a record of 1–9. Jacksonville State played home games at Paul Snow Stadium in Jacksonville, Alabama.

== Schedule ==
Date	Time	Opponent	Site	Result	Attendance	Source
September 7	7:00 p.m.	West Georgia	Paul Snow Stadium; Jacksonville, AL	L 10–30	13,023	
September 14	7:00 p.m.	at Nicholls State	John L. Guidry Stadium; Thibodaux, LA	L 8–21	5,749	
September 21	6:00 p.m.	at UAB	Legion Field; Birmingham, AL	L 17–24	19,567	
September 28	7:00 p.m.	at No. 8 Southwest Missouri State	Plaster Stadium; Springfield, MO	L 9–34	13,061	
October 5	2:00 p.m.	Middle Tennessee	Paul Snow Stadium; Jacksonville, AL	L 23–30	12,013	
October 12	2:00 p.m.	No. 20 Western Kentucky	Paul Snow Stadium; Jacksonville, AL	W 34–20	4,334	
October 19	2:00 p.m.	Samford	Paul Snow Stadium; Jacksonville, AL (rivalry)	L 17–27	10,334	
October 26	7:00 p.m.	No. 4 Troy State	Paul Snow Stadium; Jacksonville, AL (Battle for the Ol' School Bell)	L 21–31	11,500	
November 9	11:00 a.m.	at No. 9 Stephen F. Austin	Homer Bryce Stadium; Nacogdoches, TX	L 10–42	6,217	
November 16	7:00 p.m.	at Northeast Louisiana	Malone Stadium; Monroe, LA	L 28–31 ^{2OT}	10,562	
Rankings from The Sports Network Poll released prior to the game; All times are in Central time
