= 1996 Chico State Wildcats football team =

American college football season

1996 Chico State Wildcats football

NCAC champion
- Conference: Northern California Athletic Conference
- Record: 5–5 (3–1 NCAC)
- Head coach: Rob Tomlinson (1st season)
- Home stadium: University Stadium

1996 Northern California Athletic Conference football standings
| | Conf. | | | Overall |
| Team | W | | L | W | | L |
|---|---|---|---|---|---|---|
| Chico State $ | 3 | – | 1 | 5 | – | 5 |
| Sonoma State | 2 | – | 2 | 2 | – | 8 |
| Humboldt State | 1 | – | 3 | 3 | – | 7 |
$ – Conference champion

The 1996 Chico State Wildcats football team represented California State University, Chico as a member of the Northern California Athletic Conference (NCAC) during the 1996 NCAA Division II football season. Led by Rob Tomlinson in his first and only season as head coach, Chico State compiled an overall record of 5–5 with a mark of 3–1 in conference play, winning the NCAC title. The team was outscored by its opponents 187 to 181 for the season. The Wildcats played home games at University Stadium in Chico, California.

1996 was the last year Chico State played intercollegiate football. On February 5, 1997, the school announced it was dropping the football program citing the cost of the program and lack of fan support. In 2015, The Orion reported that some Chico State students expressed interest in the university having a football team again. Students interviewed for the article said they would attend and support football games if the university had a team.

== Schedule ==
| Date | Opponent | Site | Result | Attendance | Source |
|---|---|---|---|---|---|
| September 7 | San Diego* | University Stadium; Chico, CA | W 13–9 | 2,698 | |
| September 14 | Western Oregon* | University Stadium; Chico, CA | W 21–17 | 2,255 | |
| September 21 | at Montana Tech* | Alumni Coliseum; Butte, MT | L 21–23 | 1,250 | |
| September 28 | UC Davis* | University Stadium; Chico, CA | L 6–20 | 6,325–7,130 | |
| October 5 | at Chapman* | Chapman stadium; Orange, CA | L 15–44 | 3,203 | |
| October 19 | Humboldt State | University Stadium; Chico, CA | W 39–14 | 5,226 | |
| October 26 | Azusa Pacific* | University Stadium; Chico, CA | L 21–22 | 675 | |
| November 2 | at Sonoma State | Cossacks Stadium; Rohnert Park, CA | L 7–9 | 567 | |
| November 9 | at Humboldt State | Redwood Bowl; Arcata, CA | W 13–9 | 1,900 | |
| November 16 | Sonoma State | University Stadium; Chico, CA | W 25–20 | 787 | |
*Non-conference game
