= 1996 Samford Bulldogs football team =

American college football season

1996 Samford Bulldogs football
- Conference: Independent
- Record: 6–5
- Head coach: Pete Hurt (3rd season)
- Offensive coordinator: Roger Carr (3rd season)
- Defensive coordinator: Pete Hurt (4th season)
- Home stadium: Seibert Stadium

1996 NCAA Division I-AA independents football standings
	Conf.			Overall
Team	W		L	W		L
Buffalo		–		8	–	3
No. 15 Youngstown State		–		8	–	3
Saint Mary's		–		7	–	3
Western Kentucky		–		7	–	4
Davidson		–		6	–	4
Towson		–		6	–	4
Samford		–		6	–	5
Wofford		–		6	–	5
Cal Poly		–		5	–	6
Hofstra		–		5	–	6
Liberty		–		5	–	6
Southern Utah		–		4	–	7
Charleston Southern		–		2	–	8
Morehead State		–		2	–	8
Jacksonville State		–		1	–	9
^ – NCAA Division I-AA playoff participant; Rankings from The Sports Network poll

The 1996 Samford Bulldogs football team represented Samford University as an independent during the 1996 NCAA Division I-AA football season. Led by third-year head coach Pete Hurt, the Bulldogs compiled an overall record of 6–5. The team played home games at Seibert Stadium in Homewood, Alabama.

== Schedule ==
Date	Time	Opponent	Site	Result	Attendance	Source
September 7		Knoxville	Seibert Stadium; Homewood, AL	W 28–13		
September 14		Austin Peay	Seibert Stadium; Homewood, AL	W 12–10		
September 21		at Tennessee Tech	Tucker Stadium; Cookeville, TN	L 10–20		
September 28		Alcorn State	Seibert Stadium; Homewood, AL	W 14–13		
October 5		Nicholls State	Seibert Stadium; Homewood, AL	L 3–10		
October 12		at UCF	Florida Citrus Bowl; Orlando, FL	L 6–38	12,122	
October 19	2:00 p.m.	at Jacksonville State	Paul Snow Stadium; Jacksonville, AL (rivalry)	W 27–17	10,334	
October 26		at No. 12 Stephen F. Austin	Homer Bryce Stadium; Nacogdoches, TX	L 14–43		
November 2		Wofford^{†}	Seibert Stadium; Homewood, AL	W 20–14	5,837	
November 16		Tennessee–Martin	Seibert Stadium; Homewood, AL	W 31–12		
November 21		at No. 5 Troy State	Veterans Memorial Stadium; Troy, AL	L 10–50		
^{†}Homecoming; Rankings from The Sports Network Poll released prior to the game; All times are in Central time
