= 1996 NCAA Division II football season =

American college football season

- Regular season: September 7 – November 16, 1996
- Playoffs: November 23 – December 14, 1996
- National Championship: Braly Municipal Stadium; Florence, AL
- Champion: Northern Colorado
- Harlon Hill Trophy: Jarrett Anderson, Truman

The 1996 NCAA Division II football season, part of college football in the United States organized by the National Collegiate Athletic Association at the Division II level, began on September 7, 1996, and concluded with the NCAA Division II Football Championship on December 14, 1996, at Braly Municipal Stadium in Florence, Alabama, hosted by the University of North Alabama. The Northern Colorado Bears defeated the Carson–Newman, 23–14, to win their first Division II national title.

The Harlon Hill Trophy was awarded to Jarrett Anderson, running back from Truman.

== Conference and program changes ==
=== Conference changes ===
Team	1995 conference	1996 conference
Jacksonville State	D-II independent	I-AA independent
Mississippi College	Gulf South Conference	D-II independent
Portland State	D-II independent	Big Sky Conference (I-AA)
Saint Joseph's (IN)	MIFC	D-II independent

=== Program changes ===
- After East Texas State University joined the Texas A&M University System in 1996 and changed its name to Texas A&M University–Commerce, the East Texas State Lions became the Texas A&M–Commerce Lions.
- After Northeast Missouri State University changed its name to Truman State University in 1996, the Northeast Missouri State Bulldogs became the Truman Bulldogs.

== Conference standings ==
1996 Central Intercollegiate Athletic Association football standings
	Conf.			Overall
Team	W		L	W		L
Virginia State $	7	–	1	8	–	3
Livingstone	7	–	1	8	–	2
Norfolk State	6	–	2	7	–	4
North Carolina Central	5	–	3	8	–	3
Johnson C. Smith	5	–	3	7	–	3
Elizabeth City State	4	–	4	4	–	6
Winston-Salem State	3	–	5	4	–	7
Bowie State	2	–	6	3	–	7
Fayetteville State	1	–	7	2	–	8
Virginia Union	1	–	7	2	–	8
$ – Conference champion

1996 Eastern Collegiate Football Conference standings
	Conf.			Overall
Team	W		L	W		L
Salve Regina $	8	–	0	9	–	0
Bentley	7	–	1	7	–	3
Stonehill	7	–	2	8	–	2
Sacred Heart	4	–	3	4	–	6
Merrimack	5	–	4	5	–	4
UMass Lowell	4	–	4	6	–	4
MIT	3	–	5	4	–	5
Nichols	2	–	5	2	–	8
Western New England	2	–	6	2	–	7
Curry	1	–	7	3	–	7
Assumption	1	–	8	1	–	9
$ – Conference champion

1996 Gulf South Conference football standings
	Conf.			Overall
Team	W		L	W		L
No. T–4 Valdosta State $^	6	–	2	10	–	3
No. 12 West Georgia ^	5	–	2	9	–	3
Delta State	6	–	3	6	–	4
Central Arkansas	5	–	3	6	–	5
North Alabama	4	–	4	6	–	5
Henderson State	4	–	4	5	–	6
Arkansas Tech	3	–	5	5	–	6
Arkansas–Monticello	3	–	5	5	–	6
Southern Arkansas	2	–	5	4	–	6
West Alabama	1	–	6	3	–	7
$ – Conference champion; ^ – NCAA Division II playoff participant; Rankings from NCAA Division II Football Committee poll

1996 Lone Star Conference football standings
	Conf.			Overall
Team	W		L	W		L
No. 1 Texas A&M–Kingsville $^	7	–	0	8	–	3
No. 9 Central Oklahoma ^	5	–	2	9	–	3
Texas A&M–Commerce	4	–	3	7	–	3
Angelo State	4	–	3	6	–	4
Abilene Christian	4	–	3	6	–	4
Tarleton State	2	–	5	5	–	5
Eastern New Mexico	2	–	5	3	–	8
West Texas A&M	0	–	7	1	–	9
$ – Conference champion; ^ – NCAA Division II playoff participant; Rankings from NCAA Division II Football Committee poll

1996 Mid-America Intercollegiate Athletics Association football standings
	Conf.			Overall
Team	W		L	W		L
No. 2 Northwest Missouri State +^	8	–	1	11	–	2
No. 7 Pittsburg State +^	8	–	1	8	–	3
Truman State	7	–	2	7	–	4
Missouri Western State	5	–	4	7	–	4
Missouri Southern State	5	–	4	6	–	4
Emporia State	5	–	4	5	–	6
Washburn	4	–	5	4	–	6
Central Missouri State	2	–	7	4	–	7
Missouri–Rolla	1	–	8	3	–	8
Southwest Baptist	0	–	9	0	–	10
+ – Conference co-champions; ^ – NCAA Division II playoff participant; Rankings from NCAA Division II Football Committee poll

1996 Midwest Intercollegiate Football Conference standings
	Conf.			Overall
Team	W		L	W		L
No. 3 Ferris State $^	9	–	1	10	–	2
Grand Valley State	8	–	2	8	–	3
Northern Michigan	7	–	3	7	–	3
No. 20 Saginaw Valley State	7	–	3	7	–	3
Hillsdale	6	–	4	6	–	5
Northwood	5	–	5	6	–	5
Ashland	4	–	6	4	–	7
Indianapolis	3	–	7	4	–	7
St. Francis (IL)	2	–	8	3	–	8
Michigan Tech	2	–	8	2	–	8
Wayne State (MI)	2	–	8	2	–	9
$ – Conference champion; ^ – NCAA Division II playoff participant; Rankings from NCAA Division II Football Committee poll

1996 North Central Conference football standings
	Conf.			Overall
Team	W		L	W		L
No. T–4 Nebraska–Omaha $^	8	–	1	10	–	2
No. 15 Northern Colorado ^	6	–	3	12	–	3
No. 19 North Dakota	6	–	3	7	–	3
South Dakota State	6	–	3	7	–	4
North Dakota State	5	–	4	6	–	4
South Dakota	4	–	5	6	–	5
Mankato State	4	–	5	5	–	6
St. Cloud State	4	–	5	5	–	6
Augustana (SD)	2	–	7	3	–	8
Morningside	0	–	9	1	–	10
$ – Conference champion; ^ – NCAA Division II playoff participant; Rankings from NCAA Division II Football Committee poll

1996 Northern California Athletic Conference football standings
	Conf.			Overall
Team	W		L	W		L
Chico State $	3	–	1	5	–	5
Sonoma State	2	–	2	2	–	8
Humboldt State	1	–	3	3	–	7
$ – Conference champion

1996 Northern Sun Intercollegiate Conference football standings
	Conf.			Overall
Team	W		L	W		L
Minnesota Duluth $	6	–	0	8	–	3
Moorhead State	5	–	1	7	–	3
Northern State	4	–	2	7	–	4
Winona State	3	–	3	4	–	7
Southwest State (MN)	2	–	4	2	–	9
Bemidji State	1	–	5	2	–	8
Minnesota Morris	0	–	6	1	–	9
$ – Conference champion

1996 Pennsylvania State Athletic Conference football standings
	Conf.			Overall
Team	W		L	W		L
East Division
No. 13 Bloomsburg x^	6	–	0	10	–	2
West Chester	4	–	2	7	–	3
East Stroudsburg	4	–	2	6	–	4
Millersville	4	–	2	6	–	4
Kutztown	2	–	4	4	–	6
Mansfield	1	–	5	3	–	8
Cheyney	0	–	6	0	–	11
West Division
No. 8 Clarion x^	5	–	1	11	–	3
No. 10 IUP x^	5	–	1	8	–	3
Slippery Rock	4	–	2	7	–	4
Edinboro	4	–	2	6	–	4
Shippensburg	2	–	4	3	–	8
Lock Haven	1	–	5	1	–	10
California (PA)	0	–	6	2	–	9
x – Division champion/co-champions; ^ – NCAA Division II playoff participant; Rankings from NCAA Division II Football Committee poll

1996 Rocky Mountain Athletic Conference football standings
	Conf.			Overall
Team	W		L	W		L
No. 11 Chadron State $^	7	–	1	10	–	2
Western State (CO)	6	–	2	6	–	5
New Mexico Highlands	5	–	3	8	–	3
Fort Hays State	5	–	3	7	–	3
Fort Lewis	4	–	4	5	–	5
Nebraska–Kearney	4	–	4	4	–	7
Adams State	2	–	6	4	–	7
Mesa State	2	–	6	2	–	8
Colorado Mines	1	–	7	3	–	8
$ – Conference champion; ^ – NCAA Division II playoff participant; Rankings from NCAA Division II Football Committee poll

1996 South Atlantic Conference football standings
	Conf.			Overall
Team	W		L	W		L
No. 6 Carson–Newman +^	6	–	1	12	–	2
No. 18 Catawba +	6	–	1	9	–	2
Presbyterian	4	–	3	5	–	6
Elon	4	–	3	4	–	7
Mars Hill	3	–	4	5	–	5
Wingate	2	–	5	4	–	6
Gardner–Webb	2	–	5	2	–	9
Lenoir–Rhyne	1	–	6	1	–	9
Newberry	0	–	0	7	–	4
+ – Conference co-champions; ^ – NCAA Division II playoff participant; Rankings from NCAA Division II Football Committee poll

1996 Southern Intercollegiate Athletic Conference football standings
	Conf.			Overall
Team	W		L	W		L
No. 14 Albany State $^	5	–	1	8	–	3
Miles	3	–	3	6	–	4
Alabama A&M	3	–	3	6	–	5
Fort Valley State	3	–	3	6	–	5
Savannah State	3	–	3	6	–	5
Kentucky State	3	–	3	5	–	6
Clark Atlanta	3	–	3	5	–	6
Tuskegee	2	–	4	5	–	6
Morris Brown	2	–	4	3	–	8
Morehouse	0	–	6	2	–	9
$ – Conference champion; ^ – NCAA Division II playoff participant; Rankings from NCAA Division II Football Committee poll

1996 West Virginia Intercollegiate Athletic Conference football standings
	Conf.			Overall
Team	W		L	W		L
Glenville State +	6	–	1	6	–	4
Fairmont State +	6	–	1	6	–	4
Shepherd	5	–	2	7	–	3
West Virginia State	3	–	4	4	–	7
Concord	2	–	5	4	–	7
West Liberty State	2	–	5	2	–	8
West Virginia Wesleyan	2	–	5	2	–	8
West Virginia Tech	2	–	5	2	–	9
+ – Conference co-champions; West Virginia Wesleyan forfeited two victories including a conference win over West Virginia Tech.

1996 NCAA Division II independents football records
	Conf.			Overall
Team	W		L	W		L
Saint Joseph's (IN)		–		9	–	2
No. 17 UC Davis ^		–		8	–	5
Albany		–		7	–	3
New Haven		–		7	–	3
Southern Connecticut State		–		7	–	4
American International		–		6	–	4
Pace		–		6	–	4
Mercyhurst		–		4	–	5
Mississippi College		–		4	–	6
Western New Mexico		–		3	–	6
Wayne State (NE)		–		3	–	7
Kentucky Wesleyan		–		3	–	8
Gannon		–		2	–	8
Quincy		–		1	–	8
^ – NCAA Division II playoff participant; Rankings from NCAA Division II Football Committee poll

== Conference summaries ==
Conference Champions

Central Intercollegiate Athletic Association – Virginia State
Eastern Collegiate Football Conference – Salve Regina
Gulf South Conference – Valdosta State
Lone Star Conference – Texas A&M–Kingsville
Mid-America Intercollegiate Athletics Association – Northwest Missouri State and Pittsburg State
Midwest Intercollegiate Football Conference – Ferris State
North Central Conference – Nebraska–Omaha
Northern California Athletic Conference‡ – Cal State Chico
Northern Sun Intercollegiate Conference – Minnesota–Duluth
Pennsylvania State Athletic Conference – Bloomsburg (East), Clarion (West)
Rocky Mountain Athletic Conference – Chadron State
South Atlantic Conference – Carson-Newman and Catawba
Southern Intercollegiate Athletic Conference – Albany State
West Virginia Intercollegiate Athletic Conference – Fairmont State and Glenville State

== Postseason ==
1996 NCAA Division II Football Championship
- Teams: 16
- Finals Site: Braly Municipal Stadium; Florence, AL
- Champion: Northern Colorado; (1st title, title game)
- Runner-up: Carson–Newman; (1st title game)
- Semifinalists: Clarion; UC Davis
- Winning coach: championship

The 1996 NCAA Division II Football Championship playoffs were the 23rd single-elimination tournament to determine the national champion of men's NCAA Division II college football. The championship game was held at Braly Municipal Stadium in Florence, Alabama, for the tenth time.

=== Playoff bracket ===
First round Campus sites
Clarion	42
Bloomsburg	29
Ferris State	24
IUP	23
Northern Colorado	24
Pittsburg State	21
Northwest Missouri State	22
Nebraska–Omaha	21
Valdosta State	38
Albany State	28
Carson–Newman	41
West Georgia	7
Central Oklahoma	23
Chadron State	21
UC Davis	17
Texas A&M–Kingsville†	14

Quarterfinals; Campus sites
Clarion	23
Ferris State	21
Northern Colorado	27
Northwest Missouri State	26
Valdosta State	19
Carson–Newman	24
Central Oklahoma	7
UC Davis	26

Semifinals; Campus sites
Clarion	18
Northern Colorado	19
Carson–Newman	29
UC Davis	26

Championship; Braly Municipal Stadium; Florence, AL
Northern Colorado	23
Carson–Newman	14

== See also ==
- 1996 NCAA Division I-A football season
- 1996 NCAA Division I-AA football season
- 1996 NCAA Division III football season
- 1996 NAIA Division I football season
- 1996 NAIA Division II football season
