= 1996 Indiana State Sycamores football team =

American college football season

1996 Indiana State Sycamores football
- Conference: Gateway Football Conference
- Record: 6–5 (3–2 Gateway)
- Head coach: Dennis Raetz (17th season)
- Home stadium: Memorial Stadium

1996 Gateway Football Conference standings
	Conf.			Overall
Team	W		L	W		L
No. 3 Northern Iowa $^	5	–	0	12	–	2
No. 10 Western Illinois ^	3	–	2	9	–	3
No. 21 Southwest Missouri State	3	–	2	7	–	4
Indiana State	3	–	2	6	–	5
Southern Illinois	1	–	4	5	–	6
Illinois State	0	–	5	3	–	8
$ – Conference champion; ^ – NCAA Division I-AA playoff participant; Rankings from The Sports Network poll

The 1996 Indiana State Sycamores football team represented Indiana State University as a member of the Gateway Football Conference during the 1996 NCAA Division I-AA football season. Led by 17th-year coach Dennis Raetz, the Sycamores compiled an overall record of 6–5 with a mark of 3–2 in conference play, and finished tied for second in the Gateway. Indiana State played home games at Memorial Stadium in Terre Haute, Indiana.

== Schedule ==
Date	Opponent	Rank	Site	Result	Attendance	Source
August 29	Mars Hill*		Memorial Stadium; Terre Haute, IN	W 48–0		
September 7	at No. 21 (I-A) Kansas State*		KSU Stadium; Manhattan, KS	L 3–59	40,724	
September 14	at No. 17 Eastern Illinois*		O'Brien Field; Charleston, IL	L 16–35		
September 21	Saint Joseph's (IN)*		Memorial Stadium; Terre Haute, IN	W 47–14		
September 28	at Liberty*		Williams Stadium; Lynchburg, VA	W 34–10		
October 5	at No. 22 Western Illinois		Hanson Field; Macomb, IL	W 10–7		
October 12	at Southern Illinois		McAndrew Stadium; Carbondale, IL	W 24–13	10,300	
October 19	Illinois State	No. 23	Memorial Stadium; Terre Haute, IN	W 23–7	7,049	
October 26	at Western Kentucky*	No. 21	L. T. Smith Stadium; Bowling Green, KY	L 20–27	8,200	
November 9	No. 3 Northern Iowa	No. 21	Memorial Stadium; Terre Haute, IN	L 19–34		
November 16	No. 20 Southwest Missouri State		Memorial Stadium; Terre Haute, IN	L 12–27		
*Non-conference game; Rankings from The Sports Network Poll released prior to the game
