= Cliff Hysell =

American football player and coach (1942–2014)

Biographical details
- Born: April 7, 1942; Helena, Montana, U.S.
- Died: October 26, 2014 (aged 72); Bozeman, Montana, U.S.

Playing career
- 1961–1962: Utah
- 1964–1965: Montana State

Coaching career (HC unless noted)
- 1966–1971: Great Falls HS (MT)
- 1972–1981: Montana State (assistant)
- 1982–1991: Fresno State (assistant)
- 1992–1999: Montana State

Head coaching record
- Overall: 42–46 (college)

Cliff Hysell (April 7, 1942 – October 26, 2014) was an American football player and coach. He served as the head football coach at Montana State University from 1992 to 1999, compiling a record of 42–46. Hysell died at the age of 72 at his home in Bozeman, Montana on October 26, 2014.

== Head coaching record ==
=== College ===
Year	Team	Overall	Conference	Standing	Bowl/playoffs	TSN^{#}
Montana State Bobcats (Big Sky Conference) (1992–1999)
1992	Montana State	4–7	2–5	T–6th		
1993	Montana State	7–4	4–3	4th		
1994	Montana State	3–8	0–7	8th		
1995	Montana State	5–6	2–5	7th		
1996	Montana State	6–5	4–4	T–5th		
1997	Montana State	6–5	5–3	3rd		
1998	Montana State	7–4	5–3	T–2nd		25
1999	Montana State	4–7	2–6	T–7th		
Montana State:		42–46	24–36			
Total:		42–46				
