= 1996 Delaware State Hornets football team =

American college football season

1996 Delaware State Hornets football
- Conference: Mid-Eastern Athletic Conference
- Record: 3–8 (2–5 MEAC)
- Head coach: Bill Collick (12th season)
- Home stadium: Alumni Stadium

1996 Mid-Eastern Athletic Conference football standings
	Conf.			Overall
Team	W		L	W		L
No. 12 Florida A&M $^	7	–	0	9	–	3
No. 20 Howard	6	–	1	10	–	2
North Carolina A&T	4	–	3	8	–	3
South Carolina State	4	–	3	4	–	6
Hampton	3	–	4	5	–	6
Morgan State	2	–	5	4	–	7
Delaware State	2	–	5	3	–	8
Bethune–Cookman	0	–	7	2	–	9
$ – Conference champion; ^ – NCAA Division I-AA playoff participant; Rankings from The Sports Network poll

The 1996 Delaware State Hornets football team represented Delaware State University as a member of the Mid-Eastern Athletic Conference (MEAC) during the 1996 NCAA Division I-AA football season. Led by 12th-year head coach Bill Collick, the Hornets compiled an overall record of 3–8, with a mark of 2–5 in conference play, and finished tied for sixth in the MEAC.

== Schedule ==
Date	Opponent	Site	Result	Attendance	Source
September 7	Lock Haven*	Alumni Stadium; Dover, DE	W 66–19		
September 14	at Liberty*	Williams Stadium; Lynchburg, VA	L 7–27		
September 21	vs. North Carolina Central*	Boardwalk Hall; Atlantic City, NJ (Approaching Storm Classic)	L 16–21	4,900	
September 28	at Norfolk State*	Foreman Field; Norfolk, VA	L 23–27	11,801	
October 5	at Bethune–Cookman	Municipal Stadium; Daytona Beach, FL	W 34–12		
October 12	Hampton	Alumni Stadium; Dover, DE	L 7–37	3,600	
October 19	No. 15 Florida A&M	Alumni Stadium; Dover, DE	L 26–47		
October 26	at Morgan State	Hughes Stadium; Baltimore, MD	W 35–14	7,686	
November 2	South Carolina State	Alumni Stadium; Dover, DE	L 14–34		
November 9	North Carolina A&T	Alumni Stadium; Dover, DE	L 6–31		
November 23	at No. 21 Howard	William H. Greene Stadium; Washington, DC	L 23–48		
*Non-conference game; Rankings from The Sports Network Poll released prior to the game
