= 1996 Buffalo Bulls football team =

American college football season

1996 Buffalo Bulls football
- Conference: Independent
- Record: 8–3
- Head coach: Craig Cirbus (2nd season)
- Captains: Mike Chichester; Craig Guest; Mark Taylor; Todd Pace; Mike Schleelein; John Sandusky
- Home stadium: University at Buffalo Stadium

1996 NCAA Division I-AA independents football standings
	Conf.			Overall
Team	W		L	W		L
Buffalo		–		8	–	3
No. 15 Youngstown State		–		8	–	3
Saint Mary's		–		7	–	3
Western Kentucky		–		7	–	4
Davidson		–		6	–	4
Towson		–		6	–	4
Samford		–		6	–	5
Wofford		–		6	–	5
Cal Poly		–		5	–	6
Hofstra		–		5	–	6
Liberty		–		5	–	6
Southern Utah		–		4	–	7
Charleston Southern		–		2	–	8
Morehead State		–		2	–	8
Jacksonville State		–		1	–	9
^ – NCAA Division I-AA playoff participant; Rankings from The Sports Network poll

The 1996 Buffalo Bulls football team represented the University at Buffalo as an independent during the 1996 NCAA Division I-AA football season. Led by second-year head coach Craig Cirbus, the Bulls compiled a record of 8–3. The team played home games at the University at Buffalo Stadium in Amherst, New York.

== Schedule ==
Date	Time	Opponent	Site	TV	Result	Attendance	Source
August 29	7:00 pm	Illinois State	University at Buffalo Stadium; Amherst, NY		W 41–35	8,291	
September 7	7:00 pm	Connecticut	University at Buffalo Stadium; Amherst, NY		L 3–20	4,509	
September 14	12:00 pm	at Colgate	Andy Kerr Stadium; Hamilton, NY	ESN	W 36–16	3,000	
September 21	1:00 pm	at Lehigh	Goodman Stadium; Bethlehem, PA		W 34–20	8,227	
September 28	7:00 pm	Edinboro	University at Buffalo Stadium; Amherst, NY		W 17–7	4,517	
October 5	12:00 pm	Cornell^{†}	University at Buffalo Stadium; Amherst, NY	ESN	W 41–24	9,177	
October 12	1:30 pm	Youngstown State	University at Buffalo Stadium; Amherst, NY		L 6–17	5,149	
October 19	1:00 pm	at UMass	Warren McGuirk Alumni Stadium; Hadley, MA (rivalry)		L 20–41	8,819	
November 2	1:00 pm	at Hofstra	Hofstra Stadium; Hempstead, NY		W 14–10		
November 9	1:30 pm	New Haven	University at Buffalo Stadium; Amherst, NY		W 24–20	3,404	
November 16	1:30 pm	at Maine	Alumni Field; Orono, ME		W 35–31	3,107	
^{†}Homecoming; All times are in Eastern time

== After the season ==
=== NFL draft ===
The following Bull was selected in the 1997 NFL draft following the season.

Round	Pick	Player	Position	NFL club
4	125	Ed Ellis	Tackle	New England Patriots
