= 1996 North Carolina A&T Aggies football team =

American college football season

1996 North Carolina A&T Aggies football
- Conference: Mid-Eastern Athletic Conference
- Record: 8–3 (4–3 MEAC)
- Head coach: Bill Hayes (9th season)
- Home stadium: Aggie Stadium

1996 Mid-Eastern Athletic Conference football standings
	Conf.			Overall
Team	W		L	W		L
No. 12 Florida A&M $^	7	–	0	9	–	3
No. 20 Howard	6	–	1	10	–	2
North Carolina A&T	4	–	3	8	–	3
South Carolina State	4	–	3	4	–	6
Hampton	3	–	4	5	–	6
Morgan State	2	–	5	4	–	7
Delaware State	2	–	5	3	–	8
Bethune–Cookman	0	–	7	2	–	9
$ – Conference champion; ^ – NCAA Division I-AA playoff participant; Rankings from The Sports Network poll

The 1996 North Carolina A&T Aggies football team represented North Carolina A&T State University as a member of the Mid-Eastern Athletic Conference (MEAC) during the 1996 NCAA Division I-AA football season. Led by ninth-year head coach Bill Hayes, the Aggies compiled an overall record of 8–3, with a mark of 4–3 in conference play, and finished tied for third in the MEAC.

== Schedule ==
Date	Opponent	Site	Result	Attendance	Source
August 31	vs. North Carolina Central*	Carter–Finley Stadium; Raleigh, NC (rivalry)	W 38–31 ^{OT}	47,263	
September 7	Winston–Salem State*	Aggie Stadium; Greensboro, NC (rivalry)	W 31–7	15,594	
September 14	Fayetteville State*	Aggie Stadium; Greensboro, NC	W 17–7	10,252	
September 21	at Hampton	Armstrong Stadium; Hampton, VA	W 24–20	10,961	
October 12	at No. 16 Florida A&M	Bragg Memorial Stadium; Tallahassee, FL	L 23–24		
October 19	Morgan State	Aggie Stadium; Greensboro, NC	W 55–7		
October 26	at Howard	RFK Stadium; Washington, DC	L 3–38	21,357	
November 2	Bethune–Cookman	Aggie Stadium; Greensboro, NC	W 73–7		
November 9	at Delaware State	Alumni Stadium; Dover, DE	W 31–6		
November 16	Grambling State*	Aggie Stadium; Greensboro, NC	W 17–12	9,770	
November 23	vs. South Carolina State	American Legion Memorial Stadium; Charlotte, NC (Carolinas Classic, rivalry)	L 0–35	21,282	
*Non-conference game; Rankings from The Sports Network Poll released prior to the game
