= 1996 Northern Iowa Panthers football team =

American college football season

1996 Northern Iowa Panthers football

Gateway champion

NCAA Division I-AA Semifinal, L 14–31 vs. Marshall
- Conference: Gateway Football Conference

Ranking
- Sports Network: No. 3
- Record: 12–2 (5–0 Gateway)
- Head coach: Terry Allen (8th season)
- Home stadium: UNI-Dome

1996 Gateway Football Conference standings
	Conf.			Overall
Team	W		L	W		L
No. 3 Northern Iowa $^	5	–	0	12	–	2
No. 10 Western Illinois ^	3	–	2	9	–	3
No. 21 Southwest Missouri State	3	–	2	7	–	4
Indiana State	3	–	2	6	–	5
Southern Illinois	1	–	4	5	–	6
Illinois State	0	–	5	3	–	8
$ – Conference champion; ^ – NCAA Division I-AA playoff participant; Rankings from The Sports Network poll

The 1996 Northern Iowa Panthers football team was an American football team that represented the University of Northern Iowa as a member of the Gateway Football Conference (Gateway Conference) during the 1996 NCAA Division I-AA football season. In its eighth and final year under head coach Terry Allen, the team compiled a 12–2 record (5–0 in conference games), outscored opponents by a total of 457 to 255, and won the Gateway Conference championship, winning at least a share of the championship for the seventh consecutive year. Northern Iowa advanced to the NCAA Division I-AA playoffs, where the Panthers defeated Eastern Illinois in the first round and William & Mary in the quarterfinals before losing to the eventual national champiom, Marshall, in the semifinals. Terry Allen was named the AFCA coach of the year for Region 4.

Wide receiver Dedric Ward set a school single-season record with 1,556 receiving yards, was selected as the Gateway Conference offensive player of the year, and received All-America honors from the Associated Press, the American Football Coaches Association, American Football Quarterly, Football Gazette, and the Walter Camp Football Foundation. Six Northern Iowa players received first-team honors on the 1996 all-Gateway Conference football team: Ward; quarterback Steve Beard; wide receiver Alonzo Clayton; linebacker Tim Miller; offensive lineman Andy Pattee; and defensive back Tyree Talton. Seven others were named to the second team. Beard completed 197 of 360 passes for 3,433 yards (245.2 yards per game) and 26 touchdowns. Talton set a school record with a 97-yard kickoff return, and Clayton set a school record with a 58-yard punt return against Marshall. Running back Jeff Stovall led the team with 1,513 rushing yards. Talton tallied 927 kick return yards, 9 pass breakups and 9 interceptions.

The team played its home games at the UNI-Dome in Cedar Falls, Iowa.

== Schedule ==
Date	Opponent	Rank	Site	Result	Attendance	Source
August 31	at Southern Utah*	No. 7	Coliseum of Southern Utah; Cedar City, UT	W 31–21		
September 7	St. Cloud State*	No. 6	UNI-Dome; Cedar Falls, IA	W 44–7		
September 14	No. 3 Stephen F. Austin*	No. 5	UNI-Dome; Cedar Falls, IA	W 38–12	11,078	
September 21	at Iowa State*	No. 3	Cyclone Stadium; Ames, IA	L 23–42	40,122	
September 28	McNeese State*	No. 5	UNI-Dome; Cedar Falls, IA	W 43–10	14,692	
October 12	Illinois State	No. 3	UNI-Dome; Cedar Falls, IA	W 47–10	14,522	
October 19	No. 5 Southwest Missouri State	No. 3	UNI-Dome; Cedar Falls, IA	W 38–31	14,727	
October 26	at Southern Illinois	No. 3	McAndrew Stadium; Carbondale, IL	W 33–7	2,400	
November 2	at No. 21 Youngstown State*	No. 3	Stambaugh Stadium; Youngstown, OH	W 23–10	12,507	
November 9	at No. 21 Indiana State	No. 3	Memorial Stadium; Terre Haute, IN	W 34–19		
November 16	No. 8 Western Illinois	No. 3	UNI-Dome; Cedar Falls, IA	W 30–6	15,476	
November 30	No. 16 Eastern Illinois*	No. 3	UNI-Dome; Cedar Falls, IA (NCAA Division I-AA First Round)	W 21–14		
December 7	No. 7 William & Mary*	No. 3	UNI-Dome; Cedar Falls, IA (NCAA Division I-AA Quarterfinal)	W 38–35	10,796	
December 14	at No. 1 Marshall*	No. 3	Marshall University Stadium; Huntington, WV (NCAA Division I-AA Semifinal)	L 14–31	14,414	
*Non-conference game; Rankings from The Sports Network Poll released prior to the game
