= 1996 Idaho State Bengals football team =

American college football season

1996 Idaho State Bengals football
- Conference: Big Sky Conference
- Record: 4–7 (1–6 Big Sky)
- Head coach: Brian McNeely (5th season)
- Home stadium: Holt Arena

1996 Big Sky Conference football standings
	Conf.			Overall
Team	W		L	W		L
No. 2 Montana $^	7	–	0	14	–	1
No. 6 Northern Arizona ^	6	–	1	9	–	3
Cal State Northridge	4	–	3	7	–	4
Weber State	4	–	3	7	–	4
Eastern Washington	3	–	4	6	–	5
Montana State	3	–	4	6	–	5
Idaho State	1	–	6	4	–	7
Sacramento State	0	–	7	1	–	10
Portland State	0	–	0	3	–	8
$ – Conference champion; ^ – NCAA Division I-AA playoff participant; Portland State games did not count in conference standings; Rankings from The Sports Network poll

The 1996 Idaho State Bengals football team represented Idaho State University as a member of the Big Sky Conference during the 1996 NCAA Division I-AA football season. Led by fifth-year head coach Brian McNeely, the Bengals compiled an overall record of 4–7, with a mark of 1–6 in conference play, and finished seventh in the Big Sky.

== Schedule ==
Date	Time	Opponent	Rank	Site	Result	Attendance	Source
August 31	6:00 p.m.	at Ole Miss*	No. 17	Vaught–Hemingway Stadium; Oxford, MS	L 14–38	28,140	
September 7		Cal Poly*	No. 20	Holt Arena; Pocatello, ID	W 35–32 ^{OT}		
September 21		Montana Western*	No. 19	Holt Arena; Pocatello, ID	W 47–0	6,713	
September 28		at Montana State	No. 17	Reno H. Sales Stadium; Bozeman, MT	L 13–17	9,607	
October 5		Sacramento State	No. 24	Holt Arena; Pocatello, ID	W 44–14	6,130	
October 12	1:05 p.m.	at No. 2 Montana	No. 23	Washington–Grizzly Stadium; Missoula, MT	L 19–43	18,868	
October 26		at No. 22 Eastern Washington	No. 25	Holt Arena; Pocatello, ID	L 17–31		
November 2		at No. 8 Northern Arizona		Walkup Skydome; Flagstaff, AZ	L 38–50 ^{OT}	9,689	
November 9		Cal State Northridge		Holt Arena; Pocatello, ID	L 40–42	6,006	
November 16		at Portland State		Civic Stadium; Portland, OR	W 31–12	7,105	
November 23		Weber State		Holt Arena; Pocatello, ID	L 22–37	5,011	
*Non-conference game; Rankings from The Sports Network Poll released prior to the game
