= 1996 Liberty Flames football team =

American college football season

1996 Liberty Flames football
- Conference: Independent
- Record: 5–6
- Head coach: Sam Rutigliano (8th season)
- Offensive coordinator: Bob Leahy (8th season)
- Defensive coordinator: George MacIntyre (2nd season)
- Home stadium: Williams Stadium

1996 NCAA Division I-AA independents football standings
	Conf.			Overall
Team	W		L	W		L
Buffalo		–		8	–	3
No. 15 Youngstown State		–		8	–	3
Saint Mary's		–		7	–	3
Western Kentucky		–		7	–	4
Davidson		–		6	–	4
Towson		–		6	–	4
Samford		–		6	–	5
Wofford		–		6	–	5
Cal Poly		–		5	–	6
Hofstra		–		5	–	6
Liberty		–		5	–	6
Southern Utah		–		4	–	7
Charleston Southern		–		2	–	8
Morehead State		–		2	–	8
Jacksonville State		–		1	–	9
^ – NCAA Division I-AA playoff participant; Rankings from The Sports Network poll

The 1996 Liberty Flames football team represented Liberty University as an independent during the 1996 NCAA Division I-AA football season. Led by eighth-year head coach Sam Rutigliano, the Flames compiled an overall record of 5–6.

== Schedule ==
Date	Opponent	Rank	Site	Result	Attendance	Source
August 29	at East Tennessee State	No. 14	Memorial Center; Johnson City, TN	L 20–24		
September 7	Western Carolina	No. 17	Williams Stadium; Lynchburg, VA	L 10–20	10,037	
September 14	Delaware State		Williams Stadium; Lynchburg, VA	W 27–7		
September 21	at Morgan State		Hughes Stadium; Baltimore, MD	L 28–34 ^{OT}	1,558	
September 28	Indiana State		Williams Stadium; Lynchburg, VA	L 10–34		
October 12	Hofstra		Williams Stadium; Lynchburg, VA	L 20–29		
October 19	at Western Kentucky		L. T. Smith Stadium; Bowling Green, KY	W 23–14	7,100	
October 26	Charleston Southern		Williams Stadium; Lynchburg, VA	W 38–7	8,527	
November 2	at Hampton		Armstrong Stadium; Hampton, VA	W 34–30	2,059	
November 9	Livingstone		Williams Stadium; Lynchburg, VA	W 27–17		
November 16	at Georgia Southern		Paulson Stadium; Statesboro, GA	L 14–45	10,959	
Rankings from NCAA Division I-AA Football Committee Poll released prior to the game
