= 1996 Charleston Southern Buccaneers football team =

American college football season

1996 Charleston Southern Buccaneers football
- Conference: Independent
- Record: 2–8
- Head coach: David Dowd (6th season)
- Home stadium: Buccaneer Field

1996 NCAA Division I-AA independents football standings
	Conf.			Overall
Team	W		L	W		L
Buffalo		–		8	–	3
No. 15 Youngstown State		–		8	–	3
Saint Mary's		–		7	–	3
Western Kentucky		–		7	–	4
Davidson		–		6	–	4
Towson		–		6	–	4
Samford		–		6	–	5
Wofford		–		6	–	5
Cal Poly		–		5	–	6
Hofstra		–		5	–	6
Liberty		–		5	–	6
Southern Utah		–		4	–	7
Charleston Southern		–		2	–	8
Morehead State		–		2	–	8
Jacksonville State		–		1	–	9
^ – NCAA Division I-AA playoff participant; Rankings from The Sports Network poll

The 1996 Charleston Southern Buccaneers football team represented Charleston Southern University as an independent during the 1996 NCAA Division I-AA football season. Led by sixth-year head coach David Dowd, the Buccaneers compiled a record of 2–8. Charleston Southern played home games at Buccaneer Field in North Charleston, South Carolina.

== Schedule ==
Date	Time	Opponent	Site	Result	Attendance	Source
September 7		South Carolina State	Buccaneer Field; North Charleston, SC	Canceled (Note: The game against South Carolina State scheduled for September 7 was canceled due to the impacts of Hurricane Fran.)		
September 14		at Presbyterian	Bailey Stadium; Clinton, SC	L 26–34		
September 21		West Virginia State	Buccaneer Field; North Charleston, SC	W 17–12		
September 28		Hofstra	Buccaneer Field; North Charleston, SC	L 0–45		
October 5		Morehead State	Buccaneer Field; North Charleston, SC	L 27–30		
October 12		Newberry	Buccaneer Field; North Charleston, SC	L 6–35		
October 26		at Liberty	Williams Stadium; Lynchburg, VA	L 7–38	8,527	
November 2		New Haven	Buccaneer Field; North Charleston, SC	L 7–48		
November 9	7:00 p.m.	Tusculum	Buccaneer Field; North Charleston, SC	W 46–23	3,200	
November 16		at Wofford	Gibbs Stadium; Spartanburg, SC	L 15–43		
November 21	7:30 p.m.	at UAB	Legion Field; Birmingham, AL	L 13–49	6,500	
All times are in Eastern time
