= 1996 NCAA Division II football rankings =

The 1996 NCAA Division II football rankings are from the NCAA Division II football committee. This is for the 1996 season.

== Legend ==
| | Increase in ranking |
| | Decrease in ranking |
| | Not ranked previous week |
| (#–#) | Win–loss record |
| (Italics) | Number of first place votes |
| т | Tied with team above or below also with this symbol |

== NCAA Division II Football Committee poll ==
| | Preseason | Week 1 Sept 10 | Week 2 Sept 17 | Week 3 Sept 24 | Week 4 Oct 1 | Week 5 Oct 8 | Week 6 Oct 15 | Week 7 Oct 22 | Week 8 Oct 29 | Week 9 Nov 5 | Week 10 Nov 12 | |
|---|---|---|---|---|---|---|---|---|---|---|---|---|
| 1. | North Alabama (3) | Ferris State (2–0) (3) | Ferris State (3–0) (2) | North Dakota State (2–0) (3) | Carson–Newman (4–0) (4) | IUP (4–0) (4) | IUP (5–0) (4) | Valdosta State (7–0) (4) | Valdosta State (8–0) (4) | Texas A&M–Kingsville (6–2) (3) | Texas A&M–Kingsville (7–2) (4) | 1. |
| 2. | Pittsburg State (1) | North Dakota State (1–0) | North Dakota State (1–0) (1) | Carson–Newman (3–0) (1) | IUP (3–0) | Central Oklahoma (4–0) | Central Oklahoma (5–0) | Saginaw Valley State (6–0) | Texas A&M–Kingsville (5–2) | Northwest Missouri State (9–0) (1) | Northwest Missouri State (10–0) | 2. |
| 3. | Texas A&M–Kingsville | Carson–Newman (1–0) (1) | Carson–Newman (2–0) (1) | IUP (2–0) | Central Oklahoma (3–0) | Missouri Southern State (4–0) | Missouri Southern State (5–0) | Texas A&M–Kingsville (4–2) | Northwest Missouri State (8–0) | Ferris State (8–1) | Ferris State (9–1) | 3. |
| 4. | Ferris State | Texas A&M–Commerce (1–0) | Texas A&M–Commerce (2–0) | North Alabama (3–1) | Missouri Southern State (3–0) | Valdosta State (5–0) | Valdosta State (6–0) | Northwest Missouri State (6–0) | Ferris State (7–1) | Nebraska–Omaha (8–1) | Nebraska–Omaha (9–1) т | 4. |
| 5. | North Dakota State | Virginia State (2–0) | North Dakota (1–0) | Northern Colorado (3–0) | Valdosta State (4–0) | Pittsburg State (3–1) | Saginaw Valley State (5–0) | North Carolina Central (7–1) | Nebraska–Omaha (7–1) | Valdosta State (8–1) | Valdosta State (9–1) т | 5. |
| 6. | Carson–Newman | North Dakota (0–0) | Fort Hays State (2–0) | Central Oklahoma (2–0) | Texas A&M–Commerce (3–1) | Saginaw Valley State (4–0) | North Carolina Central (6–1) | West Georgia (6–1) | Carson–Newman (7–1) | Carson–Newman (8–1) | Carson–Newman (9–1) | 6. |
| 7. | New Haven | Fort Hays State (1–0) | North Alabama (2–1) | Pittsburg State (1–1) | Saginaw Valley State (3–0) | South Dakota (5–0) | Texas A&M–Kingsville (3–2) | Ferris State (7–1) | IUP (6–1) | Clarion (8–1) | Pittsburg State (7–2) | 7. |
| 8. | Fort Hays State | Edinboro (1–0) | West Chester (3–0) | Texas A&M–Commerce (2–1) | South Dakota (4–0) | Texas A&M–Kingsville (2–2) | Northwest Missouri State (6–0) | Nebraska–Omaha (6–1) | Chadron State (8–0) | Pittsburg State (6–2) | Clarion (8–2) | 8. |
| 9. | North Dakota | North Alabama (1–1) | Texas A&M–Kingsville (1–1) | Valdosta State (4–0) | Pittsburg State (2–1) | North Carolina Central (5–1) | West Georgia (6–1) | Carson–Newman (6–1) | Catawba (7–1) | Central Oklahoma (6–2) | Central Oklahoma (7–2) | 9. |
| 10. | Virginia State | Texas A&M–Kingsville (0–1) | Pittsburg State (0–1) | Saginaw Valley State (3–0) | West Chester (3–1) | West Chester (4–1) | Carson–Newman (5–1) | Chadron State (7–0) | Clarion (7–1) | IUP (6–2) | IUP (7–2) | 10. |
| 11. | Texas A&M–Commerce (Note: In the actual printed preseason poll, Texas A&M–Commerce was listed as East Texas State) | Pittsburg State (0–1) | Northern Colorado (2–0) | West Chester (3–1) | Texas A&M–Kingsville (1–2) | West Georgia (5–1) | Angelo State (4–1) | IUP (5–1) | South Dakota (6–2) | Chadron State (8–1) т | Chadron State (9–1) | 11. |
| 12. | Bloomsburg | Bloomsburg (1–0) | IUP (2–0) (Note: In the actual printed polls, IUP was listed as Indiana (PA)) | Texas A&M–Kingsville (1–2) | North Carolina Central (4–1) | Carson–Newman (4–1) | Ferris State (5–1) | Missouri Southern State (5–1) | UC Davis (4–3) | West Georgia (7–2) т | West Georgia (8–2) | 12. |
| 13. | Albany State | Northern Colorado (1–0) | Valdosta State (3–0) | West Georgia (4–0) | North Dakota State (2–1) | Angelo State (3–1) | Nebraska–Omaha (5–1) | Central Oklahoma (5–1) | Saginaw Valley State (6–1) | West Chester (6–2) | Bloomsburg (9–1) | 13. |
| 14. | Northern Colorado | Angelo State (2–0) | Angelo State (2–0) | Missouri Southern State (2–0) т | West Georgia (4–1) | Catawba (5–0) | South Dakota State (5–1) | South Dakota (6–1) | Angelo State (5–2) | Livingstone (8–1) | Albany State (8–2) | 14. |
| 15. | Edinboro | Valdosta State (2–0) | Virginia State (2–1) | Northern Michigan (2–0) т | Ferris State (4–1) | Ferris State (5–1) | Grand Valley State (5–2) | Catawba (6–1) | North Alabama (5–3) т | South Dakota State (6–3) | Northern Colorado (7–3) | 15. |
| 16. | UC Davis (Note: In one of the weekly printed polls, UC Davis was listed as Cal-Davis) | UC Davis (0–0) т | Northern Michigan (2–0) | Angelo State (2–1) | Angelo State (2–1) | Northwest Missouri State (5–0) | Chadron State (6–0) | Clarion (6–1) | Pittsburg State (5–2) т | Texas A&M–Commerce (6–3) | Angelo State (6–3) | 16. |
| 17. | Angelo State | West Chester (2–0) т | Central Oklahoma (2–0) | Adams State (3–0) | Northern Michigan (2–1) | UC Davis (2–2) | Catawba (5–1) | UC Davis (3–3) | North Carolina Central (7–2) | UC Davis (4–4) т | UC Davis (5–4) | 17. |
| 18. | Millersville | Millersville (0–0) т | Missouri Southern State (1–0) | Ferris State (3–1) | Catawba (4–0) | Northern Michigan (3–1) | South Dakota (5–1) | South Dakota State (5–2) | West Chester (5–2) | Northern Colorado (6–3) т | Catawba (8–2) | 18. |
| 19. | Missouri Southern State | Missouri Southern State (0–0) т | West Georgia (3–0) | South Dakota (3–0) | Northwest Missouri State (4–0) | Northern Colorado (4–1) | Clarion (5–1) | Angelo State (4–2) т | Missouri Southern State (5–2) | Bloomsburg (8–1) | North Dakota (6–3) | 19. |
| 20. | Henderson State | Albany State (1–1) | Saginaw Valley State (2–0) | North Carolina Central (3–1) | UC Davis (1–2) | North Alabama (3–3) | Northern Colorado (5–1) | West Chester (4–2) т | Central Oklahoma (5–2) | Albany State (6–2) | Saginaw Valley State (7–2) | 20. |
| | Preseason | Week 1 Sept 10 | Week 2 Sept 17 | Week 3 Sept 24 | Week 4 Oct 1 | Week 5 Oct 8 | Week 6 Oct 15 | Week 7 Oct 22 | Week 8 Oct 29 | Week 9 Nov 5 | Week 10 Nov 12 | |
| | | Dropped: 7 New Haven; 20 Henderson State | Dropped: 8 Edinboro; 12 Bloomsburg; 16 UC Davis; 18 Millersville; 20 Albany State | Dropped: 5 North Dakota; 6 Fort Hays State; 15 Virginia State | Dropped: 4 North Alabama; 5 Northern Colorado; 17 Adams State | Dropped: 6 Texas A&M–Commerce; 13 North Dakota State | Dropped: 5 Pittsburg State; 10 West Chester; 17 UC Davis; 18 Northern Michigan; 20 North Alabama | Dropped: 15 Grand Valley State; 20 Northern Colorado | Dropped: 6 West Georgia; 18 South Dakota State | Dropped: 9 Catawba; 11 South Dakota; 13 Saginaw Valley State; 14 Angelo State; 15 North Alabama; 17 North Carolina Central; 19 Missouri Southern State | Dropped: 13 West Chester; 14 Livingstone; 15 South Dakota State; 16 Texas A&M–Commerce | |
