= 1996 Notre Dame Fighting Irish football team =

American college football season

1996 Notre Dame Fighting Irish football
- Conference: Independent

Ranking
- Coaches: No. 21
- AP: No. 19
- Record: 8–3
- Head coach: Lou Holtz (11th season)
- Offensive coordinator: Dave Roberts (3rd season)
- Offensive scheme: Multiple I formation
- Defensive coordinator: Bob Davie (3rd season)
- Base defense: 4–3
- MVP: Renaldo Wynn
- Captains: Lyron Cobbins; Marc Edwards; Ron Powlus
- Home stadium: Notre Dame Stadium

1996 NCAA Division I-A independents football records
	Conf.			Overall
Team	W		L	W		L
No. 25 Army		–		10	–	2
Navy		–		9	–	3
No. 19 Notre Dame		–		8	–	3
East Carolina		–		8	–	3
Louisiana Tech		–		6	–	5
UAB		–		5	–	6
UCF		–		5	–	6
Southwestern Louisiana		–		5	–	6
Northeast Louisiana		–		5	–	6
Arkansas State		–		4	–	7
Northern Illinois		–		1	–	10
Rankings from AP Poll

The 1996 Notre Dame Fighting Irish football team was an American football team that represented the University of Notre Dame as an independent during the 1996 NCAA Division I-A football season. In their eleventh and final year under head coach Lou Holtz, the Irish compiled an 8–3 record, outscored opponents by a total of 407 to 181, and were ranked No. 19 in the final AP poll and No. 21 in the final UPI poll. They defeated No. 6 Texas and No. 16 Washington, but lost to No. 4 Ohio State and unranked Pitt (overtime) and USC (overtime). They did not play in a bowl game, turning down an invitation to play Auburn in the Independence Bowl.

No Notre Dame players received first-team honors on the 1996 All-America college football team. Defensive end Renaldo Wynn was selected as the team's most valuable player. The team's statistical leaders included quarterback Ron Powlus (1,942 passing yards), Autry Denson (1,179 rushing yards, 66 points scored), wide receiver Malcolm Johnson (449 receiving yards), tight end Pete Chryplewicz (27 receptions), and linebacker Kinnon Tatum (77 tackles).

The team played its home games at Notre Dame Stadium in Notre Dame, Indiana.

== Schedule ==
Date	Time	Opponent	Rank	Site	TV	Result	Attendance	Source
September 5	8:00 p.m.	at Vanderbilt	No. 6	Vanderbilt Stadium; Nashville, TN	ESPN	W 14–7	41,523	
September 14	2:30 p.m.	Purdue	No. 9	Notre Dame Stadium; Notre Dame, IN (rivalry)	NBC	W 35–0	59,075	
September 21	12:00 p.m.	at No. 6 Texas	No. 9	Darrell K Royal–Texas Memorial Stadium; Austin, TX	ABC	W 27–24	83,312	
September 28	2:30 p.m.	No. 4 Ohio State	No. 5	Notre Dame Stadium; Notre Dame, IN	NBC	L 16–29	59,075	
October 12	2:30 p.m.	No. 16 Washington	No. 11	Notre Dame Stadium; Notre Dame, IN	NBC	W 54–20	59,075	
October 19	2:30 p.m.	Air Force	No. 8	Notre Dame Stadium; Notre Dame, IN (rivalry)	NBC	L 17–20 ^{OT}	59,075	
November 2	8:00 a.m.	at Navy	No. 19	Croke Park; Dublin, Ireland (Emerald Isle Classic, rivalry)	CBS	W 54–27	38,651	
November 9	3:30 p.m.	at Boston College	No. 17	Alumni Stadium; Chestnut Hill, MA (Holy War)	CBS	W 48–21	44,500	
November 16	1:30 p.m.	Pittsburgh	No. 14	Notre Dame Stadium; Notre Dame, IN (rivalry)	NBC	W 60–6	59,075	
November 23	1:30 p.m.	Rutgers	No. 10	Notre Dame Stadium; Notre Dame, IN	NBC	W 62–0	59,075	
November 30	8:00 p.m.	at USC	No. 10	Los Angeles Memorial Coliseum; Los Angeles, CA (rivalry)	ABC	L 20–27 ^{OT}	90,296	
Rankings from AP Poll released prior to the game; All times are in Eastern time

== Game summaries ==
=== Navy ===
Notre Dame participated in the Emerald Isle Classic, billed as the Shamrock Classic that year. The game was played in Dublin on November 2 at Croke Park, where Notre Dame beat Navy by a score of 54–27.

=== USC ===
#10 Notre Dame Fighting Irish (8–2) at USC Trojans (5–6)

Quarter	1	2	3	4	OT	Total
Notre Dame	0	7	7	6	0	20
USC	6	0	0	14	7	27

at Los Angeles Memorial Coliseum • Los Angeles, California

- Date: November 30
- Game attendance: 90,296
- TV announcers (ABC): Brent Musburger and Dick Vermeil
- USA Today

Game information

Notre Dame

- Ron Powlus
  8/19, 108 Yds, TD
- Autry Denson
  33 Rush, 160 Yds, TD
- Emmett Mosley
  3 Rec, 29 Yds

USC

- Brad Otton
  13/25, 183 Yds, 2 TD
- Delon Washington
  15 Rush, 67 Yds, TD
- Chris Miller
  4 Rec, 69 Yds, TD

Scoring summary

Quarter	Time	Drive			Team	Scoring information	Score	
Quarter	Time	Plays	Yards	TOP	Team	Scoring information	ND	USC
1					USC	30-yard field goal by Abrams	0	3
1					USC	38-yard field goal by Abrams	0	6
2	14:23				Notre Dame	Spencer 1-yard touchdown run, Sanson kick good	7	6
3	0:23				Notre Dame	Champion 25-yard touchdown reception from Powlus, Sanson kick good	14	6
4					USC	C. Miller 5-yard touchdown reception from Otton, 2-point pass failed	14	12
4	4:52				Notre Dame	Denson 9-yard touchdown run, Sanson kick no good	20	12
4	1:50				USC	Washington 15-yard touchdown run, 2-point run good	20	20
OT					USC	Sermons 5-yard touchdown reception from Otton, Abrams kick good	20	27
"TOP" = time of possession. For other American football terms, see Glossary of American football.							20	27

== Roster ==
1996 Notre Dame Fighting Irish football team roster
Players
Coaches
Offense

Pos.	#	Name	Class
G	76	Jeremy Akers	Sr
WR	88	Bobby Brown	So
TE	58	Mike Burgdorf	Sr
TE	40	Kevin Carretta	Sr
WR	18	Cikai Champion	Sr
TE	98	Pete Chryplewicz	Sr
OT	75	Chris Clevenger	Sr
RB	23	Autry Denson	So
FB	44	Marc Edwards	Sr
RB	31	Robert Framer	Sr
QB	7	Jarious Jackson	Fr
WR	83	Malcolm Johnson	So
WR	84	Albert Jones	Sr
RB	26	Randy Kinder	Sr
QB	14	A.J. McGunigal	Sr
OT	54	Luke Petitgout	So
QB	3	Ron Powlus	Sr
G	79	Mike Rosenthal	So
OT	71	Jerry Wisne	So

Defense

Pos.	#	Name	Class
DE	56	Kurt Belisle	Jr
DE	95	Corey Bennett	Jr
P	35	Scott Palumbo	Sr
LB	13	Bertrand Berry	Sr
LB	6	Lyron Cobbins	Sr
DE	51	Melvin Dansby	Sr
LB	27	Bobbie Howard	So
LB	4	Kory Minor	So
CB	35	Robert Phelps	Sr
CB	15	Allen Rossum	Jr
DE	91	Darnell Smith	Sr
CB	21	Shannon Stephens	So
FS	12	Mario Strayhorn	So
LB	2	Kinnon Tatum	Sr
LB	49	Joe Thomas	So
LB	43	Bill Wagasy	Sr
LB	60	Antwoine Wellington	Fr
DE	48	Renaldo Wynn	Sr

Special teams

Pos.	#	Name	Class
K	19	Jim Sanson	Fr
P	8	Hunter Smith	So

Head coach

- Lou Holtz

Coordinators/assistant coaches

- Dave Roberts – Offensive coordinator
- Bob Davie – Defensive coordinator
- Urban Meyer – Wide receivers
- Charlie Strong – Defensive line

Legend

- (C) Team captain
- (S) Suspended
- (I) Ineligible
- Injured
- Redshirt

Roster

== Statistics ==
Passing

1. Ron Powlus - 133 of 232 (57.3%) for 1,942 yards, 12 touchdowns, 4 interceptions
2. Jarious Jackson - 10 of 15 (66.7%) for 181 yards, 3 touchdowns, 0 interceptions

Rushing

1. Autry Denson - 1,179 yards, 5.8-yard average, 8 touchdowns
2. Robert Farmer - 660 yards, 8.5-yard average, 8 touchdowns
3. Marc Edwards - 381 yards, 4.6-yard average, 8 touchdowns
4. Randy Kinder - 247 yards, 4.7-yard average, 3 touchdowns
5. Jamie Spencer - 222 yards, 5.8-yard average, 5 touchdowns

Receiving

1. Malcolm Johnson - 25 receptions for 449 yards, 2 touchdowns
2. Emmett Mosley - 24 receptions for 369 yards, 0 touchdowns
3. Pete Chryplewicz - 27 receptions for 331 yards, 4 touchdowns
4. Shannon Stephens - 9 receptions for 193 yards, 1 touchdown
5. Marc Edwards - 16 for 179 yards, 2 touchdowns
6. Raki Nelson - 8 receptions for 128 yards, 1 touchdown
7. Autry Denson - 11 receptions for 111 yards, 2 touchdowns

Scoring

1. Autry Denson - 66 points, 11 touchdowns
2. Marc Edwards - 62 points, 10 touchdowns, 1 two-point conversion
3. Jim Sanson - 57 points, 39 of 45 PAT, 6 of 9 field goals
4. Robert Farmer - 48 points, 8 touchdowns
5. Jamie Spencer - 36 points, 6 touchdowns
6. Allen Rossum - 24 points, 3 punt returns for touchdown, 1 kickoff return for touchdown
7. Pete Chryplewicz - 24 points, 4 touchdowns
8. Randy Kinder - 18 points, 3 touchdowns

Tackles

1. Kinnon Tatum - 77
2. Lyron Cobbins - 72
3. Benny Guilbeaux - 62
4. Renaldo Wynn - 61
5. Bertrand Berry - 60
6. Alton Maiden - 56
7. Melvin Dansby - 55
8. Kory Minor - 53
9. Covington - 53
10. Allen Rossum - 50
