= 1996 Northern Illinois Huskies football team =

American college football season

1996 Northern Illinois Huskies football
- Conference: Independent
- Record: 1–10
- Head coach: Joe Novak (1st season)
- Defensive coordinator: Mike Mallory
- MVPs: Mandel Hester; Mitch Jacoby; Charles Talley; Duane Hawthorne
- Captains: Mandel Hester; Mitch Jacoby
- Home stadium: Huskie Stadium

1996 NCAA Division I-A independents football records
	Conf.			Overall
Team	W		L	W		L
No. 25 Army		–		10	–	2
Navy		–		9	–	3
No. 19 Notre Dame		–		8	–	3
East Carolina		–		8	–	3
Louisiana Tech		–		6	–	5
UAB		–		5	–	6
UCF		–		5	–	6
Southwestern Louisiana		–		5	–	6
Northeast Louisiana		–		5	–	6
Arkansas State		–		4	–	7
Northern Illinois		–		1	–	10
Rankings from AP Poll

The 1996 Northern Illinois Huskies football team represented Northern Illinois University as an independent during the 1996 NCAA Division I-A football season. Led by first-year head coach Joe Novak, the Huskies compiled a record of 1–10. Running back Charles Talley had his second consecutive season with over 1,000 rushing yards. Northern Illinois played home games at Huskie Stadium in DeKalb, Illinois, United States.

== Schedule ==
Date	Time	Opponent	Site	TV	Result	Attendance	Source
August 31	6:00 pm	at Maryland*	Byrd Stadium; College Park, MD		L 6–30	32,517	
September 7	6:30 pm	Western Illinois*	Huskie Stadium; College Park, IL		L 0–17	21,370	
September 14	11:00 am	at No. 6 Penn State*	Beaver Stadium; University Park, PA	ESPN Plus	L 0–49	95,589	
September 21	6:00 pm	at Arkansas State	Indian Stadium; Jonesboro, AR		W 31–30	12,217	
September 28	3:00 pm	UTEP*	Huskie Stadium; DeKalb, IL		L 6–37	10,229	
October 5	3:00 pm	North Texas*	Huskie Stadium; DeKalb, IL	SCC	L 21–24	16,549	
October 19	2:00 pm	at Louisville*	Cardinal Stadium; Louisville, KY	SCC	L 3–27	36,467	
October 26	3:00 pm	Akron*	Huskie Stadium; DeKalb, IL	SCC	L 17–34	10,465	
November 2	1:00 pm	Louisiana Tech	Huskie Stadium; DeKalb, IL		L 14–40	6,208	
November 9	7:00 pm	at Southwestern Louisiana	Cajun Field; Lafayette, LA		L 31–45	15,721	
November 16	3:00 pm	at Oregon State*	Parker Stadium; Corvallis, OR		L 28–67	17,215	
*Non-conference game; Rankings from AP Poll released prior to the game; All times are in Central time

== Roster ==
1996 Northern Illinois Huskies football team roster
Players
Coaches
Offense

Pos.	#	Name	Class
WR	5	Cordell Smith	So
TB	6	Scott Florence	Sr
QB	15	Randall Foster	Fr
QB	16	Brandon Barker	Jr
QB	19	Kenneth Williams	Jr
RB	21	Marceo Haywood	So
TB	22	Mike Johnson	Fr
FB	39	Justin Knapp	Jr
FB	41	Matt Chambers	So
C	60	Kevin Johnson	So
OT	62	Jamie Macdonald	Jr
G	63	Jeff Winiarski	Fr
C	64	Bill Wise	So
G	65	Greg Merow	Fr
C	68	Nick Lundin	So
C	70	Wayne Thomson	Jr
OT	71	Chris Thornton	Jr
G	73	Kent Booth	Jr
G	74	Shane Waller	So
G	75	Keith Schulte	So
OT	77	Mike Belmontez	So
OT	78	Dennis Puralewski	Fr
TE	80	Bobby Reed	So
SE	81	Rhasaan Smith	Fr
TE	82	Mitch Jacoby	Sr
WR	85	Kurt Johanson	Fr
TE	87	Kevin Holm	Fr
WR	88	Leon Moody	Sr
TE	89	John Griffin	Fr

Defense

Pos.	#	Name	Class
CB	1	Buster Sampson	Fr
SS	2	Brian Overall	So
SS	9	Rayshon Jackson	So
CB	14	Duane Hawthorne	So
LB	23	Perry Amoo	So
CB	24	D. J. Roark	Fr
CB	27	Damien Mallory	Sr
FS	28	Kershawn McCullum	Jr
FS	29	Bill Brune	Fr
CB	32	William Triplett	Jr
SS	33	Mumin Muhammad	Fr
LB	35	Glen Bloodsaw	Fr
LB	36	Jason Douglas	Fr
LB	37	Orlando Bowen	So
LB	38	Craig Dykstra	Fr
FS	43	Patrick Stephen	So
SS	44	Salim Phillips	Jr
LB	45	Garett Sutherland	Jr
LB	47	Cameron Saulsby	Fr
LB	51	Steve Smith	Jr
LB	52	Terrell Alexander	Jr
LB	55	Keith Sims	So
LB	56	Damon Foster	Fr
LB	59	Daren Lloyd	Sr
NG	66	Ebbie Parsons	Fr
NG	72	Joe Rebholz	Fr
DT	84	Eric Dohrmann	Fr
DE	86	Bob Lesher	Fr
NG	90	Bill Simpson	Jr
DE	91	Justin Heitl	So
DE	92	Lewis Miskowicz	Fr
DT	93	Dan Stankowski	So
DE	94	Anthony Beauvais	Fr
DE	95	Abie Camacho	Jr
NG	96	Andy Ducar	So
DT	97	Steve Roads	Jr
DE	99	Will Ford	Jr

Special teams

Pos.	#	Name	Class
P	10	Brian Wiseman	So
PK	17	Brian Clark	So

Head coach

- Joe Novak

Coordinators/assistant coaches

Legend

- (C) Team captain
- (S) Suspended
- (I) Ineligible
- Injured
- Redshirt

Roster
Last update: January 28, 1997

== Season summary ==
Although the 1996 season was one of the most difficult in NIU history, it marked the start of Joe Novak's long-term rebuild. Within a few years, NIU became a respected MAC contender, producing NFL talent and multiple bowl appearances. This season is often viewed as the foundation for that turnaround where key players stepped up to set a new tone for the program. The 1996 NIU Huskies finished 1–10 in what became the first season of the Joe Novak era, a year remembered less for wins and more for laying the foundation of a long-term rebuild that would eventually transform the program. The 1996 season didn't start with fanfare. It started with honesty. Joe Novak, hired after years as a respected defensive coordinator at Miami (OH), walked into a program that had been drifting. NIU had cycled through coaches, struggled for identity, and lacked the depth needed to compete at the Division I-A level. Novak knew it. The players knew it. The fans knew it. But Novak also believed something deeper: you can build a program on toughness, discipline, and development – even if the wins don't come right away. 1996 was the year he began that work. The opener at Maryland was a preview of what was coming. NIU fought, but the talent gap was obvious. A 30–6 loss set the tone. Then came Western Illinois, an FCS opponent – and a shutout loss at home. It was the moment everyone realized the rebuild would be deeper than expected. And then, the gauntlet: at No. 6 Penn State, in front of more than 95,000 fans. The Nittany Lions rolled, 49–0. It wasn't just a loss; it was a lesson in what a top-tier program looked like. Novak didn't sugarcoat it. He told reporters the truth: "We're not there yet. But we will be."

On September 21, something clicked.NIU traveled to Arkansas State – a winnable game, but on the road, and nothing had come easy. What followed was the most dramatic performance of the season. Charles Talley ran with purpose. Brandon Barker made timely throws. The defense forced mistakes instead of making them. NIU clawed back and stunned Arkansas State 31–30, earning their only win of the year. For a team searching for belief, it mattered. Players still talk about that game as the moment they realized Novak's system could work. The next stretch was a mix of heartbreak and hard reality. North Texas (24–21) slipped away late. Akron (34–17) exposed defensive depth issues. UTEP (37–6) showed how thin the roster truly was. But even in the losses, something was changing. The team was playing harder. The mistakes were fewer. The culture was shifting. Novak wasn't chasing quick fixes. He was building a foundation.

Late Season: The Storm Before the Calm. The final month was brutal. Louisville overwhelmed NIU with speed. Louisiana Tech and Southwestern Louisiana (now Louisiana) attacked a defense running on fumes. Oregon State closed the season with a 67–28 blowout that felt like a symbolic bottoming out. But inside the program, the mood wasn't despair. It was resolve. Players later said that 1996 was the year they learned how to be accountable – to themselves, to each other, and to the standard Novak demanded. On paper, 1996 was one of the worst seasons in NIU history. But in reality, it was the turning point. Novak established the culture. Young players, such as Mike Stokes, gained experience they would later use to win. The staff identified who could be part of the rebuild. The program began to attract tougher, hungrier recruits. Within a few years, NIU was beating ranked teams, producing NFL talent, and becoming a MAC powerhouse. None of that happens without the pain of 1996. It was the season that broke the old NIU – and built the new one.

The offense was a unit searching for identity in the first year of the Novak rebuild. The 1996 NIU offense was a group caught between eras. It inherited personnel from the previous regime but was now being asked to run Joe Novak's more physical, disciplined, ball‑control philosophy. The result was an offense that flashed potential but struggled with consistency, depth, and execution. Despite the challenges, the season produced a few bright spots – including a 1,000‑yard rusher and a tight end who became one of the team's most reliable weapons. Charles Talley was a tough running back who had just finished a 1995 season where he finished with 1,540 rushing yards. For 1996, Talley was the engine of the offense, carrying the ball 241 times for 1,008 yards – a remarkable feat on a 1–10 team constantly playing from behind. He ran with toughness, vision, and durability, often creating yards after contact because the blocking wasn't there. Other notable running backs included Scott Florence who added 298 yards. Mike Stokes with an impressive 127. The fullbacks were mostly used as blockers. The run game was the most stable part of the offense, but defenses stacked the box because NIU lacked a consistent passing threat as the quarterback position was a revolving door with Brandon Barker as the primary starter. Randall Foster and Kenneth Williams rotated in at times. Protection issues and limited receiver separation meant the passing game rarely found rhythm. Key passing stats included Barker: 1,223 yards, 2 TD, 10 INT. Foster: 158 yards, 3 TD. Williams: 95 yards. The offense often faced long down‑and‑distance situations, making sustained drives difficult. Receiving corps had a few playmakers, not enough firepower. Deon Mitchell emerged as the top target with 36 receptions, 524 yards. A legitimate deep threat when the line held up long enough Leon Moody provided a reliable second option with 328 yards. Rhasaan Smith contributed in the slot with 145 yards. But the breakout star was actually a tight end, Mitch Jacoby with 29 receptions, 302 yards and was one of the team's MVPs. A security blanket in an offense that desperately needed one. Jacoby's toughness and consistency made him one of the most dependable players on the roster. The offensive line was often the biggest challenge. This was the unit most affected by the transition with limited depth and young players forced into early action that showed struggles in pass protection and a difficulty with generating push against bigger defensive fronts. The line's growing pains were a major reason the offense stalled in many games with the best offensive performance coming in a 31–30 win at Arkansas State where Talley ran with purpose and Barker hit timely throws that allowed the offense sustained drives and a controlled tempo. It was the only game where the offense looked like the version Novak hoped to build. Overall offensive identity was run‑heavy and gritty but inconsistent with limited depth and experience and carried by a few standout players. But it also laid the groundwork for the future by establishing the run-first mentality and developing young linemen while identifying core leaders such as standout freshman Mike Stokes. As a star at Joliet Central High School, Stokes is considered one of the greatest football player to come from the Joliet Central program and became an immediate contributor to the offense. Supporting Talley's punishing running style, Stokes was a superb change of pace running back with vision and a running style that was often compared to NFL running back Emmitt Smith. Stokes presence led to building the toughness that would define NIU in the 2000s with a run first offense that built the foundation. The 1996 defense was the group most affected by the transition into the Joe Novak era. Novak, a defensive coach by trade, inherited a roster that lacked size, depth, and experience – especially in the front seven. As a result, the defense spent long stretches on the field, often defending short fields after offensive struggles. Despite the numbers, this unit produced several future leaders and one eventual NFL player. The defense was defined by thin depth, especially on the line and young players forced into major roles. A bend‑until‑it‑breaks reality due to time of possession issues and flashes of individual talent, especially in the secondary, led by younger players such as Duane Hawthorne, D.J. Roark, Rayshon Jackson and Damien Mallory. The Mike Mallory defensive unit allowed 36.4 points per game, but the story behind those numbers is more nuanced – they were simply outmanned and outnumbered. Other key statistics included total yards allowed per game at 422.0. Passing yards allowed at 168.5. Rushing yards allowed at 253.5. Opponent yards per play at 6.1. Opponent first downs per game at 22.3. Opponent turnovers per game at 2.1. With defensive statistical contributors including Duane Hawthorne, MVP and top performer with 58 tackles / 1 interception. Mandel Hester MVP and team captain. Rayshon Jackson, a solid and consistent player with 39 tackles / 1 interception. Damien Mallory, intelligence of the squad with 35 tackles / 1 interception. Dan Stankowski, the "wall" of the defensive line with 28 tackles / 1 sack. D.J. Roark, the heart of the defense who led the team in hard hit tackles. Important: These are the only defenders with recorded statistics, a known limitation of NIU's mid‑90s recordkeeping.

The defensive line was led by Dan Stankowski (DT), Whom played along other line contributors such as Bill Simpson (NG), Abie Camacho (DE), Steve Rhoads (DT), Will Ford (DE), and Eric Dohrmann (DT). However, the line's struggles meant linebackers were often taking on blocks early, and the secondary was left exposed. The linebackers were the heart of the defense, but they were put in impossible situations. Mandel Hester (LB) was the senior linebacker, team captain, and one of the four official MVPs of the 1996 Northern Illinois football team. He was the center of a roster going through a brutal rebuild, and his leadership was significant enough to where he earned MVP honors despite limited statistical records. Other top linebackers on this team included Garett Sutherland (LB), Cameron Saulsby (LB), Steve Smith (LB), Terrell Alexander (LB), Keith Sims (LB), Damon Foster (LB), (LB, special teams contributor), and Daren Lloyd (LB). Even though the team had its struggles, the defensive secondary carried the defense and produced a solid season led by Duane Hawthorne, D.J. Roark, William Triplett, Patrick Stephens, Buster Sampson, Bryan Overall, Rayshon Jackson, Damien Mallory, Kershawn McCullum, Bill Brune, Mumin Muhammad, and Salim Phillips. The squad was coached by Scott Shafer who went on to eventually become head football coach at Syracuse University. Rayshon Jackson led the Defense in tackles, playing alongside William Triplett (CB), Patrick Stephens, Buster Sampson, Bryan Overall, Damien Mallory, Kershawn McCullum, Bill Brune, Mumin Muhammad, Salim Phillips, and D.J. Roark.
