= 1996 Penn Quakers football team =

American college football season

1996 Penn Quakers football
- Conference: Ivy League
- Record: 5–5 (3–4 Ivy)
- Head coach: Al Bagnoli (5th season)
- Defensive coordinator: Mike Toop (5th season)
- Home stadium: Franklin Field

1996 Ivy League football standings
	Conf.			Overall
Team	W		L	W		L
No. 17 Dartmouth $	7	–	0	10	–	0
Columbia	5	–	2	8	–	2
Brown	4	–	3	5	–	5
Cornell	4	–	3	4	–	6
Penn	3	–	4	5	–	5
Harvard	2	–	5	4	–	6
Princeton	2	–	5	3	–	7
Yale	1	–	6	2	–	8
$ – Conference champion; Rankings from The Sports Network poll

The 1996 Penn Quakers football team was an American football team that represented the University of Pennsylvania in the Ivy League during the 1996 NCAA Division I-AA football season.

== Background ==
During its fifth season under head coach Al Bagnoli, the team compiled a 5–5 record (3–4 against Ivy League opponents). Tim Gage and Matt Julien were the team captains.

Defensive tackle Mitch Marrow led the team on defense; at the end of the season, he was selected as a first-team All-American. Jasen Scott was selected as the team's most valuable player. Barrow and Scott both received first-team honors on the 1997 All-Ivy League team.

The team's statistical leaders included Tom MacLeod with 720 passing yards, Mark Fabish with 302 receiving yards, and Jasen Scott with 1,193 rushing yards and 68 points scored.

== Schedule ==
Date	Opponent	Site	Result	Attendance	Source
September 21	at Dartmouth	Memorial Field; Hanover, NH	L 22–24	8,521	
September 28	Colgate*	Franklin Field; Philadelphia, PA	W 38–7	11,214	
October 5	at Bucknell*	Christy Mathewson–Memorial Stadium; Lewisburg, PA	W 30–21 ^{OT}	9,166	
October 12	Columbia	Franklin Field; Philadelphia, PA	L 19–20	6,435	
October 19	Lehigh*	Franklin Field; Philadelphia, PA	L 24–28	5,074	
October 26	at Brown	Brown Stadium; Providence, RI	L 21–27	5,125	
November 2	Yale	Franklin Field; Philadelphia, PA	W 20–3	19,203	
November 9	at Princeton	Palmer Stadium; Princeton, NJ (rivalry)	W 10–6	10,034	
November 16	Harvard	Franklin Field; Philadelphia, PA (rivalry)	W 17–12	21,509	
November 23	at Cornell	Schoellkopf Field; Ithaca, NY (rivalry)	L 21–24	5,223	
*Non-conference game

== Roster ==
1996 Penn Quakers football team roster
Players
Coaches
Offense

Pos.	#	Name	Class
RB	32	Aman Abye	Sr
RB	46	Marc Aneed	So
TE	88	Travis Arbogast	Jr
OL	79	Aaron Atkins	Jr
QB	14	Joe Beggans	Jr
OL	57	Mike Bertolino	Fr
WR	5	Mark Fabish	Sr
QB	10	Tom MacLeod	Jr

Defense

Pos.	#	Name	Class
DE	82	Bandele Adeniyi-Bada	So
DE	94	Patrick Altman	Fr
DB	31	Melvin Alexander	Fr
DB	20	Joey Alofaitulli	Fr
DE	33	Michael Elko	So
DL	69	Jason Maehr	So
DL	65	Mitch Marrow	Sr
DL	60	Chris Osentowski	Sr

Special teams

Pos.	#	Name	Class
K	4	Jeremiah Greathouse	Jr
PK	48	Kendall Hochman	So
K	47	Doug Miller	Sr
P	41	Jeffrey Salvino	Jr

Head coach

- Al Bagnoli

Coordinators/assistant coaches

Legend

- (C) Team captain
- (S) Suspended
- (I) Ineligible
- Injured
- Redshirt

Roster
