= 1996 Holy Cross Crusaders football team =

American college football season

1996 Holy Cross Crusaders football
- Conference: Patriot League
- Record: 2–9 (1–4 Patriot)
- Head coach: Dan Allen (1st season)
- Defensive coordinator: Tom Quinn (1st season)
- Captains: David Streeter; Mike Zimirowski
- Home stadium: Fitton Field

1996 Patriot League football standings
	Conf.			Overall
Team	W		L	W		L
Bucknell $	4	–	1	6	–	5
Colgate	3	–	2	6	–	5
Lehigh	3	–	2	5	–	6
Lafayette	2	–	2	5	–	5
Fordham	1	–	3	2	–	8
Holy Cross	1	–	4	2	–	9
$ – Conference champion

The 1996 Holy Cross Crusaders football team was an American football team that represented the College of the Holy Cross during the 1996 NCAA Division I-AA football season. Holy Cross finished last in the Patriot League.

In their first year under head coach Dan Allen, the Crusaders compiled a 2–9 record. David Streeter and Mike Zimirowski were the team captains.

The Crusaders were outscored 351 to 209. Their 1–5 conference record was the worst in the six-team Patriot League standings.

Holy Cross played its home games at Fitton Field on the college campus in Worcester, Massachusetts.

== Schedule ==
Date	Opponent	Site	Result	Attendance	Source
September 14	UMass*	Fitton Field; Worcester, MA	L 10–28	8,770	
September 21	at Colgate	Andy Kerr Stadium; Hamilton, NY	W 38–21	4,000	
September 28	at Princeton*	Palmer Stadium; Princeton, NJ	L 30–37	5,451	
October 5	Columbia^{†}*	Fitton Field; Worcester, MA	L 16–42	9,349	
October 12	at Dartmouth*	Memorial Field; Hanover, NH	L 7–35	6,112	
October 19	Harvard*	Fitton Field; Worcester, MA	L 25–28	4,647	
October 26	Bucknell^	Fitton Field; Worcester, MA	L 7–38	10,671	
November 2	at Fordham	Coffey Field; Bronx, NY (rivalry)	L 0–28	2,217	
November 9	Lehigh	Fitton Field; Worcester, MA	L 10–20	2,863	
November 16	at Lafayette	Fisher Field; Easton, PA	L 21–38	4,814	
November 23	at Georgetown*	Kehoe Field; Washington, DC	W 45–36	2,816	
*Non-conference game; ^{†}Homecoming; ^ Family Weekend
