= 1996 Brown Bears football team =

American college football season

1996 Brown Bears football
- Conference: Ivy League
- Record: 5–5 (4–3 Ivy)
- Head coach: Mark Whipple (3rd season)
- Defensive coordinator: Don Brown (1st season)
- Captain: Brendan Finneran
- Home stadium: Brown Stadium

1996 Ivy League football standings
	Conf.			Overall
Team	W		L	W		L
No. 17 Dartmouth $	7	–	0	10	–	0
Columbia	5	–	2	8	–	2
Brown	4	–	3	5	–	5
Cornell	4	–	3	4	–	6
Penn	3	–	4	5	–	5
Harvard	2	–	5	4	–	6
Princeton	2	–	5	3	–	7
Yale	1	–	6	2	–	8
$ – Conference champion; Rankings from The Sports Network poll

The 1996 Brown Bears football team was an American football team that represented Brown University during the 1996 NCAA Division I-AA football season. Brown tied for third in the Ivy League.

In their third season under head coach Mark Whipple, the Bears compiled a 5–5 record and were outscored 246 to 238. Brendan Finneran was the team captain.

The Bears' 4–3 conference tied for third in the Ivy League standings. They outscored Ivy opponents 171 to 160.

Brown played its home games at Brown Stadium in Providence, Rhode Island.

== Schedule ==
Date	Opponent	Site	Result	Attendance	Source
September 21	Yale	Brown Stadium; Providence, RI	L 0–30	7,304	
September 28	at Rhode Island*	Meade Stadium; Kingston, RI (rivalry)	L 13–28	3,750	
October 5	at Colgate*	Andy Kerr Stadium; Hamilton, NY	L 27–44	6,500	
October 12	at Princeton	Palmer Stadium; Princeton, NJ	W 27–23	8,030	
October 19	Fordham*	Brown Stadium; Providence, RI	W 27–14		
October 26	Penn^{†}	Brown Stadium; Providence, RI	W 27–21	5,125	
November 2	at Cornell	Schoellkopf Field; Ithaca, NY	W 35–21	8,202	
November 9	at Harvard	Harvard Stadium; Boston, MA	W 31–7	2,133	
November 16	No. 19 Dartmouth	Brown Stadium; Providence, RI	L 24–27	8,257	
November 23	at Columbia	Wien Stadium; New York, NY	L 27–31	5,175	
*Non-conference game; ^{†}Homecoming; Rankings from The Sports Network Poll released prior to the game
