= 1996 Dartmouth Big Green football team =

American college football season

1996 Dartmouth Big Green football

Ivy League champion
- Conference: Ivy League

Ranking
- Sports Network: No. 17
- Record: 10–0 (7–0 Ivy)
- Head coach: John Lyons (5th season)
- Offensive coordinator: Roger Hughes (5th season)
- Home stadium: Memorial Field

1996 Ivy League football standings
	Conf.			Overall
Team	W		L	W		L
No. 17 Dartmouth $	7	–	0	10	–	0
Columbia	5	–	2	8	–	2
Brown	4	–	3	5	–	5
Cornell	4	–	3	4	–	6
Penn	3	–	4	5	–	5
Harvard	2	–	5	4	–	6
Princeton	2	–	5	3	–	7
Yale	1	–	6	2	–	8
$ – Conference champion; Rankings from The Sports Network poll

The 1996 Dartmouth Big Green football team represented Dartmouth College as a member of the Ivy League during the 1996 NCAA Division I-AA football season. Led by fifth-year head coach John Lyons, the Big Green compiled an overall record of 10–0 with a mark or 7–0, winning the Ivy League title. The team played home games at Memorial Field in Hanover, New Hampshire.

== Schedule ==
Date	Opponent	Site	Result	Attendance	Source
September 21	Penn	Memorial Field; Hanover, NH	W 24–22	8,521	
September 28	at Lehigh*	Goodman Stadium; Bethlehem, PA	W 21–14	11,325	
October 5	Fordham*	Memorial Field; Hanover, NH	W 20–7	6,105	
October 12	Holy Cross*	Memorial Field; Hanover, NH	W 35–7	6,112	
October 19	Yale	Memorial Field; Hanover, NH	W 40–6	10,119	
October 26	at Cornell	Schoellkopf Field; Ithaca, NY (rivalry)	W 38–21	8,226	
November 2	at Harvard	Harvard Stadium; Boston, MA (rivalry)	W 6–3	17,100	
November 9	Columbia	Memorial Field; Hanover, NH	W 40–0	5,119	
November 16	at Brown	Brown Stadium; Providence, RI	W 27–24	8,257	
November 23	at Princeton	Palmer Stadium; Princeton, NJ	W 24–0	16,461	
*Non-conference game
