= 1996 Harvard Crimson football team =

American college football season

1996 Harvard Crimson football
- Conference: Ivy League
- Record: 4–6 (2–5 Ivy)
- Head coach: Timothy Murphy (3rd season)
- Co-offensive coordinators: Michael Foley (3rd season); Jay Mills (1st season)
- Offensive scheme: Multiple
- Defensive coordinator: Mark Harriman (3rd season)
- Captain: Sean Riley
- Home stadium: Harvard Stadium

1996 Ivy League football standings
	Conf.			Overall
Team	W		L	W		L
No. 17 Dartmouth $	7	–	0	10	–	0
Columbia	5	–	2	8	–	2
Brown	4	–	3	5	–	5
Cornell	4	–	3	4	–	6
Penn	3	–	4	5	–	5
Harvard	2	–	5	4	–	6
Princeton	2	–	5	3	–	7
Yale	1	–	6	2	–	8
$ – Conference champion; Rankings from The Sports Network poll

The 1996 Harvard Crimson football team was an American football team that represented Harvard University during the 1996 NCAA Division I-AA football season. The Crimson tied for second-to-last in the Ivy League.

In their third year under head coach Timothy Murphy, the Crimson compiled a 4–6 record and were outscored 164 to 163. Sean Riley was the team captain.

Harvard's 2–5 conference record tied for sixth in the Ivy League standings. The Crimson were outscored 115 to 98 by Ivy opponents.

Harvard played its home games at Harvard Stadium in the Allston neighborhood of Boston, Massachusetts.

== Schedule ==
Date	Opponent	Site	Result	Attendance	Source
September 21	at Columbia	Wien Stadium; New York, NY	L 13–20 ^{OT}	5,760	
September 28	at Bucknell*	Christy Mathewson–Memorial Stadium; Lewisburg, PA	W 30–7	6,064	
October 5	Lafayette*	Harvard Stadium; Boston, MA	L 7–17	8,860	
October 12	Cornell	Harvard Stadium; Boston, MA	L 13–20	8,700	
October 19	at Holy Cross*	Fitton Field; Worcester, MA	W 28–25	4,647	
October 26	at Princeton	Palmer Stadium; Princeton, NJ (rivalry)	W 24–0	14,410	
November 2	Dartmouth	Harvard Stadium; Boston, MA (rivalry)	L 3–6	17,100	
November 9	Brown	Harvard Stadium; Boston, MA	L 7–31	2,133	
November 16	at Penn	Franklin Field; Philadelphia, PA	L 12–17	21,509	
November 23	Yale	Harvard Stadium; Boston, MA (The Game)	W 26–21	24,470	
*Non-conference game

== Roster ==
1996 Harvard Crimson football team roster
Players
Coaches
Offense

Pos.	#	Name	Class
OT	50	Matt Birk	Jr
TE	80	Chris Eitzmann	So

Defense

Pos.	#	Name	Class
LB	49	Isaiah Kacyvenski	Fr

Special teams

Pos.	#	Name	Class

Head coach

- Timothy Murphy

Coordinators/assistant coaches

- Lou Anarumo
  (Assistant head coach / defensive backs / special teams)

Legend

- (C) Team captain
- (S) Suspended
- (I) Ineligible
- Injured
- Redshirt

Roster
