= 1996 Lehigh Mountain Hawks football team =

American college football season

1996 Lehigh Mountain Hawks football
- Conference: Patriot League
- Record: 5–6 (3–2 Patriot)
- Head coach: Kevin Higgins (3rd season)
- Offensive coordinator: Andy Coen (1st season)
- Captains: Brian Bartelle; Lance Eckenrode; Mark Miller; Doug Yates
- Home stadium: Goodman Stadium

1996 Patriot League football standings
	Conf.			Overall
Team	W		L	W		L
Bucknell $	4	–	1	6	–	5
Colgate	3	–	2	6	–	5
Lehigh	3	–	2	5	–	6
Lafayette	2	–	2	5	–	5
Fordham	1	–	3	2	–	8
Holy Cross	1	–	4	2	–	9
$ – Conference champion

The 1996 Lehigh Mountain Hawks football team was an American football team that represented Lehigh University during the 1996 NCAA Division I-AA football season. Lehigh finished third in the Patriot League.

In their third year under head coach Kevin Higgins, the newly renamed Mountain Hawks compiled a 5–6 record. Brian Bartelle, Lance Eckenrode, Mark Miller and Doug Yates were the team captains.

The Mountain Hawks were outscored 264 to 208. Their 3–2 conference record, however, placed third in the six-team Patriot League standings.

Lehigh's football team competed under a new name for the first time since 1914. The "Mountain Hawk" mascot had been introduced in November 1995, but the football team completed that season under its longstanding "Engineers" name.

In the ensuing months, many fans and alumni were vocal about their attachment to the "Engineers" nickname and brown-and-white colors. As late as spring 1996, college administrators were reaffirming that Lehigh's teams were still officially known as "Engineers". By the start of the 1996 football season, however, the new identity had taken hold.

Lehigh played its home games at Goodman Stadium on the university's Goodman Campus in Bethlehem, Pennsylvania.

== Schedule ==
Date	Opponent	Site	Result	Attendance	Source
September 7	at No. 5 Delaware*	Delaware Stadium; Newark, DE (rivalry)	L 7–49	15,520	
September 14	Fordham	Goodman Stadium; Bethlehem, PA	W 20–14	6,527	
September 21	Buffalo*	Goodman Stadium; Bethlehem, PA	L 20–34	8,227	
September 28	Dartmouth^{†}*	Goodman Stadium; Bethlehem, PA	L 14–21	11,325	
October 5	at Princeton*	Palmer Stadium; Princeton, NJ	W 20–14	7,053	
October 12	at No. 24 New Hampshire*	Cowell Stadium; Durham, NH	L 27–42	7,335	
October 19	at Penn*	Franklin Field; Philadelphia, PA	W 28–24	5,074	
November 2	Bucknell	Goodman Stadium; Bethlehem, PA	L 6–7	10,271	
November 9	at Holy Cross	Fitton Field; Worcester, MA	W 20–10	2,863	
November 16	Colgate	Goodman Stadium; Bethlehem, PA	L 23–30	6,104	
November 23	at Lafayette	Fisher Field; Easton, PA (The Rivalry)	W 23–19	13,208	
*Non-conference game; ^{†}Homecoming; Rankings from The Sports Network Poll released prior to the game
