= 1996 Princeton Tigers football team =

American college football season

1996 Princeton Tigers football
- Conference: Ivy League
- Record: 3–7 (2–5 Ivy)
- Head coach: Steve Tosches (10th season)
- Captains: Jimmy Archie; Marc Washington
- Home stadium: Palmer Stadium

1996 Ivy League football standings
	Conf.			Overall
Team	W		L	W		L
No. 17 Dartmouth $	7	–	0	10	–	0
Columbia	5	–	2	8	–	2
Brown	4	–	3	5	–	5
Cornell	4	–	3	4	–	6
Penn	3	–	4	5	–	5
Harvard	2	–	5	4	–	6
Princeton	2	–	5	3	–	7
Yale	1	–	6	2	–	8
$ – Conference champion; Rankings from The Sports Network poll

The 1996 Princeton Tigers football team was an American football team that represented Princeton University during the 1996 NCAA Division I-AA football season. In its final year at Palmer Stadium, Princeton tied for second-to-last in the Ivy League.

In their 10th year under head coach Steve Tosches, the Tigers compiled a 3–7 record and were outscored 202 to 144. Jimmy Archie and Marc Washington were the team captains.

Princeton's 2–5 conference record tied for sixth place in the Ivy League standings. The Tigers were outscored 142 to 87 by Ivy League opponents.

Princeton played its home games, for the 83rd and final year, at Palmer Stadium on the university campus in Princeton, New Jersey. After the 1996 season, Palmer Stadium was demolished to make way for its replacement.

== Schedule ==
Date	Opponent	Site	Result	Attendance	Source
September 21	at Cornell	Schoellkopf Field; Ithaca, NY	L 27–33 ^{OT}	14,120	
September 28	Holy Cross*	Palmer Stadium; Princeton, NJ	W 37–30	5,451	
October 5	Lehigh*	Palmer Stadium; Princeton, NJ	L 14–20	7,053	
October 12	Brown	Palmer Stadium; Princeton, NJ	L 23–27	8,030	
October 19	at Bucknell*	Christy Mathewson–Memorial Stadium; Lewisburg, PA	L 6–10	2,166	
October 26	Harvard	Palmer Stadium; Princeton, NJ (rivalry)	L 0–24	14,410	
November 2	at Columbia	Wien Stadium; New York, NY	W 14–11	9,100	
November 9	Penn	Palmer Stadium; Princeton, NJ (rivalry)	L 6–10	10,034	
November 16	at Yale	Yale Bowl; New Haven, CT (rivalry)	W 17–13	29,469	
November 23	No. 18 Dartmouth	Palmer Stadium; Princeton, NJ	L 0–24	16,461	
*Non-conference game; Rankings from The Sports Network Poll released prior to the game
