= 1996 Southwestern Louisiana Ragin' Cajuns football team =

American college football season

1996 Southwestern Louisiana Ragin' Cajuns football
- Conference: Independent
- Record: 5–6
- Head coach: Nelson Stokley (11th season)
- Offensive coordinator: Doug Fertsch (1st season)
- Home stadium: Cajun Field

1996 NCAA Division I-A independents football records
	Conf.			Overall
Team	W		L	W		L
No. 25 Army		–		10	–	2
Navy		–		9	–	3
No. 19 Notre Dame		–		8	–	3
East Carolina		–		8	–	3
Louisiana Tech		–		6	–	5
UAB		–		5	–	6
UCF		–		5	–	6
Southwestern Louisiana		–		5	–	6
Northeast Louisiana		–		5	–	6
Arkansas State		–		4	–	7
Northern Illinois		–		1	–	10
Rankings from AP Poll

The 1996 Southwestern Louisiana Ragin' Cajuns football team was an American football team that represented the University of Southwestern Louisiana (now known as the University of Louisiana at Lafayette) as an independent during the 1996 NCAA Division I-A football season. In their 11th year under head coach Nelson Stokley, the Ragin' Cajuns compiled a 5–6 record.

== Schedule ==
Date	Opponent	Site	Result	Attendance	Source
August 31	at No. 4 Florida	Ben Hill Griffin Stadium; Gainesville, FL	L 21–55	85,050	
September 14	No. 25 Texas A&M	Cajun Field; Lafayette, LA	W 29–22	38,783	
September 21	at Southern Miss	M. M. Roberts Stadium; Hattiesburg, MS	L 27–52	23,169	
September 28	at Louisiana Tech	Joe Aillet Stadium; Ruston, LA (rivalry)	W 37–31	20,432	
October 5	Houston	Cajun Field; Lafayette, LA	L 24–21	18,247	
October 12	Arkansas State	Cajun Field; Lafayette, LA	W 42–31		
October 19	at UAB	Legion Field; Birmingham, AL	L 29–39	16,327	
October 26	Memphis	Cajun Field; Lafayette, LA	W 13–9	10,555	
November 2	at Virginia Tech	Lane Stadium; Blacksburg, VA	L 16–47	35,643	
November 9	Northern Illinois	Cajun Field; Lafayette, LA	W 45–31	15,721	
November 16	at Texas Tech	Jones Stadium; Lubbock, TX	L 21–56	38,097	
Rankings from AP Poll released prior to the game
