= John Bobo =

American football player and coach (born 1958)

Biographical details
- Born: February 18, 1958 (age 68)

Playing career
- 1976–1979: Maryville (TN)
- Positions: Tight end, defensive end

Coaching career (HC unless noted)
- 1986: Alabama (GA/OL)
- 1987–1990: Tampa Bay Buccaneers (assistant)
- 1991: Louisville (assistant)
- 1992: Arkansas State (OL)
- 1993–1996: Arkansas State
- 1997–1998: Middle Tennessee (OC)

Head coaching record
- Overall: 13–30–1

John Bobo (born February 18, 1958) is an American former football player and coach He served as the head football coach at Arkansas State University from 1993 to 1996, compiling a record of 13–30–1.

== Head coaching record ==
Year	Team	Overall	Conference	Standing	Bowl/playoffs
Arkansas State Indians (Big West Conference) (1993–1995)
1993	Arkansas State	2–8–1	1–5	10th	
1994	Arkansas State	1–10	0–6	10th	
1995	Arkansas State	6–5	3–3	T–4th	Big West Conference Coach of the Year
Arkansas State Indians (NCAA Division I-A Independent) (1996)
1996	Arkansas State	4–7			
Arkansas State:		13–30–1	4–14		
Total:		13–30–1			
