= 1996 Northeast Louisiana Indians football team =

American college football season

1996 Northeast Louisiana Indians football
- Conference: Independent
- Record: 5–6
- Head coach: Ed Zaunbrecher (3rd season)
- Offensive coordinator: Ed Zaunbrecher (3rd season)
- Defensive coordinator: Drew Fabianich (1st season)
- Home stadium: Malone Stadium

1996 NCAA Division I-A independents football records
	Conf.			Overall
Team	W		L	W		L
No. 25 Army		–		10	–	2
Navy		–		9	–	3
No. 19 Notre Dame		–		8	–	3
East Carolina		–		8	–	3
Louisiana Tech		–		6	–	5
UAB		–		5	–	6
UCF		–		5	–	6
Southwestern Louisiana		–		5	–	6
Northeast Louisiana		–		5	–	6
Arkansas State		–		4	–	7
Northern Illinois		–		1	–	10
Rankings from AP Poll

The 1996 Northeast Louisiana Indians football team represented Northeast Louisiana University (now known as the University of Louisiana at Monroe) as an independent during the 1996 NCAA Division I-A football season. Led by third-year head coach Ed Zaunbrecher, the Indians compiled an overall record of 5–6, and the offense scored 192 points while the defense allowed 353 points. The team played home games at Malone Stadium in Monroe, Louisiana.

== Schedule ==
Date	Time	Opponent	Site	Result	Attendance	Source
August 29		Nicholls State	Malone Stadium; Monroe, LA	W 14–12	13,012	
September 7	7:00 pm	Minnesota	Malone Stadium; Monroe, LA	L 3–30	24,842	
September 14	9:00 pm	at UCLA	Rose Bowl; Pasadena, CA	L 0–44	49,990	
September 21		Sam Houston State	Malone Stadium; Monroe, LA	W 34–31	12,148	
September 28	6:00 pm	at Arkansas	War Memorial Stadium; Little Rock, AR	L 21–38	48,816	
October 5		No. 19 (I-AA) Northwestern State	Malone Stadium; Monroe, LA (rivalry)	W 13–10		
October 19		at UCF	Florida Citrus Bowl; Orlando, FL	W 39–38	16,293	
November 2	1:30 pm	at Mississippi State	Scott Field; Starkville, MS	L 0–59	31,038	
November 9	1:00 pm	at No. 22 Auburn	Jordan-Hare Stadium; Auburn, AL	L 24–28	78,309	
November 16		Jacksonville State	Malone Stadium; Monroe, LA	W 31–28 ^{2OT}	10,562	
November 23		at Cincinnati	Nippert Stadium; Cincinnati, OH	L 13–35	17,686	
Rankings from AP Poll released prior to the game; All times are in Central time
