= 1996 Colgate Red Raiders football team =

American college football season

1996 Colgate Red Raiders football
- Conference: Patriot League
- Record: 6–5 (3–2 Patriot)
- Head coach: Dick Biddle (1st season)
- Captains: Marcus Cameron; Adam Sofran
- Home stadium: Andy Kerr Stadium

1996 Patriot League football standings
	Conf.			Overall
Team	W		L	W		L
Bucknell $	4	–	1	6	–	5
Colgate	3	–	2	6	–	5
Lehigh	3	–	2	5	–	6
Lafayette	2	–	2	5	–	5
Fordham	1	–	3	2	–	8
Holy Cross	1	–	4	2	–	9
$ – Conference champion

The 1996 Colgate Red Raiders football team was an American football team that represented Colgate University during the 1996 NCAA Division I-AA football season. Colgate tied for second in the Patriot League.

In its first season under head coach Dick Biddle, the team compiled a 6–5 record. Marcus Cameron and Adam Sofran were the team captains.

The Red Raiders outscored opponents 285 to 254. Their 3–2 conference record tied for second in the six-team Patriot League standings.

The team played its home games at Andy Kerr Stadium in Hamilton, New York.

== Schedule ==
Date	Opponent	Site	Result	Attendance	Source
September 7	at Richmond*	City Stadium; Richmond, VA	L 0–13	11,089	
September 14	Buffalo*	Andy Kerr Stadium; Hamilton, NY	L 16–36	3,000	
September 21	Holy Cross	Andy Kerr Stadium; Hamilton, NY	L 21–38	4,000	
September 28	at Penn*	Franklin Field; Philadelphia, PA	L 7–38	11,214	
October 5	Brown*	Andy Kerr Stadium; Hamilton, NY	W 44–27	6,500	
October 12	at Towson State*	Minnegan Stadium; Towson, MD	W 35–10	2,741	
October 19	at Cornell*	Schoellkopf Field; Ithaca, NY (rivalry)	W 31–21	5,943	
October 26	Lafayette	Andy Kerr Stadium; Hamilton, NY	W 40–9	5,500	
November 9	at Fordham	Coffey Field; Bronx, NY	W 34–13		
November 16	at Lehigh	Goodman Stadium; Bethlehem, PA	W 30–23	6,104	
November 23	at Bucknell	Christy Mathewson–Memorial Stadium; Lewisburg, PA	L 27–28 ^{OT}	5,467	
*Non-conference game
