= 1996 Army Cadets football team =

American college football season

1996 Army Cadets football

Independence Bowl, L 32–29 vs. Auburn
- Conference: Independent

Ranking
- Coaches: No. 24
- AP: No. 25
- Record: 10–2
- Head coach: Bob Sutton (6th season)
- Offensive coordinator: Greg Gregory (8th as OC; 15th overall season)
- Offensive scheme: Triple option
- Defensive coordinator: Denny Doornbos (6th season)
- Base defense: 4–3
- Captains: Ben Kotwica; Ron Leshinski
- Home stadium: Michie Stadium

1996 NCAA Division I-A independents football records
	Conf.			Overall
Team	W		L	W		L
No. 25 Army		–		10	–	2
Navy		–		9	–	3
No. 19 Notre Dame		–		8	–	3
East Carolina		–		8	–	3
Louisiana Tech		–		6	–	5
UAB		–		5	–	6
UCF		–		5	–	6
Southwestern Louisiana		–		5	–	6
Northeast Louisiana		–		5	–	6
Arkansas State		–		4	–	7
Northern Illinois		–		1	–	10
Rankings from AP Poll

The 1996 Army Cadets football team was an American football team that represented the United States Military Academy as an independent during the 1996 NCAA Division I-A football season. In their sixth season under head coach Bob Sutton, the Cadets compiled a 10–2 record, won their first eight games of the season for the first time since 1950, were ranked in consecutive weeks in the AP Poll for the first time since 1959, and outscored their opponents by a combined total of 379 to 224. In the annual Army–Navy Game, the Cadets defeated Navy, 28–24. They also lost to Auburn, 32–29, in the 1996 Independence Bowl. This was Army's last winning season until 2010.

== Schedule ==
Date	Time	Opponent	Rank	Site	TV	Result	Attendance	Source
September 14	1:30 p.m.	Ohio		Michie Stadium; West Point, NY		W 37–20	30,500	
September 21	12:00 p.m.	Duke		Michie Stadium; West Point, NY	HTS	W 35–17	36,049	
September 28	2:00 p.m.	vs. North Texas		Texas Stadium; Irving, TX		W 27–10	20,413	
October 5	1:30 p.m.	Yale		Michie Stadium; West Point, NY		W 39–13	40,776	
October 12	1:00 p.m.	at Rutgers		Giants Stadium; East Rutherford, NJ		W 42–21	19,101	
October 19	1:30 p.m.	Tulane		Michie Stadium; West Point, NY		W 34–10	35,971	
October 26	1:00 p.m.	at Miami (OH)		Yager Stadium; Oxford, OH		W 27–7	16,543	
November 2	1:30 p.m.	Lafayette		Michie Stadium; West Point, NY		W 41–21	39,269	
November 9	3:30 p.m.	Air Force		Michie Stadium; West Point, NY (Commander-in-Chief's Trophy)	ABC	W 23–7	41,251	
November 16	6:00 p.m.	at No. 19 Syracuse	No. 22	Carrier Dome; Syracuse, NY	ESPN	L 17–42	49,257	
December 7	12:00 p.m.	vs. Navy	No. 23	Veterans Stadium; Philadelphia, PA (Army–Navy Game)	CBS	W 28–24	69,238	
December 31	3:30 p.m.	vs. Auburn	No. 24	Independence Stadium; Shreveport, LA (Independence Bowl)	ESPN	L 29–32	41,366	
Rankings from AP Poll released prior to the game; All times are in Eastern time

== Rankings ==
Ranking movements Legend: ██ Increase in ranking ██ Decrease in ranking — = Not ranked
	Week																	
Poll	Pre	1	2	3	4	5	6	7	8	9	10	11	12	13	14	15	16	Final
AP	—	—	—	—	—	—	—	—	—	—	—	—	22	—	24	23	24	25
Coaches	—		—	—	—	—	—	—	—	—	—	—	23	—	24	23	24	24

== Game summaries ==
=== Vs. Navy ===
Army Cadets vs. Navy Midshipmen

Quarter	1	2	3	4	Total
Army	3	10	12	3	28
Navy	0	21	3	0	24

at Veterans Stadium • Philadelphia, Pennsylvania

- Date: December 7
- Game time: 12:00 p.m. EDT
- Game weather: Rain
- Game attendance: 69,238
- TV announcers (CBS): Sean McDonough, Terry Donahue, and Michele Tafoya

Game information

Army

- McAda
  5/10, 116 Yds
  15 Rush, 134 Yds, TD
- Williams
  1 Rec, 43 Yds

Navy

- McCoy
  6/14, 107 Yds, TD, INT
- Nelson
  18 Rush, 74 Yds
- Heaven
  2 Rec, 67 Yds

President Bill Clinton became the first sitting U.S. president to attend game since 1974.

Scoring summary

Quarter	Time	Drive			Team	Scoring information	Score	
Quarter	Time	Plays	Yards	TOP	Team	Scoring information	ARMY	NAVY
1	0:00				Army	22-yard field goal by Parker	3	0
2	9:33				Navy	McGrew 7-yard touchdown run, Vanderhorst kick good	3	7
2	5:54				Navy	Butts 7-yard touchdown reception from McCoy, Vanderhorst kick good	3	14
2	5:14				Navy	McCoy 7-yard touchdown run, Vanderhorst kick good	3	21
2	2:39				Army	McAda 44-yard touchdown run, Parker kick good	10	21
2	0:39				Army	35-yard field goal by Parker	13	21
3	14:03				Army	Williams 81-yard touchdown run, 2-point run failed	19	21
3	5:43				Army	Perry 3-yard touchdown run, 2-point run failed	25	21
3	0:02				Navy	31-yard field goal by Vanderhorst	25	24
4	6:35				Army	20-yard field goal by Parker	28	24
"TOP" = time of possession. For other American football terms, see Glossary of American football.							28	24

=== Vs. Auburn ===
	1	2	3	4	Total
#24 Cadets	0	7	0	22	29
Tigers	10	10	12	0	32

== Roster ==
1996 Army Cadets football team roster
Players
Coaches
Offense

Pos.	#	Name	Class
OT	79	Ed Bloom	So
OT	52	Tim Booth	Sr
QB	7	Ronnie McAda	Sr
SE	82	Craig Mikolajchak	Jr
SE	5	Brad Miller	Jr
RB/FB	33	Joseph Hewitt	So
RB	49	Bobby Williams	So

Defense

Pos.	#	Name	Class
DE	92	Anthony Bianchi	Sr
CB		Tony Coaxum	Fr
CB	19	Garland Gay	Sr
LB	44	Ben Kotwica	Sr

Special teams

Pos.	#	Name	Class
K	8	Joseph Parker	Sr

Head coach

- Bob Sutton

Coordinators/assistant coaches

Legend

- (C) Team captain
- (S) Suspended
- (I) Ineligible
- Injured
- Redshirt

Roster

== Radio ==
Flagship station	Play–by–play	Color commentator	Sideline reporter	Studio host
WABC–AM 770				

Some games were broadcast on WPLJ–FM 95.5 because of broadcast conflict with the New York Yankees.
