= 1996 Navy Midshipmen football team =

American college football season

1996 Navy Midshipmen football

Aloha Bowl champion

Aloha Bowl, W 42–38 vs. California
- Conference: Independent
- Record: 9–3
- Head coach: Charlie Weatherbie (2nd season)
- Offensive coordinator: Paul Johnson (2nd season)
- Offensive scheme: Triple option
- Defensive coordinator: Dick Bumpas (2nd season)
- Base defense: 4–2–5
- MVP: Ben Fay
- Captains: Clint Bruce; Ben Fay
- Home stadium: Navy–Marine Corps Memorial Stadium

1996 NCAA Division I-A independents football records
| | Conf. | | | Overall |
| Team | W | | L | W | | L |
|---|---|---|---|---|---|---|
| No. 25 Army | | – | | 10 | – | 2 |
| Navy | | – | | 9 | – | 3 |
| No. 19 Notre Dame | | – | | 8 | – | 3 |
| East Carolina | | – | | 8 | – | 3 |
| Louisiana Tech | | – | | 6 | – | 5 |
| UAB | | – | | 5 | – | 6 |
| UCF | | – | | 5 | – | 6 |
| Southwestern Louisiana | | – | | 5 | – | 6 |
| Northeast Louisiana | | – | | 5 | – | 6 |
| Arkansas State | | – | | 4 | – | 7 |
| Northern Illinois | | – | | 1 | – | 10 |
Rankings from AP Poll

The 1996 Navy Midshipmen football team represented the United States Naval Academy (USNA) as an independent during the 1996 NCAA Division I-A football season. The team was led by second-year head coach Charlie Weatherbie.

This was the Midshipmen's first winning season since 1982, and their first bowl appearance since 1981, with their first bowl win since 1978.

== Schedule ==
| Date | Time | Opponent | Site | TV | Result | Attendance | Source |
|---|---|---|---|---|---|---|---|
| September 7 | | at Rutgers | Rutgers Stadium; Piscataway, NJ | | W 10–6 | | |
| September 21 | | SMU | Navy–Marine Corps Memorial Stadium; Annapolis, MD (rivalry) | | W 19–17 | 26,798 | |
| September 28 | | at Boston College | Alumni Stadium; Chestnut Hill, MA | | L 38–43 | 44,500 | |
| October 5 | | Duke^{†} | Navy–Marine Corps Memorial Stadium; Annapolis, MD | | W 64–27 | 31,365 | |
| October 12 | | at Air Force | Falcon Stadium; Colorado Springs, CO (Commander-in-Chief's Trophy) | | W 20–17 | | |
| October 26 | | at Wake Forest | Groves Stadium; Winston-Salem, NC | | W 47–18 | 17,307 | |
| November 2 | 8:00 a.m. | vs. Notre Dame | Croke Park; Dublin, Ireland (Emerald Isle Classic, rivalry) | CBS | L 27–54 | 38,651 | |
| November 9 | | Delaware | Navy–Marine Corps Memorial Stadium; Annapolis, MD | | W 30–14 | | |
| November 16 | | Tulane | Navy–Marine Corps Memorial Stadium; Annapolis, MD | | W 35–21 | 24,952 | |
| November 23 | 1:00 p.m. | at Georgia Tech | Bobby Dodd Stadium; Atlanta, GA | | W 36–26 | 44,415 | |
| December 7 | | vs. Army | Veterans Stadium; Philadelphia, PA (Army–Navy Game) | CBS | L 24–28 | | |
| December 25 | | vs. California | Aloha Stadium; Halawa, HI (Aloha Bowl) | ABC | W 42–38 | 30,411 | |
^{†}Homecoming

== Roster ==
1996 Navy Midshipmen football team roster
Players
Coaches
Offense

| Pos. | # | Name | Class |
|---|---|---|---|
| WR | 84 | LeBron Butts |
| QB | 8 | Ben Fay | Sr |
| WR | 11 | Astor Heaven |
| QB | 7 | Chris McCoy | Jr |
| RB | 34 | Pat McGrew | Jr |
| FB | 26 | Tim Cannada | Jr |
| FB | 5 | Omar Nelson | Sr |
| WR | 87 | Neal Plaskonos |
| WR | 20 | Cory Schemm |
| G | 66 | Mike Wahle | So |
| OT | 70 | Jeff Zimmerman | Sr |

Defense

| Pos. | # | Name | Class |
|---|---|---|---|
| LB | 51 | Clint Bruce | Sr |
| LB | 50 | Travis Cooley | Jr |

Special teams

| Pos. | # | Name | Class |
|---|---|---|---|
| K | 78 | Thomas Vanderhorst |

Head coach

- Charlie Weatherbie

Coordinators/assistant coaches

Todd Wright

Legend

- (C) Team captain
- (S) Suspended
- (I) Ineligible
- Injured
- Redshirt
