= 1996 Lafayette Leopards football team =

American college football season

1996 Lafayette Leopards football
- Conference: Patriot League
- Record: 5–5 (2–2 Patriot)
- Head coach: Bill Russo (16th season)
- Captains: B.J. Gallis; Quincy Miller
- Home stadium: Fisher Field

1996 Patriot League football standings
	Conf.			Overall
Team	W		L	W		L
Bucknell $	4	–	1	6	–	5
Colgate	3	–	2	6	–	5
Lehigh	3	–	2	5	–	6
Lafayette	2	–	2	5	–	5
Fordham	1	–	3	2	–	8
Holy Cross	1	–	4	2	–	9
$ – Conference champion

The 1996 Lafayette Leopards football team was an American football team that represented Lafayette College during the 1996 NCAA Division I-AA football season. The Leopards finished fourth in the Patriot League.

In their 16th year under head coach Bill Russo, the Leopards compiled a 5–5 record. B.J. Gallis and Quincy Miller were the team captains.

The Leopards were outscored 214 to 192. Their 2–2 conference record placed fourth in the six-team Patriot League standings.

Though 11 games were scheduled, only 10 were played. Lafayette's away game at Fordham on October 12 was canceled after a Fordham player collapsed and died during that day's pregame warmups. The teams were prepared to play the game November 27 if necessary to determine the league championship. Because neither team was in contention for first place at the scheduled end of the season, the makeup game was not played.

Lafayette played its home games at Fisher Field on College Hill in Easton, Pennsylvania.

== Schedule ==
Date	Opponent	Site	Result	Attendance	Source
September 14	Millersville*	Fisher Field; Easton, PA	W 29–17	3,011	
September 21	Northeastern*	Fisher Field; Easton, PA	L 6–36		
September 28	Cornell^{†}*	Fisher Field; Easton, PA	W 30–19	5,828	
October 5	at Harvard*	Harvard Stadium; Boston, MA	W 17–7	8,860	
October 12	at Fordham	Coffey Field; Bronx, NY	canceled		
October 19	at Columbia*	Wien Stadium; New York, NY	L 0–3	1,170	
October 26	at Colgate	Andy Kerr Stadium; Hamilton, NY	L 9–40	5,500	
November 2	at Army*	Michie Stadium; West Point, NY	L 21–41	39,269	
November 9	Bucknell	Fisher Field; Easton, PA	W 23–7		
November 16	Holy Cross	Fisher Field; Easton, PA	W 38–21	4,814	
November 23	Lehigh	Fisher Field; Easton, PA (The Rivalry)	L 19–23	13,208	
*Non-conference game; ^{†}Homecoming
