= 1996 East Carolina Pirates football team =

American college football season

1996 East Carolina Pirates football
- Conference: Independent
- Record: 8–3
- Head coach: Steve Logan (5th season)
- Offensive coordinator: Doug Martin (1st season)
- Offensive scheme: Spread
- Defensive coordinator: Paul Jette (3rd season)
- Base defense: 4–3
- Home stadium: Dowdy–Ficklen Stadium

1996 NCAA Division I-A independents football records
	Conf.			Overall
Team	W		L	W		L
No. 25 Army		–		10	–	2
Navy		–		9	–	3
No. 19 Notre Dame		–		8	–	3
East Carolina		–		8	–	3
Louisiana Tech		–		6	–	5
UAB		–		5	–	6
UCF		–		5	–	6
Southwestern Louisiana		–		5	–	6
Northeast Louisiana		–		5	–	6
Arkansas State		–		4	–	7
Northern Illinois		–		1	–	10
Rankings from AP Poll

The 1996 East Carolina Pirates football team was an American football team that represented East Carolina University as an independent during the 1996 NCAA Division I-A football season. In their fifth season under head coach Steve Logan, the team compiled a 8–3 record. The Pirates offense scored 316 points while the defense allowed 214 points.

== Schedule ==
Date	Time	Opponent	Site	TV	Result	Attendance	Source
September 7	4:00 pm	East Tennessee State	Dowdy–Ficklen Stadium; Greenville, NC		W 45–21	25,512	
September 14	12:00 pm	at West Virginia	Mountaineer Field; Morgantown, WV	ESPN Plus	L 9–10	50,129	
September 21	7:00 pm	at South Carolina	Williams–Brice Stadium; Columbia, SC	WNCT	W 23–7	79,806	
September 28	4:00 pm	UCF	Dowdy–Ficklen Stadium; Greenville, NC		W 28–7	34,121	
October 10	8:00 pm	Southern Miss	Dowdy–Ficklen Stadium; Greenville, NC	ESPN2	L 7–28	34,480	
October 19	7:00 pm	at No. 12 Miami (FL)	Miami Orange Bowl; Miami, FL	ESPN	W 31–6	31,909	
November 2	2:00 pm	Arkansas State^{†}	Dowdy–Ficklen Stadium; Greenville, NC	WNCT	W 34–16	24,890	
November 9	7:00 pm	at No. 25 Virginia Tech	Lane Stadium; Blacksburg, VA	ESPN2	L 14–35	49,128	
November 16	2:00 pm	Ohio	Dowdy–Ficklen Stadium; Greenville, NC	WNCT	W 55–45	27,321	
November 23	2:00 pm	at Memphis	Liberty Bowl; Memphis, TN	WNCT	W 20–10	25,059	
November 30	3:30 pm	vs. NC State	Ericsson Stadium; Charlotte, NC (rivalry)	ESPN2	W 50–29	66,347	
^{†}Homecoming; Rankings from AP Poll released prior to the game; All times are in Eastern time

== Roster ==
1996 East Carolina Pirates football team roster
Players
Coaches
Offense

Pos.	#	Name	Class
QB	5	Marcus Crandell	Sr

Defense

Pos.	#	Name	Class
LB	14	Brian Bentley	So
LB	53	Carlos Brown	Sr
LB	51	Marvin Burke	Sr
DE	58	Freddie Claybrooks	Fr
DL	91	Devone Claybrooks	Fr
LB	57	Roderick Coleman	So

Special teams

Pos.	#	Name	Class

Head coach

- Steve Logan

Coordinators/assistant coaches

Legend

- (C) Team captain
- (S) Suspended
- (I) Ineligible
- Injured
- Redshirt

Roster
