= 1996 Fordham Rams football team =

American college football season

1996 Fordham Rams football
- Conference: Patriot League
- Record: 2–8 (1–3 Patriot)
- Head coach: Nick Quartaro (3rd season)
- Defensive coordinator: Vince Sinagra (3rd season)
- Captains: Carl Barbera; Mark Bourke; Jim Ciarlante; Kevin Szocik
- Home stadium: Coffey Field

1996 Patriot League football standings
| | Conf. | | | Overall |
| Team | W | | L | W | | L |
|---|---|---|---|---|---|---|
| Bucknell $ | 4 | – | 1 | 6 | – | 5 |
| Colgate | 3 | – | 2 | 6 | – | 5 |
| Lehigh | 3 | – | 2 | 5 | – | 6 |
| Lafayette | 2 | – | 2 | 5 | – | 5 |
| Fordham | 1 | – | 3 | 2 | – | 8 |
| Holy Cross | 1 | – | 4 | 2 | – | 9 |
$ – Conference champion

The 1996 Fordham Rams football team was an American football team that represented Fordham University during the 1996 NCAA Division I-AA football season. Fordham finished second-to-last in the Patriot League.

In their third year under head coach Nick Quartaro, the Rams compiled a 2–8 record. Carl Barbera, Mark Bourke, Jim Ciarlante and Kevin Szocik were the team captains.

The Rams were outscored 248 to 172. Their 1–3 conference record placed fifth in the six-team Patriot League standings.

Though 11 games were scheduled, only 10 were played. Fordham's planned meeting with league opponent Lafayette on October 12 was canceled after a Fordham player collapsed and died during that day's pregame warmups. The teams were prepared to play the game November 27 if necessary to determine the league championship. Because neither team was in contention for first place at the scheduled end of the season, the makeup game was not played.

Fordham played its home games at Jack Coffey Field on the university campus in The Bronx, in New York City.

== Schedule ==
| Date | Opponent | Site | Result | Attendance | Source |
|---|---|---|---|---|---|
| September 7 | Maine* | Coffey Field; Bronx, NY | L 13–24 | 3,725 | |
| September 14 | at Lehigh | Goodman Stadium; Bethlehem, PA | L 14–20 | 6,527 | |
| September 21 | at No. 18 Villanova* | Villanova Stadium; Villanova, PA | L 10–49 | 12,357 | |
| September 28 | Columbia* | Coffey Field; Bronx, NY (rivalry) | L 10–17 | 5,713 | |
| October 5 | at Dartmouth* | Memorial Field; Hanover, NH | L 7–20 | 6,105 | |
| October 12 | Lafayette | Coffey Field; Bronx, NY | canceled | | |
| October 19 | at Brown* | Brown Stadium; Providence, RI | L 14–27 | | |
| October 26 | Georgetown* | Coffey Field; Bronx, NY | W 46–6 | | |
| November 2 | Holy Cross | Coffey Field; Bronx, NY (rivalry) | W 28–0 | 2,217 | |
| November 9 | Colgate | Coffey Field; Bronx, NY | L 13–34 | | |
| November 16 | at Bucknell | Christy Mathewson–Memorial Stadium; Lewisburg, PA | L 17–51 | 3,166 | |
*Non-conference game; Rankings from The Sports Network Poll released prior to the game

== Roster ==
1996 Fordham Rams football team roster
| Players | | | Coaches |
|---|---|---|---|
| Offense: Pos. / # / Name / Class | Defense: Pos. / # / Name / Class | Special teams: Pos. / # / Name / Class; P / 10 / Barry Cantrell / Jr | Head coach: Nick Quartaro; Coordinators/assistant coaches: Dave Patenaude (quarterbacks); Legend: (C) Team captain; (S) Suspended; (I) Ineligible; Injured; Redshirt; Roster |
