= 1996 Louisiana Tech Bulldogs football team =

American college football season

1996 Louisiana Tech Bulldogs football
- Conference: Independent
- Record: 6–5
- Head coach: Gary Crowton (1st season)
- Defensive coordinator: Pete Fredenburg (2nd season)
- Captain: None
- Home stadium: Joe Aillet Stadium

1996 NCAA Division I-A independents football records
	Conf.			Overall
Team	W		L	W		L
No. 25 Army		–		10	–	2
Navy		–		9	–	3
No. 19 Notre Dame		–		8	–	3
East Carolina		–		8	–	3
Louisiana Tech		–		6	–	5
UAB		–		5	–	6
UCF		–		5	–	6
Southwestern Louisiana		–		5	–	6
Northeast Louisiana		–		5	–	6
Arkansas State		–		4	–	7
Northern Illinois		–		1	–	10
Rankings from AP Poll

The 1996 Louisiana Tech Bulldogs football team was an American football team that represented Louisiana Tech University as an independent during the 1996 NCAA Division I-A football season. In their first year under head coach Gary Crowton, the team compiled an 6–5 record.

== Schedule ==
Date	Opponent	Site	Result	Attendance	Source
August 31	Middle Tennessee State	Joe Aillet Stadium; Ruston, LA	W 20–0	17,912	
September 7	Baylor	Independence Stadium; Shreveport, LA	L 16–24	29,469	
September 14	at Central Michigan	Kelly/Shorts Stadium; Mount Pleasant, MI	W 38–37	19,022	
September 21	at Mississippi State	Scott Field; Starkville, MS	W 38–23	33,194	
September 28	Southwestern Louisiana	Joe Aillet Stadium; Ruston, LA (rivalry)	L 31–37	20,432	
October 5	at Texas A&M	Kyle Field; College Station, TX	L 13–63	52,522	
October 12	at Arkansas	War Memorial Stadium; Little Rock, AR	L 21–38	46,341	
October 19	Toledo	Joe Aillet Stadium; Ruston, LA	W 61–20	17,052	
October 26	UAB	Joe Aillet Stadium; Ruston, LA	W 35–31	11,320	
November 2	at Northern Illinois	Huskie Stadium; DeKalb, IL	W 40–14	6,208	
November 9	at Arkansas State	Indian Stadium; Jonesboro, AR	L 38–55	9,642	
