= 1996 UAB Blazers football team =

American college football season

1996 UAB Blazers football
- Conference: Independent
- Record: 5–6
- Head coach: Watson Brown (2nd season)
- Offensive coordinator: Rick Christophel (2nd season)
- Offensive scheme: Multiple
- Defensive coordinator: Robert Henry (2nd season)
- Base defense: 4–3
- Home stadium: Legion Field

1996 NCAA Division I-A independents football records
	Conf.			Overall
Team	W		L	W		L
No. 25 Army		–		10	–	2
Navy		–		9	–	3
No. 19 Notre Dame		–		8	–	3
East Carolina		–		8	–	3
Louisiana Tech		–		6	–	5
UAB		–		5	–	6
UCF		–		5	–	6
Southwestern Louisiana		–		5	–	6
Northeast Louisiana		–		5	–	6
Arkansas State		–		4	–	7
Northern Illinois		–		1	–	10
Rankings from AP Poll

The 1996 UAB Blazers football team represented the University of Alabama at Birmingham (UAB) in the 1996 NCAA Division I-A football season, and was the sixth team fielded by the school. The Blazers' head coach was Watson Brown, who entered his second season as the UAB's head coach. They played their home games at Legion Field in Birmingham, Alabama and competed as a Division I-A Independent. The Blazers would finish their inaugural season at the I-A level with a record of five wins and six losses (5–6).

== Schedule ==
Date	Time	Opponent	Site	Result	Attendance	Source
August 31	5:30 p.m.	at No. 16 Auburn	Jordan–Hare Stadium; Auburn, AL	L 0–29	80,645	
September 7	6:00 p.m.	at Maryland	Byrd Stadium; College Park, MD	L 15–39	30,057	
September 14	6:00 p.m.	Arkansas State	Legion Field; Birmingham, AL	W 42–17	18,236	
September 21	6:00 p.m.	Jacksonville State	Legion Field; Birmingham, AL	W 24–17	19,567	
October 5	6:00 p.m.	No. 16 (I-AA) Western Kentucky	Legion Field; Birmingham, AL	W 24–0	14,107	
October 19	1:00 p.m.	Southwestern Louisiana^{†}	Legion Field; Birmingham, AL	W 39–29	16,327	
October 26	6:00 p.m.	at Louisiana Tech	Joe Aillet Stadium; Ruston, LA	L 31–35	11,320	
November 2	1:00 p.m.	at Vanderbilt	Vanderbilt Stadium; Nashville, TN	L 15–31	30,153	
November 9	1:00 p.m.	UCF	Legion Field; Birmingham, AL	L 13–35	12,500	
November 16	1:00 p.m.	Cincinnati	Legion Field; Birmingham, AL	L 14–34	15,000	
November 21	6:30 p.m.	Charleston Southern	Legion Field; Birmingham, AL	W 49–13	6,500	
^{†}Homecoming; Rankings from AP Poll released prior to the game; All times are in Central time

== Roster ==
1996 UAB Blazers football team roster
Players
Coaches
Offense

Pos.	#	Name	Class
FB	2	Keith Roland	Sr
WR	3	Marcel Rachel	Jr
RB	5	Robert Davis	Sr
WR	6	Ernest Ross	Fr
RB	7	Mark Lynch	So
QB	8	Rodney Hudson	Sr
WR	9	Omar Parker	So
QB	10	Kevin Drake	Jr
QB	11	Lee Carter	So
QB	12	Lee Jolly	Fr
TE	92	Brandon E Lloyd	Fr

Defense

Pos.	#	Name	Class
LB	1	Sean Alexander	Sr
CB	18	Dennis Stokes	Jr
CB	21	Johnny Flowers	Sr
CB	22	Dainon Sidney	Jr
DB	33	James Godfrey	Fr
LB	34	Faruq Burns	Sr
DB	35	Rodregis Brooks	Fr
LB	36	Bart Battles	Fr
LB	37	Joey Roberto	Sr
LB	38	Brent Turner	So
DB	39	Pete Smith	Fr
CB	41	Anthony Blevins	Jr
SS	43	Izell Reese	Jr
LB	44	Glenn Coleman	Jr
DE	91	Terrance Winborn	Fr
DE	93	Reginald King	So
DT	94	Terry Smith	Jr
DE	95	Wallace Rutledge	Fr
DE	96	James Bristow	Jr
LB	97	Clint Jones	Fr
DE	98	Bryan Guy	Sr
DT	99	Pernell Davis	So

Special teams

Pos.	#	Name	Class
P	13	Kevin Tatarek	Sr
K	87	Jake Arians	Fr
K	92	Lee Miller	Jr

Head coach

- Watson Brown

Coordinators/assistant coaches

- George Pugh (assistant)

Legend

- (C) Team captain
- (S) Suspended
- (I) Ineligible
- Injured
- Redshirt

Roster
Last update: 1996-12-25
