= 1996 Bucknell Bison football team =

American college football season

1996 Bucknell Bison football

Patriot League champion
- Conference: Patriot League
- Record: 6–5 (4–1 Patriot)
- Head coach: Tom Gadd (2nd season)
- Captains: George Howanitz; Rich Lemon; Brandon Little
- Home stadium: Christy Mathewson–Memorial Stadium

1996 Patriot League football standings
	Conf.			Overall
Team	W		L	W		L
Bucknell $	4	–	1	6	–	5
Colgate	3	–	2	6	–	5
Lehigh	3	–	2	5	–	6
Lafayette	2	–	2	5	–	5
Fordham	1	–	3	2	–	8
Holy Cross	1	–	4	2	–	9
$ – Conference champion

The 1996 Bucknell Bison football team was an American football team that represented Bucknell University during the 1996 NCAA Division I-AA football season. The team won the Patriot League championship, its first.

Bucknell played its home games at Christy Mathewson–Memorial Stadium on the university campus in Lewisburg, Pennsylvania.

In its second year under head coach Tom Gadd, the Bison compiled a 6–5 record. George Howanitz, Rich Lemon and Brandon Little were the team captains.

The Bison outscored opponents 234 to 223. Their 4–1 conference record topped the six-team Patriot League standings.

== Schedule ==
Date	Opponent	Site	Result	Attendance	Source
September 14	Towson State*	Christy Mathewson–Memorial Stadium; Lewisburg, PA	W 44–7	6,466	
September 21	No. 22 William & Mary*	Christy Mathewson–Memorial Stadium; Lewisburg, PA	L 0–47	5,108	
September 28	Harvard*	Christy Mathewson–Memorial Stadium; Lewisburg, PA	L 7–30	6,064	
October 5	Penn^*	Christy Mathewson–Memorial Stadium; Lewisburg, PA	L 21–30 ^{OT}	9,166	
October 12	at Yale*	Yale Bowl; New Haven, CT	L 21–23	14,502	
October 19	Princeton^{†}*	Christy Mathewson–Memorial Stadium; Lewisburg, PA	W 10–6	2,166	
October 26	at Holy Cross*	Fitton Field; Worcester, MA	W 38–7	10,671	
November 2	at Lehigh	Goodman Stadium; Bethlehem, PA	W 7–6	10,271	
November 9	at Lafayette	Fisher Field; Easton, PA	L 7–23		
November 16	Fordham	Christy Mathewson–Memorial Stadium; Lewisburg, PA	W 51–17	3,166	
November 23	Colgate	Christy Mathewson–Memorial Stadium; Lewisburg, PA	W 28–27 ^{OT}	5,467	
*Non-conference game; ^{†}Homecoming; ^ Parents Weekend; Rankings from The Sports Network Poll released prior to the game
