= 1996 UCF Golden Knights football team =

American college football season

1996 UCF Golden Knights football
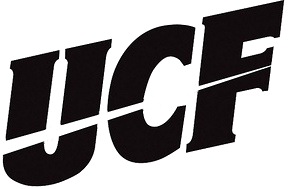
- Conference: Independent
- Record: 5–6
- Head coach: Gene McDowell (12th season)
- Offensive coordinator: Mike Kruczek (12th season)
- Defensive coordinator: Willie Martinez (2nd season)
- Home stadium: Florida Citrus Bowl

1996 NCAA Division I-A independents football records
	Conf.			Overall
Team	W		L	W		L
No. 25 Army		–		10	–	2
Navy		–		9	–	3
No. 19 Notre Dame		–		8	–	3
East Carolina		–		8	–	3
Louisiana Tech		–		6	–	5
UAB		–		5	–	6
UCF		–		5	–	6
Southwestern Louisiana		–		5	–	6
Northeast Louisiana		–		5	–	6
Arkansas State		–		4	–	7
Northern Illinois		–		1	–	10
Rankings from AP Poll

The 1996 UCF Golden Knights football season was the eighteenth season for the team and Gene McDowell's twelfth as the head coach of the Golden Knights. McDowell's 1996 team compiled a 5–6 overall record. The season marked UCF's first as a member of Division I-A, officially joining on September 1, 1996. At that time, the Knights became the first football program to play in four different NCAA divisions (III, II, I-AA and I-A).

Sophomore Quarterback Daunte Culpepper led the team to rank 16th in the nation in passing offense. This despite suffering first a sprained ankle and later a separated shoulder (non-throwing arm). The Golden Knights won their first game as a member of Division I-A, defeating William & Mary. UCF dropped six of their next seven games, however, and finished with a record of 5–6. On October 26, UCF nearly upset Georgia Tech on the road. It was the first of several near-misses against high-profile opponents over the next three seasons.

== Schedule ==
UCF's first season as an NCAA Division I-A Independent saw them play an eleven-game schedule with five games at home, and six on the road. UCF played eight games against Division I-A opponents, and three games against I-AA opponents.

Date	Opponent	Site	Result	Attendance	Source
August 29	William & Mary	Florida Citrus Bowl; Orlando, FL	W 39–33	18,013	
September 7	at South Carolina	Williams–Brice Stadium; Columbia, SC	L 14–33	76,411	
September 14	at New Mexico	University Stadium; Albuquerque, NM	L 7–17	18,317	
September 21	at Ball State	Ball State Stadium; Muncie, IN	L 10–31	11,475	
September 28	at East Carolina	Dowdy–Ficklen Stadium; Greenville, NC	L 7–28	34,121	
October 12	Samford	Florida Citrus Bowl; Orlando, FL	W 38–6	12,122	
October 19	Northeast Louisiana	Florida Citrus Bowl; Orlando, FL	L 38–39	16,293	
October 26	at Georgia Tech	Bobby Dodd Stadium; Atlanta, GA	L 20–27	43,610	
November 2	Illinois State	Florida Citrus Bowl; Orlando, FL	W 42–15	17,639	
November 9	at UAB	Legion Field; Birmingham, AL	W 35–13	12,500	
November 16	Bowling Green	Florida Citrus Bowl; Orlando, FL	W 27–19	14,112	

== Game summaries ==
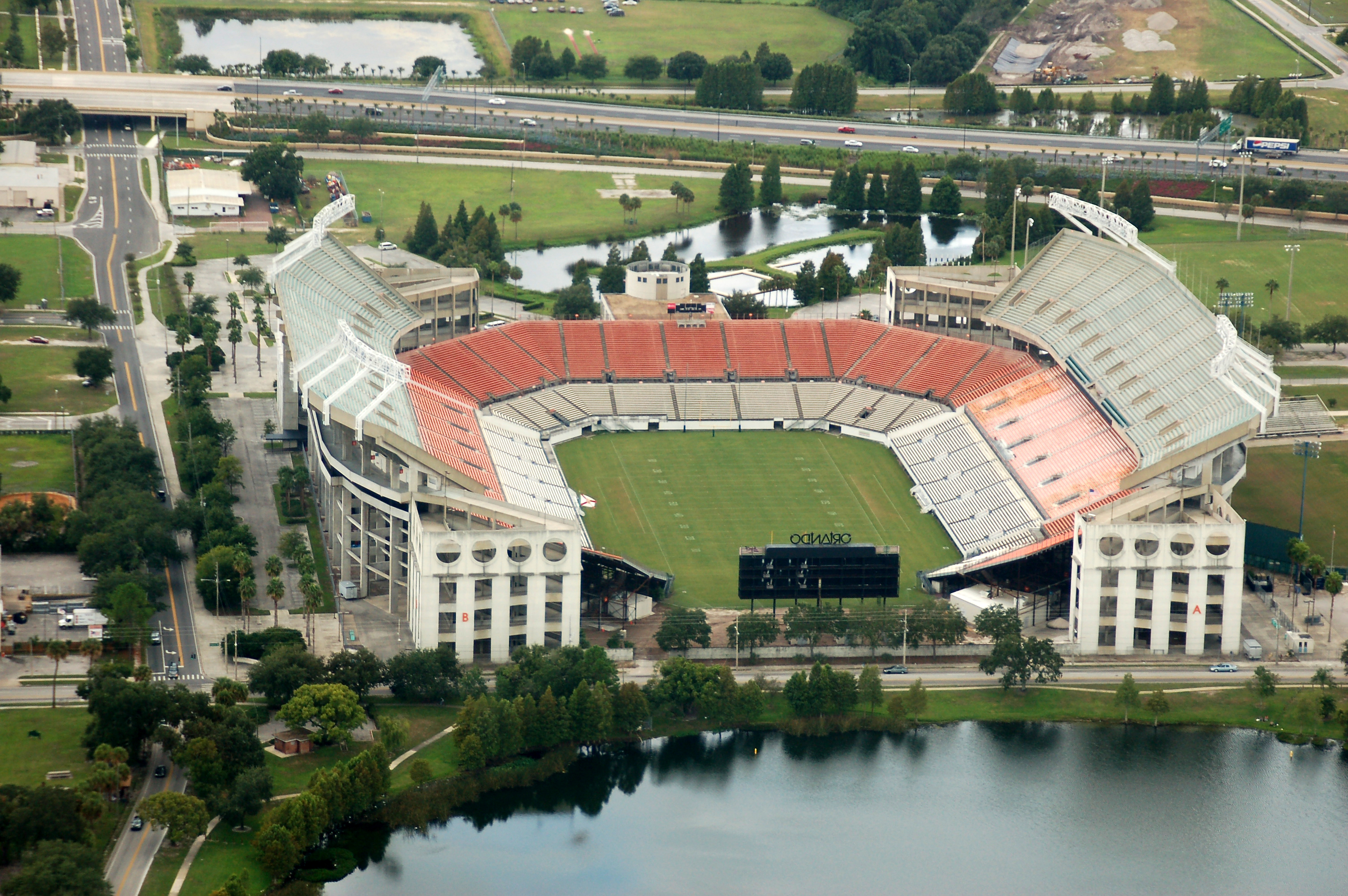
The Florida Citrus Bowl, the Knights' home field

=== August 29 – William & Mary ===
UCF made their debut as an NCAA Division I-A team at the Citrus Bowl on Thursday night against I-AA William & Mary. The Golden Knights took a 10–0 lead into halftime, but errors and miscues almost cost them the game. The Tribe scored 27 points in the third quarter to take a 27–10 lead. UCF had seven fumbles (four lost), and the defense gave up big plays, including a 70-yard touchdown pass by Mike Cook. Quarterback Daunte Culpepper led UCF on a rally, throwing for 307 yards and three touchdowns, and rushing for 87 yards. The Golden Knights scored 22 points in the fourth to take a 39–33 lead with 1:47 remaining. In the final minute, despite back-to-back turnovers, the Golden Knights held on to win their first game as a Div. I-A school.

=== September 7 – at South Carolina ===
The Golden Knights scored a touchdown on the opening drive, but the Gamecocks scored 23 unanswered points before the first quarter had ended. Quarterback Daunte Culpepper suffered a sprained ankle, and left the game in the second half. South Carolina overpowered the Golden Knights, as tailback Duce Staley rushed for 188 yards and three touchdowns. The gamecocks won by the score of 33–14.

=== September 14 – at New Mexico ===
UCF strong safety Donnell Washington scored an 80-yard interception return for a touchdown, and the Golden Knights defense played strong, giving UCF a 7–3 lead after three quarters. However, the offense struggled all night, and quarterback Daunte Culpepper re-injured his ankle. The Lobos rallied for two touchdowns in the fourth quarter, and won 17–7.

=== September 21 – at Ball State ===
On a cold, rainy afternoon, Ball State beat UCF 31–10 to give the Golden Knights their third loss in a row. Quarterback Daunte Culpepper, still suffering lingering pain from his injured ankle, brought UCF with six points in the third quarter. But in the fourth quarter, trailing 16–10, the UCF special teams broke down. The Golden Knights gave up an 80-yard punt return touchdown, followed by a blocked punt that lead to another Cardinals touchdown.

=== September 28 – at East Carolina ===
UCF lost their fourth game in a row, falling to East Carolina. The Golden Knights were shut out 14–0 in the first half, but quarterback Daunte Culpepper was able to put UCF on the board with a 54-yard touchdown pass to Mike Huff early in the third quarter. The offense continued to sputter, however, as Culpepper was sacked twice, lost a fumble, and threw three interceptions on the day. After his third interception, which led to a Pirates score, Culpepper was benched in favor of Jason Thorpe. The Golden Knights fell 28–7, and went 0–4 on their September road trip.

=== October 12 – Samford ===
After a much-needed bye week, UCF returned home to take on I-AA Samford. The Golden Knights rolled over the Bulldogs to snap their four-game losing streak. Todd Cleveland took the opening kickoff back 93 yards for a touchdown, and UCF led 7–0 just 15 seconds into the game. The Knights would never trail, as quarterback Daunte Culpepper threw two touchdown passes in the win. Mike Huff ran for a touchdown and caught a touchdown pass, while Mike Grant had a 40-yard touchdown run in the second half. Up by 29 points, Culpepper was rested in the fourth quarter, and replaced by backups Jason Thorpe and Kevin Reid. Both Thorpe and Reid had one pass attempt apiece, and both were intercepted. The Bulldogs were held scoreless in the second half, and UCF won 38–6.

=== October 19 – Northeast Louisiana ===
UCF hosted Northeast Louisiana at the Citrus Bowl, its first Division I-A opponent at home since ascending to the I-A level themselves. The Golden Knights blew an 11-point lead inside the final three minutes as the Indians took the win by a score of 39–38. In a high scoring game, quarterback Daunte Culpepper threw two touchdown passes and ran for another. With 3:01 left to play, the Golden Knights led 38–27. In just 43 seconds, quarterback Raymond Philyaw drove the Indians 65-yards for a touchdown, and trimmed the score to 38–33. The Indians recovered an onside kick, and 48 seconds later, were in the endzone again for the go-ahead score. Facing 4th & 10 at the 37, Philyaw threw a perfect pass to Marty Booker at the goal line. Trailing by one point, UCF had one last chance to drive for a potential game-winning field goal. Driving near midfield, Culpepper broke away for a 20-yard scramble, but had the ball slapped from his hand at the 47 yard line. The Indians recovered the fumble, and sealed the victory.

=== October 26 – at Georgia Tech ===
UCF gave George O'Leary and the Georgia Tech Yellow Jackets a scare, but five turnovers thwarted any chance of victory. Trailing 20-6 early in the fourth quarter, quarterback Daunte Culpepper was on the sidelines with an injured shoulder. Strong safety Donnell Washington grabbed a mid-air fumble and returned it 46 yards for a touchdown to trim the deficit to 20–13. The Knights were able to pin Georgia Tech back at their own 4 yard line with 8:02 to go. But Georgia tech responded with a 96-yard touchdown pass from Shaw to Charlie Roberts, and a 27–13 lead. UCF scored a touchdown with 40 seconds left in regulation to make the score 27–20. An onside kick attempt in the final minute failed, and the Golden Knights lost 27–20.

=== November 2 – Illinois State ===
Two UCF players, receiver Todd Cleveland and running back Mike Grant, were suspended before the game for the season, but the Golden Knights still routed Illinois State 42–15 on homecoming. UCF racked up 597 yards of offense, led by quarterback Daunte Culpepper, who threw for 260 yards and two touchdown passes. Culpepper only played in the first half, as the team elected to rest him in the second half due to his lingering shoulder injury.

=== November 9 – at UAB ===
Quarterback Daunte Culpepper has his best game of the season, completing 24 of 36 passes. He threw for 421 yards and three touchdown passes, and ran for another touchdown, as the Golden Knights won by the score of 35–13. The win was notable, as it marked UCF's first victory against a Division I-A opponent since ascending to Division I-A themselves. After falling behind 10–0 in the second quarter, the Golden Knights outscored UAB 35–3 to take complete control of the game. Culpepper's 421 passing yards was the second-most in school history.

=== November 16 – Bowling Green ===
UCF finished the season on a three-game winning streak, defeating Bowling Green 27–19 at the Citrus Bowl. UCF led 14–13 early in the third quarter, but a miscue kept the Green Falcons in the game. Windy conditions helped Bowling Green, as a punt carried for 73 yards, pinning the Golden Knights at their own 1 yard line. Quarterback Daunte Culpepper was intercepted, setting up a Cates 1-yard touchdown run, and a 19–14 lead for the Falcons. Culpepper responded with a 54-yard pass to Mark Nonsant, which set up a touchdown run by Mike Huff, and a 20–19 lead. UCF added another touchdown in the fourth quarter, after stopping the Falcons on a 4th down & 6 at the 36 yard line.

== Roster ==
1996 UCF Golden Knights football team roster
Players			Coaches
Offense: Pos. / # / Name / Class; QB / 8 / Daunte Culpepper / So	Defense: Pos. / # / Name / Class	Special teams: Pos. / # / Name / Class	Head coach: Gene McDowell; Coordinators/assistant coaches Legend: (C) Team captain; (S) Suspended; (I) Ineligible; Injured; Redshirt; Roster
