= 1996 Cornell Big Red football team =

American college football season

1996 Cornell Big Red football
- Conference: Ivy League
- Record: 4–6 (4–3 Ivy)
- Head coach: Jim Hofher (7th season)
- Captains: Steve Busch; Chad Levitt; Seth Payne; Brian Weidel
- Home stadium: Schoellkopf Field

1996 Ivy League football standings
	Conf.			Overall
Team	W		L	W		L
No. 17 Dartmouth $	7	–	0	10	–	0
Columbia	5	–	2	8	–	2
Brown	4	–	3	5	–	5
Cornell	4	–	3	4	–	6
Penn	3	–	4	5	–	5
Harvard	2	–	5	4	–	6
Princeton	2	–	5	3	–	7
Yale	1	–	6	2	–	8
$ – Conference champion; Rankings from The Sports Network poll

The 1996 Cornell Big Red football team was an American football team that represented Cornell University during the 1996 NCAA Division I-AA football season. Cornell tied for third in the Ivy League.

In its seventh season under head coach Jim Hofher, the team compiled a 4–6 record and was outscored 280 to 221. Steve Busch, Chad Levitt, Seth Payne and Brian Weidel were team captains.

Cornell's 4–3 conference record tied for third place in the Ivy League standings. The Big Red were outscored 178 to 157 by Ivy opponents.

Cornell played its home games at Schoellkopf Field in Ithaca, New York.

== Schedule ==
Date	Opponent	Site	Result	Attendance	Source
September 21	Princeton^{†}	Schoellkopf Field; Ithaca, NY	W 33–27 ^{2OT}	14,120	
September 28	at Lafayette*	Fisher Field; Easton, PA	L 19–30	5,828	
October 5	at Buffalo*	University at Buffalo Stadium; Amherst, NY	L 24–41	9,177	
October 12	at Harvard	Harvard Stadium; Boston, MA	W 20–13	8,700	
October 19	Colgate*	Schoellkopf Field; Ithaca, NY	L 21–31	5,943	
October 26	Dartmouth	Schoellkopf Field; Ithaca, NY (rivalry)	L 21–38	8,226	
November 2	Brown	Schoellkopf Field; Ithaca, NY	L 21–35	8,202	
November 9	at Yale	Yale Bowl; New Haven, CT	W 28–20	7,655	
November 16	at Columbia	Wien Stadium; New York, NY (rivalry)	L 10–24	7,055	
November 23	Penn	Schoellkopf Field; Ithaca, NY (rivalry)	W 24–21	5,223	
*Non-conference game; ^{†}Homecoming
