= 1996 Arkansas State Indians football team =

American college football season

1996 Arkansas State Indians football
- Conference: Independent
- Record: 4–7
- Head coach: John Bobo (4th season)
- Offensive coordinator: Mike Hand (3rd season)
- Defensive coordinator: Ricky Herzog (1st season)
- Home stadium: Indian Stadium

1996 NCAA Division I-A independents football records
	Conf.			Overall
Team	W		L	W		L
No. 25 Army		–		10	–	2
Navy		–		9	–	3
No. 19 Notre Dame		–		8	–	3
East Carolina		–		8	–	3
Louisiana Tech		–		6	–	5
UAB		–		5	–	6
UCF		–		5	–	6
Southwestern Louisiana		–		5	–	6
Northeast Louisiana		–		5	–	6
Arkansas State		–		4	–	7
Northern Illinois		–		1	–	10
Rankings from AP Poll

The 1996 Arkansas State Indians football team represented Arkansas State University as an independent during the 1996 NCAA Division I-A football season. Led by John Bobo in his fourth and final season as head coach, the Indians compiled a record of 4–7.

== Schedule ==
Date	Opponent	Site	Result	Attendance	Source
August 31	at No. 19 BYU	Cougar Stadium; Provo, UT	L 9–58	63,681	
September 7	Austin Peay	Indian Stadium; Jonesboro, AR	W 24–0		
September 14	at UAB	Legion Field; Birmingham, AL	L 17–42	18,236	
September 21	Northern Illinois	Indian Stadium; Jonesboro, AR	L 30–31	12,217	
October 5	Central Arkansas	Indian Stadium; Jonesboro, AR	W 17–7		
October 12	at Southwestern Louisiana	Cajun Field; Lafayette, LA	L 31–42		
October 19	Southeast Missouri State^{†}	Indian Stadium; Jonesboro, AR	W 38–9		
October 26	at Ole Miss	Vaught–Hemingway Stadium; Oxford, MS	L 21–38	28,176	
November 2	at East Carolina	Dowdy–Ficklen Stadium; Greenville, NC	L 16–34	24,890	
November 9	Louisiana Tech	Indian Stadium; Jonesboro, AR	W 55–38	9,642	
November 16	at Nevada	Mackay Stadium; Reno, NV	L 14–66	18,733	
^{†}Homecoming; Rankings from AP Poll released prior to the game

== Roster ==
1996 Arkansas State Indians football team roster
Players			Coaches
Offense 80 Chico Fletcher WR 5-6 160 Fr 62 Ben Dew OL 6-2 280: Pos. / # / Name / Class; WR / 85 / Frank Escobar / Jr	Defense 06 Denishio Blanchett SS 5-10 175 Fr. Forrest City 12 Corey Bowens LB 6-2 235 Fr. Memphis, Tenn. 53 Kevin Brazile LB 6-1 195 So: Pos. / # / Name / Class; DE / 97 / Justin Birdwell / Fr	Special teams: Pos. / # / Name / Class	Head coach: John Bobo; Coordinators/assistant coaches Legend: (C) Team captain; (S) Suspended; (I) Ineligible; Injured; Redshirt; Roster
