= Bob Sutton (American football) =

American football coach (born 1951)

Personal information
- Born: January 28, 1951 (age 75); Ypsilanti, Michigan, U.S.

Career information
- College: Eastern Michigan

Career history
- Michigan (1972–1973) Graduate assistant; Syracuse (1974) Linebackers coach; Western Michigan (1975–1976) Defensive coordinator & linebackers coach; Illinois (1977–1979) Defensive coordinator & linebackers coach; Western Michigan (1980–1981) Offensive coordinator, quarterback coach, wide receivers coach; NC State (1982) Running backs coach; Army (1983–1990) Defensive coordinator; Army (1991–1999) Head coach; New York Jets (2000–2005) Linebackers coach; New York Jets (2006–2008) Defensive coordinator; New York Jets (2009–2011) Senior defensive assistant & linebackers coach; New York Jets (2012) Assistant head coach & linebackers coach; Kansas City Chiefs (2013–2018) Defensive coordinator; Atlanta Falcons (2019–2020) Senior defensive assistant; Jacksonville Jaguars (2021–2023) Senior defensive assistant

Head coaching record
- Regular season: NCAA: 44–54–1 (.449)
- Postseason: Bowl games: 0–1 (.000)
- Career: NCAA: 44–55–1 (.445)
- Coaching profile at Pro Football Reference

Bob D. Sutton (born January 28, 1951) is an American football coach. Sutton previously was the defensive coordinator for the Kansas City Chiefs. Sutton served as the head football coach at the United States Military Academy from 1991 to 1999, compiling a record of 44–55–1.

== Coaching career ==
Sutton's first job in the coaching ranks came as a graduate assistant under Bo Schembechler at Michigan in 1972 and 1973. In 1974, he moved on to Syracuse University where he served as linebackers coach for the Orange. After just one year he began the first of two stints at Western Michigan University then onto the University of Illinois, where he was defensive coordinator and linebackers coach from 1977 to 1979. He returned to Western Michigan as offensive coordinator in 1980 and 1981. In 1982, he spent one season as running backs coach at North Carolina State University before beginning a long association with the United States Military Academy in 1983.

=== Army ===
Sutton spent eight years as an assistant coach at Army before being named the head coach in 1991. His nine-year tenure as the head football coach at Army (1991 to 1999) is third in length only to Earl "Red" Blaik and current Army coach Jeff Monken. Sutton compiled a record of 44–55–1 and guided the 1996 Army squad to a 10–2 record, an appearance in the Independence Bowl, and a top 25 finish in both major polls. For his efforts that season, Sutton was awarded the Bobby Dodd Coach of the Year Award.

=== New York Jets ===
Sutton made the transition to the NFL coaching ranks with the New York Jets in 2000, beginning his tenure with the Jets as a linebackers coach before serving as the team's defensive coordinator from 2006 to 2008, senior assistant/linebackers coach from 2009 to 2011, and as assistant head coach/linebackers in 2012.

=== Kansas City Chiefs ===
In January 2013 Sutton was named defensive coordinator for the Kansas City Chiefs under new head coach Andy Reid. Unlike other NFL defensive coordinators, Sutton was distinguished by his "cordial and cerebral demeanor" which was the "calming and refreshing opposite of the drill sergeant caricature". The Chiefs finished in the top seven in scoring defense in each of Sutton's first four seasons, ranking second in 2014.

Despite the gradual year-over-year improvement in the Chiefs' win–loss record, Sutton drew growing criticism as the defense cost them playoff games, starting when the team blew the 38–10 lead to lose 44–45 to the Indianapolis Colts in 2014, and then suffered eliminations at the hands of the Pittsburgh Steelers, Tennessee Titans, and New England Patriots in the 2016–2018 postseasons; in these latter three losses the Chiefs had home advantage and surrendered a considerable amount of rushing yards. The 2018 season was generally a success for the Chiefs, largely due to an offense led by young quarterback Patrick Mahomes who led the league in points and yards per game. However, the defense ranked 31st in yards allowed (405.5), 24th in yards per play (5.85), and 24th in points per game (26.3), and giving up an average of 40.2 points in the five losses including those to the Los Angeles Rams and Seattle Seahawks, while the only bright spot was leading the league in sacks and quarterback hurries. The Kansas City Star's Sam Mellinger noted that "The offense was a rocket ship, especially early, which meant the defense was often playing with the lead in obvious passing situations. That played to the group’s strength, which was the pass rush, and away from its weaknesses — stopping the run and quick passes". Sutton had reportedly lost the support of players and coaches who felt that his "lack of adjustments has been a non-stop frustration", so he was relieved of his duties two days after the loss to the Patriots in the AFC Championship Game, when the Chiefs defense twice failed to hold a 4th quarter lead and surrendered several 3rd and long conversions on New England's game-winning touchdown drive in overtime. The overtime drive highlighted Sutton's weaknesses that cost him his job, as the Patriots largely converted those 3rd downs on near-identical plays. Notably, CBS commentator Tony Romo was successfully able to predict the plays based on the formation, which led to even more criticism of Sutton.

The following season, under new defensive coordinator Steve Spagnuolo, Kansas City posted an identical 12–4 record despite injuries to Mahomes and several other key offensive pieces, as an improved defense gave Kansas City a more balanced team that went on to win the Super Bowl.

=== Atlanta Falcons ===
In February 2019, the Atlanta Falcons named Sutton a Senior Assistant.

=== Jacksonville Jaguars ===
Sutton became the senior defensive assistant of the Jacksonville Jaguars during the 2023 season. He, along with several other defensive staff members, were fired after the season.

== Personal life ==
Sutton earned his physical education degree from Eastern Michigan University. Sutton's time leading Army during the 1995 season were profiled in detail by John Feinstein in his 1996 book 'A Civil War', about the Army–Navy Rivalry. He and his wife, Debbie, have a son, a daughter, and three grandchildren.

== Head coaching record ==
Year	Team	Overall	Conference	Standing	Bowl/playoffs	Coaches^{#}	AP^{°}
Army Cadets / Black Knights (NCAA Division I-A independent) (1991–1997)
1991	Army	4–7					
1992	Army	5–6					
1993	Army	6–5					
1994	Army	4–7					
1995	Army	5–5–1					
1996	Army	10–2			L Independence	24	25
1997	Army	4–7					
Army Cadets / Black Knights (Conference USA) (1998–1999)
1998	Army	3–8	2–4	T–5th			
1999	Army	3–8	1–5	T–7th			
Army:		44–55–1	3–9				
Total:		44–55–1					
^{#}Rankings from final Coaches Poll.; ^{°}Rankings from final AP Poll.
