= 1996 Columbia Lions football team =

American college football season

1996 Columbia Lions football
- Conference: Ivy League
- Record: 8–2 (5–2 Ivy)
- Head coach: Ray Tellier (8th season)
- Defensive coordinator: Mike Donnelly (5th season)
- Captains: Ryan Gabriele; Randy Murff; Marcellus Wiley; Rory Wilfork
- Home stadium: Wien Stadium

1996 Ivy League football standings
| | Conf. | | | Overall |
| Team | W | | L | W | | L |
|---|---|---|---|---|---|---|
| No. 17 Dartmouth $ | 7 | – | 0 | 10 | – | 0 |
| Columbia | 5 | – | 2 | 8 | – | 2 |
| Brown | 4 | – | 3 | 5 | – | 5 |
| Cornell | 4 | – | 3 | 4 | – | 6 |
| Penn | 3 | – | 4 | 5 | – | 5 |
| Harvard | 2 | – | 5 | 4 | – | 6 |
| Princeton | 2 | – | 5 | 3 | – | 7 |
| Yale | 1 | – | 6 | 2 | – | 8 |
$ – Conference champion; Rankings from The Sports Network poll

The 1996 Columbia Lions football team was an American football team that represented Columbia University during the 1996 NCAA Division I-AA football season. Columbia finished second in the Ivy League.

In their eighth season under head coach Ray Tellier, the Lions compiled a 8–2 record and outscored opponents 181 to 159. Ryan Gabriele, Randy Murff, Marcellus Wiley and Rory Wilfork were the team captains.

Despite a 5–2 conference record that placed second in the Ivy League standings, Columbia was outscored 133 to 119 by Ivy opponents.

Columbia played its homes games at Lawrence A. Wien Stadium in Upper Manhattan, in New York City.

== Schedule ==
| Date | Opponent | Site | Result | Attendance | Source |
|---|---|---|---|---|---|
| September 21 | Harvard | Wien Stadium; New York, NY | W 20–13 ^{OT} | 5,760 | |
| September 28 | at Fordham* | Coffey Field; Bronx, NY (rivalry) | W 17–10 | 5,713 | |
| October 5 | at Holy Cross* | Fitton Field; Worcester, MA | W 42–16 | 9,349 | |
| October 12 | at Penn | Franklin Field; Philadelphia, PA | W 20–19 ^{OT} | 6,435 | |
| October 19 | Lafayette^{†}* | Wien Stadium; New York, NY | W 3–0 | 1,170 | |
| October 26 | at Yale | Yale Bowl; New Haven, CT | W 13–10 | 24,715 | |
| November 2 | Princeton^{†} | Wien Stadium; New York, NY | L 11–14 | 9,100 | |
| November 9 | at No. 25 Dartmouth | Memorial Field; Hanover, NH | L 0–40 | 5,119 | |
| November 16 | Cornell | Wien Stadium; New York, NY (rivalry) | W 24–10 | 7,055 | |
| November 23 | Brown | Wien Stadium; New York, NY | W 31–27 | 5,175 | |
*Non-conference game; ^{†}Homecoming; Rankings from The Sports Network Poll released prior to the game

== Roster ==
1996 Columbia Lions football team roster
Players
Coaches
Offense

| Pos. | # | Name | Class |
|---|---|---|---|
| TE | 83 | Billy Campbell | Fr |
| WR | 3 | Dennis Lee | Sr |
| FB | 28 | Paul Thomas | Jr |
| QB | 19 | Bobby Thomason | Jr |
| WR | 88 | Chris Wachter | Sr |

Defense

| Pos. | # | Name | Class |
|---|---|---|---|
| DE | 92 | Charlie Bettinelli | Sr |
| DE | 81 | Greg Bowman | Fr |
| DT | 63 | Brett Bryant | Sr |
| ROV | 11 | Anthony Caffiero | Jr |
| DE | 96 | Tom Nelson | Fr |
| FS | 22 | Jessie Nunn | Sr |
| DE | 85 | Juan Tabio | Fr |
| DE | 5 | Marcellus Wiley | Sr |

Special teams

| Pos. | # | Name | Class |
|---|---|---|---|
| K, P | 9 | Matt Linit | So |

Head coach

- Ray Tellier

Coordinators/assistant coaches

Legend

- (C) Team captain
- (S) Suspended
- (I) Ineligible
- Injured
- Redshirt

Roster
