= Nick Quartaro =

American football player and coach (born 1955)

Biographical details
- Born: October 5, 1955 (age 71)

Playing career
- c. 1973: Xavier
- 1975: Iowa
- Positions: Placekicker, defensive end

Coaching career (HC unless noted)
- c.1980: Hobart (assistant)
- 1981–1985: Northwestern (DB/DL/ST)
- 1986–1988: Drake
- 1989–1993: Kansas State (assistant)
- 1994–1997: Fordham
- 1998–2001: Iowa State (assistant HC / WR)
- 2002–2006: Kansas (associate HC / OC)
- 2010–2011: North Texas (assistant HC / WR)
- 2012–2016: North Texas (assistant HC / TE)

Head coaching record
- Overall: 23–39–1

Nick Quartaro (born October 5, 1955) is an American football coach and former player. He is currently the head coach for the Milano Rhinos of the Italian Football League and the Sprint Football team at Cornell University. Quartaro previously served as the assistant head coach and tight ends coach at the University of North Texas. Quartaro served as the head football coach Drake University from 1987 to 1988 and at Fordham University from 1994 to 1997.

== Coaching career ==
Quartaro has worked as an assistant coach at several colleges, including Northwestern University, Hobart College, Kansas State University under Bill Snyder, and the University of Kansas as offensive coordinator under Mark Mangino. After retiring from coaching in 2006, Quartaro became an insurance executive. He returned to coaching in 2010 at the University of North Texas.

== Head coaching record ==
Year	Team	Overall	Conference	Standing
Drake Bulldogs (NCAA Division III independent) (1987–1988)
1987	Drake	5–5		
1988	Drake	7–3		
Drake:		12–8		
Fordham Rams (Patriot League) (1994–1997)
1994	Fordham	0–11	0–5	6th
1995	Fordham	4–6–1	2–3	4th
1996	Fordham	2–8	1–3	5th
1997	Fordham	5–6	4–2	3rd
Fordham:		11–31–1	7–13	
Total:		23–39–1		
