= 1996 Yale Bulldogs football team =

American college football season

1996 Yale Bulldogs football
- Conference: Ivy League
- Record: 2–8 (1–6 Ivy)
- Head coach: Carmen Cozza (32nd season)
- Defensive coordinator: Bob Shoop (3rd season)
- Home stadium: Yale Bowl

1996 Ivy League football standings
	Conf.			Overall
Team	W		L	W		L
No. 17 Dartmouth $	7	–	0	10	–	0
Columbia	5	–	2	8	–	2
Brown	4	–	3	5	–	5
Cornell	4	–	3	4	–	6
Penn	3	–	4	5	–	5
Harvard	2	–	5	4	–	6
Princeton	2	–	5	3	–	7
Yale	1	–	6	2	–	8
$ – Conference champion; Rankings from The Sports Network poll

The 1996 Yale Bulldogs football team represented Yale University in the 1996 NCAA Division I-AA football season. The Bulldogs were led by head coach Carmen Cozza in his 32nd and final season. They played their home games at the Yale Bowl and finished in eighth place in the Ivy League with a 1–6 record, 2–8 overall.

== Schedule ==
Date	Opponent	Site	Result	Attendance	Source
September 21	at Brown	Brown Stadium; Providence, RI	W 30–0	7,304	
September 28	No. 16 Connecticut*	Yale Bowl; New Haven, CT	L 6–42	27,624	
October 5	at Army*	Michie Stadium; West Point, NY	L 13–39	40,776	
October 12	Bucknell*	Yale Bowl; New Haven, CT	W 23–21	14,502	
October 19	at Dartmouth	Memorial Field; Hanover, NH	L 6–40	10,119	
October 26	Columbia	Yale Bowl; New Haven, CT	L 10–13	24,715	
November 2	at Penn	Franklin Field; Philadelphia, PA	L 3–20	19,203	
November 9	Cornell	Yale Bowl; New Haven, CT	L 20–28	7,655	
November 16	Princeton	Yale Bowl; New Haven, CT (rivalry)	L 13–17	29,469	
November 23	at Harvard	Harvard Stadium; Boston, MA (rivalry)	L 21–26	24,470	
*Non-conference game; Rankings from The Sports Network Poll released prior to the game

== Roster ==
1996 Yale Bulldogs football team roster
Players
Coaches
Offense

Pos.	#	Name	Class
WR	4	Heath Ackley
QB	6	Blake Kendall
WR	7	Kevin Pardue
QB	8	Kris Barber
QB	10	Benjimin Steinberg
RB	21	Jeremy Garelick
WR	22	Nate Stoner
WR	23	Clint Rodriguez
WR	33	Andrew Samocki
OL	57	Matt Blodgett
C	58	Joe Montesano
OL	59	Mike Finnegan
OL	60	Mark Hausman
OT	62	Marek Rubin
C	66	Jack Hill
OL	77	Tsali Ricketson
OL	78	Allan McCall
TE	80	Joe Pilch
WR	81	Mike Potkay
TE	83	Brian Schraf
TE	84	Joe Leith
WR	85	Ryan Krzykowski
TE	86	Bill Sprouse

Defense

Pos.	#	Name	Class
DB	2	Leroy Garcia
LB	3	Kevin Scott
LB	9	Todd Scott
DB	11	James Paci
DB	16	Peter Calamari
DB	18	Matt O'Donnell
DB	19	Chad Miller
DB	20	Scott Yaeker
LB	35	Frank Giardina
LB	36	Bryan Whalen
LB	37	Ben Teal
DB	38	Kevin O'Callahan
LB	39	Scott Benton
LB	40	Tony Kim

Special teams

Pos.	#	Name	Class
PK	1	John Lafferty

Head coach

- Carmen Cozza

Coordinators/assistant coaches

Legend

- (C) Team captain
- (S) Suspended
- (I) Ineligible
- Injured
- Redshirt

Roster
