= Pete Chryplewicz =

American football player (born 1974)

No. 81
- Position: Tight end

Personal information
- Born: April 27, 1974 (age 52); Detroit, Michigan, U.S.
- Listed height: 6 ft 5 in (1.96 m)
- Listed weight: 253 lb (115 kg)

Career information
- High school: Sterling Heights Stevenson (Sterling Heights, Michigan)
- College: Notre Dame
- NFL draft: 1997: 5th round, 135th overall pick

Career history
- Detroit Lions (1997–1999); Oakland Raiders (2001)*
- * Offseason or practice squad member only

Career NFL statistics
- Receptions: 9
- Receiving yards: 65
- Touchdowns: 3
- Stats at Pro Football Reference

Pete Chryplewicz (born April 27, 1974) is an American former professional football player who was a tight end for the Detroit Lions of the National Football League (NFL). He played college football for the Notre Dame Fighting Irish.

== Early life ==
Chryplewicz attended high school at Sterling Heights Stevenson High School in Sterling Heights, Michigan. He was named Michigan's top high school football recruit in 1991.

Chryplewicz was part of the inaugural Hall of Fame class for Stevenson High School. He was inducted in a ceremony in September 2023.

== College career ==
Chryplewicz played for the University of Notre Dame, where he had 48 catches and five touchdowns over five seasons. He sat out the 1994 season with a broken wrist, which allowed him the fifth season of eligibility. He was a named an honorable mention to the 1996 College Football All-America Team.

== Professional career ==
Chryplewicz was selected by the Detroit Lions in the fifth round (135th overall) of the 1997 NFL draft. He played three seasons with the Lions, recording nine catches and three touchdowns.

== Personal ==
Chryplewicz is fluent in Polish. He now works in manufacturing sales.
