= Mitch Jacoby =

American football player (born 1973)

No. 89, 46, 85
- Position: Tight end

Personal information
- Born: December 8, 1973 (age 52); Port Washington, Wisconsin, U.S.
- Listed height: 6 ft 4 in (1.93 m)
- Listed weight: 260 lb (118 kg)

Career information
- High school: Ozaukee (Fredonia, Wisconsin)
- College: Northern Illinois
- NFL draft: 1997: undrafted

Career history
- St. Louis Rams (1997–1998); Kansas City Chiefs (1999)

Career NFL statistics
- Receptions: 3
- Receiving yards: 16
- Stats at Pro Football Reference

Mitchel Ray Jacoby (born December 8, 1973) is an American former professional football player who was a tight end for three seasons in the National Football League (NFL). He played college football for the Northern Illinois Huskies. Jacoby played in the NFL for two seasons with the St. Louis Rams before playing his final season with the Kansas City Chiefs.
