= Robert Farmer (American football) =

American football player (born 1974)

Profile
- Position: Running back

Personal information
- Born: March 4, 1974 (age 52); Lincoln, Nebraska, U.S.
- Listed height: 5 ft 11 in (1.80 m)
- Listed weight: 217 lb (98 kg)

Career information
- College: Notre Dame
- NFL draft: 1997: undrafted

Career history
- New York Jets (1997–1999)
- Stats at Pro Football Reference

Robert Farmer (born March 4, 1974) is an American former professional football running back in the National Football League (NFL) who played for the New York Jets. He played college football for the Notre Dame Fighting Irish.
