= Charles Talley =

Profile
- Position: Running back

Personal information
- Born: c. 1975; Pontiac, Michigan, U.S.
- Listed height: 6 ft 0 in (1.83 m)
- Listed weight: 229 lb (104 kg)

Career information
- High school: Pontiac Northern (MI)
- College: Northern Illinois (1993–1996)

Career history
- Dallas Cowboys (1997)*; England Monarchs (1998)
- * Offseason or practice squad member only

Charles Talley (born c. 1975) is a former American football running back for the Northern Illinois University Huskies football team from 1993 to 1996. Talley grew up in Pontiac, Michigan, and attended Pontiac Northern High School. During the 1995 season, he talled 1,540 rushing yards, an average of 140.0 yards per game and 5.4 yards per carry. His 1995 tally included a career-high 252 yards against Arkansas State and a 146-yard game against No. 3 Florida, leading Gators coach Steve Spurrier to say: "Talley is an excellent back. He's strong, tough, and we could not tackle him. He made a lot of guys miss him." He also gained 1,008 rushing yards in 1996, including 208 yards against Oregon State, and concluded his Northern Illinois career with 3,155 rushing yards. After his college career, Talley signed as a free agent with the Dallas Cowboys, but was released before the regular season. The played with the England Monarchs in the NFL Europe in 1998.

== See also ==
- 1995 NCAA Division I-A football season#Rushing
