= 1996 Independence Bowl =

1996 Poulan/Weed Eater Independence Bowl
Army Cadets	Auburn Tigers
(10–1)	(7–4)
Independent	SEC
29	32
Head coach: Bob Sutton	Head coach: Terry Bowden
AP / Coaches / BA; 24 / 24 / 24
	1	2	3	4	Total
Army	0	7	0	22	29
Auburn	10	10	12	0	32
- Date: December 31, 1996
- Season: 1996
- Stadium: Independence Stadium
- Location: Shreveport, Louisiana
- Referee: Jim Fogltance (Pac-10)
- Attendance: 41,366

United States TV coverage
- Network: ESPN
- Announcers: Craig Bolerjack (Play by Play); Rod Gilmore (Analyst); Merril Hoge (Sideline)

The 1996 Independence Bowl was a post-season American college football bowl game at Independence Stadium in Shreveport, Louisiana between the Army Cadets and the Auburn Tigers on December 31, 1996. The game was the final contest of the 1996 NCAA Division I-A football season for both teams, and ended in a 32–29 victory for Auburn, after Jay Parker's 27-yard field goal went wide right.}

== Scoring summary ==
First Quarter

- Auburn: Holmes 31-yard field goal
- Auburn: Goodson 30-yard touchdown pass from Craig (Holmes kick)

Second Quarter

- Auburn: Gosha 7-yard touchdown pass from Craig, (Holmes kick)
- Auburn: Holmes 49-yard field goal
- Army: Williams 3-yard touchdown run, (Parker kick)

Third Quarter

- Auburn: Craig 33-yard touchdown run
- Auburn: Williams 18-yard touchdown run

Fourth Quarter

- Army: Perry 12-yard touchdown run, (Parker kick)
- Army: B. Williams 1-yard touchdown run, (Parker kick)
- Army: Richardson 30-yard touchdown pass from McAda (Williams run)
