= Palmer Stadium =

Stadium in Princeton, NJ, USA

Coordinates: 40.345755°N 74.65003°W

Palmer Memorial Stadium
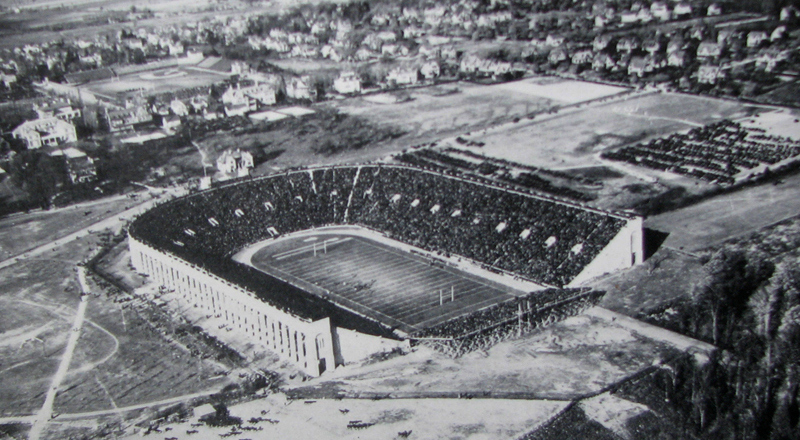
- Interactive map of Palmer Memorial Stadium
- Location: Princeton, NJ
- Owner: Princeton University
- Operator: Princeton University
- Capacity: 42,000
- Surface: Natural Grass

Construction
- Groundbreaking: June, 1914
- Opened: October 24, 1914
- Closed: November 23, 1996
- Demolished: Winter, 1997
- Architect: Henry J. Hardenburgh

Tenants
- Princeton Tigers football, Princeton Tigers track and field (1914–1996)

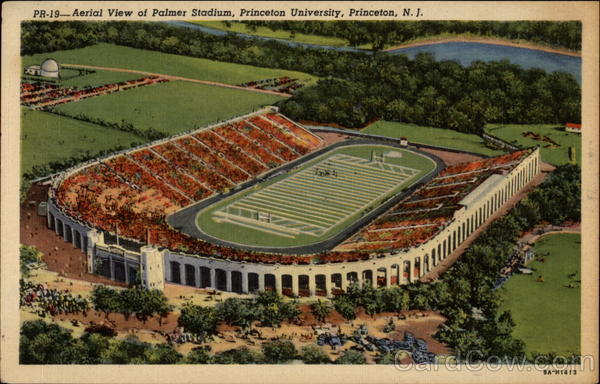
A souvenir postcard of Palmer Stadium in 1914.

The Palmer Memorial Stadium was a stadium in Princeton, New Jersey, United States, owned operated by Princeton University. It served as the home venue for Princeton Tigers football team as well as Princeton's track and field team. The stadium was opened on October 24, 1914 with the 1914 Princeton Tigers football team's game against Dartmouth, and held 45,750 people at its peak. It closed in 1996 with the 1996 Princeton Tigers football team's season finale. Princeton Stadium was built on the site, albeit pushed slightly further north, in 1997.

The building was named for Stephen S. Palmer, a trustee of the university, by his son, Edgar Palmer III. Like Harvard Stadium, it was horseshoe-shaped (which was modeled after the Greek Olympic Stadium), but was wider, including a full-sized track (around the football field). It opened to the south (facing Lake Carnegie) and the grand main entrance was at the north.

Palmer Stadium hosted the New York Giants of the National Football League (NFL) for one exhibition game per season from 1965 to 1975, the first ten games against the Philadelphia Eagles and then the Pittsburgh Steelers in 1975. It hosted the championship game of the 1981 NCAA Division I men's lacrosse tournament. From 1936 to its closing, the track's long-jump record was held by Jesse Owens.
