= Minnesota Golden Gophers football statistical leaders =

The Minnesota Golden Gophers football statistical leaders are individual statistical leaders of the Minnesota Golden Gophers football program in various categories, including passing, rushing, receiving, total offense, defensive stats, and kicking. Within those areas, the lists identify single-game, single-season, and career leaders. The Golden Gophers represent the University of Minnesota in the NCAA's Big Ten Conference.

Although Minnesota began competing in intercollegiate football in 1882, the school's official record book considers the "modern era" to have begun in 1945. Records from before this year are often incomplete and inconsistent, and they are sometimes not included in these lists.

These lists are dominated by more recent players for several reasons:

- Since 1945, seasons have increased from 10 games to 11 and then 12 games in length.
- The NCAA didn't allow freshmen to play varsity football until 1972 (with the exception of the World War II years), allowing players to have four-year careers.
- Bowl games only began counting toward single-season and career statistics in 2002. The Gophers have played in 12 bowl games since then, giving recent players an extra game to accumulate statistics.

These lists are updated through the 2025 season.

== Passing ==
=== Passing yards ===
Career
Rank	Player	Yards	Years
1	Adam Weber	10,917	2007 2008 2009 2010
2	Tanner Morgan	9,454	2018 2019 2020 2021 2022
3	Bryan Cupito	7,446	2003 2004 2005 2006
4	Mitch Leidner	7,287	2013 2014 2015 2016
5	Cory Sauter	6,834	1994 1995 1996 1997
6	Asad Abdul-Khaliq	6,660	2000 2001 2002 2003
7	Marquel Fleetwood	5,279	1989 1990 1991 1992
8	Rickey Foggie	4,903	1984 1985 1986 1987
9	Mike Hohensee	4,792	1981 1982
10	Tim Schade	3,986	1993 1994

Single season
Rank	Player	Yards	Year
1	Tanner Morgan	3,253	2019
2	Adam Weber	2,895	2007
3	Max Brosmer	2,828	2024
4	Bryan Cupito	2,819	2006
5	Adam Weber	2,761	2008
6	Mitch Leidner	2,701	2015
7	Adam Weber	2,679	2010
8	Cory Sauter	2,600	1995
9	Adam Weber	2,582	2009
10	Cory Sauter	2,578	1996

Single game
Rank	Player	Yards	Year	Opponent
1	Tim Schade	478	1993	Penn State
2	Mike Hohensee	444	1981	Ohio State
3	Adam Weber	416	2009	Michigan State
4	Cory Sauter	404	1995	Michigan State
5	Scott Eckers	402	1993	Purdue
6	Cory Sauter	397	1996	Ball State
7	Bryan Cupito	396	2005	Ohio State
	Tanner Morgan	396	2019	Purdue
9	Tim Schade	394	1994	Michigan
10	Asad Abdul-Khaliq	388	2003	Iowa

=== Passing touchdowns ===
Career
Rank	Player	TDs	Years
1	Adam Weber	72	2007 2008 2009 2010
2	Tanner Morgan	65	2018 2019 2020 2021 2022
3	Asad Abdul-Khaliq	55	2000 2001 2002 2003
	Bryan Cupito	55	2003 2004 2005 2006
5	Cory Sauter	40	1994 1995 1996 1997
6	Mitch Leidner	36	2013 2014 2015 2016
7	Rickey Foggie	33	1984 1985 1986 1987
	Mike Hohensee	33	1981 1982
9	Billy Cockerham	29	1996 1997 1998 1999
10	Drake Lindsey	27	2024 2025 2026
11	Tony Dungy	25	1973 1974 1975 1976

Single season
Rank	Player	TDs	Year
1	Tanner Morgan	30	2019
2	Adam Weber	24	2007
3	Bryan Cupito	22	2006
4	Mike Hohensee	20	1981
	Adam Weber	20	2010
6	Asad Abdul-Khaliq	19	2002
	Bryan Cupito	19	2005
8	Cory Sauter	18	1995
	Max Brosmer	18	2024
	Drake Lindsey	18	2025

Single game
Rank	Player	TDs	Year	Opponent
1	Scott Eckers	6	1993	Purdue
2	Mike Hohensee	5	1981	Oregon State
	Mike Hohensee	5	1981	Ohio State
	Adam Weber	5	2007	Northwestern
	Adam Weber	5	2009	Michigan State

== Rushing ==
=== Rushing yards ===
Career
Rank	Player	Yards	Years
1	Mohamed Ibrahim	4,668	2018 2019 2020 2021 2022
2	Darrell Thompson	4,518	1986 1987 1988 1989
3	Rodney Smith	4,125	2015 2016 2017 2018 2019
4	Laurence Maroney	3,933	2003 2004 2005
5	Thomas Hamner	3,810	1996 1997 1998 1999
6	Marion Barber III	3,276	2001 2002 2003 2004
7	Chris Darkins	3,235	1992 1993 1994 1995
8	Marion Barber, Jr.	3,087	1977 1978 1979 1980
9	David Cobb	2,896	2011 2012 2013 2014
10	Darius Taylor	2,455	2023 2024 2025

Single season
Rank	Player	Yards	Year
1	Mohamed Ibrahim	1,665	2022
2	David Cobb	1,629	2014
3	Laurence Maroney	1,464	2005
4	Chris Darkins	1,443	1994
5	Thomas Hamner	1,426	1999
6	Laurence Maroney	1,348	2004
7	Terry Jackson II	1,317	2002
8	Amir Pinnix	1,272	2006
9	Marion Barber III	1,269	2004
10	Darrell Thompson	1,240	1986

Single game
Rank	Player	Yards	Year	Opponent
1	Chris Darkins	294	1995	Purdue
2	Clarence Schutte	282	1924	Illinois
3	Kent Kitzmann	266	1977	Michigan
4	Mohamed Ibrahim	263	2022	Iowa
5	Laurence Maroney	258	2005	Wisconsin
6	Tellis Redmon	246	2000	N.C. State
7	Terry Jackson II	239	2002	Northwestern
8	Terry Jackson II	238	2002	Michigan State
9	Chris Darkins	234	1994	Purdue
10	Marion Barber, Jr.	233	1978	Illinois

=== Rushing touchdowns ===
Career
Rank	Player	TDs	Years
1	Mohamed Ibrahim	53	2018 2019 2020 2021 2022
2	Darrell Thompson	40	1986 1987 1988 1989
3	Marion Barber III	35	2001 2002 2003 2004
4	Marion Barber, Jr.	33	1977 1978 1979 1980
	Mitch Leidner	33	2013 2014 2015 2016
6	Laurence Maroney	32	2003 2004 2005
7	Rodney Smith	29	2015 2016 2017 2018 2019
8	Rickey Foggie	24	1984 1985 1986 1987
	Thomas Tapeh	24	2000 2001 2002 2003
10	Herb Joesting	23	1925 1926 1927

Single season
Rank	Player	TDs	Year
1	Mohamed Ibrahim	20	2022
2	Gary Russell	18	2005
3	Marion Barber III	17	2003
4	Rodney Smith	16	2016
5	Mohamed Ibrahim	15	2020
6	Jim Perkins	13	1976
	Darrell Thompson	13	1987
	David Cobb	13	2014
9	Marion Barber, Jr.	12	1979
	Laurence Maroney	12	2004

Single game
Rank	Player	TDs	Year	Opponent
1	Curtis Wilson	4	1967	Indiana
	Jim Carter	4	1969	Iowa
	John King	4	1972	Iowa
	Darrell Thompson	4	1986	Bowling Green
	Marion Barber III	4	2003	Ohio
	Mitch Leidner	4	2013	San Jose State
	Mohamed Ibrahim	4	2020	Maryland
	Mohamed Ibrahim	4	2020	Illinois

== Receiving ==
=== Receptions ===
Career
Rank	Player	Rec	Years
1	Eric Decker	227	2006 2007 2008 2009
2	Tyler Johnson	213	2016 2017 2018 2019
3	Daniel Jackson	208	2020 2021 2022 2023 2024
4	Ron Johnson	198	1998 1999 2000 2001
5	Tutu Atwell	171	1994 1995 1996 1997
6	Ernie Wheelwright	159	2004 2005 2006 2007
7	Rashod Bateman	147	2018 2019 2020
8	Ryan Thelwell	136	1994 1995 1996
9	Chuck Rios	132	1990 1991 1993 1994
	Luke Leverson	132	1996 1997 1998 1999

Single season
Rank	Player	Rec	Year
1	Tyler Johnson	86	2019
2	Eric Decker	84	2008
3	Tyler Johnson	78	2018
4	Daniel Jackson	75	2024
5	K. J. Maye	73	2015
6	Eric Decker	67	2007
7	Ernie Wheelwright	66	2007
	Drew Wolitarsky	66	2016
9	Tutu Atwell	62	1996
10	Omar Douglas	61	1992
	Ron Johnson	61	2000

Single game
Rank	Player	Rec	Year	Opponent
1	Aaron Osterman	13	1994	Michigan
	Eric Decker	13	2008	Indiana
3	Glenn Bourquin	12	1979	Michigan
	Chester Cooper	12	1981	Ohio State
	Alan Reid	12	1982	Indiana
	Tutu Atwell	12	1996	Purdue
	Luke Leverson	12	1998	Ohio State
	Eric Decker	12	2007	Florida Atlantic
	Tyler Johnson	12	2019	Auburn

=== Receiving yards ===
Career
Rank	Player	Yards	Years
1	Tyler Johnson	3,305	2016 2017 2018 2019
2	Eric Decker	3,119	2006 2007 2008 2009
3	Ron Johnson	2,989	1998 1999 2000 2001
4	Daniel Jackson	2,685	2020 2021 2022 2023 2024
5	Tutu Atwell	2,640	1994 1995 1996 1997
6	Ernie Wheelwright	2,434	2004 2005 2006 2007
7	Rashod Bateman	2,395	2018 2019 2020
8	Ryan Thelwell	2,232	1994 1995 1996
9	Chris Autman-Bell	2,058	2018 2019 2020 2021 2022 2023
10	Jared Ellerson	2,054	2002 2003 2004 2005

Single season
Rank	Player	Yards	Year
1	Tyler Johnson	1,318	2019
2	Rashod Bateman	1,219	2019
3	Tyler Johnson	1,169	2018
4	Ron Johnson	1,125	2000
5	Eric Decker	1,074	2008
6	Ryan Thelwell	1,051	1996
7	Chester Cooper	1,012	1981
8	Tutu Atwell	924	1997
9	Jared Ellerson	909	2003
	Eric Decker	909	2007

Single game
Rank	Player	Yards	Year	Opponent
1	Ryan Thelwell	228	1996	Ball State
2	Tyler Johnson	204	2019	Auburn
3	Rashod Bateman	203	2019	Penn State
4	Omar Douglas	193	1993	Penn State
5	Eric Decker	190	2008	Indiana
6	Jared Ellerson	189	2003	Northwestern
7	Aaron Osterman	187	1994	Michigan
8	Dwayne McMullen	186	1984	Northwestern
9	Tyler Johnson	184	2018	Nebraska
10	Eric Decker	183	2009	Syracuse

=== Receiving touchdowns ===
Career
Rank	Player	TDs	Years
1	Tyler Johnson	33	2016 2017 2018 2019
2	Ron Johnson	31	1998 1999 2000 2001
3	Ernie Wheelwright	26	2004 2005 2006 2007
4	Eric Decker	24	2006 2007 2008 2009
5	Rashod Bateman	19	2018 2019 2020
6	Daniel Jackson	18	2020 2021 2022 2023 2024
7	Tutu Atwell	17	1994 1995 1996 1997
8	Dwayne McMullen	15	1981 1982 1983 1984
	Ben Utecht	15	2000 2001 2002 2003
	Jared Ellerson	15	2002 2003 2004 2005
	Da'Jon McKnight	15	2008 2009 2010 2011

Single season
Rank	Player	TDs	Year
1	Tyler Johnson	13	2019
2	Tyler Johnson	12	2018
3	Omar Douglas	11	1993
	Ron Johnson	11	2000
	Rashod Bateman	11	2019
6	Da'Jon McKnight	10	2010
7	Luke Leverson	9	1998
	Ron Johnson	9	2001
	Logan Payne	9	2006
	Eric Decker	9	2007
	Ernie Wheelwright	9	2007

Single game
Rank	Player	TDs	Year	Opponent
1	Omar Douglas	5	1993	Purdue
2	Logan Payne	4	2006	Temple

== Total offense ==
Total offense is the sum of passing and rushing statistics. It does not include receiving or returns.

=== Total offense yards ===
Career
Rank	Player	Yards	Years
1	Adam Weber	11,790	2007 2008 2009 2010
2	Tanner Morgan	9,459	2018 2019 2020 2021 2022
3	Mitch Leidner	8,782	2013 2014 2015 2016
4	Asad Abdul-Khaliq	7,818	2000 2001 2002 2003
5	Bryan Cupito	7,449	2003 2004 2005 2006
6	Rickey Foggie	7,312	1984 1985 1986 1987
7	Cory Sauter	6,608	1994 1995 1996 1997
8	Marquel Fleetwood	6,154	1989 1990 1991 1992
9	Mike Hohensee	4,855	1981 1982
10	Billy Cockerham	4,763	1996 1997 1998 1999

Single season
Rank	Player	Yards	Year
1	Adam Weber	3,512	2007
2	Tanner Morgan	3,196	2019
3	Adam Weber	2,994	2008
4	Mitch Leidner	2,971	2015
5	Billy Cockerham	2,922	1999
6	Adam Weber	2,835	2010
7	Max Brosmer	2,792	2024
8	Asad Abdul-Khaliq	2,771	2003
9	Bryan Cupito	2,750	2006
10	Bryan Cupito	2,560	2005

Single game
Rank	Player	Yards	Year	Opponent
1	Tim Schade	536	1993	Penn State
2	Adam Weber	439	2007	Wisconsin
3	Adam Weber	430	2007	Northwestern
4	Cory Sauter	425	1997	Houston
5	Mike Hohensee	423	1981	Ohio State
6	Scott Eckers	421	1993	Purdue
7	Asad Abdul-Khaliq	417	2003	Michigan State
8	Adam Weber	411	2009	Michigan State
9	Asad Abdul-Khaliq	410	2003	Iowa
10	Bryan Cupito	398	2005	Ohio State

=== Total touchdowns ===
Career
Rank	Player	TDs	Years
1	Adam Weber	82	2007 2008 2009 2010
2	Tanner Morgan	73	2018 2019 2020 2021 2022
3	Asad Abdul-Khaliq	71	2000 2001 2002 2003
4	Mitch Leidner	69	2013 2014 2015 2016
5	Rickey Foggie	59	1984 1985 1986 1987
6	Bryan Cupito	55	2003 2004 2005 2006
7	Mohamed Ibrahim	53	2018 2019 2020 2021 2022
8	Cory Sauter	48	1994 1995 1996 1997
9	Darrell Thompson	42	1986 1987 1988 1989
10	Tony Dungy	41	1973 1974 1975 1976
	Billy Cockerham	41	1996 1997 1998 1999

Single season
Rank	Player	TDs	Year
1	Tanner Morgan	31	2019
2	Adam Weber	29	2007
3	Billy Cockerham	25	1999
4	Asad Abdul-Khaliq	24	2002
5	Mike Hohensee	23	1981
	Max Brosmer	23	2024
7	Bryan Cupito	22	2006
	Drake Lindsey	22	2025
9	Asad Abdul-Khaliq	21	2003
	Mitch Leidner	21	2014

== Defense ==
=== Interceptions ===
Career
Rank	Player	Ints	Years
1	Tyler Nubin	13	2019 2020 2021 2022 2023
2	Jeff Wright	12	1968 1969 1970
	Sean Lumpkin	12	1988 1989 1990 1991
4	Tom Sakal	11	1965 1966 1967
	Walter Bowser	11	1969 1970
	Keith Edwards	11	1977 1978 1979
7	Kyle Theret	10	2007 2008 2009 2010
	Briean Boddy-Calhoun	10	2013 2014 2015
9	Sandy Stephens	9	1959 1960 1961
	Rick Withus	9	1979 1980 1981 1982
	Frank Jackson	9	1987 1988 1989 1990
	Rodney Heath	9	1993 1994 1995 1996
	Antoine Winfield Jr.	9	2016 2017 2018 2019

Single season
Rank	Player	Ints	Year
1	Jeff Wright	7	1970
	Antoine Winfield Jr.	7	2019
3	Walter Bowser	6	1970
	John Nestor	6	2025
5	Bill Munsey	5	1960
	Walter Bowser	5	1969
	Mike White	5	1970
	Fred Foggie	5	1989
	Sean Lumpkin	5	1991
	Rodney Heath	5	1995
	Briean Boddy-Calhoun	5	2014
	Tyler Nubin	5	2023
	Koi Perich	5	2024

Single game
Rank	Player	Ints	Year	Opponent
1	Dick Anonsen	3	1949	Wisconsin
	Shorty Cochran	3	1955	Purdue
	Sandy Stephens	3	1960	Wisconsin
	Noel Jenke	3	1967	Wisconsin
	Walter Bowser	3	1969	Iowa
	Mike White	3	1970	Ohio
	Jeff Wright	3	1970	Michigan State

=== Tackles ===
Career
Rank	Player	Tackles	Years
1	Tyrone Carter	528	1996 1997 1998 1999
2	Pete Najarian	482	1982 1983 1984 1985
3	Bill Light	395	1969 1970 1971
4	Parc Williams	351	1995 1996 1997 1998
5	Russ Heath	329	1990 1991 1992 1993
6	Steve Stewart	325	1974 1975 1976 1977
7	Bruce Holmes	323	1983 1984 1985 1986
8	Joel Staats	318	1988 1989 1990 1991
9	Justin Conzemius	317	1992 1993 1994 1995
10	Glenn Howard	308	1978 1979 1980 1981

Single season
Rank	Player	Tackles	Year
1	Bill Light	172	1970
2	Jon Leverenz	162	1987
3	Tyrone Carter	158	1998
4	Jack Brewer	155	2001
5	George Washington	154	1975
6	Pete Najarian	144	1984
	Tyrone Carter	144	1999
8	Tyrone Carter	143	1997
9	Bruce Holmes	139	1985
10	Pete Najarian	137	1985

Single game
Rank	Player	Tackles	Year	Opponent
1	Bill Light	32	1970	Iowa
2	Bill Light	29	1969	Indiana
3	Pete Najarian	26	1983	Nebraska
	Pete Najarian	26	1984	Purdue
5	Ron King	25	1969	Michigan
6	Wayne King	24	1968	Iowa
7	Tim Wheeler	23	1966	Kansas
	Ollie Bakken	23	1973	Ohio State
	George Washington	23	1975	Illinois
	Pete Najarian	23	1985	Oklahoma

=== Sacks ===
Career
Rank	Player	Sacks	Years
1	Karon Riley	29.0	1999 2000
2	Lamanzer Williams	23.5	1994 1995 1996 1997
3	Carter Coughlin	22.5	2016 2017 2018 2019
4	Ben Mezera	22.0	1997 1998 1999 2000
5	Willie VanDeSteeg	21.5	2005 2006 2007 2008
6	Anthony Smith	19.5	2022 2023 2024 2025
7	Darrell Reid	16.0	2001 2002 2003 2004
8	D.L. Wilhite	15.5	2009 2010 2011 2012
	Theiren Cockran	15.5	2012 2013 2014 2015
10	Boye Mafe	15.0	2018 2019 2020 2021

Single season
Rank	Player	Sacks	Year
1	Lamanzer Williams	18.5	1997
2	Karon Riley	16.0	1999
3	Karon Riley	13.0	2000
4	Anthony Smith	12.5	2025
5	Ben Mezera	12.0	1999
6	Willie VanDeSteeg	10.5	2008
7	Willie VanDeSteeg	10.0	2006
8	Carter Coughlin	9.5	2018
9	D.L. Wilhite	8.5	2012
10	Tyrone Carter	8.0	1998

Single game
Rank	Player	Sacks	Year	Opponent
1	Karon Riley	4.0	2000	Iowa
	Willie VanDeSteeg	4.0	2006	Michigan State

== Kicking ==
=== Field goals made ===
Career
Rank	Player	FGs	Years
1	Dan Nystrom	71	1999 2000 2001 2002
2	Chip Lohmiller	57	1984 1985 1986 1987
3	Emmit Carpenter	53	2016 2017 2018
4	Paul Rogind	44	1976 1977 1978 1979
5	Dragan Kesich	43	2022 2023 2024
6	Mike Chalberg	41	1991 1993 1994 1995
7	Jim Gallery	40	1980 1981 1982 1983
8	Adam Bailey	38	1996 1997 1998
9	Brent Berglund	35	1988 1989 1990
10	Matthew Trickett	32	2021 2022

Single season
Rank	Player	FGs	Year
1	Dan Nystrom	25	2000
2	Dragan Kesich	23	2023
3	Emmit Carpenter	22	2016
4	Dan Nystrom	20	2002
	Dragan Kesich	20	2024
6	Paul Rogind	18	1977
7	Aaron Piepkorn	17	1992
	Mike Chalberg	17	1994
	Dan Nystrom	17	1999
	Ryan Santoso	17	2015
	Matthew Trickett	17	2021

Single game
Rank	Player	FGs	Year	Opponent
1	Adam Bailey	5	1987	Penn State
	Dan Nystrom	5	2002	Arkansas

=== Field goal percentage ===
Career
Rank	Player	FG%	Years
1	Emmit Carpenter	79.1%	2016 2017 2018
2	Dragan Kesich	76.8%	2022 2023 2024
3	Chip Lohmiller	76.0%	1984 1985 1986 1987
4	Joel Monroe	75.9%	2005 2006 2007 2008
5	Dan Nystrom	75.5%	1999 2000 2001 2002
6	Matthew Trickett	74.4%	2021 2022
7	Ryan Santoso	74.4%	2014 2015
8	Chris Hawthorne	74.1%	2011 2012 2013
9	Rhys Lloyd	72.2%	2003 2004
10	Adam Bailey	71.7%	1996 1997 1998

Single season
Rank	Player	FG%	Year
1	Dan Nystrom	95.2%	2002
2	Emmit Carpenter	91.7%	2016
3	Dragan Kesich	85.2%	2023
4	Matthew Trickett	83.3%	2022
5	Dan Nystrom	81.0%	1999
	Ryan Santoso	81.0%	2015
