= 2001 Minnesota Golden Gophers football team =

American college football season

2001 Minnesota Golden Gophers football
- Conference: Big Ten Conference
- Record: 4–7 (2–6 Big Ten)
- Head coach: Glen Mason (5th season)
- Co-offensive coordinators: Mitch Browning (2nd season); Tony Petersen (2nd season)
- Defensive coordinator: Moe Ankney (1st season)
- Captains: Jack Brewer; Derek Burns; Jimmy Henry; Ron Johnson
- Home stadium: Hubert H. Humphrey Metrodome

2001 Big Ten Conference football standings
	Conf.			Overall
Team	W		L	W		L
No. 12 Illinois $	7	–	1	10	–	2
No. 20 Michigan	6	–	2	8	–	4
Ohio State	5	–	3	7	–	5
Iowa	4	–	4	7	–	5
Purdue	4	–	4	6	–	6
Penn State	4	–	4	5	–	6
Indiana	4	–	4	5	–	6
Michigan State	3	–	5	7	–	5
Wisconsin	3	–	5	5	–	7
Minnesota	2	–	6	4	–	7
Northwestern	2	–	6	4	–	7
$ – BCS representative as conference champion; Rankings from AP Poll

The 2001 Minnesota Golden Gophers football team represented the University of Minnesota as a member of the Big Ten Conference during the 2001 NCAA Division I-A football season. In their fifth year under head coach Glen Mason, the Golden Gophers compiled an overall record of 4–7 with a mark of 2–6 in conference play, tying for tenth place at the bottom of the Big Ten standings, and outscored opponents 308 to 299. Minnesota played home games at the Hubert H. Humphrey Metrodome in Minneapolis.

== Schedule ==
Date	Time	Opponent	Site	TV	Result	Attendance
August 30	6:00 pm	at Toledo*	Glass Bowl; Toledo, OH (13abc.com Kickoff)	BCN	L 7–38	34,950
September 8	1:30 pm	Louisiana–Lafayette*	Hubert H. Humphrey Metrodome; Minneapolis, MN		W 44–14	35,089
September 29	11:00 am	No. 24 Purdue	Hubert H. Humphrey Metrodome; Minneapolis, MN	ESPN2	L 28–35 ^{OT}	40,160
October 6	11:00 am	at Illinois	Memorial Stadium; Champaign, IL	ESPN Plus	L 14–25	53,225
October 13	11:00 am	at Northwestern	Ryan Field; Evanston, IL	ESPN Plus	L 17–23	31,097
October 20	11:00 am	Michigan State	Hubert H. Humphrey Metrodome; Minneapolis, MN		W 28–19	47,385
October 27	1:30 pm	Murray State*	Hubert H. Humphrey Metrodome; Minneapolis, MN		W 66–10	36,981
November 3	6:45 pm	Ohio State	Hubert H. Humphrey Metrodome; Minneapolis, MN	ESPN	L 28–31	45,407
November 10	11:00 am	at No. 12 Michigan	Michigan Stadium; Ann Arbor, MI (Little Brown Jug)	ESPN2	L 10–31	110,828
November 17	11:00 am	at Iowa	Kinnick Stadium; Iowa City, IA (rivalry)	ESPN2	L 24–42	65,491
November 24	11:00 am	Wisconsin	Hubert H. Humphrey Metrodome; Minneapolis, MN (rivalry)	ESPN2	W 42–31	55,890
*Non-conference game; Rankings from AP Poll released prior to the game; All times are in Central time

The 2001 Minnesota Golden Gophers football team was not ranked in either the final USA Today/AFCA Coaches poll or Associated Press poll.

== Roster ==
2001 Minnesota Golden Gophers football team roster
Players
Coaches
Offense

Pos.	#	Name	Class
QB	8	Asad Abdul-Khaliq	So
RB	21	Marion Barber III	Fr
QB	7	Travis Cole	Sr
WR	3	Ron Johnson	Sr

Defense

Pos.	#	Name	Class
DE	99	Matt Anderle	Sr
FS	2	Jack Brewer	Sr
CB	39	Michael Lehan	Jr

Special teams

Pos.	#	Name	Class

Head coach

- Glen Mason

Coordinators/assistant coaches

Legend

- (C) Team captain
- (S) Suspended
- (I) Ineligible
- Injured
- Redshirt

Roster
