= 2004 Minnesota Golden Gophers football team =

American college football season

2004 Minnesota Golden Gophers football

Music City Bowl champion

Music City Bowl, W 20–16 vs. Alabama
- Conference: Big Ten Conference
- Record: 7–5 (3–5 Big Ten)
- Head coach: Glen Mason (8th season)
- Co-offensive coordinators: Mitch Browning (5th season); Tony Petersen (5th season)
- Defensive coordinator: Greg Hudson (2nd season)
- Captains: Greg Eslinger; Justin Fraley; Rian Melander; Darrell Reid
- Home stadium: Hubert H. Humphrey Metrodome

2004 Big Ten Conference football standings
	Conf.			Overall
Team	W		L	W		L
No. 14 Michigan $+	7	–	1	9	–	3
No. 8 Iowa +	7	–	1	10	–	2
No. 17 Wisconsin	6	–	2	9	–	3
Northwestern	5	–	3	6	–	6
No. 20 Ohio State	4	–	4	8	–	4
Purdue	4	–	4	7	–	5
Michigan State	4	–	4	5	–	7
Minnesota	3	–	5	7	–	5
Penn State	2	–	6	4	–	7
Illinois	1	–	7	3	–	8
Indiana	1	–	7	3	–	8
$ – BCS representative as conference champion; + – Conference co-champions; Rankings from AP Poll

The 2004 Minnesota Golden Gophers football team represented the University of Minnesota as a member of the Big Ten Conference during the 2004 NCAA Division I-A football season. In their eighth year under head coach Glen Mason, the Golden Gophers compiled an overall record of 7–5 with a mark of 3–5 in conference play, placing eighth in the Big Ten. Minnesota was invited to the Music City Bowl, where the Golden Gophers defeated Alabama. The team played home games at the Hubert H. Humphrey Metrodome in Minneapolis.

== Schedule ==
Date	Time	Opponent	Rank	Site	TV	Result	Attendance	Source
September 4	8:00 pm	Toledo*	No. 25	Hubert H. Humphrey Metrodome; Minneapolis, MN	ESPN2	W 63–21	45,144	
September 11	2:30 pm	Illinois State*	No. 22	Hubert H. Humphrey Metrodome; Minneapolis, MN	ESPN Plus	W 37–21	34,006	
September 18	9:00 pm	at Colorado State*	No. 22	Hughes Stadium; Fort Collins, CO	ESPN2	W 34–16	33,501	
September 25	8:00 pm	Northwestern	No. 19	Hubert H. Humphrey Metrodome; Minneapolis, MN	ESPN2	W 43–17	44,657	
October 2	7:00 pm	Penn State	No. 18	Hubert H. Humphrey Metrodome; Minneapolis, MN (Governor's Victory Bell)	ESPN Plus	W 16–7	50,386	
October 9	11:00 am	at No. 14 Michigan	No. 13	Michigan Stadium; Ann Arbor, MI (Little Brown Jug)	ESPN	L 24–27	111,518	
October 15	11:00 am	at Michigan State	No. 19	Spartan Stadium; East Lansing, MI	ESPN	L 17–51	72,383	
October 23	1:00 pm	Illinois		Hubert H. Humphrey Metrodome; Minneapolis, MN		W 45–0	46,526	
October 30	12:00 pm	at Indiana	No. 24	Memorial Stadium; Bloomington, IN		L 21–30	22,282	
November 6	2:30 pm	at No. 5 Wisconsin		Camp Randall Stadium; Madison, WI (rivalry)	ABC	L 14–38	83,069	
November 13	11:00 am	No. 19 Iowa		Hubert H. Humphrey Metrodome; Minneapolis, MN (rivalry)	ESPN	L 27–29	64,719	
December 31	11:00 am	vs. Alabama*		The Coliseum; Nashville, TN (Music City Bowl)	ESPN	W 20–16	66,089	
*Non-conference game; Rankings from AP Poll released prior to the game; All times are in Central time

== Roster ==
2004 Minnesota Golden Gophers football team roster
Players
Coaches
Offense

Pos.	#	Name	Class
RB	21	Marion Barber III	Jr
QB	3	Bryan Cupito	So
C	61	Greg Eslinger	Jr
WR	2	Paris Hamilton	Sr
RB	22	Laurence Maroney	So
WR	84	Logan Payne	So
RB	29	Amir Pinnix	Fr
WR	88	Micah Rucker	Fr
RB	24	Gary Russell	Fr
G	68	Mark Setterstrom	Jr
TE	89	Matt Spaeth	So
WR	82	Ernie Wheelwright	Fr

Defense

Pos.	#	Name	Class
S	23	Dominique Barber	Fr
DT	95	Anthony Montgomery	Jr
DE	51	Darrell Reid	Sr
DE	91	William VanDeSteeg	Fr

Special teams

Pos.	#	Name	Class
K	16	Rhys Loyd	Sr
LS	44	Robert McGarry IV	Fr

Head coach

- Glen Mason

Coordinators/assistant coaches

Legend

- (C) Team captain
- (S) Suspended
- (I) Ineligible
- Injured
- Redshirt
