= 1996 Minnesota Golden Gophers football team =

American college football season

1996 Minnesota Golden Gophers football
- Conference: Big Ten Conference
- Record: 4–7 (1–7 Big Ten)
- Head coach: Jim Wacker (5th season)
- Offensive coordinator: Bob DeBesse (5th season)
- Defensive coordinator: Tim Rose (1st season)
- Captains: Gann Brooks; Jerome Davis; Ben Langford; Cory Sauter
- Home stadium: Hubert H. Humphrey Metrodome

1996 Big Ten Conference football standings
	Conf.			Overall
Team	W		L	W		L
No. 2 Ohio State +	7	–	1	11	–	1
No. 15 Northwestern +	7	–	1	9	–	3
No. 7 Penn State	6	–	2	11	–	2
No. 18 Iowa	6	–	2	9	–	3
No. 20 Michigan	5	–	3	8	–	4
Michigan State	5	–	3	6	–	6
Wisconsin	3	–	5	8	–	5
Purdue	2	–	6	3	–	8
Minnesota	1	–	7	4	–	7
Indiana	1	–	7	3	–	8
Illinois	1	–	7	2	–	9
+ – Conference co-champions; Rankings from AP Poll

The 1996 Minnesota Golden Gophers football team represented the University of Minnesota as a member of the Big Ten Conference during the 1996 NCAA Division I-A football season. In their fifth and final year under head coach Jim Wacker, the Golden Gophers compiled am overall record of 4–7 with a mark of 1–7 in conference play, placing in a three-way tie for ninth at the bottom of the Big Ten standings, and were outscored 340 to 236.

Linebacker Luke Braaten, offensive tackle James Elizondo, offensive guard Pat Hau, quarterback Rob Jones, long snapper Derek Rackley, cornerback Fred Rodgers, quarterback Cory Sauter, linebacker Jim Tallman, linebacker Parc Williams and quarterback Spergon Wynn were named Academic All-Big Ten.

Wide receiver Ryan Thelwell and offensive tackle Gann Brooks were awarded the Bronko Nagurski Award. Wide receiver Tutu Atwell was awarded the Bruce Smith Award. Parc Williams was awarded the Carl Eller Award. Free safety Rishon Early was awarded the Bobby Bell Award. Cory Sauter was awarded the Butch Nash Award. Defensive tackle Jerome Davis was awarded the Paul Giel Award.

Total attendance for the season was 261,113, which averaged out to 43,519 per game. The season high for attendance was again rival Iowa.

== Schedule ==
Date	Time	Opponent	Site	TV	Result	Attendance
September 7	7:00 pm	at Northeast Louisiana*	Malone Stadium; Monroe, LA		W 30–3	24,842
September 14	7:00 pm	Ball State*	Hubert H. Humphrey Metrodome; Minneapolis, MN		W 26–23	41,007
September 21	7:30 pm	No. 23 Syracuse*	Hubert H. Humphrey Metrodome; Minneapolis, MN	ESPN2	W 35–33	45,756
October 5	11:20 am	at Purdue	Ross–Ade Stadium; West Lafayette, IN	ESPN Plus	L 27–30	39,343
October 12	11:30 am	at No. 15 Northwestern	Dyche Stadium; Evanston, IL	ESPN2	L 24–26	35,848
October 19	3:00 pm	Michigan State^{†}	Hubert H. Humphrey Metrodome; Minneapolis, MN		L 9–27	45,434
October 26	6:00 pm	No. 10 Michigan	Hubert H. Humphrey Metrodome; Minneapolis, MN (Little Brown Jug)	ESPN2	L 10–44	41,246
November 2	11:30 am	at No. 2 Ohio State	Ohio Stadium; Columbus, OH	ESPN2	L 0–45	93,588
November 9	11:20 am	at Wisconsin	Camp Randall Stadium; Madison, WI (rivalry)	ESPN Plus	L 28–45	78,006
November 16	6:00 pm	Illinois	Hubert H. Humphrey Metrodome; Minneapolis, MN	MSC	W 23–21	34,321
November 23	7:30 pm	Iowa	Hubert H. Humphrey Metrodome; Minneapolis, MN (rivalry)	ESPN2	L 24–43	53,349
*Non-conference game; ^{†}Homecoming; Rankings from AP Poll released prior to the game; All times are in Central time

== Roster ==
1996 Minnesota Golden Gophers football team roster
Players
Coaches
Offense

Pos.	#	Name	Class
RB	20	Jim Bean	Fr
G	60	Chris Bergstrom	Sr
QB	11	Rob Jones	Sr
QB	17	Cory Sauter	Jr
WR	4	Ryan Thelwell	Jr
C	61	Jason Zander	Fr

Defense

Pos.	#	Name	Class
DB	22	Tyrone Carter	Fr
CB	24	Rodney Heath	Sr
FS	23	Crawford Jordan	Jr
SS	32	Mike Juszczak	Jr
OLB	39	Ray Kaiser	Jr
DT	94	Josh Rawlings	Fr
DT	58	Antoine Richard	So
CB	2	Craig Scruggs	So
ILB	46	Rufus Smith	So
OLB	15	Don Williams	Jr
ILB	37	Parc Williams	So
ILB	93	Jude Wimberger	Fr
OLB	26	Blake Zochert	Fr

Special teams

Pos.	#	Name	Class

Head coach

- Jim Wacker

Coordinators/assistant coaches

- Lee Fobbs (Outside linebackers)

Legend

- (C) Team captain
- (S) Suspended
- (I) Ineligible
- Injured
- Redshirt

Roster
