= 1995 Minnesota Golden Gophers football team =

American college football season

1995 Minnesota Golden Gophers football
- Conference: Big Ten Conference
- Record: 3–8 (1–7 Big Ten)
- Head coach: Jim Wacker (4th season)
- Offensive coordinator: Bob DeBesse (4th season)
- Defensive coordinator: Marc Dove (4th season)
- Captains: Justin Conzemius; Chris Darkins; Todd Jesewitz; Craig Sauer
- Home stadium: Hubert H. Humphrey Metrodome

1995 Big Ten Conference football standings
| | Conf. | | | | | Overall |
| Team | W | | L | | T | W | | L | | T |
|---|---|---|---|---|---|---|---|---|---|---|
| No. 8 Northwestern $ | 8 | – | 0 | – | 0 | 10 | – | 2 | – | 0 |
| No. 6 Ohio State | 7 | – | 1 | – | 0 | 11 | – | 2 | – | 0 |
| No. 13 Penn State | 5 | – | 3 | – | 0 | 9 | – | 3 | – | 0 |
| No. 17 Michigan | 5 | – | 3 | – | 0 | 9 | – | 4 | – | 0 |
| Michigan State | 4 | – | 3 | – | 1 | 6 | – | 5 | – | 1 |
| No. 25 Iowa | 4 | – | 4 | – | 0 | 8 | – | 4 | – | 0 |
| Illinois | 3 | – | 4 | – | 1 | 5 | – | 5 | – | 1 |
| Wisconsin | 3 | – | 4 | – | 1 | 4 | – | 5 | – | 2 |
| Purdue | 2 | – | 5 | – | 1 | 4 | – | 6 | – | 1 |
| Minnesota | 1 | – | 7 | – | 0 | 3 | – | 8 | – | 0 |
| Indiana | 0 | – | 8 | – | 0 | 2 | – | 9 | – | 0 |
$ – Conference champion; Rankings from AP Poll

The 1995 Minnesota Golden Gophers football team represented the University of Minnesota as a member of the Big Ten Conference during the 1995 NCAA Division I-A football season. In their fourth year under head coach Jim Wacker, the Golden Gophers compiled am overall record of 3–8 with a mark of 1–7 in conference play, placing tenth in the Big Ten, and were outscored 368 to 272.

Offensive guard Todd Jesewitz and linebacker Broderick Hall (American football) were named All-Big Ten second team. Defensive back Justin Conzemius was named Academic All-American second team. Kicker Mike Chalberg, defensive back Justin Conzemius, defensive tackle Troy Duerr, offensive lineman Chris Fowlkes, linebacker Peter Hiestand, offensive lineman Todd Jesewitz, quarterback Rob Jones, wide receiver Tony Levine, defensive tackle Antoine Richard, linebacker Craig Sauer, quarterback Cory Sauter, linebacker Jim Tallman, defensive end Dave Watson, linebacker Parc Williams and long snapper Scott Williams were named Academic All-Big Ten.

Craig Sauer was awarded the Bronko Nagurski Award and Carl Eller Award. Cory Sauter was awarded the Bruce Smith Award. Mike Chalberg was awarded the Bobby Bell Award. Justin Conzemius was awarded the Butch Nash Award. Running back Chris Darkins was awarded the Paul Giel Award.

Total home attendance for the season was 291,173, which averaged out to 48,529 per game. The season high for attendance was against Wisconsin.

== Schedule ==
| Date | Time | Opponent | Site | TV | Result | Attendance |
|---|---|---|---|---|---|---|
| September 16 | 6:00 pm | Ball State* | Hubert H. Humphrey Metrodome; Minneapolis, MN | MSC | W 31–7 | 48,420 |
| September 23 | 11:00 am | at Syracuse* | Carrier Dome; Syracuse, NY | Creative | L 17–27 | 42,780 |
| September 30 | 6:00 pm | Arkansas State* | Hubert H. Humphrey Metrodome; Minneapolis, MN | MSC | W 55–7 | 42,472 |
| October 7 | 6:00 pm | Purdue | Hubert H. Humphrey Metrodome; Minneapolis, MN | | W 39–38 | 39,343 |
| October 14 | 6:00 pm | No. 14 Northwestern^{†} | Hubert H. Humphrey Metrodome; Minneapolis, MN | MSC | L 17–27 | 50,504 |
| October 21 | 12:00 pm | at Michigan State | Spartan Stadium; East Lansing, MI | | L 31–34 | 70,123 |
| October 28 | 2:30 pm | at No. 9 Michigan | Michigan Stadium; Ann Arbor, MI (Little Brown Jug) | ABC | L 17–52 | 104,929 |
| November 4 | 6:00 pm | No. 4 Ohio State | Hubert H. Humphrey Metrodome; Minneapolis, MN | ESPN2 | L 21–49 | 46,418 |
| November 11 | 6:00 pm | Wisconsin | Hubert H. Humphrey Metrodome; Minneapolis, MN (rivalry) | ESPN2 | L 27–34 | 64,016 |
| November 18 | 1:00 pm | at Illinois | Memorial Stadium; Champaign, IL | | L 14-48 | 45,521 |
| November 25 | 1:05 pm | at Iowa | Kinnick Stadium; Iowa City, IA (rivalry) | | L 3–45 | 65,794 |
*Non-conference game; ^{†}Homecoming; Rankings from AP Poll released prior to the game; All times are in Central time

== Game summaries ==
=== Ball State ===
Ball State Cardinals at Minnesota Golden Gophers

| Quarter | 1 | 2 | 3 | 4 | Total |
|---|---|---|---|---|---|
| Ball State | 0 | 0 | 0 | 7 | 7 |
| Minnesota | 3 | 14 | 14 | 0 | 31 |

at Hubert H. Humphrey Metrodome, Minneapolis, Minnesota

- Date: September 16, 1995
- Game time: 6:00 p.m. CST
- Game weather: Cool, 72 °F (22 °C), No Wind (indoors)
- Game attendance: 48,420
- Box Score

Game information
First quarter
- MIN - 6:58-Chalberg 42 FG

Second quarter

- MIN - 14:55-Thelwell 21 pass from Sauter (Chalberg kick)
- MIN - 3:17-Thelwell 36 pass from Sauter (Chalberg kick)

Third quarter

- MIN - 11:22-Thelwell 32 pass from Sauter (Chalberg kick)
- MIN - 3:50-Darkins 2 run (Chalberg kick)

Fourth quarter

- BALL - 0:12-Abernathy 14 pass from Knisely (Lockliear kick)

=== Syracuse ===
Minnesota Golden Gophers at Syracuse Orangemen

| Quarter | 1 | 2 | 3 | 4 | Total |
|---|---|---|---|---|---|
| Minnesota | 3 | 7 | 7 | 0 | 17 |
| Syracuse | 3 | 10 | 14 | 0 | 27 |

at Carrier Dome, Syracuse, New York

- Date: September 23, 1995
- Game time: 11:00 a.m. CST
- Game attendance: 42,780
- TV: Creative
- Box Score

Game information
First quarter
- MIN - 6:58-Chalberg 27 FG
- SYR - 0:52-Mare 29 FG

Second quarter

- MIN - 11:23-Darkins 1 run (Chalberg kick)
- SYR - 8:24-Mare 48 FG
- SYR - 5:02-Harrison 94 punt return (Mare kick)

Third quarter

- SYR - 13:02-Thomas 14 run (Mare kick)
- SYR - 4:55-Harrison 30 pass from McNabb (Mare kick)
- MIN - 3:50-Nelson 13 pass from Sauter (Chalberg kick)

Fourth quarter

- No scoring

=== Arkansas State ===
Arkansas State Indians at Minnesota Golden Gophers

| Quarter | 1 | 2 | 3 | 4 | Total |
|---|---|---|---|---|---|
| Arkansas State | 0 | 0 | 7 | 0 | 7 |
| Minnesota | 24 | 17 | 7 | 7 | 55 |

at Hubert H. Humphrey Metrodome, Minneapolis, Minnesota

- Date: September 30, 1995
- Game time: 6:00 p.m. CST
- Game weather: Cool, 72 °F (22 °C), No Wind (indoors)
- Game attendance: 42,742
- Box Score

Game information
First quarter
- MIN - 12:31-Jordan 45 interception return (Chalberg kick)
- MIN - 11:00-Thelwell 11 pass from Sauter (Chalberg kick)
- MIN - 5:03-Cooper 1 run (Chalberg kick)
- MIN - 0:38-Chalberg 21 FG

Second quarter

- MIN - 13:46-Atwell 17 run (Chalberg kick)
- MIN - 8:43-Atwell 28 pass from Sauter (Chalberg kick)
- MIN - 0:15-Chalberg 30 FG

Third quarter

- MIN - 12:56-Reem 10 pass from Sauter (Chalberg kick)
- ARST - 3:24-McIntosh 30 pass from Covington (Caldwell kick)

Fourth quarter

- MIN - 14:46-Levine 16 run (Chalberg kick)

=== Purdue ===
Purdue Boilermakers at Minnesota Golden Gophers

| Quarter | 1 | 2 | 3 | 4 | Total |
|---|---|---|---|---|---|
| Purdue | 7 | 10 | 14 | 7 | 38 |
| Minnesota | 7 | 0 | 17 | 15 | 39 |

at Hubert H. Humphrey Metrodome, Minneapolis, Minnesota

- Date: October 7, 1995
- Game time: 6:00 p.m. CST
- Game weather: Cool, 72 °F (22 °C), No Wind (indoors)
- Game attendance: 39,343
- Box Score

Game information

First quarter

- PUR - Alstott 11 run (Bobich kick)
- MIN - Sauter 1 run (Chalberg kick)

Second quarter

- PUR - Bobich 19 FG
- PUR - Alstott 1 run (Bobich kick)

Third quarter

- MIN - Darkins 7 run (Chalberg kick)
- PUR - Alstott 3 run (Bobich kick)
- MIN - Darkins 45 run (Chalberg kick)
- MIN - Chalberg 48 FG
- PUR - Alford 78 pass from Trefzger (Bobich kick)

Fourth quarter

- MIN - Darkins 24 run (Chalberg kick)
- PUR - Trefzger 4 run (Bobich kick)
- MIN - Sauter 1 run (Thelwell pass from Sauter)

Top Passers

- PUR - Rick Trefzger - 13/24, 264 yards, 1 TD
- MIN - Cory Sauter - 15/26, 142 yards, 1 INT

Top Rushers

- MIN - Chris Darkins - 38 rushes, 294 yards, 3 TDs
- PUR - *Mike Alstott 28 rushes, 133 yards, 3 TDs

Top Receivers

- PUR - Brian Alford - 6 receptions, 172 yards, 1 TD
- MIN - Ryan Thelwell - 6 receptions, 55 yards

=== Northwestern ===
Northwestern Wildcats at Minnesota Golden Gophers

| Quarter | 1 | 2 | 3 | 4 | Total |
|---|---|---|---|---|---|
| Northwestern | 3 | 11 | 7 | 6 | 27 |
| Minnesota | 7 | 7 | 0 | 3 | 17 |

at Hubert H. Humphrey Metrodome, Minneapolis, Minnesota

- Date: October 14, 1995
- Game time: 6:00 p.m. CST
- Game weather: Cool, 72 °F (22 °C), No Wind (indoors)
- Game attendance: 50,504
- Box Score

Game information

First quarter

- NU - 3:49-Valenzisi 20 FG
- MIN - 0:30-Kratochvil 4 pass from Sauter (Chalberg kick)

Second quarter

- MIN - 13:08-Darkins 6 run (Chalberg kick)
- NU - 9:47-Valenzisi 29 FG
- NU - 5:42-Autry 18 run (Bates pass from Schnur)

Third quarter

- NU - 3:57-Autry 11 run (Valenzisi kick)

Fourth quarter

- NU - 12:21-Autry 73 run (kick failed)
- MIN - 8:51-Chalberg 47 FG

Top Rushers

- MIN - Chris Darkins - 25 rushes, 75 yards, 1 TD
- NU - Darnell Autry - 28 rushes, 169 yards, 3 TDs

Top Passers

- MIN - Cory Sauter - 29/50, 303 yards, 1 TD, 1 INT
- NU - Steve Schnur - 13/23, 194 yards, 1 TD

Top Receivers

- MIN - Ryan Thelwell - 10 receptions, 105 yards
- MIN - Chris Darkins - 5 receptions, 55 yards
- NU - D'Wayne Bates - 6 receptions, 100 yards
- NU - Matt Hartl - 5 receptions, 64 yards

=== Michigan State ===
Minnesota Golden Gophers at Michigan State Spartans

| Quarter | 1 | 2 | 3 | 4 | Total |
|---|---|---|---|---|---|
| Minnesota | 7 | 10 | 14 | 0 | 31 |
| Michigan State | 14 | 7 | 0 | 13 | 34 |

at Spartan Stadium, East Lansing, Michigan

- Date: October 21, 1995
- Game time: 11:00 p.m. CST
- Game attendance: 70,123
- Box Score

Game information
First quarter
- MIN - 10:23-Atwell 58 pass from Sauter (Chalberg kick)
- MSU - 6:39-Renaud 9 run (Gardner kick)
- MSU - 0:25-Renaud 18 run (Gardner kick)

Second quarter

- MIN - 11:56-Chalberg 45 FG
- MSU - 6:52-Carter 33 pass from Banks (Gardner kick)
- MIN - 3:45-Duerr 1 pass from Sauter (Chalberg kick)

Third quarter

- MIN - 4:12-Thelwell 8 pass from Sauter (Chalberg kick)
- MIN - 2:33-Thelwell 21 pass from Sauter (Chalberg kick)

Fourth quarter

- MSU - 14:11-Gardner 27 FG
- MSU - 9:55-Mason 65 pass from Banks (Gardner kick)
- MSU - 4:50-Gardner 24 FG

=== Michigan ===
Minnesota Golden Gophers at Michigan Wolverines

| Quarter | 1 | 2 | 3 | 4 | Total |
|---|---|---|---|---|---|
| Minnesota | 0 | 10 | 0 | 7 | 17 |
| Michigan | 21 | 0 | 17 | 14 | 52 |

at Michigan Stadium, Ann Arbor, Michigan

- Date: October 28, 1995
- Game time: 2:30 p.m. CST
- Game attendance: 104,929
- Box Score

Game information

First quarter

- MICH - 8:04-Biakabutuka 52 run (Hamilton kick)
- MICH - 7:30-Biakabutuka 16 run (Hamilton kick)
- MICH - 4:47-Toomer 75 pass from Griese (Hamilton kick)

Second quarter

- MIN - 2:38-Chalberg 30 FG
- MIN - 0:47-Cooper 2 run (Chalberg kick)

Third quarter

- MICH - 13:27-Toomer 52 pass from Griese (Hamilton kick)
- MICH - 9:41-Hamilton 26 FG
- MICH - 1:55-Howard 5 pass from Griese (Hamilton kick)

Fourth quarter

- MICH - 11:59-Riemersma 6 pass from Griese (Hamilton kick)
- MICH - 5:16-Williams 11 run (Hamilton kick)
- MIN - 1:19-Nelson 13 pass from Sauter (Chalberg kick)

Rushing

- MIN - Rafael Cooper - 14/68, 1 TD
- MICH - Tshimanga Biakabutuka - 19/196, 2 TDs

Passing

- MIN - Cory Sauter - 39/20/2, 206 yards, 1 TD
- MICH - Brian Griese - 19/14/0, 271 yards, 4 TDs

Receiving

- MIN - Ryan Thelwell - 6/85
- MIN - Johnny Woodson - 5/36
- MICH - Amani Toomer - 5/177, 2 TDs
- MICH - Mercury Hayes - 2/50

=== Ohio State ===
Ohio State Buckeyes at Minnesota Golden Gophers

| Quarter | 1 | 2 | 3 | 4 | Total |
|---|---|---|---|---|---|
| Ohio State | 7 | 28 | 14 | 0 | 49 |
| Minnesota | 14 | 0 | 0 | 7 | 21 |

at Hubert H. Humphrey Metrodome, Minneapolis, Minnesota

- Date: November 4, 1995
- Game time: 7:00 p.m. EST
- Game weather: Cool, 72 °F (22 °C), No Wind (indoors)
- Game attendance: 46,418
- Referee: Tom Quinn
- Box Score

Game information

First quarter

- MIN - Javon Jackson 9-yard run (Mike Chalberg kick)
- OSU - Terry Glenn 39-yard pass from Bobby Hoying (Josh Jackson kick)
- MIN - Tutu Atwell 10-yard pass from Jason Murdock (Mike Chalberg kick)

Second quarter

- OSU - Bobby Hoying 9-yard run (Josh Jackson kick)
- OSU - Eddie George 11-yard run (Josh Jackson kick)
- OSU - Pepe Pearson 18-yard run (Josh Jackson kick)
- OSU - Rickey Dudley 9-yard pass from Bobby Hoying (Josh Jackson kick)

Third quarter

- OSU - Eddie George 87-yard run (Josh Jackson kick)
- OSU - Eddie George 1-yard run (Josh Jackson kick)

Fourth quarter

- MIN - Lee Hutton 54-yard pass from Jason Murdock (Mike Chalberg kick)

Top Passers

- OSU - Bobby Hoying - 16/24, 287 yards, 2 TDs
- MIN - Jason Murdock - 13/27, 174 yards, 2 TDs, 2 INTs

Top Rushers

- OSU - Eddie George - 23 rushes, 178 yards, 3 TDs
- OSU - Pepe Pearson - 12 rushes, 71 yards, 1 TD

Top Receivers

- MIN - Tutu Atwell - 8 receptions, 116 yards, 1 TD
- OSU - Terry Glenn - 3 receptions, 103 yards, 1 TD

Top Tacklers

- OSU - Rob Kelly - 8 (6 solo, 2 assisted)
- MIN - Justin Conzemius - 7 (7 solo)

Interceptions

- OSU - 2 - Mike Vrabel (1), Anthony Gwinn (1)

=== Wisconsin ===
Wisconsin Badgers at Minnesota Golden Gophers

| Quarter | 1 | 2 | 3 | 4 | Total |
|---|---|---|---|---|---|
| Wisconsin | 7 | 6 | 21 | 0 | 34 |
| Minnesota | 3 | 7 | 10 | 7 | 27 |

at Hubert H. Humphrey Metrodome, Minneapolis, Minnesota

- Date: November 11, 1995
- Game time: 6:00 p.m. CST
- Game weather: Cool, 72 °F (22 °C), No Wind (indoors)
- Game attendance: 64,016
- Box Score

Game information
First quarter
- WIS - T Simmons 62 pass from Bevell (J Hall kick)
- MIN - FG Chalberg 30

Second quarter

- MIN - Atwell 51 pass from Sauter (Chalberg kick)
- WIS - FG J Hall 28
- WIS - FG J Hall 60

Third quarter

- MIN - Hubbard 63 pass from Sauter (Chalberg kick)
- WIS - A Stecker 100 kickoff return (J Hall kick)
- WIS - A Stecker 3 run (J Hall kick)
- MIN - FG Chalberg 26
- WIS - T Simmons 70 pass from Bevell (J Hall kick)

Fourth quarter

- MIN - Levine 39 pass from Sauter (Chalberg kick)

=== Illinois ===
Minnesota Golden Gophers at Illinois Fighting Illini

| Quarter | 1 | 2 | 3 | 4 | Total |
|---|---|---|---|---|---|
| Minnesota | 0 | 7 | 7 | 0 | 14 |
| Illinois | 10 | 14 | 7 | 21 | 52 |

at Memorial Stadium, Champaign, Illinois

- Date: November 18, 1995
- Game time: 1:00 pm CST
- Game attendance: 45,521
- Box score

Game information
- Sources: Box score and Game recap

First quarter

- ILL - 9:46-Cushing 40 pass from J. Johnson (Scheuplein kick)
- ILL - 7:00-Scheuplein 44 FG

Second quarter

- ILL - 14:23-M. Johnson 2 run (Scheuplein kick)
- MIN - 3:06-Atwell 40 pass from Sauter (Chalberg kick)
- ILL - 0:56-J. Johnson 6 run (Scheuplein kick)

Third quarter

- ILL - 6:00-Scheuplein 29 FG
- MIN - 1:10-Cooper 2 pass from Sauter (Chalberg kick)

Fourth quarter

- ILL - 13:37-Dulick 6 pass from J. Johnson (Scheuplein kick)
- ILL - 9:55-Rice 27 fumble return (Scheuplein kick)
- ILL - 7:18-Holcombe 29 run (Scheuplein kick)

Top Rushers

- MIN - Rafael Cooper - 29 rushes, 94 yards
- MIN - Javon Jackson - 5 rushes, 34 yards
- ILL - Robert Holcombe - 24 rushes, 206 yards, 1 TD
- ILL - Ty Douthard - 8 rushes, 48 yards

Top Passers

- MIN - Cory Sauter - 34/21, 242 yards, 2 TDs, 2 INTs
- ILL - Johnny Johnson - 22/11, 174 yards, 2 TDs

Receiving

- MIN - Johnny Woodson - 6 receptions, 74 yards
- MIN - Tutu Atwell - 4 receptions, 62 yards, 1 TD
- ILL - Jason Dulick - 4 receptions, 61 yards, 1 TD
- ILL - Matt Cushing - 2 receptions, 51 yards, 1 TD

=== Iowa ===
Minnesota Golden Gophers at Iowa Hawkeyes

| Quarter | 1 | 2 | 3 | 4 | Total |
|---|---|---|---|---|---|
| Minnesota | 0 | 0 | 3 | 0 | 3 |
| Iowa | 7 | 10 | 7 | 21 | 45 |

at Kinnick Stadium, Iowa City, Iowa

- Date: November 25, 1995
- Game time: 1:05 pm CST
- Game weather: 45 °F (7 °C), Sunny, Wind W 10 mph (16 km/h)
- Game attendance: 65,794
- Referee: Jim Kemerling
- TV: ESPN
- Box score and Game recap

Game information
First quarter
- IOWA - Tim Dwight 10-yard pass from Matt Sherman (Zach Bromert kick) IOWA 7–0

Second quarter

- IOWA - Dwight 14-yard pass from Sherman (Bromert kick) IOWA 14–0
- IOWA - Zach Bromert 25-yard field goal IOWA 17–0

Third quarter

- MINN - Chalberg 24-yard field goal IOWA 17–3
- IOWA - Shakoor 13-yard run (Bromert kick) IOWA 24–3

Fourth quarter

- IOWA - Michael Burger 2-yard run (Bromert kick) IOWA 31–3
- IOWA - Shakoor 2-yard run (Bromert kick) IOWA 38–3
- IOWA - Willock 17-yard pass from Ryan Driscoll (Bromert kick) IOWA 45–3

== Roster ==
1995 Minnesota Golden Gophers football team roster
Players
Coaches
Offense

| Pos. | # | Name | Class |
|---|---|---|---|
| RB | 44 | Chris Darkins | Sr |
| QB | 17 | Cory Sauter | So |
| WR | 4 | Ryan Thelwell | So |
| QB | 13 | Spergon Wynn | Fr |

Defense

| Pos. | # | Name | Class |
|---|---|---|---|
| CB | 24 | Rodney Heath | Jr |
| LB | 16 | Craig Sauer | Sr |

Special teams

| Pos. | # | Name | Class |

Head coach

- Jim Wacker

Coordinators/assistant coaches

Legend

- (C) Team captain
- (S) Suspended
- (I) Ineligible
- Injured
- Redshirt
