= 1998 Minnesota Golden Gophers football team =

American college football season

1998 Minnesota Golden Gophers football
- Conference: Big Ten Conference
- Record: 5–6 (2–6 Big Ten)
- Head coach: Glen Mason (2nd season)
- Offensive coordinator: Steve Loney (1st season)
- Defensive coordinator: David Gibbs (2nd season)
- Captains: Troy Duerr; Antoine Richard; Parc Williams
- Home stadium: Hubert H. Humphrey Metrodome

1998 Big Ten Conference football standings
	Conf.			Overall
Team	W		L	W		L
No. 2 Ohio State %+	7	–	1	11	–	1
No. 6 Wisconsin $+	7	–	1	11	–	1
No. 12 Michigan +	7	–	1	10	–	3
No. 24 Purdue	6	–	2	9	–	4
No. 17 Penn State	5	–	3	9	–	3
Michigan State	4	–	4	6	–	6
Minnesota	2	–	6	5	–	6
Indiana	2	–	6	4	–	7
Illinois	2	–	6	3	–	8
Iowa	2	–	6	3	–	8
Northwestern	0	–	8	3	–	9
$ – BCS representative as conference champion; % – BCS at-large representative; + – Conference co-champions; Rankings from AP Poll

The 1998 Minnesota Golden Gophers football team represented the University of Minnesota as a member of the Big Ten Conference during the 1998 NCAA Division I-A football season. In their second year under head coach Glen Mason, an overall record of 5–6 with a mark of 2–6 in conference play, placing in a four-way tie for seventh in the Big Ten, record and were outscored 249 to 229.

Tyrone Carter was named an All-American by Football News and The Sports Network. Carter was also named All-Big Ten first team. Running back Thomas Hamner was named All-Big Ten second team. Defensive tackle Matt Anderle, linebacker Luke Braaten, cornerback Jason Hagman, linebacker Justin Hall, fullback Brad Prigge, long snapper Derek Rackley, offensive guard Ryan Roth, tight end Zach Vevea, linebacker Jim Wilkinson and linebacker Parc Williams were named Academic All-Big Ten.

Total attendance for the season was 249,764, which averaged out to 41,627 per game. The season high for attendance was against rival Iowa.

== Schedule ==
Date	Time	Opponent	Site	TV	Result	Attendance	Source
September 5	1:30 pm	Arkansas State*	Hubert H. Humphrey Metrodome; Minneapolis, MN		W 17–14	40,112	
September 12	7:00 pm	at Houston*	Robertson Stadium; Houston, TX		W 14–7	17,540	
September 19	2:30 pm	Memphis*	Hubert H. Humphrey Metrodome; Minneapolis, MN	MSC	W 41–14	35,919	
October 3	1:00 pm	at Purdue	Ross–Ade Stadium; West Lafayette, IN		L 21–56	56,809	
October 10	2:30 pm	No. 13 Penn State	Hubert H. Humphrey Metrodome; Minneapolis, MN (Governor's Victory Bell)	ABC	L 17–27	40,456	
October 17	11:00 am	at No. 1 Ohio State	Ohio Stadium; Columbus, OH	ESPN	L 15–45	93,183	
October 24	11:00 am	Michigan State	Hubert H. Humphrey Metrodome; Minneapolis, MN	ESPN Plus	W 19–18	41,327	
October 31	11:00 am	No. 22 Michigan	Hubert H. Humphrey Metrodome; Minneapolis, MN (Little Brown Jug)	ESPN	L 10–15	41,310	
November 7	11:00 am	at No. 8 Wisconsin	Camp Randall Stadium; Madison, WI (rivalry)	ESPN	L 7–26	78,767	
November 14	12:00 pm	at Indiana	Memorial Stadium; Bloomington, IN		L 19–20	30,049	
November 21	1:30 pm	Iowa	Hubert H. Humphrey Metrodome; Minneapolis, MN (rivalry)		W 49–7	50,640	
*Non-conference game; Rankings from AP Poll released prior to the game; All times are in Central time

== Roster ==
1998 Minnesota Golden Gophers football team roster
Players
Coaches
Offense

Pos.	#	Name	Class
FB	44	Jason Andraschko	Fr
WR	23	Arland Bruce	Jr
QB	5	Billy Cockerham	Jr
OT	74	Adam Haayer	So
G	55	Ben Hamilton	So
RB	12	Thomas Hamner	Jr
G	77	Pat Hau	Jr
WR	3	Ron Johnson	Fr

Defense

Pos.	#	Name	Class
FS	2	Jack Brewer	Fr
SS	22	Tyrone Carter	Jr
DT	93	John Schlecht	So
CB	30	Jimmy Wyrick	Jr

Special teams

Pos.	#	Name	Class
LS	18	Derek Rackley	Jr

Head coach

- Glen Mason

Coordinators/assistant coaches

Legend

- (C) Team captain
- (S) Suspended
- (I) Ineligible
- Injured
- Redshirt

Roster
