= 1993 Minnesota Golden Gophers football team =

American college football season

1993 Minnesota Golden Gophers football
- Conference: Big Ten Conference
- Record: 4–7 (3–5 Big Ten)
- Head coach: Jim Wacker (2nd season)
- Offensive coordinator: Bob DeBesse (2nd season)
- Defensive coordinator: Marc Dove (2nd season)
- Captains: Dennis Cappella; Antonio Carter; Russ Heath; Robert Rogers
- Home stadium: Hubert H. Humphrey Metrodome

1993 Big Ten Conference football standings
	Conf.					Overall
Team	W		L		T	W		L		T
No. 6 Wisconsin +	6	–	1	–	1	10	–	1	–	1
No. 11 Ohio State +	6	–	1	–	1	10	–	1	–	1
No. 8 Penn State	6	–	2	–	0	10	–	2	–	0
Indiana	5	–	3	–	0	8	–	4	–	0
No. 21 Michigan	5	–	3	–	0	8	–	4	–	0
Illinois	5	–	3	–	0	5	–	6	–	0
Michigan State	4	–	4	–	0	6	–	6	–	0
Iowa	3	–	5	–	0	6	–	6	–	0
Minnesota	3	–	5	–	0	4	–	7	–	0
Northwestern	0	–	8	–	0	2	–	9	–	0
Purdue	0	–	8	–	0	1	–	10	–	0
+ – Conference co-champions; Rankings from AP Poll

The 1993 Minnesota Golden Gophers football team represented the University of Minnesota in the 1993 NCAA Division I-A football season. In their second year under head coach Jim Wacker, the Golden Gophers compiled a 4–7 record and were outscored by their opponents by a combined total of 354 to 253.

Offensive guard Rob Rogers and wide receiver Omar Douglas were named All-Big Ten second team. Defensive back Justin Conzemius, wide receiver Omar Douglas and linebacker Jeff Rosga were all named second team Academic All-Americans. Kicker Mike Chalberg, defensive back Justin Conzemius, wide receiver Omar Douglas, offensive lineman Chris Fowlkes, linebacker Peter Hiestand, offensive lineman Todd Jesewitz, linebacker Ben Langford, defensive back Jeff Rosga, linebacker Craig Sauer, tight end Mark Tangen and linebacker Lance Wolkow were named Academic All-Big Ten.

Douglas was awarded the Bronko Nagurski Award, Bruce Smith Award and Butch Nash Award. Linebacker Andrew Veit was awarded the Carl Eller Award. Long snapper Scott Williams was awarded the Bobby Bell Award. Running back Antonio Carter was awarded the Paul Giel Award.

The total home attendance for the season was 239,973, which averaged to 39,995 per game. The season attendance high was against Wisconsin, with 64,798 in attendance.

== Schedule ==
Date	Time	Opponent	Site	TV	Result	Attendance	Source
September 4	12:00 pm	at No. 17 Penn State	Beaver Stadium; University Park, PA (Governor's Victory Bell)	MSC	L 20–38	95,387	
September 11	6:00 pm	Indiana State*	Hubert H. Humphrey Metrodome; Minneapolis, MN		W 27–10	30,719	
September 18	7:00 pm	Kansas State*	Hubert H. Humphrey Metrodome; Minneapolis, MN		L 25–30	36,245	
September 25	8:00 pm	at San Diego State*	Jack Murphy Stadium; San Diego, CA	KMSP	L 17–48	41,487	
October 2	7:00 pm	Indiana	Hubert H. Humphrey Metrodome; Minneapolis, MN		L 19–23	33,315	
October 9	6:00 pm	Purdue	Hubert H. Humphrey Metrodome; Minneapolis, MN		W 59–56	31,293	
October 16	1:00 pm	at Northwestern	Dyche Stadium; Evanston, IL		W 28–26	27,814	
October 23	6:00 pm	No. 15 Wisconsin^{†}	Hubert H. Humphrey Metrodome; Minneapolis, MN (rivalry)		W 28–21	64,798	
November 6	11:30 am	at Illinois	Memorial Stadium; Champaign, IL	ESPN	L 20–23	50,192	
November 13	11:30 am	Michigan	Hubert H. Humphrey Metrodome; Minneapolis, MN (Little Brown Jug)	ESPN	L 7–58	43,603	
November 20	1:05 pm	at Iowa	Kinnick Stadium; Iowa City, IA (rivalry)		L 3–21	66,840	
*Non-conference game; ^{†}Homecoming; Rankings from AP Poll released prior to the game; All times are in Central time

== Game summaries ==
=== Purdue ===
Team	1	2	3	4	Total
Purdue	14	14	14	14	56
• Minnesota	7	14	28	10	59

- Date: October 9
- Location: Hubert H. Humphrey Metrodome
- Game attendance: 31,293
- Game weather: Indoors (dome)

Scoring summary
Q1		PUR	Alstott 15 yard run (Bobich kick)	PUR 7–0
Q1		PUR	Rogers 1 yard run (Bobich kick)	PUR 14–0
Q1		MINN	Douglas 11 yard pass from Eckers (Chalberg kick)	PUR 14–7
Q2		PUR	Alstott 26 yard run (Bobich kick)	PUR 21–7
Q2		MINN	Darkins 1 yard run (Chalberg kick)	PUR 21–14
Q2		PUR	Rogers 1 yard run (Bobich kick)	PUR 28–14
Q2		MINN	Douglas 21 yard pass from Eckers (Chalberg kick)	PUR 28–21
Q3		PUR	Alstott 9 yard pass from Pike (Bobich kick)	PUR 35–21
Q3		MINN	Douglas 31 yard pass from Eckers (Chalberg kick)	PUR 35–28
Q3		PUR	Alstott 11 yard run (Bobich kick)	PUR 42–28
Q3		MINN	Douglas 33 yard pass from Eckers (Chalberg kick)	PUR 42–35
Q3		MINN	Douglas 1 yard pass from Eckers (Chalberg kick)	Tie 42–42
Q3		MINN	Conzemius 55 yard interception return (Chalberg kick)	MINN 49–42
Q4		PUR	Rogers 2 yard run (Bobich kick)	Tie 49–49
Q4		MINN	Garrison 26 yard pass from Eckers (Chalberg kick)	MINN 56–49
Q4		PUR	Alstott 21 yard run (Bobich kick)	Tie 56–56
Q4	:08	MINN	Chalberg 18 yard field goal	MINN 59–56

- Scott Eckers 24/36, 402 Yds, 6 TD (school record)
- Chris Darkins 30 Rush, 149 Yds, TD
- Omar Douglas 8 Rec, 149 Yds, 5 TD (Big Ten record)

=== Wisconsin ===
Team	1	2	3	4	Total
Wisconsin	0	0	14	7	21
• Minnesota	7	14	0	7	28

- Date: October 23
- Location: Hubert H. Humphrey Metrodome, Minneapolis
- Game attendance: 64,798
- Game weather: Indoors (dome)

Scoring summary
1	MINN	Darkins 39 yard pass from Eckers (Chalberg kick)	MINN 7-0
2	MINN	Rios 27 yard pass from Eckers (Chalberg kick)	MINN 14-0
2	MINN	Rosga 55 yard interception return (Chalberg kick)	MINN 21-0
3	WIS	Moss 3 yard run (Hall kick)	MINN 21-7
3	WIS	Moss 15 yard run (Hall kick)	MINN 21-14
4	MINN	Darkins 2 yard run (Chalberg kick)	MINN 28-14
4	WIS	Dawkins 16 yard pass from Bevell (Hall kick)	MINN 28-21

== Roster ==
1993 Minnesota Golden Gophers football team roster
Players
Coaches
Offense

Pos.	#	Name	Class
RB	39	Antonio Carter	Sr
RB	44	Chris Darkins	So
WR	80	Omar Douglas	Sr
QB	18	Scott Eckers	Jr
OT	79	Fowlkes	So
C	65	Neil Fredenburg	Sr
TE	82	Paul Kratochvil	Fr
WR	4	Mike Long	Jr
TE	84	Justin Malvick	Fr

Defense

Pos.	#	Name	Class
DT	52	Doyle Cockrell	Jr
LB	20	Justin Conzemius	So
CB	22	Mike Gist	So
DT	90	Ed Hawthorne	Jr
CB	6	Rodney Heath	Fr
LB	91	Russ Heath	Sr
LB	94	Doug Hoefer	Sr
DE	92	Andy Kratochvil	Sr
LB	16	Craig Sauer	So
FS	27	Nate Tubbs	Sr
LB	98	Andrew Veit	Sr
SS	15	Don Williams	Fr
LB	38	Marquette Williams	So
LB	45	Lance Wolkow	Sr
LB	96	Todd Wolkow	Jr

Special teams

Pos.	#	Name	Class
LS	96	Andy Austin	Fr
P	1	Mike Brown	So
LS	41	Rod Ganther	Sr
K	3	Ryan Lee	Fr

Head coach

- Jim Wacker

Coordinators/assistant coaches

Legend

- (C) Team captain
- (S) Suspended
- (I) Ineligible
- Injured
- Redshirt

Roster
