= David Cobb (American football) =

American football player (born 1993)

Personal information
- Born: June 3, 1993 (age 33); Killeen, Texas, U.S.
- Listed height: 5 ft 11 in (1.80 m)
- Listed weight: 229 lb (104 kg)

Career information
- High school: Ellison (Killeen)
- College: Minnesota (2011–2014)
- NFL draft: 2015: 5th round, 138th overall pick

Career history

Playing
- Tennessee Titans (2015); Pittsburgh Steelers (2016)*; Chicago Bears (2016–2017)*; Saskatchewan Roughriders (2018)*; San Antonio Commanders (2019)
- * Offseason or practice squad member only

Coaching
- New Mexico State (2023) Director of scouting/NFL liaison; New Mexico State (2024) Running backs coach; New Mexico State (2025) Assistant head coach, general manager & running backs coach

Awards and highlights
- Second-team All-Big Ten (2014)

Career NFL statistics
- Rushing attempts: 52
- Rushing yards: 146
- Rushing touchdowns: 1
- Stats at Pro Football Reference
- Stats at CFL.ca

David Cottrell Cobb (born June 3, 1993) is an American former professional football player who was a running back in the National Football League (NFL). He played college football for the Minnesota Golden Gophers. He was selected by the Tennessee Titans in the fifth round of the 2015 NFL draft. He was also a member of the Pittsburgh Steelers and Chicago Bears of the NFL, the Saskatchewan Roughriders of the Canadian Football League (CFL), and the San Antonio Commanders of the Alliance of American Football (AAF).

== Early life ==
Cobb attended Ellison High School in Killeen, Texas. During his career rushed for 2,946 yards and 35 touchdowns. Cobb was a three-star recruit by Rivals.com. He signed to play college football at the University of Minnesota after National Signing Day in February 2011.

== College career ==
Cobb played in eight games his freshman and sophomore seasons, combining to rush for 65 yards on 11 carries. As a junior in 2013, Cobb played in 13 games with seven starts and led the team with 1,202 yards on 237 carries with seven touchdowns. He became the first Golden Gophers running back to rush for 1,000 yards since Amir Pinnix in 2006. Cobb returned as the starter his senior season in 2014. During the season, he broke Laurence Maroney's school record for rushing yards in a season. He finished the season with 1,626 yards on 314 carries with 13 touchdowns.

=== Statistics ===
Minnesota Golden Gophers
| Season | Rushing | | | | | Receiving | | |
| Season | Att | Yards | Avg | Yds/G | TD | Rec | Yards | TD |
| 2011 | 10 | 57 | 5.7 | 14.3 | 0 | 0 | 0 | 0 |
| 2012 | 1 | 8 | 8.0 | 1.6 | 0 | 1 | 3 | 0 |
| 2013 | 237 | 1,202 | 5.1 | 92.5 | 7 | 17 | 174 | 0 |
| 2014 | 314 | 1,626 | 5.2 | 125.1 | 13 | 16 | 162 | 0 |
| Career | 562 | 2,893 | 5.1 | 85.1 | 20 | 34 | 339 | 0 |

== Professional career ==
Pre-draft measurables
| Height | Weight | Arm length | Hand span | Wingspan | 40-yard dash | 10-yard split | 20-yard split | 20-yard shuttle | Three-cone drill | Vertical jump | Broad jump | Bench press |
|---|---|---|---|---|---|---|---|---|---|---|---|---|
| 5 ft 10 7/8 in (1.80 m) | 229 lb (104 kg) | 31 5/8 in (0.80 m) | 9 3/8 in (0.24 m) | 6 ft 4 3/8 in (1.94 m) | 4.73 s | 1.69 s | 2.72 s | 4.55 s | 7.01 s | 38.5 in (0.98 m) | 10 ft 1 in (3.07 m) | 17 reps |
All values from NFL Combine/Pro Day

=== Tennessee Titans ===
The Tennessee Titans selected Cobb in the fifth round (138th pick overall) of the 2015 NFL draft. On September 6, 2015, Cobb was placed on injured reserve with a designation to return. On November 11, 2015, Cobb was activated to the 53-man roster. On January 3, 2016, Cobb recorded his first touchdown of his career against the Indianapolis Colts. Cobb also ran for a career-high 73 yards on 19 carries.

The Titans released Cobb on August 30, 2016. Cobb ended his tenure with the Titans with 146 rushing yards on 52 carries. He appeared in seven games, but only started in one.

=== Pittsburgh Steelers ===
On September 7, 2016, the Pittsburgh Steelers signed Cobb to their practice squad. On October 11, 2016, Cobb was released from the Steelers' practice squad.

=== Chicago Bears ===
On October 25, 2016, Cobb was signed to the Chicago Bears' practice squad. He signed a reserve/future contract with the Bears on January 3, 2017. On May 1, 2017, Cobb was waived by the Bears.

=== Saskatchewan Roughriders ===
Cobb participated in The Spring League in 2018, and later signed with the Saskatchewan Roughriders of the Canadian Football League on June 4, 2018, in time for their final preseason game. After recording 2 rushes for 1 yard, Cobb was released on June 11. Cobb went back to The Spring League again for their summer showcase.

=== San Antonio Commanders ===
In September 2018, Cobb was signed by the San Antonio Commanders of the Alliance of American Football (AAF) for the 2019 season. In 8 games played prior to the AAF suspending operations, Cobb earned 137 yards on 35 rushes, and caught 3 passes for 11 yards. The league ceased operations in April 2019.

== Coaching career ==
=== New Mexico State ===
On January 16, 2025, Cobb was promoted as the assistant head coach, general manager and running backs coach at New Mexico State.

He was fired from the position prior to the start of the 2026 season.
