= Asad Abdul-Khaliq =

American football player (born 1980)

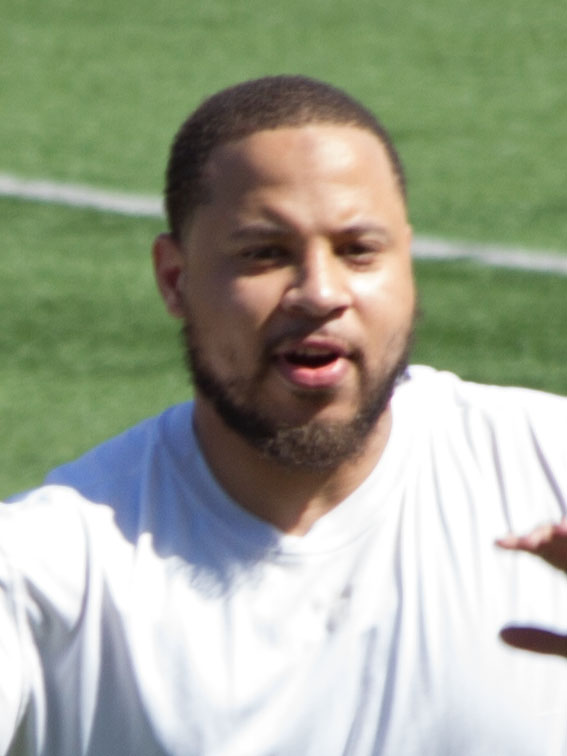
- Abdul-Khaliq in 2013

No. 8
- Position: Quarterback

Personal information
- Born: August 4, 1980 (age 46); Elizabeth, New Jersey, U.S.
- Listed height: 6 ft 1 in (1.85 m)
- Listed weight: 220 lb (100 kg)

Career information
- High school: Elizabeth
- College: Minnesota (2000–2003)
- NFL draft: 2004: undrafted

Career history
- Chicago Rush (2005–2006); New York Dragons (2007); Fort Wayne Fusion (2007)

Awards and highlights
- ArenaBowl champion (2006)

Career AFL statistics
- Passing attempts: 22
- Passing completions: 8
- Completion percentage: 36.4%
- Passing yards: 127
- TD–INT: 2–0
- Stats at ArenaFan.com

Asad Tajmmal Abdul-Khaliq (born August 4, 1980) is an American former professional football quarterback who played for the Chicago Rush and New York Dragons of the Arena Football League (AFL) and Fort Wayne Fusion of af2. He played college football for the Minnesota Golden Gophers.

== College career ==
Abdul-Khaliq was a four-year letter winner with Minnesota and was a two-year captain.

Abdul-Khaliq started as a freshman in 2000, although he eventually split quarterback duties during his freshman and sophomore years with junior-college transfer Travis Cole, with Cole seeing the majority of playing time.

In 2002, after Cole graduated, Abdul-Khaliq became the full-time starter as a junior in 2002 and helped lead the Gophers to an 8–5 record, topped off by a win over Arkansas in the Music City Bowl.

During Abdul-Khaliq's senior season in 2003, the Gophers got off to a 6–0 start and were nationally ranked before suffering a devastating comeback defeat at the hands of the Michigan Wolverines in a nationally televised game at the Hubert H. Humphrey Metrodome. The Gophers finished off the year 10–3, including a 31–30 victory over Oregon in the Sun Bowl. For the season Abdul-Khaliq passed for 2,401 yards, throwing for 17 touchdowns and scoring four more on the ground.

Over his entire Gophers career, Abdul-Khaliq completed 481-of-847 career passes for 6,660 yards and 55 touchdowns in 46 games. He added 1,158 yards and 16 touchdowns rushing. Asad set Golden Gopher career records for touchdown passes (55), passing yards (6,600), total offense (7,818 yards), completions (481) and career touchdown-to-interception ratio (2.1-1). As of 2008, he currently holds all those records except for passing yards and completions which were broken by his successor Bryan Cupito, who also tied Abdul-Khaliq's touchdown mark of 55. His 19 touchdown passes in 2002 were one shy of Mike Hohensee’s school record for touchdown passes in a season, and he tied Hohensee's record of 10 straight games with at least one touchdown pass. He was the first quarterback in Gopher history to pass for at least 12 touchdowns in three seasons.

== Professional career ==
=== Chicago Rush ===
Abdul-Khaliq signed a three-year contract with the Chicago Rush of the Arena Football League (AFL) on November 1, 2004. He was Chicago's third-string quarterback during his rookie year in 2005 but did not see any playing time.

=== New York Dragons ===
After playing in only two games for the Rush in 2006, Asad was traded to the New York Dragons. He did not start any games for New York in 2007, however he did play a little at defensive back, as the team finished the season 5–11 and failed to make the playoffs.

=== Fort Wayne Fusion ===
Abdul-Khaliq signed with the Fort Wayne Fusion of the af2 in 2007. In this time he received Division 1 (D1) offers.

== Personal life ==
His cousin, Todd Bowles, was the head coach for the New York Jets from 2015 to 2018 and is currently the head coach of the Tampa Bay Buccaneers.
