= Adam Weber =

American gridiron football player (born 1987)

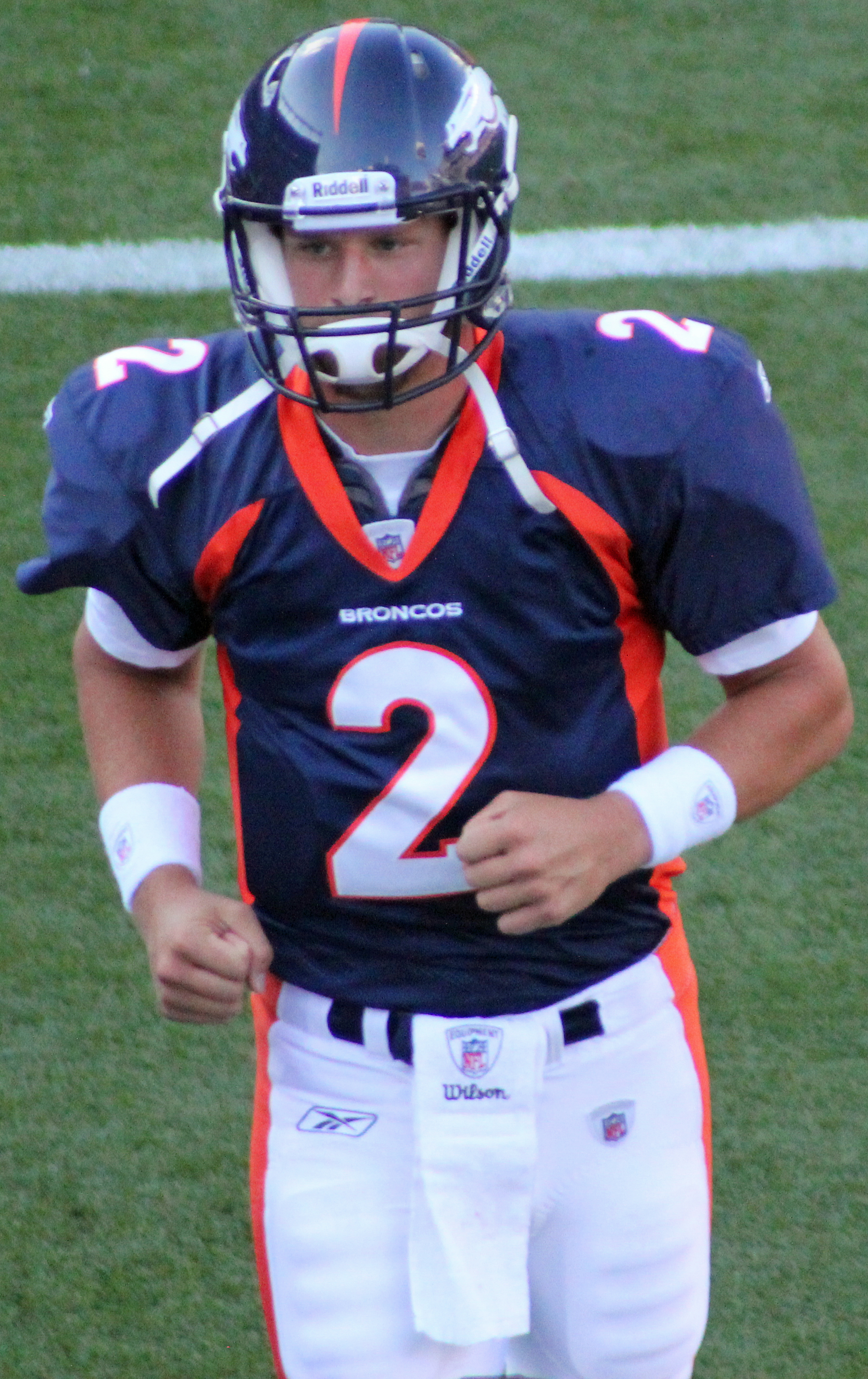
- Weber with the Denver Broncos in 2011

No. 2
- Position: Quarterback

Personal information
- Born: August 3, 1987 (age 39); Shoreview, Minnesota, U.S.
- Listed height: 6 ft 3 in (1.91 m)
- Listed weight: 211 lb (96 kg)

Career information
- High school: Mounds View (Arden Hills, Minnesota)
- College: Minnesota (2006–2010)
- NFL draft: 2011: undrafted

Career history

Playing
- Denver Broncos (2011–2012); Tampa Bay Buccaneers (2012–2013)*; Saskatchewan Roughriders (2014)*
- * Offseason or practice squad member only

Coaching
- Minnesota (2015–2016) Graduate assistant; UCLA (2017) Offensive analyst

Awards and highlights
- Second-team All-Big Ten (2008)
- Stats at Pro Football Reference

Adam Weber (born August 3, 1987) is an American former professional football quarterback who played in the National Football League (NFL). He played college football for the Minnesota Golden Gophers, where he finished his career as the school all-time leader in career passing yards and career touchdown passes. He was signed by the Denver Broncos as an undrafted free agent in 2011.

== Early life ==
A 2006 graduate of Mounds View High School in Arden Hills, Minnesota, Weber was a three–time all–state performer and all–conference selection, was a 2005 Star Tribune and KARE-11 All–Metro selection. Weber completed 137 of 250 passes for 1,913 yards and 14 touchdowns his senior campaign. Over his career he completed 320 passes on 598 attempts for 4,771 yards and 35 touchdowns, and also rushed for 1,519 yards and 28 touchdowns. Was a four-time letterwinner in both basketball and baseball and also lettered in track, as well as a four-year Academic Award winner. Weber was ranked as the 14th best dual–threat quarterback in the nation by Rivals.com and the 32nd–best overall quarterback by Scout.com.

== College career ==
=== 2007 ===
Prior to the start of the 2007 season, Weber beat out junior Tony Mortensen for the starting job in Tim Brewster's new spread offense. On the season Weber completed 258 of 449 pass attempts (58%) for 2895 yards and 24 touchdowns with 19 interceptions. He rushed for 617 yards and had 3,512 yards of total offense. The Gophers finished with a dismal 1-11 record. His completions, passing yards, passing touchdowns, total offense all set school records, and his interceptions tied a school record.

As a result of his efforts, Weber was named to the 2007 SportingNews.com and Rivals.com All-Big Ten freshman teams.

=== 2008 ===
Weber started out the season in an impressive showing against Northern Illinois where he threw for 298 yards, 2 touchdowns, on a 27-31 night. Against the Gophers' next opponent, Bowling Green, Weber threw for 233 yards, three touchdowns on a 21-25 night. On September 15 Weber led the Golden Gophers to a 35-23 victory over Montana State, improving to 3-0 on the year. Weber went 15-24 with 201 yards and one touchdown passing that day, and ran 8 times for 13 yards and a touchdown. On September 20, the Gophers got revenge on Florida Atlantic, winning 37-30. Weber was 19-24, with 235 yards, a touchdown, and his first interception of the year. He ran for 43 yards on 6 carries the same game. Weber and the Gophers suffered their first loss of the year the next week, falling to then 14th Ohio State. Weber tossed a touchdown, an interception, and finished 23-36 with 187 yards, and 6 rushes for -8 yards. Weber led the Gophers to a 7-1 start, but with star receiver Eric Decker out, the Gophers lost their final four games to finish 7-5, including a 55-0 loss to Iowa at home, and would lose their bowl game to finish 7-6. Regardless, improvement had been noticed.

=== 2009 ===
Weber started the season with a clutch victory at a rejuvenated Syracuse team, leading the Gophers to a 6-6 (3-5) season in what was up and down all year. The Gophers gave California a game, but were shut out by Penn State 20-0, Iowa 12-0, and nearly shut out by Ohio State but scoring a late touchdown to make it 38-7. The Gophers also struggled with South Dakota State, winning 16-13 over the lower division Jackrabbits. However, the Golden Gophers actually showed improvement over the previous year, upsetting Northwestern, who finished #4 in the Big Ten, 35-24, defeating Michigan State 42-34, and nearly defeating Wisconsin at TCF Bank Stadium, losing 31-28. Despite that, their accomplishments were also tainted by a 35-32 loss to a 3-9 Illinois team. However, Weber continued to set school records with the exception of the Penn State game in which he was held to a mere 101 yards passing.

=== 2010 ===
Weber threw his 56th touchdown pass in a 32-21 loss to USC on September 18, moving into first place among Minnesota quarterbacks for career touchdown passes. . On October 23, Weber became the 5th quarterback in Big Ten history to have 10,000 passing yards in a 33-21 loss to Penn State in which he had 299 passing yards. Weber won his final college game over Iowa, bringing Floyd of Rosedale home to end his career with the Golden Gophers.

== Professional career ==
=== Denver Broncos ===
Weber was signed by the Denver Broncos on July 26, 2011. The signing reunited Weber with his favorite college receiving target and former roommate, Eric Decker. Weber made his NFL debut August 21, 2011 in a preseason game vs the Arizona Cardinals in the 4th quarter. He completed his one and only pass, an 89-yard reception to practice squad receiver Eron Riley. Weber was waived by the Broncos during the final round of roster cuts on September 3, 2011 and signed to the practice squad the following day. Weber was speculated to be activated from Denver's practice squad; however, with the injury to CB Cassius Vaughn and waiving of QB Kyle Orton. LB Mike Mohamed and S Kyle McCarthy were signed from the practice squad instead. After the expiration of Brady Quinn's contract, Weber was signed to the active roster.

=== Tampa Bay Buccaneers ===
Weber was added to the practice squad of Tampa Bay on September 1, 2012. On August 26, 2013, he was waived by the Buccaneers.

=== Saskatchewan Roughriders ===
On April 25, 2014, it was announced that Weber had signed with the Saskatchewan Roughriders.

== Coaching career ==
In 2015, Weber returned to the University of Minnesota as a coach, where he spent the 2015 and 2016 seasons as a graduate assistant under offensive coordinator/quarterbacks coach Jay Johnson.

During the 2017 season, Weber worked as an analyst at UCLA under offensive coordinator Jedd Fisch, who had been Weber's offensive coordinator and quarterbacks coach at Minnesota during the 2009 season.

== Personal ==
Weber's father Bob Weber played football at Minnesota from 1974-1977.
