= Bryan Cupito =

American football player (born 1984)

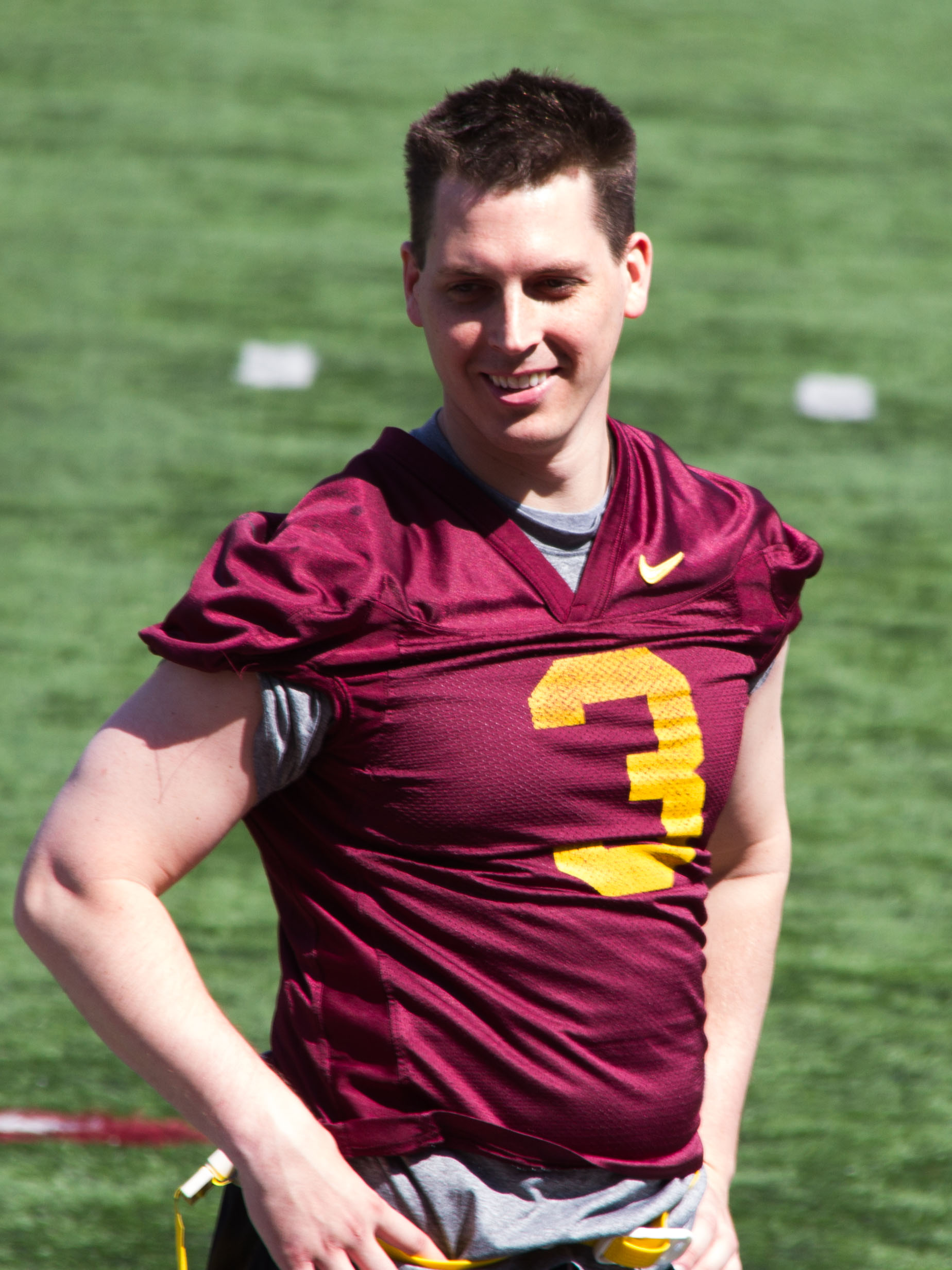
- Cupito participating in the 2013 Minnesota Gophers Alumni Flag Football Game.

No. 3
- Position: Quarterback

Personal information
- Born: June 29, 1984 (age 42)

Career information
- College: Minnesota (2004–2006)

Bryan Cupito (born June 29, 1984) is an American former football player. He was the starting quarterback for the Minnesota Golden Gophers for three years, from 2004 to 2006. He graduated from McNicholas High School in Cincinnati in 2002 before graduating from the University of Minnesota in 2006.

== Family ==
Many members of Cupito's family had ties to either college or professional-level sports. These include:

- Joe Cupito, Bryan's grandfather, who played for the Chicago Cubs
- Steve Cupito, Bryan's father, who played college football for the Louisville Cardinals
- Brad Cupito, Bryan's brother, who played college football for the Indiana Hoosiers

Bryan was the younger of his one other sibling, Brad Cupito. His parents are Steve Cupito and Erin Cupito, from Cincinnati;

His daughter Ava is committed to play basketball at Florida Atlantic University and will be a freshman there in 2027.

== College career ==
Cupito ranks third on Minnesota's career passing yards list, with 7,446. He also ranks third in Gophers history in touchdowns with 55.

== See also ==
- Minnesota Golden Gophers football statistical leaders
