= Travis Cole =

American football player (born 1979)

No. 10
- Position: Quarterback

Personal information
- Born: June 14, 1979 (age 47); Lake Oswego, Oregon, U.S.
- Listed height: 6 ft 3 in (1.91 m)
- Listed weight: 218 lb (99 kg)

Career information
- High school: Lakeridge (Lake Oswego)
- College: Minnesota
- NFL draft: 2002: undrafted

Career history
- Pittsburgh Steelers (2002)*; Arizona Rattlers (2006); Utah Blaze (2007)*; Rio Grande Valley Dorados (2008)
- * Offseason or practice squad member only

Career AFL statistics
- Comp. / Att.: 14 / 36
- Passing yards: 168
- TD–INT: 1–1
- QB rating: 49.31
- Stats at ArenaFan.com

Travis Cole (born June 14, 1979) is an American former professional football quarterback.

== Early life ==
As a fourth grader, Cole was a receiver on his local Pop Warner team in Lake Oswego, Oregon.

He is a 1997 graduate of Lakeridge High School in Lake Oswego, Oregon and played football and baseball for the Pacers. Cole was selected in the 52nd round of the 1997 Major League Baseball draft by the Toronto Blue Jays, but chose to attend Foothill College instead.

== Football career ==
Playing for Foothill College in Los Altos Hills, California, he completed 202 of 357 passes for 2,497 yards, 27 touchdowns, and 13 interceptions.

After completing his junior college career, Cole transferred to the University of Minnesota, where he played quarterback on the football team and pitcher on the baseball team.

He has since spent time on the rosters of the Pittsburgh Steelers, Arizona Rattlers, and Utah Blaze.

== Personal life ==
He has since retired from football and is a technology consultant for Microsoft Corporation in Redmond, Washington.
