= Amir Pinnix =

American football player (born 1985)

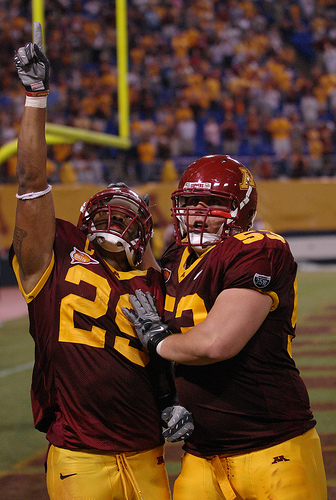

No. 29
- Position: Running back
- Class: Redshirt Senior

Personal information
- Born: November 30, 1985 (age 40); Newark, New Jersey, U.S.
- Listed height: 6 ft 0 in (1.83 m)
- Listed weight: 205 lb (93 kg)

Career information
- High school: Newark (NJ) Malcolm X Shabazz
- College: Minnesota (2003–2007)
- Stats at ESPN

Amir Pinnix (born November 30, 1985) is an American former college football running back for the Minnesota Golden Gophers. He was a prospect in the 2008 NFL draft, but went undrafted. He played high-school football at Malcolm X Shabazz High School in Newark, New Jersey.

== Early life ==
Amir attended Malcolm X Shabazz High School in Newark and was an honor student and a letterman in football, basketball, and track. In football, he was a three-time All-City, All-Area, and All-Conference selection, a two-time All-County selection, and as a senior, he was also named as an All-State selection. He graduated in 2003, earning an athletic scholarship to the University of Minnesota.

== College career ==
Amir played running back for the University of Minnesota for 4 years (2004 - 2007). In his junior year, he was the featured running back and gained 1,272 yards with 12 touchdowns. In his college career, he gained 2,643 yard and scored 19 touchdowns. As of September 2022, he is the 10th all-time leading rusher (yards gained) in Minnesota Gopher football history.
