= Ernie Wheelwright =

American gridiron football player (born 1984)

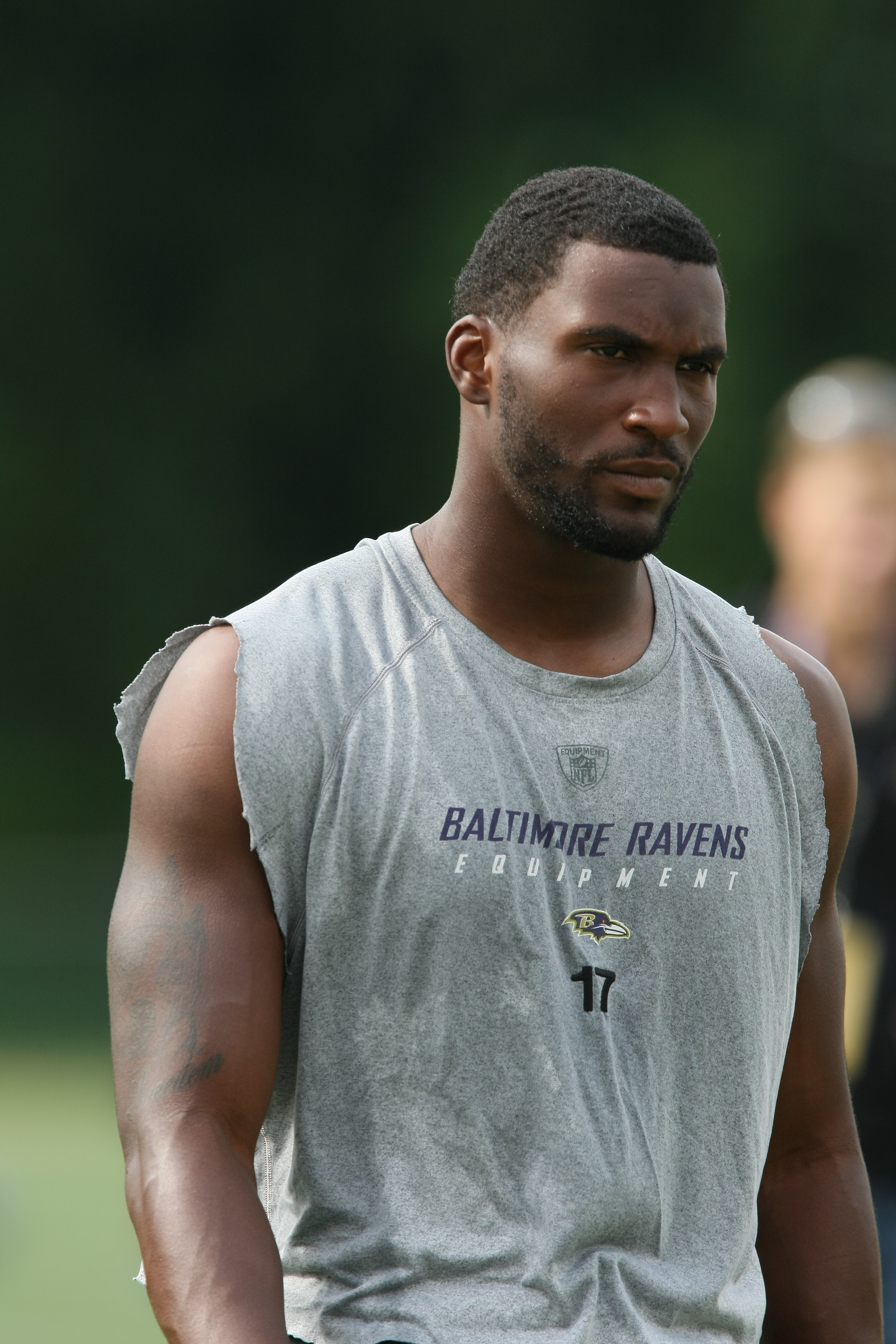
- Wheelwright in 2009

No. 12
- Position: Wide receiver

Personal information
- Born: July 10, 1984 (age 42); Columbus, Ohio
- Listed height: 6 ft 5 in (1.96 m)
- Listed weight: 220 lb (100 kg)

Career information
- High school: Walnut Ridge (Columbus, Ohio)
- College: Minnesota
- NFL draft: 2008: undrafted

Career history
- Baltimore Ravens (2008); Saskatchewan Roughriders (2011-2012)

Career CFL statistics
- Receptions: 2
- Receiving yards: 18
- Receiving touchdowns: 0
- Stats at Pro Football Reference

Ernest Lamont Wheelwright, IV (born July 10, 1984) is a former American gridiron football wide receiver . He most recently played for the Saskatchewan Roughriders of the Canadian Football League (CFL). He was signed by the Baltimore Ravens of the National Football League (NFL) as an undrafted free agent in 2008. He played college football at Minnesota. Ernie Wheelwright is one of the most celebrated wide receivers in University of Minnesota history. From 2004-2007, Wheelwright started 44 of his 49 career games played. He tied the school record for most consecutive games with a touchdown at a total of seven in 2006-2007. Wheelwright is No. 3 on the Gophers' all-time list for career receptions and career receiving yards. His numbers include 159 receptions along with 2,434 yards and 26 touchdowns. Which is second in school history for receiving touchdowns, also six 100-yard receiving games. Wheelwright was a consistent threat in the Minnesota passing attack in those four years and remains a popular name around the history of the program. Many consider him the fourth or third best wide receiver in school history.

Wheelwright is the grandson of actor and former New Orleans Saints running back Ernie Wheelwright. He is the older brother of Robert Wheelwright, a wide receiver for the University Of Wisconsin-Madison.

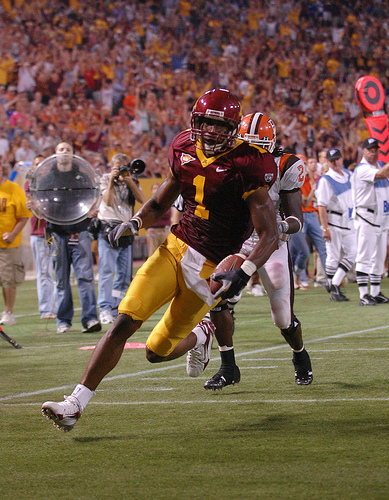
Wheelwright scoring a touchdown against Bowling Green in 2007.
