= William VanDeSteeg =

American football player (born 1985)

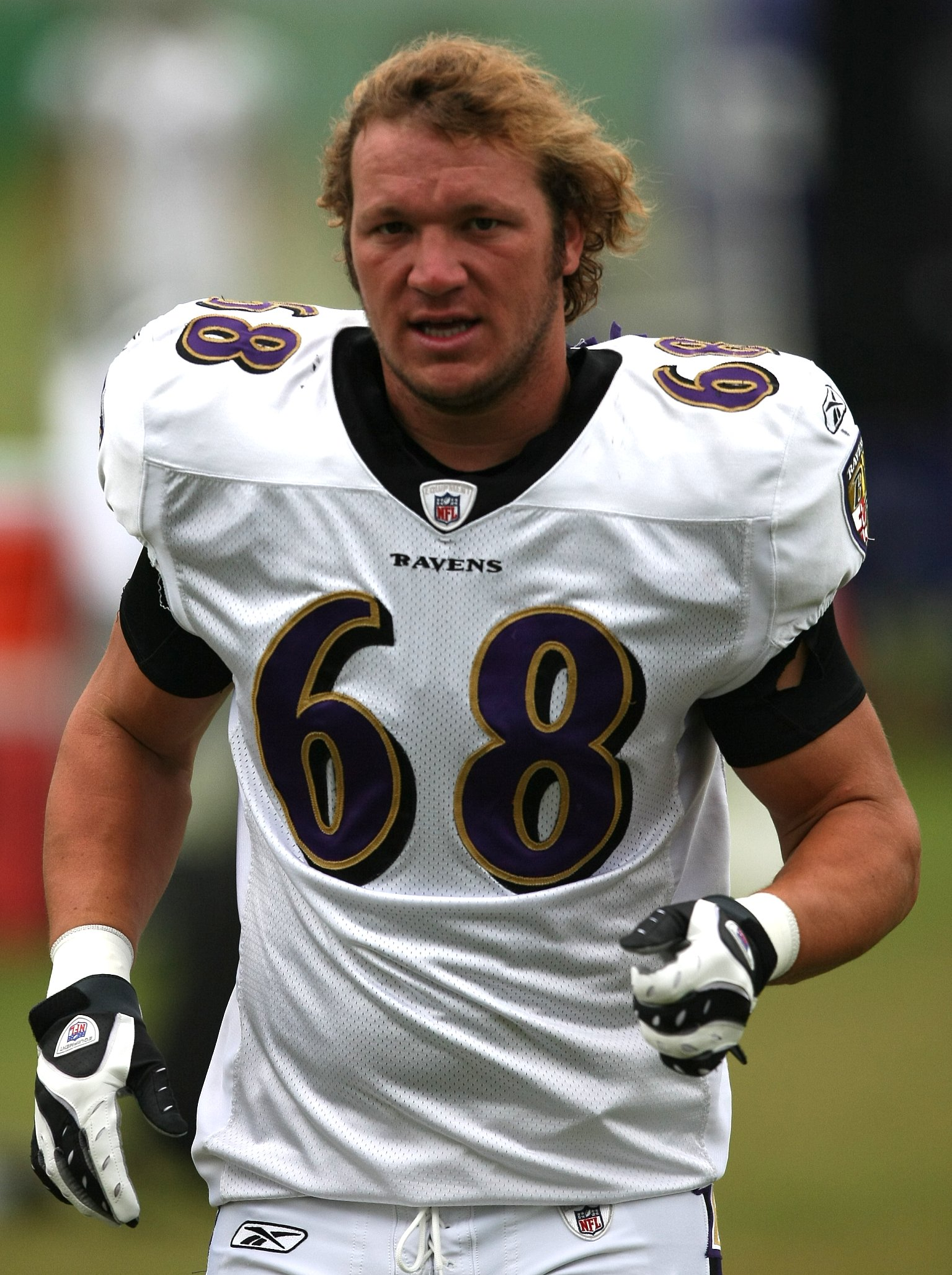
- VanDeSteeg in 2009.

No. 68
- Position: Linebacker

Personal information
- Born: September 22, 1985 (age 41); Silver Lake, Minnesota
- Listed height: 6 ft 4 in (1.93 m)
- Listed weight: 256 lb (116 kg)

Career information
- College: Minnesota
- NFL draft: 2009: undrafted

Career history
- Baltimore Ravens (2009)*; Hartford Colonials (2010)*
- * Offseason or practice squad member only

William VanDeSteeg (born September 22, 1985) is an American former football linebacker. He was signed by the Baltimore Ravens as an undrafted free agent in 2009. He played college football at Minnesota.

VanDeSteeg was briefly a member of the Hartford Colonials, for whom he signed on June 15, 2010. He was released on July 14.
