= Ryan Thelwell =

American football player

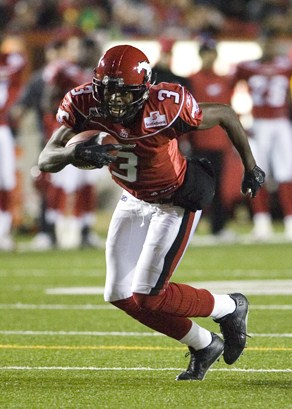
- Thelwell with the Calgary Stampeders in 2007

No. 3, 8
- Position: Wide receiver

Personal information
- Born: April 6, 1973 (age 53); Montego Bay, Jamaica
- Listed height: 6 ft 1 in (1.85 m)
- Listed weight: 193 lb (88 kg)

Career information
- College: Minnesota
- NFL draft: 1998: 7th round, 215th overall pick
- CFL draft: 1998: 2nd round, 9th overall pick

Career history
- 1998: San Francisco 49ers*
- 1998: San Diego Chargers
- 1999: Seattle Seahawks*
- 1999: Jacksonville Jaguars*
- 1999: Pittsburgh Steelers
- 2000: New Orleans Saints*
- 2001: Denver Broncos*
- 2001–2006: BC Lions
- 2007–2010: Calgary Stampeders
- 2011: BC Lions
- * Offseason or practice squad member only

Awards and highlights
- 3× Grey Cup champion (94th, 96th, 99th); 2× CFL West All-Star (2004, 2005); Second-team All-Big Ten (1996)

Career NFL statistics
- Receptions: 16
- Receiving yards: 268
- Receiving touchdowns: 1
- Stats at Pro Football Reference

Career CFL statistics
- Receptions: 436
- Receiving yards: 6,670
- Receiving touchdowns: 39
- Stats at CFL.ca

Ryan Thelwell (born April 6, 1973) is a Jamaican-Canadian former professional football wide receiver who played in the National Football League (NFL) and Canadian Football League (CFL). He was selected ninth overall by the BC Lions in the 1998 CFL draft and 215th overall by the San Francisco 49ers in the 1998 NFL draft. Thelwell played college football with the University of Minnesota.

== Early life and college ==
Thelwell was born in Montego Bay, Jamaica and grew up in London, Ontario, Canada. He graduated from London Catholic Central High School in 1993 and played on the football, volleyball, basketball, and track teams. Thelwell attended the University of Minnesota. After redshirting a year, Thelwell played wide receiver on the Minnesota Golden Gophers football team from 1994 to 1997 seasons. In 7 games in his freshman season (1994), Thelwell caught 24 passes (including 3 touchdowns) for 406 yards and had a long reception of 80. In 1995, Thelwell caught 58 passes for 775 yards and 6 touchdowns. In 1996, Thelwell made 54 catches for 1,051 yards and 5 touchdowns. He was a second-team All-Big Ten Conference media selection and honorable mention all-Big Ten coaches' selection.

== Professional career ==
=== National Football League ===
Thelwell was drafted 215th overall by the San Francisco 49ers in the seventh round of the 1998 NFL draft, but failed to stick with the team following training camp. He then signed with the San Diego Chargers and played in six games, starting three. He caught his first pass of the season against the Baltimore Ravens on November 15, 1998, and scored his first and only touchdown of the season on December 27 in the season finale against the Arizona Cardinals. Thelwell caught a crucial, 30-yard touchdown pass on 4th-and-20 with 16 seconds left that would tie the game at 13 after the extra point. However, San Diego would lose 16–13. Only Thelwell caught more passes than Arizona linebacker Kwamie Lassiter intercepted passes from San Diego quarterback Craig Whelihan. One of Lassiter's interceptions bounced off Thelwell's hands. For the 1998 season with San Diego, Thelwell caught 16 passes for 268 yards. He signed with the Pittsburgh Steelers the following season.

=== Canadian Football League ===
Having been drafted 9th overall by the BC Lions, Thelwell signed with the defending Grey Cup champions on June 6, 2001. Thelwell would go on to play the next six seasons with the Lions, accumulating 335 receptions for 4981 yards and 30 touchdowns. He was named a West Division All-Star in 2004 and 2005, while recording his first 1000-yard season in 2005. He saw a drop-off in production in 2006 with 625 receiving yards, he was a key contributor in the playoffs, recording nine catches for 83 yards, leading to a Lions' win in the 94th Grey Cup.

Following his Grey Cup win, Thelwell became a free agent and elected to sign with the Calgary Stampeders on February 16, 2007. Over four seasons in Calgary, he caught 106 passes for 1747 yards and nine touchdowns. He played in the Stampeders 96th Grey Cup victory over the Montreal Alouettes, the same team that lost to the Lions in 2006. On January 25, 2011, Thelwell announced his retirement from professional football.

Due to an injury sustained by Akeem Foster, the Lions brought Thelwell out of retirement and signed him on October 25, 2011. Thelwell was on the 46-man roster when the team won the 99th Grey Cup, earning him his third Grey Cup championship in six seasons. Almost immediately after the win, Thelwell again announced his retirement on December 1, 2011.

== Personal life ==
Thelwell moved to London, Ontario with his parents when he was four years old.

Thelwell also made an appearance at the William Aberhart Trojans 2007 football banquet in Calgary on November 16, 2007. Thelwell was inducted into the City of London Sports Hall of Fame in November 2015.

He is married with four kids.
