= Jack Brewer =

American football player (born 1979)

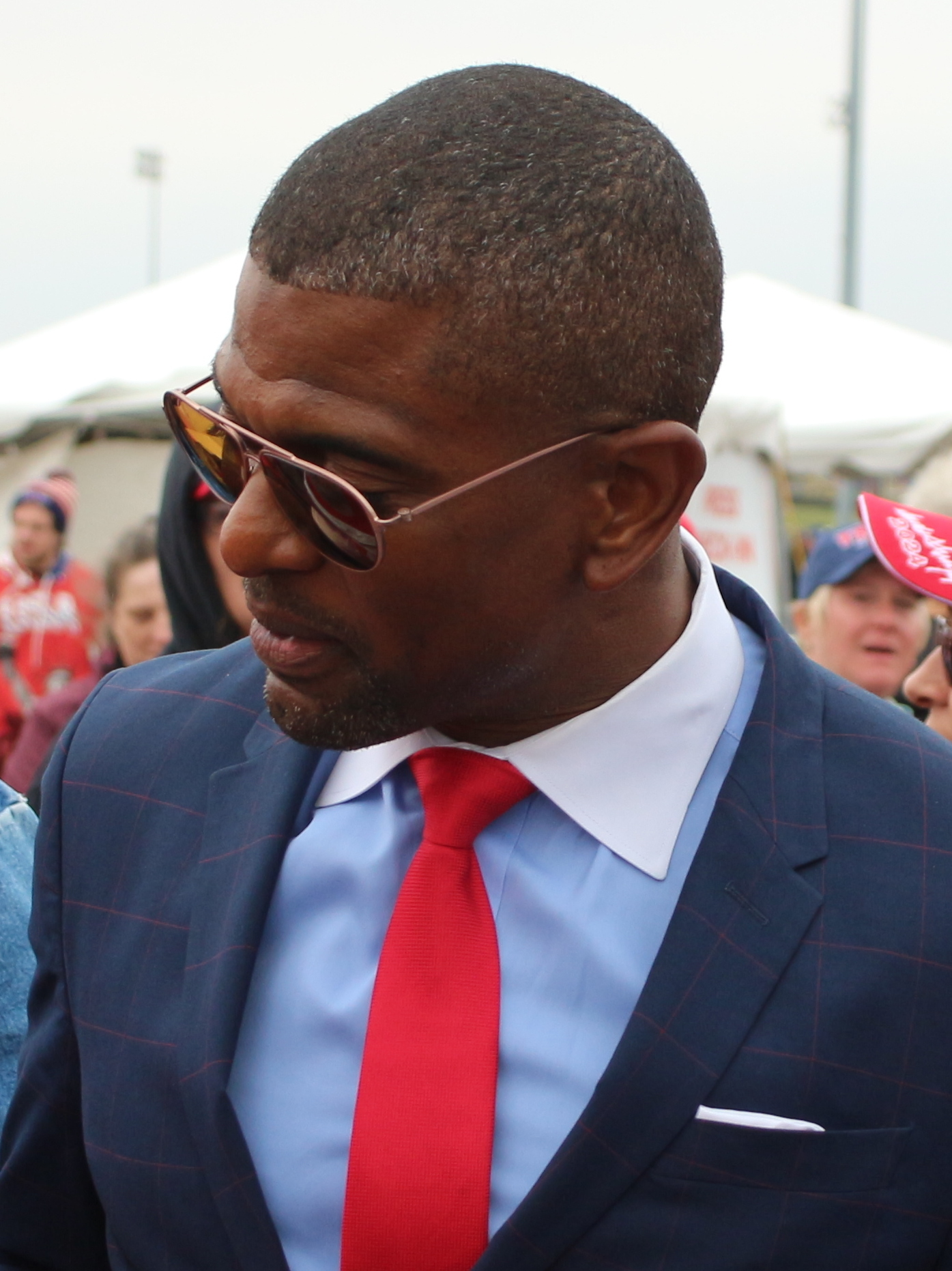
- Brewer in 2022

No. 42, 31
- Position: Safety

Personal information
- Born: January 8, 1979 (age 47); Fort Worth, Texas, U.S.
- Listed height: 6 ft 0 in (1.83 m)
- Listed weight: 194 lb (88 kg)

Career information
- High school: Grapevine (Grapevine, Texas)
- College: SMU (1997); Minnesota (1998–2001)
- NFL draft: 2002: undrafted

Career history
- Minnesota Vikings (2002–2003); New York Giants (2004); Philadelphia Eagles (2005); Arizona Cardinals (2006)

Career NFL statistics
- Total tackles: 58
- Pass deflections: 2
- Interceptions: 2
- Stats at Pro Football Reference

Jack Brewer (born January 8, 1979) is an American former professional football player who was a safety in the National Football League (NFL) for the Minnesota Vikings, New York Giants, Philadelphia Eagles, and Arizona Cardinals. He played college football for the Minnesota Golden Gophers.

After his playing career, Brewer began a business career. He also became involved in politics as a supporter of President Donald Trump.

== Early life ==
Born in Fort Worth, Texas, Brewer grew up in nearby Grapevine and graduated from Grapevine High School in 1997. Brewer lettered in football and track in high school. As a senior wide receiver in 1996, Brewer had 48 catches for 776 yards and nine touchdowns on a 15–0 team that won the University Interscholastic League 4A state title.

== College career ==
As a freshman, Brewer attended Southern Methodist University (SMU) where he played wide receiver and was an All-American Candidate and a Disney World Record Holder for track. He had 19 receptions for 352 yards and four touchdowns in the season for the SMU Mustangs in 1997. Brewer transferred to the University of Minnesota after one year at SMU. At Minnesota, Brewer redshirted the 1998 season per NCAA transfer rules before starting 10 games at free safety as a redshirt sophomore in 1999.

In 2000, Brewer returned to wide receiver as a junior and was third on the team with 22 catches for 286 yards. He switched to defensive back in 2001 and finished that season with 155 tackles, the fourth highest single-season total in school history.

Senior captain Brewer was a first-team selection at defensive back by the media after leading the Big Ten Conference in tackles with 14.1 per game and 16.2 per game for Big Ten contests. He earned the Carl Eller Award for outstanding defensive player, and the Paul Giel Award for most unselfish player with most concern for the university. He was also selected to play in the East–West Shrine Game.

Brewer earned his bachelor's and master's degrees from the University of Minnesota.

== Professional sports career ==
Pre-draft measurables
Height	Weight	Arm length	Hand span	40-yard dash	10-yard split	20-yard split	20-yard shuttle	Three-cone drill	Vertical jump	Broad jump	Bench press
6 ft 0 in (1.83 m)	194 lb (88 kg)	31 3/4 in (0.81 m)	9 in (0.23 m)	4.58 s	1.53 s	2.57 s	4.24 s	6.90 s	37.0 in (0.94 m)	10 ft 2 in (3.10 m)	12 reps
All values from NFL Scouting Combine

In 2002, Brewer was signed by the Minnesota Vikings as a free agent. In his first year with the Vikings, Brewer played in 15 games and had one start. He led the team with 26 special teams tackles, five tackles against the Buffalo Bills which tied him for second most in a game in team history and the most special teams tackles in a game since Harold Morrow's five against Tampa Bay. Brewer had both of his two career interceptions that same year.

In Brewer's second year with the Vikings, he played in six games; he was inactive for the first three games of the season after suffering a chest injury in preseason. On October 26, 2003, he blocked a Jeff Feagles punt against the New York Giants – the Vikings' first blocked punt since 1989. The Vikings waived Brewer on March 17, 2004.

On March 18, 2004, Brewer signed with the Giants off waivers.

Signing with the team on November 16 to replace the injured Sean Considine, Brewer played in six games with the Philadelphia Eagles in 2005 and finished tied for fifth on the team with 15 special teams tackles and twice led the team with four special teams tackles.

Brewer signed a one-year contract with the Arizona Cardinals on April 28, 2006. However, he was placed on injured reserve on September 2.

== Business career ==
After leaving the NFL, Brewer became a wealth manager at the global private client group of Merrill Lynch. In 2009, Brewer founded Brewer Group Inc., which has been variously described as a consulting firm and an investment advisory firm.

In August 2020, the U.S. Securities and Exchange Commission (SEC) filed civil insider trading charges against Brewer in the United States District Court for the Southern District of New York. The SEC alleged that Brewer sold 100,000 shares in a penny stock, COPsync, after receiving confidential information indicating that the share price was likely to drop, and that Brewer "profited by approximately $35,000 more than he otherwise would have." Brewer did consulting work for COPsync, a company that developed a messaging system for law enforcement. Brewer also recruited other athletes to promote the company. COPsync went bankrupt in 2017, and in 2018 the SEC revoked the registration of the company's stock.

In 2023, the SEC refiled its case. In 2025, a New York federal judge, Jennifer H. Rearden, ruled that Brewer committed insider trading by selling the COPsync stocks. The SEC sought $160,000 in penalties from Brewer.

== Political advocacy ==
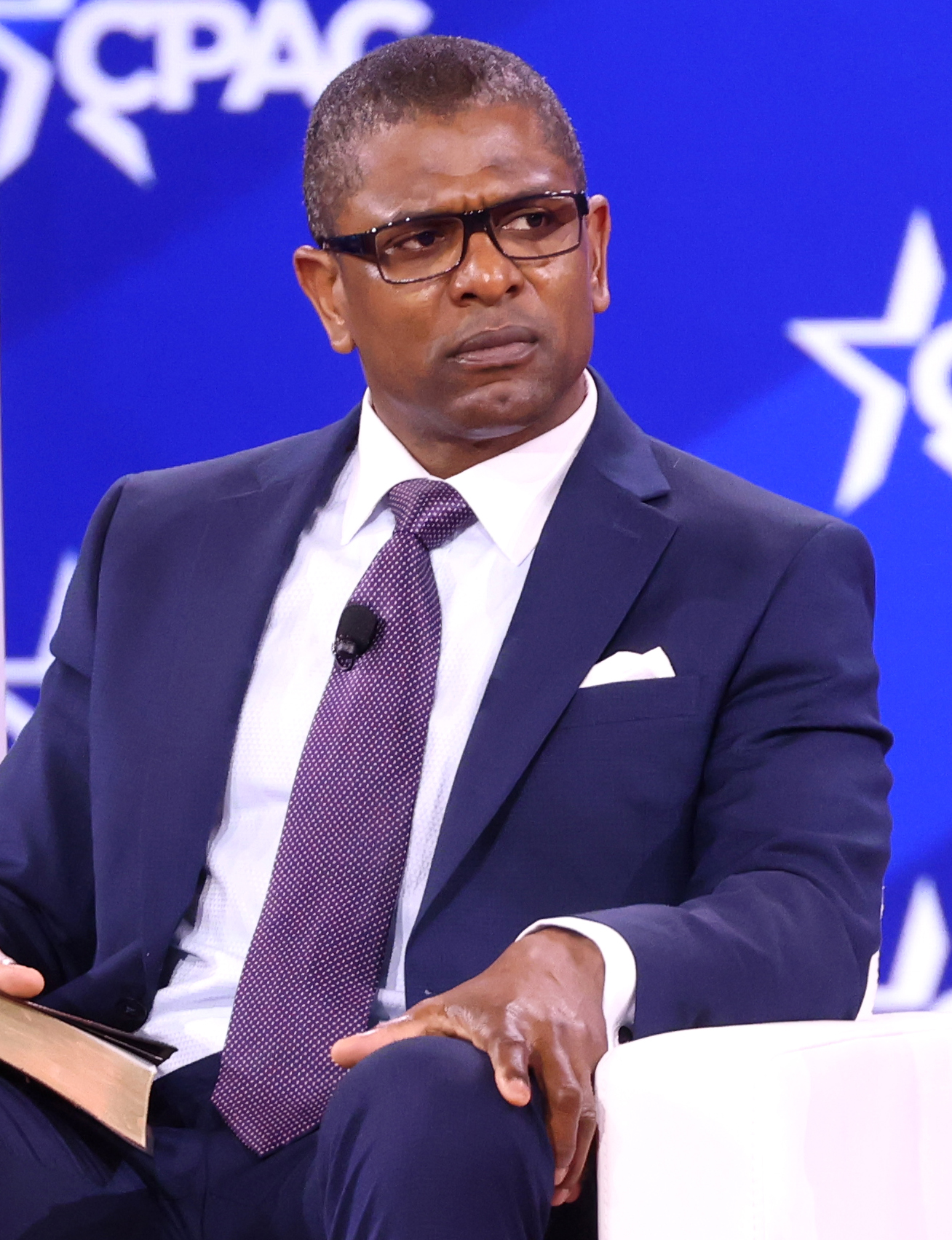
Brewer at the 2025 Conservative Political Action Conference

Brewer once supported Barack Obama, but later pledged support for Donald Trump. He met with Trump at the Bedminster Golf resort in June 2019. Brewer frequently appeared on Fox News to promote Trump, became a member of the "Black Voices for Trump" group, and tweeted that "Trump has done more for blacks than any [President] since Lincoln." Brewer spoke at the 2020 Republican National Convention.

In 2020, Brewer was given a four-year appointment by the White House as its nominee on the Congressional Committee for the Social Status of Black Men and Boys. Brewer helped Lil Wayne and Kodak Black receive their pardons from President Trump. In 2021, Brewer was named chair of the Opportunity Now Center at the America First Policy Institute.

== Personal life ==
Brewer is a Christian, stating in an interview that "[m]y journey was one where I had to use life experiences to bring me closer to Jesus Christ."
