= Tyrone Carter =

American football player (born 1976)

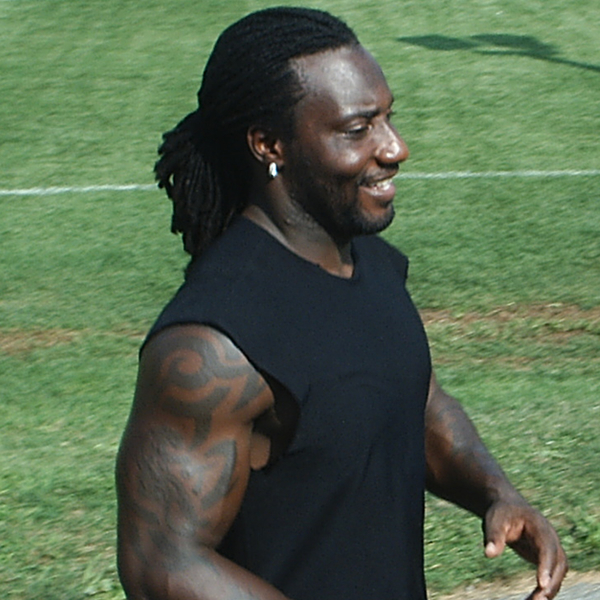
- Carter in 2007

No. 37, 22, 23, 31
- Position: Safety

Personal information
- Born: March 31, 1976 (age 50); Fort Lauderdale, Florida, U.S.
- Listed height: 5 ft 8 in (1.73 m)
- Listed weight: 190 lb (86 kg)

Career information
- High school: Blanche Ely (Pompano Beach, Florida)
- College: Minnesota (1996–1999)
- NFL draft: 2000: 4th round, 118th overall pick

Career history
- Minnesota Vikings (2000–2002); New York Jets (2003); Minnesota Vikings (2004)*; Pittsburgh Steelers (2004–2009); Washington Redskins (2010)*; San Diego Chargers (2010)
- * Offseason or practice squad member only

Awards and highlights
- 2× Super Bowl champion (XL, XLIII); Jim Thorpe Award (1999); Jack Tatum Trophy (1999); Consensus All-American (1999); Second-team All-American (1998); 2× First-team All-Big Ten (1998, 1999); Second-team All-Big Ten (1997)

Career NFL statistics
- Tackles: 483
- Interceptions: 9
- Interception yards: 170
- Pass deflections: 31
- Forced fumbles: 8
- Fumble recoveries: 5
- Sacks: 5.5
- Defensive touchdowns: 3
- Stats at Pro Football Reference

Tyrone M. Carter (born March 31, 1976) is an American former professional football player who was a safety in the National Football League (NFL). He played college football for the Minnesota Golden Gophers, earning All-American honors and winning several national awards. He played for the Minnesota Vikings, New York Jets, Pittsburgh Steelers, and San Diego Chargers. Carter was also a member of the Washington Redskins but did not play in any games for them.

== Early life ==
Carter was born in Fort Lauderdale, Florida. At Blanche Ely High School in Pompano Beach, Florida, Carter was named Miami Sun-Sentinel all-county defensive first-team choice as a senior. He also received Miami Herald all-county offensive first team honors as a running back, gaining 1,349 yards and scoring 23 touchdowns his senior year.

== College career ==
Carter attended the University of Minnesota, where he majored in sociology and played for the Golden Gophers. He was a first-team All-American in 1998, and a consensus first-team All-American in 1999. He also won the 1999 Jim Thorpe Award for best defensive back in college football, and was a finalist for the 1999 Bronko Nagurski Trophy which is given to the premier defensive player in the country. He also earned the Carl Eller Award twice, which is given to the Gophers defensive player of the year. In 1998, Carter was named first team All Big Ten conference by both the coaches and the media. During his football career at Minnesota, he recorded 584 tackles (414 solo), which are both NCAA Division I-A records.

== Professional career ==
Pre-draft measurables
Height	Weight	Arm length	Hand span	40-yard dash	10-yard split	20-yard split	20-yard shuttle	Three-cone drill	Vertical jump	Broad jump	Bench press
5 ft 7 5/8 in (1.72 m)	190 lb (86 kg)	30 in (0.76 m)	9 1/8 in (0.23 m)	4.48 s	1.53 s	2.60 s	4.19 s	6.75 s	41.0 in (1.04 m)	10 ft 1 in (3.07 m)	16 reps
All values from NFL Combine

=== Minnesota Vikings ===
Tyrone Carter was selected in the fourth round (122nd overall) in the 2000 NFL draft out of the University of Minnesota by the Minnesota Vikings. On June 30, 2000, he signed a 3-year contract with the Vikings and had 40 tackles in his rookie year. He played 3 seasons with the Vikings and would return to the team later in his career when on March 11, 2004, he agreed to terms with his former team. However, on September 5, 2004, Carter was placed on the Vikings injured reserve list after spraining his knee during the second preseason game, and was expected to be out until October. On September 18, he was taken off the IR and released.

=== New York Jets ===
On April 14, 2003, Carter signed as an unrestricted free agent with the New York Jets, where he played for only one season and recorded career highs in tackles (88) and interceptions (2). On March 1, 2004, he was cut along with longtime Jet linebacker Mo Lewis and safety Sam Garnes in order to free up salary cap space.

=== Pittsburgh Steelers ===
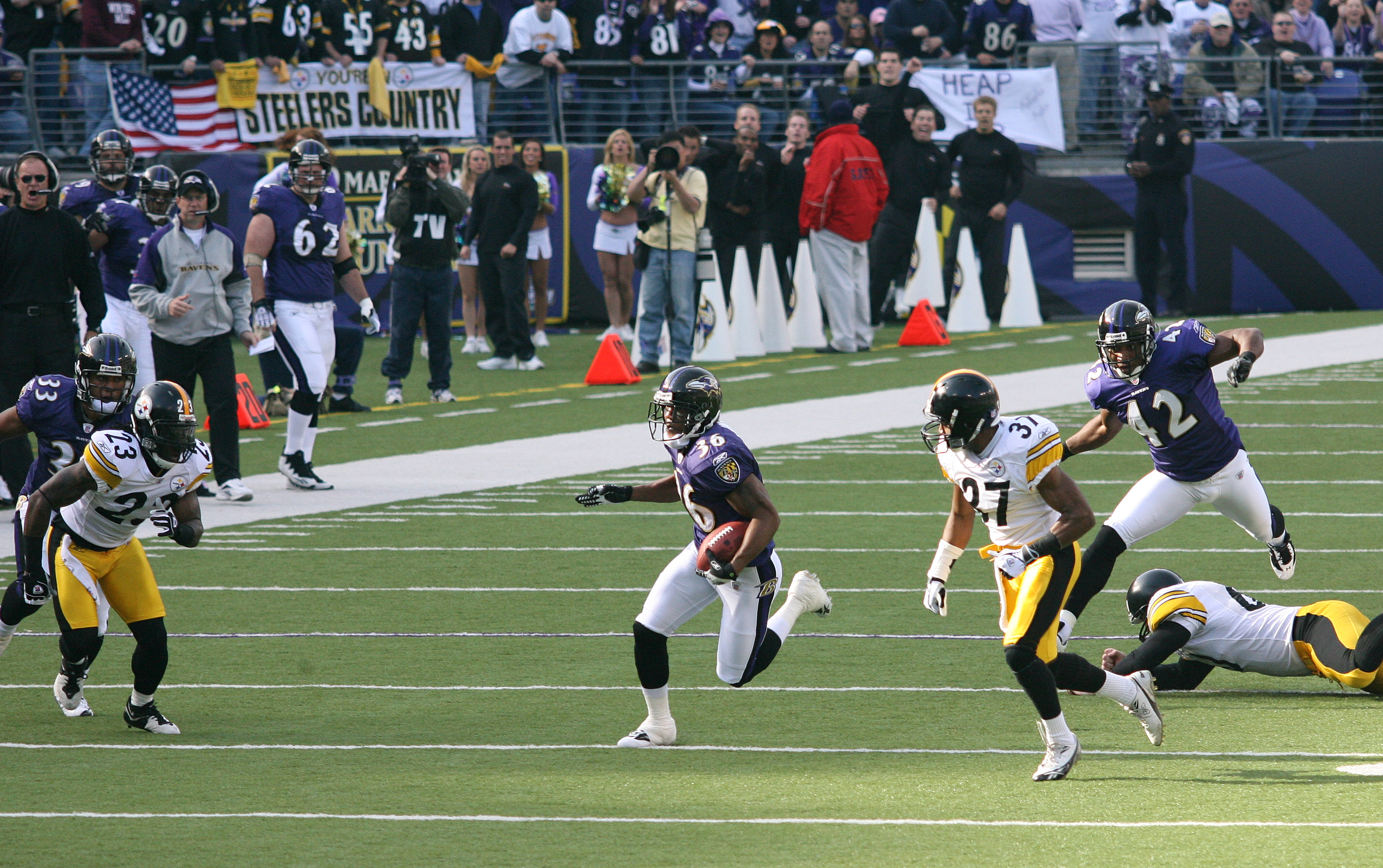
Carter (23) playing against the Baltimore Ravens in 2006.

On October 20, 2004, he signed with the Pittsburgh Steelers, where he played in 9 games, recording seven tackles. On February 23, 2005, he declared free agency, but on April 5, 2005, he re-signed as an unrestricted free agent to a 2-year contract.

In 2005, Carter appeared in all 20 games (16 regular season, 4 postseason) for the world champion Pittsburgh Steelers. He recorded 3 tackles and a pass defensed in Super Bowl XL.

The Steelers re-signed Carter on March 27, 2007, to a 3-year, 2.5 million dollar contract, which included a $280,000 signing bonus. After playing the Denver Broncos in week 7, starting safety Ryan Clark suffered a life-threatening illness in which Clark had to have his spleen and gall bladder removed. Tyrone Carter stepped in to replace Clark for the remainder of the season, starting 5 games in his absence.

The 2008 season saw Carter appear in all 16 regular-season games for the fourth straight season. He was named AFC Defensive Player of the Week for the first time in week 17 against Cleveland, in a game in which he had 4 tackles, 2 passes defensed, 2 interceptions and 1 touchdown. In Super Bowl XLIII Carter recorded two solo tackles and earned his second Super Bowl ring.

Carter entered 2009 as the third safety on the Steelers depth chart behind Troy Polamalu and Ryan Clark. When Polamalu was injured in the first game of the season against the Tennessee Titans, Carter replaced him in the starting lineup over the next four games. When the Steelers returned to Denver for the first time since Ryan Clark's injury, Coach Tomlin decided to deactivate Clark as a precaution and Carter started in his place. In this game, Carter had two interceptions, returning the first 48 yards for a touchdown. His second interception came with less than a minute to play and sealed the victory for the Steelers. Carter was named AFC Defensive Player of the Week for his effort. When Troy Polamalu was re-injured in a game against the Cincinnati Bengals, Carter took his place and started at the position for the rest of the season due to the injury.

=== Washington Redskins ===
On August 23, 2010, Carter was signed by the Washington Redskins. On September 4, 2010, Carter was released.

=== San Diego Chargers ===
On October 5, 2010, Carter was signed by the San Diego Chargers to replace suspended safety Steve Gregory.

== NFL career statistics ==
Regular season			Tackles				Interceptions					Kickoff returns				
Season	Team	GP	Total	Solo	Ast	Sack	PDef	INT	Yds	TD	Lng	Ret	Yds	Avg	Lg	TD
2000	MIN	15	37	28	9	0.0	0	0	0	0	--	17	389	22.9	38	0
2001	MIN	15	58	54	4	1.0	6	0	0	0	--	--	--	--	--	--
2002	MIN	16	57	48	9	0.0	6	1	13	0	13	17	350	20.6	34	0
2003	NYJ	16	88	64	24	0.0	3	2	37	0	23	--	--	--	--	--
2004	PIT	9	7	7	0	0.0	0	0	0	0	--	--	--	--	--	--
2005	PIT	16	24	18	6	1.0	3	1	3	0	3	--	--	--	--	--
2006	PIT	16	43	31	12	2.0	2	0	0	0	--	--	--	--	--	--
2007	PIT	16	56	40	16	0.5	2	0	0	0	--	--	--	--	--	--
2008	PIT	16	16	12	4	0.0	4	3	64	1	32T	1	16	16.0	16	0
2009	PIT	16	61	49	12	1.0	4	2	53	1	48T	--	--	--	--	--
2010	SD	7	12	11	1	0.0	0	0	0	0	--	--	--	--	--	--
Total	11 seasons	158	459	362	97	5.5	29	9	170	2	48T	35	755	21.6	38	0

== Personal life ==
Carter and his wife April have two biological children: Tyra and Tyree. Carter also has three children from previous relationships: Tyrone Jr., Tristan, and April.

His brother, Tank Carter, was sentenced to five years in prison for not appearing at court for a charge of driving with a revoked license. Rather than report to prison on January 6, 2006, where he was to serve a 6-month prison sentence, he instead traveled to watch his brother play 3 road playoff games and then in Super Bowl XL. Tank had originally been scheduled to report to jail on December 8, 2005, but Circuit Judge Stanton S. Kaplan allowed him an extra month to spend the holidays with his family and children. When he finally turned himself in on February 13, one week after Super Bowl XL, the judge added 54 months to his original 6-month sentence.
