= Ron Johnson (wide receiver, born 1980) =

American football player (born 1980)

Ron Johnson II
No. 83
- Position: Wide receiver

Personal information
- Born: May 23, 1980 (age 46); Detroit, Michigan, U.S.
- Listed height: 6 ft 3 in (1.91 m)
- Listed weight: 230 lb (104 kg)

Career information
- High school: Martin Luther King (Detroit)
- College: Minnesota
- NFL draft: 2002: 4th round, 123rd overall pick

Career history
- Baltimore Ravens (2002–2004); Chicago Bears (2005)*; Washington Redskins (2006)*; Calgary Stampeders (2006); Orlando Predators (2007–2008); Cleveland Gladiators (2008)
- * Offseason or practice squad member only

Awards and highlights
- First-team All-Big Ten (2000); Second-team All-Big Ten (2001)

Career NFL statistics
- Receptions: 11
- Receiving yards: 126
- Receiving TDs: 1
- Stats at Pro Football Reference

Career AFL statistics
- Receptions: 177
- Receiving yards: 1,741
- Receiving TDs: 23
- Stats at ArenaFan.com
- Stats at CFL.ca (archive)

Ron Johnson (born May 23, 1980) is an American former professional football player in the National Football League (NFL), Canadian Football League (CFL) and Arena Football League (AFL). He played college football for the Minnesota Golden Gophers and was selected by the Baltimore Ravens in the fourth round of the 2002 NFL draft with the 123rd overall pick. In his NFL debut, he scored an eight-yard receiving touchdown against the Carolina Panthers in a 10–7 loss.

Johnson was also a member of the Chicago Bears, Washington Redskins, Calgary Stampeders, Orlando Predators, and Cleveland Gladiators.

Johnson's father, Ron Johnson Sr., played in the NFL as a defensive back for the Pittsburgh Steelers, winning two Super Bowls between 1978 and 1984.
