= Cory Sauter =

American football player and coach (born 1974)

Personal information
- Born: November 21, 1974 (age 51); Hutchinson, Minnesota, U.S.
- Listed height: 6 ft 4 in (1.93 m)
- Listed weight: 215 lb (98 kg)

Career information
- High school: Hutchinson
- College: Minnesota
- NFL draft: 1998: undrafted

Career history

Playing
- Arizona Cardinals (1998)*; Detroit Lions (1999–2000); Barcelona Dragons (2000); Indianapolis Colts (2001–2002); Chicago Bears (2002); Indianapolis Colts (2003)
- * Offseason or practice squad member only

Coaching
- Hamburg Sea Devils (2006) Quarterbacks coach; Minnesota (2006) Graduate assistant; Berlin Thunder (2007) Quarterbacks coach; Southwest Minnesota State (2008) Quarterbacks coach; Southwest Minnesota State (2009) Offensive coordinator-Quarterbacks coach; Southwest Minnesota State (2010–2021) Head coach

Head coaching record
- Career: 45–77
- Stats at Pro Football Reference

Cory Justin Sauter (born November 21, 1974) is an American football coach and former player. He served as the head football coach at Southwest Minnesota State University from 2010 to 2021. Sauter played college football as a quarterback at the University of Minnesota and professionally in the National Football League (NFL) and NFL Europe.

== Playing career ==
Sauter played college football at the University of Minnesota from 1994 to 1997. Sauter finished his career as a four-time Academic All-Big Ten award winner and two-time GTE Academic All-America District V selection. He was a three-year letter winner and started the final 34 games of his collegiate career and played in the Blue-Gray All-Star Football Classic following his senior season. He still holds the all-time career school records with 539 pass completions, 945 pass attempts and 6,834 passing yards. His 40 career touchdown passes and .570 completion percentage also rank second all-time.

Sauter was signed as an undrafted free agent by the Arizona Cardinals in 1998. He spent the season on the practice squad. The 1999 and 2000 seasons were spent with the Detroit Lions as a back-up quarterback. He also spent the spring of 2000 with the Barcelona Dragons in NFL Europe. In 2001, he was with the Indianapolis Colts. He split the 2002 season with the Indianapolis Colts and with the Chicago Bears. He played one game for the Chicago Bears where he went 6-9 for 59 yards. He was back with the Colts for the 2003 season.

== Coaching career ==
=== Assistant coaching ===
Sauter began his coaching career as the quarterbacks coach for the Hamburg Sea Devils of NFL Europe in 2006. In the fall he served as a graduate assistant coach at his alma mater, the University of Minnesota. He returned to NFL Europe in 2007 where he was the quarterbacks coach for the Berlin Thunder.

=== Southwest Minnesota State ===
On July 7, 2008, it was announced that Sauter was hired as quarterbacks coach and passing game coordinator at Southwest Minnesota State University, an NCAA Division II football program in Marshall, Minnesota. His coaching responsibilities began on July 1. He was promoted to the position of offensive coordinator and quarterbacks coach in 2009. In February 2010, Sauter was promoted once again, to interim head coach of the Mustangs after former coach Eric Eidsness decided to leave the team to join Division I South Dakota State University as their quarterbacks coach and passing game coordinator of the Jackrabbits.

On March 29, 2010, the interim tag was removed from Sauter's title and he was officially named the Mustangs head football coach.

== Personal life ==
Sauter lives in Phoenix, AZ, with his wife Amy and their daughters Berlin and Estella. Sauter is a 1997 University of Minnesota graduate with a degree in kinesiology. He earned his Master's in sports management from the University of Minnesota in 2003.

== Head coaching record ==
Year	Team	Overall	Conference	Standing	Bowl/playoffs
Southwest Minnesota State Mustangs (Northern Sun Intercollegiate Conference) (2010–present)
2010	Southwest Minnesota State	4–7	3–7 / 1–5	10th / T–6th (South)	
2011	Southwest Minnesota State	3–8	3–7 / 1–5	11th / 6th (South)	
2012	Southwest Minnesota State	4–7	4–7 / 3–4	T–10th / T–4th (South)	
2013	Southwest Minnesota State	7–5	7–4 / 5–2	4th / 2nd (South)	L Mineral Water
2014	Southwest Minnesota State	3–8	3–8 / 2–5	T–13th / T–6th (South)	
2015	Southwest Minnesota State	8–3	8–3 / 4–3	T–4th / 4th (South)	
2016	Southwest Minnesota State	5–6	5–6 / 2–5	T–9th / T–5th (South)	
2017	Southwest Minnesota State	2–9	2–9 / 0–7	T–13th / 8th (South)	
2018	Southwest Minnesota State	4–7	4–7 / 1–6	T–10th / T–7th (South)	
2019	Southwest Minnesota State	3–8	3–8 / 1–6	T–12th / 7th (South)	
2020–21	No team—COVID-19				
2021	Southwest Minnesota State	2–9	2–9 / 1–5	T–11th / T–6th (South)	
Southwest Minnesota State:		45–77	44–75		
Total:		45–77			
