= Chris Darkins =

American football player (born 1974)

No. 44
- Position: Running back

Personal information
- Born: April 30, 1974 (age 52); San Francisco, California, U.S.
- Listed height: 6 ft 0 in (1.83 m)
- Listed weight: 205 lb (93 kg)

Career information
- High school: Strake Jesuit College Preparatory (Houston, Texas)
- College: Minnesota
- NFL draft: 1996: 4th round, 123rd overall pick

Career history
- Green Bay Packers (1996–1997)

Awards and highlights
- Super Bowl champion (XXXI); First-team All-Big Ten (1994)

Career NFL statistics
- Games played: 14
- Stats at Pro Football Reference

Christopher Oji Darkins (born April 30, 1974) is an American former professional football player who was a running back for the Green Bay Packers of the National Football League (NFL). He played college football for the Minnesota Golden Gophers.

== Biography ==
Darkins was born in San Francisco.

== Career ==
He attended high school at Strake Jesuit College Preparatory and played collegiately at the University of Minnesota. In 1994, he was awarded the Bronko Nagurski Award as the team's most valuable player. He also earned first-team All-Big Ten honors in 1994 by setting a school record with 1,443 rushing yards on the season. Darkins career rushing total of 3,235 yards was third on Minnesota's all-time list when his career ended and remains fifth-best in program history. His 294 rushing yards against Purdue in 1995 is still the highest single-game total in Gopher football history.

Following his collegiate career, Darkins was selected in the fourth round of the 1996 NFL draft by the Green Bay Packers.

Darkins was a member of the 1996 Super Bowl Championship team and the 1997 NFC Championship team that lost to Denver in the Super Bowl.

== Awards ==
In 2015, Darkins was inducted into the University of Minnesota hall of fame.
