= Rodney Heath (gridiron football) =

American gridiron football player (born 1974)

No. 22, 25
- Position: Cornerback

Personal information
- Born: October 29, 1974 (age 52); Cincinnati, Ohio, U.S.

Career information
- College: Minnesota
- NFL draft: 1997: undrafted

Career history
- Cincinnati Bengals (1999–2001); Atlanta Falcons (2002); Hamilton Tiger-Cats (2004)

Awards and highlights
- Second-team All-Big Ten (1995)

Career NFL statistics
- Tackles: 99
- Interceptions: 3
- Fumble recoveries: 4
- Stats at Pro Football Reference

Rodney Larece Heath (born October 29, 1974) is an American former professional football player who was a cornerback for four seasons with the Cincinnati Bengals and Atlanta Falcons of the National Football League (NFL). He played college football for the Minnesota Golden Gophers. He also played professionally for one season with the Hamilton Tiger-Cats of the Canadian Football League (CFL). Heath is currently the coach for Lakota East High School in Liberty Township, Ohio. He also coaches and trains some of Southwestern Ohio's top athletes in Track and Field. He can be seen on WLWT Sports Rock and WCPO Sports of All Sorts on Sunday nights.
