= Remy Hamilton =

American football player (born 1974)

No. 19
- Position: Placekicker

Personal information
- Born: August 30, 1974 (age 52); Wildwood, New Jersey, U.S.
- Listed height: 6 ft 0 in (1.83 m)
- Listed weight: 220 lb (100 kg)

Career information
- High school: Spanish River Community (Boca Raton, Florida)
- College: Michigan
- NFL draft: 1997: undrafted

Career history
- Grand Rapids Rampage (1998–1999); Carolina Cobras (2000); Milwaukee Mustangs (2001); Los Angeles Avengers (2002–2007); Seattle Seahawks (2003)*; Chicago Bears (2004)*; St. Louis Rams (2005, 2006)*; Detroit Lions (2005); Dallas Desperados (2008); Dallas Vigilantes (2011); Philadelphia Soul (2012)
- * Offseason or practice squad member only

Awards and highlights
- First-team All-American (1994); Big Ten Conference single-season field goals made record (25, 1994–present); AFL career scoring record (2008–present); AFL career field goals made record; AFL career extra points made record; AFL single-season field goal percentage record (74.4%, 2005–2006; 75.0%, 2006–present); AFL consecutive field goals record (12, 2005–present); AFL single-season kick scoring record (186, 2005–present); 2× AFL Kicker of the Year (2005, 2006); AFL kick scoring leader (2004, 2005 & 2006); 2× First-team All-Arena (2005, 2006); 2× Second-team All-Arena (2004, 2008); First-team All-Big Ten (1994); Michigan Wolverines consecutive field goals made record (14, 1996–present); Michigan Wolverines single season kick points record (101, 1994–present)

Career NFL statistics
- Field Goals made: 0
- Field Goals attempted: 0
- Extra Points made: 0
- Extra Points attempted: 1
- Stats at Pro Football Reference

Career AFL statistics
- Field Goals made: 188
- Field Goals attempted: 391
- Extra Points made: 1,091
- Extra Points attempted: 1,225
- Stats at ArenaFan.com

Remy Martin Hamilton (born August 30, 1974) is an American former professional football player who was a kicker in the National Football League (NFL) and Arena Football League (AFL). He played college football for the Michigan Wolverines, earning first-team All-American honors in 1994. As a professional, he played for the Detroit Lions of the NFL in addition to exhibition and training camp experience with the Seattle Seahawks, St. Louis Rams and Chicago Bears. He also played for the Grand Rapids Rampage, Carolina Cobras, Milwaukee Mustangs, Los Angeles Avengers, and Dallas Desperados of the AFL. In the AFL, he holds records for all-time career points and single-season kick points.

At Michigan, he set the Big Ten Conference record for single-season field goals, which was 25 (the record is now 29). He ranks both first and second in school history in single-season field goals made and co-holds the school record for consecutive field goals made along with Brendan Gibbons. He is the first All-American placekicker in Michigan history. Jake Moody and Dominic Zvada were also Michigan All-American placekickers.

== Early life ==
Hamilton attended Spanish River Community High School in Boca Raton, Florida, where he was a three-sport athlete in football, soccer, and tennis. In football, he played as a kicker, punter, defensive back, and quarterback.

As a senior starting quarterback, the Sun-Sentinel named him the Offensive Player of the Year, after completing 74 of 121 passes for 1,147 yards, 11 touchdowns, and rushing for 249 yards and six touchdowns.

Hamilton was named after the Rémy Martin brand of cognac, which his parents once served as owners of the New Jersey Bolero Motel and Bar.

== College career ==
Hamilton attended the University of Michigan, where he played football from 1993 to 1996. During this first season at Michigan, he only made one field goal. After making a 47-yard field goal in his only attempt as a freshman, he lost the kicking job to Erik Lovell in spring practice. Lovell handled the kicking duties in the 1994 NCAA Division I-A football season opener and Hamilton did not get the starting assignment until immediately before the second game. Lovell missed an extra point in the opener, which gave Hamilton his second chance. Thus, before the second game of his sophomore season, he had not recorded any field goals that season, still had a career total of one and was mostly used for kickoffs. However, during the September 10, 1994 Michigan – Notre Dame rivalry game against third-ranked Notre Dame, he made four field goals and two extra point conversions, including the game-winning 42-yarder with two seconds remaining. Notre Dame called a timeout to ice Hamilton, but it inadvertently helped Michigan, which had prematurely packed away the kicking net on its sidelines. The field goal redeemed Hamilton for a missed tackle on a kickoff return, which he felt would have cost his team the game. For his performance, the Big Ten named him the Special Teams Player of the Week. Michigan fans still remember Hamilton for this game, and regularly congratulate him for the kick. Two games later, he had a three-field goal game in the Big Ten Conference opener against Iowa. Hamilton had another four-field goal outing later in the season against Illinois. This earned him another Player of the Week recognition.

He was named to the 1994 College Football All-America and 1994 All-Big Ten teams. Hamilton was a first team All-American selection by the Walter Camp Football Foundation and second team selection by the Associated Press and the Football News. Despite NFL alumni that include Jay Feely, Hayden Epstein and Ali Haji-Sheikh, Hamilton remains the school's only All-American placekicker. During the 1994 football season, Hamilton established the current Big Ten single-season record for successful field goals at 25, which has since been tied three times,. The Big Ten was talented at the placekicker position that season, with four of the twenty semifinalists for the Lou Groza Award being from the conference (Hamilton, Illinois' Chris Richardson, Minnesota's Mike Chalberg and Northwestern's Sam Valenzisi). Hamilton won the NCAA statistical championship for field goal kickers that season. He also set Michigan's single season kick point record with 101 in 1994.

During the 1995 season, one of his more important field goals for the Wolverines came in the 5–0 victory over Purdue. However, when Northwestern beat Michigan at Michigan Stadium, 19–13, for its first victory there since 1959, Hamilton missed a key 37-yard field goal. His 1995 total of 19 field goals ranked second in Michigan history, behind only his own 1994 total. Garrett Rivas tied that single-season total twice, but no one has unseated Hamilton from first and second place.

He also helped the 1996 team take a 9–0 halftime lead and converted an extra point to give them a 16–0 lead in what would eventually be a loss to Northwestern, 17–16. His fourth-quarter points contributed to a 27–20 victory over Indiana. He earned his third Big Ten Special Teams Player of the Week honors following a 13–9 victory over Ohio State in the Michigan – Ohio State football rivalry game on November 23, 1996. He put the team ahead, 10–9, on the last play of the third quarter and added a key field goal with 1:19 remaining. A two-time finalist for the Lou Groza Award, Hamilton finished his career as the all-time Wolverine leader in field goals made (63) and field goals attempted (82). Before his career ended, he became the ninth Wolverine to accumulate over 200 points.

Hamilton holds the Michigan record for consecutive field goals made (14) as well as outright or shared school records for single-game (5), single-season (30) and career (82) field goal attempts. His career field goals made record (63) was eclipsed by Garrett Rivas in 2006 by one. Hamilton was a three-time Big Ten All-Academic selection (1993, 1995, 1996). He was also a three-time Big Ten Conference Special Teams Player of the Week (9/12/94, 10/10/94, 11/25/96). His 14 consecutive field goals mark was one short of Vlade Janakievski's Big Ten record, which has since been broken. Hamilton's 63 career field goals were two short of Todd Gregoire's Big Ten record, which has since been broken.

== Professional career ==
Hamilton joined the AFL's Grand Rapids Rampage in 1998, for which he played two seasons. In two seasons, he had modest success as a field goal kicker connecting on 31 of 88 attempts (35.2%). In his first season, he also caught a touchdown pass.

He then played in 2000 with the Carolina Cobras and in 2001 with the Milwaukee Mustangs, where he posted 11 of 42 (26.2%) and 18 of 47 (38.3%) field goal performances. While with the Cobras, Hamilton played against the Los Angeles Avengers in the first AFL game played at the Staples Center on April 20, 2000.

In 2002, he joined the Avengers for which he had his best years as a professional, making at least half of his field goal attempts each season. Hamilton was second among kickers in the AFL in scoring in 2003. Following his strong performance, he signed with the NFL's Seattle Seahawks on August 4, where he competed against rookie Josh Brown. After Brown was perfect in both four field goal and seven extra point attempts in the first three preseason games, Hamilton was released on August 25, and he returned to play for Los Angeles again.

Hamilton was the top-scoring kicker in the AFL in 2004. On August 9, 2004, he signed with the Chicago Bears, where he battled Paul Edinger for the kicking duties. Bears head coach Lovie Smith noted Hamilton's skill at onside kicks. In terms of distance, Hamilton had a slight edge with his average kick three yards deep in the end zone compared with Edinger's goal line average. However, Edinger was perfect on six field goals and two extra points in the first three preseason games, and Hamilton missed his only exhibition game field goal attempt, a 36-yarder on August 27. The team waived him a few days later on August 31.

He was again the top-scoring kicker in the AFL in 2005. That year, he eclipsed Jay Taylor's AFL record for single-season field goal percentage, which had been 72%, with a 74.4% 29 for 39 performance. Hamilton started the season with eleven consecutive field goals, giving him a total of twelve in a row for a league record. He earned a couple of NFL tryouts. Hamilton first signed with the St. Louis Rams on July 27, 2005. He played for them during the 2005 exhibition season. He made the team's final points with a field goal in an August 12, 17–13 preseason victory over the Chicago Bears. For the preseason, he made his only field goal and all six extra points. He was released on August 30, as the Rams decided to retain Jeff Wilkins who had been their kicker since 1997. Hamilton then signed with the Detroit Lions for their practice squad on September 15, 2005. He appeared in one NFL game for Detroit, but missed his only point after touchdown attempt, which was blocked by Alfonso Boone. He also executed a couple of kickoffs, and he made the tackle on Jerry Azumah's 33-yard return to the 37-yard line on one in the third quarter. He was activated to replace Jason Hanson who suffered a hamstring injury, which ended Hanson's consecutive games streak at 209. However, Hamilton was released on September 19 and re-signed the next day to the practice squad. He was cut from the Lions practice squad on October 11.

Hamilton returned to the AFL for Los Angeles, and he led the AFL's kickers in scoring again in 2006. This earned Hamilton his second consecutive AFL's "Kicker of the Year" title and second consecutive First Team All-Arena League selection. His 2006-point total is 2nd in AFL history to his own 2005 total. On June 7, 2006, he signed with the Rams to compete in training camp, and he played for them in exhibition games during 2006. He made four of six field goals (including a 48-yarder) and four of five extra points during the preseason. On August 28, he was released, after the Rams kept Wilkins again. Hamilton returned to the AFL for his final season in Los Angeles.

He ranked third in kicker scoring in the AFL for Los Angeles in 2007. He joined the Dallas Desperados for 2008. He spent the 2011 season with the Dallas Vigilantes. In 2012, Hamilton was assigned to the Philadelphia Soul. By the time of his assignment he was the AFL's all-time leader in field goals made (188), extra points made (1,082) and scoring by a kicker (1,646 points).

== Personal life ==
In a May 2009 article, the Los Angeles Times reported that, less than 15 hours after a 53–52 overtime loss to the Georgia Force at Staples Center, Hamilton's wife, Heather, delivered the couple's first child, a boy named Tate. Hamilton has served as a personal trainer for other kickers.

Hamilton and his wife, Heather, also went on to have a baby girl Elle Jessie Hamilton. Soon after Elle they had another baby boy, Hawk Campbell Hamilton.
