= Blaikley =

Blaikley is a surname. Notable people with the surname include:

- Alan Blaikley (1940–2022), English songwriter and composer
- Catherine Kaidyee Blaikley (c. 1695–1771), American landowner and midwife

== See also ==
- Blackley (surname)
- Blakeley (surname)
