= Blackney =

Blackney is a surname. Notable people with the surname include:

- Gary Blackney (born 1944), American football player and coach
- Ron Blackney (1933–2008), Australian middle-distance runner
- William W. Blackney (1876–1963), American politician

== See also ==
- Blackley (surname)
- Blakney
