= 1996 Akron Zips football team =

American college football season

1996 Akron Zips football
- Conference: Mid-American Conference
- Record: 4–7 (3–5 MAC)
- Head coach: Lee Owens (2nd season)
- Offensive coordinator: Paul Winters (2nd season)
- Defensive coordinator: David Snowball (2nd season)
- Home stadium: Rubber Bowl

1996 Mid-American Conference football standings
	Conf.			Overall
Team	W		L	W		L
Ball State $	7	–	1	8	–	4
Toledo	6	–	2	7	–	4
Miami (OH)	6	–	2	6	–	5
Ohio	5	–	3	6	–	6
Central Michigan	4	–	4	5	–	6
Akron	3	–	5	4	–	7
Bowling Green	3	–	5	4	–	7
Eastern Michigan	3	–	5	3	–	8
Western Michigan	2	–	6	2	–	9
Kent State	1	–	7	2	–	9
$ – Conference champion

The 1996 Akron Zips football team represented Akron University in the 1996 NCAA Division I-A football season as members of the Mid-American Conference. They were led by second–year head coach Lee Owens. The Zips played their home games at the Rubber Bowl in Akron, Ohio. They finished the season with a record of 4–7, 3–5 in MAC play to finish in a three-way tie for sixth place.

== Schedule ==
Date	Opponent	Site	Result	Attendance	Source
August 29	at Ohio	Peden Stadium; Athens, OH	L 14–44		
September 7	No. 15 Virginia Tech*	Rubber Bowl; Akron, OH	L 18–21	12,293	
September 14	Toledo	Rubber Bowl; Akron, OH	L 10–27		
September 21	at Illinois*	Memorial Stadium; Champaign, IL	L 7–38	48,285	
September 28	Western Michigan	Rubber Bowl; Akron, OH	W 27–7		
October 5	at Kent State	Dix Stadium; Kent, OH (Wagon Wheel)	L 17–32		
October 12	at Central Michigan	Kelly/Shorts Stadium; Mount Pleasant, MI	L 0–42		
October 19	Miami (OH)	Rubber Bowl; Akron, OH	W 10–7		
October 26	at Northern Illinois*	Huskie Stadium; DeKalb, IL	W 34–17	10,465	
November 2	Bowling Green	Rubber Bowl; Akron, OH	W 21–14		
November 9	at Eastern Michigan	Rynearson Stadium; Ypsilanti, MI	L 17–20		
*Non-conference game; Rankings from AP Poll released prior to the game
