= 1996 Ball State Cardinals football team =

American college football season

1996 Ball State Cardinals football

MAC champion

Las Vegas Bowl, L 15–18 vs. Nevada
- Conference: Mid-American Conference
- Record: 8–4 (7–1 MAC)
- Head coach: Bill Lynch (2nd season)
- Home stadium: Ball State Stadium

1996 Mid-American Conference football standings
	Conf.			Overall
Team	W		L	W		L
Ball State $	7	–	1	8	–	4
Toledo	6	–	2	7	–	4
Miami (OH)	6	–	2	6	–	5
Ohio	5	–	3	6	–	6
Central Michigan	4	–	4	5	–	6
Akron	3	–	5	4	–	7
Bowling Green	3	–	5	4	–	7
Eastern Michigan	3	–	5	3	–	8
Western Michigan	2	–	6	2	–	9
Kent State	1	–	7	2	–	9
$ – Conference champion

The 1996 Ball State Cardinals football team was an American football team that represented Ball State University in the Mid-American Conference (MAC) during the 1996 NCAA Division I-A football season. In its second season under head coach Bill Lynch, the team compiled an 8–4 record (7–1 against conference opponents), won the MAC championship, and lost to Nevada in the 1996 Las Vegas Bowl. The team played its home games at Ball State Stadium in Muncie, Indiana.

The team's statistical leaders included Brent Baldwin with 1,703 passing yards, Michael Blair with 680 rushing yards, Ed Abernathy with 425 receiving yards, and Brent Lockliear with 56 points scored.

== Schedule ==
Date	Opponent	Site	Result	Attendance	Source
August 29	at No. 25 Kansas*	Memorial Stadium; Lawrence, KS	L 10–35	36,200	
September 7	Miami (OH)	Ball State Stadium; Muncie, IN	L 6–16		
September 14	at Minnesota*	Hubert H. Humphrey Metrodome; Minneapolis, N	L 23–26	41,007	
September 21	UCF*	Ball State Stadium; Muncie, IN	W 31–10	11,475	
October 5	at Western Michigan	Waldo Stadium; Kalamazoo, MI	W 28–5		
October 12	Ohio	Ball State Stadium; Muncie, IN	W 30–27		
October 19	at Bowling Green	Doyt Perry Stadium; Bowling Green, OH	W 16–11		
October 26	at Central Michigan	Kelly/Shorts Stadium; Mount Pleasant, MI	W 24–17		
November 2	at Eastern Michigan	Rynearson Stadium; Ypsilanti, MI	W 39–25		
November 9	Kent State	Ball State Stadium; Muncie, IN	W 50–6		
November 16	Toledo	Ball State Stadium; Muncie, IN	W 24–14		
December 19	vs. Nevada*	Sam Boyd Stadium; Whitney, NV (Las Vegas Bowl)	L 15–18	10,118	
*Non-conference game; Rankings from AP Poll released prior to the game
