= 1996 Toledo Rockets football team =

American college football season

1996 Toledo Rockets football
- Conference: Mid-American Conference
- Record: 7–4 (6–2 MAC)
- Head coach: Gary Pinkel (6th season)
- Offensive coordinator: Mike Dunbar (5th season)
- Offensive scheme: Pro-style
- Defensive coordinator: Tom Amstutz (3rd season)
- Base defense: 4–4
- Home stadium: Glass Bowl

1996 Mid-American Conference football standings
	Conf.			Overall
Team	W		L	W		L
Ball State $	7	–	1	8	–	4
Toledo	6	–	2	7	–	4
Miami (OH)	6	–	2	6	–	5
Ohio	5	–	3	6	–	6
Central Michigan	4	–	4	5	–	6
Akron	3	–	5	4	–	7
Bowling Green	3	–	5	4	–	7
Eastern Michigan	3	–	5	3	–	8
Western Michigan	2	–	6	2	–	9
Kent State	1	–	7	2	–	9
$ – Conference champion

The 1996 Toledo Rockets football team was an American football team that represented the University of Toledo in the Mid-American Conference (MAC) during the 1996 NCAA Division I-A football season. In their sixth season under head coach Gary Pinkel, the Rockets compiled a 7–4 record (6–2 against MAC opponents), finished in a tie for second place in the MAC, and were outscored by all opponents by a combined total of 259 to 210.

The team's statistical leaders included Ryan Huzjak with 2,058 passing yards, Kevin Kidd with 453 rushing yards, and James Spriggs with 754 receiving yards.

== Schedule ==
Date	Opponent	Site	Result	Attendance	Source
September 7	Indiana*	Glass Bowl; Toledo, OH	L 6–40	25,540	
September 14	at Akron	Rubber Bowl; Akron, OH	W 27–10		
September 21	at Eastern Michigan	Rynearson Stadium; Ypsilanti, MI	W 24–7		
September 28	No. 14 (I-AA) Weber State*	Glass Bowl; Toledo, OH	W 31–24	23,927	
October 5	Bowling Green	Glass Bowl; Toledo, OH (rivalry)	W 24–16		
October 19	at Louisiana Tech*	Joe Aillet Stadium; Ruston, LA	L 20–61	17,052	
October 26	Western Michigan	Glass Bowl; Toledo, OH	W 10–7 ^{OT}		
November 2	Miami (OH)	Glass Bowl; Toledo, OH	L 7–27		
November 9	Central Michigan	Glass Bowl; Toledo, OH	W 23–20		
November 16	at Ball State	Scheumann Stadium; Muncie, IN	L 14–24		
November 24	at Ohio	Peden Stadium; Athens, OH	W 24–23		
*Non-conference game; Rankings from Coaches' Poll released prior to the game

== Roster ==
1996 Toledo Rockets football team roster
Players
Coaches
Offense

Pos.	#	Name	Class
G	60	Paul Dalmas	Sr
WR	4	Chris Hall	Jr
QB	10	Ryan Huzjak	Sr
OL	63	Jovan Ilich	Fr
TE	89	Isaiah Jackson	So
WR	9	Nate Jackson	Fr
FL	84	Brock Kreitzburg	So
C	71	Mike Lenix	Jr
OL	61	Jeff Ling	Fr
WR	25	David Livingston	So
OT	74	Chris Williams	Jr
TB	21	J.D. Williams	So
HB	8	Vince Wilson	Sr
FB	1	Justin Wooley	So

Defense

Pos.	#	Name	Class
LB	35	Marlon Brisker	Sr
DT	58	John Brown	So
CB	15	Todd Burch	Fr
DE	57	Loren Burkey	Jr
CB	11	Kelly Herndon	So
CB	4	Chris Holifield	Jr
DL	98	Rudy Lomberger	Fr
CB	26	Clarence Love	Jr
CB	22	Philip Martin	Fr
LB	30	Marcus Matthews	Jr
DL	99	Adam Mitoraj	Fr
LB	54	Matt Vaillant	So
DT	90	Damon Walker	Sr

Special teams

Pos.	#	Name	Class
K	3	Ryan Klaer	So

Head coach

- Gary Pinkel

Coordinators/assistant coaches

Legend

- (C) Team captain
- (S) Suspended
- (I) Ineligible
- Injured
- Redshirt

Roster
