= 1996 Miami Redskins football team =

American college football season

1996 Miami Redhawks football
- Conference: Mid-American Conference
- Record: 6–5 (6–2 MAC)
- Head coach: Randy Walker (7th season)
- Offensive coordinator: Kevin Wilson (5th season)
- Offensive scheme: I formation
- Defensive coordinator: Terry Hoeppner (2nd season)
- Base defense: 4–3
- Home stadium: Yager Stadium

1996 Mid-American Conference football standings
	Conf.			Overall
Team	W		L	W		L
Ball State $	7	–	1	8	–	4
Toledo	6	–	2	7	–	4
Miami (OH)	6	–	2	6	–	5
Ohio	5	–	3	6	–	6
Central Michigan	4	–	4	5	–	6
Akron	3	–	5	4	–	7
Bowling Green	3	–	5	4	–	7
Eastern Michigan	3	–	5	3	–	8
Western Michigan	2	–	6	2	–	9
Kent State	1	–	7	2	–	9
$ – Conference champion

The 1996 Miami Redskins football team was an American football team that represented Miami University in the Mid-American Conference (MAC) during the 1996 NCAA Division I-A football season in its last year under the name “Redskins”. In its seventh season under head coach Randy Walker, Miami compiled a 6–5 record (6–2 against MAC opponents), finished in a tie for second place in the MAC, and outscored all opponents by a combined total of 273 to 168.

The team's statistical leaders included Sam Ricketts with 1,333 passing yards, Ty King with 1,065 rushing yards, and Tremayne Banks with 617 receiving yards.

== Schedule ==
Date	Opponent	Site	Result	Attendance
August 31	Kent State	Yager Stadium; Oxford, OH	W 64–6	
September 7	at Ball State	Ball State Stadium; Muncie, IN	W 16–6	
September 14	at Indiana*	Memorial Stadium; Bloomington, IN	L 14–21	
September 21	Bowling Green	Yager Stadium; Oxford, OH	L 10–14	
September 28	at Cincinnati*	Nippert Stadium; Cincinnati, OH (rivalry)	L 23–30	
October 5	Central Michigan	Yager Stadium; Oxford, OH	W 46–14	
October 12	at Eastern Michigan	Rynearson Stadium; Ypsilanti, MI	W 35–25	
October 19	at Akron	Rubber Bowl; Akron, OH	L 7–10	
October 26	Army*	Yager Stadium; Oxford, OH	L 7–27	16,543
November 2	at Toledo	Glass Bowl; Toledo, OH	W 27–7	
November 9	Ohio	Yager Stadium; Oxford, OH (rivalry)	W 24–8	
*Non-conference game

== Roster ==
1996 Miami Redskins football team roster
Players
Coaches
Offense 28 Tremayne Banks WR 5-10 185 Sr. 1 Ray Barnes WR 5-9 165 So. San Diego, Calif. 6 Mike Bath QB 6-1 210 Fr. Celina, Ohio 91 Bob Beinecke TE 6-4 245 Fr. Youngstown, Ohio +18 Andy Beredo QB 6-0 180 Fr. North Olmstead, Ohio 78 Eric Beverly OT 6-4 275 Sr. Bedford Hts., Ohio 92 Brett Bilins TE 6-4 235 Fr. Dublin, Ohio 72 Mike Bird OG 6-2 301 Jr 61 Matt Cravens C 6-4 285 Sr 53 Chris Kalafatis OL 6-4 280 Fr. Shaker Hts., Ohio 70 Josh Kickish OL 6-4 290 Fr. Irwin, Pa. 27 Ty King TB 6-0 200 Sr. Columbus, Ohio 84 Kasey Klaas WR 5-11 180 Fr. Wheaton, Ill. 60 Matt Kordos C 6-3 285 Jr 12 Wince Morris QB 5-10 170 Sr 41 Travis Prentice RB 6-1 220 So 29 Garrett Purdy WR 5-8 170 Jr. Lakewood, Ohio 54 Chris Rhodes OL 6-2 265 Sr. Campbell, Ohio 74 Josh Romberg OG 6-4 290 So 71 Mark Sroka OT 6-5 295 Jr. Norwood Park, IL +59 Mike Staubach OG 6-2 250 Fr. Harrison, OH 67 Ted Stec OG 6-3 285 So. LaGrange, IL 88 Alex Sulfsted TE 6-5 255 Fr. Loveland, OH 86 Mike Sullivan TE 6-5 225 Fr 13 Scott Trostel WR 5-10 182 Sr. Oxford, OH 83 Damian Vaughn TE 6-4 250 Jr. Orrville, OH 73 Brian Vest OT 6-5 290 Jr

Pos.	#	Name	Class
OT	78	Eric Beverly	Sr
QB	16	Sam Ricketts	Sr

Defense 34 Ryan Abel MLB 6-2 225 So 75 Mike Antonelli DL 6-2 250 Fr. Gaithersburg, Md. 98 Andy Aracri DE 6-1 230 Fr. Kettering, Ohio 35 JoJuan Armour OLB 6-1 220 So. Toledo, Ohio 17 John Baker CB 5-11 190 So 46 Dustin Cohen OLB 6-4 220 Fr 26 Jason Druso SS 6-0 200 Jr 56 Kenyon Harper MLB 6-3 235 Sr. Detroit, Mich. 93 Jason Havens DT 6-4 261 Jr. Hamilton, Ill. 90 Jason Holmes DE 6-3 260 Sr 58 Brad Krupinski DE 6-2 230 Fr 51 Mike Montgomery LB 6-3 220 Fr. Findlay, Ohio 97 Patrice Morgan DT 6-3 265 Jr 48 Dee Osborne OLB 6-2 230 Sr. Olympia Fields, Ill. 43 Joe Palcic OLB 5-11 215 Jr

Pos.	#	Name	Class

Special teams 63 Matt Barnes LS 6-2 240 So 10 Jason Cheney P 6-2 194 Sr

Pos.	#	Name	Class

Head coach

- Randy Walker

Coordinators/assistant coaches

Legend

- (C) Team captain
- (S) Suspended
- (I) Ineligible
- Injured
- Redshirt

Roster
