= 1996 Western Michigan Broncos football team =

American college football season

1996 Western Michigan Broncos football
- Conference: Mid-American Conference
- Record: 2–9 (2–6 MAC)
- Head coach: Al Molde (10th season)
- Offensive coordinator: Rob Kuhlman
- Defensive coordinator: Larry Edlund
- MVP: Tony Knox
- Home stadium: Waldo Stadium

1996 Mid-American Conference football standings
| | Conf. | | | Overall |
| Team | W | | L | W | | L |
|---|---|---|---|---|---|---|
| Ball State $ | 7 | – | 1 | 8 | – | 4 |
| Toledo | 6 | – | 2 | 7 | – | 4 |
| Miami (OH) | 6 | – | 2 | 6 | – | 5 |
| Ohio | 5 | – | 3 | 6 | – | 6 |
| Central Michigan | 4 | – | 4 | 5 | – | 6 |
| Akron | 3 | – | 5 | 4 | – | 7 |
| Bowling Green | 3 | – | 5 | 4 | – | 7 |
| Eastern Michigan | 3 | – | 5 | 3 | – | 8 |
| Western Michigan | 2 | – | 6 | 2 | – | 9 |
| Kent State | 1 | – | 7 | 2 | – | 9 |
$ – Conference champion

The 1996 Western Michigan Broncos football team represented Western Michigan University in the Mid-American Conference (MAC) during the 1996 NCAA Division I-A football season. In their tenth and final season under head coach Al Molde, the Broncos compiled a 2–9 record (2–6 against MAC opponents), finished in ninth place in the MAC, and were outscored by their opponents, 304 to 208. The team played its home games at Waldo Stadium in Kalamazoo, Michigan.

The team's statistical leaders included freshman quarterback Tim Lester with 2,189 passing yards, Bruno Heppell with 700 rushing yards, and Tony Knox with 754 receiving yards. Lester was named the MAC freshman of the year.

Molde was fired as the school's head football coach on November 20, 1996. In 10 years as head coach, he compiled a 62-47-2 record. The firing followed a public dispute with athletic director Jim Weaver over Molde's contract.

== Schedule ==
| Date | Opponent | Site | Result | Attendance | Source |
|---|---|---|---|---|---|
| August 29 | No. 25 Eastern Illinois* | Waldo Stadium; Kalamazoo, MI | L 20–28 | | |
| September 7 | at West Virginia* | Mountaineer Field; Morgantown, WV | L 9–34 | 47,938 | |
| September 14 | Eastern Michigan | Waldo Stadium; Kalamazoo, MI | L 12–19 | | |
| September 21 | at Central Michigan | Kelly/Shorts Stadium; Mount Pleasant, MI (rivalry) | L 28–38 | | |
| September 28 | at Akron | Rubber Bowl; Akron, OH | L 7–27 | | |
| October 5 | Ball State | Waldo Stadium; Kalamazoo, MI | L 5–28 | | |
| October 12 | at Wyoming* | War Memorial Stadium; Laramie, WY | L 28–42 | 22,813 | |
| October 26 | at Toledo | Glass Bowl; Toledo, OH | L 7–10 ^{OT} | | |
| November 2 | Ohio | Waldo Stadium; Kalamazoo, MI | L 0–38 | | |
| November 9 | at Bowling Green | Doyt Perry Stadium; Bowling Green, OH | W 16–13 ^{OT} | | |
| November 16 | Kent State | Waldo Stadium; Kalamazoo, MI | W 76–27 | | |
*Non-conference game; Rankings from The Sports Network Poll released prior to the game
