= Dick Flynn (American football) =

American football player and coach (born 1943)

Biographical details
- Born: July 17, 1943 (age 83); Mount Pleasant, Michigan, U.S.

Playing career
- 1962–1964: Michigan State
- Positions: End, tackle

Coaching career (HC unless noted)
- 1965–1966: Eastern HS (MI) (AHC)
- 1971–1977: Eastern HS (MI)
- 1978–1990: Central Michigan (DC)
- 1991–1993: Central Michigan (AHC/DC)
- 1994–1999: Central Michigan
- 2000: Indiana (LB)
- 2001: Indiana (DE)
- 2002–2003: Akron (LB)
- 2004–2005: Eastern Michigan (DE)

Head coaching record
- Overall: 30–37 (college)
- Bowls: 0–1

Accomplishments and honors

Championships
- 1 MAC (1994)

Awards
- MAC Coach of the Year (1994)

Richard O. Flynn (born July 17, 1943) is an American former football player and coach. He served as the head football coach at Central Michigan University from 1994 to 1999, compiling a record of 30–37.

== Career ==
Flynn played football at Michigan State from 1962 to 1964. At the end of his senior year he won the Ross Trophy, given annually to the best scholar-athlete. Following his graduation from Michigan State he served as an assistant coach at Lansing Eastern High School from 1965 to 1966 before serving four years in the United States Air Force as a lieutenant. He returned to Eastern High School in 1971 as head football coach, a position he would occupy until 1977.

Central Michigan promoted Herb Deromedi, its defensive coordinator, to become head football coach in 1978 on the unexpected departure of Roy Kramer. Deromedi brought in Flynn as one of several defensive assistants, with responsibility for linebackers. Also on staff was future Notre Dame head coach Tyrone Willingham (secondary). Flynn was de facto coordinator during the 1978 season, and was formally given the title in 1979.

Flynn succeeded Deromedi as head coach after the 1993 season when the latter became athletic director. Flynn had been assistant head coach, in addition to defensive coordinator, from 1992 to 1993. After his resignation as Central Michigan's head coach toward the end of the 1999 season, Flynn served as an assistant coach at Indiana (2000–2001), Akron (2002–2003), and Eastern Michigan (2004–2005).

== Head coaching record ==
=== College ===
Year	Team	Overall	Conference	Standing	Bowl/playoffs
Central Michigan Chippewas (Mid-American Conference) (1994–1999)
1994	Central Michigan	9–3	8–1	1st	L Las Vegas
1995	Central Michigan	4–7	2–6	T–7th	
1996	Central Michigan	5–6	4–4	5th	
1997	Central Michigan	2–9	1–7	5th (West)	
1998	Central Michigan	6–5	5–3	T–2nd (West)	
1999	Central Michigan	4–7	3–5	5th (West)	
Central Michigan:		30–37	23–26		
Total:		30–37			
National championship Conference title Conference division title or championship game berth
