= 1996 Ohio Bobcats football team =

American college football season

1996 Ohio Bobcats football
- Conference: Mid-American Conference
- Record: 6–6 (5–3 MAC)
- Head coach: Jim Grobe (2nd season)
- Offensive coordinator: Mike Sewak (2nd season)
- Defensive coordinator: Tim DeRuyter (2nd season)
- Home stadium: Peden Stadium

1996 Mid-American Conference football standings
	Conf.			Overall
Team	W		L	W		L
Ball State $	7	–	1	8	–	4
Toledo	6	–	2	7	–	4
Miami (OH)	6	–	2	6	–	5
Ohio	5	–	3	6	–	6
Central Michigan	4	–	4	5	–	6
Akron	3	–	5	4	–	7
Bowling Green	3	–	5	4	–	7
Eastern Michigan	3	–	5	3	–	8
Western Michigan	2	–	6	2	–	9
Kent State	1	–	7	2	–	9
$ – Conference champion

The 1996 Ohio Bobcats football team was an American football team that represented Ohio University in the Mid-American Conference (MAC) during the 1996 NCAA Division I-A football season. In their second season under head coach Jim Grobe, the Bobcats compiled a 6–6 record (5–3 against MAC opponents), finished in fourth place in the MAC, and outscored all opponents by a combined total of 302 to 237. They played their home games in Peden Stadium in Athens, Ohio.

== Schedule ==
Date	Opponent	Site	Result	Attendance	Source
August 29	Akron	Peden Stadium; Athens, OH	W 44–14		
September 7	at Hawaii*	Aloha Stadium; Halawa, HI	W 21–10	32,069	
September 14	at Army*	Michie Stadium; West Point, NY	L 20–37	30,500	
September 21	at Northwestern*	Dyche Stadium; Evanston, IL	L 7–28	38,148	
October 5	Eastern Michigan	Peden Stadium; Athens, OH	W 7–0		
October 12	at Ball State	Ball State Stadium; Muncie, IN	L 27–30		
October 19	at Kent State	Dix Stadium; Kent, OH	W 24–15		
October 26	Bowling Green	Peden Stadium; Athens, OH	W 38–0		
November 2	at Western Michigan	Waldo Stadium; Kalamazoo, MI	W 38–0		
November 9	at Miami (OH)	Yager Stadium; Oxford, OH (rivalry)	L 8–24		
November 16	at East Carolina*	Dowdy–Ficklen Stadium; Greenville, NC	L 45–55	27,321	
November 23	Toledo	Peden Stadium; Athens, OH	L 23–24		
*Non-conference game
