= 1996 Iowa Hawkeyes football team =

American college football season

1996 Iowa Hawkeyes football

Alamo Bowl champion

Alamo Bowl, W 27–0 vs. Texas Tech
- Conference: Big Ten Conference

Ranking
- Coaches: No. 18
- AP: No. 18
- Record: 9–3 (6–2 Big Ten)
- Head coach: Hayden Fry (18th season)
- Offensive coordinator: Don Patterson (5th season)
- Offensive scheme: Pro-style
- Defensive coordinator: Bob Elliott (1st season)
- Base defense: 3–4
- MVPs: Tim Dwight; Damien Robinson; Sedrick Shaw; Ross Verba
- Captains: Bill Ennis-Inge; Tom Knight; Sedrick Shaw; Ross Verba
- Home stadium: Kinnick Stadium

1996 Big Ten Conference football standings
	Conf.			Overall
Team	W		L	W		L
No. 2 Ohio State +	7	–	1	11	–	1
No. 15 Northwestern +	7	–	1	9	–	3
No. 7 Penn State	6	–	2	11	–	2
No. 18 Iowa	6	–	2	9	–	3
No. 20 Michigan	5	–	3	8	–	4
Michigan State	5	–	3	6	–	6
Wisconsin	3	–	5	8	–	5
Purdue	2	–	6	3	–	8
Minnesota	1	–	7	4	–	7
Indiana	1	–	7	3	–	8
Illinois	1	–	7	2	–	9
+ – Conference co-champions; Rankings from AP Poll

The 1996 Iowa Hawkeyes football team represented the University of Iowa as a member of the Big Ten Conference during the 1996 NCAA Division I-A football season. Led by 18th-year head coach Hayden Fry, the Hawkeyes compiled an overall record of 9–3 with a mark of 6–2 in conference play, tying for third place in the Big Ten. Iowa was invited to the Alamo Bowl, where the Hawkeyes defeated Texas Tech. The team played home games at Kinnick Stadium in Iowa City, Iowa.

== Schedule ==
Date	Time	Opponent	Rank	Site	TV	Result	Attendance
September 7	11:30 am	Arizona*	No. 22	Kinnick Stadium; Iowa City, IA	ESPN	W 21–20	68,267
September 14	2:30 pm	Iowa State*	No. 21	Kinnick Stadium; Iowa City, IA (rivalry)	ABC	W 38–13	70,397
September 21	6:00 pm	at Tulsa*	No. 19	Skelly Stadium; Tulsa, OK	ESPN Plus	L 20–27	27,788
October 5	11:00 am	Michigan State		Kinnick Stadium; Iowa City, IA	ESPN Plus	W 37–30	70,397
October 12	1:00 pm	at Indiana		Memorial Stadium; Bloomington, IN		W 31–10	37,154
October 19	11:30 am	at No. 10 Penn State		Beaver Stadium; University Park, PA	ESPN2	W 21–20	96,230
October 26	2:30 pm	No. 2 Ohio State	No. 20	Kinnick Stadium; Iowa City, IA (College GameDay)	ABC	L 26–38	70,397
November 2	11:00 am	at Illinois	No. 25	Memorial Stadium; Champaign, IL	ESPN Plus	W 31–21	54,381
November 9	2:30 pm	No. 18 Northwestern	No. 23	Kinnick Stadium; Iowa City, IA	ABC	L 13–40	70,397
November 16	11:30 am	Wisconsin		Kinnick Stadium; Iowa City, IA (rivalry)	ESPN	W 31–0	66,570
November 23	7:30 pm	at Minnesota	No. 24	Hubert H. Humphrey Metrodome; Minneapolis, MN (rivalry)	ESPN2	W 43–24	53,349
December 29	7:00 pm	vs. Texas Tech*	No. 21	Alamodome; San Antonio, TX (Alamo Bowl)	ESPN	W 27–0	55,677
*Non-conference game; Rankings from AP Poll released prior to the game; All times are in Central time; Source:

== Rankings ==
Ranking movements Legend: ██ Increase in ranking ██ Decrease in ranking RV = Received votes
	Week																	
Poll	Pre	1	2	3	4	5	6	7	8	9	10	11	12	13	14	15	16	Final
AP	22	22	22	21	19	RV	RV	RV	RV	20	25	23	RV	24	22	21	21	18
Coaches	25		RV	21	19	25				19		25		23	22	21	21	18

== Game summaries ==
=== Arizona ===
Arizona at #22 Iowa

Team	1	2	3	4	Total
Wildcats	7	0	10	3	20
• Hawkeyes	0	14	7	0	21

- Date: September 7
- Location: Kinnick Stadium, Iowa City, IA
- Game attendance: 68,267
- Sources: Box score and Game recap

Scoring summary
Q1	0:43	ARIZ	Mike Lucky 1-yard pass from Keith Smith (Matt Peyton kick)	ARIZ 7–0
Q2	6:58	IOWA	Vernon Rollins fumble recovery in end zone (Zach Bromert kick)	Tied 7–7
Q2	6:35	IOWA	Damon Gibson 18-yard pass from Matt Sherman (Zach Bromert kick)	IOWA 14–7
Q3	12:01	IOWA	Sedrick Shaw 1-yard run (Zach Bromert kick)	IOWA 21–7
Q3	7:49	ARIZ	Matt Peyton 50-yard field goal	IOWA 21–10
Q3	5:56	ARIZ	Keith Smith 20-yard run (Matt Peyton kick)	IOWA 21–17
Q4	14:57	ARIZ	Matt Peyton 39-yard field goal	IOWA 21–20

Iowa held on to win this back-and-forth contest, aided by three Wildcat turnovers.

=== Iowa State ===
Iowa State at #21 Iowa
Battle for the Cy-Hawk Trophy

Team	1	2	3	4	Total
Cyclones	0	0	13	0	13
• Hawkeyes	7	17	14	0	38

- Date: September 14
- Location: Kinnick Stadium, Iowa City, IA
- Game attendance: 70,397
- Sources: Box score and Game recap

Scoring summary
Q1	0:00	IOWA	Tavian Banks 89-yard run (Zach Bromert kick)	IOWA 7–0
Q2	12:17	IOWA	Tavian Banks 13-yard run (Zach Bromert kick)	IOWA 14–0
Q2	6:59	IOWA	Damon Gibson 42-yard pass from Matt Sherman (Zach Bromert kick)	IOWA 21–0
Q2	0:03	IOWA	Brion Hurley 54-yard field goal	IOWA 24–0
Q3	13:21	ISU	Troy Davis 1-yard run (Jamie Kohl kick)	IOWA 24–7
Q3	11:49	IOWA	Tim Dwight 5-yard run (Zach Bromert kick)	IOWA 31–7
Q3	7:04	ISU	Joe Parmentier 6-yard pass from Todd Doxzon (two-point conversion failed)	IOWA 31–13
Q3	0:14	IOWA	Tavian Banks 28-yard run (Zach Bromert kick)	IOWA 38–13

Tavian Banks ran for 182 yards and 3 touchdowns as the Hawkeyes defeated the Cyclones for the 14th consecutive time.

=== at Tulsa ===
#19 Iowa at Tulsa

Team	1	2	3	4	Total
Hawkeyes	7	10	0	3	20
• Golden Hurricane	10	3	14	0	27

- Date: September 21
- Location: Skelly Stadium, Tulsa, Oklahoma
- Game attendance: 27,788
- Television network: ESPN Plus
- Sources: Box score and Game recap

Scoring summary
Q1	11:56	IOWA	Sedrick Shaw 8-yard run (Zach Bromert kick)	IOWA 7–0
Q1	8:16	Tulsa	James Anderson 37-yard field goal	IOWA 7–3
Q1	2:23	Tulsa	Wes Caswell 13-yard pass from John Fitzgerald (James Anderson kick)	Tulsa 10–7
Q2	12:52	IOWA	Tim Dwight 4-yard pass from Matt Sherman (Zach Bromert kick)	IOWA 14–10
Q2	2:27	IOWA	Brion Hurley 45-yard field goal	IOWA 17–10
Q2	0:15	Tulsa	James Anderson 29-yard field goal	IOWA 17–13
Q3	10:25	Tulsa	Reggie Williams 8-yard run (James Anderson kick)	Tulsa 20–17
Q3	2:49	Tulsa	Solomon White 2-yard run (James Anderson kick)	Tulsa 27–17
Q4	14:57	IOWA	Zach Bromert 26-yard field goal	Tulsa 27–20

=== Michigan State ===
Michigan State at Iowa

Team	1	2	3	4	Total
Spartans	17	6	7	0	30
• Hawkeyes	0	10	20	7	37

- Date: October 5
- Location: Kinnick Stadium, Iowa City, IA
- Game attendance: 70,397
- Sources: Box score and Game recap

Scoring summary
Q1	12:45	MSU	Nigea Carter 22-yard pass from Bill Burke (Chris Gardner kick)	MSU 7–0
Q1	9:12	MSU	Chris Gardner 45-yard field goal	MSU 10–0
Q1	1:12	MSU	Duane Goulbourne 1-yard run	MSU 17–0
Q2	14:08	IOWA	Chris Knipper 35-yard pass from Matt Sherman (Zach Bromert kick)	MSU 17–7
Q2	9:30	IOWA	Brion Hurley 51-yard field goal	MSU 17–10
Q2	0:56	MSU	Octavis Long 41-yard pass from Bill Burke	MSU 23–10
Q3	12:10	IOWA	Chris Knipper 35-yard pass from Matt Sherman (PAT failed)	MSU 23–16
Q3	9:37	IOWA	Sedrick Shaw 5-yard pass from Matt Sherman (Zach Bromert kick)	Tied 23–23
Q3	3:19	MSU	Sedrick Irvin 3-yard run (Chris Gardner kick)	MSU 30–23
Q3	0:52	IOWA	Tavian Banks 1-yard run (Zach Bromert kick)	Tied 30–30
Q4	12:37	IOWA	Michael Burger 8-yard run (Zach Bromert kick)	IOWA 37–30

=== at Indiana ===
Iowa at Indiana

Team	1	2	3	4	Total
• Hawkeyes	7	3	21	0	31
Hoosiers	7	0	3	0	10

- Date: October 12
- Location: Memorial Stadium, Bloomington, Indiana
- Game attendance: 37,154
- Sources: Box score and Game recap

Scoring summary
Q1	9:05	IU	Trent Jones 30-yard blocked punt return (Bill Manolopoulos kick)	IU 7–0
Q1	4:03	IOWA	Tavian Banks 9-yard run (Zach Bromert kick)	Tie 7–7
Q2	4:19	IOWA	Zach Bromert 33-yard field goal	IOWA 10–7
Q3	12:44	IU	Bill Manolopoulos 52-yard field goal	Tied 10–10
Q3	9:04	IOWA	Tavian Banks 16-yard run (Zach Bromert kick)	IOWA 17–10
Q3	8:05	IOWA	Tom Knight 57-yard interception return (Zach Bromert)	IOWA 24–10
Q3	0:00	IOWA	Tavian Banks 28-yard run (Zach Bromert kick)	IOWA 31–10

=== at No. 10 Penn State ===
Iowa at #10 Penn State

Team	1	2	3	4	Total
• Hawkeyes	7	7	0	7	21
Nittany Lions	10	10	0	0	20

- Date: October 19
- Location: Beaver Stadium, University Park, Pennsylvania
- Game attendance: 96,230
- Game weather: 48 °F (9 °C), Rain, Wind 20 mph (32 km/h)
- Referee: Steve Newman
- TV announcers (ESPN2): Charley Steiner and Rod Gilmore
- Sources: Box score Archived January 7, 2020, at the Wayback Machine

Scoring summary
Q1	12:24	PSU	Curtis Enis 12 yard pass from Wally Richardson (Brett Conway kick)	PSU 7–0
Q1	8:05	IOWA	Tim Dwight 83 yard punt return (Ryan Driscoll kick)	Tie 7–7
Q1	2:14	PSU	Brett Conway 37 yard field goal	PSU 10–7
Q2	9:35	IOWA	Tavian Banks 5 yard run (Ryan Driscoll kick)	IOWA 14–10
Q2	4:52	PSU	Aaron Harris 49 yard run (Brett Conway kick)	PSU 17–14
Q2	1:55	PSU	Brett Conway 24 yard field goal	PSU 20–14
Q4	12:49	IOWA	Tavian Banks 8 yard run (Ryan Driscoll kick)	IOWA 21–20

Highlighted by an electrifying 83-yard punt return touchdown by Tim Dwight (the first of five career punt return touchdowns), the Hawkeyes earned their first road win over a top ten opponent since the 1990 season.

=== No. 2 Ohio State ===
#2 Ohio State at #20 Iowa

Team	1	2	3	4	Total
• Buckeyes	17	14	7	0	38
Hawkeyes	3	3	6	14	26

- Date: October 26
- Location: Kinnick Stadium, Iowa City, IA
- Game start: 2:35 pm CDT
- Elapsed time: 3:30
- Game attendance: 70,397
- Game weather: 70 °F (21 °C), Mostly cloudy, Wind W 12 mph (19 km/h)
- Referee: Dick Honig
- Television network: ABC
- Sources: Box score Archived 2020-01-07 at the Wayback Machine

Scoring summary
Q1	12:56	IOWA	Brion Hurley 47-yard field goal	IOWA 3–0
Q1	4:58	OHST	Josh Jackson 27-yard field goal	Tied 3–3
Q1	3:58	OHST	Kevin Griffin recovered blocked punt in end zone (Josh Jackson kick)	OHST 10–3
Q1	1:35	OHST	David Boston 17-yard pass from Stanley Jackson (Josh Jackson kick)	OHST 17–3
Q2	14:57	OHST	John Lumpkin 3-yard pass from Stanley Jackson (Josh Jackson kick)	OHST 24–3
Q2	8:07	OHST	Joe Montgomery 1-yard run (Josh Jackson kick)	OHST 31–3
Q2	6:30	IOWA	Zach Bromert 33-yard field goal	OHST 31–6
Q3	11:28	OHST	Pepe Pearson 4-yard run (Josh Jackson kick)	OHST 38–6
Q3	2:19	IOWA	Tim Dwight 19-yard run (two-point conversion failed)	OHST 38–12
Q4	14:43	IOWA	Tim Dwight 86-yard punt return (Tavian Banks reception)	OHST 38–20
Q4	10:46	IOWA	Michael Burger 1-yard run (two point conversion failed)	OHST 38–26

ESPN's College GameDay visited Iowa City for the first time for this matchup between the #2 Buckeyes (6–0) and #20 Hawkeyes (5–1).

=== at Illinois ===
#25 Iowa at Illinois

Team	1	2	3	4	Total
• Hawkeyes	7	7	3	14	31
Fighting Illini	7	7	0	7	21

- Date: November 2
- Location: Memorial Stadium, Champaign, IL
- Game attendance: 54,381
- Television network: ESPN Plus
- Sources: Box score and Game recap

Scoring summary
Q1	7:25	IOWA	Sedrick Shaw 13-yard run (Zach Bromert kick)	IOWA 7–0
Q1	3:53	ILL	Jason Dulick 17-yard pass from Scott Weaver (Neil Rackers kick)	Tied 7–7
Q2	9:32	ILL	Wilbert Smith 16-yard fumble return (Neil Rackers kick)	Illinois 14–7
Q2	0:30	IOWA	Damon Gibson 8-yard pass from Matt Sherman (Zach Bromert kick)	Tied 14–14
Q3	5:44	IOWA	Zach Bromert 37-yard field goal	IOWA 17–14
Q4	13:10	IOWA	Vernon Rollins 20-yard interception return (Zach Bromert kick)	IOWA 24–14
Q4	4:40	IOWA	Tim Dwight 11-yard pass from Matt Sherman (Zach Bromert kick)	IOWA 31–14
Q4	2:54	ILL	Ty Douthard 1-yard run (Neil Rackers kick)	IOWA 31–21

=== Northwestern ===
#18 Northwestern at #23 Iowa

Team	1	2	3	4	Total
• Wildcats	3	10	13	14	40
Hawkeyes	0	7	0	6	13

- Date: November 9
- Location: Kinnick Stadium, Iowa City, IA
- Game attendance: 70,397
- Television network: ABC
- Sources: Box score and Game recap

Scoring summary
Q1	0:52	NW	Brian Gowins 23-yard field goal	NW 3–0
Q2	10:27	NW	Darren Drexler 23-yard pass from D'wayne Bates (Brian Gowins kick)	NW 10–0
Q2	6:48	IOWA	Tim Dwight 29-yard pass from Matt Sherman (Zach Bromert kick)	NW 10–7
Q2	0:00	NW	Brian Gowins 22-yard field goal	NW 13–7
Q3	6:32	NW	Darnell Autry 9-yard run (two point conversion failed)	NW 19–7
Q3	1:42	NW	Darnell Autry 15-yard pass from Steve Schnur (Brian Gowins kick)	NW 26–7
Q4	14:53	NW	Darnell Autry 41-yard run (Brian Gowins kick)	NW 33–7
Q4	12:19	IOWA	Tavian Banks 10-yard pass from Matt Sherman (two-point conversion failed)	NW 33–13
Q4	7:31	NW	Darnell Autry 18-yard run (Brian Gowins kick)	NW 40–13

Northwestern's Darnell Autry ran for 240 yards and scored 4 touchdowns (1 receiving). The Wildcats won back-to-back games against Iowa for the first time since 1966–67.

=== Wisconsin ===
Wisconsin vs. Iowa
rivalry game

Team	1	2	3	4	Total
Badgers	0	0	0	0	0
• Hawkeyes	10	14	7	0	31

- Date: November 16
- Location: Kinnick Stadium, Iowa City, IA
- Game start: 11:35 am CST
- Elapsed time: 2:55
- Game attendance: 66,570
- Game weather: 53 °F (12 °C), Mostly cloudy, Wind SSW 23 mph (37 km/h)
- Referee: Steve Newman
- TV announcers (ESPN): Brad Nessler, Gary Danielson, and Adrian Karsten
- Sources: Box score Archived 2020-01-07 at the Wayback Machine

Scoring summary
Q1	9:14	IOWA	Zach Bromert 36-yard field goal	IOWA 3–0
Q1	3:42	IOWA	Sedrick Shaw 29-yard run (Zach Bromert kick)	IOWA 10–0
Q2	9:07	IOWA	Chris Knipper 8-yard pass from Matt Sherman (Zach Bromert kick)	IOWA 17–0
Q2	5:13	IOWA	Sedrick Shaw 33-yard run (Zach Bromert kick)	IOWA 24–0
Q3	11:07	IOWA	Sedrick Shaw 8-yard run (Zach Bromert kick)	IOWA 31–0

After this shutout at Kinnick Stadium, the Hawkeyes had gone 17–0–1 in an 18-game stretch in the series with the Badgers that began with the 1977 game.

=== Minnesota ===
#24 Iowa at Minnesota
Battle for Floyd of Rosedale

Team	1	2	3	4	Total
• Hawkeyes	10	7	16	10	43
Golden Gophers	0	10	7	7	24

- Date: November 23
- Location: Kinnick Stadium, Iowa City, IA
- Game start: 7:35 pm CST
- Game attendance: 53,349
- Television network: ESPN2
- Sources: Box score Archived January 7, 2020, at the Wayback Machine

Scoring summary
Q1	8:54	IOWA	Sedrick Shaw 5-yard run (Zach Bromert kick)	IOWA 7–0
Q1	4:47	IOWA	Brion Hurley 50-yard field goal	IOWA 10–0
Q2	12:52	IOWA	Tim Dwight 5-yard run (Zach Bromert kick)	IOWA 17–0
Q2	6:49	Minn	Adam Bailey 20-yard field goal	IOWA 17–3
Q2	0:10	Minn	Ryan Thelwell 9-yard pass from Cory Sauter (Adam Bailey kick)	IOWA 17–10
Q3	8:16	Minn	Cory Sauter 1-yard run (Adam Bailey kick)	Tied 17–17
Q3	2:53	IOWA	Richard Willock 1-yard fumble return (Zach Bromert kick)	IOWA 24–17
Q3	2:31	IOWA	Team Safety	IOWA 26–17
Q3	0:58	IOWA	Tim Dwight 53-yard pass from Matt Sherman (Zach Bromert kick)	IOWA 33–17
Q4	11:21	IOWA	Zach Bromert 25-yard field goal	IOWA 36–17
Q4	10:10	IOWA	Sedrick Shaw 14-yard run (Zach Bromert kick)	IOWA 43–17
Q4	6:50	Minn	Ryan Thelwell 11-yard pass from Cory Sauter (Adam Bailey kick)	IOWA 43–24

=== vs. Texas Tech (Alamo Bowl) ===
Texas Tech vs. #21 Iowa
Alamo Bowl

Team	1	2	3	4	Total
Red Raiders	0	0	0	0	0
• No. 21 Hawkeyes	6	11	0	10	27

- Date: December 29
- Location: Alamodome, San Antonio, TX
- Game attendance: 55,677
- TV announcers (ESPN): Ron Franklin, Mike Gottfried, and Kellen Winslow
- Sources: Box score and Game recap

Scoring summary
Q1	11:21	IOWA	Matt Sherman 1-yard run (PAT failed)	IOWA 6–0
Q2	5:30	IOWA	Sedrick Shaw 20-yard run (Chris Knipper reception for two-point conversion)	IOWA 14–0
Q2	0:15	IOWA	Zach Bromert 36-yard field goal	IOWA 17–0
Q4	10:36	IOWA	Zach Bromert 26-yard field goal	IOWA 20–0
Q4	2:09	IOWA	Rodney Filer 14-yard run (Zach Bromert kick)	IOWA 27–0

== Roster ==
1996 Iowa Hawkeyes football team roster
Players
Coaches
Offense

Pos.	#	Name	Class
RB	22	Tavian Banks	Jr
FB	85	Michael Burger	So
WR	4	Richard Carter	Jr
WR	6	Tim Dwight	Jr
FB	34	Rodney Filer	Sr
TE	80	Zeron Flemister	Fr
WR	18	Damon Gibson	Jr
OL	79	Mike Goff	Jr
TE	81	Chris Knipper	Jr
WR	10	Demo Odems	Sr
RB	5	Sedrick Shaw	Sr
QB	12	Matt Sherman	Jr
RB	31	Rob Thein	Fr
OL	73	Ross Verba	Sr
TE	86	Austin Wheatley	Fr

Defense

Pos.	#	Name	Class
DB	9	Matt Bowen	Fr
DL	94	Jared DeVries	So
DE	9	Bill Ennis-Inge	Sr
DT	72	Epenesa Epenesa	Jr
LB	37	Matt Hughes	Sr
DB	8	Tom Knight	Sr
DB	3	Damien Robinson	Sr
LB	56	Vernon Rollins	So

Special teams

Pos.	#	Name	Class
K	38	Zach Bromert	So
P	46	Nick Gallery	Sr
K	20	Brion Hurley	Sr

Head coach

- Hayden Fry

Coordinators/assistant coaches

- Don Patterson – Offensive Coordinator
- Bob Elliott – Defensive Coordinator
- Bret Bielema – Linebackers
- Chuck Long – Defensive backs
- Bobby Diaco – Graduate assistant

Legend

- (C) Team captain
- (S) Suspended
- (I) Ineligible
- Injured
- Redshirt

Roster

== Postseason awards ==
- Tim Dwight – First-team All-American (All-purpose / kick returners)

== Team players in the 1997 NFL draft ==
Player	Position	Round	Pick	NFL club
Tom Knight	Defensive Back	1	9	Arizona Cardinals
Ross Verba	Guard	1	30	Green Bay Packers
Sedrick Shaw	Running Back	3	61	New England Patriots
Damien Robinson	Defensive Back	4	119	Philadelphia Eagles
