= 1996 Michigan State Spartans football team =

American college football season

1996 Michigan State Spartans football

Sun Bowl, L 0–38 vs. Stanford
- Conference: Big Ten Conference
- Record: 6–6 (5–3 Big Ten)
- Head coach: Nick Saban (2nd season)
- Offensive coordinator: Gary Tranquill (2nd season)
- Offensive scheme: Pro set
- Defensive coordinator: Dean Pees (2nd season)
- Base defense: 4–3
- MVP: Duane Goulbourne
- Captains: Duane Goulbourne; Ike Reese; Chris Smith
- Home stadium: Spartan Stadium

1996 Big Ten Conference football standings
	Conf.			Overall
Team	W		L	W		L
No. 2 Ohio State +	7	–	1	11	–	1
No. 15 Northwestern +	7	–	1	9	–	3
No. 7 Penn State	6	–	2	11	–	2
No. 18 Iowa	6	–	2	9	–	3
No. 20 Michigan	5	–	3	8	–	4
Michigan State	5	–	3	6	–	6
Wisconsin	3	–	5	8	–	5
Purdue	2	–	6	3	–	8
Minnesota	1	–	7	4	–	7
Indiana	1	–	7	3	–	8
Illinois	1	–	7	2	–	9
+ – Conference co-champions; Rankings from AP Poll

The 1996 Michigan State Spartans football team competed on behalf of Michigan State University as a member of the Big Ten Conference during the 1996 NCAA Division I-A football season. Led by second-year head coach Nick Saban, the Spartans compiled an overall record of 6–6 with a mark of 5–3, tying for fifth place in the Big Ten. Michigan State was invited to the Sun Bowl, where they lost to Stanford, 38–0, on December 31. The team played home games at Spartan Stadium in East Lansing, Michigan.

== Schedule ==
Date	Time	Opponent	Site	TV	Result	Attendance
August 31	12:30 p.m.	Purdue	Spartan Stadium; East Lansing, MI	ESPN	W 52–14	72,511
September 7	12:00 p.m.	at No. 1 Nebraska*	Memorial Stadium; Lincoln, NE	ABC	L 14–55	75,590
September 21	1:00 p.m.	Louisville*	Spartan Stadium; East Lansing, MI		L 20–30	70,311
September 28	12:30 p.m.	Eastern Michigan*	Spartan Stadium; East Lansing, MI	SCD	W 47–0	69,941
October 5	2:00 p.m.	at Iowa	Kinnick Stadium; Iowa City, IA		L 30–37	70,397
October 12	12:00 p.m.	Illinois^{†}	Spartan Stadium; East Lansing, MI	ESPN Plus	W 42–14	71,639
October 19	4:00 p.m.	at Minnesota	Hubert H. Humphrey Metrodome; Minneapolis, MN		W 27–9	45,434
October 26	12:30 p.m.	Wisconsin	Spartan Stadium; East Lansing, MI	ESPN2	W 30–13	69,217
November 2	12:00 p.m.	at No. 9 Michigan	Michigan Stadium; Ann Arbor, MI (rivalry)	ABC	L 29–45	106,381
November 9	1:00 p.m.	Indiana	Spartan Stadium; East Lansing, MI (rivalry)		W 38–15	64,719
November 23	3:30 p.m.	at No. 7 Penn State	Beaver Stadium; University Park, PA (rivalry)	ABC	L 29–32	96,263
December 31	2:30 p.m.	vs. Stanford*	Sun Bowl; El Paso, TX (Sun Bowl)	CBS	L 0–38	42,271
*Non-conference game; ^{†}Homecoming; Rankings from AP Poll released prior to the game; All times are in Eastern time

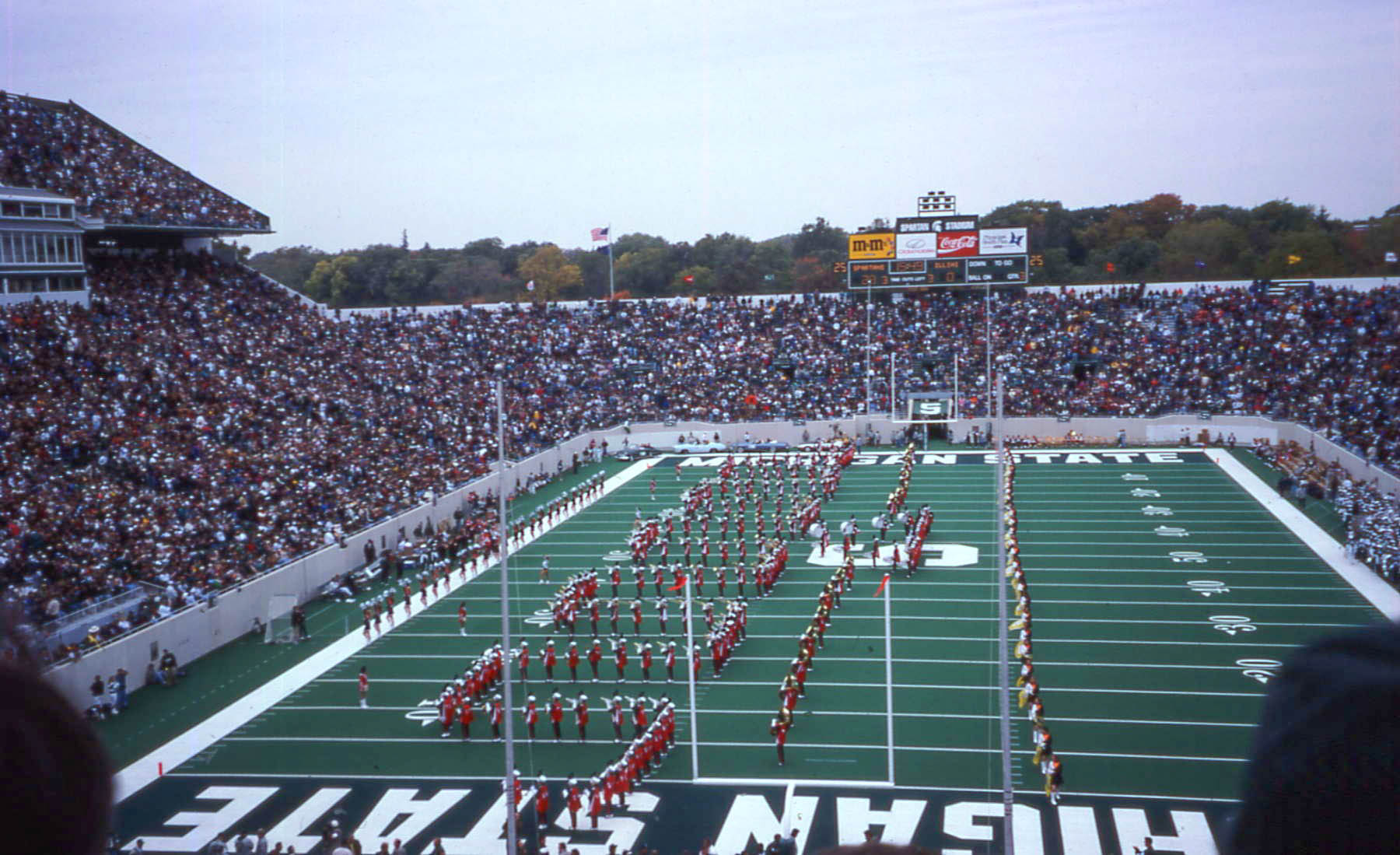
Halftime of the Michigan State vs. Illinois game on October 12

== Roster ==
1996 Michigan State Spartans football team roster
Players
Coaches
Offense

Pos.	#	Name	Class
OT	76	Flozell Adams	Jr
OL	75	Shane Adkins	Fr
OT	60	Mike Brzezinski	Fr
QB	16	Bill Burke	Fr
TE	83	Josh Keur	Jr
WR	80	Derrick Mason	Sr
WR	7	LaVaile Richardson	Fr
QB	9	Todd Schultz	Jr
G	73	Scott Shaw	Jr

Defense

Pos.	#	Name	Class
LB	25	Mike Austin	Fr
LB	38	Sean Banks	Fr
CB	3	Amp Campbell	So
DT	96	Chris Smith	Sr
S	43	Scott Ernsberger	So
LB	22	Reggie Garnett	Sr
LB	54	T.J. Henning	So
CB	36	Aldi Henry	Sr
CB	10	Ray Hill	Jr
DT	62	Robert Newkirk	Fr
LB	44	Ike Reese	Jr
DE		Jabbar Threats	Sr
DT	99	Dimitrius Underwood	So

Special teams

Pos.	#	Name	Class
K	1	Paul Edinger	Fr

Head coach

- Nick Saban

Coordinators/assistant coaches

- Gary Tranquill – Offensive coordinator/quarterbacks coach
- Bobby Williams – Running backs coach
- Charlie Baggett – Wide receivers coach
- Jim Bollman – Offensive line coach
- Dean Pees – Defensive coordinator/inside linebackers coach
- Todd Grantham – Defensive line coach
- Mark Dantonio – Defensive back coach
- Pat Shurmur – Special teams coach
- Brad Salem – Graduate assistant
- Mike Vorkapich – Graduate assistant
- Greg Colby – Assistant

Legend

- (C) Team captain
- (S) Suspended
- (I) Ineligible
- Injured
- Redshirt

Roster

== 1997 NFL draft ==
The following players were selected in the 1997 NFL draft.

Player	Round	Pick	Position	NFL team
Derrick Mason	4	98	Wide receiver	Tennessee Oilers
Nigea Carter	6	197	Wide receiver	Tampa Bay Buccaneers
