= 1996 Penn State Nittany Lions football team =

American college football season

1996 Penn State Nittany Lions football

Lambert-Meadowlands Trophy Fiesta Bowl champion

Fiesta Bowl, W 38–15 vs. Texas
- Conference: Big Ten Conference

Ranking
- Coaches: No. 7
- AP: No. 7
- Record: 11–2 (6–2 Big Ten)
- Head coach: Joe Paterno (31st season)
- Offensive coordinator: Fran Ganter (13th season)
- Offensive scheme: Pro-style
- Defensive coordinator: Jerry Sandusky (20th season)
- Base defense: 4–3
- Captains: Kim Herring; Brandon Noble; Wally Richardson; Barry Tielsch
- Home stadium: Beaver Stadium

1996 Big Ten Conference football standings
| | Conf. | | | Overall |
| Team | W | | L | W | | L |
|---|---|---|---|---|---|---|
| No. 2 Ohio State + | 7 | – | 1 | 11 | – | 1 |
| No. 15 Northwestern + | 7 | – | 1 | 9 | – | 3 |
| No. 7 Penn State | 6 | – | 2 | 11 | – | 2 |
| No. 18 Iowa | 6 | – | 2 | 9 | – | 3 |
| No. 20 Michigan | 5 | – | 3 | 8 | – | 4 |
| Michigan State | 5 | – | 3 | 6 | – | 6 |
| Wisconsin | 3 | – | 5 | 8 | – | 5 |
| Purdue | 2 | – | 6 | 3 | – | 8 |
| Minnesota | 1 | – | 7 | 4 | – | 7 |
| Indiana | 1 | – | 7 | 3 | – | 8 |
| Illinois | 1 | – | 7 | 2 | – | 9 |
+ – Conference co-champions; Rankings from AP Poll

The 1996 Penn State Nittany Lions football team represented the Pennsylvania State University as a member of the Big Ten Conference during the 1996 NCAA Division I-A football season. Led by 31st-year head coach Joe Paterno, the Nittany Lions compiled an overall record of 11–2 with a mark of 6–2 in conference play, tying for third place in the Big Ten. Penn State was invited to the Fiesta Bowl, where the Nittany Lions defeated Texas. The team played home games at Beaver Stadium in University Park, Pennsylvania.

== Schedule ==
| Date | Time | Opponent | Rank | Site | TV | Result | Attendance |
|---|---|---|---|---|---|---|---|
| August 25 | 2:00 p.m. | vs. No. 7 USC* | No. 11 | Giants Stadium; East Rutherford, NJ (Kickoff Classic) | ABC | W 24–7 | 77,716 |
| September 7 | 3:30 p.m. | Louisville* | No. 7 | Beaver Stadium; University Park, PA | ABC | W 24–7 | 95,670 |
| September 14 | 12:00 p.m. | Northern Illinois* | No. 6 | Beaver Stadium; University Park, PA | ESPN Plus | W 49–0 | 95,589 |
| September 21 | 12:00 p.m. | vs. Temple* | No. 5 | Giants Stadium; East Rutherford, NJ | ESPN Plus | W 41–0 | 24,847 |
| September 28 | 3:30 p.m. | at Wisconsin | No. 3 | Camp Randall Stadium; Madison, WI | ABC | W 23–20 | 79,607 |
| October 5 | 3:30 p.m. | at No. 3 Ohio State | No. 4 | Ohio Stadium; Columbus, OH (rivalry, College GameDay) | ABC | L 7–38 | 94,241 |
| October 12 | 12:30 p.m. | Purdue^{†} | No. 10 | Beaver Stadium; University Park, PA | ESPN | W 31–14 | 96,653 |
| October 19 | 12:30 p.m. | Iowa | No. 10 | Beaver Stadium; University Park, PA | ESPN2 | L 20–21 | 96,230 |
| October 26 | 12:30 p.m. | at Indiana | No. 17 | Memorial Stadium; Bloomington, IN | ESPN | W 48–26 | 37,354 |
| November 2 | 3:30 p.m. | No. 11 Northwestern | No. 15 | Beaver Stadium; University Park, PA | ABC | W 34–9 | 96,596 |
| November 16 | 12:00 p.m. | at No. 16 Michigan | No. 11 | Michigan Stadium; Ann Arbor, MI (rivalry) | ABC | W 29–17 | 105,898 |
| November 23 | 3:30 p.m. | Michigan State | No. 7 | Beaver Stadium; University Park, PA (rivalry) | ABC | W 32–29 | 96,263 |
| January 1, 1997 | 8:00 p.m. | vs. No. 20 Texas* | No. 7 | Sun Devil Stadium; Tempe, AZ (Fiesta Bowl) | CBS | W 38–15 | 65,106 |
*Non-conference game; ^{†}Homecoming; Rankings from AP Poll released prior to the game; All times are in Eastern time

== Roster ==
1996 Penn State Nittany Lions football team roster
Players
Coaches
Offense

| Pos. | # | Name | Class |
|---|---|---|---|
| OT | 78 | John Blick | Fr |
| WR | 11 | Chris Campbell | Sr |
| OL | 53 | Jim Dudley | Fr |
| RB | 39 | Curtis Enis | So |
| WR | 83 | Joe Jurevicius | Jr |
| QB | 9 | Mike McQueary | Jr |
| G | 64 | Phil Ostrowski | Jr |
| QB | 14 | Wally Richardson | Sr |
| QB | 16 | Kevin Thompson | Fr |

Defense

| Pos. | # | Name | Class |
|---|---|---|---|
| LB | 6 | Aaron Collins | Jr |
| S | 3 | Kim Herring | Sr |
| SS | 4 | Derek Fox | Fr |
| LB | 44 | Jim Nelson | Jr |
| CB | 27 | David Macklin | Fr |
| LB | 98 | Matt Rhule | Jr |
| DB | 45 | Jon Sandusky | Fr |
| DE | 5 | Brad Scioli | So |
| LB | 43 | Brandon Short | Fr |
| DE | 91 | Chris Snyder | Jr |

Special teams

| Pos. | # | Name | Class |
|---|---|---|---|
| K | 20 | Brett Conway | Sr |
| P | 28 | Darrell Kania | Sr |

Head coach

- Joe Paterno

Coordinators/assistant coaches

Legend

- (C) Team captain
- (S) Suspended
- (I) Ineligible
- Injured
- Redshirt

Roster

== NFL draft ==
Three Nittany Lions were drafted in the 1997 NFL draft.

| Round | Pick | Overall | Name | Position | Team |
|---|---|---|---|---|---|
| 2nd | 28 | 58 | Kim Herring | Free safety | Baltimore Ravens |
| 3rd | 30 | 90 | Brett Conway | Placekicker | Green Bay Packers |
| 7th | 33 | 234 | Wally Richardson | Quarterback | Baltimore Ravens |
