= Blackley (surname) =

Blackley is a toponymic surname that refers to the suburban area of Manchester. Notable people with the surname include:

- Adam Blackley (born 1985), Australian baseball player
- Charles Harrison Blackley (1820–1900), English physician
- Jamie Blackley (born 1991), British actor
- Jim Blackley (1927–2017), Scottish-born Canadian jazz drummer
- John Blackley (born 1948), Scottish footballer and manager
- John Blackley (politician) (1862–1952), Australian politician
- Len Blackley (1915–1983), Australian rules footballer
- Seamus Blackley, American video game designer
- Travis Blackley (born 1982), Australian baseball player
