= 1996 Eastern Michigan Eagles football team =

American college football season

1996 Eastern Michigan Eagles football
- Conference: Mid-American Conference
- Record: 3–8 (3–5 MAC)
- Head coach: Rick Rasnick (2nd season)
- Defensive coordinator: Sam Gruneisen (2nd season)
- Captains: Charlie Batch; Kevin Kwiatkowski; Matt Gregory
- Home stadium: Rynearson Stadium

1996 Mid-American Conference football standings
| | Conf. | | | Overall |
| Team | W | | L | W | | L |
|---|---|---|---|---|---|---|
| Ball State $ | 7 | – | 1 | 8 | – | 4 |
| Toledo | 6 | – | 2 | 7 | – | 4 |
| Miami (OH) | 6 | – | 2 | 6 | – | 5 |
| Ohio | 5 | – | 3 | 6 | – | 6 |
| Central Michigan | 4 | – | 4 | 5 | – | 6 |
| Akron | 3 | – | 5 | 4 | – | 7 |
| Bowling Green | 3 | – | 5 | 4 | – | 7 |
| Eastern Michigan | 3 | – | 5 | 3 | – | 8 |
| Western Michigan | 2 | – | 6 | 2 | – | 9 |
| Kent State | 1 | – | 7 | 2 | – | 9 |
$ – Conference champion

The 1996 Eastern Michigan Eagles football team represented Eastern Michigan University in the 1996 NCAA Division I-A football season. In their second season under head coach Rick Rasnick, the Eagles compiled a 3–8 record (3–5 against conference opponents), finished in eighth place in the Mid-American Conference, and were outscored by their opponents, 284 to 210. The team's statistical leaders included Walter Church with 2,151 passing yards, Mike Scott with 792 rushing yards, and Ontario Pryor with 1,031 receiving yards.

== Schedule ==
| Date | Opponent | Site | Result | Attendance | Source |
|---|---|---|---|---|---|
| August 31 | Temple* | Rynearson Stadium; Ypsilanti, MI | L 24–28 | | |
| September 7 | at Wisconsin* | Camp Randall Stadium; Madison, WI | L 3–24 | 74,279 | |
| September 14 | at Western Michigan | Waldo Stadium; Kalamazoo, MI | W 19–12 | | |
| September 21 | Toledo | Rynearson Stadium; Ypsilanti, MI | L 7–24 | | |
| September 28 | at Michigan State* | Spartan Stadium; East Lansing, MI | L 0–47 | 69,941 | |
| October 5 | at Ohio | Peden Stadium; Athens, OH | L 0–7 | | |
| October 12 | Miami (OH) | Rynearson Stadium; Ypsilanti, MI | L 25–35 | | |
| October 19 | at Central Michigan | Kelly/Shorts Stadium; Mount Pleasant, MI (rivalry) | L 36–41 | | |
| October 26 | Kent State^{†} | Rynearson Stadium; Ypsilanti, MI | W 51–10 | | |
| November 2 | Ball State | Rynearson Stadium; Ypsilanti, MI | L 25–39 | | |
| November 9 | Akron | Rynearson Stadium; Ypsilanti, MI | W 20–17 | | |
*Non-conference game; ^{†}Homecoming
