= 1996 Michigan Wolverines football team =

American college football season

1996 Michigan Wolverines football

Outback Bowl, L 14–17 vs. Alabama
- Conference: Big Ten Conference

Ranking
- Coaches: No. 20
- AP: No. 20
- Record: 8–4 (5–3 Big Ten)
- Head coach: Lloyd Carr (2nd season)
- Offensive coordinator: Fred Jackson (2nd season)
- Defensive coordinator: Greg Mattison (2nd season)
- MVP: Rod Payne
- Captains: Jarrett Irons; Rod Payne
- Home stadium: Michigan Stadium

1996 Big Ten Conference football standings
	Conf.			Overall
Team	W		L	W		L
No. 2 Ohio State +	7	–	1	11	–	1
No. 15 Northwestern +	7	–	1	9	–	3
No. 7 Penn State	6	–	2	11	–	2
No. 18 Iowa	6	–	2	9	–	3
No. 20 Michigan	5	–	3	8	–	4
Michigan State	5	–	3	6	–	6
Wisconsin	3	–	5	8	–	5
Purdue	2	–	6	3	–	8
Minnesota	1	–	7	4	–	7
Indiana	1	–	7	3	–	8
Illinois	1	–	7	2	–	9
+ – Conference co-champions; Rankings from AP Poll

The 1996 Michigan Wolverines football team represented the University of Michigan in the 1996 NCAA Division I-A football season. The team's head coach was Lloyd Carr. The Wolverines played their home games at Michigan Stadium. That year Michigan Wolverines football competed in the Big Ten Conference in almost all intercollegiate sports including men's college football. The 1996 Wolverines finished the season with an 8–4 record (5–3 in the Big Ten) and lost 17–14 to the Alabama Crimson Tide in the 1997 Outback Bowl. The team was ranked #20 in both the final coaches and AP polls.

== Schedule ==
Date	Time	Opponent	Rank	Site	TV	Result	Attendance
August 31	3:30 p.m.	Illinois	No. 12	Michigan Stadium; Ann Arbor, MI (rivalry)	ABC	W 20–8	105,992
September 14	3:30 p.m.	at No. 5 Colorado*	No. 11	Folsom Field; Boulder, CO	ABC	W 20–13	53,788
September 21	3:30 p.m.	Boston College*	No. 8	Michigan Stadium; Ann Arbor, MI	ABC	W 20–14	105,219
September 28	3:30 p.m.	UCLA*	No. 7	Michigan Stadium; Ann Arbor, MI	ABC	W 38–9	106,011
October 5	12:30 p.m.	at No. 22 Northwestern	No. 6	Dyche Stadium; Evanston, IL (rivalry)	ESPN	L 16–17	48,187
October 19	12:00 p.m.	Indiana^{†}	No. 13	Michigan Stadium; Ann Arbor, MI	ESPN Plus	W 27–20	106,088
October 26	7:00 p.m.	at Minnesota	No. 10	Hubert H. Humphrey Metrodome; Minneapolis, MN (Little Brown Jug)	ESPN2	W 44–10	41,246
November 2	12:00 p.m.	Michigan State	No. 9	Michigan Stadium; Ann Arbor, MI (rivalry)	ABC	W 45–29	106,381
November 9	12:30 p.m.	at Purdue	No. 9	Ross–Ade Stadium; West Lafayette, IN	ESPN2	L 3–9	40,624
November 16	12:00 p.m.	No. 11 Penn State	No. 16	Michigan Stadium; Ann Arbor, MI (rivalry)	ABC	L 17–29	105,898
November 23	12:00 p.m.	at No. 2 Ohio State	No. 21	Ohio Stadium; Columbus, OH (The Game)	ABC	W 13–9	94,676
January 1, 1997	11:00 a.m.	vs. No. 16 Alabama*	No. 15	Houlihan's Stadium; Tampa, FL (Outback Bowl)	ESPN	L 14–17	53,161
*Non-conference game; ^{†}Homecoming; Rankings from AP Poll released prior to the game; All times are in Eastern time

== Rankings ==
Ranking movements Legend: ██ Increase in ranking ██ Decrease in ranking
	Week																	
Poll	Pre	1	2	3	4	5	6	7	8	9	10	11	12	13	14	15	16	Final
AP	14	12	12	11	8	7	6	14	13	10	9	9	16	21	18	16	15	20
Coaches	11		10	9	7	6	5	13	12	10	9	9	16	22	19	17	17	20

== Game summaries ==
=== Illinois ===
Scott Dreisbach ran for 77 yards and a touchdown, completed 11 of 23 passes for 117 yards and threw a 10-yard touchdown pass to Russell Shaw to lead the #12 ranked Wolverines to a 20–8 victory over Illinois at Michigan Stadium. Clarence Williams added 95 yards rushing and Remy Hamilton kicked two field goals.

=== At Colorado ===
The #11 ranked Wolverines traveled to Boulder to play #5 Colorado at Folsom Field. Michigan managed only 247 yards of total offense but held on for a 20–13 victory. The Buffaloes held a 13-10 halftime lead, but the Wolverine defense shut Colorado out in the 2nd half and scored on a Remy Hamilton 42-yard field goal and a 3-yard TD pass from Scott Dreisbach to Matt Tuman to complete the comeback. Colorado had one last chance on the final play of the game from the Michigan 37 yard line. They called the same (Hail Mary) play that worked in 1994 only to have it knocked down in the end zone by Charles Woodson.

=== Boston College ===
Scott Dreisbach ran for a touchdown and completed 19 of 28 passes for 292 yards with two touchdown passes as the #8 ranked Wolverines held on for a 20–14 victory over Boston College at Michigan Stadium. Dreisbach's TD passes went to Jerame Tuman and Russell Shaw. Tuman caught 4 passes for 99 yards. Jarrett Irons led the defense with 10 tackles and an interception. Clarence Williams ran for 133 yards on 25 carries.

=== UCLA ===
Chris Howard ran for 109 yards and scored 4 touchdowns as the #7 ranked Wolverines routed UCLA 38-9 before over 106,000 fans at Michigan Stadium. Scott Dreisbach completed 13 of 25 passes for 236 yards, one a touchdown pass to Clarence Williams. Rob Sweet had an interception and Charles Woodson intercepted two passes to lead the defense.

=== At Northwestern ===
Michigan took a 16–0 lead into the 4th quarter only to see the #22 Wildcats storm back and score 17 straight points to upset the #5 Wolverines, 17–16. Brian Gowins kicked three field goals and LaValle Brown ran for a touchdown as Northwestern stunned Michigan with their 4th quarter comeback. Michigan forged a lead on Chris Howard's touchdown run and three Remy Hamilton field goals. Scott Dreisbach completed 20 of 28 passes for 214 yards. Tai Streets caught 12 of those passes for 150 yards.

=== Indiana ===
Charles Woodson scored on a 48-yard reverse and caught 4 passes for 55 yards to lead #13 Michigan to a 27–20 victory over the Hoosiers before over 106,000 fans at Michigan Stadium. John Anes added a 1-yard touchdown while Scott Dreisbach completed 17 of 35 passes for 218 yards and a touchdown pass to Jerame Tuman. Dreisbach threw two interceptions, while Clarence Williams rushed for 93 yards on 22 carries.

=== At Minnesota ===
Michigan traveled to Minneapolis to play the Golden Gophers. The #10 ranked Wolverines rolled up 489 yards of total offense as they crushed Minnesota, 44–10. Chris Howard ran for 129 yards and scored two touchdowns. Clarence Williams and John Anes both notched rushing touchdowns as well. Scott Dreisbach, Brian Griese and Tom Brady combined for 237 yards passing with Dreisbach and Griese each throwing a TD pass. Marcus Knight and Tai Streets were on the receiving end of those TD passes.

=== Michigan State ===
Michigan reclaimed the Paul Bunyan Trophy with a 45–29 victory over the Spartans before over 106,000 fans at Michigan Stadium. Chris Howard ran for 104 yards and two touchdowns while Clarence Williams added 100 yards on 19 carries. Scott Dreisbach completed 14 of 23 passes for 203 yards with 4 touchdown passes. Jerame Tuman caught two TD passes with Russell Shaw and Charles Woodson each catching one. The Wolverine defense intercepted 4 Spartan passes. Marcus Ray had two INT's while Charles Woodson and Clint Copenhaver each had one.

=== At Purdue ===
The game was tied 3-3 heading into the 4th quarter and the Boilermakers scored on a Brian Alford 5-yard pass to Rick Trefzger to upset the #9 ranked Wolverines at Ross-Ade Stadium. Michigan's only points were a Remy Hamilton 21-yard field goal. They managed only 56 yards on the ground. Scott Dreisbach completed 18 of 37 passes for 233 yards and threw two interceptions.

Quarter	1	2	3	4	Total
Michigan	0	0	3	0	3
Purdue	0	3	0	6	9

- Date: November 9
- Game time: afternoon
- Game attendance: 40,624

Scoring summary

Quarter	Time	Drive			Team	Scoring information	Score	
Quarter	Time	Plays	Yards	TOP	Team	Scoring information	Michigan	Purdue
2	7:22				Purdue	28-yard field goal by Shane Ryan	0	3
3	10:07				Michigan	21-yard field goal by Remy Hamilton	3	3
4	7:20				Purdue	Brian Alford 5-yard touchdown reception from Rick Trefzger, Shane Ryan kick no good	3	9
"TOP" = time of possession. For other American football terms, see Glossary of American football.							3	9

=== Penn State ===
The #11 ranked Nittany Lions intercepted four Michigan passes and left Michigan Stadium with a 29–17 victory over #16 Michigan. Chris Howard ran for 120 yards and a touchdown, but it wasn't enough for the Wolverines to overcome the staunch Penn State defense. Scott Dreisbach completed 12 of 26 passes for 191 yards and a 25-yard TD pass to Aaron Shea, but threw 3 interceptions. Tai Streets caught 6 passes for 93 yards.

=== At Ohio State ===
Brian Griese came off the bench to direct a comeback from a 9-0 halftime deficit and lead the Wolverines to one its most memorable comebacks against its biggest rival as they upset the #2 ranked Buckeyes, 13–9. Remy Hamilton kick two field goals (44 yards and 39 yards) which were preceded by Tai Streets 68-yard touchdown reception from Griese. Chris Howard rushed for 105 yards. Marcus Ray's interception on the final play sealed the victory for Michigan.

=== Outback Bowl ===
Alabama scored first on a 43-yard field goal from placekicker Jon Brock to take an early 3–0 lead. Remy Hamilton of Michigan answered in the second quarter with 44 and 22 yard field goals to take a 6–3 advantage at the half. In the fourth quarter, Michigan was driving for another touchdown, when Brian Griese threw a pass that was intercepted at the 12 yard line by Dwayne Rudd of Alabama, and returned 88 yards for a touchdown, and a 10–6 Alabama lead. Running back Shaun Alexander put the game out of reach with 2:46 left, by running for a 46-yard touchdown run, increasing Alabama's lead to 17–6. Griese threw a 9-yard touchdown pass to Russell Shaw to close the gap to 17–14, but that would be the final score.

== Roster ==
1996 Michigan Wolverines football team roster
Players
Coaches
Offense

Pos.	#	Name	Class
G	68	Zach Adami	Sr
QB	10	Tom Brady	So
TE	88	Mark Campbell	Jr
QB	12	Scott Dreisbach	Jr
QB	14	Brian Griese	Sr
RB	8	Chris Howard	Jr
OT	77	Jon Jansen	So
C	52	Rod Payne	Sr
TE	36	Aaron Shea	Fr
WR	86	Tai Streets	So
TE	80	Jerame Tuman	So

Defense

Pos.	#	Name	Class
LB	6	David Bowens	So
NT	96	William Carr	Sr
LB	50	David Crispin	Sr
LB	5	Mike Elston	Sr
CB	32	Bryan Williams	Sr
DT	91	Josh Williams	So
CB	2	Charles Woodson	So

Special teams

Pos.	#	Name	Class
K	19	Remy Hamilton	Sr

Head coach

- Lloyd Carr

Coordinators/assistant coaches

Legend

- (C) Team captain
- (S) Suspended
- (I) Ineligible
- Injured
- Redshirt

Roster

== Statistical achievements ==
On October 5, Tai Streets tied the school record of 12 single-game receptions set in 1958 by Brad Myers and broken in 2001 by Marquise Walker. Remy Hamilton, set the school record for consecutive field goals made (14). The closest challenger in Michigan Wolverines football history has made 9 consecutive (K.C. Lopata, 2007). The streak fell one short of Vlade Janakievski's Big Ten record set in 1979–80. Hamilton concluded his career with the 1st (25, 1994), 2nd (19, 1995) and 3rd (18, 1996) highest single-season field goal totals in Michigan history, but Garrett Rivas has tied him for second twice (2005 & 2006). Mike Gillette had previously held the record with 18 in 1988. The 25 continues to be the Big Ten record. Hamilton also established the Michigan career field goals made record (63), which Rivas has since surpassed by one. Gillette had totaled 57 in his career ending in 1988. Hamilton fell two shy of the Big Ten record by Todd Gregoire.

== Awards and honors ==
- Co-captains: Jarrett Irons, Rod Payne
- All-Americans: Rod Payne, Jarrett Irons, William Carr, Charles Woodson
- All-Conference: Jarret Irons, Rod Payne, David Bowens, William Carr, Damon Denson, Marcus Ray, Jerame Tuman, Charles Woodson
- Most Valuable Player: Rod Payne
- Meyer Morton Award: Damon Denson
- John Maulbetsch Award: Charles Woodson
- Frederick Matthei Award: Jon Jansen
- Arthur Robinson Scholarship Award: Brian Griese
- Dick Katcher Award: William Carr
- Hugh Rader Jr. Award: Rod Payne
- Robert P. Ufer Award: Damon Denson
- Roger Zatkoff Award: Jarrett Irons

== Coaching staff ==
- Head coach: Lloyd Carr
- Assistant coaches: Vance Bedford, Erik Campbell, Mike DeBord, Jim Herrmann, Brady Hoke, Fred Jackson, Greg Mattison, Bobby Morrison, Stan Parrish
- Trainer: Paul Schmidt
- Managers: Jason Armstrong, Rob Avin, Adam Bahr, Patrick Bolger, Adam Clous, Jon Datz, Jared Drinkwater, Michael Levine, Eddie Magnus, Mike Sajdak, Tibor Tuske, Mike Youtan
