= 1996 Central Michigan Chippewas football team =

American college football season

1996 Central Michigan Chippewas football
- Conference: Mid-American Conference
- Record: 5–6 (4–4 MAC)
- Head coach: Dick Flynn (3rd season)
- Offensive coordinator: Tom Kearly (6th season)
- Defensive coordinator: Jim Schulte (3rd season)
- MVP: Chad Darnell
- Home stadium: Kelly/Shorts Stadium

1996 Mid-American Conference football standings
	Conf.			Overall
Team	W		L	W		L
Ball State $	7	–	1	8	–	4
Toledo	6	–	2	7	–	4
Miami (OH)	6	–	2	6	–	5
Ohio	5	–	3	6	–	6
Central Michigan	4	–	4	5	–	6
Akron	3	–	5	4	–	7
Bowling Green	3	–	5	4	–	7
Eastern Michigan	3	–	5	3	–	8
Western Michigan	2	–	6	2	–	9
Kent State	1	–	7	2	–	9
$ – Conference champion

The 1996 Central Michigan Chippewas football team represented Central Michigan University in the Mid-American Conference (MAC) during the 1996 NCAA Division I-A football season. In their third season under head coach Dick Flynn, the Chippewas compiled a 5–6 record (4–4 against MAC opponents), finished in fifth place in the MAC, and were outscored by their opponents, 353 to 351. The team played its home games in Kelly/Shorts Stadium in Mount Pleasant, Michigan, with attendance of 100,074 in five home games.

The team's statistical leaders included quarterback Chad Darnell with 2,921 passing yards, tailback Silas Massey with 1,544 rushing yards, and flanker Reggie Allen with 1,229 receiving yards. Darnell was selected as the team's most valuable player. Massey had three 200-yard rushing games, including 292 yards against Kent State, which was at the time the third highest single game total in school history. Allen became the first Central Michigan player to total over 1,000 receiving yards, including a 229-yard game against Bowling Green.

Darnell, Massey, Allen, offensive tackle Scott Rehberg, and tight end Adam Simonson were selected as first-team All-MAC player.

== Schedule ==
Date	Opponent	Site	Result	Attendance	Source
August 31	at Boise State*	Bronco Stadium; Boise, ID	W 42–21	19,258	
September 7	at No. 23 Virginia*	Scott Stadium; Charlottesville, VA	L 21–55	41,300	
September 14	Louisiana Tech*	Kelly/Shorts Stadium; Mount Pleasant, MI	L 37–38	19,022	
September 21	Western Michigan	Kelly/Shorts Stadium; Mount Pleasant, MI (rivalry)	W 38–28		
September 28	at Bowling Green	Doyt Perry Stadium; Bowling Green, OH	L 27–31		
October 5	at Miami (OH)	Yager Stadium; Oxford, OH	L 14–46		
October 12	Akron	Kelly/Shorts Stadium; Mount Pleasant, MI	W 42–0		
October 19	Eastern Michigan	Kelly/Shorts Stadium; Mount Pleasant, MI (rivalry)	W 41–36		
October 26	Ball State	Kelly/Shorts Stadium; Mount Pleasant, MI	L 17–24		
November 2	at Kent State	Dix Stadium; Kent, OH	W 52–51		
November 9	at Toledo	Glass Bowl; Toledo, OH	L 20–23		
*Non-conference game; Rankings from AP Poll released prior to the game

== Roster ==
1996 Central Michigan Chippewas football team roster
Players
Coaches
Offense

Pos.	#	Name	Class
QB	9	Tim Crowley	Jr
WR	6	Joe Danna	So
QB	7	Chad Darnell	Sr
FB	46	Shawn Deer	Sr
TB	40	Eric Flowers	Fr
G	63	Mike Primeau	Fr
OT	79	Scott Rehberg	Sr
TE	82	Mike Wilson	Fr

Defense

Pos.	#	Name	Class
OLB	89	Joe Fortuna	Jr
SS	17	Paul Gauthier	So
DT	90	George Ghattas	So
LB	53	Cory Gildersleeve	Sr
ILB	41	Jason Gold	So
ILB	44	Jeremy Gold	So

Special teams

Pos.	#	Name	Class

Head coach

- Dick Flynn

Coordinators/assistant coaches

Legend

- (C) Team captain
- (S) Suspended
- (I) Ineligible
- Injured
- Redshirt

Roster
