= Blakney =

Blakney is a surname. Notable people with the surname include:

- Roderick Blakney (born 1976), American-born Bulgarian basketball player
- Ryan Blakney (born 1985), American baseball umpire

== See also ==
- Blackney
- Blakeney (surname)
