= 1996 Kent State Golden Flashes football team =

American college football season

1996 Kent State Golden Flashes football
- Conference: Mid-American Conference
- Record: 2–9 (1–7 MAC)
- Head coach: Jim Corrigall (3rd season)
- Offensive coordinator: Charley Molnar (3rd season)
- Defensive coordinator: Bob Junko (2nd season)
- Home stadium: Dix Stadium

1996 Mid-American Conference football standings
	Conf.			Overall
Team	W		L	W		L
Ball State $	7	–	1	8	–	4
Toledo	6	–	2	7	–	4
Miami (OH)	6	–	2	6	–	5
Ohio	5	–	3	6	–	6
Central Michigan	4	–	4	5	–	6
Akron	3	–	5	4	–	7
Bowling Green	3	–	5	4	–	7
Eastern Michigan	3	–	5	3	–	8
Western Michigan	2	–	6	2	–	9
Kent State	1	–	7	2	–	9
$ – Conference champion

The 1996 Kent State Golden Flashes football team was an American football team that represented Kent State University in the Mid-American Conference (MAC) during the 1996 NCAA Division I-A football season. In their fourth season under head coach Jim Corrigall, the Golden Flashes compiled a 2–9 record (1–7 against MAC opponents), finished in last place in the MAC, and were outscored by all opponents by a combined total of 492 to 255.

The team's statistical leaders included Astron Whatley with 1,132 rushing yards, Todd Goebbel with 2,419 passing yards, and Eugene Baker with 1,215 receiving yards.

== Schedule ==
Date	Time	Opponent	Site	Result	Attendance	Source
August 31		at Miami (OH)	Yager Stadium; Oxford, OH	L 6–64		
September 7	7:00 p.m.	at Pittsburgh*	Pitt Stadium; Pittsburgh, PA	L 14–52	24,374	
September 14	7:00 p.m.	No. 25 Youngstown State*	Dix Stadium; Kent, OH	W 28–12	23,158	
September 28		at Nevada*	Mackay Stadium; Reno, NV	L 42–63	24,430	
October 5		Akron	Dix Stadium; Kent, OH (Wagon Wheel)	W 32–17		
October 12		at Bowling Green	Doyt Perry Stadium; Bowling Green, OH (Anniversary Award)	L 24–31		
October 19		Ohio	Dix Stadium; Kent, OH	L 15–24		
October 26		at Eastern Michigan	Rynearson Stadium; Ypsilanti, MI	L 10–51		
November 2		Central Michigan	Dix Stadium; Kent, OH	L 51–52		
November 9		at Ball State	Ball State Stadium; Muncie, IN	L 6–50		
November 16		at Western Michigan	Waldo Stadium; Kalamazoo, MI	L 27–76		
*Non-conference game; Rankings from AP Poll released prior to game time; All times are in Eastern time

== Roster ==
1996 Kent State Golden Flashes football team roster
Players
Coaches
Offense

Pos.	#	Name	Class
FB	29	Leroy Arrington	Fr
WR	2	Eugene Baker	So
WR	8	Mark Britt	Jr
TE	46	Jason Gavadza	Fr
QB	13	Todd Goebbel	So
C	66	Bob Hallen	Jr
FB	35	Joe Miller	Jr
OL	75	Brian Moore	Jr
OT	78	Doug Morgan	Sr
QB	5	Marc O'Brien	Sr
QB	16	Jon Repella	Fr
TE	81	O. J. Santiago	Sr
OT	69	Todd Thompson	Fr
WR	3	Kantroy Walker	Sr
TB	4	Astron Whatley	Jr
WR	84	Jonathan Williams	Jr
QB	10	Zach Williams	Fr
OT	74	Karl Wolf	So

Defense

Pos.	#	Name	Class
DT	87	Rick Abramowski	So
LB	56	Ryan Altizer	Fr
DL	92	Richard Bender	Fr
DB	7	Tony Britt	Sr
LB	57	Dave Holderbaum	Fr
DB	26	Joe Karr	Sr
DB	19	Robert Moore	Jr
LB	1	Roger Terry	Jr

Special teams

Pos.	#	Name	Class

Head coach

- Jim Corrigall

Coordinators/assistant coaches

Legend

- (C) Team captain
- (S) Suspended
- (I) Ineligible
- Injured
- Redshirt

Roster
Last update: 1996-11-08

== Team players in the NFL ==
Player	Position	Round	Pick	NFL club
O. J. Santiago	Tight end	3	70	Atlanta Falcons
