= 1996 Illinois Fighting Illini football team =

American college football season

1996 Illinois Fighting Illini football
- Conference: Big Ten Conference
- Record: 2–9 (1–7 Big Ten)
- Head coach: Lou Tepper (5th season)
- Offensive coordinator: Paul Schudel (2nd season)
- Defensive coordinator: Denny Marcin (5th season)
- MVP: Robert Holcombe
- Captains: Rodney Byrd; Ty Douthard; Paul Marshall; Dennis Stallings
- Home stadium: Memorial Stadium

1996 Big Ten Conference football standings
	Conf.			Overall
Team	W		L	W		L
No. 2 Ohio State +	7	–	1	11	–	1
No. 15 Northwestern +	7	–	1	9	–	3
No. 7 Penn State	6	–	2	11	–	2
No. 18 Iowa	6	–	2	9	–	3
No. 20 Michigan	5	–	3	8	–	4
Michigan State	5	–	3	6	–	6
Wisconsin	3	–	5	8	–	5
Purdue	2	–	6	3	–	8
Minnesota	1	–	7	4	–	7
Indiana	1	–	7	3	–	8
Illinois	1	–	7	2	–	9
+ – Conference co-champions; Rankings from AP Poll

The 1996 Illinois Fighting Illini football team was an American football team that represented the University of Illinois at Urbana-Champaign as a member of the Big Ten Conference during the 1996 NCAA Division I-A football season. In their fifth and final year under head coach Lou Tepper, the Fighting Illini compiled a 2–9 record (1–7 in conference games), finished in a three-way tie for ninth and last place in the Big Ten, and were outscored by a total of 372 to 190.

The team's statistical leaders included quarterback Scott Weaver (1,701 passing yards), running back Robert Holcombe (1,281 rushing yards, 78 points scored), and wide receiver Jason Dulick (53 receptions for 614 yards).

The team played its home games at Memorial Stadium in Champaign, Illinois.

== Schedule ==
Date	Time	Opponent	Site	TV	Result	Attendance
August 31	2:30 pm	at No. 12 Michigan	Michigan Stadium; Ann Arbor, MI (rivalry)	ABC	L 8–20	105,992
September 7	2:30 pm	No. 19 USC*	Memorial Stadium; Champaign, IL	ABC	L 3–55	56,504
September 14	9:00 pm	at Arizona*	Arizona Stadium; Tucson, AZ	FSN	L 0–41	43,012
September 21	1:00 pm	Akron*	Memorial Stadium; Champaign, IL		W 38–7	48,285
October 5	1:00 pm	Indiana	Memorial Stadium; Champaign, IL (rivalry)		W 46–43 ^{2OT}	55,534
October 12	11:20 am	at Michigan State	Spartan Stadium; East Lansing, MI	ESPN Plus	L 14–42	71,639
October 26	11:20 am	at No. 11 Northwestern	Dyche Stadium; Evanston, IL (rivalry)	ESPN Plus	L 24–27	48,187
November 2	11:20 am	No. 25 Iowa^{†}	Memorial Stadium; Champaign, IL	ESPN Plus	L 21–31	54,381
November 9	11:30 am	No. 2 Ohio State	Memorial Stadium; Champaign, IL (Illibuck)	ESPN	L 0–48	54,412
November 16	6:00 pm	at Minnesota	Hubert H. Humphrey Metrodome; Minneapolis, MN		L 21–23	34,321
November 23	1:00 pm	Wisconsin	Memorial Stadium; Champaign, IL		L 15–35	37,814
*Non-conference game; ^{†}Homecoming; Rankings from AP Poll released prior to the game; All times are in Central time

== Roster ==
1996 Illinois Fighting Illini football team roster
Players
Coaches
Offense

Pos.	#	Name	Class
QB	15	Justin Cella	Fr
TE	86	Matt Cushing	Jr
TE	87	Mark Day	Jr
WR	1	Michael Dean	Fr
RB	7	Ty Douthard	Sr
WR	83	Jason Dulick	Sr
RB	35	Robert Holcombe	Jr
QB	9	Kirk Johnson	Fr
C	69	Chris Koerwitz	Sr
OL	72	Jay Kuchenbecker	Sr
OL	67	J. P. Machado	So
WR	22	Rob Majoy	So
WR	6	George McDonald-Ashford	So
OL	60	Ryan Schau	So
OL	62	Tom Schau	So
QB	11	Scott Weaver	Sr

Defense

Pos.	#	Name	Class
LB	48	Danny Clark	Fr
DL	92	Tom Claussen	Sr
DL	66	Garrett Johnson	So
LB	41	Eric Guenther	So
DB	39	Mike Gusich	So
DT	76	Tremaine Halley	Fr

Special teams

Pos.	#	Name	Class

Head coach

- Lou Tepper

Coordinators/assistant coaches

- Paul Schudel – Offensive coordinator

Legend

- (C) Team captain
- (S) Suspended
- (I) Ineligible
- Injured
- Redshirt

Roster
