= Jim Corrigall =

Canadian football player and coach (1946–2026)

No. 79, 66, 69
- Position: Defensive end

Personal information
- Born: May 7, 1946; Barrie, Ontario, Canada
- Died: July 15, 2026 (aged 80); Kent, Ohio, U.S.
- Listed height: 6 ft 3 in (1.91 m)
- Listed weight: 253 lb (115 kg)

Career information
- High school: Scollard Hall (North Bay, Ontario)
- College: Kent State (1967–1969)
- NFL draft: 1970: 2nd round, 33rd overall pick

Career history

Playing
- 1970–1981: Toronto Argonauts

Coaching
- 1983: Miami (OH) (Assistant coach)
- 1984–1985: NC State (Outside linebackers coach)
- 1986–1989: Akron (Outside linebackers coach)
- 1994–1997: Kent State (Head coach)
- 1998: Mount Union (Linebackers coach)
- 2001–2007: Ravenna High School (Defensive coordinator)
- 2008–2009: Hiram College (Defensive ends)
- 2010–2011: Ravenna High School (Defensive coordinator)
- 2012: Archbishop Hoban High School (Defensive line coach)
- 2020: St. Vincent–St. Mary High School (Freshmen coach)

Operations
- 1990–1993: Kent State (Assistant athletic director)

Awards and highlights
- CFL's Most Outstanding Defensive Player Award (1975); James P. McCaffrey Trophy (1975); Gruen Trophy (1970); First-team All-American (1969); 4× CFL All-Star (1971, 1973, 1975, 1977); 8× CFL East All-Star (1971–1973, 1975, 1977–1980); Kent State Golden Flashes No. 79 retired

Career CFL statistics
- Games played: 124
- Sacks: 4
- Fumble recoveries: 16
- Interceptions: 1
- Interception yards: 5
- Defensive touchdowns: 1
- Canadian Football Hall of Fame (Class of 1990)

Jim Corrigall (May 7, 1946 – July 15, 2026) was a Canadian football player and coach. He was an all-star defensive end for the Toronto Argonauts in the Canadian Football League (CFL). Corrigall served as the head football coach at Kent State University from 1994 to 1997, compiling a record of 8–35–1. He was inducted into the Canadian Football Hall of Fame in 1990.

== Early life and college ==
Corrigall played football in high school at Scollard Hall, a private boys' school in North Bay, Ontario, and Barrie North Collegiate, in Barrie, Ontario. He played his college football at Kent State University. During his outstanding university career, Corrigall was selected Most Valuable Sophomore, Best Defensive Lineman, Most Inspirational Player and he was the first Kent State player to be selected to the first team All-Mid-American Conference for three consecutive years. His jersey number 79 was retired by Kent State when he graduated.

== Professional career ==
Though drafted by the St. Louis Cardinals of the National Football League (NFL), (2nd round, 33rd overall) Corrigall went home to play an 11-year career with the Toronto Argonauts (from 1970 to 1981), including 148 regular season and five playoff games (included in those playoff appearances was the 1971 Grey Cup game). He won the Gruen Trophy as outstanding rookie in the CFL East, was named an all-star 7 times (All-Canadian 4 times) and in 1975 he won the CFL's Most Outstanding Defensive Player Award.

Corrigall was honoured as an "All-Time Argo" in 1997 for his contributions to the Argonaut team and was inducted into the Canadian Football Hall of Fame in 1990.

== Coaching career ==
Corrigall began his coaching career in 1983 as an assistant at Miami of Ohio. In 1984, he became the outside linebackers coach at NC State. In 1986, he took the same job at Akron.

In 1990, Corrigall returned to his alma mater, Kent State, as assistant athletic director. In this role, he oversaw Kent State's athletic facilities and operations. He returned to the sidelines as an interim assistant coach in 1992. In December 1993, Corrigall was named associate head coach of the Kent State football team. Two months later, head coach Pete Cordelli was fired and Corrigall was promoted to succeed him. The program had been struggling for years when he arrived and had just come off a winless season in 1993. Although some progress was made, the Golden Flashes best season under Corrigall, a 3–8 campaign, proved to be his last in 1997. Three wins in 1997 were the most wins for Kent State since 1988. Corrigall had an overall record of 8–35–1 in four seasons.

In 1998, Corrigall was an assistant with the NCAA Division III champion Mount Union Purple Raiders. He then worked as a history and physical education and was the defensive coordinator at Ravenna High School in Akron, Ohio. In 2008 and 2009, he was the defensive ends coach at Hiram College, another NCAA Division III program. In 2010, he returned to Ravenna.

In 2012, Corrigall was the defensive line coach for Archbishop Hoban High School (Akron, OH). He helped lead the Knights to an undefeated season. As of October 2020, Corrigall was the head coach for the freshmen team at St. Vincent–St. Mary High School.

== Death ==
Corrigall died on July 15, 2026, at the age of 80. His death was publicly announced by his alma mater, Kent State University.

While an official cause of death was not immediately released by the university, Corrigall and his daughter had publicly shared in 2019 that he had been diagnosed with likely chronic traumatic encephalopathy (CTE), a progressive degenerative brain disease linked to repetitive head injuries sustained during his football career.

== Head coaching record ==
Year	Team	Overall	Conference	Standing	Bowl/playoffs
Kent State Golden Flashes (Mid-American Conference) (1994–1997)
1994	Kent State	2–9	2–7	8th	
1995	Kent State	1–9–1	0–7–1	10th	
1996	Kent State	2–9	1–7	10th	
1997	Kent State	3–8	3–5	T–4th (East)	
Kent State:		8–35–1	6–26–1		
Total:		8–35–1			
