= 1996 Bowling Green Falcons football team =

American college football season

1996 Bowling Green Falcons football
- Conference: Mid-American Conference
- Record: 4–7 (3–5 MAC)
- Head coach: Gary Blackney (6th season)
- Offensive coordinator: Mike Faragalli (1st season)
- Defensive coordinator: Paul Ferraro (6th season)
- Home stadium: Doyt Perry Stadium

1996 Mid-American Conference football standings
	Conf.			Overall
Team	W		L	W		L
Ball State $	7	–	1	8	–	4
Toledo	6	–	2	7	–	4
Miami (OH)	6	–	2	6	–	5
Ohio	5	–	3	6	–	6
Central Michigan	4	–	4	5	–	6
Akron	3	–	5	4	–	7
Bowling Green	3	–	5	4	–	7
Eastern Michigan	3	–	5	3	–	8
Western Michigan	2	–	6	2	–	9
Kent State	1	–	7	2	–	9
$ – Conference champion

The 1996 Bowling Green Falcons football team was an American football team that represented Bowling Green University in the Mid-American Conference (MAC) during the 1996 NCAA Division I-A football season. In their sixth season under head coach Gary Blackney, the Falcons compiled a 4–7 record (3–5 against MAC opponents), finished in sixth place in the MAC, and were outscored by all opponents by a combined total of 240 to 176.

The team's statistical leaders included Bob Niemet with 1,129 passing yards, Courtney Davis with 767 rushing yards, and Damron Hamilton with 465 receiving yards.

== Schedule ==
Date	Opponent	Site	Result	Attendance	Source
August 31	at No. 13 Alabama*	Legion Field; Birmingham, AL	L 7–21	76,878	
September 14	Temple*	Doyt Perry Stadium; Bowling Green, OH	W 20–16		
September 21	at Miami (OH)	Yager Stadium; Oxford, OH	W 14–10		
September 28	Central Michigan	Doyt Perry Stadium; Bowling Green, OH	W 31–27		
October 5	at Toledo	Glass Bowl; Toledo, OH (rivalry)	L 16–24		
October 12	Kent State	Doyt Perry Stadium; Bowling Green, OH (Anniversary Award)	W 31–24		
October 19	Ball State	Doyt Perry Stadium; Bowling Green, OH	L 11–16		
October 26	at Ohio	Peden Stadium; Athens, OH	L 0–38		
November 2	at Akron	Rubber Bowl; Akron, OH	L 14–21		
November 9	Western Michigan	Doyt Perry Stadium; Bowling Green, OH	L 13–16 ^{OT}		
November 16	at UCF*	Florida Citrus Bowl; Orlando, FL	L 19–27	14,112	
*Non-conference game; Rankings from AP Poll released prior to the game

== Roster ==
1996 Bowling Green Falcons football team roster
Players
Coaches
Offense

Pos.	#	Name	Class
QB	11	Mark Molk	So
QB	12	Bob Niemet	Jr

Defense

Pos.	#	Name	Class
DB	18	Tyrone Cole	So
DB	27	Andre Ventress	Fr
LB	30	Kevin O'Neill	Sr
LB	43	Joe O'Neill	So
DL	45	Dan King	So
DB	46	Eric Arnold	Jr
LB	47	Adam Lige	Jr

Special teams

Pos.	#	Name	Class

Head coach

- Gary Blackney

Coordinators/assistant coaches

{{{asst_coach}}}

Legend

- (C) Team captain
- (S) Suspended
- (I) Ineligible
- Injured
- Redshirt

Roster
Last update: 1997-07-30
