= Catherine Kaidyee Blaikley =

18th-century American landowner and midwife

Catherine Kaidyee Blaikley (c. 1695 – 1771) was an 18th-century American landowner and midwife, best known for claims that she had delivered over 3,000 children.

== Biography ==
Catherine Blaikley was born around 1695 to William and Martha Kaidyee, in York County, Virginia. She was the couple's only daughter and had two brothers. Catherine married her husband William Blaikley, a merchant and watchmaker, on September 11, 1718. The Blaikleys had at least five children together, two of which were boys who died at a young age. The family resided in what is now known as the Catherine Blaikley House on Duke of Gloucester Street in Williamsburg, Virginia. Later, an inventory of the estate would reveal that the family enjoyed a comfortable living with luxuries such as silver spoons and slaves. William Blaikley died in May 1736, leaving Catherine a widow for 35 years.

Upon her husband's death, Catherine Blaikley inherited all of his property which included 50 acres of land in Henrico County, a mill in Brunswick, and the family homestead. Economic opportunities for women were limited during this time period, but midwifery was considered to be an appropriate occupation, as was offering lodging, which Blaikley also did. Financial records indicate that Blaikley was able to maintain her standard of living. An advertisement she placed looking for her red Moracco pocketbook, suggested she had possession of paper money and access to drugs.

Blaikley died in October 1771 and was buried in the cemetery at Bruton Parish Church. An obituary ran in one of the newspapers of the day and described her as an "eminent midwife." In the 1950s Colonial Williamsburg restored Blaikley's home and it is now a historical tourist site.

== Career ==
It is unknown exactly when Blaikley began working as a midwife but historian Linda Sturz has stated that it was likely around three years after the death of her husband. Midwifery, or the care of women before, during, and after birth, was a common and respectable occupation during this time and was often a full-time job. This was one of the few medically related careers that did not discriminate against women worldwide. However, women were expected to call upon a physician should severe complications arise. In America, before the revolution and medical schools were in place, there were no restrictions on women to practice medicine, so it is likely Blaikley dealt with these issues on her own. Blaikley was reported to have delivered upwards of three thousand children, presumably both free and enslaved. Blaikley supplemented her income by lodging politicians, businessmen, and other important figures traveling through Virginia's capital.
