= Gary Blackney =

American football player and coach (born 1944)

Biographical details
- Born: December 10, 1944 (age 81); Plainview, New York, U.S.

Playing career
- 1965–1966: Connecticut
- Positions: Running back, defensive back

Coaching career (HC unless noted)
- 1968–1969: UConn (GA)
- 1970–1972: Brown (DB)
- 1973–1974: Rhode Island (OB)
- 1975–1976: Wisconsin (DB)
- 1977: Wisconsin (DC/DB)
- 1978–1979: UCLA (DB)
- 1981–1983: Syracuse (DB)
- 1984: Ohio State (DB)
- 1985–1987: Ohio State (DC)
- 1988–1990: Ohio State (ILB)
- 1991–2000: Bowling Green
- 2001–2005: Maryland (DC)
- 2008: UCF (DB)

Head coaching record
- Overall: 60–50–2
- Bowls: 2–0

Accomplishments and honors

Championships
- 2 MAC (1991–1992)

Awards
- 2× MAC Coach of the Year (1991–1992)

Gary Blackney (born December 12, 1944) is an American former college football coach. He served as the head football coach at Bowling Green State University from 1991 to 2000. Blackney also worked as an assistant football coach at Ohio State University, Syracuse University, University of California, Los Angeles (UCLA), the University of Wisconsin–Madison, the University of Rhode Island, the University of Central Florida (UCF), and Brown University. He was the defensive coordinator at University of Maryland, College Park from 2001 to 2005. He retired from coaching after the 2008 season.

== Head coaching record ==
Year	Team	Overall	Conference	Standing	Bowl/playoffs
Bowling Green Falcons (Mid-American Conference) (1991–2000)
1991	Bowling Green	11–1	8–0	1st	W California
1992	Bowling Green	10–2	8–0	1st	W Las Vegas
1993	Bowling Green	6–3–2	5–1–2	3rd	
1994	Bowling Green	9–2	7–1	2nd	
1995	Bowling Green	5–6	3–5	6th	
1996	Bowling Green	4–7	4–4	5th	
1997	Bowling Green	3–8	3–5	T–4th (East)	
1998	Bowling Green	5–6	5–3	T–3rd (East)	
1999	Bowling Green	5–6	3–5	5th (East)	
2000	Bowling Green	2–9	2–6	T–5th (East)	
Bowling Green:		60–50–2	48–30–2		
Total:		60–50–2			
National championship Conference title Conference division title or championship game berth
