= Len Blackley =

Australian rules footballer, born 1915

Personal information
- Full name: Leonard Charles Blackley
- Born: 2 March 1915; Clifton Hill, Victoria
- Died: 27 March 1983 (aged 68); Rosebud, Victoria
- Original team: Brunswick

Playing career^{1}
Years	Club	Games (Goals)
1935	Fitzroy	2 (2)
- ^{1} Playing statistics correct to the end of 1935.

Leonard Charles Blackley (2 March 1915 – 27 March 1983) was an Australian rules footballer who played with Fitzroy in the Victorian Football League (VFL).
