= Jim Blackley =

Background information
- Birth name: James David Blackley
- Born: March 4, 1927; Edinburgh, Scotland
- Died: July 16, 2017 (aged 90); Barrie, Ontario, Canada
- Occupation(s): Drum teacher, author
- Instrument: Drums
- Website: www.jimblackley.com

James David Blackley (March 4, 1927 – July 16, 2017) was a Scottish-born Canadian jazz-focused drumkit teacher.

Blackley lived and taught in Barrie, Ontario, Canada, offering monthly sessions to Canadian students and 10-day master classes to professional musicians from around the globe. He died on July 16, 2017, at the age of 90.
