= 1996 Northwestern Wildcats football team =

American college football season

1996 Northwestern Wildcats football

Big Ten co-champion

Florida Citrus Bowl, L 28–48 vs. Tennessee
- Conference: Big Ten Conference

Ranking
- Coaches: No. 16
- AP: No. 15
- Record: 9–3 (7–1 Big Ten)
- Head coach: Gary Barnett (5th season)
- Offensive coordinator: Greg Meyer (5th season)
- Defensive coordinator: Ron Vanderlinden (5th season)
- Captains: Justin Chabot; Pat Fitzgerald; Mike McGrew; Steve Schnur
- Home stadium: Dyche Stadium

1996 Big Ten Conference football standings
	Conf.			Overall
Team	W		L	W		L
No. 2 Ohio State +	7	–	1	11	–	1
No. 15 Northwestern +	7	–	1	9	–	3
No. 7 Penn State	6	–	2	11	–	2
No. 18 Iowa	6	–	2	9	–	3
No. 20 Michigan	5	–	3	8	–	4
Michigan State	5	–	3	6	–	6
Wisconsin	3	–	5	8	–	5
Purdue	2	–	6	3	–	8
Minnesota	1	–	7	4	–	7
Indiana	1	–	7	3	–	8
Illinois	1	–	7	2	–	9
+ – Conference co-champions; Rankings from AP Poll

The 1996 Northwestern Wildcats football team represented Northwestern University in the 1996 NCAA Division I-A football season. Under head coach Gary Barnett, Northwestern finished the season with a 9–3 record. The Wildcats won a share of the Big Ten Conference title. They faced off against Tennessee in the Florida Citrus Bowl, where the Wildcats lost, 48–28.

== Schedule ==
Date	Time	Opponent	Rank	Site	TV	Result	Attendance	Source
September 7	5:30 pm	at Wake Forest*	No. 13	Groves Stadium; Winston-Salem, NC	SCC	L 27–28	21,749	
September 14	2:30 pm	at Duke*		Wallace Wade Stadium; Durham, NC	ABC	W 38–13	29,321	
September 21	11:30 am	Ohio*		Dyche Stadium; Evanston, IL	SCC	W 28–7	38,148	
September 28	11:30 am	at Indiana	No. 25	Memorial Stadium; Bloomington, IN	ESPN	W 35–17	36,714	
October 5	11:30 am	No. 6 Michigan	No. 22	Dyche Stadium; Evanston, IL (rivalry)	ESPN	W 17–16	48,187	
October 12	11:30 am	Minnesota	No. 15	Dyche Stadium; Evanston, IL	ESPN2	W 26–24	35,848	
October 19	11:30 am	at Wisconsin	No. 14	Camp Randall Stadium; Madison WI	ESPN2	W 34–30	79,576	
October 26	11:00 am	Illinois	No. 11	Dyche Stadium; Evanston, IL (rivalry)	ESPN Plus	W 27–24	48,187	
November 2	2:30 pm	at No. 15 Penn State	No. 11	Beaver Stadium; University Park, PA	ABC	L 9–34	96,596	
November 9	2:30 pm	at No. 23 Iowa	No. 18	Kinnick Stadium; Iowa City, IA	ABC	W 40–13	70,397	
November 16	1:00 pm	Purdue	No. 13	Dyche Stadium; Evanston, IL		W 27–24	41,178	
January 1	12:00 pm	vs. No. 9 Tennessee*	No. 11	Florida Citrus Bowl; Orlando, FL (Florida Citrus Bowl)	ABC	L 28–48	63,467	
*Non-conference game; Rankings from AP Poll released prior to the game; All times are in Central time

== Rankings ==
Ranking movements Legend: ██ Increase in ranking ██ Decrease in ranking — = Not ranked
	Week																	
Poll	Pre	1	2	3	4	5	6	7	8	9	10	11	12	13	14	15	16	Final
AP	18	15	13	—	—	25	22	15	14	11	11	18	13	11	11	10	11	15
Coaches	19		18	—	—	—	—	18	15	12	10	18	14	11	11	12	11	16

== Game summaries ==
=== at Wisconsin ===
#14 Northwestern at Wisconsin

Team	1	2	3	4	Total
• Wildcats	7	7	6	14	34
Badgers	10	3	3	14	30

- Date: October 19
- Location: Camp Randall Stadium • Madison, Wisconsin
- Game attendance: 79,576
- Game weather: Sunny
- TV announcers (ESPN): Brad Nessler and Gary Danielson

Scoring summary
1	13:44	WIS	Bob Adamov recovered fumble in end zone (John Hall kick)	Wisconsin 7-0
1	9:08	NW	Darnell Autry 20-yard run (Brian Gowins kick)	Tie 7-7
1	3:53	WIS	John Hall 50-yard field goal	Wisconsin 10-7
2	9:15	WIS	John Hall 29-yard field goal	Wisconsin 13-7
2	3:59	NW	D'Wayne Bates 12-yard pass from Steve Schnur (Brian Gowins kick)	Northwestern 14-13
3	9:58	WIS	John Hall 21-yard field goal	Wisconsin 16-14
3	4:38	NW	Adrian Autry 14-yard run (two-point conversion failed)	Northwestern 20-16
4	14:57	WIS	Ron Dayne 7-yard run (John Hall kick)	Wisconsin 23-20
4	13:31	WIS	Cecil Martin 2-yard run (John Hall kick)	Wisconsin 30-20
4	5:02	NW	Adrian Autry 2-yard run (Brian Gowins kick)	Wisconsin 30-27
4	:37	NW	D'Wayne Bates 20-yard pass from Steve Schnur (Brian Gowins kick)	Northwestern 34-30

=== at No. 23 Iowa ===
#18 Northwestern at #23 Iowa

Team	1	2	3	4	Total
• Wildcats	3	10	13	14	40
Hawkeyes	0	7	0	6	13

- Date: November 9
- Location: Kinnick Stadium • Iowa City, IA
- Game attendance: 70,397
- Television network: ABC

Scoring summary
1	0:52	NW	Brian Gowins 23-yard field goal	NW 3–0
2	10:27	NW	Darren Drexler 23-yard pass from D'wayne Bates (Brian Gowins kick)	NW 10–0
2	6:48	IOWA	Tim Dwight 29-yard pass from Matt Sherman (Zach Bromert kick)	NW 10–7
2	0:00	NW	Brian Gowins 22-yard field goal	NW 13–7
3	6:32	NW	Darnell Autry 9-yard run (two point conversion failed)	NW 19–7
3	1:42	NW	Darnell Autry 15-yard pass from Steve Schnur (Brian Gowins kick)	NW 26–7
4	14:53	NW	Darnell Autry 41-yard run (Brian Gowins kick)	NW 33–7
4	12:19	IOWA	Tavian Banks 10-yard pass from Matt Sherman (two-point conversion failed)	NW 33–13
4	7:31	NW	Darnell Autry 18-yard run (Brian Gowins kick)	NW 40–13

Darnell Autry ran for 240 yards and 4 touchdowns. The Wildcats won back-to-back games against Iowa for the first time since 1966–67.

=== vs. No. 9 Tennessee (Florida Citrus Bowl) ===
#9 Tennessee vs. #11 Northwestern

Team	1	2	3	4	Total
• Volunteers	21	10	7	10	48
Wildcats	0	21	0	7	28

- Date: January 1
- Location: Florida Citrus Bowl • Orland, FL
- Game attendance: 63,467
- Game weather: 79°, Partly Cloudy, Calm
- Television network: ABC

== Roster ==
1996 Northwestern Wildcats football team roster
Players
Coaches
Offense

Pos.	#	Name	Class
RB	32	Adrian Autry	Jr
RB	24	Darnell Autry	Jr
WR	5	D'Wayne Bates	So
G	61	Justin Chabot (C)	Sr
QB	8	Tim Hughes	Sr
OT	74	Paul Janus	Sr
WR	22	Brian Musso	Jr
QB	10	Steve Schnur (C)	Sr
WR	25	Jeff Swenson	Jr
TE	84	Jay Tant	Fr

Defense

Pos.	#	Name	Class
SS	33	Eric Collier	Sr
DE	36	Casey Dailey	Jr
LB	51	Pat Fitzgerald (C)	Sr
LB	55	Barry Gardner	So
CB	3	Hudhaifa Ismaeli	Jr
LB	44	Keith Lozowski	Sr
DT	94	Joe Reiff	Sr
DT	95	Matt Rice	Sr
DT	96	Ray Robey	Sr
LB	59	Jason Ross	Jr
LB	52	Tim Scharf	Sr
DE	90	Thor Schmidt	So

Special teams

Pos.	#	Name	Class
P	14	Paul Burton	Sr
K	13	Brian Gowins	Jr

Head coach

- Gary Barnett

Coordinators/assistant coaches

Legend

- (C) Team captain
- (S) Suspended
- (I) Ineligible
- Injured
- Redshirt

Roster

== Awards and honors ==
- Linebacker Pat Fitzgerald: Chuck Bednarik Award, Bronko Nagurski Trophy, Big Ten Defensive Player of the Year
- Head coach Gary Barnett: Big Ten Coach of the Year

== Team players drafted into the NFL ==
Player	Position	Round	Pick	NFL club
Darnell Autry	Running back	4	105	Chicago Bears
Tim Scharf	Linebacker	6	164	New York Jets
Hudhaifa Ismaeli	Defensive back	7	203	Miami Dolphins
