= 1996 Indiana Hoosiers football team =

American college football season

1996 Indiana Hoosiers football
- Conference: Big Ten Conference
- Record: 3–8 (1–7 Big Ten)
- Head coach: Bill Mallory (13th season)
- MVP: Alex Smith
- Captains: Jamie Baisley; Matt Surface
- Home stadium: Memorial Stadium

1996 Big Ten Conference football standings
| | Conf. | | | Overall |
| Team | W | | L | W | | L |
|---|---|---|---|---|---|---|
| No. 2 Ohio State + | 7 | – | 1 | 11 | – | 1 |
| No. 15 Northwestern + | 7 | – | 1 | 9 | – | 3 |
| No. 7 Penn State | 6 | – | 2 | 11 | – | 2 |
| No. 18 Iowa | 6 | – | 2 | 9 | – | 3 |
| No. 20 Michigan | 5 | – | 3 | 8 | – | 4 |
| Michigan State | 5 | – | 3 | 6 | – | 6 |
| Wisconsin | 3 | – | 5 | 8 | – | 5 |
| Purdue | 2 | – | 6 | 3 | – | 8 |
| Minnesota | 1 | – | 7 | 4 | – | 7 |
| Indiana | 1 | – | 7 | 3 | – | 8 |
| Illinois | 1 | – | 7 | 2 | – | 9 |
+ – Conference co-champions; Rankings from AP Poll

The 1996 Indiana Hoosiers football team represented Indiana University Bloomington as a member of the Big Ten Conference during the 1996 NCAA Division I-A football season. Led by Bill Mallory in his 13th and final season as head coach, the Hoosiers compiled an overall record of 3–8 with a mark of 1–7 in conference play, placing in a three-way tie for ninth in the Big Ten. The team played home games at Memorial Stadium in Bloomington, Indiana.

Mallory was fired at the end of the season.

== Schedule ==
| Date | Time | Opponent | Site | TV | Result | Attendance | Source |
|---|---|---|---|---|---|---|---|
| September 7 | 7:00 pm | at Toledo* | Glass Bowl; Toledo, OH | | W 40–6 | 25,540 | |
| September 14 | 6:00 pm | Miami (OH)* | Memorial Stadium; Bloomington, IN | | W 21–14 | 31,584 | |
| September 21 | 7:00 pm | at Kentucky* | Commonwealth Stadium; Lexington, KY (rivalry) | | L 0–3 | 40,500 | |
| September 28 | 12:30 pm | No. 25 Northwestern | Memorial Stadium; Bloomington, IN | ESPN | L 17–35 | 36,714 | |
| October 5 | 2:00 pm | at Illinois | Memorial Stadium; Champaign, IL (rivalry) | | L 43–46 ^{2OT} | 55,534 | |
| October 12 | 2:00 pm | Iowa^{†} | Memorial Stadium; Bloomington, IN | | L 10–31 | 37,154 | |
| October 19 | 12:00 pm | at No. 13 Michigan | Michigan Stadium; Ann Arbor, MI | ESPN Plus | L 20–27 | 106,088 | |
| October 26 | 12:30 pm | No. 17 Penn State | Memorial Stadium; Bloomington, IN | ESPN | L 26–48 | 37,584 | |
| November 9 | 1:00 pm | at Michigan State | Spartan Stadium; East Lansing, MI (rivalry) | | L 15–38 | 64,719 | |
| November 16 | 3:30 pm | No. 2 Ohio State | Memorial Stadium; Bloomington, IN | ABC | L 17–27 | 49,271 | |
| November 23 | 1:00 pm | at Purdue | Ross–Ade Stadium; West Lafayette, IN (Old Oaken Bucket) | | W 33–16 | 50,750 | |
*Non-conference game; ^{†}Homecoming; Rankings from AP Poll released prior to the game; All times are in Eastern time

== Roster ==
1996 Indiana Hoosiers football team roster
Players
Coaches
Offense

| Pos. | # | Name | Class |
|---|---|---|---|
| WR | 8 | Brian Coleman | So |
| WR | 87 | Robert Curley | Fr |
| QB | 14 | Chris Dittoe | Sr |
| FB | 40 | Chris Gall | So |
| OT | 62 | Greg Jenkins | So |
| OT | 71 | Jeremy Johnson | Fr |
| C | 57 | Josh Johnson | Jr |
| OT | 74 | Chris Liwienski | Jr |
| G | 60 | Tom Lukawski | Sr |
| WR | 16 | Ajamu Stoner | Sr |

Defense

| Pos. | # | Name | Class |
|---|---|---|---|
| FS | 27 | Eric Allen | Sr |
| DT | 76 | Victor Allotey | Jr |
| LB | 45 | Jamie Baisley | Sr |
| LB | 48 | Mike Belu | So |
| DE | 46 | Brian Bobay | So |
| DE | 82 | Brad Bostic | Jr |
| DT | 96 | Yeronimo Ciriaco | Fr |
| DE | 68 | Jason Czap | Fr |
| DE | 98 | Nathan Davis | Sr |
| CB | 31 | Joey Eloms | Jr |
| LB | 39 | Jason Storbeck | Fr |
| SS | 13 | Kywin Supernaw | Jr |
| LB | 47 | Matt Surface | Sr |

Special teams

| Pos. | # | Name | Class |

Head coach

- Bill Mallory

Coordinators/assistant coaches

- Kit Cartwright (PCG)

Legend

- (C) Team captain
- (S) Suspended
- (I) Ineligible
- Injured
- Redshirt

Roster

== 1997 NFL draftees ==
| Player | Round | Pick | Position | NFL team |
|---|---|---|---|---|
| Nathan Davis | 2 | 32 | Defensive tackle | Atlanta Falcons |
| Steve Lee | 6 | 167 | Running back | Baltimore Ravens |
