= 1996 Ohio State Buckeyes football team =

American college football season

1996 Ohio State Buckeyes football

Big Ten co-champion Rose Bowl champion

Rose Bowl, W 20–17 vs. Arizona State
- Conference: Big Ten Conference

Ranking
- Coaches: No. 2
- AP: No. 2
- Record: 11–1 (7–1 Big Ten)
- Head coach: John Cooper (9th season)
- Offensive coordinator: Joe Hollis (5th season)
- Offensive scheme: Singleback
- Defensive coordinator: Fred Pagac (1st season)
- Base defense: 4–3
- MVP: Orlando Pace
- Captains: Juan Porter; Greg Bellisari
- Home stadium: Ohio Stadium

1996 Big Ten Conference football standings
	Conf.			Overall
Team	W		L	W		L
No. 2 Ohio State +	7	–	1	11	–	1
No. 15 Northwestern +	7	–	1	9	–	3
No. 7 Penn State	6	–	2	11	–	2
No. 18 Iowa	6	–	2	9	–	3
No. 20 Michigan	5	–	3	8	–	4
Michigan State	5	–	3	6	–	6
Wisconsin	3	–	5	8	–	5
Purdue	2	–	6	3	–	8
Minnesota	1	–	7	4	–	7
Indiana	1	–	7	3	–	8
Illinois	1	–	7	2	–	9
+ – Conference co-champions; Rankings from AP Poll

The 1996 Ohio State Buckeyes football team was an American football team that represented the Ohio State University as a member of the Big Ten Conference during the 1996 NCAA Division I-A football season. In their ninth year under head coach John Cooper, the Buckeyes compiled an 11–1 record (7–1 in conference games), tied with Northwestern for the Big Ten championship, and outscored opponents by a total of 455 to 131. Against ranked opponents, the Buckeyes defeated No. 5 Notre Dame, No. 4 Penn State, and No. 20 Iowa, but lost to No. 21 Michigan in the final game of the regular season. The Buckeyes concluded the season with a 20–17 victory over No. 2 Arizona State in the 1997 Rose Bowl. Ohio State was ranked No. 2 in the final AP poll.

The Buckeyes gained an average of 217.2 rushing yards and 196.3 passing yards per game. On defense, they gave up 89.5 rushing yards and 133.5 passing yards per game. Quarterback duties were split between junior Stanley Jackson (1,239 passing yards) and sophomore Joe Germaine (1,062 passing yards). The team's other statistical leaders included running back Pepe Pearson (1,373 rushing yards) and wide receiver Dimitrious Stanley (38 receptions for 705 yards). Offensive tackle Orlando Pace, defensive end Mike Vrabel, and defensive back Shawn Springs were selected as consensus first-team All-Americans. Four Ohio State players received first-team honors on the 1996 All-Big Ten Conference football team: Pace (Coaches/Media); Vrabel (Coaches/Media); Springs (Coaches/Media); and defensive end Matt Finkes (Coaches/Media).

The team played its home games at Ohio Stadium in Columbus, Ohio.

== Schedule ==
Date	Time	Opponent	Rank	Site	TV	Result	Attendance
September 7	12:00 p.m.	Rice*	No. 10	Ohio Stadium; Columbus, OH	ESPN Plus	W 70–7	93,479
September 21	12:30 p.m.	Pittsburgh*	No. 7	Ohio Stadium; Columbus, OH	ESPN	W 72–0	93,959
September 28	2:30 p.m.	at No. 5 Notre Dame*	No. 4	Notre Dame Stadium; Notre Dame, IN (College GameDay)	NBC	W 29–16	59,075
October 5	3:30 p.m.	No. 4 Penn State	No. 3	Ohio Stadium; Columbus, OH (rivalry, College GameDay)	ABC	W 38–7	94,241
October 12	3:30 p.m.	Wisconsin	No. 2	Ohio Stadium; Columbus, OH	ABC	W 17–14	94,215
October 19	3:30 p.m.	at Purdue	No. 2	Ross–Ade Stadium; West Lafayette, IN	ABC	W 42–14	60,172
October 26	3:30 p.m.	at No. 20 Iowa	No. 2	Kinnick Stadium; Iowa City, IA (College GameDay)	ABC	W 38–26	70,397
November 2	12:30 p.m.	Minnesota	No. 2	Ohio Stadium; Columbus, OH	ESPN2	W 45–0	93,588
November 9	12:30 p.m.	at Illinois	No. 2	Memorial Stadium; Champaign, IL (Illibuck)	ESPN	W 48–0	54,412
November 16	3:30 p.m.	at Indiana	No. 2	Memorial Stadium; Bloomington, IN	ABC	W 27–17	49,271
November 23	12:00 p.m.	No. 21 Michigan	No. 2	Ohio Stadium; Columbus, OH (rivalry)	ABC	L 9–13	94,676
January 1, 1997	4:30 p.m.	vs. No. 2 Arizona State*	No. 4	Rose Bowl; Pasadena, CA (Rose Bowl)	ABC	W 20–17	100,635
*Non-conference game; Rankings from AP Poll released prior to the game; All times are in Eastern time; Source:

== Rankings ==
Ranking movements Legend: ██ Increase in ranking ██ Decrease in ranking ( ) = First-place votes
	Week																	
Poll	Pre	1	2	3	4	5	6	7	8	9	10	11	12	13	14	15	16	Final
AP	9	9	10	8	7	4	3 (1)	2 (24)	2 (7)	2 (4)	2 (4)	2 (5)	2 (17)	2 (7)	6	5	4	2 (1½)
Coaches Poll	10	10	9	7	6	4 (2)	3 (5)	2 (20)	3 (2)	3 (1)	3 (4)	3 (4)	2 (16)	2 (9)	6	5	4	2 (4)

== Game summaries ==
=== Rice ===
Team	1	2	3	4	Total
Rice	0	7	0	0	7
• Ohio St	21	21	21	7	70

- Date: September 7
- Location: Ohio Stadium
- Game attendance: 93,479
- Television network: ESPN+

Scoring summary
1	OHST	Lumpkin 2 yard pass from S Jackson (Jo Jackson kick)	Ohio St 7–0
1	OHST	Pearson 8 yard run (Jo Jackson kick)	Ohio St 14–0
1	OHST	Pearson 22 yard run (Jo Jackson kick)	Ohio St 21–0
2	OHST	Stanley 15 yard pass from Germaine (Jo Jackson kick)	Ohio St 28–0
2	RICE	Perry 5 yard run (Ruff kick)	Ohio St 28–7
2	OHST	Boston 58 yard pass from S Jackson (Jo Jackson kick)	Ohio St 35–7
2	OHST	Wiley 49 yard run (Jo Jackson kick)	Ohio St 42–7
3	OHST	Pearson 25 yard run (Jo Jackson kick)	Ohio St 49–7
3	OHST	Wiley 51 yard pass from Germaine (Jo Jackson kick)	Ohio St 56–7
3	OHST	Wiley 60 yard pass from Germaine (Stamp kick)	Ohio St 63–7
4	OHST	Je Jackson 3 yard run (Stamp kick)	Ohio St 70–7

=== Pittsburgh ===
Team	1	2	3	4	Total
Pittsburgh	0	0	0	0	0
• Ohio St	21	31	13	7	72

- Date: September 21
- Location: Ohio Stadium

=== Notre Dame ===
Team	1	2	3	4	Total
• Ohio St	12	10	7	0	29
Notre Dame	7	0	3	6	16

- Date: September 28
- Location: Notre Dame Stadium

=== Penn State ===
Team	1	2	3	4	Total
Penn St	0	0	0	7	7
• Ohio St	10	14	7	7	38

- Date: October 5
- Location: Ohio Stadium

=== Wisconsin ===
Team	1	2	3	4	Total
Wisconsin	0	7	0	7	14
• Ohio St	0	3	7	7	17

- Date: October 12
- Location: Ohio Stadium

=== Purdue ===
Team	1	2	3	4	Total
• Ohio St	7	7	14	14	42
Purdue	14	0	0	0	14

- Date: October 19
- Location: Ross–Ade Stadium

=== Iowa ===
Team	1	2	3	4	Total
• Ohio St	17	14	7	0	38
Iowa	3	3	6	14	26

- Date: October 26
- Location: Kinnick Stadium

=== Minnesota ===
Team	1	2	3	4	Total
Minnesota	0	0	0	0	0
• Ohio St	0	10	21	14	45

- Date: November 2
- Location: Ohio Stadium

=== Illinois ===
Team	1	2	3	4	Total
• Ohio St	0	28	20	0	48
Illinois	0	0	0	0	0

- Date: November 9
- Location: Memorial Stadium

=== Indiana ===
Team	1	2	3	4	Total
• Ohio St	0	7	0	20	27
Indiana	0	3	7	7	17

- Date: November 16
- Location: Memorial Stadium

=== Michigan ===
Team	1	2	3	4	Total
• Michigan	0	0	10	3	13
Ohio St	3	6	0	0	9

- Date: November 23
- Location: Ohio Stadium

=== Rose Bowl ===
Team	1	2	3	4	Total
• Ohio St	7	0	7	6	20
Arizona St	0	7	3	7	17

- Date: January 1
- Location: Rose Bowl

Ohio State went into the Rose Bowl with high hopes, and Germaine came off the bench and threw a late touchdown pass to David Boston to steal a come-from-behind victory. With the Buckeyes dramatic upset victory over the Sun Devils, Buckeye fans hoped for a share of the national title. However, Florida later avenged a late season loss to their rivals, and beat the Seminoles by a score of 52–20. Florida finished first and Ohio State second in both polls, followed by Florida State and Arizona State. The Rose Bowl appearance was the Buckeyes first since 1985. The Rose Bowl victory was the sixth in school history, the first since 1974. Germaine was named Rose Bowl MVP.

== Personnel ==
=== Roster ===
1996 Ohio State Buckeyes football team roster
Players
Coaches
Offense

Pos.	#	Name	Class
WR	9	David Boston	So
G	57	LeShun Daniels	Sr
WR	82	Mike Furrey	Fr
QB	7	Joe Germaine	So
WR	15	Dee Miller	So
RB	33	Joe Montgomery	So
G	56	Rob Murphy	Fr
OT	75	Orlando Pace	Jr
WR	6	Jimmy Redmond	Fr
WR	3	Dimitrious Stanley	Sr
C	77	Tyson Walter	Fr
RB	5	Michael Wiley	Fr

Defense

Pos.	#	Name	Class
LB	30	Greg Bellisari	Sr
S	1	Gary Berry	Fr
DT	73	Joe Brown	Fr
LB	32	Na'il Diggs	Fr
DT	99	Luke Fickell	Sr
DT	68	Winfield Garrett	Jr
CB	2	Ty Howard	Sr
LB	45	Andy Katzenmoyer	Fr
S	34	Rob Kelly	Sr
CB	20	Central McClellion	So
LB	43	Ryan Miller	Sr
SS	13	Damon Moore	So
CB	19	Ahmed Plummer	Fr
CB	24	Shawn Springs	Jr
LB	94	Mike Vrabel	Sr
CB	11	Antoine Winfield	So

Special teams

Pos.	#	Name	Class
P	41	Brent Bartholomew	So
LS	87	Kevin Houser	Fr

Head coach

- John Cooper

Coordinators/assistant coaches

Legend

- (C) Team captain
- (S) Suspended
- (I) Ineligible
- Injured
- Redshirt

Roster

=== Coaching staff ===
- John Cooper, head coach (9th year)
- Bill Conley, defensive ends, recruiting coordinator (10th year)
- Walt Harris, quarterbacks (2nd year)
- Jim Heacock, defensive line (1st year)
- Joe Hollis, offensive coordinator (6th year)
- Mike Jacobs, offensive line (2nd year)
- Fred Pagac, defensive coordinator, linebackers (15th year)
- Tim Spencer, running backs (3rd year)
- Chuck Stobart, wide receivers (2nd year)
- Jon Tenuta, defensive backs (1st year)

=== Depth chart ===
Defense

FS
34 Rob Kelly
26 Anthony Gwinn

WLB	MLB	SLB
43 Ryan Miller	45 Andy Katzenmoyer	30 Greg Bellisari
35 Jerry Rudzinski	51 Roedell Dupree	52 Kevin Johnson

SS
13 Damon Moore
18 Che Bryant

CB
2 Ty Howard
⋅

DE	DT	DT	DE
94 Mike Vrabel	99 Luke Fickell	68 Winfield Garnett	92 Matt Finkes
⋅	62 Shane Clark	97 John Day	⋅

CB
24 Shawn Springs
11 Antoine Winfield

Offense

SE
9 David Boston
12 Buster Tillman

LT	LG	C	RG	RT
75 Orlando Pace	56 Rob Murphy	65 Juan Porter	57 LeShun Daniels	50 Eric Gohlstin
⋅	⋅	⋅	⋅	⋅

TE
85 John Lumpkin
⋅

FL
3 Dimitrious Stanley
15 Dee Miller

QB
8 Stanley Jackson
7 Joe Germaine

Key reserves
23 Matt Keller (FB)

FB
37 Nicky Sualua
39 Matt Calhoun

Special teams
PK 4 Josh Jackson
P 41 Brent Bartholomew

RB
29 Pepe Pearson
25 Jermon Jackson

== Awards and honors ==
- Andy Katzenmoyer, Big Ten Freshman of the Year

== 1997 NFL draftees ==
Player	Round	Pick	Position	NFL club
Orlando Pace	1	1	Tackle	St. Louis Rams
Shawn Springs	1	3	Defensive back	Seattle Seahawks
Rob Kelly	2	33	Defensive back	New Orleans Saints
Ty Howard	3	84	Defensive back	Arizona Cardinals
Mike Vrabel	3	91	Defensive end	Pittsburgh Steelers
Nicky Sualua	4	129	Running back	Dallas Cowboys
Matt Finkes	6	189	Defensive end	Carolina Panthers
