= List of Minnesota Golden Gophers bowl games =

The Minnesota Golden Gophers football team competes as part of the NCAA Division I Football Bowl Subdivision (FBS), representing the University of Minnesota in the West Division of the Big Ten Conference. Since the establishment of the team in 1882, Minnesota has appeared in 26 bowl games. Included in these games are 2 appearances in the Rose Bowl. The latest bowl appearance for Minnesota came in their win against New Mexico in the 2025 Rate Bowl. A win in that game brought Minnesota's all-time bowl record to 14 wins and 12 losses (14–12).

== Bowl games ==
List of bowl games showing bowl played in, score, date, season, opponent, stadium, location, attendance and head coach
| # | Bowl | Score | Date | Season | Opponent | Stadium | Location | Attendance | Head coach |
|---|---|---|---|---|---|---|---|---|---|
| 1 | Rose Bowl | L 7–17 | January 2, 1961 | 1960 | Washington | Rose Bowl | Pasadena, California | 97,314 | Murray Warmath |
| 2 | Rose Bowl | W 21–3 | January 1, 1962 | 1961 | UCLA | Rose Bowl | Pasadena, California | 98,214 | Murray Warmath |
| 3 | Hall of Fame Classic | L 7–17 | December 22, 1977 | 1977 | Maryland | Legion Field | Birmingham, Alabama | 47,000 | Cal Stoll |
| 4 | Independence Bowl | W 20–13 | December 21, 1985 | 1985 | Clemson | Independence Stadium | Shreveport, Louisiana | 42,800 | John Gutekunst |
| 5 | Liberty Bowl | L 14–21 | December 29, 1986 | 1986 | Tennessee | Liberty Bowl Memorial Stadium | Memphis, Tennessee | 51,327 | John Gutekunst |
| 6 | Sun Bowl | L 20–24 | December 31, 1999 | 1999 | Oregon | Sun Bowl Stadium | El Paso, Texas | 48,757 | Glen Mason |
| 7 | MicronPC.com Bowl | L 30–38 | December 28, 2000 | 2000 | NC State | Pro Player Stadium | Miami Gardens, Florida | 28,359 | Glen Mason |
| 8 | Music City Bowl | W 29–14 | December 30, 2002 | 2002 | Arkansas | The Coliseum | Nashville, Tennessee | 39,183 | Glen Mason |
| 9 | Sun Bowl | W 31–30 | December 31, 2003 | 2003 | Oregon | Sun Bowl Stadium | El Paso, Texas | 49,894 | Glen Mason |
| 10 | Music City Bowl | W 20–16 | December 31, 2004 | 2004 | Alabama | The Coliseum | Nashville, Tennessee | 66,089 | Glen Mason |
| 11 | Music City Bowl | L 31–34 | December 30, 2005 | 2005 | Virginia | The Coliseum | Nashville, Tennessee | 40,519 | Glen Mason |
| 12 | Insight Bowl | L 41–44 | December 29, 2006 | 2006 | Texas Tech | Sun Devil Stadium | Tempe, Arizona | 48,391 | Glen Mason |
| 13 | Insight Bowl | L 21–42 | December 31, 2008 | 2008 | Kansas | Sun Devil Stadium | Tempe, Arizona | 49,103 | Tim Brewster |
| 14 | Insight Bowl | L 13–14 | December 31, 2009 | 2009 | Iowa State | Sun Devil Stadium | Tempe, Arizona | 45,090 | Tim Brewster |
| 15 | Meineke Car Care Bowl of Texas | L 31–34 | December 28, 2012 | 2012 | Texas Tech | Reliant Stadium | Houston, Texas | 50,386 | Jerry Kill |
| 16 | Texas Bowl | L 17–21 | December 27, 2013 | 2013 | Syracuse | Reliant Stadium | Houston, Texas | 32,327 | Jerry Kill |
| 17 | Citrus Bowl | L 17–33 | January 1, 2015 | 2014 | Missouri | Orlando Citrus Bowl Stadium | Orlando, Florida | 48,624 | Jerry Kill |
| 18 | Quick Lane Bowl | W 21–14 | December 28, 2015 | 2015 | Central Michigan | Ford Field | Detroit, Michigan | 34,217 | Tracy Claeys (interim) |
| 19 | Holiday Bowl | W 17–12 | December 27, 2016 | 2016 | Washington State | Qualcomm Stadium | San Diego, California | 48,704 | Tracy Claeys |
| 20 | Quick Lane Bowl | W 34–10 | December 26, 2018 | 2018 | Georgia Tech | Ford Field | Detroit, Michigan | 27,228 | P. J. Fleck |
| 21 | Outback Bowl | W 31–24 | January 1, 2020 | 2019 | Auburn | Raymond James Stadium | Tampa, Florida | 45,652 | P. J. Fleck |
| 22 | Guaranteed Rate Bowl | W 18–6 | December 28, 2021 | 2021 | West Virginia | Chase Field | Phoenix, Arizona | 21,220 | P. J. Fleck |
| 23 | Pinstripe Bowl | W 28–20 | December 29, 2022 | 2022 | Syracuse | Yankee Stadium | Bronx, New York | 31,131 | P. J. Fleck |
| 24 | Quick Lane Bowl | W 30–24 | December 26, 2023 | 2023 | Bowling Green | Ford Field | Detroit, Michigan | 28,521 | P. J. Fleck |
| 25 | Duke's Mayo Bowl | W 24–10 | January 3, 2025 | 2024 | Virginia Tech | Bank of America Stadium | Charlotte, North Carolina | 31,927 | P. J. Fleck |
| 26 | Rate Bowl | W 20–17^{OT} | December 26, 2025 | 2025 | New Mexico | Chase Field | Phoenix, Arizona | 27,439 | P. J. Fleck |
