= List of Minnesota Golden Gophers football seasons =

The Minnesota Golden Gophers college football team competes as part of the National Collegiate Athletic Association (NCAA) Division I Football Bowl Subdivision, representing the University of Minnesota in the West Division of the Big Ten Conference.Minnesota was one of seven original founding members of the Big Ten Conference, then known as the Western Conference, in 1896. The Big Ten Conference introduced divisional play in 2011; the divisional winners advance to the Big Ten Championship Game to determine the conference champion.

Since the team's first season in 1882, the Gophers have participated in more than 1,250 officially sanctioned games, including 20 bowl games, and have finished in the top 25 of the national polls 16 times. Minnesota claims seven national championships, most recently a consensus national championship in 1960, and has won at least a share of the conference championship 18 times, most recently in 1967.

== Seasons ==
Year	Coach	Overall	Conference	Standing	Bowl/playoffs	Coaches^{#}	AP^{°}
Independent (1882)
1882	No coach	1–1					
Thomas Peebles (Independent) (1883)
1883	Thomas Peebles	1–2					
1884	No team						
1885	No team						
Frederick S. Jones (Independent) (1886–1888)
1886	Frederick S. Jones	0–2					
1887	Frederick S. Jones	2–0					
1888	Frederick S. Jones	1–1					
Al McCord, D. W. McCord, Frank Heffelfinger, Billy Morse (Independent) (1889)
1889	Multiple coaches (Note: After Frederick S. Jones stopped actively coaching, the team used game coaches for one season instead of finding a replacement for him)	3–1					
Tom Eck (Independent) (1890)
1890	Tom Eck	5–1–1					
Edward Moulton (Independent) (1891)
1891	Edward Moulton	3–1–1					
Intercollegiate Athletic Association of the Northwest (1892)
1892	No coach	4–1	3–0	1st			
Wallace Winter (IAANW) (1893)
1893	Wallace Winter	6–0	3–0	1st			
Thomas Cochran (Independent) (1894)
1894	Thomas Cochran	3–1					
Pudge Heffelfinger (Independent) (1895)
1895	Pudge Heffelfinger	7–3					
Alexander Jerrems (Western Conference) (1896–1897)
1896	Alexander Jerrems	8–2	1–2	5th			
1897	Alexander Jerrems	4–4	0–3	7th			
John Minds (Western Conference) (1898)
1898	John Minds	4–5	1–2	5th			
Jack Harrison & William C. Leary (Western Conference) (1899)
1899	Harrison & Leary	6–3–2	0–3	T–6th			
Henry L. Williams (Western Conference) (1900–1921)
1900	Henry L. Williams	10–0–2	3–0–1	T–1st			
1901	Henry L. Williams	9–1–1	3–1	3rd			
1902	Henry L. Williams	9–2–1	3–1	3rd			
1903	Henry L. Williams	14–0–1	3–0–1	T–1st			
1904	Henry L. Williams	13–0	3–0	T–1st			
1905	Henry L. Williams	10–1	2–1	T–2nd			
1906	Henry L. Williams	4–1	2–0	T–1st			
1907	Henry L. Williams	2–2–1	0–1–1	5th			
1908	Henry L. Williams	3–2–1	0–2	T–6th			
1909	Henry L. Williams	6–1	3–0	1st			
1910	Henry L. Williams	6–1	2–0	T–1st			
1911	Henry L. Williams	6–0–1	3–0–1	1st			
1912	Henry L. Williams	4–3	2–2	T–3rd			
1913	Henry L. Williams	5–2	2–1	T–2nd			
1914	Henry L. Williams	6–1	3–1	2nd			
1915	Henry L. Williams	6–0–1	3–0–1	T–1st			
1916	Henry L. Williams	6–1	3–1	3rd			
1917	Henry L. Williams	4–1	3–1	2nd			
1918	Henry L. Williams	5–2–1	2–1	T–4th			
1919	Henry L. Williams	4–2–1	3–2	T–4th			
1920	Henry L. Williams	1–6	0–6	T–9th			
1921	Henry L. Williams	3–4	2–4	T–6th			
William H. Spaulding (Big Ten Conference) (1922–1924)
1922	William H. Spaulding	3–3–1	2–3–1	5th			
1923	William H. Spaulding	5–1–1	2–1–1	4th			
1924	William H. Spaulding	3–3–2	1–2–1	6th			
Clarence Spears (Big Ten Conference) (1925–1929)
1925	Clarence Spears	5–2–1	1–1–1	T–4th			
1926	Clarence Spears	5–3	2–2	T–6th			
1927	Clarence Spears	6–0–2	3–0–1	T–1st			
1928	Clarence Spears	6–2	4–2	3rd			
1929	Clarence Spears	6–2	3–2	T–3rd			
Fritz Crisler (Big Ten Conference) (1930–1931)
1930	Fritz Crisler	3–4–1	1–3	T–6th			
1931	Fritz Crisler	7–3	3–2	5th			
Bernie Bierman (Big Ten Conference) (1932–1941)
1932	Bernie Bierman	5–3	2–3	6th			
1933	Bernie Bierman	4–0–4	2–0–4	T–1st			
1934	Bernie Bierman	8–0	5–0	T–1st			
1935	Bernie Bierman	8–0	5–0	T–1st			
1936	Bernie Bierman	7–1	4–1	T–2nd			1
1937	Bernie Bierman	6–2	5–0	1st			5
1938	Bernie Bierman	6–2	4–1	1st			10
1939	Bernie Bierman	3–4–1	2–3–1	7th			
1940	Bernie Bierman	8–0	6–0	1st			1
1941	Bernie Bierman	8–0	5–0	1st			1
George Hauser (Big Ten Conference) (1942–1944)
1942	George Hauser	5–4	3–3	T–5th			19
1943	George Hauser	5–4	2–3	5th			
1944	George Hauser	5–3–1	3–2–1	4th			
Bernie Bierman (Big Ten Conference) (1945–1950)
1945	Bernie Bierman	4–5	1–5	T–8th			
1946	Bernie Bierman	5–4	3–4	5th			
1947	Bernie Bierman	6–3	3–3	T–3rd			
1948	Bernie Bierman	7–2	5–2	3rd			16
1949	Bernie Bierman	7–2	4–2	3rd			8
1950	Bernie Bierman	1–7–1	1–4–1	7th			
Wes Fesler (Big Ten Conference) (1951–1953)
1951	Wes Fesler	2–6–1	1–4–1	7th			
1952	Wes Fesler	4–3–2	3–1–2	T–4th			
1953	Wes Fesler	4–4–1	3–3–1	T–5th			
Murray Warmath (Big Ten Conference) (1954–1971)
1954	Murray Warmath	7–2	4–2	4th		20	
1955	Murray Warmath	3–6	2–5	8th			
1956	Murray Warmath	6–1–2	4–1–2	T–2nd		9	12
1957	Murray Warmath	4–5	3–5	8th			
1958	Murray Warmath	1–8	1–6	9th			
1959	Murray Warmath	2–7	1–6	10th			
1960	Murray Warmath	8–2	5–1	T–1st	L Rose	1	1
1961	Murray Warmath	8–2	6–1	2nd	W Rose	6	6
1962	Murray Warmath	6–2–1	5–2	2nd		10	10
1963	Murray Warmath	3–6	2–5	9th			
1964	Murray Warmath	5–4	4–3	T–4th			
1965	Murray Warmath	5–4–1	5–2	T–3rd			
1966	Murray Warmath	4–5–1	3–3–1	5th			
1967	Murray Warmath	8–2	6–1	T–1st		14	
1968	Murray Warmath	6–4	5–2	T–3rd		18	
1969	Murray Warmath	4–5–1	4–3	4th			
1970	Murray Warmath	3–6–1	2–4–1	7th			
1971	Murray Warmath	4–7	3–5	T–6th			
Cal Stoll (Big Ten Conference) (1972–1978)
1972	Cal Stoll	4–7	4–4	5th			
1973	Cal Stoll	7–4	6–2	3rd			
1974	Cal Stoll	4–7	2–6	T–7th			
1975	Cal Stoll	6–5	3–5	T–7th			
1976	Cal Stoll	6–5	4–4	T–3rd			
1977	Cal Stoll	7–5	4–4	5th	L Hall of Fame Classic		
1978	Cal Stoll	5–6	4–4	5th			
Joe Salem (Big Ten Conference) (1979–1983)
1979	Joe Salem	4–6–1	3–5–1	6th			
1980	Joe Salem	5–6	4–5	5th			
1981	Joe Salem	6–5	4–5	T–6th			
1982	Joe Salem	3–8	1–8	10th			
1983	Joe Salem	1–10	0–9	10th			
Lou Holtz (Big Ten Conference) (1984–1985)
1984	Lou Holtz	4–7	3–6	8th			
1985	Lou Holtz (Note: Holtz left Minnesota for Notre Dame before the Independence Bowl, which was coached by John Gutekunst.)	7–5	4–4	6th	W Independence		
John Gutekunst (Big Ten Conference) (1985–1991)
1986	John Gutekunst	6–6	5–3	T–3rd	L Liberty		
1987	John Gutekunst	6–5	3–5	T–6th			
1988	John Gutekunst	2–7–2	0–6–2	T–9th			
1989	John Gutekunst	6–5	4–4	5th			
1990	John Gutekunst	6–5	5–3	6th			
1991	John Gutekunst	2–9	1–7	10th			
Jim Wacker (Big Ten Conference) (1992–1996)
1992	Jim Wacker	2–9	2–6	10th			
1993	Jim Wacker	4–7	3–5	T–8th			
1994	Jim Wacker	3–8	1–7	11th			
1995	Jim Wacker	3–8	1–7	10th			
1996	Jim Wacker	4–7	1–7	T–9th			
Glen Mason (Big Ten Conference) (1997–2006)
1997	Glen Mason	3–9	1–7	T–9th			
1998	Glen Mason	5–6	2–6	T–7th			
1999	Glen Mason	8–4	5–3	T–4th	L Sun	17	18
2000	Glen Mason	6–6	4–4	T–5th	L MicronPC.com		
2001	Glen Mason	4–7	2–6	T–10th			
2002	Glen Mason	8–5	3–5	7th	W Music City		
2003	Glen Mason	10–3	5–3	T–4th	W Sun	17	20
2004	Glen Mason	7–5	3–5	8th	W Music City		
2005	Glen Mason	7–5	4–4	7th	L Music City		
2006	Glen Mason	6–7	3–5	T–6th	L Insight		
Tim Brewster (Big Ten Conference) (2007–2010)
2007	Tim Brewster	1–11	0–8	11th			
2008	Tim Brewster	7–6	3–5	T–6th	L Insight		
2009	Tim Brewster	6–7	3–5	8th	L Insight		
2010	Tim Brewster (Note: They were led by fourth-year head coach Tim Brewster until his firing on October 17, 2010, the result of 1–6 start. Co-offensive coordinator Jeff Horton was tapped as interim head coach for the remainder of the season.)	3–9	2–6	T–9th			
Jerry Kill (Big Ten Conference) (2011–2015)
2011	Jerry Kill	3–9	2–6	6th (Legends)			
2012	Jerry Kill	6–7	2–6	T–5th (Legends)	L Texas		
2013	Jerry Kill (Note: Took a two–game leave of absence for epilepsy treatment during the 2013 season, but all games are credited to his record. Tracy Claeys served as the interim head coach.)	8–5	4–4	4th (Legends)	L Texas		
2014	Jerry Kill	8–5	5–3	T–2nd (West)	L Citrus		
2015	Jerry Kill (Note: Jerry Kill was head coach for the first seven games of the season. Tracy Claeys was named interim head coach after Kill retired for health reasons on October 28, and had the "interim" tag removed on November 15. Minnesota credits the first seven games to Kill and the final five games to Claeys.)	6–7	2–6	T–5th (West)	W Quick Lane		
Tracy Claeys (Big Ten Conference) (2015–2016)
2016	Tracy Claeys	9–4	5–4	T–4th (West)	W Holiday		
P. J. Fleck (Big Ten Conference) (2017–present)
2017	P. J. Fleck	5–7	2–7	6th (West)			
2018	P. J. Fleck	7–6	3–6	T–5th (West)	W Quick Lane		
2019	P. J. Fleck	11–2	7–2	T–1st (West)	W Outback	10	10
2020	P. J. Fleck	3–4	3–4	4th (West)			
2021	P. J. Fleck	9–4	6–3	T–2nd (West)	W Guaranteed Rate		
2022	P. J. Fleck	9–4	5–4	T–2nd (West)	W Pinstripe		
2023	P. J. Fleck	6–7	3–6	T–4th (West)	W Quick Lane		
2024	P. J. Fleck	8–5	5–4	T–7th	W Duke's Mayo		
2025	P. J. Fleck	8–5	5–4	T–7th	W Rate		
Total:		738–544–44					
National championship Conference title Conference division title or championship game berth
^{†}Indicates Bowl Coalition, Bowl Alliance, BCS, or CFP / New Years' Six bowl.; ^{#}Rankings from final Coaches Poll.
