= Minnesota Golden Gophers football =

American football team

2026 Minnesota Golden Gophers football team
- First season: 1882; 144 years ago
- Athletic director: Mark Coyle
- Head coach: P. J. Fleck; 10th season, 67–44 (.604)
- Location: Minneapolis, Minnesota
- Stadium: Huntington Bank Stadium (capacity: 50,805)
- NCAA division: Division I FBS
- Conference: Big Ten
- Colors: Maroon and gold
- All-time record: 738–539–44 (.575)
- Bowl record: 14–12 (.538)

National championships
- Claimed: 1904, 1934, 1935, 1936, 1940, 1941, 1960
- Unclaimed: 1911, 1915

Conference championships
- IAAN: 1892, 1893 Big Ten: 1900, 1903, 1904, 1906, 1909, 1910, 1911, 1915, 1927, 1933, 1934, 1935, 1937, 1938, 1940, 1941, 1960, 1967

Division championships
- Big Ten West: 2019
- Heisman winners: Bruce Smith – 1941
- Consensus All-Americans: 34
- Rivalries: Wisconsin (rivalry); Iowa (rivalry); Nebraska (rivalry); Michigan (trophy); Penn State (trophy)

Uniforms
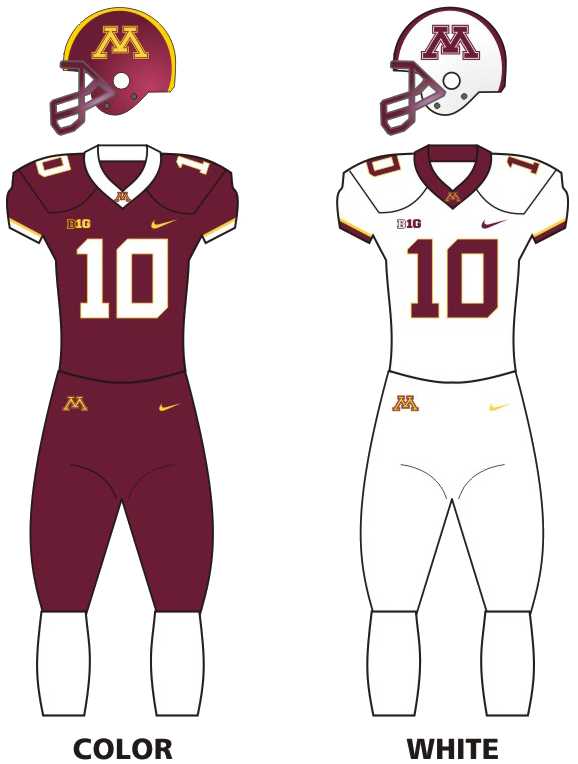
- Fight song: Minnesota Rouser
- Mascot: Goldy Gopher
- Marching band: Minnesota Marching Band
- Outfitter: Nike
- Website: gophersports.com

The Minnesota Golden Gophers football team represents the University of Minnesota in college football at the NCAA Division I Football Bowl Subdivision level. Founded in 1882, Minnesota has been a member of the Big Ten Conference since its inception in 1896 as the Western Conference. The Golden Gophers claim seven national championships, including four (1936, 1940, 1941, and 1960) from the major wire-services: AP Poll and/or Coaches' Poll.

Since 2009, the Golden Gophers have played all their home games at Huntington Bank Stadium in Minneapolis, Minnesota. The team is currently coached by P. J. Fleck.

== History ==
The Minnesota Gophers college football team played its first game on September 29, 1882, a 4–0 victory over Hamline University. Eight years later in 1890, the Gophers played host to Wisconsin in a 63–0 victory. With the exception of 1906, the Gophers and Badgers have played each other every year since then. The 132 games played against each other is the most played rivalry in Division I-A college football.

=== Early years ===
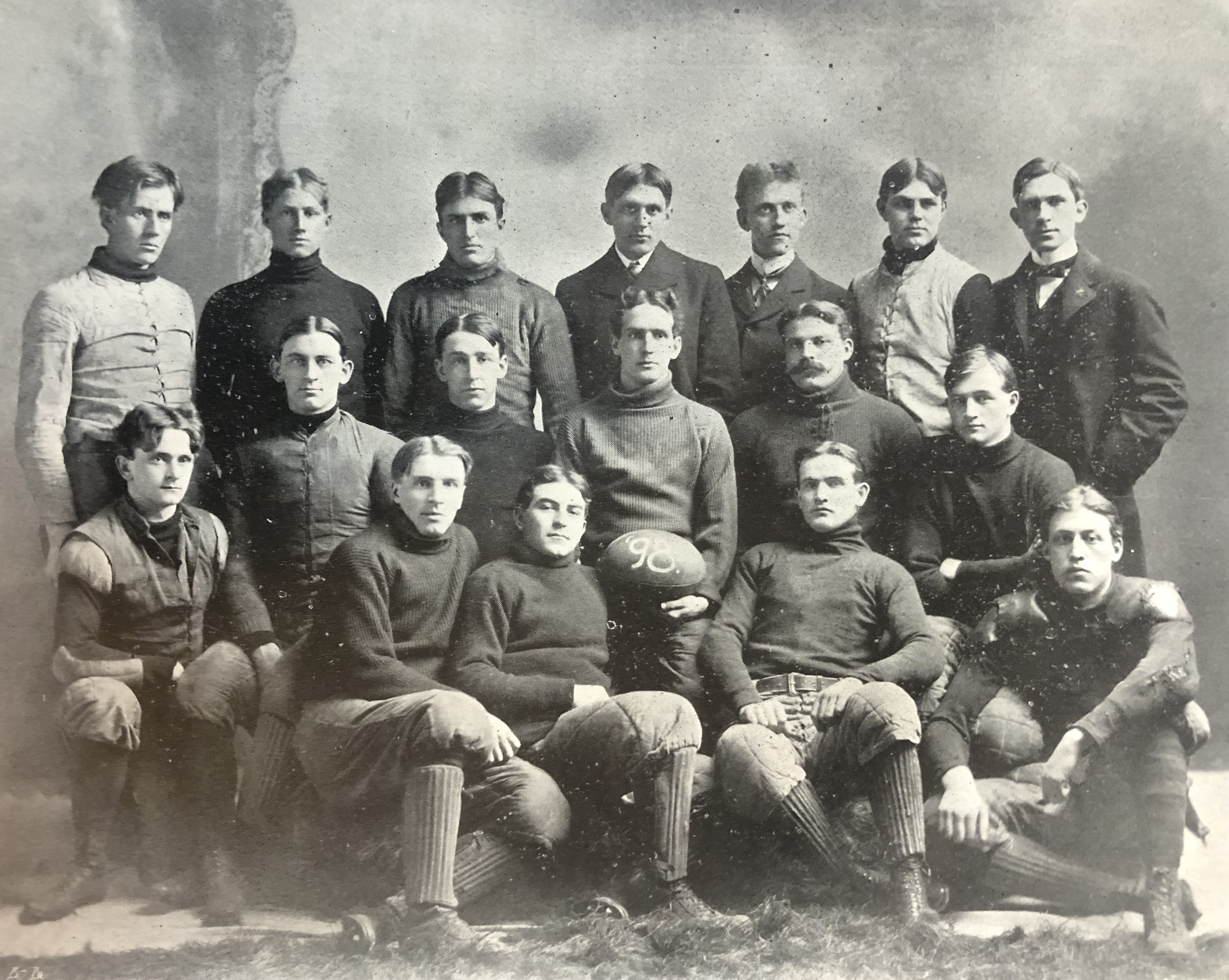
Minnesota football team of 1898

The sport's beginnings were humble. Students began gathering to play the game recreationally and its popularity grew.

Once the sport had taken off, it was only a matter of time before a team was formed to play against other schools. Early teams were very loosely organized, not requiring all of the players to be students and not having designated coaches. The players on the team started to recruit faculty members who had played football at schools in the East to help organize the team. The team gained their first coach in 1883: Thomas Peebles, a philosophy professor who also recruited a cheer team for the football players, which later established him as the father of American cheerleading. Like many of the early coaches, his term lasted just one year.

Some years, the football team played without a coach. Other years, they played with multiple coaches. In total, from 1882 through 1899, the team played 16 seasons of football and had 15 different coaches. As the years went by, the leadership structure started to become more formal. In 1900, the hiring of Dr. Henry L. Williams, the school's first full-time salaried coach, signaled the end of the early, chaotic days.

=== Glory years ===
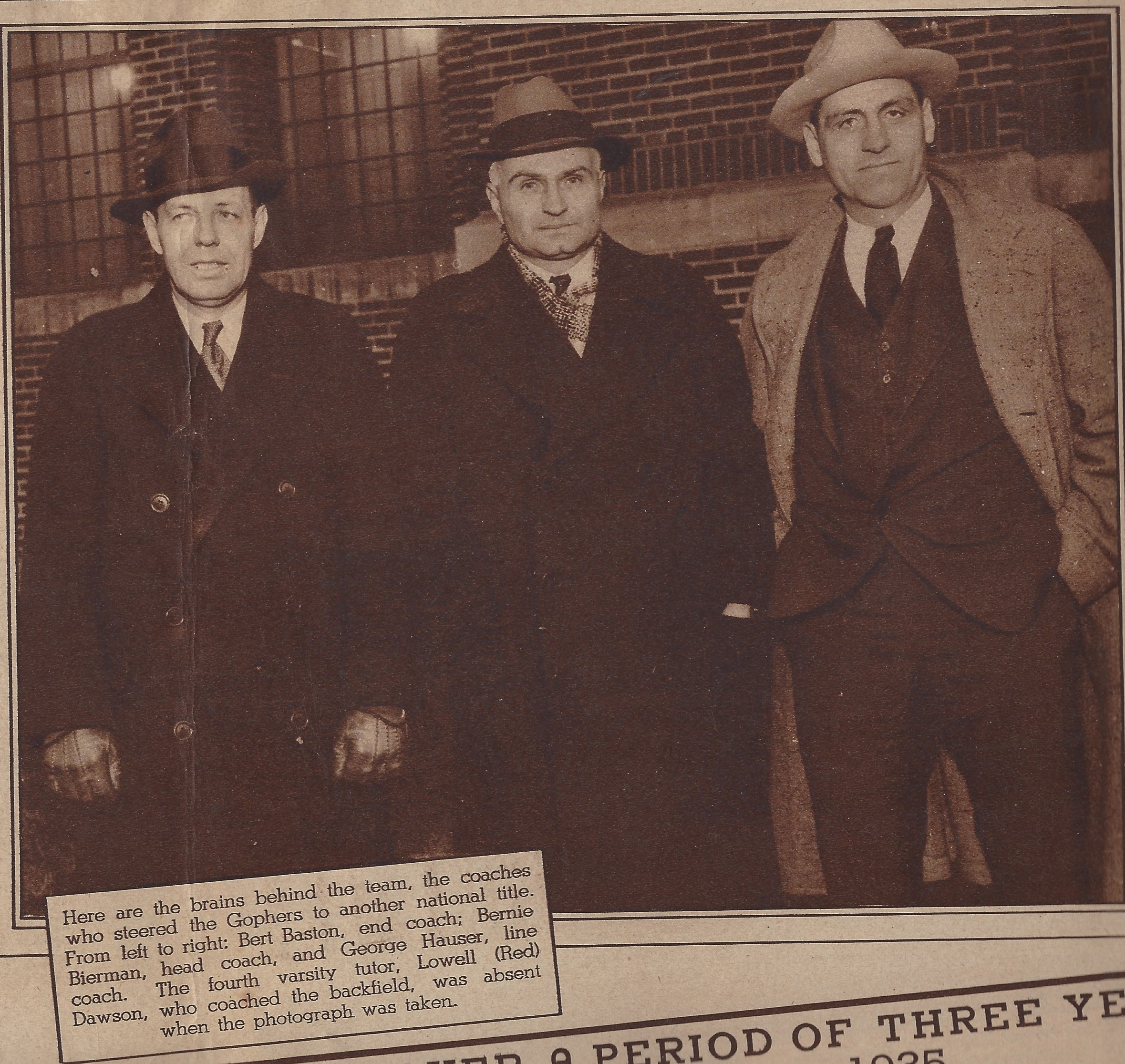
The Minnesota's Golden Gophers, 1935 National Champions, coaches: Bert Baston, end coach; Bernie Bierman, head coach; and George Hauser, line coach. The fourth varsity tutor, Lowek (Red) Dawson, who coached the backfield, was absent when the photograph was taken

The Gophers enjoyed quite a bit of success in the early 20th century, posting winning records from 1900 to 1919. Head coach Henry L. Williams developed the "Minnesota shift", a predecessor to later quick line shifts, which was adopted widely. Also Henry L. Williams led Minnesota to one of the NCAA's longest unbeaten streaks of 35 games, from 1903 to 1905 with 34 wins and 1 tie. In 1932, Bernie Bierman became the Gophers' head coach and led the Gophers to their first dynasty. From 1934 to 1936 the Gophers went on a run of winning three straight National Championships, the last Division I team to accomplish this feat. During the run, Minnesota went unbeaten in 28 straight games, 21 of which were consecutive victories. The school record for consecutive victories is 24, which spanned 3 seasons from 1903 to 1905. Led by halfback Bruce Smith, the Gophers also won two more national championships in 1940 and 1941, with Smith winning the Heisman Trophy in 1941. Those two seasons comprised most of an 18-game winning streak that stretched from 1939 to 1942.

=== Fall from power ===
In the seasons immediately following the end of World War II, Bernie Bierman did not adopt the 2 most important innovations in on-field strategy: substituting the 60-minute player for two-platoon of offensive-only and defensive-only players, and the split-T offensive formation. Instead, Bierman continued to use two-way players and the single-wing formation.

Off the field, Bierman had to contend with the most conservative administration in the Big Ten. President James Morrill's public and private advocacy for the less-professional rules of the pre-World War II era led Minnesota to become the only Big Ten school to vote against the 3 most consequential conference decisions in the immediate post-war years: the legalization of athletic scholarships in 1949, and the 1946 and 1950 Rose Bowl deals.

=== Return to prominence ===
After some mediocre seasons throughout the remainder of the 1940s and 1950s, the Gophers rose back to prominence in 1960 with their seventh national championship (because polling ended after the regular season, the Gophers were crowned AP and UPI national champions despite losing the Rose Bowl to Washington). That national championship followed a 1–8 record in 1958 and 2–7 record in 1959. Minnesota played in bowl games the two following years as well, in 1961 and 1962. The Gophers earned their first berth in the Rose Bowl by winning the 1960 Big Ten title. The following year, Minnesota returned to Pasadena despite a second-place finish in the conference. The Ohio State Buckeyes, the Big Ten champions in 1961, declined an invitation to the Rose Bowl because of tension between academics and athletics at the school. Minnesota beat UCLA 21–3 to claim its first and only Rose Bowl victory. Minnesota's last Big Ten title was in 1967, tying the Indiana Hoosiers and Purdue Boilermakers atop the standings.

=== Recent history ===
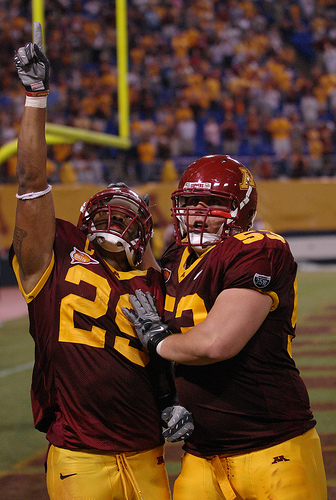
Amir Pinnix celebrates a touchdown with D.J. Burris on September 1, 2007

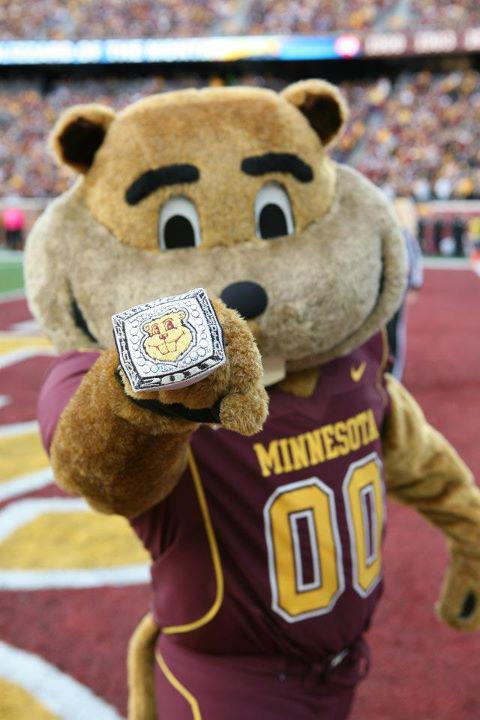
Goldy showing off his ring at a Gophers Football Game

After their 8–2 record in 1967, the Gophers did not win 8 games in a season again until they finished 8–4 in 1999. Their 10–3 record in 2003 gave the Gophers their first 10 win season since 1905.

The 2006 team had the dubious distinction of blowing a 38–7 third-quarter lead in the Insight Bowl against Texas Tech, losing 44–41 in overtime. The collapse, which was the biggest in the history of Division I-A postseason football, directly led to the firing of head coach Glen Mason. On January 17, 2007, Tim Brewster was officially announced as the next head coach of the Minnesota Golden Gophers.

In 1981, the Gophers played their last game in Memorial Stadium and played their home games in the Hubert H. Humphrey Metrodome until 2008. The Gophers moved back to campus with a 20–13 win against Air Force on September 12, 2009, when their new home, TCF Bank Stadium, opened.

In 2010, after a 1–6 record to start the season, the Gophers football head coach Tim Brewster was fired. Jeff Horton served as the interim head coach going 2–3. On December 6, 2010, Jerry Kill, former Northern Illinois University head coach, was hired to take over the University of Minnesota football program.

In 2014, The Gophers reached an 8–4 record while going 5–3 in Big Ten games, falling just short of making the Big Ten Championship Game by losing to The Wisconsin Badgers in the season finale. After being revitalized in the Big Ten contention, The Gophers were awarded an appearance in the Citrus Bowl on January 1 against Missouri.

In 2017, former Western Michigan Broncos coach P. J. Fleck was hired to take over from Tracy Claeys, who coached the Gophers from 2015 to 2016. Fleck led the Broncos to a 13–1 season in 2016 that resulted in a Cotton Bowl appearance against Wisconsin

In 2018, the Gophers defeated the Badgers to reclaim Paul Bunyan's Axe and end a 14-season losing streak.

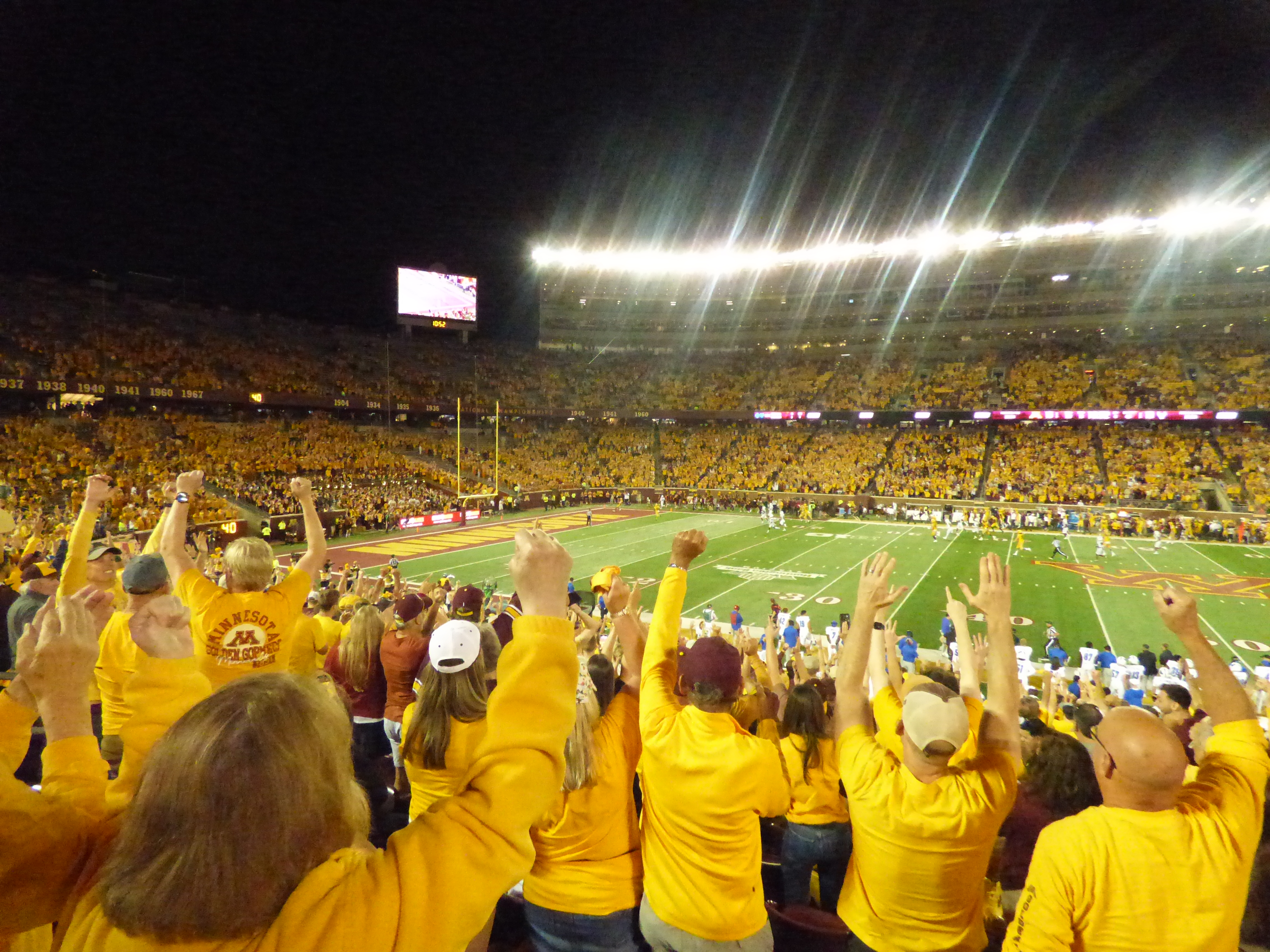
Gophers fans celebrating a touchdown in 2025 against Buffalo.

In 2019, the Gophers turned in a historic season, going 11–2 (7–2 in conference play) including a home victory against No. 4 Penn State 31-26, their first victory over a top 5 team in 20 years. The win also marked the first time since 1904 that the Gophers started out a season 9-0.

== Conference affiliations ==
- Independent (1882–1891)
- Intercollegiate Athletic Association of the Northwest (1892–1893)
- Independent (1894–1895)
- Big Ten Conference (1896–present)
  - Western Conference (1896–1952)
  - Big Ten Conference (1953–present)

=== All-time Big Ten records ===
Team	Won	Lost	Tied	Pct.	Streak	First meeting	Last meeting
Chicago Maroons	12	5	1	.694	Won 7	1895	1934
Illinois Fighting Illini	41	33	3	.552	Won 1	1898	2024
Indiana Hoosiers	40	26	3	.601	Won 4	1906	2021
Iowa Hawkeyes	63	52	2	.547	Lost 1	1891	2024
Maryland Terrapins	4	4	0	.500	Won 2	1977	2024
Michigan Wolverines	25	77	3	.252	Lost 4	1891	2023
Michigan State Spartans	19	30	0	.388	Won 2	1950	2023
Nebraska Cornhuskers	37	25	2	.578	Won 5	1900	2023
Northwestern Wildcats	55	37	5	.597	Lost 1	1892	2023
Ohio State Buckeyes	7	47	0	.130	Lost 12	1921	2023
Penn State Nittany Lions	6	10	0	.375	Lost 1	1993	2022
Purdue Boilermakers	41	35	3	.538	Won 1	1894	2023
Rutgers Scarlet Knights	4	1	0	.800	Won 1	2016	2025
Wisconsin Badgers	64	63	8	.504	Won 2	1890	2025
	406	436	35	.483			

== Championships ==
=== National championships ===
Minnesota has been selected nine times as national champions from NCAA-designated major selectors, including four (1936, 1940, 1941, and 1960) from the major wire-service: AP Poll and/or Coaches' Poll. Minnesota claims seven (1904, 1934, 1935, 1936, 1940, 1941, and 1960) of these championships.

Season	Coach	Selectors	Record	Bowl	Result	Final AP	Final Coaches
1904	Henry L. Williams	Billingsley	13–0			–	–
1934	Bernie Bierman	Billingsley, Boand, Dickinson, Football Research, Helms, Litkenhous, National Championship Foundation, Sagarin, Sagarin (ELO-Chess)	8–0			–	–
1935	Bernie Bierman	Billingsley, Boand, Football Research, Helms, Litkenhous, National Championship Foundation, Poling	8–0			–	–
1936	Bernie Bierman	AP, Billingsley, Dickinson, Dunkel, Helms, Litkenhous, National Championship Foundation, Poling	7–1			No. 1	–
1940	Bernie Bierman	AP, Berryman, Boand, DeVold, Dickinson, Football Research, Houlgate, Litkenhous, National Championship Foundation, Sagarin, Sagarin (ELO-Chess)	8–0			No. 1	–
1941	Bernie Bierman	AP, Billingsley, Boand, DeVold, Dunkel, Football Research, Helms, Litkenhous, National Championship Foundation, Poling, Sagarin, Sagarin (ELO-Chess)	8–0			No. 1	–
1960	Murray Warmath	AP, FB News, NFF, UPI	8–2	Rose	L 7–17	No. 1	No. 1

==== Toledo Cup ====
The Gophers were the inaugural winners of the Toledo Cup national championship trophy in 1934 and repeated the feat in 1935 and 1936. The poll's rules stated the traveling trophy would be retained permanently by the first team to win it three times; Bernie Bierman's teams completed the three-peat without any other team winning the cup. The Toledo Cup is currently displayed in the lobby of the Gibson-Nagurski Athletic Center at the University of Minnesota.

==== Rockne Memorial Trophy ====
Minnesota won Dickinson System national championships in 1934, 1936, and 1940. The three wins gave them permanent possession of the Knute Rockne Memorial Trophy, which had been introduced in 1931. Following tradition, the university set their own new trophy into play and named it for former football coach Henry L. Williams.

With professor Frank Dickinson retiring from the ratings business, the new Williams Trophy was instead linked to the nascent AP Poll and served as the first AP Trophy.

=== Conference championships ===
Minnesota has won 18 conference championships, 11 shared and 7 outright.

Season	Coach	Conference	Overall Record	Conference Record
1892	No coach	Intercollegiate Athletic Association of the Northwest	5–0	3–0
1893	Wallace Winter	Intercollegiate Athletic Association of the Northwest	6–0	3–0
1900†	Henry L. Williams	Western Conference	10–0–2	3–0–1
1903†	Henry L. Williams	Western Conference	14–0–1	3–0–1
1904†	Henry L. Williams	Western Conference	13–0	3–0
1906†	Henry L. Williams	Western Conference	4–1	2–0
1909	Henry L. Williams	Western Conference	6–1	3–0
1910†	Henry L. Williams	Western Conference	6–1	2–0
1911	Henry L. Williams	Western Conference	6–0–1	3–0–1
1915†	Henry L. Williams	Western Conference	6–0–1	3–0–1
1927†	Clarence Spears	Big Ten Conference	6–0–2	3–0–1
1933†	Bernie Bierman	Big Ten Conference	4–0–4	2–0–4
1934	Bernie Bierman	Big Ten Conference	8–0	5–0
1935†	Bernie Bierman	Big Ten Conference	8–0	5–0
1937	Bernie Bierman	Big Ten Conference	6–2	5–0
1938	Bernie Bierman	Big Ten Conference	6–2	4–1
1940	Bernie Bierman	Big Ten Conference	8–0	6–0
1941	Bernie Bierman	Big Ten Conference	8–0	5–0
1960†	Murray Warmath	Big Ten Conference	8–2	6–1
1967†	Murray Warmath	Big Ten Conference	8–2	6–1

† Co-champions

=== Division championships ===
Big Ten Football adopted divisions in 2011, with the winner of each division playing for the conference championship. The divisions were known as Legends and Leaders from 2011 to 2013. In 2014, the divisions were realigned geographically into East and West. Minnesota competed in the Big Ten West Division (the Big Ten stopped using the divisional format beginning with the 2024 season). Minnesota has shared one division title, in 2019.

Season	Division	Coach	Opponent	CG result
2019†	Big Ten – West	P. J. Fleck	N/A lost tiebreaker to Wisconsin	

† Co-champions

== Bowl games ==
Minnesota has played in 26 bowl games, amassing a record of 14–12.

No.	Season	Coach	Bowl	Opponent	Result
1	1960	Murray Warmath	Rose Bowl	Washington	L 7–17
2	1961	Murray Warmath	Rose Bowl	UCLA	W 21–3
3	1977	Cal Stoll	Hall of Fame Classic	Maryland	L 6–21
4	1985	John Gutekunst	Independence Bowl	Clemson	W 20–13
5	1986	John Gutekunst	Liberty Bowl	Tennessee	L 14–21
6	1999	Glen Mason	Sun Bowl	Oregon	L 20–24
7	2000	Glen Mason	MicronPC.com Bowl	NC State	L 30–38
8	2002	Glen Mason	Music City Bowl	Arkansas	W 29–14
9	2003	Glen Mason	Sun Bowl	Oregon	W 31–30
10	2004	Glen Mason	Music City Bowl	Alabama	W 20–16
11	2005	Glen Mason	Music City Bowl	Virginia	L 31–34
12	2006	Glen Mason	Insight Bowl	Texas Tech	L 41–44^{OT}
13	2008	Tim Brewster	Insight Bowl	Kansas	L 21–42
14	2009	Tim Brewster	Insight Bowl	Iowa State	L 13–14
15	2012	Jerry Kill	Meineke Car Care Bowl of Texas	Texas Tech	L 31–34
16	2013	Jerry Kill	Texas Bowl	Syracuse	L 17–21
17	2014	Jerry Kill	Citrus Bowl	Missouri	L 17–33
18	2015	Tracy Claeys	Quick Lane Bowl	Central Michigan	W 21–14
19	2016	Tracy Claeys	Holiday Bowl	Washington State	W 17–12
20	2018	P. J. Fleck	Quick Lane Bowl	Georgia Tech	W 34–10
21	2019	P. J. Fleck	Outback Bowl	Auburn	W 31–24
22	2021	P. J. Fleck	Guaranteed Rate Bowl	West Virginia	W 18–6
23	2022	P. J. Fleck	Pinstripe Bowl	Syracuse	W 28–20
24	2023	P. J. Fleck	Quick Lane Bowl	Bowling Green	W 30–24
25	2024	P. J. Fleck	Duke's Mayo Bowl	Virginia Tech	W 24–10
26	2025	P. J. Fleck	Rate Bowl	New Mexico	W 20–17^{OT}

Bowl record by game

Bowl Game	#	W	L	%
Citrus Bowl	1	0	1	.000
Duke's Mayo Bowl	1	1	0	1.000
Guaranteed Rate Bowl (Insight Bowl)	5	2	3	.400
Hall of Fame Classic	1	0	1	.000
Holiday Bowl	1	1	0	1.000
Independence Bowl	1	1	0	1.000
Liberty Bowl	1	0	1	.000
MicronPC.com Bowl	1	0	1	.000
Music City Bowl	3	2	1	.666
Outback Bowl	1	1	0	1.000
Pinstripe Bowl	1	1	0	1.000
Quick Lane Bowl	3	3	0	1.000
Rose Bowl	2	1	1	.500
Sun Bowl	2	1	1	.500
Texas Bowl	2	0	2	.000

== Head coaches ==
List of head football coaches showing season(s) coached, overall records (Note: Statistics correct as of the end of the 2023 NCAA Division I FBS football season.)
No.	Coach	Years	Season(s)	GC	OW	OL	OT	O%
—	No Coach	1	1882	2	1	1	0	.500
1	Thomas Peebles	1	1883	3	1	2	0	.333
—	No Team	2	1884–1885	—	—	—	—	—
2	Frederick S. Jones	3	1886–1888	6	3	3	0	.500
3	Al McCord; D. W. McCord; Frank Heffelfinger; Billy Morse	1	1889	4	3	1	0	.750
4	Tom Eck	1	1890	7	5	1	1	.786
5	Edward Moulton	1	1891	5	3	1	1	.700
—	No Coach	1	1892	5	5	0	0	1.000
6	Wallace Winter	1	1893	6	6	0	0	1.000
7	Tom Cochrane Jr.	1	1894	4	3	1	0	.750
8	Pudge Heffelfinger	1	1895	10	7	3	0	.700
9	Alexander Jerrems	2	1896–1897	18	12	6	0	.667
10	Jack Minds	1	1898	9	4	5	0	.444
11	Jack Harrison; William C. Leary	1	1899	11	6	3	2	.636
12	Henry L. Williams	22	1900–1921	180	136	33	11	.786
13	William H. Spaulding	3	1922–1924	22	11	7	4	.591
14	Clarence Spears	5	1925–1929	40	28	9	3	.738
15	Fritz Crisler	2	1930–1931	18	10	7	1	.583
16	Bernie Bierman	16	1932–1941; 1945–1950	134	93	35	6	.716
17	George Hauser	3	1942–1944	27	15	11	1	.574
18	Wes Fesler	3	1951–1953	27	10	13	4	.444
19	Murray Warmath	18	1954–1971	172	87	78	7	.526
20	Cal Stoll	7	1972–1978	78	39	39	0	.500
21	Joe Salem	5	1979–1983	55	19	35	1	.355
22	Lou Holtz	2	1984–1985	22	10	12	0	.455
23	John Gutekunst	6	1986–1991	67	29	36	2	.448
24	Jim Wacker	5	1992–1996	55	16	39	0	.291
25	Glen Mason	10	1997–2006	121	64	57	0	.529
26	Tim Brewster	4	2007–2010	45	15	30	—	.333
Int	Jeff Horton	1	2010	5	2	3	—	.400
27	Jerry Kill	5	2011–2015	58	29	29	—	.500
28	Tracy Claeys	2	2015—2016	19	11	8	—	.579
29	P. J. Fleck	9	2017–present	115	70	45	—	.609

== Rivalries ==
Three of the Minnesota football team conference rivalries are regarded among the top 100 in college football: Wisconsin (number 10), Iowa (number 34) and Michigan (number 51). With the rivalries are a set of unique trophies that are considered three of the top 25: Floyd of Rosedale (Iowa), The Paul Bunyan Axe (Wisconsin), and The Little Brown Jug (Michigan). Traditionally, the team that wins the game seizes the trophy from the sidelines.

=== Wisconsin ===
The Minnesota-Wisconsin rivalry is the most-played rivalry in the NCAA Division I Football Bowl Subdivision. The winner of the game receives Paul Bunyan's Axe, a tradition that started in 1948 after the first trophy, the Slab of Bacon, disappeared. Minnesota dominated the series for most of the first half of the 20th century, and Wisconsin similarly dominated the series from the early 1990s until 2018, accruing a 14-game win streak for the Badgers which gave Wisconsin its first-ever lead in the series in 2017. Minnesota currently leads the series with a record of 64–63–8 through the 2025 season.

=== Iowa ===
The winner of the game is awarded the Floyd of Rosedale, 98 lb (44 kg) a bronze pig trophy. The trophy began in 1935, when, in an effort to deescalate tensions between the two teams and fan bases, Minnesota Governor Floyd Olson bet Iowa Governor Clyde L. Herring a prize hog against an Iowa prize hog that Minnesota would win the game. After Minnesota's victory, Governor Herring obtained a pig donated by Rosedale Farms and named the hog after Governor Olson, giving birth to Floyd of Rosedale. Minnesota leads the series with Iowa 63–53–2 through the 2024 season.

=== Michigan ===
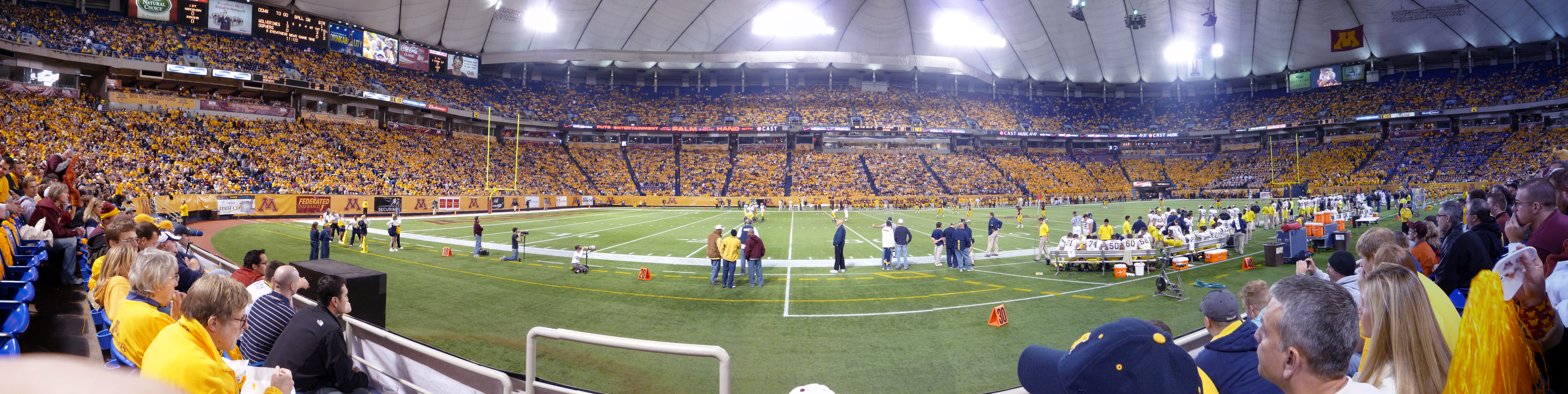
The 91st battle for the Little Brown Jug between the Minnesota Golden Gophers and Michigan Wolverines in the Metrodome

The Michigan–Minnesota football rivalry is the first and oldest trophy game in college football history. The winner of the game is awarded the Little Brown Jug, a five-gallon earthenware jug. The jug was used by Michigan in the 1903 matchup to prevent Minnesota from tampering with its water supply, and, according to folklore, stolen from Michigan by a Minnesota custodian after the game. Michigan leads the series 78–26–3 with the last game played in 2026.

=== Nebraska ===
The winner of the Minnesota-Nebraska game is awarded the $5 Bits of Broken Chair Trophy, which is an unofficial trophy created by fans after a good-humored back and forth between the Twitter accounts for Minnesota mascot Goldy Gopher and a parody account for then-head coach Bo Pelini. The trophy was officially rejected by both universities, although groups associated with each university continue to use the trophy as a fundraiser around the annual matchup. Minnesota leads the series with Nebraska 37–25–2 through the 2024 season.

== Facilities ==
=== Huntington Bank Stadium ===
Huntington Bank Stadium is the football stadium for the Minnesota Golden Gophers college football team at the University of Minnesota in Minneapolis, Minnesota. The 52,525-seat on-campus "horseshoe" style stadium is designed to support future expansion to seat up to 80,000 people, and cost $303.3 million to build. The stadium was the temporary home of the Minnesota Vikings of the National Football League for the 2014 and 2015 seasons while U.S. Bank Stadium was being built.

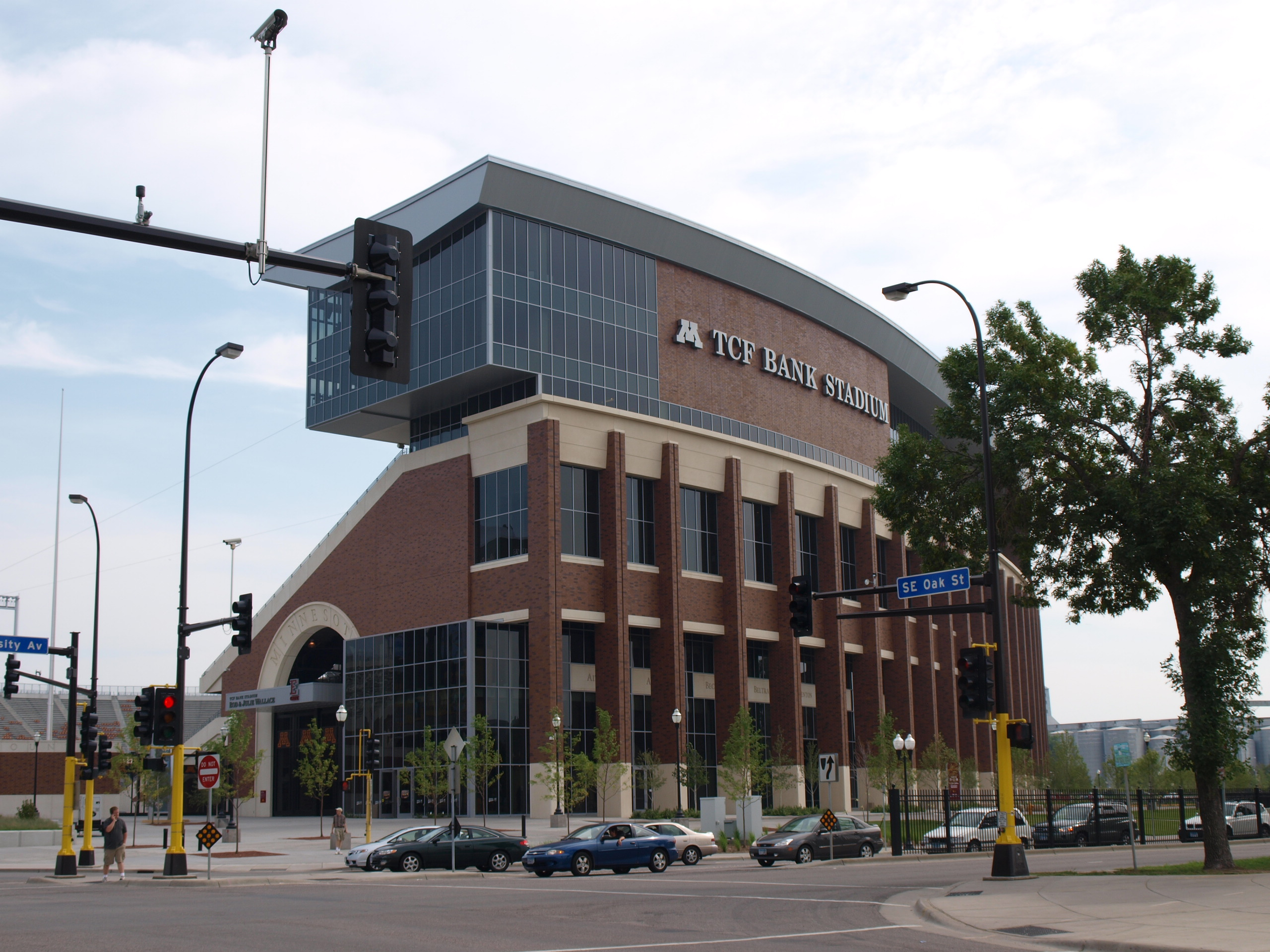
TCF Bank Stadium, photographed from the corner of University Ave and Oak St

=== Gibson-Nagurski Football Complex ===
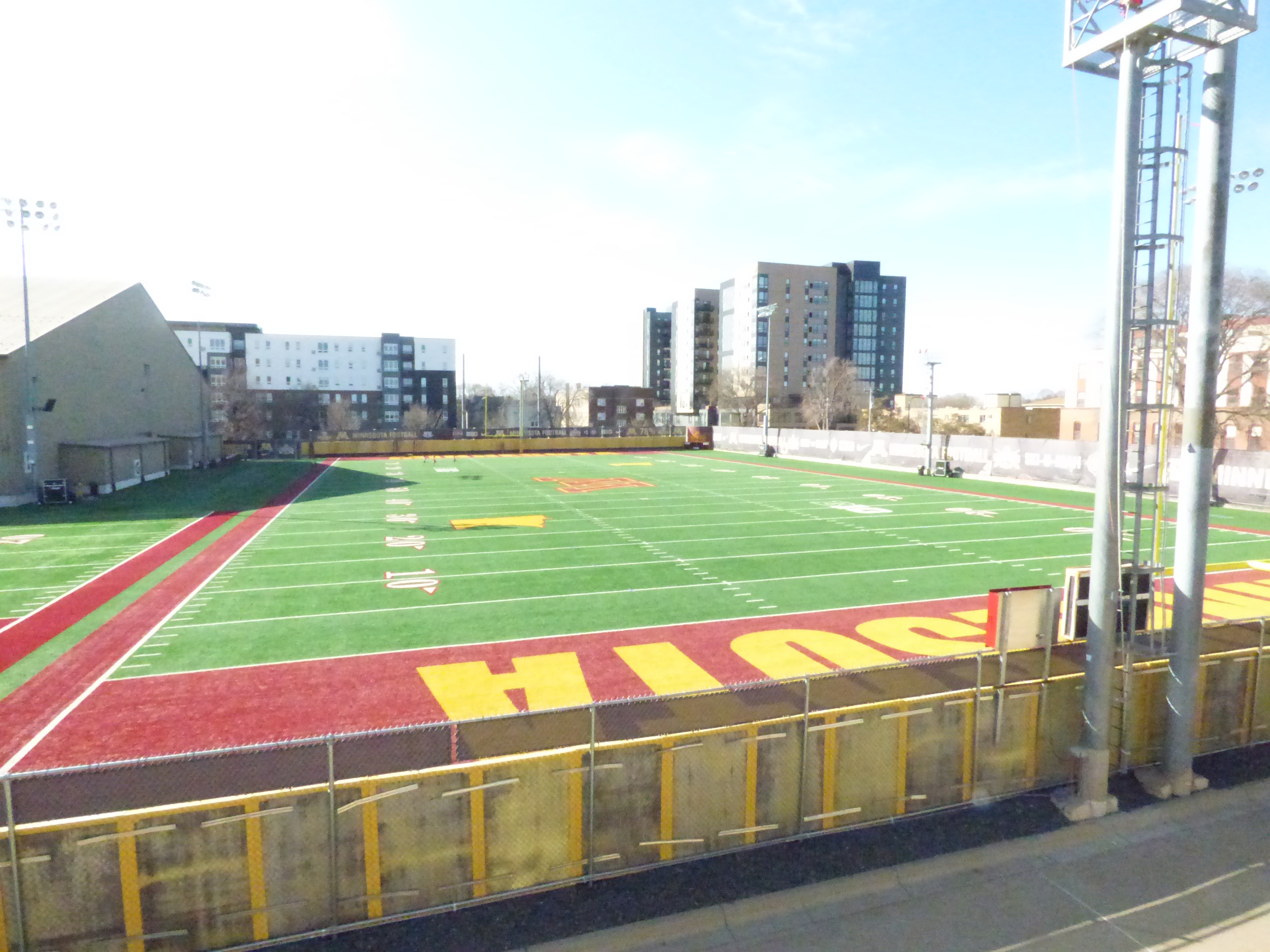
The Gophers' practice field outside the Gibson-Nagurski Football Complex.

The complex houses the team administrative offices, locker room, meeting rooms, equipment room, training room, and players' lounges. It is named after Gopher teammates from the 1920s, George Gibson and Bronko Nagurski.

=== Former venues ===
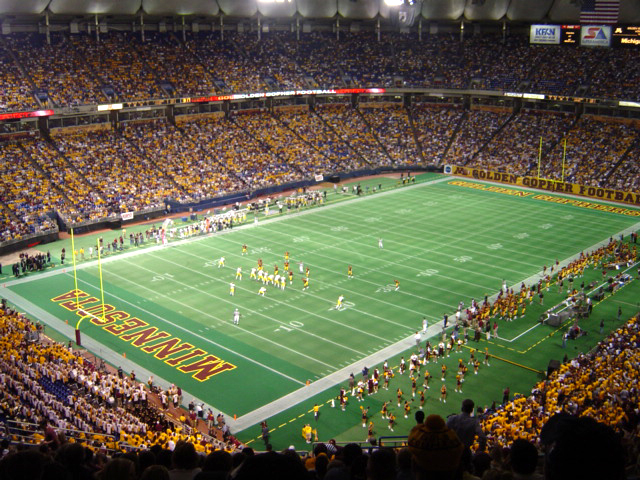
Gophers football inside the Metrodome

- Northrop Field (1899–1923)
- Memorial Stadium (1924–1981)
- Hubert H. Humphrey Metrodome (1982–2008)

== Individual award winners ==
=== Retired numbers ===
The Golden Gophers has retired three numbers.

Minnesota Golden Gophers retired numbers
No.	Player	Pos.	Tenure	Date ret.	Ref.
10	Paul Giel	HB	1951–1953	September 24, 1991	
54	Bruce Smith	HB	1939–1941	June 27, 1977	
72	Bronko Nagurski	FB/T	1927–1929	October 27, 1979	

=== Retired jerseys ===
Additionally, the Golden Gophers have retired two jerseys. This honor is distinguished from "retired numbers" because the numbers of these players can be worn by any player normally.

Minnesota Golden Gophers retired jerseys
No.	Player	Pos.	Tenure	Date ret.
15	Sandy Stephens	QB	1959–1961	November 18, 2000
78	Bobby Bell	T	1960–1962	September 18, 2010

=== National ===
==== Players ====
- Heisman Trophy

Bruce Smith – 1941

- Outland Trophy

Tom Brown – 1960
Bobby Bell – 1962
Greg Eslinger – 2005

- Jim Thorpe Award

Tyrone Carter – 1999

- Dave Rimington Trophy

Greg Eslinger – 2005

- John Mackey Award

Matt Spaeth – 2006

==== Coaches ====
- Amos Alonzo Stagg Award

Bernie Bierman – 1958

- Eddie Robinson Coach of the Year

Murray Warmath – 1960

- Paul "Bear" Bryant Award

Murray Warmath – 1960

=== Big Ten Conference ===
==== Players ====
- Most Valuable Player

Biggie Munn – 1931
Pug Lund – 1934
Paul Giel – 1952, 1953
Tom Brown – 1960
Sandy Stephens – 1961

- Offensive lineman of the Year

Greg Eslinger – 2005
Aireontae Ersery – 2024

- Defensive Lineman of the Year

Karon Riley – 2000

- Freshman of the Year

Darrell Thompson – 1986
Laurence Maroney – 2003

- Running back of the Year

Mohamed Ibrahim – 2020

- Receiver of the Year

Rashod Bateman – 2019

- Tight end of the Year

Maxx Williams – 2014

- Defensive back of the Year

Antoine Winfield Jr. – 2019

- Kicker of the Year

Emmit Carpenter – 2016
Dragan Kesich – 2023

- Punter of the Year

Peter Mortell – 2014

==== Coach ====
- Coach of the Year

Glen Mason – 1999
Jerry Kill – 2014
P. J. Fleck – 2019

== College Football Hall of Famers ==
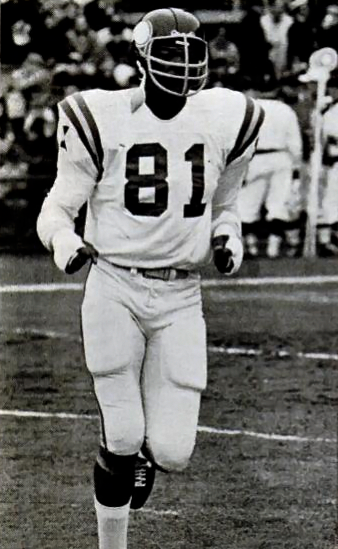
T Carl Eller

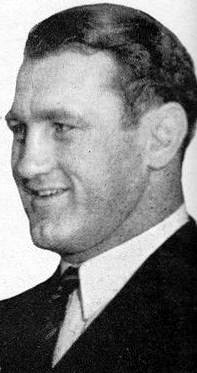
FB/T Bronko Nagurski

Inductees as of 2024.

Name	Position(s)	Inducted	Years	Ref.
Bert Baston	E	1954	1914–1916	
Bobby Bell	T	1991	1960–1962	
Bernie Bierman	HC	1955	1932–1941; 1945–1950	
Tom Brown	G	2003	1958–1960	
Fritz Crisler	HC	1954	1930–1931	
Carl Eller	T	2006	1961–1963	
George Franck	HB	2002	1938–1940	
Paul Giel	HB	1975	1951–1953	
Lou Holtz	HC	2008	1984–1985	
Herb Joesting	FB	1954	1925–1927	
Pug Lund	HB	1958	1932–1934	
Bobby Marshall	E	1971	1904–1906	
John McGovern	QB	1966	1908–1910	
Bronko Nagurski	FB, T	1951	1927–1929	
Leo Nomellini	T, G	1977	1946–1949	
Eddie Rogers	E	1968	1900–1903	
Bruce Smith	HB	1972	1939–1941	
Bob Stein	DE	2020	1966–1968	
Sandy Stephens	QB	2011	1959–1961	
Clayton Tonnemaker	C	1980	1946–1949	
Ed Widseth	T	1954	1934–1936	
Dick Wildung	T	1957	1940–1942	
Henry L. Williams	HC	1951	1900–1921	

== Pro Football Hall of Famers ==
Inductees as of 2026.

Name	Position(s)	Class	Team(s), Years
Bobby Bell	DE, LB	1983	Kansas City Chiefs, 1963–1974
Tony Dungy	Head coach	2016	Tampa Bay Buccaneers, 1996–2001; Indianapolis Colts, 2002–2008
Carl Eller	DE	2004	Minnesota Vikings, 1964–1978; Seattle Seahawks, 1979
Bud Grant	Head coach	1994	Minnesota Vikings, 1967–1983, 1985
Bronko Nagurski	FB	1963	Chicago Bears 1930–1937, 1943
Leo Nomellini	DT	1969	San Francisco 49ers 1950–1963
Charlie Sanders	TE	2007	Detroit Lions 1968–1977

== Canadian Football Hall of Fame ==
Inductees as of 2017.

Name	Position(s)	Class	Team(s), Years
Tom Brown	DL	1984	BC Lions, 1961–1967
Bud Grant	TE; Head coach	1983	Winnipeg Blue Bombers, 1953–1966

== Current professional players ==
=== NFL ===
Golden Gophers in the NFL
NFL Draft selections
Total selected:	333
1st Round:	18
NFL achievements
Total Players:	215
Hall of Famers:	7

List current as of November 14, 2026.

Player	Position	Draft class	Current team
Rashod Bateman	WR	2021	Baltimore Ravens
Kyler Baugh	DE	Undrafted in 2024	Pittsburgh Steelers
Max Brosmer	QB	Undrafted in 2025	Minnesota Vikings
Blake Cashman	LB	2019	Minnesota Vikings
Deven Eastern	DT	2026	Seattle Seahawks
Aireontae Ersery	T	2025	Houston Texans
Daniel Faalele	T	2022	Jacksonville Jaguars
Jack Gibbens	LB	Undrafted in 2022	Arizona Cardinals
Jordan Howden	S	2023	New Orleans Saints
Nick Kallerup	TE	Undrafted in 2025	Seattle Seahawks
Ko Kieft	TE	2022	Tampa Bay Buccaneers
Cody Lindenberg	LB	2025	Las Vegas Raiders
Boye Mafe	DE	2022	Cincinnati Bengals
Eric Murray	S	2016	Jacksonville Jaguars
Tyler Nubin	S	2024	New York Giants
Esezi Otomewo	DT	2022	Pittsburgh Steelers
John Michael Schmitz	C	2023	New York Giants
Brevyn Spann-Ford	TE	Undrafted in 2024	Dallas Cowboys
Benjamin St-Juste	CB	2021	Green Bay Packers
Danny Striggow	DE	Undrafted in 2025	Jacksonville Jaguars
Justin Walley	CB	2025	Indianapolis Colts
Antoine Winfield Jr.	S	2020	Tampa Bay Buccaneers

=== Other professional leagues ===
Player	Position	Current team	League
Chris Collins	DE	Orlando Storm	UFL
Chuck Filiaga	G	Columbus Aviators	UFL
Tre'Von Jones	CB	Columbus Aviators	UFL
Marcus Major Jr.	RB	Dallas Renegades	UFL

== Other notable coaches and players ==
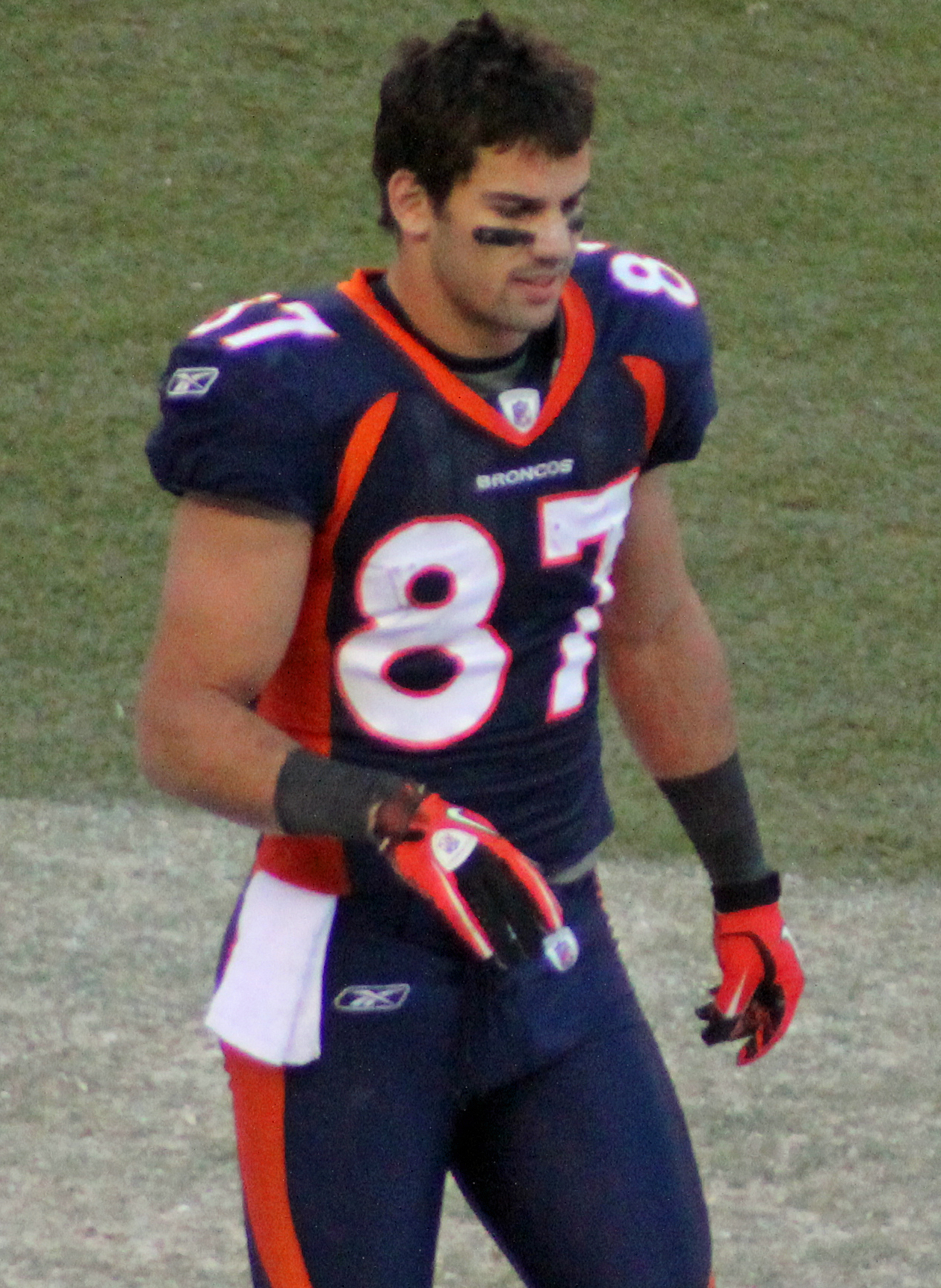
WR Eric Decker

- Marion Barber Jr. – Retired NFL Running back
- Phil Bengtson – Retired NFL Head coach
- Rene Capo – Olympic judoka
- Gino Cappelletti – All-time AFL scoring leader
- Eric Decker – Retired NFL Wide receiver
- Gil Dobie – Won two national championships as head coach of the Cornell Big Red football team
- Tony Dungy – Retired NFL Head coach
- Verne Gagne – Professional wrestler; founder AWA
- Tony Levine – Head coach of the Houston Cougars football team
- Len Levy – American football player and professional wrestler
- Chip Lohmiller – Retired NFL Kicker
- Karl Mecklenburg – Retired NFL Linebacker
- Cory Sauter – Retired NFL Quarterback
- Darrell Thompson – Retired NFL Running back, current Gophers football radio announcer
- Rick Upchurch – Retired NFL Wide receiver
- DeWayne Walker – Current defensive backs coach Cleveland Browns
- Murray Warmath – Last head coach to lead Minnesota to the Rose Bowl and National Championship
- Bud Wilkinson – Won three national championships as head coach of the Oklahoma Sooners football team
- Norries Wilson – Head coach, Columbia Lions football team, first African American head football coach in the Ivy League
- Wayne Robinson Retired NFL linebacker, CFL and NFL coach

== Future non-conference opponents ==
Announced schedules as of May 15, 2025

No opponents currently scheduled for the 2029 and 2031 seasons.

2025	2026	2027	2028	2029	2030	2031	2032	2033
vs Buffalo	vs Eastern Illinois	vs San Jose State	vs North Dakota		vs North Dakota		vs Alabama	at Alabama
vs Northwestern State	vs Mississippi State	at Mississippi State	vs Bowling Green					
at California	vs Akron	vs Lindenwood	vs California					
