= Rhys Lloyd (American football) =

American football player (born 1982)

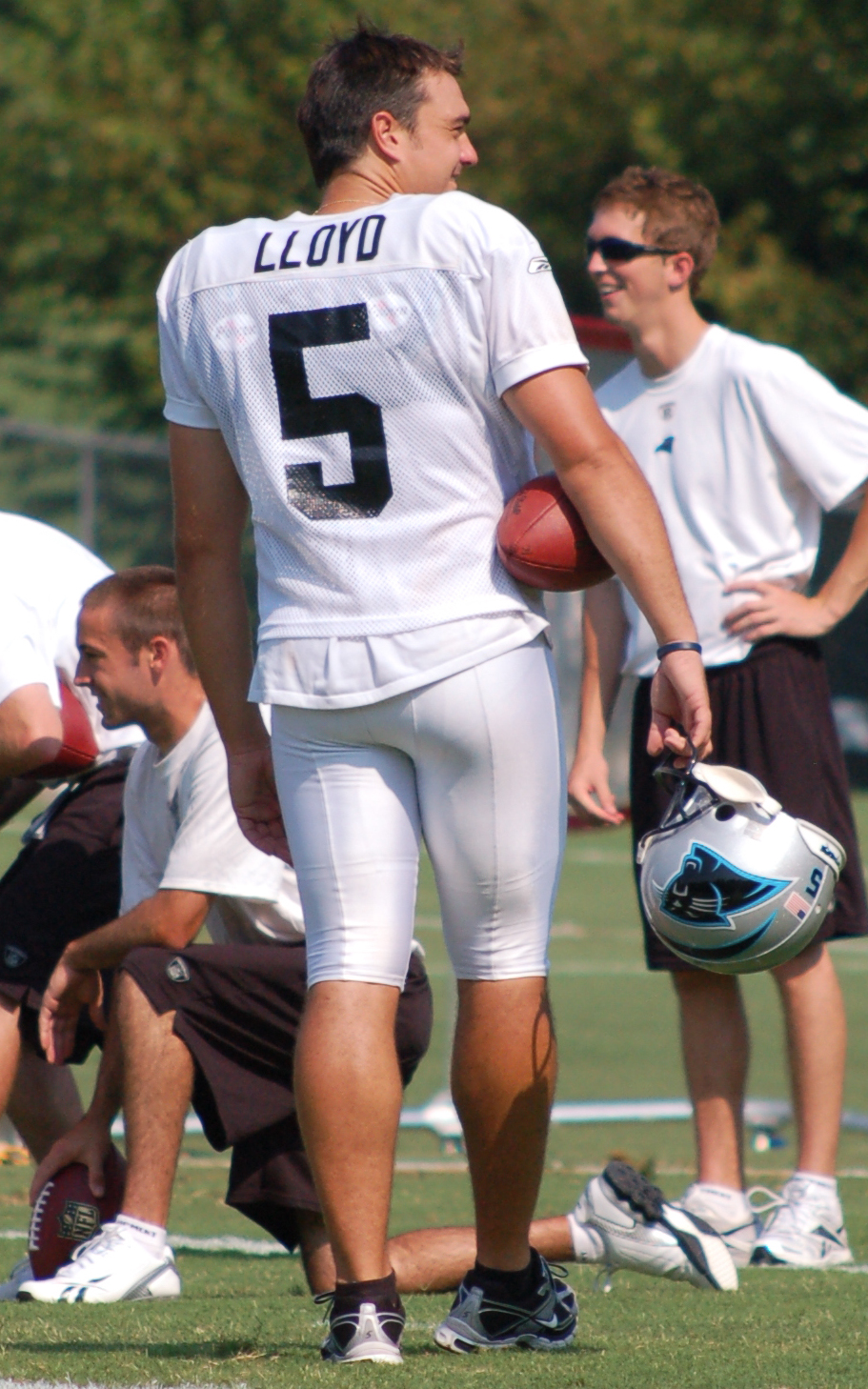
- Lloyd with the Carolina Panthers in 2009

No. 5, 3, 8
- Position: Kickoff specialist

Personal information
- Born: 5 June 1982 (age 44); Dover, England
- Listed height: 5 ft 11 in (1.80 m)
- Listed weight: 238 lb (108 kg)

Career information
- High school: Eastview (Apple Valley, Minnesota)
- College: Rochester (MN) (2001–2002); Minnesota (2003–2004)
- NFL draft: 2005: undrafted

Career history
- Baltimore Ravens (2005)*; Green Bay Packers (2006)*; Frankfurt Galaxy (2006–2007); Baltimore Ravens (2007); Carolina Panthers (2007–2009); Minnesota Vikings (2010); Carolina Panthers (2010); New York Giants (2011)*
- * Offseason or practice squad member only

Career NFL statistics
- Kickoffs: 224
- Kickoff yards: 14,987
- Touchbacks: 64
- Stats at Pro Football Reference

Rhys John Lloyd (born 5 June 1982) is a former American football kickoff specialist. He was signed by the Baltimore Ravens as an undrafted free agent in 2005. He played college football at Minnesota.

Lloyd was also a member of the Green Bay Packers, Frankfurt Galaxy, Carolina Panthers, Minnesota Vikings, and New York Giants.

== Early life ==
Lloyd began playing football after moving from England to the United States at 15 years old. He attended Eastview High School in Apple Valley, Minnesota and lettered in football and soccer.

== College career ==
Lloyd was a two-time All-American placekicker for Rochester Community and Technical College. He was later the placekicker, kickoff man and punter for the Minnesota Golden Gophers from 2003 to 2004. He kicked the game-winning field goal in the 2003 Sun Bowl.

== Professional career ==
=== Early NFL career ===
Lloyd entered the NFL draft, but had to sign as an undrafted free agent after the 2005 draft with the Baltimore Ravens, who released him before the start of the regular season. On 10 April 2006, he was signed by the Green Bay Packers; however, he was subsequently released on 1 May 2006.

=== NFL Europa ===
Rhys was signed by the Frankfurt Galaxy of the NFL Europa in 2007. He was named the NFL Europa special teams player of the week in week 3 by tying the league record for the longest field goal in League history with a 56 yarder. Lloyd had signed with the Frankfurt Galaxy at the conclusion of NFL Europa kicking camp in Tampa, Florida. He played the 2006–2007 season in Europe and then came back to the US.

=== Return to NFL ===
Lloyd signed with the Baltimore Ravens again as a free agent in 2007 and made an impressive 55-yard field goal in the Ravens preseason finale against Atlanta and, subsequently, survived the Ravens final cut and signed with the team for the regular season as a kicker. He went back and forth between being on the active roster, on the practice squad, and being a free agent.

Lloyd was claimed off waivers by the Carolina Panthers on 26 December 2007. He signed a multi-year contract with the team in 2008. The Panthers used Lloyd as a kickoff specialist, with veteran placekicker John Kasay handling the field goal duties. Lloyd led the NFL in 2008 in touchbacks on kickoffs with 30 on the season. Lloyd signed with the Minnesota Vikings on 8 March 2010. This deal put him back near his alma mater Eastview High School in Apple Valley, Minnesota. He was released by the Vikings on 4 September 2010.

Carolina signed Rhys Lloyd on 14 September 2010. Their previous kickoff starter, Todd Carter (who started the first game of the Panthers 2010 season) was suffering from back spasms, and was cut to allow roster space for Lloyd. On 16 August 2011, Lloyd signed with the New York Giants. He was released during final preseason cuts on 3 September 2011.
