= 2004 Music City Bowl =

2004 Gaylord Hotels Music City Bowl presented by Bridgestone
- 7th Music City Bowl
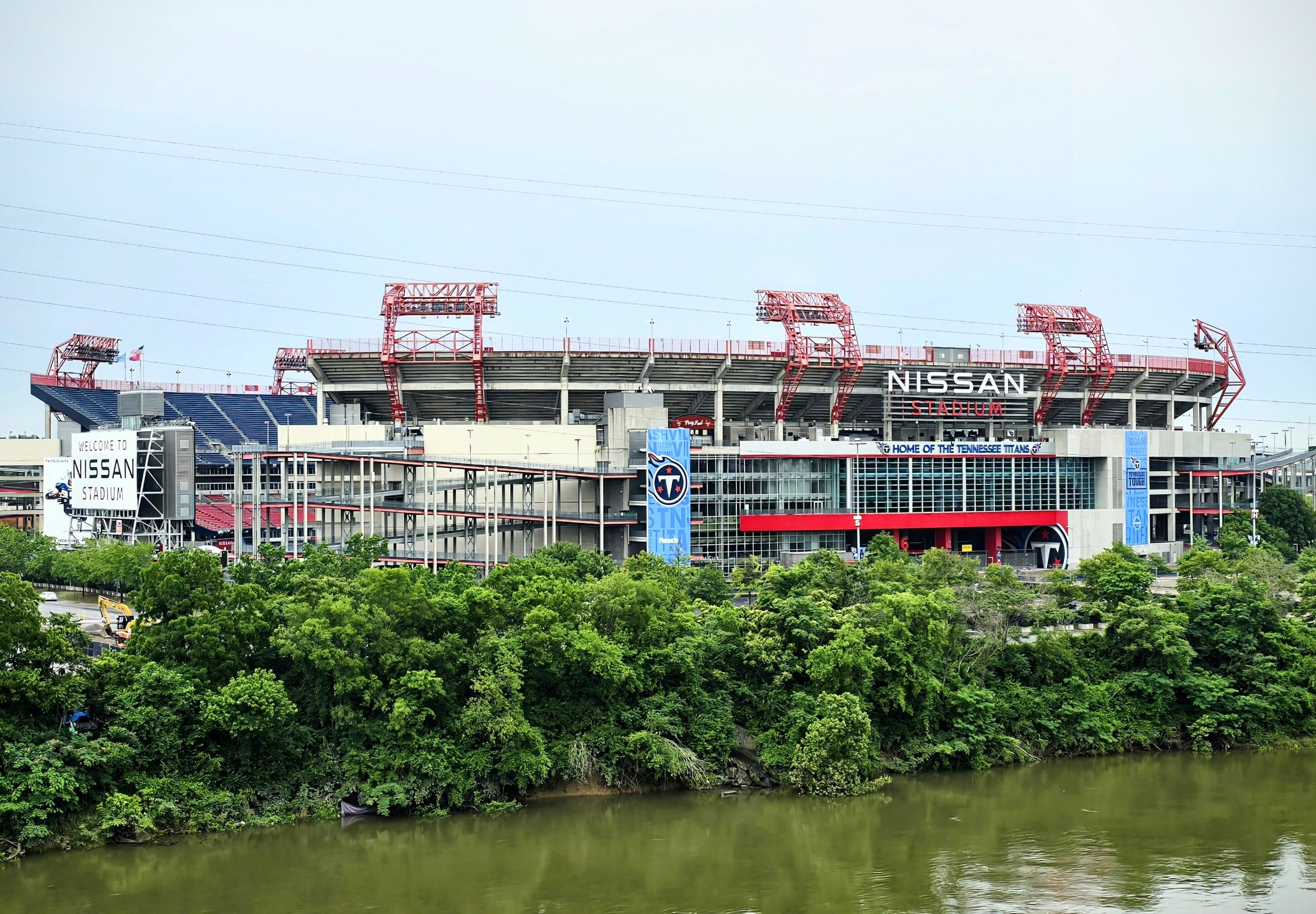
- The Coliseum in Nashville, Tennessee, hosted the Music City Bowl.
Alabama Crimson Tide	Minnesota Golden Gophers
(6–5)	(6–5)
SEC	Big Ten
16	20
Head coach: Mike Shula	Head coach: Glen Mason
	1	2	3	4	Total
Alabama	7	7	0	2	16
Minnesota	7	10	3	0	20
- Date: December 31, 2004
- Season: 2004
- Stadium: The Coliseum
- Location: Nashville, Tennessee
- MVP: RB Marion Barber III, Minnesota
- Referee: Jack Cramer (Big East)
- Attendance: 66,089
- Payout: US$1,110,125 per team

United States TV coverage
- Network: ESPN
- Nielsen ratings: 3.14

The 2004 Music City Bowl was held on December 31, 2004, in Nashville, Tennessee, at The Coliseum. The game featured the Alabama Crimson Tide, of the SEC, and the Minnesota Golden Gophers, of the Big Ten. The game was ultimately won by Minnesota, 20–16. Sponsored by Gaylord Hotels and Bridgestone, it was officially named the Gaylord Hotels Music City Bowl presented by Bridgestone.

Alabama was led by head coach Mike Shula and entered a game with a 6–5 record, as the team ended their 2004 regular season by losing three of their final four games. The Crimson Tide offense was led by quarterback Spencer Pennginton, who was a backup at the beginning of the season, but was put into the starting role when Brodie Croyle was injured versus Western Carolina. Pennington led the Crimson Tide to a 3–4 record as a starter and was the starting quarterback in the bowl game. Alabama also entered to the second-ranked overall defense in the country.

Glen Mason led the Golden Gophers into the bowl game, who also had a 6–5 record. The Golden Gophers ended their 2004 regular season by losing five of their final six games after a 5–0 start. The Minnesota offense was led by two 1,000-yard rushers in Laurence Maroney and Marion Barber III, the latter of which would be named MVP of the bowl game. The two running backs combined for 2,617 yards and twenty-three touchdowns.

== Game ==
=== First quarter ===
Minnesota began the first drive of the game at their own 20–yard line following a touchback on the opening kickoff. Alabama quickly forced a turnover as Marion Barber III fumbled the ball, which Freddie Roach recovered and returned to the Minnesota 2–yard line. On their first play, Alabama quarterback Spencer Pennington completed a 2–yard touchdown pass to Le'Ron McClain, and following a Brian Bostick PAT, the Crimson Tide took an early 7–0 lead. On their next two drives, Minnesota quarterback Bryan Cupito threw two interceptions, which Roman Harper and Anthony Madison intercepted, respectively.

Following the interception by Madison, Alabama began their drive at the 2–yard line. The Crimson Tide offense moved the ball only four yards before Spencer Pennington fumbled the ball. Keith Lipka recovered the fumble and returned it for a 1–yard touchdown, Minnesota and Alabama were back level at 7–7.

Following a return by Tyrone Prothro on the kickoff, Alabama began at their own 15–yard line. The offense quickly picked up a first down after a 14–yard pass from Pennington to D. J. Hall. After the first down, the Crimson Tide offense stalled before Prothro fumbled the ball, recovered by Minnesota defensive back Justin Fraley. Running backs Marion Barber and Laurence Maroney quickly moved the ball forty-two yards in the final 2:54 to the Alabama 5–yard line before the end of the first quarter.

=== Second quarter ===
On the first play of the second quarter, Marion Barber rushed up the middle for a 5–yard touchdown. Following the PAT from Rhys Lloyd, Minnesota took a 14–7 lead.

Alabama began their first drive of the second quarter at the 35–yard line following the kickoff. The Crimson Tide offense was quickly stifled as Pennington was sacked for an 8–yard loss on the first play. After two more plays, the offense only gained three yards before a Bo Freeland punt to the Minnesota 31–yard line. As usual, the Minnesota offense struck to their ground game as Barber and Maroney combined for sixty yards on ten carries to get the ball to the Alabama 9–yard line. After an incomplete pass and two penalties, the Golden Gophers finished the drive with a 26–yard field goal from Rhys Lloyd, extending their lead to 17–7.

On their second drive of the quarter, Alabama began at their own 27–yard line. Le'Ron McClain caught a 7–yard pass on the first play as the Alabama offense steadily moved down field to the 46–yard line. On a 2nd-and-6, Spencer Pennington completed a 40–yard pass to wide receiver Keith Brown as the offense moved the ball to the Minnesota 6–yard line. On a 3rd-and-goal situation, Minnesota's defense gave the Alabama offense an automatic first down, placing the ball at the 2–yard line. After a 1–yard rush, McClain ran into the endzone for a 1–yard touchdown as Alabama trailed 17–14 with less than three minutes left in the first half.

After conservative play-calling by Minnesota, the Golden Gophers punted the ball to Alabama with only twenty-eight seconds remaining. After a 15–yard penalty on Minnesota, the Alabama offense moved to the 31–yard line. Spencer Pennington completed two quick passes to Matt Caddell and D. J. Hall, moving the ball to the Minnesota 47–yard line. After a timeout, Pennington completed yet another pass Keith Brown to the 37–yard line. On the final play before halftime, Pennington lateralled the ball to Tyrone Prothro for a 13–yard gain. The offense ran out of time, and failing to score, Alabama trailed 17–14 at halftime.

=== Third quarter ===
Minnesota kicked off to begin the third quarter, which Tyrone Prothro returned to the 26–yard line. Once again, the Alabama offense struggled to move the ball and was forced to punt. Minnesota's first drive began on their own 25–yard line. Laurence Maroney ran for ten yards on the first two plays of the drive, giving Minnesota a first down. Two plays later, Marion Barber broke off a 25–yard run to move the ball to the Alabama 23–yard line. After three more rushes by Barber and two incomplete passes, Rhys Lloyd kicked a 25–yard field goal to give Minnesota a six-point lead.

For the remainder of the quarter, both offenses struggled to move the ball. Both teams combined for four punts and one turnover in the final 10:10 of the third quarter.

=== Fourth quarter ===
Following another stalled drive for both offenses, Minnesota started a drive at Alabama's 48–yard line. Both Maroney and Barber split the carries again, gradually moving the ball downfield over the next 6:26 to the 14–yard line. Rhys Lloyd missed a 31–yard line to end Minnesota's drive, his sixth missed field goal of the season.

Down 20–14, the Alabama offense started at their own 14–yard line following the missed field goal. Spencer Pennington completed a 23–yard pass to D. J. Hall, moving the ball to the 43–yard line. Three incomplete passes followed, forcing Alabama to punt once again. Minnesota took over at their own 10–yard line and failed to gain a first down, forcing a punt. However, Alabama tackled punter Rhys Lloyd in the end zone, gaining two points from the safety, and bringing themselves within four points at 20–16.

Following the safety, Minnesota was forced to give Alabama the ball on a free kick. On the first three plays, Pennington completed three passes, giving Alabama a first down at the Minnesota 19–yard line. On the next three plays, the Pennington threw two incomplete passes, and a short, 4–yard completion to Matt Caddell. On 4th-and-6, Pennington threw another incompletion, turning the ball over on downs.

Minnesota started their final drive with just 1:26 left. As Alabama had used all three of their timeouts in the second half, Minnesota quarterback Bryan Cupito only needed to take a knee twice to run out the remainder of the clock, giving Minnesota a 20–16 win for their seventh victory of the season. The loss sent Alabama to a .500 record at 6–6, losing their final three games.

== Scoring summary ==
Scoring summary

Quarter	Time	Drive			Team	Scoring information	Score	
Quarter	Time	Plays	Yards	TOP	Team	Scoring information	Alabama	Minnesota
1	14:12	1	2	0:13	Alabama	Le'Ron McClain 2-yard touchdown reception from Spencer Pennington, Brian Bostick kick good	7	0
1	4:21	1	1	–	Minnesota	Fumble recovery returned 1 yard for touchdown by Keith Lipka, Rhys Lloyd kick good	7	7
2	14:57	9	53	2:57	Minnesota	Marion Barber III 5-yard touchdown run, Rhys Lloyd kick good	7	14
2	8:07	13	59	4:47	Minnesota	27-yard field goal by Rhys Lloyd	7	17
2	2:57	10	73	5:12	Alabama	Le'Ron McClain 1-yard touchdown run, Brian Bostick kick good	14	17
3	10:16	11	68	2:59	Minnesota	24-yard field goal by Rhys Lloyd	14	20
4	3:11	–	–	–	Alabama	Rhys Lloyd tackled in end zone for a safety by	16	20
"TOP" = time of possession. For other American football terms, see Glossary of American football.							16	20
