= 1999 Minnesota Golden Gophers football team =

American college football season

1999 Minnesota Golden Gophers football

Sun Bowl, L 20–24 vs. Oregon
- Conference: Big Ten Conference

Ranking
- Coaches: No. 17
- AP: No. 18
- Record: 8–4 (5–3 Big Ten)
- Head coach: Glen Mason (3rd season)
- Offensive coordinator: Steve Loney (2nd season)
- Defensive coordinator: David Gibbs (3rd season)
- Captains: Tyrone Carter; Billy Cockerham; Ben Hamilton
- Home stadium: Hubert H. Humphrey Metrodome

1999 Big Ten Conference football standings
	Conf.			Overall
Team	W		L	W		L
No. 4 Wisconsin $	7	–	1	10	–	2
No. 7 Michigan State	6	–	2	10	–	2
No. 5 Michigan %	6	–	2	10	–	2
No. 11 Penn State	5	–	3	10	–	3
No. 18 Minnesota	5	–	3	8	–	4
No. 24 Illinois	4	–	4	8	–	4
No. 25 Purdue	4	–	4	7	–	5
Ohio State	3	–	5	6	–	6
Indiana	3	–	5	4	–	7
Northwestern	1	–	7	3	–	8
Iowa	0	–	8	1	–	10
$ – BCS representative as conference champion; % – BCS at-large representative; Rankings from AP Poll

The 1999 Minnesota Golden Gophers football team represented the University of Minnesota as a member of the Big Ten Conference during the 1999 NCAA Division I-A football season. In their third year under head coach Glen Mason, the Golden Gophers compiled an overall record of 8–4 with a mark of 5–3 in conference play, tying for fourth place in the Big Ten, record and outscored opponents 368 to 196. Acheving a winning record for the first time since 1990, Minnesota was invited to the Sun Bowl, their first bowl game since 1986, where the Golden Gophers lost to Oregon. The team was ranked No. 17 and No 18 in the final Coaches Poll and AP poll, respectively.

Tyrone Carter was named an All-American by the Walter Camp Football Foundation, Associated Press, The Sporting News, Sportsline.com, American Football Coaches Association, College Football News and Football Writers Association of America. Carter, center Ben Hamilton, running back Thomas Hamner and defensive end Karon Riley were named All-Big Ten first team. Defensive tackle John Schlecht and corner back Willie Middlebrooks were named All-Big Ten second team. Carter was awarded the Jim Thorpe Award, given to the best defensive back in the country. Offensive lineman Akeem Akinwale, linebacker Luke Braaten, Free Safety Jack Brewer, offensive lineman Derek Burns, defensive end Mike Cernoch, punter Preston Gruening, Linebacker Justin Hall, wide receiver Ron Johnson, defensive end Astein Osei, full back Brad Prigge, long snapper Derek Rackley, defensive tackle Dave Sykora and tight end Zach Vevea were named Academic All-Big Ten.

Total attendance for the season was 318,086, which averaged out to 45,441 per game. The season high for attendance was against rival Wisconsin.

== Schedule ==
Date	Time	Opponent	Rank	Site	TV	Result	Attendance	Source
September 4	11:00 am	Ohio*		Hubert H. Humphrey Metrodome; Minneapolis, MN	MSC	W 33–7	35,552	
September 11	7:00 pm	Louisiana–Monroe*		Hubert H. Humphrey Metrodome; Minneapolis, MN	MSC	W 35–0	38,137	
September 18	1:30 pm	Illinois State*		Hubert H. Humphrey Metrodome; Minneapolis, MN		W 55–7	33,726	
October 2	11:00 am	at Northwestern		Ryan Field; Evanston, IL		W 33–14	24,439	
October 9	11:00 am	No. 20 Wisconsin	No. 25	Hubert H. Humphrey Metrodome; Minneapolis, MN (rivalry)	ESPN Plus	L 17–20 ^{OT}	63,108	
October 16	11:00 am	at Illinois		Memorial Stadium; Champaign, IL	ESPN2	W 37–7	49,152	
October 23	11:00 am	No. 22 Ohio State	No. 24	Hubert H. Humphrey Metrodome; Minneapolis, MN	ESPN	L 17–20	50,842	
October 30	11:00 am	No. 18 Purdue		Hubert H. Humphrey Metrodome; Minneapolis, MN	ESPN	L 28–33	48,869	
November 6	11:00 am	at No. 2 Penn State		Beaver Stadium; University Park, PA (Governor's Victory Bell)	ESPN2	W 24–23	96,753	
November 13	11:00 am	Indiana	No. 20	Hubert H. Humphrey Metrodome; Minneapolis, MN	ESPN Plus	W 44–20	47,852	
November 20	11:00 am	at Iowa	No. 17	Kinnick Stadium; Iowa City, IA (rivalry)	ESPN Plus	W 25–21	55,386	
December 31	1:00 pm	vs. Oregon*	No. 12	Sun Bowl; El Paso, TX (Sun Bowl)	CBS	L 20–24	48,757	
*Non-conference game; Rankings from AP Poll released prior to the game; All times are in Central time

== Rankings ==
Ranking movements Legend: ██ Increase in ranking ██ Decrease in ranking — = Not ranked RV = Received votes
	Week																
Poll	Pre	1	2	3	4	5	6	7	8	9	10	11	12	13	14	15	Final
AP	—	—	—	—	—	RV	25	—	24	—	—	20	17	13	13	12	18
Coaches	—	—	—	—	—	RV	RV	—	25	RV	—	21	18	14	13	12	17
BCS	Not released									—	—	—	—	14	14	13	Not released

== Roster ==
1999 Minnesota Golden Gophers football team roster
Players
Coaches
Offense

Pos.	#	Name	Class
QB	8	Asad Abdul-Khaliq	Fr
WR	23	Arland Bruce	Sr
QB	5	Billy Cockerham	Sr
OT	74	Adam Haayer	Jr
G	55	Ben Hamilton	Jr
RB	12	Thomas Hamner	Sr
G	77	Pat Hau	Sr
WR	3	Ron Johnson	So
WR	7	Luke Leverson	Sr

Defense

Pos.	#	Name	Class
DE	99	Matt Anderle	So
FS	2	Jack Brewer	So
SS	22	Tyrone Carter	Sr
CB	39	Michael Lehan	Fr
CB	42	Willie Middlebrooks	So
DE	91	Karon Riley	Jr
DT	93	John Schlecht	Jr
CB	30	Jimmy Wyrick	Sr

Special teams

Pos.	#	Name	Class
LS	18	Derek Rackley	Sr
P	35	Ryan Rindels	Sr

Head coach

- Glen Mason

Coordinators/assistant coaches

Legend

- (C) Team captain
- (S) Suspended
- (I) Ineligible
- Injured
- Redshirt
