= 2003 Sun Bowl =

American college football game

2003 Wells Fargo Sun Bowl
- 70th Sun Bowl
| Oregon Ducks | Minnesota Golden Gophers |
| (8–4) | (9–3) |
| Pac-10 | Big Ten |
| 30 | 31 |
| Head coach: Mike Bellotti | Head coach: Glen Mason |
| | AP / Coaches / BCS; 24 / 20 / 25 |
| | 1 | 2 | 3 | 4 | Total |
|---|---|---|---|---|---|
| Oregon | 0 | 17 | 7 | 6 | 30 |
| Minnesota | 0 | 14 | 14 | 3 | 31 |
- Date: December 31, 2003
- Season: 2003
- Stadium: Sun Bowl
- Location: El Paso, Texas
- Referee: Steve Shaw (SEC)
- Payout: US$1.45 million per team

United States TV coverage
- Network: CBS
- Announcers: Verne Lundquist, Todd Blackledge and Jill Arrington

The 2003 Wells Fargo Sun Bowl featured the Oregon Ducks and the Minnesota Golden Gophers, a rematch of the 1999 Sun Bowl.

After a scoreless first quarter, Oregon quarterback Kellen Clemens passed to wide receiver Dante Rosario for a 19-yard touchdown pass, giving Oregon an early 7–0 lead. Minnesota used its power running game to answer back, as they pounded the ball down the field, and capped off the drive with a 1-yard run by fullback Thomas Tapeh, knotting the game at 7–7. Samie Parker, who had a monster game with over 200 yards receiving, caught an 18-yarder from Clemens, putting Oregon up 14–7.

Minnesota continued to use its running game, and Tapeh rushed for his second 1-yarder of the game, again tying the game at 14. Jared Siegel's 30-yard field goal before halftime gave the Ducks a 17–14 half-time lead. In the third quarter Tapeh recorded his third rushing touchdown of the game, with a 6-yarder, giving Minnesota its first lead at 21–17.

Oregon responded by Samie Parker catching his second touchdown reception of the game, a 40-yarder from Clemens, his third touchdown pass of the game, and Oregon reclaimed the lead 24–21. Lawrence Maroney rushed for a 22-yard touchdown later in the quarter giving Minnesota a 28–24 lead.

In the fourth quarter, Jared Siegel connected on a 32-yard field goal to pull Oregon to within 28–27. His last field goal, a 47-yarder with less than 5 minutes left in the game, gave Oregon a 30–28 lead. Minnesota's kicker, Rhys Lloyd, kicked a 42-yard field goal with 23 seconds left, giving Minnesota a 31–30 win.
