= Glen Mason =

American football player and coach (born 1950)

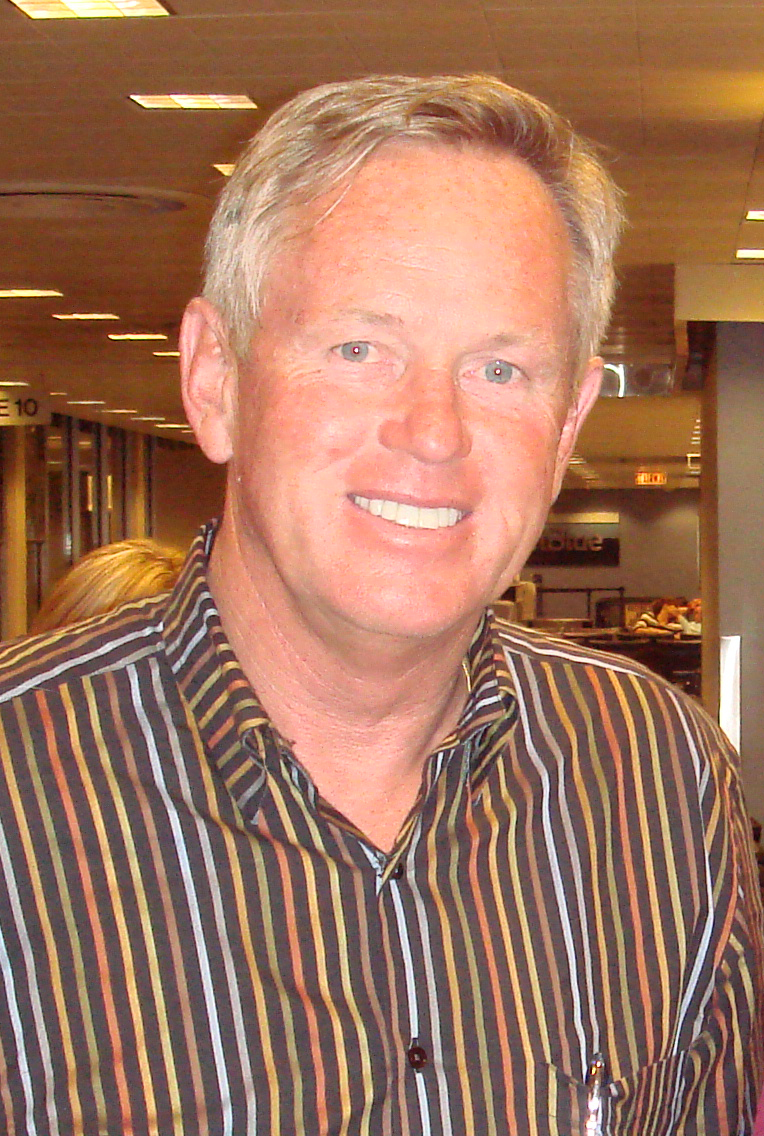

Biographical details
- Born: April 9, 1950 (age 76); Colonia, New Jersey, U.S.

Playing career
- 1970–1971: Ohio State
- Position: Linebacker

Coaching career (HC unless noted)
- 1972: Ball State (GA)
- 1973: Allegheny (DC)
- 1974: Ball State (DL)
- 1975–1976: Iowa State (OL/TE)
- 1977: Illinois (OL)
- 1978–1979: Ohio State (OL/LB)
- 1980–1985: Ohio State (OC)
- 1986–1987: Kent State
- 1988–1996: Kansas
- 1997–2006: Minnesota

Head coaching record
- Overall: 123–121–1
- Bowls: 5–4

Accomplishments and honors

Awards
- MAC Coach of the Year (1986); 2× Big Eight Coach of the Year (1991, 1995); Big Ten Coach of the Year (1999)

Glen Orin Mason (born April 9, 1950) is an American former college football player and coach. Mason served as the head football coach at Kent State University from 1986 to 1987, the University of Kansas from 1988 to 1996, and the University of Minnesota from 1997 to 2006, compiling a career head coaching record of 123–121–1.

== Early life and playing career ==
Raised in Woodbridge Township, New Jersey, Mason attended Colonia High School.

Mason played college football at Ohio State University, graduating in 1972 with a B.A. in education. He was a linebacker on the depth chart behind Randy Gradishar, Stan White, Vic Koegel, Arnie Jones, and Rick Middleton.

== Coaching career ==
Mason served as an assistant coach at Ball State University, Allegheny College, Iowa State University, the University of Illinois at Urbana-Champaign, and Ohio State University. He served as the outside linebackers coach and the offensive line coach at Ohio State in 1978 and 1979. In 1980, he was promoted to offensive coordinator of the Buckeyes and remained in that position through the 1985 season.

Mason was head coach for Kent State University in 1986 and 1987 and the University of Kansas from 1988 to 1996. On December 18, 1995, as Kansas prepared for the Aloha Bowl against UCLA, Mason accepted the head coaching position at the University of Georgia. However, owing to a recent divorce and wanting to stay close to his children, Mason had a change of heart and stayed with the Jayhawks on December 25. He received a raise but left for the University of Minnesota one season later. His first game with Minnesota in 1997 was against Hawaii, at Aloha Stadium, Minnesota lost the game, 17–3.

In January 2002, Mason was named the president of the American Football Coaches Association. He was the third Minnesota coach to be awarded this honor joining Bernie Bierman (1935) and Murray Warmath (1968). On December 31, 2006, Minnesota fired Mason immediately following the Gophers' 44–41 overtime loss to Texas Tech in the 2006 Insight Bowl, a game in which the Gophers blew a 38–7 third-quarter lead. At the end of the 2006 season, he had a career record of 123–121–1.

Following his tenure at Minnesota, Mason became a college football analyst and broadcaster for the Big Ten Network.

== Personal ==
Mason has two children and lives in the suburbs of Minneapolis.

== Head coaching record ==
Year	Team	Overall	Conference	Standing	Bowl/playoffs	Coaches^{#}	AP^{°}
Kent State Golden Flashes (Mid-American Conference) (1986–1987)
1986	Kent State	5–6	5–3	T–2nd			
1987	Kent State	7–4	5–3	T–2nd			
Kent State:		12–10	10–6				
Kansas Jayhawks (Big Eight Conference) (1988–1995)
1988	Kansas	1–10	1–6	7th			
1989	Kansas	4–7	2–5	6th			
1990	Kansas	3–7–1	2–4–1	T–4th			
1991	Kansas	6–5	3–4	5th			
1992	Kansas	8–4	4–3	T–3rd	W Aloha	23	22
1993	Kansas	5–7	3–4	5th			
1994	Kansas	6–5	3–4	5th			
1995	Kansas	10–2	5–2	T–2nd	W Aloha	10	9
Kansas Jayhawks (Big 12 Conference) (1996)
1996	Kansas	4–7	2–6	5th (North)			
Kansas:		47–54–1	25–38–1				
Minnesota Golden Gophers (Big Ten Conference) (1997–2006)
1997	Minnesota	3–9	1–7	T–9th			
1998	Minnesota	5–6	2–6	T–7th			
1999	Minnesota	8–4	5–3	T–4th	L Sun	17	18
2000	Minnesota	6–6	4–4	T–5th	L MicronPC.com		
2001	Minnesota	4–7	2–6	T–10th			
2002	Minnesota	8–5	3–5	7th	W Music City		
2003	Minnesota	10–3	5–3	T–4th	W Sun	17	20
2004	Minnesota	7–5	3–5	8th	W Music City		
2005	Minnesota	7–5	4–4	7th	L Music City		
2006	Minnesota	6–7	3–5	T–6th	L Insight		
Minnesota:		64–57	32–48				
Total:		123–121–1					
^{#}Rankings from final Coaches Poll.; ^{°}Rankings from final AP Poll.

== See also ==
- List of presidents of the American Football Coaches Association
