= 1999 Oregon Ducks football team =

American college football season

1999 Oregon Ducks football

Sun Bowl champion

Sun Bowl, W 24–20 vs. Minnesota
- Conference: Pacific-10 Conference

Ranking
- Coaches: No. 18
- AP: No. 19
- Record: 9–3 (6–2 Pac-10)
- Head coach: Mike Bellotti (5th season)
- Offensive coordinator: Jeff Tedford (2nd season)
- Offensive scheme: Pro-style
- Defensive coordinator: Nick Aliotti (3rd season)
- Base defense: 4–3
- Captain: Game captains
- Home stadium: Autzen Stadium

1999 Pacific-10 Conference football standings
	Conf.			Overall
Team	W		L	W		L
Stanford $	7	–	1	8	–	4
No. 19 Oregon	6	–	2	9	–	3
Washington	6	–	2	7	–	5
Arizona State	5	–	3	6	–	6
Oregon State	4	–	4	7	–	5
Arizona	3	–	5	6	–	6
USC	3	–	5	6	–	6
California	3	–	5	4	–	7
UCLA	2	–	6	4	–	7
Washington State	1	–	7	3	–	9
$ – BCS representative as conference champion; Cal later vacated 4 wins (3 in conference) due to NCAA sanctions.; Rankings from AP Poll

The 1999 Oregon Ducks football team represented the University of Oregon as a member of the Pacific-10 Conference (Pac-10) during the 1999 NCAA Division I-A football season. Led by fifth-year head coach Mike Bellotti, the Ducks compiled an overall record of 9–3 with a mark of 6–2 in conference play, tying for second place in the Pac-10. Oregon was invited to the Sun Bowl, where the Ducks beat Minnesota. The team played home games at Autzen Stadium in Eugene, Oregon.

== Schedule ==
Date	Time	Opponent	Rank	Site	TV	Result	Attendance	Source
September 2	5:00 pm	at Michigan State*		Spartan Stadium; East Lansing, MI	ESPN	L 20–27	72,923	
September 11	1:00 pm	UTEP*		Autzen Stadium; Eugene, OR	OSN	W 47–28	40,938	
September 18	2:00 pm	Nevada*		Autzen Stadium; Eugene, OR		W 72–10	41,374	
September 25	7:15 pm	No. 16 USC		Autzen Stadium; Eugene, OR (rivalry)	FSN	W 33–30 ^{3OT}	45,660	
October 2	7:15 pm	at Washington	No. 25	Husky Stadium; Seattle, WA (rivalry)	FSN	L 20–34	72,581	
October 9	7:15 pm	at UCLA		Rose Bowl; Pasadena, CA	FSN	L 29–34	55,674	
October 23	7:15 pm	at Arizona		Arizona Stadium; Tucson, AZ	FSN	W 44–41	55,251	
October 30	3:30 pm	Arizona State^{†}		Auzten Stadium; Eugene, OR		W 20–17	45,445	
November 6	7:00 pm	Washington State		Autzen Stadium; Eugene, OR	FSNNW	W 52–10	44,090	
November 13	12:30 pm	at California		California Memorial Stadium; Berkeley, CA		W 24–19	38,000	
November 20	3:30 pm	Oregon State		Autzen Stadium; Eugene, OR (Civil War)	FSN	W 25–14	46,115	
December 31	11:15 am	vs. No. 12 Minnesota*		Sun Bowl; El Paso, TX (Sun Bowl)	CBS	W 24–20	48,757	
*Non-conference game; ^{†}Homecoming; Rankings from AP Poll released prior to the game; All times are in Pacific time

== Rankings ==
Ranking movements Legend: ██ Increase in ranking ██ Decrease in ranking — = Not ranked RV = Received votes
	Week																
Poll	Pre	1	2	3	4	5	6	7	8	9	10	11	12	13	14	15	Final
AP	RV	—	—	—	RV	25	—	—	—	—	RV	RV	RV	RV	RV	RV	19
Coaches Poll	RV	RV*	—	—	—	RV	—	—	—	—	—	—	RV	RV	RV	RV	18
BCS	Not released									—	—	—	—	—	—	—	Not released

== Roster ==
1999 Oregon Ducks football team roster
Players
Coaches
Offense

Pos.	#	Name	Class
QB	3	Joey Harrington	Jr
QB	7	A. J. Feeley	Sr
RB	22	Reuben Droughns	Sr
WR	82	Sonny Cook	So
TE	84	Justin Peelle	So
TE	85	Danny Pulido	So

Defense

Pos.	#	Name	Class
LB	44	Peter Sirmon	Sr

Special teams

Pos.	#	Name	Class

Head coach

- Mike Bellotti

Coordinators/assistant coaches

Legend

- (C) Team captain
- (S) Suspended
- (I) Ineligible
- Injured
- Redshirt

Roster
Last update: 1999-10-05

== Game summaries ==
=== USC ===
Team	1	2	3	4	OT	2OT	3OT	Total
USC	7	3	0	13	0	7	0	30
• Oregon	10	0	10	3	0	7	3	33

- Date: September 25
- Location: Autzen Stadium
- Game attendance: 45,660

Scoring summary
1	USC	Chad Morton 1 yard run (David Newbury kick)	USC 7–0
1	ORE	Nathan Villegas 46 yard field goal	USC 7–3
1	ORE	Enyi Nwamuo 1 yard pass from A.J. Feeley (Nathan Villegas kick)	ORE 10–7
2	USC	David Newbury 29 yard field goal	Tie 10–10
3	ORE	Nathan Villegas 19 yard field goal	ORE 13–10
3	ORE	Herman Ho Ching 10 yard pass from A.J. Feeley (Nathan Villegas kick)	ORE 20–10
4	USC	Chad Morton 2 yard run (David Newbury kick)	ORE 20–17
4	USC	Chad Morton 1 yard run (kick failed)	USC 23–20
4	ORE	Nathan Villegas 26 yard field goal	Tie 23–23
2OT	ORE	Todd Brooks 1 yard pass from A.J. Feeley (Josh Frankel kick)	ORE 30–23
2OT	USC	R. Jay Soward 4 yard pass from Mike Van Raaphorst (David Newbury kick)	Tie 30–30
3OT	ORE	Josh Frankel 27 yard field goal	ORE 33–30

=== Oregon State ===
Team	1	2	3	4	Total
Oregon St	0	0	6	8	14
• Oregon	3	13	6	3	25

- Date: November 20
- Location: Autzen Stadium

Scoring summary
Q1	ORE	Villegas 33 yard field goal	ORE 3–0
Q2	ORE	Villegas 22 yard field goal	ORE 6–0
Q2	ORE	Villegas 23 yard field goal	ORE 9–0
Q2	ORE	Droughns 26 yard run (Villegas kick)	ORE 16–0
Q3	ORE	Harrington 5 yard run (two-point conversion failed)	ORE 22–0
Q3	ORST	Simonton 5 yard run (two-point conversion failed)	ORE 22–6
Q4	ORST	Simonton 2 yard run (Simonton run)	ORE 22–14
Q4	ORE	Villegas 20 yard field goal	ORE 25–14
