= 2000 MicronPC.com Bowl =

American college football game

Minnesota Golden Gophers	NC State Wolfpack
(6–5)	(7–4)
Big Ten	ACC
30	38
Head coach: Glen Mason	Head coach: Chuck Amato
	1	2	3	4	Total
Minnesota	21	3	0	6	30
NC State	0	8	17	13	38
- Date: December 28, 2000
- Season: 2000
- Stadium: Pro Player Stadium
- Location: Miami Gardens, Florida
- MVP: QB Philip Rivers (NC State)
- Referee: Jack Cramer (Big East)
- Attendance: 28,359
- Payout: US$750,000 per team

United States TV coverage
- Network: TBS
- Announcers: Kevin Harlan, Dave Rowe, and Craig Sager

The 2000 MicronPC.com Bowl was a post-season American college football bowl game at Pro Player Stadium in Miami Gardens, Florida, between the Minnesota Golden Gophers and the North Carolina State Wolfpack. This was the 11th edition of the bowl originally known as the Blockbuster Bowl, and the third (and final) edition sponsored by MicronPC.

== Game summary ==
- Minnesota - Redmon 12-yard touchdown run (Nystrom kick), 13:03
- Minnesota - Redmon 3-yard touchdown run (Nystrom kick), 4:46
- Minnesota - Cole 2-yard touchdown run (Nystrom kick), 0:45
- Minnesota - Nystrom 27-yard field goal, 7:31
- North Carolina State - Vanderveer 2-yard touchdown pass from Rivers (R. Robinson pass from Rivers), 2:00
- North Carolina State - K. Robinson 19-yard touchdown pass from Rivers (Leak pass from Rivers), 12:08
- North Carolina State - Passingham 37-yard field goal, 8:00
- North Carolina State - R. Robinson 3-yard touchdown run (pass failed), 0:42
- Minnesota - Nystrom 23-yard field goal, 11:57
- North Carolina State - K. Robinson 23-yard touchdown pass from Rivers (pass failed), 11:01
- Minnesota - Nystrom 29-yard field goal, 6:46
- North Carolina State - R. Robinson 8-yard touchdown run (Passingham kick), 3:1

Minnesota got off to a very quick start in the first quarter scoring 21 points by way of three touchdowns, two of them from running back Tellis Redmon. The Gophers would then add a field goal to that total before NC State got on the board with a 2-yard pass and two-point conversion from freshman quarterback Philip Rivers to make the score 24–8 going into halftime.

The Wolfpack stormed out of the break with 17 unanswered points, aided by a blocked punt, to take the lead 25–24 at the end of the 3rd quarter. Minnesota came back with a field goal, but NC State took the lead for good on a 23-yard touchdown pass to Koren Robinson to make it 31–27. After adding another field goal, the Gophers had one last chance with a late possession to win the game, but quarterback Travis Cole fumbled deep in his own territory to set up an easy NC State touchdown for a final score of 38–30.

== Statistics ==
Statistics	Minnesota	NC State
First downs	31	22
Yards rushing	300	109
Yards passing	202	310
Total Offense	502	419
Passing (C-A-I)	16-30-1	24–39–2
Kickoff Return Yards	48	172
Punt Return Yards	18	23
Fumbles-Lost	2-1	2–0
Penalties-Yards	14-107	7-75
