= 1999 Sun Bowl =

American college football game

1999 Wells Fargo Sun Bowl
Minnesota Golden Gophers	Oregon Ducks
(8–3)	(8–3)
Big Ten	Pac-10
20	24
Head coach: Glen Mason	Head coach: Mike Bellotti
AP / Coaches / BCS; 12 / 12 / 13
	1	2	3	4	Total
Minnesota	7	0	6	7	20
Oregon	0	7	10	7	24
- Date: December 31, 1999
- Season: 1999
- Stadium: Sun Bowl
- Location: El Paso, Texas
- MVP: Billy Cockerham (QB, Minnesota)
- Referee: Frank White (WAC)
- Payout: US$1,000,000 per team

United States TV coverage
- Network: CBS
- Announcers: Sean McDonough, Todd Blackledge, and Michele Tafoya

The 1999 Wells Fargo Sun Bowl featured the Oregon Ducks and the Minnesota Golden Gophers. The Golden Gophers were making their first bowl appearance since 1986.

== Game summary ==
- Minnesota – Johnson 1 yard touchdown pass from Cockerham (Nystrom kick), 3:52
- Oregon – Harrington 5 yard touchdown run (Villegas kick), 1:11
- Minnesota – Bruce 38 yard touchdown pass from Cockerham (Nystrom kick failed), 12:42
- Oregon – Harrington 1 yard touchdown run (Villegas kick), 8:04
- Oregon – Villegas 37 yard field goal, 3:11
- Minnesota – Johnson 7 yard touchdown pass from Cockerham (Nystrom kick), 14:56
- Oregon – Howry 1 yard touchdown run

Minnesota opened the scoring with an 18-yard touchdown pass from quarterback Billy Cockerham to wide receiver Ron Johnson for a 7–0 1st quarter lead. Oregon quarterback Joey Harrington notched the equalizer when he rushed five yards for a touchdown, tying the game at 7.

In the third quarter, Cockerham fired a 38-yard touchdown pass to Arland Bruce for a 13–7 Minnesota lead. Harrington scored on a 1- yard quarterback sneak, to give Oregon a 14–13 lead. Nathan Villegas kicked a 37-yard field goal to make it 17–13. In the fourth quarter, Cockerham again found Ron Johnson for a 7-yard touchdown, and a 20–17 lead. Harrington found wide receiver Keenan Howry for a 10-yard touchdown pass and a 24–20 lead. Oregon held on and won the game.

The game's three MVP awards (overall, lineman, and special teams) were each awarded to Minnesota players, despite Oregon winning the game, due (at least in part) to media members having to cast their ballots with five minutes left in the game.

== Statistics ==
Statistics	Minnesota	Oregon
First downs	19	22
Rush Att.-Yds.	35–96	39–156
Passing yards	257	232
Passes (A-C-I)	37–19–2	43–20–0
Total Net Yards	353	388
Kickoff ret. (No.-Yds.)	3–67	4–80
Punt ret. (No.-Yds.)	3–20	4–40
Penalties–yards	5–58	4–25
Fumbles–lost	1–1	2–1
