= 1996 Wisconsin Badgers football team =

American college football season

1996 Wisconsin Badgers football

Copper Bowl champion

Copper Bowl, W 38–10 vs. Utah
- Conference: Big Ten Conference
- Record: 8–5 (3–5 Big Ten)
- Head coach: Barry Alvarez (7th season)
- Offensive coordinator: Brad Childress (5th season)
- Offensive scheme: Smashmouth
- Defensive coordinator: Kevin Cosgrove (2nd season)
- Base defense: 4–3
- MVP: Pete Monty
- Captains: Daryl Carter; Cayetano Castro; Pete Monty; Tarek Saleh; Jamie Vanderveldt; Jerry Wunsch
- Home stadium: Camp Randall Stadium

1996 Big Ten Conference football standings
	Conf.			Overall
Team	W		L	W		L
No. 2 Ohio State +	7	–	1	11	–	1
No. 15 Northwestern +	7	–	1	9	–	3
No. 7 Penn State	6	–	2	11	–	2
No. 18 Iowa	6	–	2	9	–	3
No. 20 Michigan	5	–	3	8	–	4
Michigan State	5	–	3	6	–	6
Wisconsin	3	–	5	8	–	5
Purdue	2	–	6	3	–	8
Minnesota	1	–	7	4	–	7
Indiana	1	–	7	3	–	8
Illinois	1	–	7	2	–	9
+ – Conference co-champions; Rankings from AP Poll

The 1996 Wisconsin Badgers football team was an American football team that represented the University of Wisconsin–Madison as a member of the Big Ten Conference during the 1996 NCAA Division I-A football season. In their seventh year under head coach Barry Alvarez, the Badgers compiled an 8–5 record (3–5 in conference games), finished in seventh place in the Big Ten, and outscored opponents by a total of 339 to 233. Against ranked opponents, they lost to No. 3 Penn State, No. 2 Ohio State, and No. 14 Northwestern. They concluded the season with a victory over Utah in the Copper Bowl. The Badgers were unranked in the final AP and Coaches polls.

The team's statistical leaders for all games, including bowl game, were quarterback Mike Samuel (1,752 passing yards, 58.27% completion percentage), running back Ron Dayne (2,109 rushing yards, 6.5 yards per carry, 126 points scored), wide receiver Donald Hayes (44 receptions for 629 yards), and linebacker Pete Monty (85 solo tackles, 149 total tackles. Monty won the team's most valuable player award. Defensive lineman Tarek Saleh received first-team honors from the Football News on the 1996 All-America team. Four Badgers received first-team honors from the coaches or media on the 1996 All-Big Ten Conference football team: Dayne (Coaches-1, Media-1); Saleh (Coaches-1, Media-1); Monty (Coaches-1 [tie]; Media-2); and guard Jamie Vanderveldt (Media-1).

The team played its home games at Camp Randall Stadium in Madison, Wisconsin.

== Schedule ==
Date	Time	Opponent	Site	TV	Result	Attendance
September 7	11:30 a.m.	Eastern Michigan*	Camp Randall Stadium; Madison, WI	ESPN2	W 24–3	74,279
September 14	9:00 p.m.	at UNLV*	Sam Boyd Stadium; Whitney, NV		W 52–17	40,091
September 21	11:30 a.m.	Stanford*	Camp Randall Stadium; Madison, WI	ESPN2	W 14–0	77,894
September 28	2:30 p.m.	No. 3 Penn State	Camp Randall Stadium; Madison, WI	ABC	L 20–23	79,607
October 12	2:30 p.m.	at No. 2 Ohio State	Ohio Stadium; Columbus, OH	ABC	L 14–17	94,215
October 19	11:30 a.m.	No. 14 Northwestern^{†}	Camp Randall Stadium; Madison, WI	ESPN	L 30–34	79,576
October 26	11:30 a.m.	at Michigan State	Spartan Stadium; East Lansing, MI	ESPN2	L 13–30	69,217
November 2	11:30 a.m.	Purdue	Camp Randall Stadium; Madison, WI	ESPN	W 33–25	78,330
November 9	11:00 a.m.	Minnesota	Camp Randall Stadium; Madison, WI (rivalry)	ESPN Plus	W 45–28	78,006
November 16	11:30 a.m.	at Iowa	Kinnick Stadium; Iowa City, IA (rivalry)	ESPN	L 0–31	66,570
November 23	1:00 p.m.	at Illinois	Memorial Stadium; Champaign, IL		W 35–15	37,814
November 30	11:00 p.m.	at Hawaii*	Aloha Stadium; Halawa, HI		W 59–10	26,819
December 27	8:00 p.m.	vs. Utah*	Arizona Stadium; Tucson, AZ (Copper Bowl)	ESPN	W 38–10	42,122
*Non-conference game; ^{†}Homecoming; Rankings from AP Poll released prior to the game; All times are in Central time

== Season summary ==
Wisconsin started off quickly in 1996, winning their first three games against Eastern Michigan, UNLV, and Stanford. However, the Badgers then encountered far stiffer opposition against Penn State, Ohio State, Northwestern, and Michigan State. In the Northwestern game, Wisconsin RB Ron Dayne stunningly fumbled with just under a minute remaining. Northwestern recovered and scored the winning touchdown, sealing Wisconsin's third consecutive loss. The Badgers lost their fourth straight game the next week, falling 30–13 to Michigan State.

The Badgers snapped their four-game losing streak with consecutive wins against Purdue and rival Minnesota, before suffering a humiliating 31–0 loss at the hands of Hayden Fry's Iowa Hawkeyes. After falling to 5–5, the Badgers would win the final games on their regular season slate by beating Illinois and Hawaii, earning a bid to the Copper Bowl. The Badgers defeated the Utah Utes 38–10 in the 1996 Copper Bowl.

Wisconsin RB Ron Dayne ran for over 2,000 yards and 21 touchdowns in the 1996 season, earning Big Ten Freshman of the Year Honors in the process.

== Personnel ==
=== Roster ===
1996 Wisconsin Badgers football team roster
Players
Coaches
Offense

Pos.	#	Name	Class
WR	17	Willie Austin	Fr
WR	88	Demetrius Brown	Fr
FB	32	Branden Cantrell	Jr
G	68	Cayetano Castro (C)	Sr
OT	64	James Darby	Sr
RB	33	Ron Dayne	Fr
C	69	Derek Engler	Sr
G	59	Mike Galletti	Sr
OT	79	Aaron Gibson	So
TE	89	Eric Grams	So
WR	84	Donald Hayes	Jr
QB	12	Scott Kavanagh	Fr
TE	9	Kevin Lyles	Sr
FB	37	Cecil Martin	So
RB	13	Carl McCullough	Jr
OT	75	Chris McIntosh	Fr
WR	1	Ahmad Merritt	Fr
C	56	Mike Rader	Sr
QB	10	Mike Samuel	So
WR	82	Tony Simmons	Jr
TE	49	Ryan Sondrup	So
QB	18	Dirk Stanger	Jr
RB	43	Aaron Stecker	So
OL	77	Joe Steffen	Sr
G	65	Jamie Vanderveldt (C)	Sr
FB	41	John Waerig	So
RB	22	Charles Williams	Fr
OT	71	Jerry Wunsch (C)	Sr

Defense

Pos.	#	Name	Class
S	29	Bob Adamov	So
S	45	Giscard Bernard	Sr
DB	3	Onjai Bryant	Jr
DT	74	Tom Burke	So
CB	38	Lamar Campbell	Jr
DE	25	Marcus Carpenter	Fr
LB	19	Daryl Carter (C)	Sr
DE	36	Azree Commander	Sr
DE	99	Dave Cruickshank	So
LB	96	Pete Diatelevi	Sr
LB	55	Brian Flanigan	Jr
LB	16	Chris Ghidorzi	Fr
DB	22	Trent Gross	Jr
S	6	Kevin Huntley	Jr
DT	59	Joe Innis	Jr
DT	58	Chris Janek	Fr
DE	85	Bryan Jurewicz	Sr
LB	57	David Lysek	Jr
DT	94	Neil Miklusak	Sr
LB	48	Pete Monty (C)	Sr
S	26	Bobby Myers	Fr
S	15	Tim Rosga	Fr
DE	42	Tarek Saleh (C)	Sr
DT	91	Rod Spiller	Sr
CB	28	Jason Suttle	Jr
CB	34	Leonard Taylor	So
CB	33	Scott Wagner	Jr
CB	7	Cyrill Weems	Sr
DT	92	Brian Williams	So
S	21	Tony Williams	Fr

Special teams

Pos.	#	Name	Class
K, P	14	John Hall	Sr
LS	46	Mike Schneck	Fr
P	23	Eric Skrzypchak	Fr

Head coach

- Barry Alvarez

Coordinators/assistant coaches

- Brad Childress – Offensive coordinator/quarterbacks
- Kevin Cosgrove – Defensive coordinator/inside linebackers
- Mike Cassity – Defensive backs
- Jay Hayes – Outside linebackers/special teams
- Jim Hueber – Offensive line
- Henry Mason – Wide receivers
- John Palermo – Assistant Head Coach/defensive line
- Brian White – Running backs
- Bernie Wyatt – Tight ends/recruiting coordinator

Legend

- (C) Team captain
- (S) Suspended
- (I) Ineligible
- Injured
- Redshirt

Roster

=== Regular starters ===
Position	Player
Quarterback	Mike Samuel
Running back	Ron Dayne
Fullback	Cecil Martin / Aaron Gibson
Wide receiver	Donald Hayes
Wide receiver	Tony Simmons
Tight end	Kevin Lyles
Left tackle	Chris McIntosh
Left guard	Jamie Vanderveldt
Center	Derek Engler
Right guard	Cayetano Castro
Right tackle	Jerry Wunsch

Position	Player
Defensive end	Tarek Saleh
Defensive tackle	Neil Miklusak
Defensive tackle	Rod Spiller
Defensive end	Bryan Jurewicz
Outside linebacker	Daryl Carter
Inside linebacker	Pete Monty
Outside linebacker	David Lysek
Cornerback	Cyrill Weems
Free safety	Kevin Huntley
Strong safety	Bob Adamov
Cornerback	Jason Suttle

== Wisconsin players selected in the 1997 NFL draft ==
Player	Position	Round	Overall Selection	NFL team
Jerry Wunsch	Guard	2	37	Tampa Bay Buccaneers
Pete Monty	Linebacker	4	103	New York Giants
Tarek Saleh	Linebacker	4	122	Carolina Panthers
