= William Carr (arena football) =

American football player and coach (born 1975)

No. 97
- Positions: Defensive lineman, offensive lineman

Personal information
- Born: January 13, 1975 (age 51); Dallas, Texas, U.S.

Career information
- High school: Carter (Dallas, Texas)
- College: Michigan
- NFL draft: 1997: 7th round, 217th overall pick

Career history

Playing
- Cincinnati Bengals (1997)*; Carolina Panthers (1997)*; Orlando Predators (1999); Barcelona Dragons (2000); Atlanta Falcons (2000–2001)*; Georgia Force (2003–2004); Grand Rapids Rampage (2005); Orlando Predators (2005)
- * Offseason or practice squad member only

Coaching
- Arizona Western (2012–2013) Defensive line coach; Michigan (2014–2015) Assistant defensive line coach; Texas (2016) Defensive analyst; Morgan State (2017) Defensive line coach; Alabama A&M (2018) Recruiting coordinator & defensive line coach; Morgan State (2019–2022) Associate head coach, run game coordinator, & defensive line coach

Awards and highlights
- Second-team All-American (1996); First-team All-Big Ten (1996); Second-team All-Big Ten (1995)

Career AFL statistics
- Tackles: 46
- Sacks: 8.5
- FF: 2
- Stats at ArenaFan.com

William Carr (born July 13, 1975) is an American former professional football defensive / offensive lineman who played in the Arena Football League (AFL). He played college football at Michigan. He was drafted by the Cincinnati Bengals in the 7th round (217th overall) of the 1997 NFL draft.

== College career ==
Carr attended Michigan. While there he was named First-team All-Big Ten in 1996 as well as College and Professional Football News as a First-team All-American. He finished third on Michigan's career tackles-for-loss list.

== Professional career ==
Carr was selected in the seventh round (217th overall) in the 1997 NFL draft by the Cincinnati Bengals.

In 1999, he joined the Orlando Predators of the Arena Football League (AFL). While with the Predators, he recorded 13 tackles, four sacks, one pass break up, two forced fumbles and one blocked field goal. In 2000, he joined the Barcelona Dragons of NFL Europe. On April 26, 2003, Carr was signed by the Georgia Force. While there he recorded two tackles, for the season. For 2004, he recorded 15 tackles and 3.5 sacks for the Force. In 2005, he joined the Grand Rapids Rampage where he recorded nine tackles. In March, 2005, he was traded to the Predators in exchange for Cecil Caldwell. During his second and final stint with the Predators he recorded seven tackles and one sack.

== Career statistics ==
=== AFL ===
| Year | Team | Games | Tackles | | | | Sacks | Pass defense | | | | Fumbles | | Blocked | |
| Year | Team | Games | Solo | Ast | Total | TFL | No | Int | BU | PD | Qbh | R | FF | Kick | Saf |
|---|---|---|---|---|---|---|---|---|---|---|---|---|---|---|---|
| 1999 | Orlando | -- | 6 | 7 | 13 | -- | 4 | 0 | 1 | 0 | -- | 0 | 2 | 1 | 0 |
| 2003 | Georgia | -- | 0 | 2 | 2 | -- | 0 | 0 | 0 | 0 | -- | 0 | 0 | 0 | 0 |
| 2004 | Georgia | -- | 9 | 6 | 15 | -- | 3.5 | 0 | 0 | 0 | -- | 0 | 0 | 0 | 0 |
| 2005 | Grand Rapids | -- | 2 | 7 | 9 | -- | 0 | 0 | 0 | 0 | -- | 0 | 0 | 0 | 0 |
| 2005 | Orlando | -- | 4 | 3 | 7 | -- | 1 | 0 | 0 | 0 | -- | 0 | 0 | 0 | 0 |
| Career | | -- | 21 | 25 | 46 | -- | 8.5 | 0 | 1 | 0 | -- | 0 | 2 | 1 | 0 |

=== College ===
| Year | Team | Games | Tackles | | | | Sacks | Pass defense | | | | Fumbles | | Blocked | |
| Year | Team | Games | Solo | Ast | Total | TFL – Yds | No – Yds | Int – Yds | BU | PD | Qbh | Rcv – Yds | FF | Kick | Saf |
|---|---|---|---|---|---|---|---|---|---|---|---|---|---|---|---|
| 1993 | Michigan | 4 | 3 | 1 | 4 | 1-7 | 1-7 | 0 | 0 | 0 | 0 | 0 | 0 | 0 | 0 |
| 1994 | Michigan | 11 | 11 | 5 | 16 | 1-1 | 1-1 | 0 | 0 | 0 | 0 | 0 | 0 | 0 | 0 |
| 1995 | Michigan | 13 | 46 | 36 | 82 | 21-78 | 6-41 | 0 | 2 | 0 | 0 | 0 | 0 | 0 | 0 |
| 1996 | Michigan | 12 | 49 | 29 | 78 | 15-52 | 3-18 | 0 | 2 | 0 | 0 | 3 | 0 | 0 | 0 |
| Career | | 40 | 109 | 71 | 180 | 38-138 | 11-67 | 0 | 4 | 0 | 0 | 3 | 0 | 0 | 0 |

== Coaching career ==
Carr became the defensive line coach at Arizona Western College in 2012, a position he held until 2013. After which he joined the coaching staff at Michigan under head coach Brady Hoke as a student assistant. He spent two seasons at Michigan. In February 2016, it was reported that Carr would be joining the Texas coaching staff. He joined Texas as a Special Assistant/Analyst.

== Personal life ==
After he retired from playing football, Carr ran his on apparel company called Will-O. In 2014, Carr returned to Ann Arbor, Michigan to finish his degree in kinesiology.
