= 1996 Copper Bowl =

- 8th Copper Bowl
Wisconsin Badgers	Utah Utes
(7–5)	(8–4)
Big Ten	WAC
38	10
Head coach: Barry Alvarez	Head coach: Ron McBride
	1	2	3	4	Total
Wisconsin	14	17	0	7	38
Utah	3	0	7	0	10
- Date: December 27, 1996
- Season: 1996
- Stadium: Arizona Stadium
- Location: Tucson, Arizona
- MVP: Ron Dayne (RB, Wisconsin) & Tarek Saleh (LB, Wisconsin)
- Referee: Bill Richardson (Pac-10)
- Attendance: 42,122

United States TV coverage
- Network: ESPN
- Announcers: Brad Nessler and Gary Danielson

The 1996 Copper Bowl was the eighth edition of the Copper Bowl. It was contested between the Wisconsin Badgers and the Utah Utes.

== Game summary ==
Wisconsin scored first on a 38-yard touchdown run from Mike Samuel to open a 7–0 lead. Utah's Daniel Pulsipher answered with a 24-yard field goal to make it 7–3 Wisconsin. Wisconsin's Ron Dayne scored on a 40-yard touchdown run to make it 14–3 Wisconsin.

In the second quarter, Wisconsin's Cyrill Weems intercepted a Utah pass, and returned it 82 yards for a touchdown, making it 21–3 Wisconsin. John Hall added a 38-yard field goal to make it 24–3. Freshman running back Ron Dayne added a 3-yard touchdown run to make it 31–3 Wisconsin at halftime. In the third quarter, Juan Johnson scored on a 1-yard run to make it 31–10. Dayne's third touchdown run of the game, a 1 yarder, made the final score Wisconsin 38, Utah 10.

Dayne finished the game with 30 carries for 246 yards and three touchdowns, breaking the Copper Bowl rushing record and the Big Ten single-season rushing record with the accumulated yardage. This yardage (and the yardage gained in his other three bowl game appearances) is not included in Dayne's NCAA record-breaking career rushing total of 6,397 yards, as it would be for any back trying to break the record today. Dayne was named the offensive most valuable player of the game.
