= 2005 Philadelphia Soul season =

Arena Football League team season

- Head coach: Michael Trigg (weeks 1–5), James Fuller (weeks 6–17)
- Home stadium: Wachovia Center & Wachovia Spectrum (alt.)

Results
- Record: 6–10
- Division place: 3rd
- Playoffs: Did not qualify

The 2005 Philadelphia Soul season was the second season of the Philadelphia Soul. The Soul finished 6–10 on the season and missed the playoffs. The Soul got off to a great start, with a 66–35 win over the Austin Wranglers. But after Week 5, the Soul had 2 wins and 3 losses, leading to the firing of head coach Michael Trigg, and the signing of replacement head coach James Fuller.

== Schedule ==
Week	Date	Opponent	Home/Away	Result
1	January 30	Austin Wranglers	Away	W 66–35
2	February 6	Chicago Rush	Away	L 51–41
3	February 13	Nashville Kats	Home	W 59–48
4	February 20	New Orleans VooDoo	Away	L 61–47
5	February 27	Dallas Desperados	Home	L 72–43
6	March 6	New York Dragons	Home	L 61–54
7	March 11	San Jose SaberCats	Away	L 52–26
8	March 20	Tampa Bay Storm	Home	W 69–63
9	March 26	Grand Rapids Rampage	Home	W 64–41
10	April 3	Columbus Destroyers	Away	W 62–45
11	April 10	Colorado Crush	Away	L 77–56
12	April 17	Las Vegas Gladiators	Home	L 56–49
13	April 24	New York Dragons	Away	L 51–37
14	April 30	Orlando Predators	Home	W 64–60
15		Bye	Week	
16	May 15	Columbus Destroyers	Home	L 55–52
17	May 22	Dallas Desperados	Away	L 77–63
