= NCAA Division I FBS rushing leaders =

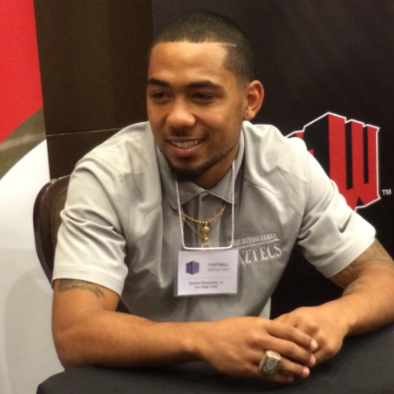
Donnel Pumphrey is recognized as the career record holder in rushing yards.

The NCAA Division I FBS rushing leaders are career, single-season, and single-game leaders in rushing yards and rushing touchdowns in the NCAA Division I Football Bowl Subdivision. These lists are dominated by more recent players for several reasons:

- Since 1955, seasons have increased from 10 games to 11 and then 12 games in length.
- The NCAA didn't allow freshmen to play varsity football until 1972 (with the exception of the World War II years), allowing players to have four-year careers.
- Bowl games only began counting toward single-season and career statistics in 2002. This affects many players from before that time period, most notably Ron Dayne.
- In recent decades, starting with the Southeastern Conference in 1992, FBS conferences have introduced their own championship games, which have always counted fully toward single-season and career statistics.
- The NCAA ruled that the 2020 season, heavily disrupted by COVID-19, would not count against the athletic eligibility of any football player. This gave every player active in that season the opportunity for five years of eligibility instead of the normal four.
- Since 2018, players have been allowed to participate in as many as four games in a redshirt season; previously, playing in even one game "burned" the redshirt. Since 2024, postseason games have not counted against the four-game limit. These changes to redshirt rules have given very recent players several extra games to accumulate statistics.
- Only seasons in which a team was considered to be a part of the Football Bowl Subdivision are included in these lists.

Legend
Indicates Quarterback
Active FBS Player

Statistics accurate as of January 8, 2025.

== Rushing yards ==
=== Career ===
The NCAA recognizes San Diego State's Donnel Pumphrey as the career leading in rushing yards. Pumphrey set the record in the fourth quarter of his final game, the 2016 Las Vegas Bowl, ending with 6,405 total yards. However, this is controversial as Wisconsin's Ron Dayne actually rushed for 7,125 in his career, but all four of Dayne's seasons came before the NCAA recognized bowl statistics (doing so only in 2002) as part of season and career totals. Dayne officially is listed as having eight yards less than of Pumphrey despite only one player having their bowl statistics included. This has been seen as controversial by many fans and writers, who feel that the NCAA should count all pre-2002 bowl statistics as official if post-2002 ones are. Dayne himself congratulated Pumphrey but agreed that counting Pumphrey's bowl stats but not his own was unfair.

Additionally, Pittsburgh's Tony Dorsett would be ahead of Pumphrey if his bowl statistics were counted.

All players on the career list are running backs. The career leader in rushing yards by a quarterback is Navy's Keenan Reynolds, who rushed for 4,559 yards in his career.

#	Player	Yards	Team
1	Donnel Pumphrey	6,405	2013 2014 2015 2016 San Diego State
2	Ron Dayne	6,397	1996 1997 1998 1999 Wisconsin
3	Ricky Williams	6,279	1995 1996 1997 1998 Texas
4	Jonathan Taylor	6,174	2017 2018 2019 Wisconsin
5	Tony Dorsett	6,082	1973 1974 1975 1976 Pittsburgh
6	DeAngelo Williams	6,026	2002 2003 2004 2005 Memphis
7	Royce Freeman	5,621	2014 2015 2016 2017 Oregon
8	Charles White	5,598	1976 1977 1978 1979 USC
9	Travis Prentice	5,596	1996 1997 1998 1999 Miami (OH)
10	Cedric Benson	5,540	2001 2002 2003 2004 Texas
10	Justin Jackson	5,440	2014 2015 2016 2017 Northwestern
12	Myles Gaskin	5,323	2015 2016 2017 2018 Washington
13	Damion Fletcher	5,302	2006 2007 2008 2009 Southern Miss
14	LaDainian Tomlinson	5,263	1997 1998 1999 2000 TCU
15	Herschel Walker	5,259	1980 1981 1982 Georgia

#	Player	Yards	Team
16	Archie Griffin	5,177	1972 1973 1974 1975 Ohio State
17	Garrett Wolfe	5,164	2004 2005 2006 Northern Illinois
18	Montee Ball	5,140	2009 2010 2011 2012 Wisconsin
19	Marquez Cooper	5,130	2020 2021 2022 Kent State ᛫ 2023 Ball State ᛫ 2024 San Diego State
20	LaMichael James	5,082	2009 2010 2011 Oregon
21	Mike Hart	5,040	2004 2005 2006 2007 Michigan
22	Avon Cobourne	5,039	1999 2000 2001 2002 West Virginia
23	Darren Lewis	5,012	1987 1988 1989 1990 Texas A&M
24	Darren Sproles	4,979	2001 2002 2003 2004 Kansas State
25	Anthony Thompson	4,965	1986 1987 1988 1989 Indiana
26	George Rogers	4,958	1977 1978 1979 1980 South Carolina
27	DonTrell Moore	4,956	2002 2003 2004 2005 New Mexico
28	Travis Etienne	4,952	2017 2018 2019 2020 Clemson
29	Trevor Cobb	4,948	1989 1990 1991 1992 Rice
30	Kareem Hunt	4,945	2013 2014 2015 2016 Toledo

=== Single season ===
The single-season record holder is Oklahoma State’s Barry Sanders. Navy's Malcolm Perry rushed for 2,017 yards in 2019, which currently leads non-running back players.

#	Player	Yards	Team
1	Barry Sanders	2,628	1988 Oklahoma State
2	Ashton Jeanty	2,601	2024 Boise State
3	Melvin Gordon	2,587	2014 Wisconsin
4	Kevin Smith	2,567	2007 UCF
5	Marcus Allen	2,342	1981 USC
6	Rashaad Penny	2,248	2017 San Diego State
7	Derrick Henry	2,219	2015 Alabama
8	Jonathan Taylor	2,194	2018 Wisconsin
9	Troy Davis	2,185	1996 Iowa State
10	Andre Williams	2,177	2013 Boston College

#	Player	Yards	Team
11	LaDainian Tomlinson	2,158	2000 TCU
12	Mike Rozier	2,148	1983 Nebraska
13	Donnel Pumphrey	2,133	2016 San Diego State
14	Matt Forte	2,127	2007 Tulane
15	Ricky Williams	2,124	1998 Texas
16	Bryce Love	2,118	2017 Stanford
17	Chuba Hubbard	2,094	2019 Oklahoma State
18	Larry Johnson	2,087	2002 Penn State
19	Donald Brown	2,083	2008 UConn
20	Rashaan Salaam	2,055	1994 Colorado

#	Player	Yards	Team
21	Tevin Coleman	2,036	2014 Indiana
22	D'Onta Foreman	2,028	2016 Texas
23	Christian McCaffrey	2,019	2015 Stanford
24	J. J. Arrington	2,018	2004 California
25	Malcolm Perry	2,017	2019 Navy
26	Ray Rice	2,012	2007 Rutgers
27	Troy Davis	2,010	1995 Iowa State
28	J. K. Dobbins	2,003	2019 Ohio State
28	Jonathan Taylor	2,003	2019 Wisconsin
30	Byron Hanspard	2,000	1996 Texas Tech

=== Single game ===
The single-game rushing record belongs to Oklahoma's Samaje Perine, whose 427 yards in a 2014 game against Kansas broke a record set just the week before by Wisconsin's Melvin Gordon. Prior to Perine and Gordon, the only player to rush for 400 yards in a game was LaDainian Tomlinson. All players on the career list are running backs. The single-game leader for a quarterback is Arizona's Khalil Tate, who rushed for 327 yards in a 2017 game against Colorado.

#	Player	Yards	Date / Team
1	Samaje Perine	427	Nov. 22, 2014 Oklahoma
2	Jaret Patterson	409	Nov. 28, 2020 Buffalo
3	Melvin Gordon	408	Nov. 15, 2014 Wisconsin
4	LaDainian Tomlinson	406	Nov. 20, 1999 TCU
5	Tony Sands	396	Nov. 23, 1991 Kansas
6	Marshall Faulk	386	Sep. 14, 1991 San Diego State
7	Troy Davis	378	Sep. 28, 1996 Iowa State
8	Anthony Thompson	377	Nov. 11, 1989 Indiana
8	Robbie Mixon	377	Nov. 2, 2002 Central Michigan
10	Travis Prentice	376	Nov. 6, 1999 Miami (OH)
11	Eugene Baker	373	Sep. 20, 1997 Kent State
12	Ka'Deem Carey	366	Nov. 10, 2012 Arizona
13	Rueben Mayes	357	Oct. 27, 1984 Washington State
13	Mike Pringle	357	Nov. 4, 1989 Cal State Fullerton
15	Eddie Lee Ivery	356	Nov. 11, 1978 Georgia Tech
15	Brian Pruitt	356	Nov. 5, 1994 Central Michigan

#	Player	Yards	Date / Team
17	Montel Harris	355	Nov. 17, 2012 Temple
18	Garrett Wolfe	353	Sep. 30, 2006 Northern Illinois
19	Scott Harley	351	Nov. 30, 1996 East Carolina
20	Eric Allen	350	Oct. 30, 1971 Michigan State
20	Ricky Williams	350	Oct. 3, 1998 Texas
22	Paul Palmer	349	Oct. 11, 1986 Temple
22	Matt Forte	349	Oct. 20, 2007 Tulane
24	Shun White	348	Aug. 30, 2008 Navy
25	Ron Johnson	347	Nov. 16, 1968 Michigan
25	Ricky Bell	347	Oct. 9, 1976 USC
27	Tavon Austin	345	Nov. 11, 2012 West Virginia
27	Leon Allen	345	Nov. 15, 2014 Western Kentucky
29	Tony Jeffery	343	Sep. 13, 1986 TCU
30	D'Onta Foreman	341	Nov. 5, 2016 Texas

== Rushing touchdowns ==
=== Career ===
The career leader in rushing touchdowns is Navy's Keenan Reynolds, whose 88 career touchdowns passed a record previously held by Montee Ball.

#	Player	TDs	Team
1	Keenan Reynolds	88	2012 2013 2014 2015 Navy
2	Montee Ball	77	2009 2010 2011 2012 Wisconsin
3	Travis Prentice	73	1996 1997 1998 1999 Miami (OH)
4	Ricky Williams	72	1995 1996 1997 1998 Texas
4	Kenneth Dixon	72	2012 2013 2014 2015 Louisiana Tech
6	Travis Etienne	70	2017 2018 2019 2020 Clemson
7	Devin Singletary	66	2016 2017 2018 Florida Atlantic
8	Anthony Thompson	64	1986 1987 1988 1989 Indiana
8	Cedric Benson	62	2001 2002 2003 2004 Texas
10	Ron Dayne	63	1996 1997 1998 1999 Wisconsin
11	Donnel Pumphrey	62	2013 2014 2015 2016 San Diego State
12	Royce Freeman	60	2014 2015 2016 2017 Oregon
13	Eric Crouch	59	1998 1999 2000 2001 Nebraska
13	Colin Kaepernick	59	2007 2008 2009 2010 Nevada
15	Ian Johnson	58	2005 2006 2007 2008 Boise State
15	Blake Corum	58	2020 2021 2022 2023 Michigan

#	Player	TDs	Team
17	Marshall Faulk	57	1991 1992 1993 San Diego State
17	Tim Tebow	57	2006 2007 2008 2009 Florida
17	Myles Gaskin	57	2015 2016 2017 2018 Washington
20	Steve Owens	56	1967 1968 1969 Oklahoma
20	Ken Simonton	56	1998 1999 2000 2001 Oregon State
20	Collin Klein	56	2009 2010 2011 2012 Kansas State
23	Tony Dorsett	55	1973 1974 1975 1976 Pittsburgh
23	Chester Taylor	55	1998 1999 2000 2001Toledo
23	DeAngelo Williams	55	2002 2003 2004 2005 Memphis
26	LaDainian Tomlinson	54	1997 1998 1999 2000 TCU
27	Dwone Hicks	53	1999 2000 2001 2002 Middle Tennessee
27	LaMichael James	53	2009 2010 2011 Oregon
27	Bernard Pierce	53	2009 2010 2011 Temple
27	Mohamed Ibrahim	53	2018 2019 2020 2021 2022 Minnesota

=== Single season ===
The single-season record was set by Barry Sanders in 1988. The record for quarterbacks (or any position other than running back) was set by Bryson Daily in 2024.

#	Player	TDs	Team
1	Barry Sanders	37	1988 Oklahoma State
2	Montee Ball	33	2011 Wisconsin
3	Devin Singletary	32	2017 Florida Atlantic
3	Bryson Daily	32	2024 Army
5	Kapri Bibbs	31	2013 Colorado State
5	Keenan Reynolds	31	2013 Navy
7	Mike Rozier	29	1983 Nebraska
7	Kevin Smith	29	2007 UCF
7	Melvin Gordon	29	2014 Wisconsin
7	Ashton Jeanty	29	2024 Boise State
11	Terry Metcalf	28	1971 Long Beach State
11	Willis McGahee	28	2002 Miami (FL)
11	Toby Gerhart	28	2009 Stanford
11	Jay Ajayi	28	2014 Boise State
11	Derrick Henry	28	2015 Alabama

#	Player	TDs	Team
16	Ricky Williams	27	1998 Texas
16	Lee Suggs	27	2000 Virginia Tech
16	Ricky Dobbs	27	2009 Navy
16	Collin Klein	27	2011 Kansas State
16	Bernard Pierce	27	2011 Temple
16	Kenneth Dixon	27	2012 Louisiana Tech
16	Anthony Wales	27	2016 Western Kentucky
16	Blake Corum	27	2023 Michigan

#	Player	TDs	Team
24	Leon Burns	26	1969 Long Beach State
24	Lydell Mitchell	26	1971 Penn State
24	Brock Forsey	26	2002 Boise State
24	James Conner	26	2014 Pittsburgh
24	Najee Harris	26	2020 Alabama
29	Ricky Williams	25	1997 Texas
29	Travis Prentice	25	1997 Miami (OH)
29	Ian Johnson	25	2006 Boise State
29	Will Worth	25	2016 Navy
29	Tre Stewart	25	2024 Jacksonville State
29	Caleb Hawkins	25	2025 North Texas

=== Single game ===
The single-game record of 8 is shared by Howard Griffith and Jaret Patterson. Five players have rushed for 7 touchdowns in a game, and many more have rushed for 6.

#	Player	TDs	Date / Team
1	Howard Griffith	8	Sep. 22, 1990 Illinois
1	Jaret Patterson	8	Nov. 28, 2020 Buffalo
3	Showboat Boykin	7	Dec. 1, 1951 Ole Miss
3	Marshall Faulk	7	Sep. 14, 1991 San Diego State
3	Montel Harris	7	Nov. 17, 2012 Temple
3	Keenan Reynolds	7	Nov. 22, 2013 Navy
3	Kalen Ballage	7	Sep. 10, 2016 Arizona State
8	6 – many times		
