= Jason Horn =

American football player

No. 94 – Michigan Wolverines
- Position: Defensive tackle

Personal information
- Born: c. 1973; Tippecanoe County, Indiana
- Listed height: 6 ft 5 in (1.96 m)
- Listed weight: 277 lb (126 kg)

Career information
- College: Michigan (1992–1995)

Awards and highlights
- First-team All-American (1995); First-team All-Big Ten (1995)

Jason Horn (born c. 1973) is an American former college football player. He played as a defensive tackle for the Michigan Wolverines football team from 1992 to 1995.

Horn grew up on a farm in Tippecanoe County, Indiana, a short distance from the Purdue University campus. He attended McCutcheon High School in Lafayette, Indiana.

Horn was selected by the American Football Coaches Association (AFCA) as a first-team defensive lineman on the 1995 All-America college football team. He was selected for the second team by the Associated Press. He was a first-team All-Big Ten pick in both 1994 and 1995.

In 1995, Horn had 11 sacks, 18 tackles for a loss, and a school-record 136 yards of tackles for loss yardage. Over his four years at Michigan, he played 48 games and finished among Michigan's all-time leaders with 24 sacks (second), 184 yards on sacks (third), 39 tackles for loss (third), and 185 yards on tackles for loss (second).
