= 1996 Purdue Boilermakers football team =

American college football season

1996 Purdue Boilermakers football
- Conference: Big Ten Conference
- Record: 3–8 (2–6 Big Ten)
- Head coach: Jim Colletto (6th season)
- Offensive coordinator: Tim Salem (2nd season)
- Offensive scheme: Pro set
- Co-defensive coordinators: Bob Morris (2nd season); Ty Smith (1st season)
- Base defense: 4–3
- MVP: Brian Alford
- Captains: Jon Krick; Emmett Zitelli
- Home stadium: Ross–Ade Stadium

1996 Big Ten Conference football standings
	Conf.			Overall
Team	W		L	W		L
No. 2 Ohio State +	7	–	1	11	–	1
No. 15 Northwestern +	7	–	1	9	–	3
No. 7 Penn State	6	–	2	11	–	2
No. 18 Iowa	6	–	2	9	–	3
No. 20 Michigan	5	–	3	8	–	4
Michigan State	5	–	3	6	–	6
Wisconsin	3	–	5	8	–	5
Purdue	2	–	6	3	–	8
Minnesota	1	–	7	4	–	7
Indiana	1	–	7	3	–	8
Illinois	1	–	7	2	–	9
+ – Conference co-champions; Rankings from AP Poll

The 1996 Purdue Boilermakers football team represented Purdue University as a member of the Big Ten Conference during the 1996 NCAA Division I-A football season. Led by Jim Colletto in his sixth and final season as head coach, the Boilermakers compiled an overall record of 3–8 with a mark of 2–6 in conference play, placing eighth in the Big Ten. Purdue played home games at Ross–Ade Stadium in West Lafayette, Indiana.

Purdue started the season 0–3, averaging under seven points per game. Over the final eight games the Boilermakers went 3–5, failing to qualify for a bowl game for the 12 straight season. The Boilermakers also failed to win a road game.

Brian Alford received numerous postseason accolades, including First Team All-Big Ten honors by both the coaches and the media, and broke the Purdue record for most receiving touchdowns in a single season. Senior captain Emmett Zitelli was selected to the Second Team All-Big team by both the coaches and the media. After the season, none of the Boilermakers were selected in the 1997 NFL draft, Zitelli signed as an undrafted free agent.

== Schedule ==
Date	Time	Opponent	Site	TV	Result	Attendance	Source
August 31	12:30 pm	at Michigan State	Spartan Stadium; East Lansing, MI	ESPN	L 14–52	72,511	
September 14	2:30 pm	at No. 9 Notre Dame*	Notre Dame Stadium; Notre Dame, IN (rivalry)	NBC	L 0–35	59,075	
September 21	7:00 pm	West Virginia*	Ross–Ade Stadium; West Lafayette, IN		L 6–20	39,445	
September 28	12:00 pm	NC State*	Ross–Ade Stadium; West Lafayette, IN	ESPN Plus	W 42–21	39,739	
October 5	2:00 pm	Minnesota	Ross–Ade Stadium; West Lafayette, IN		W 30–27	45,805	
October 12	12:30 pm	at No. 10 Penn State	Beaver Stadium; University Park, PA	ESPN	L 14–31	96,653	
October 19	3:30 pm	No. 2 Ohio State^{†}	Ross–Ade Stadium; West Lafayette, IN	ABC	L 14–42	58,323	
November 2	12:30 pm	at Wisconsin	Camp Randall Stadium; Madison, WI	ESPN	L 25–33	78,330	
November 9	12:30 pm	No. 9 Michigan	Ross–Ade Stadium; West Lafayette, IN	ESPN2	W 9–3	39,328	
November 16	12:00 pm	at No. 13 Northwestern	Dyche Stadium; Evanston, IL		L 24–27	41,178	
November 23	1:00 pm	Indiana	Ross–Ade Stadium; West Lafayette, IN (Old Oaken Bucket)		L 16–33	49,197	
*Non-conference game; ^{†}Homecoming; Rankings from AP Poll released prior to the game; All times are in Eastern time

== Preseason ==
In 1995 the Purdue Boilermakers had the second best season in the Colletto era. The team finished with a 4–6–1 regular season record, failing to qualify for a postseason bowl game for the 11th straight year. The Boilermakers struggled to win games, facing what was rated as the third most difficult schedule in the nation in 1995. However, Purdue did finish first in the Big Ten in rushing offense.

Going into 1996, there was doubt that Purdue could successfully replace all-time leading rusher Mike Alstott and have a winning season. Entering the season, Colletto thought that each of his quarterbacks would be a contributor on offense, electing Rick Trefzger as the team's starting quarterback, and moving former tailback, Edwin Watson to fullback to replace Alstott.

== Game summaries ==
=== NC State ===
- Edwin Watson 29 rushes, 227 yards

=== Minnesota ===
- Kendall Matthews 30 rushes, 131 yards

=== Michigan ===
#9 Michigan at Purdue

Team	1	2	3	4	Total
Michigan	0	0	3	0	3
• Purdue	0	3	0	6	9

- Date: November 9
- Location: Ross–Ade Stadium • West Lafayette, Indiana
- Game attendance: 40,624

Scoring summary
2	7:22	Purdue	Shane Ryan 28 yard field goal	Purdue 3-0
3	10:07	Michigan	Remy Hamilton 21 yard field goal	Tie 3-3
4	7:20	Purdue	Brian Alford 5 yard pass from Rick Trefzger (kick failed)	Purdue 9-3

Purdue's first win versus Michigan since 1984

== Personnel ==
=== Roster ===
1996 Purdue Boilermakers football team roster
Players
Coaches
Offense

Pos.	#	Name	Class
WR	1	Donald Winston	Fr
QB	3	John Reeves	So
WR	5	Willie Tillman	Jr
WR	6	Isaac Jones	Jr
QB	12	Billy Dicken	Jr
QB	13	Rick Trefzger	Sr
FB	16	Eric Haddad	Jr
WR	20	Chris Daniels	Fr
WR	24	Kirk Olivadotti	Sr
RB	25	Curtis Taylor	Jr
FB	36	Edwin Watson	Jr
FB	37	Dartanian Sanders	Sr
RB	43	Kendall Matthews	Sr
FB	45	Cullen Bryant Jr.	Fr
OT	52	Nick Sweeney	So
OT	54	Mark Fischer	Sr
G	56	Chukky Okobi	Fr
C	63	Jim Niedrach	So
G	72	Emmett Zitelli	Sr
OT	73	David Cohen	So
G	74	Wayne Finchum	So
G	76	Dan Maly	So
C	78	Brian Nicely	So
OT	79	Chad Manning	So
WR	80	Brian Alford	Jr
TE	81	Brandon Jewell	Sr
TE	90	Pete VanderWeele	Jr
TE	91	Matt Light	Fr

Defense

Pos.	#	Name	Class
FS	2	Derrick Brown	Jr
CB	4	Derrick Winston	Sr
SS	7	Adrian Beasley	So
DB	10	Lee Brush	Jr
FS	11	Michael Hawthorne	So
CB	14	Jamel Coleman	Jr
LB	19	Joe Hagins	Sr
DB	22	Lamar Conard	Fr
SS	23	Willie Burroughs	Jr
CB	27	Willie Washington	Fr
LB	28	Mike Rose	Fr
DB	29	Reggie Johnson
LB	32	Noble Jones	So
LB	34	Chike Okeafor	Jr
CB	38	Bryce Gillins	Fr
LB	29	Nick Zitelli
DB	46	Glenn Davis
LB	48	Chris Koeppen	Sr
DE	49	Chukie Nwokorie	So
LB	51	Troy Bacon
DT	53	Jon Krick	Sr
LB	57	Ray Lee	So
DE	58	Craig Williams	Sr
DE	59	Rosevelt Colvin	So
DT	71	Anthony Gutwein	Jr
DE	82	David Nugent	Fr
LB	86	Scott Dobbins
DT	97	Greg Smith	Sr
DT	98	Leo Perez	Sr

Special teams

Pos.	#	Name	Class
PK	17	Chris Arnce	Jr
P	26	Danny Rogers	Fr
P	29	Brandon Kaser	So
PK	96	Shane Ryan	Fr

Head coach

- Jim Colletto

Coordinators/assistant coaches

- Tim Salem (offensive coordinator)
- Bob Morris (co-defensive coordinator, defensive backs)
- Ty Smith (co-defensive coordinator, linebackers)
- Chester Caddas (defensive line)
- Randy Fichtner (wide receivers, recruiting coordinator)
- Tom Freeman (offensive line)
- Leroy Keyes (running backs)
- Karl Morgan (defensive line)
- Kurt Van Valkenburgh (defensive backs)

Legend

- (C) Team captain
- (S) Suspended
- (I) Ineligible
- Injured
- Redshirt

=== Depth chart ===
Defense

FS
Derrick Brown
Michael Hawthorne

WLB	MLB	SLB
⋅	Chris Koeppen	⋅
Noble Jones	Ray Lee	⋅

SS
Willie Burroughs
Adrian Beasley

CB
Derrick Winston
Willie Washington

DE	DT	DT	DE
Rosevelt Colvin	Jon Krick	Leo Perez	Craig Williams
Chukie Nwokorie	Anthony Gutwein	Greg Smith	David Nugent

CB
Jamel Coleman
Bryce Gillins

Offense

WR
Brian Alford
Kirk Olivadotti

LT	LG	C	RG	RT
Mark Fischer	Wayne Finchum	Brian Nicely	Emmett Zitelli	Nick Sweeney
Chad Manning	Dan Maly	Jim Niedrach	Chukky Okobi	David Cohen

TE
Brandon Jewell
Pete Vander Weele

WR
Willie Tillman
Isaac Jones

QB
Rick Trefzger
John Reeves

RB
Kendall Matthews
Curtis Taylor

FB
Edwin Watson
Dartanian Sanders

Special teams
PK Shane Ryan
PK Chris Arnce
P Danny Rogers
P Brandon Kaser
KR Joe Hagins
PR Donald Winston
LS Chris Daniels
H Rick Trefzger

== Statistics ==
=== Passing ===
Player	Comp	Att	Yards	TD	INT
Rick Trefzger	96	170	1,158	8	8
John Reeves	51	102	772	6	5
Billy Dicken	40	81	518	1	4

=== Rushing ===
Player	Att	Yards	TD
Edwin Watson	194	768	6
Kendall Matthews	123	471	3
John Reeves	52	157	
Rick Trefzger	43	56	1
Donald Winston	2	49	
Lee Johnson	12	43	
Eric Haddad	6	24	
Chris Koeppen	1	24	
Brian Alford	3	22	
Dartanian Sanders	5	18	
Billy Dicken	20	-40	

=== Receiving ===
Player	Rec	Yards	TD
Brian Alford	63	1,057	12
Willie Tillman	40	557	2
Edwin Watson	25	220	
Isaac Jones	14	241	1
Kirk Olivadotti	16	171	
Brandon Jewell	11	92	
Kendall Matthews	9	29	
Chris Daniels	1	22	
Eric Haddad	2	19	
Lee Johnson	2	16	
Matt Light	1	16	
Reggie Johnson	1	7	
Donald Winston	1	5	
Dartanian Sanders	1	-4	
