= 2005 Orlando Predators season =

Arena Football League team season

- Head coach: Jay Gruden
- Home stadium: TD Waterhouse Centre

Results
- Record: 10-6
- Division place: 2nd
- Playoffs: Lost Conference Finals (Force) 58-60

The 2005 Orlando Predators season was the 15th season for the franchise. They went 10-6 and lost in the National Conference Finals to the Georgia Force.

== Regular season ==
=== Schedule ===
Week	Date	Opponent	Results		Game site
Week	Date	Opponent	Final score	Team record	Game site
1	January 30	Colorado Crush	W 39-36	1-0	TD Waterhouse Centre
2	February 3	at Arizona Rattlers	W 51-40	2-0	America West Arena
3	February 11	Tampa Bay Storm	W 61-46	3-0	TD Waterhouse Centre
4	February 17	at Dallas Desperados	L 28-42	3–1	American Airlines Center
5	February 25	at Chicago Rush	W 48-35	4–1	Allstate Arena
6	March 6	San Jose SaberCats	L 38-57	4-2	TD Waterhouse Centre
7	March 13	at New Orleans VooDoo	W 63-52	5-2	New Orleans Arena
8	March 19	at Georgia Force	L 47-49	5-3	Philips Arena
9	March 25	Austin Wranglers	W 51-21	6-3	TD Waterhouse Centre
10	April 3	Los Angeles Avengers	W 55-54 (OT)	7-3	TD Waterhouse Centre
11	April 9	at Tampa Bay Storm	L 42-54	7-4	St. Pete Times Forum
12	April 15	New York Dragons	W 72-60	8-4	TD Waterhouse Centre
13	April 22	Georgia Force	W 52-49	9-4	TD Waterhouse Centre
14	April 30	at Philadelphia Soul	L 60-64	9-5	Wells Fargo Center
15	May 7	at Austin Wranglers	L 42-56	9-6	Frank Erwin Center
16	Bye				
17	May 22	at New Orleans VooDoo	W 51-40	10-6	TD Waterhouse Centre

== Playoffs ==
Round	Date	Opponent	Results		Game site
Round	Date	Opponent	Final score	Team record	Game site
Conference Semifinals	May 29	at New York Dragons	W 47-42	1–0	Orlando Arena
Conference Finals	June 4	at Georgia Force	L 58-60	1-1	Philips Arena
