= Ron Dayne =

American football player (born 1978)

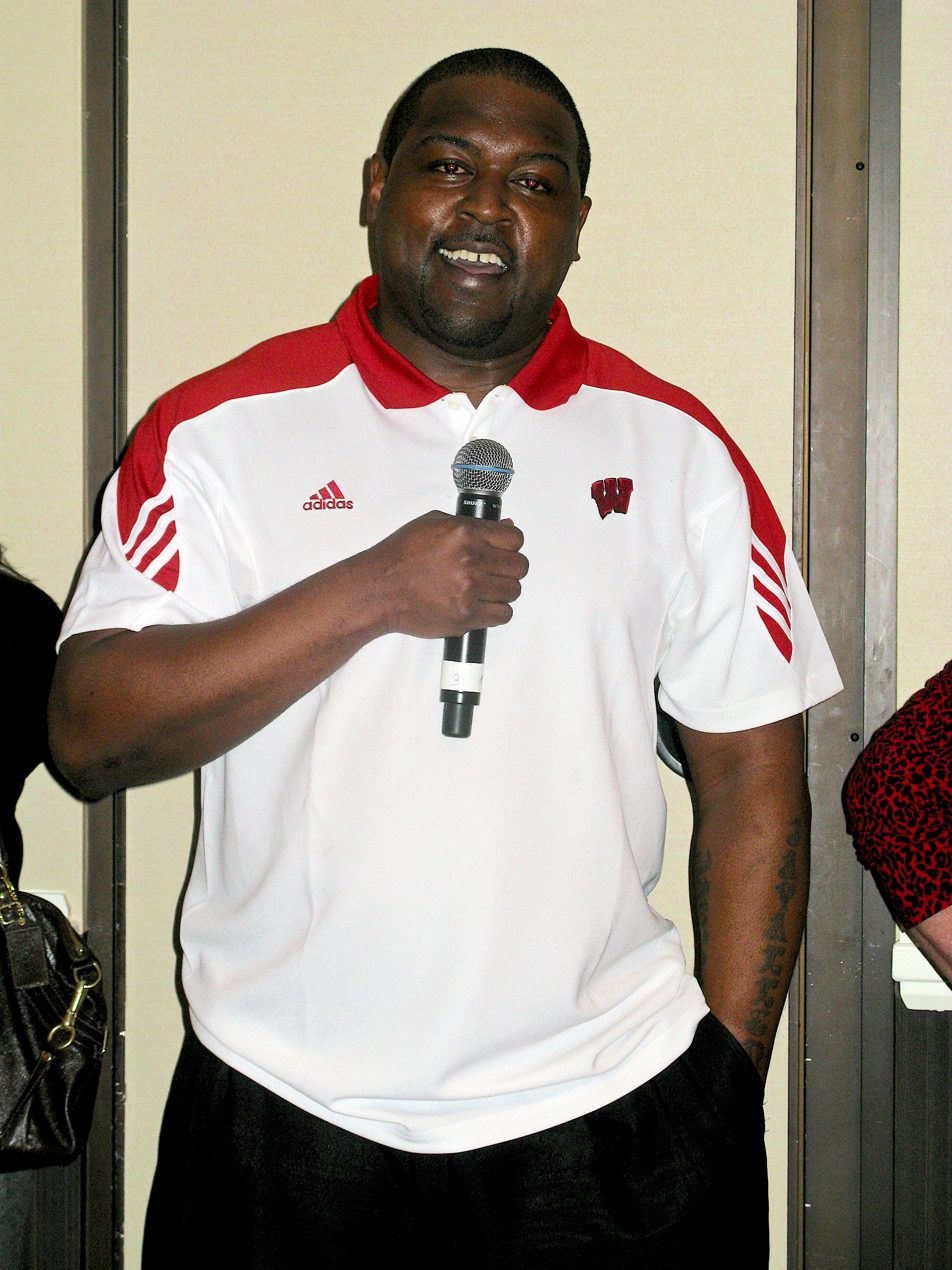
- Dayne in 2010

No. 27, 33, 36
- Position: Running back

Personal information
- Born: March 14, 1978 (age 48); Berlin, New Jersey, U.S.
- Listed height: 5 ft 10 in (1.78 m)
- Listed weight: 245 lb (111 kg)

Career information
- High school: Overbrook (Pine Hill, New Jersey)
- College: Wisconsin (1996–1999)
- NFL draft: 2000: 1st round, 11th overall pick

Career history
- New York Giants (2000–2004); Denver Broncos (2005); Houston Texans (2006–2007)

Awards and highlights
- Heisman Trophy (1999); Unanimous All-American (1999); 2× First-team All-American (1997, 1998); Third-team All-American (1996); Big Ten Male Athlete of the Year (2000); Wisconsin Badgers No. 33 retired

Career NFL statistics
- Rushing attempts: 983
- Rushing yards: 3,722
- Rushing touchdowns: 28
- Receptions: 57
- Receiving yards: 340
- Stats at Pro Football Reference
- College Football Hall of Fame

Ronald Dayne (born March 14, 1978) is an American former football player. A running back, he played college football for the Wisconsin Badgers, winning the Heisman Trophy in 1999. Dayne then played professional football for eight seasons in the National Football League (NFL). He was selected by the New York Giants in the first round of the 2000 NFL draft, and also played for the Denver Broncos and Houston Texans.

Dayne is one of only two players in college football history to rush for 2,000-plus yards in a single season twice in his career, the other being Troy Davis of Iowa State.

Dayne would be the all-time rushing yards leader in NCAA Division I FBS history, with 7,125 yards with the bowl game statistics included, though the statistics accumulated in bowl games prior to 2002 are not accounted for by the NCAA. Thus, Dayne is officially recognized as the second-leading rusher behind Donnel Pumphrey.

== Early life ==
When Dayne was a child, his parents divorced, and he was sent to live with relatives. Due to a lack of reliable adult relatives, Dayne was forced to take on a parental role to his younger sister when he was just ten years old. Raised in Berlin Township, New Jersey, his athleticism and speed made him a star running back at Overbrook High School in Pine Hill, where he was heavily recruited by many colleges. He also excelled at track and field. In 1995, he won the New Jersey Meet of Champions, setting a new meet record in the discus throw. In 1996, he won state titles in both the shot put and discus, breaking both meet records. He won the Meet of Champions in both events and breaking his own meet record in the discus. He has the fifth-best distance ever thrown in the discus by a U.S. high school athlete at 216 feet 11 inches (66.12 m).

His football role was expected to change when he reached college. At 270 pounds (120 kg) out of high school, many felt that he was too big to be a tailback and believed he would be best suited as a fullback. Eventually, coach Barry Alvarez promised Dayne a tailback position and persuaded him to attend Wisconsin.

== College career ==
Dayne attended the University of Wisconsin-Madison, where he played for the Wisconsin Badgers football team from 1996 to 1999. Known as the "Great Dayne" and "The Dayne Train" throughout college, Dayne was the starting running back all four years at Wisconsin and had 1,220 carries during his career.

Over his four seasons, Dayne set the NCAA Division I-A rushing record for total yards in a career. He gained 1,863 yards as a freshman, 1,421 as a sophomore, 1,325 as a junior, and 1,834 as a senior. He broke the record in the final game of the 1999 season against Iowa. Dayne ended his career with 6,397 rushing yards (which does not include yardage from the four bowl games he played in), eclipsing the record set the previous year by Ricky Williams of Texas. The record has since been eclipsed by San Diego State back Donnel Pumphrey.

Dayne excelled in three bowl games for Wisconsin. He rushed for 246 to lead the Badgers to a 38–10 victory in the 1996 Copper Bowl against Utah, garnering MVP honors. Dayne only gained 36 yards in the 1998 Outback Bowl loss against Georgia the next season, but bounced back the next two seasons with 246 yards and 200 yards, respectively, in the Badgers' 1999 and 2000 Rose Bowl wins. Dayne won MVP honors in both games, becoming only the third player in the history of the Rose Bowl to repeat as MVP — and the first and still only Big Ten player to do so. Bob Schloredt (Washington/AAWU), Charles White (USC/Pac-10) were the first two, and Vince Young (Texas/Big 12) has subsequently accomplished this feat.

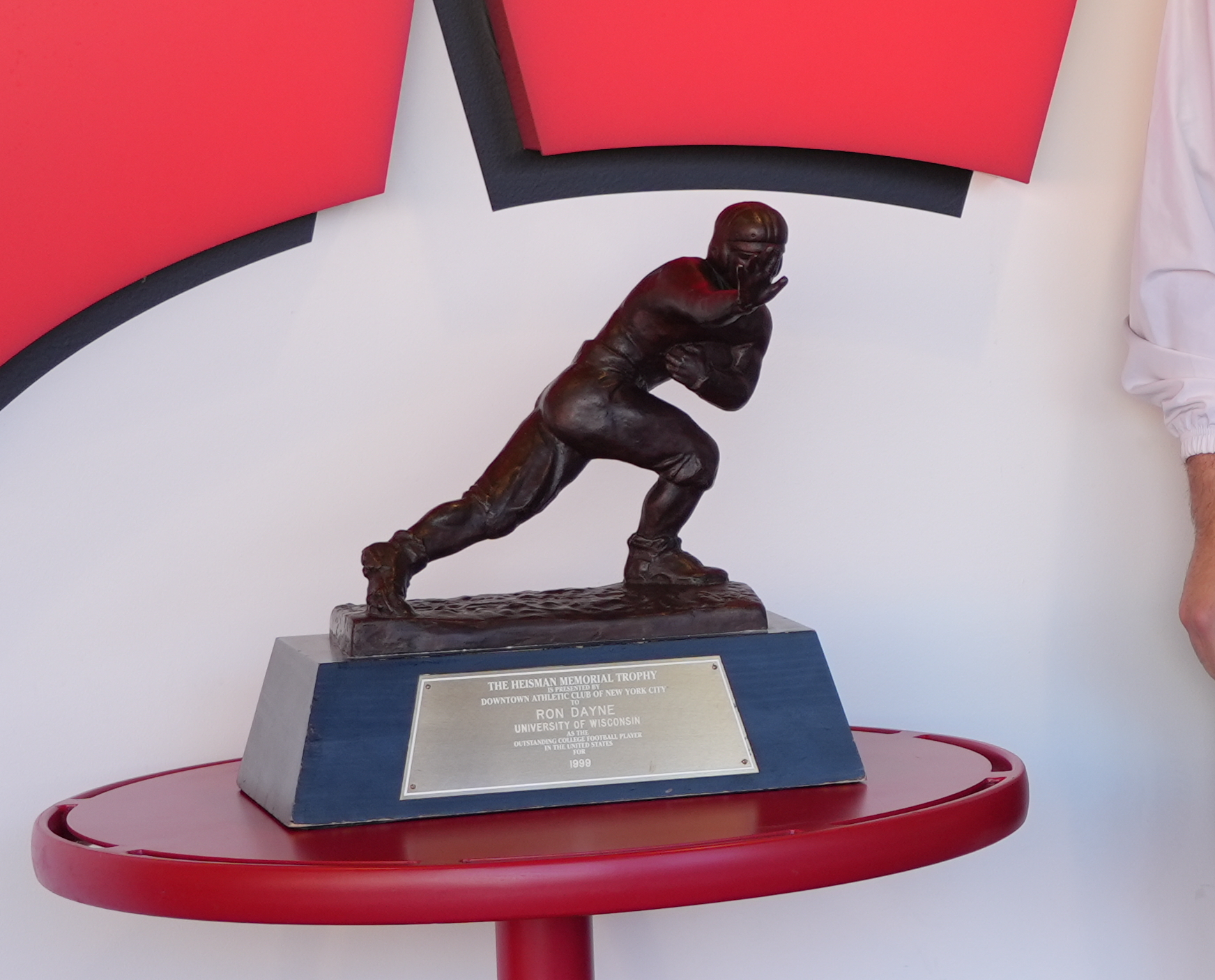
The Heisman Trophy received by Dayne in 1999

Dayne won the Heisman Trophy in 1999 as well as other awards throughout college, including Big Ten Player of the Year for 1999 and All-American placement in 1996, 1998 and 1999. His name and number is one of six displayed on the Camp Randall Stadium façade. Dayne's #33 was officially retired during the November 10, 2007, game against Michigan.

Dayne was inducted into the University of Wisconsin-Madison's Athletic Hall Of Fame as part of the 2009 class alongside fellow NFL player Joe Panos and MLB pitcher Thornton Kipper. For his contribution to the Rose Bowl game, he was inducted into the Rose Bowl Hall of Fame on December 31, 2011. In 2013, Dayne was inducted into the College Football Hall of Fame.

== Professional career ==
Pre-draft measurables
| Height | Weight | 40-yard dash |
|---|---|---|
| 5 ft 10 7/8 in (1.80 m) | 259 lb (117 kg) | 4.65 s |
All values from NFL Combine

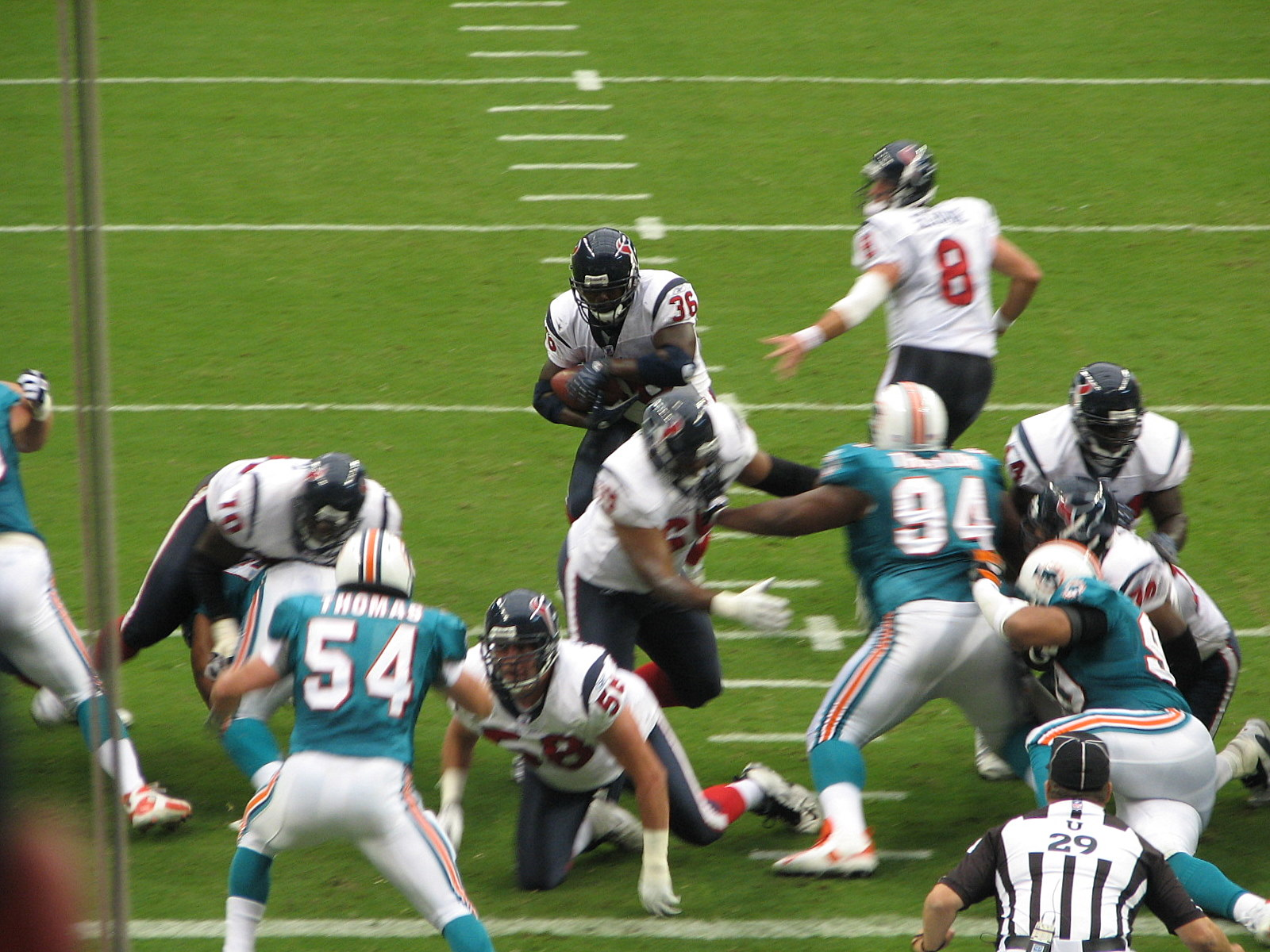
Dayne receives a handoff from Matt Schaub in 2007

Dayne was selected in the first round with the 11th overall pick of the 2000 NFL draft by the New York Giants. In Dayne's first season he teamed up with Tiki Barber in the backfield to create the tandem known as "Thunder and Lightning," a combination of Dayne's power and Barber's speed. The Giants went on to play in Super Bowl XXXV. Over the next few years, Dayne's carries slowly diminished, with head coach Jim Fassel, with whom Dayne already had a contentious relationship, growing increasingly disappointed with Dayne's supposed lack of commitment to lose weight. Fassel reportedly also did not like Dayne's halfback running style, and tried to make him a goal line back. Dayne missed every game during the 2003 regular season due to injury, and the Giants refused to trade him. After Fassel was fired, Dayne shed 40 pounds and received a second chance under new head coach Tom Coughlin. Dayne saw minimal playing time during the 2004 regular season. The Giants did not attempt to re-sign Dayne, and he later signed a one-year deal with the Denver Broncos for the 2005 season. He was re-signed in the 2006 offseason and named the starter, but fell on the depth chart as the pre-season went along and was cut on September 2, 2006. The Houston Texans claimed Dayne off waivers the following day.

As a member of the Houston Texans, Dayne rushed for 429 yards and five touchdowns in December 2006. In 2007, he filled in for the injured Ahman Green. Dayne did not play in the NFL after the 2007 season.

== Career statistics ==
=== NFL ===
| Year | Team | GP | Rushing | | | | | | Receiving | | | | | | | Fumbles | |
| Year | Team | GP | Att | Yds | Avg | Lng | TD | FD | Rec | Tgt | Yds | Avg | Lng | TD | FD | Fum | Lost |
|---|---|---|---|---|---|---|---|---|---|---|---|---|---|---|---|---|---|
| 2000 | NYG | 16 | 228 | 770 | 3.4 | 50 | 5 | 47 | 3 | — | 11 | 3.7 | 12 | 0 | 1 | 1 | 1 |
| 2001 | NYG | 16 | 180 | 690 | 3.8 | 61 | 7 | 38 | 8 | — | 67 | 8.4 | 21 | 0 | 1 | 2 | 1 |
| 2002 | NYG | 16 | 125 | 428 | 3.4 | 30 | 3 | 26 | 11 | — | 49 | 4.5 | 8 | 0 | 1 | 1 | 1 |
| 2003 | NYG | 0 | Didn’t play due to injury | | | | | | | | | | | | | | |
| 2004 | NYG | 14 | 52 | 179 | 3.4 | 15 | 1 | 10 | 1 | — | 7 | 7.0 | 7 | 0 | 0 | 0 | 0 |
| 2005 | DEN | 10 | 53 | 270 | 5.1 | 55 | 1 | 14 | 3 | — | 17 | 5.7 | 7 | 0 | 0 | 1 | 1 |
| 2006 | HOU | 11 | 151 | 612 | 4.1 | 19 | 5 | 39 | 14 | 17 | 77 | 5.5 | 13 | 0 | 3 | 1 | 0 |
| 2007 | HOU | 13 | 194 | 773 | 4.0 | 39 | 6 | 43 | 17 | 24 | 112 | 6.6 | 17 | 0 | 4 | 1 | 0 |
| Career | | 96 | 983 | 3,722 | 3.8 | 61 | 28 | 217 | 57 | 41 | 340 | 6.0 | 21 | 0 | 10 | 7 | 4 |

=== College ===
| Season | Team | GP | Rushing | | | | Receiving | | | |
| Season | Team | GP | Att | Yds | Avg | TD | Rec | Yds | Avg | TD |
|---|---|---|---|---|---|---|---|---|---|---|
| 1996 | Wisconsin | 13 | 325 | 2,109 | 6.5 | 21 | 14 | 133 | 9.5 | 0 |
| 1997 | Wisconsin | 13 | 263 | 1,457 | 5.5 | 15 | 10 | 117 | 11.7 | 0 |
| 1998 | Wisconsin | 12 | 295 | 1,525 | 5.2 | 15 | 6 | 45 | 7.5 | 0 |
| 1999 | Wisconsin | 12 | 337 | 2,034 | 6.0 | 20 | 1 | 9 | 9.0 | 0 |
| Totals | | 50 | 1,220 | 7,125 | 5.8 | 71 | 31 | 304 | 9.8 | 0 |

== Career highlights ==
College

- Heisman Trophy (1999)
- Maxwell Award (1999)
- Walter Camp Award (1999)
- Chic Harley Award (1999)
- Doak Walker Award (1999)
- Jim Brown Award (1999)
- AP College Football Player of the Year (1999)
- SN Player of the Year (1999)
- Unanimous All-American (1999)
- 2× First-team All-American (1997, 1998)
- Third-team All-American (1996)
- Big Ten Male Athlete of the Year (2000)
- Big Ten Most Valuable Player (1999)
- Big Ten Offensive Player of the Year (1999)
- Big Ten Co-Freshman of the Year (1996)
- 3× First-team All-Big Ten (1996, 1998, 1999)
- Second-team All-Big Ten (1997)
- Wisconsin Badgers No. 33 retired

== See also ==
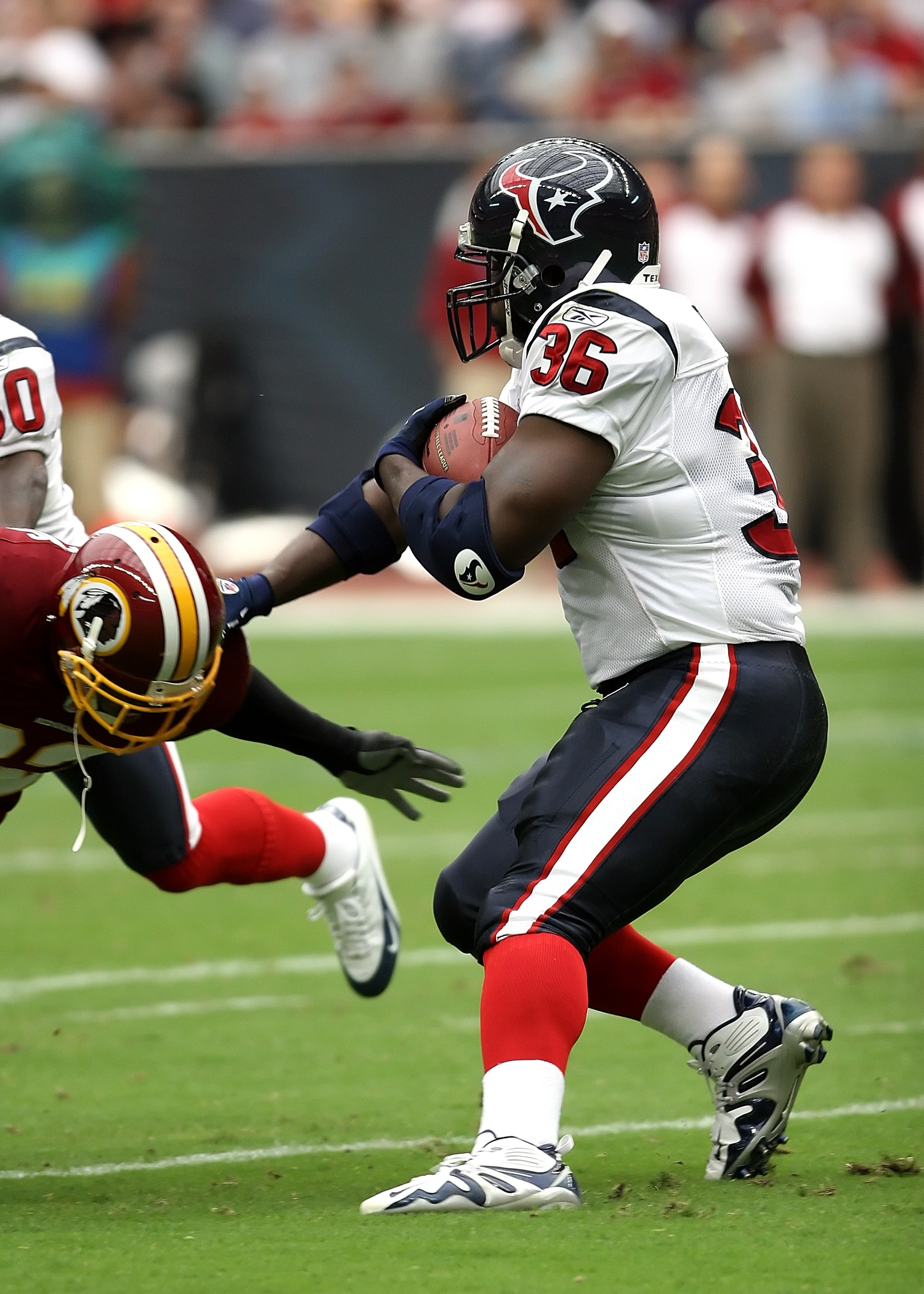
Dayne in 2006 with Houston

- History of the New York Giants (1994–present)
- List of NCAA Division I FBS running backs with at least 50 career rushing touchdowns
- List of college football yearly rushing leaders
