= 1995 All-Big Ten Conference football team =

American college football all-star team

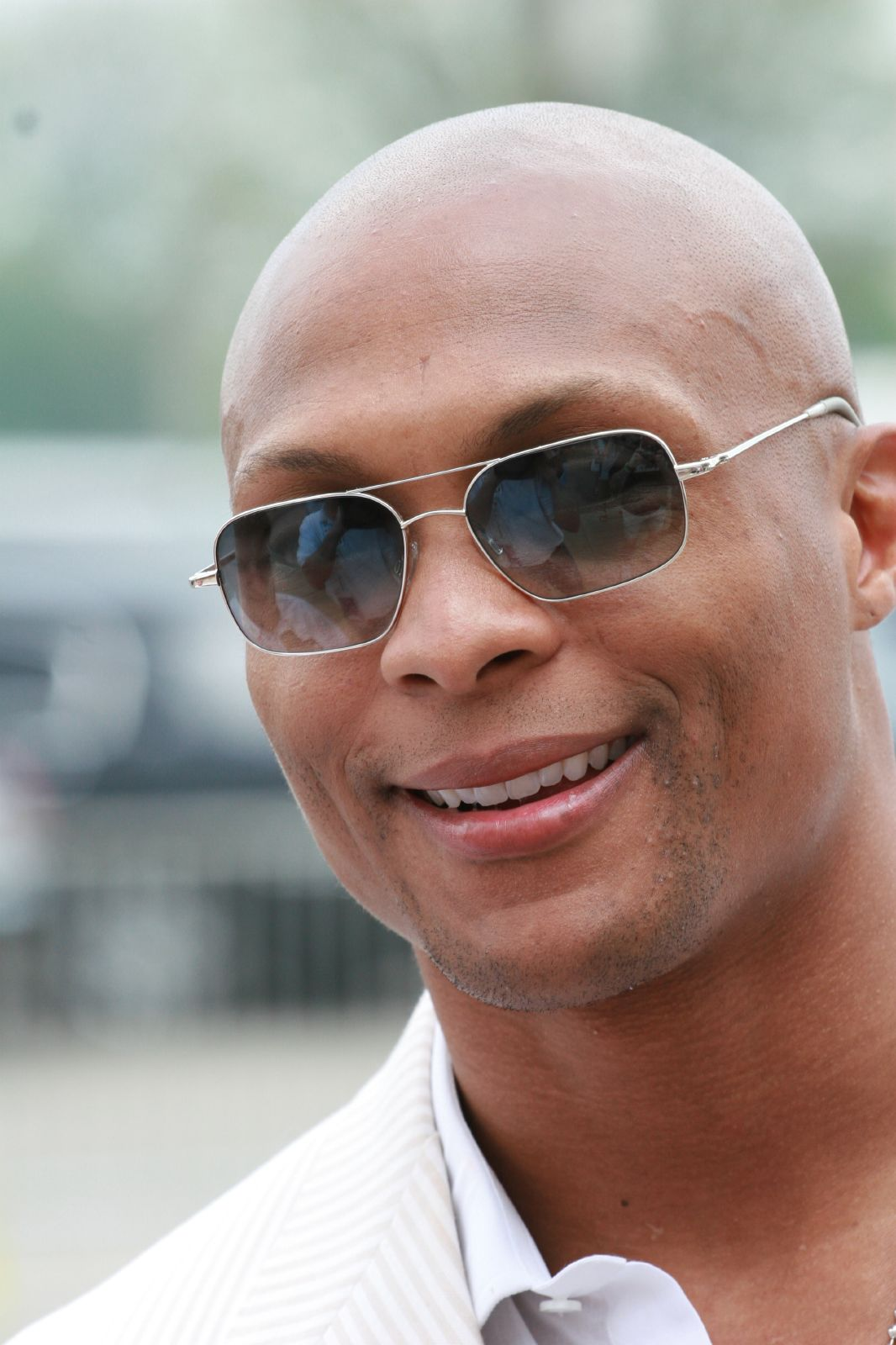
1995 Heisman Trophy winner Eddie George

The 1995 All-Big Ten Conference football team consists of American football players chosen as All-Big Ten Conference players for the 1995 NCAA Division I-A football season. Separate teams were selected by the Big Ten Conference football head coaches ("Coaches") and by a media panel ("Media").

The 1995 Northwestern Wildcats football team won the Big Ten championship. Northwestern linebacker Pat Fitzgerald was selected as the consensus Defensive Player of the Year by both the Coaches and Media. Fitzgerald went on to become Northwestern's head football coach, a position he has held since 2006. In addition to Fitzgerald, the Wildcats had five other players selected as first-team honorees: running back Darnell Autry, defensive back Chris Martin, offensive linemen Rob Johnson and Ryan Padgett, and kicker Sam Valenzisi. Head coach Gary Barnett also won the Big Ten's Dave McClain Coach of the Year award.

Despite finishing second in the conference, the 1995 Ohio State Buckeyes football team under head coach John Cooper led all other teams with seven first-team honorees. The Ohio State contingent was led by running back Eddie George who was the consensus selection as the Big Ten Offensive Player of the Year. George also won the 1995 Heisman Trophy. The other Ohio State players receiving first-team honors were quarterback Bobby Hoying, wide receiver Terry Glenn, offensive tackle Orlando Pace, tight end Rickey Dudley, linebacker Mike Vrabel and defensive back Shawn Springs. George and Pace have both been inducted into the College Football Hall of Fame.

The 1995 Michigan Wolverines football team under head coach Lloyd Carr also landed six players on the All-Big Ten first team. Michigan's honorees were linebacker Jarrett Irons, defensive tackle Jason Horn, defensive backs Charles Woodson and Charles Thompson, and offensive linemen Jon Runyan and Rod Payne. Woodson was named by the Coaches as the Big Ten Freshman of the Year in 1995, and he went on in 1997 to become the first defensive player to win the Heisman Trophy.

Penn State under head coach Joe Paterno also landed three players on the first team. They were wide receiver Bobby Engram, offensive lineman Jeff Hartings and defensive back Brian Miller. Running back Curtis Enis was honored by the Media as the Big Ten Freshman of the Year.

== Offensive selections ==
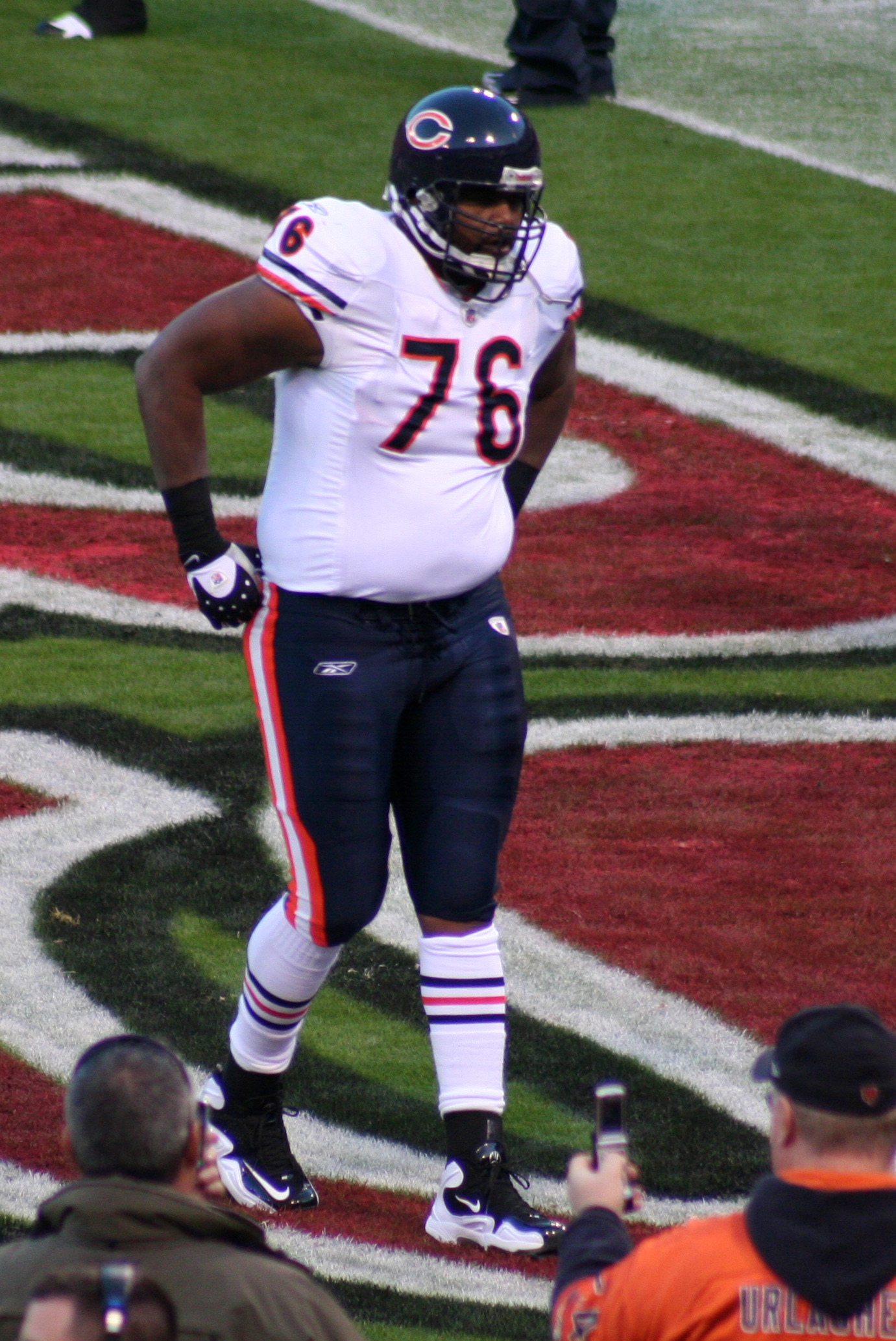
College Football Hall of Fame inductee Orlando Pace

=== Quarterbacks ===
- Bobby Hoying, Ohio State (Coaches-1; Media-1)
- Tony Banks, Michigan State (Coaches-2)
- Darrell Bevell, Wisconsin (Media-2)

=== Running backs ===
- Eddie George, Ohio State (Coaches-1; Media-1)
- Darnell Autry, Northwestern (Coaches-1; Media-1)
- Mike Alstott, Purdue (Coaches-2; Media-2)
- Tim Biakabutuka, Michigan (Coaches-2; Media-2)

=== Centers ===
- Rod Payne, Michigan (Coaches-1)
- Rob Johnson, Northwestern (Coaches-2; Media-1)
- Todd Jesewitz, Minnesota (Media-2)

=== Guards ===
- Ryan Padgett, Northwestern (Coaches-1; Media-1)
- Jeff Hartings, Penn State (Coaches-1; Media-1)
- Joe Marinaro, Michigan (Coaches-2; Media-2)
- LeShun Daniels, Ohio State (Coaches-2)
- Matt Purdy, Iowa (Media-2)

=== Tackles ===
- Orlando Pace, Ohio State (Coaches-1; Media-1)
- Jon Runyan, Michigan (Coaches-1; Media-1)
- Andre Johnson, Penn State (Coaches-2)
- Keith Conlin, Penn State (Coaches-2)
- Brian Kardos, Northwestern (Media-2)
- Bob Denton, Michigan State (Media-2)

=== Tight ends ===
- Rickey Dudley, Ohio State (Coaches-1; Media-1)
- Scott Slutzker, Iowa (Coaches-2; Media-2)

=== Receivers ===
- Bobby Engram, Penn State (Coaches-1; Media-1)
- Terry Glenn, Ohio State (Coaches-1; Media-1)
- Mercury Hayes, Michigan (Coaches-2; Media-2)
- Amani Toomer, Michigan (Coaches-2)
- D'Wayne Bates, Northwestern (Media-2)

== Defensive selections ==
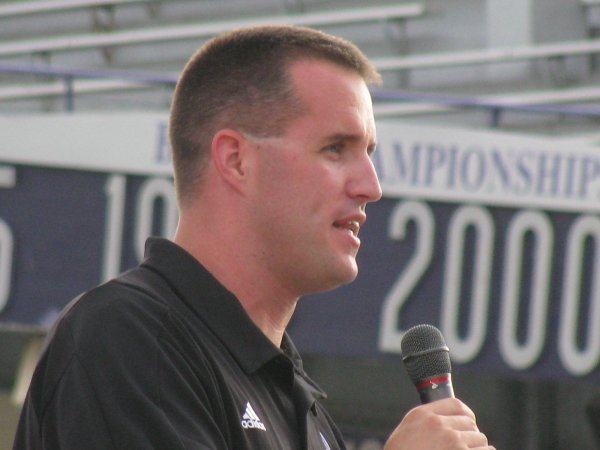
1995 Big Ten Defensive Player of the Year Pat Fitzgerald

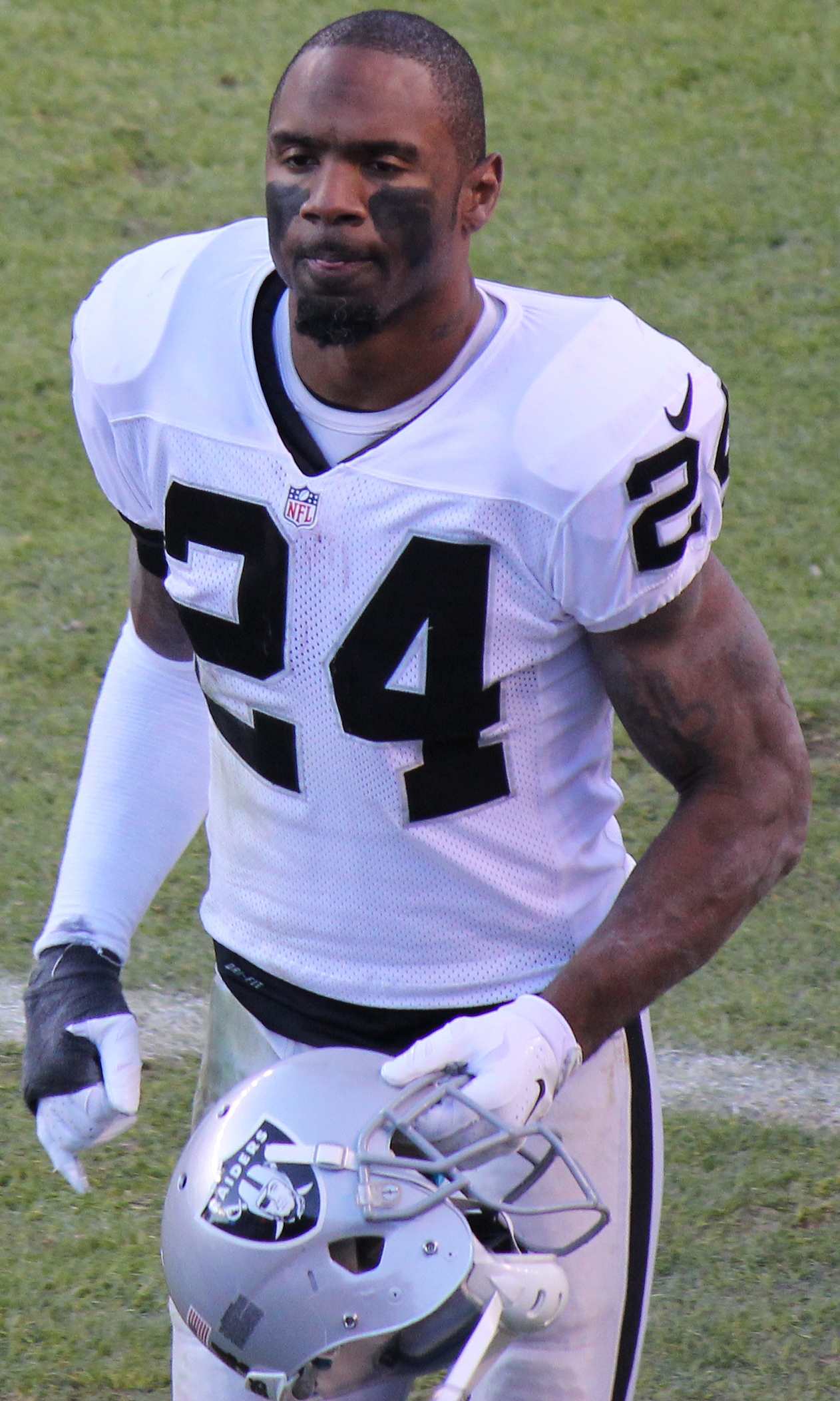
1997 Heisman Trophy winner Charles Woodson

=== Defensive linemen ===
- Jason Horn, Michigan (Coaches-1; Media-1)
- Simeon Rice, Illinois (Coaches-1; Media-1)
- Tarek Saleh, Wisconsin (Coaches-1; Media-1)
- Mike Vrabel, Ohio State (Coaches-1; Media-1)
- William Carr, Michigan (Coaches-2; Media-2)
- Trent Zenkewicz, Michigan (Coaches-2)
- Luke Fickell, Ohio State (Coaches-2)
- Jason Maniecki, Wisconsin (Coaches-2)
- Matt Finkes, Ohio State (Media-2)
- Matt Rice, Northwestern (Media-2)
- Nathan Davis, Indiana (Media-2)

=== Linebackers ===
- Pat Fitzgerald, Northwestern (Coaches-1; Media-1)
- Jarrett Irons, Michigan (Coaches-1; Media-1)
- Kevin Hardy, Illinois (Coaches-1; Media-1)
- Terry Killens, Penn State (Coaches-2; Media-2)
- Greg Bellisari, Ohio State (Coaches-2)
- Pete Monty, Wisconsin (Media-2)
- Bob Diaco, Iowa (Coaches-2; Media-2)

=== Defensive backs ===
- Chris Martin, Northwestern (Coaches-1; Media-1)
- Shawn Springs, Ohio State (Coaches-1; Media-1)
- Clarence Thompson, Michigan (Coaches-1; Media-1)
- Charles Woodson, Michigan (Coaches-1; Media-2)
- Brian Miller, Penn State (Coaches-2; Media-1)
- Antoine Patton, Illinois (Coaches-2; Media-2)
- Hudhaifa Ismaeli, Northwestern (Coaches-2; Media-2)
- Rodney Ray, Northwestern (Coaches-2)
- Eric Collier, Northwestern (Coaches-2)
- Rodney Heath, Minnesota (Media-2)

== Special teams ==
=== Kickers ===
- Sam Valenzisi, Northwestern (Coaches-1; Media-1)
- Brett Conway, Penn State (Coaches-2; Media-2)

=== Punters ===
- Nick Gallery, Iowa (Coaches-1; Media-1)
- Brett Larsen, Illinois (Coaches-2; Media-2)

== Individual awards ==
=== Offensive Player of the Year ===
- Eddie George, Ohio State (Coaches, Media)

=== Defensive Player of the Year ===
- Pat Fitzgerald, Northwestern (Coaches, Media)

=== Coach of the Year ===
- Gary Barnett, Northwestern (Dave McClain Coach of the Year)

=== Freshman of the Year ===
- Curtis Enis, Penn State (Media)
- Charles Woodson, Michigan (Coaches)

== Key ==
Bold = selected as a first-team player by both the coaches and media panel

- Coaches = selected by Big Ten Conference coaches
- Media = selected by Midwest media panel

== See also ==
- 1995 College Football All-America Team
