= Rod Payne =

American football player and coach (born 1974)

No. 64
- Position: Center

Personal information
- Born: June 14, 1974 (age 52); Miami, Florida, U.S.
- Listed height: 6 ft 4 in (1.93 m)
- Listed weight: 305 lb (138 kg)

Career information
- High school: Killian (Miami, Florida)
- College: Michigan (1993–1996)
- NFL draft: 1997: 3rd round, 76th overall pick

Career history

Playing
- Cincinnati Bengals (1997–1998); Baltimore Ravens (2000)*
- * Offseason or practice squad member only

Coaching
- Westminster Academy (FL) (2006–2007); Felix Varela HS (FL) (2008); Florida Atlantic (2009–2011) Defensive line coach; Spanish River HS (FL) (2012)

Awards and highlights
- As player: First-team All-American (1996); 2× First-team All-Big Ten (1995, 1996); As coach: South Florida Sun-Sentinel Coach of the Year (2007)

Career NFL statistics
- Games played: 6
- Stats at Pro Football Reference

Rod Payne (born June 14, 1974) is an American former professional football player who was a center for the Cincinnati Bengals of the National Football League (NFL). He played college football for the Michigan Wolverines from 1993 to 1996, earning first-team All-American honors in 1996. He was selected by the Bengals in the third round of the 1997 NFL draft. He won a Super Bowl with the 2000 Baltimore Ravens. He became a high school football coach and was named the 2007 South Florida Sun-Sentinel Class 3A-2A-1A Coach of the Year. In March 2009, Payne was announced as the defensive line coach for Florida Atlantic University. After leaving Florida Atlantic, Payne was named the head football coach at Spanish River Community High School in Boca Raton, Florida. Payne stepped down from his position at Spanish River after going 0–10 in one season. He is now a personal fitness trainer at The Facility for Personal Training in Boca Raton.

== Early life and college career ==
A native of Miami, Florida, Payne was an All-Dade County offensive lineman and wrestler at Miami Killian High School. Payne started 40 games during his four years at the University of Michigan, including 37 consecutive games. Payne was twice named first team All Big Ten and in 1996 was named the Most Valuable Player on the Michigan team, a team co-captain (with Jarrett Irons), and a first team All-American by the American Football Coaches Association. Payne was an ambidextrous center. Payne once broke his right wrist during the Michigan-Michigan State Paul Bunyan Trophy game and proceeded to snap the ball for the rest of his game with his left hand.

== Professional career ==
Payne was selected in the third round of the 1997 NFL draft by the Cincinnati Bengals. He was a backup with the Bengals from 1997 to 1998 and was released in September 1998. His playing career was shortened by numerous injuries. He sat out the 1999 NFL season and had surgery on both knees. The Bengals had released him during the 1999 season knowing he was injured, which caused Payne to file a grievance, which was settled. He signed with the Baltimore Ravens in April 2000 and was released at the end of training camp. He was signed to the Ravens' 2000 practice squad in November, and he won a Super Bowl ring with them in Super Bowl XXXV. Over the course of his career, Payne had twelve surgeries to repair his numerous football-related injuries.

In 2006, Payne co-authored a 2006 book called "Centered by a Miracle" (Sports Publishing, ISBN 1-59670-145-5) with his friend and sportswriter Steve Rom. The publisher describes the book as follows: "After Steve was diagnosed with leukemia, Rod left his job as co-host of a daily sports radio talk show in Ann Arbor, his first post-football career, to help rally his friend back to health. Steve's future, once again, became clear. So too, however, did the challenges that lay ahead. What ensued was a 10-month battle for survival, one that would ultimately turn these friends into brothers." Since retiring, Rod has taught special education and been a managing partner of a health club. Rod has served on the board of the Michigan Letterwinners M Club Alumni Association.

Since retiring from football, Payne has operated a shop in Ann Arbor, Michigan where he customized cars, hosted a sports talk radio show in Ann Arbor, taught special education, been a personal trainer, and served as managing partner of a gym in the Ann Arbor area. He is also a speaker for the Fellowship of Christian Athletes (FCA). Rod, who was an only child himself, is married and has one child. He was living in Boca Raton, Florida and coaching the football and wrestling teams at Westminster Academy in Fort Lauderdale, Florida. Payne was selected the South Florida Sun-Sentinel Class 3A-2A-1A Coach of the Year in 2007 after he led the Lions to a 7–3 record following his 1–9 first season at Westminster in 2006. In 2008, Rod assumed the head coaching duties at Felix Varela High School in Kendall, Florida after a 2007 season where they posted a 3–7 record. Varela competes in Class 6A, the largest and most competitive class.

On March 13, 2009, Payne was announced as the new defensive line coach at Florida Atlantic University under head coach Howard Schnellenberger. Schnellenberger retired following the 2011 season. Payne was hired to coach Spanish River Community High School in Boca Raton, Florida for the 2012 season.
