= Brian Alford =

American football player (born 1975)

No. 84, 80, 8
- Position: Wide receiver

Personal information
- Born: June 7, 1975 (age 51); Oak Park, Michigan, U.S.
- Listed height: 6 ft 2 in (1.88 m)
- Listed weight: 175 lb (79 kg)

Career information
- High school: Oak Park
- College: Purdue
- NFL draft: 1998: 3rd round, 70th overall pick

Career history
- New York Giants (1998–1999); Miami Dolphins (2000–2001)*; Indiana Firebirds (2003)
- * Offseason or practice squad member only

Awards and highlights
- First-team All-American (1997); 2× First-team All-Big Ten (1996, 1997); Most touchdown receptions in a career at Purdue (31)

Career NFL statistics
- Receptions: 2
- Receiving yards: 18
- Total touchdowns: 1
- Stats at Pro Football Reference

Career AFL statistics
- Receptions: 6
- Receiving yards: 148
- Touchdowns: 3
- Stats at ArenaFan.com

Brian Wayne Alford (born June 7, 1975) is an American former professional football player who was a wide receiver for the New York Giants of the National Football League (NFL). He played college football for the Purdue Boilermakers, earning first-team All-American honors in 1997. He was selected by the Giants in the third round of the 1998 NFL draft.

== Early life ==
A 1993 graduate of Oak Park High School in Oak Park, Michigan, Alford was a standout member of the football and track and field teams. He was a three-year starter for football, and named to the Oakland Press Dream Team, first-team all-state as well as voted to play in the Michigan All-Star game as a senior.

== College career ==
Alford attended Purdue University on a football scholarship. In 1993, Alford redshirted. In 1994, he played in the final five games after recovering from a broken clavicle, sustained in preseason Black & Gold Game. As a sophomore, he started first 6 games and played in all 11 games, leading the team in catches and TDs. As a junior in 1996, he was named First-team All-Big Ten and Purdue's MVP. He placed 22nd in NCAA in pass receptions, and 2nd in the conference and 17th in nation in yardage. On November 23, 1996, Alford had the 2nd greatest about of receiving yards in a single Old Oaken Bucket game, with 162 yards. He also established a career-high 12 touchdown receptions. With Joe Tiller taking over as Purdue's head coach in 1997, he set career highs in catches (67) and yards (1,228). He was named a team captain, First-team All-American by Sporting News News, 2nd team by the AP 3rd team by Sporting News. He graduated as the all-time leader in receiving yards and receiving touchdowns. He also set single season receiving yards, and at the time of his graduation, ranked 4th on all-time Big Ten single season list 4th in TD, 4th in receiving yards, and 8th in receptions. He also holds the Purdue record for receiving touchdowns in a career, 31, as well as placing in the top 5 in several other Purdue receiving records.

=== Statistics ===
		Receiving				
Season	Team	Rec	Yds	Avg	TD	Long
1994	Purdue	4	58	14.5	1	28
1995	Purdue	34	686	20.2	8	78
1996	Purdue	63	1,057	16.8	12	90
1997	Purdue	63	1,228	19.5	10	93
	Totals	164	3,029	18.5	**31**	93

- Numbers in **Bold** are Purdue school records

== Professional career ==
=== New York Giants ===
Alford was drafted in the third round, 70th overall, by the New York Giants, in the 1998 NFL draft. He was released August 27, 2000 after appearing in just 6 games over the course of 2 seasons, making just 2 catches.

=== Miami Dolphins ===
Alford would sign with the Miami Dolphins later in 2000, and was placed on the practice squad. He was released on December 7, 2000, only to be re-signed on December 13, and then was then released again on July 12, 2001.

=== Indiana Firebirds ===
For the 2003 season, Alford started as a practice squad member of the Indiana Firebirds of the Arena Football League. He was later signed off the practice squad, catching 6 passes for 148 yards and 3 touchdowns.
