= Donald Hayes =

American football player (born 1975)

No. 88, 81
- Position: Wide receiver

Personal information
- Born: July 13, 1975 (age 51); Century, Florida, U.S.
- Listed height: 6 ft 4 in (1.93 m)
- Listed weight: 220 lb (100 kg)

Career information
- High school: Madison East (Madison, Wisconsin)
- College: Wisconsin
- NFL draft: 1998: 4th round, 106th overall pick

Career history
- Carolina Panthers (1998–2001); New England Patriots (2002); Jacksonville Jaguars (2003)*; Carolina Panthers (2004)*
- * Offseason or practice squad member only

Career NFL statistics
- Receptions: 144
- Receiving yards: 1,988
- Total touchdowns: 9
- Stats at Pro Football Reference

Donald Ross Hayes Jr. (born July 13, 1975) is an American former professional football player who was a wide receiver for the Carolina Panthers and New England Patriots of the National Football League (NFL). Hayes played college football for the Wisconsin Badgers. He was selected by the Panthers 106th overall in the fourth round of the 1998 NFL draft.

In 2003, Hayes signed with the Jacksonville Jaguars but was released following the preseason.

On May 31, 2006, Hayes signed with the Toronto Argonauts of the Canadian Football League (CFL) and participated in their pre-season training camp. He was cut by the team on June 10, 2006.
