= Jerry Wunsch =

American football player (born 1974)

No. 71, 70
- Position: Offensive tackle

Personal information
- Born: January 21, 1974 (age 52); Eau Claire, Wisconsin, U.S.
- Listed height: 6 ft 6 in (1.98 m)
- Listed weight: 339 lb (154 kg)

Career information
- High school: Wausau West (Wausau, Wisconsin)
- College: Wisconsin
- NFL draft: 1997: 2nd round, 37th overall pick

Career history
- Tampa Bay Buccaneers (1997–2001); Seattle Seahawks (2002–2005)

Awards and highlights
- Third-team All-American (1996); Second-team All-Big Ten (1996)

Career NFL statistics
- Games played: 113
- Games started: 51
- Fumble recoveries: 2
- Stats at Pro Football Reference

Gerald Wunsch (born January 21, 1974) is an American former professional football player who was an offensive tackle for eight seasons in the National Football League (NFL) during the 1990s and early 2000s. He played college football for the Wisconsin Badgers and played professionally for the Tampa Bay Buccaneers and Seattle Seahawks of the NFL.

== Early life ==
Wunsch was born in Eau Claire, Wisconsin and played high school football at Wausau West High School. He played college football at the University of Wisconsin–Madison. In his senior year, he was awarded first-team All-Big Ten honors after starting every game as right tackle.

== Professional career ==
Wunsch was selected by the Tampa Bay Buccaneers in the second round of the 1997 NFL draft. He played for Tampa Bay for five seasons before being cut in 2002. Wunsch then played for the Seattle Seahawks for three seasons.

== Life after the NFL ==
Wunsch actively volunteered in Wisconsin while he played professionally, and after retirement he moved to the Tampa Bay area to work with the Wunsch Family Foundation full-time. The Foundation works with children who have cancer and chronic blood disorders. Wunsch and his family live in Clearwater, Florida.
