= 1996 All-Big Ten Conference football team =

American college football all-star team

The 1996 All-Big Ten Conference football team consists of American football players chosen as All-Big Ten Conference players for the 1996 NCAA Division I-A football season. The conference recognizes two official All-Big Ten selectors: (1) the Big Ten conference coaches, who selected separate offensive and defensive units and named first- and second-team players (the "Coaches" team); and (2) a panel of sports writers and broadcasters covering the Big Ten, who also selected offensive and defensive units and named first- and second-team players (the "Media" team).

== Offensive selections ==
=== Quarterbacks ===
- Steve Schnur, Northwestern (Coaches-1; Media-1)
- Matt Sherman, Iowa (Coaches-2)
- Todd Schultz, Michigan St. (Media-2)

=== Running backs ===
- Darnell Autry, Northwestern (Coaches-1; Media-1)
- Ron Dayne, Wisconsin (Coaches-2; Media-1)
- Sedrick Shaw, Iowa (Coaches-1 tie)
- Curtis Enis, Penn State (Coaches-1 [tie])
- Robert Holcombe, Illinois (Coaches-2 [tie]; Media-2)
- Pepe Pearson, Ohio State (Coaches-2 [tie]; Media-2)

=== Centers ===
- Rod Payne, Michigan (Coaches-1; Media-1)
- Juan Porter, Ohio State (Coaches-2; Media-2)

=== Guards ===
- Justin Chabot, Northwestern (Coaches-1; Media-1)
- Damon Denson, Michigan (Coaches-1; Media-2)
- Jamie Vanderveldt, Wisconsin (Media-1)
- Emmett Zitelli, Purdue (Coaches-2; Media-2)
- Zack Adami, Michigan (Coaches-2)

=== Tackles ===
- Orlando Pace, Ohio St. (Coaches-1; Media-1)
- Ross Verba, Iowa (Coaches-1; Media-1)
- Jerry Wunsch, Wisconsin (Coaches-2; Media-2)
- Flozell Adams, Michigan St. (Coaches-2; Media-2)

=== Tight ends ===
- Jerame Tuman, Michigan (Coaches-1; Media-1)
- Keith Olsommer, Penn State (Coaches-2; Media-2)

=== Receivers ===
- D'Wayne Bates, Northwestern (Coaches-1; Media-1)
- Brian Alford, Purdue (Coaches-1; Media-1)
- Tim Dwight, Iowa (Coaches-2; Media-2)
- Derrick Mason, Michigan St. (Coaches-2)
- Ryan Thelwell, Minnesota (Media-2)

== Defensive selections ==
=== Defensive linemen ===
- William Carr, Michigan (Coaches-1; Media-1)
- Matt Finkes, Ohio State (Coaches-1; Media-1 [tie])
- Mike Vrabel, Ohio State (Coaches-1; Media-1)
- Tarek Saleh, Wisconsin (Coaches-1; Media-1)
- Jared DeVries, Iowa (Coaches-2; Media-1 [tie])
- Luke Fickell, Ohio State (Coaches-2; Media-2)
- Brandon Noble, Penn State (Coaches-2; Media-2)
- David Bowens, Michigan (Coaches-2; Media-2)
- Matt Rice, Northwestern (Coaches-2)
- Nate Davis, Indiana (Media-2)

=== Linebackers ===
- Pat Fitzgerald, Northwestern (Coaches-1; Media-1)
- Jarrett Irons, Michigan (Coaches-1; Media-1)
- Andy Katzenmoyer, OSU (Coaches-1 [tie]; Media-1)
- Pete Monty, Wisconsin (Coaches-1 [tie]; Media-2)
- Greg Bellisari, Ohio State (Coaches-2; Media-2)
- Chike Okeafor, Purdue (Coaches-2)
- Aaron Collins, Penn State (Coaches-2)
- Broderick Hall, Minnesota (Media-2)

=== Defensive backs ===
- Kim Herring, Penn State (Coaches-1; Media-1)
- Shawn Springs, Ohio State (Coaches-1; Media-1)
- Charles Woodson, Michigan (Coaches-1; Media-1)
- Damien Robinson, Iowa (Coaches-2; Media-1)
- Brian Miller, Penn State (Coaches-1)
- Eric Collier, Northwestern (Coaches-2; Media-2)
- Tom Knight, Iowa (Coaches-2; Media-2)
- Eric Allen, Indiana (tie) (Coaches-2; Media-2)
- Marcus Ray, Michigan (tie) (Coaches-2)
- Damon Moore, Ohio State (Media-2)

== Special teams ==
=== Kickers ===
- Brett Conway, Penn State (Coaches-1; Media-1)
- John Hall, Wisconsin (Coaches-2; Media-2)

=== Punters ===
- Nick Gallery, Iowa (Coaches-1; Media-1)
- Paul Burton, Northwestern (Coaches-2)
- Alan Sutkowski, Indiana (Media-2)

== Key ==
Bold = selected as a first-team player by both the coaches and media panel

Coaches = selected by Big Ten Conference coaches

Media = selected by a media panel

== See also ==
- 1996 College Football All-America Team
