= Daryl Carter =

American football player (born 1975)

No. 59,50
- Position: Linebacker

Personal information
- Born: February 24, 1975 (age 51); Milwaukee, Wisconsin
- Listed height: 6 ft 2 in (1.88 m)
- Listed weight: 222 lb (101 kg)

Career information
- High school: Milwaukee (WI) Washington
- College: Wisconsin
- NFL draft: 1997: undrafted

Career history
- Chicago Bears (1997); Greenbay Packers (1999)*
- * Offseason or practice squad member only

Career NFL statistics
- Games played: 1
- Stats at Pro Football Reference

Daryl Carter is a former linebacker in the National Football League. He was a member of the Chicago Bears during the 1997 NFL season.
