= Pete Monty =

American football player (born 1974)

- Monty in 2009

No. 51, 94
- Position: Linebacker

Personal information
- Born: July 3, 1974 (age 52); Fort Collins, Colorado, U.S.
- Listed height: 6 ft 2 in (1.88 m)
- Listed weight: 250 lb (113 kg)

Career information
- High school: Fort Collins
- College: Wisconsin
- NFL draft: 1997: 4th round, 103rd overall pick

Career history
- New York Giants (1997–2000); Minnesota Vikings (2001)

Awards and highlights
- First-team All-Big Ten (1996); Second-team All-Big Ten (1995)

Career NFL statistics
- Tackles: 62
- Sacks: 2
- Forced fumbles: 1
- Stats at Pro Football Reference

Peter Charles Monty (born July 3, 1974) is an American former professional football player who was a linebacker in the National Football League (NFL) for the New York Giants and the Minnesota Vikings. He played college football for the Wisconsin Badgers football, who won the 1994 Rose Bowl. He was then selected in the fourth round of the 1997 NFL draft.
