= 2005 Tampa Bay Storm season =

Arena Football League team season

- Head coach: Tim Marcum
- Home stadium: St. Pete Times Forum

Results
- Record: 10–6
- Division place: 3rd NC Southern
- Playoffs: Lost Conference Semifinals (Force) 46–62

The 2005 Tampa Bay Storm season was the 19th season for the franchise in the Arena Football League, and the 15th in the Tampa Bay area. The team was coached by Tim Marcum and played their home games at the St. Pete Times Forum.

== Standings ==
South Division
Team	W	L	PCT	PF	PA	DIV	Home	Away
Georgia Force	11	5	.687	818	715	6–2	8–0	3–5
Orlando Predators	10	6	.625	800	755	5–3	7–1	3–5
Tampa Bay Storm	10	6	.625	836	779	5–3	8–0	2–6
New Orleans VooDoo	9	7	.562	835	787	2–6	5–3	4–4
Austin Wranglers	6	10	.375	774	893	2–6	3–5	3–5

== Regular season schedule ==
Week	Day	Date	Opponent	Results		Location	Report
Week	Day	Date	Opponent	Score	Record	Location	Report
1	Sunday	January 30	San Jose SaberCats	W 63–33	1–0	St. Pete Times Forum	
2	Sunday	February 6	Austin Wranglers	W 62–45	2–0	St. Pete Times Forum	
3	Friday	February 11	at Orlando Predators	L 46–61	2–1	TD Waterhouse Centre	
4	Bye						
5	Friday	February 25	at New Orleans VooDoo	L 42–48 (OT)	2–2	New Orleans Arena	
6	Sunday	March 6	Grand Rapids Rampage	W 70–50	3–2	St. Pete Times Forum	
7	Sunday	March 15	Arizona Rattlers	W 59–56	4–2	St. Pete Times Forum	
8	Sunday	March 20	at Philadelphia Soul	L 69–63	4–3	Wachovia Center	
9	Saturday	March 26	at Los Angeles Avengers	L 59–28	4–4	Staples Center	
10	Saturday	April 2	Georgia Force	W 48–38	5–4	St. Pete Times Forum	
11	Saturday	April 9	Orlando Predators	W 54–32	6–4	St. Pete Times Forum	
12	Sunday	April 17	at Austin Wranglers	W 54–42	7–4	Frank Erwin Center	
13	Sunday	April 24	at Nashville Kats	L 21–37	7–5	Gaylord Entertainment Center	
14	Saturday	April 30	New Orleans VooDoo	W 47–36	8–5	St. Pete Times Forum	
15	Sunday	May 8	at Georgia Force	L 40–52	8–6	Philips Arena	
16	Sunday	May 15	New York Dragons	W 61–58	9–6	St. Pete Times Forum	
17	Sunday	May 22	at Columbus Destroyers	W 78–53	10–6	Nationwide Arena	

== Playoff schedule ==
Round	Day	Date	Opponent	Results	Location	Report
NC Semifinals	Sunday	May 29	at Georgia Force	L 46–62	Philips Arena	
