= Tarek Saleh =

American football player (born 1974)

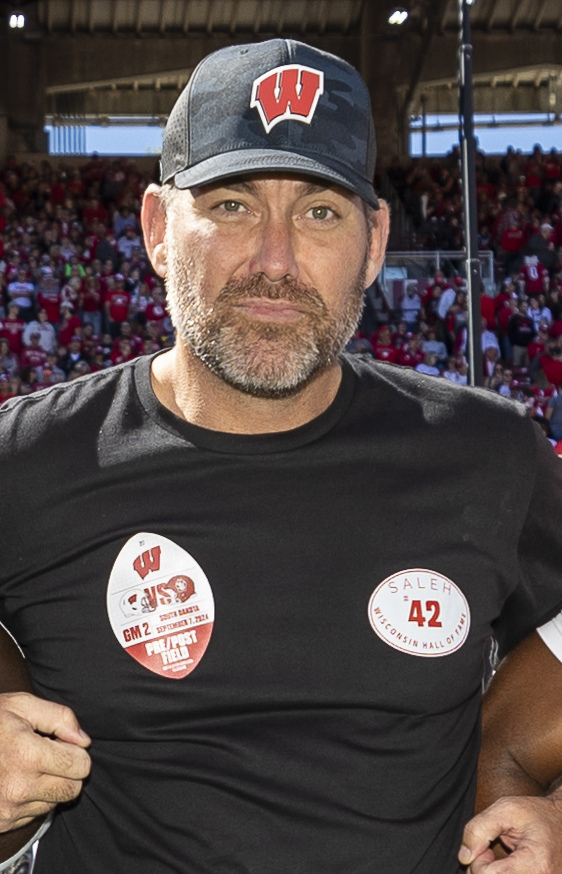
- Saleh in 2024

No. 94, 92, 40, 54
- Position: Linebacker

Personal information
- Born: November 7, 1974 (age 51); Woodbridge, Connecticut, U.S.
- Listed height: 6 ft 1 in (1.85 m)
- Listed weight: 240 lb (109 kg)

Career information
- High school: Notre Dame (West Haven, Connecticut)
- College: Wisconsin
- NFL draft: 1997: 4th round, 122nd overall pick
- Expansion draft: 1999: 1st round, 6th overall pick

Career history
- Carolina Panthers (1997–1998); Cleveland Browns (1999–2001)

Awards and highlights
- First-team All-American (1996); Second-team All-American (1995); 2× First-team All-Big Ten (1995, 1996)

Career NFL statistics
- Total tackles: 42
- Sacks: 1
- Fumble recoveries: 2
- Stats at Pro Football Reference

Tarek Muhammad Saleh (born November 7, 1974) is an American former professional football player who was a linebacker in the National Football League (NFL). He played college football for the Wisconsin Badgers and was selected in the fourth round of the 1997 NFL draft with the 122nd overall pick. He played for the Carolina Panthers from 1997 to 1998 and the Cleveland Browns from 1999 to 2001. His father is Palestinian who immigrated to the United States from the West Bank. He is one of the few Palestinian Americans to have played in the NFL.
